= Swimming at the 2003 World Aquatics Championships – Women's 4 × 200 metre freestyle relay =

Women's 4x200m Free Relay at the 2003 FINA World Aquatics Championships
- Dates: 24 July 2003 (prelims & finals)

Medalists
gold medal	USA
silver medal	Australia
bronze medal	China

The Women's 4 × 200 m Freestyle Relay event at the 10th FINA World Aquatics Championships swam 24 July 2003 in Barcelona, Spain. Preliminary heats swam in the morning session, with the top-8 finishers advancing to swim again in the Final that evening.

At the start of the event, the World (WR) and Championship (CR) records were:

- WR: 7:55.47 swum by East Germany on August 18, 1987 in Strasbourg, France.
- CR: 7:57.96 swum by China on September 5, 1994 in Rome, Italy

== Results ==
=== Final ===
Rank	Nation	Swimmers	Time	Notes
1	USA	Lindsay Benko, Rachel Komisarz, Rhi Jeffrey, Diana Munz	7:55.70	CR
2	Australia	Elka Graham, Linda Mackenzie, Kirsten Thomson, Alice Mills	7:58.42	
3	China	Zhou Yafei, Xu Yanwei, Pang Jiaying, Yang Yu	7:58.53	
4	Great Britain	Karen Legg, Melanie Marshall, Janine Belton, Karen Pickering	8:00.01	
5	Spain	Tatiana Rouba, Melissa Caballero, Laura Roca, Erika Villaécija	8:03.84	
6	Sweden	Johanna Sjöberg, Josefin Lillhage, Ida Mattsson, Malin Svahnström	8:05.05	
7	Netherlands	Marleen Veldhuis, Manon van Rooijen, Haike van Stralen, Celina Lemmen	8:05.82	
8	Canada	Brittany Reimer, Marianne Limpert, Jennifer Fratesi, Laura Nicholls	8:08.42	

=== Preliminaries ===
Rank	Heat/Lane	Nation	Swimmers	Time	Notes
1	H3 L4	United States	Rhi Jeffrey, Rachel Komisarz; Gabrielle Rose, Margaret Hoelzer	8:02.64	q
2	H2 L4	China	Yafei Zhou, Jiaying Pang; Xu Yanwei, Yu Yang	8:04.97	q
3	H3 L3	Spain	Tatiana Rouba, Melissa Caballero; Laura Roca, Erika Villaécija	8:05.52	q
4	H3 L5	Great Britain	Janine Belton, Georgina Lee; Karen Nisbet, Karen Legg	8:05.65	q
5	H2 L3	Sweden	Ida Mattsson, Josefin Lillhage; Johanna Sjöberg, Lotta Wänberg	8:06.87	q
6	H3 L6	Netherlands	Manon van Rooijen, Marleen Veldhuis; Celina Lemmen, Haike van Stralen	8:07.30	q
7	H2 L5	Australia	Giaan Rooney, Heidi Crawford; Linda Mackenzie, Melanie Houghton	8:07.97	q
8	H1 L5	Canada	Brittany Reimer, Jen Button; Marianne Limpert, Laura Nicholls	8:08.85	q
9	H1 L4	Germany	Alessa Ries, Silke Nowotzin; Daniela Götz, Nicole Hetzer	8:09.05	
10	H1 L6	Russia	Polina Shornikova, Daria Parshina; Yana Tolkatcheva, Regina Sytch	8:09.98	
11	H1 L3	Switzerland	Hanna Miluska, Nicole Zahnd; Sandrine Paquier, Chantal Strasser	8:11.91	
12	H3 L2	Brazil	Monique Ferreira, Mariana Brochado; Ana Muniz, Paula Ribeiro	8:13.13	
13	H1 L2	Italy	Sara Parise, Cecilia Vianini; Luisa Striani, Veronica Massari	8:13.18	
14	H2 L2	Greece	Zoi Dimoschaki, Marianna Lymperta; Eleni Kosti, Zampia Melachroinou	8:15.26	
15	H1 L7	Croatia	Sanja Jovanović, Petra Banović; Smiljana Marinović, Anita Galić	8:20.72	
16	H3 L7	Hong Kong	Hang Yu Sze, Flora Kong; Jennifer Ng, Sherry Tsai	8:33.86	
17	H2 L7	India	Shikha Tandon, Ambica Iyengar; Sivranjani Vaidyanathan, Richa Mishra	9:02.37	
-	H2 L6	New Zealand	Alison Fitch, Helen Norfolk; Hannah McLean, Elizabeth Van Welie	DQ	
