= Swimming at the 2003 World Aquatics Championships – Women's 4 × 100 metre freestyle relay =

Women's 4x100m Free Relay at the 2003 FINA World Aquatics Championships
- Dates: 20 July 2003 (prelims & finals)

Medalists
gold medal	USA
silver medal	Germany
bronze medal	Australia

The women's 4x100m freestyle relay event at the 10th FINA World Aquatics Championships swam 20 July 2003 in Barcelona, Spain. Preliminary heats swam in the morning session, with the top-8 finishers advancing to swim again in the Final that evening.

At the start of the event, the World (WR) and Championship (CR) records were:

- WR: 3:36.00 swum by Germany on July 29, 2002 in Berlin, Germany.
- CR: 3:37.91 swum by China on September 7, 1994 in Rome, Italy

== Results ==
=== Final ===
Rank	Nation	Swimmers	Time	Notes
1	USA	Natalie Coughlin, Lindsay Benko, Rhi Jeffrey, Jenny Thompson	3:38.09	
2	Germany	Petra Dallmann, Katrin Meissner, Antje Buschschulte, Sandra Völker	3:38.73	
3	Australia	Libby Lenton, Elka Graham, Jodie Henry, Alice Mills	3:38.83	
4	Netherlands	Manon van Rooijen, Marleen Veldhuis, Annabel Kosten, Chantal Groot	3:41.04	
5	Great Britain	Alison Sheppard, Karen Legg, Melanie Marshall, Karen Pickering	3:41.17	
6	Sweden	Josefin Lillhage, Johanna Sjöberg, Anna-Karin Kammerling, Therese Alshammar	3:41.36	
7	China	Jiaru Cheng, Yu Yang, Xu Yanwei, Jiaying Pang	3:41.46	
8	Italy	Cecilia Vianini, Cristina Chiuso, Sara Parise, Luisa Striani	3:48.18	

=== Preliminaries ===
Rank	Heat/Lane	Nation	Swimmers	Time	Notes
1	H1 L4	Australia	Libby Lenton, Sophie Edington; Elka Graham, Jodie Henry	3:41.16	q
2	H1 L5	Great Britain	Melanie Marshall, Kathryn Evans; Rosalind Brett, Karen Legg	3:41.68	q
3	H3 L3	Netherlands	Manon van Rooijen, Marleen Veldhuis; Annabel Kosten, Chantal Groot	3:41.74	q
4	H3 L4	Germany	Katrin Meissner, Daniela Götz; Alessa Ries, Petra Dallmann	3:42.77	q
5	H3 L5	Sweden	Josefin Lillhage, Ida Mattsson; Therese Alshammar, Johanna Sjöberg	3:42.89	q
6	H2 L4	United States	Gabrielle Rose, Lindsay Benko; Rhi Jeffrey, Maritza Correia	3:43.14	q
7	H2 L5	China	Yu Yang, Jiaru Cheng; Jiaying Pang, Xu Yanwei	3:43.36	q
8	H2 L6	Italy	Cecilia Vianini, Cristina Chiuso; Luisa Striani, Federica Pellegrini	3:44.53	q
9	H1 L3	South Korea	Yoon Ji Ryu, Hyun Ju Kim; Min Ji Shim, So Eun Sun	3:45.46	
10	H3 L6	Greece	Nery-Mantey Niangkouara, Eleni Kosti; Zampia Melachroinou, Zoi Dimoschaki	3:46.35	
11	H1 L6	Switzerland	Dominique Diezi, Nicole Zahnd; Marjorie Sagne, Hanna Miluska	3:47.44	
12	H2 L3	Belarus	Hanna Scherba, Marya Scherba; Sviatlana Khakhlova, Alena Popchanka	3:47.85	
13	H3 L2	Belgium	Tine Bossuyt, Nina van Koeckhoven; Bieke Vandenabeele, Fabienne Dufour	3:48.49	
14	H2 L2	Brazil	Flávia Delaroli, Rebeca Gusmão; Monique Ferreira, Tatiana Lima	3:49.02	
15	H2 L7	Estonia	Elina Partõka, Nele Trepp; Jana Kolukanova, Triin Aljand	3:51.43	
16	H1 L2	Hong Kong	Jennifer Ng, Hang Yu Sze; Flora Kong, Sherry Tsai	3:54.96	
17	H1 L7	India	Shikha Tandon, Ambica Iyengar; Sivranjani Vaidyanathan, Richa Mishra	4:13.00	
-	-	Venezuela		DNS	
