= Swimming at the 2001 World Aquatics Championships – Women's 4 × 200 metre freestyle relay =

Women's 4x200m Free Relay at the 2001 FINA World Aquatics Championships
- Dates: 24 July 2001 (prelims & finals)

Medalists
gold medal	Great Britain
silver medal	Germany
bronze medal	Japan

The Women's 4x200m Freestyle Relay event at the 11th FINA World Aquatics Championships swam 24 July 2001 in Fukuoka, Japan. Preliminary heats swam in the morning session, with the top-8 finishers advancing to swim again in the Final that evening.

In the final, the Australian team originally finished first, with the United States second, and Great Britain taking the bronze. However, soon after finishing, the American team was disqualified for an early changeover, and following that, the Australians were also disqualified for entering the pool before all other teams had finished. Both appealed their disqualifications, with America initially being reinstated due to video evidence. However, the original decisions were eventually upheld meaning that Great Britain took the gold medal, Germany the silver, and Japan the bronze.

At the start of the event, the World (WR) and Championship (CR) records were:

- WR: 7:55.47 swum by East Germany on August 18, 1987, in Strasbourg, France.
- CR: 7:57.96 swum by China on September 5, 1994, in Rome, Italy

== Results ==
=== Final ===
Rank	Nation	Swimmers	Time	Notes
1	Great Britain	Nicola Jackson (2:00.05), Janine Belton (2:00.64), Karen Legg (1:58.95), Karen Pickering (1:59.05)	7:58.69	
2	Germany	Silvia Szalai (2:00.39), Sara Harstick (1:59.48), Hannah Stockbauer (1:59.06), Meike Freitag (2:02.42)	8:01.35	
3	Japan	Maki Mita (2:00.38), Tomoko Hagiwara (1:59.25), Tomoko Nagai (2:00.98), Eri Yamanoi (2:02.36)	8:02.97	
4	Canada	Marianne Limpert (2:01.13), Jessica Deglau (2:00.65), Sophie Simard (2:02.47), Laura Nicholls (2:02.17)	8:06.42	
5	Spain	Laura Roca (2:01.77), Tatiana Rouba (2:01.75), Lidia Elizalde (2:01.91), Paula Carballido (2:01.12)	8:06.55	
6	Italy	Cecilia Vianini (2:01.59), Cristina Chiuso (2:02.27), Sara Parise (2:01.76), Luisa Striani (2:02.94)	8:08.56	
7	Australia	Elka Graham (1:58.54), Linda MacKenzie (2:00.15), Petria Thomas (1:59.15), Giaan Rooney (1:58.16)	DQ	~~7:56.00~~
8	USA	Natalie Coughlin (1:59.94), Cristina Teuscher (1:58.54), Julie Hardt ~~1:59.70~~, Diana Munz (1:58.35)	DQ	~~7:56.53~~

=== Preliminaries ===
Rank	Nation	Swimmers	Time	Notes
1	Great Britain	Nicola Jackson (2:00.58), Janine Belton (2:00.99), Karen Legg (1:59.15), Karen Pickering (2:02.24)	8:02.96	q
2	Australia	Petria Thomas (2:00.67), Kasey Giteau (2:02.90); Linda MacKenzie (1:59.79), Lori Munz (2:00.52)	8:03.88	q
3	Germany	Silvia Szalai (1:59.74), Alessa Ries (2:03.41), Sara Harstick (1:59.60), Meike Freitag (2:02.08)	8:04.83	q
4	United States	Shelly Ripple (2:01.47), Coleen Lanne (2:03.24); Julie Hardt (1:59.25), Maritza Correia (2:01.06)	8:05.02	q
5	Japan	Tomoko Nagai (2:01.90), Maki Mita (2:00.00); Tomoko Hagiwara (2:01.18), Eri Yamanoi (2:02.68)	8:05.76	q
6	Italy	Sara Parise (2:02.65), Cristina Chiuso (2:01.95), Luisa Striani (2:01.29), Cecilia Vianini (2:00.34)	8:06.23	q
7	Canada	Marianne Limpert (2:01.28), Jessica Deglau (2:00.51), Sophie Simard (2:02.34), Laura Nicholls (2:02.35)	8:06.48	q
8	Spain	Laura Roca (2:00.77), Tatiana Rouba (2:03.10), Lidia Elizalde (2:02.14), Paula Carballido (2:01.98)	8:07.99	q
9	China	Zhu Yingwen (2:01.96), Chen Hua (2:03.24); Xu Yanwei (2:02.22), Yang Yu (2:00.95)	8:08.37	
10	Russia	Olga Bogoslovenko (2:05.14), Irina Oufimtseva (2:00.62); Alexandra Malanina (2:03.70), Nadezhda Chemezova (2:03.22)	8:12.68	
11	Romania	Camelia Potec (2:00.36), Simona Păduraru (2:02.06); Florina Herea (2:05.25), Valentina Brat (2:12.89)	8:20.56	
12	Chinese Taipei	Lin Chi-Chan (2:06.53), Kuan Chia-Hsien (2:09.82); Yang Chin-Kuei (2:14.56), Sung Yi-Chien (2:12.03)	8:42.94	
13	Singapore	Christel Bouvron (2:08.03), Nicolette Teo (2:13.45); Rebecca Heng (2:16.00), U-nice Chan (2:10.50)	8:47.98	
