= Swimming at the 2004 Summer Olympics – Women's 4 × 100 metre freestyle relay =

Women's 4 × 100 metre freestyle relay at the Games of the XXVIII Olympiad
- Venue: Olympic Aquatic Centre
- Dates: 14 August 2004 (heats & final)
- Competitors: 72 from 16 nations
- Teams: 16
- Winning time: 3:35.94 WR

Medalists
1st place, gold medalist(s)		Alice Mills, Lisbeth Lenton, Petria Thomas, Jodie Henry, Sarah Ryan*	Australia
2nd place, silver medalist(s)		Kara Lynn Joyce, Natalie Coughlin, Amanda Weir, Jenny Thompson, Lindsay Benko*, Maritza Correia*, Colleen Lanne*	United States
3rd place, bronze medalist(s)		Chantal Groot, Inge Dekker, Marleen Veldhuis, Inge de Bruijn, Annabel Kosten*; *Indicates the swimmer only competed in the preliminary heats.	Netherlands

The women's 4 × 100 metre freestyle relay took place on 14 August at the Olympic Aquatic Centre of the Athens Olympic Sports Complex in Athens, Greece.

For the first time in 48 years, Australia (Alice Mills, Lisbeth Lenton, Petria Thomas, and Jodie Henry) won the gold medal in the event, overhauling Team USA on the final leg. When Henry touched the wall at 3:35.94, the Australians broke a new world record under a 0.06-second mark set by the Germans in 2002 (3:36.00). Henry also unleashed a remarkable relay split of 52.95, the fastest of all time in Olympic history.

The U.S. team of Kara Lynn Joyce, Natalie Coughlin, Amanda Weir, and Jenny Thompson finished out an American record of 3:36.39 to earn a silver medal, while the Dutch took home the bronze in 3:37.59, after Inge de Bruijn swam a split of 53.37 to hold off the Germans anchored by Franziska van Almsick.

== Records ==
Prior to this competition, the existing world and Olympic records were as follows.

World record	Germany (GER); Katrin Meissner (54.82); Petra Dallmann (53.95); Sandra Völker (53.59); Franziska van Almsick (53.64)	3:36.00	Berlin, Germany	29 July 2002
Olympic record	United States; Amy Van Dyken (55.08); Dara Torres (53.51); Courtney Shealy (54.40); Jenny Thompson (53.62)	3:36.61	Sydney, Australia	16 September 2000

The following new world and Olympic records were set during this competition.

Date	Event	Name	Nationality	Time	Record
August 14	Final	Alice Mills (54.75); Lisbeth Lenton (53.57); Petria Thomas (54.67); Jodie Henry (52.95)	Australia	3:35.94	WR

== Results ==
=== Heats ===
Rank	Heat	Lane	Nation	Swimmers	Time	Notes
1	2	5	Australia	Alice Mills (54.77); Libby Lenton (54.48); Sarah Ryan (54.97); Jodie Henry (54.04)	3:38.26	Q, OC
2	2	4	United States	Amanda Weir (54.50); Colleen Lanne (55.42); Lindsay Benko (54.80); Maritza Correia (54.74)	3:39.46	Q
3	2	3	Netherlands	Inge Dekker (55.56); Annabel Kosten (55.24); Marleen Veldhuis (54.61); Chantal Groot (54.52)	3:39.93	Q
4	1	4	Germany	Petra Dallmann (55.49); Britta Steffen (56.31); Daniela Götz (55.04); Antje Buschschulte (54.35)	3:41.19	Q
5	2	6	Sweden	Josefin Lillhage (55.72); Cathrin Carlzon (56.05); Therese Alshammar (54.33); Johanna Sjöberg (55.41)	3:41.51	Q
6	1	3	Great Britain	Alison Sheppard (56.35); Kathryn Evans (55.21); Karen Pickering (55.57); Melanie Marshall (54.83)	3:41.96	Q
7	1	5	France	Solenne Figuès (55.61); Céline Couderc (55.84); Aurore Mongel (56.25); Malia Metella (54.72)	3:42.42	Q
8	1	6	China	Cheng Jiaru (56.14); Xu Yanwei (55.43); Zhu Yingwen (55.08); Yang Yu (56.19)	3:42.84	Q
9	1	7	South Korea	Sun So-eun (56.86); Ryu Yoon-ji (55.24); Shim Min-ji (56.91); Kim Hyun-joo (55.83)	3:44.84	
10	1	2	Italy	Cecilia Vianini (56.53); Cristina Chiuso (56.33); Sara Parise (57.38); Federica Pellegrini (54.64)	3:44.88	
11	2	2	Belarus	Hanna Shcherba (56.10); Maryia Shcherba (56.78); Iryna Niafedava (56.46); Sviatlana Khakhlova (56.04)	3:45.38	
11	2	7	Brazil	Rebeca Gusmão (56.56); Tatiana Lima (56.67); Renata Burgos (56.32); Flávia Cazziolato (55.83)	3:45.38	
13	1	8	Czech Republic	Jana Myšková (56.02); Petra Klosová (56.49); Ilona Hlaváčková (56.42); Sandra Kazíková (57.90)	3:46.83	
14	1	1	Spain	Tatiana Rouba (56.41); Ana Belén Palomo (56.64); Laura Roca (56.83); Melissa Caballero (57.59)	3:47.47	
15	2	8	Switzerland	Dominique Diezi (56.78); Marjorie Sagne (57.17); Seraina Prünte (58.16); Nicole Zahnd (56.50)	3:48.61	
	2	1	Greece	Nery Mantey Niangkouara (55.79); Zoi Dimoschaki (56.09); Martha Matsa; Eleni Kosti	DSQ	

=== Final ===
Rank	Lane	Nation	Swimmers	Time	Time behind	Notes
1st place, gold medalist(s)	4	Australia	Alice Mills (54.75); Lisbeth Lenton (53.57); Petria Thomas (54.67); Jodie Henry (52.95)	3:35.94		WR
2nd place, silver medalist(s)	5	United States	Kara Lynn Joyce (54.74); Natalie Coughlin (53.83); Amanda Weir (54.05); Jenny Thompson (53.77)	3:36.39	0.45	AM
3rd place, bronze medalist(s)	3	Netherlands	Chantal Groot (55.45); Inge Dekker (54.66); Marleen Veldhuis (54.11); Inge de Bruijn (53.37)	3:37.59	1.65	
4	6	Germany	Antje Buschschulte (54.67); Petra Dallmann (54.79); Daniela Götz (53.99); Franziska van Almsick (54.49)	3:37.94	2.00	
5	1	France	Solenne Figuès (55.36); Céline Couderc (55.20); Aurore Mongel (55.72); Malia Metella (53.95)	3:40.23	4.29	
6	7	Great Britain	Melanie Marshall (55.42); Kathryn Evans (54.33); Karen Pickering (55.58); Lisa Chapman (55.49)	3:40.82	4.88	
7	2	Sweden	Josefin Lillhage (55.77); Johanna Sjöberg (55.90); Therese Alshammar (54.18); Anna-Karin Kammerling (55.37)	3:41.22	5.28	
8	8	China	Cheng Jiaru (56.20); Xu Yanwei (55.19); Yang Yu (56.08); Zhu Yingwen (55.43)	3:42.90	6.96	
