= Swimming at the 2001 Mediterranean Games =

Swimming at the 2005 Mediterranean Games

The Swimming competition at the 2001 Mediterranean Games occurred September 3–7 in Tunis, Tunisia.

== Participating countries ==
19 countries had swimmers at the 2001 Mediterranean Games were:

- Albania
- Algeria
- Andorra
- Bosnia and Herzegovina
- Croatia
- Cyprus
- France
- Greece
- Italy
- Jordan
- Lebanon
- Morocco
- San Marino
- Slovenia
- Spain
- Syria
- Tunisia
- Turkey
- Yugoslavia

== Event schedule ==
| Date | Monday; September 3, 2001 | Tuesday; September 4, 2001 | Wednesday; September 5, 2001 | Thursday; September 6, 2001 | Friday; September 7, 2001 |
| E v e n t s | 200 free (m); 100 free (f); 100 fly (m); 200 fly (f); 100 Handisport (m); 100 Handisport (f); 4 × 200 Free Relay (f) | 200 back (m); 100 back (f); 400 free (m); 200 free (f); 200 breast (m); 100 breast (f); 4 × 200 Free Relay (m) | 50 free (f); 400 IM (m); 400 IM (f); 100 fly (w); 200 fly (m); 800 free (f); 4 × 100 Free Relay (f) | 400 free (f); 100 free (m); 200 breast (f); 100 breast (m); 4 × 100 Medley Relay (f); 4 × 100 Medley Relay (m) | 50 free (m); 200 IM (f); 200 IM (m); 200 back (f); 100 back (m); 1500 free (m); 4 × 100 Free Relay (m) |

== Results ==
=== Men ===
| Event | Gold | | Silver | | Bronze | |
|---|---|---|---|---|---|---|
| 50 m freestyle | Salim Iles; Algeria | 22.86; GR | Chrysanthos Papachrysanthou; Cyprus and Julien Sicot; France | 23.06 | not awarded | |
| 100 m freestyle | Salim Iles; Algeria | 49.91; GR | Peter Mankoč; Slovenia | 50.16 | Mauro Gallo; Italy | 50.31 |
| 200 m freestyle | Emiliano Brembilla; Italy | 1:48.61; GR | Matteo Pelliciari; Italy | 1:49.78 | Thanasis Oikonomou; Greece | 1:51.31 |
| 400 m freestyle | Emiliano Brembilla; Italy | 3:49.27; GR | Spyridon Gianniotis; Greece | 3:53.90 | Thanasis Oikonomou; Greece | 3:55.46 |
| 1500 m freestyle | Spyridon Gianniotis; Greece | 15:26.98 | Emiliano Brembilla; Italy | 15:31.67 | Javier Núñez; Spain | 15:33.07 |
| 100 m backstroke | Aluis Alberto Laera; Italy | 56.00; GR | Blaž Medvešek; Slovenia | 56.28 | David Ortega; Spain | 56.49 |
| 200 m backstroke | Marko Strahija; Croatia | 1:59.87; GR | Simon Dufour; France | 2:01.16 | Jorge Sánchez; Spain | 2:01.83 |
| 100 m breaststroke | Vanja Rogulj; Croatia | 1:02.31 | Hugues Duboscq; France | 1:02.81 | Davide Cassol; Italy | 1:03.09 |
| 200 m breaststroke | Michele Vancini; Italy | 2:13.08; GR | Davide Rummolo; Italy | 2:13.29 | Alfonso Uruburu; Spain | 2:16.97 |
| 100 m butterfly | Franck Esposito; France | 53.66; GR | Mattia Nalesso; Italy | 53.86 | Vladan Marković (Federal Republic of Yugoslavia) Yugoslavia | 54.51 |
| 200 m butterfly | Franck Esposito; France | 1:58.97; GR | Jordi Pau; Spain | 1:59.67 | Christian Galenda; Italy | 2:00.95 |
| 200 m I.M. | Peter Mankoč; Slovenia | 2:03.62 | Simone Giancarini; Italy | 2:03.91 | Ioannis Kokkodis; Greece | 2:04.25 |
| 400 m I.M. | Nicolas Rostoucher; France | 4:24.16 | Oussama Mellouli; Tunisia | 4:25.20 | Raouf Benabid; Algeria | 4:27.50 |
| 4 × 100 m freestyle relay | Italy; Mauro Gallo, Matteo Pelliciari, Michele Scarica, Simone Cercato | 3:21.25; GR | France; Sebastien Lequeux, Hugo Viart, Frédérick Bousquet, Nicolas Kintz | 3:21.65 | Croatia; Marijan Kanjer, Igor Čerenšek, Lovrenco Franičević, Ivan Mladina | 3:23.00 |
| 4 × 200 m freestyle relay | Greece; Dimitrios Manganas, Nikos Xylouris, Thanasis Oikonomou, Spyridon Gianniotis | 7:23.33; GR | Italy; David Berbotto, Simone Cercato, Matteo Pelliciari, Emiliano Brembilla | 7:23.38 | France; Emmanuel Devreau, Simon Dufour, Hugo Viart, Nicolas Kintz | 7:24.16 |
| 4 × 100 m medley relay | Italy; Luis Alberto Laera, Davide Rummolo, Mattia Nalesso, Simone Cercato | 3:42.49; GR | Croatia; Marko Strahija, Vanja Rogulj, Miloš Milošević, Ivan Mladina | 3:44.22 | France; Simon Dufour, Hugues Duboscq, Franck Esposito, Nicolas Kintz | 3:44.30 |
| 100 m freestyle Handisports | Santiago Flores; Spain | 59.14 | David Levecq; Spain | 1:00.17 | Stefanos Ioannidis; Greece | 1:01.78 |

=== Women ===
| Event | Gold | | Silver | | Bronze | |
|---|---|---|---|---|---|---|
| 50 m freestyle | Ana Belén Palomo; Spain | 25.98 | Cristina Chiuso; Italy | 26.28 | Cecilia Vianini; Italy | 26.50 |
| 100 m freestyle | Laura Roca; Spain | 57.23 | Nery Mantey Niangkouara; Greece | 57.41 | Sanja Jovanović; Croatia | 57.65 |
| 200 m freestyle | Zoi Dimoschaki; Greece | 2:02.09; GR | Laura Roca; Spain | 2:02.29 | Cecilia Vianini; Italy | 2:02.30 |
| 400 m freestyle | Anja Čarman; Slovenia | 4:13.89; GR | Alicia Bozon; France | 4:17.51 | Marianna Lymperta; Greece | 4:17.96 |
| 800 m freestyle | Erika Villaécija; Spain | 8:50.36 | Marion Perrotin; France | 8:52.52 | Melissa Pasquali; Italy | 8:53.02 |
| 100 m backstroke | Nina Zhivanevskaya; Spain | 1:02.34; GR | Aikaterini Bliamou; Greece | 1:03.89 | Sanja Jovanović; Croatia | 1:04.40 |
| 200 m backstroke | Nina Zhivanevskaya; Spain | 2:12.95; GR | Roxana Mărăcineanu; France | 2:14.19 | Anja Čarman; Slovenia | 2:16.12 |
| 100 m breaststroke | Roberta Crescentini; Italy | 1:11.00 | İlkay Dikmen; Turkey | 1:11.17 | Roberta Panara; Italy | 1:11.39 |
| 200 m breaststroke | Chiara Boggiatto; Italy | 2:31.00; GR | İlkay Dikmen; Turkey | 2:32.34 | Judith Llach; Spain | 2:33.58 |
| 100 m butterfly | Malia Metella; France | 1:01.31 | Mireia García; Spain | 1:01.33 | Maria Papadopoulou; Cyprus | 1:01.67 |
| 200 m butterfly | Mireia García; Spain | 2:11.28; GR | Paola Cavallino; Italy | 2:13.85 | María Peláez; Spain | 2:14.65 |
| 200 m I.M. | Paula Carballido; Spain | 2:17.80; GR | Tatiana Rouba; Spain | 2:18.64 | Sophie de Ronchi; France | 2:18.98 |
| 400 m I.M. | Paula Carballido; Spain | 4:46.64; GR | Federica Biscia; Italy | 4:50.57 | Veronica Massari; Italy | 4:53.45 |
| 4 × 100 m freestyle relay | Spain; Nina Zhivanevskaya, Lidia Elizalde, Ana Belén Palomo, Laura Roca | 3:48.26; GR | Greece; Nery Mantey Niangkouara, Antonia Machaira, Zampia Melachroinou, Zoi Dimoschaki | 3:48.74 | Italy; Luisa Striani, Cristina Chiuso, Roberta Panara, Cecilia Vianini | 3:48.96 |
| 4 × 200 m freestyle relay | Spain; Lidia Elizalde, Tatiana Rouba, Paula Carballido, Laura Roca | 8:13.30 | Greece; Marianna Lymperta, Zampia Melachroinou, Evangelia Tsagka, Zoi Dimoschaki | 8:16.14 | Italy; Luisa Striani, Sara Goffi, Veronica Massari, Cecilia Vianini | 8:17.17 |
| 4 × 100 m medley relay | Spain; Nina Zhivanevskaya, Judith Llach, Mireia García, Laura Roca | 4:12.12; GR | Italy; Valentina De Nardi, Roberta Crescentini, Luisa Striani, Cecilia Vianini | 4:15.55 | Greece; Aikaterini Bliamou, Vasiliki Kavarnou, Eirini Kavarnou, Nery Mantey Niangkouara | 4:17.70 |
| 100 m free handisports | Esther Morales; Spain | 1:07.80 | Ana Sršen; Croatia | 1:12.21 | Almudena de la Osa; Spain | 1:12.31 |

=== Medal tables ===
* Host nation (Tunisia)

| Rank | Nation | Gold | Silver | Bronze | Total |
|---|---|---|---|---|---|
| 1 | Spain | 13 | 5 | 7 | 25 |
| 2 | Italy | 8 | 10 | 10 | 28 |
| 3 | France | 4 | 7 | 3 | 14 |
| 4 | Greece | 3 | 6 | 6 | 15 |
| 5 | Croatia | 2 | 2 | 3 | 7 |
| 6 | Slovenia | 2 | 2 | 1 | 5 |
| Totals (6 entries) | | 32 | 32 | 30 | 94 |
