= List of Greek records in swimming =

The Greek records in swimming are the fastest ever performances of swimmers from Greece, which are recognised and ratified by the Hellenic Swimming Federation (KOE).

All records were set in finals unless noted otherwise.

== Long Course (50 m) ==
=== Men ===
Event	Time		Name	Club	Date	Meet	Location	Ref
50 m freestyle	21.44		Kristian Gkolomeev	Greece	9 August 2018	European Championships	Glasgow, Great Britain	
50 m freestyle	20.81	unofficial	Kristian Gkolomeev	Greece	24 May 2026	Enhanced Games	Las Vegas, United States	
100 m freestyle	48.31	r	Andreas Vazaios	Aopf	16 May 2026	Greek Championships	Athens, Greece	
100 m freestyle	46.60	unofficial	Kristian Gkolomeev	Greece	24 May 2026	Enhanced Games	Las Vegas, United States	
200 m freestyle	1:44.93	r	Dimitrios Markos	Greece	10 August 2026	European Championships	Paris, France	
400 m freestyle	3:47.44		Dimitrios Markos	Greece	23 June 2024	European Championships	Belgrade, Serbia	
400 m freestyle	3:47.07	#	Dimitrios Markos	Greece	22 August 2026	Mediterranean Games	Taranto, Italy	
800 m freestyle	7:43.52		Dimitrios Markos	Greece	12 August 2026	European Championships	Paris, France	
1500 m freestyle	14:53.32	h	Spyridon Gianniotis	Greece	15 August 2008	Olympic Games	Beijing, China	
50 m backstroke	24.15		Apostolos Christou	Greece	14 August 2026	European Championships	Paris, France	
100 m backstroke	52.09	sf	Apostolos Christou	Greece	19 June 2022 (Note: by official result source; 18 June 2022 by KOE source, a typo)	World Championships	Budapest, Hungary	
200 m backstroke	1:53.81		Apostolos Siskos	Greece	12 August 2026	European Championships	Paris, France	
50m breaststroke	27.20	h	Dimitrios Xynadas	Greece	28 July 2009	World Championships	Rome, Italy	
100m breaststroke	59.77	sf	Evangelos Efraim Ntoumas	Greece	19 August 2025	World Junior Championships	Otopeni, Romania	
200m breaststroke	2:09.72		Panagiotis Samilidis	Greece	24 May 2012	European Championships	Debrecen, Hungary	
50m butterfly	22.79	sf	Stergios-Marios Bilas	Greece	10 August 2026	European Championships	Paris, France	
100m butterfly	52.41	h	Sotirios Pastras	Greece	9 August 2008	Olympic Games	Beijing, China	
200m butterfly	1:54.13		Apostolos Siskos	Greece	15 August 2026	European Championships	Paris, France	
200m individual medley	1:57.98	sf	Andreas Vazaios	Greece	26 July 2017	World Championships	Budapest, Hungary	
400m individual medley	4:10.83		Apostolos Papastamos	Greece	17 June 2024	European Championships	Belgrade, Serbia	
4×100m freestyle relay	3:13.39		Apostolos Christou (48.39); Kristian Gkolomeev (47.77); Odysseus Meladinis (49.09); Andreas Vazaios (48.14)	Greece	17 May 2021	European Championships	Budapest, Hungary	
4×200m freestyle relay	7:08.15		Dimitrios Markos (1:44.93); Konstantinos Englezakis (1:47.81); Konstantinos Stamou (1:47.57); Andreas Vazaios (1:47.84)	Greece	10 August 2026	European Championships	Paris, France	
4×100m medley relay	3:33.67	h	Evangelos Makrygiannis (53.94); Evangelos Efraim Ntoumas (1:00.81); Apostolos Siskos (51.64); Stergios-Marios Bilas (47.28)	Greece	16 August 2026	European Championships	Paris, France	

Legend: # – Record awaiting ratification by KOE; WR – World record; ER – European record; e – equalled existing record;
Records not set in finals: h – heat; sf – semifinal; r – relay 1st leg; rh – relay heat 1st leg; b – B final; † – en route to final mark; so – swim-off; tt – time trial

=== Women ===
Event	Time		Name	Club	Date	Meet	Location	Ref
50m freestyle	24.59		Theodora Drakou	Greece	22 June 2024	European Championships	Belgrade, Serbia	
100m freestyle	54.48		Nery Mantey Niangkouara	Greece	2 August 2006	European Championships	Budapest, Hungary	
200m freestyle	1:59.93	sf	Zoi Dimoschaki	Greece	22 July 2003	World Championships	Barcelona, Spain	
400m freestyle	4:10.57		Artemis Vasilaki	Greece	21 March 2026	Giant Open	Saint-Denis, France	
800m freestyle	8:26.38		Artemis Vasilaki	Greece	11 August 2026	European Championships	Paris, France	
1500 m freestyle	16:13.81	h	Artemis Vasilaki	Greece	13 August 2026	European Championships	Paris, France	
50m backstroke	27.75	sf	Theodora Drakou	Greece	30 July 2025	World Championships	Singapore, Singapore	
100m backstroke	1:00.71	rh	Theodora Drakou	Greece	30 July 2023	World Championships	Fukuoka, Japan	
200m backstroke	2:12.64		Ioanna Sacha	University of Houston	13 February 2021	UH Invite	Houston, United States	
50m breaststroke	30.85		Maria-Thaleia Drasidou	Aopf	17 February 2023	Greek Winter Championships	Athens, Greece	
100m breaststroke	1:08.16		Andromachi Tasakou	Olympiacos	8 May 2026	Acropolis Open	Athens, Greece	
200m breaststroke	2:27.39		Angeliki Exarchou	Greece	15 May 2009	-	Ostrava, Czech Republic	
50m butterfly	25.63		Anna Ntountounaki	Pao	27 April 2025	International Meet "Faros - Elena Sairi"	Alexandroupolis, Greece	
100m butterfly	56.99	sf	Anna Ntountounaki	Greece	13 August 2026	European Championships	Paris, France	
200m butterfly	2:08.39	sf	Georgia Damasioti	Greece	30 July 2025	World Championships	Singapore, Singapore	
200m individual medley	2:12.51	sf	Nikoletta Pavlopoulou	Greece	14 August 2026	European Championships	Paris, France	
400m individual medley	4:44.90	h	Vasiliki Angelopoulou	Greece	14 August 2004	Olympic Games	Athens, Greece	
4×100m freestyle relay	3:42.09		Theodora Drakou (55.76); Theodora Giareni (56.09); Nery Mantey Niangkouara (54.50); Kristel Vourna (55.74)	Greece	21 May 2012	European Championships	Debrecen, Hungary	
4×200m freestyle relay	8:13.59	h	Artemis Vasilaki (2:02.50); Zacharoula Kalogeri (2:02.74); Maria Zafeiratou (2:04.04); Anastasia Boutou (2:04.31)	Greece	15 February 2024	World Championships	Doha, Qatar	
4×100m medley relay	4:04.01	h	Theodora Drakou (1:01.47); Eleni Kontogeorgou (1:09.01); Anna Ntountounaki (57.79); Maria Thaleia Drasidou (55.74)	Greece	16 February 2024	World Championships	Doha, Qatar	

=== Mixed relay ===
Event	Time		Name	Club	Date	Meet	Location	Ref
4×100m freestyle relay	3:28.96	h	Andreas Vazaios (49.19); Stergios Bilas (48.49); Theodora Drakou (55.05); Maria-Thaleia Drasidou (56.23)	Greece	29 July 2023 (Note: by official result source; 23 July 2023 by KOE source, a typo)	World Championships	Fukuoka, Japan	
4×200 m freestyle relay	7:45.17	h	Konstantinos Englezakis (1:48.96); Konstantinos Stamou (1:49.15); Nikoletta Pavlopoulou (2:02.69); Artemis Vasilaki (2:04.37)	Greece	15 August 2026	European Championships	Paris, France	
4×100m medley relay	3:44.77	h	Apostolos Christou (53.18); Konstantinos Meretsolias (1:00.10); Anna Ntountounaki (57.08); Theodora Drakou (54.41)	Greece	29 July 2021	Olympic Games	Tokyo, Japan	

Legend: # – Record awaiting ratification by KOE; WR – World record; ER – European record; e – equalled existing record;
Records not set in finals: h – heat; sf – semifinal; r – relay 1st leg; rh – relay heat 1st leg; b – B final; † – en route to final mark; so – swim-off; tt – time trial

== Short Course (25 m) ==
=== Men ===
Event	Time		Name	Club	Date	Meet	Location	Ref
50m freestyle	20.75		Kristian Gkolomeev	LA Current	21 November 2020	International Swimming League	Budapest, Hungary	
100m freestyle	46.66	sf	Apostolos Christou	Greece	6 November 2021	European Championships	Kazan, Russia	
200m freestyle	1:43.82	h	Dimitrios Markos	Greece	3 December 2025	European Championships	Lublin, Poland	
400m freestyle	3:40.63	h	Dimitrios Markos	Greece	5 December 2023	European Championships	Otopeni, Romania	
800m freestyle	7:36.39	h	Dimitrios Markos	Greece	9 December 2023	European Championships	Otopeni, Romania	
1500m freestyle	14:47.89		Vasileios Kakoulakis	Greece	7 November 2025	Grand Prix Brno	Brno, Czech Republic	
50m backstroke	22.87	sf	Apostolos Christou	Greece	2 November 2021	European Championships	Kazan, Russia	
100m backstroke	49.66	sf	Apostolos Christou	Greece	13 December 2022	World Championships	Melbourne, Australia	
200m backstroke	1:50.26		Apostolos Siskos	Greece	3 December 2025	European Championships	Lublin, Poland	
50m breaststroke	26.46		Dimitrios Xynadas	Greece	12 December 2009	European Championships	Istanbul, Turkey	
100m breaststroke	58.08		Romanos Alyfantis	Greece	9 December 2005	European Championships	Trieste, Italy	
200m breaststroke	2:08.94		Dimitrios Koulouris	Panathinaikos	19 December 2015	Christmas Grand Prix	Karpenisi, Greece	
50m butterfly	22.70		Andreas Vazaios	Greece	10 October 2026	International Meeting of Saint-Dizier	Saint-Dizier, France	
100m butterfly	50.13		Andreas Vazaios	Loughborough	20 November 2021	BUCS Championships	Sheffield, Great Britain	
200m butterfly	1:50.23		Andreas Vazaios	Greece	8 December 2019	European Championships	Glasgow, Great Britain	
100m individual medley	51.47	sf	Andreas Vazaios	Greece	15 December 2022	World Championships	Melbourne, Australia	
200m individual medley	1:50.85		Andreas Vazaios	Greece	6 December 2019	European Championships	Glasgow, Great Britain	
400m individual medley	4:03.37		Andreas Vazaios	DC Trident	30 September 2021	International Swimming League	Naples, Italy	
4×50m freestyle relay	1:23.27		Kristian Gkolomeev (21.15); Stergios-Marios Bilas (21.02); Apostolos Christou (20.58); Andreas Vazaios (20.52)	Greece	5 December 2023	European Championships	Otopeni, Romania	
4×100m freestyle relay	3:22.31	h	Alexandros Tsoltos (51.06); Paschalis Datsos (50.49); Dimitrios Manganas (50.88); Spyridon Bitsakis (49.88)	Greece	16 March 2000	World Championships	Athens, Greece	
4×200m freestyle relay	7:11.33	h	Alexandros Tsoltos (1:49.34); Spyridon Gianniotis (1:47.62); Dimitrios Manganas (1:47.27); Athanasios Oikonomou (1:47.10)	Greece	4 April 2002	World Championships	Moscow, Russia	
4×50m medley relay	1:38.47	h	Andreas Vazaios (25.37); Panagiotis Samilidis (27.45); Stefanos Dimitriadis (24.01); Kristian Gkolomeev (21.64)	Greece	8 December 2011	European Championships	Szczecin, Poland	
4×100m medley relay	3:44.15		Ioannis Kokkodis (55.53); Andreas Zeppos (1:03.17); George Popotas (55.38); Paschalis Datsos (50.07)	Greece	19 March 2000	World Championships	Athens, Greece	

Legend: # – Record awaiting ratification by KOE; WR – World record; ER – European record; e – equalled existing record;
Records not set in finals: h – heat; sf – semifinal; r – relay 1st leg; rh – relay heat 1st leg; b – B final; † – en route to final mark; so – swim-off; tt – time trial

=== Women ===
Event	Time		Name	Club	Date	Meet	Location	Ref
50m freestyle	24.58	h	Theodora Drakou	Greece	14 December 2024	World Championships	Budapest, Hungary	
100m freestyle	54.06	sf	Nery Mantey Niangkouara	Greece	11 December 2003	European Championships	Dublin, Ireland	
200m freestyle	1:59.29		Zoi Dimoschaki	Panathinaikos	29 November 2003	-	Volos, Greece	
400m freestyle	4:07.39		Zoi Dimoschaki	Greece	15 December 2001	European Championships	Antwerp, Belgium	
800m freestyle	8:20.02	h	Artemis Vasilaki	Greece	4 December 2025	European Championships	Lublin, Poland	
1500m freestyle	15:51.78		Artemis Vasilaki	Greece	7 December 2025	European Championships	Lublin, Poland	
50m backstroke	27.14	h	Theodora Drakou	Greece	12 December 2024	World Championships	Budapest, Hungary	
100m backstroke	59.51		Theodora Drakou	Aqua Centurions	2 November 2020	International Swimming League	Budapest, Hungary	
200m backstroke	2:07.76		Ioanna Sacha	University of Edinburgh	10 December 2021	Scottish Winter Meet	Edinburgh, Great Britain	
50m breaststroke	30.62	sf	Maria-Thaleia Drasidou	Greece	6 November 2021	European Championships	Kazan, Russia	
100m breaststroke	1:06.36		Chara Angelaki	N. O. I.	19 October 2024	1st Performance Race	Chalandri, Greece	
200m breaststroke	2:24.86		Eleni Kontogeorgou	Osfp	11 November 2023	Kolymvitikos Agonas Epidoseon	Halandri, Greece	
200m breaststroke	2:24.02	not ratified	Chara Angelaki	N. O. I.	20 October 2024	1st Performance Race	Chalandri, Greece	
50m butterfly	25.04	sf, so	Anna Ntountounaki	Greece	2 December 2025	European Championships	Lublin, Poland	
100m butterfly	55.66	sf	Anna Ntountounaki	Greece	4 December 2025	European Championships	Lublin, Poland	
200m butterfly	2:05.79	sf	Georgia Damasioti	Greece	6 December 2025	European Championships	Lublin, Poland	
100m individual medley	1:00.00	sf	Nikoletta Pavlopoulou	Greece	3 December 2025	European Championships	Lublin, Poland	
200m individual medley	2:09.27	sf	Nikoletta Pavlopoulou	Greece	5 December 2025	European Championships	Lublin, Poland	
400m individual medley	4:37.36		Lysistrati Halkides	Greece	15 November 2009	World Cup	Berlin, Germany	
4×50m freestyle relay	1:41.17		Nery Mantey Niangkouara (25.07); Antonia Machaira (25.03); Zampia Melachroinou (25.58); Zoi Dimoschaki (25.49)	Greece	12 December 2003	European Championships	Dublin, Ireland	
4×100m freestyle relay	3:44.20		Eleonora Markou; Antonia Machaira; Zampia Melachroinou; Eirini Kosta	Greece	18 March 2000	World Championships	Athens, Greece	
4×200m freestyle relay	8:03.58		Zoi Dimoschaki (2:00.46); Zampia Melachroinou (2:00.65); Evangelia Tsagka (2:02.07); Marianna Lymperta (2:00.40)	Greece	3 April 2002	World Championships	Moscow, Russia	
4×50m medley relay	1:55.49	h	Aspasia Petradaki (28.95); Maria Michalaka (32.47); Kristel Vourna (27.85); Theodora Drakou (26.22)	Greece	13 December 2008	European Championships	Rijeka, Croatia	
4×100m medley relay	4:15.16	h	Aikaterini Bliamou (1:02.87); Vassiliki Kavarnou (1:13.46); Eirini Kavarnou (1:02.12); Antonia Machaira (56.71)	Greece	19 March 2000	World Championships	Athens, Greece	

Legend: # – Record awaiting ratification by KOE; WR – World record; ER – European record; e – equalled existing record;
Records not set in finals: h – heat; sf – semifinal; r – relay 1st leg; rh – relay heat 1st leg; b – B final; † – en route to final mark; so – swim-off; tt – time trial

=== Mixed relay ===
Event	Time	Name	Club	Date	Meet	Location	Ref
4×50 m freestyle relay							
4×50 m medley relay	1:39.51	Apostolos Christou (23.34); Maria-Thaleia Drasidou (30.04); Anna Ntountounaki (25.01); Andreas Vazaios (21.12)	Greece	18 December 2021	World Championships	Abu Dhabi, United Arab Emirates	

Legend: # – Record awaiting ratification by KOE; WR – World record; ER – European record; e – equalled existing record;
Records not set in finals: h – heat; sf – semifinal; r – relay 1st leg; rh – relay heat 1st leg; b – B final; † – en route to final mark; so – swim-off; tt – time trial
