= List of gold medalist relay teams in swimming at the Olympics and World Aquatics Championships =

This is an overview of the gold medalist relay teams in swimming at the Olympics and the World Aquatics Championships. These tournaments are the only global long course (50-meter pool) swimming championships organized by world swimming federation FINA. This list gives an overview of the dominant swimming relay nations throughout the history of swimming.

Currently, the Olympic program includes six relay events (three for men, three for women), while the World Championships program includes eight events (three for men, three for women, two mixed). These numbers were lower in the past, as shown in the table.

Flags link to the country. Names of countries link to the event article. Use the sort function in the left-hand column to separate Olympics and World Championships.

Year	Men			Women			Mixed	
Year	4×100 m freestyle	4×200 m freestyle	4×100 m medley	4×100 m freestyle	4×200 m freestyle	4×100 m medley	4×100 m freestyle	4×100 m medley
OG 1900	–	Germany (team)	–	–	–	–	–	–
OG 1904	United States (4×50 yd)	–	–	–	–	–	–	–
OG 1908	–	(United Kingdom) Great Britain	–	–	–	–	–	–
OG 1912	–	Australasia	–	(United Kingdom) Great Britain	–	–	–	–
OG 1920	–	United States	–	United States	–	–	–	–
OG 1924	–	United States	–	United States	–	–	–	–
OG 1928	–	United States	–	United States	–	–	–	–
OG 1932	–	Japan	–	United States	–	–	–	–
OG 1936	–	Japan	–	Netherlands	–	–	–	–
OG 1948	–	United States	–	United States	–	–	–	–
OG 1952	–	United States	–	Hungary	–	–	–	–
OG 1956	–	Australia	–	Australia	–	–	–	–
OG 1960	–	United States	United States	United States	–	United States	–	–
OG 1964	United States	United States	United States	United States	–	United States	–	–
OG 1968	United States	United States	United States	United States	–	United States	–	–
OG 1972	United States	United States	United States	United States	–	United States	–	–
WC 1973	United States	United States	United States	East Germany	–	East Germany	–	–
WC 1975	United States	West Germany	United States	East Germany	–	East Germany	–	–
OG 1976	–	United States	United States	United States	–	East Germany	–	–
WC 1978	United States	United States	United States	United States	–	United States	–	–
OG 1980	–	Soviet Union	Australia	East Germany	–	East Germany	–	–
WC 1982	United States	United States	United States	East Germany	–	East Germany	–	–
OG 1984	United States	United States	United States	United States	–	United States	–	–
WC 1986	United States	East Germany	United States	East Germany	East Germany	East Germany	–	–
OG 1988	United States	United States	United States	East Germany	–	East Germany	–	–
WC 1991	United States	Germany	United States	United States	Germany	United States	–	–
OG 1992	United States	Unified Team	United States	United States	–	United States	–	–
WC 1994	United States	Sweden	United States	China	China	China	–	–
OG 1996	United States	United States	United States	United States	United States	United States	–	–
WC 1998	United States	Australia	Australia	United States	Germany	United States	–	–
OG 2000	Australia	Australia	United States	United States	United States	United States	–	–
WC 2001	Australia	Australia	Australia	Germany	(United Kingdom) Great Britain	Australia	–	–
WC 2003	Russia	Australia	United States	United States	United States	China	–	–
OG 2004	South Africa	United States	United States	Australia	United States	Australia	–	–
WC 2005	United States	United States	United States	Australia	United States	Australia	–	–
WC 2007	United States	United States	Australia	Australia	United States	Australia	–	–
OG 2008	United States	United States	United States	Netherlands	Australia	Australia	–	–
WC 2009	United States	United States	United States	Netherlands	China	China	–	–
WC 2011	Australia	United States	United States	Netherlands	United States	United States	–	–
OG 2012	France	United States	United States	Australia	United States	United States	–	–
WC 2013	France	United States	France	United States	United States	United States	–	–
WC 2015	France	(United Kingdom) Great Britain	United States	Australia	United States	China	United States	(United Kingdom) Great Britain
OG 2016	United States	United States	United States	Australia	United States	United States	–	–
WC 2017	United States	(United Kingdom) Great Britain	United States	United States	United States	United States	United States	United States
WC 2019	United States	Australia	(United Kingdom) Great Britain	Australia	Australia	United States	United States	Australia
OG 2020	United States	(United Kingdom) Great Britain	United States	Australia	China	Australia	–	(United Kingdom) Great Britain
WC 2022	United States	United States	Italy	Australia	United States	United States	Australia	United States
WC 2023	Australia	(United Kingdom) Great Britain	United States	Australia	Australia	United States	Australia	China
WC 2024	China	China	United States	Netherlands	China	Australia	China	United States
OG 2024	United States	(United Kingdom) Great Britain	China	Australia	Australia	United States	–	United States
WC 2025	Australia	(United Kingdom) Great Britain	Neutral Athletes B	Australia	Australia	United States	United States	Neutral Athletes B

Note: Only events that are presently contested have their own column in the above table. In the early Olympics, two team events have been held that were discontinued later on; the men's 200-meter team race in 1900, and the men's 4 × 50 yard relay in 1904. These events have been located in a column corresponding to the most similar event and the nearest distance, respectively.

== Medal table ==
Rank	Country	Total titles	Olympic Games	World Championships	OG (men)	OG (women)	OG (mixed)	WC (men)	WC (women)	WC (mixed)	Time span
1.	United States	143	74	69	43	30	1	38	24	7	1904–2025
2.	Australia	43	15	28	4	11	–	11	14	3	1956–2025
3.	East Germany	15	5	10	–	5	–	1	9	–	1973–1988
4.	China	14	2	12	1	1	–	2	8	2	1994–2024
5.	Great Britain	12	5	7	3	1	1	5	1	1	1908–2025
6.	Netherlands	5	2	3	–	2	–	–	3	–	1936–2024
6.	Germany	5	1	4	1	–	–	1	3	–	1900–2001
8.	France	4	1	3	1	–	–	3	–	–	2012–2015
9.	Japan	2	2	–	2	–	–	–	–	–	1932–1936
9.	Neutral Athletes B	2	–	2	–	–	–	1	–	1	2025
11.	Australasia	1	1	–	1	–	–	–	–	–	1912
11.	Hungary	1	1	–	–	1	–	–	–	–	1952
11.	Soviet Union	1	1	–	1	–	–	–	–	–	1980
11.	Unified Team	1	1	–	1	–	–	–	–	–	1992
11.	South Africa	1	1	–	1	–	–	–	–	–	2004
11.	West Germany	1	–	1	–	–	–	1	–	–	1975
11.	Sweden	1	–	1	–	–	–	1	–	–	1994
11.	Russia	1	–	1	–	–	–	1	–	–	2003
11.	Italy	1	–	1	–	–	–	1	–	–	2022
Total		231	103	128	56	47	1	61	57	10	1900–2025

Italics denotes countries that no longer exist. OG = Olympic Games, WC = World Aquatics Championships. Sorted for 1) total titles, 2) Olympic titles, 3) year of first title.

== See also ==
- List of individual gold medalists in swimming at the Olympics and World Aquatics Championships (men)
- List of individual gold medalists in swimming at the Olympics and World Aquatics Championships (women)
- List of Olympic medalists in swimming (men)
- List of Olympic medalists in swimming (women)
- List of World Aquatics Championships medalists in swimming (men)
- List of World Aquatics Championships medalists in swimming (women)
