= Swimming at the 2001 World Aquatics Championships – Women's 4 × 100 metre freestyle relay =

Women's 4×100 metre freestyle relay at the 2001 World Aquatics Championships
- Dates: 23 July 2001
- Winning time: 3:39.58

Medalists
gold medal	Petra Dallmann; Antje Buschschulte; Katrin Meissner; Sandra Völker	Germany
silver medal	Alison Sheppard; Melanie Marshall; Rosalind Brett; Karen Pickering	Great Britain
silver medal	Colleen Lanne; Erin Phenix; Maritza Correia; Courtney Shealy	United States

The women's 4 × 100 metre freestyle relay event at the 2001 World Aquatics Championships took place in Marine Messe in Fukuoka, Japan on 23 July 2001.

At the start of the event, the World (WR) and Championship (CR) records were:

- WR: 3:36.61 swum by United States on September 16, 2000, in Sydney, Australia.
- CR: 3:37.91 swum by China on September 7, 1994, in Rome, Italy.

== Results ==
=== Heats ===
Place	Heat	Lane	Nation	Swimmers (split)	Time	Notes
1	1	5	Germany	Petra Dallmann (55.80); Antje Buschschulte (54.53); Katrin Meissner (54.94); Meike Freitag (56.13)	3:41.40	Q
2	2	4	United States	Tammie Stone (55.75); Stefanie Williams (55.84); Erin Phenix (54.74); Courtney Shealy (55.16)	3:41.49	Q
3	2	3	Australia	Sarah Ryan (55.14); Elka Graham (55.42); Jodie Henry (55.81); Giaan Rooney (55.39)	3:41.76	Q
4	1	3	United Kingdom	Alison Sheppard (55.97); Melanie Marshall (55.48); Rosalind Brett (55.09); Karen Pickering (55.38)	3:41.92	Q
5	2	6	China	Yang Yu (55.95); Han Xue (56.41); Zhu Yingwen (55.75); Xu Yanwei (54.77)	3:42.88	Q
6	2	5	Sweden	Johanna Sjöberg (56.33); Josefin Lillhage (55.76); Cathrin Carlzon (56.13); Therese Alshammar (55.01)	3:43.23	Q
7	1	6	Italy	Luisa Striani (56.07); Cristina Chiuso (56.16); Sara Parise (56.38); Cecilia Vianini (54.97)	3:43.58	Q
8	2	2	Japan	Tomoko Nagai (56.16); Maki Mita (55.84); Eri Yamanoi (56.81); Sumika Minamoto (54.90)	3:43.71	Q
9	1	2	Canada	Laura Nicholls (56.25); Marianne Limpert (55.66); Jessica Deglau (56.92); Sophie Simard (57.20)	3:46.03	
10	1	4	Netherlands	Manon van Rooijen (56.75); Chantal Groot (56.34); Hinkelien Schreuder (56.11); Wilma van Hofwegen (57.34)	3:46.54	
11	1	7	Singapore	Christel Bouvron (59.95); Rebecca Heng (1:02.95); Nicolette Teo (59.56); Jacqueline Lim (59.57)	4:02.03	
12	2	7	Chinese Taipei	Sung Yi-Chien (1:00.01); Lin Chi-Chan (58.98); Lee Huei-Yun (1:03.44); Kuan Chia-Hsien (1:00.22)	4:02.65	
13	2	1	Macau	Weng Tong Cheong (1:02.41); Wai Man Lam (1:04.04); Weng Lam Cheong (1:04.65); Shun Kwan Andrea Chum (1:03.67)	4:14.77	

=== Final ===
Place	Lane	Nation	Swimmers (split)	Time	Notes
1st place, gold medalist(s)	4	Germany	Petra Dallmann (55.33); Antje Buschschulte (55.13); Katrin Meissner (54.07); Sandra Völker (55.05)	3:39.58	
2nd place, silver medalist(s)	6	United Kingdom	Alison Sheppard (56.15); Melanie Marshall (55.22); Rosalind Brett (54.76); Karen Pickering (54.67)	3:40.80	
2nd place, silver medalist(s)	5	United States	Colleen Lanne (56.15); Erin Phenix (54.68); Maritza Correia (54.94); Courtney Shealy (55.03)	3:40.80	
4	7	Sweden	Josefin Lillhage (56.19); Johanna Sjöberg (54.79); Therese Alshammar (54.58); Anna-Karin Kammerling (55.62)	3:41.18	
5	2	China	Yang Yu (55.89); Han Xue (55.77); Zhu Yingwen (55.31); Xu Yanwei (54.35)	3:41.32	
6	3	Australia	Sarah Ryan (55.22); Petria Thomas (55.68); Lori Munz (55.57); Giaan Rooney (55.54)	3:42.01	
7	8	Japan	Tomoko Nagai (56.00); Maki Mita (55.83); Sumika Minamoto (55.04); Eri Yamanoi (56.20)	3:43.07	
8	1	Italy	Luisa Striani (56.64); Cristina Chiuso (56.11); Sara Parise (56.06); Cecilia Vianini (55.86)	3:44.67	
