= Swimming at the 2003 World Aquatics Championships – Women's 200 metre individual medley =

Women's 200m I.M. at the 2003 FINA World Aquatics Championships
- Dates: 20 July 2003 (prelims, semifinals); 21 July 2003 (final)

Medalists
gold medal	Yana Klochkova	Ukraine
silver medal	Alice Mills	Australia
bronze medal	Yafei Zhou	China

The Women's 200m Individual Medley event at the 10th FINA World Aquatics Championships swam 20–21 July 2003 in Barcelona, Spain. Preliminary heats swam in the morning session of 20 July, with the top-16 finishers advancing to semifinal heats that evening. The top-8 finishers from the Semifinals then advanced to swim again in the Final the next evening.

At the start of the event, the World (WR) and Championship (CR) records were:

- WR: 2:09.72 swum by Yanyan Wu (China) on October 17, 1997 in Shanghai, China.
- CR: 2:10.86 swum by Yanyan Wu (China) on January 16, 1998 in Perth, Australia

== Results ==
=== Final ===
Place	Swimmer	Nation	Time	Notes
1	Yana Klochkova	Ukraine	2:10.75	CR
2	Alice Mills	Australia	2:12.75	
3	Yafei Zhou	China	2:12.92	
4	Hui Qi	China	2:14.51	
5	Maggie Bowen	USA	2:14.60	
6	Ágnes Kovács	Hungary	2:14.63	
7	Beatrice Câșlaru	Romania	2:14.65	
8	Hanna Scherba	Belarus	2:16.70	

=== Semifinals ===
Rank	Heat + Lane	Swimmer	Nation	Time	Notes
1	S2 L4	Yana Klochkova	Ukraine	2:13.63	q
2	S2 L3	Alice Mills	Australia	2:13.69	q
3	S1 L4	Yafei Zhou	China	2:13.79	q
4	S1 L6	Hanna Scherba	Belarus	2:14.17	q
5	S2 L2	Ágnes Kovács	Hungary	2:14.32	q
6	S2 L6	Beatrice Câșlaru	Romania	2:14.71	q
7	S1 L7	Hui Qi	China	2:14.74	q
8	S2 L5	Maggie Bowen	USA	2:14.79	q
9	S2 L7	Kirsty Coventry	Zimbabwe	2:14.88	
10	S2 L1	Gabrielle Rose	USA	2:15.02	
11	S1 L3	Marianne Limpert	Canada	2:15.14	
12	S1 L5	Alenka Kejžar	Slovenia	2:15.15	
13	S1 L2	Elizabeth Warden	Canada	2:15.43	
14	S1 L8	Maiko Fujino	Japan	2:16.58	
15	S1 L1	Tatiana Rouba	Spain	2:16.73	
16	S2 L8	Sara Parise	Italy	2:16.75	

=== Preliminaries ===
Rank	Heat+Lane	Swimmer	Nation	Time	Notes
1	H8 L4	Yana Klochkova	Ukraine	2:13.74	q
2	H8 L6	Yafei Zhou	China	2:13.91	q
3	H6 L5	Maggie Bowen	United States	2:14.88	q
4	H7 L3	Alenka Kejžar	Slovenia	2:15.08	q
5	H7 L6	Alice Mills	Australia	2:15.37	q
6	H6 L6	Marianne Limpert	Canada	2:15.50	q
7	H8 L1	Beatrice Câșlaru	Romania	2:15.56	q
8	H7 L4	Hanna Scherba	Belarus	2:15.78	q
9	H6 L7	Ágnes Kovács	Hungary	2:16.31	q
10	H6 L4	Elizabeth Warden	Canada	2:16.35	q
11	H6 L3	Kirsty Coventry	Zimbabwe	2:16.52	q
12	H7 L5	Hui Qi	China	2:16.76	q
13	H8 L5	Gabrielle Rose	United States	2:16.83	q
14	H7 L7	Tatiana Rouba	Spain	2:16.85	q
15	H7 L8	Sara Parise	Italy	2:17.00	q
16	H8 L7	Maiko Fujino	Japan	2:17.03	q
17	H6 L2	Diana Remenyi	Hungary	2:17.20	
18	H5 L4	Aleksandra Urbanczyk	Poland	2:17.28	
19	H7 L2	Nicole Hetzer	Germany	2:17.30	
20	H8 L2	Julie Hjorth-Hansen	Denmark	2:17.34	
21	H8 L8	Paula Carballido	Spain	2:17.50	
22	H5 L7	Helen Norfolk	New Zealand	2:17.79	
23	H8 L3	Leisel Jones	Australia	2:17.95	
24	H4 L4	Joanna Maranhão	Brazil	2:18.56	
25	H5 L5	Yana Tolkatcheva	Russia	2:18.74	
26	H5 L6	Georgina Bardach	Argentina	2:18.76	
27	H6 L8	Veronica Massari	Italy	2:19.04	
28	H5 L8	Aikaterini Sarakatsani	Greece	2:19.84	
29	H4 L6	Petra Banović	Croatia	2:20.08	
30	H7 L1	Elizabeth Van Welie	New Zealand	2:20.13	
31	H4 L2	Lára Hrund Bjargardóttir	Iceland	2:20.35	
32	H5 L3	Mirna Jukić	Austria	2:20.36	
33	H1 L3	Malin Svahnström	Sweden	2:20.57	
34	H4 L5	Elisabeth Jarland	Norway	2:20.83	
35	H4 L3	Yana Martynova	Russia	2:22.48	
36	H5 L2	Yi Ting Siow	Malaysia	2:25.82	
37	H4 L8	Valeria Silva	Peru	2:26.61	
38	H4 L1	Sabria Dahane	Algeria	2:27.27	
39	H3 L1	Katerine Moreno	Bolivia	2:29.85	
40	H3 L3	Khadija Ciss	Senegal	2:30.28	
41	H3 L5	Richa Mishra	India	2:30.99	
42	H3 L2	Jamie Shufflebarger	Virgin Islands	2:31.14	
43	H3 L6	Magdalena Sutanto	Indonesia	2:31.92	
44	H4 L7	Shrone Austin	Seychelles	2:32.42	
45	H3 L7	Ayeisha Collymore	Trinidad and Tobago	2:32.61	
46	H3 L8	Angela Galea	Malta	2:33.32	
47	H3 L4	Sivranjani Vaidyanathan	India	2:33.61	
48	H2 L4	Susan Anchia	Costa Rica	2:35.03	
49	H2 L5	Ana Galindo	Honduras	2:39.70	
50	H2 L3	Roshendra Vrolijk	Aruba	2:40.46	
51	H2 L7	Liana Ramerison Rabenja	Madagascar	2:44.29	
52	H1 L4	Kiran Khan	Pakistan	2:44.47	
53	H1 L5	Jakie Wellman	Zambia	2:44.99	
-	H2 L2	Tojohanitra Andriamanjatoarimanana	Madagascar	DQ	
-	H5 L1	Inbal Levavi	Israel	DQ	
-	-	Joscelin Yeo	Singapore	DNS	
-	-	Genevieve Meledje Lasm Quissoh	Ivory Coast	DNS	
-	-	Éliane Droubry	Ivory Coast	DNS	
