= Martha Matsa =

Greek swimmer

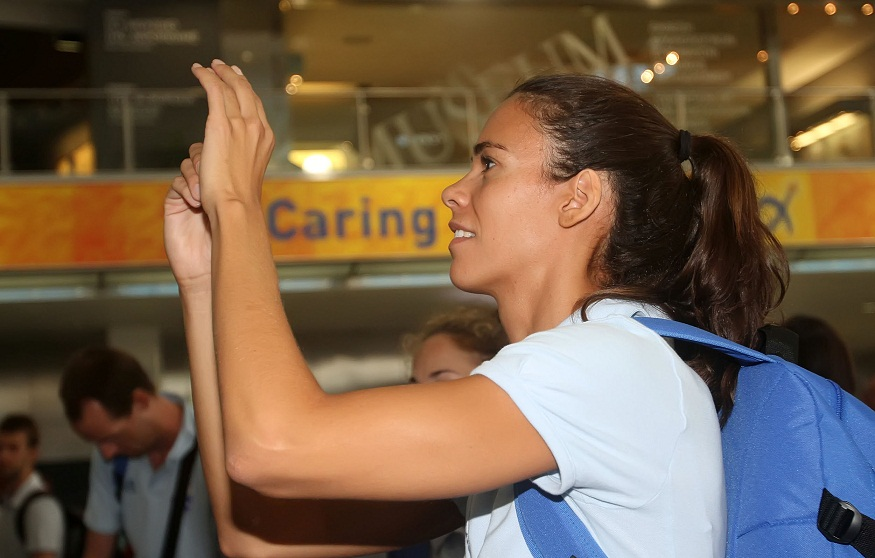

Personal information
- Full name: Martha Matsa
- National team: Greece
- Born: 5 April 1987 (age 39) Thessaloniki, Greece
- Height: 1.84 m (6 ft 0 in)
- Weight: 70 kg (154 lb)

Sport
- Sport: Swimming
- Strokes: Freestyle
- Club: HAN Thessaloniki

Martha Matsa (Greek: Μάρθα Μάτσα; born April 5, 1987) is a Greek swimmer, who specialized in sprint freestyle events. She is a two-time Olympian (2004 and 2008), and a member of the swimming team for HAN Thessaloniki.

When her nation Greece hosted the 2004 Summer Olympics in Athens, Matsa made her Olympic debut as a 17-year-old, competing in two swimming events. She posted a FINA B-standard of 25.61 (50 m freestyle) from an Olympic test event at the Athens Olympic Aquatic Centre. On the first day of the Games, Matsa teamed up with Nery Mantey Niangkouara, Eleni Kosti, and Zoi Dimoschaki in the 4 × 100 m freestyle relay. She held liable for an early relay takeoff, when the Greeks had been disqualified from the heats. Nearly a week later, in the 50 m freestyle, Matsa placed thirty-third on the morning prelims. Swimming in heat seven, she edged out Trinidad and Tobago's Sharntelle McLean to pick up a seventh spot by four-tenths of a second (0.40) in 26.46.

Matsa swam only in the 50 m freestyle at the 2008 Summer Olympics in Beijing. She achieved a FINA B-standard of 25.67 from the Greece National Open Championships in Tripoli. She challenged seven other swimmers in heat nine, including Slovakia's top favorite and five-time Olympian Martina Moravcová. She raced again to seventh place in 25.68, just a slimmest margin off her entry time, and 0.03 of a second behind Ukraine's Oksana Serikova. Matsa failed to advance into the semifinals, as she matched her overall position from Athens in the prelims.

Matsa was also selected as a reserve for the Greek squad at the 2012 Summer Olympics in London, but did not compete in the 4 × 100 m freestyle relay. Her Greek teammates Niangkouara, Theodora Drakou, Theodora Giareni, and teen sensation Kristel Vourna failed to reach the top 8 final, finishing only in sixteenth place with a time of 3:45.55.
