= Georgia Manoli =

Greek swimmer (born 1983)

Personal information
- Full name: Georgia Manoli
- National team: Greece
- Born: 23 April 1983 (age 43) Athens, Greece
- Height: 1.73 m (5 ft 8 in)
- Weight: 63 kg (139 lb)

Sport
- Sport: Swimming
- Strokes: Freestyle
- Club: Olympiakos Athina

Georgia Manoli (Greek: Γεωργία Μανώλη; born April 23, 1983) is a Greek former swimmer, who specialized in freestyle events. She is a single-time Olympian (2004), and a member of Olympiakos Athina. Manoli qualified for the women's 4 × 200 m freestyle relay, as a member of the host nation's team, at the 2004 Summer Olympics in Athens. Teaming with Zoi Dimoschaki, Marianna Lymperta, and Evangelia Tsagka in heat one, Manoli posted a split of 2:05.66 to anchor the last 50 metres of the race. She and her fellow Greeks rounded out an eight-team field to last place and fifteenth overall in a final time of 8:16.69.
