= Swimming at the 2003 World Aquatics Championships – Women's 4 × 100 metre medley relay =

Women's 4x100m Medley Relay at the 2003 FINA World Aquatics Championships
- Dates: 26 July 2003 (prelims & finals)

Medalists
gold medal	China
silver medal	USA
bronze medal	Australia

The Women's 4x100m Medley Relay event at the 10th FINA World Aquatics Championships swam 26 July 2003 in Barcelona, Spain. Preliminary heats swam in the morning session, with the top-8 finishers advancing to swim again in the Final that evening.

At the start of the event, the World (WR) and Championship (CR) records were:

- WR: 3:58.30 swum by the USA on September 23, 2000 in Sydney, Australia.
- CR: 4:01.50 swum by Australia on July 29, 2001 in Fukuoka, Japan.

== Results ==
=== Final ===
Rank	Nation	Swimmers	Time	Notes
1	China	Shu Zhan, Xuejuan Luo, Yafei Zhou, Yu Yang	3:59.89	CR
2	USA	Natalie Coughlin, Amanda Beard, Jenny Thompson, Lindsay Benko	4:00.83	
3	Australia	Giaan Rooney, Leisel Jones, Jessicah Schipper, Jodie Henry	4:01.37	
4	Germany	Antje Buschschulte, Sarah Poewe, Annika Mehlhorn, Sandra Völker	4:02.01	
5	Japan	Mai Nakamura, Masami Tanaka, Yuko Nakanishi, Tomoko Nagai	4:06.25	
6	Netherlands	Hinkelien Schreuder, Madelon Baans, Chantal Groot, Marleen Veldhuis	4:07.73	
7	Sweden	Susannah Moonan, Emma Igelström, Johanna Sjöberg, Josefin Lillhage	4:08.39	
8	Great Britain	Katy Sexton, Jaime King, Alexandra Savage, Karen Legg	4:10.69	

=== Preliminaries ===
Rank	Heat/Lane	Nation	Swimmers	Time	Notes
1	H1 L4	United States	Haley Cope, Tara Kirk; Mary DeScenza, Lindsay Benko	4:04.06	q
2	H3 L5	Germany	Antje Buschschulte, Vipa Bernhardt; Annika Mehlhorn, Petra Dallmann	4:04.58	q
3	H3 L4	China	Shu Zhan, Xuejuan Luo; Yafei Zhou, Yu Yang	4:04.95	q
4	H2 L4	Australia	Giaan Rooney, Leisel Jones; Jessicah Schipper, Jodie Henry	4:05.31	q
5	H3 L2	Netherlands	Hinkelien Schreuder, Madelon Baans; Chantal Groot, Marleen Veldhuis	4:06.32	q
6	H2 L3	Japan	Reiko Nakamura, Masami Tanaka; Yuko Nakanishi, Tomoko Nagai	4:06.38	q
7	H2 L5	Great Britain	Melanie Marshall, Jaime King; Georgina Lee, Karen Legg	4:06.99	q
8	H3 L6	Sweden	Susannah Moonan, Emma Igelström; Johanna Sjöberg, Josefin Lillhage	4:07.82	q
9	H1 L3	Ukraine	Iryna Amshennikova, Yuliya Pidslina; Nataliya Khudyakova, Olga Mukomol	4:10.29	
10	H1 L6	Italy	Alessandra Cappa, Sara Farina; Francesca Segat, Cristina Chiuso	4:10.41	
11	H1 L5	South Africa	Melissa Corfe, Ingrid Haiden; Mandy Loots, Lauren Roets	4:11.95	
12	H2 L2	Switzerland	Dominique Diezi, Ramona Pedretti; Nicole Zahnd, Marjorie Sagne	4:16.87	
13	H1 L2	Hong Kong	Sherry Tsai, Ka Lei Liu; Hang Yu Sze, Jennifer Ng	4:21.01	
14	H2 L7	Brazil	Talita Ribeiro, Patrícia Comini; Ivi Monteiro, Flávia Delaroli	4:21.87	
15	H1 L7	Iceland	Anja Rikey Jakobsdottir, Íris Edda Heimisdóttir; Kolbrún Ýr Kristjánsdóttir, Lára Hrund Bjargardóttir	4:23.02	
16	H3 L1	India	Shikha Tandon, Sivranjani Vaidyanathan; Richa Mishra, Ambica Iyengar	4:47.73	
-	H3 L3	Canada	Erin Gammel, Rhiannon Leier; Jen Button, Laura Nicholls	DQ	
-	H3 L7	Greece	Eirini Karastergiou, Aikaterini Sarakatsani; Zampia Melachroinou, Nery-Mantey Niangkouara	DQ	
-	-	Russia	-	DNS	
