= Eleni Kosti =

Greek swimmer (born 1985)

Personal information
- Full name: Eleni Kosti
- National team: Greece
- Born: 6 November 1985 (age 40) Lamia, Greece
- Height: 1.75 m (5 ft 9 in)
- Weight: 65 kg (143 lb)

Sport
- Sport: Swimming
- Strokes: Freestyle
- Club: Olympiakos Athina
- Coach: Markos Mantaloufas
Medal record
Women's swimming
Representing Greece
Mediterranean Games
Bronze medal – third place	2005 Almería	4×100 m freestyle

Eleni Kosti (Greek: Ελένη Κωστή; born November 6, 1985) is a Greek former swimmer, who specialized in freestyle events. She represented her nation Greece in two editions of the Olympic Games (2004 and 2008), and also won a bronze medal as part of the freestyle relay team at the 2005 Mediterranean Games in Almería, Spain. Kosti trained throughout her swimming career for Olympiakos sports league in Athens under the tutelage of her coach Markos Mantaloufas.

Kosti made her Olympic debut as part of the relay team in the women's 4 × 100 m freestyle with Zoi Dimoschaki, Martha Matsa and favorite Nery Mantey Niangkouara, when Greece hosted the historic modern Games for the second time in Athens. She swam the anchor leg on the outside lane in heat two, but her team was disqualified due to an early relay takeoff by Matsa.

In 2005, Kosti helped her Greek teammates Dimoschaki and 2000 Olympians Aikaterini Bliamou and Zampia Melachroinou atone from their Olympic disqualification in Athens to relish for a bronze-medal victory with a 400-metre freestyle relay final time of 3:49.70 at the Mediterranean Games in Almería, Spain.

On her second Olympics in Beijing 2008, Kosti swam the individual freestyle double with only two days in between. Leading up to the Games, she cleared FINA B-standard entry times of 56.30 (100 m freestyle) at Nioveia Grand Prix in Thessaloniki, and topped the field with 2:00.97 (200 m freestyle) at the Greek national trials in Athens. On the third night of the competition, she closed out the field to last place and forty-fourth overall in heat three of the 200 m freestyle, finishing with a time of 2:04.55. Two days later, in the 100 m freestyle, Kosti escaped from the bottom of the field to finish heat three in seventh position and thirty-seventh overall with a time of 56.44, edging out Slovenia's Nina Sovinek by almost a full second.
