= Javier Núñez =

Javier Núñez may refer to:

- Javier Núñez (Spanish swimmer) (born 1983), Spanish butterfly and medley swimmer
- Javier Núñez (Dominican Republic swimmer) (born 2007), Dominican freestyle and medley swimmer
