= Sara Goffi =

Italian swimmer

Personal information
- Born: July 25, 1981 (age 44)

Sport
- Sport: Swimming
Medal record
Representing Italy
Mediterranean Games
Bronze medal – third place	2001 Tunis	4x200m freestyle relay
European Championships
Silver medal – second place	2000 Helsinki	4x200m freestyle relay

Sara Goffi (born 25 July 1981) is an Italian former freestyle swimmer who competed in the 2000 Summer Olympics.
