= Clara Porchetto =

Italian synchronized swimmer

Personal information
- Born: 29 December 1978 (age 47) Savona, Italy

Sport
- Sport: Synchronised swimming
Medal record
Representing Italy
European Championships
Silver medal – second place	2000 Helsinki	Team
Bronze medal – third place	1997 Seville	Team
Bronze medal – third place	1999 Istanbul	Team

Clara Porchetto (born 29 December 1978) is an Italian former synchronized swimmer who competed in the 2000 Summer Olympics.
