= Evangelia Tsagka =

Greek swimmer (born 1987)

Personal information
- Full name: Evangelia Tsagka
- National team: Greece
- Born: 30 June 1987 (age 39) Athens, Greece
- Height: 1.84 m (6 ft 0 in)
- Weight: 65 kg (143 lb)

Sport
- Sport: Swimming
- Strokes: Freestyle
- Club: Nireas Chalandriou
Medal record
Women's swimming
Representing Greece
Mediterranean Games
| Silver medal – second place | 2001 Tunis | 4×200 m freestyle |

Evangelia Tsagka (Greek: Ευαγγελία Τσάγκα; born June 30, 1987) is a Greek former swimmer who specialized in freestyle events. She is a single-time Olympian (2004), and a silver medalist in the freestyle relay at the 2001 Mediterranean Games in Tunis, Tunisia (8:16.14).

Tsagka qualified for the women's 4 × 200 m freestyle relay, as a member of the host nation's team, at the 2004 Summer Olympics in Athens. Teaming with Zoi Dimoschaki, Marianna Lymperta, and Georgia Manoli in heat one, Tsagka swam a third leg and recorded a split of 2:05.99. She and her fellow Greeks rounded out an eight-team field to last place and fifteenth overall in a final time of 8:16.69.
