= Ivan Mladina =

Croatian swimmer (born 1980)

Personal information
- Born: July 20, 1980 (age 45) Split, Yugoslavia

Sport
- Sport: Swimming
Medal record
Representing Croatia
Mediterranean Games
Silver medal – second place	2001 Tunis	4x100m medley relay
Bronze medal – third place	2001 Tunis	4x100m freestyle relay

Ivan Mladina (born July 20, 1980, in Split) is a freestyle swimmer from Croatia. Mladina made his Olympic debut for his native country at the 2000 Summer Olympics in Sydney, Australia. There he was eliminated in the qualifying heats of the Men's 100 m Butterfly, as well as in the 4 × 100 m Freestyle Relay. Four years later, when Athens, Greece hosted the Summer Olympics, Malina was once again a member of the Croatian swimming team, alongside Duje Draganja, Mario Delač and Igor Čerenšek, that did not pass the heats in the 4 × 100 m Freestyle Relay. Nowadays he is a captain of cruise ship for Carnival.
