= Igor Čerenšek =

Croatian swimmer (born 1983)

Personal information
- Born: April 22, 1983 (age 43) Zagreb, Yugoslavia

Sport
- Sport: Swimming
Medal record
Representing Croatia
Mediterranean Games
Bronze medal – third place	2001 Tunis	4x100m freestyle relay

Igor Čerenšek (born April 22, 1983) is a freestyle swimmer from Croatia, who made his Olympic debut for his native country at the 2004 Summer Olympics in Athens, Greece. There he was eliminated in the qualifying heats (13th place) of the Men's 4 × 100 m Freestyle Relay, alongside Duje Draganja, Mario Delač and Ivan Mladina. He is a 2007 graduate of the University of Minnesota.
