= Lovrenco Franičević =

Croatian swimmer (born 1978)

Personal information
- Born: January 8, 1978 (age 48) Split, Yugoslavia

Sport
- Sport: Swimming
Medal record
Representing Croatia
Mediterranean Games
Bronze medal – third place	2001 Tunis	4x100m freestyle relay

Lovrenco Franičević (born January 8, 1978, in Split) is a former butterfly swimmer from Croatia, who competed for his native country at the Sydney Olympics in 2000. There he was eliminated in the heats of the Men's 200 m Butterfly, with a time of 02:04.35.
