= Johann Le Bihan =

French swimmer

Personal information
- Born: 10 March 1979 (age 47) Douarnenez, France
- Height: 181 cm (5 ft 11 in)
- Weight: 75 kg (165 lb)

Sport
- Sport: Swimming
Medal record
Men's swimming
Representing France
European Championships (LC)
Bronze medal – third place	2000 Helsinki	400 m medley

Johann Le Bihan (born 10 March 1979) is a retired medley swimmer from France, who represented his native country at the 2000 Summer Olympics. He won the bronze medal at the 2000 European Long Course Championships in the men's 400 m individual medley event.
