= Hugo Viart =

French swimmer

Personal information
- Born: 25 December 1979 (age 46) La Roche-sur-Yon, France
- Height: 191 cm (6 ft 3 in)
- Weight: 87 kg (192 lb)

Sport
- Sport: Swimming
Medal record
Men's swimming
Representing France
European Championships (LC)
Bronze medal – third place	2000 Helsinki	4×100 m freestyle relay
Mediterranean Games
Silver medal – second place	2001 Tunis	4x100m freestyle relay
Bronze medal – third place	2001 Tunis	4x200m freestyle relay

Hugo Viart (born 25 December 1979) is a retired freestyle swimmer from France, who represented his native country at the 2000 Summer Olympics. He won the bronze medal at the 2000 European Long Course Championships in the men's 4 × 100 m freestyle relay event.
