= Raluca Udroiu =

Romanian swimmer

Medal record

Representing Romania

Women's swimming

European LC Championships
Bronze medal – third place	Helsinki 2000	4×100 m medley

Raluca Antonia Udroiu (born 12 May 1982 in Baia Mare, Maramureş, Romania) is an international backstroke swimmer from Romania, who represented her native country at the 2000 Summer Olympics in Sydney, Australia. Prior to that tournament, at the 2000 European Aquatics Championships in Helsinki, Finland, she was on the women's relay team, that won the bronze medal in the 4×100 m freestyle.
