= Zampia Melachroinou =

Greek swimmer (born 1979)

Personal information
- Full name: Zampia Melachroinou
- National team: Greece
- Born: 28 January 1979 (age 47) Piraeus, Greece
- Height: 1.72 m (5 ft 7 1/2 in)
- Weight: 63 kg (139 lb)

Sport
- Sport: Swimming
- Strokes: Freestyle, butterfly
- Club: Aris Nikaias
- Coach: Antonis Pitidis
Medal record
Women's swimming
Representing Greece
Mediterranean Games
Silver medal – second place	2001 Tunis	4×100 m freestyle
Silver medal – second place	2001 Tunis	4×200 m freestyle
Bronze medal – third place	2005 Almería	4×100 m freestyle

Zampia Melachroinou (Greek: Ζαμπία Μελαχροινού; born 28 January 1979) is a Greek former swimmer, who specialized in freestyle and butterfly events. She represented Greece at the 2000 Summer Olympics, and later collected a total of three medals (two silvers and one bronze) at the Mediterranean Games (2001 and 2005). During her sporting career, Melachroinou trained for Aris Nikaias Swim Club under head coach Antonis Pitidis.

Melachroinou competed for the Greek squad in a butterfly double at the 2000 Summer Olympics in Sydney. She achieved FINA B-standards of 1:01.50 (100 m butterfly) and 2:15.24 (200 m butterfly) from the European Championships in Helsinki, Finland. On the first day of the Games, Melachroinou placed thirty-fourth in the 100 m butterfly. Swimming in heat three, she edged out South Korea's Lee Bo-eun on the final stretch to grab a second seed by 16-hundredths of a second in 1:02.06. Three days later, in the 200 m butterfly, Melachroinou posted a seventh-seeded time of 2:17.60 to hold off a sprint challenge from Singapore's Christel Bouvron by a small fraction of a second in heat two, but finished farther from the semifinal field with a thirty-first-place effort.

At the 2001 Mediterranean Games in Tunis, Tunisia, Melachroinou helped the Greeks captured two silver medals each in the 4 × 100 m freestyle relay (3:48.74) and in the 4 × 200 m freestyle relay (8:16.14). On that same year, at the European Short Course Championships in Antwerp, Belgium, Melachroinou, along with Aikaterini Sarakatsani, Nery Mantey Niangkouara, and Zoi Dimoschaki, finished eighth in the 4×50 m freestyle relay with a time of 1:44.88.

Four years later, at the 2005 Mediterranean Games in Almería, Spain, Melachroinou shared bronze medals with Dimoschaki, Eleni Kosti, and Aikaterini Bliamou in the 4 × 100 m freestyle relay with a time of 3:49.70.
