= Annabel Kosten =

Dutch swimmer (born 1977)

Personal information
- Full name: Annabel Kosten
- Nationality: Dutch
- Born: 23 May 1977 (age 49) Oostburg, Zeeland
- Height: 1.80 m (5 ft 11 in)
- Weight: 70 kg (154 lb)

Sport
- Sport: Swimming
- Strokes: Freestyle
Medal record
Women's swimming
Representing the Netherlands
Olympic Games
Bronze medal – third place	2004 Athens	4×100 m freestyle
European Championships (LC)
Silver medal – second place	2004 Madrid	4×100 m freestyle
European Championships (SC)
Gold medal – first place	2003 Dublin	4×50 m freestyle
Silver medal – second place	2001 Antwerp	4×50 m freestyle

Annabel Kosten (born 23 May 1977) is a retired freestyle swimmer from the Netherlands, who won the bronze medal with the Dutch women's 4×100 m freestyle relay team at the 2004 Summer Olympics in Athens, Greece.

== Career ==
Kosten made her international debut at the European LC Championships 2000 in Helsinki, Finland where she ended fifth in the 4×100 meter freestyle relay, she did so alongside Thamar Henneken, Chantal Groot and Wilma van Hofwegen. At the European Short Course Swimming Championships 2001 in Antwerp, Belgium she won the silver medal in the 4×50 meter freestyle, together with Suze Valen, Hinkelien Schreuder and Inge de Bruijn. She ended fourth in 4×50 meter freestyle at the European Short Course Swimming Championships 2002 in Riesa, Germany alongside Marleen Veldhuis, Suze Valen and Chantal Groot.

=== 2003-2005 ===
At the 2003 World Aquatics Championships in Barcelona, Spain Kosten teamed up with Manon van Rooijen, Marleen Veldhuis and Chantal Groot for the 4×100 meter freestyle relay, in which they reached the fourth position. She became European champion in the 4×50 meter freestyle relay at the European Short Course Swimming Championships 2003 in Dublin, Ireland together with Hinkelien Schreuder, Chantal Groot and Marleen Veldhuis. At the European LC Championships 2004 in Madrid, Spain she took home the silver of the 4×100 meter freestyle relay, her teammates were Chantal Groot, Inge Dekker and Marleen Veldhuis. At the 2004 Summer Olympics in Athens, Greece Kosten swam in the heats of the 4×100 meter freestyle relay alongside Inge Dekker, Marleen Veldhuis and Chantal Groot. In the final she was replaced by Inge de Bruijn, who won the bronze medal together with the three other girls, afterwards Kosten received the bronze medal for her heat swim. After the national championships in April 2005 Kosten retired from competitive swimming.

== Personal bests ==
Short course
Event	Time	Date	Location
50 m freestyle	25.22	2003-12-14	Dublin, Ireland
100 m freestyle	55.13	2003-12-11	Dublin, Ireland

Long course
Event	Time	Date	Location
50 m freestyle	25.65	2004	Eindhoven, Netherlands
100 m freestyle	56.04	2004	Amsterdam, Netherlands
