= Zhou Yafei =

Chinese swimmer (born 1984)

Medal record

Women's swimming

Representing China

Olympic Games
Bronze medal – third place	2008 Beijing	4×100 m medley

World Championships (LC)
Gold medal – first place	2003 Barcelona	4×100 m medley
Silver medal – second place	2009 Rome	50 m butterfly
Bronze medal – third place	2003 Barcelona	200 m medley
Bronze medal – third place	2003 Barcelona	4x200 m freestyle
Bronze medal – third place	2005 Montreal	4x200 m freestyle
Bronze medal – third place	2007 Melbourne	4x100 m medley

Zhou Yafei (Chinese: 周雅菲; pinyin: Zhōu Yǎfēi; born 1984-01-17 in Qingdao, Shandong) is a Chinese swimmer, who competed for Team China at the 2008 Summer Olympics.

== Major achievements ==
- 2002 Asian Games - 1st 100m fly/4 × 100 m medley relay;
- 2003 World Championships - 3rd 200m individual medley/1st 4 × 100 m medley relay;
- 2003 World Military Games - 1st 50m fly/100m fly/200m free/4 × 100 m free relay/4 × 100 m medley relay;
- 2004 Olympic Games - 4th 4 × 100 m medley relay;
- 2005 National Games - 1st 100m fly/4 × 100 m medley relay;
- 2005 East Asian Games - 1st 100m fly/4 × 100 m medley relay;
- 2006 World Short-Course Championships - 3rd 4 × 100 m medley relay;
- 2006 Asian Games - 1st 100m fly/4 × 100 m medley relay;
- 2007 World Military Games - 1st 50m fly/100m fly/4 × 100 m free relay/4 × 100 m medley relay;
- 2008 Beijing Olympics - 3rd 4 × 100 m medley relay;
- 2009 World Aquatics Championships - 2nd 50m butterfly

== Records ==
- 2003 World Championships - 26.71, 50m fly (AR);
- 2006 National Championships - 26.30, 50m fly (AR)/58.32 100m fly (AR);
- 2006 National Championships - 2007 World Championships - 58.20, 100m fly (AR)

== Personal life ==
Zhou Yafei married basketball player Mo Ke in 2012.
