= Gabrielle Rose (swimmer) =

Brazilian-American swimmer (born 1977)

Personal information
- Full name: Gabrielle Elaine Franco Rose
- National team: Brazil; United States
- Born: November 1, 1977 (age 48) Memphis, Tennessee, U.S.
- Height: 5 ft 8 in (1.73 m)
- Weight: 139 lb (63 kg)

Sport
- Sport: Swimming
- Strokes: Butterfly, freestyle, individual medley
- Club: Memphis State Swim Club; EC Pinheiros, São Paulo; Irvine Novaquatics (In 2000)
- College team: Stanford University
- Coach: Dick Fadgen (Memphis State SC); Rick Bishop (Brazilian Nat. Team); Skip Kenney (Stanford); Dave Salo (Novaquatics)
Medal record
Women's swimming
Representing the United States
World Championships (LC)
Gold medal – first place	2003 Barcelona	4×100 m freestyle
Gold medal – first place	2003 Barcelona	4×200 m freestyle
World Championships (SC)
Silver medal – second place	2002 Moscow	100 m medley
Silver medal – second place	2002 Moscow	200 m medley
Silver medal – second place	2002 Moscow	4x200 m freestyle
Pan Pacific Championships
Silver medal – second place	2002 Yokohama	200 m medley
Representing Brazil
Pan American Games
Silver medal – second place	1995 Mar del Plata	100 m butterfly
Bronze medal – third place	1995 Mar del Plata	4x100 m freestyle
Bronze medal – third place	1995 Mar del Plata	4x100 m medley

Gabrielle Elaine Franco Rose (born November 1, 1977) is a Brazilian-American competition swimmer who participated in the 1996 Atlanta and 2000 Sydney Olympics. A resident of Memphis, Tennessee, Rose swam for Stanford University, competed for Brazil at the 1995 Pan American Games and 1996 Summer Olympics, but later represented the United States beginning with the 1999 Pan American Games.

== Early life ==
Rose was born November 1, 1977, in Memphis, Tennessee to Michael David Rose and Brazilian-born mother Regina Rose, and held dual U.S. and Brazilian citizenship, though her parents divorced when she was young. Her father Michael had served as the CEO of businesses that included the Promus Company, the Hotel Chain Holiday Inn and Harrah's Entertainment. Michael Rose subsequently married Debbi Fields, founder of food company Mrs. Fields. Gabrielle attended Memphis's St. Mary's Episcopal School, graduating in 1995. She swam and trained with the Memphis State Tiger Swim Club under Coach Dick Fadgen beginning at the age of five, and by twelve was the youngest swimmer in the Seniors group. Her older brother Matthew also swam for the Memphis State Club. As a seventh grade swimmer at 12, Gabrielle set a national age-group record with a time of 1:05.38 at the National Junior Olympics in March 1990. At 14, Rose earned five medals at the National Swim Championships of Brazil. In High School, Gabrielle earned Scholastic All American honors and was a Tennessee Scholar-Athlete of the Year as a Senior. An exceptional student, she graduated St. Mary's with a 4.0 grade point average.

== Stanford University ==
Rose attended Stanford University on an athletic scholarship, where she swam for the Stanford Cardinal swimming and diving team under Hall of Fame Women's Head Coach Skip Kenney. As a Stanford Senior she and Catherine Fox served as swim team co-captains, and Rose had a 200-meter Individual Medley world ranking of 12th with a time of 2:16.06. In all time Stanford Women's records, her 200-yard IM time of 1:58.86 was Stanford's sixth fastest as of 2009. In the 100 freestyle and fly, she had an all-time Stanford seventh-place ranking of 49.49 in the free and 53.78 in the 100 fly. Recognized for her achievements, she received All-American honors 22 times during her collegiate career. She graduated from Stanford in March 2000 with a Bachelor of Arts degree in American Studies, and earned a Master of Business Administration degree in 2009.

While swimming for the Brazilian national team in 1991 in preparation for the 1996 Olympics, she was a member of the EC Pinheiros, São Paulo, Brazil sports club. Rick Bishop, who would later coach swimming at LSU in 2021, was Gabrielle's head coach in 1996 when she swam at the Atlanta Olympics for the Brazilian National team.

== International career ==
=== 1996 Atlanta Olympics ===
Representing Brazil at the 1996 Summer Olympics in Atlanta, Rose finished 14th in the 100-meter butterfly, 22nd in the 200-meter individual medley, and 23rd in the 100-meter freestyle. At the 2000 Summer Olympics in Sydney, Rose finished 7th in the 200-meter individual medley final.

At the 1995 FINA World Swimming Championships (25 m) in Rio de Janeiro, she finished 4th in the 200-meter individual medley, with a time of 2:12.64; 6th in the 4×100-meter medley, with a time of 4:12.76; 6th in the 4×100-meter freestyle, along with Paula Aguiar, Lúcia Santos and Raquel Takaya, breaking the South American record, with a time of 3:45.87; and 8th in the 100-meter butterfly, with a time of 1:00.34, new South American record. In the 100-meter freestyle heats, she broke the South American record, with a time of 56.13 seconds. At the 2002 FINA World Swimming Championships (25 m) in Moscow, Rose won three silver medals in the 100-meter individual medley, 200-meter individual medley, and 4×200-meter freestyle.

At the 1995 Pan American Games in Mar del Plata, Rose won a silver medal in the 100-meter butterfly, and two bronze medals in the 4×100-meter freestyle and medley relays. She also finished 5th in the 100-meter freestyle, and 6th in the 200-meter individual medley. At the 1999 Pan American Games in Winnipeg, she finished 4th in the 200-meter individual medley.

=== 2000 Sydney Olympics ===
Representing the United States in the 2000 Olympics, she placed seventh in the 200 meter Individual Medley, with a time of 2:14.82, placing her 1.5 seconds from contending for the bronze medal. Yana Klochkova of the Ukraine took the gold medal with a time of 2:10.68. Beginning in May, 2000, after her undergraduate swimming career at Stanford, Gabrielle was trained prior to the 2000 Olympic games by Dave Salo, who coached her as part of the Irvine Novaquatics team at Heritage Park. She contacted Salo after he coached her at the U.S. Pan American Games in Winnipeg in the Summer of 1999.

=== 2024 Olympic trials ===
In 2024, at the age of 46 and having last competed in an Olympic Trials in 2004, Rose advanced to the 100-meter breaststroke semifinals at the United States Olympic Trials in Indianapolis, finishing 10th with a personal best time of 1:08.32. Later in the week, she qualified for the semifinals of the 200-meter breaststroke, finishing 14th in the preliminary round. She came into the meet as the 45th seed out of 45 swimmers in the 200-meter breaststroke.

== Brazilian records ==
Rose is a former Brazilian record holder of the 100-meter freestyle, 100-meter butterfly, 100-meter breaststroke and 200-meter individual medley. The 100-meter breaststroke record was eclipsed by Patrícia Comini. Her 200-meter individual medley records were beaten by Joanna Maranhão in long and short pools. Her 100-meter freestyle record was broken by Tatiana Lemos.

=== Post swimming pursuits ===
When Gabrielle's father Michael, a strong supporter of the University of Memphis, died in 2017, he donated funds to establish the Mike Rose Soccer Complex and the Mike Rose Natatorium, which opened in 2023 through the Rose Foundation. In July 2019, as a spokesperson and executive director of the Rose Foundation, Gabrielle advocated the advantages of the new natatorium in bringing business to the Memphis community through swim meets, and the sponsorship of swim training for youth, as well as drowning prevention programs.
