= 2000 European Aquatics Championships =

Water sport competitions

25th European Aquatics Championships
- Host city: Helsinki, Finland
- Date(s): 3–9 July 2000
- Events: 55

The 2000 LEN European Championships were held Monday 3 July to Sunday 9 July 2000 in Helsinki, Finland. Competition was swum in the 50 m, long course pool at the Mäkelänrinne Swimming Center. The 25th edition of the event was organised by the LEN less than three months prior to the Summer Olympics in Sydney, Australia.

The championships included the aquatic disciplines of Swimming (long course), Open Water Swimming, Diving, and Synchronised swimming.

== Medal table ==
Host nation

Rank	Nation	Gold	Silver	Bronze	Total
1	Russia	15	3	4	22
2	Germany	7	12	2	21
3	Italy	6	7	4	17
4	Sweden	6	2	3	11
5	Ukraine	4	3	6	13
6	Spain	4	2	5	11
7	Romania	3	6	5	14
8	Hungary	3	1	0	4
9	France	2	1	6	9
10	Slovakia	1	2	1	4
11	Finland*	1	1	1	3
11	Switzerland	1	1	1	3
13	Belarus	1	1	0	2
13	Poland	1	1	0	2
15	Croatia	1	0	0	1
16	Netherlands	0	5	2	7
17	Great Britain	0	2	6	8
18	Denmark	0	2	2	4
19	Belgium	0	1	2	3
20	Lithuania	0	1	0	1
21	Czech Republic	0	0	2	2
22	Austria	0	0	1	1
22	Israel	0	0	1	1
22	Turkey	0	0	1	1
Totals (24 entries)		56	54	55	165

== Swimming ==
=== Men's events ===
Event	Gold	Silver	Bronze
50 m freestyle	Alexander Popov; Russia	Pieter van den Hoogenband; Netherlands	Lorenzo Vismara; Italy
100 m freestyle	Alexander Popov; Russia	Pieter van den Hoogenband; Netherlands	Lars Frölander; Sweden
200 m freestyle	Massimiliano Rosolino; Italy	Pieter van den Hoogenband; Netherlands	(United Kingdom) Paul Palmer; Great Britain
400 m freestyle	Emiliano Brembilla; Italy	Dragoş Coman; Romania	(United Kingdom) Paul Palmer; Great Britain
1500 m freestyle	Igor Chervynskyi; Ukraine	Emiliano Brembilla; Italy	Dragoş Coman; Romania
50 m backstroke	Stev Theloke; Germany	Darius Grigalionis; Lithuania	David Ortega; Spain
100 m backstroke	David Ortega; Spain	Volodymyr Nikolaychuk; Ukraine	Derya Büyükuncu; Turkey
200 m backstroke	Gordan Kožulj; Croatia	Emanuele Merisi; Italy	Yoav Gath; Israel
50 m breaststroke	Mark Warnecke; Germany	Oleg Lisogor; Ukraine	Remo Lütolf; Switzerland
100 m breaststroke	Domenico Fioravanti; Italy	Jarno Pihlava; Finland	Dmitry Komornikov; Russia
200 m breaststroke	Dmitry Komornikov; Russia	Domenico Fioravanti; Italy	Maxim Podoprigora; Austria
50 m butterfly	Jere Hård; Finland	Lars Frölander; Sweden	(United Kingdom) Mark Foster; Great Britain
100 m butterfly	Lars Frölander; Sweden	Thomas Rupprath; Germany	(United Kingdom) James Hickman; Great Britain
200 m butterfly	Anatoly Polyakov; Russia	(United Kingdom) James Hickman; Great Britain	Ioan Gherghel; Romania
200 m individual medley	Massimiliano Rosolino; Italy	Christian Keller; Germany	Xavier Marchand; France
400 m individual medley	István Batházi; Hungary	Cezar Bădiţă; Romania	Johann Le Bihan; France
4 × 100 m freestyle relay	Russia; Denis Pimankov; Dmitriy Chernychev; Andrey Kapralov; Alexander Popov	Germany; Stefan Herbst; Lars Conrad; Christian Tröger; Stephan Kunzelmann	France; Romain Barnier; Nicolas Kintz; Hugo Viart; Frédérick Bousquet
4 × 200 m freestyle relay	Italy; Massimiliano Rosolino; Matteo Pelliciari; Simone Cercato; Emiliano Brembilla	Germany; Michael Kiedel; Christian Keller; Stefan Herbst; Stefan Pohl	Netherlands; Martijn Zuijdweg; Marcel Wouda; Mark van der Zijden; Pieter van den Hoogenband
4 × 100 m medley relay	Russia; Vladislav Aminov; Dmitry Komornikov; Dmitriy Chernyshev; Alexander Popov	Sweden; Mattias Ohlin; Martin Gustavsson; Lars Frölander; Stefan Nystrand	Ukraine; Volodymyr Nikolaychuk; Oleg Lisogor; Andriy Serdinov; Pavel Khnykin

=== Women's events ===
Event	Gold	Silver	Bronze
50 m freestyle	Therese Alshammar; Sweden	Wilma van Hofwegen; Netherlands	Olga Mukomol; Ukraine
100 m freestyle	Therese Alshammar; Sweden	Martina Moravcová; Slovakia	Mette Jacobsen; Denmark
200 m freestyle	Natalya Baranovskaya; Belarus	Martina Moravcová; Slovakia	Camelia Potec; Romania
400 m freestyle	Yana Klochkova; Ukraine	Natalya Baranovskaya; Belarus	Camelia Potec; Romania
800 m freestyle	Flavia Rigamonti; Switzerland	Chantal Strasser; Switzerland	Kirsten Vlieghuis; Netherlands
50 m backstroke	Nina Zhivanevskaya; Spain	Diana Mocanu; Romania	Ilona Hlaváčková; Czech Republic
100 m backstroke	Nina Zhivanevskaya; Spain	Diana Mocanu; Romania	Louise Ørnstedt; Denmark
200 m backstroke	Nina Zhivanevskaya; Spain	Diana Mocanu; Romania	Antje Buschschulte; Germany
50 m breaststroke	Ágnes Kovács; Hungary	(United Kingdom) Zoë Baker; Great Britain	Sylvia Gerasch; Germany
100 m breaststroke	Ágnes Kovács; Hungary	Sylvia Gerasch; Germany	Svitlana Bondarenko; Ukraine
200 m breaststroke	Beatrice Câșlaru; Romania	Ágnes Kovács; Hungary	Karine Bremond; France
50 m butterfly	Anna-Karin Kammerling; Sweden	Karen Egdal; Denmark	Martina Moravcová; Slovakia
100 m butterfly	Martina Moravcová; Slovakia	Otylia Jędrzejczak; Poland	Johanna Sjöberg; Sweden
200 m butterfly	Otylia Jędrzejczak; Poland	Mette Jacobsen; Denmark	Mireia García; Spain
200 m individual medley	Yana Klochkova; Ukraine Beatrice Câșlaru; Romania	None	(United Kingdom) Sue Rolph; Great Britain
400 m individual medley	Yana Klochkova; Ukraine	Beatrice Câșlaru; Romania	Yseult Gervy; Belgium
4 × 100 m freestyle relay	Sweden; Louise Jöhncke; Johanna Sjöberg; Anna-Karin Kammerling; Therese Alshammar	Italy; Luisa Striani; Sara Parise; Cecilia Vianini; Cristina Chiuso	Belgium; Nina van Koeckhoven; Liesbet Dreesen; Sofie Goffin; Tine Bossuyt
4 × 200 m freestyle relay	Romania; Camelia Potec; Simona Păduraru; Ioana Diaconescu; Beatrice Câșlaru	Italy; Luisa Striani; Cecilia Vianini; Sara Parise; Sara Goffi	France; Solenne Figuès; Laetitia Choux; Katarine Quelennec; Alicia Bozon
4 × 100 m medley relay	Sweden; Therese Alshammar; Emma Igelström; Johanna Sjöberg; Louise Jöhncke	Belgium; Sofie Wolfs; Brigitte Becue; Fabienne Dufour; Nina van Koeckhoven	Romania; Raluca Udroiu; Beatrice Câșlaru; Diana Mocanu; Camelia Potec

== Open water swimming ==
=== Men's events ===
Event	Gold	Silver	Bronze
5 km open water	Luca Baldini (ITA)	Fabio Venturini (ITA)	David Meca (ESP)
25 km open water	Stéphane Lecat (FRA)	David Meca (ESP)	Fabio Fusi (ITA)

=== Women's events ===
Event	Gold	Silver	Bronze
5 km open water	Peggy Büchse (GER)	Britta Kamrau (GER)	Jana Pechanová (CZE)
25 km open water	Peggy Büchse (GER)	Edith van Dijk (NED)	Valeria Casprini (ITA)

== Diving ==
=== Men's events ===
Event	Gold	Silver	Bronze
1 m springboard	Alexander Mesch; Germany	Dmitri Baibakov; Russia	Joona Puhakka; Finland
3 m springboard	Dmitri Sautin; Russia	Stefan Ahrens; Germany	Alexander Dobroskok; Russia
10 m platform	Dmitri Sautin; Russia	Heiko Meyer; Germany	Igor Lukashin; Russia
3 m springboard synchro	Tobias Schellenberg; Andreas Wels; Germany	Alexander Dobroskok; Dmitri Sautin; Russia	Rafael Álvarez; José Miguel Gil; Spain
10 m platform synchro	Igor Lukashin; Dmitri Sautin; Russia	Oleksandr Skrypnyk; Roman Volodkov; Ukraine	(United Kingdom) Leon Taylor; Pete Waterfield; Great Britain

=== Women's events ===
Event	Gold	Silver	Bronze
1 m springboard	Vera Ilyina; Russia	Heike Fischer; Germany	Natalya Umyskova; Russia
3 m springboard	Yuliya Pakhalina; Russia	Dörte Lindner; Germany	Anna Lindberg; Sweden
10 m platform	Svetlana Timoshinina; Russia	Ute Wetzig; Germany	Olena Zhupina; Ukraine
3 m springboard synchro	Vera Ilyina; Yuliya Pakhalina; Russia	Dörte Lindner; Conny Schmalfuß; Germany	Ganna Sorokina; Olena Zhupina; Ukraine
10 m platform synchro	Anke Piper; Ute Wetzig; Germany	Yevgeniya Olshevskaya; Svetlana Timoshinina; Russia	Olha Leonova; Olena Zhupina; Ukraine

== Synchronized swimming ==
Event	Gold	Silver	Bronze
Solo	Olga Brusnikina; Russia	Virginie Dedieu; France	Gemma Mengual; Spain
Duet	Virginie Dedieu; Myriam Lignot; France	Gemma Mengual; Paola Tirados; Spain	Maurizia Cecconi; Alessia Lucchini; Italy
Team	Russia; Elena Azarova; Olga Brusnikina; Mariya Kiselyova; Olga Novokshchenova; Irina Pershina; Elena Soya; Yuliya Vasilyeva; Olga Vasyukova	Italy; Giada Ballan; Serena Bianchi; Mara Brunetti; Giovanna Burlando; Chiara Cassin; Maurizia Cecconi; Alessia Lucchini; Clara Porchetto	France; Cinthia Bouhier; Virginie Dedieu; Charlotte Fabre; Myriam Glez; Rachel le Bozec; Myriam Lignot; Charlotte Massardier; Magali Rathier
