= Maritza Correia =

Puerto Rican swimmer, Olympic silver medalist, former world record-breaker

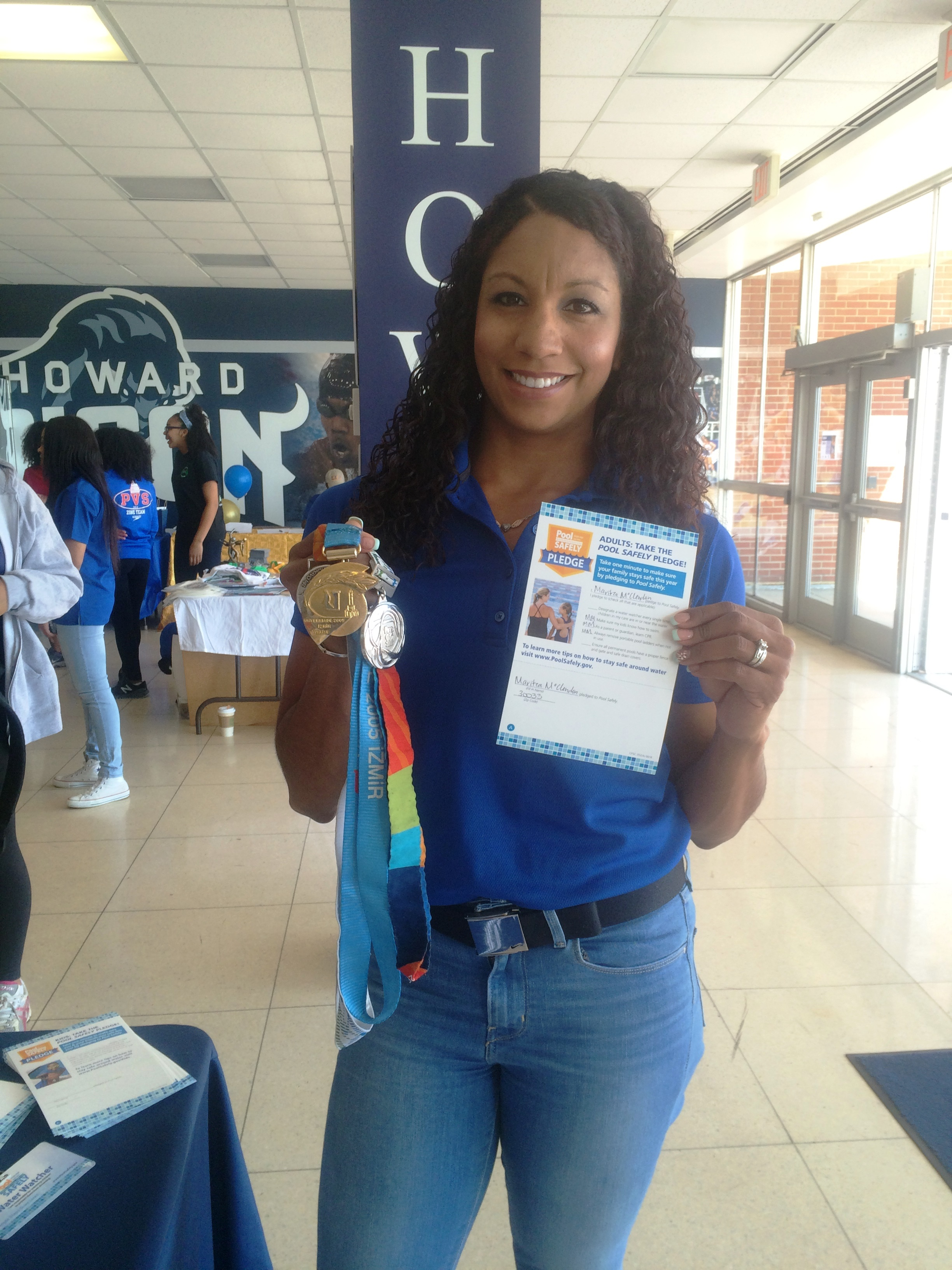
- Correia in 2016

Personal information
- Nickname: "Ritz"
- National team: United States
- Born: December 23, 1981 (age 44) San Juan, Puerto Rico
- Height: 5 ft 9 in (1.75 m)
- Weight: 134 lb (61 kg)
- Website: www.maritzamcclendon.com

Sport
- Sport: Swimming
- Strokes: Freestyle
- Club: Brandon Blue Wave
- College team: University of Georgia
Medal record
Women's swimming
Representing the United States
Olympic Games
| Silver medal – second place | 2004 Athens | 4x100 m freestyle |
World Championships (LC)
| Gold medal – first place | 2003 Barcelona | 4×100 m freestyle |
| Silver medal – second place | 2001 Fukuoka | 4×100 m freestyle |
World Championships (SC)
| Silver medal – second place | 2006 Shanghai | 4x100 m medley |
| Bronze medal – third place | 2006 Shanghai | 100 m freestyle |
Pan American Games
| Gold medal – first place | 2007 Rio de Janeiro | 4x100 m freestyle |
| Gold medal – first place | 2007 Rio de Janeiro | 4x100 m medley |
Summer Universiade
| Gold medal – first place | 2005 İzmir | 50 m freestyle |
| Gold medal – first place | 2005 İzmir | 4x100 m freestyle |
| Gold medal – first place | 2005 İzmir | 4x100 m medley |

Maritza Correia (born December 23, 1981), also known by her married name Maritza McClendon, is a former Olympic swimmer from Puerto Rico who swam representing the United States. When she qualified for the U.S. Olympic team in 2004, she became the first Puerto Rican of African descent to be a member of the U.S. Olympic swimming team. She was the first female African-American swimmer for the United States to win an Olympic medal. She also became the first black American swimmer to set an American and world swimming record.

== Early years ==
Correia was born and raised in San Juan, Puerto Rico. Her parents, Vincent and Anne, had moved there from Guyana. In 1988, when Correia was seven years old, she was diagnosed with severe scoliosis. Her doctor recommended that she take swimming classes and use swimming as a treatment for her condition. In 1990, her family moved and settled in Tampa, Florida.

Correia attended Tampa Bay Technical High School and joined the school's swimming team. In 1999, she became the 50-meter freestyle U.S. national champion in the 18-and-under category. She was also a six-time Florida high school state champion in five different events. Correia was a member of the 1997 USA national junior team that competed in Sweden and the 1999 USA Short Course World Championships team that competed in Hong Kong.

In 1999, Correia joined the University of Georgia Lady Bulldogs swimming and diving team. She aided the team when they won their title in the 400 m freestyle relay. She earned a share of the SEC Commissioner's Trophy for high-point honors. Correia was the first swimmer in Southeastern Conference history to win an SEC title in all freestyle events. During her college career she was a 27-time All-American, and 11-time NCAA champion.

== National Champion, Olympics, Universiade ==
=== 2000 US Olympic Trials ===
Correia hoped to participate at the 2000 Summer Olympics in Sydney. She competed at the Olympic trials, but she failed to make the team.

=== 2001 World Championships ===
In 2001, Correia won a gold medal in the 800-meter freestyle and two bronze medals in the medley and 400-meter freestyle relay as a member of the U.S. team at the 2001 World Championships in Japan.

=== 2002 NCAA Championships ===
In 2002, Correia became the national champion in both the 50-yard and 100-yard freestyle and was a member of two winning relay teams at the NCAA Championships in Austin, Texas. She set the NCAA, American, and U.S. Open records with a time of 21.69 in the 50-yard freestyle, surpassing Amy Van Dyken's mark of 21.77 set in 1994. She earned twenty-seven All-American certificates and was awarded the Commissioner's Cup as the high point scorer in the SEC Championships.

=== 2003 World Championships ===
In July 2003, Correia earned a gold medal swimming in a preliminary heat of the 4 × 100-meter freestyle relay at the World Aquatics Championships in Barcelona, Spain.

=== 2004 ===
==== 2004 Summer Olympics ====
2004 Summer Olympics
| Silver medal – second place | 4x100 m freestyle relay | 3:36.39 |

She earned an Olympic silver medal swimming the prelims of the 4 × 100-meter freestyle relay at the 2004 Summer Olympics in Athens, Greece in August 2004. Correia became the first female African-American swimmer to win an Olympic medal for the United States.

==== 2004 World Championships ====
In October 2004, she won a gold medal swimming the prelims of the 4 × 100-meter freestyle relay at the Short Course World Championships in Indianapolis.

=== 2005 ===
Correia attended the University of Georgia as a sociology major and graduated in 2005.

==== 2005 Summer Universiade ====
In 2005, she won three gold medals at the 2005 Summer Universiade in İzmir, Turkey.

== After swimming ==
In March 2010, Maritza married Chad McClendon, and on January 1, 2012, their son Kason was born. On September 25, 2013, the family added a daughter, Sanaya Anne. McClendon is a member of Sigma Gamma Rho sorority.

== Highlights ==
- 2004 Olympic silver medalist: 4 × 100 freestyle relay
- First African American female to make the U.S. Olympic swim team
- 2000 NCAA champion: 200-meter freestyle, 400-meter freestyle relay, 400-meter medley relay
- 2001 NCAA champion: 800-yard freestyle relay
- 2002 NCAA champion: 50-yard freestyle, 100-yard freestyle, 200-yard freestyle relay, 400-yard freestyle relay
- 2003 NCAA champion: 50-yard freestyle, 100-yard freestyle
- 2000-03 27-time All-American
- World record-holder in the 400-yard medley relay SCM at 2000 NCAA Championships
- American, NCAA, U.S. Open record holder: 50-yard freestyle (21.69) in 2002
- American, NCAA, U.S. Open record Holder: 200-yard freestyle relay (1:28.74) in 2002
- American, NCAA, U.S. Open record holder: 400-yard freestyle relay (3:13.71) in 2002
- 2001, 2003 two-time world champion in 4 × 100 m freestyle relay
- 2005 World University Games gold medalist: 50-meter freestyle, 4 × 100-meter freestyle relay, 4 × 100-meter medley relay, 4 × 200-meter freestyle relay
- 2006 World Championships silver medalist: 100-meter freestyle
- 2007 Pan American Games champion: 4 × 100-meter freestyle relay, 4 × 100-meter medley relay

== See also ==
- List of Puerto Ricans
- List of Guyanese Americans
- List of Olympic medalists in swimming (women)
- List of University of Georgia people
- List of World Aquatics Championships medalists in swimming (women)
- Pan American Games records in swimming
- World record progression 4 × 100 metres medley relay
