= Javier Núñez (Spanish swimmer) =

Spanish swimmer (born 1983)

Personal information
- Full name: Javier Núñez Molano
- Nationality: Spanish
- Born: 27 January 1983 (age 43) Sabadell, Barcelona, Spain

Sport
- Sport: Swimming
Medal record
Representing Spain
Mediterranean Games
Bronze medal – third place	2001 Tunis	1500m freestyle

Javier Núñez Molano (Note: In this Spanish name, the first or paternal surname is Núñez and the second or maternal family name is Molano.) (born 23 April 1983) is a Spanish butterfly and medley swimmer who competed in the 2008 Summer Olympics. He was born in Sabadell, Barcelona.
