= Thanasis Oikonomou =

Greek swimmer

Personal information
- Born: 2 April 1978 (age 48)

Sport
- Sport: Swimming
Medal record
Representing Greece
European Championships
Bronze medal – third place	2002 Berlin	4x200m freestyle relay
Mediterranean Games
Gold medal – first place	2001 Tunis	4x200m freestyle relay
Bronze medal – third place	2001 Tunis	200m freestyle
Bronze medal – third place	2001 Tunis	400m freestyle

Thanasis Oikonomou (Greek: Θανάσης Οικονόμου; born 2 April 1978) is a Greek swimmer who competed in the 2000 Summer Olympics.
