= Daniela Götz =

German swimmer (born 1987)

Personal information
- Nationality: German
- Born: 23 December 1987 (age 38) Nürnberg, West Germany
- Height: 1.76 m (5 ft 9 1/2 in)
- Weight: 62 kg (137 lb)

Sport
- Sport: Swimming
Medal record
Women's swimming
Representing Germany
Olympic Games
Bronze medal – third place	2004 Athens	4×100 m medley
World Championships (LC)
Silver medal – second place	2003 Barcelona	4×100 m freestyle
Silver medal – second place	2005 Montreal	4×100 m freestyle
Bronze medal – third place	2005 Montreal	4×100 m medley

Daniela Götz (born 23 December 1987) is a German swimmer.

Götz represented Germany in the 2004 and 2008 Summer Olympics. She won a bronze medal at the 2004 Olympics in the 4 × 100 metre medley relay. At the 2008 Olympics, she competed in the 4 × 100 metre freestyle relay earning herself 5th place.
