= Eirini Kavarnou =

Greek swimmer (born 1980)

Personal information
- Born: July 5, 1980 (age 45)

Sport
- Sport: Swimming
Medal record
Representing Greece
Mediterranean Games
Bronze medal – third place	2001 Tunis	4x100m medley relay

Eirini Kavarnou (Greek: Ειρήνη Καβαρνού, born July 5, 1980) is a Greek swimmer. She competed in the 100 meter Butterfly at both the 2004 and 2008 Olympics
