= Kathryn Evans (swimmer) =

British swimmer (born 1981)

Personal information
- Full name: Kathryn Evans
- National team: Great Britain
- Born: 5 August 1981 (age 45) Luton, England
- Height: 1.76 m (5 ft 9 in)
- Weight: 67 kg (148 lb; 10.6 st)

Sport
- Sport: Swimming
- Strokes: Freestyle, medley
- Club: Nova Centurion
- Coach: Bill Furniss

Kathryn Evans (born 5 August 1981) is an English former competitive swimmer who represented Great Britain in the Olympic Games. Evans specialised in freestyle and individual medley events. She is a two-time Olympian (2000 and 2004), and a double British champion in the 200 m individual medley (2001 and 2002). Evans also played for Nova Centurion Swim Club in Nottingham, under head coach Bill Furniss. Evans is the cousin of late rower Acer Nethercott, who competed in the men's eight at the 2008 Summer Olympics in Beijing.

Evans made her Olympic debut, as a member of Team GB, at the 2000 Summer Olympics in Sydney, where she competed in the 200 m individual medley. Swimming in heat five, she rounded out a field of eight swimmers to last place and twenty-fourth overall in 2:19.41, just 5.58 seconds behind defending Olympic champion Yana Klochkova of Ukraine.

At the 2004 Summer Olympics in Athens, Evans competed only in two events as a relay swimmer. She finished second in the 100 m freestyle from the Olympic trials in Sheffield, posting a relay entry time of 55.52. On the first day of the Games, Evans helped out the Brits to pull off a sixth-place effort in the 4 × 100 m freestyle relay with a final time of 3:40.82. Teaming with Melanie Marshall, Karen Pickering, and Lisa Chapman in the final, Evans swam a second leg, and posted a lifetime best of 54.33. Exactly a week later, in the 4 × 100 m medley relay, Evans, along with Katy Sexton, Kirsty Balfour, and Georgina Lee, finished in fifth place, but were later disqualified due to an early take-off in the anchor freestyle leg.
