= Tine Bossuyt =

Belgian swimmer

Personal information
- Born: 10 June 1980 (age 46) Izegem, Belgium
- Height: 1.85 m (6 ft 1 in)
- Weight: 76 kg (168 lb)

Sport
- Club: FAST, Antwerpen
Medal record
Women's swimming
Representing Belgium
European Championships
Bronze medal – third place	2000 Helsinki	4×100 m freestyle relay

Tine Bossuyt (born 10 June 1980) is a retired Belgian swimmer who won a bronze medal in the 4 × 100 m freestyle relay at the 2000 European Aquatics Championships. She also competed in the 2000 Summer Olympics in the 100 m and 4 × 100 m freestyle events, but did not reach the finals.

After winning 33 national titles and setting 43 national records, Bossuyt retired from competitive swimming in May 2007.
