= Ana Belén Palomo =

Spanish swimmer

Personal information
- Full name: Ana Belén Palomo Jiménez
- Born: 20 October 1977 (age 48) Algeciras, Cádiz, Spain
Medal record
Representing Spain
Women's swimming
Summer Universiade
Bronze medal – third place	1999 Mallorca	50m Freestyle
Mediterranean Games
Gold medal – first place	2001 Tunis	50m Freestyle
Bronze medal – third place	2005 Almería	50m Freestyle

Ana Belén Palomo Jiménez (born 20 October 1977) is a freestyle swimmer from Spain, who competed for her native country at two consecutive Summer Olympics, starting in 2000 in Sydney, Australia. In both tournaments she was eliminated in the qualifying heats of the 50 m freestyle.
