= Katrin Meissner =

German swimmer (born 1973)

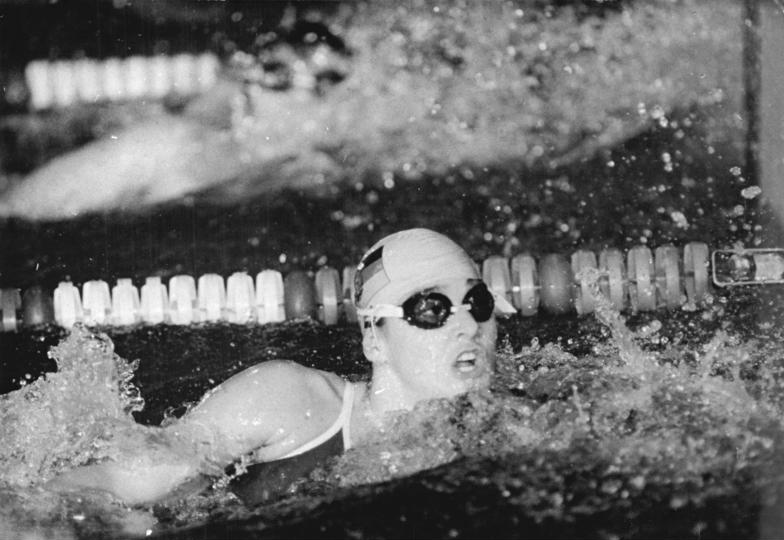
- Meissner in 1988

Personal information
- Full name: Katrin Meissner
- Nationality: East Germany (until 1990); Germany
- Born: 17 January 1973 (age 53) East Berlin, East Germany
- Height: 1.87 m (6 ft 2 in)
- Weight: 80 kg (176 lb)

Sport
- Sport: Swimming
- Strokes: Freestyle
- Club: SC Dynamo Berlin; Wasserfreunde Spandau 04
Medal record
Women's swimming
Event	1st	2nd	3rd
Olympic Games	2	0	1
World Championships (LC)	1	4	1
World Championships (SC)	0	3	0
European Championships (LC)	8	4	1
European Championships (SC)	3	4	1
Total	13	14	5
Olympic Games
Representing East Germany
Gold medal – first place	1988 Seoul	4×100 m medley
Gold medal – first place	1988 Seoul	4×100 m freestyle
Bronze medal – third place	1988 Seoul	50 m freestyle
World Championships (LC)
Representing Germany
Gold medal – first place	2001 Fukuoka	4×100 m freestyle
Silver medal – second place	1991 Perth	4×100 m freestyle
Silver medal – second place	1998 Perth	4×100 m freestyle
Silver medal – second place	2001 Fukuoka	100 m freestyle
Silver medal – second place	2003 Barcelona	4×100 m freestyle
Bronze medal – third place	1994 Rome	4×100 m freestyle
World Championships (SC)
Representing Germany
Silver medal – second place	1997 Gothenburg	4×100 m freestyle
Silver medal – second place	2000 Athens	4×100 m freestyle
Silver medal – second place	2000 Athens	4×100 m medley
European Championships (LC)
Representing East Germany
Gold medal – first place	1987 Strasbourg	4×100 m freestyle
Gold medal – first place	1989 Bonn	100 m freestyle
Gold medal – first place	1989 Bonn	4×100 m freestyle
Gold medal – first place	1989 Bonn	4×100 m medley
Silver medal – second place	1987 Strasbourg	50 m freestyle
Bronze medal – third place	1989 Bonn	50 m freestyle
Representing Germany
Gold medal – first place	1997 Seville	4×100 m freestyle
Gold medal – first place	1997 Seville	4×100 m medley
Gold medal – first place	1999 Istanbul	4×100 m freestyle
Gold medal – first place	2002 Berlin	4×100 m freestyle
Silver medal – second place	1991 Athens	4×100 m freestyle
Silver medal – second place	1991 Athens	4×100 m medley
Silver medal – second place	1999 Istanbul	4×100 m medley
European Championships (SC)
Representing Germany
Gold medal – first place	1996 Rostock	4×50 m freestyle
Gold medal – first place	1998 Sheffield	4×50 m freestyle
Gold medal – first place	1998 Sheffield	4×50 m medley
Silver medal – second place	1998 Sheffield	50 m freestyle
Silver medal – second place	1999 Lisbon	4×50 m freestyle
Silver medal – second place	1999 Lisbon	4×50 m medley
Silver medal – second place	2001 Antwerp	4×50 m medley
Bronze medal – third place	2001 Antwerp	4×50 m freestyle

Katrin Meissner (German: Katrin Meißner, born 17 January 1973) is a former freestyle swimmer from East Germany, who won three medals at the 1988 Summer Olympics in Seoul, South Korea. The fifteen-year-old triumphed with the GDR women's relay team in the 4×100 m medley and in the 4×100 m freestyle, and finished third in the 50 m freestyle.

Meissner is one of the few East German swimmers to also swim for Germany after reunification, mostly in the relays. She represented Germany at the 2000 Summer Olympics. Meissner retired in 2004 after not being selected for the 2004 Summer Olympics.

== See also ==
- List of German records in swimming
