= Nicolas Kintz =

French swimmer (born 1977)

Personal information
- Full name: Nicolas Kintz
- National team: France
- Born: 1 September 1977 (age 49) Épinal, Vosges, France
- Height: 1.86 m (6 ft 1 in)
- Weight: 86 kg (190 lb)

Sport
- Sport: Swimming
- Strokes: Freestyle
- College team: University of Georgia (U.S.)

Nicolas Kintz (born 1 September 1977) is a French former swimmer who competed in the 2000 Summer Olympics and in the 2004 Summer Olympics. He won no medal what so ever in both years.
