= Janine Belton =

British swimmer (born 1979)

Personal information
- Full name: Janine Claire Belton
- National team: Great Britain
- Born: 23 November 1979 (age 46) Bradford, England
- Height: 1.65 m (5 ft 5 in)
- Weight: 56 kg (123 lb; 8.8 st)

Sport
- Sport: Swimming
- Strokes: Freestyle
Medal record
Women's swimming
Representing Great Britain
World Championships (LC)
Gold medal – first place	2001 Fukuoka	4×200 m freestyle

Janine Claire Belton (born 23 November 1979), is an English former competitive swimmer who represented Great Britain at the Olympics and FINA world championships, and competed for England at the Commonwealth Games, during the 1990s and early 2000s.

Belton is best known for winning a gold medal at the 2001 FINA World Championships as a member of the first-place British women's 4×200-metre freestyle relay team alongside Nicola Jackson, Karen Legg and Karen Pickering.

She represented Great Britain at the 1996 and 2000 Olympic Games, in both instances as a member of the British women's 4×200-metre freestyle relay squad. In 1996 she swam in the preliminary heats of the 4x200-metre relay; in 2000 she swam in the heats and event final as a member of Britain's sixth-place team. At the 2002 Commonwealth Games in Manchester, she represented England while competing in the women's 200-metre freestyle.

At the British short course national championships in 2001, Karen Legg, Belton, Nicola Jackson and Karen Pickering set a new short course world record of 7:47.14 in the 4x200-metre freestyle relay.

== See also ==
- World record progression 4 × 200 metres freestyle relay
