= Sophie Simard =

Canadian swimmer

Personal information
- Full name: Sophie Simard
- National team: Canada
- Born: September 20, 1978 (age 47) Lars, Germany
- Height: 1.68 m (5 ft 6 in)
- Weight: 61 kg (134 lb)

Sport
- Sport: Swimming
- Strokes: Breaststroke
- College team: Université Laval
Medal record
Women's swimming
Representing Canada
Commonwealth Games
Bronze medal – third place	2006 Melbourne	4x100 m freestyle

Sophie Simard (born September 20, 1978) is an international freestyle and butterfly swimmer who competed for Canada at the 1996 Summer Olympics in Atlanta, Georgia. There she swam in the preliminary heats of the 4x200-metre freestyle relay, alongside Joanne Malar, Marianne Limpert, and Jessica Deglau. In the final she and Malar were replaced by Shannon Shakespeare and Andrea Schwartz. The resident of Sainte-Foy, Quebec was also a member of the Canadian national swimming team at the 2006 Commonwealth Games in Melbourne, Australia.
