= Melissa Caballero =

Spanish swimmer

Personal information
- Full name: Melissa Caballero Ayasse
- Born: 5 January 1985 (age 41) Barcelona, Spain
- Height: 176 cm (5 ft 9 in)
- Weight: 59 kg (130 lb)

Sport
- Country: Spain
- Sport: Swimming
Medal record
European Championships
Gold medal – first place	2004 Madrid	4x200m freestyle relay
Silver medal – second place	2002 Berlin	4x200m freestyle relay
European Short Course Championships
Bronze medal – third place	2003 Dublin	400 m freestyle

Melissa Caballero Ayasse (Note: In this Spanish name, the first or paternal surname is Caballero and the second or maternal family name is Ayasse.) (born 5 January 1985) is a Spanish former freestyle swimmer who competed in the 2004 Summer Olympics.
