= Cheng Jiaru =

Chinese swimmer

Personal information
- Born: March 4, 1985 (age 41) Zhejiang, China

Sport
- Sport: Swimming

Cheng Jiaru (born 4 March 1985) is an Olympic swimmer from China. She swam for China at the 2004 Olympics and the 2003 World Championships.
