= Paula Carballido =

Spanish swimmer

Personal information
- Born: June 30, 1979 (age 47)

Sport
- Sport: Swimming
- Strokes: Freestyle, medley
Medal record
Representing Spain
Mediterranean Games
| Gold medal – first place | 2001 Tunis | 200m individual medley |
| Gold medal – first place | 2001 Tunis | 400m individual medley |
| Gold medal – first place | 2001 Tunis | 4x200m freestyle relay |

Paula Carballido (born 30 June 1979) is a Spanish former freestyle and medley swimmer who competed in the 2000 Summer Olympics.
