= Alessa Ries =

German swimmer

Personal information
- Born: 1981 (age 44–45)

Sport
- Sport: Swimming
- Club: TG Heddesheim
Medal record
Swimming
Representing Germany
European Championships (LC)
Gold medal – first place	2002 Berlin	4×200 m freestyle
European Championships (SC)
Bronze medal – third place	Antwerp	200 m freestyle

Alessa Ries (born 1981) is a retired German swimmer who won a gold medal in the 4 × 200 m freestyle relay at the 2002 European Aquatics Championships.

She graduated in business economics from the University of Mannheim.
