= Marianna Lymperta =

Greek swimmer (born 1979)

Personal information
- Born: 25 June 1979 (age 47)

Sport
- Sport: Swimming
Medal record
Representing Greece
World Championships
Bronze medal – third place	2011 Shanghai	10km open water
European Championships
Bronze medal – third place	2010 Budapest	5km open water
Mediterranean Games
Silver medal – second place	2001 Tunis	4x200m freestyle relay
Bronze medal – third place	2001 Tunis	400m freestyle
Bronze medal – third place	2005 Almeria	1500m freestyle

Marianna Lymperta (Greek: Μαριάννα Λυμπερτά, born 25 June 1979) is an Olympic and national-record holding swimmer from Greece. She has won the bronze medal at the 2011 World Aquatics Championships, at the Open Water Swimming Women's 10 km event. She has also won the bronze medal at the 2010 European Aquatics Championships, at the Open Water Swimming Women's 5 km event.

She has swum for Greece at the:

- Olympics: 2000, 2004, 2008, 2012
- World Championships: 2003, 2009, 2011, 2013
- European Championships: 2010
- Mediterranean Games: 2001, 2005, 2013
- Open Water Worlds: 2008, 2010

At the 2010 European Championships, she set the Greek Records in the women's 800 and 1500 free (8:34.81 and 16:20.11).

At the 2012 Summer Olympics, she competed in the Women's marathon 10 kilometre, finishing in last place.

She was named the Greek Female Athlete of the Year for 2011.
