= Laura Roca =

Spanish swimmer

Personal information
- Full name: Laura Roca Montala
- Born: 8 January 1980 (age 46) Terrassa, Barcelona, Spain
- Height: 172 cm (5 ft 8 in)
- Weight: 58 kg (128 lb)

Sport
- Sport: Swimming
Medal record
Representing Spain
European Championships
Gold medal – first place	2004 Madrid	4x200m freestyle relay
Silver medal – second place	2002 Berlin	4x200m freestyle relay
Mediterranean Games
Gold medal – first place	1997 Bari	400m freestyle
Gold medal – first place	2001 Tunis	100m freestyle
Gold medal – first place	2001 Tunis	4x100m freestyle relay
Gold medal – first place	2001 Tunis	4x200m freestyle relay
Gold medal – first place	2001 Tunis	4x100m medley relay
Silver medal – second place	2001 Tunis	200m freestyle

Laura Roca Montala (Note: In this Spanish name, the first or paternal surname is Roca and the second or maternal family name is Montala.) (born 8 January 1980) is a Spanish former freestyle swimmer who competed in the 2000 Summer Olympics and in the 2004 Summer Olympics.
