= Aikaterini Bliamou =

Greek swimmer

Personal information
- Born: 15 October 1982 (age 43) Chryso, Kentriki Makedonia
Medal record
Women's swimming
Representing Greece
Mediterranean Games
Bronze medal – third place	2005 Almería	4×100 m freestyle

Aikaterini ("Katerina") Bliamou (Greek: Αικατερίνη "Κατερίνα" Μπλιάμου; born 15 October 1982 in Central Macedonia) is a former female backstroke and freestyle swimmer from Greece.

She won a bronze medal at the 2005 Mediterranean Games, and represented her native country at the 2000 Summer Olympics in Sydney, Australia.
