= Luisa Striani =

Italian swimmer (born 1978)

Personal information
- Born: 13 November 1978 (age 47) Benevento, Italy

Sport
- Sport: Swimming
Medal record
Representing Italy
European Championships
Silver medal – second place	2000 Helsinki	4x100m freestyle relay
Silver medal – second place	2000 Helsinki	4x200m freestyle relay
Mediterranean Games
Silver medal – second place	2001 Tunis	4x100m medley relay
Bronze medal – third place	2001 Tunis	4x100m freestyle relay
Bronze medal – third place	2001 Tunis	4x200m freestyle relay

Luisa Striani (born 13 November 1978) is an Italian former swimmer who competed in the 2000 Summer Olympics.
