= Cecilia Vianini =

Italian swimmer (born 1976)

Personal information
- Born: 19 November 1976 (age 49) Verona, Italy
Medal record
Women's swimming
Representing Italy
European LC Championships
| Silver medal – second place | 2000 Helsinki | 4×100 m freestyle |
| Silver medal – second place | 2000 Helsinki | 4×200 m freestyle |

Cecilia Vianini (born 19 November 1976 in Verona) is a former Italian freestyle swimmer. She achieved many European-level medals and was many times finalist in world level competitions, mainly in freestyle relays. She participated for Italy in the Summer Olympic of Atlanta 1996, Sydney 2000 and Athens 2004.

== See also ==
- Swimming at the 2004 Summer Olympics – Women's 4 × 100 metre freestyle relay
- Swimming at the 2004 Summer Olympics – Women's 4 × 200 metre freestyle relay
- Italy at the 2000 Summer Olympics
- Italy at the 1996 Summer Olympics
- European LC Championships 2000
- Swimming at the 1996 Summer Olympics – Women's 4 × 100 metre medley relay
