= Tatiana Rouba =

Spanish swimmer

Personal information
- Born: 15 September 1983 (age 42)
Medal record
Women's swimming
Representing Spain
European Championships (LC)
Gold medal – first place	2004 Madrid	4×200 m freestyle
Silver medal – second place	2002 Berlin	4×200 m freestyle
Mediterranean Games
Silver medal – second place	2005 Almería	4×100 m freestyle

Tatiana Rouba Beniarz (born 15 September 1983 in Barcelona, Catalonia) is a female freestyle swimmer from Spain, who competed for her native country at the 2004 Summer Olympics in Athens, Greece. There she was a member of the three women's relay teams. In 2002, she won the silver medal in the 4×200 m freestyle relay at the European Championships in Berlin.
