= Cristina Chiuso =

Italian swimmer

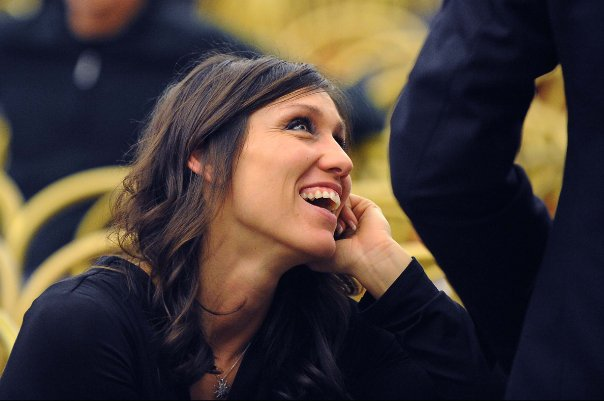

Personal information
- Nationality: Italy
- Born: 25 December 1973 (age 52) San Donà di Piave, Venice, Italy

Sport
- Sport: Swimming
- Strokes: Freestyle
Medal record
European LC Championships
Silver medal – second place	2000 Helsinki	4×100 m freestyle
Silver medal – second place	2008 Eindhoven	4×100 m freestyle
European Championships (SC)
Silver medal – second place	2005 Trieste	50 m freestyle
Summer Universiade
Silver medal – second place	1999 Mallorca	50 m freestyle
Mediterranean Games
Gold medal – first place	2005 Almería	50 m freestyle
Bronze medal – third place	2005 Almería	100 m freestyle

Cristina Chiuso is a former Italian swimmer.

Italian record holder of 50 freestyle and 4x100 freestyle relay in short and long course, was captain of Italian women swimming team.

She has participated four times at the Olympic Games (Barcelona 1992, Sydney 2000, Athens 2004, Beijing 2008) and 5 times at the Swimming world championships (Fukuoka 2001, Barcelona 2003, Montreal 2005, Melbourne 2007, Rome 2009). She has won two silver medals at the Swimming European Championships with the 4x100 freestyle relay team (2000 Helsinki and Eindhoven 2008), a silver medal at the European short course swimming championship in (Trieste 2005), one gold, three silver and two bronze medals at the Mediterranean Games and a total of 41 individual gold medals at the Italian Swimming Championships.

Cristina announced his retirement in October 2009 after the world swimming championship in Rome.

Now she is a sport marketing manager and a TV commentator for Sky Sport.

== See also ==
- Swimming at the 2004 Summer Olympics – Women's 4 × 100 metre freestyle relay
- Swimming at the 2004 Summer Olympics – Women's 4 × 200 metre freestyle relay
- Swimming at the 2004 Summer Olympics – Women's 50 metre freestyle
- Italy at the 1992 Summer Olympics
- Italy at the 2000 Summer Olympics
- Italy at the 2004 Summer Olympics
- European Short Course Swimming Championships 2005
- 2000 European Aquatics Championships
- European Short Course Swimming Championships 2006
