= Johanna Sjöberg =

Swedish swimmer (born 1978)

Personal information
- Full name: Maria Johanna Sjöberg
- Nationality: Sweden
- Born: 8 March 1978 (age 48) Bromölla, Sweden
- Height: 1.78 m (5 ft 10 in)

Sport
- Sport: Swimming
- Strokes: Freestyle and butterfly
- Club: Södertälje SS
Medal record
Women's swimming
Representing Sweden
Event	1st	2nd	3rd
Olympic Games	0	0	1
World Championships (SC)	5	4	5
European Championships (LC)	2	6	3
European Championships (SC)	10	12	7
Total	17	22	16
Olympic Games
Bronze medal – third place	2000 Sydney	4×100 m freestyle
World Championships (SC)
Gold medal – first place	1999 Hong Kong	4×200 m freestyle
Gold medal – first place	2000 Athens	4×100 m freestyle
Gold medal – first place	2000 Athens	4×100 m medley
Gold medal – first place	2002 Moscow	4×100 m freestyle
Gold medal – first place	2002 Moscow	4×100 m medley
Silver medal – second place	1997 Gothenburg	4×200 m freestyle
Silver medal – second place	1999 Hong Kong	100 m butterfly
Silver medal – second place	2000 Athens	100 m butterfly
Silver medal – second place	2004 Indianapolis	4×100 m freestyle
Bronze medal – third place	1995 Rio de Janeiro	4×100 m freestyle
Bronze medal – third place	1997 Gothenburg	4×100 m freestyle
Bronze medal – third place	1999 Hong Kong	4×100 m medley
Bronze medal – third place	2004 Indianapolis	4×200 m freestyle
Bronze medal – third place	2004 Indianapolis	4×100 m medley
European Championships (LC)
Gold medal – first place	1999 Istanbul	4×100 m medley
Gold medal – first place	2000 Helsinki	4×100 m freestyle
Silver medal – second place	1997 Seville	4×200 m freestyle
Silver medal – second place	1999 Istanbul	50 m butterfly
Silver medal – second place	1999 Istanbul	100 m butterfly
Silver medal – second place	1999 Istanbul	4×200 m freestyle
Silver medal – second place	2002 Berlin	4×100 m freestyle
Silver medal – second place	2002 Berlin	4×100 m medley
Bronze medal – third place	1997 Seville	100 m butterfly
Bronze medal – third place	2002 Berlin	4×200 m freestyle
Bronze medal – third place	2004 Madrid	4×100 m freestyle
European Championships (SC)
Gold medal – first place	1996 Rostock	50 m butterfly
Gold medal – first place	1996 Rostock	100 m butterfly
Gold medal – first place	1999 Lisbon	100 m butterfly
Gold medal – first place	1999 Lisbon	4×50 m freestyle
Gold medal – first place	1999 Lisbon	4×50 m medley
Gold medal – first place	2000 Valencia	4×50 m freestyle
Gold medal – first place	2000 Valencia	4×50 m medley
Gold medal – first place	2001 Antwerp	4×50 m freestyle
Gold medal – first place	2001 Antwerp	4×50 m medley
Gold medal – first place	2003 Dublin	4×50 m medley
Silver medal – second place	1996 Rostock	200 m butterfly
Silver medal – second place	1996 Rostock	4×50 m freestyle
Silver medal – second place	1998 Sheffield	100 m butterfly
Silver medal – second place	1998 Sheffield	4×50 m medley
Silver medal – second place	1999 Lisbon	50 m butterfly
Silver medal – second place	1999 Lisbon	200 m butterfly
Silver medal – second place	2000 Valencia	100 m freestyle
Silver medal – second place	2000 Valencia	100 m butterfly
Silver medal – second place	2001 Antwerp	100 m butterfly
Silver medal – second place	2003 Dublin	100 m butterfly
Silver medal – second place	2003 Dublin	4×50 m freestyle
Silver medal – second place	2005 Trieste	4×50 m freestyle
Bronze medal – third place	1996 Rostock	4×50 m medley
Bronze medal – third place	1998 Sheffield	50 m butterfly
Bronze medal – third place	1998 Sheffield	200 m butterfly
Bronze medal – third place	2000 Valencia	50 m butterfly
Bronze medal – third place	2001 Antwerp	50 m freestyle
Bronze medal – third place	2001 Antwerp	100 m freestyle
Bronze medal – third place	2005 Trieste	100 m butterfly

Johanna Sjöberg (born 8 March 1978) is a Swedish former international swimmer, who won her first medal in 1997 at the European Swimming Championships in Seville; a bronze in the 100 m butterfly.

== Clubs ==
- Bromöllaortens SS
- Helsingborgs SS
- Södertälje SS
- Spårvägens SF
