= Sara Parise =

Italian swimmer

Medal record

Representing Italy

Women's Swimming

European Championships (LC)
Silver medal – second place	2000 Helsinki	4×100 m freestyle
Silver medal – second place	2000 Helsinki	4×200 m freestyle

Sara Parise (born 19 January 1982 in Bolzano) is a freestyle swimmer from Italy who won two silver medals as a member of the relay teams at the 2002 European Championships. She represented her native country at two consecutive Summer Olympics, starting in 2000.
