= Nery Mantey Niangkouara =

Greek swimmer (born 1983)

Personal information
- Nationality: Greece
- Born: March 14, 1983 (age 43) Athens, Greece
- Height: 1.78 m (5 ft 10 in)
- Weight: 64 kg (141 lb)

Sport
- Sport: Swimming
- Strokes: Freestyle
Medal record
Women's swimming
Representing Greece
European Championships (LC)
Bronze medal – third place	2004 Madrid	100 m freestyle
Bronze medal – third place	2006 Budapest	100 m freestyle
Bronze medal – third place	2012 Debrecen	50 m freestyle

Nery Mantey Niangkouara (Greek: Νέρι Νιανγκουάρα) (born March 14, 1983, in Athens, Greece) is a Greek swimmer. She began her career at Nereus Halandri and then moved on to Panathinaikos. In 2001, she won 2 silver medals at the Mediterranean Games in the 100m and relay races. She was 5th in the European Championships in 2002 in Relay 4Ch100. She won the first medal for the Greek colors in the European Swimming Championships in Madrid, with a time of 55.05 in the 100m free. In the 2004 Olympics in Athens she was 6th in the 100m free and 7th in the 50 meters, and was disqualified in the 4 × 100 m free.

At the end of July 2005 she took 7th place at the World Aquatics Championships in Montreal in the final of the 100m free.

In 2006, she continued her streak of very good performances. Neri Niangkouara qualified for the final 100 meters free with performance of the 2nd semi (54.63, record, old 54.81 own by August 14, 2004) the European Aquatic Championships in Budapest in August 2006. Niangkouara managed to finish in third place in the final, August 2, 2006, with the national record (54.48). The old record was all of the previous day, 54.63.

In 2007 Niagkouara had good position in the International Military Games in India in the 50 meter freestyle, and finished in 6th place with 25.65.

In November 2007, Neri announced her decision to retire. However, she came back in style in 2012, competing at the Olympics again. As of September 2013 she is also a swimming trainer of Panathinaikos' youth academies. She is the daughter of a Kenyan father and a Greek mother.
