= Zoi Dimoschaki =

Greek swimmer (born 1985)

Medal record

Women's swimming

Representing Greece

Mediterranean Games
Gold medal – first place	2001 Tunis	200m Freestyle
Bronze medal – third place	2005 Almería	200m Freestyle
Bronze medal – third place	2005 Almería	400m Freestyle
Bronze medal – third place	2005 Almería	4x100m Freestyle

Zoi Dimoschaki (Ζωή Δημοσχάκη, born February 16, 1985) is a Greek freestyle swimmer. Dimoschaki administered the Olympic Oath at the Opening Ceremonies of the 2004 Summer Olympics.

Dimoschaki competed in the women's 200 m freestyle, Heat 6 at the 2004 Summer Olympics. She also competed in the Women's 200 m Freestyle at the 2000 Summer Olympics.

She is 6 feet (183 cm) tall.
