= Swimming at the 1998 World Aquatics Championships – Women's 200 metre breaststroke =

Women's 200m Breaststroke at the 1998 FINA World Championships
- Date: 15 January 1998
- Winning time: 2 minutes 25.45 seconds

Medalists
gold medal	Ágnes Kovács	Hungary
silver medal	Kristy Kowal	United States
bronze medal	Jenna Street	United States

The finals and the qualifying heats of the women's 200 metre breaststroke event at the 1998 World Aquatics Championships were held on Thursday 15 January 1998 in Perth, Western Australia.

== A Final ==
Rank	Name	Time
Gold medal	Ágnes Kovács (HUN)	2:25.45 CR
Silver medal	Kristy Kowal (USA)	2:26.19
Bronze medal	Jenna Street (USA)	2:26.50
4	Samantha Riley (AUS)	2:26.63
5	Masami Tanaka (JPN)	2:27.52
6	Penelope Heyns (RSA)	2:27.81
7	Brigitte Becue (BEL)	2:28.27
8	Svitlana Bondarenko (UKR)	2:31.00

== B Final ==
Rank	Name	Time
9	Anne Poleska (GER)	2:29.55
10	Lauren van Oosten (CAN)	2:30.26
11	Alicja Pęczak (POL)	2:30.49
12	Ina Hüging (GER)	2:30.55
13	Linda Hindmarsh (GBR)	2:30.90
14	Nadine Neumann (AUS)	2:31.21
15	Karine Brémond (FRA)	2:32.66
16	Dagmara Ajnenkiel (POL)	2:33.75

== Qualifying heats ==
Rank	Name	Time
1	Jenna Street (USA)	2:26.63 CR
2	Samantha Riley (AUS)	2:26.72
3	Ágnes Kovács (HUN)	2:27.21
4	Masami Tanaka (JPN)	2:27.71
5	Kristy Kowal (USA)	2:28.06
6	Svitlana Bondarenko (UKR)	2:28.88
7	Penelope Heyns (RSA)	2:28.99
8	Brigitte Becue (BEL)	2:29.18
9	Ina Hüging (GER)	2:29.94
10	Anne Poleska (GER)	2:30.54
11	Nadine Neumann (AUS)	2:30.58
12	Alicja Pęczak (POL)	2:30.73
13	Lauren van Oosten (CAN)	2:30.95
14	Linda Hindmarsh (GBR)	2:31.24
15	Dagmara Ajnenkiel (POL)	2:31.91
16	Karine Brémond (FRA)	2:32.04
17	Jaime King (GBR)	2:32.29
18	Inna Nikitina (UKR)	2:33.18
19	Beatrice Câșlaru (ROM)	2:33.49
20	Julia Russell (RSA)	2:33.69
21	Olesja Monchak (RUS)	2:34.06
21	Lenka Maňhalová (CZE)	2:34.06
23	Madelon Baans (NED)	2:35.35
24	Elvira Fischer (AUT)	2:35.65
25	Tara Sloan (CAN)	2:36.89
26	Nataša Kejžar (SLO)	2:37.11
27	Isabel Ceballos (COL)	2:38.53

== See also ==
- 1996 Women's Olympic Games 200m Breaststroke (Atlanta)
- 1997 Women's World SC Championships 200m Breaststroke (Gothenburg)
- 1997 Women's European LC Championships 200m Breaststroke (Seville)
- 2000 Women's Olympic Games 200m Breaststroke (Sydney)
