= Swimming at the 1998 World Aquatics Championships – Women's 4 × 100 metre medley relay =

Women's 4×100 metre medley relay at the 1998 FINA World Championships
- Date: 16 January 1998
- Winning time: 4 minutes 01.93 seconds

Medalists
gold medal	Lea Maurer; Kristy Kowal; Jenny Thompson; Amy Van Dyken	United States
silver medal	Meredith Smith; Helen Denman; Petria Thomas; Susie O'Neill	Australia
bronze medal	Mai Nakamura; Masami Tanaka; Ayari Aoyama; Sumika Minamoto	Japan

The final and the qualifying heats of the women's 4×100 metre medley relay event at the 1998 World Aquatics Championships were held on Friday 16 January 1998 in Perth, Western Australia.

== Final ==
Rank	Team	Time
Gold medal	United States; Lea Maurer; Kristy Kowal; Jenny Thompson; Amy Van Dyken	4:01.93; 1:01.91; 1:07.20; 57.89; 54.93
Silver medal	Australia; Meredith Smith; Helen Denman; Petria Thomas; Susie O'Neill	4:05.12; 1:02.73; 1:08.32; 58.68; 55.39
Bronze medal	Japan; Mai Nakamura; Masami Tanaka; Ayari Aoyama; Sumika Minamoto	4:06.27; 1:01.83; 1:10.24; 59.09; 55.11
4.	Germany; Sandra Völker; Sylvia Gerasch; Katrin Jake; Katrin Meissner	4:08.90; 1:02.32; 1:10.30; 1:00.84; 55.44
5.	Hungary; Annamaria Kiss; Ágnes Kovács; Anna Nyiry; Dora Jakab	4:11.41; 1:05.25; 1:08.29; 1:01.48; 56.39
6.	Netherlands; Angela Postma; Madelon Baans; Inge de Bruijn; Wilma van Hofwegen	4:11.73; 1:05.18; 1:11.53; 59.66; 55.36
7.	Great Britain; Sarah Price; Jaime King; Caroline Foot; Sue Rolph	4:13.33; 1:04.00; 1:11.22; 1:01.58; 56.53
—	Belgium; Sofie Wolfs; Brigitte Becue; Fabienne Dufour; Tine Bossuyt	DSQ

== Qualifying heats ==
=== Heat 1 ===
Rank	Team	Time
1	Germany; Sandra Völker; Anne Poleska; Silvia Szalai; Katrin Meissner	4:12.15; 1:02.72; 1:11.09; 1:01.76; 56.58
2	Belgium; Sofie Wolfs; Brigitte Becue; Fabienne Dufour; Tine Bossuyt	4:12.74; 1:04.31; 1:09.81; 1:02.34; 56.28
3	Poland; Izabela Burczyk; Dagmara Ajnenkiel; Anna Uryniuk; Alicja Pęczak	4:13.99; 1:03.73; 1:10.44; 1:01.78; 58.04
4	Russia; Yuliya Fomenko; Lyudmila Mamontova; Elena Nazemnova; Tatyana Litovchenko	4:18.84; 1:04.59; 1:14.12; 1:03.33; 56.80
—	Canada; Erin Gammel; Lauren van Oosten; Jessica Amey; Shannon Shakespeare	DSQ; 1:03.92; 1:10.36; 1:02.48; 55.99
—	China	DNS

=== Heat 2 ===
Rank	Team	Time
1	United States; Beth Botsford; Jenna Street; Misty Hyman; Barbara Bedford	4:07.99; 1:02.82; 1:10.17; 59.39; 55.61
2	Australia; Meredith Smith; Samantha Riley; Angela Kennedy; Sarah Ryan	4:08.64; 1:04.18; 1:08.55; 1:00.49; 55.42
3	Japan; Mai Nakamura; Masami Tanaka; Ayari Aoyama; Sumika Minamoto	4:09.10; 1:01.83; 1:11.73; 59.55; 55.99
4	Netherlands; Suze Valen; Madelon Baans; Inge de Bruijn; Wilma van Hofwegen	4:12.23; 1:05.26; 1:11.08; 1:00.47; 55.42
5	Hungary; Annamaria Kiss; Ágnes Kovács; Anna Nyiry; Dora Jakab	4:12.39; 1:05.05; 1:08.83; 1:01.93; 56.58
6	Great Britain; Sarah Price; Jaime King; Caroline Foot; Karen Pickering	4:13.39; 1:03.46; 1:11.49; 1:02.09; 56.35
7	Chinese Taipei; Chia-Hsien Kuan; Ya-Han Liao; I-Ju Huang; Meng-Chieh Lin	4:35.32; 1:10.48; 1:18.62; 1:05.38; 1:00.84

== See also ==
- 1996 Women's Olympic Games 4x100m Medley (Atlanta)
- 1997 Women's World Championships (SC) 4x100m Medley (Gothenburg)
- 1997 Women's European Championships (LC) 4x100m Medley (Seville)
- 2000 Women's Olympic Games 4x100m Medley (Sydney)
