= Swimming at the 1997 European Aquatics Championships – Women's 200 metre breaststroke =

The final of the Women's 200 metres Breaststroke event at the European LC Championships 1997 was held on Wednesday 20 August 1997 in Seville, Spain.

== Finals ==
RANK	FINAL A	TIME
	Ágnes Kovács (HUN)	2:24.90 ER
	Alicja Pęczak (POL)	2:28.04
	Brigitte Becue (BEL)	2:28.90
4.	Inna Nikitina (UKR)	2:29.76
5.	Jaime King (GBR)	2:30.02
6.	Anne Poleska (GER)	2:30.40
7.	Karine Brémond (FRA)	2:30.65
8.	Linda Hindmarsh (GBR)	2:31.68

RANK	FINAL B	TIME
9.	Lenka Maňhalová (CZE)	2:30.46
10.	Beata Kaminska (POL)	2:31.64
11.	Ina Hüging (GER)	2:32.38
12.	Larisa Lăcustă (ROM)	2:32.98
13.	Madelon Baans (NED)	2:33.69
14.	Elvira Fischer (AUT)	2:34.03
15.	Nataša Kejžar (SLO)	2:35.06
16.	Federica Biscia (ITA)	2:35.61

== Qualifying heats ==
RANK	FINAL A	TIME
1.	Ágnes Kovács (HUN)	2:27.81
2.	Jaime King (GBR)	2:29.91
3.	Alicja Pęczak (POL)	2:29.95
4.	Karine Brémond (FRA)	2:29.96
5.	Brigitte Becue (BEL)	2:30.08
6.	Anne Poleska (GER)	2:30.29
7.	Linda Hindmarsh (GBR)	2:31.55
8.	Inna Nikitina (UKR)	2:31.69
9.	Madelon Baans (NED)	2:32.16
10.	Lenka Maňhalová (CZE)	2:32.17
11.	Svitlana Bondarenko (UKR)	2:32.65
12.	Beata Kaminska (POL)	2:32.71
13.	Elvira Fischer (AUT)	2:33.03
14.	Ina Hüging (GER)	2:33.06
15.	Larisa Lăcustă (ROM)	2:33.26
16.	Nataša Kejžar (SLO)	2:35.21
17.	Federica Biscia (ITA)	2:36.38
18.	Alenka Kejžar (SLO)	2:36.53
19.	Mia Hagman (FIN)	2:38.74
20.	Britta Vestergaard (DEN)	2:39.38
21.	Aikaterini Sarakatsani (GRE)	2:41.05
22.	Mie Kristensen (DEN)	2:41.64

== See also ==
- 1996 Women's Olympic Games 200m Breaststroke
- 1997 Women's World Championships (SC) 200m Breaststroke
