= 1998 European Short Course Swimming Championships – Women's 100 metre breaststroke =

The finals and the qualifying heats of the Women's 100 metres Breaststroke event at the 1998 European Short Course Swimming Championships were held on the first day of the competition, on Friday 11 December 1998 in Sheffield, England.

== Finals ==
RANK	FINAL	TIME
Gold medal	Brigitte Becue (BEL)	1:07.71
Gold medal	Alicja Pęczak (POL)	1:07.71
Bronze medal	Svitlana Bondarenko (UKR)	1:07.86
4.	Nataša Kejžar (SLO)	1:08.61
5.	Sylvia Gerasch (GER)	1:08.85
6.	Madelon Baans (NED)	1:09.35
7.	Olga Moltchanova (RUS)	1:09.42
7.	Vera Lischka (AUT)	1:09.42

== Qualifying Heats ==
RANK	HEATS RANKING	TIME
1.	Alicja Pęczak (POL)	1:08.79
2.	Nataša Kejžar (SLO)	1:08.87
3.	Olga Moltchanova (RUS)	1:09.04
4.	Svitlana Bondarenko (UKR)	1:09.18
5.	Madelon Baans (NED)	1:09.25
6.	Sylvia Gerasch (GER)	1:09.46
7.	Brigitte Becue (BEL)	1:09.49
8.	Vera Lischka (AUT)	1:09.52
9.	Jaime King (GBR)	1:09.79
10.	Anne Poleska (GER)	1:09.94
11.	Petra Dufková (CZE)	1:10.42
12.	Maria Östling (SWE)	1:10.63
13.	Nienke Valen (NED)	1:10.70
14.	Joanne Mullins (GBR)	1:11.49
15.	Martyna Krawczyk (POL)	1:11.57
16.	Elvira Fischer (AUT)	1:11.89
17.	Smiljana Marinović (CRO)	1:11.93
18.	Natalia Kodajová (SVK)	1:12.68
19.	Emma Robinson (IRL)	1:12.71
20.	Julie Marchesin (FRA)	1:13.38
21.	Halldora Borgeirsd (ISL)	1:14.22
22.	Mariona Costa (ESP)	1:14.70

== See also ==
- 1996 Women's Olympic Games 100m Breaststroke
- 1997 Women's World SC Championships 100m Breaststroke
- 1997 Women's European LC Championships 100m Breaststroke
- 1998 Women's World LC Championships 100m Breaststroke
- 2000 Women's Olympic Games 100m Breaststroke
