= 1997 FINA Short Course World Championships – Women's 200m breaststroke =

The finals and the qualifying heats of the women's 200 metres breaststroke event at the 1997 FINA Short Course World Championships were held on the second day of the competition, on Friday 18 April 1997 in Gothenburg, Sweden.

== Finals ==
RANK	FINAL A	TIME
	Kristy Ellem (AUS)	2:22.68
	Larisa Lăcustă (ROM)	2:25.60
	Alicja Pęczak (POL)	2:25.62
4.	Wei Wang (CHN)	2:26.16
5.	Amanda Beard (USA)	2:27.29
6.	Julia Russell (RSA)	2:27.36
7.	Mi Tong (CHN)	2:27.83
8.	Rebecca Brown (AUS)	2:29.52

RANK	FINAL B	TIME
9.	Lenka Maňhalová (CZE)	2:26.86
10.	Anne Poleska (GER)	2:27.08
11.	Tara Sloan (CAN)	2:27.35
12.	Lena Eriksson (SWE)	2:27.40
13.	Britta Vestergaard (DEN)	2:29.84
14.	Elin Austevoll (NOR)	2:30.11
15.	Petra Dufková (CZE)	2:30.35
16.	Jaime King (GBR)	2:31.84

== Qualifying heats ==
RANK	HEATS RANKING	TIME
1.	Kristy Ellem (AUS)	2:23.87
2.	Larisa Lăcustă (ROM)	2:26.80
3.	Alicja Pęczak (POL)	2:27.69
4.	Rebecca Brown (AUS)	2:27.77
5.	Wei Wang (CHN)	2:28.19
6.	Julia Russell (RSA)	2:28.41
7.	Mi Tong (CHN)	2:28.69
8.	Amanda Beard (USA)	2:28.95
9.	Lena Eriksson (SWE)	2:29.40
10.	Lenka Maňhalová (CZE)	2:29.55
11.	Anne Poleska (GER)	2:29.98
12.	Elin Austevoll (NOR)	2:30.06
13.	Petra Dufková (CZE)	2:30.43
14.	Jaime King (GBR)	2:30.62
15.	Tara Sloan (CAN)	2:31.10
16.	Britta Vestergaard (DEN)	2:31.42
17.	Maria Östling (SWE)	2:31.48
18.	Linda Hindmarsh (GBR)	2:31.69
19.	Danica Wizniuk (CAN)	2:31.91
20.	Alenka Kejžar (SLO)	2:32.25
21.	Joana Soutinho (POR)	2:32.93
22.	Isabel Ceballos (COL)	2:32.98
23.	Nataša Kejžar (SLO)	2:33.47
24.	Monthakan Khamphiw (THA)	2:33.90
25.	Terrie Miller (NOR)	2:34.74
26.	Elzette Jordaan (RSA)	2:35.40
27.	Sandra Arroyo (CRC)	2:35.41
28.	Aikaterina Sarakatsani (GRE)	2:36.66
29.	Margarita Kalmikova (LAT)	2:36.82
30.	Kenia Puerta (VEN)	2:37.02
31.	Imaday Noaes (CUB)	2:37.65
32.	Adriana Marmolejo (MEX)	2:39.49
33.	Nadia Crub (ANG)	2:32.25

== See also ==
- 1996 Women's Olympic Games 200m Breaststroke
- 1997 Women's European LC Championships 200m Breaststroke
