= Swimming at the 1998 World Aquatics Championships – Women's 100 metre breaststroke =

Women's 100 metre breaststroke at the 1998 FINA World Championships
- Date: 13 January 1998
- Winning time: 1 minute 08.42 seconds

Medalists
| gold medal | Kristy Kowal | United States |
| silver medal | Helen Denman | Australia |
| bronze medal | Lauren van Oosten | Canada |

The finals and the qualifying heats of the women's 100 metre breaststroke event at the 1998 World Aquatics Championships were held on Tuesday 1998-01-13 in Perth, Western Australia.

== A Final ==
| Rank | Name | Time |
|---|---|---|
| Gold medal | Kristy Kowal (USA) | 1:08.42 |
| Silver medal | Helen Denman (AUS) | 1:08.51 |
| Bronze medal | Lauren van Oosten (CAN) | 1:08.66 |
| 4 | Ágnes Kovács (HUN) | 1:08.68 |
| 5 | Penelope Heyns (RSA) | 1:08.77 |
| 6 | Samantha Riley (AUS) | 1:08.80 |
| 7 | Svitlana Bondarenko (UKR) | 1:09.11 |
| 8 | Brigitte Becue (BEL) | 1:09.16 |

== B Final ==
| Rank | Name | Time |
|---|---|---|
| 9 | Dagmara Ajnenkiel (POL) | 1:10.20 |
| 10 | Zhang Yi (CHN) | 1:10.20 |
| 11 | Masami Tanaka (JPN) | 1:10.75 |
| 12 | Alicja Pęczak (POL) | 1:10.76 |
| 13 | Sylvia Gerasch (GER) | 1:11.11 |
| 14 | Tara Sloan (CAN) | 1:11.45 |
| 15 | Vera Lischka (AUT) | 1:11.79 |
| 16 | Sarah Poewe (RSA) | 1:12.61 |

== See also ==
- 1996 Women's Olympic Games 100m Breaststroke (Atlanta)
- 1997 Women's World SC Championships 100m Breaststroke (Gothenburg)
- 1997 Women's European LC Championships 100m Breaststroke (Seville)
- 2000 Women's Olympic Games 100m Breaststroke (Sydney)
