= Hungary at the 2000 Summer Olympics =

- IOC code: HUN
- NOC: Hungarian Olympic Committee
- Website: www.olimpia.hu (in Hungarian and English)

in Sydney
- Competitors: 178 (109 men and 69 women) in 23 sports
- Flag bearer: Rita Kőbán (canoeing)
- Medals Ranked 13th: Gold 8 Silver 6 Bronze 3 Total 17

Summer Olympics appearances (overview)
- 1896; 1900; 1904; 1908; 1912; 1920; 1924; 1928; 1932; 1936; 1948; 1952; 1956; 1960; 1964; 1968; 1972; 1976; 1980; 1984; 1988; 1992; 1996; 2000; 2004; 2008; 2012; 2016; 2020; 2024

Other related appearances
- 1906 Intercalated Games

Hungary competed at the 2000 Summer Olympics in Sydney, Australia. 178 competitors, 109 men and 69 women, took part in 137 events in 23 sports.

== Medalists ==
Medal	Name	Sport	Event
Gold	Tímea Nagy	Fencing	Women's épée
Gold	Zoltán Kammerer; Botond Storcz	Canoeing	K-2 500 metres
Gold	Gábor Horváth; Zoltán Kammerer; Ákos Vereckei; Botond Storcz	Canoeing	K-4 1000 metres
Gold	György Kolonics	Canoeing	C-1 500 metres
Gold	Ferenc Novák; Imre Pulai	Canoeing	C-2 500 metres
Gold	Szilveszter Csollány	Gymnastics	Men's rings
Gold	Ágnes Kovács	Swimming	Women's 200 m breaststroke
Gold	Hungary men's national water polo team: Tibor Benedek; Péter Biros; Rajmund Fodor; Tamás Kásás; Gergely Kiss; Zoltán Kósz; Tamás Märcz; Tamás Molnár; Rajmund Fodor; Barnabás Steinmetz; Zoltán Szécsi; Bulcsú Székely; Zsolt Varga; Attila Vári	Water polo	Men's tournament
Silver	Gábor Balogh	Modern pentathlon	Men's Competition
Silver	Katalin Kovács; Szilvia Szabó	Canoeing	Women's K-2 500 metres
Silver	Rita Kőbán; Szilvia Szabó; Erzsébet Viski; Katalin Kovács	Canoeing	Women's K-4 500 metres
Silver	Hungary women's national handball team: Beatrix Balogh; Rita Deli; Ágnes Farkas; Anikó Kántor; Beatrix Kökény; Anita Kulcsár; Dóra Lőwy; Anikó Nagy; Ildikó Pádár; Katalin Pálinger; Krisztina Pigniczki; Bojana Radulovics; Beáta Siti; Judit Simics	Handball	Women's tournament
Silver	Erzsébet Márkus	Weightlifting	Women's 69 kg
Silver	Sándor Bárdosi	Wrestling	Men's Greco-Roman 85 kg
Bronze	Zsolt Erdei	Boxing	Middleweight
Bronze	Krisztián Bártfai; Krisztián Veréb	Canoeing	Men's K-2 1000 metres
Bronze	Diána Igaly	Shooting	Women's skeet

== Athletics ==
=== Men's Competition ===
Men's 400 m

- Zsolt Szeglet

- Round 1 – 46.19 (→ did not advance)

Men's 800 m

- Balázs Korányi

- Round 1 – 01:46.21
- Semifinal – 01:47.35 (→ did not advance)

Men's 110 m Hurdles

- Balázs Kovács

- Round 1 – 13.83
- Round 2 – 13.78 (→ did not advance)

- Levente Csillag

- Round 1 – 13.66
- Round 2 – 13.75 (→ did not advance)

Men's 400 m Hurdles

- Tibor Bedi

- Round 1 – 51.54 (→ did not advance)

Men's 4 × 100 m

- Laszlo Babaly, Miklós Gyulai, Viktor Kovács, and Géza Pauer

- Round 1 – 39.52 (did not advance)

Men's 4 × 400 m

- Tibor Bedi, Zétény Dombi, Attila Kilvinger, and Zsolt Szeglet

- Round 1 – 03:06.50 (→ did not advance)

Men's Shot Put

- Szilard Kiss

- Qualifying – 18.95 (→ did not advance)

Men's Discus

- Róbert Fazekas

- Qualifying – 61.76 (→ did not advance)

- Gábor Máté

- Qualifying – 60.86 (→ did not advance)

- Zoltán Kővágó

- Qualifying – NM (→ did not advance)

Men's Hammer Throw

- Tibor Gécsek

- Qualifying – 77.33
- Final – 77.70 (→ 7th place)

- Zsolt Németh

- Qualifying – 73.95 (→ did not advance)

- Adrián Annus

- Qualifying – 75.41 (→ did not advance)

Men's Triple Jump

- Zsolt Czingler

- Qualifying – 16.52 (→ did not advance)

Men's 20 km Walk

- Sándor Urbanik

- Final – 0:01:26 (→ 29th place)

- Gyula Dudás

- Final – 1:28:34 (→ 37th place)

Men's 50 km Walk

- Gyula Dudás

- Final – 4:17:55 (→ 37th place)

- Zoltán Czukor

- Final – DSQ

Men's Decathlon

- Attila Zsivoczky

- 100 m – 11.10
- Long jump – 7.00
- Shot put – 14.96
- High jump – 2.06
- 400 m – 48.61
- 100 m Hurdles – 15.27
- Discus throw – 47.43
- Pole vault – 4.80
- Javelin throw – 65.87
- 1,500 m – 04:23.37

  - Points – 8277.00 (→ 8th place)
- Zsolt Kürtösi

- 100 m – 11.00
- Long jump – 7.19
- Shot put – 15.13
- High jump – 2.00
- 400 m – 48.81
- 100 m Hurdles – 14.15
- Discus throw – 46.62
- Pole vault – 4.80
- Javelin throw – 57.16
- 1,500 m – 04:43.39

  - Points – 8149.00 (→ 11th place)

=== Women's Competition ===
Women's 400 m

- Barbara Petráhn

- Round 1 – 52.86
- Round 2 – 52.72 (→ did not advance)

Women's 10,000 m

- Anikó Kálovics

- Round 1 – 33:20.40 (→ did not advance)

Women's Javelin Throw

- Nikolett Szabó

- Qualifying – 58.86 (→ did not advance)

Women's Hammer Throw

- Katalin Divós

- Qualifying – 62.74 (→ did not advance)

Women's Long Jump

- Tünde Vaszi

- Qualifying – 6.70
- Final – 6.59 (→ 8th place)

- Zita Ajkler

- Qualifying – 6.36 (→ did not advance)

Women's High Jump

- Dóra Győrffy

- Qualifying – 1.89 (→ did not advance)

Women's Pole Vault

- Zsuzsanna Szabó

- Qualifying – NM (→ did not advance)

- Katalin Donath

- Qualifying – NM (→ did not advance)

Women's 20 km Walk

- Mária Urbanik

- Final – 1:34:45 (→ 18th place)

- Anikó Szebenszky

- Final – 1:36:46 (→ 29th place)

Women's Marathon

- Judit Földing-Nagy

- Final – 2:30:54 (→ 17th place)

Women's Heptathlon

- Rita Ináncsi

- 100 m Hurdles – 15.11
- High jump – 1.69
- Shot put – DNS
- 200 m – DNS

== Boxing ==
Men's Light Flyweight (– 48 kg)

- Pál Lakatos
  - Round 1 – Bye
  - Round 2 – Lost to Un Chol Kim of DPR of Korea (→ did not advance)

Men's Light Middleweight (– 71 kg)

- Károly Balzsay
  - Round 1 – Bye
  - Round 2 – Lost to Pornchai Thongburan of Thailand (→ did not advance)

Men's Middleweight (– 75 kg)

- Zsolt Erdei
  - Round 1 – Bye
  - Round 2 – Defeated Vladislav Vizilter of Kyrgyzstan
  - Quarterfinal – Defeated Oleksandr Zubrihin of Ukraine
  - Semifinal – Lost to Gaidarbek Gaidarbekov of Russia → Bronze Medal

== Canoeing ==
=== Flatwater ===
==== Men's Competition ====
Men's Kayak Singles 500 m

- Ákos Vereckei

- Qualifying heat – 01:42.089
- Semifinal – 01:39.574
- Final – 02:00.145 (→ 4th place)

Men's Kayak Singles 1000 m

- Roland Kökény

- Qualifying heat – 03:38.066
- Semifinal – 03:39.455 (→ did not advance)

Men's Kayak Doubles 500 m

- Zoltan Kammerer and Botond Storcz

- Qualifying heat – 01:31.144
- Semifinal – Bye
- Final – 01:47.055 (→ Gold Medal)

Men's Kayak Doubles 1,000 m

- Krisztián Bártfai and Krisztian Vereb

- Qualifying heat – 03:13.677
- Semifinal – Bye
- Final – 03:16.357 (→ Bronze Medal)

Men's Kayak Fours 1,000 m

- Gabor Horvath, Zoltan Kammerer, Botond Storcz, and Ákos Vereckei

- Qualifying heat – 02:58.096
- Semifinal – Bye
- Final – 02:55.188 (→ Gold Medal)

Men's Canoe Singles 500 m

- Gyorgy Kolonics

- Qualifying heat – 01:51.492
- Semifinal – Bye
- Final – 02:24.813 (→ Gold Medal)

Men's Canoe Singles 1000 m

- György Zala

- Qualifying heat – 04:00.754
- Semifinal – 04:03.226 (→ did not advance)

Men's Canoe Doubles 500 m

- Imre Pulai and Ferenc Novák

- Qualifying heat – 01:42.816
- Semifinal – Bye
- Final – 01:51.284 (→ Gold Medal)

Men's Canoe Doubles 1,000 m

- Imre Pulai and Ferenc Novák

- Qualifying heat – 03:38.492
- Semifinal – Bye
- Final – 03:43.103 (→ 5th place)

==== Women's Competition ====
Women's Kayak Singles 500 m

- Rita Kőbán

- Qualifying heat – 01:50.777
- Semifinal – Bye
- Final – 02:19.668 (→ 6th place)

Women's Kayak Doubles 500 m

- Katalin Kovács, Szilvia Szabó

- Qualifying heat – 01:42.298
- Semifinal – Bye
- Final – 01:58.580 (→ Silver Medal)

Women's Kayak Fours 500 m

- Rita Kőbán, Katalin Kovács, Szilvia Szabó, Erzsébet Viski

- Qualifying heat – 01:33.312
- Semifinal – Bye
- Final – 01:34.946 (→ Silver Medal)

== Cycling ==
=== Track Cycling ===
Women's Sprint

- Szilvia Noemi Szabolcsi
  - Qualifying – 11.545
  - 1/8 Finals – Lost to Iryna Yanovych of Ukraine
  - 1/8 Finals Repechage – Heat 1; 1st place
  - Quarterfinal – Lost to Oxana Grichina of Russia
  - Finals 5-8 – (→ 5th place)

Women's 500 m Time Trial

- Szilvia Noemi Szabolcsi
  - Final – 35.778 (→ 12th place)

== Diving ==
Men's 3 Metre Springboard

- Imre Lengyel

- Preliminary – 382.98
- Semi-final – 222.60 – 605.58
- Final – 390.87 – 613.47 (→ 11th place)

Men's 10 Metre Platform

- Andras Hajinal

- Preliminary – 316.14 (→ did not advance, 34th place)

Women's 3 Metre Springboard

- Orsolya Pintér

- Preliminary – 239.64 (→ did not advance, 25th place)

== Fencing ==
Thirteen fencers, seven men and six women, represented Hungary in 2000.

Men's foil

- Márk Marsi

Men's épée

- Attila Fekete
- Iván Kovács

Men's team épée

- Attila Fekete, Márk Marsi, Iván Kovács

Men's sabre

- Domonkos Ferjancsik
- Csaba Köves
- Zsolt Nemcsik

Men's team sabre

- Zsolt Nemcsik, Csaba Köves, Domonkos Ferjancsik, Péter Takács

Women's foil

- Aida Mohamed
- Edina Knapek
- Gabriella Lantos

Women's team foil

- Edina Knapek, Gabriella Lantos, Aida Mohamed

Women's épée

- Tímea Nagy
- Ildikó Nébaldné Mincza
- Gyöngyi Szalay-Horváth

Women's team épée

- Tímea Nagy, Ildikó Nébaldné Mincza, Gyöngyi Szalay-Horváth

== Modern pentathlon ==
Men's Competition

- Gábor Balogh – 5353pts (→ Silver Medal)
- Péter Sárfalvi – 4971pts (→ 17th place)

Women's Competition

- Zsuzsanna Vörös – 4866 pts (→ 15th place)
- Nóra Simóka – 3042pts (→ 23rd place)

== Sailing ==
Five men and one woman competed for Hungary in the Sailing venue at the 2000 Olympics. The best finish was 15th.

Men's Mistral

- Aron Gadorfalvi

- Race 1 – (24)
- Race 2 – 19
- Race 3 – 19
- Race 4 – 23
- Race 5 – 21
- Race 6 – 23
- Race 7 – 21
- Race 8 – 17
- Race 9 – 14
- Race 10 – (37) OCS
- Race 11 – 20
- Final – 177 (24thplace)

Men's Single Handed Dinghy (Finn)

- Balázs Hajdú

- Race 1 – (26) DSQ
- Race 2 – 6
- Race 3 – 16
- Race 4 – 16
- Race 5 – 3
- Race 6 – 5
- Race 7 – (26) DNF
- Race 8 – 8
- Race 9 – 22
- Race 10 – 10
- Race 11 – 16
- Final – 102 (15th place)

Men's Double Handed Dinghy (470)

- Marcell S. Goszleth and Adam C. Szorenyi

- Race 1 – (30) OCS
- Race 2 – 20
- Race 3 – 19
- Race 4 – 18
- Race 5 – 25
- Race 6 – 24
- Race 7 – 26
- Race 8 – 17
- Race 9 – (29)
- Race 10 – 28
- Race 11 – 27
- Final – 204 (29th place)

Men's Laser

- Tamas Eszes

- Race 1 – 5
- Race 2 – (26)
- Race 3 – 9
- Race 4 – 13
- Race 5 – (44) DSQ
- Race 6 – 14
- Race 7 – 16
- Race 8 – 26
- Race 9 – 5
- Race 10 – 26
- Race 11 – 13
- Final – 127 (18thplace)

Women's Mistral

- Luca Gadorfalvi

- Race 1 – 23
- Race 2 – (26)
- Race 3 – 24
- Race 4 – 24
- Race 5 – (28)
- Race 6 – 21
- Race 7 – 25
- Race 8 – 21
- Race 9 – 15
- Race 10 – 23
- Race 11 – 25
- Final – 201 (25th place)

== Swimming ==
Men's 50 m Freestyle

- Attila Zubor

- Preliminary heat – 23.03 (→ did not advance)

Men's 100 m Freestyle

- Attila Zubor

- Preliminary heat – 49.79
- Semi-final – 49.58 (→ did not advance)

Men's 200 m Freestyle

- Béla Szabados

- Preliminary heat – 1:50.10
- Semi-final – 1:49.36 (→ did not advance)

- Attila Zubor

- Preliminary heat – 1:50.11
- Semi-final – 1:49.87 (→ did not advance)

Men's 400 m Freestyle

- Zoltán Szilágyi

- Preliminary heat – 03:58.94 (→ did not advance)

Men's 100 m Butterfly

- Zsolt Gáspár

- Preliminary heat – 53.29
- Semi-final – 53.45 (→ did not advance)

Men's 200 m Butterfly

- Viktor Bodrogi

- Preliminary heat – 02:00.75 (→ did not advance)

Men's 100 m Breaststroke

- Károly Güttler

- Preliminary heat – 01:01.66
- Semi-final – 01:01.83 (→ did not advance)

Men's 200 m Breaststroke

- Norbert Rózsa

- Preliminary heat – 02:15.27
- Semi-final – 02:14.67 (→ did not advance)

Men's 100 m Backstroke

- Péter Horváth

- Preliminary heat – 55.81
- Semi-final – 55.65 (→ did not advance)

Men's 200 m Backstroke

- Viktor Bodrogi

- Preliminary heat – DSQ (→ did not advance)

Men's 200 m Individual Medley

- Attila Czene

- Preliminary heat – 02:02.66
- Semi-final – 02:01.56
- Final – 02:01.16 (→ 4th place)

- István Batházi

- Preliminary heat – 02:03.63 (→ did not advance)

Men's 400 m Individual Medley

- István Batházi

- Preliminary heat – 04:18.85 (→ did not advance)

Men's 4 × 200 m Freestyle

- Attila Czene, Zsolt Gáspár, Jacint Simon, and Béla Szabados

- Preliminary heat – 07:24.48 (→ did not advance)

Men's 4 × 100 m Medley

- Péter Horváth, Károly Güttler, Zsolt Gáspár, and Attila Zubor

- Preliminary heat – 03:38.58
- Final – 03:39.09 (→ 5th place)

Women's 100 m Freestyle

- Gyongyver Lakos

- Preliminary heat – 57.71 (→ did not advance)

Women's 400 m Freestyle

- Éva Risztov

- Preliminary heat – 04:18.48 (→ did not advance)

Women's 800 m Freestyle

- Éva Risztov

- Preliminary heat – 08:43.07 (→ did not advance)

Women's 100 m Butterfly

- Orsolya Ferenczy

- Preliminary heat – 01:01.15 (→ did not advance)

Women's 200 m Butterfly

- Éva Risztov

- Preliminary heat – 02:11.32 (→ did not advance)

Women's 100 m Breaststroke

- Ágnes Kovács

- Preliminary heat – 01:08.50
- Semi-final – 01:07.79
- Final – 01:08.09 (→ 5th place)

Women's 200 m Breaststroke

- Ágnes Kovács

- Preliminary heat – 02:24.92
- Semi-final – 02:24.03 – Olympic Record
- Final – 02:24.35 (→ Gold Medal)

Women's 100 m Backstroke

- Annamaria Kiss

- Preliminary heat – 01:06.12 (→ did not advance)

Women's 200 m Backstroke

- Annamaria Kiss

- Preliminary heat – 02:20.40 (→ did not advance)

Women's 4 × 100 m Medley

- Orsolya Ferenczy, Annamaria Kiss, Ágnes Kovács, and Gyongyver Lakos

- Preliminary heat – 04:11.11 (→ did not advance)

== Synchronized swimming ==
Duet

- Zsuzsanna Hamori, Petra Marschalko

- Technical routine – 28.957 Did not compete in free routine

== Tennis ==
Men's Singles Competition

- Attila Sávolt

- First round – Lost to Paradorn Srichaphan (THA), 2-6 6-4 5–7

Alternates

Daniel Somogyi Gergely Kisgyorgy

Women's Singles Competition

- Rita Kuti-Kis

- First round – Lost to Amanda Coetzer (RSA), 1-6 1–6

- Petra Mandula

- First round – Lost to Conchita Martínez (ESP), 1-6 0–6

- Katalin Marosi

- First round – Lost to Monica Seles (USA), 0-6 1–6

== Triathlon ==
Men's Individual Competition

- Csaba Kuttor – 1:51:05.74 (→ 30th place)

Women's Individual Competition

- Nóra Edöcsény – 2:05:20.03 (→ 19th place)
- Erika Molnar – 2:05:39.50 (→ 23rd place)
- Aniko Gog – 2:14:50.55 (→ 39th place)

== Water polo ==
=== Men's team competition ===
- Preliminary round

Pos	Team	Pld	W	D	L	GF	GA	GD	Pts	Qualification
1	FR Yugoslavia	5	4	1	0	41	22	+19	9	Quarter Finals
2	Croatia	5	4	1	0	42	30	+12	9	Quarter Finals
3	Hungary	5	3	0	2	49	39	+10	6	Quarter Finals
4	United States	5	2	0	3	42	39	+3	4	Quarter Finals
5	Netherlands	5	1	0	4	34	55	−21	2	
6	Greece	5	0	0	5	22	45	−23	0	

Source: LA84
Rules for classification: 1) Points; 2) Head-to-head points; 3) Head-to-head goal difference; 4) Head-to-head goals scored; 5) Goal difference.

- 3-2-0

- Quarterfinals

- Defeated Italy (8-5)

- Semifinals

- Defeated Yugoslavia (8-7)

- Final

- Defeated Russia (13-6)

- Team roster

- Tibor Benedek
- Péter Biros
- Rajmund Fodor
- Tamás Kásás
- Gergely Kiss
- Zoltán Kósz
- Tamás Märcz
- Tamás Molnár
- Barnabás Steinmetz
- Zoltán Szécsi
- Bulcsú Székely
- Attila Vári
- Zsolt Varga

- Head coach: Dénes Kemény

== Weightlifting ==
Men

Athlete	Event	Snatch			Clean & Jerk			Total	Rank
Athlete	Event	1	2	3	1	2	3	Total	Rank
Péter Tamton	– 105 kg	175.0	~~180.0~~	~~180.0~~	~~215.0~~	~~215.0~~	—	DNF	—
Tibor Stark	+ 105 kg	180.0	190.0	195.0	220.0	230.0	—	425.0	8

Women

Athlete	Event	Snatch			Clean & Jerk			Total	Rank
Athlete	Event	1	2	3	1	2	3	Total	Rank
Erzsébet Márkus	– 69 kg	105.0	110.0	112.5	125.0	130.0	~~137.5~~	242.5	2nd place, silver medalist(s)
Gyöngyi Likerecz	– 75 kg	102.5	105.0	~~107.5~~	122.5	~~125.0~~	~~125.0~~	227.5	5
Melinda Szik	+ 75 kg	~~102.5~~	102.5	107.5	122.5	~~127.5~~	127.5	235.0	9

== Notes ==
- Wallechinsky, David (2004). The Complete Book of the Summer Olympics (Athens 2004 Edition). Toronto, Canada. ISBN 1-894963-32-6.
- International Olympic Committee (2001). The Results. Retrieved 12 November 2005.
- Sydney Organising Committee for the Olympic Games (2001). Official Report of the XXVII Olympiad Volume 1: Preparing for the Games. Retrieved 20 November 2005.
- Sydney Organising Committee for the Olympic Games (2001). Official Report of the XXVII Olympiad Volume 2: Celebrating the Games. Retrieved 20 November 2005.
- Sydney Organising Committee for the Olympic Games (2001). The Results. Retrieved 20 November 2005.
- International Olympic Committee Web Site
