= Swimming at the 1996 Summer Olympics – Women's 100 metre breaststroke =

Women's 100 metre breaststroke at the Games of the XXVI Olympiad
- Venue: Georgia Tech Aquatic Center
- Date: 21 July 1996 (heats & finals)
- Competitors: 46 from 38 nations
- Winning time: 1:07.73

Medalists
1st place, gold medalist(s)		Penny Heyns	South Africa
2nd place, silver medalist(s)		Amanda Beard	United States
3rd place, bronze medalist(s)		Samantha Riley	Australia

The women's 100 metre breaststroke event at the 1996 Summer Olympics took place on 21 July at the Georgia Tech Aquatic Center in Atlanta, United States.

== Records ==
Prior to this competition, the existing world and Olympic records were as follows.

World record	Penny Heyns (RSA)	1:07.46	Durban, South Africa	4 March 1996
Olympic record	Tanya Dangalakova (BUL)	1:07.95	Seoul, South Korea	23 September 1988

The following records were established during the competition:

Date	Round	Name	Nationality	Time	Record
21 July	Heat 6	Penny Heyns	South Africa	1:07.02	WR

== Results ==
=== Heats ===
Rule: The eight fastest swimmers advance to final A (Q), while the next eight to final B (q).

Rank	Heat	Lane	Name	Nationality	Time	Notes
1	6	4	Penny Heyns	South Africa	1:07.02	Q, WR
2	5	4	Amanda Beard	United States	1:09.04	Q
3	4	6	Ágnes Kovács	Hungary	1:09.05	Q, NR
4	5	3	Samantha Riley	Australia	1:09.37	Q
5	4	7	Vera Lischka	Austria	1:09.68	Q, NR
6	5	5	Guylaine Cloutier	Canada	1:09.72	Q
7	4	4	Svitlana Bondarenko	Ukraine	1:09.79	Q
8	6	5	Brigitte Becue	Belgium	1:09.83	Q
9	5	2	Masami Tanaka	Japan	1:09.89	q, NR
10	6	1	Elin Austevoll	Norway	1:09.96	q, NR
11	6	7	Manuela Dalla Valle	Italy	1:10.25	q
12	5	6	Lisa Flood	Canada	1:10.26	q
13	4	3	Han Xue	China	1:10.40	q
14	4	5	Helen Denman	Australia	1:10.64	q
15	4	1	Hanna Jaltner	Sweden	1:10.69	q
16	3	6	Alicja Pęczak	Poland	1:10.70	q
17	5	7	Jaime King	Great Britain	1:10.83	
18	5	1	Julia Russell	South Africa	1:10.87	
19	6	3	Kristine Quance	United States	1:10.92	
20	6	2	Terrie Miller	Norway	1:11.09	
21	6	8	Madelon Baans	Netherlands	1:11.17	
22	4	2	Kyoko Iwasaki	Japan	1:11.33	
23	4	8	Maria Östling	Sweden	1:11.58	
24	6	6	Yuan Yuan	China	1:11.65	
25	5	8	Karine Brémond	France	1:11.80	
26	3	5	Kathrin Dumitru	Germany	1:11.92	
27	3	7	Olga Landik	Russia	1:12.55	
28	3	2	María Olay	Spain	1:12.58	
29	2	3	Lenka Maňhalová	Czech Republic	1:12.72	
30	1	3	Byun Hye-young	South Korea	1:12.85	NR
31	3	3	Anna Wilson	New Zealand	1:12.93	
32	2	6	Mia Hagman	Finland	1:13.01	
33	3	8	Yelena Rudkovskaya	Belarus	1:13.71	
34	2	4	Joana Soutinho	Portugal	1:13.73	
35	3	4	Larisa Lăcustă	Romania	1:13.91	
36	1	6	Tay Li Leng	Malaysia	1:14.17	
37	2	2	Natália Kodajová	Slovakia	1:14.24	NR
38	1	5	Isabel Ceballos	Colombia	1:14.75	
39	2	5	Mou Ying-hsin	Chinese Taipei	1:14.82	
40	3	1	Joscelin Yeo	Singapore	1:14.90	
41	1	4	Snowie Pang Wang Yiu	Hong Kong	1:16.02	
42	2	1	María Carolina Santa Cruz	Argentina	1:16.19	
43	2	8	Nádia Cruz	Angola	1:16.62	
44	2	7	Cerian Gibbes	Trinidad and Tobago	1:16.99	
45	1	2	Anush Manukyan	Armenia	1:20.70	
46	1	7	Hem Reaksmey	Cambodia	1:44.68	

=== Finals ===
==== Final B ====
Rank	Lane	Name	Nationality	Time	Notes
9	2	Han Xue	China	1:09.90	
10	6	Lisa Flood	Canada	1:10.21	
11	7	Helen Denman	Australia	1:10.26	
12	5	Elin Austevoll	Norway	1:10.27	
13	4	Masami Tanaka	Japan	1:10.43	
14	8	Alicja Pęczak	Poland	1:10.44	
15	3	Manuela Dalla Valle	Italy	1:11.19	
16	1	Hanna Jaltner	Sweden	1:11.41	

==== Final A ====
Rank	Lane	Name	Nationality	Time	Notes
1st place, gold medalist(s)	4	Penny Heyns	South Africa	1:07.73	
2nd place, silver medalist(s)	5	Amanda Beard	United States	1:08.09	AM
3rd place, bronze medalist(s)	6	Samantha Riley	Australia	1:09.18	
4	1	Svitlana Bondarenko	Ukraine	1:09.21	NR
5	2	Vera Lischka	Austria	1:09.24	NR
6	7	Guylaine Cloutier	Canada	1:09.40	
7	3	Ágnes Kovács	Hungary	1:09.55	
8	8	Brigitte Becue	Belgium	1:09.79	
