= Swimming at the 1996 Summer Olympics – Women's 200 metre breaststroke =

Women's 200 metre breaststroke at the Games of the XXVI Olympiad
- Venue: Georgia Tech Aquatic Center
- Date: 23 July 1996 (heats & finals)
- Competitors: 42 from 35 nations
- Winning time: 2:25.41 OR

Medalists
1st place, gold medalist(s)		Penny Heyns	South Africa
2nd place, silver medalist(s)		Amanda Beard	United States
3rd place, bronze medalist(s)		Ágnes Kovács	Hungary

The women's 200 metre breaststroke event at the 1996 Summer Olympics took place on 21 July at the Georgia Tech Aquatic Center in Atlanta, United States.

== Records ==
Prior to this competition, the existing world and Olympic records were as follows.

World record	Rebecca Brown (AUS)	2:24.76	Brisbane, Australia	15 March 1994
Olympic record	Kyoko Iwasaki (JPN)	2:26.65	Barcelona, Spain	27 July 1992

The following records were established during the competition:

Date	Round	Name	Nationality	Time	Record
23 July	Heat 4	Penny Heyns	South Africa	2:26.63	OR
23 July	Final A	Penny Heyns	South Africa	2:25.41	OR

== Results ==
=== Heats ===
Rule: The eight fastest swimmers advance to final A (Q), while the next eight to final B (q).

Rank	Heat	Lane	Name	Nationality	Time	Notes
1	4	4	Penny Heyns	South Africa	2:26.63	Q, OR
2	5	4	Amanda Beard	United States	2:28.10	Q
3	6	4	Samantha Riley	Australia	2:28.30	Q
4	6	3	Masami Tanaka	Japan	2:29.36	Q
5	5	3	Ágnes Kovács	Hungary	2:29.58	Q
6	6	5	Brigitte Becue	Belgium	2:29.62	Q
7	5	6	Nadine Neumann	Australia	2:29.91	Q
8	6	6	Christin Petelski	Canada	2:30.30	Q
9	5	7	Lin Li	China	2:30.64	q
9	6	2	Alicja Pęczak	Poland	2:30.64	q
11	4	3	Kyoko Iwasaki	Japan	2:30.84	q
12	6	1	Marie Hardiman	Great Britain	2:31.12	q
13	5	5	Jilen Siroky	United States	2:31.57	q
14	4	7	Lena Eriksson	Sweden	2:31.65	q
15	5	2	Lenka Maňhalová	Czech Republic	2:32.14	q
16	4	2	Svitlana Bondarenko	Ukraine	2:32.42	q, WD
17	4	1	Julia Russell	South Africa	2:32.44	q
18	4	8	Elin Austevoll	Norway	2:32.48	
19	4	6	Riley Mants	Canada	2:32.97	
20	3	5	Alenka Kejžar	Slovenia	2:33.34	
21	6	7	Maria Östling	Sweden	2:33.44	
22	5	1	Yelena Makarova	Russia	2:33.74	
23	3	6	Lourdes Becerra	Spain	2:33.80	
24	3	4	Elvira Fischer	Austria	2:33.89	
24	4	5	Yuan Yuan	China	2:33.89	
26	5	8	Manuela Dalla Valle	Italy	2:34.76	
27	3	1	Mia Hagman	Finland	2:36.11	
28	3	7	Roh Joo-hee	South Korea	2:36.20	
29	2	4	Karine Brémond	France	2:36.26	
30	2	6	Isabel Ceballos	Colombia	2:36.94	
31	3	2	Kathrin Dumitru	Germany	2:37.07	
32	3	8	María Carolina Santa Cruz	Argentina	2:37.85	
33	6	8	Larisa Lăcustă	Romania	2:38.08	
34	2	7	Margarita Kalmikova	Latvia	2:39.63	NR
35	1	3	Erika Graf	Uruguay	2:42.97	
36	2	3	Mou Ying-hsin	Chinese Taipei	2:43.94	
37	2	2	Nádia Cruz	Angola	2:44.24	
38	2	1	Natália Kodajová	Slovakia	2:45.21	
39	2	5	Cerian Gibbes	Trinidad and Tobago	2:45.87	
40	1	5	Oksana Cherevko	Kyrgyzstan	2:57.65	
	1	4	Britta Vestergaard	Denmark	DNS	
	3	3	Anna Wilson	New Zealand	DNS	

=== Finals ===
==== Final B ====
Rank	Lane	Name	Nationality	Time	Notes
1	7	Lena Eriksson	Sweden	2:28.87	
2	3	Kyoko Iwasaki	Japan	2:29.32	
3	1	Lenka Maňhalová	Czech Republic	2:29.96	NR
4	8	Julia Russell	South Africa	2:30.38	
5	5	Alicja Pęczak	Poland	2:30.99	
6	6	Marie Hardiman	Great Britain	2:31.39	
7	2	Jilen Siroky	United States	2:33.43	
8	4	Lin Li	China	2:33.45	

==== Final A ====
Rank	Lane	Name	Nationality	Time	Notes
1st place, gold medalist(s)	4	Penny Heyns	South Africa	2:25.41	OR
2nd place, silver medalist(s)	5	Amanda Beard	United States	2:25.75	
3rd place, bronze medalist(s)	2	Ágnes Kovács	Hungary	2:26.57	NR
4	3	Samantha Riley	Australia	2:27.91	
5	6	Masami Tanaka	Japan	2:28.05	
6	1	Nadine Neumann	Australia	2:28.34	
7	7	Brigitte Becue	Belgium	2:28.36	NR
8	8	Christin Petelski	Canada	2:31.45	
