= Armenia at the 1996 Summer Olympics =

- IOC code: ARM
- NOC: National Olympic Committee of Armenia
- Website: www.armnoc.am (in Armenian)

in Atlanta
- Competitors: 32 (30 men, 2 women) in 11 sports
- Flag bearer: Aghvan Grigoryan
- Medals Ranked 45th: Gold 1 Silver 1 Bronze 0 Total 2

Summer Olympics appearances (overview)
- 1996; 2000; 2004; 2008; 2012; 2016; 2020; 2024

Other related appearances
- Russian Empire (1900–1912); Soviet Union (1952–1988); Unified Team (1992)

Armenia was represented at the 1996 Summer Olympics in Atlanta, Georgia, United States by the National Olympic Committee of Armenia.

It was the first time Armenia had competed at the summer Olympics following independence from the Soviet Union.

In total, 32 athletes including 30 men and two woman represented Armenia in 11 different sports including athletics, boxing, cycling, diving, gymnastics, judo, shooting, swimming, tennis, weightlifting and wrestling.

Armenia won two medals at the games, both in wrestling, after Armen Nazaryan claimed gold in the men's Greco-Roman 52 kg and Armen Mkrtchyan claimed silver in the men's freestyle 48 kg.

== Competitors ==
In total, 32 athletes represented Armenia at the 1996 Summer Olympics in Atlanta, Georgia, United States across 11 different sports.

Sport	Men	Women	Total
Athletics	2	0	2
Boxing	4	–	4
Cycling	1	0	1
Diving	1	1	2
Gymnastics	1	0	1
Judo	1	0	1
Shooting	1	0	1
Swimming	0	1	1
Tennis	1	0	1
Weightlifting	10	–	10
Wrestling	8	–	8
Total	30	2	32

== Medalists ==
Armenia won two medals at the games, both in wrestling, after Armen Nazaryan claimed gold in the men's Greco-Roman 52 kg and Armen Mkrtchyan claimed silver in the men's freestyle 48 kg.

Medal	Name	Sport	Event	Date
Gold	Armen Nazaryan	Wrestling	Men's Greco-Roman 52 kg	20 July
Silver	Armen Mkrtchyan	Wrestling	Men's freestyle 48 kg	30 July

== Athletics ==
In total, two Armenian athletes participated in the athletics events – Robert Emmiyan in the men's long jump and Armen Martirosyan in the men's triple jump.

Athlete	Event	Qualification		Final	
Athlete	Event	Distance	Position	Distance	Position
Robert Emmiyan	Long jump	7.76	28	Did not advance	
Armen Martirosyan	Triple jump	16.74	5 Q	16.97	5

== Boxing ==
In total,four Armenian athletes participated in the boxing events – Artur Gevorgyan in the featherweight category, Mekhak Ghazaryan in the lightweight category, Nshan Munchyan in the light flyweight category and Lernik Papyan in the flyweight category.

Athlete	Event	Round of 32	Round of 16	Quarterfinals	Semifinals	Final	
Athlete	Event	Opposition Result	Opposition Result	Opposition Result	Opposition Result	Opposition Result	Rank
Nshan Munchyan	light flyweight	Bye	Petrov (BUL); L 5–11	Did not advance			
Lernik Papyan	flyweight	Tsujimoto (JPN); W 10–5	Romero (CUB); L 6–22	Did not advance			
Artur Gevorgyan	featherweight	Konamegui (CMR); W 10–3	Mayweather Jr. (USA); L 3–16	Did not advance			
Mekhak Ghazaryan	lightweight	Bye	Strange (CAN); L 7–16	Did not advance			

== Cycling ==
In total, one Armenian athlete participated in the cycling events – Arsen Ghazaryan in the men's road race.

Athlete	Event	Time	Rank
Arsen Ghazaryan	Men's road race	Did not finish	

== Diving ==
In total, two Armenian athletes participated in the diving events – Hovhannes Avtandilyan in the men's 10 m platform and Arus Gyulbudaghyan in the women's 3 m springboard.

Athlete	Event	Preliminaries		Semifinals		Final	
Athlete	Event	Points	Rank	Points	Rank	Points	Rank
Hovhannes Avtandilyan	Men's 10 m platform	275.64	32	Did not advance			
Arus Gyulbudaghyan	Women's 3 m springboard	228.72	20	Did not advance			

== Gymnastics ==
In total, one Armenian athlete participated in the gymnastic events – Norayr Sargsyan in the men's artistic individual all-round.

Athlete	Event	Qualification		Final	
Athlete	Event	Total points	Position	Total points	Position
Norayr Sargsyan	Individual all-round	110.211	50	Did not advance	

== Judo ==
In total, one Armenian athlete participated in the judo events – Arsen Gevorgyan in the men's −78 kg category.

Athlete	Event	Preliminary	Round of 32	Round of 16	Quarterfinals	Semifinals	Final / BM	
Athlete	Event	Opposition Result	Opposition Result	Opposition Result	Opposition Result	Opposition Result	Opposition Result	Rank
Arsen Gevorgyan	Men's −78 kg	Bye	Yuan (CHN); L	Did not advance				

== Shooting ==
In total, one Armenian athlete participated in the shooting events – Hrachya Petikyan in the men's 50 m rifle three positions.

Athlete	Event	Qualification		Final	
Athlete	Event	Score	Position	Score	Position
Hrachya Petikyan	Men's 50 m rifle three positions	1164	13	Did not advance	

== Swimming ==
In total, one Armenian athlete participated in the swimming events – Anush Manukyan in the women's 100 m breaststroke.

Athlete	Event	Qualification		Final	
Athlete	Event	Time	Position	Time	Position
Anush Manukyan	100 m breaststroke	1:20.70	45	Did not advance	

== Tennis ==
In total, one Armenian athlete participated in the tennis events – Sargis Sargsian in the men's singles.

Athlete	Event	Round of 64	Round of 32	Round of 16	Quarterfinals	Semifinals	Final / BM	
Athlete	Event	Opposition Score	Opposition Score	Opposition Score	Opposition Score	Opposition Score	Opposition Score	Rank
Sargis Sargsian	Men's singles	Nestor (CAN); W 6–4, 6–4	Enqvist (SWE); L 6–4, 6–7, 4–6	Did not advance				

== Weightlifting ==
In total, 10 Armenian athletes participated in the weightlifting events – Hovhannes Barseghyan and Khachatur Kyapanaktsyan in the –76 kg category, Sergo Chakhoyan in the −83 kg category, Ashot Danielyan in the +108 kg category, Eduard Darbinyan in the −64 kg category, Aghvan Grigoryan in the −99 kg category, Aleksander Karapetyan in the −91 kg category, Israel Militosyan and Hayk Yeghiazaryan in the −70 kg category and Ara Vardanyan in the −108 kg category.

Athlete	Event	Snatch	Clean & Jerk	Total	Rank
Athlete	Event	Lift	Lift	Total	Rank
Eduard Darbinyan	−64 kg	132.5	160	292.5	12
Israel Militosyan	−70 kg	152.5	182.5	335	6
Hayk Yeghiazaryan	−70 kg	145	180	325	12
Hovhannes Barseghyan	–76 kg	155	190	345	8
Khachatur Kyapanaktsyan	–76 kg	165	Did not finish		
Sergo Chakhoyan	−83 kg	170	195	365	6
Aleksander Karapetyan	−91 kg	167.5	200	367.5	13
Aghvan Grigoryan	−99 kg	175	205	380	8
Ara Vardanyan	−108 kg	180	215	395	7
Ashot Danielyan	+108 kg	177.5	217.5	395	13

== Wrestling ==
In total, eight Armenian athletes participated in the wrestling events – Levon Geghamyan in the Greco-Roman −82 kg category, Arayik Gevorgyan in the −68 kg category, Aghasi Manukyan in the Greco-Roman −57 kg category, Mkhitar Manukyan in the Greco-Roman −62 kg category, Samvel Manukyan in the Greco-Roman −68 kg category, Armen Mkrtchyan in the freestyle −48 kg category, Armen Nazaryan in the Greco-Roman −52 kg category and Tsolak Yeghishyan in the Greco-Roman −90 kg category.

Greco–Roman

Athlete	Event	Round 1	Round 2	Round 3	Round 4	Round 5	Final / BM	
Athlete	Event	Opposition Result	Opposition Result	Opposition Result	Opposition Result	Opposition Result	Opposition Result	Rank
Armen Nazaryan	−52 kg	Kalashnykov (UKR); W 10–0	Tae-yeon (KOR); W 12–2	Danielyan (RUS); W 3–0	Rivas (CUB); W 7–1	n/a	Paulson (USA); W 5–1	1st place, gold medalist(s)
Aghasi Manukyan	−57 kg	Salhi (TUN); W 4–0	Khakymov (UKR); L 0–11	Aghayev (AZE); L 2–7	Did not advance			13
Mkhitar Manukyan	−62 kg	Guohong (CHN); W 11–0	Komyshenko (UKR); L 2–3	Aziz (SWE); W 4–0	Sang-sun (KOR); W 5–0 Fall	Pirim (TUR); L 4–9	Martynov (RUS); W WO	7
Samvel Manukyan	−68 kg	Karapinar (TUR); L 0–3	Escobar (COL); W 12–0	Daynes (CAN); W 9–3	Tretyakov (RUS); L 0–4	Did not advance		10
Levon Geghamyan	−82 kg	Lidberg (SWE); L 0–2	Farkas (HUN); W 4–0	Frinta (CZE); W 3–2	Jovančević (YUG); W 2–0	Turlykhanov (KAZ); L 1–3	Sanatbayev (KGZ); W WO	7
Tsolak Yeghishyan	−90 kg	Gelénesi (HUN); W 5–1	Konstantinidis (GRE); L 0–12	Rejepov (TKM); W 5–2	Sidorenko (BLR); L 1–3	Did not advance		9

Freestyle

Athlete	Event	Round 1	Round 2	Round 3	Round 4	Round 5	Final / BM	
Athlete	Event	Opposition Result	Opposition Result	Opposition Result	Opposition Result	Opposition Result	Opposition Result	Rank
Armen Mkrtchyan	−48 kg	Restrepo (COL); W 10–0	Eiter (USA); W 9–2	Vila (CUB); W 4–2	Railean (MDA); W 7–2	n/a	Il (KOR); L 4–5	2nd place, silver medalist(s)
Arayik Gevorgyan	−68 kg	Al-Osta (SYR); W 9–1	Gogol (BLR); W 3–2	Bye	Saunders (USA); L 0–4	Sánchez (CUB); L 4–8	Sang-ho (KOR); W 0–0	5

== See also ==
- Sports in Armenia
