= 1997 FINA Short Course World Championships – Women's 100m breaststroke =

The finals and the qualifying heats of the women's 100 metres breaststroke event at the 1997 FINA Short Course World Championships were held on the third day of the competition, on Saturday 19 April 1997 in Gothenburg, Sweden.

== Finals ==
RANK	FINAL A	TIME
	Kristy Ellem (AUS)	1:08.27
	Alicja Pęczak (POL)	1:08.33
	Svitlana Bondarenko (UKR)	1:08.39
4.	Julia Russell (RSA)	1:08.41
5.	Han Xue (CHN)	1:08.61
6.	Danica Wizniuk (CAN)	1:08.88
7.	Hanna Jaltner (SWE)	1:09.07
8.	Tara Sloan (CAN)	1:09.20

RANK	FINAL B	TIME
9.	Amanda Beard (USA)	1:09.04
10.	Vera Lischka (AUT)	1:09.80
11.	Manuela Dalla Valle (ITA)	1:09.99
12.	Terrie Miller (NOR)	1:10.20
13.	Mi Tong (CHN)	1:10.23
14.	Maria Östling (SWE)	1:10.42
15.	Elin Austevoll (NOR)	1:10.71
15.	Larisa Lăcustă (ROM)	1:10.71

== See also ==
- 1996 Women's Olympic Games 100m Breaststroke
- 1997 Women's European LC Championships 100m Breaststroke
