= Swimming at the 1997 European Aquatics Championships – Women's 4 × 100 metre medley relay =

The final of the Women's 4 × 100 m Medley Relay event at the European LC Championships 1997 was held on Sunday 24 August 1997 in Seville, Spain.

== Results ==
RANK	FINAL	TIME
	GERMANY; Antje Buschschulte; Sylvia Gerasch; Katrin Meissner; Sandra Völker	4:07.43; 1:02.45; 1:10.24; 1:00.41; 54.63
	RUSSIA; Olga Kochetkova; Olga Landik; Svetlana Pozdeeva; Natalya Mesheryakova	4:09.04; 1:02.46; 1:11.45; 1:00.08; 55.05
	GREAT BRITAIN; Sarah Price; Jaime King; Caroline Foot; Karen Pickering	4:10.31; 1:03.41; 1:10.11; 1:01.07; 55.72
4.	ITALY; Francesca Bissoli; Manuela Dalla Valle; Ilaria Tocchini; Cecilia Vianini	4:12.50; 1:04.78; 1:10.42; 1:00.49; 56.81
5.	NETHERLANDS; Suze Valen; Madelon Baans; Wilma van Hofwegen; Manon Masseurs	4:12.69; 1:03.92; 1:10.57; 1:01.57; 56.23
6.	FRANCE; Roxana Maracineanu; Karine Brémond; Cécile Jeanson; Solenne Figuès	4:13.20; 1:03.19; 1:11.98; 1:01.42; 56.61
7.	HUNGARY; Anna Nyiry; Ágnes Kovács; Edit Klocker; Katalin Revesz	4:14.10; 1:04.78; 1:07.97; 1:03.50; 57.85
8.	BELGIUM; Sabine Van Dooren; Brigitte Becue; Fabienne Dufour; Liesbet Dreesen	4:15.14; 1:05.28; 1:10.12; 1:02.90; 56.84

== Qualifying heats ==
RANK	HEATS RANKING	TIME
1.	GERMANY	4:12.00
2.	RUSSIA	4:12.60
3.	NETHERLANDS	4:13.68
4.	GREAT BRITAIN	4:13.80
5.	ITALY	4:13.84
6.	FRANCE	4:14.71
7.	HUNGARY	4:14.96
8.	BELGIUM	4:16.83
9.	SLOVENIA	4:18.26
10.	SPAIN	4:20.22
11.	ROMANIA	4:20.79
12.	DENMARK	4:26.80

== See also ==
- 1996 Women's Olympic Games 4 × 100 m Medley Relay
- 1997 Women's World Championships (SC) 4 × 100 m Medley Relay
