= Swimming at the 1997 European Aquatics Championships – Women's 100 metre breaststroke =

The final of the Women's 100 metres Breaststroke event at the European LC Championships 1997 was held on Friday 1997-08-22 in Seville, Spain.

== Finals ==
RANK	FINAL A	TIME
	Ágnes Kovács (HUN)	1:08.08
	Svitlana Bondarenko (UKR)	1:08.87
	Brigitte Becue (BEL)	1:09.42
4.	Alicja Pęczak (POL)	1:09.56
5.	Dagmara Ajnenkiel (POL)	1:09.81
6.	Madelon Baans (NED)	1:10.67
7.	Vera Lischka (AUT)	1:10.73
8.	Jaime King (GBR)	1:10.93

== See also ==
- 1996 Women's Olympic Games 100m Breaststroke
- 1997 Women's World Championships (SC) 100m Breaststroke
