= 2000 European Junior Swimming Championships =

Water sport competitions

The 2000 European Junior Swimming Championships were held from July 27 to July 30, 2000 in Dunkerque, France.

== Medal table ==
Rank	Nation	Gold	Silver	Bronze	Total
1	Germany (GER)	9	5	3	17
2	Hungary (HUN)	5	4	3	12
3	Russia (RUS)	5	3	7	15
4	Romania (ROM)	3	1	0	4
4	Ukraine (UKR)	3	1	0	4
6	Netherlands (NED)	2	6	3	11
7	Croatia (CRO)	2	2	0	4
8	Czech Republic (CZE)	2	0	1	3
9	Finland (FIN)	2	0	0	2
10	Denmark (DEN)	1	2	0	3
11	Israel (ISR)	1	1	1	3
12	Greece (GRE)	1	0	1	2
13	Austria (AUT)	1	0	0	1
13	Spain (ESP)	1	0	0	1
15	Great Britain (GBR)	0	4	3	7
16	France (FRA)	0	3	2	5
17	Italy (ITA)	0	2	2	4
18	Sweden (SWE)	0	1	3	4
19	Belarus (BLR)	0	1	2	3
19	Poland (POL)	0	1	2	3
19	Portugal (POR)	0	1	2	3
22	Iceland (ISL)	0	1	0	1
23	Norway (NOR)	0	0	3	3
Totals (23 entries)		38	39	38	115

== Medal summary ==
=== Boy's events ===
Event	Gold		Silver		Bronze	
50 m freestyle	Duje Draganja; Croatia	22.68; CR	Michele Scarica; Italy	23.08	Anton Naumenka; Belarus	23.30
100 m freestyle	Duje Draganja; Croatia	51.16	Johannes Oesterling; Germany	51.46	Květoslav Svoboda; Czech Republic	51.65
200 m freestyle	Květoslav Svoboda; Czech Republic	1:49.76; CR	Johannes Oesterling; Germany	1:51.90	Maxim Kouznetsov; Russia	1:52.25
400 m freestyle	Květoslav Svoboda; Czech Republic	3:53.40	Guy Noel Schmitt; France	3:54.35	Ilya Nikitin; Russia	3:55.30
1500 m freestyle	Hannes Kalteis; Austria	15:21.41	Guy Noel Schmitt; France	15:25.33	Vasileios Demetis; Greece	15:43.24
50 m backstroke	Toni Helbig; Germany	26.14; CR	Sander Ganzevles; Netherlands	26.85	Enrico Catalano; Italy	26.96
100 m backstroke	Toni Helbig; Germany	56.45	Viktor Bodrogi; Hungary	56.77	Sander Ganzevles; Netherlands	57.00
200 m backstroke	Viktor Bodrogi; Hungary	2:00.22; CR	Sander Ganzevles; Netherlands	2:00.39	David O'Brien; United Kingdom	2:03.25
50 m breaststroke	Mihály Flaskay; Hungary	28.54; CR	Vanja Rogulj; Croatia	28.60	Michael Fischer; Germany	28.79
100 m breaststroke	Michael Fischer; Germany	1:03.11	Vanja Rogulj; Croatia	1:03.25	Alexei Tiurine; Russia	1:04.57
200 m breaststroke	Thijs van Valkengoed; Netherlands	2:17.25	Jakob Johann Sveinsson; Iceland	2:18.63	Alexei Tiurine; Russia	2:18.78
50 m butterfly	Andriy Serdinov; Ukraine	24.75	Ricardo Coxo; Portugal	25.04	Evgeny Korotyshkin; Russia	25.17
100 m butterfly	Andriy Serdinov; Ukraine	53.73	Artur Akhmetov; Russia	54.88	Ricardo Coxo; Portugal	55.75
200 m butterfly	Sergiy Fesenko; Ukraine	2:00.03	Viktor Bodrogi; Hungary	2:00.97	Christian Galenda; Italy	2:02.88
200 m individual medley	Dirk Mennicke; Germany	2:04.74	James Goddard; United Kingdom	2:06.73	Georgios Dimitras; Netherlands	2:06.96
400 m individual medley	Vasileios Demetis; Greece	4:26.62	Georgios Dimitras; Netherlands	4:28.85	Tomasz Dziedzic; Poland	4:29.32
4 × 100 m freestyle relay	Germany	3:27.29	United Kingdom	3:27.89	France	3:27.98
4 × 200 m freestyle relay	Russia	7:31.33	Germany	7:31.63	France	7:33.92
4 × 100 m medley relay	Germany	3:45.82	Russia	3:47.21	Portugal	3:49.44

=== Girl's events ===
Event	Gold		Silver		Bronze	
50 m freestyle	Hanna Maria Seppala; Finland	26.07; CR	Hinkelien Schreuder; Netherlands	26.14	Antonia Albers; Germany	26.47
100 m freestyle	Hanna Maria Seppala; Finland	56.69	Marina Scheepbouwer; Netherlands	57.54	Hinkelien Schreuder; Netherlands	57.56
200 m freestyle	Irina Oufimtseva; Russia	2:02.00	Éva Risztov; Hungary	2:02.96	Ida Mattsson; Sweden	2:03.41
400 m freestyle	Éva Risztov; Hungary	4:12.12	Irina Oufimtseva; Russia	4:12.94	Kornélia Kovács; Hungary	4:16.29
800 m freestyle	Éva Risztov; Hungary	8:36.54	Olga Beresnyeva; Ukraine	8:36.73	Irina Oufimtseva; Russia	8:38.39
50 m backstroke	Louise Ornstedt; Denmark	29.37; CR	Aleksandra Herasimenia; Belarus	29.53	Tatsiana Platkouskya; Belarus	29.89
100 m backstroke	Diana Mocanu; Romania	1:01.85; CR	Louise Ornstedt; Denmark	1:02.10	Irina Raevskaia; Russia	1:03.14
200 m backstroke	Irina Raevskaia; Russia	2:13.25	Louise Ornstedt; Denmark	2:14.58	Louise Coull; United Kingdom	2:17.14
50 m breaststroke	Desiree Mahle; Germany	32.35; CR	Roberta Panara; Italy	33.03	Kirsty Balfour; United Kingdom/Anne Marie GulbrandsenNorway	33.33
100 m breaststroke	Desiree Mahle; Germany	1:10.78	Kirsty Balfour; United Kingdom	1:11.35	Anne Marie Gulbrandsen; Norway	1:11.49
200 m breaststroke	Desiree Mahle; Germany	2:31.04	Caroline Ruhnau; Germany	2:32.10	Anne Marie Gulbrandsen; Norway	2:32.74
50 m butterfly	Vered Borchovsky; Israel	27.30	Hinkelien Schreuder; Netherlands	27.50	Orsolya Ferenczy; Hungary	28.07
100 m butterfly	Diana Mocanu; Romania	1:00.19	Vered Borchovsky; Israel	1:00.92	Malgorzata Gembicka; Poland	1:01.70
200 m butterfly	Éva Risztov; Hungary	2:11.20; CR	Diana Mocanu; Romania	2:12.75	Malgorzata Gembicka; Poland	2:14.60
200 m individual medley	Diana Mocanu; Romania	2:14.42; CR	Sophie de Ronchi; France	2:18.35	Vered Borchovsky; Israel	2:19.40
400 m individual medley	Roser Vives; Spain	4:52.62	Ann Berglund; Sweden	4:55.22	Katalin Molnár; Hungary	4:56.65
4 × 100 m freestyle relay	Netherlands	3:49.77	Germany	3:51.39	Sweden	3:52.27
4 × 200 m freestyle relay	Russia	8:15.98	Hungary	8:22.79	Sweden	8:23.63
4 × 100 m medley relay	Russia	4:15.72	United Kingdom	4:16.44	Germany	4:17.05
