= Olga Moltchanova =

Russian-born Kyrgyz former swimmer (born 1979)

Personal information
- Full name: Olga Moltchanova
- National team: Kyrgyzstan; Russia
- Born: 4 February 1979 (age 47)
- Height: 1.78 m (5 ft 10 in)
- Weight: 70 kg (154 lb)

Sport
- Sport: Swimming
- Strokes: Breaststroke

Olga Moltchanova (Russian: Ольга Молчанова; born February 4, 1979) is a Russian-born Kyrgyz former swimmer, who specialized in breaststroke events. She became a top 8 finalist for Russia at the 1998 European Short Course Swimming Championships, and later switched nationalities to represent Kyrgyzstan at the 2000 Summer Olympics.

Moltchanova made her own swimming history at the 1998 European Championships (short course) in Sheffield, England, where she shared a seventh-place tie with Austria's Vera Lischka in the 100 m breaststroke (a matching time of 1:09.42).

Moltchanova competed for Kyrgyzstan in a breaststroke double at the 2000 Summer Olympics in Sydney. She achieved FINA B-standards of 1:13.26 (100 m breaststroke) and 2:37.31 (200 m breaststroke) from the Kazakhstan Open Championships in Almaty. On the second day of the Games, Moltchanova placed thirty-fourth in the 100 m breaststroke. Swimming in heat two, she faded down the stretch from third at the opening length to pick up a fourth seed in 1:14.41, more than a second below her entry standard. Three days later, in the 200 m breaststroke, Moltchanova posted a time of 2:41.43 in heat one, but finished farther from the top 16 field with a thirty-third place effort.
