= Swimming at the 1999 Pan American Games – Women's 200 metre breaststroke =

Women's 200 metre breaststroke at the 1999 Pan American Games
- Venue: Pan Am Pool
- Dates: August 3 (preliminaries and finals)
- Competitors: from - nations

Medalists
Gold medal	Lauren van Oosten	Canada
Silver medal	Annemieke McReynolds	United States
Bronze medal	Katie Yevak	United States

The women's 200 metre breaststroke competition of the swimming events at the 1999 Pan American Games took place on 3 August at the Pan Am Pool. The last Pan American Games champion was Lisa Flood of Canada.

This race consisted of four lengths of the pool, all in breaststroke.

== Results ==
All times are in minutes and seconds.

KEY:	q	Fastest non-qualifiers	Q	Qualified	GR	Games record	NR	National record	PB	Personal best	SB	Seasonal best

=== B Final ===
The B final was held on August 3.

Rank	Name	Nationality	Time	Notes
9	Imaday Nuñez	Cuba	2:36.36	
10	Cerian Gibbes	Trinidad and Tobago	2:39.28	
11	Maria Ortiz	Colombia	2:39.40	
12	Valeria Silva	Peru	2:47.19	
13	Kenia Puertas	Venezuela	2:51.68	
14	R.Encina	Paraguay	2:54.15	

=== A Final ===
The A final was held on August 3.

Rank	Name	Nationality	Time	Notes
1st place, gold medalist(s)	Lauren van Oosten	Canada	2:30.36	
2nd place, silver medalist(s)	Annemieke McReynolds	United States	2:30.53	
3rd place, bronze medalist(s)	Katie Yevak	United States	2:32.85	
4	Adriana Marmolejo	Mexico	2:36.25	
5	Mikeila Leyva	Cuba	2:36.53	
6	Isabel Ceballos	Colombia	2:37.28	
7	Patrícia Comini	Brazil	2:37.69	
8	Tara Sloan	Canada	2:39.47	
