= Ina Hüging =

German swimmer

Personal information
- Full name: Ina Hüging
- National team: Germany
- Born: 7 January 1980 (age 46) Quedlinburg, Saxony-Anhalt, East Germany
- Height: 1.78 m (5 ft 10 in)
- Weight: 59 kg (130 lb)

Sport
- Sport: Swimming
- Strokes: Breaststroke
- Club: SG Schwimmen Münster
- Coach: Henning Lambertz

Ina Hüging (born January 7, 1980) is a German former swimmer, who specialized in breaststroke events. She became a top 16 finalist in the 200 m breaststroke at the World and European Championships (1997 and 1998), and later represented Germany, as a 20-year-old, at the 2000 Summer Olympics. During her sporting career, Hüging trained for Münster Swim Sport Club (German: Sport Gemeinschaft Schwimmen Münster), under longtime coach and mentor Henning Lambertz.

Hüging made her own swimming history at the 1997 European Aquatics Championships in Seville, Spain, finishing eleventh in the consolation final of the 200 m breaststroke at 2:32.38. The following year, at the 1998 FINA World Championships in Perth, Australia, Hüging lowered her personal best to 2:30.55 in the 200 m breaststroke, worthily enough for a twelfth-place effort.

At the 2000 Summer Olympics in Sydney, Hüging competed only in the women's 200 m breaststroke. She finished behind her teammate Anne Poleska from the German Olympic Trials in Berlin, with a FINA A-standard of 2:28.31. She challenged seven other swimmers in heat three, including Poleska, U.S. duo Kristy Kowal and Amanda Beard, and South Africa's top favorite Sarah Poewe. Hüging faded down the final stretch to pick up a fifth seed in a time of 2:30.00, but missed the semifinals by exactly four-tenths of a second (0.40), finishing only in seventeenth overall from the prelims.
