= Orsolya Ferenczy =

Hungarian swimmer

Personal information
- Full name: Orsolya Ferenczy
- Nickname: Orsi
- National team: Hungary
- Born: 25 June 1984 (age 42) Vác, Hungary
- Height: 1.70 m (5 ft 7 in)
- Weight: 53 kg (117 lb)

Sport
- Sport: Swimming
- Strokes: Butterfly
- Club: Budapest Honvéd
- College team: University of Maryland (U.S.)
- Coach: József Nagy; Jim Wenhold (U.S.)
Medal record
Women's swimming
Representing Hungary
European Junior Championships
Bronze medal – third place	2000 Dunkerque	50 m butterfly

Orsolya "Orsi" Ferenczy (born 25 June 1984) is a Hungarian former swimmer, who specialized in butterfly events. She captured a bronze medal from the European Junior Championships, and later represented Hungary, as a 16-year-old, at the 2000 Summer Olympics. Ferenczy also held a national record in the 100 m butterfly (1:00.37), until it was later broken by Beatrix Boulsevicz in 2003.

Ferenczy made her own swimming history, as a 16-year-old teen newcomer, at the 2000 European Junior Swimming Championships in Dunkerque, France, where she earned a bronze medal in the 50 m butterfly with a time of 28.07, finishing behind Israel's Vered Borochovski and Netherlands' Hinkelien Schreuder by more than half a second (0.50).

At the 2000 Summer Olympics in Sydney, Ferenczy competed only in two swimming events. She achieved a FINA B-cut of 1:01.01 from the Hungarian Championships in Budapest. On the first day of the Games, Ferenczy placed twenty-third in the 100 m butterfly. Swimming in heat four, she faded down the stretch from second at the final turn to share a third seed with Belgium's Fabienne Dufour in a matching time of 1:01.15. Ferenczy also teamed up with Ágnes Kovács, Gyöngyver Lakos, and Annamária Kiss in the 4 × 100 m medley relay. Swimming the butterfly leg in heat one, Ferenczy posted a split of 1:00.61, but the Hungarians raced to the fifth spot and thirteenth overall in a final time of 4:11.11.

Ferenczy also attended the University of Maryland in College Park, Maryland, where she majored in psychology and played for the Maryland Terrapins swimming and water polo team, under head coach Jim Wenhold, from 2003 to 2007. While swimming for the Terrapins, she posted a career best in the 100-yard butterfly (57.31) at the 2003 NCAA Division I Championships.
