= 1992 European Junior Swimming Championships =

International swimming competition

The 1992 European Junior Swimming Championships were held from 13–18 August 1992 in Leeds, Great Britain.

== Medal table ==
* Host nation (Great Britain)

Rank	Nation	Gold	Silver	Bronze	Total
1	Germany (GER)	9	4	3	16
2	Russia (RUS)	4	7	3	14
3	Spain (ESP)	4	1	2	7
4	Poland (POL)	3	1	3	7
5	Hungary (HUN)	2	3	0	5
6	Netherlands (NED)	2	0	3	5
7	Great Britain (GBR)*	1	4	5	10
8	Romania (ROM)	1	2	0	3
9	Czechoslovakia (TCH)	1	1	0	2
10	Bulgaria (BUL)	1	0	0	1
10	Sweden (SWE)	1	0	0	1
10	Turkey (TUR)	1	0	0	1
13	France (FRA)	0	4	9	13
14	Italy (ITA)	0	4	0	4
15	Austria (AUT)	0	0	1	1
Totals (15 entries)		30	31	29	90

== Medal summary ==
=== Boy's events ===
Event	Gold		Silver		Bronze	
100 m freestyle	Martin Carl; Great Britain	52.12	Pavel Bustrov; Russia	52.23	Romain Barnier; France	52.31
200 m freestyle	Stefan Aartsen; Netherlands	1:53.80	Moreno Gallina; Italy	1:54.99	Alexei Stepanov; Russia	1:55.26
400 m freestyle	Alexei Stepanov; Russia	4:00.91	Jerome Scherman; France	4:02.04	Mikhail Uzefovich; Russia	4:02.30
1500 m freestyle	Mikhail Uzefovich; Russia	15:44.30	Graeme Smith; Great Britain	15:47.25	Vincent Hamelin; France	15:47.97
100 m backstroke	Derya Büyükuncu; Turkey	58.53	Mirko Mazzan; Italy	58.93	Mariusz Siembida; Poland	59.25
200 m backstroke	Bartosz Sikora; Poland	2:04.12	Mirko Mazzan; Italy	2:04.64	David Joncourt; France	2:04.98
100 m breaststroke	Dobromir Petrov; Bulgaria	1:05.00	Roman Havrlant; Czechoslovakia	1:05.26	Lionel Blas; France	1:06.05
200 m breaststroke	Gabor Juhasz; Hungary	2:21.80	Andrei Perminov; Russia	2:22.34	Andrew Ayers; Great Britain	2:22.60
100 m butterfly	Jorge Ulibarri; Spain	56.37	Andrei Cheynyshov; Russia	57.12	Lars Mersenburg; Germany	57.51
200 m butterfly	Xavier Fortuna; Spain	2:06.26	Mario Esposito; Italy	2:06.58	David Abrad; France	2:06.86
200 m individual medley	Attila Zubor; Hungary	2:07.79	Vilmos Kovacs; Hungary	2:08.05	David Joncourt; France	2:08.73
400 m individual medley	Petr Kratchovil; Czechoslovakia	4:27.62	David Joncourt; France	4:31.39	David Paxton; Great Britain	4:34.28
4 × 100 m freestyle relay	Germany	3:30.32	Spain	3:30.36	Russia	3:31.16
4 × 200 m freestyle relay	Sweden	7:40.63	Great Britain	7:40.79	Spain	7:41.64
4 × 100 m medley relay	Spain	3:55.38	Great Britain	3:55.48	Netherlands	3:55.90

=== Girl's events ===
Event	Gold		Silver		Bronze	
100 m freestyle	Franziska van Almsick; Germany	55.27	Gyöngyvér Lakos; Hungary; Anja Kleber; Germany	58.99	none	
200 m freestyle	Franziska van Almsick; Germany	2:01.38	Ileana Buciu; Romania	2:05.35	Jutta Renner; Germany	2:05.41
400 m freestyle	S. van de Loo; Netherlands	4:18.95	Katalin Moldvai; Hungary	4:19.74	Audrey Astruc; France	4:19.76
800 m freestyle	Ioana Naghi; Romania	8:48.76	Audrey Astruc; France	8:53.77	S. van de Loo; Netherlands	8:55.71
100 m backstroke	Nina Zhivanevskaya; Russia	1:02.89	Cathleen Stolze; Germany	1:03.93	Alexa Bennett; Great Britain	1:05.15
200 m backstroke	Cathleen Stolze; Germany	2:13.33	Nina Zhivanevskaya; Russia	2:13.84	N. van de Woerd; Netherlands	2:18.32
100 m breaststroke	Dagmara Ajnenkiel; Poland	1:12.84	Lynsey Rogers; Great Britain	1:13.18	Cecile Lebars; France	1:13.81
200 m breaststroke	Anna Kaczmarczyk; Poland	2:36.38	Dagmara Ajnenkiel; Poland	2:36.45	Elvira Fischer; Austria	2:36.58
100 m butterfly	Franziska van Almsick; Germany	1:00.62	Natalia Razumova; Russia	1:01.72	María Peláez; Spain	1:02.04
200 m butterfly	María Peláez; Spain	2:17.04	Svetlana Pozdeeva; Russia	2:16.54	Jessica Lindner; Germany	2:16.97
200 m individual medley	Franziska van Almsick; Germany	2:17.04	Cathleen Stolze; Germany	2:19.10	Agnieszka Zalewska; Poland	2:21.76
400 m individual medley	Cathleen Stolze; Germany	4:53.48	Valerie Torrente; France	4:55.07	Agnieszka Zalewska; Poland	4:56.39
4 × 100 m freestyle relay	Germany	3:52.15	Russia	3:55.17	Great Britain	3:57.14
4 × 200 m freestyle relay	Germany	8:25.12	Romania	8:28.80	France	8:30.36
4 × 100 m medley relay	Russia	4:16.64	Germany	4:17.00	Great Britain	4:22.21
