= Swimming at the 1999 Pan American Games – Women's 100 metre breaststroke =

Women's 100 metre breaststroke at the 1999 Pan American Games
- Venue: Pan Am Pool
- Dates: August 5 (preliminaries and finals)
- Competitors: from - nations

Medalists
Gold medal	Staciana Stitts	United States
Silver medal	Kristen Woodring	United States
Bronze medal	Lauren van Oosten	Canada

The women's 100 metre breaststroke competition of the swimming events at the 1999 Pan American Games took place on 5 August at the Pan Am Pool. The last Pan American Games champion was Lisa Flood of Canada.

This race consisted of two lengths of the pool, both lengths being in breaststroke.

== Results ==
All times are in minutes and seconds.

KEY:	q	Fastest non-qualifiers	Q	Qualified	GR	Games record	NR	National record	PB	Personal best	SB	Seasonal best

=== Heats ===
The first round was held on August 5.

Rank	Name	Nationality	Time	Notes
1	Staciana Stitts	United States	1:10.70	Q
2	Kristen Woodring	United States	1:11.71	Q
3	-	-	-	Q
4	-	-	-	Q
5	-	-	-	Q
6	-	-	-	Q
7	-	-	-	Q
8	-	-	-	Q

=== B Final ===
The B final was held on August 5.

Rank	Name	Nationality	Time	Notes
9	Tara Sloan	Canada	1:13.25	
10	Cerian Gibbes	Trinidad and Tobago	1:14.44	
11	Maria Ortiz	Colombia	1:15.25	
12	Valeria Silva	Peru	1:15.95	
13	Kenia Puertas	Venezuela	1:18.37	
14	Simne Kirton	Barbados	1:22.45	
15	Sherri Henry	Saint Lucia	1:22.69	
16	R.Encina	Paraguay	1:23.08	

=== A Final ===
The A final was held on August 5.

Rank	Name	Nationality	Time	Notes
1st place, gold medalist(s)	Staciana Stitts	United States	1:09.16	GR
2nd place, silver medalist(s)	Kristen Woodring	United States	1:09.65	
3rd place, bronze medalist(s)	Lauren van Oosten	Canada	1:10.06	
4	Mikeila Leyva	Cuba	1:12.48	
5	Imaday Núñez	Cuba	1:12.82	
6	Patrícia Comini	Brazil	1:13.10	
7	Isabel Ceballos	Colombia	1:13.29	
8	Adriana Marmolejo	Mexico	1:13.87	
