= Bodrogi =

Bodrogi is a surname of Hungarian origin. Notable people with this surname include:

- Gyula Bodrogi (born 1934) Hungarian television and film actor
- László Bodrogi (born 1976), Hungarian-French former professional road bicycle racer
- Viktor Bodrogi (born 1983), Hungarian swimmer

== See also ==
(
