= Viktor Saprykin =

Viktor Pavlovich Saprykin
Current position
- Title: Senior Coach
- Team: Russian National Swimming Team

Biographical details
- Born: October 12, 1955 (age 71); Omsk, Soviet Union
- Education: Omsk State Institute of Physical Culture

Accomplishments and honors

Awards
- Honored Coach of Russia
- Spouse: Tatyana Saprykin
- Children: 2

Viktor Pavlovich Saprykin (Russian: Виктор Павлович Сапрыкин; born 12 October 1955, Omsk, Soviet Union) is a Russian swimming coach. He holds the title of Honored Coach of Russia and has served as the Senior Coach of the Russia national swimming team since 2022.

== Biography ==
Viktor Saprykin was born in Omsk on 12 October 1955. After completing high school, he entered the Omsk State Institute of Physical Culture (now SibGUFK), where he specialized in competitive swimming.

He began his training at the Penguin swimming pool under coaches Vladimir Petrovich Volegov and Viktor Alekseevich Aikin. Following his graduation, he completed military service in a sports company in Kaliningrad.

Saprykin's coaching career includes:

- Senior coach at Omsk's School of Higher Sports Mastery
- Head specialist at the regional Olympic Reserve Sports School
- Technical director of the Youth Sports Academy "Albatross", where he trained 80% of his students

== Coaching career ==
Saprykin's coaching legacy includes:

=== Early career (1980s–2009) ===
- Trained Mikhail Yuzefovich (gold medalist, 1992 EJSC 1500 m freestyle)
- Prepared Vladislav Aminov (7th place, 2000 Sydney Olympics 200 m backstroke)
- Coached Svetlana Karpeeva (semi-finalist, 2004 Athens Olympics 100 m butterfly)

=== Volgograd period (2010–present) ===
As senior coach at Volga Swimming Club:

- 2012: Best Coach Award – Russian Swimming Cup (Kazan)
- 2013: Coaching Excellence Prize – Vladimir Salnikov Cup (Saint Petersburg)
- 2018–2024: 12 athletes qualified for World Aquatics Championships

=== Notable students ===
- Nikita Konovalov - Honored Master of Sports, World Champion, multiple European Champion
- Evgeny Koptelov - Master of Sports of Russia, International Class, multiple Universiade Champion
- Ivan Kuzmenko - Honored Master of Sports, World Champion and multiple European Champion
- Alexander Sadovnikov - Master of Sports of Russia, International Class, multiple Universiade Champion
- Vyacheslav Sinkevich - Master of Sports of Russia, International Class, World Championship medalist, multiple European Champion

== Family ==
Viktor Pavlovich’s family—his wife Tatyana, daughter Irina, son Alexey, and grandchildren Arina and Sergey—has consistently supported his commitment to coaching, understanding the demands of his profession, including frequent travel to training camps and competitions.
