= Inna Nikitina =

Ukrainian former swimmer (born 1982)

Personal information
- Full name: Inna Nikitina
- National team: Ukraine
- Born: 12 September 1982 (age 43) Kryvyi Rih, Ukrainian SSR, Soviet Union
- Height: 1.70 m (5 ft 7 in)
- Weight: 59 kg (130 lb)

Sport
- Sport: Swimming
- Strokes: Breaststroke
- Club: Dynamo Kryvyi Rih
- Coach: Viktor Zheltyakov

Inna Nikitina (Ukrainian: Інна Нікітіна; born 12 September 1982) is a Ukrainian former swimmer, who specialized in breaststroke events. She is a 2000 Olympian, a fourth-place finalist at the European Championships, and a multiple-time national age group champion. During her sporting career, Nikitina trained for Dynamo Kryvyi Rih's swim team under her longtime coach and mentor Viktor Zheltyakov.

Nikitina made her Olympic debut, as a 14-year-old teen, at the 1997 European Aquatics Championships in Seville, Spain, where she finished off the podium in the 200 m breaststroke with a fourth-place time of 2:29.76. The following year, at the 1998 FINA World Championships in Perth, Australia, Nikitina placed eighteenth from the prelims in the 200 m breaststroke at 2:33.18.

At the 2000 Summer Olympics in Sydney, Nikitina competed only in the women's 200 m breaststroke. She achieved a FINA B-cut of 2:33.39 from the Ukrainian Championships in Kyiv. She challenged seven other swimmers in heat two, including teenagers Nicolette Teo of Singapore (aged 14) and Siow Yi Ting (aged 16). Entering the race with a fastest entry time, Nikitina seized off a powerful lead at the final turn until she dropped her pace on the final stretch to a second seed in 2:34.20, almost a full second behind leader İlkay Dikmen of Turkey. Nikitina failed to advance into the semifinals, as she placed twenty-sixth overall in the prelims.
