= Jilen Siroky =

American swimmer

Personal information
- Full name: Jilen Christine Siroky
- National team: United States
- Born: November 20, 1981 (age 44) Winter Park, Florida, U.S.
- Height: 5 ft 3 in (1.60 m)
- Weight: 121 lb (55 kg)

Sport
- Sport: Swimming
- Strokes: Breaststroke
- Club: Mecklenburg Aquatics
- College team: University of Notre Dame

Jilen Christine Siroky (born November 20, 1981), also known by her married name Jilen Bouwer, is an American former competition swimmer who represented the United States at the 1996 Summer Olympics in Atlanta, Georgia. She competed in the B Final of the women's 200-meter breaststroke, and finished with the fifteenth overall time (2:33.43).

She now resides in the Chicago area with her husband Jason Bouwer and their children.

== See also ==
- List of University of Notre Dame alumni
