= Hannes Kalteis =

Austrian swimmer (born 1982)

Personal information
- Full name: Hannes Kalteis
- National team: Austria
- Born: 8 February 1982 (age 44) Sankt Pölten, Austria
- Height: 1.89 m (6 ft 2 in)
- Weight: 77 kg (170 lb)

Sport
- Sport: Swimming
- Strokes: Freestyle
- Club: ESV St. Pölten
Medal record
Men's swimming
Representing Austria
European Junior Championships
Gold medal – first place	2000 Dunkerque	1500 m freestyle

Hannes Kalteis (born 8 February 1982) is an Austrian former swimmer, who specialized in long-distance freestyle events. Kalteis upset local favorite Guy Noel Schmitt to take the gold in the 1500 m freestyle at the 2000 European Junior Swimming Championships in Dunkerque, France with a time of 15:21.41.

Kalteis qualified for two swimming events, as an 18-year-old, at the 2000 Summer Olympics in Sydney, by clearing a FINA A-standard entry time of 15:21.41 from the European Junior Championships. On the first day of the Games, Kalteis placed forty-second in the 400 m freestyle. Swimming in heat three, he rounded out the field to last place by almost seven seconds behind winner Torwai Sethsothorn of Thailand in 4:03.66. Nearly a week later, in the 1500 m freestyle, Kalteis challenged seven other swimmers in heat five, including U.S. swimmers and top medal favorites Erik Vendt and Chris Thompson. He finished the program's longest race in seventh place by less than 0.11 of a second behind Spain's Teo Edo in 15:32.90. Kalteis failed to advance into the final, as he placed twenty-fifth overall in the prelims.
