= Oksana Cherevko =

Kyrgyzstani swimmer

Personal information
- Born: 23 December 1979 (age 46)

Sport
- Sport: Swimming

Oksana Cherevko (born 23 December 1979) is a Kyrgyzstani swimmer. She competed in the women's 200 metre breaststroke event at the 1996 Summer Olympics. Her time in the competition was 2:57.65 in the hets. This time was the slowest time out of the 40 swimmers that completed the whole course.
