= Elvira Fischer =

Austrian swimmer (born 1978)

Personal information
- Full name: Elvira Fischer
- National team: Austria
- Born: 21 March 1978 (age 48) Vienna, Austria
- Height: 1.70 m (5 ft 7 in)
- Weight: 64 kg (141 lb)

Sport
- Sport: Swimming
- Strokes: Breaststroke
- Club: ESU Eisenstadt
- College team: University of Nebraska–Lincoln (1999–2000); University of California, Los Angeles (2000–2001)
- Coach: Paul Nelsen (U.S.); Cyndi Gallagher (U.S.)
Medal record
Women's swimming
Representing Austria
European Junior Championships
Bronze medal – third place	1992 Leeds	200 m breaststroke

Elvira Fischer (born March 21, 1978) is an Austrian former swimmer who specialized in breaststroke events. She represented Austria in two editions of the Olympic Games (1996 and 2000), and also held numerous Austrian records in a similar disciplinary double (both 100 and 200 m) until they were all broken by Mirna Jukić in the early 2000s. While studying in the United States, she received three All-American honors for the Nebraska Cornhuskers and later earned a 200-yard breaststroke title at the Pacific-10 Conference Championships, following her sudden transfer to the UCLA Bruins.

== Career ==
=== Early years ===
Fischer was born in Vienna, Austria, the daughter of Johann and Ruta Fischer. She began swimming at the very young age with ASV Wien, and later captured her first career medal, a bronze in the 200 m breaststroke (2:36.58) as a 14-year-old, at the 1992 European Junior Swimming Championships in Leeds, England.

=== College career ===
Fischer attended the University of Nebraska–Lincoln in Lincoln, Nebraska, where she played for the Nebraska Cornhuskers swimming and diving team, under head coach Paul Nelsen, from 1999 to 2001. While swimming for the Cornhuskers, she received three All-American honors, and posted career bests in the 100-yard breaststroke (1:01.83) and 200-yard breaststroke (2:12.46) at the 2001 NCAA Women's Swimming and Diving Championships. On that same year, Fischer transferred to the University of California, Los Angeles, where she took up a pre-med course and swam for the UCLA Bruins, coached by Cyndi Gallagher. During her senior season, she claimed the 200-yard breaststroke title (2:18.16) at the 2002 Pacific-10 Conference Championships. Because of her further success in college swimming, she was also named the Most Valuable Swimmer of the Year by the University.

=== International career ===
Fischer made her first Austrian team at the 1996 Summer Olympics in Atlanta. There, she failed to reach the top 16 final in the 200 m breaststroke, sharing a twenty-fourth seed with China's Yuan Yuan in a matching time of 2:33.89.

At the 1997 European Aquatics Championships in Seville, Spain, Fischer pulled off a fourteenth-place effort through a consolation final in the 200 m breaststroke at 2:34.03. The following year, at the 1998 FINA World Championships in Perth, Australia, she placed twenty-fourth from the prelims in the 200 m breaststroke with a time of 2:35.65.

Fischer competed in a breaststroke double at the 2000 Summer Olympics in Sydney. She achieved a FINA A-standard of 2:30.17 (200 m breaststroke) from the European Championships in Helsinki, Finland. On the second day of the Games, Fischer placed twenty-fourth in the 100 m breaststroke. Swimming in heat three, she held off a challenge from Colombia's Isabel Ceballos on the final stretch to a top finish in 1:11.58, almost half a second (0.50) closer to her entry standard. Three days later, in the 200 m breaststroke, Fischer established an Austrian record of 2:30.05 from heat four in the prelims, but missed the semifinals by six-tenths of a second (0.60) with a nineteenth-place effort.

At the 2001 FINA World Championships in Fukuoka, Japan, Fischer failed to medal in any of her individual events, finishing sixteenth in the 100 m breaststroke (1:11.18) and tenth in the 200 m breaststroke (2:28.71).

In November 2002, Fischer ended her sporting career because of health problems, specifically in her back muscles and lumbar spine.
