= Snowie Pang =

Hong Kong swimmer

Personal information
- Born: 26 August 1977 (age 48)

Sport
- Sport: Swimming

Snowie Pang (born 26 August 1977) is a Hong Kong swimmer. She competed in the women's 100 metre breaststroke event at the 1996 Summer Olympics.
