= Erika Graf =

Uruguayan swimmer

Erika Graf (born 10 August 1977) is a Uruguayan swimmer. She competed in the women's 200 metre breaststroke event at the 1996 Summer Olympics.
