= Riley Mants =

Canadian swimmer

Personal information
- Born: 25 October 1978 (age 47) Winnipeg, Manitoba, Canada

Sport
- Sport: Swimming

Riley Mants (born 25 October 1978) is a Canadian swimmer. She competed in the women's 200 metre breaststroke event at the 1996 Summer Olympics.
