= Brenda Starink =

Dutch swimmer

Personal information
- Born: 29 July 1974 (age 51) Rotterdam, Netherlands

Sport
- Sport: Swimming

Brenda Starink (born 29 July 1974) is a former backstroke swimmer from the Netherlands, who competed for her native country in two consecutive Summer Olympics, starting in 1996 in Atlanta, Georgia. She retired from the sport in 2001. Starink won a total number of sixteen Dutch titles on long course (50m) during her career.

== See also ==
- Dutch records in swimming
