= Irina Raevskaya =

Russian swimmer

Personal information
- Born: 18 September 1984 (age 41) Zarechny, Sverdlovsk Oblast, Russia
- Height: 1.78 m (5 ft 10 in)
- Weight: 58 kg (128 lb)

Sport
- Sport: Swimming
- Club: Volga Club

Irina Rayevskaya (Russian: Ирина Раевская; born 18 September 1984) is a Russian swimmer. She competed at the 2000 Summer Olympics in the 100 m and 200 m backstroke and finished in 29th and 19th place, respectively.
