= 1997 FINA Short Course World Championships – Women's 4 × 100 metre medley relay =

The finals and the qualifying heats of the Women's 4 × 100 metres Medley Relay event at the 1997 FINA Short Course World Championships were held on the last day of the competition, on Sunday 20 April 1997 in Gothenburg, Sweden.

== Finals ==
| Rank | Final | Time |
|---|---|---|
| | China; Lu Donghua; Hue Xue; Cai Huijue; Le Jingyi | 3:57.83 |
| | United States; Lia Oberstar; Amanda Beard; Misty Hyman; Jenny Thompson | 3:58.94 |
| | Australia; Meredith Smith; Kristy Ellem; Angela Kennedy; Sarah Ryan | 4:01.55 |
| 4. | Sweden | 4:02.42 |
| 5. | Germany | 4:03.06 |
| 6. | Denmark | 4:06.58 |
| 7. | Italy | 4:08.56 |
| — | Canada | DSQ |

== Qualifying heats ==
| Rank | HEATS RankING | Time |
|---|---|---|
| 1. | Australia | 4:04.38 |
| 2. | United States | 4:04.45 |
| 3. | Sweden | 4:04.69 |
| 4. | Germany | 4:05.89 |
| 5. | China | 4:07.77 |
| 6. | Canada | 4:08.43 |
| 7. | Denmark | 4:09.09 |
| 8. | Italy | 4:09.50 |
| 9. | Great Britain | 4:10.80 |
| 10. | Portugal | 4:14.12 |
| 11. | South Africa | 4:14.21 |
| 13. | Czech Republic | 4:21.02 |
| 14. | Mexico | 4:31.81 |

== See also ==
- 1996 Women's Olympic Games 4 × 100 m Medley Relay
- 1997 Women's European LC Championships 4 × 100 m Medley Relay
