= Jenna Street =

American former competition swimmer (born 1982)

Personal information
- Full name: Jenna Street
- National team: United States
- Born: July 3, 1982 (age 44) Johnson City, Tennessee

Sport
- Sport: Swimming
- Strokes: Breaststroke
- Club: Bolles Sharks
Medal record
Women's swimming
Representing United States
World Championships (LC)
Bronze medal – third place	1998 Perth	200 m breaststroke

Jenna Street (born July 3, 1982) is an American former competition swimmer who won a bronze medal in the 200-meter breaststroke event at the 1998 World Aquatics Championships.

She was born in Johnson City, Tennessee, but then moved to Jacksonville, Florida. She attended the Bolles School and the University of Florida.
