= Hayk Yeghiazaryan =

Armenian weightlifter

Hayk Yeghiazaryan (Armenian: Հայկ Եղիազարյան, born June 18, 1972, in Yerevan, Armenian SSR) is an Armenian retired weightlifter. He competed at the 1996 Summer Olympics in the men's 70 kg division.
