= Jorge Luis Ulibarri =

Spanish swimmer

Personal information
- Born: October 8, 1975 (age 51)

Sport
- Sport: Swimming

Jorge Luis Ulibarri (born 8 October 1975) is a Spanish former freestyle swimmer who competed in the 2000 Summer Olympics.
