= Jácint Simon =

Hungarian swimmer (born 1979)

Personal information
- Full name: Jácint Simon
- National team: Hungary
- Born: 4 February 1979 (age 47) Kecskemét, Hungary
- Height: 1.90 m (6 ft 3 in)
- Weight: 85 kg (187 lb)

Sport
- Sport: Swimming
- Strokes: Freestyle
- Club: Ferencvárosi Torna Club
- College team: University of Nevada, Las Vegas (U.S.)
- Coach: Csaba Sós; Jim Reitz (U.S.)

Jácint Simon (born February 4, 1979) is a Hungarian former swimmer, who specialized in middle-distance freestyle events. He represented Hungary at the 2000 Summer Olympics, and also trained for the swim team at Ferencvárosi Torna Club in Budapest under his longtime coach Csaba Sós.

Jácint attended the University of Nevada, Las Vegas, where he majored in business marketing and swam for the UNLV Rebels swimming and diving team, under head coach Jim Reitz, from 1998 to 2002. While swimming for the Rebels, he posted top-ten career bests in the 200-yard freestyle (1:36.27), 500-yard freestyle (4:21.19), and 1650-yard freestyle (15:41.93), all from the 2001 Mountain West Conference (MWC) Championships in Oklahoma City, Oklahoma. He also received a total of four All-American honors from the NCAA Men's Swimming and Diving Championships, and three successive MWC awards as the Men's Swimmer of the Year from 2000 to 2002. Gathering a laundry list of accomplishments in his college career, Jácint was among the seven former athletes, including Romanian swimmer Ioana Diaconescu, to be officially inducted to the UNLV Rebels Hall of Fame in 2012.

Jácint competed for Hungary in the men's 4×200 m freestyle relay at the 2000 Summer Olympics in Sydney. Teaming with Attila Czene, Zsolt Gáspár, and Bela Szabados in heat one, Jácint swam the third leg and recorded a split of 1:50.32, but the Hungarians missed the top 8 final by almost a full second with a tenth-place time of 7:24.48, worthy enough for a national record.
