= Federica Biscia =

Italian swimmer (born 1980)

Personal information
- National team: Italy
- Born: June 26, 1980 (age 46)

Sport
- Sport: Swimming
Medal record
Representing Italy
Summer Universiade
Gold medal – first place	2001 Beijing	400m individual medley
Mediterranean Games
Gold medal – first place	1997 Bari	200m breaststroke

Federica Biscia (born 26 June 1980) is an Italian former breaststroke and medley swimmer who competed in the 2000 Summer Olympics.
