= Arus Gyulbudaghyan =

Armenian diver

Personal information
- Born: 15 January 1979 (age 46); Yerevan, Armenian SSR

Sport
- Sport: Diving

Arus Gyulbudaghyan (Armenian: Արուսյակ Գյուլբուդաղյան; born 15 January 1979) is a female Armenian retired diver. She competed at the 1996 Summer Olympics in the women's 3 metre springboard.
