= Luca Gádorfalvi =

Hungarian windsurfer

Personal information
- Nationality: Hungary
- Born: 29 January 1976 (age 49)
- Height: 1.70 m (5 ft 7 in)
- Weight: 54 kg (119 lb)

Sport
- Sport: Windsurfing

Luca Gádorfalvi (born 29 January 1976) is a Hungarian windsurfer. She competed in the 2000 Summer Olympics. She is also the sister of Áron Gádorfalvi.
