= Ilya Nikitin =

Russian swimmer

Personal information
- Nationality: Russia
- Born: 1982 (age 43–44)

Sport
- Sport: Swimming
- Strokes: Freestyle
Medal record
Representing Russia
World Championships (SC)
Silver medal – second place	2002 Moscow	4x200m freestyle relay
Bronze medal – third place	2000 Athens	4x200m freestyle relay

Ilya Nikitin (born 1982) is a Russian swimmer who won a silver medal in 2002 FINA World Swimming Championships in Moscow, Russia for 4x200 metre freestyle.
