= Arsen Gevorgyan =

Armenian Olympic judoka

Arsen Gevorgyan (Armenian: Արսէն Գևորգյան, born June 1, 1975, in Yerevan, Armenian SSR) is an Armenian retired judoka who competed at the 1996 Summer Olympics. His cousin Armen Gevorgyan is a Belgian basketball player.
