= Anush Manukyan =

Armenian swimmer

Personal information
- Full name: Anush Manukyan
- Nationality: Armenia
- Born: February 7, 1970 (age 56) Yerevan, Armenian SSR, Soviet Union

Sport
- Sport: Swimming
- Strokes: Breaststroke
Medal record
Women's Swimming
Representing Armenia

Anush Manukyan (Armenian: Անուշ Մանուկյան, born February 7, 1970) is an Armenian retired swimmer. She competed at the 1996 Summer Olympics in the women's 100 metre breaststroke. She was the first woman to represent Armenia at the Olympics.
