= Caroline Foot =

British swimmer

Personal information
- Full name: Caroline Joy Foot
- National team: Great Britain
- Born: 14 March 1965 (age 61) London, England
- Height: 1.68 m (5 ft 6 in)
- Weight: 63 kg (139 lb; 9.9 st)

Sport
- Sport: Swimming
- Strokes: Butterfly
- Club: York City Baths Club
Medal record
Women's swimming
Representing Great Britain
European Championships (LC)
Bronze medal – third place	1997 Seville	4×100 m medley
Commonwealth Games
Silver medal – second place	1986 Edinburgh	100 m butterfly
Bronze medal – third place	1998 Kuala Lumpur	4×100 m medley

Caroline Joy Foot (born 14 March 1965) is an English former butterfly swimmer.

== Early life ==
Foot attended Millfield School.

== Swimming career ==
Foot represented Great Britain at two Summer Olympics: 1988 and 1996. She represented England and won a silver medal in the 100 metres butterfly, at the 1986 Commonwealth Games in Edinburgh, Scotland. Four years later she represented England in the same event, at the 1990 Commonwealth Games in Auckland, New Zealand. A third appearance resulted in 1998 when she participated in the 100 metres butterfly and the medley relay in which she won a bronze medal, at the 1998 Commonwealth Games.

She was a four times winner of the ASA National British Championships 100 metres butterfly (1986, 1995, 1997 and 1998). She also won the 50 metres butterfly title in 1997 and 2000.

A member of swimming club, York City Baths Club, she is known for winning the bronze medal at the 1997 European Championships (LC) in the women's 4×100-metre medley relay, alongside Sarah Price, Jaime King, and Karen Pickering.

== See also ==
- List of Commonwealth Games medallists in swimming (women)
