= Lauren van Oosten =

Canadian swimmer (born 1978)

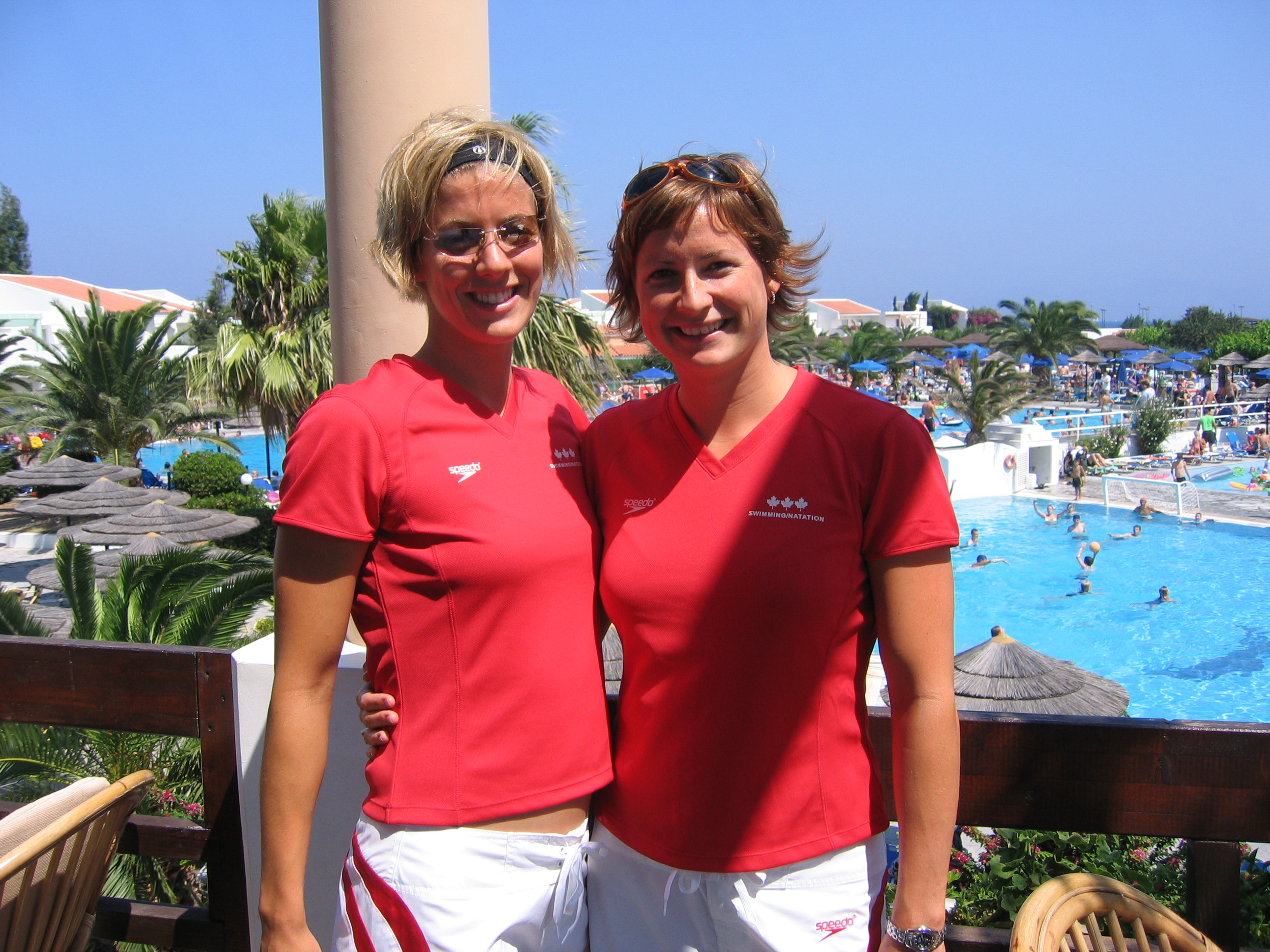
- Lauren van Oosten (right) and Liz Warden at Kos staging camp for 2004 Olympics

Personal information
- Full name: Lauren van Oosten
- National team: Canada
- Born: November 17, 1978 (age 47) Nanaimo, British Columbia
- Height: 1.70 m (5 ft 7 in)
- Weight: 64 kg (141 lb)

Sport
- Sport: Swimming
- Strokes: Breaststroke
- College team: University of Calgary
Medal record
Women's swimming
Representing Canada
World Championships (LC)
Bronze medal – third place	1998 Perth	100 m breaststroke
Commonwealth Games
Silver medal – second place	1998 Kuala Lumpur	4×100 m medley
Bronze medal – third place	1998 Kuala Lumpur	100 m breaststroke
Bronze medal – third place	1998 Kuala Lumpur	200 m breaststroke
Pan Pacific Championships
Bronze medal – third place	1997 Fukuoka	200 m breaststroke
Pan American Games
Gold medal – first place	1999 Winnipeg	200 m breaststroke
Silver medal – second place	1999 Winnipeg	4×100 m medley
Bronze medal – third place	1999 Winnipeg	100 m breaststroke

Lauren van Oosten (born November 17, 1978) is a Canadian former competition swimmer and a breaststroke specialist.

== Biography ==
She is originally from Nanaimo, British Columbia and is of Dutch heritage. She grew up and learned to swim in Nanaimo, before moving to the national training centre at the University of Calgary in Calgary, Alberta.

Lauren has been an integral part of the National Swim Team since 1997. Since then she has won a total of 9 international medals (bronze, silver and gold) and has set two Canadian records, one (200 m breaststroke) that still stands and one (100 m breaststroke) that lasted for six years (1998–2004). She attributes much of her success to her coach, Jan Bidrman.

Her first international meet was the Pan Pacific Swimming Championships in Fukuoka, Japan in August 1997. There she came from sixth place to third in the final 50 metres of the 200 m breaststroke race to win a bronze medal. This incredible performance qualified her for the 1998 World Aquatics Championships in Perth, Western Australia. At this World Championships Lauren swam a best time, set a Canadian record and won a bronze medal in the 100 m breaststroke with a time of 1:08:66.

From there she went to the 1998 Commonwealth Games that summer. This meet awarded her a silver medal (4*100 m medley relay) and 2 bronze medals (100 m breaststroke, 200 m breaststroke).

The 1999 Pan American Games were held in Winnipeg, Manitoba, from July 23 to August 8, 1999. Lauren won a medal in all the events she entered which included the 100-metre breaststroke (gold), 200-metre breaststroke (bronze), and 4*100-metre medley relay (silver).

Lauren had a major disappointment when she didn't make the Olympic team in 2000. Up until this point she had been ranked first in Canada, but was only able to manage a 5th-place finish at Olympic trials.

She also didn't make the World Championships team in 2001 or the Commonwealth Games team in 2002. She was in a nasty slump and fading out of the Canadian swimming picture. However the 2003 season proved to be a comeback year for van Oosten.

She qualified and raced at the 2003 World Aquatics Championships in Barcelona, Spain, where she swam in the 100 and 200-metre breaststroke events.

Then in November 2003, at Canadian Open in Quebec, van Oosten broke a 10-year-old national record in the women's 200-metre breaststroke to highlight the third day of competition, with a time of 2:25.47.

Following that she broke her Canadian record, only two months later, at the World Cup swimming competitions in East Meadow, New York. She won a bronze medal in the 200 metres and set a new time of 2:24.92.

In August 2004, van Oosten was disappointed with her races at the Olympics, compared to her performance at Olympic trials. At the 2004 Olympic Games, she competed in the 100-metre breaststroke (11th place), 200-metre breaststroke (13th place), and the 4×100-metre medley relay (11th place). Although she had thought she would retire after the Olympics, she felt that she had more in her and wasn't ready to retire just yet.

Early in 2005, she was hospitalized for pneumonia and was thought to be severely over trained. This proved to be quite a setback as it took her until the end of August to even be able to start training again. She had two and a half months to go from not training at all to being ready to win at Commonwealth Games trials. She did just that with a gold medal win in the 100-metre breaststroke, qualifying her for the 2006 Commonwealth Games in Melbourne, Australia. There Lauren won a bronze medal in the 4×*100-metre medley relay.

== 2004 Summer Olympics ==
Lauren van Oosten's 2004 Summer Olympics Events
Date	Event	Final Time	Place
August 15	100 m Breaststroke	1:09.45	11th
August 18	200 m Breaststroke	2:30.39	13th
August 21	4 × 100 m Medley Relay	4:09.84	11th

== See also ==
- List of Commonwealth Games medallists in swimming (women)
