= Viktor Bodrogi =

Hungarian swimmer (born 1983)

Personal information
- Full name: Viktor Bodrogi
- National team: Hungary
- Born: 28 December 1983 (age 42) Budapest, Hungary
- Height: 1.83 m (6 ft 0 in)
- Weight: 75 kg (165 lb)

Sport
- Sport: Swimming
- Strokes: Backstroke, butterfly
- Club: Százhalombattai Városi SC (HUN)
- College team: University of Southern California (U.S.)
- Coach: Dave Salo (U.S.)
Medal record
Men's swimming
Representing Hungary
European Junior Championships
Gold medal – first place	2000 Dunkerque	200 m backstroke
Gold medal – first place	2001 Valletta	50 m backstroke
Gold medal – first place	2001 Valletta	200 m backstroke
Silver medal – second place	2000 Dunkerque	100 m backstroke
Silver medal – second place	2000 Dunkerque	200 m butterfly
Silver medal – second place	2001 Valletta	200 m butterfly

Viktor Bodrogi (born 28 December 1983) is a Hungarian former swimmer, who specialized in backstroke and butterfly events. He is a two-time Olympian, a five-time All-American honoree, and a multiple-time Hungarian title and record holder in both backstroke and butterfly (50, 100, and 200). He also defended two titles in the same stroke (200 m) at the 2000 and 2001 European Junior Swimming Championships in Dunkerque, France, and in Valletta, Malta, respectively. Bodrogi is a former varsity swimmer for the USC Trojans under head coach Dave Salo, and a graduate of history and social sciences at the University of Southern California in Los Angeles.

Bodrogi's Olympic debut came as the youngest male swimmer (aged 16) for the Hungarian squad at the 2000 Summer Olympics in Sydney, competing in two swimming events. In the 200 m butterfly, Bodrogi placed twenty-fourth on the morning prelims. Swimming in heat three, he edged out Greece's Ioannis Drymonakos to take a second spot by a hundredth of a second (0.01) in 2:00.74. In his second event, 200 m backstroke, Bodrogi was disqualified from the fourth heat for passing and breaching the 15-metre start line during the race.

At the 2001 FINA World Championships in Fukuoka, Japan, Bodrogi cleared a two-minute barrier to lead a third fastest semifinal time and set a Hungarian record of 1:59.24 in the 200 m backstroke.

Bodrogi swam only for the 200 m backstroke at the 2004 Summer Olympics in Athens. He achieved a FINA A-standard of 2:00.13 from the national championships in Székesfehérvár. He challenged seven other swimmers in heat four, including British duo James Goddard and Gregor Tait. He rounded out the field to last place by more than half a second (0.50) behind New Zealand's Cameron Gibson in 2:03.16. Bodrogi failed to advance into the semifinals, as he placed twenty-fourth overall in the preliminaries.
