= Annamária Kiss =

Hungarian swimmer (born 1981)

Personal information
- Full name: Annamária Kiss
- National team: Hungary
- Born: 5 December 1981 (age 44) Dunaújváros, Hungary
- Height: 1.73 m (5 ft 8 in)
- Weight: 55 kg (121 lb)

Sport
- Sport: Swimming
- Strokes: Backstroke
- Club: Dunaferr SE
- Coach: Erzsébet Tóth

Annamária Kiss (born 5 December 1981) is a Hungarian former swimmer, who specialized in backstroke events. She represented Hungary in two editions of the Olympic Games (1996 and 2000), and also trained for Dunaferr Sports Club (Hungarian: Dunaferr Sportegyesület) under her longtime coach and mentor Erzsébet Tóth.

Kiss made her first Hungarian team, as a 14-year-old teen, at the 1996 Summer Olympics in Atlanta. There, she failed to reach the top 16 final in the 100 m backstroke, finishing only in thirty-second place at 1:07.38.

At the 2000 Summer Olympics in Sydney, Kiss competed only in three swimming events, including a backstroke double. She achieved FINA B-standards of 1:05.16 (100 m backstroke) and 2:17.08 (200 m backstroke) from the Hungarian Championships in Budapest.

On the second day of the Games, Kiss placed thirty-sixth in the 100 m backstroke. Swimming in heat two, she came up with a spectacular swim on the final stretch to race for the fourth seed in 1:06.12, just 1.13 seconds off the leading time set by Sweden's Camilla Johansson. Four days later, in the 200 m backstroke, Kiss posted a time of 2:20.40 to grab a sixth seed from the same heat, but finished only in twenty-eighth overall on the morning prelims. Kiss also teamed up with Ágnes Kovács, Gyöngyver Lakos, and newcomer Orsolya Ferenczy in the 4 × 100 m medley relay. Leading off a backstroke leg in heat one, Kiss recorded a split of 1:06.15, but the Hungarians raced to the fifth spot and thirteenth overall in a final time of 4:11.11.
