= Linda Hindmarsh =

English swimmer

Personal information
- Nationality: British
- Born: Q4 1980 Horsforth, City of Leeds

Sport
- Sport: Swimming
- Strokes: Breaststroke
- Club: City of Leeds SC

Linda Hindmarsh (born Q4, 1980) is a female former international swimmer from England and six times British champion.

== Swimming career ==
Hindmarsh is a six times British champion winning the ASA National British Championships over 200 metres breaststroke from 1996 to 1999 and twice champion over 100 metres in 1997 and 1999.

Hindmarsh represented England in the 100 and 200 metres breaststroke events, at the 1998 Commonwealth Games in Kuala Lumpur, Malaysia.
