= Britta Vestergaard =

Danish swimmer (born 1975)

Personal information
- Born: 22 May 1975 (age 51) Ringkøbing, Denmark

Sport
- Sport: Swimming

Britta Vestergaard (born 22 May 1975) is a Danish breaststroke, medley and freestyle swimmer. She competed at the 1992 Summer Olympics and the 1996 Summer Olympics.
