= Nataša Kejžar =

Slovenian swimmer

Personal information
- Full name: Nataša Kejžar
- Nationality: Slovenia
- Born: 14 October 1976 (age 49) Jesenice, Slovenia, Yugoslavia
- Height: 1.75 m (5 ft 9 in)
- Weight: 61 kg (134 lb)

Sport
- Sport: Swimming
- Strokes: Breaststroke and medley
- Club: Radovljica Park hotel Bled
Medal record
European Championships (SC)
Silver medal – second place	1998 Sheffield	100 m medley
Bronze medal – third place	1999 Lisbon	100 m medley

Nataša Kejžar (born 14 October 1976) is a swimmer for Slovenia at the 2000 Summer Olympics and a statistician.

Kejžar was born 14 October 1976 in Jesenice, Slovenia, Yugoslavia. Coached by Ciril Globočnik, she started swimming in 1984, finishing in 2000. As a competitor in swimming at the 2000 Summer Olympics, she made a national record for her time of 1:10.44 in the heats of the 100 m breaststroke, advancing into the semifinals but not to the final.

She studied at Faculty of Computer and Information Science, Ljubljana and achieved her PhD degree in Statistics in 2007. Since 2011 she has been employed at the Institute for Biostatistics and Medical Informatics of the University of Ljubljana. She is co-author with Douglas White, Constantino Tsallis, J. Doyne Farmer and Scott White of the social-circles network model.

== Publications ==
- "Generative Model for Feedback Networks" in Physical Review E, 016119 (2006, Douglas R. White, Nataša Kejžar, Constantino Tsallis, J. Doyne Farmer, Scott D. White). Reviewed 2005 in Europhysicsnews 36(6):218-220 by Stefan Thurner.
- Douglas R. White, Nataša Kejžar, and Laurent Tambayong. 2007. Discovering Oscillatory Dynamics of City-Size Distributions in World Historical Systems. Globalization as an Evolutionary Process: Modeling Global Change. Ed. by George Modelski, Tessaleno Devezas, and William R. Thompson. London: Routledge. ISBN 978-0-415-77361-4
