= Gyöngyvér Lakos =

Hungarian swimmer (born 1977)

Personal information
- Born: 1 June 1977 (age 49) Budapest, Hungary
- Height: 1.73 m (5 ft 8 in)
- Weight: 58 kg (128 lb)

Sport
- Sport: Swimming
- Club: Ferencvárosi Torna Club
Medal record
Women's swimming
Representing Hungary
European Championships
Silver medal – second place	1995 Vienna	4×100 m medley

Gyöngyvér Lakos (Hungarian: [ˈɟøɲɟveːr ˈlɒkoʃ]; born 1 June 1977) is a retired Hungarian freestyle swimmer who won a silver medal in the 4 × 100 m medley relay at the 1995 European Aquatics Championships. She also competed in the 50 m and 100 m freestyle and 4 × 100 m medley relay at the 1996 and 2000 Summer Olympics.

She was born in Budapest to László and Lászlóné Lakos and graduated from Ady Endre Gimnázium. Around 1997, she moved to the United States where she studied at the Purdue University, majoring in interior design, and competed in swimming. Meanwhile, she represented Hungary at the Summer Olympics.
