= Karine Brémond =

French swimmer

Personal information
- Born: 17 June 1975 (age 51) Aix-en-Provence, France
- Height: 1.74 m (5 ft 9 in)
- Weight: 58 kg (128 lb)

Sport
- Sport: Swimming
- Club: Istres Sports Nautique
Medal record
Representing France
European Championships
| Bronze medal – third place | 2000 Helsinki | 200 m breaststroke |

Karine Brémond (born 17 June 1975) is a retired French swimmer who won a bronze medal in the 200 m breaststroke at the 2000 European Aquatics Championships. She competed at the 1996 and 2000 Summer Olympics in the 4×100 m medley relay and 100 m and 200 m breaststroke events, but did not reach the finals.
