= Julia Russell =

South African swimmer

Personal information
- Born: 22 April 1975 (age 51)

Sport
- Sport: Swimming

Julia Russell (born 22 April 1975) is a South African swimmer. She competed in three events at the 1996 Summer Olympics.
