= Larisa Lăcustă =

Romanian swimmer

Personal information
- Full name: Larisa Elena Lăcustă
- Nationality: Romania
- Born: 24 October 1979 (age 47)
- Height: 1.80 m (5 ft 11 in)
- Weight: 74 kg (163 lb)

Sport
- Sport: Swimming
- Strokes: Freestyle
Medal record
FINA World Championships (SC)
Silver medal – second place	1997 Gothenburg	200 m breaststroke
European Championships (LC)
Bronze medal – third place	2004 Madrid	4×200 m freestyle

Larisa Lăcustă (born 24 October 1979) is a retired breaststroke and freestyle swimmer from Romania, who has competed in two Summer Olympics for her native country: in 1996 and 2004. She is best known for winning a silver medal at the 1997 FINA Short Course World Championships in Gothenburg, Sweden.
