= Vera Lischka =

Austrian swimmer (born 1977)

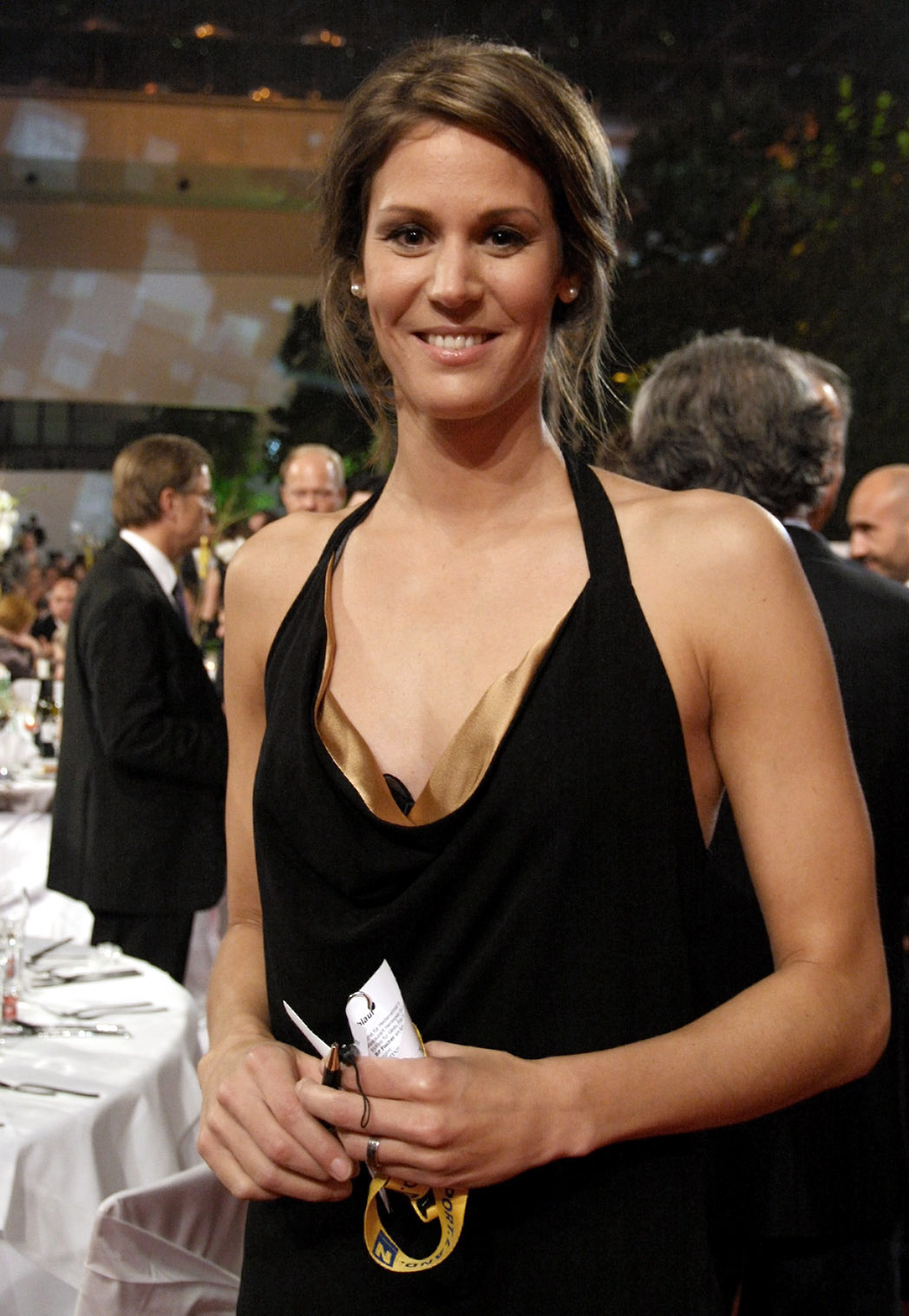

Medal record

Representing Austria

Women's swimming

European Championships (SC)
Gold medal – first place	1996 Rostock	50 m breaststroke
Silver medal – second place	1996 Rostock	100 m breaststroke
Silver medal – second place	1998 Sheffield	50 m breaststroke
Bronze medal – third place	2001 Antwerp	50 m breaststroke

Vera Lischka (born 1 May 1977 in Linz, Upper Austria) is a former breaststroke swimmer from Austria, who competed for her native country at the 1996 Summer Olympics in Atlanta, Georgia. At the European SC Championships 1996, she won the European title in the 50m Breaststroke.

Lischka won thirteen Austrian titles, and was trained by Rolf Gläser. After her swimming career she studied journalism. Since 27 October 2003, she is in the Landtag of Oberösterreich for the SPÖ.
