= Anne Poleska =

German swimmer (born 1980)

Personal information
- Full name: Anne Poleska
- Nationality: Germany
- Born: February 20, 1980 (age 46) Krefeld, Nordrhein-Westfalen, West Germany
- Height: 1.81 m (5 ft 11 in)
- Weight: 63 kg (139 lb)

Sport
- Sport: Swimming
- Strokes: Breaststroke
- Club: SG Krefeld, (Germany); Coral Springs Swim Club (Coral Springs, FL)
- College team: University of Alabama
- Coach: Eric McIlquham (Alabama); Michael Lohberg (Coral Springs)
Medal record
Women's swimming
Representing Germany
Olympic Games
Bronze medal – third place	2004 Athens	200 m breaststroke
World Championships (LC)
Silver medal – second place	2005 Montreal	200 m breaststroke
European Championships (LC)
Silver medal – second place	2002 Berlin	200 m breaststroke
European Championships (SC)
Gold medal – first place	1999 Lisbon	200 m breaststroke
Gold medal – first place	2001 Antwerp	100 m breaststroke
Gold medal – first place	2001 Antwerp	200 m breaststroke
Gold medal – first place	2004 Vienna	200 m breaststroke
Gold medal – first place	2005 Triest	200 m breaststroke
Silver medal – second place	2003 Dublin	200 m breaststroke
Silver medal – second place	2006 Helsinki	200 m breaststroke
Bronze medal – third place	1996 Rostock	200 m breaststroke
Bronze medal – third place	1998 Sheffield	200 m breaststroke
Bronze medal – third place	2002 Riesa	200 m breaststroke
Bronze medal – third place	2007 Debrecen	200 m breaststroke

Anne Poleska (born February 20, 1980) is a German breaststroke swimmer who swam for the University of Alabama, won five gold medals at the European championships, and competed in three Olympics from 2000-2008. She won a Bronze medal in her specialty, the 200-meter breaststroke competing for Germany in the 2004 Athens Olympics.

Poleska was born in Krefeld, Nordrhein-Westfalen, West Germany on February 20, 1980, and trained and competed with the SG Krefeld Swim Club in her hometown.

After 1999, and intermittently throughout the following decade, Poleska trained at Coral Springs's Aquatic Complex in South Florida, where she would later swim with American Olympic swimmer Dara Torres and five other 2008 Beijing Olympians. To follow German Olympic guidelines, Poleska swam as an "unattached" swimmer during this period to remain eligible to compete for Germany. At Coral Springs, where she became a resident in 2005, she was trained by six-time Olympic Coach Michael Lohberg, originally a native of Germany. After his death, the Coral Springs Aquatic Complex was named in Lohberg's honor.

== University of Alabama ==
Poleska attended and swam for the University of Alabama through around 2006 under Head Coach Eric McIlquham and women's Assistant Head Coach Sonya Porter. She also spent some time being mentored at Alabama through 2003 by Associate coach Arthur Albiero, who would later coach the University of Louisville and send many of his swimmers to the Olympics. At Alabama, she was their first swimming competitor to earn an Olympic medal in an individual event since the 1984 Games. She was the runner-up in the 200 breaststroke at the 2003 NCAA Championships. During her tenure at Alabama, she won five Southeastern Conference breaststroke titles, and held the SEC record in the 200 breaststroke. Poleska set Alabama school records in six individual swim events and helped set records in all of the swim events performed as relays.

== International competition ==
At the European Championships, she won the silver medal in the 200-meter breaststroke in 2002 in Berlin. She captured two gold medals at the 2004 Vienna and 2005 Triest European Short-Course Championships in the 200-meter breaststroke. Poleska won two additional silver medals in 2003 Dublin and 2006 Helsinki European Championships in the 200-meter breaststroke, and two bronze medals at the 2002 Riesa and 2007 Debrecen European Championships in the 200-meter breaststroke. In total, she also won 14 German national titles. Poleksa placed 2nd at the 2005 World Championships in Montreal, Canada.

As noted earlier, as a senior at Alabama in December 2004, Poleska dominated the competition to win the 200 meter breaststroke at the 2004 European Championship in Vienna, Austria, touching out Austria's Mirna Jukic. She stayed close to Jukic and then passed her in the third fifty meters. Poleska won the race by a full second, finishing with a time of 2:21.79.

Poleska married German rower and 2004 Olympian Jochen Urban.

== Olympics 2000-2008 ==
She won a bronze medal at the Athens 2004 Summer Olympics in the 200-meter backstroke with a time of 2:25.82, with American Amanda Beard taking the gold and Australian Leisel Jones taking the silver.

Poleksa competed in the 2000 Sydney Olympic games in the 200-meter breaststroke finishing 12th with a time of 2:28.99 and in the 2008 Olympic Games finishing tenth in the 200-meter breaststroke with a time of 2:26.71. In 2008, the German team coach was Oerjan Madsen.

== Honors ==
Poleska was a recipient of the Silver Bay Leaf, Germany’s premier award in sports, and was made a member of the University of Alabama Athletic Hall of Fame.
