= Svitlana Bondarenko =

Ukrainian swimmer (born 1971)

Personal information
- Full name: Світлана Бондаренко
- Nationality: Ukraine
- Born: 12 August 1971 (age 54) Zaporizhzhia
- Height: 5 ft 9 in (175 cm)
- Weight: 139 lb (63 kg)

Sport
- Sport: Swimming
- Strokes: breaststroke
- Club: Spartak
Medal record
Event	1st	2nd	3rd
World Championships (SC)	0	2	1
European Championships (LC)	1	9	2
European Championships (SC)	0	0	1
Summer Universiade	2	2	0
Military World Games	1	3	4
Total	4	16	8
World Championships (SC)
Silver medal – second place	1995 Rio	100 m breaststroke
Silver medal – second place	1995 Rio	200 m breaststroke
Bronze medal – third place	1997 Gothenburg	100 m breaststroke
European Championships (LC)
Gold medal – first place	2004 Madrid	100 m breaststroke
Silver medal – second place	1991 Athens	100 m breaststroke
Silver medal – second place	1993 Sheffield	100 m breaststroke
Silver medal – second place	1995 Vienna	100 m breaststroke
Silver medal – second place	1995 Vienna	200 m breaststroke
Silver medal – second place	1997 Seville	100 m breaststroke
Silver medal – second place	1999 Istanbul	100 m breaststroke
Silver medal – second place	2002 Berlin	50 m breaststroke
Silver medal – second place	2002 Berlin	100 m breaststroke
Silver medal – second place	2004 Madrid	4×100 m medley
Bronze medal – third place	2000 Helsinki	100 m breaststroke
Bronze medal – third place	2002 Berlin	4×100 m medley
European Championships (SC)
Bronze medal – third place	1998 Sheffield	100 m breaststroke
Summer Universiade
Gold medal – first place	1993 Buffalo	200 m breaststroke
Gold medal – first place	1997 Catania	100 m breaststroke
Silver medal – second place	1993 Buffalo	100 m breaststroke
Silver medal – second place	1997 Catania	200 m breaststroke
Military World Games
Gold medal – first place	1999 Zagreb	100 m breaststroke
Silver medal – second place	1999 Zagreb	50 m breaststroke
Silver medal – second place	2003 Catania	50 m breaststroke
Silver medal – second place	2003 Catania	100 m breaststroke
Bronze medal – third place	2003 Catania	200 m breaststroke
Bronze medal – third place	2007 Hyderabad	50 m breaststroke
Bronze medal – third place	2007 Hyderabad	4x400 m medley relay
Bronze medal – third place	2011 Rio de Janeiro	100 m breaststroke
World Military Championships
Silver medal – second place	2010 Warendorf	100 m breaststroke
Bronze medal – third place	2010 Warendorf	50 m breaststroke

Svitlana Bondarenko (Ukrainian: Світлана Бондаренко; born 12 August 1971 in Zaporizhzhia) is a former international breaststroke swimmer from Ukraine. She swam at three Olympics (1996, 2000 and 2004), multiple World Championships and European Championships, and several other meets during her international career from 1991 to 2010.

In the 1990s, she was the silver-medalist in the 100 Breaststroke at every European Championships (1991, 1993, 1995, 1997 and 1999), and also won silver in the 200 Breaststroke in 1995. At the 1995 Short Course Worlds, she garnered silver medals in both breaststroke events (100 and 200).

In the 2000s, at the 2004 European Championships, she won the 100 Breaststroke.

Bondarenko was the oldest contender at the 2010 European Championships.
