= Isabel Ceballos =

Colombian swimmer (born 1979)

Personal information
- Full name: Isabel Cristina Ceballos Rojas
- Born: February 3, 1979 (age 47)

Sport
- Sport: Swimming
- Strokes: Breaststroke

Isabel Cristina Ceballos Rojas (born February 3, 1979) is an Olympic breaststroke swimmer from Colombia. She swam for Colombia at the 1996 and 2000 Olympics.

At the 2000 Olympics, she set Colombian records in the 100 and 200 breaststroke (1:11.90 and 2:34.09).

She swam for Colombia at the:

- 2000 Olympics
- 1999 Pan American Games
- 1998 World Championships
- 1998 Central American & Caribbean Games
- 1996 Olympics
- 1993 Central American & Caribbean Games
