= Madelon Baans =

Dutch swimmer (born 1977)

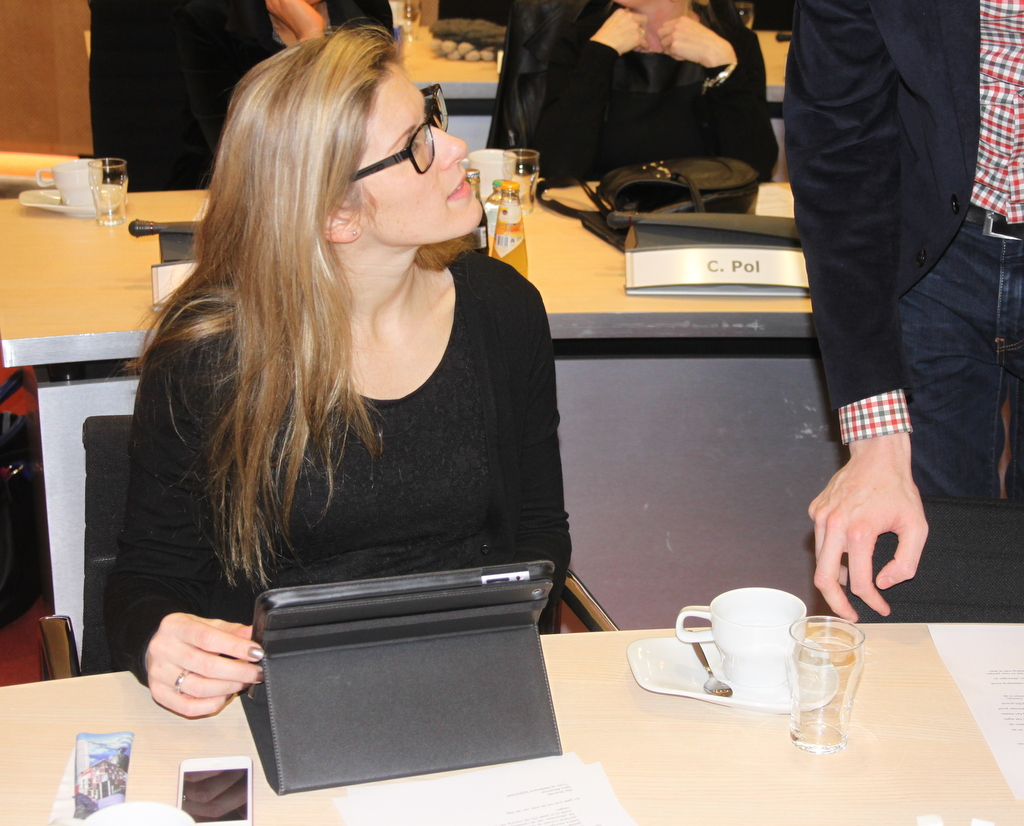
- Madelon Baans in 2013.

Personal information
- Born: 8 October 1977 (age 48) Rotterdam
Medal record
Representing Netherlands
Women's swimming
European Championships (LC)
Bronze medal – third place	2004 Madrid	4×100 m medley

Madelon Baans (born 8 October 1977 in Rotterdam) is a retired female breaststroke swimmer from the Netherlands, who competed for her native country in three consecutive Summer Olympics, starting in 1996 in Atlanta, Georgia. She made her last international appearance at the European Short Course Swimming Championships 2005 in Trieste, Italy.

Baans is 49 time Dutch national champion (24 on long course), current Dutch national record holder at the 100 m breaststroke in both the short course (25 m) and long course (50 m). During the 2004 European Championships in Madrid, she won the bronze medal as part of the 4×100 m medley. In the same year she reached the final at the 2004 Summer Olympics in the same discipline. She announced her retirement in November 2006.

== See also ==
- List of Dutch records in swimming
