= Brigitte Becue =

Belgian swimmer (born 1972)

Personal information
- Full name: Brigitte Becue
- Nationality: Belgian
- Born: 18 November 1972 (age 53) Ostend

Sport
- Sport: Swimming
- Strokes: breaststroke, medley
Medal record
Women's swimming
Representing Belgium
World Championships (LC)
Bronze medal – third place	1994 Rome	200 m breaststroke
European Championships (LC)
Gold medal – first place	1993 Sheffield	200 m breaststroke
Gold medal – first place	1995 Vienna	100 m breaststroke
Gold medal – first place	1995 Vienna	200 m breaststroke
Silver medal – second place	1989 Bonn	200 m breaststroke
Silver medal – second place	1995 Vienna	200 m medley
Silver medal – second place	2000 Helsinki	4×100 m medley
Bronze medal – third place	1997 Seville	100 m breaststroke
Bronze medal – third place	1997 Seville	200 m breaststroke
Bronze medal – third place	1999 Istanbul	100 m breaststroke
European Championships (SC)
Gold medal – first place	1998 Sheffield	100 m breaststroke
Gold medal – first place	1999 Lisbon	100 m breaststroke
Bronze medal – third place	1999 Lisbon	200 m breaststroke

Brigitte Becue (born 18 September 1972) is a retired breaststroke and medley swimmer from Belgium, who competed for her native country at four consecutive Summer Olympic Games, starting in 1988. In 1989, she won the silver medal in the women's 200 metres breaststroke at the European Aquatics Championships in Bonn, West Germany.

Becue reached her highest peak at the 1995 European Aquatics Championships in Vienna, where she won three medals (two gold, one silver). She twice was named Belgian Sportswoman of the Year (1994 and 1995).

Becue finished 10th overall in the 2007 Dakar Rally as co-driver of Stéphane Henrard.
