= Alicja Pęczak =

Polish swimmer

Personal information
- Full name: Alicja Iwona Pęczak-Graczyk
- Nationality: Poland
- Born: 13 January 1970 (age 56) Bydgoszcz, Kuyavian-Pomeranian
- Height: 1.68 m (5 ft 6 in)

Sport
- Sport: Swimming
- Strokes: medley and breaststroke
- Club: Astoria Bydgoszcz; AZS-AWF Gdańsk
Medal record
Women's swimming
Representing Poland
Event	1st	2nd	3rd
World Championships (SC)	0	2	2
European Championships (LC)	0	1	3
European Championships (SC)	5	2	3
Summer Universiade	0	1	0
Total	5	6	8
World Championships (SC)
Silver medal – second place	2000 Athens	100 m breaststroke
Silver medal – second place	2000 Athens	200 m breaststroke
Bronze medal – third place	1995 Rio	200 m breaststroke
Bronze medal – third place	1997 Gothenburg	200 m breaststroke
European Championships (LC)
Silver medal – second place	1997 Seville	200 m breaststroke
Bronze medal – third place	1995 Vienna	200 m breaststroke
Bronze medal – third place	1995 Vienna	200 m medley
Bronze medal – third place	1999 Istanbul	200 m breaststroke
European Championships (SC)
Gold medal – first place	1996 Rostock	200 m breaststroke
Gold medal – first place	1998 Sheffield	100 m breaststroke
Gold medal – first place	1998 Sheffield	200 m breaststroke
Gold medal – first place	1998 Sheffield	200 m medley
Gold medal – first place	2000 Valencia	100 m breaststroke
Silver medal – second place	1996 Rostock	200 m medley
Silver medal – second place	2000 Valencia	200 m breaststroke
Bronze medal – third place	1992 Espoo	50 m breaststroke
Bronze medal – third place	1992 Espoo	100 m medley
Bronze medal – third place	1996 Rostock	100 m breaststroke
Summer Universiade
Silver medal – second place	1991 Sheffield	200 m medley

Alicja Pęczak (born 13 January 1970 in Bydgoszcz, Kuyavian-Pomeranian) is a retired breaststroke and medley swimmer from Poland, who competed in two consecutive Summer Olympics for her native country: in 1992 and 1996. A member of Astoria Bydgoszcz and AZS-AWF Gdańsk, she is best known for winning several medals at the FINA Short Course World Championships.

Pęczak was banned for 18 months because of doping use.
