= Jaime King (swimmer) =

British swimmer

Personal information
- Full name: Jaime Anne King
- National team: Great Britain
- Born: 18 December 1976 (age 49) Swindon, England
- Height: 1.68 m (5 ft 6 in)
- Weight: 55 kg (121 lb; 8.7 st)

Sport
- Sport: Swimming
- Strokes: Breaststroke
- Club: Thamesdown Tigersharks
Medal record
Women's swimming
Representing Great Britain
European Championships (LC)
Bronze medal – third place	1993 Sheffield	4×100 m medley
Bronze medal – third place	1997 Seville	4×100 m medley
European Championships (SC)
Bronze medal – third place	1998 Sheffield	50 m breaststroke
Representing England
Commonwealth Games
Bronze medal – third place	1998 Kuala Lumpur	medley relay

Jaime Anne King (born 18 December 1976) is a female English former competitive swimmer.

== Swimming career ==
King represented Great Britain at three consecutive Summer Olympics, starting in 1992.

She is best known for winning the bronze medal at the 1997 European Championships (long course) in the women's 4×100-metre medley relay, alongside Sarah Price, Caroline Foot and Karen Pickering. She represented England and won a bronze medal in the 4 x 100 metres medley relay event, at the 1998 Commonwealth Games in Kuala Lumpur, Malaysia.

At the ASA National British Championships she won the 50 metres breaststroke in 1998, the 100 metres breaststroke title four times (1993, 1998, 2001, 2003) and the 200 metres breaststroke title three times (2001, 2002, 2003).
