= Swimming at the 1997 European Aquatics Championships – Women's 50 metre freestyle =

The final of the Women's 50 metres Freestyle event at the European LC Championships 1997 was held on Sunday 24 August 1997 in Seville, Spain.

== Finals ==
RANK	FINAL A	TIME
	Natalya Meshcheryakova (RUS)	25.31
	Sandra Völker (GER)	25.43
	Therese Alshammar (SWE)	25.78
4.	Simone Osygus (GER)	25.84
5.	Angela Postma (NED)	25.89
6.	Metka Šparovec (SLO)	26.03
6.	Olga Mukomol (UKR)	26.03
8.	Tine Bossuyt (BEL)	26.43

RANK	FINAL B	TIME
9.	Wilma van Hofwegen (NED)	26.06
10.	Claudia Franco (ESP)	26.08
11.	Inna Yaitskaya (RUS)	26.18
12.	Sue Rolph (GBR)	26.36
13.	Viviana Susin (ITA)	26.38
14.	Laura Petrutyte (LTU)	26.40
15.	Cristina Chiuso (ITA)	26.45
16.	Judith Draxler (AUT)	26.58

== Qualifying heats ==
RANK	HEATS RANKING	TIME
1.	Sandra Völker (GER)	25.30
2.	Natalya Meshcheryakova (RUS)	25.31
3.	Simone Osygus (GER)	25.61
4.	Therese Alshammar (SWE)	25.95
5.	Metka Šparovec (SLO)	26.00
5.	Olga Mukomol (UKR)	26.00
7.	Angela Postma (NED)	26.02
8.	Tine Bossuyt (BEL)	26.04
9.	Wilma van Hofwegen (NED)	26.06
10.	Claudia Franco (ESP)	26.24
11.	Sue Rolph (GBR)	26.25
12.	Judith Draxler (AUT)	26.38
13.	Laura Petrutyte (LTU)	26.45
14.	Viviana Susin (ITA)	26.49
15.	Cristina Chiuso (ITA)	26.53
15.	Inna Yaitskaya (RUS)	26.53
17.	Ivana Walterová (SVK)	26.54
18.	Dita Zelviene (LTU)	26.55
19.	Fabienne Dufour (BEL)	26.59
19.	Marja Pärssinen (FIN)	26.59
19.	Urska Slapsak (SLO)	26.59
22.	Blanca Cerón (ESP)	26.60
23.	Liliana Dobrescu (ROM)	26.71
24.	Karen Pickering (GBR)	26.81
25.	Minna Salmela (FIN)	26.83
26.	Dominique Diezi (SUI)	26.95
27.	Nicole Zahnd (SUI)	27.01
28.	Mia Muusfeldt (DEN)	27.15
29.	Lara Heinz (LUX)	27.17
30.	Katalin Revesz (HUN)	27.22
31.	Ditte Jensen (DEN)	27.56
32.	Elin Sigurdardottir (ISL)	27.70
33.	Agnese Ozolina (LAT)	27.74
34.	Chantal Gibney (IRL)	27.86

== See also ==
- 1996 Women's Olympic Games 50m Freestyle
- 1997 Women's World Championships (SC) 50m Freestyle
