= Swimming at the 1997 European Aquatics Championships – Women's 100 metre freestyle =

The final of the Women's 100 metres Freestyle event at the European LC Championships 1997 was held on Tuesday 19 August 1997 in Seville, Spain.

== Finals ==
RANK	FINAL A	TIME
	Sandra Völker (GER)	55.38
	Martina Moravcová (SVK)	55.46
	Antje Buschschulte (GER)	55.50
4.	Sue Rolph (GBR)	56.09
5.	Karen Pickering (GBR)	56.13
6.	Natalya Meshcheryakova (RUS)	56.15
7.	Mette Jacobsen (DEN)	56.51
7.	Wilma van Hofwegen (NED)	56.51

RANK	FINAL B	TIME
9.	Svetlana Leshukova (RUS)	56.65
10.	Olga Mukomol (UKR)	56.87
10.	Claudia Franco (ESP)	56.87
12.	Therese Alshammar (SWE)	57.04
13.	Olena Lapunova (UKR)	57.22
14.	Minna Salmela (FIN)	57.34
15.	Metka Šparovec (SLO)	57.37
16.	Liliana Dobrescu (ROM)	59.84

== Qualifying heats ==
RANK	HEATS RANKING	TIME
1.	Sandra Völker (GER)	55.46
2.	Martina Moravcová (SVK)	55.76
3.	Antje Buschschulte (GER)	55.95
4.	Natalya Meshcheryakova (RUS)	55.99
5.	Karen Pickering (GBR)	56.46
6.	Sue Rolph (GBR)	56.57
7.	Mette Jacobsen (DEN)	56.66
8.	Wilma van Hofwegen (NED)	56.76
9.	Svetlana Leshukova (RUS)	56.97
10.	Liliana Dobrescu (ROM)	57.15
11.	Claudia Franco (ESP)	57.21
12.	Olena Lapunova (UKR)	57.31
13.	Olga Mukomol (UKR)	57.32
14.	Metka Šparovec (SLO)	57.46
15.	Minna Salmela (FIN)	57.55
16.	Therese Alshammar (SWE)	57.70
17.	Laura Petrutyte (LTU)	57.91
18.	Ioana Diaconescu (ROM)	57.93
19.	Nicole Zahnd (SUI)	58.05
20.	Viviana Susin (ITA)	58.07
21.	Dita Zelviene (LTU)	58.10
22.	Liesbeth Dreesen (BEL)	58.26
23.	Mia Muusfeldt (DEN)	58.30
24.	Katalin Revesz (HUN)	58.42
25.	Dominique Diezi (SUI)	58.47
26.	Fátima Madrid (ESP)	58.55
27.	Marja Pärssinen (FIN)	58.62
28.	Judith Draxler (AUT)	58.63
29.	Urska Slapsak (SLO)	58.68
30.	Ivana Walterová (SVK)	58.87
31.	Anna-Karin Kammerling (SWE)	58.97
32.	Fabienne Dufour (BEL)	59.08
33.	Lara Heinz (LUX)	59.40
34.	Chantal Gibney (IRL)	59.61
35.	Liliana Dobrescu (ROM)	59.84
36.	Agnese Ozolina (LAT)	59.90

== See also ==
- 1996 Women's Olympic Games 100m Freestyle
- 1997 Women's World Championships (SC) 100m Freestyle
