= Swimming at the 1998 World Aquatics Championships – Women's 50 metre freestyle =

Women's 50 metre freestyle at the 1998 FINA World Championships
- Date: 18 January 1998
- Winning time: 25.15 seconds

Medalists
gold medal	Amy Van Dyken	United States
silver medal	Sandra Völker	Germany
bronze medal	Shan Ying	China

The finals and the qualifying heats of the women's 50 metre freestyle event at the 1998 World Aquatics Championships were held on Sunday 18 January 1998 in Perth, Western Australia.

== A Final ==
Rank	Name	Time
Gold medal	Amy Van Dyken (USA)	25.15
Silver medal	Sandra Völker (GER)	25.32
Bronze medal	Shan Ying (CHN)	25.36
4	Jenny Thompson (USA)	25.59
5	Angela Postma (NED)	25.67
6	Therese Alshammar (SWE)	25.83
7	Simone Osygus (GER)	25.90
8	Martina Moravcová (SVK)	26.04

== B Final ==
Rank	Name	Time
9	Sumika Minamoto (JPN)	25.99
10	Rania Elwani (EGY)	26.05
12	Rebecca Creedy (AUS)	26.09
12	Wilma van Hofwegen (NED)	26.09
12	Yevgeniya Yermakova (KAZ)	26.09
14	Claudia Franco (ESP)	26.14
15	Sue Rolph (GBR)	26.19
15	Leah Martindale (BAR)	26.19

== See also ==
- 1996 Women's Olympic Games 50m Freestyle (Atlanta)
- 1997 Women's World SC Championships 50m Freestyle (Gothenburg)
- 1997 Women's European LC Championships 50m Freestyle (Seville)
- 2000 Women's Olympic Games 50m Freestyle (Sydney)
