= Swimming at the 1997 European Aquatics Championships – Women's 200 metre freestyle =

The final of the Women's 200 metres Freestyle event at the European LC Championships 1997 was held on Wednesday 20 August 1997 in Seville, Spain.

== Finals ==
RANK	FINAL A	TIME
	Michelle Smith (IRL)	1:59.93
	Nadezhda Chemezova (RUS)	1:59.97
	Camelia Potec (ROM)	2:00.17
4.	Martina Moravcová (SVK)	2:00.34
5.	Kerstin Kielgass (GER)	2:00.36
6.	Karen Pickering (GBR)	2:01.02
7.	Olena Lapunova (UKR)	2:01.11
8.	Josefin Lillhage (SWE)	2:01.46

RANK	FINAL B	TIME
9.	Antje Buschschulte (GER)	2:01.11
10.	Liliana Dobrescu (ROM)	2:01.85
11.	Victoria Horner (GBR)	2:03.37
12.	Nicole Zahnd (SUI)	2:03.49
13.	Laura Roca (ESP)	2:04.53
14.	Solenne Figuès (FRA)	2:04.70
15.	Mia Muusfeldt (DEN)	2:05.21
16.	Tanja Blatnik (SLO)	2:05.26

== Qualifying heats ==
RANK	HEATS RANKINGS	TIME
1.	Nadezhda Chemezova (RUS)	2:00.44
2.	Kerstin Kielgass (GER)	2:00.61
3.	Martina Moravcová (SVK)	2:00.76
4.	Olena Lapunova (UKR)	2:01.02
5.	Josefin Lillhage (SWE)	2:02.05
6.	Camelia Potec (ROM)	2:02.12
7.	Michelle Smith (IRL)	2:02.15
7.	Karen Pickering (GBR)	2:02.15
9.	Liliana Dobrescu (ROM)	2:02.18
10.	Mette Jacobsen (DEN)	2:02.20
11.	Antje Buschschulte (GER)	2:02.53
12.	Johanna Sjöberg (SWE)	2:03.14
13.	Solenne Figuès (FRA)	2:03.79
14.	Victoria Horner (GBR)	2:04.15
15.	Mia Muusfeldt (DEN)	2:04.64
16.	Laura Roca (ESP)	2:04.67
17.	Tanja Blatnik (SLO)	2:05.30
18.	Nicole Zahnd (SUI)	2:06.06
19.	Petra Banović (CRO)	2:07.25
20.	Yvetta Hlaváčová (CZE)	2:07.34
21.	Silvia Soronellas (ESP)	2:07.79
22.	Ivana Walterová (SVK)	2:07.88
23.	Chantal Gibney (IRL)	2:08.07
24.	Patricia Stokkers (NED)	2:09.18
25.	Agnese Ozolina (LAT)	2:09.98

== See also ==
- 1996 Women's Olympic Games 200m Freestyle
- 1997 Women's World Championships (SC) 200m Freestyle
