= 1997 FINA Short Course World Championships – Women's 100m freestyle =

The finals and the qualifying heats of the women's 100 metres freestyle event at the 1997 FINA Short Course World Championships were held on the first day of the competition, on Thursday 17 April 1997 in Gothenburg, Sweden.

== Finals ==
RANK	FINAL A	TIME
	Jenny Thompson (USA)	53.46
	Sandra Völker (GER)	53.50
	Le Jingyi (CHN)	53.72
4.	Martina Moravcová (SVK)	54.04
5.	Shan Ying (CHN)	54.31
6.	Sue Rolph (GBR)	54.43
7.	Katrin Meissner (GER)	54.91
8.	Therese Alshammar (SWE)	55.18

RANK	FINAL B	TIME
9.	Lindsey Farella (USA)	55.14
10.	Sarah Ryan (AUS)	55.33
11.	Laura Nicholls (CAN)	55.82
12.	Luminița Dobrescu (ROM)	55.83
13.	Dita Zelviene (LTU)	55.98
14.	Judith Draxler (AUT)	56.05
15.	Claire Huddart (GBR)	56.19
16.	Leah Martindale (BAR)	56.20

== Qualifying heats ==
RANK	HEATS RANKING	TIME
1.	Jenny Thompson (USA)	53.94
2.	Sandra Völker (GER)	53.96
3.	Le Jingyi (CHN)	54.54
4.	Martina Moravcová (SVK)	54.70
5.	Shan Ying (CHN)	54.80
6.	Sue Rolph (GBR)	55.03
7.	Katrin Meissner (GER)	55.15
8.	Therese Alshammar (SWE)	55.18
9.	Lindsey Farella (USA)	55.43
10.	Sarah Ryan (AUS)	55.60
11.	Laura Nicholls (CAN)	55.83
12.	Leah Martindale (BAR)	55.99
13.	Claire Huddart (GBR)	56.02
14.	Luminița Dobrescu (ROM)	56.14
15.	Judith Draxler (AUT)	56.23
16.	Dita Zelviene (LTU)	56.24
17.	Natalya Meshcheryakova (RUS)	56.25
18.	Ioana Diaconescu (ROM)	56.28
19.	Louise Jöhncke (SWE)	56.33
20.	Julia Greville (AUS)	56.43
21.	Siobhan Cropper (TRI)	56.44
22.	Charlene Wittstock (RSA)	56.82
23.	Viviana Susin (ITA)	56.82
24.	Alena Popchanka (BLR)	56.95
25.	Christine Cech (RSA)	57.16
26.	Michelle Cruz (CAN)	57.55
27.	Sandrine Paquier (SUI)	58.00

== See also ==
- 1996 Women's Olympic Games 100m Freestyle
- 1997 Women's European LC Championships 100m Freestyle
