= Swimming at the 1998 World Aquatics Championships – Women's 100 metre freestyle =

Women's 100 metre freestyle at the 1998 FINA World Championships
- Date: 18 January 1998
- Winning time: 54.95 seconds

Medalists
gold medal	Jenny Thompson	United States
silver medal	Martina Moravcová	Slovakia
bronze medal	Shan Ying	China

The finals and the qualifying heats of the women's 100 metre freestyle event at the 1998 World Aquatics Championships were held on Sunday 18 January 1998 in Perth, Western Australia.

== A Final ==
Rank	Name	Time
Gold medal	Jenny Thompson (USA)	54.95
Silver medal	Martina Moravcová (SVK)	55.09
Bronze medal	Shan Ying (CHN)	55.10
4	Amy Van Dyken (USA)	55.15
5	Sandra Völker (GER)	55.33
6	Sue Rolph (GBR)	56.03
7	Sumika Minamoto (JPN)	56.48
8	Inge de Bruijn (NED)	56.49

== B Final ==
Rank	Name	Time
9	Wilma van Hofwegen (NED)	56.12
10	Shannon Shakespeare (CAN)	56.30
10	Rania Elwani (EGY)	56.30
12	Metka Šparovec (SLO)	56.36
13	Laura Nicholls (CAN)	56.61
14	Louise Jöhncke (SWE)	56.67
15.	Karen Pickering (GBR)	56.88
1	Sun Guiling (CHN)	57.03

== See also ==
- 1996 Women's Olympic Games 100m Freestyle (Atlanta)
- 1997 Women's World SC Championships 100m Freestyle (Gothenburg)
- 1997 Women's European LC Championships 100m Freestyle (Seville)
- 2000 Women's Olympic Games 100m Freestyle (Sydney)
