= 1998 European Short Course Swimming Championships – Women's 100 metre freestyle =

The finals and the qualifying heats of the Women's 100 metres Freestyle event at the 1998 European Short Course Swimming Championships were held on the first day of the competition, on Friday 11 December 1998 in Sheffield, England.

== Finals ==
| RANK | FINAL | TIME |
|---|---|---|
| Gold medal | Sue Rolph (GBR) | 53.84 |
| Silver medal | Martina Moravcová (SVK) | 53.93 |
| Bronze medal | Louise Jöhncke (SWE) | 53.97 |
| 4. | Sandra Völker (GER) | 53.98 |
| 5. | Katrin Meissner (GER) | 54.43 |
| 6. | Sophia Skou (DEN) | 54.78 |
| 7. | Claire Huddart (GBR) | 55.06 |
| 8. | Sandra Steffensen (SWE) | 55.31 |

== Qualifying Heats ==
| RANK | HEATS RANKING | TIME |
|---|---|---|
| 1. | Sandra Völker (GER) | 53.95 |
| 2. | Martina Moravcová (SVK) | 54.39 |
| 3. | Sue Rolph (GBR) | 54.50 |
| 4. | Sophia Skou (DEN) | 54.58 |
| 5. | Louise Jöhncke (SWE) | 54.73 |
| 6. | Katrin Meissner (GER) | 55.06 |
| 7. | Inge de Bruijn (NED) | 55.27 |
| 8. | Claire Huddart (GBR) | 55.56 |
| 9. | Sandra Steffensen (SWE) | 55.65 |
| 10. | Tonia Machaira (GRE) | 55.87 |
| 11. | Wilma van Hofwegen (NED) | 56.15 |
| 12. | Laura Roca (ESP) | 56.33 |
| 13. | Dominique Diezi (SUI) | 56.51 |
| 14. | Cristina Chiuso (ITA) | 56.58 |
| 15. | Ursa Slapsak (SLO) | 56.69 |
| 16. | Blanca Cerón (ESP) | 56.76 |
| 17. | Camelia Potec (ROM) | 56.83 |
| 18. | Judith Draxler (AUT) | 57.02 |
| 19. | Ivana Walterová (SVK) | 57.03 |
| 20. | Marja Heikkila (FIN) | 57.23 |
| 20. | Ilona Hlaváčková (CZE) | 57.23 |
| 22. | Nina Van Koeckhoven (BEL) | 57.25 |
| 22. | Sandrine Paquier (SUI) | 57.25 |
| 24. | Chantal Gibney (IRL) | 57.27 |
| 25. | Lara Heinz (LUX) | 57.36 |
| 26. | Metka Šparovec (SLO) | 57.42 |
| 26. | Perrine Lerhun (FRA) | 57.42 |
| 28. | Ana Alegria (POR) | 57.54 |
| 29. | Liesbet Dreesen (BEL) | 57.97 |
| 30. | Dita Zelviene (LTU) | 58.13 |
| 31. | Ludivine Chouipe (FRA) | 58.16 |
| 31. | Kolbrun Kristjansdottir (ISL) | 58.16 |
| 33. | Lucie Vyoralová (CZE) | 58.50 |
| 34. | Eirini Kosta (GRE) | 58.62 |
