= Finland at the 1996 Summer Olympics =

- IOC code: FIN
- NOC: Finnish Olympic Committee
- Website: sport.fi/olympiakomitea (in Finnish and Swedish)

in Atlanta
- Competitors: 76 (47 men and 29 women) in 15 sports
- Flag bearer: Mikko Kolehmainen
- Medals Ranked 40th: Gold 1 Silver 2 Bronze 1 Total 4

Summer Olympics appearances (overview)
- 1908; 1912; 1920; 1924; 1928; 1932; 1936; 1948; 1952; 1956; 1960; 1964; 1968; 1972; 1976; 1980; 1984; 1988; 1992; 1996; 2000; 2004; 2008; 2012; 2016; 2020; 2024

Other related appearances
- 1906 Intercalated Games

Finland competed at the 1996 Summer Olympics in Atlanta, Georgia, United States. 76 competitors, 47 men and 29 women, took part in 74 events in 15 sports.

== Medalists ==
=== Gold ===
- Heli Rantanen — Athletics, Women's Javelin Throw

=== Silver ===
- Jani Sievinen — Swimming, Men's 200 metres Individual Medley
- Marko Asell — Wrestling, Men's Greco-Roman Welterweight (74 kg)

=== Bronze ===
- Seppo Räty — Athletics, Men's Javelin Throw

== Archery ==
The Finnish team sent only men to the 1996 archery tournament. Each won his first match, while two were defeated in the second round. Tomi Poikolainen was the only Finn to reach the third round, where he was defeated. The squad won its first match in the team round, but was soundly defeated in the quarterfinal.

Men's Individual Competition:

- Tomi Poikolainen → Round of 16, 12th place (2-1)
- Jari Lipponen → Round of 32, 20th place (1-1)
- Tommi Tuovila → Round of 32, 32nd place (1-1)

Men's Team Competition:

- Poikolainen, Lipponen, and Tuovila → Quarterfinal, 8th place (1-1)

== Athletics ==
Men's 110 metres Hurdles

- Antti Haapakoski

Men's Marathon

- Harri Hänninen — 2:18.41 (→ 32nd place)
- Risto Ulmala — did not finish (→ no ranking)

Men's 50 km Walk

- Valentin Kononen — 3:47:40 (→ 7th place)
- Antero Lindman — 4:07:58 (→ 30th place)
- Jani Lehtinen — did not finish (→ no ranking)

Men's Pole Vault

- Heikki Vääräniemi

Men's Shot Put

- Mika Halvari
- Arsi Harju

Men's Javelin Throw

- Seppo Räty
- Kimmo Kinnunen
- Harri Hakkarainen

Men's Hammer Throw

- Marko Wahlman
  - Qualification — 73.50m (→ did not advance)

Women's 100 metres

- Sanna Kyllönen

Women's 200 metres

- Sanna Kyllönen

Women's 10.000 metres

- Annemari Sandell
  - Qualification — 31:40.42
  - Final — 32:14.66 (→ 12th place)

Women's 4 × 100 m Relay

- Johanna Manninen
- Sanna Kyllönen
- Heidi Suomi
- Anu Pirttimaa

Women's Javelin Throw

- Heli Rantanen
  - Qualification — 66.54 m
  - Final — 67.94 m (→ Gold Medal)
- Mikaela Ingberg
  - Qualification — 60.46 m
  - Final — 61.52 m (→ 7th place)
- Taina Uppa
  - Qualification — 57.74 m (→ did not advance)

Women's Shot Put

- Karoliina Lundahl
  - Qualification — 17.14m (→ did not advance)

Women's Long Jump

- Heli Koivula
  - Qualification — NM (→ did not advance)

Women's Triple Jump

- Heli Koivula
  - Qualification — 13.25 m (→ did not advance)

Women's Heptathlon

- Tiia Hautala
  - Final Result — 5887 points (→ 21st place)

Women's Marathon

- Kirsi Rauta — did not finish (→ no ranking)

Women's 10 km Walk

- Sari Essayah — 45:02 (→ 16th place)

== Badminton ==
Men's Singles

- Pontus Jäntti
- Robert Liljequist

== Canoeing ==
Men's Kayak Singles, 500 metres

- Mikko Kolehmainen

Men's Kayak Singles, 1,000 metres

- Mikko Kolehmainen

== Cycling ==
=== Road Competition ===
Men's Individual Road Race

- Joona Laukka
- Kari Myyryläinen

Women's Individual Road Race

- Tea Vikstedt-Nyman
  - Final — 02:37:06 (→ 34th place)

Women's Individual Time Trial

- Tea Vikstedt-Nyman
  - Final — 38:24 (→ 6th place)

=== Track Competition ===
Men's Individual Pursuit, 4,000 metres

- Jukka Heinikainen

Women's Sprint, 1,000 metres

- Mira Kasslin

Women's Points Race

- Tea Vikstedt-Nyman

== Equestrianism ==
Individual Mixed Dressage

- Kyra Kyrklund

== Fencing ==
One female fencer represented Finland in 1996.

Women's épée

- Minna Lehtola

== Judo ==
Men's Half-Lightweight

- Pasi Lauren

== Rhythmic gymnastics ==
Women's Individual Rhythmic Gymnastics

- Katri Kalpala

== Rowing ==
Men's Single Sculls

- Tomas Söderblom

Women's Single Sculls

- Laila Finska-Bezerra

== Swimming ==
Men's 50 m Freestyle

- Janne Blomqvist
  - Heat — 23.61 (→ did not advance, 37th place)

Men's 100 m Freestyle

- Kalle Varonen
  - Heat — 52.00 (→ did not advance, 44th place)

Men's 200 m Freestyle

- Jani Sievinen
  - Heat — 1:49.05
  - Swim-off for 8th — 1:48.89 (→ scratched second swim-off)
- Antti Kasvio
  - Heat — 1:50.55 (→ did not advance, 18th place)

Men's 100 m Butterfly

- Vesa Hanski
  - Heat — 54.73 (→ did not advance, 25th place)

Men's 200 m Butterfly

- Vesa Hanski
  - Heat — 1:59.73
  - B-Final — 1:59.64 (→ 10th place)

Men's 200 m Individual Medley

- Jani Sievinen
  - Heat — 2:01.05
  - Final — 2:00.13 (→ Silver Medal)
- Petteri Lehtinen
  - Heat — 2:05.51 (→ did not advance, 19th place)

Men's 400 m Individual Medley

- Jani Sievinen
  - Heat — 4:23.13
  - Final — scratched

Men's 4 × 100 m Freestyle Relay

- Jani Sievinen, Antti Kasvio, Janne Blomqvist, and Kalle Varonen
  - Heat — 3:22.99 (→ did not advance, 12th place)

Women's 50 m Freestyle

- Minna Salmela
  - Heat — 26.72 (→ did not advance, 34th place)

Women's 100 m Freestyle

- Minna Salmela
  - Heat — 57.15 (→ did not advance, 22nd place)

Women's 200 m Freestyle

- Paula Harmokivi
  - Heat — 2:03.54 (→ did not advance, 18th place)

Women's 400 m Freestyle

- Paula Harmokivi
  - Heat — 4:23.84 (→ did not advance, 33rd place)

Women's 100 m Backstroke

- Anu Koivisto
  - Heat — 1:05.26 (→ did not advance, 23rd place)

Women's 200 m Backstroke

- Anu Koivisto
  - Heat — 2:19.58 (→ did not advance, 25th place)

Women's 100 m Breaststroke

- Mia Hagman
  - Heat — 1:13.01 (→ did not advance, 32nd place)

Women's 200 m Breaststroke

- Mia Hagman
  - Heat — 2:36.11 (→ did not advance, 25th place)

Women's 100 m Butterfly

- Marja Pärssinen
  - Heat — 1:02.53 (→ did not advance, 22nd place)

Women's 4 × 100 m Freestyle Relay

- Minna Salmela, Paula Harmokivi, Marja Pärssinen, and Marja Heikkilä
  - Heat — 3:50.33 (→ did not advance, 16th place)

Women's 4 × 100 m Medley Relay

- Anu Koivisto, Mia Hagman, Marja Pärssinen, and Minna Salmela
  - Heat — 4:14.14 (→ did not advance, 14th place)

== Weightlifting ==
Men's Lightweight

- Jouni Grönman

Men's Heavyweight

- Janne Kanerva

== Wrestling ==
Men's Lightweight, Greco-Roman

- Marko Yli-Hannuksela

Men's Welterweight, Greco-Roman

- Marko Asell

Men's Middleweight, Greco-Roman

- Tuomo Karila

Men's Light-Heavyweight, Greco-Roman

- Harri Koskela

Men's Super-Heavyweight, Greco-Roman

- Juha Ahokas

== Notes ==
- Watkins, Ginger T., ed. (1997). The Official Report of the Centennial Olympic Games, Volume III The Competition Results (PDF). Atlanta: Peachtree Publishers. ISBN 1-56145-150-9. Archived from the original (PDF) on 2007-09-27.
