= Swimming at the 1998 World Aquatics Championships – Women's 200 metre freestyle =

Women's 200 metre freestyle at the 1998 FINA World Championships
- Date: 13 January 1998
- Winning time: 1 minute 58.90 seconds

Medalists
gold medal	Claudia Poll	Costa Rica
silver medal	Martina Moravcová	Slovakia
bronze medal	Julia Greville	Australia

The finals and the qualifying heats of the women's 200 metre freestyle event at the 1998 World Aquatics Championships were held on Tuesday 13 January 1998 in Perth, Western Australia.

== A Final ==
Rank	Name	Time
Gold medal	Claudia Poll (CRC)	1:58.90
Silver medal	Martina Moravcová (SVK)	1:59.61
Bronze medal	Julia Greville (AUS)	1:59.92
4	Tsai Shu-min (TPE)	1:59.93
5	Kerstin Kielgass (GER)	2:00.01
6	Susie O'Neill (AUS)	2:00.33
7	Cristina Teuscher (USA)	2:00.64
8	Lindsay Benko (USA)	2:01.28

== B Final ==
Rank	Name	Time
9	Nadezhda Chemezova (RUS)	2:01.19
10	Louise Jöhncke (SWE)	2:01.32
11	Jessica Deglau (CAN)	2:01.62
12	Karen Pickering (GBR)	2:01.77
13	Liliana Dobrescu (ROM)	2:01.83
13	Camelia Potec (ROM)	2:01.83
15	Josefin Lillhage (SWE)	2:03.23
16	Wang Luna (CHN)	2:03.66

== See also ==
- 1996 Women's Olympic Games 200m Freestyle (Atlanta)
- 1997 Women's World SC Championships 200m Freestyle (Gothenburg)
- 1997 Women's European LC Championships 200m Freestyle (Seville)
- 2000 Women's Olympic Games 200m Freestyle (Sydney)
