= 1997 FINA Short Course World Championships – Women's 50m freestyle =

The finals and the qualifying heats of the women's 50 metres freestyle event at the 1997 FINA Short Course World Championships were held on the second day of the competition, on Friday 18 April 1997 in Gothenburg, Sweden.

== Finals ==
RANK	FINAL A	TIME
	Sandra Völker (GER)	24.70 ER
	Jenny Thompson (USA)	24.78
	Le Jingyi (CHN)	24.83
4.	Katrin Meissner (GER)	25.13
5.	Leah Martindale (BAR)	25.32
6.	Sue Rolph (GBR)	25.41
7.	Therese Alshammar (SWE)	24.54
8.	Siobhan Cropper (TRI)	25.68

RANK	FINAL B	TIME
9.	Chao Na (CHN)	25.47
10.	Angela Postma (NED)	25.48
11.	Natalya Meshcheryakova (RUS)	25.57
12.	Judith Draxler (AUT)	25.67
13.	Dita Zelviene (LTU)	25.78
14.	Charlene Wittstock (RSA)	25.85
15.	Laura Nicholls (CAN)	25.89
—	Angela Kennedy (AUS)	DSQ

== Qualifying heats ==
RANK	HEATS RANKING	TIME
1.	Sandra Völker (GER)	24.62
2.	Jenny Thompson (USA)	25.01
3.	Le Jingyi (CHN)	25.05
4.	Katrin Meissner (GER)	25.37
5.	Leah Martindale (BAR)	25.51
6.	Sue Rolph (GBR)	25.55
7.	Siobhan Cropper (TRI)	25.58
8.	Therese Alshammar (SWE)	25.63
9.	Chao Na (CHN)	25.67
10.	Dita Zelviene (LTU)	25.68
11.	Charlene Wittstock (RSA)	25.75
12.	Natalya Meshcheryakova (RUS)	25.77
13.	Angela Postma (NED)	25.79
14.	Laura Nicholls (CAN)	25.82
15.	Angela Kennedy (AUS)	25.85
16.	Judith Draxler (AUT)	25.87
17.	Sarah Ryan (AUS)	25.97
18.	Lindsey Farella (USA)	25.98
19.	Karen Hawcroft (GBR)	25.99
20.	Mette Norskov (DEN)	26.04
21.	Christine Cech (RSA)	26.09
21.	Yevgeniya Yermakova (KAZ)	26.09
23.	Elin Sigurdardottir (ISL)	26.17
24.	Viviana Susin (ITA)	26.20
25.	Ivana Walterová (SVK)	26.68
26.	Michelle Cruz (CAN)	26.76
27.	Catherine Surya (INA)	26.88
28.	Valeria Alvarez (ARG)	26.92
29.	Agnese Ozolina (LAT)	26.93

== See also ==
- 1996 Women's Olympic Games 50m Freestyle
- 1997 Women's European LC Championships 50m Freestyle
