= Zeïna Sahelí =

Senegalese swimmer

Personal information
- Full name: Zeïna Sahelí
- National team: Senegal
- Born: 13 September 1983 (age 42) Dakar, Senegal
- Height: 1.62 m (5 ft 4 in)
- Weight: 52 kg (115 lb)

Sport
- Sport: Swimming
- Strokes: Freestyle

Zeïna Sahelí (born September 13, 1983) is a Senegalese former swimmer, who specialized in sprint freestyle events. Saheli competed for Senegal in the women's 100 m freestyle at the 2000 Summer Olympics in Sydney. She received a ticket from FINA, under a Universality program, in an entry time of 1:07.33. She challenged seven other swimmers in heat one, including 15-year-olds Maria Awori of Kenya Nathalie Lee Baw of Mauritius. Storming from sixth at the final turn, Saheli held off a sprint battle from Uganda's Supra Singhal to hit the wall by 0.78 seconds in 1:07.37. Saheli failed to advance into the semifinals, as she placed fifty-first overall in the prelims.
