= Swimming at the 1998 World Aquatics Championships – Women's 4 × 200 metre freestyle relay =

Women's 4×200 metre freestyle relay at the 1998 FINA World Championships
- Date: 17 January 1998
- Winning time: 8 minutes 01.46 seconds

Medalists
gold medal	Franziska van Almsick; Dagmar Hase; Silvia Szalai; Kerstin Kielgass	Germany
silver medal	Cristina Teuscher; Lindsay Benko; Brooke Bennett; Jenny Thompson	United States
bronze medal	Julia Greville; Anna Windsor; Susie O'Neill; Petria Thomas	Australia

The final and the qualifying heats of the women's 4×200 metre freestyle relay event at the 1998 World Aquatics Championships were held on Saturday 17 January 1998 in Perth, Western Australia.

== Final ==
Rank	Team	Time
Gold medal	Germany; Franziska van Almsick; Dagmar Hase; Silvia Szalai; Kerstin Kielgass	8:01.46; 2:01.28; 2:00.16; 2:00.42; 1:59.60
Silver medal	United States; Cristina Teuscher; Lindsay Benko; Brooke Bennett; Jenny Thompson	8:02.88; 2:00.92; 2:00.94; 2:01.17; 1:59.85
Bronze medal	Australia; Julia Greville; Anna Windsor; Susie O'Neill; Petria Thomas	8:04.19; 2:00.92; 2:03.23; 1:58.80; 2:01.24
4	Canada; Joanne Malar; Shannon Shakespeare; Jessica Deglau; Laura Nicholls	8:05.59; 2:02.44; 2:01.40; 2:00.65; 2:01.10
5	Sweden; Louise Jöhncke; Josefin Lillhage; Malin Svahnström; Therese Alshammar	8:07.60; 2:01.51; 2:01.52; 1:59.84; 2:04.73
6	Great Britain; Claire Huddart; Victoria Horner; Jessica Craig; Karen Pickering	8:08.14; 2:02.71; 2:01.33; 2:03.54; 2:00.56
7	Romania; Camelia Potec; Simona Păduraru; Ioana Diaconescu; Liliana Dobrescu	8:10.06; 2:02.46; 2:03.29; 2:01.95; 2:02.36
8	Netherlands; Carla Geurts; Manon Masseurs; Wilma van Hofwegen; Kirsten Vlieghuis	8:11.63; 2:03.19; 2:03.09; 2:02.95; 2:02.40

== Qualifying heats ==
=== Heat 1 ===
Rank	Team	Time
1	United States; Trina Jackson; Ashley Whitney; Lindsay Benko; Cristina Teuscher	8:07.12; 2:01.87; 2:01.49; 2:00.65; 2:03.11
2	Canada; Laura Nicholls; Joanne Malar; Karine Chevrier; Shannon Shakespeare	8:11.98; 2:02.67; 2:02.17; 2:04.31; 2:02.83
3	Sweden; Malin Svahnström; Malin Nilsson; Josefin Lillhage; Louise Jöhncke	8:13.46; 2:03.46; 2:04.17; 2:02.10; 2:03.73
4	Netherlands; Carla Geurts; Maartje Kouwenberg; Manon Masseurs; Wilma van Hofwegen	8:16.61; 2:02.92; 2:06.86; 2:03.96; 2:02.87
5	Chinese Taipei; Chiang-Tzu Ying; Lin-Meng Chieh; Chen-Chia Cheng; Yang-Hsiao Hui	9:07.86; 2:14.60; 2:14.61; 2:21.59; 2:17.06

=== Heat 2 ===
Rank	Team	Time
1	Germany; Silvia Szalai; Antje Buschschulte; Janina Götz; Franziska van Almsick	8:08.38; 2:02.19; 2:02.20; 2:02.95; 2:01.04
2	Great Britain; Claire Huddart; Victoria Horner; Jessica Craig; Karen Pickering	8:09.99; 2:03.42; 2:02.84; 2:02.31; 2:01.42
3	Australia; Julia Greville; Petria Thomas; Emma Johnson; Anna Windsor	8:10.65; 2:01.05; 2:02.63; 2:04.15; 2:02.82
4	Romania; Simona Păduraru; Ioana Diaconescu; Camelia Potec; Liliana Dobrescu	8:10.65; 2:05.55; 2:02.30; 2:03.07; 2:00.73
5	Denmark; Ditte Jensen; Britt Raaby; Berit Puggaard; Mia Muusfeldt	8:17.16; 2:05.15; 2:04.73; 2:03.08; 2:04.20
6	BRAZIL; Monique Ferreira; Raquel Takaya; Lucia Santos; Tatiana Lemos	8:39.41; 2:08.62; 2:09.11; 2:10.37; 2:11.31

== See also ==
- 1996 Women's Olympic Games 4x200m Freestyle (Atlanta)
- 1997 Women's World Championships (SC) 4x200m Freestyle (Gothenburg)
- 1997 Women's European Championships (LC) 4x200m Freestyle (Seville)
- 2000 Women's Olympic Games 4x200m Freestyle (Sydney)
