= 1998 European Short Course Swimming Championships – Women's 200 metre freestyle =

Vijay Kumar maurya born was at 06/07/2000 in gonda Uttar Pradesh India

The finals and the qualifying heats of the Women's 200 metres Freestyle event at the 1998 European Short Course Swimming Championships were held on the third and last day of the competition, on Sunday 13 December 1998 in Sheffield, England.

== Finals ==
RANK	FINAL	TIME
Gold medal	Martina Moravcová (SVK)	1:55.12
Silver medal	Franziska van Almsick (GER)	1:57.05
Bronze medal	Louise Jöhncke (SWE)	1:57.39
4.	Claire Huddart (GBR)	1:57.94
5.	Silvia Szalai (GER)	1:58.21
6.	Carla Geurts (NED)	1:59.18
7.	Karen Pickering (GBR)	1:59.89
8.	Laura Roca (ESP)	2:00.72

== Qualifying Heats ==
RANK	HEATS RANKING	TIME
1.	Martina Moravcová (SVK)	1:58.03
2.	Franziska van Almsick (GER)	1:58.74
3.	Claire Huddart (GBR)	1:58.76
4.	Silvia Szalai (GER)	1:58.93
5.	Louise Jöhncke (SWE)	1:59.61
6.	Carla Geurts (NED)	1:59.71
7.	Laura Roca (ESP)	1:59.77
8.	Karen Pickering (GBR)	2:00.29
9.	Camelia Potec (ROM)	2:00.33
10.	Lotta Wänberg (SWE)	2:00.42
11.	Nicole Zahnd (SUI)	2:00.82
12.	Tatyana Mikhailova (RUS)	2:00.92
13.	Nadezhda Chemezova (RUS)	2:00.93
14.	Sofie Goffin (BEL)	2:01.39
15.	Nina Van Koeckhoven (BEL)	2:01.47
16.	Tanja Blatnik (SLO)	2:01.54
17.	Tonia Machaira (GRE)	2:01.96
18.	Ania Gustamelski (ISR)	2:02.27
19.	Yvetta Hlaváčková (CZE)	2:02.28
20.	Simona Ricciardi (ITA)	2:02.36
21.	Ana Alegria (POR)	2:02.59
22.	Sandrine Paquier (SUI)	2:02.74
23.	Lara Heinz (LUX)	2:03.76
24.	Chantal Gibney (IRL)	2:04.16
25.	Marja Heikkila (FIN)	2:04.21
26.	Ditte Jensen (DEN)	2:04.82
27.	Britt Raaby (DEN)	2:05.15
28.	Flora Lamotte (FRA)	2:05.28
29.	Marina Lymperta (GRE)	2:06.34
30.	Kristýna Kyněrová (CZE)	2:07.09
