= Swimming at the 2000 Summer Olympics – Women's 100 metre freestyle =

Women's 100 metre freestyle at the Games of the XXVII Olympiad
- Venue: Sydney International Aquatic Centre
- Date: September 20, 2000 (heats & semifinals); September 21, 2000 (final)
- Competitors: 56 from 51 nations
- Winning time: 53.83

Medalists
1st place, gold medalist(s)		Inge de Bruijn	Netherlands
2nd place, silver medalist(s)		Therese Alshammar	Sweden
3rd place, bronze medalist(s)		Jenny Thompson	United States
3rd place, bronze medalist(s)		Dara Torres	United States

The women's 100 metre freestyle event at the 2000 Summer Olympics took place on 20–21 September at the Sydney International Aquatic Centre in Sydney, Australia.

Dutch rising star Inge de Bruijn stormed home on the final lap to claim her second gold at these Games. She powered past her rivals in a star-studded field to touch the wall first in 53.83. Earlier in the semifinals, she delivered a time of 53.77 to erase her own world record by 0.03 of a second. Almost stealing the race from lane one, Therese Alshammar took home the silver in a Swedish record of 54.33. Meanwhile, top favorites Dara Torres and Jenny Thompson gave the Americans a further reason to celebrate, as they shared bronze medals in a matching time of 54.63. This was also Thompson's ninth career medal at these Games, making her the most decorated female swimmer in Olympic history.

Slovakia's Martina Moravcová, who captured two silver medals in swimming, finished outside the podium in fifth place at 54.72. South Africa's Helene Muller managed to pull off a sixth-place finish in an African standard of 55.19. Japan's Sumika Minamoto (55.53) and De Bruijn's teammate Wilma van Rijn (55.58) closed out the field.

Notable swimmers failed to reach the top 8 final, featuring Australia's overwhelming favorites Sarah Ryan and Susie O'Neill, Germany's Sandra Völker, silver medalist in Atlanta four years earlier, and Egypt's Rania Elwani, who surprisingly reached the semifinals from an unseeded heat.

== Records ==
Prior to this competition, the existing world and Olympic records were as follows.

World record	Inge de Bruijn (NED)	53.80	Sheffield, Great Britain	28 May 2000
Olympic record	Le Jingyi (CHN)	54.50	Atlanta, United States	20 July 1996

The following new world and Olympic records were set during this competition.

Date	Event	Name	Nationality	Time	Record
20 September	Semifinal 2	Inge de Bruijn	Netherlands	53.77	WR

== Results ==
=== Heats ===
Rank	Heat	Lane	Name	Nationality	Time	Notes
1	7	4	Inge de Bruijn	Netherlands	54.77	Q
2	5	5	Dara Torres	United States	55.12	Q
3	6	4	Jenny Thompson	United States	55.22	Q
4	6	5	Martina Moravcová	Slovakia	55.42	Q
5	7	2	Helene Muller	South Africa	55.45	Q, AF
6	7	5	Therese Alshammar	Sweden	55.49	Q
7	5	3	Sandra Völker	Germany	55.54	Q
8	6	3	Sue Rolph	Great Britain	55.77	Q
9	5	2	Sumika Minamoto	Japan	55.80	Q
10	7	6	Wilma van Rijn	Netherlands	55.82	Q
11	6	2	Louise Jöhncke	Sweden	55.91	Q
12	6	6	Sarah Ryan	Australia	56.05	Q
13	5	6	Karen Pickering	Great Britain	56.08	Q
14	7	7	Laura Nicholls	Canada	56.30	Q
15	4	1	Rania Elwani	Egypt	56.31	Q, NR
16	5	7	Alena Popchanka	Belarus	56.33	Q
17	4	3	Hanna-Maria Seppälä	Finland	56.68	
18	3	6	Olga Mukomol	Ukraine	56.69	
19	7	8	Han Xue	China	56.79	
20	6	7	Yekaterina Kibalo	Russia	56.97	
21	4	4	Cristina Chiuso	Italy	57.09	
22	6	1	Joscelin Yeo	Singapore	57.15	
23	4	2	Florencia Szigeti	Argentina	57.20	
24	2	6	Leah Martindale	Barbados	57.21	
25	5	1	Antonia Machaira	Greece	57.24	
26	6	8	Ilona Hlaváčková	Czech Republic	57.37	
27	5	8	Judith Draxler	Austria	57.40	
28	3	4	Kirsty Coventry	Zimbabwe	57.47	
29	2	4	Elina Partõka	Estonia	57.71	
29	3	5	Gyöngyver Lakos	Hungary	57.71	
31	7	3	Susie O'Neill	Australia	57.78	
32	4	8	Eileen Coparropa	Panama	57.82	
33	4	6	Monique Robins	New Zealand	57.85	
34	2	2	Siobhan Cropper	Trinidad and Tobago	57.91	
35	4	5	Tine Bossuyt	Belgium	58.02	
36	2	1	Lára Hrund Bjargardóttir	Iceland	58.44	
37	3	2	Lara Heinz	Luxembourg	58.55	
38	2	7	Caroline Pickering	Fiji	58.62	
39	3	8	Pilin Tachakittiranan	Thailand	58.69	
40	4	7	Chang Hee-jin	South Korea	58.77	
41	3	1	Jūratė Ladavičiūtė	Lithuania	58.78	
42	3	3	Chantal Gibney	Ireland	58.79	
43	2	8	Yekaterina Tochenaya	Kyrgyzstan	58.80	
44	2	3	Anna Stylianou	Cyprus	59.08	
45	2	5	Agnese Ozoliņa	Latvia	59.28	
46	3	7	Tsai Shu-min	Chinese Taipei	59.39	
47	1	8	Nicole Hayes	Palau	1:00.89	
48	1	5	Rola El Haress	Lebanon	1:03.26	
49	1	2	Maria Awori	Kenya	1:06.23	
50	1	3	Nathalie Lee Baw	Mauritius	1:06.67	
51	1	7	Zeïna Sahelí	Senegal	1:07.37	
52	1	4	Supra Singhal	Uganda	1:08.15	
53	1	6	Sanjaajamtsyn Altantuyaa	Mongolia	1:10.22	
54	1	1	Katerina Izmaylova	Tajikistan	1:19.12	
	5	4	Antje Buschschulte	Germany	DNS	
	7	1	Marianne Limpert	Canada	DNS	

=== Semifinals ===
==== Semifinal 1 ====
Rank	Lane	Name	Nationality	Time	Notes
1	4	Dara Torres	United States	55.02	Q
2	5	Martina Moravcová	Slovakia	55.06	Q
3	2	Wilma van Rijn	Netherlands	55.28	Q
4	3	Therese Alshammar	Sweden	55.31	Q
5	6	Sue Rolph	Great Britain	55.69	
6	7	Sarah Ryan	Australia	55.93	
7	1	Laura Nicholls	Canada	55.94	
8	8	Alena Popchanka	Belarus	56.40	

==== Semifinal 2 ====
Rank	Lane	Name	Nationality	Time	Notes
1	4	Inge de Bruijn	Netherlands	53.77	Q, WR
2	5	Jenny Thompson	United States	54.40	Q
3	3	Helene Muller	South Africa	55.24	Q, AF
4	2	Sumika Minamoto	Japan	55.62	Q
5	1	Karen Pickering	Great Britain	55.71	
6	8	Rania Elwani	Egypt	55.85	NR
7	7	Louise Jöhncke	Sweden	55.94	
8	6	Sandra Völker	Germany	55.97	

=== Final ===
Rank	Lane	Name	Nationality	Time	Notes
1st place, gold medalist(s)	4	Inge de Bruijn	Netherlands	53.83	
2nd place, silver medalist(s)	1	Therese Alshammar	Sweden	54.33	NR
3rd place, bronze medalist(s)	5	Jenny Thompson	United States	54.43	
3rd place, bronze medalist(s)	3	Dara Torres	United States	54.43	
5	6	Martina Moravcová	Slovakia	54.72	
6	2	Helene Muller	South Africa	55.19	AF
7	8	Sumika Minamoto	Japan	55.53	
8	7	Wilma van Rijn	Netherlands	55.58	
