= Rola El Haress =

Lebanese swimmer (born 1983)

Personal information
- Full name: Rola El Haress
- National team: Lebanon
- Born: 5 March 1983 (age 43) Beirut, Lebanon
- Height: 1.68 m (5 ft 6 in)
- Weight: 57 kg (126 lb)

Sport
- Sport: Swimming
- Strokes: Freestyle

Rola El Haress (Arabic: رولا الحارس; born March 5, 1983) is a Lebanese former swimmer, who specialized in sprint freestyle events. El Haress competed for Lebanon in the women's 100 m freestyle at the 2000 Summer Olympics in Sydney. She received a ticket from FINA, under a Universality program, in an entry time of 1:00.00. She challenged seven other swimmers in heat one, including 15-year-olds Maria Awori of Kenya and Nathalie Lee Baw of Mauritius. She raced to the second seed in a time of 1:03.26, more than three seconds outside her personal best. El Haress failed to advance into the semifinals, as she placed forty-eighth overall in the prelims.
