= Swimming at the 1996 Summer Olympics – Women's 200 metre freestyle =

Women's 200 metre freestyle at the Games of the XXVI Olympiad
- Venue: Georgia Tech Aquatic Center
- Date: 21 July 1996 (heats & finals)
- Competitors: 42 from 35 nations
- Winning time: 1:58.16

Medalists
| 1st place, gold medalist(s) | | Claudia Poll | Costa Rica |
| 2nd place, silver medalist(s) | | Franziska van Almsick | Germany |
| 3rd place, bronze medalist(s) | | Dagmar Hase | Germany |

The women's 200 metre freestyle event at the 1996 Summer Olympics took place on 21 July at the Georgia Tech Aquatic Center in Atlanta, United States.

== Records ==
Prior to this competition, the existing world and Olympic records were as follows.

| World record | Franziska van Almsick (GER) | 1:56.78 | Rome, Italy | 6 September 1994 |
| Olympic record | Heike Friedrich (GDR) | 1:57.65 | Seoul, South Korea | 21 September 1988 |

== Results ==
=== Heats ===
Rule: The eight fastest swimmers advance to final A (Q), while the next eight to final B (q).

| Rank | Heat | Lane | Name | Nationality | Time | Notes |
|---|---|---|---|---|---|---|
| 1 | 6 | 4 | Franziska van Almsick | Germany | 1:59.40 | Q |
| 2 | 5 | 4 | Claudia Poll | Costa Rica | 1:59.87 | Q |
| 3 | 5 | 5 | Trina Jackson | United States | 2:00.29 | Q |
| 4 | 5 | 3 | Dagmar Hase | Germany | 2:00.38 | Q |
| 5 | 5 | 6 | Julia Greville | Australia | 2:00.44 | Q |
| 6 | 6 | 5 | Cristina Teuscher | United States | 2:00.57 | Q |
| 7 | 5 | 7 | Luminița Dobrescu | Romania | 2:00.85 | Q |
| 8 | 4 | 6 | Susie O'Neill | Australia | 2:00.89 | Q |
| 9 | 4 | 3 | Martina Moravcová | Slovakia | 2:00.99 | q |
| 10 | 4 | 4 | Suzu Chiba | Japan | 2:01.11 | q |
| 11 | 6 | 2 | Louise Jöhncke | Sweden | 2:01.13 | q, NR |
| 12 | 6 | 7 | Karen Pickering | Great Britain | 2:01.46 | q |
| 13 | 4 | 1 | Dionne Bainbridge | New Zealand | 2:02.69 | q |
| 14 | 5 | 1 | Solenne Figuès | France | 2:02.74 | q |
| 15 | 3 | 2 | Antonia Machaira | Greece | 2:03.21 | q, NR |
| 16 | 6 | 3 | Chen Yan | China | 2:03.32 | q, WD |
| 17 | 4 | 2 | Joanne Malar | Canada | 2:03.53 | q |
| 18 | 3 | 4 | Paula Harmokivi | Finland | 2:03.54 | |
| 19 | 4 | 8 | Kristýna Kyněrová | Czech Republic | 2:03.63 | |
| 20 | 4 | 7 | Naoko Imoto | Japan | 2:03.78 | |
| 21 | 5 | 8 | Olena Lapunova | Ukraine | 2:04.07 | |
| 22 | 6 | 1 | Tatyana Litovchenko | Russia | 2:04.09 | |
| 23 | 4 | 5 | Shan Ying | China | 2:04.29 | |
| 24 | 5 | 8 | Malin Nilsson | Sweden | 2:04.39 | |
| 25 | 6 | 6 | Lorena Diaconescu | Romania | 2:04.59 | |
| 26 | 2 | 4 | Sandra Cam | Belgium | 2:04.90 | |
| 27 | 3 | 8 | Marion Madine | Ireland | 2:04.92 | NR |
| 28 | 2 | 1 | Carolyn Adel | Suriname | 2:05.04 | NR |
| 29 | 3 | 1 | Ana Alegria | Portugal | 2:05.16 | |
| 30 | 2 | 5 | Helene Muller | South Africa | 2:05.59 | |
| 31 | 2 | 6 | Ravee Intporn-Udom | Thailand | 2:05.77 | |
| 32 | 2 | 3 | Lee Jie-hyun | South Korea | 2:05.78 | |
| 33 | 2 | 2 | Inga Borodich | Belarus | 2:05.85 | |
| 34 | 3 | 5 | Rania Elwani | Egypt | 2:06.94 | |
| 35 | 3 | 6 | Chang Wei-chia | Chinese Taipei | 2:06.97 | |
| 36 | 6 | 8 | Mia Muusfeldt | Denmark | 2:07.29 | |
| 37 | 2 | 7 | Maritza Chiaway | Peru | 2:07.80 | |
| 38 | 3 | 3 | Chantal Strasser | Switzerland | 2:07.98 | |
| 39 | 3 | 3 | Joscelin Yeo | Singapore | 2:08.10 | |
| 40 | 1 | 5 | Teresa Moodie | Zimbabwe | 2:08.23 | |
| 41 | 1 | 4 | Laura Petrutytė | Lithuania | 2:09.78 | |
| 42 | 1 | 3 | Marina Zarma | Cyprus | 2:10.85 | |

=== Finals ===
==== Final B ====
| Rank | Lane | Name | Nationality | Time | Notes |
|---|---|---|---|---|---|
| 9 | 4 | Martina Moravcová | Slovakia | 2:00.96 | |
| 10 | 5 | Suzu Chiba | Japan | 2:01.00 | |
| 11 | 3 | Louise Jöhncke | Sweden | 2:01.37 | |
| 12 | 7 | Solenne Figuès | France | 2:01.47 | |
| 13 | 6 | Karen Pickering | Great Britain | 2:02.58 | |
| 14 | 1 | Antonia Machaira | Greece | 2:03.19 | NR |
| 15 | 2 | Dionne Bainbridge | New Zealand | 2:03.20 | |
| 16 | 8 | Joanne Malar | Canada | 2:03.79 | |

==== Final A ====
| Rank | Lane | Name | Nationality | Time | Notes |
|---|---|---|---|---|---|
| 1st place, gold medalist(s) | 5 | Claudia Poll | Costa Rica | 1:58.16 | |
| 2nd place, silver medalist(s) | 4 | Franziska van Almsick | Germany | 1:58.57 | |
| 3rd place, bronze medalist(s) | 6 | Dagmar Hase | Germany | 1:59.56 | |
| 4 | 3 | Trina Jackson | United States | 1:59.57 | |
| 5 | 8 | Susie O'Neill | Australia | 1:59.87 | |
| 6 | 7 | Cristina Teuscher | United States | 2:00.79 | |
| 7 | 2 | Julia Greville | Australia | 2:01.46 | |
| 8 | 1 | Luminița Dobrescu | Romania | 2:01.63 | |
