= Chantal Groot =

Dutch swimmer (born 1982)

Personal information
- Full name: Chantal Groot
- Nationality: Netherlands
- Born: 19 October 1982 (age 44) Amsterdam, Netherlands
- Height: 1.75 m (5 ft 9 in)
- Weight: 61 kg (134 lb)

Sport
- Sport: Swimming
- Strokes: butterfly, freestyle
- Club: Nationaal Zweminstituut Amsterdam
Medal record
Women's swimming
Representing the Netherlands
Olympic Games
Silver medal – second place	Sydney 2000	4×100 m freestyle
Bronze medal – third place	Athens 2004	4×100 m freestyle
World Championships (SC)
Gold medal – first place	2006 Shanghai	4×100 m freestyle
Silver medal – second place	1999 Hong Kong	4×100 m freestyle
European Championships (LC)
Gold medal – first place	2008 Eindhoven	50 m butterfly
Silver medal – second place	2004 Madrid	4×100 m freestyle
Silver medal – second place	2006 Budapest	4×100 m freestyle
Bronze medal – third place	1999 Istanbul	50 m butterfly
Bronze medal – third place	2002 Berlin	50 m butterfly
Bronze medal – third place	2002 Berlin	4×100 m freestyle
Bronze medal – third place	2004 Madrid	50 m butterfly
Bronze medal – third place	2004 Madrid	4×100 m medley
Bronze medal – third place	2006 Budapest	50 m butterfly
European Championships (SC)
Gold medal – first place	2003 Dublin	4×50 m freestyle
Gold medal – first place	2004 Vienna	4×50 m freestyle
Gold medal – first place	2005 Trieste	4×50 m freestyle
Silver medal – second place	2006 Helsinki	4×50 m freestyle
Bronze medal – third place	2002 Riesa	4×50 m freestyle
Bronze medal – third place	2002 Riesa	4×50 m medley
Bronze medal – third place	2003 Dublin	4×50 m medley

Chantal Groot (born 19 October 1982) is a butterfly and freestyle swimmer from the Netherlands, who has represented her country in many international championships since 1999. Groot's best distance is the 50 m butterfly in which she won five European LC Championships medals, for the first time in 1999 in Istanbul, and became European Champion in 2008 in Eindhoven.

== Swimming career ==
After winning a gold and a silver medal at the European Junior Swimming Championships 1998 in Antwerp she made her international debut at the 1999 FINA Short Course World Championships in Hong Kong. Groot immediately won her first international medal, a silver, in the 4×100 m freestyle relay together with Thamar Henneken, Wilma van Hofwegen and Inge de Bruijn. Individually she finished 14th in the 100 m butterfly. A few months later she competed in the 1999 European Aquatics Championships in Istanbul. In the 50 m butterfly she won her first individual medal, at the age of 17, reaching third place behind Swedish swimmers Anna-Karin Kammerling and Johanna Sjöberg. Chantal also reached the final of the 50 m freestyle ending up in the 7th place. In the 4×100 m freestyle, she finished fourth with the team.

=== 2000 ===
In 2000, she competed in the 2000 FINA Short Course World Championships in Athens where an 11th place in the 50 m butterfly was her best result. At the 2000 European Aquatics Championships in Helsinki she was in the finals of all three relay events but did not won a medal. Individually a 7th place in the 100 m butterfly was her best performance. Groot was also selected to take part in the 2000 Summer Olympics in Sydney. She swam in the heats of the 4×100 m freestyle but was replaced for the final by Inge de Bruijn, but still received a silver medal for her efforts in the heats. Individually she reached the semi-finals of the 100 m butterfly ending up 11th. In the two other relays there was no success.

=== Post Sydney Olympics ===
The 2001 World Aquatics Championships and the 2002 FINA Short Course World Championships were not successful for Groot. At the 2002 European Aquatics Championships in Berlin she won a bronze medal in the 50 m butterfly. She won also a bronze medal in the 4×100 m freestyle relay together with Manon van Rooijen, Marleen Veldhuis and Wilma van Hofwegen. In December 2002 she won two bronze medals at the European Short Course Swimming Championships 2002 in the 4×50 m freestyle and 4×50 m medley relay. In 2003, she started at the 2003 World Aquatics Championships in Barcelona where she finished 4th in the 4×100 m freestyle, 5th in the 50 m butterfly and 6th with the medley relay. In Dublin in December she won the gold medal in the 4×50 m freestyle and the bronze medal in the 4×50 m medley relay at the European Short Course Swimming Championships 2003.

=== Road to Athens/2004 Olympics ===
2004 started for Groot with the 2004 European Aquatics Championships in Madrid where she won three medals, including silver in the 4×100 m freestyle alongside Inge Dekker, Annabel Kosten and Marleen Veldhuis. There was a bronze medal in the 50 m butterfly and another bronze in the 4×100 m medley together with Stefanie Luiken, Madelon Baans and Marleen Veldhuis. After this tournament she prepared to compete at the 2004 Summer Olympics in Athens, Greece, where she was on the team that captured the bronze medal in the 4×100 m freestyle relay, alongside Inge de Bruijn, Marleen Veldhuis, and Inge Dekker.

=== 2004 post-Olympic tournaments ===
Two months after the Olympics she competed in the 2004 FINA Short Course World Championships in Indianapolis, Indiana. During this tournament she ended 7th in both 100 m butterfly and 100 m freestyle. In December she captured her second European title in the 4×50 m freestyle relay at the European Short Course Swimming Championships 2004 in Vienna and finished 7th again in the 100 m freestyle.

=== 2005-2007 ===
2005 wasn't a fantastic year for Groot with a 4th-place finish in the 4×100 m freestyle and 9th in the 50 m butterfly during the 2005 World Aquatics Championships in Montreal, Quebec, Canada. At the end of the year she won the gold medal for the third time in a row in the 4×50 m freestyle at the European Short Course Swimming Championships 2005. 2006 started off with the 2006 FINA Short Course World Championships in Shanghai. Together with Inge Dekker, Hinkelien Schreuder and Marleen Veldhuis, Groot set a world record and won a gold medal in the 4×100 m freestyle relay in a time of 3:33.32. In the summer she took part in the 2006 European Aquatics Championships in Budapest, Hungary where she added a silver medal, in the 4×100 m freestyle with Dekker, Veldhuis and Ranomi Kromowidjojo, and a bronze medal, fourth time in her career, in the 50 m butterfly to her impressive collection of medals. In Helsinki she won a silver medal in the 4×50 m freestyle at the European Short Course Swimming Championships 2006. Her next big tournament was the 2007 World Aquatics Championships in Melbourne, Australia where she was swum out of the 4×100 m freestyle team by teammate Femke Heemskerk while being a regular team member in the finals for so many years. Individually she ended 13th and 20th in the 50 m and 100 m butterfly making it a disappointing tournament for Groot. A fifth spot at the European Short Course Swimming Championships 2007 was her best result of a disappointing year.

=== 2008 ===
In March 2008 Groot competed in her home country at the 2008 European Aquatics Championships where she finally became European Champion in the 50 m butterfly beating teammate Inge Dekker in the final, after having won the bronze medal four times in this event. In the 100 m butterfly she finished up 5th and qualified for the 2008 Summer Olympics. She started in the heats of the 4×100 m freestyle and 4×100 m medley but was replaced for the finals each time. In the second week of April she participated in the 2008 FINA Short Course World Championships in Manchester. She started individually in the 100 m butterfly and reached a 6th place. She also swam in the heats of the 4×100 m medley but was replaced in the final by Inge Dekker. The Olympic Games in Beijing were a disappointment because she ended 30th in the 100 m butterfly.

== Personal bests ==
Short course
Event	Time	Date	Location
50 m freestyle	24.93	2008-10-18	Aachen, Germany
100 m freestyle	53.91	2007-11-18	Berlin, Germany
50 m butterfly	26.20	2007-11-18	Berlin, Germany
100 m butterfly	57.73	2008-04-13	Manchester, United Kingdom

Long course
Event	Time	Date	Location
50 m freestyle	25.32	2005-04-22	Amsterdam, Netherlands
100 m freestyle	55.23	2003-07-24	Barcelona, Spain
50 m butterfly	26.03	2008-03-19	Eindhoven, Netherlands
100 m butterfly	58.56	2008-03-21	Eindhoven, Netherlands

== See also ==
- List of Dutch records in swimming
