= 1997 FINA Short Course World Championships – Women's 200m freestyle =

The finals and the qualifying heats of the women's 200 metres freestyle event at the 1997 FINA Short Course World Championships were held on the second day of the competition, on Friday 1997-04-18 in Gothenburg, Sweden.

== Finals ==
RANK	FINAL A	TIME
	Claudia Poll (CRC)	1:54.17 WR
	Nian Yun (CHN)	1:56.24
	Martina Moravcová (SVK)	1:56.66
4.	Wang Luna (CHN)	1:56.71
5.	Antje Buschschulte (GER)	1:57.89
5.	Johanna Sjöberg (SWE)	1:57.89
7.	Luminița Dobrescu (ROM)	1:59.14
8.	Julia Greville (AUS)	1:59.16

RANK	FINAL B	TIME
9.	Claire Huddart (GBR)	1:59.16
10.	Karen Pickering (GBR)	1:59.76
11.	Britt Raaby (DEN)	1:59.76
12.	Ioana Diaconescu (ROM)	1:59.91
13.	Malin Svahnström (SWE)	2:00.25
14.	Sophie Simard (CAN)	2:00.91
15.	Jessica Deglau (CAN)	2:01.35
16.	Ana Alegria (POR)	2:01.92

== See also ==
- 1996 Women's Olympic Games 200 m Freestyle
- 1997 Women's European LC Championships 200 m Freestyle
