= Sanjaajamtsyn Altantuyaa =

Mongolian swimmer (born 1976)

Personal information
- Full name: Sanjaajamtsyn Altantuyaa
- National team: Mongolia
- Born: 6 March 1976 (age 50) Ulaanbaatar, Mongolia
- Height: 1.76 m (5 ft 9 in)
- Weight: 70 kg (154 lb)

Sport
- Sport: Swimming
- Strokes: Freestyle

Sanjaajamtsyn Altantuyaa (Mongolian: Санжаажамцын Алтантуяа; born March 6, 1976) is a Mongolian former swimmer, who specialized in sprint freestyle events. Altantuyaa competed for Mongolia in the women's 100 m freestyle at the 2000 Summer Olympics in Sydney. She received a ticket from FINA, under a Universality program, in an entry time of 1:04.00. She challenged seven other swimmers in heat one, including 15-year-olds Maria Awori of Kenya Nathalie Lee Baw of Mauritius. Diving in with the slowest reaction of 1.13 seconds, Altantuyaa fought her way from behind the pack to save a seventh spot over Tajikistan's Katerina Izmaylova by almost nine seconds in 1:10.22. Altantuyaa failed to advance into the semifinals, as she placed fifty-third overall in the prelims.
