= Swimming at the 2000 Summer Olympics – Women's 400 metre freestyle =

Women's 400 metre freestyle at the Games of the XXVII Olympiad
- Venue: Sydney International Aquatic Centre
- Date: September 17, 2000 (heats & final)
- Competitors: 39 from 32 nations
- Winning time: 4:05.80

Medalists
1st place, gold medalist(s)		Brooke Bennett	United States
2nd place, silver medalist(s)		Diana Munz	United States
3rd place, bronze medalist(s)		Claudia Poll	Costa Rica

The women's 400 metre freestyle event at the 2000 Summer Olympics took place on 17 September at the Sydney International Aquatic Centre in Sydney, Australia.

Brooke Bennett emerged as a major force in long-distance swimming, after effortlessly winning a first gold for the United States in the event since Janet Evans did so in 1988. She maintained a powerful lead from start to finish, and posted a lifetime best of 4:05.80, making her the third fastest all-time swimmer in history behind Evans and China's Chen Hua. At only 18 years of age, Diana Munz fought off a sprint challenge from Costa Rica's Claudia Poll and Jamaica's Janelle Atkinson on the final lap to take home the silver in 4:07.07, extending a distance swimming legacy for the Americans with a one–two finish. Meanwhile, Poll settled only for the bronze in 4:07.83.

Atkinson made an Olympic milestone as the first Jamaican to reach a swimming final, but missed out the podium by almost a full second in a national record of 4:08.79. Russia's Nadezhda Chemezova finished fifth in 4:10.37, holding off a fast-pacing Hannah Stockbauer of Germany (4:10.38) by a hundredth of a second (0.01). Netherlands' Carla Geurts (4:12.36), and China's Chen Hua (4:13.11), the second fastest all-time swimmer, rounded out the finale.

== Records ==
Prior to this competition, the existing world and Olympic records were as follows.

World record	Janet Evans (USA)	4:03.85	Seoul, South Korea	22 September 1988
Olympic record	Janet Evans (USA)	4:03.85	Seoul, South Korea	22 September 1988

== Results ==
=== Heats ===
Rank	Heat	Lane	Name	Nationality	Time	Notes
1	3	4	Brooke Bennett	United States	4:07.57	Q
2	3	5	Claudia Poll	Costa Rica	4:09.33	Q
3	3	3	Janelle Atkinson	Jamaica	4:09.61	Q, NR
4	4	5	Diana Munz	United States	4:10.39	Q
5	5	1	Chen Hua	China	4:10.56	Q
6	4	6	Nadezhda Chemezova	Russia	4:10.76	Q
6	5	4	Hannah Stockbauer	Germany	4:10.76	Q
8	3	7	Carla Geurts	Netherlands	4:10.86	Q
9	5	7	Flavia Rigamonti	Switzerland	4:11.77	
10	5	6	Kirsten Vlieghuis	Netherlands	4:11.87	
11	4	4	Camelia Potec	Romania	4:11.92	
12	5	3	Sachiko Yamada	Japan	4:12.45	
13	3	6	Natalya Baranovskaya	Belarus	4:12.67	
14	2	4	Laetitia Choux	France	4:13.09	
15	5	5	Kerstin Kielgaß	Germany	4:13.10	
16	4	1	Simona Păduraru	Romania	4:13.89	
17	4	2	Irina Ufimtseva	Russia	4:15.41	
18	4	7	Kasey Giteau	Australia	4:15.54	
19	5	8	Karine Legault	Canada	4:15.55	
20	4	8	Sofie Goffin	Belgium	4:15.93	
21	3	1	Chantal Strasser	Switzerland	4:16.17	
22	2	2	Artemis Dafni	Greece	4:16.94	
23	4	3	Yasuko Tajima	Japan	4:17.23	
24	2	5	Angels Bardina	Spain	4:17.55	
25	2	8	Lin Chi-chan	Chinese Taipei	4:17.76	
26	2	6	Hana Černá	Czech Republic	4:17.96	
27	5	2	Sarah-Jane D'Arcy	Australia	4:18.05	
28	2	3	Sara Goffi	Italy	4:18.16	
29	3	2	Éva Risztov	Hungary	4:18.48	
30	1	4	Ivanka Moralieva	Bulgaria	4:19.10	
31	1	2	Vesna Stojanovska	Macedonia	4:19.69	
32	3	8	Olena Lapunova	Ukraine	4:19.96	
33	1	3	Patricia Villarreal	Mexico	4:21.03	
34	1	7	Chantal Gibney	Ireland	4:23.73	
35	1	1	Nataliya Korabelnikova	Kyrgyzstan	4:24.29	
36	1	5	Christel Bouvron	Singapore	4:25.16	
37	2	1	Roh Joo-hee	South Korea	4:25.66	
38	1	6	Adi Bichman	Israel	4:27.33	
39	2	7	Pilin Tachakittiranan	Thailand	4:29.28	

=== Final ===
Rank	Lane	Name	Nationality	Time	Notes
1st place, gold medalist(s)	4	Brooke Bennett	United States	4:05.80	
2nd place, silver medalist(s)	6	Diana Munz	United States	4:07.07	
3rd place, bronze medalist(s)	5	Claudia Poll	Costa Rica	4:07.83	
4	3	Janelle Atkinson	Jamaica	4:08.79	NR
5	7	Nadezhda Chemezova	Russia	4:10.37	
6	1	Hannah Stockbauer	Germany	4:10.38	
7	8	Carla Geurts	Netherlands	4:12.36	
8	2	Chen Hua	China	4:13.11	
