= Chemezov =

Chemezov (masculine, Russian: Чемезов) or Chemezova (feminine, Russian: Чемезова) is a Russian surname. Notable people with the surname include:

- Nadezhda Chemezova (born 1980), Russian freestyle swimmer
- Sergey Chemezov (born 1952), Russian businessman and politician
