= Swimming at the 1996 Summer Olympics – Women's 50 metre freestyle =

Women's 50 metre freestyle at the Games of the XXVI Olympiad
- Venue: Georgia Tech Aquatic Center
- Date: 26 July 1996 (heats & finals)
- Competitors: 56 from 48 nations
- Winning time: 24.87 AM

Medalists
1st place, gold medalist(s)		Amy Van Dyken	United States
2nd place, silver medalist(s)		Le Jingyi	China
3rd place, bronze medalist(s)		Sandra Völker	Germany

The women's 50 metre freestyle event at the 1996 Summer Olympics took place on 26 July at the Georgia Tech Aquatic Center in Atlanta, United States.

== Records ==
Prior to this competition, the existing world and Olympic records were as follows.

World record	Le Jingyi (CHN)	24.51	Rome, Italy	11 September 1994
Olympic record	Yang Wenyi (CHN)	24.79	Barcelona, Spain	31 July 1992

== Results ==
=== Heats ===
Rule: The eight fastest swimmers advance to final A (Q), while the next eight to final B (q).

Rank	Heat	Lane	Name	Nationality	Time	Notes
1	7	4	Le Jingyi	China	25.10	Q
2	6	4	Amy Van Dyken	United States	25.12	Q
3	6	5	Sandra Völker	Germany	25.45	Q
4	5	4	Angel Martino	United States	25.47	Q
5	5	5	Shan Ying	China	25.71	Q
6	7	5	Natalya Meshcheryakova	Russia	25.73	Q
7	5	6	Leah Martindale	Barbados	25.76	Q
8	6	3	Linda Olofsson	Sweden	25.84	Q
9	5	3	Karen van Wirdum	Australia	25.88	q
10	7	3	Sumika Minamoto	Japan	25.89	q
11	6	6	Marianne Muis	Netherlands	25.93	q
12	5	7	Yevgeniya Yermakova	Kazakhstan	25.97	q, NR
13	6	2	Simone Osygus	Germany	26.00	q
13	7	6	Angela Postma	Netherlands	26.00	q
15	4	4	Laura Petrutytė	Lithuania	26.13	q, =NR
16	7	7	Claudia Franco	Spain	26.17	q
17	4	2	Vibeke Johansen	Norway	26.22	
18	7	1	Rania Elwani	Egypt	26.26	NR
19	7	8	Siobhan Cropper	Trinidad and Tobago	26.29	NR
20	4	6	Judith Draxler	Austria	26.34	
20	5	2	Sarah Ryan	Australia	26.34	
22	4	5	Blanca Cerón	Spain	26.39	
22	6	1	Sue Rolph	Great Britain	26.39	
24	5	1	Marianne Kriel	South Africa	26.42	
25	4	7	Metka Sparavec	Slovenia	26.43	
26	4	3	Martine Dessureault	Canada	26.44	
27	6	7	Luminița Dobrescu	Romania	26.47	
28	4	8	Mette Nielsen	Denmark	26.50	
29	4	1	Casey Legler	France	26.52	
29	7	2	Laura Nicholls	Canada	26.52	
31	5	8	Dita Želvienė	Lithuania	26.55	
32	3	8	Dominique Diezi	Switzerland	26.57	NR
33	3	2	Eileen Coparropa	Panama	26.67	
34	3	4	Minna Salmela	Finland	26.72	
35	2	4	Alison Fitch	New Zealand	26.74	
36	3	1	Monica Dahl	Namibia	26.76	
37	3	6	Elín Sigurðardóttir	Iceland	26.90	
38	6	8	Lin Chien-ju	Chinese Taipei	27.00	
39	3	5	Valeria Álvarez	Argentina	27.12	
40	1	5	Alena Popchanka	Belarus	27.18	NR
41	2	1	Seo So-yung	South Korea	27.30	NR
42	2	2	Gyöngyvér Lakos	Hungary	27.34	
43	2	5	Teresa Moodie	Zimbabwe	27.38	
44	3	3	Joscelin Yeo	Singapore	27.51	
45	2	8	Duška Radan	FR Yugoslavia	27.62	NR
46	2	3	Gabrijela Ujčić	Croatia	27.63	
47	2	7	Agnese Ozoliņa	Latvia	27.65	
48	1	3	Sangeeta Puri	India	28.02	
49	1	2	Verónica Prono	Paraguay	28.40	
50	1	4	Gail Rizzo	Malta	28.43	
51	2	6	Akiko Thomson	Philippines	28.51	
52	1	6	Võ Trần Trường An	Vietnam	29.02	
53	1	7	Ingrid Louis	Mauritius	29.56	
54	1	1	Monika Bakale	Republic of the Congo	34.43	
55	1	8	Nishma Gurung	Nepal	41.45	
	3	7	Antonia Machaira	Greece	DNS	

=== Finals ===
==== Final B ====
Rank	Lane	Name	Nationality	Time	Notes
9	3	Marianne Muis	Netherlands	25.74	
10	2	Angela Postma	Netherlands	25.82	
11	8	Claudia Franco	Spain	26.04	
12	5	Sumika Minamoto	Japan	26.05	
13	6	Yevgeniya Yermakova	Kazakhstan	26.06	
14	7	Simone Osygus	Germany	26.16	
15	4	Karen van Wirdum	Australia	26.17	
16	1	Laura Petrutytė	Lithuania	26.36	

==== Final A ====
Rank	Lane	Name	Nationality	Time	Notes
1st place, gold medalist(s)	5	Amy Van Dyken	United States	24.87	AM
2nd place, silver medalist(s)	4	Le Jingyi	China	24.90	
3rd place, bronze medalist(s)	3	Sandra Völker	Germany	25.14	
4	6	Angel Martino	United States	25.31	
5	1	Leah Martindale	Barbados	25.49	NR
6	8	Linda Olofsson	Sweden	25.63	
7	2	Shan Ying	China	25.70	
7	7	Natalya Meshcheryakova	Russia	25.70	
