= Swimming at the 2000 Summer Olympics – Women's 4 × 100 metre freestyle relay =

Women's 4 × 100 metre freestyle relay at the Games of the XXVII Olympiad
- Venue: Sydney International Aquatic Centre
- Dates: 16 September 2000 (heats & final)
- Competitors: 61 from 13 nations
- Teams: 13
- Winning time: 3:36.61 WR

Medalists
1st place, gold medalist(s)		Amy Van Dyken, Dara Torres, Courtney Shealy, Jenny Thompson, Erin Phenix*, Ashley Tappin*	United States
2nd place, silver medalist(s)		Manon van Rooijen, Wilma van Rijn, Thamar Henneken, Inge de Bruijn, Chantal Groot*	Netherlands
3rd place, bronze medalist(s)		Johanna Sjöberg, Therese Alshammar, Louise Jöhncke, Anna-Karin Kammerling, Josefin Lillhage*, Malin Svahnström*; *Indicates the swimmer only competed in the preliminary heats.	Sweden

The women's 4 × 100 metre freestyle relay event at the 2000 Summer Olympics took place on 16 September at the Sydney International Aquatic Centre in Sydney, Australia.

The U.S. women's team dominated the race from the start to break the six-year-old world record and most importantly, to defend an Olympic title in the event. The foursome of Amy Van Dyken (55.08), Dara Torres (53.51), Courtney Shealy (54.40), and Jenny Thompson (53.62) put together a stellar time of 3:36.61 to capture the relay gold medal, shaving off China's 1994 world record by 1.3 seconds. As the Americans celebrated their triumph in the pool, Thompson picked up her eighth career medal to become the nation's most successful woman in Olympic history. She also tied with former East Germany's Kristin Otto for the most golds by a female, a total of six.

The Netherlands nearly pulled a worst-to-first effort, building from an eighth-place turn by Manon van Rooijen (56.35), seventh by Wilma van Rijn (55.19), and sixth by Thamar Henneken (54.88) until they delivered rising star Inge de Bruijn for the final exchange. Swimming the anchor leg, De Bruijn surged powerfully past the entire field with a fastest split of 53.41 to take home the silver for the Dutch in a European record of 3:39.83. Meanwhile, Sweden's Louise Jöhncke (55.93), Therese Alshammar (53.78), Johanna Sjöberg (55.06), and Anna-Karin Kammerling (55.58) came up with a spectacular swim to grab a bronze in 3:40.30, a national record, holding off a sprint battle from the fast-pacing German team of Antje Buschschulte (55.67), Katrin Meissner (54.92), Franziska van Almsick (55.02), and Sandra Völker (54.70) by a hundredth of a second.

Great Britain's Karen Pickering (56.01), Alison Sheppard (54.95), Rosalind Brett (54.92), and Sue Rolph (54.66) pulled off a fifth-place finish in 3:40.54. Susie O'Neill recorded a split of 54.79 to produce a powerful lead on the first length by the delight of a home crowd, but the Aussies settled only for sixth place with a time of 3:40.91. Canada (3:42.92) and Italy (3:44.49) rounded out the championship finale.

== Records ==
Prior to this competition, the existing world and Olympic records were as follows.

World record	China (CHN); Le Ying (54.31); Shan Ying (54.38); Lü Bin (55.09); Le Jingyi (54.13)	3:37.91	Rome, Italy	7 September 1994
Olympic record	United States; Angel Martino (55.34); Amy Van Dyken (53.91); Catherine Fox (55.93); Jenny Thompson (54.11)	3:39.29	Atlanta, United States	22 July 1996

The following new world and Olympic records were set during this competition.

Date	Event	Name	Nationality	Time	Record
September 16	Final	Amy Van Dyken (55.08); Dara Torres (53.51); Courtney Shealy (54.40); Jenny Thompson (53.62)	United States	3:36.61	WR

== Results ==
=== Heats ===
Rank	Heat	Lane	Nation	Swimmers	Time	Notes
1	2	4	United States	Ashley Tappin (55.47); Erin Phenix (56.02); Courtney Shealy (54.99); Amy Van Dyken (54.40)	3:40.88	Q
2	2	6	Netherlands	Manon van Rooijen (56.15); Chantal Groot (56.07); Thamar Henneken (54.99); Wilma van Rijn (55.11)	3:42.32	Q
3	1	4	Great Britain	Alison Sheppard (56.16); Rosalind Brett (55.63); Karen Pickering (55.29); Sue Rolph (55.39)	3:42.47	Q
4	2	5	Germany	Katrin Meissner (55.22); Britta Steffen (55.77); Daniela Samulski (56.18); Kerstin Kielgass (56.05)	3:43.22	Q
5	2	3	Australia	Elka Graham (56.81); Sarah Ryan (54.94); Melanie Dodd (56.31); Giaan Rooney (55.50)	3:43.56	Q
6	1	5	Sweden	Louise Jöhncke (56.27); Josefin Lillhage (57.00); Malin Svahnström (56.73); Therese Alshammar (53.77)	3:43.77	Q
7	1	3	Canada	Marianne Limpert (55.87); Shannon Shakespeare (55.80); Jessica Deglau (56.23); Laura Nicholls (55.92)	3:43.82	Q
8	1	6	Italy	Cecilia Vianini (56.10); Luisa Striani (56.29); Sara Parise (55.73); Cristina Chiuso (55.85)	3:43.97	Q
9	2	7	China	Han Xue (56.99); Li Jin (56.88); Sun Dan (57.25); Yang Yu (55.50)	3:46.62	
10	1	7	Russia	Lyubov Yudina (57.74); Marina Chepurkova (56.79); Yekaterina Kibalo (56.02); Inna Yaitskaya (56.24)	3:46.79	
11	2	2	Belgium	Nina van Koeckhoven (56.62); Liesbet Dreesen (56.69); Sofie Goffin (56.72); Tine Bossuyt (56.88)	3:46.91	
12	1	2	Romania	Florina Herea (57.28); Lorena Diaconescu (57.77); Diana Mocanu (57.26); Camelia Potec (56.47)	3:48.78	
13	2	1	Ukraine	Nadiya Beshevli (57.68); Valentyna Tregub (57.39); Olena Lapunova (57.60); Olga Mukomol (56.44)	3:49.11	

=== Final ===
Rank	Lane	Nation	Swimmers	Time	Time behind	Notes
1st place, gold medalist(s)	4	United States	Amy Van Dyken (55.08); Dara Torres (53.51); Courtney Shealy (54.40); Jenny Thompson (53.62)	3:36.61		WR
2nd place, silver medalist(s)	5	Netherlands	Manon van Rooijen (56.35); Wilma van Rijn (55.19); Thamar Henneken (54.88); Inge de Bruijn (53.41)	3:39.83	3.22	ER
3rd place, bronze medalist(s)	7	Sweden	Louise Jöhncke (55.93); Therese Alshammar (53.78); Johanna Sjöberg (55.06); Anna-Karin Kammerling (55.53)	3:40.30	3.69	NR
4	6	Germany	Antje Buschschulte (55.67); Katrin Meissner (54.92); Franziska van Almsick (55.02); Sandra Völker (54.70)	3:40.31	3.70	NR
5	3	Great Britain	Karen Pickering (56.01); Alison Sheppard (54.95); Rosalind Brett (54.92); Sue Rolph (54.66)	3:40.54	3.93	
6	2	Australia	Susie O'Neill (54.79) OC; Sarah Ryan (54.80); Elka Graham (55.57); Giaan Rooney (55.75)	3:40.91	4.30	OC
7	1	Canada	Marianne Limpert (56.32); Shannon Shakespeare (55.10); Laura Nicholls (55.30); Jessica Deglau (56.20)	3:42.92	6.31	
8	8	Italy	Cecilia Vianini (55.96); Luisa Striani (56.22); Sara Parise (55.88); Cristina Chiuso (56.43)	3:44.49	7.88	
