= 1993 FINA World Swimming Championships (25 m) – Women's 4 × 100 metre freestyle relay =

The finals and the qualifying heats of the Women's 4 × 100 metres Freestyle Relay event at the 1993 FINA Short Course World Championships were held in Palma de Mallorca, Spain.

== Final ==
Rank	Final	Time
	China; Lü Bin; Shan Ying; Jia Yuanyuan; Le Jingyi	3:35.97 WR
	Sweden; Ellenor Svensson; Linda Olofsson; Suzanne Lööv; Louise Jöhncke	3:39.41
	United States; Angel Martino; Sarah Perroni; Kristie Krueger; Paige Wilson	3:40.40
4.	Australia; Susie O'Neill; Anna Windsor; Petria Thomas; Elli Overton	3:42.88
5.	Canada; Shannon Shakespeare; Patricia Levesque; Jessica Amey; Joanne Malar	3:43.00
6.	South Africa; Marianne Kriel; Tracy Elliot; Karen Allers; Jill Brukman	3:49.18

== See also ==
- 1992 Women's Olympic Games 4 × 100 m Freestyle Relay
- 1993 Women's European LC Championships 4 × 100 m Freestyle Relay
