= Chang Wei-chia =

Taiwanese swimmer (born 1981)

Personal information
- Native name: 張緯嘉
- Born: 24 February 1981 (age 45)

Sport
- Sport: Swimming

Chang Wei-chia
- Traditional Chinese: 張緯嘉
- Simplified Chinese: 张纬嘉
Transcriptions
Standard Mandarin
- Hanyu Pinyin: Zhāng Wěijiā
- Wade–Giles: Chang^{1} Wei^{3}-chia^{1}
Yue: Cantonese
- Jyutping: Zoeng1 Wai5gaa1

Chang Wei-chia (traditional Chinese: 張緯嘉; simplified Chinese: 张纬嘉; born 24 February 1981) is a Taiwanese freestyle swimmer. She competed in three events at the 1996 Summer Olympics. In the 200m freestyle, she placed 32nd.

When she was in the fourth grade, Chang started out training as a gymnast but because she was too tall, she withdrew from the sport. That same school year, she began training in swimming. Chang competed in several District Games, where she received numerous gold medals. During her competitions, she has conference records and national records. At the Pacific Ocean Games in 1995, she received a gold medal in the 400m freestyle relay, a silver medal in the 800m freestyle relay, and a silver medal in the 200m medley. During the Asian Swimming Championships in Bangkok in 1996, she received a bronze medal in the 400m freestyle relay. By the 2020s, Chang had become a swimming coach.

== Biography ==
Chang initially was chosen to be trained in gymnastics when she was in fourth grade at Taipei's Yucheng Elementary School (Chinese: 玉成國小). Since the coach thought she was too tall, she withdrew from the sport. The same school year, the swimming coach Tsai Tzu-hsiu (Chinese: 蔡祖修) invited Chang to begin training in swimming after he noticed her large hands and feet. The National Swimming Association (Chinese: 全國泳協) in June 1990 chose Chang to compete in the Asia-Pacific Age Group Swimming Invitational Championships (Chinese: 亞太分齡游泳邀請賽) in Jakarta. On 31 August 1990, she competed in the championships in the 50m breaststroke in the under 10 years old category and won a silver medal with a time of 38.82 seconds. Chang represented Yucheng Elementary School at the Zhongzheng Cup Swimming Competition (Chinese: 中正杯游泳賽) held at the Kaohsiung Cianjin Sports Center. In the 50m backstroke in the elementary school upper division, she set a conference record with a time of 35.92 seconds. During the National Youth Swimming Championships (Chinese: 全國青少年游泳賽) held in May 1991 at National Taiwan University Sports Center's swimming pool, Chang represented Yucheng Elementary School. She earned seven gold medals, the highest number of any competitor. Chang competed at the National Age-Group Swimming Championships (Chinese: 全國分齡游泳錦標賽) held at the National Taiwan University Sports Center's swimming pool in June 1991. In the 200m individual medley in the under 10 years old category, she set a conference record with a time of 2 minutes and 35.52 seconds. During the Asia-Pacific Age Group Swimming Championships (Chinese: 亞太分齡游泳賽) held in Singapore in September 1991, Chang received a bronze medal in the girls' 11–12 age group by swimming 1 minute and 20.38 seconds in the 100m freestyle. She received another bronze medal in the competition in the 100m breaststroke with a time of 1 minute and 18.6 seconds.

Chang was a first-year student at Taipei Municipal Nan-Gang High School in October 1991. Her elementary school coach, Tsai Tzu-hsiu, was brought on as the school's full-time swimming coach, allowing her to keep training with him. That month, she made her debut representing Taipei City in the District Games where she received five gold medals in the 200m individual medley, 200m backstroke, 200m breaststroke, 400m medley relay, and 400m freestyle relay. She was the female athlete at the District Games with the highest number of gold medals. Chang was ranked the first in the country in her age group in swimming in 1991. Chang transferred to Taipei Municipal Yong-Ji Junior High School in 1992 and continued practicing swimming daily at Yucheng Elementary School, the elementary school she had attended. She chose to attend Yong-Ji because of its proximity to home and its good swimming facilities and culture.

Chang competed at the Taiwan Regional High School Swimming Championship (Chinese: 台灣區中學運動會游泳賽) held at Kaohsiung Cianjin Sports Center in April 1992. In the girls' 200m breaststroke, she placed third with a time of 2 minutes and 49.82 seconds. Chang competed in the National Age-Group Swimming Championships (Chinese: 全國分齡游泳錦標賽) held at Taipei Physical Education College in June 1992. In the girls' 11–12 age group, she broke conference records in the 200m individual medley (2 minutes and 23.86 seconds) and 200m backstroke (2 minutes and 36.13 seconds). At the competition, she received nine individual gold medals and two team gold medals. During the Asia-Pacific Age-Group Swimming Championships (Chinese: 亞太分齡游泳錦標賽) held in Beijing in August 1992, in the girls' 11–12 age group, Chang received a bronze medal in the 100m breaststroke event with a time of 1 minute and 18.27 seconds and a silver medal in the 100m freestyle event with a time of 1 minute and 1.26 seconds. In September 1992, Taipei mayor Huang Ta-chou gave her an "outstanding athlete" award at the Taipei City Nine-Nine Sports Festival (Chinese: 台北市九九體育節慶祝會).

Chang competed at the National Zhongzheng Cup Age-Group Swimming Competition (Chinese: 全國中正杯分齡游泳賽) in September 1992 at the Changhua County Stadium swimming pool in the 11–12 age group. She set three meet records in the 100m backstroke (1 minute and 13.69 seconds), 100m breaststroke (1 minute and 18.62 seconds), and 100m freestyle (1 minute and 8 seconds). Her fourth win was in the 400m freestyle. During the District Games held in Yilan in October 1992, she set a national record in the 100m freestyle with a time of 1 minute and 0.38 seconds. In the 400m medley relay, she and her teammates set a national record with a time of 4 minutes and 37.25 seconds. She won five individual gold medals, two relay gold medals, and two silver medals. During the competition, she wore a swimsuit with the same design as that worn by the Japanese team in the 1992 Summer Olympics. According to the United Daily News, the swimsuit's gold-colored parts on the chest and hips have "a fine-grooved design to increase water flow speed". The newspaper said the swimsuit's design was her "secret weapon" in breaking records.

By 1995, Chang was a student at Taipei Municipal Song Shan Senior High School. She represented the school at the Taipei City High School Sports Meet (Chinese: 台北市中學) held at the Taipei Municipal Stadium. She set two meet records in the 200m and 400m individual medley events, in both of which she received gold. Chang represented Taiwan at the Pacific Ocean Games in 1995. She and her three teammates set a national record when they received a gold medal in the 400m freestyle relay with a time of 4 minutes and 2.612 seconds. They received a silver medal in the 800m freestyle relay. Chang also received a silver medal in the 200m medley with a time of 2 minutes and 28.27 seconds. She and her three teammates received a bronze medal in the 400m freestyle relay in the Asian Swimming Championships in Bangkok in 1996. With a time of 3 minutes and 54.45 seconds, they broke the previous national record of 4 minutes and 2.16 seconds. During the 1996 District Games, Chang received the most gold medals. She received gold medals in three individual events (100m freestyle, 200m freestyle, and 200m medley) and two relay events (400m freestyle and 800m freestyle).

Chang competed in the 1996 Summer Olympics. She was eliminated in the 200m freestyle after swimming 2 minutes and 6.94 seconds in the primaries which placed her 35th out of 42 contestants. Chang competed in the Taipei City High School Sports Swimming Competition (Chinese: 北市中學運動會游泳賽) in March 1997 and set five meet records. Chang attended National Taiwan Normal University. Min Sheng Bao said that she was expected to represent the university in the National University Games (Chinese: 大專運動會) in March 1999 and win the gold medal in the 400m individual medley. Owing to being ill, Chang did not participate in the competition. By the 2020s, Chang was a swimming coach in Yilan.
