= Ingrid Louis =

Mauritian swimmer

Personal information
- Born: September 23, 1977 (age 48)

Sport
- Sport: Swimming

Ingrid Louis (born 23 September 1977) is a former swimmer who competed for Mauritius in the 1996 Summer Olympic Games.

== Career ==
Louis began swimming in 1985 after the Indian Ocean Island Games. She competed in the women's 50 metre freestyle finishing 53rd out of 55 competitors with a time of 29.56 seconds. She retired in 2002 and became an insurance agent after working in shipping and marketing.
