= Martine Dessureault =

Canadian swimmer

Personal information
- Born: March 2, 1974 (age 52) Montreal, Canada

Sport
- Sport: Swimming

Martine Dessureault (born 2 March 1974) is a Canadian former swimmer who represented Canada at the 1996 Summer Olympic Games.

== Career ==
Dessureault was born in Montreal, Quebec. She was trained by Éric Kramer. At the 1996 Summer Olympic Games Dessureault finished 26th out of 55 swimmers in the women's 50 metre freestyle with a time of 26.44 seconds.
