= Marja Heikkilä =

Finnish swimmer

Personal information
- Full name: Marja Elina Heikkilä
- Nationality: Finland
- Born: September 12, 1977 (age 48) Haapajärvi
- Height: 1.68 m (5 ft 6 in)
- Weight: 62 kg (137 lb)

Sport
- Sport: Swimming
- Strokes: Freestyle
- Club: Swimming Jyväskylä, Oulun uimaseura

Marja Heikkilä (born September 12, 1977 in Haapajärvi) is a former freestyle swimmer from Finland, who competed for her native country at the 1996 Summer Olympics in Atlanta, Georgia. There she finished in 16th place with the 4×100 m freestyle relay team, alongside Paula Harmokivi, Marja Pärssinen, and Minna Salmela.
