= Manon van Rooijen =

Dutch swimmer (born 1982)

Personal information
- Full name: Manon van Rooijen
- Nationality: Netherlands
- Born: 3 July 1982 (age 44) Leerdam, Netherlands
- Height: 1.78 m (5 ft 10 in)
- Weight: 63.5 kg (140 lb)

Sport
- Sport: Swimming
- Strokes: freestyle
- Club: Nationaal Zweminstituut Amsterdam
- College team: University of Miami
Medal record
Women's swimming
Representing the Netherlands
Olympic Games
Gold medal – first place	2008 Beijing	4×100 m freestyle
Silver medal – second place	2000 Sydney	4×100 m freestyle
European Championships (LC)
Bronze medal – third place	2002 Berlin	4×100 m freestyle

Manon van Rooijen (born 3 July 1982 in Leerdam) is a freestyle swimmer from the Netherlands. She was a member of the Dutch women's 4 × 100 m freestyle relay team (alongside Inge de Bruijn, Wilma van Hofwegen and Thamar Henneken) that won the silver medal at the 2000 Summer Olympics in Sydney, Australia.

== Swimming career ==
Van Rooijen made her international senior debut at the European LC Championships 1999 in Istanbul, Turkey with 4th-place finishes in both 4 × 100 m freestyle and 4 × 100 m medley relay. One year later she started again in the European LC Championships this time it took place in Helsinki, Finland. There she started individually in the 100 m and 200 m freestyle ending up 17th and 24th. In the 4 × 200 m freestyle relay there was a 7th place. In September 2000 she competed at the Sydney Olympics where she won a silver medal in 4 × 100 m freestyle relay together with Inge de Bruijn, Wilma van Hofwegen and Thamar Henneken. There was also an 11th place in the 4 × 200 m freestyle.

=== Post-Sydney Olympics ===
Van Rooijen left for the United States in January 2001 to study at the University of Miami. She kept her place in the national team during the 2001 World Aquatics Championships in Fukuoka, Japan which turned out to be a disappointment. In both relays, 4 × 100 m and 4 × 200 m freestyle, she and her team were eliminated in the heats. She reached her first individual final in 2002 in Berlin at the 2002 European Aquatics Championships finishing 8th in the 200 m freestyle. There was also a bronze medal for her in the 4 × 100 m freestyle relay together with Marleen Veldhuis, Chantal Groot and Wilma van Hofwegen and a 5th place in the 4 × 200 m freestyle. At the 2003 World Aquatics Championships in Barcelona she just missed out for a world championship medal by finishing 4th in the 4 × 100 m freestyle. She also achieved a 7th place in the 4×200 freestyle. After three years she returned home and found a place in Dordrecht, with Topzwemmen West-Nederland under the guidance of trainer-coach Dick Bergsma but failed to qualify for the 2004 Summer Olympics due to a severe shoulder injury.

=== Comeback ===
After she missed out all international tournaments in 2004 and 2005 she returned to international competition in Budapest to compete in the 2006 European Aquatics Championships. Meanwhile, she started to train with the Nationaal Zweminstituut Amsterdam where she is coached by Martin Truijens. She only started in the 4 × 200 m free ending up with an 11th place. Although she didn't meet the qualifying standards she was selected for the 2007 World Aquatics Championships in Melbourne, Australia and started in the 4 × 200 m freestyle relay which reached the final and ended third.

=== 2008 ===
In 2008, she took part in the 2008 European Aquatics Championships in front of her home crowd in Eindhoven. Individually she started in the 200 m freestyle where she was eliminated in the heats but qualified for the 2008 Summer Olympics in the 4 × 200 m relay. A time-trial in the 100 m freestyle secured her a spot in the olympic 4 × 100 m freestyle team. She also started in the 4 × 200 m freestyle but she and Linda Bank were replaced by Inge Dekker and Marleen Veldhuis for the final.

At the 2008 Summer Olympics she started in the heats of the 4×100 freestyle relay alongside Ranomi Kromowidjojo, Femke Heemskerk and Hinkelien Schreuder. But she and Schreuder were replaced for the final by Inge Dekker and Marleen Veldhuis. Van Rooijen saw her teammates win the final and received a gold medal for her efforts in the heats. Together with Heemskerk, Kromowidjojo and Saskia de Jonge she swam the heats of the 4 × 200 m freestyle but they failed to qualify for the final.

== Personal bests ==
Short course
Event	Time	Date	Location
50 m freestyle	25.78	2008-06-22	Alkmaar, Netherlands
100 m freestyle	55.51	2008-04-05	Amsterdam, Netherlands
200 m freestyle	1:59.15	2008-04-05	Amsterdam, Netherlands

Long course
Event	Time	Date	Location
50 m freestyle	26.37	2007-12-08	Eindhoven, Netherlands
100 m freestyle	55.07	2008-03-19	Eindhoven, Netherlands
200 m freestyle	2:00.28	2002-08-02	Berlin, Germany

== See also ==
- Dutch records in swimming
- List of swimmers
