= Anu Koivisto =

Finnish swimmer (born 1980)

Personal information
- Full name: Anu Elisa Koivisto
- Nationality: Finland
- Born: 9 May 1980 (age 46) Helsinki, Finland
- Height: 1.69 m (5 ft 7 in)
- Weight: 58 kg (128 lb)

Sport
- Sport: Swimming
- Strokes: Backstroke
- Club: Simmis
Medal record
Women's swimming
European Championships (SC)
Silver medal – second place	2001 Antwerp	50 m backstroke
Bronze medal – third place	2001 Antwerp	200 m backstroke

Anu Elisa Koivisto (born 9 May 1980) is a 2-time Olympic swimmer from Finland. She swam for Finland at the 1996 and 2000 Olympics. During her swimming career, she swam to multiple Finnish championships and national records.

At the 1996 Olympics she was part of Finland's women's 4×100 Medley Relay, alongside Mia Hagman, Minna Salmela, and Marja Pärssinen.

Koivisto lives in Oslo, Norway with the retired Norwegian swimmer Børge Mørk. She has a dietitian's license and works for Norway's Olympiatoppen. The couple has two children, Kia and Alexis, and has caused controversy for being an anti-vaccinationist and not allowing her children to be vaccinated.

== Medals ==
- European Short Course Swimming Championships 2001: silver (50m backstroke) and bronze (200m backstroke)

== Finnish records ==
At one time Koivisto held the following Finnish Records:
Long Course (50m)

- 200 Backstroke 2.14,92 (February 1, 1998, Greve)
- 4×50 Freestyle Relay national team 1.47,68 (January 29, 1999, Greve)
- 4×50 Medley Relay national team 1.59,93 (January 31, 1999, Greve)
- 4×100 Medley Relay national team 4.14,14 (July 24, 1996 Atlanta)

Short Course (25m)

- 50 Backstroke 27,75 (December 15, 2001, Antwerp)
- 200 Backstroke 2.07,10 (December 16, 2001, Antwerp)
