= Verónica Prono =

Paraguayan swimmer

Personal information
- Born: January 12, 1978 (age 48)

Sport
- Sport: Swimming

Verónica Prono Tonanez (born 12 January 1978) is a former swimmer who represented Paraguay internationally.

== Career ==
Prono began swimming at the age of four. At thirteen she started to compete internationally for Paraguay. She won the Fair Play Award from the Paraguayan Olympic Committee in 1995. She became the first female swimmer to represent Paraguay in the Summer Olympics when she finished 49th in the women's 50 metre freestyle in 1996.

== Personal life ==
She is a teacher and a Bachelor of Business Administration. Prono has a swimming academy named after her.

Her nephew Genaro is also a swimmer.
