= Siobhan Cropper =

Trinidad and Tobago swimmer

Personal information
- Full name: Siobhan Trichelle Cropper
- National team: Trinidad and Tobago
- Born: 13 April 1978 (age 48) Saint James, Trinidad and Tobago
- Height: 1.90 m (6 ft 3 in)
- Weight: 62 kg (137 lb)

Sport
- Sport: Swimming
- Strokes: Freestyle, butterfly
- College team: Stanford Cardinal (U.S.)
- Coach: Richard Quick (U.S.)
Medal record
Women's swimming
Representing Trinidad and Tobago
Central American and Caribbean Games
Gold medal – first place	1998 Maracaibo	100 m butterfly
Silver medal – second place	1993 Ponce	50 m freestyle
Silver medal – second place	1993 Ponce	100 m freestyle
Silver medal – second place	1998 Maracaibo	50 m freestyle

Siobhan Trichelle Cropper (born April 13, 1978) is a 2-time Olympian and swimmer from Trinidad and Tobago, who specialized in sprint freestyle and butterfly events. Cropper represented Trinidad and Tobago in two editions of the Olympic Games (1996 and 2000), and eventually captured the 100 m butterfly title at the 1998 Central American and Caribbean Games in Maracaibo, Venezuela. She also holds three Trinidadian records in a sprint freestyle and butterfly double (both 50 and 100 m), two NCAA championship titles and fourteen All-American honors, while attending Stanford University.

== Career ==
=== Early years and education ===
Cropper was born in Saint James, Trinidad and Tobago, the daughter of Anthony and Vilma Cropper. Started her sporting career at age six, she produced numerous age group and meet records in all swimming strokes (freestyle, backstroke, breaststroke, and butterfly). In 1993, she attained silver medals in both 50 m freestyle (26.93) and 100 m freestyle (58.78) at the Central American and Caribbean Games in Ponce, Puerto Rico. As a teenager, Cropper attended St. Joseph's Convent in Port of Spain, where she swam and trained for Hayden Newallo.

Cropper accepted an athletic scholarship to attend Stanford University in Stanford, California, where she swam for Richard Quick as a member of the Stanford Cardinal swimming and diving team from 1997 to 2001. While swimming for the Cardinal, she held school records in the 50-yard freestyle (22.54), 100-yard freestyle (49.65), and 100-yard butterfly (54.46), and received a total of fourteen All-American honors in her entire college career. At the 1998 NCAA Women's Swimming and Diving Championships, during her freshman season, Cropper helped the Cardinals set meet records and capture two titles each in the 200-yard medley relay (1:37.80), and in the 400-yard medley relay (3:33.61).

=== International career ===
Cropper made her first Trinidad and Tobago Olympic team, as an eighteen-year-old junior, at the 1996 Summer Olympics in Atlanta. There, she missed reaching the top 16 final in one of her individual events, finishing nineteenth in the 50 m freestyle (26.29), and twenty-sixth in the 100 m freestyle (57.30) Cropper and her training partner leading up to the 1996 Olympic Games, Leah Martindale, were both coached by Anil Roberts for the 1996 Olympic Games.

At the 1997 FINA Short Course World Championships in Gothenburg, Sweden, Cropper made the final and established a Trinidad and Tobago national record of 25.68, placing eighth in the 50 m freestyle. The following year, at the 1998 Central American and Caribbean Games in Maracaibo, Venezuela, Cropper collected a total of two medals: a gold in the 100 m butterfly (1:03.01; a meet record), and a silver in the 50 m freestyle (26.40).

Cropper competed in three individual events at the 2000 Summer Olympics in Sydney. She qualifies for the Olympic Games with 26.54 (50 m freestyle), 58.44 (100 m freestyle), and 1:02.76 (100 m butterfly) at the Pan American Games in Winnipeg, Manitoba, Canada. On the first day of the Games, Cropper placed fortieth in the 100 m butterfly. Swimming in heat three, she completed the event with a personal best of 1:02.34. Four days later, in the 100 m freestyle, Cropper lowered her lifetime record to 57.91 from heat two, finishing slightly behind leader Leah Martindale of Barbados, a finalist in Atlanta four years earlier. In her third event, 50 m freestyle, Cropper posted a time of 26.36 from heat six for a thirty-second overall seed, but missed the semifinals by just half a second (0.50).

== Life after swimming ==
In the spring of 2001, Cropper graduated from Stanford University with a Bachelor of Arts degree in economics, ending her swimming career with two Olympic editions and a top eight finish at the World Swimming Championships. In 2004, Cropper was inducted into the Trinidad and Tobago's Sports Hall of Fame. She then added to her achievements an Ivy League MBA degree (Master of Business Administration) from the prestigious Columbia University in New York City in 2007, and eventually worked as a financial consultant with the World Bank in Washington, D.C.

== See also ==
- Stanford Cardinal
- List of Stanford University people
- List of Trinidad and Tobago records in swimming
