= Supra Singhal =

Ugandan-Indian swimmer (born 1982)

Supra Singhal (Supra Agarwal)
Personal information
- Nationality: Uganda
- Born: 2 March 1982 (age 44) Kampala, Uganda
- Height: 1.63 m (5 ft 4 in)
- Weight: 48 kg (106 lb)

Sport
- Sport: Swimming
- Strokes: Freestyle

Supra Agarwal née Singhal (born 2 March 1982, in Kampala) is a former Ugandan-Indian swimmer, who specialized in sprint freestyle events. She competed in the women's 100 m freestyle at the 2000 Summer Olympics.

== Career ==
Singhal competed for Uganda in the women's 100 m freestyle at the 2000 Summer Olympics in Sydney. She received a ticket from FINA, under a Universality program, in an entry time of 59.20. She challenged seven other swimmers in heat one, including 15-year-olds Maria Awori of Kenya Nathalie Lee Baw of Mauritius. Entering the race with the fastest-seeded time, she faded down the stretch to pick up a sixth seed in a poor time of 1:08.15. Singhal's swim had also been overshadowed by fever and arm sprain that shortened her time for proper training and concentration. Singhal failed to advance into the semifinals, as she placed fifty-second overall in the prelims.

In her early career, Supra was the Uganda national champion for 4 years running from 1996 to 2000. She also bagged 12 gold medals in the East Africa Swimming Championships held in Mombasa, Kenya in 1997. Supra also represented Uganda at the Commonwealth Games in Kuala Lumpur, Malaysia in 1998.

== Personal life ==
Currently Supra lives in New Delhi and, alongside her husband Varun Agarwal, runs a chain of successful restaurants in Delhi called Not Just Paranthas (NJP).
