= Leah Martindale =

Barbadian swimmer (born 1978)

Personal information
- Full name: Leah Simone Martindale-Stancil
- National team: Barbados
- Born: 27 June 1978 (age 48) Bridgetown, Barbados
- Height: 1.81 m (5 ft 11 1/2 in)
- Weight: 76 kg (168 lb)

Sport
- Sport: Swimming
- Strokes: Freestyle, butterfly
- Club: Pirates Swim Club
- College team: University of Florida (USA)
- Coach: Gregg Troy (USA)

Leah Simone Martindale-Stancil (born June 27, 1978) is a Barbadian former competition swimmer who specialized in sprint freestyle and butterfly events. Martindale represented Barbados in two editions of the Olympic Games (1996 and 2000), where she became the first black female in history to reach an Olympic swimming final in the 50 m freestyle. She also holds three Barbadian records in a sprint freestyle double (50 and 100 m) and in the 50 m butterfly, and twelve All-American honors, while attending the University of Florida.

== Career ==
=== Early years and education ===
Martindale was born in Bridgetown, Barbados, the daughter of Alfred and Claire Martindale. She began swimming seriously at the age of five with the Pirates Club, coached by Marlyn Ouimet. As a teenager, Martindale attended The St. Michael School in Bridgetown, where she held numerous meet records in the 50-yard freestyle, 100-yard freestyle, 100-yard butterfly, and 200-yard butterfly. After graduating from high school in 1994, she left her native country Barbados to train and live on a sporting camp in Trinidad and Tobago, and eventually continued her journey for the Olympics.

Martindale attended the University of Florida in Gainesville, Florida, where she swam for coach Gregg Troy as a member of the Florida Gators swimming and diving team from 1998 to 2002. While swimming for the Gators, she held school records in the 50-yard freestyle (22.58), 100-yard freestyle (49.10), and 100-yard butterfly (55.97) from the 2001 Southeastern Conference Championships, and received a total of twelve All-American honors in her entire college career. During her senior year, Martindale helped the Gators pull off a seventh-place finish in the 200-yard freestyle relay (1:40.24) at the 2002 NCAA Women's Swimming and Diving Championships, and second for the school record at the Southeastern Conference Championships (1:30.18).

=== International career ===
Martindale made her first Barbadian team, as an eighteen-year-old junior, at the 1996 Summer Olympics in Atlanta. There, she placed twelfth in the 100 m freestyle (56.03), and fifth in the 50 m freestyle (25.46), holding her distinction as the second black female in history after Dutchwoman Enith Brigitha to reach an Olympic swimming final. Because of her stellar performances in the pool, she was named Barbados National Athlete of the Year thrice (1995–1997), and later earned the Minister's and Service Award, respectfully.

At the 1997 FINA Short Course World Championships in Gothenburg, Sweden, Martindale established a Barbadian record of 25.32 to pull off a fifth-place effort in the 50 m freestyle, finishing off the podium by nearly half a second (0.50). The following year, at the 1998 FINA World Championships in Perth, Western Australia, Martindale shared a fifteenth seed with Great Britain's Sue Rolph in the 50 m freestyle (a matching time of 26.19).

Martindale competed again in a sprint freestyle double at the 2000 Summer Olympics in Sydney, Australia. She achieved FINA B-standards of 26.91 (50 m freestyle) and 58.36 (100 m freestyle) from the Pan American Games in Winnipeg, Manitoba. In the 100 m freestyle, Martindale placed twenty-fourth on the morning prelims. Swimming in heat two, she came up with a spectacular swim on the final length to a top seed in 57.21, sufficiently enough for her personal best. Two days later, in the 50 m freestyle, Martindale posted a time of 26.05 from heat six to share a twenty-third seed with Australia's home favorite Sarah Ryan in the prelims, but missed the semifinals by almost a tenth of a second (0.10).

At the 2001 FINA World Championships in Fukuoka, Japan, Martindale failed to reach the top 16 roster in any of her individual events, finishing twenty-sixth in the 50 m freestyle (26.15), and twenty-seventh in the 100 m freestyle (56.93).

== Life after swimming ==
Martindale graduated from the University of Florida with a bachelor of science degree in psychology in 2002, and later completed her master's degree in 2006. Martindale worked as an assistant volunteer at the University for two years, and eventually served as an assistant coach at the Savannah College of Art and Design in Savannah, Georgia, where she aided the women's team to a second-place finish and the men's to a third-place effort at the NAIA Swimming and Diving Championships. She also offered a full-time coaching position for the South Carolina Gamecocks at the University of South Carolina, before returning to her alma mater for the Gators in 2008.

Martindale married her longtime friend Michael Stancil in 2006, and they currently reside together in Baton Rouge, LA, with their children Noah, Emma, and Grace. Martindale is now associate head swim coach at Louisiana State University.

== See also ==
- List of University of Florida alumni
- List of University of Florida Olympians
