= Mia Hagman =

Finnish swimmer

Personal information
- Full name: Mia Kristiina Hagman
- Nationality: Finland
- Born: August 18, 1979 (age 46) Helsinki, Finland
- Height: 1.64 m (5 ft 5 in)
- Weight: 64 kg (141 lb)

Sport
- Sport: Swimming
- Strokes: Breaststroke
- Club: Simmis Hyvinkää

Mia Hagman (born August 18, 1979 in Helsinki, Finland) is a retired female breaststroke swimmer from Finland. Hagman competed for her native country at the 1996 Summer Olympics in Atlanta, Georgia. Her best result was a 14th place with the women's 4×100 m medley relay team at the 1996 Summer Olympics, alongside Minna Salmela, Anu Koivisto, and Marja Pärssinen.
