= Kalle Varonen =

Finnish swimmer

Personal information
- Full name: Kalle Petteri Varonen
- Nationality: Finland
- Born: April 11, 1974 (age 52) Ulvila, Finland
- Height: 1.91 m (6 ft 3 in)
- Weight: 83 kg (183 lb)

Sport
- Sport: Swimming
- Strokes: Freestyle

Kalle Varonen (born April 11, 1974, in Ulvila, Finland) is a retired freestyle sprint swimmer from Finland. Varonen competed for his native country at 1996 Summer Olympics in Atlanta, Georgia. His best result was a 12th place with the men's 4×100 metres freestyle relay team, alongside Jani Sievinen, Antti Kasvio, and Janne Blomqvist.
