= Thamar Henneken =

Dutch swimmer (born 1979)

Personal information
- Full name: Thamar Nanette Henneken
- Nationality: Netherlands
- Born: 2 August 1979 (age 46) Delft, South Holland
- Height: 1.85 m (6 ft 1 in)
- Weight: 72 kg (159 lb)

Sport
- Sport: Swimming
- Strokes: Freestyle
- Club: PSV Eindhoven
Medal record
Women's swimming
Representing the Netherlands
Olympic Games
| Silver medal – second place | 2000 Sydney | 4×100 m freestyle |
World Championships (SC)
| Silver medal – second place | 1999 Hong Kong | 4×100 m freestyle |

Thamar Nanette Henneken (born 2 August 1979 in Delft, South Holland) is a former freestyle swimmer from the Netherlands. She was a member of the Dutch Women's 4 × 100 m freestyle relay team (alongside Inge de Bruijn, Wilma van Hofwegen and Manon van Rooijen) that won the silver medal at the 2000 Summer Olympics in Sydney, Australia.

After the Sydney Games, she tried to switch to rowing, but soon returned to swimming. She is engaged to former world champion Marcel Wouda. The couple had a baby in early 2005.
