= Janne Blomqvist =

Finnish swimmer

Personal information
- Full name: Janne Mikael Blomqvist
- Nationality: Finland
- Born: 6 May 1972 (age 54) Helsinki, Finland
- Height: 1.90 m (6 ft 3 in)
- Weight: 83 kg (183 lb)

Sport
- Sport: Swimming
- Strokes: Freestyle
- Club: Marjaniemen Uimarit, Helsinki

Janne Blomqvist (born 6 May 1972) is a retired freestyle sprint swimmer from Finland. Blomqvist was born in Helsinki, and competed for his native country at two consecutive Summer Olympics, starting in 1992 in Barcelona, Spain. His best result was a 12th place with the men's 4×100 metres freestyle relay team at the 1996 Summer Olympics, alongside Jani Sievinen, Antti Kasvio, and Kalle Varonen.
