= Laura Petrutytė =

Lithuanian swimmer (born 1976)

Personal information
- Born: August 10, 1976 (age 49)

Sport
- Sport: Swimming
- College team: Florida Atlantic University

Laura Petrutytė (born 10 August 1976) is a Lithuanian former competitive swimmer.

== Career ==
Petrutytė competed at the 1994 World Aquatics Championships and set a personal best time of 26.55 in the 50 m freestyle. She set national records in the 50 m freestyle in 1994 (which stood until 2011) and the 1500 m freestyle. At the 1996 Summer Olympic Games Petrutytė finished 16th in the women's 50 metre freestyle with a new national record time of 26.13 and 41st in the women's 200 metre freestyle. Petrutytė attended Florida Atlantic University and took part in the 1997 NCAA Division I Women's Swimming and Diving Championships.
