= Olena Lapunova =

Ukrainian swimmer (born 1980)

Personal information
- Full name: Olena Pavlivna Lapunova
- National team: Ukraine
- Born: 1 October 1980 (age 45) Dnipropetrovsk, Ukrainian SSR, Soviet Union
- Height: 1.75 m (5 ft 9 in)
- Weight: 65 kg (143 lb)

Sport
- Sport: Swimming
- Strokes: Freestyle, medley
- Club: ZS-Ukraina Dnipropetrovsk

Olena Pavlivna Lapunova (Ukrainian: Олена Павлівна Лапунова; born 1 October 1980) is a Ukrainian former swimmer, who specialized in freestyle and individual medley events. She is a three-time Olympian (1996, 2000, and 2004), an eighth-place finalist at the European Championships (1997), and a former Ukrainian record holder in the 200 m freestyle and individual medley.

Lapunova made her Olympic debut, as Ukraine's youngest swimmer (aged 15), at the 1996 Summer Olympics in Atlanta, Georgia. She placed twenty-first in the 200 m freestyle (2:04.07) and twenty-ninth in the 200 m individual medley (2:20.76).

In 1998, Lapunova ordered a four-year suspension from FINA, after she was tested positive for the banned metandienone metabolite. The Ukrainian Swimming Federation later reinstated her for an appeal in order to compete at the succeeding Olympics.

On her second Olympic appearance in Sydney 2000, Lapunova extended her program by qualifying for three swimming events. She failed to advance into the succeeding round of her individual events, finishing twenty-sixth in the 200 m freestyle (2:04.39) and thirty-second in the 400 m freestyle (4:19.96). She also placed thirteenth as a member of the Ukrainian team in the 4×100 m freestyle relay, with a time of 3:49.11.

Eight years after her first Olympics, Lapunova qualified for her third Ukrainian team, as a 23-year-old, at the 2004 Summer Olympics in Athens. She eclipsed her personal best and a FINA B-cut of 2:02.30 in the 200 m freestyle from the World Championships in Madrid, Spain. She edged out Switzerland's Hanna Miluska to lead the third heat by 0.57 of a second in 2:02.71. Lapunova failed to advance into the semifinals, placing twenty-second overall in the morning prelims.
