= Julia Greville =

Australian swimmer (born 1979)

Personal information
- Full name: Julia Emma Greville
- National team: Australia
- Born: 18 February 1979 (age 47) Perth, Western Australia
- Height: 1.78 m (5 ft 10 in)
- Weight: 67 kg (148 lb)

Sport
- Sport: Swimming
- Strokes: Freestyle
- Club: City of Perth Swim Club
Medal record
Women's swimming
Representing Australia
Olympic Games
Bronze medal – third place	1996 Atlanta	4×200 m freestyle
World Championships (LC)
Bronze medal – third place	1998 Perth	200 m freestyle
Bronze medal – third place	1998 Perth	4×200 m freestyle
World Championships (SC)
Bronze medal – third place	1997 Gothenburg	4×200 m freestyle
Pan Pacific Championships
Silver medal – second place	1995 Atlanta	4×200 m freestyle
Commonwealth Games
Gold medal – first place	1998 Kuala Lumpur	4×200 m freestyle

Julia Emma Greville (born 18 February 1979) is an Australian middle-distance freestyle swimmer who won a bronze medal in the 4×200-metre freestyle relay at the 1996 Summer Olympics.

Coming from Perth, Western Australia, Greville emerged onto the scene in 1995, winning the 200-metre freestyle at the Australian Championships and going on to win a silver medal in the 4×200-metre freestyle relay at the 1995 Pan Pacific Championships in Atlanta, Georgia. At the Atlanta Olympics the following year, Greville reached the final of the 200-metre freestyle, as well as collecting a bronze medal in the 4×200-metre freestyle relay, alongside Susie O'Neill, Nicole Stevenson and Emma Johnson.

Greville's emergence was complete when she claimed a bronze medal in the 200-metre freestyle at the 1998 FINA World Championships in Perth, as well as the relay event. However, aside from a relay gold medal in the 4×200-metre freestyle relay, she failed to medal at the 1998 Commonwealth Games in Kuala Lumpur, Malaysia.

In 1999, Greville sustained a shoulder injury from a car accident. Due to this injury, Greville withdrew from the 1999 Pan Pacific Games in order to surgically repair her shoulder. Five weeks from Olympic Trials Greville's shoulder failed. Greville swam trials with an injured shoulder missing selection for the 2000 Summer Olympics.

== See also ==
- List of Olympic medalists in swimming (women)
- List of World Aquatics Championships medalists in swimming (women)
