= Paula Harmokivi =

Finnish swimmer

Personal information
- Full name: Paula Marja Johanna Harmokivi
- Nickname: "Patse"
- Nationality: Finland
- Born: 20 May 1975 (age 51) Lahti, Finland
- Height: 1.76 m (5 ft 9 in)
- Weight: 69 kg (152 lb)

Sport
- Sport: Swimming
- Strokes: Freestyle
- Club: Lahden Uimaseura

Paula Harmokivi (born 20 May 1975 in Lahti) is a former freestyle swimmer from Finland, who competed for her native country at the 1996 Summer Olympics in Atlanta, Georgia. There she finished in 16th place with the 4x100 Freestyle Relay Team, and in 18th and 33rd place on her personal starts, the 200m Freestyle and the 400m Freestyle.
