= Nathalie Lee Baw =

Mauritian swimmer

Personal information
- Full name: Nathalie Lee Baw
- National team: Mauritius
- Born: 9 April 1985 (age 41)
- Height: 1.65 m (5 ft 5 in)
- Weight: 50 kg (110 lb)

Sport
- Sport: Swimming
- Strokes: Freestyle

Nathalie Lee Baw (born April 9, 1985) is a Mauritian former swimmer, who specialized in sprint freestyle events. Lee Baw competed for Mauritius, as a 15-year-old, in the women's 100 m freestyle at the 2000 Summer Olympics in Sydney. She received a ticket from FINA, under a Universality program, in an entry time of 1:03.15. She challenged seven other swimmers in heat one, including fellow 15-year-old Maria Awori of Kenya. Coming from fifth at the final turn, Lee Baw edged out Uganda's Supra Singhal on the final stretch to pick up a fourth seed in 1:06.67. Lee Baw failed to advance into the semifinals, as she placed fiftieth overall in the prelims.
