= Marja Pärssinen =

Finnish swimmer

Personal information
- Full name: Marja Kristiina Päivinen-Pärssinen
- Nickname: "Marde'
- Nationality: Finland
- Born: 13 March 1971 (age 55) Jyväskylä, Finland
- Height: 1.77 m (5 ft 10 in)
- Weight: 64 kg (141 lb)

Sport
- Sport: Swimming
- Strokes: Freestyle and Butterfly
- Club: Simmis
Medal record
Women's swimming
European Championships (SC)
Bronze medal – third place	1996 Rostock	50 m butterfly

Marja Pärssinen (born 13 March 1971 in Jyväskylä, Finland) is a retired female butterfly and freestyle swimmer from Finland. Nicknamed Marde Pärssinen competed for her native country at three consecutive Summer Olympics, starting in 1992 in Barcelona, Spain. Her best result was a 14th place with the women's 4×100 m medley relay team at the 1996 Summer Olympics, alongside Mia Hagman, Minna Salmela, and Anu Koivisto.
