= Mia Muusfeldt =

Danish swimmer

Personal information
- Born: 30 July 1979 (age 46) Greve, Denmark

Sport
- Sport: Swimming

Mia Muusfeldt (born 30 July 1979) is a Danish swimmer. She competed in the women's 200 metre freestyle event at the 1996 Summer Olympics.
