= Angela Postma =

Dutch swimmer (born 1971)

Medal record

Representing Netherlands

Women's swimming

World Championships (SC)
Silver medal – second place	1995 Rio de Janeiro	50 m freestyle

European Championships (LC)
Bronze medal – third place	1995 Vienna	50 m freestyle

European Championships (SC)
Gold medal – first place	1994 Stavanger	50 m butterfly
Silver medal – second place	1994 Stavanger	50 m freestyle
Silver medal – second place	1998 Sheffield	4x50 m freestyle
Bronze medal – third place	1994 Stavanger	4x50 m freestyle

Angela Postma (born August 6, 1971) is a former freestyle swimmer from the Netherlands, who won the gold medal in the 50 m butterfly at the European Sprint Swimming Championships 1994 in Stavanger, Norway. At the same tournament the sprinter, coached by Henk Tempelman, also captured a silver medal (50 m freestyle) and a bronze medal (4×50 m freestyle relay). Postma competed at the 1996 Summer Olympics in Atlanta, Georgia, where she finished in tenth position in the 50 m freestyle.
