= Maria Awori =

Kenyan swimmer (born 1984)

Personal information
- Full name: Maria Awori
- National team: Kenya
- Born: 8 November 1984 (age 41)
- Height: 1.60 m (5 ft 3 in)
- Weight: 47 kg (104 lb)

Sport
- Sport: Swimming
- Strokes: Freestyle

Maria Awori (born November 8, 1984) is a Kenyan former swimmer, who specialized in sprint freestyle events. Awori competed for Kenya, as a 15-year-old teen, in the women's 100 m freestyle at the 2000 Summer Olympics in Sydney. She received a ticket from FINA, under a Universality program, in an entry time of 1:04.00. She challenged seven other swimmers in heat one, including fellow 15-year-old Nathalie Lee Baw of Mauritius. She raced to the third seed in a time of 1:06.23, more than two seconds below her entry standard. Awori failed to advance into the semifinals, as she placed forty-ninth overall in the prelims.
