= Ivana Walterová =

Slovak swimmer

Personal information
- Full name: Ivana Walterová-Lange
- National team: Slovakia
- Born: 1 April 1977 (age 49) Zlín, Czechoslovakia
- Height: 1.70 m (5 ft 7 in)
- Weight: 60 kg (132 lb)

Sport
- Sport: Swimming
- Strokes: Freestyle

Ivana Walterová-Lange (born April 1, 1977) is a Slovak former swimmer, who specialized in sprint freestyle events. She competed along with three-time Olympian and top favorite Martina Moravcová in the women's 50 m freestyle at the 2000 Summer Olympics in Sydney by achieving a FINA A-standard of 25.96 from the Slovakia Grand Prix in Banská Bystrica. She challenged seven other swimmers in heat seven, including Singapore's Olympic veteran Joscelin Yeo and Finland's fifteen-year-old Hanna-Maria Seppälä. Walterova faded down the stretch to a fifth seed in 26.23, nearly three tenths of a second outside her entry standard and also, off the leading time set by Estonia's Jana Kolukanova. Walterova failed to advance into the semifinals, as she finished thirtieth overall out of 74 swimmers in the morning prelims. Currently, Walterova lives in Germany with her husband and national swimming team coach Dirk Lange, and their only son, Alexander.
