= Dita Želvienė =

Lithuanian swimmer (born 1968)

Personal information
- Born: April 18, 1968 (age 58) Kaunas, Lithuanian SSR, Soviet Union

Sport
- Sport: Swimming

Dita Želvienė (also Babrauskaitė, Kareckienė) (born 18 April 1968) is a Lithuanian former swimmer and current coach.

== Career ==
Želvienė was born in Kaunas on 18 April 1968. She won the Ventės ragas-Nida swimming marathon in 1985 and 1986. She was a 45 time Lithuanian swimming champion and 51 time national record holder. Želvienė graduated from the Lithuanian State Institute of Physical Education in 1990. She represented Lithuania at the 1996 Summer Olympic Games in the 50 m freestyle, 100 m freestyle and 100 m butterfly.

She became a coach at Kaunas swimming school in 2001.
