= Chantal Gibney =

Irish swimmer (born 1980)

Personal information
- Full name: Chantal Zita Gibney
- National team: Ireland
- Born: 28 December 1980 (age 45) Dublin, Ireland
- Height: 1.78 m (5 ft 10 in)
- Weight: 70 kg (150 lb)

Sport
- Sport: Swimming
- Strokes: Freestyle
- Club: Blue Wave Swim Team (U.S.)
- College team: University of Florida (US)
- Coach: Gregg Troy (U.S.); Peter Banks (U.S.)

Chantal Zita Gibney (born 28 December 1980) is an Irish former competitive swimmer who specialised in sprint and middle-distance freestyle events. Gibney became a semi-finalist in the 200-metre freestyle at the European Championships, and later represented Ireland, as a 19-year-old, at the 2000 Summer Olympics. She also holds numerous Irish records, long or short course, in a middle-distance freestyle double (200 and 400 m), and fifteen All-American honours, while attending the University of Florida.

== Career ==
=== Early years ===
Gibney, a native of Dublin, Ireland, started her sporting career at the age of six with the Trojan Swim Club. In early 2000, she left her native country Ireland for the United States to train full-time for the Blue Wave Swim Team in Fort Lauderdale, Florida, coached by Peter Banks.

Gibney accepted an athletic scholarship to attend the University of Florida in Gainesville, Florida, where she competed for coach Gregg Troy as a member of the Florida Gators swimming and diving team from 2000 to 2004. While swimming for the Gators, she posted career bests in the 50-yard freestyle (22.58), 100-yard freestyle (49.83), 200-yard freestyle (1:46.32), and 500-yard freestyle (4:57.81) from the 2002 Southeastern Conference Championships, and received a total of fifteen All-American honours in her entire college career. Gibney also helped the Gators pull off a second-place effort in the 200-yard freestyle relay (1:30.18) at the SEC Championships, and fifth in the 400-yard medley relay (3:35.87) at the 2003 NCAA Women's Swimming and Diving Championships.

=== International career ===
Gibney competed in four individual events, as a member of an Irish squad, at the 2000 Summer Olympics in Sydney. After finishing tenth from the European Championships in Helsinki, Finland, her entry time of 2:02.83 (200 m freestyle) was officially accredited under a FINA A-standard. On the second day of the Games, Gibney placed thirty-fourth in the 400 m freestyle. Swimming in heat one, she enjoyed the race with an early lead in the first 150 metres, but faded down the stretch to a fourth seed in 4:23.73. The following day, in the 200 m freestyle, Gibney produced her best result with a twenty-eighth-place effort in 2:05.24. Two days later, in the 100-metre freestyle, Gibney placed forty-second on the morning prelims. Swimming in heat three, she fell short on the final lap to a seventh spot in 58.79, a 2.1-second deficit from leader Olga Mukomol of Ukraine. In her fourth event, 50-metre freestyle, Gibney posted a time of 27.46 from heat five, sufficiently enough for forty-eighth seed in the prelims.

At the 2001 FINA World Championships in Fukuoka, Japan, Gibney failed to reach the top 16 roster in any of her individual events, finishing forty-fourth in the 50-metre freestyle (27.13), thirty-sixth in the 100-metre freestyle (57.65), and thirty-third in the 200-metre freestyle (2:04.38).

== See also ==
- List of University of Florida alumni
- List of University of Florida Olympians
