= Minna Salmela =

Finnish swimmer

Personal information
- Full name: Minna Helena Salmela-Haipus
- Nationality: Finland
- Born: May 3, 1971 (age 55) Oulu
- Height: 1.77 m (5 ft 10 in)
- Weight: 61 kg (134 lb)

Sport
- Sport: Swimming
- Strokes: Freestyle
- Club: Oulun Uimaseura

Minna Salmela (born May 3, 1971, in Oulu) is a retired female freestyle sprint swimmer from Finland. Salmela competed for her native country at two consecutive Summer Olympics, starting in 1992 in Barcelona, Spain. Her best result was a 14th place with the women's 4 × 100 m medley relay team at the 1996 Summer Olympics, alongside Mia Hagman, Anu Koivisto, and Marja Pärssinen.
