= Nadezhda Chemezova =

Russian swimmer

Personal information
- Nationality: Russian
- Born: 28 August 1980 (age 45) Kamensk-Uralsky
- Height: 1.79 m (5 ft 10 in)
- Weight: 60 kg (132 lb)

Sport
- Sport: Swimming
- Strokes: Freestyle
Medal record
Women's swimming
Representing Russia
European Championships (SC)
Gold medal – first place	1999 Hong Kong	400 m freestyle

Nadezhda Chemezova (Russian: Надежда Чемезова; born 28 August 1980 in Kamensk-Uralsky) is a former freestyle swimmer from Russia. She represented her native country at two consecutive Summer Olympics, starting in 1996.
