= Louise Jöhncke =

Swedish swimmer

Personal information
- Full name: Louise Jöhncke
- Nationality: Sweden
- Born: 31 July 1976 (age 49) Stockholm, Sweden
- Height: 1.75 m (5 ft 9 in)

Sport
- Sport: Swimming
- Strokes: Freestyle and medley
- Club: Södertörns SS
Medal record
Women's swimming
Representing Sweden
Event	1st	2nd	3rd
Olympics	0	0	1
World Championships (SC)	2	2	2
European Championships (LC)	2	7	0
European Championships (SC)	0	0	2
Total	4	9	5
Olympic Games
Bronze medal – third place	2000 Sydney	4×100 m freestyle
World Championships (SC)
Gold medal – first place	1999 Hong Kong	4×200 m freestyle
Gold medal – first place	2000 Athens	4×100 m freestyle
Silver medal – second place	1993 Palma de Mallorca	4×100 m freestyle
Silver medal – second place	1997 Gothenburg	4×200 m freestyle
Bronze medal – third place	1995 Rio de Janeiro	4×100 m freestyle
Bronze medal – third place	1999 Hong Kong	4×100 m medley
European Championships (LC)
Gold medal – first place	2000 Helsinki	4×100 m freestyle
Gold medal – first place	2000 Helsinki	4×100 m medley
Silver medal – second place	1993 Sheffield	4×100 m freestyle
Silver medal – second place	1993 Sheffield	4×200 m freestyle
Silver medal – second place	1995 Vienna	4×100 m freestyle
Silver medal – second place	1997 Seville	4×100 m freestyle
Silver medal – second place	1997 Seville	4×200 m freestyle
Silver medal – second place	1999 Istanbul	4×100 m freestyle
Silver medal – second place	1999 Istanbul	4×200 m freestyle
European Championships (SC)
Bronze medal – third place	1998 Sheffield	100 m freestyle
Bronze medal – third place	1998 Sheffield	200 m freestyle

Louise Jöhncke (born 31 July 1976) is a former freestyle swimmer from Sweden, who competed for her native country at two consequentive Summer Olympics, starting in 1996. Her biggest successes came on short course (25 m); she won the world title as a member of the Swedish relay Team in the 4 × 200 m freestyle at the 1999 FINA World Swimming Championships (25 m) in Hong Kong, China. A year later, at 2000 FINA World Swimming Championships (25 m) in Athens, Greece, she captured the title in the 4 × 100 m freestyle.
