= Martina Moravcová =

Slovak swimmer (born 1976)

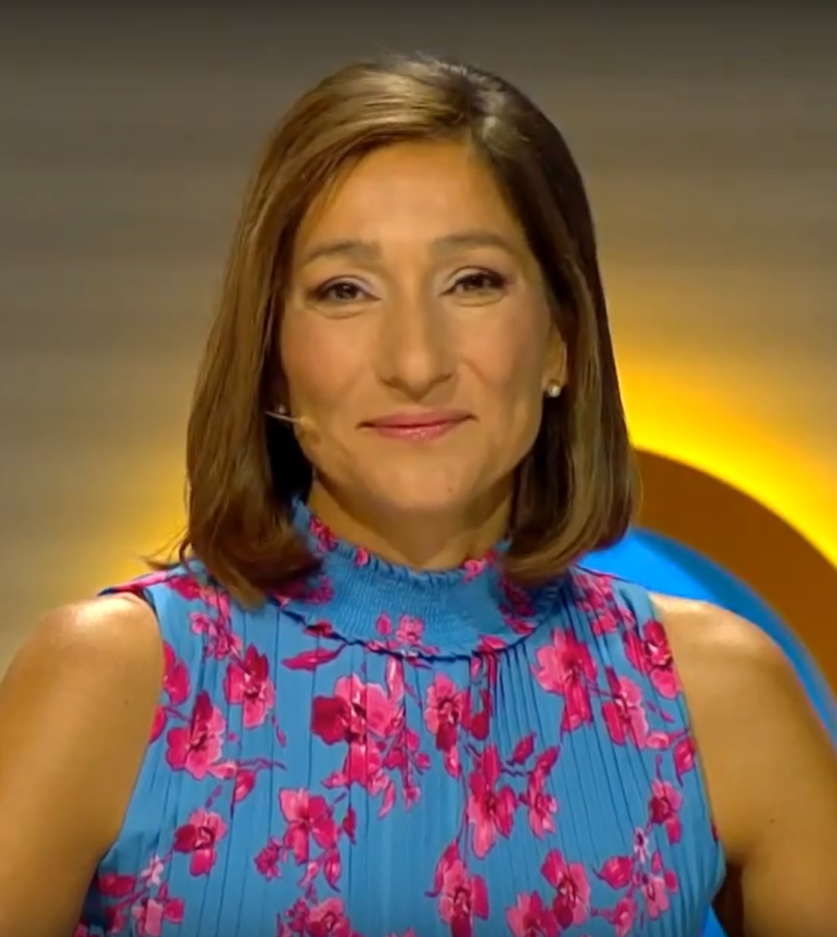
- Martina Moravcová (2022)

Personal information
- Nickname: The Slovak Fish
- Nationality: Slovakia
- Born: 16 January 1976 (age 50) Piešťany, Czechoslovakia
- Height: 1.72 m (5 ft 8 in)
- Weight: 60 kg (132 lb)
- Website: martinamoravcova.com

Sport
- Sport: Swimming
- Strokes: Freestyle; butterfly; medley
- Club: ŠKP Kúpele Piešťany (Slovakia); Dallas Mustangs (USA)
- College team: SMU Mustangs
Medal record
Women's swimming
Representing Slovakia
Event	1st	2nd	3rd
Olympic Games	0	2	0
World Championships (LC)	0	3	2
World Championships (SC)	7	5	5
European Championships (LC)	3	10	1
European Championships (SC)	19	7	4
Universiade	5	0	1
Total	34	27	13
Olympic Games
Silver medal – second place	2000 Sydney	100 m butterfly
Silver medal – second place	2000 Sydney	200 m freestyle
World Championships (LC)
Silver medal – second place	1998 Perth	100 m freestyle
Silver medal – second place	1998 Perth	200 m freestyle
Silver medal – second place	2003 Barcelona	200 m freestyle
Bronze medal – third place	1998 Perth	200 m medley
Bronze medal – third place	2003 Barcelona	100 m butterfly
World Championships (SC)
Gold medal – first place	1999 Hong Kong	200 m freestyle
Gold medal – first place	1999 Hong Kong	100 m medley
Gold medal – first place	1999 Hong Kong	200 m medley
Gold medal – first place	2000 Athens	100 m medley
Gold medal – first place	2002 Moscow	100 m butterfly
Gold medal – first place	2002 Moscow	100 m medley
Gold medal – first place	2004 Indianapolis	100 m butterfly
Silver medal – second place	1995 Rio de Janeiro	200 m medley
Silver medal – second place	1997 Gothenburg	200 m medley
Silver medal – second place	2000 Athens	200 m freestyle
Silver medal – second place	2000 Athens	200 m medley
Silver medal – second place	2002 Moscow	100 m freestyle
Bronze medal – third place	1995 Rio de Janeiro	200 m freestyle
Bronze medal – third place	1997 Gothenburg	200 m freestyle
Bronze medal – third place	2000 Athens	100 m freestyle
Bronze medal – third place	2004 Indianapolis	100 m medley
Bronze medal – third place	2006 Shanghai	100 m medley
European Championships (LC)
Gold medal – first place	2000 Helsinki	100 m butterfly
Gold medal – first place	2002 Berlin	100 m butterfly
Gold medal – first place	2004 Madrid	100 m butterfly
Silver medal – second place	1993 Sheffield	100 m freestyle
Silver medal – second place	1997 Sheffield	100 m freestyle
Silver medal – second place	1997 Seville	100 m butterfly
Silver medal – second place	1997 Seville	200 m medley
Silver medal – second place	2000 Helsinki	100 m freestyle
Silver medal – second place	2000 Helsinki	200 m freestyle
Silver medal – second place	2002 Berlin	50 m freestyle
Silver medal – second place	2002 Berlin	100 m freestyle
Silver medal – second place	2004 Madrid	50 m butterfly
Silver medal – second place	2006 Budapest	100 m butterfly
Bronze medal – third place	2000 Helsinki	50 m butterfly
European Championships (SC)
Gold medal – first place	1996 Rostock	200 m freestyle
Gold medal – first place	1998 Sheffield	200 m freestyle
Gold medal – first place	1998 Sheffield	100 m butterfly
Gold medal – first place	1998 Sheffield	100 m medley
Gold medal – first place	1999 Lisbon	200 m freestyle
Gold medal – first place	1999 Lisbon	100 m medley
Gold medal – first place	2000 Valencia	200 m freestyle
Gold medal – first place	2000 Valencia	100 m butterfly
Gold medal – first place	2000 Valencia	100 m medley
Gold medal – first place	2001 Antwerp	200 m freestyle
Gold medal – first place	2001 Antwerp	100 m butterfly
Gold medal – first place	2001 Antwerp	100 m medley
Gold medal – first place	2002 Riesa	100 m freestyle
Gold medal – first place	2002 Riesa	100 m butterfly
Gold medal – first place	2002 Riesa	100 m medley
Gold medal – first place	2003 Dublin	100 m butterfly
Gold medal – first place	2004 Vienna	100 m butterfly
Gold medal – first place	2004 Vienna	200 m butterfly
Gold medal – first place	2005 Trieste	100 m butterfly
Silver medal – second place	1994 Stavanger	50 m butterfly
Silver medal – second place	1996 Rostock	100 m medley
Silver medal – second place	1998 Sheffield	100 m freestyle
Silver medal – second place	1999 Lisbon	200 m medley
Silver medal – second place	2001 Antwerp	100 m freestyle
Silver medal – second place	2003 Dublin	50 m butterfly
Silver medal – second place	2004 Vienna	50 m butterfly
Bronze medal – third place	1994 Stavanger	50 m backstroke
Bronze medal – third place	1996 Rostock	100 m freestyle
Bronze medal – third place	2000 Valencia	100 m freestyle
Bronze medal – third place	2006 Helsinki	100 m butterfly
Universiade
Gold medal – first place	1995 Fukuoka	100 m freestyle
Gold medal – first place	1997 Catania	100 m freestyle
Gold medal – first place	1997 Catania	200 m freestyle
Gold medal – first place	1997 Catania	100 m butterfly
Gold medal – first place	1997 Catania	200 m medley
Bronze medal – third place	1995 Fukuoka	200 m medley

Martina Moravcová (born 16 January 1976) is a Slovak medley, butterfly, and freestyle swimmer. She made her international swimming debut in 1991 for Czechoslovakia, and went on to compete in five consecutive Summer Olympics (1992–2008). She is a two-time Olympic silver medalist, both achieved at the 2000 Summer Olympics in Sydney, Australia. In the 100 metre butterfly, she finished second to Inge de Bruijn, and in the 200 metre freestyle, she finished eight one-hundredths of a second to home favourite Susie O'Neill.

== Early life ==
Martina Moravcová was born in 1976 in Piešťany. As a child, she liked to go to the swimming pool and swim in the Váh river; when she became a young girl, she participated in yachting on Sĺňava Lake. In 1995 she moved to Dallas, Texas, where she started attending Southern Methodist University. She was diagnosed with Graves' disease in 1999.

== Career ==
=== Early career ===
Moravcová represented Czechoslovakia at the 1992 Summer Olympics in Barcelona, Spain. The youngest member of her country's delegation at 16 years old, she took part in the 100 metre butterfly and the 100 metre freestyle.

In 1999, she was named the NCAA's Women's Swimmer of the Year While at SMU, she won the Honda Sports Award as the nation's top female swimmer in 1999.

=== 2000 Summer Olympics ===
Moravcová represented Slovakia at the 2000 Summer Olympics in Sydney, Australia. She reached the final of the 100 metre butterfly, finishing second behind Inge de Bruijn who set a new world record in the race, to claim a silver medal. In the 200 metre freestyle, Moravcová became Slovakia's first multiple Olympic medal winner after finishing second in the final for another silver. She completed the race in 1 minute, 58.32 seconds, a national record and less than a tenth of a second behind gold medallist Susie O'Neill.

=== Later career ===
In 2000–01 FINA Swimming World Cup, Moravcová was the top women's winner in the FINA's World Cup series, winning eight events. She repeated the achievement in 2002 and 2004. She won her 100th World Cup gold medal in Moscow in 2005.

In 2008, Moravcová headed to the Summer Olympics for the fifth time as one of only two Slovak swimmers in her nation's delegation.

In 2014 she became a coach of a Slovak Swimming Camp at which she helped 700 children to achieve their goals.

She is a mother to two children.

Records
Preceded by Jenny Thompson	World Record holder Women's 100 Butterfly (25m); 26 January – 22 November 2002	Succeeded by Natalie Coughlin
Preceded by Xiaowen Hu; Jenny Thompson	World Record holder Women's 100 Individual Medley (25m); 12 December 1998 – 16 January 1999; 2 April 1999	Succeeded by Jenny Thompson; Jenny Thompson
Sporting positions
Preceded by -- Alison Sheppard	World Cup; Female Overall Winner; 2001/2002; 2003/2004	Succeeded by Alison Sheppard; Anna-Karin Kammerling
Preceded by Denys Sylantyev	Mare Nostrum; Overall Winner; 2003	Succeeded by Camelia Potec
