= Wilma van Hofwegen =

Dutch swimmer (born 1971)

Medal record

Women's swimming

Representing the Netherlands

Olympic Games
Silver medal – second place	2000 Sydney	4×100 m freestyle

World Championships (SC)
Silver medal – second place	1999 Hong Kong	4×100 m freestyle

European LC Championships
Silver medal – second place	2000 Helsinki	50 m freestyle
Bronze medal – third place	2002 Berlin	4×100 m freestyle

Willemina ("Wilma") Cornelia Adriana van Rijn-van Hofwegen (born 17 July 1971) is a former freestyle swimmer from the Netherlands, who was a member of the Dutch Women's 4×100 m freestyle relay Team that won the silver medal at the 2000 Summer Olympics in Sydney, Australia.

Van Hofwegen was born in Vlaardingen. She won the 1997 Dutch Championships in the 50 meter and 100 meter butterfly. She is married to former swimmer Michael van Rijn, who also competed for Holland. She competed in the Olympic silver medal-winning relay team alongside Inge de Bruijn, Thamar Henneken and Manon van Rooijen. She also competed at the 1996 Summer Olympics in Atlanta, United States.
