= Sue Rolph =

British swimmer (born 1978)

Personal information
- Full name: Susan Rolph
- Nickname: "Sue"
- Nationality: British
- Born: 15 May 1978 (age 48) Newcastle, Tyne and Wear
- Height: 1.68 m (5 ft 6 in)
- Weight: 62 kg (137 lb)

Sport
- Sport: Swimming
- Strokes: Freestyle and medley
- Club: City of Newcastle
Medal record
Women's swimming
Representing Great Britain
Event	1st	2nd	3rd
World Championships (SC)	1	0	2
European Championships (LC)	1	0	4
European Championships (SC)	3	6	10
Commonwealth Games	3	1	2
Total	8	7	18
World Championships (SC)
Gold medal – first place	1999 Hong Kong	4×100 m freestyle
Bronze medal – third place	1997 Gothenburg	200 m medley
Bronze medal – third place	1999 Hong Kong	100 m freestyle
European Championships (LC)
Gold medal – first place	1999 Istanbul	100 m freestyle
Bronze medal – third place	1995 Vienna	4×100 m freestyle
Bronze medal – third place	1999 Istanbul	4×100 m freestyle
Bronze medal – third place	1999 Istanbul	4×100 m medley
Bronze medal – third place	2000 Helsinki	200 m medley
European Championships (SC)
Gold medal – first place	1996 Rostock	100 m medley
Gold medal – first place	1996 Rostock	200 m medley
Gold medal – first place	1998 Sheffield	100 m freestyle
Silver medal – second place	1994 Stavanger	100 m medley
Silver medal – second place	1996 Rostock	50 m freestyle
Silver medal – second place	1996 Rostock	100 m freestyle
Silver medal – second place	1999 Lisbon	50 m freestyle
Silver medal – second place	1999 Lisbon	100 m freestyle
Silver medal – second place	2000 Valencia	4×50 m freestyle
Bronze medal – third place	1994 Stavanger	50 m freestyle
Bronze medal – third place	1998 Sheffield	50 m freestyle
Bronze medal – third place	1998 Sheffield	100 m medley
Bronze medal – third place	1998 Sheffield	200 m medley
Bronze medal – third place	1998 Sheffield	4×50 m freestyle
Bronze medal – third place	1999 Lisbon	200 m medley
Bronze medal – third place	1999 Lisbon	4×50 m freestyle
Bronze medal – third place	1999 Lisbon	4×50 m medley
Bronze medal – third place	2000 Valencia	100 m medley
Bronze medal – third place	2000 Valencia	200 m medley
Representing England
Commonwealth Games
Gold medal – first place	1994 Victoria	4x100m freestyle relay
Gold medal – first place	1998 Kuala Lumpur	50 m freestyle
Gold medal – first place	1998 Kuala Lumpur	100 m freestyle
Silver medal – second place	1998 Kuala Lumpur	4x100 m freestyle relay
Bronze medal – third place	1998 Kuala Lumpur	200m medley
Bronze medal – third place	1998 Kuala Lumpur	4x100 m medley relay

Susan Rolph (born 15 May 1978) is a female former freestyle and medley swimmer from Great Britain. The 100 metre freestyle European champion in 1999, and Commonwealth Games champion in 50 and 100 metre freestyle in 1998, Rolph was particular adept at short course racing, accumulating 22 senior medals in the discipline, including a world championship gold medal in the 4 x 100 freestyle relay in 1999, and a hat-trick of European short course individual titles between 1996 and 1998.

== Early life ==
She grew up in Newburn, attending Walbottle High School.

== Swimming career ==
Rolph was one of the dominating forces in the 1990s of British women's swimming. Her Commonwealth Games medal haul consists of three gold, one silver and two bronze medals. She represented England in four events, winning a gold medal in the 4 x 100 metres freestyle relay, at the 1994 Commonwealth Games in Victoria, Canada. Four years later she represented England in five events and gained a medal in all five including two gold medals, at the 1998 Commonwealth Games in Kuala Lumpur, Malaysia.

She is a four times winner of the British Championship in the 50 metres freestyle (1994, 1995, 1997, 1998), four times winner of the 100 metres freestyle (1994, 1995, 1998, 1999) and the 200 metres freestyle champion in 2000. She also won the 50 metres butterfly title in 1994 and was six times champion in the 200 metres medley (1994, 1995, 1997, 1998, 1999 and 2000).

== See also ==
- List of Commonwealth Games medallists in swimming (women)
- List of European Short Course Swimming Championships medalists (women)
