= 1998 European Short Course Swimming Championships – Women's 400 metre freestyle =

The finals and the qualifying heats of the Women's 400 metres Freestyle event at the 1998 European Short Course Swimming Championships were held on the second day of the competition, on Saturday 12 December 1998 in Sheffield, England.

== Finals ==
RANK	FINAL	TIME
Gold medal	Carla Geurts (NED)	4:08.85
Silver medal	Victoria Horner (GBR)	4:09.02
Bronze medal	Karen Legg (GBR)	4:09.66
4.	Hana Černá (CZE)	4:10.14
5.	Josefin Lillhage (SWE)	4:11.21
6.	Simona Ricciardi (ITA)	4:11.31
7.	Kirsten Vlieghuis (NED)	4:11.69
8.	Lotta Wänberg (SWE)	4:13.39

== Qualifying Heats ==
RANK	HEATS RANKING	TIME
1.	Carla Geurts (NED)	4:12.01
2.	Hana Černá (CZE)	4:12.12
3.	Lotta Wänberg (SWE)	4:12.78
3.	Karen Legg (GBR)	4:12.78
5.	Josefin Lillhage (SWE)	4:12.97
6.	Kirsten Vlieghuis (NED)	4:13.20
6.	Victoria Horner (GBR)	4:13.20
8.	Nicole Zahnd (SUI)	4:13.27
8.	Simona Ricciardi (ITA)	4:13.27
10.	Peggy Büchse (GER)	4:13.33
11.	Sofie Goffin (BEL)	4:14.17
12.	Nadezhda Chemezova (RUS)	4:14.45
13.	Angels Bardina (ESP)	4:15.26
14.	Camelia Potec (ROM)	4:15.81
15.	Tanja Blatnik (SLO)	4:16.51
16.	Flavia Rigamonti (SUI)	4:16.60
17.	Hannah Stockbauer (GER)	4:17.00
18.	Mirjana Boševska (MKD)	4:17.04
19.	Flora Lamotte (FRA)	4:17.51
20.	Urska Ros (SLO)	4:17.78
21.	Mariana Lymperta (GRE)	4:18.61
22.	Adi Bichman (ISR)	4:19.84
23.	Ditte Jensen (DEN)	4:21.16
24.	Petra Banović (CRO)	4:22.25
25.	Britt Raaby (DEN)	4:24.06
26.	Kristýna Kyněrová (CZE)	4:27.38
27.	Eirini Kosta (GRE)	4:32.63
