= Swimming at the 1997 European Aquatics Championships – Women's 400 metre freestyle =

The final of the Women's 400 metres Freestyle event at the European LC Championships 1997 was held on Thursday 21 August 1997 in Seville, Spain.

== Finals ==
RANK	FINAL A	TIME
	Dagmar Hase (GER)	4:09.58
	Michelle Smith (IRL)	4:10.50
	Kerstin Kielgass (GER)	4:10.89
4.	Carla Geurts (NED)	4:11.23
5.	Kirsten Vlieghuis (NED)	4:13.51
6.	Nadezhda Chemezova (RUS)	4:13.81
7.	Simona Păduraru (ROM)	4:13.87
8.	Olena Lapunova (UKR)	4:14.89

RANK	FINAL B	TIME
9.	Camelia Potec (ROM)	4:13.79
10.	Laetitia Choux (FRA)	4:15.77
11.	Ingrid Bourre (FRA)	4:15.92
12.	Anna Simoni (ITA)	4:16.13
13.	Hana Černá (CZE)	4:16.26
14.	Sarai Justes (ESP)	4:17.53
15.	Jessica Craig (GBR)	4:18.33
16.	Britt Raaby (DEN)	4:18.44

== Qualifying heats ==
RANK	HEATS RANKING	TIME
1.	Olena Lapunova (UKR)	4:12.63
2.	Nadezhda Chemezova (RUS)	4:13.91
3.	Kirsten Vlieghuis (NED)	4:14.14
4.	Carla Geurts (NED)	4:14.20
5.	Dagmar Hase (GER)	4:14.37
6.	Kerstin Kielgass (GER)	4:14.47
7.	Simona Păduraru (ROM)	4:16.12
8.	Michelle Smith (IRL)	4:16.43
9.	Laetitia Choux (FRA)	4:16.78
10.	Jessica Craig (GBR)	4:17.83
11.	Camelia Potec (ROM)	4:18.23
12.	Britt Raaby (DEN)	4:18.38
13.	Anna Simoni (ITA)	4:18.75
14.	Ingrid Bourre (FRA)	4:18.78
15.	Hana Černá (CZE)	4:18.84
16.	Sarai Justes (ESP)	4:19.10
17.	Asa Sandlund (SWE)	4:21.51
18.	Victoria Horner (GBR)	4:22.00
19.	Kristýna Kyněrová (CZE)	4:23.69
20.	Flavia Rigamonti (SUI)	4:23.72
21.	Eva Zachariassen (DEN)	4:23.96
22.	Sofie Goffin (BEL)	4:25.42
23.	Laura Roca (ESP)	4:25.64
24.	Petra Banović (CRO)	4:26.64
25.	Urska Ros (SLO)	4:29.67
26.	Chantal Strasser (SUI)	4:30.98

== See also ==
- 1996 Women's Olympic Games 400m Freestyle
- 1997 Women's World Championships (SC) 400m Freestyle
