= Swimming at the 2000 Summer Olympics – Women's 4 × 200 metre freestyle relay =

Women's 4 × 200 metre freestyle relay at the Games of the XXVII Olympiad
- Venue: Sydney International Aquatic Centre
- Dates: September 20, 2000 (heats & final)
- Competitors: 69 from 15 nations
- Teams: 15
- Winning time: 7:57.80 OR

Medalists
1st place, gold medalist(s)		Samantha Arsenault, Diana Munz, Lindsay Benko, Jenny Thompson, Julia Stowers*, Kim Black*	United States
2nd place, silver medalist(s)		Susie O'Neill, Giaan Rooney, Kirsten Thomson, Petria Thomas, Jacinta van Lint*, Elka Graham*	Australia
3rd place, bronze medalist(s)		Franziska van Almsick, Antje Buschschulte, Sara Harstick, Kerstin Kielgass, Britta Steffen*, Meike Freitag*; *Indicates the swimmer only competed in the preliminary heats.	Germany

The women's 4 × 200 metre freestyle relay event and place at the 2000 Summer Olympics took place on 20 September at the Sydney International Aquatic Centre in Sydney, Australia.

The U.S. women's team established a new Olympic record to defend their title with the help of a sterling anchor leg from Jenny Thompson. Throughout most of the race, the Americans were trailing slightly behind the host nation Australia until Thompson dived into the pool at the final exchange. Thompson held off a sprint battle from Petria Thomas on the final stretch until she touched the wall by seven-tenths of a second (0.70) with a remarkable split of 1:59.35 to deliver the foursome of Samantha Arsenault (1:59.92), Diana Munz (1:59.19), and Lindsay Benko (1:59.34) a gold-medal time in 7:57.80. As the Americans celebrated their triumph in the pool, Thompson picked up her ninth career medal to break a tie with former East Germany's Kristin Otto for the most golds, a total of seven, and to maintain her position as the most successful woman in Olympic history.

After leading three-fourths of the race, Australia's Thomas (2:00.32), Susie O'Neill (1:58.70), Giaan Rooney (1:59.37), and Kirsten Thomson (2:00.13) powered home with a silver in 7:58.52. Meanwhile, Germany's Franziska van Almsick (1:59.51), Antje Buschschulte (2:00.35), and Sara Harstick (2:00.88) helped their teammate Kerstin Kielgass produce a striking anchor of 1:57.90 to capture the bronze medal in 7:58.64. For the first time in Olympic history, all three teams finished the race under an eight-minute barrier.

Outside the club, Romania's Camelia Potec (1:59.10), Simona Păduraru (2:01.52), Ioana Diaconescu (2:01.47), and Beatrice Câșlaru (1:59.54) missed the podium with a fourth-place time of 8:01.63, worthy enough for a national record. Canada (8:02.65), Great Britain (8:03.69), Italy (8:04.68), and France (8:05.99) rounded out the championship finale.

== Records ==
Prior to this competition, the existing world and Olympic records were as follows.

World record	East Germany (GDR); Manuela Stellmach (2:00.23); Astrid Strauss (1:58.90); Anke Möhring (1:58.73); Heike Friedrich (1:57.61)	7:55.47	Strasbourg, France	18 August 1987
Olympic record	United States; Trina Jackson (1:59.71); Cristina Teuscher (1:58.86); Sheila Taormina (2:01.29); Jenny Thompson (2:00.01)	7:59.87	Atlanta, United States	25 July 1996

The following new world and Olympic records were set during this competition.

Date	Event	Name	Nationality	Time	Record
September 20	Final	Samantha Arsenault (1:59.92); Diana Munz (1:59.19); Lindsay Benko (1:59.34); Jenny Thompson (1:59.35)	United States	7:57.80	OR

== Results ==
=== Heats ===
Rank	Heat	Lane	Nation	Swimmers	Time	Notes
1	2	4	United States	Samantha Arsenault (1:59.38); Julia Stowers (2:01.51); Kim Black (2:01.41); Diana Munz (1:59.39)	8:01.69	Q
2	1	4	Australia	Elka Graham (2:01.91); Kirsten Thomson (2:00.31); Jacinta van Lint (2:01.97); Giaan Rooney (1:59.07)	8:03.26	Q
3	2	3	Romania	Camelia Potec (2:00.27); Florina Herea (2:01.86); Lorena Diaconescu (2:01.13); Simona Păduraru (2:01.98)	8:05.24	Q
4	2	6	Italy	Cecilia Vianini (2:00.91); Luisa Striani (2:02.02); Sara Parise (2:00.05); Sara Goffi (2:03.20)	8:06.18	Q
5	2	5	Germany	Britta Steffen (2:02.01); Sara Harstick (2:00.68); Meike Freitag (2:02.86); Antje Buschschulte (2:00.97)	8:06.52	Q
6	1	6	France	Solenne Figuès (2:01.92); Laetitia Choux (2:01.49); Katarin Quelennec (2:02.24); Alicia Bozon (2:01.38)	8:07.03	Q
7	1	3	Canada	Jessica Deglau (2:01.92); Shannon Shakespeare (2:01.36); Katie Brambley (2:02.40); Jen Button (2:01.44)	8:07.12	Q
8	1	5	Great Britain	Claire Huddart (2:03.12); Karen Legg (2:01.28); Nicola Jackson (2:00.93); Janine Belton (2:02.08)	8:07.41	Q
9	2	7	China	Wang Luna (2:03.45); Chen Yan (2:02.10); Sun Dan (2:02.16); Yang Yu (1:59.98)	8:07.69	
10	2	1	Russia	Yuliya Fomenko (2:02.84); Irina Ufimtseva (2:00.96); Lyubov Yudina (2:03.16); Nadezhda Chemezova (2:01.07)	8:08.03	NR
11	1	7	Netherlands	Carla Geurts (2:00.56); Chantal Groot (2:04.42); Haike van Stralen (2:02.22); Manon van Rooijen (2:01.33)	8:08.53	NR
12	2	2	Belgium	Nina van Koeckhoven (2:01.49); Yseult Gervy (2:04.22); Fabienne Dufour (2:05.46); Sofie Goffin (2:01.20)	8:12.37	
13	1	2	Spain	Laura Roca (2:02.25); Angels Bardina (2:04.47); Natalia Cabrerizo (2:04.94); Paula Carballido (2:02.16)	8:13.82	
14	2	8	Kyrgyzstan	Anna Korshikova (2:06.99); Anjelika Solovieva (2:15.59); Yekaterina Tochenaya (2:10.56); Nataliya Korabelnikova (2:08.07)	8:41.21	NR
	1	1	Ukraine	Nadiya Beshevli; Zhanna Lozumyrska; Albina Bordunova; Olena Lapunova	DSQ	

=== Final ===
Rank	Lane	Nation	Swimmers	Time	Time behind	Notes
1st place, gold medalist(s)	4	United States	Samantha Arsenault (1:59.92); Diana Munz (1:59.19); Lindsay Benko (1:59.34); Jenny Thompson (1:59.35)	7:57.80		OR
2nd place, silver medalist(s)	5	Australia	Susie O'Neill (1:58.70); Giaan Rooney (1:59.37); Kirsten Thomson (2:00.13); Petria Thomas (2:00.32)	7:58.52	0.72	OC
3rd place, bronze medalist(s)	2	Germany	Franziska van Almsick (1:59.51); Antje Buschschulte (2:00.35); Sara Harstick (2:00.88); Kerstin Kielgass (1:57.90)	7:58.64	0.84	NR
4	3	Romania	Camelia Potec (1:59.10); Simona Păduraru (2:01.52); Lorena Diaconescu (2:01.47); Beatrice Câșlaru (1:59.54)	8:01.63	3.83	NR
5	1	Canada	Marianne Limpert (1:59.85); Shannon Shakespeare (2:01.78); Joanne Malar (2:00.50); Jessica Deglau (2:00.52)	8:02.65	4.85	
6	8	Great Britain	Nicola Jackson (2:00.56); Karen Legg (2:01.55); Janine Belton (2:00.79); Karen Pickering (2:00.79)	8:03.69	5.89	
7	6	Italy	Sara Parise (2:00.55); Cecilia Vianini (1:59.46); Luisa Striani (2:01.47); Sara Goffi (2:03.20)	8:04.68	6.88	
8	7	France	Solenne Figuès (1:59.67); Laetitia Choux (2:01.86); Katarin Quelennec (2:03.19); Alicia Bozon (2:01.27)	8:05.99	8.19	
