= 1998 European Short Course Swimming Championships – Women's 800 metre freestyle =

The qualifying heats of the Women's 800 metres Freestyle event at the 1998 European Short Course Swimming Championships were held on the first day of the competition, on Friday 11 December 1998 in Sheffield, England. The heats resulted in declared winners.

== Finals ==
RANK	FINAL RANKING	TIME
Gold medal	Flavia Rigamonti (SUI)	8:27.85
Silver medal	Carla Geurts (NED)	8:29.20
Bronze medal	Sarah Collings (GBR)	8:33.70
4.	Hannah Stockbauer (GER)	8:34.73
5.	Tatyana Mykhalylova (RUS)	8:37.96
6.	Jana Pechanová (CZE)	8:39.48
7.	Angels Bardina (ESP)	8:39.97
—	Kirsten Vlieghuis (NED)	DNF
9.	Simona Ricciardi (ITA)	8:41.49
10.	Peggy Büchse (GER)	8:43.73
11.	Sofie Goffin (BEL)	8:44.84
12.	Zhanna Lozumyrska (UKR)	8:45.53
13.	Mariana Lymperta (GRE)	8:48.17
14.	Adi Bichman (ISR)	8:48.51
15.	Urska Ros (SLO)	8:48.99
16.	Dagmar Majerová (CZE)	8:55.22
17.	Petra Banović (CRO)	8:55.53
18.	Flora Lamotte (FRA)	8:58.23
