= Swimming at the 2001 World Aquatics Championships – Women's 400 metre freestyle =

Women's 400-metre freestyle at the 2001 FINA World Championships
- Dates: 29 July 2001
- Competitors: 41
- Winning time: 4 minutes 7.30 seconds

Medalists
gold medal	Yana Klochkova	Ukraine
silver medal	Claudia Poll	Costa Rica
bronze medal	Hannah Stockbauer	Germany

The women's 400-metre freestyle event at the 2001 World Aquatic Championships took place 29 July. Both the heats and final were held on 29 July.

== Records ==
Prior to the competition, the existing world and championship records were as follows:

World record	Janet Evans (USA)	4:03.85	Seoul, South Korea	22 September 1988
Championship record	Tracey Wickham (AUS)	4:06.28	West Berlin, Federal Republic of Germany	24 August 1978

== Results ==
=== Heats ===
Rank	Swimmer	Nation	Time	Notes
1	Hannah Stockbauer	Germany	4:11.30	Q
2	Yana Klochkova	Ukraine	4:11.83	Q
3	Irina Oufimtseva	Russia	4:11.92	Q
4	Claudia Poll	Costa Rica	4:12.17	Q
5	Chen Hua	China	4:12.19	Q
6	Carla Geurts	Netherlands	4:12.49	Q
7	Alicia Bozon	France	4:12.66	Q
8	Camelia Potec	Romania	4:12.79	Q
9	Kaitlin Sandeno	United States	4:12.82	
10	Simona Păduraru	Romania	4:13.15	
11	Giaan Rooney	Australia	4:13.58	
12	Sofie Goffin	Belgium	4:14.80	
13	Ashley Chandler	United States	4:14.83	
14	Sachiko Yamada	Japan	4:15.14	
15	Nadezhda Chemezova	Russia	4:15.24	
16	Éva Risztov	Hungary	4:15.25	
17	Jessica Deglau	Canada	4:15.93	
18	Yang Yu	China	4:16.17	
19	Lidia Elizalde	Spain	4:16.47	
20	Laura Roca	Spain	4:17.16	
21	Elizabeth Van Welie	New Zealand	4:17.97	
22	Monique Ferreira	Brazil	4:18.00	
23	Sarah-Jane D'Arcy	Australia	4:18.04	
24	Hana Netrefová	Czech Republic	4:18.76	
25	Patricia Villareal	Mexico	4:19.00	
26	Sophie Simard	Canada	4:19.87	
27	Helen Nolfolk	New Zealand	4:20.20	
28	Jana Pechanová	Czech Republic	4:20.43	
29	Zoi Dimoschaki	Greece	4:20.80	
30	Marianna Lymperta	Greece	4:20.90	
31	Ivanka Moralieva	Bulgaria	4:21.79	
32	Eri Yamanoi	Japan	4:22.53	
33	Chantal Strasser	Switzerland	4:22.87	
34	Cecilia Biagioli	Argentina	4:25.47	
35	Fabiana Susini	Italy	4:25.95	
36	Lin Chi-Chan	Chinese Taipei	4:26.26	
37	U-Nice Chan	Singapore	4:35.44	
38	Christel Bouvron	Singapore	4:37.38	
39	Xenavee Pangelinan	Northern Mariana Islands	4:45.21	
40	Lee Huei-Yun	Chinese Taipei	4:47.13	
41	Shun Kwan Andrea Chum	Macau	4:47.20	
–	Flavia Rigamonti	Switzerland	DNS	

=== Final ===
Rank	Name	Nationality	Time	Notes
1st place, gold medalist(s)	Yana Klochkova	Ukraine	4:07.30	
2nd place, silver medalist(s)	Claudia Poll	Costa Rica	4:09.15	
3rd place, bronze medalist(s)	Hannah Stockbauer	Germany	4:09.36	
4	Irina Oufimtseva	Russia	4:10.17	
5	Chen Hua	China	4:10.37	
6	Camelia Potec	Romania	4:11.67	
7	Carla Geurts	Netherlands	4:13.04	
8	Alicia Bozon	France	4:15.21	

Key: WR = World record
