= Swimming at the 2001 World Aquatics Championships – Women's 200 metre freestyle =

Women's 200-metre freestyle at the 2001 FINA World Championships
- Dates: 26 July 2021 (heats, semifinals); 27 July 2001 (final)
- Competitors: 43
- Winning time: 1 minute 58.57 seconds

Medalists
gold medal	Giaan Rooney	Australia
silver medal	Yang Yu	China
bronze medal	Camelia Potec	Romania

The women's 200-metre freestyle event at the 2001 World Aquatic Championships took place 27 July. The heats and semifinals were on 26 July.

== Records ==
Prior to this competition, the existing world and competition records were as follows:

World record	Franziska van Almsick (GER)	1:56.78	Rome, Italy	6 September 1994
Championship record	Franziska van Almsick (GER)	1:56.78	Rome, Italy	6 September 1994

== Results ==
=== Heats ===
Rank	Swimmer	Nation	Time	Notes
1	Claudia Poll	Costa Rica	1:59.73	Q
2	Nadezhda Chemezova	Russia	2:00.07	Q
3	Mette Jacobsen	Denmark	2:00.31	Q
4	Giaan Rooney	Australia	2:00.31	Q
5	Martina Moravcová	Slovakia	2:00.32	Q
6	Elka Graham	Australia	2:00.53	Q
7	Yang Yu	China	2:00.78	Q
8	Camelia Potec	Romania	2:00.82	Q
9	Maki Mita	Japan	2:00.93	Q
10	Sofie Goffin	Belgium	2:01.03	Q
10	Nicola Jackson	United Kingdom	2:01.03	Q
12	Karen Pickering	United Kingdom	2:01.35	Q
13	Carla Geurts	Netherlands	2:01.64	Q
14	Alicia Bozon	France	2:01.67	Q
14	Jessica Deglau	Canada	2:01.67	Q
16	Natallia Baranouskaya	Belarus	2:01.83	Q
17	Cecilia Vianini	Italy	2:02.15	
18	Laura Roca	Spain	2:02.23	
19	Xu Yanwei	China	2:02.27	
20	Josefin Lillhage	Sweden	2:02.31	
21	Florencia Szigeti	Argentina	2:02.39	
22	Nicole Zahnd	Switzerland	2:02.60	
23	Sarah Harstick	Germany	2:02.62	
24	Luisa Striani	Italy	2:02.65	
25	Zoi Dimoschaki	Greece	2:02.66	
26	Monique Ferreira	Brazil	2:03.13	
27	Alessa Ries	Germany	2:03.21	
28	Stefanie Williams	United States	2:03.33	
29	Olga Bogoslovenko	Russia	2:03.46	
30	Colleen Lanne	United States	2:03.52	
31	Sophie Simard	Canada	2:03.75	
32	Nina van Koeckhoven	Belgium	2:03.95	
33	Chantal Gibney	Ireland	2:04.38	
34	Eri Yamanoi	Japan	2:04.48	
35	Ania Gustomelski	Israel	2:04.59	
36	Lin Chi-Chan	Chinese Taipei	2:05.50	
37	Helen Nolfolk	New Zealand	2:06.12	
38	Ivanka Moralieva	Bulgaria	2:06.92	
39	Christel Bouvron	Singapore	2:07.77	
40	U-Nice Chan	Singapore	2:08.99	
41	Maria Wong	Peru	2:09.30	
42	Nicole Hayes	Palau	2:11.01	
43	Lee Huei-Yun	Chinese Taipei	2:14.40	
–	Elina Partõka	Estonia	DNS	

=== Semifinals ===
Rank	Swimmer	Nation	Time	Notes
1	Claudia Poll	Costa Rica	1:59.45	Q
2	Giaan Rooney	Australia	1:59.62	Q
3	Yang Yu	China	1:59.68	Q
3	Nicola Jackson	United Kingdom	1:59.68	Q
5	Camelia Potec	Romania	1:59.73	Q
6	Elka Graham	Australia	1:59.75	Q
7	Martina Moravcová	Slovakia	1:59.76	Q
8	Maki Mita	Japan	2:00.05	QSO
8	Mette Jacobsen	Denmark	2:00.05	QSO
10	Nadezhda Chemezova	Russia	2:00.37	
10	Natallia Baranouskaya	Belarus	2:00.37	
12	Karen Pickering	United Kingdom	2:00.52	
13	Alicia Bozon	France	2:00.95	
14	Carla Geurts	Netherlands	2:01.71	
15	Sofie Goffin	Belgium	2:01.80	
16	Jessica Deglau	Canada	2:02.16	

==== Swim-off ====
Rank	Swimmer	Nation	Time	Notes
1	Mette Jacobsen	Denmark	2:00.31	Q
2	Maki Mita	Japan	2:01.01	

=== Final ===
Rank	Name	Nationality	Time	Notes
1st place, gold medalist(s)	Giaan Rooney	Australia	1:58.57	
2nd place, silver medalist(s)	Yang Yu	China	1:58.78	
3rd place, bronze medalist(s)	Camelia Potec	Romania	1:58.85	
4	Claudia Poll	Costa Rica	1:58.92	
5	Martina Moravcová	Slovakia	1:59.29	
6	Nicola Jackson	United Kingdom	1:59.44	
7	Elka Graham	Australia	1:59.63	
8	Mette Jacobsen	Denmark	1:59.64	

Key: WR = World record
