= Swimming at the 2000 Summer Olympics =

Swimming at the Games of the XXVII Olympiad
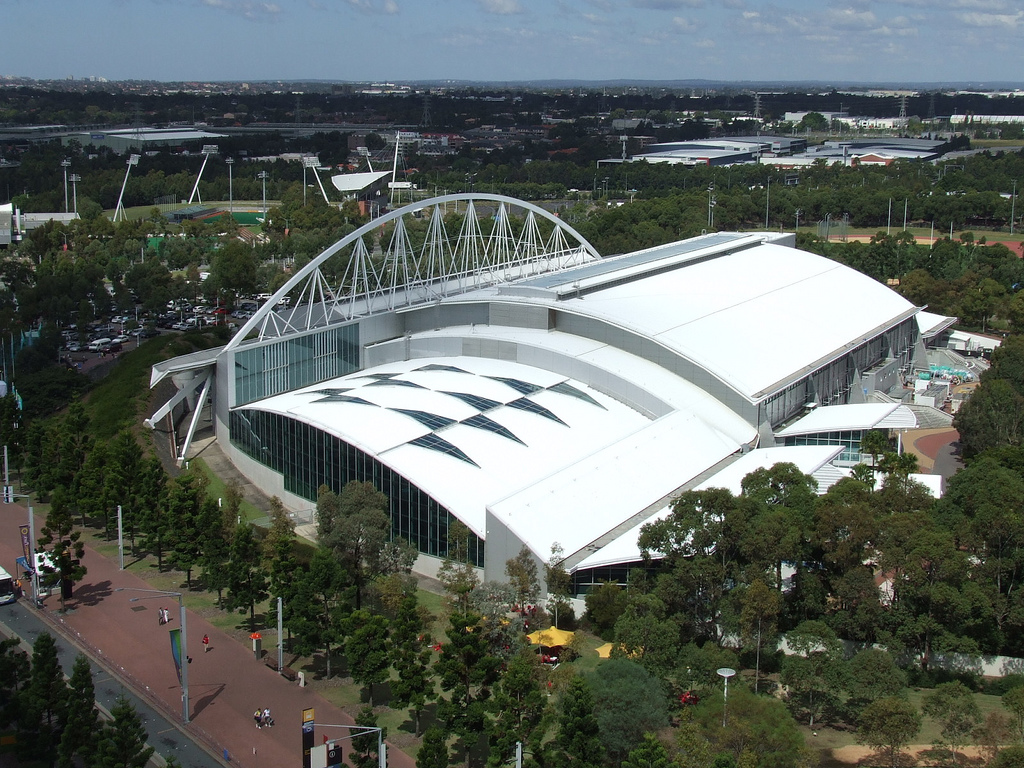
- Sydney International Aquatics Centre
- Venue: Sydney International Aquatic Centre
- Dates: 16–23 September 2000
- Competitors: 954 from 150 nations

The swimming competitions at the 2000 Summer Olympics in Sydney took place from 16 to 23 September 2000 at the Sydney International Aquatic Centre in Homebush Bay. It featured 32 events (16 male, 16 female), and a total of 954 swimmers from 150 nations.

The swimming program for 2000 was expanded from 1996, with the inclusion of the semifinal phase in each of the events except for some special cases. Long-distance swimming events (400 m freestyle, 800 m freestyle, 1500 m freestyle, and 400 m individual medley) and all relays still maintained the old format with only two phases: heats and final. Because of the radical changes in the competition format, it was extended into an eight-day program and thereby continued into the present era.

Swimmers from the United States were the most successful, winning 14 golds, 8 silver, and 11 bronze to lead the overall medal count with 33. Meanwhile, hosts Australia had produced a total of 18 medals (five golds, nine silver, and four bronze) to claim the second spot in the tally. A total of fourteen world records and thirty-eight Olympic records were set during the competition.

== Events ==
The following events were contested (all pool events were long course, and distances are in metres unless stated):

- Freestyle: 50, 100, 200, 400, 800 (women) and 1500 (men);
- Backstroke: 100 and 200;
- Breaststroke: 100 and 200;
- Butterfly: 100 and 200;
- Individual medley: 200 and 400;
- Relays: 4 × 100 free, 4 × 200 free, and 4 × 100 medley.

=== Schedule ===
Legend
H	Heats	½	Semi-finals	F	Final

Men
Date →	Sep 16		Sep 17		Sep 18		Sep 19		Sep 20		Sep 21		Sep 22		Sep 23	
Events ↓	M	E	M	E	M	E	M	E	M	E	M	E	M	E	M	E
50 m freestyle											H	½		F		
100 m freestyle							H	½		F						
200 m freestyle			H	½		F										
400 m freestyle	H	F														
1500 m freestyle													H			F
100 m backstroke			H	½		F										
200 m backstroke									H	½		F				
100 m breaststroke	H	½		F												
200 m breaststroke							H	½		F						
100 m butterfly											H	½		F		
200 m butterfly					H	½		F								
200 m individual medley									H	½		F				
400 m individual medley			H	F												
4 × 100 m freestyle relay	H	F														
4 × 200 m freestyle relay							H	F								
4 × 100 m medley relay													H			F

Women
Date →	Sep 16		Sep 17		Sep 18		Sep 19		Sep 20		Sep 21		Sep 22		Sep 23	
Event ↓	M	E	M	E	M	E	M	E	M	E	M	E	M	E	M	E
50 m freestyle													H	½		F
100 m freestyle									H	½		F				
200 m freestyle					H	½		F								
400 m freestyle			H	F												
800 m freestyle											H			F		
100 m backstroke			H	½		F										
200 m backstroke											H	½		F		
100 m breaststroke			H	½		F										
200 m breaststroke									H	½		F				
100 m butterfly	H	½		F												
200 m butterfly							H	½		F						
200 m individual medley					H	½		F								
400 m individual medley	H	F														
4 × 100 m freestyle relay	H	F														
4 × 200 m freestyle relay									H	F						
4 × 100 m medley relay													H			F

== Participating nations ==
A total of 954 swimmers (558 men and 336 women) from 150 nations would compete in swimming events at these Olympic Games. Aruba, Côte d'Ivoire, Dominican Republic, Equatorial Guinea, Georgia, Guinea, Iraq, Laos, Mali, Federated States of Micronesia, Mongolia, Niger, Qatar, Rwanda, Saint Vincent and the Grenadines, Sudan, and Tajikistan made their official debut in swimming. The full list of participating NOCs is the following:

- Algeria (3 athletes)
- Andorra (2)
- Angola (2)
- Argentina (13)
- Armenia (2)
- Aruba (2)
- Australia (44)
- Austria (8)
- Azerbaijan (2)
- Bahamas (4)
- Bahrain (2)
- Bangladesh (2)
- Barbados (3)
- Belarus (9)
- Belgium (9)
- Bermuda (1)
- Bolivia (2)
- Bosnia and Herzegovina (2)
- Brazil (13)
- Bulgaria (6)
- Cambodia (2)
- Canada (39)
- Chile (2)
- China (21)
- Colombia (5)
- Republic of the Congo (2)
- Costa Rica (3)
- Ivory Coast (1)
- Croatia (17)
- Cuba (7)
- Cyprus (7)
- Czech Republic (6)
- Denmark (7)
- Dominica (2)
- Dominican Republic (1)
- Ecuador (3)
- Egypt (6)
- El Salvador (1)
- Equatorial Guinea (2)
- Estonia (4)
- Fiji (2)
- Finland (7)
- France (19)
- Georgia (1)
- Germany (35)
- Great Britain (41)
- Greece (14)
- Grenada (1)
- Guam (1)
- Guatemala (1)
- Guinea (2)
- Honduras (2)
- Hong Kong (9)
- Hungary (18)
- Iceland (9)
- India (2)
- Indonesia (6)
- Iran (1)
- Iraq (2)
- Ireland (4)
- Israel (10)
- Italy (21)
- Jamaica (2)
- Japan (21)
- Jordan (2)
- Kazakhstan (8)
- Kenya (2)
- South Korea (17)
- Kuwait (2)
- Kyrgyzstan (18)
- Laos (1)
- Latvia (4)
- Lebanon (2)
- Lithuania (6)
- Luxembourg (3)
- Macedonia (4)
- Madagascar (2)
- Malaysia (9)
- Maldives (2)
- Mali (2)
- Malta (2)
- Mauritius (2)
- Mexico (7)
- Federated States of Micronesia (2)
- Moldova (10)
- Monaco (1)
- Mongolia (2)
- Morocco (1)
- Mozambique (2)
- Myanmar (1)
- Namibia (1)
- Nepal (2)
- Netherlands (24)
- Netherlands Antilles (2)
- New Zealand (8)
- Nicaragua (2)
- Niger (2)
- Nigeria (2)
- Oman (1)
- Pakistan (1)
- Palau (2)
- Palestine (1)
- Panama (2)
- Papua New Guinea (2)
- Paraguay (2)
- Peru (3)
- Philippines (4)
- Poland (8)
- Portugal (7)
- Puerto Rico (3)
- Qatar (1)
- Romania (11)
- Russia (28)
- Rwanda (2)
- Saint Lucia (2)
- Saint Vincent and the Grenadines (2)
- San Marino (1)
- Saudi Arabia (1)
- Senegal (2)
- Seychelles (2)
- Singapore (8)
- Slovakia (4)
- Slovenia (6)
- South Africa (14)
- Spain (23)
- Sri Lanka (2)
- Sudan (1)
- Suriname (2)
- Swaziland (2)
- Sweden (16)
- Switzerland (9)
- Syria (2)
- Chinese Taipei (13)
- Tajikistan (2)
- Thailand (8)
- Trinidad and Tobago (3)
- Tunisia (1)
- Turkey (7)
- Uganda (2)
- Ukraine (25)
- United Arab Emirates (1)
- United States (48)
- Uruguay (4)
- Uzbekistan (10)
- Venezuela (5)
- Vietnam (2)
- Virgin Islands (1)
- FR Yugoslavia (9)
- Zambia (2)
- Zimbabwe (3)

== Medal table ==
* Host nation (Australia)

Rank	Nation	Gold	Silver	Bronze	Total
1	United States	14	8	11	33
2	Australia*	5	9	4	18
3	Netherlands	5	1	2	8
4	Italy	3	1	2	6
5	Ukraine	2	2	0	4
6	Romania	2	1	1	4
7	Sweden	1	2	1	4
8	Hungary	1	0	0	1
9	Japan	0	2	2	4
10	Slovakia	0	2	0	2
11	Russia	0	1	1	2
11	South Africa	0	1	1	2
13	France	0	1	0	1
14	Germany	0	0	3	3
15	Costa Rica	0	0	2	2
16	Brazil	0	0	1	1
16	Canada	0	0	1	1
16	Spain	0	0	1	1
Totals (18 entries)		33	31	33	97

== Medal summary ==
=== Men's events ===
Games	Gold		Silver		Bronze	
50 m freestyle	Anthony Ervin; United States; Gary Hall Jr. United States	21.98	Not awarded as there was a tie for gold.		Pieter van den Hoogenband; Netherlands	22.03 NR
100 m freestyle	Pieter van den Hoogenband; Netherlands	48.30	Aleksandr Popov; Russia	48.69	Gary Hall Jr. United States	48.73
200 m freestyle	Pieter van den Hoogenband; Netherlands	1:45.35 =WR	Ian Thorpe; Australia	1:45.83	Massimiliano Rosolino; Italy	1:46.65
400 m freestyle	Ian Thorpe; Australia	3:40.59 WR	Massimiliano Rosolino; Italy	3:43.40 ER	Klete Keller; United States	3:47.00 AM
1500 m freestyle	Grant Hackett; Australia	14:48.33	Kieren Perkins; Australia	14:53.59	Chris Thompson; United States	14:56.81 AM
100 m backstroke	Lenny Krayzelburg; United States	53.72 OR	Matt Welsh; Australia	54.07 OC	Stev Theloke; Germany	54.82 NR
200 m backstroke	Lenny Krayzelburg; United States	1:56.76 OR	Aaron Peirsol; United States	1:57.35	Matt Welsh; Australia	1:57.59 OC
100 m breaststroke	Domenico Fioravanti; Italy	1:00.46 OR	Ed Moses; United States	1:00.73 AM	Roman Sloudnov; Russia	1:00.91
200 m breaststroke	Domenico Fioravanti; Italy	2:10.87 ER	Terence Parkin; South Africa	2:12.50 AF	Davide Rummolo; Italy	2:12.73
100 m butterfly	Lars Frölander; Sweden	52.00 ER	Michael Klim; Australia	52.18	Geoff Huegill; Australia	52.22
200 m butterfly	Tom Malchow; United States	1:55.35 OR	Denys Sylantyev; Ukraine	1:55.76 NR	Justin Norris; Australia	1:56.17 OC
200 m individual medley	Massimiliano Rosolino; Italy	1:58.98 OR, NR	Tom Dolan; United States	1:59.77 AM	Tom Wilkens; United States	2:00.87
400 m individual medley	Tom Dolan; United States	4:11.76 WR	Erik Vendt; United States	4:14.23	Curtis Myden; Canada	4:15.33 NR
4 × 100 m freestyle relay	Australia; Michael Klim (48.18) WR; Chris Fydler (48.48); Ashley Callus (48.71); Ian Thorpe (48.30); Todd Pearson*; Adam Pine*	3:13.67 WR	United States; Anthony Ervin (48.89); Neil Walker (48.31); Jason Lezak (48.42); Gary Hall Jr. (48.24); Scott Tucker*; Josh Davis*	3:13.86 AM	Brazil; Fernando Scherer (49.79); Gustavo Borges (48.61); Carlos Jayme (49.88); Edvaldo Valério (49.12)	3:17.40
4 × 200 m freestyle relay	Australia; Ian Thorpe (1:46.03); Michael Klim (1:46.40); Todd Pearson (1:47.36); Bill Kirby (1:47.26); Grant Hackett*; Daniel Kowalski*	7:07.05 WR	United States; Scott Goldblatt (1:49.66); Josh Davis (1:46.49); Jamie Rauch (1:48.74); Klete Keller (1:47.75); Nate Dusing*; Chad Carvin*	7:12.64	Netherlands; Martijn Zuijdweg (1:49.89); Johan Kenkhuis (1:49.37); Marcel Wouda (1:48.56); Pieter van den Hoogenband (1:44.88); Mark van der Zijden*	7:12.70 NR
4 × 100 m medley relay	United States; Lenny Krayzelburg (53.87); Ed Moses (59.84); Ian Crocker (52.10); Gary Hall Jr. (47.92); Neil Walker*; Tommy Hannan*; Jason Lezak*	3:33.73 WR	Australia; Matt Welsh (54.29); Regan Harrison (1:01.48); Geoff Huegill (51.33); Michael Klim (48.17); Josh Watson*; Ryan Mitchell*; Adam Pine*; Ian Thorpe*	3:35.27 OC	Germany; Stev Theloke (55.07); Jens Kruppa (1:00.52); Thomas Rupprath (52.14); Torsten Spanneberg (48.15)	3:35.88 ER

* Swimmers who participated in the heats only and received medals.

=== Women's events ===
Games	Gold		Silver		Bronze	
50 m freestyle	Inge de Bruijn; Netherlands	24.32	Therese Alshammar; Sweden	24.51	Dara Torres; United States	24.63 AM
100 m freestyle	Inge de Bruijn; Netherlands	53.83	Therese Alshammar; Sweden	54.33 NR	Dara Torres; United States; Jenny Thompson; United States	54.43
200 m freestyle	Susie O'Neill; Australia	1:58.24	Martina Moravcová; Slovakia	1:58.32 NR	Claudia Poll; Costa Rica	1:58.81
400 m freestyle	Brooke Bennett; United States	4:05.80	Diana Munz; United States	4:07.07	Claudia Poll; Costa Rica	4:07.83
800 m freestyle	Brooke Bennett; United States	8:19.67 OR	Yana Klochkova; Ukraine	8:22.66 NR	Kaitlin Sandeno; United States	8:24.29
100 m backstroke	Diana Mocanu; Romania	1:00.21 OR, NR	Mai Nakamura; Japan	1:00.55 NR	Nina Zhivanevskaya; Spain	1:00.89 NR
200 m backstroke	Diana Mocanu; Romania	2:08.16 NR	Roxana Maracineanu; France	2:10.25 NR	Miki Nakao; Japan	2:11.05
100 m breaststroke	Megan Quann; United States	1:07.05 AM	Leisel Jones; Australia	1:07.49 OC	Penny Heyns; South Africa	1:07.55
200 m breaststroke	Ágnes Kovács; Hungary	2:24.35	Kristy Kowal; United States	2:24.56 AM	Amanda Beard; United States	2:25.35
100 m butterfly	Inge de Bruijn; Netherlands	56.61 WR	Martina Moravcová; Slovakia	57.97 NR	Dara Torres; United States	58.20
200 m butterfly	Misty Hyman; United States	2:05.88 OR, AM	Susie O'Neill; Australia	2:06.58	Petria Thomas; Australia	2:07.12
200 m individual medley	Yana Klochkova; Ukraine	2:10.68 OR, ER	Beatrice Câșlaru; Romania	2:12.57 NR	Cristina Teuscher; United States	2:13.32
400 m individual medley	Yana Klochkova; Ukraine	4:33.59 WR	Yasuko Tajima; Japan	4:35.96 NR	Beatrice Câșlaru; Romania	4:37.18 NR
4 × 100 m freestyle relay	United States; Amy Van Dyken (55.08); Dara Torres (53.51); Courtney Shealy (54.40); Jenny Thompson (53.62); Erin Phenix*; Ashley Tappin*	3:36.61 WR	Netherlands; Manon van Rooijen (56.35); Wilma van Hofwegen (55.19); Thamar Henneken (54.88); Inge de Bruijn (53.41); Chantal Groot*	3:39.83 ER	Sweden; Louise Jöhncke (55.93); Therese Alshammar (53.78); Johanna Sjöberg (55.06); Anna-Karin Kammerling (55.53); Josefin Lillhage*; Malin Svahnström*	3:40.30 NR
4 × 200 m freestyle relay	United States; Samantha Arsenault (1:59.92); Diana Munz (1:59.19); Lindsay Benko (1:59.34); Jenny Thompson (1:59.35); Julia Stowers*; Kim Black*	7:57.80 OR	Australia; Susie O'Neill (1:58.70); Giaan Rooney (1:59.37); Kirsten Thomson (2:00.13); Petria Thomas (2:00.32); Jacinta van Lint*; Elka Graham*	7:58.52 OC	Germany; Franziska van Almsick; Antje Buschschulte; Sara Harstick; Kerstin Kielgass; Meike Freitag*; Britta Steffen*	7:58.64
4 × 100 m medley relay	United States; Barbara Bedford (1:01.39); Megan Quann (1:06.29); Jenny Thompson (57.25); Dara Torres (53.37); Courtney Shealy*; Ashley Tappin*; Amy Van Dyken*; Staciana Stitts*	3:58.30 WR	Australia; Dyana Calub (1:01.83); Leisel Jones (1:08.08); Petria Thomas (57.39); Susie O'Neill (54.29); Giaan Rooney*; Tarnee White*; Sarah Ryan*	4:01.59 OC	Japan; Masami Tanaka (1:02.08); Sumika Minamoto (1:08.65); Mai Nakamura (58.72); Junko Onishi (54.71)	4:04.16 NR

* Swimmers who participated in the heats only and received medals.
