= Swimming at the 2000 Summer Olympics – Women's 200 metre freestyle =

Women's 200-metre freestyle at the Games of the XXVII Olympiad
- Venue: Sydney International Aquatic Centre
- Date: 18 September 2000 (heats & semi-finals); 19 September 2000 (final)
- Competitors: 41 from 35 nations
- Winning time: 1:58.24

Medalists
1st place, gold medalist(s)		Susie O'Neill	Australia
2nd place, silver medalist(s)		Martina Moravcová	Slovakia
3rd place, bronze medalist(s)		Claudia Poll	Costa Rica

The women's 200-metre freestyle event at the 2000 Summer Olympics took place on 18–19 September at the Sydney International Aquatic Centre in Sydney.

Australia's overwhelming favorite Susie O'Neill, dubbed as Madame Butterfly, gave the home crowd a further reason to celebrate, as she claimed the gold medal in the event. Rocketed to the boisterous chants of "Susie, Susie" by her swimming fans, O'Neill held off a challenge from Slovakia's Martina Moravcová to strengthen her lead on the final lap before hitting the wall first in 1:58.24. Moravcova trailed behind by a small fraction of a second to capture another silver at these Games in 1:58.32, while Costa Rica's Claudia Poll, defending Olympic champion, added a second bronze to her hardware from the 400 m freestyle, in a sterling time of 1:58.81.

Russia's Nadezhda Chemezova and Germany's Kerstin Kielgass tied for fourth place in a matching time of 1:58.86, finishing off the podium by just five-hundredths of a second (0.05). Belarus' Natalya Baranovskaya pulled off a sixth-place finish in a national record of 1:59.28, while Romania's Camelia Potec (1:59.46) and China's Wang Luna (1:59.55) closed out the field.

Notable swimmers failed to reach the top 8 final, featuring world-record holder Franziska van Almsick, who faded shortly on the final lap and finished eleventh in the semi-finals; South Africa's Helene Muller, who posted a second-fastest prelims time (1:59.89) earlier but ended up only in ninth; and American duo Lindsay Benko and Rada Owen, both of whom earned a twelfth and a sixteenth spot, respectively.

Shortly after the Games, O'Neill announced her retirement from swimming, and was elected to the IOC Athletes' Commission, along with ten other athletes.

The medals for the competition were presented by Roland Baar, IOC Member, Olympian, Bronze Medalist in Barcelona, and Silver Medalist in Atlanta, Germany; and the medalists' bouquets were presented by Francis Luyce, FINA Bureau Member; France.

== Records ==
Prior to this competition, the existing world and Olympic records were as follows.

World record	Franziska van Almsick (GER)	1:56.78	Rome, Italy	6 September 1994
Olympic record	Heike Friedrich (GDR)	1:57.65	Seoul, South Korea	21 September 1988

== Results ==
=== Heats ===
Rank	Heat	Lane	Name	Nationality	Time	Notes
1	6	4	Susie O'Neill	Australia	1:59.14	Q
2	4	2	Helene Muller	South Africa	1:59.89	Q, AF
3	5	4	Claudia Poll	Costa Rica	2:00.11	Q
4	6	5	Lindsay Benko	United States	2:00.13	Q
5	4	4	Camelia Potec	Romania	2:00.18	Q
6	6	6	Kerstin Kielgaß	Germany	2:00.25	Q
7	5	5	Franziska van Almsick	Germany	2:00.37	Q
8	4	5	Martina Moravcová	Slovakia	2:00.46	Q
9	5	6	Nadezhda Chemezova	Russia	2:00.47	Q
10	4	3	Natalya Baranovskaya	Belarus	2:00.58	Q
11	6	1	Carla Geurts	Netherlands	2:00.60	Q
12	6	3	Wang Luna	China	2:00.89	Q
13	5	3	Giaan Rooney	Australia	2:00.99	Q
14	4	8	Mandy Leach	Zimbabwe	2:01.05	Q, NR
15	5	7	Rada Owen	United States	2:01.10	Q
16	4	1	Sara Parise	Italy	2:01.31	Q
17	5	2	Yang Yu	China	2:01.34	
18	6	2	Jessica Deglau	Canada	2:01.42	
18	4	7	Karen Pickering	Great Britain	2:01.42	
20	4	6	Solenne Figuès	France	2:01.46	
21	3	1	Rania Elwani	Egypt	2:01.93	NR
22	5	1	Nina van Koeckhoven	Belgium	2:02.15	
23	6	8	Laura Nicholls	Canada	2:02.69	
24	5	8	Laura Roca	Spain	2:03.37	
25	3	2	Zoi Dimoschaki	Greece	2:04.06	
26	3	5	Olena Lapunova	Ukraine	2:04.39	
27	2	5	Lára Hrund Bjargardóttir	Iceland	2:05.22	
28	3	4	Chantal Gibney	Ireland	2:05.24	
29	2	6	Vesna Stojanovska	Macedonia	2:05.58	
30	3	8	Pilin Tachakittiranan	Thailand	2:05.88	
31	3	3	Elina Partõka	Estonia	2:05.90	
32	3	6	Tsai Shu-min	Chinese Taipei	2:06.12	
33	3	7	Roh Joo-hee	South Korea	2:07.21	
34	2	7	Ivanka Moralieva	Bulgaria	2:07.61	
35	2	3	Anna Korshikova	Kyrgyzstan	2:08.08	
36	2	2	Petra Banović	Croatia	2:08.30	
37	1	4	Nisha Millet	India	2:08.89	
38	1	5	Pamela Vásquez	Honduras	2:15.83	
39	1	3	Marella Mamoun	Syria	2:18.78	
	2	4	Florencia Szigeti	Argentina	DSQ	
	6	7	Karen Legg	Great Britain	DNS	

=== Semi-finals ===
==== Semi-final 1 ====
Rank	Lane	Name	Nationality	Time	Notes
1	6	Martina Moravcová	Slovakia	1:59.75	Q
2	3	Kerstin Kielgaß	Germany	1:59.78	Q
3	2	Natalya Baranovskaya	Belarus	1:59.90	Q, NR
4	7	Wang Luna	China	1:59.97	Q
5	4	Helene Muller	South Africa	2:00.04	
6	8	Sara Parise	Italy	2:00.07	
7	5	Lindsay Benko	United States	2:00.27	
8	1	Mandy Leach	Zimbabwe	2:00.60	

==== Semi-final 2 ====
Rank	Lane	Name	Nationality	Time	Notes
1	4	Susie O'Neill	Australia	1:59.37	Q
2	3	Camelia Potec	Romania	1:59.54	Q
3	5	Claudia Poll	Costa Rica	1:59.63	Q
4	2	Nadezhda Chemezova	Russia	1:59.69	Q
5	6	Franziska van Almsick	Germany	2:00.26	
6	1	Giaan Rooney	Australia	2:00.84	
7	7	Carla Geurts	Netherlands	2:00.88	
8	8	Rada Owen	United States	2:03.34	

=== Final ===
Rank	Lane	Name	Nationality	Time	Notes
1st place, gold medalist(s)	4	Susie O'Neill	Australia	1:58.24	
2nd place, silver medalist(s)	2	Martina Moravcová	Slovakia	1:58.32	
3rd place, bronze medalist(s)	3	Claudia Poll	Costa Rica	1:58.81	
4	6	Nadezhda Chemezova	Russia	1:58.86	
4	7	Kerstin Kielgaß	Germany	1:58.86	
6	1	Natalya Baranovskaya	Belarus	1:59.28	NR
7	5	Camelia Potec	Romania	1:59.46	
8	8	Wang Luna	China	1:59.55	
