= Swimming at the 1998 World Aquatics Championships – Women's 400 metre freestyle =

Women's 400 metre freestyle at the 1998 FINA World Championships
- Date: 14 January 1998
- Winning time: 4 minutes 06.72 seconds

Medalists
gold medal	Chen Yan	China
silver medal	Brooke Bennett	United States
bronze medal	Dagmar Hase	Germany

The finals and the qualifying heats of the women's 400 metre freestyle event at the 1998 World Aquatics Championships were held on Wednesday 14 January 1998 in Perth, Western Australia.

== A Final ==
Rank	Name	Time
Gold medal	Chen Yan (CHN)	4:06.72
Silver medal	Brooke Bennett (USA)	4:07.07
Bronze medal	Dagmar Hase (GER)	4:08.82
4	Kirsten Vlieghuis (NED)	4:09.14
5	Julia Greville (AUS)	4:11.59
6	Diana Munz (USA)	4:11.70
7	Jana Henke (GER)	4:11.92
8	Claudia Poll (CRC)	4:12.08

== B Final ==
Rank	Name	Time
9	Shu-Min Tsai (TPE)	4:12.94
10	Joanne Malar (CAN)	4:14.31
11	Carla Geurts (NED)	4:14.61
12	Simona Păduraru (ROM)	4:15.58
13	Victoria Horner (GBR)	4:15.79
14	Nadezda Chemezova (RUS)	4:16.51
15	Tatyana Mikhailova (RUS)	4:18.25
16	Natasha Bowron (AUS)	4:20.50

== See also ==
- 1996 Women's Olympic Games 400m Freestyle (Atlanta)
- 1997 Women's World SC Championships 400m Freestyle (Gothenburg)
- 1997 Women's European LC Championships 400m Freestyle (Seville)
- 2000 Women's Olympic Games 400m Freestyle (Sydney)
