= Swimming at the 1998 World Aquatics Championships – Women's 800 metre freestyle =

Women's 800 metre freestyle at the 1998 FINA World Championships
- Date: 16 January 1998 (heats0 17 January 1998 (final)
- Winning time: 8 minutes 28.71 seconds

Medalists
gold medal	Brooke Bennett	United States
silver medal	Diana Munz	United States
bronze medal	Kirsten Vlieghuis	Netherlands

The final of the women's 800 metre freestyle event at the 1998 World Aquatics Championships was held on Saturday 17 January 1998 in Perth, Western Australia.

== Final ==
Rank	Name	Time
Gold medal	Brooke Bennett (USA)	8:28.71
Silver medal	Diana Munz (USA)	8:29.97
Bronze medal	Kirsten Vlieghuis (NED)	8:32.34
4	Jana Henke (GER)	8:33.52
5	Kerstin Kielgass (GER)	8:33.62
6	Flavia Rigamonti (SUI)	8:37.37
7	Carla Geurts (NED)	8:41.76
8	Chen Hua (CHN)	8:47.85

== Qualifying heats ==
- Held on Friday 16 January 1998

Rank	Name	Time
1	Brooke Bennett (USA)	8:30.68
2	Diana Munz (USA)	8:34.87
3	Kirsten Vlieghuis (NED)	8:35.75
4	Jana Henke (GER)	8:36.00
5	Kerstin Kielgass (GER)	8:37.53
6	Flavia Rigamonti (SUI)	8:37.55
7	Carla Geurts (NED)	8:42.68
8	Chen Hua (CHN)	8:43.84
9	Nadine Neumann (AUS)	8:46.47
10	María Bardina (ESP)	8:46.96
11	Sofie Goffin (BEL)	8:50.43
12	Tatyana Mikhaylova (RUS)	8:50.56
13	Jana Pechanová (CZE)	8:54.37
14	Mirjana Boševska (MKD)	8:55.08
15	Andrea Schwartz (CAN)	8:57.51
16	Carolyn Adel (SUR)	9:00.50
17	Chi-Chan Lin (TPE)	9:01.74
18	Natasha Bowron (AUS)	9:02.31
19	Kristýna Kyněrová (CZE)	9:03.35

== See also ==
- 1996 Women's Olympic Games 800m Freestyle (Atlanta)
- 1997 Women's World SC Championships 800m Freestyle (Gothenburg)
- 1997 Women's European LC Championships 800m Freestyle (Seville)
- 2000 Women's Olympic Games 800m Freestyle (Sydney)
