= 1997 FINA Short Course World Championships – Women's 400m freestyle =

The finals and the qualifying heats of the women's 400 metres freestyle event at the 1997 FINA Short Course World Championships were held on the third day of the competition, on Saturday 19 April 1997 in Gothenburg, Sweden.

== Finals ==
RANK	FINAL A	TIME
	Claudia Poll (CRC)	4:00.03 WR
	Natasha Bowron (AUS)	4:05.76
	Kerstin Kielgass (GER)	4:07.13
4.	Wang Luna (CHN)	4:08.27
5.	Julia Greville (AUS)	4:09.81
6.	Carla Geurts (NED)	4:10.02
7.	Jennifer Parmenter (USA)	4:11.78
8.	Jana Pechanová (CZE)	4:14.54

RANK	FINAL B	TIME
9.	Britt Raaby (DEN)	4:10.71
10.	Malin Nilsson (SWE)	4:11.54
11.	Anna Simoni (ITA)	4:13.00
12.	Victoria Horner (GBR)	4:13.29
13.	Flavia Rigamonti (SUI)	4:13.89
14.	Desiree Beckers (GER)	4:14.11
15.	Laura Nicholls (CAN)	4:14.32
16.	Kristýna Kyněrová (CZE)	4:16.83

== Qualifying heats ==
RANK	HEAT RANKINGS	TIME
1.	Natasha Bowron (AUS)	4:08.72
2.	Claudia Poll (CRC)	4:08.93
3.	Kerstin Kielgass (GER)	4:09.24
4.	Jennifer Parmenter (USA)	4:09.39
5.	Carla Geurts (NED)	4:09.91
6.	Wang Luna (CHN)	4:10.34
7.	Julia Greville (AUS)	4:10.45
8.	Jana Pechanová (CZE)	4:14.09
9.	Laura Nicholls (CAN)	4:14.26
10.	Anna Simoni (ITA)	4:14.42
11.	Desiree Beckers (GER)	4:14.43
12.	Kristýna Kyněrová (CZE)	4:14.56
13.	Malin Nilsson (SWE)	4:14.64
14.	Britt Raaby (DEN)	4:15.67
15.	Victoria Horner (GBR)	4:15.88
16.	Flavia Rigamonti (SUI)	4:17.15
17.	Ana Alegria (POR)	4:17.56
18.	Jessica Deglau (CAN)	4:17.59
19.	Rutai Santadvatana (THA)	4:18.47
20.	Mirjana Boševska (MKD)	4:19.42
21.	Asa Sandlund (SWE)	4:19.65

== See also ==
- 1996 Women's Olympic Games 400m Freestyle
- 1997 Women's European LC Championships 400m Freestyle
