= Julia Stowers =

American swimmer (born 1982)

Julia Dilworth
Personal information
- Full name: Julia Gray Stowers
- National team: United States
- Born: March 18, 1982 (age 44) Knoxville, Tennessee, U.S.
- Height: 6 ft 1 in (1.85 m)
- Weight: 146 lb (66 kg)

Sport
- Sport: Swimming
- Strokes: Freestyle
- Club: Pilot Aquatic Club
- College team: University of Georgia; University of Tennessee
- Coach: Gardner Howland (Pilot Aquatic); Jack Bauerle (U. of Georgia); Dan Colella (U. Tennessee)
Medal record
Women's swimming
Representing the United States
Olympic Games
Gold medal – first place	2000 Sydney	4x200 m freestyle
Pan American Games
Silver medal – second place	1999 Winnipeg	4×200 m freestyle

Julia Gray Stowers (born March 18, 1982), later known in some media by her married name Julia Stowers Dilworth is an American former competition swimmer who competed for the University of Georgia and the University of Tennessee and represented the U.S. at the 2000 Sydney Olympics where she won a gold medalist in the 4x200-meter freestyle relay. After graduating the University of Tennessee, and law school at the University of Memphis, she served as a state attorney in greater Memphis, eventually serving as an Assistant District Attorney.

Julia Stowers, was born March 18, 1982 to Eugene S. Stowers III and Suzanne Stowers in Knoxville, Tennessee. She was swimming competitively by the age of 12 with the high achieving and elite Pilot Aquatic Club in Knoxville under Head Coach Gardner Howland, who coached the Pilot team from September 1994-2008, and was a former swimmer for the University of Tennessee. Stowers attended the Webb School of Knoxville as a seventh grader in 1995, and later graduated greater Knoxville's West High School in June 2000. During High School, she was an All American eleven times, and was a Female Swimmer of the Year for Tennessee for three years including 1997 and 1998. Her demanding High school practices frequently consisted of a ninety minute before school session and an after school early evening session of two hours, five days a week, with a three hour morning session on Saturday. After graduating West High, she first attended the University of Georgia on a swimming scholarship, but transferred to the University of Tennessee, where she graduated around 2005.

Stowers won a silver medal at the 1999 Pan American Games in Winnipeg in the Women's 4×200 m freestyle relay, a signature event.

== 2000 Sydney Olympics ==
At the 2000 Olympic swim trials in Indianapolis, Stowers swam a 4:12.71 in the 400 meter freestyle. She swam a fourth place again in the 200 meter freestyle finals with a time of 2:01.16, which did qualify her for the 4x200 freestyle relay team, as the top six finishers qualified for the U.S. team.

At the age of 18, at the 2000 Summer Olympics in Sydney, Australia, Stowers earned a gold medal swimming for the winning U.S. team in the preliminary heats of the women's 4×200-meter freestyle relay. She swam the second leg of the 4x200 meter preliminary which recorded a combined time of 4:00:89 with team members Samantha Arsenault, with whom she would later attend the University of Georgia, Kim Black and Diana Munz. Later the finals team swam a combined time of 7:57.80 winning the gold, with the Australian team taking the silver with a combined time of 7:58.52, and the German team taking the bronze with a combined time of 7:58.64.

=== College ===
Stowers competed first on an athletic scholarship for the University of Georgia Women's team under Hall of fame Coach Jack Bauerle. A strong team, Bauerle led the Georgia women's team to NCAA Championships in 1999, 2000, and 2001, also winning titles in the Southeastern Conference in both the years 2000 and 2001. Moving back home, Julia transferred to University of Tennessee Women's Swimming Team from around 2002-2005 in Knoxville, Tennessee, under Head Coach Dan Colella, who coached the Lady Vols swim team from 1993-2005. As a Senior, at the 2005 NCAA Championships, Stowers became a three-time All American by placing seventh with a School record time of 16:07.57 in the 1650-yard freestyle. She also broke the school record in the 1000-yard freestyle by 5 seconds with a time of 9:48.29. She also became an All American with her 14th place finish in the 500-yard freestyle with a time of 4:45.69.

Stowers continued to train with the Pilot Aquatic Club under Gardner Howland in preparation for the 2004 Olympics.

=== Post swimming education, careers ===
After graduating with a bachelor's degree in sociology from the University of Tennessee, Stowers attended the University of Memphis to pursue a J.D. degree, where she clerked for criminal court judges. After passing the bar examination in 2011, she served as a state prosecutor in the Memphis area, serving in the General Sessions Criminal Court, and eventually reached the position of greater Memphis's Shelby County Assistant District Attorney. She continued to swim in 2012, and volunteered for Make-a-Splash which teaches swimming to inner city children. In 2021 Stowers started as a volunteer assistant coach for the swim teams at Delta State University in Cleveland, Mississippi.

She married Parker William Dilworth, a graduate of Delta University and originally of Memphis, likely during her law career, and is referred to as Julia Dilworth in media, particularly her bio at Delta University. She appears to have retained the name Julia Stowers in her professional career.

== See also ==
- List of Olympic medalists in swimming (women)
- List of University of Tennessee people
