= 1997 FINA Short Course World Championships – Women's 800m freestyle =

The final and the qualifying heats of the women's 800 metres freestyle event at the 1997 FINA Short Course World Championships were held on the second day of the competition, on Friday 18 April 1997 in Gothenburg, Sweden.

== Finals ==
RANK	FINAL A	TIME
	Natasha Bowron (AUS)	8:26.45
	Kerstin Kielgass (GER)	8:28.10
	Carla Geurts (NED)	8:28.96
4.	Rachel Harris (AUS)	8:29.27
5.	Jana Pechanová (CZE)	8:33.40
6.	Flavia Rigamonti (SUI)	8:34.37
7.	Jennifer Parmenter (USA)	8:34.74
8.	Anna Simoni (ITA)	8:37.66

RANK	NON-QUALIFIERS	TIME
9.	Ann Jonsson (SWE)	8:39.72
10.	Desiree Beckers (GER)	8:39.78
11.	Andrea Schwartz (CAN)	8:44.72
12.	Chantal Strasser (SUI)	8:45.61
13.	Rutai Santadvatana (THA)	8:47.36
14.	Mirjana Boševska (MKD)	8:47.74
15.	Asa Sandlund (SWE)	8:50.18
16.	Kristýna Kyněrová (CZE)	8:56.87
17.	María del Pilar Pereyra (ARG)	8:57.08
18.	Juliana Filippini (BRA)	8:58.68

== See also ==
- 1996 Women's Olympic Games 800m Freestyle
- 1997 Women's European LC Championships 800m Freestyle
