= Swimming at the 1998 Asian Games – Women's 400 metre freestyle =

Women's 400 metre freestyle at the 1998 Asian Games
- Venue: Thammasat Aquatic Center
- Date: 9 December 1998
- Competitors: 13 from 8 nations

Medalists
gold medal	Chen Hua	China
silver medal	Sachiko Yamada	Japan
bronze medal	Tsai Shu-min	Chinese Taipei

The women's 400 metre freestyle swimming competition at the 1998 Asian Games in Bangkok was held on 9 December at the Thammasat Aquatic Center.

== Schedule ==
All times are Indochina Time (UTC+07:00)

Date	Time	Event
Wednesday, 9 December 1998	09:00	Heats
Wednesday, 9 December 1998	18:00	Final

== Results ==
Legend

- DNS — Did not start

=== Heats ===
Rank	Heat	Athlete	Time	Notes
1	1	Chen Hua (CHN)	4:18.14	
2	1	Sachiko Yamada (JPN)	4:21.27	
3	1	Tsai Shu-min (TPE)	4:23.82	
4	1	Ravee Intaporn-udom (THA)	4:24.40	
5	2	Lin Chi-chan (TPE)	4:26.34	
6	2	Eri Yamanoi (JPN)	4:26.76	
7	2	Rutai Santadvatana (THA)	4:29.09	
8	1	Cheryl Chong (SIN)	4:31.78	
9	2	Lee Eun-hae (KOR)	4:35.32	
10	2	Marella Mamoun (SYR)	4:45.54	
11	1	Pang Shuk Mui (HKG)	4:48.12	
—	2	Robyn Lamsam (HKG)	DNS	
—	2	Chen Yan (CHN)	DNS	

=== Final ===
Rank	Athlete	Time	Notes
1st place, gold medalist(s)	Chen Hua (CHN)	4:12.31	GR
2nd place, silver medalist(s)	Sachiko Yamada (JPN)	4:14.53	
3rd place, bronze medalist(s)	Tsai Shu-min (TPE)	4:15.66	
4	Eri Yamanoi (JPN)	4:18.23	
5	Ravee Intaporn-udom (THA)	4:21.48	
6	Lin Chi-chan (TPE)	4:21.57	
7	Rutai Santadvatana (THA)	4:28.42	
8	Cheryl Chong (SIN)	4:28.87	
