= Peder Marcussen =

Danish artistic gymnast

- Full name: Peder Andreas Marinus Marcussen
- Born: 26 November 1894 Guldager, Denmark
- Died: 16 December 1972 (aged 78) Esbjerg, Denmark

Gymnastics career
- Discipline: Men's artistic gymnastics
- Country represented: Denmark
Medal record
Men's artistic gymnastics
Representing Denmark
Olympic Games
Gold medal – first place	1920 Antwerp	Team, free system

Peder Andreas Marinus Marcussen (26 November 1894 in Guldager, Denmark – 16 December 1972 in Esbjerg, Denmark) was a Danish gymnast who competed in the 1920 Summer Olympics. He was part of the Danish team, which was able to win the gold medal in the gymnastics men's team, free system event in 1920.
