= Jacinta van Lint =

Australian swimmer

Personal information
- Full name: Jacinta van Lint
- National team: Australia
- Born: 27 March 1979 (age 47) Albury, New South Wales
- Height: 1.79 m (5 ft 10 in)
- Weight: 69 kg (152 lb)

Sport
- Sport: Swimming
- Strokes: Freestyle
Medal record
Women's swimming
Representing Australia
Olympic Games
Silver medal – second place	2000 Sydney	4×200 m freestyle
World Championships (SC)
Bronze medal – third place	1999 Hong Kong	4×200 m freestyle

Jacinta van Lint (born 27 March 1979) is an Australian freestyle swimmer who won a silver medal in the 4x200-metre freestyle relay at the 2000 Summer Olympics.

Training at the Australian Institute of Sport, van Lint swam in the heats, before the team of Susie O'Neill, Giaan Rooney, Kirsten Thomson and Petria Thomas trailed the United States team home in the final.

Following the Sydney 2000 Olympic Games, van Lint completed a bachelor's degree in arts and a master's degree in international studies at the University of Sydney, while competing and training with the University of Sydney club.

In 2013 van Lint completed a Certificate IV in Photoimaging, and now freelances as a photographer in Sydney and internationally. Her broad travel and volunteer experiences, and her recent work with indigenous groups at the Aurora Project has positioned her to focus her photographic work around humanitarian issues, frequently working with not for profit organisations in Australia and internationally.

== See also ==
- List of Olympic medalists in swimming (women)
