= Swimming at the 2004 Summer Olympics – Women's 200 metre freestyle =

Women's 200 metre freestyle at the Games of the XXVIII Olympiad
- Venue: Athens Olympic Aquatic Centre
- Date: August 16, 2004 (heats & semifinals); August 17, 2004 (final)
- Competitors: 41 from 36 nations
- Winning time: 1:58.03

Medalists
1st place, gold medalist(s)		Camelia Potec	Romania
2nd place, silver medalist(s)		Federica Pellegrini	Italy
3rd place, bronze medalist(s)		Solenne Figuès	France

The women's 200 metre freestyle event at the 2004 Olympic Games was contested at the Olympic Aquatic Centre of the Athens Olympic Sports Complex in Athens, Greece on August 16 and 17.

Camelia Potec became the second Romanian swimmer to claim a gold medal in swimming (the first being done by Diana Mocanu in Sydney), outside the record time of 1:58.03. The silver medal was awarded to 15-year-old Federica Pellegrini of Italy, who finished behind Potec by 0.19 of a second, clocking at 1:58.22. France's Solenne Figuès, on the other hand, took home the bronze in 1:58.45. World record holder Franziska van Almsick, however, finished outside of medals in fifth place, with a time of 1:58.88.

The medals for the competition were presented by Julio Maglione, IOC Member, Uruguay; and the medalists' bouquets were presented by Cornel Mărculescu, FINA Executive Director; Romania.

== Records ==
Prior to this competition, the existing world and Olympic records were as follows.

World record	Franziska van Almsick (GER)	1:56.64	Berlin, Germany	3 August 2002
Olympic record	Heike Friedrich (GDR)	1:57.65	Seoul, South Korea	21 September 1988

== Results ==
=== Heats ===
Rank	Heat	Lane	Name	Nationality	Time	Notes
1	4	2	Dana Vollmer	United States	1:59.49	Q
2	6	2	Claudia Poll	Costa Rica	1:59.50	Q
3	5	7	Paulina Barzycka	Poland	1:59.52	Q
4	5	6	Federica Pellegrini	Italy	1:59.80	Q
5	6	3	Solenne Figuès	France	1:59.90	Q
6	6	7	Josefin Lillhage	Sweden	2:00.04	Q
7	4	6	Elka Graham	Australia	2:00.13	Q
8	6	4	Lindsay Benko	United States	2:00.21	Q
9	6	5	Franziska van Almsick	Germany	2:00.23	Q
10	5	4	Melanie Marshall	Great Britain	2:00.46	Q
11	4	5	Camelia Potec	Romania	2:00.50	Q
12	5	3	Alena Popchanka	Belarus	2:00.67	Q
13	4	1	Tomoko Nagai	Japan	2:00.73	Q
14	5	5	Pang Jiaying	China	2:00.80	Q
15	4	3	Martina Moravcová	Slovakia	2:01.00	Q
16	4	4	Yang Yu	China	2:01.33	Q
17	6	8	Brittany Reimer	Canada	2:01.39	
18	4	7	Sara Isaković	Slovenia	2:01.71	
19	6	6	Linda Mackenzie	Australia	2:02.04	
20	5	2	Sara Harstick	Germany	2:02.25	
21	5	1	Nataliya Shalagina	Russia	2:02.37	
22	3	5	Olena Lapunova	Ukraine	2:02.71	
23	5	8	Mariana Brochado	Brazil	2:02.91	
24	3	3	Hanna Miluska	Switzerland	2:03.28	
25	3	1	Florencia Szigeti	Argentina	2:03.29	
26	4	8	Kim Hyun-joo	South Korea	2:03.33	
27	6	1	Zoi Dimoschaki	Greece	2:03.38	
28	3	4	Elina Partõka	Estonia	2:03.54	
29	3	2	Alison Fitch	New Zealand	2:03.58	
30	3	8	Janelle Atkinson	Jamaica	2:04.06	
31	3	7	Katinka Hosszú	Hungary	2:04.22	
32	3	6	Petra Banović	Croatia	2:04.24	
33	2	2	Jana Myšková	Czech Republic	2:04.62	
34	2	4	Vesna Stojanovska	Macedonia	2:04.64	
35	1	3	Pilin Tachakittiranan	Thailand	2:05.29	
36	1	4	Yang Chin-kuei	Chinese Taipei	2:05.65	
37	2	3	Louise Mai Jansen	Denmark	2:06.06	
38	2	5	Larisa Lăcustă	Romania	2:06.62	
39	2	6	Sze Hang Yu	Hong Kong	2:07.55	
40	2	7	Khadija Ciss	Senegal	2:09.04	
41	1	5	Yuliya Rissik	Kazakhstan	2:09.93	

=== Semifinals ===
==== Semifinal 1 ====
Rank	Lane	Name	Nationality	Time	Notes
1	5	Federica Pellegrini	Italy	1:58.02	Q
2	1	Pang Jiaying	China	1:58.68	Q
3	3	Josefin Lillhage	Sweden	1:59.31	Q
4	4	Claudia Poll	Costa Rica	1:59.79	
5	7	Alena Popchanka	Belarus	1:59.87	
6	6	Lindsay Benko	United States	2:00.22	
7	8	Yang Yu	China	2:00.52	
8	2	Melanie Marshall	Great Britain	2:01.06	

==== Semifinal 2 ====
Rank	Lane	Name	Nationality	Time	Notes
1	3	Solenne Figuès	France	1:58.65	Q
2	4	Dana Vollmer	United States	1:59.04	Q
3	5	Paulina Barzycka	Poland	1:59.10	Q
4	2	Franziska van Almsick	Germany	1:59.13	Q
5	7	Camelia Potec	Romania	1:59.25	Q
6	6	Elka Graham	Australia	1:59.44	
7	8	Martina Moravcová	Slovakia	1:59.96	
8	1	Tomoko Nagai	Japan	2:00.09	

=== Final ===
Rank	Lane	Swimmer	Nation	Time	Notes
1st place, gold medalist(s)	1	Camelia Potec	Romania	1:58.03	
2nd place, silver medalist(s)	4	Federica Pellegrini	Italy	1:58.22	
3rd place, bronze medalist(s)	5	Solenne Figuès	France	1:58.45	
4	2	Paulina Barzycka	Poland	1:58.62	
5	7	Franziska van Almsick	Germany	1:58.88	
6	6	Dana Vollmer	United States	1:58.98	
7	3	Pang Jiaying	China	1:59.16	
8	8	Josefin Lillhage	Sweden	1:59.20	
