= Swimming at the 1997 European Aquatics Championships – Women's 800 metre freestyle =

This page shows the results of the Women's 800 metres Freestyle event at the European LC Championships 1997 which was held on Saturday 1997-08-23 in Seville, Spain.

== Finals ==
RANK	FINAL A	TIME
	Kerstin Kielgass (GER)	8:34.41
	Carla Geurts (NED)	8:36.14
	Jana Henke (GER)	8:39.93
4.	Kristýna Kyněrová (CZE)	8:45.74
5.	Flavia Rigamonti (SUI)	8:48.30
6.	Anna Simoni (ITA)	8:49.57
7.	Sarah Collings (GBR)	8:50.42
8.	Maria Bardina (ESP)	8:53.92

== See also ==
- 1996 Women's Olympic Games 800m Freestyle
- 1997 Women's World Championships (SC) 800m Freestyle
