= Albina Bordunova =

Ukrainian swimmer

Personal information
- Full name: Albina Mykolaivna Bordunova
- National team: Ukraine
- Born: 24 December 1984 (age 41) Zaporizhia, Ukrainian SSR, Soviet Union
- Height: 1.75 m (5 ft 9 in)
- Weight: 63 kg (139 lb)

Sport
- Sport: Swimming
- Strokes: Freestyle

Albina Mykolaivna Bordunova (Ukrainian: Альбіна Миколаівна Бордунова; born 24 December 1984) is a Ukrainian former swimmer, who specialized in middle-distance freestyle events. She competed for Ukraine, as a 15-year-old teen, in the women's 4×200 m freestyle relay at the 2000 Summer Olympics in Sydney. On the fifth day of prelims, Bordunova and her teammates Zhanna Lozumyrska, Nadiya Beshevli, and Olena Lapunova were disqualified from heat one for an early diving attempt on the lead-off leg.
