= Nadiya Beshevli =

Ukrainian swimmer (born 1982)

Personal information
- Full name: Nadiya Beshevli
- National team: Ukraine
- Born: 8 February 1982 (age 44) Donetsk, Ukrainian SSR, Soviet Union
- Height: 1.68 m (5 ft 6 in)
- Weight: 59 kg (130 lb)

Sport
- Sport: Swimming
- Strokes: Freestyle, backstroke
- Club: Dynamo Donetsk

Nadiya Beshevli (Ukrainian: Надія Бешевлі; born 8 February 1982) is a Ukrainian former swimmer, who specialized in freestyle and backstroke events. She represented Ukraine, as an 18-year-old, at the 2000 Summer Olympics, and held numerous Ukrainian titles and meet records in the freestyle relays and backstroke double (both 100 and 200 m).

Beshevli competed in five swimming events, including all relays, at the 2000 Summer Olympics in Sydney. She achieved FINA B-standards of 1:04.47 (100 m backstroke) and 2:17.48 (200 m backstroke) from the Multinations Swim Meet in Prague, Czech Republic. On the second day of the Games, Beshevli placed twenty-seventh in the 100 m backstroke. Swimming in heat three, she faded down the stretch on the final lap to share a fourth seed with Belgium's Sofie Wolfs in 1:04.66. Four days later, in the 200 m backstroke, Beshevli posted a sterling time of 2:15.86 to an unexpected triumph from heat two, but missed the semifinals by more than three-fourths of a second (0.75). A member of the Ukrainian squad, Beshevli also placed thirteenth in the 4×100 m freestyle relay (3:49.11), and sixteenth in the 4×100 m medley relay (4:15.64). In the 4×200 m freestyle relay, Beshevli and her teammates Olena Lapunova, Albina Bordunova, and Zhanna Lozumyrska were disqualified from heat one in the prelims for an early launch on the lead-off leg.
