= Ian Pope =

Ian Pope (born 1962) is an Olympic Swimming Coach for Australia where he served on the 2000 and 2008 Olympic Teams. He was also selected as a coach for the Australian Swimming Team at 6 World Championships teams 2001 2003 2004 2005 2010 2012. He was Head Coach of the Melbourne Vicentre Swimming Club from 2001 to 2017. Ian Pope is one of the most successful swimming coaches in the World having coached swimmers to over 70 Medalist's at the 3 major Swimming events in the World: The Olympic Games, World Championships, and the Commonwealth Games. - Coached swimmers to 11 World Records. - ASCTA Australian Coach of the Year 2004 - Vicsport Coach of the year (for all sports) 2006, 2010 - ASCTA Victorian Coach of the Year 1998 1999 2000 2001 2003 2005 2006 2007 2008 2010

Some of his medalist swimmers from the Olympics and World Championships include Michael Klim, Matt Welsh, Grant Hackett, Brett Hawke, Giaan Rooney and Patrick Murphy.

He has been named Victorian Swimming Coach of the Year nine times and Australia's overall Coach of the Year in 2003 and 2004.

== Early career ==
Pope was a young swim instructor in Box Hill working for Surrey Park Swimming Club, in 1985 Pope was appointed the club's first professional Head Coach. At Surrey Park Pope took a young Matt Welsh to the World Championships in 1998 and the Sydney Olympics in 2000.

Following his success at Surrey Park, Pope moved to Vicentre Swimming Club in 2001 as Head Coach (with Matt Welsh) coaching numerous Olympic and World Champion athletes before returning to Surrey Park Swimming Club in 2017. Now, Pope is Head Coach at Melbourne Swimming Club.
