= Marella Mamoun =

Syrian swimmer

Personal information
- Full name: Marella Mamoun
- National team: Syria
- Born: 16 May 1982 (age 44) Aleppo, Syria
- Height: 1.72 m (5 ft 8 in)
- Weight: 63 kg (139 lb)

Sport
- Sport: Swimming
- Strokes: Freestyle

Marella Mamoun (Arabic: ماريلا مأمون; born 16 May 1982) is a Syrian former swimmer, who specialized in middle-distance freestyle events. Mamoun competed only in the women's 200 m freestyle at the 2000 Summer Olympics in Sydney. She received a ticket from FINA, under a Universality program, in an entry time of 2:16.17. She participated in heat one against two other swimmers Nisha Millet of India and Pamela Vásquez of Honduras. She rounded out a small field of swimmers to last place in a time of 2:18.78, trailing behind leader Millet by almost ten seconds. Mamoun failed to advance into the semifinals, as she placed thirty-ninth overall in the prelims.
