= Nicola Jackson =

British swimmer

Personal information
- Full name: Nicola Clare Jackson
- National team: Great Britain
- Born: 19 February 1984 (age 42) Northallerton, England
- Height: 1.75 m (5 ft 9 in)
- Weight: 52 kg (115 lb; 8.2 st)

Sport
- Sport: Swimming
- Strokes: Freestyle, butterfly
- Club: Derwentside ASC
Medal record
Women's swimming
Representing Great Britain
World Championships (LC)
Gold medal – first place	2001 Fukuoka	4×200 m freestyle
World Championships (SC)
Gold medal – first place	2000 Athens	4×200 m freestyle
Silver medal – second place	1999 Hong Kong	4×200 m freestyle
Bronze medal – third place	2000 Athens	50 m butterfly
European Championships (SC)
Bronze medal – third place	1999 Lisbon	50 m butterfly
Bronze medal – third place	1999 Lisbon	4×50 m freestyle
Bronze medal – third place	1999 Lisbon	4×50 m medley

Nicola Jackson (born 19 February 1984) is a British former competitive swimmer who won two world championships in relay events.

== Swimming career ==
In 1999, Jackson won a silver medal at the World Short Course Championships in the 4×200-metre freestyle relay. The next year, at the 2000 FINA World Swimming Championships (25 m), she won a bronze medal in the 50-metre butterfly, and a gold medal as part of Great Britain's world-record-breaking 4×200-metre freestyle relay team. Jackson swam in the 2000 Summer Olympics in Sydney, as a member of Great Britain's 4×200-metre freestyle relay team, which finished in sixth place. In 2001, she won her only international medal in a long course championship, in the 4×200-metre freestyle relay at the 2001 World Aquatics Championships.

At the ASA National British Championships she won the 50 metres butterfly title in 1999.

Jackson studied at Durham University (Collingwood College). She is the sister of British swimmer Joanne Jackson.

== See also ==
- World record progression 4 × 200 metres freestyle relay
