= Kirsten Thomson =

Australian swimmer

Kirsten Thomson OLY
Personal information
- National team: Australia
- Born: 27 September 1983 (age 43) Sydney, New South Wales
- Height: 1.79 m (5 ft 10 in)
- Weight: 63 kg (139 lb)

Sport
- Sport: Swimming
- Strokes: Freestyle
- Club: Sutherland Leisure Club Aquadot
Medal record
Women's swimming
Representing Australia
Olympic Games
Silver medal – second place	2000 Sydney	4×200 m freestyle
World Championships (LC)
Silver medal – second place	2003 Barcelona	4×200 m freestyle

Kirsten Thomson (born 27 September 1983) is an Australian middle-distance freestyle swimmer who won a silver medal in the 4×200-metre freestyle relay at the 2000 Summer Olympics.

Coming from Sydney, New South Wales, Thomson was still attending Kirrawee High School, when under the tutelage of Doug Frost at the Sutherland club alongside Ian Thorpe when she was selected as a member of Australia's 4×200-metre relay team for the Sydney Games. Combining with Susie O'Neill, Giaan Rooney and Petria Thomas, the Australians led for the first 650 metres before being worn down by the U.S. relay team.

Thomson left the Sutherland club in 2002 after long-time coach Frost was removed from the head coaching duties when Thorpe decide to switch to the coaching of Tracy Menzies, who was then one of Frost's assistants. In 2003 Thomson, swimming with the University of Sydney club returned to the international arena, competing at the 2003 FINA World Championships in Barcelona, Spain, where she collected a silver in the 4×200-metre freestyle relay, and failed to make the final of the individual event. She missed selection for the 2004 Summer Olympics.

In February 2005 Thomson appeared in Series 10, episode 2 of Australian Story.

== See also ==
- List of Olympic medalists in swimming (women)
