= Zhanna Lozumyrska =

Ukrainian swimmer

Personal information
- Full name: Zhanna Yevhenivna Lozumyrska
- National team: Ukraine
- Born: 25 January 1981 (age 45) Kiev, Ukrainian SSR, Soviet Union
- Height: 1.67 m (5 ft 6 in)
- Weight: 58 kg (128 lb)

Sport
- Sport: Swimming
- Strokes: Freestyle, butterfly

Zhanna Yevhenivna Lozumyrska (Ukrainian: Жанна Євгенівна Лозумирська; born 25 January 1981) is a Ukrainian former swimmer, who specialized in middle-distance freestyle and butterfly events. Lozumyrska competed for Ukraine in two swimming events at the 2000 Summer Olympics in Sydney. She achieved a FINA B-cut of 2:14.14 (200 m butterfly) from the European Championships in Helsinki, Finland. On the fourth day of the Games, Lozumyrska placed twenty-fourth in the 200 m butterfly. Swimming in heat two, she faded down the stretch from third at the halfway turn to pick up a fourth seed in 2:14.47, about a third of a second (0.33) outside her entry standard. The following day, in the 4×200 m freestyle relay, Lozumyrska and her teammates Olena Lapunova, Nadiya Beshevli, and Albina Bordunova were disqualified from heat one in the prelims for an early launch on the lead-off leg.
