= Gulager =

Gulager is a surname. Notable people with this surname include:

- Clu Gulager (1928–2022), American television and film actor and director
- John Gulager (born 1957), American actor, cinematographer, and film director
- Miriam Gulager or Miriam Byrd-Nethery (1929–2003), American actress
