= Ditte Jensen =

Danish swimmer (born 1980)

Personal information
- Born: 25 October 1980 (age 45)
Medal record
Women's swimming
Representing Denmark
European Championships (LC)
Bronze medal – third place	1997 Seville	4×200 m freestyle

Ditte Christiane Jensen (born 25 October 1980 in Birkerød, Hovedstaden) is a former freestyle swimmer from Denmark, who represented her country at the 1996 Summer Olympics in Atlanta, Georgia.

A member of swimming club Idrætsforeningen Skjold she is best known for winning the bronze medal at the 1997 European Championships (LC) in the women's 4×200 m freestyle, alongside Britt Raaby, Berit Puggaard, and Mette Jacobsen. She was the youngest member (15 years, 271 days) of the Danish delegation at the 1996 Summer Olympics.
