= Pamela Vásquez =

Honduran swimmer (born 1981)

Personal information
- Born: March 10, 1981 (age 45)

Sport
- Sport: Swimming

Pamela Vásquez (born 10 March 1981) is a Honduran former swimmer. Vásquez enrolled in Washington College as an international student and competed in their swim team. While she was in college, she qualified to represent Honduras at the 2000 Summer Olympics in the women's 200 metre freestyle.

As part of her college swim team, she won 20 medals at different editions of the Centennial Conference Championships. In 2001, she qualified for the NCAA Division III Championships and earned All-America honorable mentions. Due to her service in sport, she was awarded the Senior Athletic Award in 2003 by the college and inducted to its Athletics Hall of Fame in 2015.

== Biography ==
Pamela Vásquez was born on 10 March 1981 in Honduras. She began swimming at the age of six, swimming in a river near her parents' farm. She later started training and competed in competitions located in Central America.

Vásquez enrolled in Washington College as an international student in 1999 and joined the swim team coached by Kim Lessard. During the 1999–2000 season, she was named the Most Outstanding Performer at the 2000 Centennial Conference Championships after she had won seven medals which included three gold medals. At the end of the season, she qualified to represent Honduras at the 2000 Summer Olympics held in Sydney, Australia. There, she was entered in one event, the women's 200 metre freestyle. She competed in the first heat on 18 September 2000 against two other swimmers and recorded a time of 2:15.83, placing second and failing to advance further.

During the winter season, she won six medals at the 2001 Centennial Conference Championships, which included four gold medals. Due to her performance, she qualified for the NCAA Division III Championships and earned All-America honorable mentions after placing 14th in two events. During her junior and senior years, she went on to win seven more medals at the Conference Championships. With a total of 20 medals, she was awarded the Senior Athletic Award in 2003 by Washington College. She was named to the college's sports' hall of fame in 2015.

Vásquez shortly retired from swimming after college. She worked in the college's international office, lifeguarded and taught swimming. Upon graduating, she returned to Honduras and worked in trade management. She also had a child with her partner.
