= Samantha Arsenault =

American swimmer (born 1981)

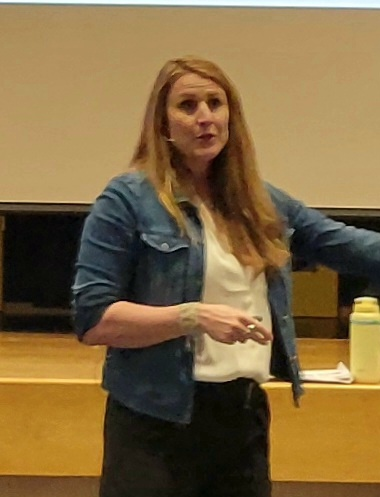
- Livingstone in 2024.

Personal information
- Full name: Samantha Arsenault
- Nickname: "Sam"
- National team: United States
- Born: October 11, 1981 (age 45) Peabody, Massachusetts, U.S.
- Height: 5 ft 10 in (1.78 m)
- Weight: 152 lb (69 kg)
- Spouse: Rob Livingstone

Sport
- Sport: Swimming
- Strokes: Freestyle
- Club: North Shore Swim Club; Greenwood Memorial (GMSC); Athens Bulldogs
- College team: University of Michigan; University of Georgia '05
- Coach: Don Lemieux (Greenwood Mem. SC); Jon Urbanchek (U. Michigan); Jack Bauerle (U. Georgia)
Medal record
Women's swimming
Representing the United States
Olympic Games
Gold medal – first place	2000 Sydney	4×200 m freestyle

Samantha Arsenault (born October 11, 1981), later known by her married name Samantha Livingstone, is an American former competition swimmer for the University of Georgia and a 2000 Sydney Olympic champion in the 4×200 meter freestyle relay where she helped set a new Olympic record. She would later teach high school science, coach swimming, and found Livingstone High Performance and the Whole Athlete Initiative (WAI) in 2016 to address mental health and organizational performance for youth.

== Early life and swimming ==
Samantha Arsenault was born in Peabody, Massachusetts on October 11, 1981, the second of four siblings to Jeanne and Edward Arsenault, who owned an auto-body shop. She began swimming at the age of 8 at the Beverly YMCA, only five miles from her home, as the Peabody YMCA lacked an indoor pool, required for her year round training.

=== Peabody High school ===
She attended Peabody High School where she was coached by Ken Leawood as a Freshman and Sophomore, breaking the school record in the 100 breast with a 1:13.65 in January 1997, and excelling in distance freestyle and the medley relay. Samantha's older brother Chris swam four years for Peabody, set school records for the University of Massachusetts and would also qualify for the 2000 Olympic trials. In her Freshman and Sophomore High School years, she also trained with Lexington's North Shore Swim Club, around 20 miles from her home in Peabody. Representing Peabody High as a 16-year old Sophomore at the Girls State Swimming Championships at Smith College in February 1997, Samantha placed second in the 100 butterfly with a time of 58.47.

=== Gardner high, Greenwood Memorial club ===
She made the decision to transfer to Gardner High School for her Junior year so she could be close to the more elite and competitive program at Greenwood Memorial Swim Club, then at 74 Edgell Street, in Gardner. The Greenwood team was assistant coached by Pete Salvan and Head coached by Pete Lemiex. Exhibiting dedication to the training demands of his daughter's elite sport, Arsenault's father Edward would drive 67 miles from Peabody to Gardner High School morning varsity practices where Samantha would attend School and afterwards train with the nearby evening practice at Greenwood Memorial Swim Club. After practice, a parent would return from Peabody, and pick Samantha up to repeat the 67 mile drive back home to Peabody where she would complete her homework. Arsenault later lived with a roommate in Gardiner to eliminate the commute.

Beginning to tire from the intensity of her sport by her Sophomore year, she found renewed inspiration swimming mornings in her Junior and Senior year with the swimming team at Gardiner High coached by Don Lemieux. Highly accomplished, Lemieux coached Gardiner High to fifteen consecutive state swimming championships from 1994 to 2008 and mentored sixteen swimmers who qualified for the Olympic trials at Greenwood Memorial.

Graduating Gardner in 1999, she helped lead the school to two consecutive Massachusetts State team championships in her Junior and Senior year, and also won numerous individual state championship titles.

=== High school highlights ===
At the U.S. Open in College Station on December, 1998, she placed second in the 200 freestyle with a time of 2:00.25.

She represented her school, Greenwood Memorial, at her last High School era state-wide championship swim meet at the Bowdoin Open in mid-December, 1999. She won the 400 IM in 4:23.48, the 500 free in a meet record time of 4:52.30, the 200-yard free in a meet record time of 1:48.33, the 100-yard backstroke in meet record time of 56.13, the 50-yard free in a meet record time of 23.48, the 100-yard free in the meet record time of 50.77, and the 200-yard IM in a meet record time of 2:03.97 At the competitive U.S. Championships in East Meadow, New York, she placed 7th in the 100-meter freestyle with a 57.31

In her senior year, Arsenault captured two state titles at the February 1999 Massachusetts Interscholastic Athletic Association (MIAA) State Championships in Springfield, winning the 200 freestyle title with a 1:49.79, and the 500 freestyle with a state record time of 4:52.08. She helped lead Gardner high to the state team championship that year, with a solid lead in points. She also swam in winning relays.

Samantha served with the U.S. National Team, and the U.S. Pan Pacific Team in 1999.

== 2000 Olympics ==
On August 12, 2000, as an 18-year old at the Olympic trials in Indianapolis, she finished third in the 200-meter freestyle finals with a time of 2:00.79, behind first-place finisher Lindsey Benko and second place Rada Owen. Carefully watching the trials, her Peabody High Coach Ken Leawood noted "There was no doubt in my mind the potential was there. The question is whether it would be realized". If she had placed first or second, she could have won one of the individual spots for the event, rather than a spot on the relay. Arsenault had recorded a faster time in her two preliminaries for the event. In the final, she was under world record time for the first 50 meters of the final but was passed in the final 50 meters by Benko and Owen. The Women's 2000 U.S. Olympic Head Coach was Stanford Coach Richard Quick, but her Michigan coach Jon Urbanchek also assisted with coaching.

At 18, Arsenault represented the United States at the 2000 Olympic Games in Sydney, Australia, where she received a gold medal as a member of the winning U.S. team in the women's 4×200-meter freestyle relay, together with teammates Diana Munz, Lindsay Benko and Jenny Thompson as anchor. In a tight race, the Australian women's team finished only .72 seconds after the American team to take the silver. The four Americans set a new Olympic record in the event final of 7:57.80. Samantha swam a 1:59.92 leading off the first 200-meter leg of the relay, though she would soon improve slightly on her time. All four of the American swimmers' 200-meter times were just under 2 minutes, and within a second of each other. The standing July, 1996 Olympic record, set by the United States was two seconds slower.

=== FINA World Cup ===
On November 18, 1999, Arsenault swam a 1:01.52 for the 100-meter backstroke taking a silver medal in the FINA World Cup at College Park, Maryland.

On December 2, 2000, Arsenault swam a 1:57.80 to win the event and take the gold medal in the 200-meter freestyle at the FINA World Cup in Paris, France, finishing a quarter length ahead of Solenne Figues of France.

== College swimming ==
After taking off a year to train for the Olympics and compete, Arsenault initially attended the University of Michigan, and swam for the Michigan Wolverines swimming and diving team where she trained with Hall of Fame Coach Jon Urbanchek. As a college Freshman at the February, 2001, Big Ten Championships at the Indiana University pool, Arsenault swam a 50.9 in the 100-yard freestyle, placing third. Her career was put on hold in 2001 as a result of surgery to improve flexibility and strength in her left shoulder.

She transferred to the University of Georgia after her freshman year, and finished her college sports career competing for coach Jack Bauerle's Georgia Bulldogs swimming and diving team from 2003 to 2005 where she majored in Sports Education. At the University of Georgia she was a 7 time NCAA All-American, and as a Co-captain, led the Georgia swim team to the 2005 National Championship title. Prior to the 2005 NCAA team championship, Georgia had placed second in team standings at the NCAA National Meet in three prior years. As a Junior and elite swimmer at Georgia in 2003, her practices could take up to 5 hours a day.

=== 2005 SEC, NCAA championship ===
In her final NCAA Championship in 2005 for Georgia in West Lafayette Indiana, she swam on the winning 400-meter medley relay team, and placed 6th in the 50-yard freestyle, helping Georgia take the team NCAA Championships. At the Mid-February Southeastern Conference mid-February (SEC) Swimming Championship in Gainesville, Florida, Arsenault swam on the winning 200-yard medley relay team with a school record time of 1:38.21, helping Georgia to take their second straight SEC Conference Championship.

On June 23, 2006, she married Rob Livingstone of Moncton, New Brunswick, Canada, in Peabody, Massachusetts. Livingstone attended Jacksonville College.

=== Later life ===
After college, Arsenault spent six years teaching science in high school from around 2005-2011 and coaching swimming for Gwinnett County Summer programs and Swim Atlanta. She worked in administrative positions for Gwinnett County School through 2011. She founded Livingstone High Performance and the Whole Athlete Initiative (the WAI) in 2016 to improve mental health and organizational performance, including sports performance, for youth. She served with USA Swimming from 2017 to 2020 in coaching and with their mental health task force. Her educational background includes a bachelor's and master's degree in science education from the University of Georgia and an instructor certification in Mental Health First Aid. She was certified as a facilitator of Mindful Sports Performance Enhancement and is also certified in STARR (Stress + Trauma Activate, Release + Rewire). In 2024, she was continuing to serve with Livingstone.

Samantha lives in the Williamstown area of Berkshire County, Massachusetts with her four daughters and husband Rob. In 2014, as a specialist in Olympic site selection, Rob Livingstone ran Games-Bids.com, a website that tracks Olympic bids. He worked as a Strength and Conditioning Coach at Williams College in Williamstown, Massachusetts and operated his business, Livingstone Speed Academy.

=== Honors ===
She was the 2005 NCAA Georgia Woman of the Year and received the 2005 NCAA Top VIII Award in 2005 for student-athletes for their success in sports, academics, and the community. She received the Joel Eves award at the University of Georgia for obtaining the highest GPA for all the athletes in her graduating class, and was voted to the CoSIDA Academic All-America 1st Team. In 2005 she was nominated for the H. Boyd McWhorter Scholar Athlete Post-Graduate Scholarship Award, which may have assisted her in obtaining her master's degree in Science Education. She was inducted into the Greenfield, Massachusett's Bay State Games Hall of Fame in May, 2018 for her lifetime sports achievements as a participant in their annual sporting event.

== See also ==
- List of Olympic medalists in swimming (women)
- List of University of Georgia people
