= Rada Owen =

American swimmer (born 1978)

Personal information
- Full name: Rada Ellen Owen
- National team: United States
- Born: October 12, 1978 (age 47) Richmond, Virginia, U.S.
- Height: 5 ft 11 in (1.80 m)
- Weight: 154 lb (70 kg)

Sport
- Sport: Swimming
- Strokes: Freestyle
- College team: Auburn University

Rada Ellen Owen (born October 12, 1978) is an American swimming coach and former competition swimmer. Owen competed in the 2000 Summer Olympics.

== Biography ==
Rada Owen was born and raised in Richmond, Virginia and began her swimming career at the age of 5. She swam for Poseidon Swimming in high school under esteemed coach Dudley Duncan, who also taught fellow Olympian Whitney Hedgepeth. After graduating from Manchester High School, Owen went to Auburn University, where she was a member of one of the top swim programs in the country. While there she held numerous team records, was a six-time Southeastern Conference champion, a fourteen-time All-American, and was key in developing a national championship-winning team.

She competed for the United States in various international competitions, including the 2000 Olympic Games in Sydney, Australia.

Her technique is the basis for the swim clinics she has run around the world. She lends her stroke demonstration to the "Swimming Faster Freestyle" DVD series and has been the focus of magazines articles depicting her form. She retired from competition in 2003, and now competes at Master's meets, usually only once a year and only in the relay events.

Owen appeared in a McDonald's commercial for the 2008 Summer Olympics.

The Virginia Senate and House of Delegates passed a joint resolution commending Owen in 2001.

== See also ==
- List of Auburn University people
- List of Olympic medalists in swimming (women)
