= Guldager =

Guldager is a surname. Notable people with the surname include:

- Bjarne Guldager (1897–1971), Norwegian sprinter
- Holger Guldager (1904–1986), Danish cyclist
- Katrine Marie Guldager (born 1966), Danish autobiographer

== See also ==
- Gulager
