= Irina Ufimtseva =

Russian swimmer

Personal information
- Full name: Ирина Уфимцева
- Nationality: Russia
- Born: 6 January 1985 (age 41) Novosibirsk, RSFSR, USSR, now Russia
- Height: 1.68 m (5 ft 6 in)
- Weight: 50 kg (110 lb)

Sport
- Sport: Swimming
- Strokes: Freestyle
Medal record
Summer Universiade
Bronze medal – third place	2003 Daegu	4×200 m freestyle
World championships (SC)
Silver medal – second place	2002 Moscow	800 m freestyle
European championships (SC)
Gold medal – first place	2000 Valencia	400 m freestyle
Bronze medal – third place	2001 Antwerp	400 m freestyle
Bronze medal – third place	2001 Antwerp	800 m freestyle

Irina Ufimtseva (Russian: Ирина Уфимцева; born 6 January 1985) is a former Olympics freestyle swimmer from Russia. She swam for Russia at the 2000 Olympics where she was part of Russia's tenth place women's 4×200 m freestyle relay. Individually she finished in 17th place in the 400 m and 800 m freestyle.

She had her best results in the 400 m and 800 m freestyle in the 25 m pool: a silver medal at the 2002 World Championships and three medals at European championships in 2000-2001.
