= Kim Black =

American swimmer (born 1978)

Kimberly Black
Personal information
- Full name: Kimberly Black
- Nickname: "Kim"
- National team: United States
- Born: April 30, 1978 (age 48) Liverpool, New York, U.S.
- Height: 5 ft 6 in (1.68 m)
- Weight: 132 lb (60 kg)

Sport
- Sport: Swimming
- Strokes: Freestyle
- College team: University of Georgia
Medal record
Women's swimming
Representing the United States
Summer Olympics
Gold medal – first place	2000 Sydney	4x200 m freestyle
Summer Universiade
Gold medal – first place	1997 Catania	4x200 m freestyle
Gold medal – first place	1999 Palma	200 m freestyle
Gold medal – first place	1999 Palma	4x100 m freestyle
Gold medal – first place	2001 Beijing	4x200 m freestyle
Silver medal – second place	1997 Messina	200 m freestyle

Kimberly "Kim" Black (born April 30, 1978) is an American former competition swimmer and Olympic gold medalist.

Black began her college swimming career at The Ohio State University, before transferring to the University of Georgia in 1999. She graduated from UGA in 2001 and was named the NCAA Woman of the Year Award for 2001. She is also recipient of an NCAA Post-Graduate scholarship in 2001. She was on the U.S. Women's swimming team in the 2000 Summer Olympics where she won a gold medal in the 800 meter freestyle relay. During her swimming career at Georgia, she was a four – time All-American and helped lead the Lady Bulldogs to three straight NCAA championships. Black was also awarded the Today's Top VIII Award as a member of the Class of 2002. She was the female winner of the National Collegiate Athletic Association's highest academic honor, the 2001 Walter Byers Award, in recognition of being the nation's top female scholar-athlete.

She was in the 2002 Top VIII class with Emily Bloss, André Davis, Misty Hyman, Leah Juno, Nancy Metcalf, Bryce Molder, and Ruth Riley. The 2001 Male Walter Byers Scholar was Bradley Henderson.

== See also ==
- List of Olympic medalists in swimming (women)
- List of University of Georgia people

Preceded by Kristy Kowal	NCAA Woman of the Year Award; 2001	Succeeded by Tanisha Silas
