= Sara Harstick =

German swimmer (born 1981)

Personal information
- Full name: Sara Harstick
- Nationality: German
- Born: 8 September 1981 (age 45) Hildesheim, Niedersachsen, West Germany
- Height: 1.78 m (5 ft 10 in)
- Weight: 66 kg (146 lb)

Sport
- Sport: Swimming
- Strokes: Freestyle
Medal record
Women's swimming
Representing Germany
Olympic Games
Bronze medal – third place	2000 Sydney	4×200 m freestyle
Bronze medal – third place	2004 Athens	4×200 m freestyle
World Championships (LC)
Silver medal – second place	2001 Fukuoka	4×200 m freestyle

Sara Harstick (born 8 September 1981 in Hildesheim, Niedersachsen) is a former German freestyle swimmer, who won bronze medals in the 2000 and 2004 Summer Olympics.

Also in 2004 in Athens, she swam in her only individual Olympic race, finishing sixth in the fifth heat of the 200 m freestyle, one spot short of advancing to the semifinals. A few months before the 2008 Summer Olympics, Harstick ended her swimming career after the firing of her coach, Rainer Tylinski.
