= Laëtitia Choux =

French swimmer

Personal information
- Born: September 23, 1979 (age 47) Épinal, France
- Height: 170 cm (5 ft 7 in)
- Weight: 55 kg (121 lb)

Sport
- Sport: Swimming
Medal record
Representing France
European Championships
Bronze medal – third place	2000 Helsinki	4x200m freestyle relay

Laëtitia Choux (born 23 September 1979) is a French former swimmer who competed in the 1996 Summer Olympics and in the 2000 Summer Olympics.
