= Britt Raaby =

Danish swimmer

Personal information
- Born: 20 January 1978 (age 48) Guldager, Esbjerg, Denmark
Medal record
Women's swimming
Representing Denmark
European Championships (LC)
Bronze medal – third place	1997 Seville	4×200 m freestyle

Britt Biltoft Raaby (born 20 January 1978 in Guldager, Esbjerg) is a former freestyle swimmer from Denmark, who represented her native country at the 1996 Summer Olympics in Atlanta, Georgia.

A member of swimming club Hjerting Idrætsforening she is best known for winning the bronze medal at the 1997 European Championships (LC) in the women's 4×200 m freestyle, alongside Ditte Jensen, Berit Puggaard, and Mette Jacobsen.
