= Adi Bichman =

Israeli swimmer (born 1983)

Adi Maia Bichman
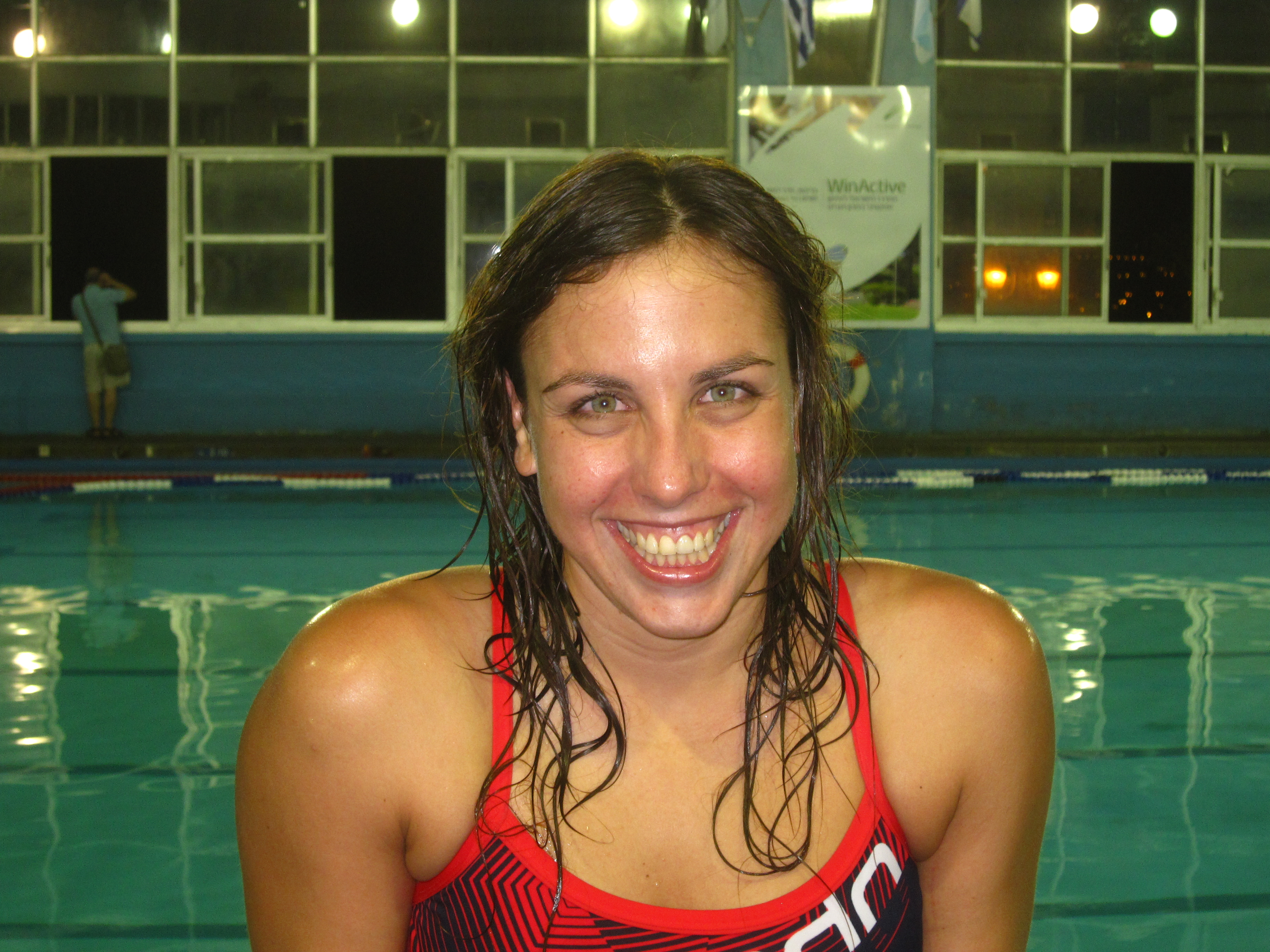

Personal information
- Native name: עדי מאיה ביכמן
- National team: Israel
- Born: 5 February 1983 (age 43)
- Height: 165 cm (5 ft 5 in)
- Weight: 60 kg (132 lb)

Sport
- Sport: Swimming
- Events: 400 Meter free, 800 Meter free 400 Meter medley
- Strokes: Freestyle, Medley
- College team: Rice University

Adi Maia Bichman (Hebrew: עדי מאיה ביכמן; born February 5, 1983) is an Israeli former swimmer who swam in the 2000 Olympics.

She attended Rice University on an athletic scholarship. She is the director of the Faculty of Health Professions at the Ono Academic College.

== 2000 Sydney Olympics ==
She participated in the 2000 Summer Olympics in Sydney, where she swam in the 400m and 800m freestyle, as well as the 400m medley.

=== 2000 Olympic times ===
She swam in Heat 1 of the 400 meter freestyle at the Sydney Olympics and placed seventh with a time of 4:27.33, not finishing in the top eight times to qualify for the final heat. In the 400 meter Individual Medley, she placed eighth, in Heat 3, with a time of 5:06.72. In the 800 meter freestyle, she came in twenty-fifth overall with a time of 9:01.90.

=== International competition highlights ===
In International competition many of her personal bests were in the following events:

- In the FINA World Championships in Greece in March, 2000; She swam the 50, 100, 200, and 400 meter freestyle. In the 400, she swam a 4:19.19.
- IN the FINA Swimming World Cup in France in December, 2000; She swam the 800 freestyle and the 400 medley. In the 800, she swam an 8:42.38, and in the 400 she swam a 4:51.73.
- In the Israel Swimming Cup in January 1999 in January 1999; She swam the 1500 freestyle in 17:10.29. At only 15, it was a personal best.
- In the European Championships in Finland in May–June 2000; She swam the 50, 200, 400 and 800 Meter freestyle, the 50 and 100 Butterfly, and the 400 Medley relay. In the 400 Meter freestyle, one of her signature events, she swam a 4:23.72, and in the 800 Meter freestyle, she swam a 8:47.98.

In January 2002, Rice won all ten events of a meet consisting entirely of relays, taking its third title at the University of San Diego Invitational at the San Diego Sports Center. Rice had swimmers that placed 1–2 in four separate events and accumulated 204 points to finish ahead of Arkansas (100), Air Force (76) and San Diego (58). The relay team of Jackie Corcoran, Bichman, and Corrie Kristick completed the 1500 yard freestyle relay in 15:34.86, over 17 seconds in front of Arkansas which took second.

== See also ==
- List of select Jewish swimmers
- List of Israeli records in swimming
