= Alicia Bozon =

French swimmer

Personal information
- National team: France
- Born: June 1, 1984 (age 42)

Sport
- Sport: Swimming
Medal record
Representing France
Mediterranean Games
Silver medal – second place	2001 Tunis	200m freestyle
European Championships
Bronze medal – third place	2000 Helsinki	4x200m freestyle relay

Alicia Bozon (born 1 June 1984) is a French former freestyle swimmer who competed in the 2000 Summer Olympics.
