= Angels Bardina =

Spanish swimmer

Personal information
- Born: 3 June 1980 (age 46) L'Hospitalet de Llobregat, Spain

Sport
- Sport: Swimming
Medal record
Representing Spain
Mediterranean Games
Silver medal – second place	1997 Bari	800m freestyle
European Junior Championships
Bronze medal – third place	1995 Geneva	200m freestyle

María Àngels Bardina Vidal (born 3 June 1980) is a Spanish former swimmer who competed in the 2000 Summer Olympics.
