= Wang Luna =

Chinese swimmer

Personal information
- Born: August 7, 1980 (age 45)

Sport
- Sport: Swimming

Wang Luna (born 7 August 1980) is a Chinese former swimmer who competed in the 1996 Summer Olympics and in the 2000 Summer Olympics.

She was tested positive for triamterene at the 1998 World Aquatics Championships and subsequently banned from competition for two years.
