= Solenne Figuès =

French swimmer

Personal information
- Nationality: France
- Born: 6 June 1979 (age 47) Villepinte, France
- Height: 1.78 m (5 ft 10 in)

Sport
- Sport: Swimming
- Strokes: Greestyle
Medal record
Women's swimming
Representing France
Olympic Games
Bronze medal – third place	2004 Athens	200 m freestyle
World Championships (LC)
Gold medal – first place	2005 Montreal	200 m freestyle
European Championships (LC)
Gold medal – first place	2004 Madrid	4×100 m freestyle
Silver medal – second place	2004 Madrid	200 m freestyle
Silver medal – second place	2004 Madrid	4×200 m freestyle
Bronze medal – third place	2000 Helsinki	4×200 m freestyle
European Championships (SC)
Silver medal – second place	2001 Antwerp	200 m freestyle
Silver medal – second place	2002 Riesa	200 m freestyle
Summer Universiade
Gold medal – first place	2003 Daegu	4×100 m freestyle
Mediterranean Games
Gold medal – first place	1997 Bari	200 m freestyle
Gold medal – first place	2005 Almería	200 m freestyle
Gold medal – first place	2005 Almería	4×200 m freestyle
Silver medal – second place	2005 Almería	100 m freestyle

Solenne Figuès (born 6 June 1979 in Villepinte) is a retired French swimmer.

Figuès represented France in the 1996 Atlanta Olympics, the 2000 Sydney Olympics, and the 2004 Athens Olympics. She won her first medal, a bronze, in 2000, in the 2000 European Swimming Championship in the 4×200 m freestyle relays. This was followed by a bronze swimming in the 2004 Athens Olympics and, in the 2005 FINA Swimming World Cup in Montreal, a gold in the 200 m freestyle.

She also studies physical therapy, which she practices in Toulouse.
