= Petra Banović =

Croatian swimmer (born 1979)

Personal information
- Born: November 10, 1979 (age 46) Zagreb, Yugoslavia

Sport
- Sport: Swimming

Petra Banović (born November 10, 1979, in Zagreb) is a freestyle and medley swimmer from Croatia, who competed in two consecutive Summer Olympics for her native country, starting in Sydney 2000. She graduated from Arizona State University in 2004 as an honor student. Petra is married to Julio Santos, a three-time Olympian from Ecuador.
