= Kirsten Vlieghuis =

Dutch swimmer

Personal information
- Full name: Kirsten Vlieghuis
- Nationality: Netherlands
- Born: 17 May 1976 (age 50) Hengelo, Overijssel, Netherlands

Sport
- Sport: Swimming
- Strokes: Freestyle
Medal record
Women's swimming
Representing Netherlands
Olympic Games
| Bronze medal – third place | 1996 Atlanta | 400 m freestyle |
| Bronze medal – third place | 1996 Atlanta | 800 m freestyle |
World Championships (LC)
| Bronze medal – third place | 1998 Perth | 800 m freestyle |
European Championships (LC)
| Silver medal – second place | 1995 Vienna | 4×200 m freestyle |
| Silver medal – second place | 1999 Istanbul | 800 m freestyle |
| Bronze medal – third place | 2000 Helsinki | 800 m freestyle |

Kirsten Vlieghuis (born 17 May 1976 in Hengelo, Overijssel) is a former freestyle swimmer from The Netherlands, who won two bronze medals at the 1996 Summer Olympics in Atlanta, United States, in the 400m and 800m freestyle competition. She also competed in the 2000 Summer Olympics.

Vlieghuis won the 1991 European Junior Swimming Championships in the 400m and 800m freestyle, and won a bronze medal in the 800m freestyle at the 1998 World Aquatics Championships in Perth, Australia. She won the 800m freestyle event in the 1998 Goodwill Games. She retired from competitive swimming in 2001.
