= Vicky Horner =

British swimmer

Personal information
- Full name: Victoria Elizabeth Horner
- Nickname: "Vicky"
- National team: Great Britain
- Born: 11 May 1976 (age 50) Newcastle upon Tyne, England
- Height: 1.70 m (5 ft 7 in)
- Weight: 67 kg (148 lb; 10.6 st)

Sport
- Sport: Swimming
- Strokes: Freestyle
- Club: Derwentside ASC
Medal record
Women's swimming
Representing Great Britain
European Championships (SC)
Silver medal – second place	1998 Sheffield	400 m freestyle
European Championships (LC)
Bronze medal – third place	1995 Vienna	4×200 m freestyle
Representing England
Commonwealth Games
Silver medal – second place	1998 Kuala Lumpur	400m freestyle

Victoria Elizabeth Horner (born 11 May 1976) is a female English former competitive swimmer.

== Swimming career ==
She represented Great Britain in the Olympic Games and European championships. She won a bronze medal in the 4×200-metre freestyle relay at the 1995 European Aquatics Championships. Her team finished 10th in the same event at the 1996 Summer Olympics. She also won a silver medal in the 400-metre freestyle at the European Short Course Swimming Championships 1998. She represented England at the 1994 Commonwealth Games in Victoria, British Columbia, Canada and won a silver medal at the 1998 Commonwealth Games in Kuala Lumpur, Malaysia, in the 400-metre freestyle.

She is a three-times winner of the British Championship in 400-metre freestyle (1997, 1998 and 2000).

== Personal life ==
Her husband, Rob Hayles, is a retired Olympic sprint cyclist. They have a daughter, born 23 January 2006.
