= Giaan Rooney =

Australian swimmer and television personality

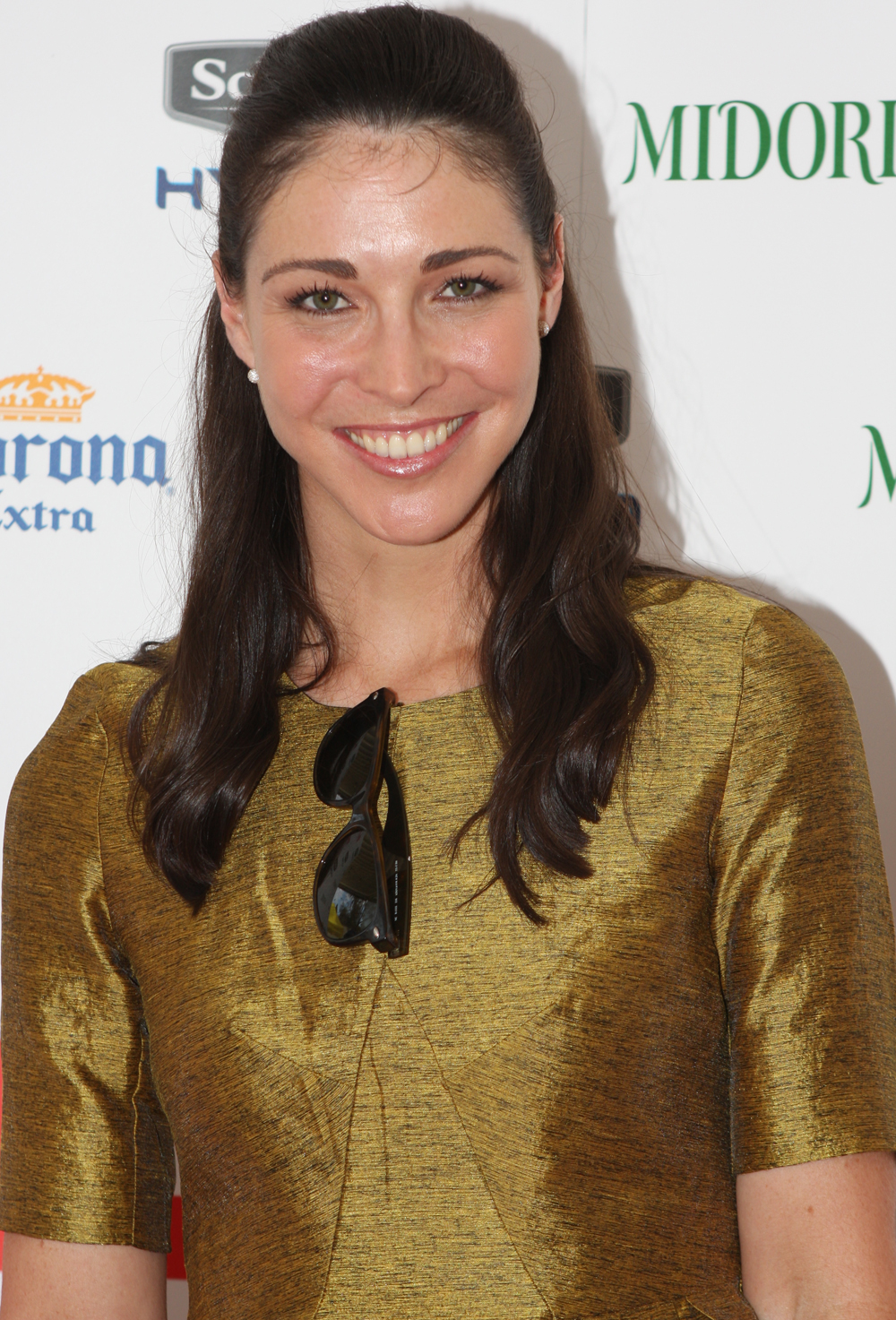
- Rooney in November 2012

Personal information
- Full name: Giaan Leigh Rooney
- National team: Australian
- Born: 15 November 1982 (age 44) Brisbane, Queensland
- Height: 1.75 m (5 ft 9 in)
- Weight: 63 kg (139 lb)
- Spouse: Sam Levett (m. 2010)

Sport
- Sport: Swimming
- Strokes: Freestyle
- Club: Melbourne Vicentre; Australian Institute of Sport
Medal record
Women's swimming
Representing Australia
Olympic Games
Gold medal – first place	2004 Athens	4×100 m medley
Silver medal – second place	2000 Sydney	4×100 m medley
Silver medal – second place	2000 Sydney	4×200 m freestyle
World Championships (LC)
Gold medal – first place	2001 Fukuoka	200 m freestyle
Gold medal – first place	2005 Montreal	50 m backstroke
Gold medal – first place	2005 Montreal	4×100 m medley
Silver medal – second place	2003 Barcelona	4×200 m freestyle
Bronze medal – third place	2003 Barcelona	4×100 m medley
World Championships – Short Course
Silver medal – second place	1999 Hong Kong	4×100 m medley
Silver medal – second place	2002 Moscow	4×100 m freestyle
Bronze medal – third place	1999 Hong Kong	4×200 m freestyle
Bronze medal – third place	2002 Moscow	4×200 m freestyle
Pan Pacific Championships
Silver medal – second place	1999 Sydney	4×200 m freestyle
Silver medal – second place	2002 Yokohama	4×200 m freestyle
Bronze medal – third place	2002 Yokohama	200 m freestyle
Commonwealth Games
Gold medal – first place	1998 Kuala Lumpur	100 m backstroke
Gold medal – first place	1998 Kuala Lumpur	4×100 m medley
Silver medal – second place	2002 Manchester	4×200 m freestyle
Silver medal – second place	2006 Melbourne	50 m backstroke
Silver medal – second place	2006 Melbourne	100 m backstroke
Bronze medal – third place	2002 Manchester	100 m backstroke

Giaan Leigh Rooney, OAM (born 15 November 1982) is an Australian former competitive swimmer and television presenter. As a member of the Australian team in women's 4×100-metre medley relay, she won an Olympic gold medal and broke a world record at the 2004 Summer Olympics. Rooney is currently an Australian television presenter.

== Personal life ==
Rooney was born in Brisbane and moved to the Gold Coast at age 8 where she attended Miami State Primary School and All Saints Anglican School.

Giaan is married to Sam Levett. On 17 March 2014, Rooney gave birth to her first child, a boy, and on 14 June 2017 a girl.

== Swimming career ==
Rooney's career began at age 11 at the Miami club in Queensland, where she was coached by Denis Cotterell. Training partners there included Grant Hackett and Daniel Kowalski. In 2002 Rooney moved to Melbourne, coached by Ian Pope at the Melbourne Sports and Aquatic Centre. Training partners included Matt Welsh, Michael Klim (who was also her boyfriend for two years) and Brett Hawke.

Rooney made her international swimming debut for Australia at the 1998 Commonwealth Games, where she won a gold medal in the 100 m backstroke as a 15-year-old. Rooney was also part of Australia's gold medal-winning 4×100-metre medley relay team at the 1998 Games.

At the 2000 Olympics in Sydney Rooney won two silver medals as a part of the 4×200-metre freestyle relay (with Kirsten Thomson, Susie O'Neill and Petria Thomas) and 4×100-metre medley relay (swam in morning preliminary session).

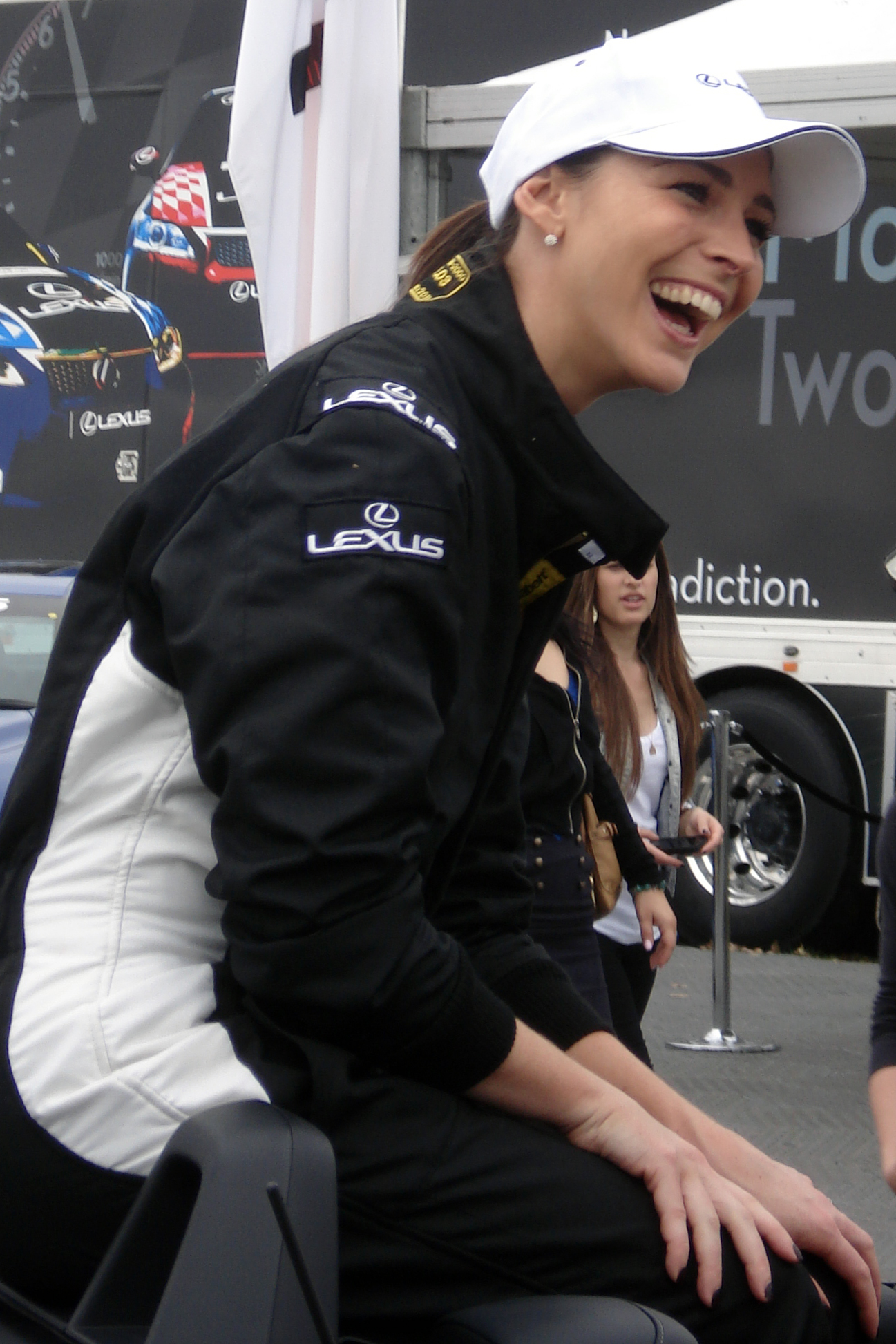
Rooney at the 2011 Australian Grand Prix

In 2001 Rooney claimed the world champion title in the 200 m freestyle, winning at the 2001 Fukuoka World Swimming Championships in Japan. This meet was also widely remembered for the disqualification of the Australian women's team after they jumped in the water to celebrate apparent victory in the 4×200-metre freestyle relay: the team of Elka Graham, Petria Thomas and Linda Mackenzie joined anchor swimmer Rooney in the water to celebrate their win, but as it was before all other competitors had finished the event, they were disqualified. Furthermore, the team found out about their disqualification while they were giving a post race interview for television.

Rooney competed in the 2002 Commonwealth Games in Manchester, England, winning silver in the 4×200-metre freestyle relay (with Elka Graham, Rebecca Creedy and Petria Thomas) and bronze in the 100-metre backstroke.

In 2004 Rooney won a gold medal in world record time at the 2004 Summer Olympics in the women's 4×100-metre Medley Relay. Rooney swam a personal best and new Australian record time of 1:01.18 to help Australia to the gold – the maiden victory by Australia in this event in Olympic history.

After the withdrawal of Grant Hackett from the 2006 Commonwealth Games due to injury, Rooney was appointed as the captain of the national swimming team. She won a silver medal behind teammate Sophie Edington in the 100-metre backstroke, and qualified fastest for the 50-metre backstroke. However, she was upset by Edington by 0.01 of a second, again winning a silver medal. There is, however, conjecture about that official result with video suggesting Rooney touched first but did not activate the timing pad immediately. Rooney retired from competitive swimming after this meet.

== Television career ==
Rooney has performed on television with appearances on Torvill and Dean's Dancing on Ice competition and holiday season weather presenter on Nine Network's Today, filling in for Steven Jacobs, despite having no experience or qualification in meteorology.

Giaan also appeared as a presenter on the Nine Network's television health series What's Good For You (2007), Getaway (2007–08) and Battlefronts (2009). She also attended Bond University as a sporting scholar.

In 2010, Rooney was appointed as host of the Victorian edition of Postcards, a local travel series broadcast on the Nine Network replacing Suzie Wilks, and in 2011, Nine Network appointed her as occasional host of their Sunday sports program Nine's Wide World of Sports.

In December 2012, Rooney joined the Seven Network as a fill-in weather presenter on Seven News Melbourne while David Brown was on holidays, and in February 2013, she was appointed regular weather presenter on Seven News Melbourne replacing Brown who became network meteorologist. In January 2014, Rooney went on maternity leave, and was replaced by Jo Silvagni. She returned from maternity leave in June 2014 to present weather on weekends.

In February 2015, Rooney resigned as weekend weather presenter on Seven News Melbourne, and in October 2015 she became sports presenter for Seven News Brisbane. No longer in this role, she remains part of the Seven Network's news and sport division.

In April 2018, Rooney was part of the Seven Network's 2018 Commonwealth Games commentary team.

== See also ==
- List of Commonwealth Games records in swimming
- List of Olympic medalists in swimming (women)
- List of World Aquatics Championships medalists in swimming (women)
- List of Commonwealth Games medallists in swimming (women)
- World record progression 4 × 100 metres medley relay
