= Camelia Potec =

Romanian swimmer

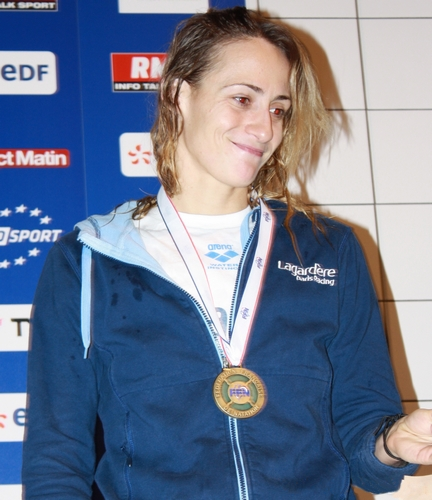

Personal information
- Full name: Camelia Alina Potec
- Nationality: Romania
- Born: 19 February 1982 (age 44) Brăila, Romania
- Height: 1.78 m (5 ft 10 in)
- Weight: 64 kg (141 lb)

Sport
- Sport: Swimming
- Strokes: Freestyle
- Club: CSA Steaua București
Medal record
Women's swimming
Representing Romania
Olympic Games
Gold medal – first place	2004 Athens	200 m freestyle
World Championships (LC)
Bronze medal – third place	2001 Fukuoka	200 m freestyle
Bronze medal – third place	2009 Rome	1500 m freestyle
World Championships (SC)
Silver medal – second place	2008 Manchester	400 m freestyle
European Championships (LC)
Gold medal – first place	1999 Istanbul	200 m freestyle
Gold medal – first place	1999 Istanbul	400 m freestyle
Gold medal – first place	2000 Helsinki	4 × 200 m freestyle
Gold medal – first place	2004 Madrid	200 m freestyle
Silver medal – second place	2002 Berlin	200 m freestyle
Silver medal – second place	2004 Madrid	400 m freestyle
Silver medal – second place	2008 Eindhoven	200 m freestyle
Bronze medal – third place	1997 Seville	200 m freestyle
Bronze medal – third place	1999 Istanbul	4 × 200 m freestyle
Bronze medal – third place	2000 Helsinki	200 m freestyle
Bronze medal – third place	2000 Helsinki	400 m freestyle
Bronze medal – third place	2000 Helsinki	4 × 100 m medley
Bronze medal – third place	2002 Berlin	400 m freestyle
Bronze medal – third place	2004 Madrid	800 m freestyle
Bronze medal – third place	2004 Madrid	4 × 200 m freestyle
Bronze medal – third place	2008 Eindhoven	800 m freestyle
Bronze medal – third place	2008 Eindhoven	400 m freestyle
Universiade
Gold medal – first place	2001 Beijing	200 m freestyle
Gold medal – first place	2001 Beijing	400 m freestyle
Gold medal – first place	2005 İzmir	400 m freestyle
Bronze medal – third place	2005 İzmir	800 m freestyle

Camelia Potec (Romanian pronunciation: [kaˈmeli.a ˈpotek]; born 19 February 1982, in Brăila) is a female Romanian swimmer, who won the gold medal in the women's 200 m freestyle at the 2004 Summer Olympics.

She won the Mare Nostrum in 2004.

Sporting positions
Preceded by (Slovakia) Martina Moravcová	Mare Nostrum Tour Overall Winner; 2004	Succeeded by (Hungary) László Cseh
