= Kristýna Kyněrová =

Czech swimmer (born 1979)

Personal information
- Nationality: Czech Republic
- Born: 3 February 1979 (age 47) Znojmo, Czechoslovakia
- Height: 1.75 m (5 ft 9 in)
- Weight: 60 kg (132 lb)

Sport
- Sport: Swimming
- Strokes: Freestyle
- Club: TJ Znojmo
Medal record
European Championships (SC)
Gold medal – first place	1996 Rostock	400 m freestyle

Kristýna Kyněrová (born 3 February 1979) is a Czech retired freestyle swimmer. She twice competed for the Czech Republic at the Summer Olympics: in 1996 and 2004.
