= Sofie Goffin =

Belgian swimmer (born 1979)

Personal information
- Born: 21 November 1979 (age 46) Merksem, Antwerp, Belgium
- Height: 1.71 m (5 ft 7 in)
- Weight: 59 kg (130 lb)
Medal record
Women's swimming
Representing Belgium
European Championships
Bronze medal – third place	2000 Helsinki	4×100 m freestyle relay

Sofie Goffin (born 21 November 1979) is a retired Belgian freestyle swimmer. She won a bronze medal in the 4 × 100 m freestyle relay at the 2000 European Aquatics Championships and participated in the 2000 Summer Olympics in three events, but did not reach the finals.

Goffin started her international career with the 1998 FINA World Championships in Australia. In 2000, she won a European bronze medal, and in 2001 set a national record in the 400 m freestyle. She retired in 2004 after failing to qualify for the European Championships.

Goffin has a diploma in communications and worked as a language teacher. After retirement she became involved in politics, and in March 2012 was elected as councillor to the city hall of Schoten, representing the CD&V party. She has a daughter, born in 2010.
