= Carla Geurts =

Dutch swimmer (born 1971)

Personal information
- Full name: Carla Louise Maria Geurts
- Nationality: Netherlands
- Born: 20 April 1971 (age 55) Geldrop, Netherlands
- Height: 1.75 m (5 ft 9 in)
- Weight: 62 kg (137 lb)

Sport
- Sport: Swimming
- Strokes: Freestyle
- Club: Nuenen, De Dolfijn, UZSC, UNB Reds, PSV
Medal record
Women's swimming
World Championships (SC)
Silver medal – second place	1995 Rio de Janeiro	400 m freestyle
Silver medal – second place	1995 Rio de Janeiro	800 m freestyle
Bronze medal – third place	1997 Gothenburg	800 m freestyle
European Championships (LC)
Silver medal – second place	1993 Slapy (Czech Republic)	5 km open water
Silver medal – second place	1995 Vienna	400 m freestyle
Silver medal – second place	1995 Vienna	4×200 m freestyle
Silver medal – second place	1997 Seville	800 m freestyle
European Championships (SC)
Gold medal – first place	1996 Rostock	800 m freestyle
Gold medal – first place	1998 Sheffield	400 m freestyle
Silver medal – second place	1996 Rostock	400 m freestyle
Silver medal – second place	1998 Sheffield	800 m freestyle
Bronze medal – third place	1996 Rostock	200 m freestyle

Carla Geurts (born 20 April 1971) is a former Dutch freestyle swimmer who competed at the 1996 Olympic Games in Atlanta, Georgia, and the 2000 Olympic Games in Sydney, Australia for the Netherlands. Geurts won three silver medals during her career at the European Swimming Championships. She retired in 2001, after the 2001 World Aquatics Championships in Fukuoka.

Guerts was born in Geldrop. In September 2006, she was a professor of Kinesiology and Physiology at Brock University, in St. Catharines, Ontario. Geurts Currently resides in Ottawa and works at the University de Ottawa as a Professor of Kinesiology and Physiology.
