= Swimming at the 2003 World Aquatics Championships – Women's 100 metre backstroke =

Women's 100m Backstroke at the 2003 FINA World Aquatics Championships
- Venue: Palau Sant Jordi
- Dates: 21 July (prelims + semis); 22 July (final)

Medalists
gold medal	Antje Buschschulte	Germany
silver medal	Louise Ørnstedt	Denmark
silver medal	Katy Sexton	Great Britain

The Women's 100m Backstroke event at the 10th FINA World Aquatics Championships swam on 21–22 July 2003 in Barcelona, Spain. Preliminary heats swam during the morning session on July 21, with the top-16 finishers advancing to Semifinals that evening. The top-8 finishers then advanced to swim again in the Final the next evening.

At the start of the event, the World (WR) and Championship (CR) records were:

- WR: 59.58 swum by Natalie Coughlin (USA) on August 13, 2002 in Fort Lauderdale, USA.
- CR: 1:00.16 swum by Cihong He (China) on September 10, 1994 in Rome, Italy

== Results ==
=== Final ===
Place	Swimmer	Nation	Time	Notes
1	Antje Buschschulte	Germany	1:00.50	
2	Louise Ørnstedt	Denmark	1:00.86	
2	Katy Sexton	Great Britain	1:00.86	
4	Nina Zhivanevskaya	Spain	1:01.18	
5	Stanislava Komarova	Russia	1:01.36	
6	Iryna Amshennikova	Ukraine	1:01.43	
7	Mai Nakamura	Japan	1:01.51	
8	Sarah Price	Great Britain	1:01.63	

=== Seminfinals ===
Rank	Heat + Lane	Swimmer	Nation	Time	Notes
1	S2 L4	Antje Buschschulte	Germany	1:00.61	q
2	S2 L5	Nina Zhivanevskaya	Spain	1:00.74	q
3	S1 L3	Katy Sexton	Great Britain	1:01.32	q
4	S2 L6	Iryna Amshennikova	Ukraine	1:01.39	q
5	S1 L5	Stanislava Komarova	Russia	1:01.42	q
6	S1 L4	Mai Nakamura	Japan	1:01.47	q
7	S1 L2	Louise Ørnstedt	Denmark	1:01.59	q
8	S2 L2	Sarah Price	Great Britain	1:01.61	q
9	S2 L3	Reiko Nakamura	Japan	1:01.64	
10	S2 L1	Shu Zhan	China	1:01.78	
11	S1 L7	Laure Manaudou	France	1:02.42	
12	S1 L8	Sanja Jovanović	Croatia	1:02.47	
12	S1 L6	Hannah McLean	New Zealand	1:02.47	
14	S2 L7	Ilona Hlaváčková	Czech Republic	1:02.80	
15	S2 L8	Jennifer Carroll	Canada	1:03.08	
16	S1 L1	Xiujun Chen	China	1:03.19	

=== Prelims ===
Rank	Heat+Lane	Swimmer	Nation	Time	Notes
1	H6 L5	Antje Buschschulte	Germany	1:01.16	q
2	H7 L3	Mai Nakamura	Japan	1:01.18	q
2	H8 L5	Nina Zhivanevskaya	Spain	1:01.18	q
4	H6 L3	Stanislava Komarova	Russia	1:01.44	q
5	H6 L6	Reiko Nakamura	Japan	1:01.57	q
6	H7 L4	Katy Sexton	Great Britain	1:01.78	q
7	H6 L1	Iryna Amshennikova	Ukraine	1:01.90	q
8	H6 L7	Hannah McLean	New Zealand	1:02.15	q
9	H6 L4	Sarah Price	Great Britain	1:02.21	q
10	H7 L5	Louise Ørnstedt	Denmark	1:02.23	q
11	H7 L8	Ilona Hlaváčková	Czech Republic	1:02.43	q
12	H7 L6	Laure Manaudou	France	1:02.61	q
12	H8 L6	Shu Zhan	China	1:02.61	q
14	H6 L2	Xiujun Chen	China	1:02.69	q
15	H7 L1	Jennifer Carroll	Canada	1:02.71	q
16	H8 L7	Sanja Jovanović	Croatia	1:02.72	q
17	H1 L2	Min Ji Shim	South Korea	1:02.87	
18	H7 L2	Erin Gammel	Canada	1:02.93	
19	H8 L2	Kirsty Coventry	Zimbabwe	1:03.09	
20	H8 L1	Alessandra Cappa	Italy	1:03.13	
21	H5 L6	Hanna-Maria Seppälä	Finland	1:03.16	
22	H8 L4	Natalie Coughlin	United States	1:03.18	
23	H7 L7	Giaan Rooney	Australia	1:03.30	
24	H6 L8	Hinkelien Schreuder	Netherlands	1:03.40	
25	H8 L3	Haley Cope	United States	1:03.45	
26	H8 L8	Melissa Morgan	Australia	1:03.52	
27	H5 L5	Sherry Tsai	Hong Kong	1:03.93	
28	H5 L3	Eirini Karastergiou	Greece	1:04.14	
29	H5 L4	Anna Gostomelsky	Israel	1:04.94	
30	H5 L7	Dominique Diezi	Switzerland	1:05.30	
31	H5 L2	Chonlathorn Vorathamrong	Thailand	1:05.34	
32	H5 L1	Derya Erke	Turkey	1:05.36	
33	H4 L3	Serrana Fernández	Uruguay	1:05.51	
34	H3 L6	Anja Rikey Jakobsdóttir	Iceland	1:05.80	
35	H4 L1	Kiera Aitken	Bermuda	1:06.07	
36	H5 L8	Susannah Moonan	Sweden	1:06.27	
37	H4 L4	Talita Ribeiro	Brazil	1:06.28	
38	H4 L5	Marie-Lizza Toinette Danila	Philippines	1:06.83	
39	H1 L3	Berit Aljand	Estonia	1:06.86	
39	H4 L6	Edith Van der Schilden	Luxembourg	1:06.86	
41	H3 L5	Shikha Tandon	India	1:07.82	
42	H4 L2	Danijela Djikanovic	FR Yugoslavia	1:07.96	
43	H3 L4	Agnese Ozolina	Latvia	1:07.97	
44	H4 L7	Saida Iskandarova	Uzbekistan	1:08.50	
45	H3 L7	Ayeisha Collymore	Trinidad and Tobago	1:08.79	
46	H4 L8	Marianella Marin	Costa Rica	1:09.32	
47	H3 L2	Khadija Ciss	Senegal	1:09.64	
48	H3 L3	Valeria Silva	Peru	1:09.83	
49	H3 L1	Susan Anchia	Costa Rica	1:11.84	
50	H2 L4	Olga Gnedovskaya	Uzbekistan	1:13.49	
51	H2 L3	Krystle Babao	Papua New Guinea	1:13.73	
52	H2 L5	Ana Galindo	Honduras	1:15.97	
53	H2 L6	Kiran Khan	Pakistan	1:16.04	
54	H2 L2	Jakie Wellman	Zambia	1:17.85	
55	H2 L7	Binta Zahra Diop	Senegal	1:19.39	
56	H3 L8	Helena Rojkova	Turkmenistan	1:20.16	
57	H2 L1	Monika Bakale	Republic of the Congo	1:20.50	
58	H1 L5	Tojohanitra Andriamanjatoarimanana	Madagascar	1:23.66	
59	H1 L4	N. Ravojanahary	Madagascar	1:26.61	
60	H1 L6	Aminath Rouya Hussain	Maldives	1:31.91	
-	-	Sivranjani Vaidyanathan	India	DNS	
