= Swimming at the 2003 World Aquatics Championships – Women's 50 metre backstroke =

Women's 50m Backstroke at the 2003 FINA World Aquatics Championships
- Venue: Palau Sant Jordi
- Dates: 23 July (prelims + semis); 24 July (final)

Medalists
| gold medal | Nina Zhivanevskaya | Spain |
| silver medal | Ilona Hlavackova | Czech Republic |
| bronze medal | Noriko Inada | Japan |

The Women's 50m Backstroke event at the 10th FINA World Aquatics Championships swam on 23–24 July 2003 in Barcelona, Spain. Preliminary heats swam during the morning session on July 23, with the top-16 finishers advancing to Semifinals that evening. The top-8 finishers then advanced to swim again in the Final the next evening.

At the start of the event, the World (WR) and Championship (CR) records were:

- WR: 28.25 swum by Sandra Völker (Germany) on June 17, 2000 in Berlin, Germany.
- CR: 28.48 swum by Natalie Coughlin (USA) on July 23, 2001 in Fukuoka, Japan

== Results ==
=== Final ===
| Place | Swimmer | Nation | Time | Notes |
|---|---|---|---|---|
| 1 | Nina Zhivanevskaya | Spain | 28.48 | CR |
| 2 | Ilona Hlaváčková | Czech Republic | 28.50 | |
| 3 | Noriko Inada | Japan | 28.62 | |
| 4 | Jennifer Carroll | Canada | 28.65 | |
| 5 | Sandra Völker | Germany | 28.69 | |
| 6 | Louise Ørnstedt | Denmark | 28.93 | |
| 7 | Laure Manaudou | France | 28.98 | |
| 8 | Haley Cope | USA | 28.99 | |

=== Semifinals ===
| Rank | Heat + Lane | Swimmer | Nation | Time | Notes |
|---|---|---|---|---|---|
| 1 | S1 L4 | Nina Zhivanevskaya | Spain | 28.52 | q |
| 2 | S2 L4 | Ilona Hlaváčková | Czech Republic | 28.62 | q |
| 3 | S2 L3 | Sandra Völker | Germany | 28.79 | q |
| 4 | S1 L6 | Haley Cope | USA | 28.80 | q |
| 4 | S2 L7 | Louise Ørnstedt | Denmark | 28.80 | q |
| 6 | S2 L5 | Noriko Inada | Japan | 28.82 | q |
| 7 | S1 L3 | Laure Manaudou | France | 28.86 | q |
| 8 | S1 L5 | Jennifer Carroll | Canada | 28.91 | q |
| 9 | S1 L8 | Jiaru Cheng | China | 28.94 | |
| 10 | S1 L2 | Giaan Rooney | Australia | 28.96 | |
| 11 | S2 L6 | Mai Nakamura | Japan | 29.03 | |
| 12 | S1 L7 | Min Ji Shim | South Korea | 29.05 | |
| 13 | S2 L2 | Sanja Jovanović | Croatia | 29.20 | |
| 14 | S2 L8 | Erin Gammel | Canada | 29.25 | |
| 15 | S1 L1 | Hannah McLean | New Zealand | 29.36 | |
| 16 | S2 L1 | Hanna-Maria Seppälä | Finland | 29.64 | |

=== Preliminaries ===
| Rank | Heat+Lane | Swimmer | Nation | Time | Notes |
|---|---|---|---|---|---|
| 1 | H9 L5 | Ilona Hlaváčková | Czech Republic | 28.67 | q |
| 2 | H9 L4 | Nina Zhivanevskaya | Spain | 28.85 | q |
| 3 | H9 L3 | Noriko Inada | Japan | 28.88 | q |
| 4 | H7 L5 | Jennifer Carroll | Canada | 29.00 | q |
| 5 | H8 L5 | Sandra Völker | Germany | 29.02 | q |
| 6 | H8 L3 | Laure Manaudou | France | 29.05 | q |
| 7 | H7 L4 | Mai Nakamura | Japan | 29.11 | q |
| 8 | H9 L1 | Haley Cope | United States | 29.17 | q |
| 9 | H7 L2 | Sanja Jovanović | Croatia | 29.18 | q |
| 10 | H9 L6 | Giaan Rooney | Australia | 29.25 | q |
| 11 | H8 L4 | Louise Ørnstedt | Denmark | 29.26 | q |
| 12 | H1 L5 | Min Ji Shim | South Korea | 29.41 | q |
| 13 | H8 L8 | Hanna-Maria Seppälä | Finland | 29.43 | q |
| 14 | H9 L7 | Hannah McLean | New Zealand | 29.45 | q |
| 15 | H8 L2 | Erin Gammel | Canada | 29.46 | q |
| 15 | H9 L8 | Jiaru Cheng | China | 29.46 | q |
| 17 | H8 L1 | Shu Zhan | China | 29.47 | |
| 18 | H9 L2 | Sophie Edington | Australia | 29.49 | |
| 19 | H8 L7 | Alessandra Cappa | Italy | 29.54 | |
| 20 | H7 L1 | Iryna Amshennikova | Ukraine | 29.60 | |
| 21 | H7 L7 | Hinkelien Schreuder | Netherlands | 29.61 | |
| 22 | H7 L3 | Sarah Price | Great Britain | 29.66 | |
| 23 | H6 L6 | Margaret Hoelzer | United States | 29.73 | |
| 24 | H8 L6 | Katy Sexton | Great Britain | 29.85 | |
| 25 | H1 L4 | Sviatlana Khakhlova | Belarus | 29.97 | |
| 26 | H7 L6 | Tine Bossuyt | Belgium | 30.06 | |
| 27 | H6 L4 | Dominique Diezi | Switzerland | 30.10 | |
| 28 | H6 L2 | Susannah Moonan | Sweden | 30.18 | |
| 29 | H6 L7 | Sherry Tsai | Hong Kong | 30.19 | |
| 30 | H7 L8 | Serrana Fernández | Uruguay | 30.20 | |
| 31 | H6 L5 | Anna Gostomelsky | Israel | 30.54 | |
| 32 | H5 L3 | Eirini Karastergiou | Greece | 30.61 | |
| 33 | H5 L4 | Kiera Aitken | Bermuda | 30.80 | |
| 34 | H5 L8 | Anja Rikey Jakobsdóttir | Iceland | 30.89 | |
| 35 | H6 L8 | Talita Ribeiro | Brazil | 30.90 | |
| 36 | H5 L6 | Edith Van der Schilden | Luxembourg | 31.11 | |
| 37 | H2 L2 | Marie-Lizza Toinette Danila | Philippines | 31.23 | |
| 38 | H5 L5 | Danijela Djikanovic | FR Yugoslavia | 31.29 | |
| 39 | H5 L1 | Larissa Komt | Peru | 31.41 | |
| 40 | H6 L1 | Derya Erke | Turkey | 31.42 | |
| 41 | H2 L6 | Berit Aljand | Estonia | 31.52 | |
| 42 | H5 L2 | Saida Iskandarova | Uzbekistan | 31.61 | |
| 43 | H5 L7 | Ayeisha Collymore | Trinidad and Tobago | 31.68 | |
| 44 | H6 L3 | Marianella Marin | Costa Rica | 31.92 | |
| 45 | H4 L5 | Valeria Silva | Peru | 32.33 | |
| 46 | H4 L4 | Khadija Ciss | Senegal | 32.48 | |
| 47 | H4 L6 | Olga Gnedovskaya | Uzbekistan | 33.82 | |
| 47 | H4 L7 | Krystle Babao | Papua New Guinea | 33.82 | |
| 49 | H2 L7 | Nicole Hayes | Palau | 34.37 | |
| 50 | H4 L3 | Susan Anchia | Costa Rica | 34.62 | |
| 51 | H3 L3 | Monika Bakale | Republic of the Congo | 35.09 | |
| 52 | H3 L8 | Samera Bitar | Bahrain | 35.31 | |
| 53 | H4 L1 | Rubab Raza | Pakistan | 35.75 | |
| 54 | H3 L6 | Jakie Wellman | Zambia | 36.14 | |
| 55 | H4 L2 | Menaka de Silva | Sri Lanka | 36.15 | |
| 56 | H3 L5 | Helena Rojkova | Turkmenistan | 36.32 | |
| 57 | H3 L2 | Binta Zahra Diop | Senegal | 36.36 | |
| 58 | H3 L1 | N. Ravojanahary | Madagascar | 37.75 | |
| 59 | H1 L3 | Amber Yobech | Palau | 37.84 | |
| 60 | H3 L4 | Ghazal El Jobeili | Lebanon | 37.87 | |
| 61 | H3 L7 | Liana Ramerison Rabenja | Madagascar | 38.09 | |
| 62 | H4 L8 | Joana Gjini | Albania | 38.55 | |
| 63 | H2 L5 | Jumana Taraif | Bahrain | 40.02 | |
| 64 | H2 L3 | Mariyam Nafha Ali | Maldives | 41.82 | |
| - | - | Elize Taua | Samoa | DNS | |
