= Swimming at the 2003 World Aquatics Championships – Women's 200 metre backstroke =

Women's 200m Backstroke at the 2003 FINA World Aquatics Championships
- Venue: Palau Sant Jordi
- Dates: 25 July (prelims + semis); 26 July (final)

Medalists
gold medal	Katy Sexton	Great Britain
silver medal	Margaret Hoelzer	United States
bronze medal	Stanislava Komarova	Russia

The Women's 200m Backstroke event at the 10th FINA World Aquatics Championships swam on 25–26 July 2003 in Barcelona, Spain. Preliminary heats swam during the morning session on July 25, with the top-16 finishers advancing to Semifinals that evening. The top-8 finishers then advanced to swim again in the Final the next evening.

At the start of the event, the World (WR) and Championship (CR) records were:

- WR: 2:06.62 swum by Krisztina Egerszegi (Hungary) on August 25, 1991 in Athens, Greece.
- CR: 2:07.40 swum by Cihong He (China) on September 11, 1994 in Rome, Italy

== Results ==
=== Final ===
Place	Swimmer	Nation	Time	Notes
1	Katy Sexton	Great Britain	2:08.74	
2	Margaret Hoelzer	USA	2:09.24	
3	Stanislava Komarova	Russia	2:10.17	
4	Iryna Amshennikova	Ukraine	2:10.82	
5	Hanae Ito	Japan	2:10.95	
6	Jennifer Fratesi	Canada	2:12.53	
7	Nicole Hetzer	Germany	2:12.82	
8	Sarah Price	Great Britain	2:13.78	

=== Semifinals ===
Rank	Heat + Lane	Swimmer	Nation	Time	Notes
1	S2 L4	Stanislava Komarova	Russia	2:09.39	q
2	S2 L2	Katy Sexton	Great Britain	2:10.47	q
3	S1 L4	Iryna Amshennikova	Ukraine	2:11.08	q
4	S2 L6	Hanae Ito	Japan	2:11.13	q
5	S2 L5	Margaret Hoelzer	USA	2:11.38	q
6	S1 L3	Sarah Price	Great Britain	2:11.69	q
7	S1 L1	Nicole Hetzer	Germany	2:12.15	q
8	S1 L5	Jennifer Fratesi	Canada	2:12.36	q
9	S2 L3	Aya Terakawa	Japan	2:13.09	
10	S1 L7	Hannah McLean	New Zealand	2:13.39	
11	S1 L6	Alenka Kejžar	Slovenia	2:13.50	
12	S2 L8	Anja Čarman	Slovenia	2:14.58	
13	S2 L7	Louise Ørnstedt	Denmark	2:14.61	
14	S1 L8	Kirsty Coventry	Zimbabwe	2:15.20	
15	S2 L1	Sanja Jovanović	Croatia	2:15.43	
16	S1 L2	Frances Adcock	Australia	2:15.49	

=== Preliminaries ===
Rank	Heat+Lane	Swimmer	Nation	Time	Notes
1	H3 L4	Stanislava Komarova	Russia	2:10.98	q
2	H3 L3	Iryna Amshennikova	Ukraine	2:11.93	q
3	H4 L5	Margaret Hoelzer	United States	2:12.35	q
4	H5 L6	Jennifer Fratesi	Canada	2:12.72	q
5	H5 L3	Aya Terakawa	Japan	2:12.79	q
6	H5 L5	Sarah Price	Great Britain	2:12.82	q
7	H3 L5	Hanae Ito	Japan	2:13.01	q
8	H3 L6	Alenka Kejžar	Slovenia	2:13.32	q
9	H4 L4	Katy Sexton	Great Britain	2:13.57	q
10	H5 L1	Frances Adcock	Australia	2:13.78	q
11	H4 L3	Louise Ørnstedt	Denmark	2:14.37	q
12	H3 L7	Hannah McLean	New Zealand	2:14.38	q
13	H5 L7	Sanja Jovanović	Croatia	2:14.75	q
14	H4 L1	Nicole Hetzer	Germany	2:14.90	q
15	H4 L8	Anja Čarman	Slovenia	2:14.91	q
16	H4 L6	Kirsty Coventry	Zimbabwe	2:14.92	q
17	H3 L1	Melissa Corfe	South Africa	2:15.25	
18	H4 L2	Elizabeth Warden	Canada	2:15.64	
19	H5 L2	Shu Zhan	China	2:16.43	
20	H4 L7	Zoe Tonks	Australia	2:16.53	
21	H5 L8	Anna Gostomelsky	Israel	2:17.60	
22	H3 L2	Xiujun Chen	China	2:18.06	
23	H2 L4	Helen Norfolk	New Zealand	2:18.88	
24	H2 L5	Sherry Tsai	Hong Kong	2:19.27	
25	H3 L8	Derya Erke	Turkey	2:19.39	
26	H2 L3	Inbal Levavi	Israel	2:19.47	
27	H2 L6	Chonlathorn Vorathamrong	Thailand	2:20.33	
28	H1 L1	Berit Aljand	Estonia	2:22.58	
29	H2 L8	Valeria Silva	Peru	2:22.91	
30	H2 L7	Edith Van der Schilden	Luxembourg	2:23.94	
31	H2 L2	Marie-Lizza Toinette Danila	Philippines	2:24.72	
32	H2 L1	Saida Iskandarova	Uzbekistan	2:25.52	
33	H1 L3	Susan Anchia	Costa Rica	2:28.49	
34	H1 L5	Khadija Ciss	Senegal	2:29.60	
35	H1 L2	Ana Galindo	Honduras	2:35.71	
36	H1 L6	Olga Gnedovskaya	Uzbekistan	2:39.72	
37	H1 L7	Krystle Babao	Papua New Guinea	2:44.93	
-	-	Natalie Coughlin	United States	DNS	
-	-	Talita Ribeiro	Brazil	DNS	
