= Swimming at the 2005 World Aquatics Championships – Women's 50 metre backstroke =

Women's 50m Backstroke at the 2005 FINA World Aquatics Championships
- Dates: 27 July (heats and semifinals); 28 July (final)
- Competitors: 65 from 47 nations
- Winning time: 28.63 seconds

Medalists
| gold medal | Giaan Rooney | Australia |
| silver medal | Gao Chang | China |
| bronze medal | Antje Buschschulte | Germany |

The Women's 50 Backstroke event at the 11th FINA World Aquatics Championships was swum 27 – 28 July 2005 in Montreal, Quebec, Canada. Preliminary (morning) and Semifinal (evening) heats were on 27 July, with the event's Final heat swum during the evening session on 28 July.

At the start of the vent, the existing World (WR) and Championships (CR) records were:

- WR: 28.19, Janine Pietsch (Germany) swum 25 May 2005 in Berlin, Germany;
- ER: 28.48, Nina Zhivanevskaya (Spain) swum 24 July 2004 in Barcelona, Spain

== Results ==
=== Preliminaries ===
| Rank | Heat + Lane | Swimmer | Nation | Time | Notes |
|---|---|---|---|---|---|
| 1 | H7 L4 | GAO Chang | China | 28.70 | q |
| 2 | H7 L5 | Mai Nakamura | Japan | 28.92 | q |
| 3 | H9 L4 | Janine Pietsch | Germany | 28.95 | q |
| 4 | H8 L4 | Giaan Rooney | Australia | 28.99 | q |
| 4 | H9 L5 | Antje Buschschulte | Germany | 28.99 | q |
| 6 | H6 L4 | Elizabeth Coster | New Zealand | 29.05 | q |
| 7 | H8 L1 | Hannah McLean | New Zealand | 29.06 | q |
| 8 | H9 L6 | Fabienne Nadarajah | Austria | 29.14 | q |
| 9 | H8 L5 | Sophie Edington | Australia | 29.22 | q |
| 10 | H8 L7 | Svitlana Khakhlova | Belarus | 29.23 | q |
| 10 | H9 L3 | Louise Ørnstedt | Denmark | 29.23 | q |
| 12 | H7 L3 | Hinkelien Schreuder | Netherlands | 29.25 | q |
| 13 | H7 L1 | Nam-Eun Lee | South Korea | 29.26 | q |
| 14 | H9 L1 | Sanja Jovanović | Croatia | 29.27 | q |
| 15 | H9 L7 | Fabíola Molina | Brazil | 29.40 | q |
| 16 | H7 L7 | Erin Gammel | Canada | 29.44 | q |
| 17 | H8 L3 | Hanae Ito | Japan | 29.45 | |
| 18 | H8 L6 | Jennifer Carroll | Canada | 29.55 | |
| 19 | H9 L2 | Iryna Amshennikova | Ukraine | 29.59 | |
| 20 | H8 L2 | Chen Yanyan | China | 29.63 | |
| 21 | H7 L6 | Elena Gemo | Italy | 29.65 | |
| 22 | H7 L8 | Kateryna Zubkova | Ukraine | 29.68 | |
| 23 | H6 L1 | Margaret Hoelzer | United States | 29.71 | |
| 24 | H5 L2 | Anna Gostomelsky | Israel | 29.79 | |
| 25 | H7 L2 | Ilona Hlaváčková | Czech Republic | 29.97 | |
| 26 | H6 L7 | Katarzyna Staszak | Poland | 30.11 | |
| 27 | H9 L8 | Gisela Morales | Guatemala | 30.12 | |
| 28 | H5 L4 | Jeri Moss | United States | 30.16 | |
| 29 | H8 L8 | Alexandra Putra | France | 30.28 | |
| 30 | H6 L8 | Petra Klosova | Czech Republic | 30.34 | |
| 31 | H5 L3 | Kiera Aitken | Bermuda | 30.36 | |
| 32 | H5 L7 | Hannah Wilson | Hong Kong | 30.52 | |
| 33 | H5 L5 | Hanna-Maria Seppälä | Finland | 30.55 | |
| 34 | H4 L4 | Marilies Demal | Austria | 30.70 | |
| 35 | H6 L3 | Jane Kaljonen | Finland | 30.82 | |
| 36 | H6 L2 | Yu Yon Kim | South Korea | 30.96 | |
| 37 | H6 L5 | Flavia Cazziolato | Brazil | 30.99 | |
| 38 | H6 L6 | Chonlathorn Vorathamrong | Thailand | 31.17 | |
| 39 | H5 L1 | Lynette Ng | Singapore | 31.19 | |
| 40 | H5 L8 | Carolina Colorado Henao | Colombia | 31.31 | |
| 41 | H5 L6 | Ting-Wei Lin | Chinese Taipei | 31.63 | |
| 42 | H4 L8 | Lenient Obia | Nigeria | 31.79 | |
| 43 | H4 L2 | Danit Kama | Israel | 32.17 | |
| 44 | H4 L6 | Fatima Valderrama | Peru | 32.38 | |
| 45 | H4 L7 | Khadija Ciss | Senegal | 32.45 | |
| 46 | H4 L3 | Saida Iskandarova | Uzbekistan | 32.47 | |
| 47 | H3 L6 | Nicole Marmol | Ecuador | 32.63 | |
| 48 | H4 L1 | Mireille Hakimeh | Syria | 32.79 | |
| 49 | H3 L4 | Cheok Mei Ma | Macau | 32.93 | |
| 50 | H3 L8 | Imane Boulaamane | Morocco | 33.13 | |
| 50 | H4 L5 | Laura Rodriguez | Dominican Republic | 33.13 | |
| 52 | H2 L6 | Ellen Hight | Zambia | 33.22 | |
| 53 | H3 L2 | Jonay Briedenhann | Namibia | 33.46 | |
| 54 | H3 L1 | Kiran Khan | Pakistan | 33.61 | |
| 55 | H2 L5 | Prabha Madhavi Dharmadasa | Sri Lanka | 33.73 | |
| 56 | H3 L7 | Jessica Vieira | Mozambique | 34.09 | |
| 57 | H3 L3 | Weng I Kuan | Macau | 34.11 | |
| 58 | H3 L5 | Ruth Ho | Singapore | 34.13 | |
| 59 | H2 L4 | Rubab Raza | Pakistan | 34.66 | |
| 60 | H2 L2 | Jakie Wellman | Zambia | 34.74 | |
| 61 | H1 L4 | Yelena Rojkova | Turkmenistan | 35.33 | |
| 62 | H2 L7 | Mbolatiana Ramanisa | Madagascar | 35.45 | |
| 63 | H2 L3 | Sussie Pineda | Honduras | 35.46 | |
| 64 | H1 L3 | Debra Daniel | Federated States of Micronesia | 35.97 | |
| 65 | H1 L5 | Natasaha Ratter | Uganda | 37.89 | |

=== Semifinals ===
| Rank | Heat + Lane | Swimmer | Nation | Time | Notes |
|---|---|---|---|---|---|
| 1 | S2 L4 | GAO Chang | China | 28.31 | q, CR |
| 2 | S1 L5 | Giaan Rooney | Australia | 28.78 | q |
| 3 | S1 L4 | Mai Nakamura | Japan | 28.87 | q |
| 3 | S2 L2 | Sophie Edington | Australia | 28.87 | q |
| 5 | S2 L3 | Antje Buschschulte | Germany | 28.90 | q |
| 6 | S2 L5 | Janine Pietsch | Germany | 28.93 | q |
| 7 | S2 L1 | Nam-Eun Lee | South Korea | 28.95 | q |
| 8 | S2 L6 | Hannah McLean | New Zealand | 28.99 | q |
| 9 | S2 L7 | Louise Ørnstedt | Denmark | 29.03 | |
| 10 | S1 L1 | Sanja Jovanović | Croatia | 29.06 | |
| 11 | S1 L3 | Elizabeth Coster | New Zealand | 29.15 | |
| 12 | S1 L6 | Fabienne Nadarajah | Austria | 29.19 | |
| 13 | S1 L8 | Erin Gammel | Canada | 29.35 | |
| 14 | S2 L8 | Fabíola Molina | Brazil | 29.39 | |
| 15 | S1 L2 | Svitlana Khakhlova | Belarus | 29.41 | |
| 16 | S1 L7 | Hinkelien Schreuder | Netherlands | 29.61 | |

=== Final ===
| Rank | Swimmer | Nation | Time | Notes |
|---|---|---|---|---|
| 1st place, gold medalist(s) | Giaan Rooney | Australia | 28.63 | |
| 2nd place, silver medalist(s) | GAO Chang | China | 28.69 | |
| 3rd place, bronze medalist(s) | Antje Buschschulte | Germany | 28.72 | |
| 4 | Mai Nakamura | Japan | 28.86 | |
| 5 | Sophie Edington | Australia | 28.87 | |
| 6 | Janine Pietsch | Germany | 28.88 | |
| 7 | Hannah McLean | New Zealand | 28.90 | |
| 8 | Nam-Eun Lee | South Korea | 29.35 | |
