= Swimming at the 2005 World Aquatics Championships – Women's 100 metre backstroke =

Women's 100m Backstroke at the 2005 FINA World Aquatics Championships
- Dates: 25 July (prelims and semifinals); 26 July (final)
- Competitors: 70
- Winning time: 1 minute .24 seconds

Medalists
gold medal	Kirsty Coventry	Zimbabwe
silver medal	Antje Buschschulte	Germany
bronze medal	Natalie Coughlin	United States

The Women's 100 Backstroke at the 11th FINA World Aquatics Championships was swum 25 – 26 July 2005 in Montreal, Quebec, Canada. Preliminary and Semifinal heats were 25 July; the Final heat on 26 July.

At the start of the event, the existing World (WR) and Championships (CR) records were:

- WR: 59.58, Natalie Coughlin (USA), swum 13 August 2002 in Fort Lauderdale, USA;
- CR: 1:00.16, Cihong He (China), swum 10 September 1994 in Rome, Italy

== Results ==
=== Preliminaries ===
Rank	Heat + Lane	Swimmer	Nation	Time	Notes
1	H9 L4	Natalie Coughlin	United States	1:01.25	q
2	H7 L3	Reiko Nakamura	Japan	1:01.40	q
3	H8 L5	Antje Buschschulte	Germany	1:01.41	q
4	H9 L2	Hannah McLean	New Zealand	1:01.46	q
5	H7 L4	Kirsty Coventry	Zimbabwe	1:01.51	q
6	H8 L3	Hanae Ito	Japan	1:01.95	q
7	H8 L4	Louise Ørnstedt	Denmark	1:02.07	q
8	H9 L3	Giaan Rooney	Australia	1:02.25	q
9	H7 L8	Janine Pietsch	Germany	1:02.37	q
10	H9 L6	Stanislava Komarova	Russia	1:02.46	q
11	H7 L5	Sophie Edington	Australia	1:02.48	q
12	H9 L7	Chen Yanyan	China	1:02.49	q
13	H8 L1	Alessia Filippi	Italy	1:02.50	q
13	H9 L1	Jeri Moss	United States	1:02.50	q
15	H8 L6	GAO Chang	China	1:02.62	q
16	H8 L7	Kateryna Zubkova	Ukraine	1:02.92	q
17	H7 L2	Erin Gammel	Canada	1:02.96	
18	H8 L2	Iryna Amshennikova	Ukraine	1:03.12	
19	H6 L2	Fabíola Molina	Brazil	1:03.14	
20	H7 L1	Kelly Stefanyshyn	Canada	1:03.19	
21	H6 L7	Katarzyna Staszak	Poland	1:03.27	
22	H8 L8	Yoo Jin Jung	South Korea	1:03.39	
23	H5 L5	Melissa Ingram	New Zealand	1:03.41	
24	H9 L8	Sanja Jovanović	Croatia	1:03.46	
25	H6 L1	Anna Gostomelsky	Israel	1:03.56	
26	H6 L3	Nam-Eun Lee	South Korea	1:03.67	
27	H6 L4	Gisela Morales	Guatemala	1:03.81	
28	H7 L6	Alexandra Putra	France	1:03.88	
29	H6 L5	Svitlana Khkhlova	Belarus	1:03.98	
30	H6 L6	Therese Svendsen	Sweden	1:04.19	
31	H5 L3	Hanna-Maria Seppälä	Finland	1:04.61	
32	H4 L3	Petra Klosova	Czech Republic	1:04.86	
33	H7 L7	Gemma Spofforth	Great Britain	1:04.88	
34	H5 L8	Sadan Derya Erke	Turkey	1:05.06	
35	H5 L4	Kiera Aitken	Bermuda	1:05.18	
36	H5 L1	Jane Kaljonen	Finland	1:05.48	
37	H4 L6	Lenka Jarosova	Czech Republic	1:05.67	
38	H5 L7	Anja Čarman	Slovenia	1:05.83	
39	H4 L2	Berit Aljand	Estonia	1:05.90	
40	H4 L5	Hannah Wilson	Hong Kong	1:06.03	
41	H5 L6	Chonlathorn Vorathamrong	Thailand	1:06.31	
42	H6 L8	Man-Hsu Lin	Chinese Taipei	1:06.37	
43	H5 L2	Danit Kama	Israel	1:06.85	
44	H3 L5	Shikha Tandon	India	1:07.32	
45	H3 L4	Carolina Colorado Henao	Colombia	1:07.38	
46	H3 L2	Fatima Valderrama	Peru	1:07.60	
47	H4 L8	Lynette Ng	Singapore	1:07.80	
48	H3 L6	Khadija Ciss	Senegal	1:08.49	
49	H4 L4	Ting-Wei Lin	Chinese Taipei	1:09.02	
50	H4 L1	Bernadette Lee	Singapore	1:09.07	
51	H3 L8	Nicole Marmol	Ecuador	1:09.34	
52	H4 L7	Saida Iskandarova	Uzbekistan	1:09.42	
53	H2 L4	Imane Boulaamane	Morocco	1:09.79	
54	H2 L5	Jonay Briedenhann	Namibia	1:10.08	
55	H3 L3	Laura Rodriguez	Dominican Republic	1:10.45	
56	H2 L2	Man Wai Fong	Macau	1:10.71	
57	H3 L7	Lacken Malateste	Tahiti	1:11.13	
58	H3 L1	Mireille Hakimeh	Syria	1:12.45	
59	H2 L6	Kiran Khan	Pakistan	1:12.94	
60	H2 L3	Weng I Kuan	Macau	1:13.71	
61	H2 L1	Prabha Madhavi Dharmadasa	Sri Lanka	1:14.15	
62	H1 L5	Jessica Vieira	Mozambique	1:15.01	
63	H1 L7	Rubab Raza	Pakistan	1:15.05	
64	H2 L7	Sussie Pineda	Honduras	1:15.94	
65	H1 L4	Yelena Rojkova	Turkmenistan	1:16.77	
66	H2 L8	Mbolatiana Ramanisa	Madagascar	1:18.66	
67	H1 L3	Gabriella Grant	Grenada	1:22.09	
68	H1 L6	Natasaha Ratter	Uganda	1:26.75	
-	H1 L2	Lasm Quissoh Genevieve Meledje	Ivory Coast	DNS	
-	H9 L5	Laure Manaudou	France	DNS	

=== Semifinals ===
Rank	Heat + Lane	Swimmer	Nation	Time	Notes
1	S2 L4	Natalie Coughlin	(United States) USA	1:00.59	
2	S2 L5	Antje Buschschulte	Germany	1:00.67	
3	S1 L5	Hannah McLean	New Zealand	1:01.14	
4	S1 L4	Reiko Nakamura	Japan	1:01.22	
5	S1 L3	Hanae Ito	Japan	1:01.25	
6	S2 L6	Louise Ørnstedt	Denmark	1:01.45	
6	S2 L3	Kirsty Coventry	Zimbabwe	1:01.45	
8	S2 L7	Sophie Edington	Australia	1:01.64	
9	S1 L1	Stanislava Komarova	Russia	1:02.09	
10	S2 L1	Alessia Filippi	Italy	1:02.11	
11	S1 L7	Chen Yanyan	China	1:02.34	
12	S1 L6	Giaan Rooney	Australia	1:02.47	
13	S2 L2	Janine Pietsch	Germany	1:02.49	
14	S1 L8	Kateryna Zubkova	Ukraine	1:02.60	
15	S1 L1	Jeri Moss	(United States) USA	1:02.68	
16	S2 L8	GAO Chang	China	1:02.86	

=== Final ===
Place	Swimmer	Nation	Time	Notes
1st place, gold medalist(s)	Kirsty Coventry	Zimbabwe	1:00.24	
2nd place, silver medalist(s)	Antje Buschschulte	Germany	1:00.84	
3rd place, bronze medalist(s)	Natalie Coughlin	(United States) USA	1:00.88	
4	Reiko Nakamura	Japan	1:01.00	
5	Hannah McLean	New Zealand	1:01.16	
6	Hanae Ito	Japan	1:01.25	
7	Louise Ørnstedt	Denmark	1:01.36	
8	Sophie Edington	Australia	1:01.97	
