= Swimming at the 2004 Summer Olympics – Women's 100 metre backstroke =

Women's 100 metre backstroke at the Games of the XXVIII Olympiad
- Venue: Athens Olympic Aquatic Centre
- Date: August 15, 2004 (heats & semifinals); August 16, 2004 (final)
- Competitors: 41 from 34 nations
- Winning time: 1:00.37

Medalists
1st place, gold medalist(s)		Natalie Coughlin	United States
2nd place, silver medalist(s)		Kirsty Coventry	Zimbabwe
3rd place, bronze medalist(s)		Laure Manaudou	France

The women's 100 metre backstroke event at the 2004 Olympic Games was contested at the Olympic Aquatic Centre of the Athens Olympic Sports Complex in Athens, Greece on August 15 and 16.

U.S. swimmer Natalie Coughlin won the gold medal in this event, outside the record time of 1:00.37. The silver medal was awarded to Zimbabwe's Kirsty Coventry, who finished behind Coughlin by 0.13 of a second, breaking an African record of 1:00.50. France's Laure Manaudou, who won the gold in the 400 m freestyle on the previous day, took home the bronze medal, with a time of 1:00.88. In the semifinals, Coughlin lowered an Olympic record time of 1:00.21, set by Romania's Diana Mocanu in Sydney (2000), to 1:00.17.

== Records ==
Prior to this competition, the existing world and Olympic records were as follows.

World record	Natalie Coughlin (USA)	59.58	Fort Lauderdale, United States	13 August 2002
Olympic record	Diana Mocanu (ROM)	1:00.21	Sydney, Australia	18 September 2000

The following new world and Olympic records were set during this competition.

Date	Event	Name	Nationality	Time	Record
August 15	Semifinal 2	Natalie Coughlin	United States	1:00.17	OR

== Results ==
=== Heats ===
Rank	Heat	Lane	Name	Nationality	Time	Notes
1	4	4	Laure Manaudou	France	1:01.27	Q
2	4	5	Reiko Nakamura	Japan	1:01.39	Q
3	6	4	Natalie Coughlin	United States	1:01.45	Q
4	3	5	Kirsty Coventry	Zimbabwe	1:01.60	Q, AF
5	4	6	Noriko Inada	Japan	1:01.67	Q
6	5	4	Antje Buschschulte	Germany	1:01.68	Q
7	6	5	Nina Zhivanevskaya	Spain	1:01.75	Q
8	4	3	Stanislava Komarova	Russia	1:01.84	Q
9	4	7	Ilona Hlaváčková	Czech Republic	1:01.95	Q
10	5	7	Giaan Rooney	Australia	1:01.96	Q
11	5	3	Haley Cope	United States	1:01.99	Q
12	6	3	Katy Sexton	Great Britain	1:02.01	Q
13	5	5	Louise Ørnstedt	Denmark	1:02.17	Q
13	6	7	Sarah Price	Great Britain	1:02.17	Q
15	6	2	Gao Chang	China	1:02.19	Q
16	4	2	Zhan Shu	China	1:02.39	Q
17	4	1	Erin Gammel	Canada	1:02.47	
17	3	4	Sanja Jovanović	Croatia	1:02.47	
19	5	6	Iryna Amshennikova	Ukraine	1:02.57	
20	5	8	Marieke Guehrer	Australia	1:02.76	
21	6	8	Nikolett Szepesi	Hungary	1:02.78	
22	5	2	Hannah McLean	New Zealand	1:03.09	
23	6	6	Janine Pietsch	Germany	1:03.13	
24	4	8	Shim Min-ji	South Korea	1:03.14	
25	3	3	Sviatlana Khakhlova	Belarus	1:03.25	
26	6	1	Alessandra Cappa	Italy	1:03.50	
27	3	2	Gisela Morales	Guatemala	1:03.72	
28	3	6	Anna Gostomelsky	Israel	1:04.06	
29	5	1	Alexandra Putra	France	1:04.13	
30	3	8	Hiu Wai Sherry Tsai	Hong Kong	1:04.25	
31	2	5	Kiera Aitken	Bermuda	1:04.37	
32	2	1	Chonlathorn Vorathamrong	Thailand	1:05.15	
33	3	1	Eirini Karastergiou	Greece	1:05.30	
34	2	4	Şadan Derya Erke	Turkey	1:05.38	
35	2	3	Serrana Fernández	Uruguay	1:05.51	
36	3	7	Hanna-Maria Seppälä	Finland	1:05.55	
37	2	2	Fu Hsiao-han	Chinese Taipei	1:06.62	
38	2	7	Anastassiya Prilepa	Kazakhstan	1:07.55	
39	1	4	Lenient Obia	Nigeria	1:09.95	
40	1	5	Ana Galindo	Honduras	1:11.80	
41	2	6	Olga Gnedovskaya	Uzbekistan	1:15.33	
42	1	3	Yelena Rojkova	Turkmenistan	1:15.48	

=== Semifinals ===
==== Semifinal 1 ====
Rank	Lane	Name	Nationality	Time	Notes
1	3	Antje Buschschulte	Germany	1:00.94	Q
2	5	Kirsty Coventry	Zimbabwe	1:01.21	Q, AF
3	4	Reiko Nakamura	Japan	1:01.24	Q
4	2	Giaan Rooney	Australia	1:01.41	OC
5	6	Stanislava Komarova	Russia	1:01.63	
6	7	Katy Sexton	Great Britain	1:01.96	
7	8	Zhan Shu	China	1:02.10	
8	1	Sarah Price	Great Britain	1:02.48	

==== Semifinal 2 ====
Rank	Lane	Name	Nationality	Time	Notes
1	5	Natalie Coughlin	United States	1:00.17	Q, OR
2	4	Laure Manaudou	France	1:00.88	Q
3	1	Louise Ørnstedt	Denmark	1:01.12	Q
4	7	Haley Cope	United States	1:01.13	Q
5	6	Nina Zhivanevskaya	Spain	1:01.19	Q
6	3	Noriko Inada	Japan	1:01.74	
7	2	Ilona Hlaváčková	Czech Republic	1:01.81	
8	8	Gao Chang	China	1:02.17	

=== Final ===
Rank	Lane	Swimmer	Nation	Time	Notes
1st place, gold medalist(s)	4	Natalie Coughlin	United States	1:00.37	
2nd place, silver medalist(s)	1	Kirsty Coventry	Zimbabwe	1:00.50	AF
3rd place, bronze medalist(s)	5	Laure Manaudou	France	1:00.88	
4	8	Reiko Nakamura	Japan	1:01.05	
5	7	Nina Zhivanevskaya	Spain	1:01.12	
6	3	Antje Buschschulte	Germany	1:01.39	
7	6	Louise Ørnstedt	Denmark	1:01.51	
8	2	Haley Cope	United States	1:01.76	
