= Swimming at the 2005 World Aquatics Championships – Women's 200 metre backstroke =

Women's 200m Backstroke at the 2005 FINA World Aquatics Championships
- Dates: 29 July (heats and semifinals); 30 July (final)
- Competitors: 47 from 37 nations
- Winning time: 2 minutes 8.52 seconds

Medalists
gold medal	Kirsty Coventry	Zimbabwe
silver medal	Margaret Hoelzer	United States
bronze medal	Reiko Nakamura	Japan

The Women's 200 Backstroke at the 11th FINA World Aquatics Championships was swum 29 – 30 July 2005 in Montreal, Quebec, Canada. It was the longest of the 3 backstroke events for women at the 2005 Worlds. Preliminary and Semifinals heats were swum 29 July, with the Final heat on 30 July. The top 16 finishers from Prelims advanced to swim again in Semifinals; the top 8 swimmers in Semifinals advanced to swim a third time in the Final.

At the start of the event, the existing World (WR) and Championships (CR) records were:

- WR: 2:06.62, Krisztina Egerszegi (Hungary), swum 25 August 1991 in Athens, Greece
- CR: 2:07.40, Cihong He (China), swum 11 September 1994 in Rome, Italy

== Results ==
=== Preliminaries ===
Rank	Heat + Lane	Swimmer	Nation	Time	Notes
1	H4 L5	Louise Ørnstedt	Denmark	2:11.52	q
1	H6 L4	Kirsty Coventry	Zimbabwe	2:11.52	q
3	H5 L5	Margaret Hoelzer	United States	2:11.74	q
4	H5 L4	Stanislava Komarova	Russia	2:11.84	q
5	H6 L3	Hanae Ito	Japan	2:12.67	q
6	H4 L4	Reiko Nakamura	Japan	2:12.87	q
7	H5 L2	Tayliah Zimmer	Australia	2:13.38	q
8	H5 L3	Katy Sexton	Great Britain	2:13.39	q
9	H6 L2	Hannah McLean	New Zealand	2:13.59	q
10	H4 L6	Iryna Amshennikova	Ukraine	2:13.62	q
11	H6 L6	Alessia Filippi	Italy	2:13.71	q
12	H3 L4	Jeri Moss	United States	2:13.76	q
13	H5 L6	Annika Liebs	Germany	2:13.78	q
14	H4 L3	Zhao Jing	China	2:13.85	q
15	H4 L7	Chen Yanyan	China	2:14.35	q
16	H5 L7	Duane Rocha	Spain	2:14.38	q
17	H6 L7	Melissa Corfe	South Africa	2:14.71	
18	H6 L8	Katarzyna Staszak	Poland	2:14.75	
19	H4 L1	Kelly Stefanyshyn	Canada	2:15.23	
20	H5 L8	Elizabeth Warden	Canada	2:15.46	
21	H5 L1	Melissa Ingram	New Zealand	2:16.48	
22	H2 L4	Gisela Morales	Guatemala	2:17.17	
23	H6 L1	Giaan Rooney	Australia	2:17.32	
24	H4 L2	Therese Svendsen	Sweden	2:17.43	
25	H3 L5	Kateryna Zubkova	Ukraine	2:17.48	
25	H6 L5	Alexandra Putra	France	2:17.48	
27	H3 L1	Sadan Derya Erke	Turkey	2:17.49	
28	H3 L2	Danit Kama	Israel	2:17.93	
29	H3 L8	Anja Čarman	Slovenia	2:18.61	
30	H4 L8	Yoo Jin Jung	South Korea	2:19.57	
31	H2 L6	Jane Kaljonen	Finland	2:19.67	
32	H3 L3	Anna Gostomelsky	Israel	2:19.83	
33	H3 L6	Man-Hsu Lin	Chinese Taipei	2:20.37	
34	H3 L7	Lenka Jarosova	Czech Republic	2:21.11	
35	H2 L5	Berit Aljand	Estonia	2:22.27	
36	H2 L2	Laura Rodriguez	Dominican Republic	2:27.78	
37	H2 L1	Valeria Silva	Peru	2:28.24	
38	H1 L6	Imane Boulaamane	Morocco	2:28.55	
39	H2 L7	Bernadette Lee	Singapore	2:30.60	
40	H1 L5	Saida Iskandarova	Uzbekistan	2:31.42	
41	H1 L2	Jonay Briedenhann	Namibia	2:32.64	
42	H1 L3	Weng I Kuan	Macau	2:33.05	
43	H2 L8	QUAH Ting Wen	Singapore	2:33.16	
44	H1 L1	Sussie Pineda	Honduras	2:41.02	
-	H2 L3	Yu Yon Kim	South Korea	DQ	
-	H1 L4	Kiera Aitken	Bermuda	DNS	
-	H1 L7	Mireille Hakimeh	Syria	DNS	

=== Semifinals ===
Rank	Heat + Lane	Swimmer	Nation	Time	Notes
1	S1 L4	Kirsty Coventry	Zimbabwe	2:09.88	
2	S1 L3	Reiko Nakamura	Japan	2:11.17	
3	S2 L5	Margaret Hoelzer	(United States) USA	2:11.32	
4	S1 L5	Stanislava Komarova	Russia	2:11.58	
5	S2 L4	Louise Ørnstedt	Denmark	2:11.59	
6	S2 L3	Hanae Ito	Japan	2:12.05	
7	S2 L7	Alessia Filippi	Italy	2:12.16	
8	S1 L1	Zhao Jing	China	2:12.55	
9	S2 L2	Hannah McLean	New Zealand	2:12.57	
10	S1 L2	Iryna Amshennikova	Ukraine	2:12.64	
11	S2 L1	Annika Liebs	Germany	2:13.35	
12	S1 L6	Katy Sexton	(United Kingdom) Great Britain	2:13.41	
13	S1 L7	Jeri Moss	(United States) USA	2:13.64	
14	S2 L6	Tayliah Zimmer	Australia	2:14.68	
15	S2 L8	Chen Yanyan	China	2:14.92	
16	S1 L8	Duane Rocha	Spain	2:16.50	

=== Final ===
Place	Lane	Swimmer	Nation	Time	Notes
1st place, gold medalist(s)	4	Kirsty Coventry	Zimbabwe	2:08.52	
2nd place, silver medalist(s)	3	Margaret Hoelzer	(United States) USA	2:09.94	
3rd place, bronze medalist(s)	5	Reiko Nakamura	Japan	2:10.41	
4	7	Hanae Ito	Japan	2:10.98	
5	1	Alessia Filippi	Italy	2:11.44	
6	6	Stanislava Komarova	Russia	2:12.03	
7	2	Louise Ørnstedt	Denmark	2:12.93	
8	8	Zhao Jing	China	2:13.10	
