= Swimming at the 2001 World Aquatics Championships – Women's 200 metre backstroke =

Women's 200 metre backstroke at the 2001 FINA World Championships
- Dates: 25 July 2001 (heats, semifinals); 26 July 2001 (final)
- Competitors: 33
- Winning time: 2:09.94

Medalists
| gold medal | Diana Mocanu | Romania |
| silver medal | Stanislava Komarova | Russia |
| bronze medal | Joanna Fargus | Great Britain |

The women's 200 metre backstroke event at the 2001 World Aquatics Championships took place 26 July. The heats and semifinals took place on 25 July, with the final being held on 26 July.

== Records ==
Prior to the competition, the existing world and championship records were as follows:

| World record | Krisztina Egerszegi (HUN) | 2:06.62 | Athens, Greece | 25 August 1991 |
| Championship record | He Cihong (CHN) | 2:07.40 | Rome, Italy | 11 September 1994 |

== Results ==
=== Heats ===
| Rank | Name | Nationality | Time | Notes |
|---|---|---|---|---|
| 1 | Diana Mocanu | Romania | 2:11.04 | Q |
| 2 | Joanna Fargus | United Kingdom | 2:11.16 | Q |
| 3 | Stanislava Komarova | Russia | 2:11.54 | Q |
| 4 | Clementine Stoney | Australia | 2:12.31 | Q |
| 5 | Jennifer Fratesi | Canada | 2:12.67 | Q |
| 6 | Antje Buschschulte | Germany | 2:12.88 | Q |
| 7 | Nicole Hetzer | Germany | 2:13.19 | Q |
| 8 | Reiko Nakamura | Japan | 2:13.31 | Q |
| 9 | Aya Terakawa | Japan | 2:13.84 | Q |
| 10 | Elizabeth Wycliffe | Canada | 2:14.97 | Q |
| 11 | Anu Koivisto | Finland | 2:15.01 | Q |
| 12 | Katy Sexton | United Kingdom | 2:15.04 | Q |
| 13 | Zhan Shu | China | 2:15.08 | Q |
| 14 | Jessica Aveyard | United States | 2:15.22 | Q |
| 15 | Valentina Brat | Romania | 2:15.32 | Q |
| 16 | Jamie Reid | United States | 2:15.38 | Q |
| 17 | Kelly Tucker | Australia | 2:15.55 | |
| 18 | Helen Nolfolk | New Zealand | 2:15.56 | |
| 19 | Alenka Kejžar | Slovenia | 2:16.31 | |
| 20 | Louise Ørnstedt | Denmark | 2:17.48 | |
| 21 | Nina Zhivanevskaya | Spain | 2:17.63 | |
| 22 | Ania Gustomelski | Israel | 2:18.36 | |
| 23 | Elena Efimenko | Uzbekistan | 2:23.90 | |
| 24 | Saida Iskandarova | Uzbekistan | 2:25.31 | |
| 25 | Wai Yen Sia | Malaysia | 2:26.16 | |
| 26 | Kuan Chia-Hsien | Chinese Taipei | 2:26.89 | |
| 27 | Yang Chin-Kuei | Chinese Taipei | 2:29.57 | |
| 28 | Khadisa Ciss | Senegal | 2:30.57 | |
| 29 | María Costanzo | Paraguay | 2:33.35 | |
| 30 | Shun Kwan Andrea Chum | Macau | 2:36.02 | |
| 31 | Denyse Tan | Singapore | 2:43.89 | |
| 32 | Yelena Rojkova | Turkmenistan | 2:48.73 | |
| – | Perla Martinez | Honduras | DSQ | |
| – | Ivana Gabrilo | Switzerland | DNS | |

=== Semifinals ===
| Rank | Name | Nationality | Time | Notes |
|---|---|---|---|---|
| 1 | Diana Mocanu | Romania | 2:10.59 | Q |
| 2 | Joanna Fargus | United Kingdom | 2:11.61 | Q |
| 3 | Jennifer Fratesi | Canada | 2:11.65 | Q |
| 4 | Nicole Hetzer | Germany | 2:11.69 | Q |
| 5 | Clementine Stoney | Australia | 2:12.05 | Q |
| 6 | Stanislava Komarova | Russia | 2:12.11 | Q |
| 7 | Aya Terakawa | Japan | 2:12.47 | Q |
| 8 | Antje Buschschulte | Germany | 2:12.78 | Q |
| 9 | Reiko Nakamura | Japan | 2:13.42 | |
| 10 | Katy Sexton | United Kingdom | 2:14.37 | |
| 11 | Jamie Reid | United States | 2:14.57 | |
| 12 | Jessica Aveyard | United States | 2:14.67 | |
| 13 | Zhan Shu | China | 2:15.31 | |
| 14 | Elizabeth Wycliffe | Canada | 2:15.38 | |
| 15 | Anu Koivisto | Finland | 2:15.64 | |
| 16 | Valentina Brat | Romania | 2:17.02 | |

=== Final ===
| Rank | Name | Nationality | Time | Notes |
|---|---|---|---|---|
| 1st place, gold medalist(s) | Diana Mocanu | Romania | 2:09.94 | |
| 2nd place, silver medalist(s) | Stanislava Komarova | Russia | 2:10.43 | |
| 3rd place, bronze medalist(s) | Joanna Fargus | United Kingdom | 2:11.05 | |
| 4 | Jennifer Fratesi | Canada | 2:11.16 | |
| 5 | Antje Buschschulte | Germany | 2:11.47 | |
| 6 | Clementine Stoney | Australia | 2:11.58 | |
| 7 | Nicole Hetzer | Germany | 2:11.68 | |
| 8 | Aya Terakawa | Japan | 2:14.12 | |
