= Swimming at the 2004 Summer Olympics – Women's 200 metre backstroke =

Women's 200 metre backstroke at the Games of the XXVIII Olympiad
- Venue: Athens Olympic Aquatic Centre
- Date: August 19, 2004 (heats & semifinals); August 20, 2004 (final)
- Competitors: 35 from 27 nations
- Winning time: 2:09.19 AF

Medalists
1st place, gold medalist(s)		Kirsty Coventry	Zimbabwe
2nd place, silver medalist(s)		Stanislava Komarova	Russia
3rd place, bronze medalist(s)		Reiko Nakamura	Japan
3rd place, bronze medalist(s)		Antje Buschschulte	Germany

The women's 200 metre backstroke event at the 2004 Olympic Games was contested at the Olympic Aquatic Centre of the Athens Olympic Sports Complex in Athens, Greece on August 19 and 20.

Zimbabwe's Kirsty Coventry added gold to her silver and bronze medals by a storming victory in this event, breaking an African record time of 2:09.19. Russia's Stanislava Komarova took home the silver at 2:09.72, while Japan's Reiko Nakamura and Germany's Antje Buschschulte shared their triumph for the bronze medal, in a joint time of 2:09.88. British swimmer and world champion Katy Sexton, on the other hand, finished outside the medals in seventh place, with a time of 2:12.11. Since Zimbabwe made its official debut in 1980, Coventry also became the nation's first athlete in its history to claim an individual Olympic medal.

== Records ==
Prior to this competition, the existing world and Olympic records were as follows.

World record	Krisztina Egerszegi (HUN)	2:06.62	Athens, Greece	25 August 1991
Olympic record	Krisztina Egerszegi (HUN)	2:07.06	Barcelona, Spain	31 July 1992

== Results ==
=== Heats ===
Rank	Heat	Lane	Name	Nationality	Time	Notes
1	4	4	Stanislava Komarova	Russia	2:10.71	Q
2	3	4	Reiko Nakamura	Japan	2:11.14	Q
3	3	1	Kirsty Coventry	Zimbabwe	2:12.49	Q
4	5	4	Margaret Hoelzer	United States	2:12.55	Q
5	4	6	Antje Buschschulte	Germany	2:12.96	Q
6	5	2	Jennifer Fratesi	Canada	2:13.00	Q
7	5	3	Louise Ørnstedt	Denmark	2:13.05	Q
8	3	5	Katy Sexton	Great Britain	2:13.25	Q
9	4	1	Hannah McLean	New Zealand	2:13.33	Q
10	4	5	Aya Terakawa	Japan	2:13.55	Q
11	3	2	Melissa Morgan	Australia	2:14.06	Q
12	2	2	Evelyn Verrasztó	Hungary	2:14.07	Q
13	5	6	Nicole Hetzer	Germany	2:14.42	Q
14	5	5	Iryna Amshennikova	Ukraine	2:14.49	Q
15	5	1	Frances Adcock	Australia	2:14.85	Q
16	4	8	Sanja Jovanović	Croatia	2:15.01	Q
17	4	2	Kristen Caverly	United States	2:15.34	
18	3	7	Elizabeth Warden	Canada	2:15.77	
19	2	6	Kateřina Pivoňková	Czech Republic	2:16.08	
20	4	3	Karen Lee	Great Britain	2:16.10	
21	3	8	Alessia Filippi	Italy	2:17.29	
21	2	7	Şadan Derya Erke	Turkey	2:17.29	
23	5	7	Anja Čarman	Slovenia	2:17.62	
24	2	1	Lin Man-hsu	Chinese Taipei	2:17.68	
25	2	5	Lee Da-hye	South Korea	2:17.73	
26	2	3	Gisela Morales	Guatemala	2:18.23	
27	5	8	Alexandra Putra	France	2:19.75	
28	1	4	Hiu Wai Sherry Tsai	Hong Kong	2:19.83	
29	2	8	Chonlathorn Vorathamrong	Thailand	2:21.11	
30	2	4	Eirini Karastergiou	Greece	2:21.93	
31	1	5	Gretchen Gotay Cordero	Puerto Rico	2:23.39	
32	1	3	Saida Iskandarova	Uzbekistan	2:26.17	
33	3	3	Zhan Shu	China	2:31.56	
	3	6	Chen Xiujun	China	DSQ	
	4	7	Alenka Kejžar	Slovenia	DNS	

=== Semifinals ===
==== Semifinal 1 ====
Rank	Lane	Name	Nationality	Time	Notes
1	4	Reiko Nakamura	Japan	2:10.14	Q
2	5	Margaret Hoelzer	United States	2:11.68	Q
3	2	Aya Terakawa	Japan	2:12.21	Q
4	6	Katy Sexton	Great Britain	2:12.62	Q
5	3	Jennifer Fratesi	Canada	2:12.64	
6	8	Sanja Jovanović	Croatia	2:13.76	
7	7	Evelyn Verrasztó	Hungary	2:13.98	
8	1	Iryna Amshennikova	Ukraine	2:14.83	

==== Semifinal 2 ====
Rank	Lane	Name	Nationality	Time	Notes
1	4	Stanislava Komarova	Russia	2:09.62	Q
2	5	Kirsty Coventry	Zimbabwe	2:10.04	Q, AF
3	3	Antje Buschschulte	Germany	2:10.66	Q
4	6	Louise Ørnstedt	Denmark	2:11.77	Q
5	2	Hannah McLean	New Zealand	2:12.87	
6	1	Nicole Hetzer	Germany	2:13.01	
7	7	Melissa Morgan	Australia	2:13.34	
8	8	Frances Adcock	Australia	2:15.69	

=== Final ===
Rank	Lane	Swimmer	Nation	Time	Notes
1st place, gold medalist(s)	5	Kirsty Coventry	Zimbabwe	2:09.19	AF
2nd place, silver medalist(s)	4	Stanislava Komarova	Russia	2:09.72	
3rd place, bronze medalist(s)	3	Reiko Nakamura	Japan	2:09.88	
3rd place, bronze medalist(s)	6	Antje Buschschulte	Germany	2:09.88	
5	2	Margaret Hoelzer	United States	2:10.70	
6	7	Louise Ørnstedt	Denmark	2:11.15	
7	8	Katy Sexton	Great Britain	2:12.11	
8	1	Aya Terakawa	Japan	2:12.90	
