= Swimming at the 2002 Commonwealth Games – Women's 50 metre backstroke =

Women's 50 metre backstroke at the 2002 Commonwealth Games
- Venue: Manchester Aquatics Centre
- Dates: 2–3 August 2002
- Competitors: 24 from 18 nations
- Winning time: 28.98

Medalists
gold medal	Dyana Calub	Australia
silver medal	Jennifer Carroll	Canada
bronze medal	Sarah Price	England

The women's 50 metre backstroke event at the 2002 Commonwealth Games was held on 2 to 3 August at the Manchester Aquatics Centre.

== Results ==
=== Heats ===
Rank	Heat	Lane	Name	Nationality	Time	Notes
1	4	5	Sarah Price	England	29.31	Q
2	3	4	Dyana Calub	Australia	29.33	Q
3	4	4	Jennifer Carroll	Canada	29.41	Q
4	2	4	Giaan Rooney	Australia	29.44	Q
5	2	5	Michelle Lischinsky	Canada	29.45	Q
6	3	5	Charlene Wittstock	South Africa	29.63	Q
7	3	2	Kirsty Coventry	Zimbabwe	29.68	Q
8	3	3	Hannah McLean	New Zealand	29.82	Q
9	4	3	Erin Gammel	Canada	29.83	Q
10	4	6	Katy Sexton	England	30.04	Q
11	4	2	Caroline Pickering	Fiji	30.34	Q
12	3	6	Rebecca Creedy	Australia	30.48	Q
13	2	2	Melissa Ingram	New Zealand	30.55	Q
14	2	3	Kiera Aitken	Bermuda	31.28	Q
15	3	7	Mariana Chuck	Jamaica	32.42	Q
16	2	1	Emily Crookall-Nixon	Isle of Man	32.87	Q
17	4	1	Andri Hadjiantoniou	Cyprus	32.93	
18	4	7	Gail Strobridge	Guernsey	33.10	
19	2	7	Tanya Anacleto	Mozambique	33.25	
20	3	1	Rachel Fortunato	Gibraltar	33.58	
21	1	4	Kiran Khan	Pakistan	35.00	
22	4	8	Nathalie Lee Baw	Mauritius	35.55	
23	1	3	Ursula Kuenzli	Zambia	38.25	
24	1	5	Olivia Nikitanda	Uganda	40.48	

=== Semifinals ===
Rank	Heat	Lane	Name	Nationality	Time	Notes
1	1	4	Dyana Calub	Australia	29.07	Q, GR
2	2	4	Sarah Price	England	29.13	Q
3	1	5	Giaan Rooney	Australia	29.15	Q
4	2	5	Jennifer Carroll	Canada	29.21	Q
5	2	3	Michelle Lischinsky	Canada	29.38	Q
6	2	6	Kirsty Coventry	Zimbabwe	29.43	Q
7	1	3	Charlene Wittstock	South Africa	29.46	Q
8	1	6	Hannah McLean	New Zealand	29.46	Q
9	1	2	Katy Sexton	England	29.69	
10	2	2	Erin Gammel	Canada	29.70	
11	1	7	Rebecca Creedy	Australia	30.26	
12	2	7	Caroline Pickering	Fiji	30.31	
13	2	1	Melissa Ingram	New Zealand	30.56	
14	1	1	Kiera Aitken	Bermuda	31.12	
15	1	8	Emily Crookall-Nixon	Isle of Man	32.53	
16	2	8	Mariana Chuck	Jamaica	32.57	

=== Final ===
Rank	Lane	Name	Nationality	Time	Notes
1st place, gold medalist(s)	4	Dyana Calub	Australia	28.98	GR
2nd place, silver medalist(s)	6	Jennifer Carroll	Canada	29.05	
3rd place, bronze medalist(s)	5	Sarah Price	England	29.08	
4	3	Giaan Rooney	Australia	29.11	
5	1	Charlene Wittstock	South Africa	29.18	
6	2	Michelle Lischinsky	Canada	29.30	
7	7	Kirsty Coventry	Zimbabwe	29.51	
8	8	Hannah McLean	New Zealand	29.64	
