= Swimming at the 2003 World Aquatics Championships =

The Swimming competition of the 10th FINA World Aquatics Championships consisted of 40 long course (50 m) events, swum July 20–27, 2003 in Barcelona, Spain. Swimming's 40 events were split evenly between men and women (20 each) and were:

- freestyle (free): 50, 100, 200, 400, 800 and 1500;
- backstroke (back): 50, 100 and 200;
- breaststroke (breast): 50, 100 and 200;
- butterfly (fly): 50, 100 and 200;
- Individual Medley (IM): 200 and 400; and
- relay: 4 × 100 and 4 × 200 freestyle, and 4 × 100 medley.

== Results ==
=== Men ===
Event	Gold		Silver		Bronze	
50 m free	Alexander Popov; Russia	21.92; CR	Mark Foster; Great Britain	22.20	Pieter van den Hoogenband; Netherlands	22.29
100 m free	Alexander Popov; Russia	48.42	Pieter van den Hoogenband; Netherlands	48.68	Ian Thorpe; Australia	48.77
200 m free	Ian Thorpe; Australia	1:45.14	Pieter van den Hoogenband; Netherlands	1:46.43	Grant Hackett; Australia	1:46.85
400 m free	Ian Thorpe; Australia	3:42.58	Grant Hackett; Australia	3:45.17	Dragoş Coman; Romania	3:46.87; NR
800 m free	Grant Hackett; Australia	7:43.82	Larsen Jensen; USA	7:48.09; AM	Igor Chervynskyi; Ukraine	7:53.15; NR
1500 m free	Grant Hackett; Australia	14:43.14	Igor Chervynskyi; Ukraine	15:01.04; NR	Erik Vendt; USA	15:01.28
50 m back	Thomas Rupprath; Germany	24.80; WR	Matt Welsh; Australia	25.01	Gerhard Zandberg; South Africa	25.07
100 m back	Aaron Peirsol; USA	53.61; CR	Arkady Vyatchanin; Russia; Matt Welsh; Australia	53.92	not awarded	
200 m back	Aaron Peirsol; USA	1:55.92	Gordan Kožulj; Croatia	1:57.47; NR	Simon Dufour; France	1:57.90
50 m breast	James Gibson; Great Britain	27.56	Oleg Lisogor; Ukraine	27.74	Mihály Flaskay; Hungary	27.79
100 m breast	Kosuke Kitajima; Japan	59.78; WR	Brendan Hansen; USA	1:00.21	James Gibson; Great Britain	1:00.37
200 m breast	Kosuke Kitajima; Japan	2:09.42; WR	Ian Edmond; Great Britain	2:10.92	Brendan Hansen; USA	2:11.11
50 m fly	Matt Welsh; Australia	23.43; WR	Ian Crocker; USA	23.62	Yevgeny Korotyshkin; Russia	23.73
100 m fly	Ian Crocker; USA	50.98; WR	Michael Phelps; USA	51.10	Andrei Serdinov; Ukraine	51.59; ER
200 m fly	Michael Phelps; USA	1:54.35	Takashi Yamamoto; Japan	1:55.52	Tom Malchow; USA	1:55.66
200 m IM	Michael Phelps; USA	1:56.04; WR	Ian Thorpe; Australia	1:59.66; OC	Massimiliano Rosolino; Italy	1:59.71
400 m IM	Michael Phelps; USA	4:09.09; WR	László Cseh; Hungary	4:10.79; ER	Oussama Mellouli; Tunisia	4:15.36; AF
4 × 100 m free relay	Russia; Andrei Kapralov; Ivan Usov; Denis Pimankov; Alexander Popov	3:14.06; CR, ER	USA; Scott Tucker; Neil Walker; Ryan Wochomurka; Jason Lezak	3:14.80	France; Romain Barnier; Julien Sicot; Fabien Gilot; Frédérick Bousquet	3:15.66; NR
4 × 200 m free relay	Australia; Grant Hackett; Craig Stevens; Nicholas Sprenger; Ian Thorpe	7:08.58	USA; Michael Phelps; Nate Dusing; Aaron Peirsol; Klete Keller	7:10.26; AM	Germany; Johannes Oesterling; Lars Conrad; Stefan Herbst; Christian Keller	7:14.02
4 × 100 m medley relay	USA; Aaron Peirsol; Brendan Hansen; Ian Crocker; Jason Lezak	3:31.54; WR	Russia; Arkady Vyatchanin; Roman Ivanovski; Igor Marchenko; Alexander Popov	3:34.72; ER	Japan; Tomomi Morita; Kosuke Kitajima; Takashi Yamamoto; Daisuke Hosokawa	3:36.12; AS

Legend: WR – World Record; CR – Championship Record

=== Women ===
Event	Gold		Silver		Bronze	
50 m free	Inge de Bruijn; Netherlands	24.47	Alice Mills; Australia	25.07	Libby Lenton; Australia	25.08
100 m free	Hanna-Maria Seppälä; Finland	54.37	Jodie Henry; Australia	54.58	Jenny Thompson; USA	54.65
200 m free	Alena Popchanka; Belarus	1:58.32	Martina Moravcová; Slovakia	1:58.44	Yang Yu; China	1:58.54
400 m free	Hannah Stockbauer; Germany	4:06.75	Éva Risztov; Hungary	4:07.24	Diana Munz; USA	4:07.67
800 m free	Hannah Stockbauer; Germany	8:23.66; CR	Diana Munz; USA	8:24.19	Rebecca Cooke; Great Britain	8:28.45
1500 m free	Hannah Stockbauer; Germany	16:00.18; CR, NR	Hayley Peirsol; USA	16:09.64	Jana Henke; Germany	16:10.13
50 m back	Nina Zhivanevskaya; Spain	28.48; CR	Ilona Hlaváčková; Czech Republic	28.50	Noriko Inada; Japan	28.62
100 m back	Antje Buschschulte; Germany	1:00.50	Louise Ørnstedt; Denmark; Katy Sexton; Great Britain	1:00.86	not awarded	
200 m back	Katy Sexton; Great Britain	2:08.74	Margaret Hoelzer; USA	2:09.24	Stanislava Komarova; Russia	2:10.17
50 m breast	Luo Xuejuan; China	30.67	Brooke Hanson; Australia	31.13	Zoë Baker; Great Britain	31.37
100 m breast	Luo Xuejuan; China	1:06.80	Amanda Beard; USA	1:07.42	Leisel Jones; Australia	1:07.47
200 m breast	Amanda Beard; USA	2:22.99 =WR	Leisel Jones; Australia	2:24.33; OC	Qi Hui; China	2:25.78
50 m fly	Inge de Bruijn; Netherlands	25.84; CR	Jenny Thompson; USA	26.00	Anna-Karin Kammerling; Sweden	26.06
100 m fly	Jenny Thompson; USA	57.96; CR	Otylia Jędrzejczak; Poland	58.22	Martina Moravcová; Slovakia	58.24
200 m fly	Otylia Jędrzejczak; Poland	2:07.56	Éva Risztov; Hungary	2:07.68	Yuko Nakanishi; Japan	2:08.08
200 m IM	Yana Klochkova; Ukraine	2:10.75	Alice Mills; Australia	2:12.75; OC	Zhou Yafei; China	2:12.92
400 m IM	Yana Klochkova; Ukraine	4:36.74	Éva Risztov; Hungary	4:37.39	Beatrice Câșlaru; Romania	4:41.86
4 × 100 m free relay	USA; Natalie Coughlin; Lindsay Benko; Rhi Jeffrey; Jenny Thompson	3:38.09	Germany; Petra Dallmann; Katrin Meissner; Antje Buschschulte; Sandra Völker	3:38.73	Australia; Libby Lenton; Elka Graham; Jodie Henry; Alice Mills	3:38.83; OC
4 × 200 m free relay	USA; Lindsay Benko; Rachel Komisarz; Rhi Jeffrey; Diana Munz	7:55.70; CR, AM	Australia; Elka Graham; Linda Mackenzie; Kirsten Thomson; Alice Mills	7:58.42; OC	China; Zhou Yafei; Xu Yanwei; Pang Jiaying; Yang Yu	7:58.53
4 × 100 m medley relay	China; Zhan Shu; Luo Xuejuan; Zhou Yafei; Yang Yu	3:59.89; CR, AS	USA; Natalie Coughlin; Amanda Beard; Jenny Thompson; Lindsay Benko	4:00.83	Australia; Giaan Rooney; Leisel Jones; Jessicah Schipper; Jodie Henry	4:01.37

Legend: WR – World Record; CR – Championship Record

=== Medal standings ===
* Host nation (Spain)

Rank	Nation	Gold	Silver	Bronze	Total
1	United States (USA)	11	12	5	28
2	Australia (AUS)	6	10	6	22
3	Germany (GER)	5	1	2	8
4	Russia (RUS)	3	2	2	7
5	China (CHN)	3	0	4	7
6	Great Britain (GBR)	2	3	3	8
7	Ukraine (UKR)	2	2	2	6
8	Netherlands (NED)	2	2	1	5
9	Japan (JPN)	2	1	3	6
10	Poland (POL)	1	1	0	2
11	Belarus (BLR)	1	0	0	1
11	Finland (FIN)	1	0	0	1
11	Spain (ESP)*	1	0	0	1
14	Hungary (HUN)	0	4	1	5
15	Slovakia (SVK)	0	1	1	2
16	Croatia (CRO)	0	1	0	1
16	Czech Republic (CZE)	0	1	0	1
16	Denmark (DEN)	0	1	0	1
19	France (FRA)	0	0	2	2
19	Romania (ROU)	0	0	2	2
21	Italy (ITA)	0	0	1	1
21	South Africa (RSA)	0	0	1	1
21	Sweden (SWE)	0	0	1	1
21	Tunisia (TUN)	0	0	1	1
Totals (24 entries)		40	42	38	120
