= Fu Hsiao-han =

Taiwanese swimmer

Personal information
- Full name: Fu Hsiao-han
- National team: Chinese Taipei
- Born: 14 September 1985 (age 40) Taipei, Taiwan
- Height: 1.62 m (5 ft 4 in)
- Weight: 54 kg (119 lb)

Sport
- Sport: Swimming
- Strokes: Backstroke

Fu Hsiao-han (Chinese: 傅筱涵; pinyin: Fu Xiǎohán; born September 14, 1985) is a Taiwanese former swimmer, who specialized in backstroke events. Fu qualified for the women's 100 m backstroke at the 2004 Summer Olympics in Athens, by achieving a FINA B-standard of 1:05.43 from the National University Games in Taipei. She challenged seven other swimmers in heat two, including 14-year-olds Anastassiya Prilepa of Kazakhstan and Olga Gnedovskaya of Uzbekistan. She raced to sixth place by a 2.25-second margin behind winner Kiera Aitken of Bermuda in 1:06.62. Fu failed to advance into the semifinals, as she placed thirty-seventh overall in the preliminaries.
