= Aljand =

Aljand is a surname. Notable people with the surname include:

- Berit Aljand (born 1985), Estonian swimmer
- Martti Aljand (born 1987), Estonian swimmer
- Triin Aljand (born 1985), Estonian swimmer, sister of Martti
