= Jennifer Carroll (swimmer) =

Canadian swimmer (born 1981)

Personal information
- Full name: Jennifer Carroll
- Nationality: Canadian
- Born: June 4, 1981 (age 45) Montreal, Quebec, Canada
- Height: 5 ft 6 in (1.68 m)
- Weight: 137 lb (62 kg)

Sport
- Sport: Swimming
- Strokes: Backstroke, Butterfly
Medal record
World Championships (SC)
Gold medal – first place	2002 Moscow	50 m backstroke
Commonwealth Games
Silver medal – second place	2002 Manchester	50 m backstroke
Universiade
Silver medal – second place	2005 İzmir	50 m backstroke
- Updated on 17 January 2014

Jennifer Carroll (born June 4, 1981) is a Canadian former swimmer.

== Career ==
Carroll was born in Montreal and first competed for Canada at the 2001 World Championships in Fukuoka, Japan, where she finished 18th in the 100 metre backstroke in 1:04.49 and 21st in the 50 metre backstroke in 30.02.

At the 2002 FINA World Swimming Championships (25 m) in Moscow, Carroll won gold in the 50 metre backstroke in a championships record time of 27.38. In the 100 metre backstroke, Carroll finished in 15th, posting a time of 29.03 in the semi-final.

At the 2002 Commonwealth Games in Manchester, Carroll won silver in the 50 metre backstroke in 29.05.

At the 2003 World Championships in Barcelona, Carroll finished 4th in the 50 metre backstroke in 28.65, 15th in the 100 metre backstroke in 1:03.08 and 22nd in the 50 metre butterfly in 28.25.

At the 2005 World Championships in Montreal, Carroll finished 18th in the 50 metre backstroke in 29.55, 34th in the 50 metre freestyle in 26.69 and 34th in the 50 metre butterfly in 28.33.

At the 2005 Summer Universiade in İzmir, Turkey, Carroll won silver in the 50 metre backstroke in 29.32, finished 8th in the 100 metre backstroke in 1:03.80 and with Kathleen Stoody, Erin Miller and Chanelle Charron-Watson finished 7th in the 4 × 100 metre medley relay in 4:15.49.

At the 2007 Summer Universiade in Bangkok, Thailand, Carroll finished 4th in the 50 metre backstroke in 29.20, 18th in the 50 metre butterfly in 27.94 and 19th in the 50 metre freestyle in 26.41.

At the 2008 FINA World Swimming Championships (25 m) in Manchester, Carroll finished 7th in the 50 metre backstroke in 27.37, 13th in the 50 metre butterfly in 26.65, 15th in the 100 metre backstroke in 59.86 and 20th in the 50 metre freestyle in 25.72.

At the 2009 Summer Universiade in Belgrade, Serbia, Carroll finished 9th in the 50 metre butterfly in 27.07, 11th in the 50 metre backstroke in 29.19 and 30th in the 50 metre freestyle in 26.56.

== Controversy ==
During the medal ceremony for the women's 50-metre backstroke at the 2002 Commonwealth Games, Carroll was observed waving the Quebec flag. Dave Johnson, Carroll's coach at the time, called for her suspension. Swimming Canada ultimately decided not to suspend Carroll, despite her violation of a signed agreement mandated by the Commonwealth Games Federation, which prohibits athletes from carrying provincial flags on the podium. Instead, in November, a disciplinary committee ordered Carroll to write a letter to her teammates and issue a formal apology to the board. Carroll stated that the gesture was not political but was merely a way to thank the people in her home province for their support.
