= Eirini Karastergiou =

Greek swimmer

Personal information
- Full name: Eirini Karastergiou
- National team: Greece
- Born: 20 November 1982 (age 43) Lamia, Sterea Ellada, Greece
- Height: 1.73 m (5 ft 8 in)
- Weight: 63 kg (139 lb)

Sport
- Sport: Swimming
- Strokes: Backstroke
- Club: ANC Glyfada

Eirini Karastergiou (Greek: Ειρήνη Καραστεργίου; born November 20, 1982) is a Greek former swimmer, who specialized in backstroke events. She previously held two Greek records in both 100 and 200 m backstroke, until they were all broken each by Aspasia Petradaki and Stella Boumi in 2009.

Karastergiou qualified for two swimming events at the 2004 Summer Olympics in Athens, representing the host nation Greece. She cleared FINA B-standard entry times of 1:03.26 (100 m backstroke) and 2:14.82 (200 m backstroke) from the Greek Open in Piraeus. In the 100 m backstroke, Karastergiou challenged seven other swimmers in heat three, including top medal favorite Kirsty Coventry of Zimbabwe. She edged out Finland's Hanna-Maria Seppälä to take a seventh spot and thirty-third overall by a quarter of a second (0.25) in 1:05.30. In the 200 m backstroke, Karastergiou placed thirtieth in the morning prelims. Swimming in heat two, she rounded out a field of eight swimmers to last place by less than 0.18 of a second behind Thailand's Chonlathorn Vorathamrong in 2:21.93.
