= Lenient Obia =

Nigerian swimmer

Personal information
- Full name: Lenient Obia
- National team: Nigeria
- Born: 1 August 1977 (age 48)
- Height: 1.57 m (5 ft 2 in)
- Weight: 55 kg (121 lb)

Sport
- Sport: Swimming
- Strokes: Backstroke

Lenient Obia (born 1 August 1977) is a Nigerian former swimmer, who specialized in backstroke events. Obia qualified for the women's 100 m backstroke at the 2004 Summer Olympics in Athens, by receiving a Universality place from FINA, in an entry time of 1:09.69. She topped the first heat against Honduras' Ana Galindo and Turkmenistan's Yelena Rojkova in 1:09.95, just 0.26 of a second off her entry time. Obia failed to advance into the semifinals, as she placed thirty-ninth overall in the preliminaries.
