= Ana Galindo (swimmer) =

Honduran swimmer (born 1987)

Personal information
- Full name: Ana Sofia Galindo
- National team: Honduras
- Born: 8 February 1987 (age 39) Tegucigalpa, Honduras
- Height: 1.70 m (5 ft 7 in)
- Weight: 58 kg (128 lb)

Sport
- Sport: Swimming
- Strokes: Backstroke
- Club: Acuático Bantral
- Coach: Carlos Menéndez

Ana Sofia Galindo (born February 8, 1987) is a Honduran swimmer, who specialized in backstroke events. As part of her preparations in international tournaments, she is a member of Bantral Aquatic Club, and is coached and trained by Carlos Menéndez.

Galindo qualified for the women's 100 m backstroke at the 2004 Summer Olympics in Athens, by receiving a Universality place from FINA, in an entry time of 1:12.30. She participated in heat one against two other swimmers Lenient Obia of Nigeria, and Yelena Rojkova of Turkmenistan. Galindo posted a lifetime best of 1:11.80 to take a second spot behind Obia by a 1.85-second margin. Galindo failed to advance into the semifinals, as she placed fortieth overall in the preliminaries.
