= Anastassiya Prilepa =

Kazakhstani swimmer

Personal information
- Full name: Anastasiya Sergeyevna Prilepa
- Nickname: fastfish
- National team: Kazakhstan
- Born: 15 March 1990 (age 36) Almaty, Kazakh SSR, Soviet Union
- Height: 1.61 m (5 ft 3 in)
- Weight: 47 kg (104 lb)

Sport
- Sport: Swimming
- Strokes: Backstroke

Anastasiya Sergeyevna Prilepa (also Anastassiya Prilepa, Kazakh: Анастасия Сергеевна Прилепа; born March 15, 1990) is a Kazakh swimmer, who specialized in backstroke events. She is a multiple-time Kazakhstan champion in all backstroke distances, and holds two titles at the Asian Age Group Championships.

Prilepa qualified for the women's 100 m backstroke, as Kazakhstan's youngest swimmer (aged 14), at the 2004 Summer Olympics in Athens. She cleared a FINA B-standard entry time of 1:05.43 from the Kazakhstan Open Championships in Almaty. She challenged seven other swimmers in heat two, including Uzbekistan's Olga Gnedovskaya, who shared the same age with Prilepa. She raced to seventh place by a 3.18-second margin behind winner Kiera Aitken of Bermuda in 1:07.55. Prilepa failed to advance into the semifinals, as she placed thirty-eighth overall in the preliminaries.
