= Hannah McLean =

New Zealand swimmer (born 1981)

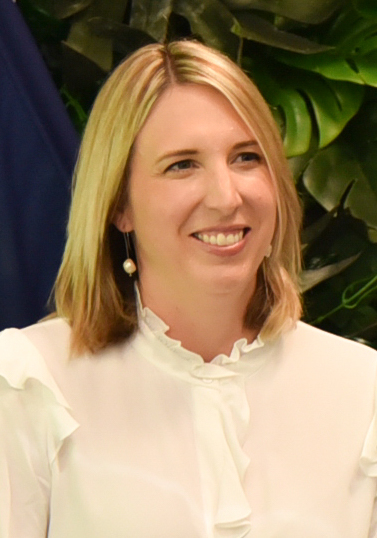
- McLean in 2020

Personal information
- Nationality: New Zealand
- Born: 1 July 1981 (age 45) London, England

Sport
- Sport: Swimming
- Event: Backstroke
- Club: North Shore Swimming Club
- Coached by: Brett Green, Jan Cameron, Igor Polianski, Thomas Ansorg
Medal record
Women's swimming
Representing New Zealand
Commonwealth Games
Bronze medal – third place	2006 Melbourne	200m backstroke
World Championships (SC)
Bronze medal – third place	2006 Shanghai	200 m Backstroke

Hannah McLean (born 1 July 1981 in London, England) is a former competitive swimmer for New Zealand. During her career she won medals in the 200 metre backstroke at the Commonwealth Games and World Short Course Championships, set Commonwealth Games record and competed at the 2004 Olympic Games.

McLean was educated in Auckland at Epsom Girls Grammar and King's College and graduated from the University of Auckland with a Bachelor of Arts in English.

== Swimming career ==
McLean first raced for New Zealand at the 1998 FINA Swimming World Cup during the stop at Hong Kong, where the sixteen year old was part of a strong contingent of New Zealand swimmers including fellow young swimmers Lydia Lipscombe and Helen Norfolk who were amongst the backstroke medals as McLean grabbed two 5th-place finishes in the 50 metre backstroke and 100 metre backstroke, and an 8th-place finish in the 200 metre backstroke.

In the lead up to the 2000 Summer Olympics, McLean narrowly missed the qualifying mark by 0.17.

At the 2002 FINA Swimming World Cup, McLean won the bronze medal in the 200 metre backstroke in a time of 2:13.07 ahead of compatriot Melissa Ingram, a second bronze in the 100 metre backstroke in a time of 1:02.02 and finished 4th in the 50 metre backstroke.

During her career, McLean won further medals in backstroke at World Cup meets including a bronze in the 100m backstroke in Australian in 2003, silver in the 100 metre backstroke and 200 metre backstroke, bronze in the 50 metre and 200 metre backstroke in 2004 during the Australian and South African stops in 2004.

=== 2002 Commonwealth Games ===
The 2002 Commonwealth Games in Manchester served as the senior international breakthrough for 21 year old McLean as she claimed some valuable finals appearances. Her performances were highlighted with a 6th-place finish in the 100 metre backstroke in a time of 1:02.91, 8th-place finish in the 50 metre backstroke in a time of 28.21, and 10th-place finish in the 200 metre backstroke in a time of 2:15.11. She also raced in the 50 metre butterfly but did not progress into the semi-finals.

=== 2002 Pan Pacific championships ===
Backing up from the Commonwealth Games, McLean competed at the 2002 Pan Pacific Swimming Championships with an 7th-place finish in the final of the 200 metre backstroke in a time of 2:14.74 and an 8th-place finish in the final of the 100 metre backstroke in a time of 1:03.28. McLean was part of the 4x100 metre freestyle and 4x100 metre medley relays which both finished 5th. She also raced the 50 metre freestyle but did not progress into the semi-finals.

=== 2003 World championships ===
At the 2003 World Aquatics Championships in Barcelona, McLean made the semi-finals of the 200 metre backstroke with a 10th-place finish in a time of 2:13.39, 12th-place finish in the 100 metre backstroke in a time of 1:02.47 and 15th-place finish in the 50 metre backstroke in a time of 29.36. McLean also raced in the 50m freestyle and was part of the New Zealand 4x200 metre freestyle relay that was disqualified.

=== 2004 Olympics ===
McLean qualified for the 2004 Summer Olympics at the 2004 New Zealand Championships in the heats if the 100 m backstroke with a personal best time of 1:01.55. She would go onto qualify in the 200m backstroke additionally at the meet. At the games, McLean missed out on the final by 0.25 after finishing 5th in the semi-final of the 200 metre backstroke in a time of 2:12.87. She did not progress into the semi-finals her favored 100 metre backstroke after swimming a 1:03.09. McLean struggled with the sunlight in the open pool at the Athens Olympic Aquatic Centre, crashing into the lane ropes several times during the 100 metre backstroke contributing to a slower time. She was also part of the 4x100 metre medley relay team that finished 13th.

=== 2005 World championships ===
Two years later at the 2005 World Aquatics Championships in Montreal, McLean became the first New Zealander in seven years to qualify for an individual final at world championships when she finished 5th in the final of the 100 metre backstroke in a time of 1:01.16. McLean also made the final of the 50 metre backstroke where she finished 7th in the final in a time of 28.90. She narrowley missed out of the final of the 200 metre backstroke finishing 0.02 behind Zhao Jing of China. McLean was part of the 4x100 metre freestyle team that finished 8th in the final and the 4x100 metre medley team that did not progress to the final.

=== 2006 Commonwealth Games ===
McLean won a bronze medal in the 200 meter backstroke at the 2006 Commonwealth Games held in Melbourne in a time of 2:12.47. She also claimed two 4th-place finishes in the 50 metre backstroke in a time of 28.89 and the 100 metre backstroke in a time of 1:01.71. McLean took part in both the 4x100 metre freestyle and 4x100 metre medley relay teams that both finished 4th. During the 4x100 metre medley relay, McLean swum a 1:00.83 in the backstroke leg to break the games record which she held until 2010 when broken by Emily Seebohm. The time was a new New Zealand record and was faster than the individual gold medal-winning time of Sophie Edington who had earlier set the games record at 1:00.93.

=== 2006 World championships ===
Following on from the Commonwealth Games, McLean claimed a further international bronze medal at the 2006 FINA World Swimming Championships (25 m) in Shanghai. Racing in the 200 metre backstroke, McLean swum a 2:06.96 to finish behind Margaret Hoelzer and Tayliah Zimmer in the final, while she finished 4th in the 100 metre backstroke in a time of 59.00 and 5th in the 50 metre backstroke in a time of 27.76.

Performing well in the 25 metre pool, McLean set new New Zealand records in the 50 metre, 100 metre and 200 metre backstroke, notably becoming the first New Zealand women under 59 seconds during the heats of the 100 metre backstroke and breaking Anna Simcic's New Zealand record that had stood for fourteen years which at the time was the world record.

Following her performances at the Commonwealth Games and World Championships, McLean was nominated as Sportswoman of the Year at the 2006 Halberg awards that was won by Commonwealth Games teammate Valerie Vili.

McLean retired from competitive swimming in 2006.
