= Serrana Fernández =

Uruguayan swimmer (born 1973)

Personal information
- Full name: Serrana Andrea Fernández La Banca
- Nationality: Uruguay
- Born: November 13, 1973 (age 52)

Sport
- Sport: Swimming
- Strokes: Backstroke

Serrana Andrea Fernández la Banca (born November 13, 1973) is an Olympic backstroke swimmer from Uruguay. She competed at the 2000 and 2004 Olympics, where she was flagbearer for Uruguay in the Opening Ceremony.

Since 2007 she lives in Spain (Alicante).

She swam at the 1991 and 2003 Pan American Games.

As of July 2009, she still holds the Uruguay Records in all 3 long-course backstroke events at:

- 50 back: 29.81
- 100 back: 1:04.99
- 200 back: 2:24.41.

Olympic Games
Preceded by Mónica Falcioni	Flagbearer for Uruguay; Athens 2004	Succeeded by Alejandro Foglia
