= Chen Yanyan (swimmer) =

Chinese swimmer (born 1985)

Chang Qing
Personal information
- National team: China
- Born: April 5, 1985 (age 41) Changsha, Hunan, China

Sport
- Sport: Swimming
Medal record
Representing China
Summer Universiade
Silver medal – second place	2007 Bangkok	4x100m freestyle relay
Bronze medal – third place	2007 Bangkok	100m backstroke

Chen Yanyan (Chinese: 陈燕燕; born 5 April 1985 in Changsha, Hunan) is a Chinese swimmer, who competed for Team China at the 2008 Summer Olympics.

She is the younger sister of synchronized swimmer Chen Xuan.

== Major achievements ==
- 2002/2003 National Champions Tournament - 4th 50 m free/1st 4×100 m medley relay;
- 2003 National Championships - 2nd 200 m back;
- 2003 National Intercity Games - 3rd 200 m back
