= Hanae Ito =

Japanese swimmer (born 1985)

Hanae Ito OLY
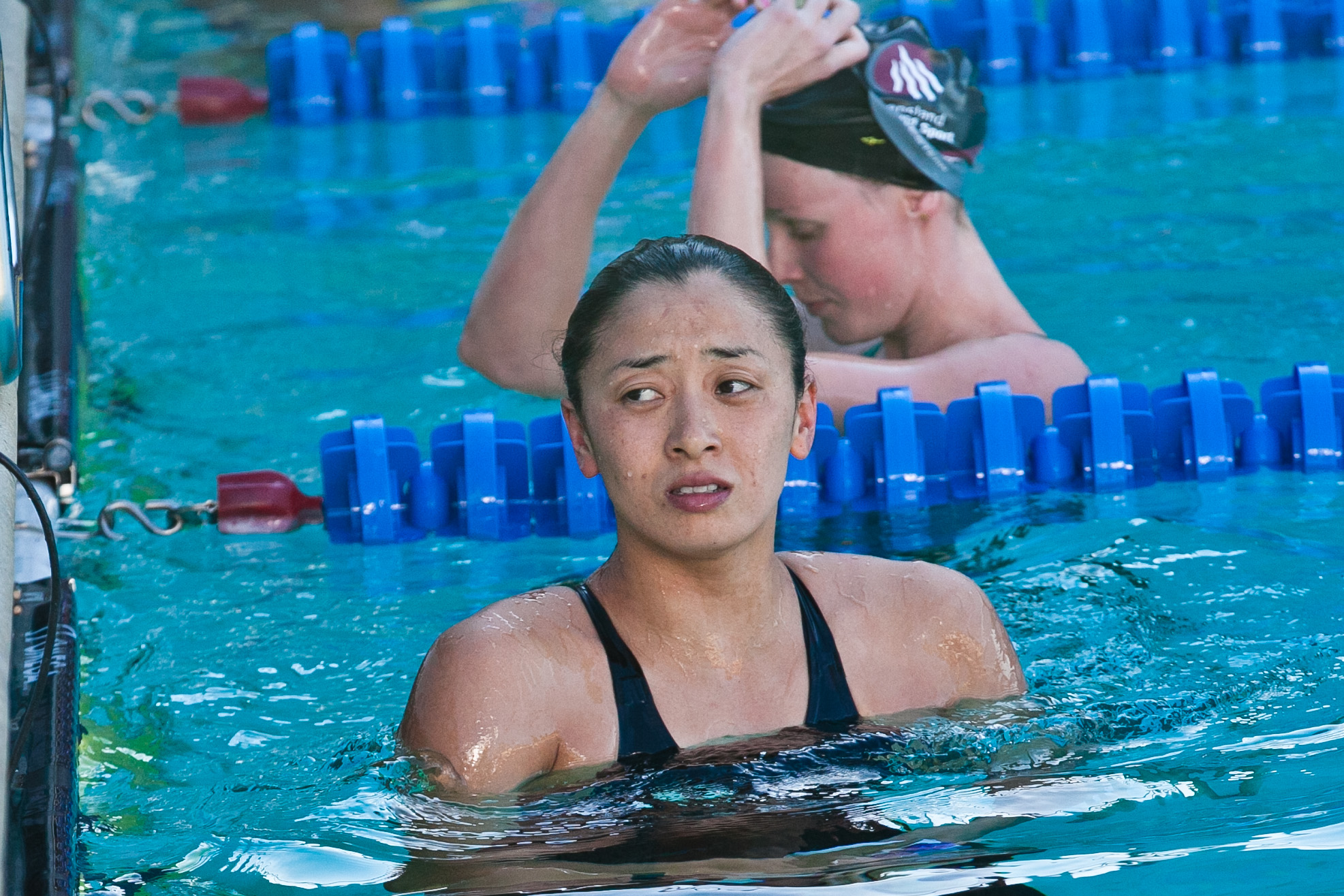

Personal information
- Nationality: Japan
- Born: January 18, 1985 (age 41)
- Height: 174 cm (5 ft 9 in)
- Weight: 62 kg (137 lb)

Sport
- Sport: Swimming
- Strokes: backstroke
- Club: Central Sports
Medal record
Pan Pacific Championships
Gold medal – first place	2006 Victoria	100m backstroke

Hanae Ito (伊藤 華英, Itō Hanae; born January 18, 1985 in Ōmiya) is a Japanese backstroke swimmer.

== Major achievements ==
- 2005 World Championships – 100m backstroke 6th (1:01.95)
- 2006 Pan Pacific Swimming Championships – 100m backstroke 1st (1:00.63)
- 2008 Beijing Olympics – 100m backstroke 8th (1:00.16)

== Personal bests ==
In long course

- 100m backstroke: 59.83 (Apr 17, 2008)

In short course

- 200m backstroke: 2:03.01 Asian, Japanese Record (February 21, 2009)

== See also ==
- Reiko Nakamura
- Aya Terakawa
