= Derya Erke =

Turkish swimmer (1983–2025)

Personal information
- Full name: Şadan Derya Erke
- National team: Turkey
- Born: 11 November 1983 Istanbul, Turkey
- Died: 27 February 2025 (aged 41) Istanbul, Turkey
- Height: 1.63 m (5 ft 4 in)
- Weight: 59 kg (130 lb)

Sport
- Sport: Swimming
- Strokes: Backstroke
- Club: İstanbul Yüzme İhtisas Kulübü

Şadan Derya Erke (11 November 1983 – 27 February 2025) was a Turkish swimmer, who specialized in backstroke events. She was a two-time Olympian (2000 and 2004) and a member of Istanbul Swimming Club (Turkish: İstanbul Yüzme İhtisas Kulübü). She previously held Turkish records in the 50, 100, and 200 m backstroke, until they were all broken by Hazal Sarikaya in 2012. Erke was also a graduate of Marmara University in Istanbul.

Erke made her first Turkish team, as a 16-year-old teen, at the 2000 Summer Olympics in Sydney. There, she failed to reach the semifinals in any of her individual events, finishing forty-second in the 100 m backstroke (1:07.26), and twenty-ninth in the 200 m backstroke (2:21.28).

At the 2004 Summer Olympics in Athens, Erke maintained her program on her second Olympic appearance, competing again in the 100 and 200 m backstroke. She posted FINA B-standard entry times of 1:04.28 (100 m backstroke) and 2:19.11 (200 m backstroke) from the European Championships in Madrid, Spain. In the 100 m backstroke, Erke challenged six other swimmers in heat two, including 14-year-olds Anastassiya Prilepa of Kazakhstan and Olga Gnedovskaya of Uzbekistan. She raced to third place and thirty-fourth overall by 0.23 of a second behind Thailand's Chonlathorn Vorathamrong with a time of 1:05.38. In the 200 m backstroke, Erke shared a twenty-first place tie with Italy's Alessia Filippi from the morning's preliminaries. Swimming in the same heat as her first, she posted a lifetime best of 2:17.29 to claim another third spot by a 3.22-second margin behind winner Evelyn Verrasztó of Hungary.

Erke died of cancer in Istanbul, on 27 February 2025, at the age of 41. Her body was removed from Ortaköy Büyük Mecidiye Mosque and buried in the family graveyard in Ortaköy Cemetery.
