= Katy Sexton =

British swimmer

Katy Sexton (Sexton-Hovey)
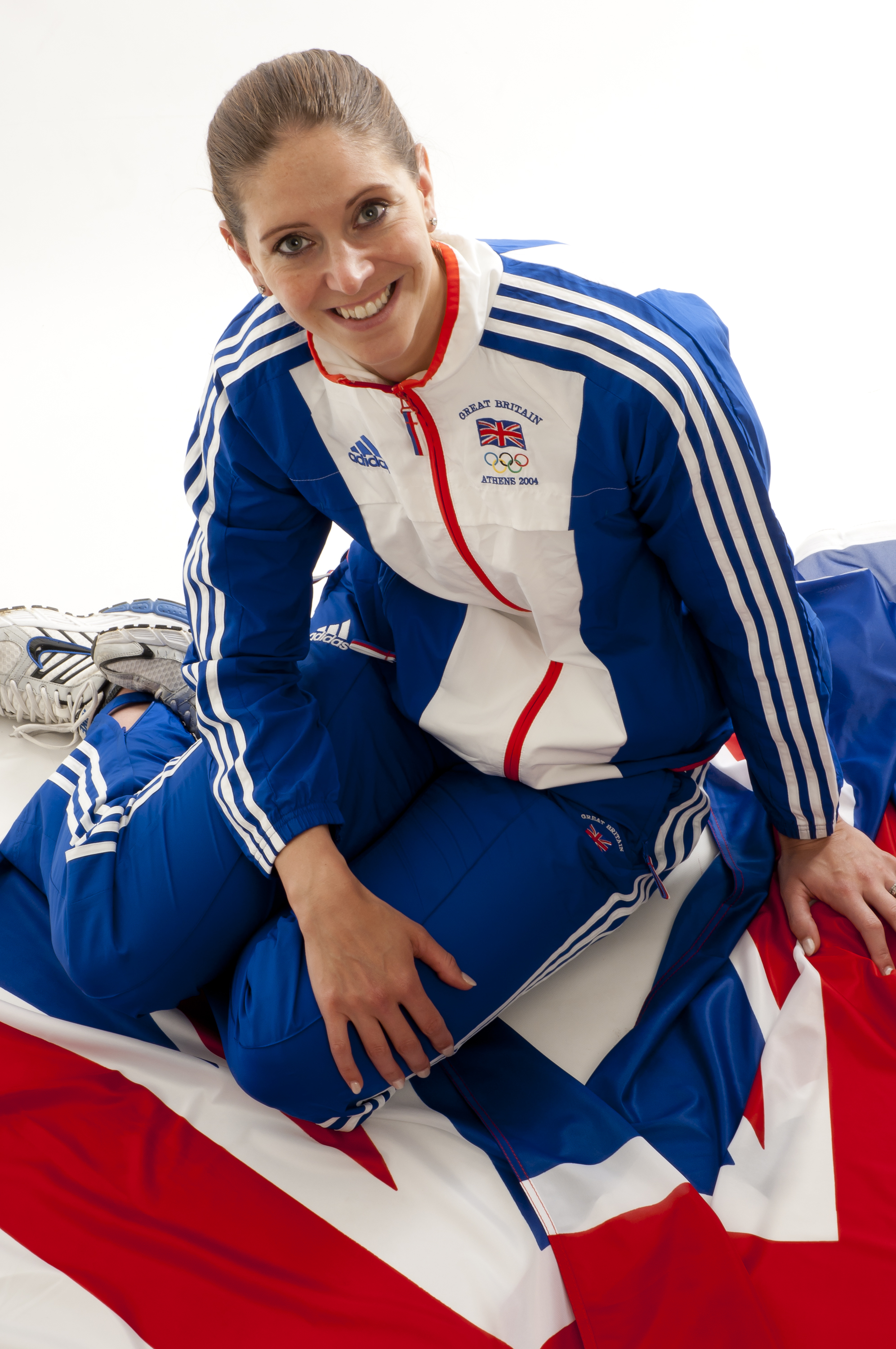

Personal information
- Nationality: British
- Born: 21 June 1982 (age 44) Portsmouth, UK
- Height: 1.80 m (5 ft 11 in)
- Weight: 65 kg (143 lb; 10.2 st)
- Spouse: Scott Hovey

Sport
- Sport: Backstroke
- Club: Portsmouth Northsea SC

Achievements and titles
- Personal bests: 100 m back LC: 1:00.49; 200 m back LC: 2:08.74
Medal record
Women's swimming
Representing Great Britain
World Championships - Long Course
Gold medal – first place	2003 Barcelona	200 m backstroke
Silver medal – second place	2003 Barcelona	100 m backstroke
European Championships - Long Course
Bronze medal – third place	1999 Istanbul	4×50 m medley
European Championships - Short Course
Silver medal – second place	2000 Valencia	100 m backstroke
Bronze medal – third place	1999 Lisbon	4×50 m medley
Representing England
Commonwealth Games
Gold medal – first place	1998 Kuala Lumpur	200 m backstroke
Bronze medal – third place	2002 Manchester	200 m backstroke

Katy Sexton, MBE (born 21 June 1982) is a former Olympic swimmer from Great Britain. She became the first British swimmer to win a World Championship title, when she won the Women's 200m Back at the 2003 World Championships. She is twice an Olympian and has represented Great Britain in four World Championships, the first in 1998 when she was 16, and in three Commonwealth Games. She was given the MBE for services to swimming in the 2004 New Year Honours list.

== Early life ==
Katy was born in Portsmouth. She attended Springfield School from 1994 to 1998. It was there that she learned to swim and where she returned to train for Olympic trials in early 2012, but can remember splashing around in pools when she was about three years old. Katy began her career by coming third in the European Youth Olympics in 1995. She had the desire and motivation to succeed at an even higher level with a grueling daily schedule of early morning training (5.30-7.30am), school and then training again for 2 hours in the evening. This helped Katy prepare for the Olympic Games.

Sexton first appeared on the senior scene at the age of 15 with her first taste of what it was all about being the youngest member of the GB World Championship team in Perth, Australia in 1998.

== International career ==
=== 1997 ===
Having broken various British junior records in this year, and finishing second in the 100m backstroke at European juniors, Katy was selected to represent Great Britain at senior level for the first time.

=== 1998 ===
In this year Katy competed at the senior World Championships in Perth for the first time, having been let off from school to do so. Following this, there was the Swimming World Cup where Sexton broke 5 British junior records.

But by far and away her biggest achievement this year was when she competed at the 1998 Commonwealth Games held at Kuala Lumpur and winning the 200m backstroke title at the age of 16 in a time of 2:13.18

=== 1999 ===
World Short Course in Hong Kong where she swam backstroke in the medley team where they broke the British record. Competed at the European Long Course Championships held in Istanbul just missing out on a medal in the 200m backstroke by 0.2 of a second. Sexton did gain a bronze in the 4 × 100 m medley relay along with Zoe Baker, Sue Rolph and Karen Pickering. Competed at the European Short Course Championships held at Lisbon. Once again Katy came fourth in the individual 100m backstroke and broke the British record once again in the 4x50m medley relay. Became the ASA National British Championships 50 metres backstroke champion and the 100 metres backstroke champion.

=== 2000 ===
Broke British record in the 200m backstroke in a time of 2:13.00 at the US Nationals in Seattle. On 16 April, Sexton's club side, Portsmouth Northsea Swimming Club, won the Speedo League final at Coventry. In this year, Katy qualified for the Olympics for the first time in Sydney. In the 100m backstroke she narrowly missed the final finishing in equal 10th overall. In the 4 × 100 m medley relay the GB team finished 7th in the final once again breaking the British record. Competed at the European Short Course Championships held at Valencia winning a silver medal in the 100m backstroke in a time of 1:00.04. Retained 100 metres backstroke British title.

=== 2001 ===
Competed in the Swimming World Cup in Sheffield breaking the British record for the 200m backstroke with a time of 2:08.13. In the Long Course World Championships in Fukuoka Katy made the semi-finals in both the 100m and 200m backstroke. On 19 September Katy woke with a stabbing pain in her back. Diagnosis by the Team GB doctors revealed brachial neuritis, also known as Parsonage–Turner syndrome. As a consequence, Sexton was out of competitive action for 6 months, but continued to train in the water just using legs only.

=== 2002 ===
Competed at the 2002 Commonwealth Games held at Manchester, where she finished third behind Sarah Price in the 200m backstroke.

=== 2003 ===
At the British Trials on 20 March 2003, Katy Sexton shattered the Commonwealth record to book her place at the World Championships in 1min 00.49sec, the sixth fastest ever at that time. Sexton, who was then coached by Chris Nesbitt in Portsmouth, had a previous best before the championships of 1min 01.80sec. Naturally, she was overjoyed: "O my God! I'm not going to sleep tonight," she said. "I knew I was capable of doing a good time but had no idea I'd go that fast." She put her new found speed down to the weight-training she has introduced to her programme since the Commonwealth Games in Manchester the previous year and the three-weeks training at Britain's official offshore training camp on the Gold Coast in Australia. "That definitely helped," she said.

At the World Championships, in the Women's 100m backstroke in a closely fought final it was German Antje Buschschulte who touched the pads in 1:00.50, with Denmark's Louise Ornstedt and Katy Sexton in a tie for silver in 1:00.86

In the Women's 200m backstroke Seventeen year-old Russian Stanislava Komarova looked the pre-race favorite in this race, having swum a PR 2:09.39 to be fastest qualifier. However, Great Britain's Katy Sexton had been just a little faster this year with a 2:09.27.The young Russian looked comfortable at the second turn, leading from Ukrainian Iryna Amshennikova with Sexton third. At the third turn Komarova still had her head in front, but it was Margaret Hoelzer moving up to second place (just 0.07 seconds behind), the Ukrainian third and Sexton next. As is often the case, the main action happens in the last fifty. Komorova was struggling and Sexton was powering home as Hoelzer also moved past the Russian. At the wall Sexton touched first, giving Great Britain its first women's gold in a NR 2:08.74 (7th all-time performer). Hoelzer took the silver in a PR 2:09.24 with Komarova holding on for the bronze in a disappointing 2:10.17. Regained 100 metres backstroke British title and won first 200 metres backstroke title.

=== 2004 ===
2004 was an Olympic year with 2004 Summer Olympics in Athens. Going into the Games, both the 100m backstroke and the 200m backstroke were considered fairly open and up for grabs by a number of swimmers, including Katy. In the 200m final, Sexton finished 7th with a time of 2.12.11. Fourth 100 metres backstroke British title and second 200 metres backstroke title.

=== 2005 ===
Having qualified for the 2005 World Aquatics Championships in Montreal, Katy Sexton and James Gibson were the individuals who were aiming to defend their crowns. In the 200m final, Katy finished eighth in 2:13.39.

=== 2006 ===
Competed at the Commonwealth Games held at Melbourne where Katy made 3 finals; in the 50m, 100m and 200m backstroke. Fifth 100 metres backstroke British title. Sexton made the European Long Course in Budapest this year. It was at the end of this year that Katy started training with Mark Foster. Regained 50 metres backstroke British title.

=== 2007 ===
European Short Course in Debrecen, Hungary where she made two finals breaking the British senior record in the 50m backstroke in 27:99. Sixth 100 metres backstroke British title and third 50 metres title.

=== 2008 ===
Katy just missed out on the Beijing Olympics, when she finished 3rd at the British trials behind Gemma Spofforth and Elizabeth Simmonds.

=== 2012 ===
At the age of 29, Katy attempted to qualify for the London 2012 Olympics at 200m backstroke.

== Masters career ==
Sexton competed in K2 in Crawley for the South East Regionals Masters Championships in 2013, where she claimed double gold at the event. Her victory in the 50m backstroke in a time of 29.84secs broke her own British and European records. She also went close to setting a new British record in her 50m freestyle win at 27.23secs.

'To break the British and European record I set last year was pretty cool,’ said Sexton, who hadn’t raced in six months.'I haven’t actually retired full-time from the pool, I’m more in semi-retirement. So I thought I’d compete in the Masters, which is nice and relaxed, and without too much pressure.

At the Marlin's Masters meet in Medina on the Isle of Wight, on 8 February 2014, Katy broke two British records for a masters race. In the 50m butterfly she knocked nearly 2 seconds off the record with a time of 29.91 sec. In the 50m freestyle she achieved a time of 26.50 sec.

== Coaching career ==
Katy is determined to give something back to the Portsmouth community that supported her so well during her competitive days.Through the Katy Sexton Swim Academy, which she founded in 2010, she teaches and inspires the next generation of swimmers. Sexton says, "It’s not something I’ve just put my name on - I’m actually hands on with it." Based in Havant, it has more than 300 recruits, with the former Portsmouth Northsea member hoping to unearth one or two stars of the future. She also mentors up and coming sportsmen and women from around the South Coast. Working further afield, Katy works with her fellow Olympian, good friend and former world champion at the Mark Foster Swimming Academy.

In 2011, Sexton was appointed an ambassador of the Swimming Teachers' Association (STA). Tasked with promoting water safety education and to raise awareness about the importance of learning to swim, she represents the STA at key events and provides technical expertise to its 6500 members through continuous professional development courses.

Jasmine Blofield, President of Junior Chamber International Portsmouth says, 'Katy's passion, ambition and determination makes her the perfect person share her inspirations and ideas on how we can all drive ourselves to perform at our best and achieve our goals, both personal and professional.'

== Charity work ==
Driven by her own experiences of depression, Sexton is a patron to Off The Record, a counselling service for 11 to 25-year-olds.

Sexton also regularly takes part in charity events in the local area; she recently took part a charity swimming race, where she went head-to-head in a 100m race in the swimming pool of Springfield School in aid of Comic Relief

== See also ==
- List of World Aquatics Championships medalists in swimming (women)
