= Antje Buschschulte =

German swimmer (born 1978)

Personal information
- Nationality: Germany
- Born: 27 December 1978 (age 47) West Berlin, West Germany
- Height: 1.86 m (6 ft 1 in)

Sport
- Sport: Swimming
- Strokes: Freestyle, Backstroke
- Club: Sportclub Magdeburg
Medal record
Women's swimming
Representing Germany
Event	1st	2nd	3rd
Olympic Games	0	0	5
World Championships (LC)	2	5	3
World Championships (SC)	2	2	1
European Championships (LC)	6	3	4
European Championships (SC)	11	12	2
Total	21	21	15
Olympic Games
Bronze medal – third place	1996 Atlanta	4 × 100 m freestyle
Bronze medal – third place	2000 Sydney	4 × 200 m freestyle
Bronze medal – third place	2004 Athens	200 m backstroke
Bronze medal – third place	2004 Athens	4 × 100 m medley
Bronze medal – third place	2004 Athens	4 × 200 m freestyle
World Championships (LC)
Gold medal – first place	2001 Fukuoka	4 × 100 m freestyle
Gold medal – first place	2003 Barcelona	100 m backstroke
Silver medal – second place	1998 Perth	4 × 100 m freestyle
Silver medal – second place	2001 Fukuoka	50 m backstroke
Silver medal – second place	2001 Fukuoka	4 × 100 m freestyle
Silver medal – second place	2005 Montreal	100 m backstroke
Silver medal – second place	2005 Montreal	4 × 100 m freestyle
Bronze medal – third place	2001 Fukuoka	100 m backstroke
Bronze medal – third place	2005 Montreal	50 m backstroke
Bronze medal – third place	2005 Montreal	4 × 100 m medley
World Championships (SC)
Gold medal – first place	2000 Athens	50 m backstroke
Gold medal – first place	2000 Athens	200 m backstroke
Silver medal – second place	1997 Gothenburg	4 × 100 m freestyle
Silver medal – second place	2000 Athens	4 × 100 m freestyle
Bronze medal – third place	2000 Athens	100 m backstroke
European Championships (LC)
Gold medal – first place	1997 Seville	100 m backstroke
Gold medal – first place	1997 Seville	4 × 100 m freestyle
Gold medal – first place	1997 Seville	4 × 200 m freestyle
Gold medal – first place	1997 Seville	4 × 100 m medley
Gold medal – first place	1999 Istanbul	4 × 100 m freestyle
Gold medal – first place	2002 Berlin	4 × 100 m medley
Silver medal – second place	1997 Seville	200 m backstroke
Silver medal – second place	2006 Budapest	100 m backstroke
Silver medal – second place	2006 Budapest	4 × 100 m medley
Bronze medal – third place	1997 Seville	100 m freestyle
Bronze medal – third place	2000 Helsinki	200 m backstroke
Bronze medal – third place	2002 Berlin	100 m backstroke
Bronze medal – third place	2006 Budapest	50 m backstroke
European Championships (SC)
Gold medal – first place	1996 Rostock	100 m backstroke
Gold medal – first place	1996 Rostock	4 × 50 m medley
Gold medal – first place	1998 Sheffield	200 m backstroke
Gold medal – first place	1999 Lisbon	200 m backstroke
Gold medal – first place	2002 Riesa	50 m backstroke
Gold medal – first place	2002 Riesa	100 m backstroke
Gold medal – first place	2003 Dublin	100 m backstroke
Gold medal – first place	2003 Dublin	200 m backstroke
Gold medal – first place	2004 Vienna	50 m backstroke
Gold medal – first place	2006 Helsinki	100 m butterfly
Gold medal – first place	2006 Helsinki	4 × 50 m medley
Silver medal – second place	1996 Rostock	200 m freestyle
Silver medal – second place	1996 Rostock	50 m backstroke
Silver medal – second place	1996 Rostock	200 m backstroke
Silver medal – second place	1998 Sheffield	100 m backstroke
Silver medal – second place	1999 Lisbon	100 m backstroke
Silver medal – second place	2002 Riesa	200 m backstroke
Silver medal – second place	2002 Riesa	4 × 50 m medley
Silver medal – second place	2003 Dublin	50 m backstroke
Silver medal – second place	2003 Dublin	4 × 50 m medley
Silver medal – second place	2004 Vienna	100 m backstroke
Silver medal – second place	2004 Vienna	4 × 50 m medley
Silver medal – second place	2006 Helsinki	100 m backstroke
Bronze medal – third place	1999 Lisbon	50 m backstroke
Bronze medal – third place	2002 Riesa	4 × 50 m freestyle

Antje Buschschulte (born 27 December 1978) is a German former swimmer. Her best disciplines were the short distance backstroke and freestyle races. Buschschulte swam for the sporting club SC Magdeburg. She participated in Olympic Games 1996, 2000, 2004, 2008 and won 5 Olympic bronze medals. She was World Champion in 100m backstroke 2003 in Barcelona. In total Antje won 57 international medals (Olympic Games, World Championships, European Championships). She is the only German swimmer who participated for 14 consecutive Olympiads (1995–2008) in every major longcourse championship (Olympic Games, World Championships, European Championships).

Antje holds a diploma in neurobiology from the Otto-von-Guericke-University in Magdeburg and currently works as head of the office for State Minister Rainer Robra in the State Chancellery of Saxony-Anhalt.

She lives with her husband Helge Meeuw and her daughters in Magdeburg.

== See also ==
- List of German records in swimming
