= Aya Terakawa =

Japanese swimmer (born 1984)

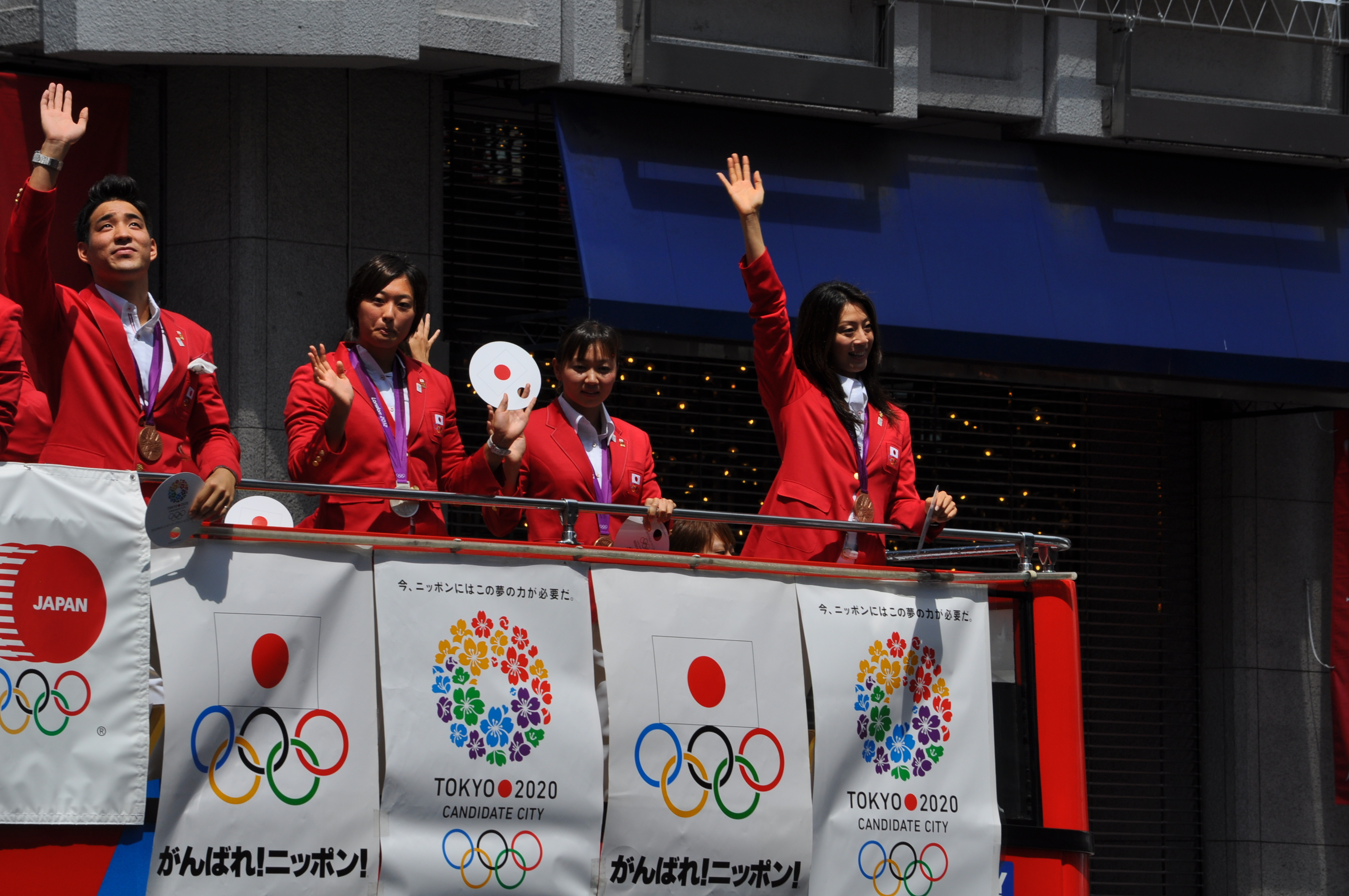

Personal information
- Nationality: Japan
- Born: November 12, 1984 (age 41) Osaka
- Height: 174 cm (5 ft 9 in)
- Weight: 60 kg (132 lb)

Sport
- Sport: Swimming
- Strokes: backstroke
- Club: MIZUNO
Medal record
Olympic Games
Bronze medal – third place	2012 London	100 m backstroke
Bronze medal – third place	2012 London	4×100 m medley
World Championships (LC)
Silver medal – second place	2011 Shanghai	50 m backstroke
Bronze medal – third place	2013 Barcelona	50 m backstroke
Bronze medal – third place	2013 Barcelona	100 m backstroke
Pan Pacific Championships
Silver medal – second place	2002 Yokohama	200m backstroke
Silver medal – second place	2010 Irvine	100 m backstroke
Silver medal – second place	2010 Irvine	50 m backstroke
Bronze medal – third place	2010 Irvine	4×100 m medley

Aya Terakawa (寺川綾, Terakawa Aya) (born November 12, 1984) is a retired Japanese backstroke swimmer; she announced her retirement from competitions in early December 2013. She is married to former swimmer Daisuke Hosokawa.

== Major achievements ==
- 2001 World Aquatics Championships – 200m backstroke 8th (2:14.12)
- 2002 Pan Pacific Swimming Championships – 200m backstroke 2nd (2:12.28)
- 2004 Athens Olympics – 200m backstroke 8th (2:12.90)
- 2012 London Olympics – 100m backstroke 3rd BRONZE (58.83)

== Personal bests ==
In long course

- 50m backstroke: 27.73 Japanese Record (July 29, 2009)
- 100m backstroke: 58.83 (April 17, 2009)
- 200m backstroke: 2:09.27 (April 19, 2009)

In short course

- 50m backstroke: 26.40 Asian, Japanese Record (February 15, 2009)
