= Ilona Hlaváčková =

Czech swimmer (born 1977)

Personal information
- Full name: Ilona Hlaváčková
- Nationality: Czech Republic
- Born: 15 March 1977 (age 49)
- Height: 1.80 m (5 ft 11 in)
- Weight: 75 kg (165 lb)

Sport
- Sport: Swimming
- Strokes: Backstroke
- Club: TJ Bohemians Praha
Medal record
World Championships (50 m)
Silver medal – second place	2003 Barcelona	50 m backstroke
European Championships (50 m)
Gold medal – first place	2004 Madrid	50 m backstroke
Bronze medal – third place	2000 Helsinki	50 m backstroke
World Championships (25 m)
Silver medal – second place	2002 Moscow	100 m backstroke
European Championships (25 m)
Gold medal – first place	2000 Valencia	50 m backstroke
Gold medal – first place	2000 Valencia	100 m backstroke
Gold medal – first place	2001 Antwerp	50 m backstroke
Gold medal – first place	2001 Antwerp	100 m backstroke
Gold medal – first place	2003 Dublin	50 m backstroke
Silver medal – second place	2002 Riesa	50 m backstroke
Silver medal – second place	2002 Riesa	100 m backstroke
Silver medal – second place	2003 Dublin	100 m backstroke
Bronze medal – third place	2004 Vienna	50 m backstroke
Universiade
Gold medal – first place	2001 Beijing	50 m backstroke
Gold medal – first place	2003 Daegu	50 m backstroke
Gold medal – first place	2003 Daegu	100 m backstroke
Bronze medal – third place	1999 Palma	100 m backstroke
Bronze medal – third place	2001 Beijing	100 m backstroke

Ilona Hlaváčková (born 15 March 1977) is a Czech backstroke swimmer. She competed at the 2000 and 2004 Olympics.

At the 2001 Short Course European Championships, she set the then European records in the 50 m and 100 m backstroke (27.06 and 57.75).

== See also ==
- List of European records in swimming
- List of Czech records in swimming
