= Chonlathorn Vorathamrong =

Thai swimmer (born 1980)

Personal information
- Full name: Chonlathorn Vorathamrong
- National team: Thailand
- Born: 8 September 1980 (age 46)
- Height: 1.66 m (5 ft 5 in)
- Weight: 50 kg (110 lb)

Sport
- Sport: Swimming
- Strokes: Backstroke
Medal record
Women's swimming
Representing Thailand
Southeast Asian Games
Gold medal – first place	2003 Hanoi	100 m backstroke
Gold medal – first place	2003 Hanoi	200 m backstroke
Silver medal – second place	2005 Manila	200 m backstroke
Bronze medal – third place	2005 Manila	100 m backstroke

Chonlathorn Vorathamrong (Thai: ชลธร วรธำรง; born September 8, 1980) is a Thai former swimmer, who specialized in backstroke events. She is a two-time Olympian (2000 and 2004) and a six-time medalist at the Southeast Asian Games (2001, 2003, and 2005).

Vorathamrong made her first Thai team at the 2000 Summer Olympics in Sydney. There, she failed to reach the semifinals in any of her individual events, finishing thirty-fifth in the 100 m backstroke (1:05.98), and thirty-second in the 200 m backstroke (2:21.59).

At the 2003 Southeast Asian Games in Hanoi, Vietnam, Vorathamrong won a total of two gold medals in the 100 m backstroke (1:05.47), and 200 m backstroke (2:19.11).

At the 2004 Summer Olympics in Athens, Vorathamrong maintained her program, competing again in the 100 and 200 m backstroke. She posted FINA B-standard entry times of 1:05.47 (100 m backstroke) and 2:19.11 (200 m backstroke) from the SEA Games. In the 100 m backstroke, Vorathamrong challenged six other swimmers in heat two, including 14-year-olds Anastassiya Prilepa of Kazakhstan and Olga Gnedovskaya of Uzbekistan. She posted a lifetime best of 1:05.15 to take a second spot and thirty-second overall by 0.23 of a second ahead of Turkey's Derya Erke. In the 200 m backstroke, Vorathamrong placed twenty-ninth overall from the morning's preliminaries. Swimming in the same heat as her first, she raced to seventh place by a 7.04-second margin behind winner Evelyn Verrasztó of Hungary, in a time of 2:21.11.
