= Khadija Ciss =

Senegalese swimmer (born 1983)

Personal information
- Full name: Khadija Ciss
- National team: Senegal
- Born: 26 March 1983 (age 43)
- Height: 1.76 m (5 ft 9 in)
- Weight: 61 kg (134 lb)

Sport
- Sport: Swimming
- Strokes: Freestyle
Medal record
Women's swimming
Representing Senegal
All-Africa Games
Bronze medal – third place	2003 Abuja	200 m freestyle

Khadija Ciss (born March 26, 1983) is a Senegalese former swimmer, who specialized in long-distance freestyle events. She won a bronze medal in the 200 m freestyle at the 2003 All-Africa Games in Abuja, Nigeria (2:09.00).

Ciss qualified for two swimming events at the 2004 Summer Olympics in Athens, by achieving FINA B-standard entry times of 2:05.51 (200 m freestyle) and 9:02.54 (800 m freestyle) from the EDF Swimming Open in Paris. In the 200 m freestyle, Ciss challenged five other swimmers on the second heat, including two-time Olympian Vesna Stojanovska of Macedonia. She rounded out the field to last place and fortieth overall by a 4.42-second margin behind winner Jana Myšková of the Czech Republic in 2:09.04. In her second event, 800 m freestyle, Ciss ended her Olympic run in twenty-ninth place with a slowest time of 9:20.06.
