= Yelena Rojkova =

Turkmen swimmer (born 1989)

Personal information
- Full name: Yelena Rojkova
- National team: Turkmenistan
- Born: 27 May 1989 (age 37) Ashgabat, Turkmen SSR, Soviet Union
- Height: 1.68 m (5 ft 6 in)
- Weight: 65 kg (143 lb)

Sport
- Sport: Swimming
- Strokes: Backstroke

Yelena Rojkova (born May 27, 1989) is a Turkmen swimmer, who specialized in backstroke events. Rojkova qualified for the women's 100 m backstroke at the 2004 Summer Olympics in Athens, by receiving a Universality place from FINA, in an entry time of 1:18.00. She participated in heat one against two other swimmers Lenient Obia of Nigeria, and Ana Galindo of Honduras. She rounded out a small field of three to last place by a 5.53-second margin behind winner Obia, breaking a Turkmen record of 1:15.48. Rojkova failed to advance into the semifinals, as she placed forty-second overall in the preliminaries.
