= Berit Aljand =

Estonian swimmer

Personal information
- Born: July 8, 1985 (age 40) Tallinn, then part of Estonian SSR, Soviet Union
- Education: Louisiana State University

Sport
- Sport: Swimming
- Strokes: Backstroke

Berit Aljand (born 8 July 1985) is an Estonian swimmer.

She was born in Tallinn. Her twin sister Triin and younger brother Martti are also swimmers. Her father Riho Aljand is a swimming coach, and her grandmother, Ulvi Voog (Indrikson) is a former Olympic swimmer. In 2010 she graduated from Louisiana State University in international relations speciality.

She started her swimming exercising in 1992, coached by his father. She has competed at the World Aquatics Championships. She is multiple-times Estonian champion in different swimming disciplines. 2000-2007 she was a member of Estonian national swim team.

She lives in Washington, DC.
