= Sarah Price (swimmer) =

English swimmer

Personal information
- Full name: Sarah Jane Price
- National team: Great Britain
- Born: 19 April 1979 (age 47) Enfield, London, England
- Height: 1.71 m (5 ft 7 in)
- Weight: 66 kg (146 lb; 10.4 st)

Sport
- Sport: Swimming
- Strokes: Backstroke
- College team: Loughborough University
Medal record
Women's swimming
Representing Great Britain
European Championships – Long Course
Bronze medal – third place	1997 Seville	4×100 m medley
European Championships – Short Course
Gold medal – first place	2001 Antwerp	200 m backstroke
Gold medal – first place	2002 Riesa	200 m backstroke
Silver medal – second place	2001 Antwerp	100 m backstroke
Silver medal – second place	2004 Vienna	200 m backstroke
Bronze medal – third place	1999 Lisbon	100 m backstroke
Bronze medal – third place	2000 Valencia	4×50 m medley
Bronze medal – third place	2002 Riesa	100 m backstroke
Representing England
Commonwealth Games
Gold medal – first place	2002 Manchester	100 m backstroke
Gold medal – first place	2002 Manchester	200 m backstroke
Bronze medal – third place	1998 Kuala Lumpur	4×100 m medley
Bronze medal – third place	2002 Manchester	50 m backstroke
Bronze medal – third place	2002 Manchester	4×100 m medley

Sarah Jane Price (born 19 April 1979) is a female English former backstroke swimmer.

== Swimming career ==
Price represented Great Britain in the Olympics and European championships, and competed for England in the Commonwealth Games. She began her swimming career at the Potters Bar club, and turned professional aged 15. She set her first British record in 1997 in the 50-metre backstroke. She also swam for Barnet Copthall Swimming Club, before ending her career at Loughborough University.

In 2001, at the European Short Course Swimming Championships, Price set a world record in the 200-metre backstroke winning gold. At the 2002 Commonwealth Games in Manchester, she won gold medals in the 100-metre and 200-metre backstroke races, and bronze in the 50-metre race and the 4×100-metre medley relay. At the 2004 Summer Olympics in Athens, she cut her leg on an underwater camera and was eliminated as a result. Price retired in March 2005.

At the ASA National British Championships she won the 50 metres backstroke title four times (1996, 2001, 2002, 2003) and the 100 metres backstroke title four times (1997, 1998, 2001, 2002).

== See also ==
- List of Commonwealth Games medallists in swimming (women)
