= Erin Gammel =

Canadian swimmer (born 1980)

Personal information
- Full name: Erin Gammel
- National team: Canada
- Born: March 13, 1980 (age 46) Kamloops, British Columbia
- Height: 1.85 m (6 ft 1 in)
- Weight: 66 kg (146 lb)

Sport
- Sport: Swimming
- Strokes: Backstroke
- College team: University of Calgary
Medal record
Women's swimming
Representing Canada
World Championships (SC)
Bronze medal – third place	1999 Hong Kong	100 m backstroke
Pan Pacific Championships
Bronze medal – third place	2002 Yokohama	4×100 m medley

Erin Gammel (born March 13, 1980) is a competition swimmer from Canada, who competed for her native country at the 2004 Summer Olympics in Athens, Greece. There she finished in 17th position in the 100-metre backstroke, and in 11th place with the Canadian team in the 4x100-metre medley relay.
