= Nina Zhivanevskaya =

Russian swimmer

Personal information
- Full name: Nina Aleksandrovna Zhivanevskaya
- Nationality: Russia (pre-1999); Spain (1999-)
- Born: 24 June 1977 (age 49) Kuybyshev, USSR
- Height: 1.68 m (5 ft 6 in)
- Weight: 123 lb (56 kg)

Sport
- Sport: Swimming
- Strokes: Backstroke
- Club: C.N. Sabadell (2000); C. Valenciano N. (2008)
Medal record
Women's swimming
Olympic Games
Representing the Unified Team
Bronze medal – third place	1992 Barcelona	4×100 m medley
Representing Spain
Bronze medal – third place	2000 Sydney	100 m backstroke
World Championships (LC)
Representing Russia
Silver medal – second place	1994 Rome	100 m backstroke
Bronze medal – third place	1994 Rome	4×100 m medley
Representing Spain
Gold medal – first place	2003 Barcelona	50 m backstroke
European Championships (LC)
Representing Russia
Silver medal – second place	1993 Sheffield	100 m backstroke
Silver medal – second place	1993 Sheffield	4×100 m medley
Bronze medal – third place	1993 Sheffield	200 m backstroke
Bronze medal – third place	1993 Sheffield	4×100 m freestyle
Bronze medal – third place	1995 Vienna	100 m backstroke
Representing Spain
Gold medal – first place	2000 Helsinki	50 m backstroke
Gold medal – first place	2000 Helsinki	100 m backstroke
Gold medal – first place	2000 Helsinki	200 m backstroke
Gold medal – first place	2002 Berlin	50 m backstroke
Silver medal – second place	1999 Istanbul	50 m backstroke
Silver medal – second place	1999 Istanbul	100 m backstroke
Silver medal – second place	2002 Berlin	200 m backstroke
Silver medal – second place	2004 Madrid	50 m backstroke
Silver medal – second place	2008 Eindhoven	50 m backstroke
Bronze medal – third place	2004 Madrid	100 m backstroke
Bronze medal – third place	2008 Eindhoven	100 m backstroke
European Championships (SC)
Representing Russia
Silver medal – second place	1992 Espoo	50 m backstroke
Silver medal – second place	1993 Gateshead	50 m backstroke
Representing Spain
Gold medal – first place	1999 Lisbon	100 m backstroke
Silver medal – second place	1999 Lisbon	50 m backstroke
Silver medal – second place	1999 Lisbon	200 m backstroke
Silver medal – second place	2000 Valencia	50 m backstroke
Silver medal – second place	2000 Valencia	200 m backstroke
Bronze medal – third place	2000 Valencia	100 m backstroke
Mediterranean Games
Gold medal – first place	2001 Tunis	100 m backstroke
Gold medal – first place	2001 Tunis	200 m backstroke

Nina Aleksandrovna Zhivanevskaya (Russian: Нина Александровна Живаневская, born 24 June 1977) is a 5-time Olympic backstroke swimmer from Russia, who has swum for Spain since 1999, following her marriage to a Spaniard (and moving to Spain).

She swam at the 1992 Olympics for the Unified Team, Russia at the 1996 Olympics, and Spain at the 2000, 2004 and 2008 Olympics. At the 1992 Games, she won a bronze medal in the 4×100 m medley relay, and was the youngest member of the Unified Team swimming squad (18 men and 11 women), with 15 years and 35 days.

She won the bronze medal in the 100 m backstroke a year later at the 2000 Olympics in Sydney, Australia.

Zhivanevskaya took part in the 2008 Olympic Games, reaching the semi-finals in the 100 m backstroke. After this event, she announced she was retiring from the sport so that she could concentrate on her family.

== See also ==
- List of doping cases in sport
- List of Spanish records in swimming
- World record progression 50 metres backstroke
