= Zhan Shu =

Chinese swimmer (born 1985)

Personal information
- Born: March 9, 1985 (age 41) Shenyang, China

Sport
- Sport: Swimming
Medal record
Representing China
World Championships (LC)
Gold medal – first place	2003 Barcelona	4x100m medley relay
Bronze medal – third place	2001 Fukuoka	4x100m medley relay
World Championships (SC)
Bronze medal – third place	2002 Moscow	4x100m medley relay
Summer Universiade
Gold medal – first place	2003 Daegu	4x100m medley relay
Bronze medal – third place	2003 Daegu	4x100m freestyle relay
Asian Games
Gold medal – first place	2002 Busan	100m backstroke
Gold medal – first place	2002 Busan	4x100m medley relay
Bronze medal – third place	2002 Busan	200m backstroke

Zhan Shu (born 9 March 1985) is a Chinese former backstroke and medley swimmer who competed in the 2000 Summer Olympics and in the 2004 Summer Olympics.
