= Anna Gostomelsky =

Israeli swimmer

Personal information
- Native name: Ганна Гостомельська
- Full name: Anna Gostomelsky
- Nationality: Israeli
- Born: June 9, 1981 (age 45) Kiev, Ukraine, Soviet Union

Sport
- Sport: Swimming
- Club: Maccabi Kiryat Bialik
Medal record
Representing Israel
European Championships (SC)
Bronze medal – third place	2006 Helsinki	50 m backstroke
Maccabiah Games
Gold medal – first place	2005 Israel	100m freestyle

Anna Gostomelsky (Ukrainian: Ганна Гостомельська; Russian: Анна Гостомельская, Hebrew: אניה גוסטומלסקי; born 9 June 1981) is an Israeli swimmer who represented Israel at the 2004 and 2008 Summer Olympics.

== Biography ==
Gostomelsky was born to a Jewish family in Kiev, Soviet Union (now Ukraine). She immigrated to Israel with her family at age 10. She holds the most Israeli swimming records of any female swimmer.

She competed on behalf of Israel at the 2004 Summer Olympics, in Athens, Greece, and Israel at the 2008 Summer Olympics in Beijing, China.

At the 2005 Maccabiah Games, she won the women's 100m freestyle and set a new Maccabiah record.

== See also ==
- List of Israeli records in swimming
