= Saida Iskandarova =

Uzbekistani swimmer (born 1980)

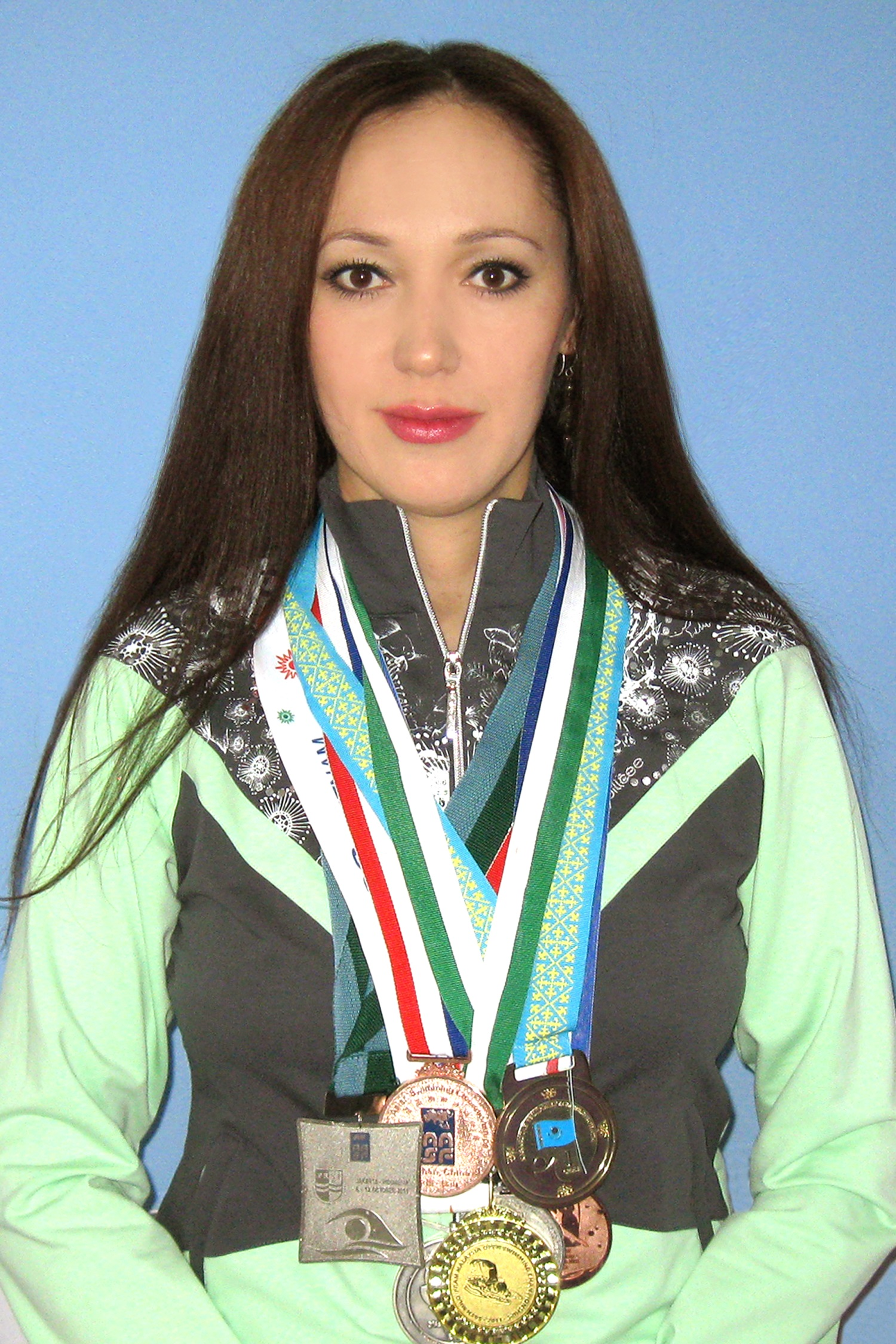

Personal information
- Full name: Saida Iskandarova
- National team: Uzbekistan
- Born: 12 March 1980 (age 46) Tashkent, Uzbek SSR, Soviet Union
- Height: 1.70 m (5 ft 7 in)
- Weight: 63 kg (139 lb)

Sport
- Sport: Swimming
- Strokes: Freestyle, backstroke

Saida Iskandarova (Uzbek: Саида Искандарова; born March 12, 1980) is an Uzbek former swimmer who specialized in backstroke, but also competed in sprint freestyle. She is a two-time Olympian (2000 and 2004), and currently the head coach for the Uzbekistan National Swimming Team.

Iskandarova made her Olympic debut, as Uzbekistan's first ever female swimmer, at the 2000 Summer Olympics in Sydney, where she competed in the women's 50 m freestyle. Swimming in heat four, she picked up a sixth seed and fifty-fifth overall by 0.23 of a second behind Moldova's Maria Tregubova in 27.75.

At the 2004 Summer Olympics in Athens, Iskandarova qualified for the 200 m backstroke by clearing a FINA B-standard entry time of 2:19.98 from the Belarus Open Championships in Minsk. She participated in the first heat, against two other swimmers Gretchen Gotay of Puerto Rico, and Sherry Tsai of Hong Kong. She rounded out a small field of three to last place by a 6.24-second margin behind winner Tsai, outside her entry time of 2:26.17. Iskandarova failed to advance into the semifinals, as she placed thirty-second overall in the preliminaries.
