= Stanislava Komarova =

Russian swimmer (born 1986)

Medal record

Women's swimming

Representing Russia

Olympic Games
Silver medal – second place	2004 Athens	200 m backstroke

World Championships (LC)
Silver medal – second place	2001 Fukuoka	200 m backstroke
Bronze medal – third place	2003 Barcelona	200 m backstroke

European Championships (LC)
Gold medal – first place	2002 Berlin	100 m backstroke
Gold medal – first place	2002 Berlin	200 m backstroke
Gold medal – first place	2004 Madrid	200 m backstroke
Silver medal – second place	2004 Madrid	100 m backstroke

European Championships (SC)
Silver medal – second place	2003 Dublin	200 m backstroke
Bronze medal – third place	2002 Riesa	200 m backstroke

Stanislava Stanislavovna Komarova (Russian: Станислава Станиславовна Комарова; born 12 June 1986 in Moscow) is a retired Russian swimmer. She won the silver medal in the 200 m backstroke at the 2004 Summer Olympics in Athens. Komarova was one of the few modern swimmers who competed without goggles.

In 2006, having parted with her long-time coach Alexey Krasikov, she moved to Tenero, Switzerland, where for a while she trained with Guennadi Touretski. She retired in 2008, aged 22, after a conflict with the Russian Swimming Federation. In 2012-2015 she worked as a sports commentator for NTV (Russia) and hosted the programme "Football Haute Couture". As of 2018 she works as a trainer, for her own Stanislava Komarova Swimming Group (SKSG) which she started in 2014 in Moscow.

Komarova is the recipient of the Medal of the Order "For Merit to the Fatherland" (2005). She is decorated with the title Meritorious Master of Sports in Russia.

In 2009 she married the volleyball player Aleksey Ostapenko, they divorced in 2011. Her second husband Andrey is a grandson of the tennis player and later commentator Anna Dmitrieva.
