= Iryna Amshennikova =

Ukrainian swimmer

Personal information
- Born: 19 May 1986 (age 40) Komsomolsk, Ukrainian SSR, Soviet Union
- Height: 1.74 m (5 ft 9 in)
- Weight: 58 kg (128 lb)
Medal record
Women's swimming
Representing Ukraine
World Championships (SC)
Bronze medal – third place	2002 Moscow	200 m backstroke
European Championships (SC)
Gold medal – first place	2005 Trieste	200 m backstroke
Silver medal – second place	2006 Helsinki	200 m backstroke
Silver medal – second place	2006 Helsinki	50 m backstroke
Bronze medal – third place	2003 Dublin	200 m backstroke
Bronze medal – third place	2006 Helsinki	100 m backstroke
Bronze medal – third place	2007 Debrecen	200 m backstroke
European Championships (LC)
Silver medal – second place	2004 Madrid	4×100 m medley
Silver medal – second place	2006 Budapest	200 m backstroke
Bronze medal – third place	2002 Berlin	200 m backstroke
Bronze medal – third place	2002 Berlin	4×100 m medley
European Junior Championships
Silver medal – second place	2002 Linz	200 m backstroke
Bronze medal – third place	2001 Malta	100 m backstroke
Bronze medal – third place	2002 Linz	100 m backstroke

Iryna Vitaliïvna Amshennikova (Ukrainian: Ірина Віталіївна Амшеннікова, born 19 May 1986) is a Ukrainian backstroke swimmer. She had her best achievements in short course competitions, where she won bronze at the 2002 FINA World Swimming Championships (25 m) in the 200 m backstroke and six medals, including one gold, at the European Short Course Swimming Championships. She also competed at the 2004 and 2008 Summer Olympics in several events, but was eliminated in the preliminaries. During her career she set 29 national records in the 50–200 m backstroke and various relay events.

== Biography ==
Amshennikova was born in Komsomolsk, Ukraine, to Olga Oleksandrovna (Ukrainian: Ольга Олександрівна), a competitive swimmer, and Vitali Alekseevich (Ukrainian: Віталій Олексійович), an amateur track and orienteering athlete. Her brother Eugene (Ukrainian: Женя) started with swimming but then became a competitive shooter. In 1997, her local pool was closed for reparations and Iryna moved to Kyiv, where she studied and trained in a boarding school. In 2004, she relocated to Zaporizhia to train with the coach Anatoly Zhuravlev. She graduated from the National University of Physical Education and Sports of Ukraine.
