= Kiera Aitken =

Bermudian swimmer (born 1983)

Personal information
- Full name: Kiera Aitken
- Nationality: Bermuda
- Born: 31 October 1983 (age 42) Devonshire, Bermuda

Sport
- Sport: Swimming
- Strokes: Backstroke
- College team: Dalhousie University

Kiera Leigh Aitken (born 31 October 1983) is an Olympic and national-record holding swimmer from Bermuda. She is one of Bermuda's most successful swimmers, and has twice been named Bermuda's Female Athlete of the Year (for 2004 and 2009). She carried Bermuda's flag at the Opening Ceremonies of the 2010 Commonwealth Games and at the closing ceremony of the 2008 Olympic Games in Beijing, China.

She has swum for Bermuda at:

- Olympics: 2004, 2008
- Commonwealth Games: 2006, 2010
- World Championships: 2007, 2009
- Pan American Games: 2003, 2007

She swam in college at Canada's Dalhousie University.

Aitken, who specialised in the 100-metre backstroke, attempted to qualify for her third Olympic Games in 2012 but was unsuccessful. In 2013, she announced her decision to retire from competitive swimming.
