= Louise Ørnstedt =

Danish swimmer (born 1985)

Personal information
- Full name: Louise Ørnstedt
- Nationality: Denmark
- Born: 23 March 1985 (age 41) Odense, Syddanmark

Sport
- Sport: Swimming
- Strokes: Backstroke
- Club: odenseanske FORWARD
Medal record
World Championships (LC)
Silver medal – second place	2003 Barcelona	100 m backstroke
European Championships (LC)
Bronze medal – third place	2000 Helsinki	100 m backstroke
European Championships (SC)
Gold medal – first place	2004 Vienna	200 m backstroke
Gold medal – first place	2005 Trieste	50 m backstroke
Silver medal – second place	2005 Trieste	100 m backstroke
Silver medal – second place	2005 Trieste	200 m backstroke
Bronze medal – third place	2003 Dublin	50 m backstroke
Bronze medal – third place	2004 Vienna	100 m backstroke

Louise Ørnstedt (born 23 March 1985) was a Danish backstroke swimmer who competed at the 2000 and 2004 Olympics.

She retired from swimming in August 2007 due to persistent shoulder problems.

== See also ==
- List of Nordic records in swimming
- List of Danish records in swimming
