= 2002 Pan Pacific Swimming Championships – Women's 100 metre freestyle =

Women's 100 metre freestyle at the 2002 Pan Pacific Swimming Championships
- Venue: Yokohama International Swimming Pool
- Dates: August 28, 2002 (heats & semifinals); August 29, 2002 (final)
- Competitors: 38 from 9 nations
- Winning time: 53.99

Medalists
gold medal	Natalie Coughlin	United States
silver medal	Jodie Henry	Australia
bronze medal	Jenny Thompson	United States

The women's 100 metre freestyle competition at the 2002 Pan Pacific Swimming Championships took place on August 28–29 at the Yokohama International Swimming Pool. The last champion was Jenny Thompson of US.

This race consisted of two lengths of the pool, both lengths being in freestyle.

== Records ==
Prior to this competition, the existing world and Pan Pacific records were as follows:

World record	Inge de Bruijn (NED)	53.77	Sydney, Australia	September 20, 2000
Pan Pacific Championships record	Jenny Thompson (USA)	54.82	Fukuoka, Japan	August 11, 1997

== Results ==
All times are in minutes and seconds.

KEY:	q	Fastest non-qualifiers	Q	Qualified	CR	Championships record	NR	National record	PB	Personal best	SB	Seasonal best

=== Heats ===
The first round was held on August 28.

Rank	Heat	Lane	Name	Nationality	Time	Notes
1	6	4	Natalie Coughlin	United States	54.94	Q
2	6	3	Gabrielle Rose	United States	55.15	Q
3	6	5	Jenny Thompson	United States	55.25	Q
4	5	4	Lindsay Benko	United States	55.52	Q
5	4	5	Rhiannon Jeffrey	United States	55.71	Q
6	4	4	Sarah Ryan	Australia	55.73	Q
7	5	5	Jodie Henry	Australia	55.97	Q
8	4	6	Tomoko Nagai	Japan	55.98	Q
9	4	7	Alison Fitch	New Zealand	55.99	Q
10	5	6	Courtney Shealy	United States	56.08	Q
11	5	1	Rebecca Creedy	Australia	56.37	Q
12	5	3	Alice Mills	Australia	56.64	Q
13	4	3	Laura Nicholls	Canada	56.72	Q
14	4	1	Kaori Yamada	Japan	56.74	Q
15	6	7	Cassie Hunt	Australia	56.78	Q
16	5	7	Norie Urabe	Japan	56.89	Q
17	6	8	Haley Cope	United States	56.93	
18	6	1	Maki Mita	Japan	57.05	
19	6	6	Tammie Stone	United States	57.11	
20	3	8	Audrey Lacroix	Canada	57.33	
21	5	2	Joscelin Yeo	Singapore	57.66	
22	5	8	Zhou Yafei	China	57.67	
23	3	4	Elizabeth Collins	Canada	57.69	
24	2	6	Mary Descenza	United States	57.86	
25	3	2	Sarah Jackson	New Zealand	57.93	
26	3	7	Felicity Galvez	Australia	58.03	
27	2	2	Mariana Brochado	Brazil	58.24	
28	2	3	Mary Hill	United States	58.28	
29	2	5	Frances Adcock	Australia	58.29	
30	1	4	Dana Kirk	United States	58.44	
31	6	2	Elka Graham	Australia	58.57	
32	3	1	Maiko Fujino	Japan	59.15	
33	2	8	Jennifer Ng	Hong Kong	59.57	
34	1	5	Hing Ting Tang	Hong Kong	59.91	
35	1	3	Nathalie Bernard	New Zealand	1:00.15	
36	2	7	Shuk Mui Pang	Hong Kong	1:00.17	
37	2	1	Wei Min Teo	Singapore	1:00.20	
38	2	4	Rebecca Linton	New Zealand	1:00.21	
-	3	3	Jen Button	Canada	DNS	
-	3	5	Toni Jeffs	New Zealand	DNS	
-	3	6	Rebeca Gusmão	Brazil	DNS	
-	4	2	Giaan Rooney	Australia	DNS	
-	4	8	Jessica Deglau	Canada	DNS	

=== Semifinals ===
The semifinals were held on August 28.

Rank	Heat	Lane	Name	Nationality	Time	Notes
1	2	4	Natalie Coughlin	United States	54.72	Q, CR
2	2	5	Jenny Thompson	United States	55.05	Q
3	1	5	Lindsay Benko	United States	55.36	Q
4	1	3	Jodie Henry	Australia	55.47	Q
5	1	4	Gabrielle Rose	United States	55.51	Q
6	2	3	Sarah Ryan	Australia	55.58	Q
7	2	6	Tomoko Nagai	Japan	55.69	Q
8	1	6	Alison Fitch	New Zealand	56.34	Q
9	2	2	Rebecca Creedy	Australia	56.38	
10	2	7	Kaori Yamada	Japan	56.51	
11	1	2	Laura Nicholls	Canada	56.70	
12	2	1	Norie Urabe	Japan	56.72	
13	2	8	Audrey Lacroix	Canada	57.00	
14	1	7	Cassie Hunt	Australia	57.05	
15	1	1	Maki Mita	Japan	57.59	
16	1	8	Zhou Yafei	China	58.36	

=== Final ===
The final was held on August 29.

Rank	Lane	Name	Nationality	Time	Notes
1st place, gold medalist(s)	4	Natalie Coughlin	United States	53.99	CR, AM
2nd place, silver medalist(s)	3	Jodie Henry	Australia	54.55	OC
3rd place, bronze medalist(s)	5	Jenny Thompson	United States	54.75	
4	2	Tomoko Nagai	Japan	55.64	
5	6	Sarah Ryan	Australia	55.78	
6	8	Laura Nicholls	Canada	56.41	
7	1	Kaori Yamada	Japan	56.56	
8	7	Alison Fitch	New Zealand	56.91	
