= 2002 Pan Pacific Swimming Championships – Women's 50 metre freestyle =

Women's 50 metre freestyle at the 2002 Pan Pacific Swimming Championships
- Venue: Yokohama International Swimming Pool
- Dates: August 26, 2002 (heats & semifinals); August 27, 2002 (final)
- Competitors: 23 from 8 nations
- Winning time: 25.13

Medalists
gold medal	Jenny Thompson	United States
silver medal	Jodie Henry	Australia
bronze medal	Tammie Stone	United States

The women's 50 metre freestyle competition at the 2002 Pan Pacific Swimming Championships took place on August 26–27 at the Yokohama International Swimming Pool. The last champion was Jenny Thompson of US.

This race consisted of one length of the pool in freestyle.

== Records ==
Prior to this competition, the existing world and Pan Pacific records were as follows:

World record	Inge de Bruijn (NED)	24.13	Sydney, Australia	September 22, 2000
Pan Pacific Championships record	Amy Van Dyken (USA)	25.03	Atlanta, United States	August 13, 1995

== Results ==
All times are in minutes and seconds.

KEY:	q	Fastest non-qualifiers	Q	Qualified	CR	Championships record	NR	National record	PB	Personal best	SB	Seasonal best

=== Heats ===
The first round was held on August 26.

Rank	Heat	Lane	Name	Nationality	Time	Notes
1	1	5	Alice Mills	Australia	25.39	Q
2	2	5	Jenny Thompson	United States	25.49	Q
3	3	4	Tammie Stone	United States	25.57	Q
4	3	5	Jodie Henry	Australia	25.69	Q
4	2	4	Haley Cope	United States	25.82	Q
6	3	3	Sarah Ryan	Australia	25.87	Q
7	1	4	Toni Jeffs	New Zealand	25.95	Q
7	2	3	Cassie Hunt	Australia	25.95	Q
9	1	3	Laura Nicholls	Canada	25.98	Q
10	3	2	Rebecca Creedy	Australia	26.08	Q
11	2	6	Kaori Yamada	Japan	26.23	Q
12	3	6	Tomoko Nagai	Japan	26.29	Q
13	2	2	Courtney Shealy	United States	26.30	Q
13	3	7	Alison Fitch	New Zealand	26.30	Q
15	1	6	Joscelin Yeo	Singapore	26.57	Q
16	1	2	Rebeca Gusmão	Brazil	26.78	?
16	2	7	Norie Urabe	Japan	26.78	?
18	1	7	Hannah McLean	New Zealand	26.87	
19	1	8	Jennifer Ng	Hong Kong	27.16	
19	2	1	Dyana Calub	Australia	27.16	
21	3	1	Sherry Tsai	Hong Kong	27.37	
22	1	1	Hing Ting Tang	Hong Kong	27.60	
23	3	8	Shuk Mui Pang	Hong Kong	27.68	
-	2	8	Maureen Farrell	United States	DNS	

=== Semifinals ===
The semifinals were held on August 26.

Rank	Heat	Lane	Name	Nationality	Time	Notes
1	2	5	Tammie Stone	United States	25.26	Q
2	1	5	Jodie Henry	Australia	25.29	Q, OC
3	1	4	Jenny Thompson	United States	25.48	Q
4	2	3	Haley Cope	United States	25.53	Q
5	2	4	Alice Mills	Australia	25.64	Q
6	1	3	Sarah Ryan	Australia	25.91	Q
7	2	2	Laura Nicholls	Canada	25.94	Q
8	1	6	Cassie Hunt	Australia	25.99	Q
9	2	6	Toni Jeffs	New Zealand	26.08	
10	1	2	Kaori Yamada	Japan	26.17	
11	2	7	Tomoko Nagai	Japan	26.22	
12	2	1	Alison Fitch	New Zealand	26.35	
13	1	7	Courtney Shealy	United States	26.40	
14	1	1	Joscelin Yeo	Singapore	26.44	
15	1	8	Norie Urabe	Japan	26.81	
16	2	8	Rebeca Gusmão	Brazil	27.20	

=== Final ===
The final was held on August 27.

Rank	Lane	Name	Nationality	Time	Notes
1st place, gold medalist(s)	3	Jenny Thompson	United States	25.13	
2nd place, silver medalist(s)	5	Jodie Henry	Australia	25.32	
3rd place, bronze medalist(s)	4	Tammie Stone	United States	25.42	
4	6	Alice Mills	Australia	25.66	
5	2	Laura Nicholls	Canada	25.78	
6	7	Toni Jeffs	New Zealand	25.97	
7	1	Kaori Yamada	Japan	26.09	
8	8	Tomoko Nagai	Japan	26.10	
