= 2006 Pan Pacific Swimming Championships – Women's 4 × 100 metre freestyle relay =

Women's 4 × 100 metre freestyle relay at the 2006 Pan Pacific Swimming Championships
- Venue: Saanich Commonwealth Place
- Dates: August 19, 2006 (heats & finals)
- Winning time: 3:35.80

Medalists
gold medal	Amanda Weir, Natalie Coughlin, Kara Lynn Joyce and Lacey Nymeyer	United States
silver medal	Victoria Poon, Genevieve Saumur, Julia Wilkinson and Erica Morningstar	Canada
bronze medal	Shayne Reese, Kelly Stubbins, Linda Mackenzie and Melanie Schlanger	Australia

The women's 4 × 100 metre freestyle relay competition at the 2006 Pan Pacific Swimming Championships took place on August 19 at the Saanich Commonwealth Place. The last champion was Australia.

This race consisted of eight lengths of the pool. Each of the four swimmers completed two lengths of the pool. The first swimmer had to touch the wall before the second could leave the starting block.

== Records ==
Prior to this competition, the existing world and Pan Pacific records were as follows:

World record	Germany (GER); Petra Dallmann (54.53); Daniela Götz (53.87); Britta Steffen (52.66); Annika Lurz (54.16)	3:35.22	Budapest, Hungary	July 31, 2006
Pan Pacific Championships record	Australia (AUS); Jodie Henry (54.94); Alice Mills (55.15); Petria Thomas (55.35); Sarah Ryan (54.34)	3:39.78	Yokohama, Japan	August 24, 2002

== Results ==
All times are in minutes and seconds.

KEY:	q	Fastest non-qualifiers	Q	Qualified	CR	Championships record	NR	National record	PB	Personal best	SB	Seasonal best

=== Heats ===
Heats weren't performed, as only seven teams had entered.

=== Final ===
The final was held on August 19, at 19:57.

Rank	Lane	Name	Nationality	Time	Notes
1st place, gold medalist(s)	5	Amanda Weir (53.76); Natalie Coughlin (53.21); Kara Lynn Joyce (54.54); Lacey Nymeyer (54.29)	United States	3:35.80	CR
2nd place, silver medalist(s)	3	Victoria Poon (56.54); Genevieve Saumur (55.38); Julia Wilkinson (55.37); Erica Morningstar (54.54)	Canada	3:41.83	
3rd place, bronze medalist(s)	4	Shayne Reese (55.58); Kelly Stubbins (55.92); Linda Mackenzie (55.62); Melanie Schlanger (54.72)	Australia	3:41.84	
4	7	Maki Mita (55.98); Norie Urabe (55.53); Ai Shibata (56.11); Kaori Yamada (56.04)	Japan	3:43.66	
5	6	Lauren Boyle (57.35); Helen Norfolk (56.34); Alison Fitch (55.89); Hannah McLean (55.66)	New Zealand	3:45.24	
6	2	Lee Keo-Ra (56.61); Kim Dal-Eun (56.67); Lee Nam-Eun (57.26); Lee Ji-Eun (57.29)	South Korea	3:47.83	
7	1	Hannah Wilson (57.24); Sze Hang Yu (58.20); Tsai Hiu Wai (57.16); Lee Leong Kwai (58.90)	Hong Kong	3:51.50	
