= Swimming at the 2002 Commonwealth Games – Women's 50 metre freestyle =

Women's 50 metre freestyle at the 2002 Commonwealth Games
- Venue: Manchester Aquatics Centre
- Dates: 2 August (heats, semifinals); 3 August (final)
- Competitors: 38 from 25 nations
- Winning time: 24.76

Medalists
gold medal	Alison Sheppard	Scotland
silver medal	Jodie Henry	Australia
bronze medal	Toni Jeffs	New Zealand

The women's 50 metre freestyle event at the 2002 Commonwealth Games was held on 2 and 3 August at the Manchester Aquatics Centre.

== Records ==
Prior to this competition, the existing world, Commonwealth and Games records were as follows:

World record	Inge De Bruijn (NED)	24.13	Sydney, Australia	22 September 2000
Commonwealth record				
Games record				

The following records were established during the competition:

Date	Event	Name	Nationality	Time	Record
2 August	Heats	Alice Mills	Australia	25.65	GR
2 August	Heats	Alison Sheppard	Scotland	24.68	GR

== Results ==
=== Heats ===
The heats were held on 2 August, starting at 11:32.

Rank	Heat	Lane	Name	Nation	Time	Notes
1	5	4	Alison Sheppard	Scotland	24.68	Q, GR
2	5	3	Toni Jeffs	New Zealand	25.43	Q
3	4	5	Alice Mills	Australia	25.65	Q, GR
4	4	4	Jodie Henry	Australia	25.86	Q
5	3	2	Laura Pomeroy	Canada	25.92	Q
6	5	5	Rosalind Brett	England	25.93	Q
7	4	6	Laura Nicholls	Canada	25.94	Q
8	4	3	Vivienne Rignall	New Zealand	26.01	Q
9	3	4	Sarah Ryan	Australia	26.28	Q
9	5	6	Catrin Davies	Wales	26.28	Q
11	3	6	Sarah Whewell	England	26.32	Q
11	5	2	Helene Muller	South Africa	26.32	Q
11	5	3	Joscelin Yeo	Singapore	26.32	Q
14	3	5	Melanie Marshall	England	26.34	Q
15	4	7	Caroline Pickering	Fiji	26.36	Q
16	3	3	Julie Douglas	Northern Ireland	26.38	Q
17	4	2	Leah Martindale	Barbados	26.47	
18	4	1	Samantha McNeilly	Scotland	26.51	
19	5	1	Jenna Gresdal	Canada	26.57	
20	5	7	Mandy Leach	Zimbabwe	26.74	
21	3	1	Linda McEachrane	Trinidad and Tobago	27.00	
22	4	8	Sharntelle McLean	Trinidad and Tobago	27.09	
22	2	1	Angela Chuck	Jamaica	27.09	
24	5	8	Julia Martin	Wales	27.20	
25	2	7	Tamara Swaby	Jamaica	27.25	
26	2	6	Nikia Deveaux	Bahamas	27.35	
27	2	5	Karla Hancocks	Wales	27.45	
28	2	3	Anna-Liza Mopio-Jane	Papua New Guinea	27.65	
29	2	8	Emma Hirst	Jersey	27.88	
30	2	2	Kiera Aitken	Bermuda	28.05	
31	1	4	Emily Crookall-Nixon	Isle of Man	28.60	
32	1	6	Elaine Reyes	Gibraltar	29.18	
33	1	3	Tanya Anacleto	Mozambique	29.37	
34	1	7	Rachel Fortunato	Gibraltar	29.51	
35	1	2	Nathalie Lee Baw	Mauritius	29.52	
36	1	5	Sana Abdul Wahid	Pakistan	30.73	
37	1	8	Ursula Kuenzli	Zambia	30.75	
38	1	1	Olivia Aya Nakitanda	Uganda	31.16	

=== Semifinals ===
The semifinals were held on 2 August at 19:53.

==== Semifinal 1 ====
Rank	Lane	Name	Nation	Result	Notes
1	5	Jodie Henry	Australia	25.47	Q
2	4	Toni Jeffs	New Zealand	25.63	Q
3	3	Rosalind Brett	England	25.93	Q
4	6	Vivienne Rignall	New Zealand	26.05	Q
5	2	Catrin Davies	Wales	26.08	Q
6	7	Helene Muller	South Africa	26.10	
7	8	Julie Douglas	Northern Ireland	26.33	
8	1	Melanie Marshall	England	26.46	

==== Semifinal 2 ====
Rank	Lane	Name	Nation	Result	Notes
1	4	Alison Sheppard	Scotland	24.79	Q,
2	5	Alice Mills	Australia	25.64	Q
3	3	Laura Pomeroy	Canada	25.85	Q
4	6	Laura Nicholls	Canada	26.09	
5	2	Sarah Ryan	Australia	26.15	
6	7	Sarah Whewell	England	26.19	
7	1	Joscelin Yeo	Singapore	26.20	
8	8	Caroline Pickering	Fiji	26.39	

=== Final ===
The final was held on 3 August at 19:04.

Rank	Lane	Name	Nation	Result	Notes
1st place, gold medalist(s)	4	Alison Sheppard	Scotland	24.76	
2nd place, silver medalist(s)	5	Jodie Henry	Australia	25.37	
2nd place, silver medalist(s)	3	Toni Jeffs	New Zealand	25.48	
4	6	Alice Mills	Australia	25.81	
5	2	Laura Pomeroy	Canada	25.99	
6	1	Vivienne Rignall	New Zealand	26.02	
7	7	Rosalind Brett	England	26.03	
8	8	Catrin Davies	Wales	26.54	
