= 2002 Pan Pacific Swimming Championships – Women's 4 × 100 metre freestyle relay =

2002 Pan Pacific: Yokohama, Japan

Women's 4 × 100 metre freestyle relay at the 2002 Pan Pacific Swimming Championships
- Venue: Yokohama International Swimming Pool
- Dates: August 24, 2002 (heats & finals)
- Winning time: 3:39.78

Medalists
gold medal	Jodie Henry, Alice Mills, Petria Thomas and Sarah Ryan	Australia
silver medal	Lindsay Benko, Natalie Coughlin, Rhi Jeffrey and Jenny Thompson	United States
bronze medal	Tomoko Hagiwara, Tomoko Nagai, Norie Urabe and Kaori Yamada	Japan

The women's 4 × 100 metre freestyle relay competition at the 2002 Pan Pacific Swimming Championships took place on August 24 at the Yokohama International Swimming Pool. The last champion was the United States.

This race consisted of eight lengths of the pool. Each of the four swimmers completed two lengths of the pool. The first swimmer had to touch the wall before the second could leave the starting block.

== Records ==
Prior to this competition, the existing world and Pan Pacific records were as follows:

World record	Germany (GER); Katrin Meissner (54.82); Petra Dallmann (53.95); Sandra Völker (53.59); Franziska van Almsick (53.64)	3:36.00	Berlin, Germany	July 29, 2002
Pan Pacific Championships record	United States (USA); Amy Van Dyken (55.76); Angel Martino (55.58); Melanie Valerio (55.55); Jenny Thompson (54.70)	3:41.59	Atlanta, United States	August 12, 1995

== Results ==
All times are in minutes and seconds.

KEY:	q	Fastest non-qualifiers	Q	Qualified	CR	Championships record	NR	National record	PB	Personal best	SB	Seasonal best

=== Heats ===
Heats weren't performed, as only eight teams had entered.

=== Final ===
The final was held on August 24.

Rank	Lane	Name	Nationality	Time	Notes
1st place, gold medalist(s)	4	Jodie Henry (54.94); Alice Mills (55.15); Petria Thomas (55.35); Sarah Ryan (54.34)	Australia	3:39.78	CR
2nd place, silver medalist(s)	5	Lindsay Benko (55.35); Natalie Coughlin (54.69); Rhi Jeffrey (55.34); Jenny Thompson (54.85)	United States	3:40.23	
3rd place, bronze medalist(s)	3	Tomoko Hagiwara (54.97); Tomoko Nagai (55.10); Norie Urabe (56.28); Kaori Yamada (55.88)	Japan	3:42.23	
4	6	Laura Nicholls (56.77); Elizabeth Collins (56.97); Jen Button (56.32); Jessica Deglau (57.12)	Canada	3:47.18	
5	2	Toni Jeffs (59.21); Hannah McLean (57.45); Sarah Jackson (57.76); Alison Fitch (55.33)	New Zealand	3:49.75	
6	7	Denise Oliveira (59.13); Monique Ferreira (57.69); Rebeca Gusmão (59.45); Mariana Brochado (57.54)	Brazil	3:53.81	
7	1	Jennifer Ng (59.17); Hing Ting Tang (59.28); Shuk Mui Pang (59.46); Sherry Tsai (57.79)	Hong Kong	3:55.70	
8	8	Joscelin Yeo (57.65); Wei Min Teo (59.46); Tse May Heng (1:01.97); U Nice Chan (59.85)	Singapore	3:58.93	
