= 1999 Pan Pacific Swimming Championships – Women's 100 metre freestyle =

Women's 100 metre freestyle at the 1999 Pan Pacific Swimming Championships
- Venue: Sydney International Aquatic Centre
- Dates: August 26, 1999 (heats & semifinals); August 27, 1999 (final)
- Competitors: 45 from 10 nations
- Winning time: 54.89

Medalists
gold medal	Jenny Thompson	United States
silver medal	Sarah Ryan	Australia
bronze medal	Rebecca Creedy	Australia

The women's 100 metre freestyle competition at the 1999 Pan Pacific Swimming Championships took place on August 26–27 at the Sydney International Aquatic Centre. The last champion was Jenny Thompson of US.

This race consisted of two lengths of the pool, both lengths being in freestyle.

== Records ==
Prior to this competition, the existing world and Pan Pacific records were as follows:

World record	Le Jingyi (CHN)	54.01	Rome, Italy	September 5, 1994
Pan Pacific Championships record	Jenny Thompson (USA)	54.82	Fukuoka, Japan	August 11, 1997

== Results ==
All times are in minutes and seconds.

KEY:	q	Fastest non-qualifiers	Q	Qualified	CR	Championships record	NR	National record	PB	Personal best	SB	Seasonal best

=== Heats ===
The first round was held on August 26.

Rank	Name	Nationality	Time	Notes
1	Jenny Thompson	United States	56.13	Q
2	Claudia Poll	Costa Rica	56.22	Q
3	Liesl Kolbisen	United States	56.29	Q
4	Laura Nicholls	Canada	56.32	Q
5	Sarah Ryan	Australia	56.38	Q
6	Kari Haag-Woodall	United States	56.49	Q
7	Rebecca Creedy	Australia	56.58	Q
8	Samantha Arsenault	United States	56.69	Q
9	Suzu Chiba	Japan	56.70	Q
10	Sarah Tolar	United States	56.77	
11	Lori Munz	Australia	56.94	Q
12	Junko Nakatani	Japan	57.39	Q
13	Giaan Rooney	Australia	57.43	Q
14	Jacinta van Lint	Australia	57.44	
15	Charlene Wittstock	South Africa	57.46	Q
16	Stacey Bowley	South Africa	57.64	Q
17	Ayari Aoyama	Japan	57.65	
18	Anna Lydall	Canada	57.67	Q
18	Barbara Bedford	United States	57.67	
20	Elli Overton	Australia	57.70	
21	Jen Button	Canada	57.80	Q
22	Richelle DePold-Fox	United States	57.97	
23	Toni Jeffs	New Zealand	58.01	
24	Monique Robins	New Zealand	58.07	
25	Ashley Tappin	United States	58.09	
25	Keiko Price	United States	58.09	
27	Kate Godfrey	Australia	58.16	
28	Jenna Gresdal	Canada	58.17	
29	Melanie Dodd	Australia	58.27	
30	Roh Joo-hee	South Korea	58.35	
30	Sarah D'Arcy	Australia	58.35	
32	Deanna Schonwald	New Zealand	58.44	
33	Angela Kennedy	Australia	58.53	
34	Alison Fitch	New Zealand	58.59	
35	Vivienne Rignall	New Zealand	58.64	
36	Janet Cook	Canada	58.69	
37	Sarah Evanetz	Canada	58.71	
37	Renate du Plessis	South Africa	58.71	
39	Karine Chevrier	Canada	58.73	
40	Katie Brambley	Canada	58.92	
41	Kirsten van Heerden	South Africa	59.26	
42	Tsai Shu-min	Chinese Taipei	59.76	
43	Chiang Tzu-ying	Chinese Taipei	1:00.01	
44	Caroline Pickering	Fiji	1:00.14	
45	Sung Yi-chieh	Chinese Taipei	1:00.66	

=== Semifinals ===
The semifinals were held on August 26.

Rank	Name	Nationality	Time	Notes
1	Jenny Thompson	United States	55.48	Q
2	Sarah Ryan	Australia	55.99	Q
3	Suzu Chiba	Japan	56.36	Q
4	Claudia Poll	Costa Rica	56.45	Q
5	Liesl Kolbisen	United States	56.48	Q
6	Rebecca Creedy	Australia	56.50	Q
7	Samantha Arsenault	United States	56.62	
8	Kari Haag-Woodall	United States	56.70	
9	Lori Munz	Australia	56.84	
10	Charlene Wittstock	South Africa	56.85	Q
11	Laura Nicholls	Canada	56.95	Q
12	Jacinta van Lint	Australia	57.03	
13	Stacey Bowley	South Africa	57.11	
14	Jen Button	Canada	57.57	
15	Junko Nakatani	Japan	57.63	
16	Anna Lydall	Canada	57.80	

=== Final ===
The final was held on August 27.

Rank	Lane	Nationality	Time	Notes
1st place, gold medalist(s)	Jenny Thompson	United States	54.89	
2nd place, silver medalist(s)	Sarah Ryan	Australia	55.58	
3rd place, bronze medalist(s)	Rebecca Creedy	Australia	55.90	
4	Laura Nicholls	Canada	55.94	NR
5	Suzu Chiba	Japan	56.11	
6	Liesl Kolbisen	United States	56.20	
7	Claudia Poll	Costa Rica	56.80	
8	Charlene Wittstock	South Africa	57.69	
