= 2002 Pan Pacific Swimming Championships – Women's 4 × 100 metre medley relay =

Women's 4 × 100 metre medley relay at the 2002 Pan Pacific Swimming Championships
- Venue: Yokohama International Swimming Pool
- Dates: August 29, 2002 (heats & finals)
- Winning time: 4:00.50

Medalists
gold medal	Dyana Calub, Leisel Jones, Petria Thomas and Jodie Henry	Australia
silver medal	Natalie Coughlin, Amanda Beard, Jenny Thompson and Lindsay Benko	United States
bronze medal	Erin Gammel, Rhiannon Leier, Jen Button and Laura Nicholls	Canada

The women's 4 × 100 metre medley relay competition at the 2002 Pan Pacific Swimming Championships took place on August 29 at the Yokohama International Swimming Pool. Australia won gold with the previous champion being the United States.

== Records ==
Prior to this competition, the existing world and Pan Pacific records were as follows:

World record	United States (USA); Barbara Bedford (1:01.39); Megan Quann (1:06.29); Jenny Thompson (57.25); Dara Torres (53.37)	3:58.30	Sydney, Australia	September 23, 2000
Pan Pacific Championships record	Australia (AUS); Nicole Livingstone (1:01.95); Samantha Riley (1:07.19); Susie O'Neill (58.82); Sarah Ryan (54.97)	4:02.93	Atlanta, United States	August 13, 1995

== Results ==
All times are in minutes and seconds.

KEY:	q	Fastest non-qualifiers	Q	Qualified	CR	Championships record	NR	National record	PB	Personal best	SB	Seasonal best

=== Heats ===
Heats weren't performed, as only six teams had entered.

=== Final ===
The final was held on August 29.

Rank	Lane	Name	Nationality	Time	Notes
1st place, gold medalist(s)	5	Dyana Calub (1:01.98); Leisel Jones (1:07.51); Petria Thomas (56.94); Jodie Henry (54.07)	Australia	4:00.50	CR
2nd place, silver medalist(s)	4	Natalie Coughlin (1:00.09); Amanda Beard (1:07.76); Jenny Thompson (58.32); Lindsay Benko (54.98)	United States	4:01.15	
3rd place, bronze medalist(s)	6	Erin Gammel (1:02.32); Rhiannon Leier (1:09.22); Jen Button (59.16); Laura Nicholls (54.99)	Canada	4:05.69	
4	3	Noriko Inada (1:01.85); Fumiko Kawanabe (1:10.28); Yuko Nakanishi (59.46); Tomoko Nagai (55.32)	Japan	4:06.91	
5	2	Hannah McLean (1:03.29); Jane Copland (1:14.27); Megan Allan (1:03.08); Alison Fitch (56.33)	New Zealand	4:16.97	
6	7	Sherry Tsai (1:03.75); Ka Lei Liu (1:14.64); Wing Suet Chan (1:04.91); Jennifer Ng (58.95)	Hong Kong	4:22.25	
-	-	-	Singapore	DNS	
