= 1999 Pan Pacific Swimming Championships – Women's 50 metre freestyle =

Coordinates: 33°51′2.2″S 151°4′1″E

Women's 50 metre freestyle at the 1999 Pan Pacific Swimming Championships
- Venue: Sydney International Aquatic Centre
- Dates: August 28, 1999 (heats & semifinals); August 29, 1999 (final)
- Competitors: 30 from 7 nations
- Winning time: 25.51

Medalists
gold medal	Jenny Thompson	United States
silver medal	Sarah Ryan	Australia
bronze medal	Liesl Kolbisen	United States

The women's 50 metre freestyle competition at the 1999 Pan Pacific Swimming Championships took place on August 28–29 at the Sydney International Aquatic Centre. The last champion was Le Jingyi of China.

This race consisted of one length of the pool in freestyle.

== Records ==
Prior to this competition, the existing world and Pan Pacific records were as follows:

World record	Le Jingyi (CHN)	24.51	Rome, Italy	September 11, 1994
Pan Pacific Championships record	Amy Van Dyken (USA)	25.03	Atlanta, United States	August 13, 1995

== Results ==
All times are in minutes and seconds.

KEY:	q	Fastest non-qualifiers	Q	Qualified	CR	Championships record	NR	National record	PB	Personal best	SB	Seasonal best

=== Heats ===
The first round was held on August 28.

Rank	Name	Nationality	Time	Notes
1	Jenny Thompson	United States	25.90	Q
2	Liesl Kolbisen	United States	26.11	Q
3	Kari Haag-Woodall	United States	26.12	Q
4	Anna Lydall	Canada	26.30	Q
5	Toni Jeffs	New Zealand	26.33	Q
6	Laura Nicholls	Canada	26.34	Q
7	Charlene Wittstock	South Africa	26.44	Q
8	Samantha Arsenault	United States	26.50	Q
9	Sarah Ryan	Australia	26.56	Q
10	Ashley Tappin	United States	26.62	
11	Stacey Bowley	South Africa	26.63	Q
12	Rebecca Creedy	Australia	26.69	Q
13	Monique Robins	New Zealand	26.73	Q
14	Vivienne Rignall	New Zealand	26.80	Q
14	Jenna Gresdal	Canada	26.82	Q
16	Melanie Dodd	Australia	26.89	Q
17	Renate du Plessis	South Africa	26.98	Q
18	Lori Munz	Australia	27.00	
19	Jacinta van Lint	Australia	27.02	
20	Keiko Price	United States	27.08	
21	Angela Kennedy	Australia	27.15	
21	Elli Overton	Australia	27.15	
23	Alison Fitch	New Zealand	27.28	
23	Sarah Evanetz	Canada	27.28	
25	Jolie Workman	New Zealand	27.32	
26	Janet Cook	Canada	27.34	
27	Caroline Pickering	Fiji	27.46	
28	Sung Yi-chieh	Chinese Taipei	28.02	
29	Candice Crafford	South Africa	28.13	
30	Candice Nethercott	South Africa	28.78	

=== Semifinals ===
The semifinals were held on August 28.

Rank	Name	Nationality	Time	Notes
1	Jenny Thompson	United States	25.64	Q
2	Liesl Kolbisen	United States	25.74	Q
3	Kari Haag-Woodall	United States	26.05	
4	Toni Jeffs	New Zealand	26.15	Q
5	Charlene Wittstock	South Africa	26.20	Q
6	Laura Nicholls	Canada	26.23	Q
7	Rebecca Creedy	Australia	26.24	Q
8	Anna Lydall	Canada	26.30	Q
9	Sarah Ryan	Australia	26.43	Q
10	Vivienne Rignall	New Zealand	26.61	
11	Stacey Bowley	South Africa	26.62	
12	Samantha Arsenault	United States	26.63	
13	Jenna Gresdal	Canada	26.67	
14	Melanie Dodd	Australia	26.85	
15	Monique Robins	New Zealand	26.94	
16	Renate du Plessis	South Africa	26.96	

=== Final ===
The final was held on August 29.

Rank	Lane	Nationality	Time	Notes
1st place, gold medalist(s)	Jenny Thompson	United States	25.51	
2nd place, silver medalist(s)	Sarah Ryan	Australia	25.95	
3rd place, bronze medalist(s)	Liesl Kolbisen	United States	25.97	
4	Rebecca Creedy	Australia	26.13	
5	Laura Nicholls	Canada	26.16	
6	Charlene Wittstock	South Africa	26.28	
7	Toni Jeffs	New Zealand	26.30	
8	Anna Lydall	Canada	26.58	
