= 2006 Pan Pacific Swimming Championships – Women's 50 metre freestyle =

Women's 50 metre freestyle at the 2006 Pan Pacific Swimming Championships
- Venue: Saanich Commonwealth Place
- Dates: August 20, 2006 (heats & finals)
- Competitors: 35 from 9 nations
- Winning time: 25.10

Medalists
gold medal	Kara Lynn Joyce	United States
silver medal	Natalie Coughlin	United States
bronze medal	Flávia Delaroli	Brazil

The women's 50 metre freestyle competition at the 2006 Pan Pacific Swimming Championships took place on August 20 at the Saanich Commonwealth Place. The last champion was Jenny Thompson of US.

This race consisted of one length of the pool in freestyle.

== Records ==
Prior to this competition, the existing world and Pan Pacific records were as follows:

World record	Inge de Bruijn (NED)	24.13	Sydney, Australia	September 22, 2000
Pan Pacific Championships record	Amy Van Dyken (USA)	25.03	Atlanta, United States	August 13, 1995

== Results ==
All times are in minutes and seconds.

KEY:	q	Fastest non-qualifiers	Q	Qualified	CR	Championships record	NR	National record	PB	Personal best	SB	Seasonal best

=== Heats ===
The first round was held on August 20, at 10:24.

Rank	Heat	Lane	Name	Nationality	Time	Notes
1	4	4	Natalie Coughlin	United States	25.30	QA
2	5	4	Kara Lynn Joyce	United States	25.37	QA
3	4	5	Amanda Weir	United States	25.40	QA
4	3	4	Courtney Cashion	United States	25.41	QA
5	3	5	Lacey Nymeyer	United States	25.59	QA
6	5	3	Rebeca Gusmão	Brazil	25.81	QA
7	5	6	Flávia Delaroli	Brazil	25.84	QA
8	5	5	Michelle Engelsman	Australia	25.86	QA
9	4	3	Melanie Schlanger	Australia	26.03	QB
10	3	3	Dana Vollmer	United States	26.05	QB
11	4	6	Victoria Poon	Canada	26.06	QB
12	5	2	Kaori Yamada	Japan	26.20	QB
13	3	6	Renata Burgos	Brazil	26.25	QB
14	2	2	Hannah McLean	New Zealand	26.26	QB
14	3	1	Kim Dal-Eun	South Korea	26.26	QB
16	2	8	Liz Coster	New Zealand	26.41	?
16	5	7	Hannah Wilson	Hong Kong	26.41	?
18	4	8	Seanna Mitchell	Canada	26.48	
19	5	1	Erica Morningstar	Canada	26.57	
20	3	7	Motomi Nakamura	Japan	26.67	
21	2	3	Leila Vaziri	United States	26.70	
22	4	2	Nieh Pin-Chieh	Chinese Taipei	26.76	
23	2	7	Mary Descenza	United States	26.77	
23	3	2	Alison Fitch	New Zealand	26.77	
25	2	6	Sze Hang Yu	Hong Kong	26.82	
26	2	5	Lee Keo-Ra	South Korea	26.83	
27	2	1	Lauren English	United States	26.87	
28	1	3	Fran Adcock	Australia	26.95	
28	2	4	Kim Vanderberg	United States	26.95	
30	4	1	Lauren Boyle	New Zealand	26.96	
31	1	4	Melanie Bouchard	Canada	27.10	
32	3	8	Kelly Stubbins	Australia	27.17	
33	1	5	Lee Leong Kwai	Hong Kong	27.45	
34	1	6	Kayla Rawlings	Canada	27.66	
35	4	7	Yang Chin-Kuei	Chinese Taipei	27.82	
-	5	8	Emily Wong	Canada	DSQ	

=== B Final ===
The B final was held on August 20, at 18:57.

Rank	Lane	Name	Nationality	Time	Notes
9	4	Amanda Weir	United States	25.25	
10	5	Renata Burgos	Brazil	25.90	
11	6	Hannah McLean	New Zealand	26.04	
12	8	Erica Morningstar	Canada	26.17	
13	3	Kim Dal-Eun	South Korea	26.22	
14	7	Hannah Wilson	Hong Kong	26.24	
15	2	Liz Coster	New Zealand	26.44	
16	1	Seanna Mitchell	Canada	26.54	

=== A Final ===
The A final was held on August 20, at 18:57.

Rank	Lane	Name	Nationality	Time	Notes
1st place, gold medalist(s)	5	Kara Lynn Joyce	United States	25.10	
2nd place, silver medalist(s)	4	Natalie Coughlin	United States	25.32	
3rd place, bronze medalist(s)	6	Flávia Delaroli	Brazil	25.62	
4	3	Rebeca Gusmão	Brazil	25.64	
5	7	Melanie Schlanger	Australia	25.77	
6	2	Michelle Engelsman	Australia	25.89	
7	1	Victoria Poon	Canada	25.97	
8	8	Kaori Yamada	Japan	26.18	
