= 2002 Pan Pacific Swimming Championships – Women's 4 × 200 metre freestyle relay =

Women's 4 × 200 metre freestyle relay at the 2002 Pan Pacific Swimming Championships
- Venue: Yokohama International Swimming Pool
- Dates: August 28, 2002 (heats & finals)
- Winning time: 7:56.96

Medalists
| gold medal | Natalie Coughlin, Mary Hill, Diana Munz and Lindsay Benko | United States |
| silver medal | Petria Thomas, Elka Graham, Giaan Rooney and Alice Mills | Australia |
| bronze medal | Tomoko Nagai, Sachiko Yamada, Norie Urabe and Maki Mita | Japan |

The women's 4 × 200 metre freestyle relay competition at the 2002 Pan Pacific Swimming Championships took place on August 28 at the Yokohama International Swimming Pool. The last champion was the United States.

This race consisted of sixteen lengths of the pool. Each of the four swimmers completed four lengths of the pool. The first swimmer had to touch the wall before the second could leave the starting block.

== Records ==
Prior to this competition, the existing world and Pan Pacific records were as follows:

| World record | East Germany (GDR); Manuela Stellmach (2:00.23); Astrid Strauss (1:58.90); Anke Möhring (1:58.73); Heike Friedrich (1:57.61) | 7:55.47 | Strasbourg, France | August 18, 1987 |
| Pan Pacific Championships record | United States (USA); Lindsay Benko (1:58.86); Ellen Stonebraker (1:59.68); Jenny Thompson (2:00.02); Cristina Teuscher (1:59.05) | 7:57.61 | Sydney, Australia | August 26, 1999 |

== Results ==
All times are in minutes and seconds.

| KEY: | q | Fastest non-qualifiers | Q | Qualified | CR | Championships record | NR | National record | PB | Personal best | SB | Seasonal best |

=== Heats ===
Heats weren't performed, as only seven teams had entered.

=== Final ===
The final was held on August 28.

| Rank | Lane | Name | Nationality | Time | Notes |
|---|---|---|---|---|---|
| 1st place, gold medalist(s) | 6 | Natalie Coughlin (1:58.21); Mary Hill (2:00.92); Diana Munz (1:59.58); Lindsay Benko (1:58.25) | United States | 7:56.96 | CR |
| 2nd place, silver medalist(s) | 4 | Petria Thomas (1:59.77); Elka Graham (1:59.14); Giaan Rooney (1:59.72); Alice Mills (2:00.62) | Australia | 7:59.25 | |
| 3rd place, bronze medalist(s) | 5 | Tomoko Nagai (2:01.60); Sachiko Yamada (2:00.46); Norie Urabe (2:01.85); Maki Mita (2:00.10) | Japan | 8:04.01 | |
| 4 | 3 | Jessica Deglau (2:02.67); Audrey Lacroix (2:03.80); Jen Button (2:02.27); Elizabeth Collins (2:02.42) | Canada | 8:11.16 | |
| 5 | 7 | Monique Ferreira (2:02.16); Mariana Brochado (2:03.08); Denise Oliveira (2:04.20); Nayara Ribeiro (2:06.36) | Brazil | 8:15.80 | |
| 6 | 2 | Alison Fitch (2:01.86); Nathalie Bernard (2:05.25); Rebecca Linton (2:05.62); Helen Norfolk (2:04.66) | New Zealand | 8:17.39 | |
| 7 | 1 | Chan Wing Suet (2:12.88); Shuk Mui Pang (2:11.06); Jennifer Ng (2:10.95); Sherry Tsai (2:08.21) | Hong Kong | 8:43.10 | |
| - | - | - | Singapore | DNS | |
