= 2006 Pan Pacific Swimming Championships – Women's 4 × 200 metre freestyle relay =

Women's 4 × 200 metre freestyle relay at the 2006 Pan Pacific Swimming Championships
- Venue: Saanich Commonwealth Place
- Dates: August 18, 2006 (heats & finals)
- Winning time: 7:54.62

Medalists
| gold medal | Natalie Coughlin, Lacey Nymeyer, Dana Vollmer and Katie Hoff | United States |
| silver medal | Bronte Barratt, Shayne Reese, Kelly Stubbins and Linda Mackenzie | Australia |
| bronze medal | Maki Mita, Norie Urabe, Ai Shibata and Haruka Ueda | Japan |

The women's 4 × 200 metre freestyle relay competition at the 2006 Pan Pacific Swimming Championships took place on August 18 at the Saanich Commonwealth Place. The last champion was the United States.

This race consisted of sixteen lengths of the pool. Each of the four swimmers completed four lengths of the pool. The first swimmer had to touch the wall before the second could leave the starting block.

== Records ==
Prior to this competition, the existing world and Pan Pacific records were as follows:

| World record | Germany (GER); Petra Dallmann (1:59.14); Daniela Samulski (1:58.27); Britta Steffen (1:57.77); Annika Lurz (1:55.64) | 7:50.82 | Budapest, Hungary | August 3, 2006 |
| Pan Pacific Championships record | United States (USA); Natalie Coughlin (1:58.21); Elizabeth Hill (2:00.92); Diana Munz (1:59.58); Lindsay Benko (1:58.25) | 7:56.96 | Yokohama, Japan | August 28, 2002 |

== Results ==
All times are in minutes and seconds.

| KEY: | q | Fastest non-qualifiers | Q | Qualified | CR | Championships record | NR | National record | PB | Personal best | SB | Seasonal best |

=== Heats ===
Heats weren't performed, as only seven teams had entered.

=== Final ===
The final was held on August 18, at 19:58.

| Rank | Lane | Name | Nationality | Time | Notes |
|---|---|---|---|---|---|
| 1st place, gold medalist(s) | 4 | Natalie Coughlin (1:58.37); Lacey Nymeyer (2:00.06); Dana Vollmer (1:58.87); Katie Hoff (1:57.32) | United States | 7:54.62 | CR |
| 2nd place, silver medalist(s) | 5 | Bronte Barratt (1:59.58); Shayne Reese (1:59.46); Kelly Stubbins (2:00.08); Linda Mackenzie (1:58.88) | Australia | 7:58.00 | |
| 3rd place, bronze medalist(s) | 2 | Maki Mita (1:59.61); Norie Urabe (1:59.93); Ai Shibata (1:58.83); Haruka Ueda (2:02.28) | Japan | 8:00.65 | |
| 4 | 3 | Lauren Boyle (2:04.20); Helen Norfolk (2:02.85); Alison Fitch (2:02.98); Melissa Ingram (2:03.17) | New Zealand | 8:13.20 | |
| 5 | 7 | Lee Keo-Ra (2:04.28); Kim Dal-Eun (2:07.41); Jung Yoo-Jin (2:05.44); Lee Ji-Eun (2:03.43) | South Korea | 8:20.56 | |
| 6 | 1 | Hannah Wilson (2:05.79); Tsai Hiu Wai (2:04.93); Lee Leong Kwai (2:13.11); Sze Hang Yu (2:04.32) | Hong Kong | 8:28.15 | |
| - | 6 | Julia Wilkinson (2:01.20); Maya Beaudry (2:00.05); Melanie Bouchard (2:01.65); Brittany Reimer (-) | Canada | DSQ | |
