= Swimming at the 2004 Summer Olympics – Women's 100 metre freestyle =

Women's 100 metre freestyle at the Games of the XXVIII Olympiad
- Venue: Athens Olympic Aquatic Centre
- Date: August 18, 2004 (heats & semifinals); August 19, 2004 (final)
- Competitors: 51 from 45 nations
- Winning time: 53.84

Medalists
1st place, gold medalist(s)		Jodie Henry	Australia
2nd place, silver medalist(s)		Inge de Bruijn	Netherlands
3rd place, bronze medalist(s)		Natalie Coughlin	United States

The women's 100 metre freestyle event at the 2004 Olympic Games was contested at the Olympic Aquatic Centre of the Athens Olympic Sports Complex in Athens, Greece on August 18 and 19.

Australia's Jodie Henry edged out defending Olympic champion Inge de Bruijn to take the gold medal in this event, by thirty-two hundredths of a second (0.32), outside the record time of 53.84 seconds. U.S. swimmer Natalie Coughlin, who previously claimed the title in the 100 m backstroke, earned the bronze at 54.40 seconds. In the semifinals, Henry captured fourteen hundredths of a second (0.14) off her teammate Lisbeth Lenton's world record (set five months earlier in Sydney), with a time of 53.52. This was also the final appearance for de Bruijn at the Olympics, before she retired from her swimming career in 2007.

== Records ==
Prior to this competition, the existing world and Olympic records were as follows.

World record	Lisbeth Lenton (AUS)	53.66	Sydney, Australia	31 March 2004
Olympic record	Inge de Bruijn (NED)	53.77	Sydney, Australia	20 September 2000

The following new world and Olympic records were set during this competition.

Date	Event	Name	Nationality	Time	Record
August 18	Semifinal 2	Jodie Henry	Australia	53.52	WR

== Results ==
=== Heats ===
Rank	Heat	Lane	Name	Nationality	Time	Notes
1	5	4	Inge de Bruijn	Netherlands	54.43	Q
2	5	5	Kara Lynn Joyce	United States	54.53	Q
3	7	5	Natalie Coughlin	United States	54.82	Q
4	7	4	Lisbeth Lenton	Australia	54.89	Q
5	6	3	Malia Metella	France	55.08	Q
6	7	2	Nery Mantey Niangkouara	Greece	55.12	Q
7	6	4	Jodie Henry	Australia	55.13	Q
8	7	6	Martina Moravcová	Slovakia	55.17	Q
9	7	3	Federica Pellegrini	Italy	55.41	Q
10	6	6	Alena Popchanka	Belarus	55.49	Q
11	6	2	Franziska van Almsick	Germany	55.57	Q, WD
12	5	1	Tomoko Nagai	Japan	55.76	Q
13	5	6	Marleen Veldhuis	Netherlands	55.81	Q
14	5	7	Josefin Lillhage	Sweden	55.87	Q
15	4	6	Hanna Shcherba	Belarus	56.01	Q
15	6	5	Hanna-Maria Seppälä	Finland	56.01	Q
17	6	1	Ryu Yoon-ji	South Korea	56.02	Q
18	4	3	Jeanette Ottesen	Denmark	56.17	
19	7	1	Paulina Barzycka	Poland	56.20	
20	6	8	Rebeca Gusmão	Brazil	56.25	
21	4	1	Alison Fitch	New Zealand	56.29	
22	6	7	Cheng Jiaru	China	56.39	
23	7	8	Jana Myšková	Czech Republic	56.59	
24	7	7	Xu Yanwei	China	56.66	
24	5	2	Johanna Sjöberg	Sweden	56.66	
26	4	2	Sara Isaković	Slovenia	56.67	
26	3	7	Dominique Diezi	Switzerland	56.67	
28	5	8	Florencia Szigeti	Argentina	56.71	
29	3	5	Arlene Semeco	Venezuela	57.04	
30	4	8	Eileen Coparropa	Panama	57.09	
31	4	7	Olga Mukomol	Ukraine	57.12	
32	4	5	Anna Gostomelsky	Israel	57.15	
33	3	6	Judith Draxler	Austria	57.29	
34	3	8	Hannah Wilson	Hong Kong	57.33	
35	2	2	Vanessa García	Puerto Rico	57.38	
36	3	3	Lara Heinz	Luxembourg	57.40	
37	4	4	Jana Kolukanova	Estonia	57.45	
38	3	2	Ágnes Mutina	Hungary	58.10	
39	3	1	Angela Chuck	Jamaica	58.33	
40	3	4	Ragnheidur Ragnarsdóttir	Iceland	58.47	
41	2	5	Yelena Skalinskaya	Kazakhstan	58.56	
42	2	4	Linda McEachrane	Trinidad and Tobago	58.92	
43	2	3	Agnese Ozoliņa	Latvia	59.03	
44	2	6	Sung Yi-chieh	Chinese Taipei	59.18	
45	2	7	Irina Shlemova	Uzbekistan	59.21	
46	2	8	Shikha Tandon	India	59.70	
47	2	1	Nicoleta Coica	Moldova	59.85	
48	1	4	Carolina Cerqueda	Andorra	1:00.38	
49	1	5	Larissa Inangorore	Burundi	1:23.90	
50	1	3	Gloria Koussihouede	Benin	1:30.90	
	5	3	Melanie Marshall	Great Britain	DNS	

=== Semifinals ===
==== Semifinal 1 ====
Rank	Lane	Name	Nationality	Time	Notes
1	4	Kara Lynn Joyce	United States	54.81	Q
2	2	Alena Popchanka	Belarus	54.97	Q
3	3	Nery Mantey Niangkouara	Greece	55.02	Q
4	6	Martina Moravcová	Slovakia	55.08	Q
5	5	Lisbeth Lenton	Australia	55.17	
6	7	Marleen Veldhuis	Netherlands	55.32	
7	1	Hanna Shcherba	Belarus	55.67	
8	8	Ryu Yoon-Ji	South Korea	55.85	

==== Semifinal 2 ====
Rank	Lane	Name	Nationality	Time	Notes
1	6	Jodie Henry	Australia	53.52	Q, WR
2	4	Inge de Bruijn	Netherlands	54.06	Q
3	5	Natalie Coughlin	United States	54.37	Q
4	3	Malia Metella	France	54.57	Q
5	2	Federica Pellegrini	Italy	55.30	
6	8	Hanna-Maria Seppälä	Finland	55.59	
7	1	Josefin Lillhage	Sweden	55.76	
8	7	Tomoko Nagai	Japan	56.03	

=== Final ===
Rank	Lane	Swimmer	Nation	Time	Notes
1st place, gold medalist(s)	4	Jodie Henry	Australia	53.84	
2nd place, silver medalist(s)	5	Inge de Bruijn	Netherlands	54.16	
3rd place, bronze medalist(s)	3	Natalie Coughlin	United States	54.40	
4	6	Malia Metella	France	54.50	
5	2	Kara Lynn Joyce	United States	54.54	
6	1	Nery Mantey Niangkouara	Greece	54.81	
7	8	Martina Moravcová	Slovakia	55.12	
8	7	Alena Popchanka	Belarus	55.24	
