= 1999 Pan Pacific Swimming Championships – Women's 4 × 100 metre freestyle relay =

Women's 4 × 100 metre freestyle relay at the 1999 Pan Pacific Swimming Championships
- Venue: Sydney International Aquatic Centre
- Dates: August 22, 1999 (heats & finals)
- Winning time: 3:41.86

Medalists
gold medal	Liesl Kolbisen, Richelle Fox, Lindsay Benko and Jenny Thompson	United States
silver medal	Sarah Ryan, Lori Munz, Rebecca Creedy and Susie O'Neill	Australia
bronze medal	Jessica Deglau, Marianne Limpert, Anna Lydall and Laura Nicholls	Canada

The women's 4 × 100 metre freestyle relay competition at the 1999 Pan Pacific Swimming Championships took place on August 22 at the Sydney International Aquatic Centre. The last champion was the United States.

This race consisted of eight lengths of the pool. Each of the four swimmers completed two lengths of the pool. The first swimmer had to touch the wall before the second could leave the starting block.

== Records ==
Prior to this competition, the existing world and Pan Pacific records were as follows:

World record	China (CHN); Le Jingyi (54.31); Shan Ying (54.38); Le Ying (55.09); Lü Bin (54.13)	3:37.91	Rome, Italy	September 7, 1994
Pan Pacific Championships record	United States (USA); Amy Van Dyken (55.76); Angel Martino (55.58); Melanie Valerio (55.55); Jenny Thompson (54.70)	3:41.59	Atlanta, United States	August 12, 1995

== Results ==
All times are in minutes and seconds.

KEY:	q	Fastest non-qualifiers	Q	Qualified	CR	Championships record	NR	National record	PB	Personal best	SB	Seasonal best

=== Heats ===
Heats weren't performed, as only seven teams had entered.

=== Final ===
The final was held on August 22.

Rank	Name	Nationality	Time	Notes
1st place, gold medalist(s)	Liesl Kolbisen (56.26); Richelle Fox (55.80); Lindsay Benko (55.53); Jenny Thompson (54.27)	United States	3:41.86	
2nd place, silver medalist(s)	Sarah Ryan (56.10); Lori Munz (56.06); Rebecca Creedy (55.87); Susie O'Neill (54.66)	Australia	3:42.69	
3rd place, bronze medalist(s)	Jessica Deglau (56.74); Marianne Limpert (55.80); Anna Lydall (56.24); Laura Nicholls (55.72)	Canada	3:44.50	NR
4	Junko Nakatani (57.61); Ayari Aoyama (56.94); Maki Mita (56.97); Suzu Chiba (56.15)	Japan	3:47.67	
5	Charlene Wittstock (56.95); Stacey Nowley (57.03); Kim van Selm (57.39); Kirsten van Heerden (58.51)	South Africa	3:49.88	
6	Alison Fitch (59.48); Monique Robbins (57.44); Vivienne Rignall (57.32); Deanna Schonwald (58.28)	New Zealand	3:52.52	
7	Chiang Tzu-ying (59.31); Kuan Chia-hsien (59.49); Sung Yi-chieh (59.25); Tsai Shu-min (59.80)	Chinese Taipei	3:57.85	
