= Swimming at the 2005 World Aquatics Championships – Women's 4 × 100 metre freestyle relay =

Women's 4×100m Free Relay at the 2005 FINA World Aquatics Championships
- Dates: July 24, 2005
- Competitors: 14
- Winning time: 3 minutes 37.32 seconds

Medalists
gold medal	Australia
silver medal	Germany
bronze medal	United States

The Women's 4×100 Freestyle Relay event at the 11th FINA World Aquatics Championships swam on 24 July 2005 in Montreal Canada.

At the start of the event, the existing World (WR) and Championships (CR) records were:

- WR: 3:35.94 swum by Australia on 14 August 2004 in Athens, Greece
- CR: 3:37.91 swum by China on 7 September 1994 in Rome, Italy

== Results ==
=== Final ===
Place	Nation	Swimmers	Time	Notes
1	Australia	Jodie Henry (54.45), Alice Mills (53.96), Shayne Reese (55.37), Libby Lenton (53.54)	3:37.32	CR
2	Germany	Petra Dallmann (55.01), Antje Buschschulte (54.37), Annika Liebs (54.66), Daniela Götz (54.20)	3:38.24	
3	USA	Natalie Coughlin (54.31), Kara Lynn Joyce (55.22), Lacey Nymeyer (54.88), Amanda Weir (53.90)	3:38.31	
4	Netherlands	Inge Dekker (54.95), Hinkelien Schreuder (55.56), Chantal Groot (55.52), Marleen Veldhuis (53.34)	3:39.37	
5	France	Solenne Figuès (55.47), Céline Couderc (54.52), Aurore Mongel (55.42), Malia Metella (54.04)	3:39.45	
6	China	Yu Yang (55.95), Ji Li (56.24), Yingwen Zhu (54.31), Jiaying Pang (55.60)	3:42.10	
7	Sweden	Anna-Karin Kammerling (56.67), Josefin Lillhage (54.25), Therese Alshammar (54.81), Gabriella Fagundez (57.20)	3:42.93	
8	New Zealand	Nichola Chellingworth (56.68), Alison Fitch (55.67), Hannah McLean (55.49), Te Rina Taite (57.00)	3:44.84	

=== Preliminaries ===
Rank	Heat+Lane	Nation	Swimmers	Time	Notes
1	H2 L4	Australia	Jodie Henry (55.24), Alice Mills (54.29), Shayne Reese (55.15), Sophie Edington (55.89)	3:40.57	q
2	H2 L3	France	Céline Couderc (55.61), Solenne Figuès (54.97), Aurore Mongel (55.51), Malia Metella (54.75)	3:40.84	q
3	H1 L5	Germany	Petra Dallmann (55.76), Annika Liebs (55.13), Meike Freitag (55.67), Daniela Götz (54.79)	3:41.35	q
4	H2 L5	Netherlands	Chantal Groot (55.76), Femke Heemskerk (56.43), Hinkelien Schreuder (55.62), Marleen Veldhuis (53.74)	3:41.55	q
5	H1 L4	United States	Kara Lynn Joyce (55.23), Emily Silver (55.84), Mary DeScenza (55.65), Lacey Nymeyer (54.92)	3:41.84	q
6	H2 L6	China	Yu Yang (56.06), Ji Li (55.78), Yingwen Zhu (54.48), Jiaying Pang (55.57)	3:41.89	q
7	H1 L3	Sweden	Gabriella Fagundez (56.98), Josefin Lillhage (55.09), Anna-Karin Kammerling (55.77), Therese Alshammar (54.19)	3:42.03	q
8	H2 L2	New Zealand	Nichola Chellingworth (56.58), Alison Fitch (55.60), Hannah McLean (56.06), Georgina Toomey (57.12)	3:45.36	q
9	H1 L2	Japan	Norie Urabe (56.36), Atsumi Yamada (56.79), Kaori Yamada (56.36), Haruka Ueda (56.78)	3:46.29	
10	H1 L6	South Korea	Nam-Eun Lee (57.64), Keo Ra Lee (57.04), Na-Ri Park (57.45), Ji Eun Lee (57.50)	3:49.63	
11	H2 L1	Denmark	Annette Hansen (58.34), Jeanette Ottesen (57.17), Louise Jansen (58.60), Louise Ørnstedt (57.70)	3:51.81	
12	H1 L7	Chinese Taipei	Pin-Chieh Nieh (58.15), Yu-Chia Tong (58.40), Chin-Kuei Yang (58.20), Man-Hsu Lin (59.30)	3:54.05	
13	H2 L7	Singapore	Shu Yong Ho (59.74), Ruth Ho (1:01.29), Lynette Ng (1:00.41), Joscelin Yeo (57.87)	3:59.31	
14	H1 L1	Macau	Man Wai Fong (1:01.65), Weng I Kuan (1:03.24), Sin Ian Lei (1:05.56), Cheok Mei Ma (1:00.24)	4:10.69	
