= Laura Pomeroy =

Canadian swimmer

Personal information
- Full name: Laura Pomeroy
- Nationality: Canadian
- Born: December 19, 1983 (age 42)
- Height: 5 ft 11 in (1.80 m)
- Weight: 157 lb (71 kg)

Sport
- Sport: Swimming
- Strokes: freestyle
- Club: Toronto Swim Club
- College team: Southern Methodist University
- Coach: Byron McDonald and Linda Keifer
Medal record
Commonwealth Games
Bronze medal – third place	2002 Manchester	4×100 m freestyle
- Updated on 16 January 2014

Laura Pomeroy (born 19 December 1983) is a Canadian swimmer.

== Career ==
Pomeroy represented Canada at the 2002 Commonwealth Games in Manchester where she won bronze in the 4 × 100 m freestyle relay alongside Laura Nicholls, Marianne Limpert and Jessica Deglau in 3:45.33. In other results, Pomeroy finished 5th in the 50 m freestyle in 25.99 and 12th in the 100 m freestyle in 57.48.
