= Swimming at the 2002 Commonwealth Games – Women's 4 × 100 metre freestyle relay =

Women's 4 × 100 metre freestyle relay at the 2002 Commonwealth Games
- Venue: Manchester Aquatics Centre
- Dates: 3 August
- Competitors: 24 from 6 nations
- Winning time: 3:40.41

Medalists
gold medal	Alice Mills, Jodie Henry, Petria Thomas, Sarah Ryan	Australia
silver medal	Melanie Marshall, Rosalind Brett, Karen Legg, Karen Pickering	England
bronze medal	Laura Nicholls, Marianne Limpert, Laura Pomeroy, Jessica Deglau	Canada

The women's 4 × 100 metre freestyle relay event at the 2002 Commonwealth Games as part of the swimming programme took place on 3 August at the Manchester Aquatics Centre in Manchester, England.

== Records ==
Prior to this competition, the existing world and games records were as follows.

World record	Germany; Katrin Meissner; Petra Dallmann; Sandra Völker; Franziska van Almsick	3:36.00	Berlin, Germany	29 July 2002
Games record	Australia; Lori Munz; Rebecca Creedy; Sarah Ryan; Susie O'Neill	3:42.61	Kuala Lumpur, Malaysia	

== Results ==
The straight final was held on 3 August at 21:05.

Rank	Lane	Nation	Swimmers	Time	Notes
1st place, gold medalist(s)	4	Australia	Alice Mills; Jodie Henry; Petria Thomas; Sarah Ryan	3:40.41	GR
2nd place, silver medalist(s)	5	England	Melanie Marshall; Rosalind Brett; Karen Legg; Karen Pickering	3:41.47	
3rd place, bronze medalist(s)	6	Canada	Laura Nicholls; Marianne Limpert; Laura Pomeroy; Jessica Deglau	3:45.33	
4	3	Scotland	Samantha McNeilly; Kerry Martin; Karen Nisbet; Alison Sheppard	3:46.08	
5	2	Wales	Catrin Davies; Julia Martin; Mackenzie Howe; Bethan Francis Coole	3:52.00	
6	7	Jamaica	Janelle Atkinson; Tamara Swaby; Mariana Chuck; Angela Chuck	3:56.54	
