= Swimming at the 2006 Commonwealth Games – Women's 4 × 100 metre freestyle relay =

Women's 4 × 100 metre freestyle relay at the 2006 Commonwealth Games
- Venue: Melbourne Sports and Aquatic Centre
- Dates: 20 March 2006
- Competitors: 24 from 6 nations
- Winning time: 3:36.49 GR

Medalists
gold medal	Lisbeth Lenton; Jodie Henry; Alice Mills; Shayne Reese	Australia
silver medal	Melanie Marshall; Rosalind Brett; Amy Smith; Fran Halsall	England
bronze medal	Erica Morningstar; Victoria Poon; Geneviève Saumur; Sophie Simard	Canada

The women's 4 × 100 metre freestyle relay event at the 2006 Commonwealth Games as part of the swimming programme took place on 20 March at the Melbourne Sports and Aquatic Centre in Melbourne, Australia.

== Records ==
Prior to this competition, the existing world and Commonwealth Games records were as follows.

World record	Australia (AUS); Alice Mills (54.75); Lisbeth Lenton (53.57); Petria Thomas (54.67); Jodie Henry (52.95)	3:35.94	Athens, Greece	14 August 2004
Commonwealth record	Australia (AUS); Alice Mills (54.75); Lisbeth Lenton (53.57); Petria Thomas (54.67); Jodie Henry (52.95)	3:35.94	Athens, Greece	14 August 2004
Games record	Australia	3:40.41	Manchester, England	3 August 2002

The following records were established during the competition:

Date	Event	Nation	Swimmers	Time	Record
20 March	Final	Australia	Lisbeth Lenton (53.74); Jodie Henry (53.30); Alice Mills (54.42); Shayne Reese (55.03)	3:36.49	GR

== Results ==
Rank	Lane	Nation	Swimmers	Time	Notes
1st place, gold medalist(s)	4	Australia	Lisbeth Lenton (53.74); Jodie Henry (53.30); Alice Mills (54.42); Shayne Reese (55.03)	3:36.49	GR
2nd place, silver medalist(s)	3	England	Melanie Marshall (55.24); Rosalind Brett (55.22); Amy Smith (57.22); Fran Halsall (55.01)	3:42.69	
3rd place, bronze medalist(s)	5	Canada	Erica Morningstar (55.63); Victoria Poon (56.24); Geneviève Saumur (54.85); Sophie Simard (56.12)	3:42.84	
4	2	New Zealand	Lauren Boyle (56.02); Alison Fitch (55.85); Helen Norfolk (56.17); Hannah McLean (55.45)	3:43.49	
5	6	South Africa	Lize-Mari Retief (57.39); Lauren Roets (55.07); Marielle Rogers (57.65); Kirsten van Heerden (57.88)	3:47.99	
6	7	Singapore	Hiang Yuet Ng (59.38); Joscelin Yeo (56.45); Shu Yong Ho (59.18); Chui Bin Ong (59.14)	3:54.15	
