= 1999 Pan Pacific Swimming Championships – Women's 4 × 100 metre medley relay =

Swimming event

Women's 4 × 100 metre medley relay at the 1999 Pan Pacific Swimming Championships
- Venue: Sydney International Aquatic Centre
- Dates: August 29, 1999 (heats & finals)
- Winning time: 4:03.09

Medalists
gold medal	Barbara Bedford, Megan Quann, Jenny Thompson and Liesl Kolbisen	United States
silver medal	Dyana Calub, Samantha Riley, Susie O'Neill and Sarah Ryan	Australia
bronze medal	Mai Nakamura, Masami Tanaka, Ayari Aoyama and Suzu Chiba	Japan

The women's 4 × 100 metre medley relay competition at the 1999 Pan Pacific Swimming Championships took place on August 29 at the Sydney International Aquatic Centre. The last champion was the United States.

== Records ==
Prior to this competition, the existing world and Pan Pacific records were as follows:

World record	China (CHN); He Cihong (1:00.16); Dai Guohong (1:09.04); Liu Limin (58.66); Le Jingyi (53.81)	4:01.67	Rome, Italy	September 10, 1994
Pan Pacific Championships record	Australia (AUS); Nicole Livingstone (1:01.95); Samantha Riley (1:07.19); Susie O'Neill (58.82); Sarah Ryan (54.97)	4:02.93	Atlanta, United States	August 13, 1995

== Results ==
All times are in minutes and seconds.

KEY:	q	Fastest non-qualifiers	Q	Qualified	CR	Championships record	NR	National record	PB	Personal best	SB	Seasonal best

=== Heats ===
Heats weren't performed, as only seven teams had entered.

=== Final ===
The final was held on August 29.

Rank	Name	Nationality	Time	Notes
1st place, gold medalist(s)	Barbara Bedford (1:01.53); Megan Quann (1:07.55); Jenny Thompson (58.00); Liesl Kolbisen (56.01)	United States	4:03.09	
2nd place, silver medalist(s)	Dyana Calub (1:02.24); Samantha Riley (1:09.35); Susie O'Neill (58.87); Sarah Ryan (55.28)	Australia	4:05.74	
3rd place, bronze medalist(s)	Mai Nakamura (1:01.68); Masami Tanaka (1:09.57); Ayari Aoyama (1:00.26); Suzu Chiba (55.63)	Japan	4:07.14	
4	Charlene Wittstock (1:03.81); Penelope Heyns (1:06.69); Amanda Loots (1:00.62); Stacey Bowley (56.62)	South Africa	4:07.74	
5	Erin Gammel (1:02.83); Lauren van Oosten (1:10.77); Jessica Deglau (1:00.42); Laura Nicholls (55.49)	Canada	4:09.51	
6	Choi Soo-min (1:04.22); Kye Yoon-hee (1:14.08); Cho Hee-yeon (1:01.26); Roh Joo-hee (58.61)	South Korea	4:18.17	
7	Nikki Tanner (1:04.44); Jolie Workman (1:13.51); Elizabeth Van Welie (1:04.05); Monique Robbins (57.65)	New Zealand	4:19.65	
