= Melanie Dodd =

Australian swimmer

Personal information
- Full name: Melanie Dodd
- Nickname: "Mel"
- National team: Australia
- Born: 10 May 1973 (age 53) Sydney
- Height: 1.75 m (5 ft 9 in)
- Weight: 67 kg (148 lb)

Sport
- Sport: Swimming
- Strokes: Freestyle
- Club: Australian Institute of Sport
- Coach: Gennadi Touretski
Medal record
Women's swimming
Representing Australia
World Championships (SC)
Silver medal – second place	1995 Rio de Janeiro	4×100 m freestyle
Bronze medal – third place	1999 Hong Kong	4×100 m freestyle

Melanie Dodd (born 10 May 1973) is an Australian former swimmer who specialized in sprint freestyle events. She represented the host nation Australia, as a 27-year-old, at the 2000 Summer Olympics, and also trained for the Australian Institute of Sport, under Russian-based swim coach Gennadi Touretski. She won two medals, a silver and bronze, in the 4×100-metre freestyle relay at the 1995 FINA Short Course World Championships in Rio de Janeiro, and 1999 FINA Short Course World Championships in Hong Kong.

Dodd competed only in the women's 4×100-metre freestyle relay at the 2000 Summer Olympics in Sydney. On the first night of the Games, the Aussie team pulled off a sixth-place finish in the final with a time of 3:40.91. Teaming with Sarah Ryan, Elka Graham and Giaan Rooney in heat two on the morning prelims, Dodd swam the third leg and recorded a split of 56.31 to post a fifth-seeded time of 3:43.56 for the home squad.
