= Linda McEachrane =

Trinidad and Tobago swimmer (born 1983)

Personal information
- Full name: Linda Dawn McEachrane
- National team: Trinidad and Tobago
- Born: 7 September 1983 (age 42) Port of Spain, Trinidad and Tobago
- Height: 1.68 m (5 ft 6 in)
- Weight: 61 kg (134 lb)

Sport
- Sport: Swimming
- Strokes: Freestyle
- Club: Marlins Swim Club
- College team: Tulane University (U.S.)
- Coach: Edward Tuberoso (U.S.)

Linda Dawn McEachrane (born September 7, 1983) is a former swimmer from Trinidad and Tobago, who specialized in sprint freestyle events. She is a 2004 USA Freshman Swimmer of the Year, and is named 2002 National Sportswoman of the Year by the Trinidad & Tobago Olympic Committee. McEachrane is also a former varsity swimmer for Tulane Green Wave, and a business graduate at Tulane University in New Orleans, Louisiana (2006).

McEachrane qualified for the women's 100 m freestyle at the 2004 Summer Olympics in Athens, by posting a FINA B-standard entry time of 58.00 from a TTOC sanctioned time trial in Port of Spain. She challenged seven other swimmers on the second heat, including three-time Olympian Agnese Ozoliņa of Latvia. McEachrane cruised to third place by 0.36 of a second behind Kazakhstan's Yelena Skalinskaya in 58.92. McEachrane failed to advance into the semifinals, as she placed forty-second overall in the preliminaries.

Six years after graduating from the University, McEachrane was officially inducted to the Tulane Athletics Hall of Fame for her full commitment and dedication to the sport of swimming.
