= Kara Lynn Joyce =

American swimmer

Personal information
- National team: United States
- Born: Kara Lynn Joyce; October 25, 1985 (age 40) Brooklyn, New York, U.S.
- Height: 6 ft 0 in (183 cm)
- Weight: 154 lb (70 kg)

Sport
- Sport: Swimming
- Strokes: Freestyle
- Club: SwimMAC Carolina
- College team: University of Georgia
Medal record
Women's swimming
Representing the United States
Olympic Games
Silver medal – second place	2004 Athens	4×100 m freestyle
Silver medal – second place	2004 Athens	4×100 m medley
Silver medal – second place	2008 Beijing	4×100 m freestyle
Silver medal – second place	2008 Beijing	4×100 m medley
World Championships (LC)
Gold medal – first place	2007 Melbourne	4×200 m freestyle
Silver medal – second place	2007 Melbourne	4×100 m freestyle
Silver medal – second place	2011 Shanghai	4×100 m freestyle
Bronze medal – third place	2005 Montreal	4×100 m freestyle
World Championships (SC)
Gold medal – first place	2004 Indianapolis	4×100 m freestyle
Silver medal – second place	2004 Indianapolis	4×100 m medley
Silver medal – second place	2010 Dubai	4×100 m freestyle
Pan Pacific Championships
Gold medal – first place	2006 Victoria	50 m freestyle
Gold medal – first place	2006 Victoria	4×100 m freestyle
Pan American Games
Gold medal – first place	2003 Sto Domingo	50 m freestyle

Kara Lynn Joyce (born October 25, 1985), is an American former competition swimmer and four-time Olympic silver medalist. She competed as a member of the United States Olympic Team at the 2004, 2008 and 2012 Olympics.

== Early years ==
Joyce was born in Brooklyn, New York. She split her high school years between Irondequoit, New York at Eastridge High School, Webster, New York and Ann Arbor, Michigan, where the family relocated to in 2001. It was in Ann Arbor that Joyce began training with Club Wolverine under Jon Urbanchek. Joyce also chose to compete for her high school team, the Ann Arbor Pioneers. In her senior year of high school, she set five Michigan high school state records, four of which were national high school records at the time. (Her state records are in the 50-yard, 100-yard and 200-yard freestyle as well as the 200-yard and 400-yard freestyle relays. While only able to swim a total of four events, Joyce set the 50-yard freestyle record by leading-off the 200-yard freestyle relay.)

In total, Joyce broke five national high school records.

== College career ==
Joyce attended the University of Georgia (UGA), where she swam for coach Jack Bauerle's Georgia Bulldogs swimming and diving team in National Collegiate Athletic Association (NCAA) and Southeastern Conference (SEC) competition from 2004 to 2007. During her first year, Joyce won two individual NCAA championships (50-meter and 100-meter freestyle, short course), and helped Georgia to its third consecutive national runner-up finish. As a sophomore, she along with junior Mary DeScenza led Georgia to its first NCAA Women's Swimming and Diving Championship in four years and defended her individual titles in the 50-yard and 100-yard freestyle, as well as adding a fourth place in the 200-yard freestyle. Joyce was also a key swimmer on four of Georgia's five NCAA Championship relays. En route to their victory, the Bulldogs became the first team in NCAA swimming history to win all five relays.

During the 2006 NCAA Championships, contested at UGA's Gabrielsen Natatorium, Joyce led the Bulldogs to a second-place finish with five NCAA titles and Swimmer of the Year honors. On the first day of the meet, she broke the American record in the 50-yard freestyle, previously held by former Bulldog Maritza Correia. Joyce defended her 100-yard freestyle title and added to that with a win in the 200-yard freestyle. By winning all three, she became the first swimmer in the 25-year history of the Women's NCAA Championships to win the 50-yard, 100-yard, and 200-yard freestyle events.

Joyce earned All-American honors three consecutive years. She was the recipient of the 2006–07 Honda Sports Award for Swimming and Diving, recognizing her as the outstanding college female swimmer of the year.

== International career ==
=== 2004 Athens Summer Olympics ===
At the 2004 Summer Olympics, Joyce earned a pair of silver medals as a member of the 4×100-meter freestyle and the 4×100-meter medley relays. In her individual events, Joyce finished fifth in both the 50-meter and 100-meter freestyle races.

=== 2005 World Aquatics Championships ===
At the 2005 World Aquatics Championships, Joyce received a bronze medal competing in 4×100-meter freestyle relay.

=== 2008 Beijing Summer Olympics ===
At the 2008 Beijing Olympics, Joyce once again earned a pair of silver medals as a member of the 4×100-meter freestyle and the 4×100-meter medley relays. In her individual event, Joyce finished sixth in the 50-meter freestyle.

=== 2012 Summer Olympics ===
At the 2012 United States Olympic Trials in Omaha, Nebraska, the qualifying meet for the U.S. Olympic team, Joyce qualified for her third Olympics by finishing second in the 50-meter freestyle with a time of 24.73 seconds. Additionally, she placed 18th in the heats of the 100-meter freestyle.

At the 2012 Summer Olympics in London, Joyce posted a time 25.28 seconds in Heat 8 of the 50-meter freestyle, forcing her into a swim-off with two other competitors for the sixteenth and final spot in the 50-meter semi-finals. Spurred on by the home crowd, British competitor Amy Smith won the swimoff with a time of 24.82, ending Joyce's participation in the event.

== See also ==
- Georgia Bulldogs
- List of Olympic medalists in swimming (women)
- List of United States records in swimming
- List of University of Georgia people
- List of World Aquatics Championships medalists in swimming (women)
- "Touch the Wall" (2014 documentary film about Kara Lynn Joyce and Missy Franklin in their training to the 2012 Summer Olympics)
