= Shayne Reese =

Australian swimmer (born 1982)

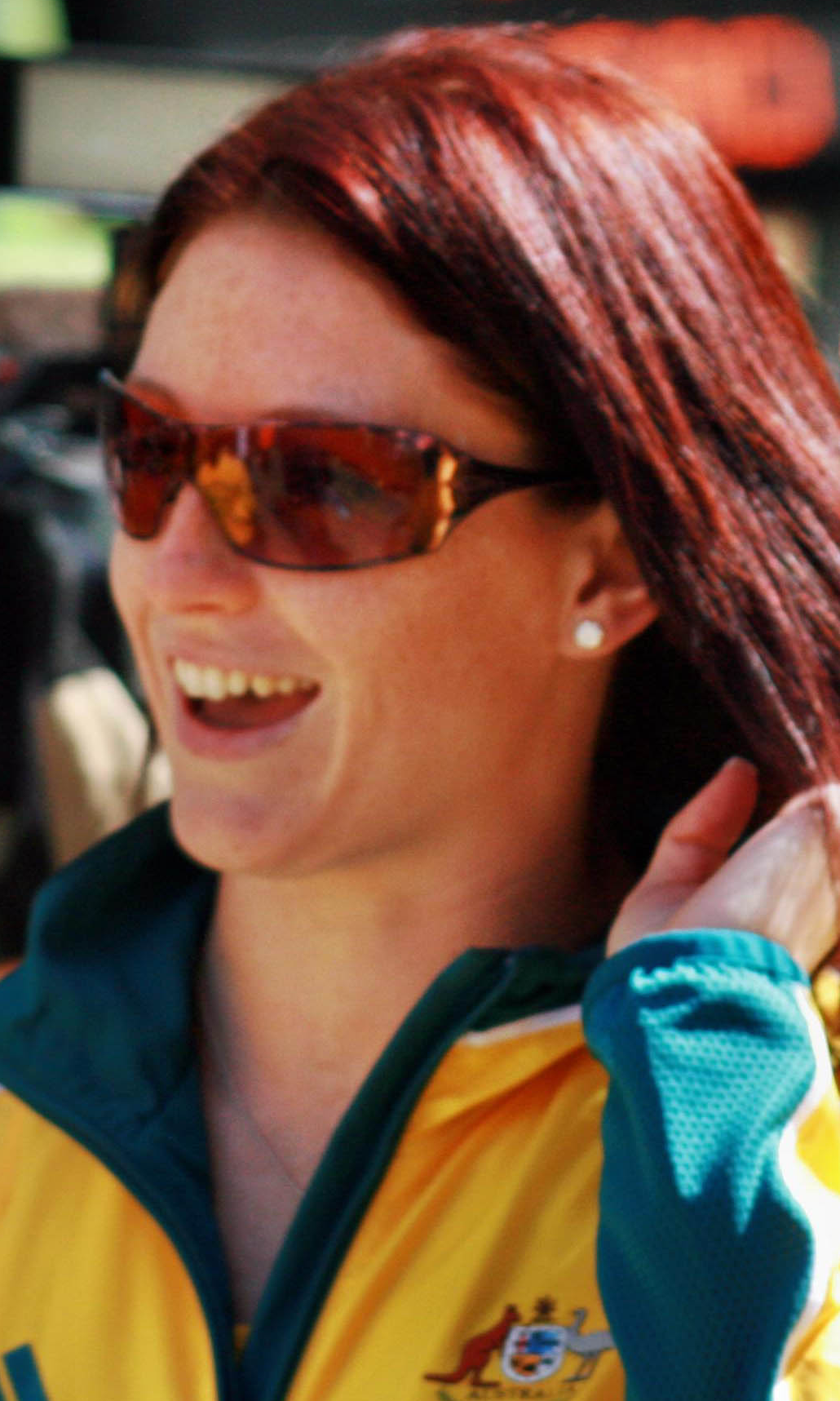

Personal information
- Full name: Shayne Leanne Reese
- National team: Australia
- Born: 15 September 1982 (age 43) Ballarat, Victoria
- Height: 1.68 m (5 ft 6 in)
- Weight: 62 kg (137 lb)

Sport
- Sport: Swimming
- Strokes: Freestyle, medley
- Club: Carey Aquatic
Medal record
Women's swimming
Representing Australia
Olympic Games
| Gold medal – first place | 2008 Beijing | 4×100 m medley |
| Bronze medal – third place | 2008 Beijing | 4×100 m freestyle |
World Championships (LC)
| Gold medal – first place | 2005 Montreal | 4×100 m freestyle |
| Gold medal – first place | 2007 Melbourne | 4×100 m freestyle |
| Silver medal – second place | 2005 Montreal | 4×200 m freestyle |
| Silver medal – second place | 2009 Rome | 4×100 m medley |
| Bronze medal – third place | 2009 Rome | 4×100 m freestyle |
World Championships (SC)
| Gold medal – first place | 2006 Shanghai | 4×200 m freestyle |
| Gold medal – first place | 2008 Manchester | 100 m medley |
| Silver medal – second place | 2004 Indianapolis | 100 m medley |
| Silver medal – second place | 2004 Indianapolis | 4×200 m freestyle |
| Silver medal – second place | 2006 Shanghai | 4×100 m freestyle |
| Bronze medal – third place | 2004 Indianapolis | 4×100 m freestyle |
Pan Pacific Championships
| Silver medal – second place | 2006 Victoria | 4×200 m freestyle |
| Bronze medal – third place | 2006 Victoria | 4×100 m freestyle |
Commonwealth Games
| Gold medal – first place | 2006 Melbourne | 4×100 m freestyle |

Shayne Leanne Reese, OAM (born 15 September 1982) is an Australian medley and freestyle swimmer.

She competed in the 4×200-metre freestyle relay at the 2004 Summer Olympics, in which Australia placed fourth.

She was a member of the Australian 4×100-metre freestyle relay team since 2005, thereby participating in a quartet that won gold at the World Championships in 2005 and 2007 and the 2006 Commonwealth Games.

At the 2008 Australian Swimming Championships she qualified as a member of the 4×100-metre freestyle relay team.

== See also ==
- List of Olympic medalists in swimming (women)
- List of World Aquatics Championships medalists in swimming (women)
- List of Commonwealth Games medallists in swimming (women)
- World record progression 4 × 100 metres freestyle relay
