= Jenny Thompson =

American swimmer (born 1973)

Personal information
- Full name: Jennifer Beth Thompson
- National team: United States
- Born: February 26, 1973 (age 53) Danvers, Massachusetts, U.S.
- Height: 5 ft 9.5 in (177 cm)
- Weight: 152 lb (69 kg)

Sport
- Sport: Swimming
- Strokes: Butterfly, freestyle
- Club: Seacoast Swimming Association, Stanford, Badger Swim Club
- College team: Stanford University
Medal record
Women's swimming
Representing United States
| Event | 1st | 2nd | 3rd |
|---|---|---|---|
| Olympic Games | 8 | 3 | 1 |
| World Championships (LC) | 7 | 5 | 2 |
| World Championships (SC) | 11 | 5 | 2 |
| Pan Pacific Championships | 25 | 7 | 2 |
| Pan American Games | 2 | 0 | 1 |
| Total | 53 | 20 | 8 |
Olympic Games
| Gold medal – first place | 1992 Barcelona | 4×100 m freestyle |
| Gold medal – first place | 1992 Barcelona | 4×100 m medley |
| Gold medal – first place | 1996 Atlanta | 4×100 m freestyle |
| Gold medal – first place | 1996 Atlanta | 4×200 m freestyle |
| Gold medal – first place | 1996 Atlanta | 4×100 m medley |
| Gold medal – first place | 2000 Sydney | 4×100 m freestyle |
| Gold medal – first place | 2000 Sydney | 4×200 m freestyle |
| Gold medal – first place | 2000 Sydney | 4×100 m medley |
| Silver medal – second place | 1992 Barcelona | 100 m freestyle |
| Silver medal – second place | 2004 Athens | 4×100 m freestyle |
| Silver medal – second place | 2004 Athens | 4×100 m medley |
| Bronze medal – third place | 2000 Sydney | 100 m freestyle |
World Championships (LC)
| Gold medal – first place | 1991 Perth | 4×100 m freestyle |
| Gold medal – first place | 1998 Perth | 100 m freestyle |
| Gold medal – first place | 1998 Perth | 100 m butterfly |
| Gold medal – first place | 1998 Perth | 4×100 m freestyle |
| Gold medal – first place | 1998 Perth | 4×100 m medley |
| Gold medal – first place | 2003 Barcelona | 100 m butterfly |
| Gold medal – first place | 2003 Barcelona | 4×100 m freestyle |
| Silver medal – second place | 1994 Rome | 4×100 m freestyle |
| Silver medal – second place | 1994 Rome | 4×100 m medley |
| Silver medal – second place | 1998 Perth | 4×200 m freestyle |
| Silver medal – second place | 2003 Barcelona | 50 m butterfly |
| Silver medal – second place | 2003 Barcelona | 4×100 m medley |
| Bronze medal – third place | 1994 Rome | 4×200 m freestyle |
| Bronze medal – third place | 2003 Barcelona | 100 m freestyle |
World Championships (SC)
| Gold medal – first place | 1997 Gothenburg | 100 m freestyle |
| Gold medal – first place | 1997 Gothenburg | 100 m butterfly |
| Gold medal – first place | 1997 Gothenburg | 4×100 m medley |
| Gold medal – first place | 1999 Hong Kong | 100 m freestyle |
| Gold medal – first place | 1999 Hong Kong | 50 m butterfly |
| Gold medal – first place | 1999 Hong Kong | 100 m butterfly |
| Gold medal – first place | 1999 Hong Kong | 4×100 m medley |
| Gold medal – first place | 2000 Athens | 50 m butterfly |
| Gold medal – first place | 2000 Athens | 100 m butterfly |
| Gold medal – first place | 2004 Indianapolis | 50 m butterfly |
| Gold medal – first place | 2004 Indianapolis | 4×100 m freestyle |
| Silver medal – second place | 1997 Gothenburg | 50 m freestyle |
| Silver medal – second place | 1999 Hong Kong | 50 m freestyle |
| Silver medal – second place | 2000 Athens | 100 m freestyle |
| Silver medal – second place | 2000 Athens | 4×200 m freestyle |
| Silver medal – second place | 2004 Indianapolis | 4×100 m medley |
| Bronze medal – third place | 2000 Athens | 4×100 m medley |
| Bronze medal – third place | 2004 Indianapolis | 100 m butterfly |
Pan Pacific Championships
| Gold medal – first place | 1989 Tokyo | 50 m freestyle |
| Gold medal – first place | 1989 Tokyo | 4×100 m freestyle |
| Gold medal – first place | 1991 Edmonton | 50 m freestyle |
| Gold medal – first place | 1991 Edmonton | 4×100 m freestyle |
| Gold medal – first place | 1993 Kobe | 50 m freestyle |
| Gold medal – first place | 1993 Kobe | 100 m freestyle |
| Gold medal – first place | 1993 Kobe | 100 m butterfly |
| Gold medal – first place | 1993 Kobe | 4×100 m freestyle |
| Gold medal – first place | 1993 Kobe | 4×200 m freestyle |
| Gold medal – first place | 1993 Kobe | 4×100 m medley |
| Gold medal – first place | 1995 Atlanta | 100 m freestyle |
| Gold medal – first place | 1995 Atlanta | 4×100 m freestyle |
| Gold medal – first place | 1995 Atlanta | 4×200 m freestyle |
| Gold medal – first place | 1997 Fukuoka | 100 m freestyle |
| Gold medal – first place | 1997 Fukuoka | 100 m butterfly |
| Gold medal – first place | 1997 Fukuoka | 4×100 m freestyle |
| Gold medal – first place | 1997 Fukuoka | 4×200 m freestyle |
| Gold medal – first place | 1997 Fukuoka | 4×100 m medley |
| Gold medal – first place | 1999 Sydney | 50 m freestyle |
| Gold medal – first place | 1999 Sydney | 100 m freestyle |
| Gold medal – first place | 1999 Sydney | 100 m butterfly |
| Gold medal – first place | 1999 Sydney | 4×100 m freestyle |
| Gold medal – first place | 1999 Sydney | 4×200 m freestyle |
| Gold medal – first place | 1999 Sydney | 4×100 m medley |
| Gold medal – first place | 2002 Yokohama | 50 m freestyle |
| Silver medal – second place | 1989 Tokyo | 100 m freestyle |
| Silver medal – second place | 1995 Atlanta | 50 m freestyle |
| Silver medal – second place | 1995 Atlanta | 100 m butterfly |
| Silver medal – second place | 1995 Atlanta | 4×100 m medley |
| Silver medal – second place | 1997 Fukuoka | 50 m freestyle |
| Silver medal – second place | 2002 Yokohama | 4×100 m freestyle |
| Silver medal – second place | 2002 Yokohama | 4×100 m medley |
| Bronze medal – third place | 2002 Yokohama | 100 m freestyle |
| Bronze medal – third place | 2002 Yokohama | 100 m butterfly |
Pan American Games
| Gold medal – first place | 1987 Indianapolis | 50 m freestyle |
| Gold medal – first place | 1987 Indianapolis | 4×100 m freestyle |
| Bronze medal – third place | 1987 Indianapolis | 100 m freestyle |

Jennifer Beth Thompson (born February 26, 1973) is an American former competition swimmer.

She is one of the most decorated Olympians in history: twelve medals, including eight gold medals, in the 1992, 1996, 2000, and 2004 Summer Olympics.

Thompson, a Massachusetts native who calls Dover, New Hampshire, her hometown, began swimming at age 7 at a summer country club called Cedardale in Groveland, Massachusetts. During the indoor season, she swam at the Danvers YMCA from ages 8 to 10, and then at the Andover-North Andover YMCA from the ages of 10 to 12. At age 12 she began swimming for Seacoast Swimming Association under coaches Amy and Mike Parratto, and moved to Dover at age 13.

She first appeared on the international scene as a 14-year-old in 1987, when she won the 50-meter freestyle and placed third in the 100-meter freestyle at the Pan American Games. She won her first world championship in 1991, as part of the USA's winning 4×100-meter freestyle relay team, and held the world record in the 50-meter and 100-meter freestyle when she participated in the 1992 Summer Olympics in Barcelona.

Thompson attended Stanford University, and swam for the Stanford Cardinal swimming and diving team in National Collegiate Athletic Association (NCAA) and Pacific-10 Conference competition. She was the recipient of the 1994–95 Honda Sports Award for Swimming and Diving, recognizing her as the outstanding college female swimmer of the year.

In 2006, Thompson received a medical degree from the Columbia University College of Physicians and Surgeons, completed a residency in anesthesiology at the Brigham and Women's Hospital in Boston, Massachusetts, and then a fellowship in pediatric anesthesiology at Children's Hospital of Boston.

== World competitions and records ==
=== 1992 Olympics ===
Thought to be at the height of her competitive career at the time, Thompson was expected to win up to five gold medals at those Olympics. However, she failed to qualify for the final in the 200-meter freestyle, finished a disappointing fifth in the 50-meter, and finished second in the 100-meter, where she was beaten by Zhuang Yong of China. Thompson won two gold medals as part of the 4×100-meter freestyle and 4×100-meter medley teams. Considerable controversy was raised after the 100-meter freestyle when the U.S. team speculated on the loose doping policy standards in Barcelona—at that time the event winner did not have a mandatory doping test—only the second and fourth-place finishers were tested, based on a random draw. Thompson and her teammates believed that the Olympic champion should be tested and that rule was changed a few months later when nine members of the Chinese swimming team tested positive for steroid use.

=== University years ===
Thompson continued her career as a member of the U.S. national team and a member of the Stanford University swimming team, and continued to rank among the world's best swimmers for the next four years. During Thompson's four years at Stanford, she was a member of four NCAA championship teams, considered to be some of the most dominant collegiate teams in NCAA history. During that time, Thompson amassed nineteen individual and relay NCAA titles. She competed as a member of the USA Finswimming Team at the 8th World Championship held in Hungary during August 1996. Thompson had a poor performance at the 1996 Olympic Trials which kept her from qualifying in her individual events.

=== 1996 Olympics ===
Thompson won Gold medals on three relay teams at the Olympics; the 4×100-meter freestyle, 4×100-meter medley, and 4×200-meter freestyle.

Between 1997 and 1999, Thompson won eight more world championship titles, including three in a row in the 100-meter freestyle.

=== 2000 Olympics ===
At the 2000 Summer Olympics in Sydney, Australia she won a bronze in the 100-meter freestyle and was fifth in the 100-meter butterfly. But in the relay events, she swam the anchor leg in helping the USA defend its titles in the 4×100-meter freestyle and the 4×200-meter freestyle relays. She also swam the butterfly leg in the winning 4×100-meter relays. The 4×100-meter freestyle and medley teams set new world records in the process.

=== 2000 through 2004 ===
At the World Championships that year, she broke the world record in the 100-meter butterfly for the fourth time, winning a qualifying heat in a time of 56.56 en route to a gold medal in the event. Thompson seemingly retired from competition after the 2000 season with 10 Olympic medals, eight gold, one silver and one bronze, and 12 gold medals at World Championships. In 2001, Thompson moved to New York City to begin studying at the Columbia University College of Physicians and Surgeons. However, while attending medical school, she made a return to competition at the 2002 Pan Pacific Swimming Championships in Yokohama, Japan. Thompson won five medals in two days, setting a career-best time in winning the 50-meter freestyle. At the 2003 World Championships, she would win five medals, including two gold medals.

=== 2004 Olympics ===
At age 31, Thompson was the oldest member of the 2004 U.S. Swimming and Diving team, competing in her fourth Olympics in Athens, Greece. She was the anchor member of the 400-meter freestyle relay, where she contributed to a national record of 3:36.39 and a silver medal. She earned another silver medal as a member of the 4×100-meter medley relay. During her Olympic career, Thompson won twelve medals, eight of which were relay gold; the most for any female Olympic swimmer in history.

== Recent life and work ==
In 2006, Thompson received a medical degree from the Columbia University College of Physicians and Surgeons. She did her internship at the New York City Memorial Sloan-Kettering Cancer Center, and residency anesthesiologist at the Brigham and Women's Hospital in Boston. In June 2010, she was assaulted when two men attempted to steal her scooter, but she was able to fight off both of her attackers.

Thompson married Daniel Richard Cumpelik on September 5, 2010.

Thompson has volunteered as a celebrity swimmer for Swim Across America, a charitable organization that raises money for cancer research, since 1995.

== Accolades and other recognition ==
She was the 1993 and 1998 USA Swimming Swimmer of the Year, and ranked as the 62nd greatest female athlete of all time in a 1999 poll conducted by Sports Illustrated. She was named by Swimming World Magazine as the Female World Swimmer of the Year in 1998, and as Female American Swimmer of the Year in 1993, 1998 and 1999. She was the Women's Sports Foundation's Athlete of the Year in 2000.

Her adopted hometown of Dover, New Hampshire has a public swimming pool named in her honor.

== See also ==
- List of multiple Olympic gold medalists
- List of multiple Olympic gold medalists at a single Games
- List of multiple Olympic gold medalists in one event
- List of multiple Olympic medalists
- List of multiple Summer Olympic medalists
- List of Stanford University people
- List of top Olympic gold medalists in swimming
- List of World Aquatics Championships medalists in swimming (women)
- World record progression 50 metres butterfly
- World record progression 100 metres butterfly
- World record progression 100 metres freestyle
- World record progression 100 metres individual medley
- World record progression 4 × 100 metres freestyle relay
- World record progression 4 × 100 metres medley relay

Records
| Preceded by Kristin Otto | Women's 100-meter freestyle world record-holder (long course); March 1, 1992 – September 5, 1994 | Succeeded by Jingyi Le |
| Preceded by Ayari Aoyama | Women's 100-meter butterfly world record-holder (short course); April 19, 1997 – January 26, 2002 | Succeeded by Martina Moravcová |
| Preceded by Misty Hyman | Women's 50-meter butterfly world record-holder (short course); November 29, 1997 – December 10, 1999 | Succeeded by Anna-Karin Kammerling |
| Preceded by Martina Moravcová; Martina Moravcová | Women's 100-meter individual medley world record-holder (short course); January 16, 1999 – April 2, 1999; April 2, 1999 – November 23, 2002 | Succeeded by Martina Moravcová; Natalie Coughlin |
| Preceded by Mary T. Meagher | Women's 100-meter butterfly world record-holder (long course); August 23, 1999 – May 27, 2000 | Succeeded by Inge de Bruijn |
Awards and achievements
| Preceded by Claudia Poll | Swimming World; World Swimmer of the Year; 1998 | Succeeded by Penny Heyns |
| Preceded by Summer Sanders; Kristine Quance | Swimming World; American Swimmer of the Year; 1993; 1998–1999 | Succeeded by Allison Wagner; Brooke Bennett |
Olympic Games
| Preceded by Carl Osburn | Most career Olympic medals by an American; 2004–2008 | Succeeded by Michael Phelps |
| Preceded by Mark Spitz | Most career Olympic medals by an American; 2004–2008 | Succeeded by Michael Phelps |
| Preceded by Matt Biondi | Most career Olympic medals by an American; 2004–2008 | Succeeded by Michael Phelps |
| Preceded by Shirley Babashoff | Most career Olympic medals by an American woman 2000-2024 | Succeeded by Katie Ledecky |
