= Jodie Henry =

Australian swimmer (born 1983)

Jodie Henry OAM
Personal information
- Full name: Jodie Clare Henry
- National team: Australia
- Born: 17 November 1983 (age 42) Brisbane, Queensland
- Height: 1.76 m (5 ft 9 in)
- Weight: 63 kg (139 lb)

Sport
- Sport: Swimming
- Strokes: Freestyle
- Club: Chandler Swimming Club
Medal record
Women's swimming
Representing Australia
Olympic Games
Gold medal – first place	2004 Athens	100 m freestyle
Gold medal – first place	2004 Athens	4×100 m freestyle
Gold medal – first place	2004 Athens	4×100 m medley
World Championships (LC)
Gold medal – first place	2005 Montreal	100 m freestyle
Gold medal – first place	2005 Montreal	4×100 m freestyle
Gold medal – first place	2005 Montreal	4×100 m medley
Gold medal – first place	2007 Melbourne	4×100 m freestyle
Gold medal – first place	2007 Melbourne	4×100 m medley
Silver medal – second place	2003 Barcelona	100 m freestyle
Bronze medal – third place	2003 Barcelona	4×100 m freestyle
Bronze medal – third place	2003 Barcelona	4×100 m medley
Pan Pacific Championships
Gold medal – first place	2002 Yokohama	4×100 m freestyle
Gold medal – first place	2002 Yokohama	4×100 m medley
Silver medal – second place	2002 Yokohama	50 m freestyle
Silver medal – second place	2002 Yokohama	100 m freestyle
Commonwealth Games
Gold medal – first place	2002 Manchester	100 m freestyle
Gold medal – first place	2002 Manchester	4×100 m freestyle
Gold medal – first place	2002 Manchester	4×100 m medley
Gold medal – first place	2006 Melbourne	4×100 m freestyle
Silver medal – second place	2002 Manchester	50 m freestyle
Silver medal – second place	2006 Melbourne	50 m freestyle
Silver medal – second place	2006 Melbourne	100 m freestyle

Jodie Clare Henry, OAM (born 17 November 1983) is an Australian former competitive swimmer, Olympic gold medallist at the 2004 Summer Olympics and former world-record holder.

== Career ==
=== 2002–2003 ===
Henry trained at Chandler Swimming Club under Shannon Rollason, alongside relay teammate Alice Mills.

Henry competed at the 2002 Commonwealth Games in Birmingham. She won the gold medal in the 100 m freestyle in a time of 55.45. She won silver in the 50 m freestyle in a time of 25.37. She later swam the second leg of the 4 × 100 m freestyle relay, winning the gold medal in a games record time of 3:40.41. She then swam the freestyle leg of the 4 × 100 m medley relay. Australia won the gold medal in a games record time of 4:03.70.

At the 2002 Pan Pacific Championships in Yokohama, Henry competed in the 4 × 100 m freestyle relay. She swam the first leg and recorded a personal best time of 54.94 in the 100 m freestyle; Australia won the gold medal in a championship record time of 3:39.78. Henry then finished second in the 50 m freestyle with a time of 25.31. She won another silver in the 100 m freestyle, recording a time of 54.55 to break Susie O'Neill's Australian record of 54.79 from 2000. She concluded the competition with the 4 × 100 m medley relay, where she split 54.07 on the freestyle leg; Australia won gold in a championship record time of 4:00.50.

At the 2003 World Championships in Barcelona, Henry swam the third leg of the 4 × 100 m freestyle relay and split 54.22; Australia won the bronze medal in a time of 3:38.83. Henry later won the silver medal in the 100 m freestyle with a time of 54.58. She swam the freestyle leg of the 4 × 100 m medley relay and split 54.14. Australia won the bronze medal in a time of 4:01.37.

=== 2004 ===
At the 2004 Australian Championships in Sydney, Henry competed in the 100 m freestyle. In the first semifinal, Libby Lenton swam 53.66 to break the world record of 53.77 set by the Netherlands' Inge de Bruijn in 2000. In the second semifinal, Henry matched de Bruijn's mark, tying the second-fastest time in history. The following day, Henry won the final in a time of 53.82 and qualified for the 2004 Olympics in Athens.

At the 2004 Olympics, Henry swam in the 4 × 100 m freestyle relay. Australia set a new national record of 3:38.26 and qualified fastest for the final. In the final, Henry swam the anchor leg in 52.95, the fastest relay split in history (as of August 2004). Australia won the gold medal in a world record time of 3:35.94, lowering the mark set by Germany in 2002 by 0.06 seconds. In the 100 m freestyle, Henry went 53.52 in the semifinals to break Lenton's world record. Henry went on to win the gold medal in a time of 53.84, becoming Australia's first Olympic champion in the event since Dawn Fraser in 1964. Henry swam the freestyle leg of the 4 × 100 m medley relay, splitting 52.97. Australia won the gold medal in a time of 3:57.32, breaking the world record of 3:58.30 set by the US in 2000.

=== 2005–2009 ===
In 2005, Henry swam the first leg of the 4 × 100 m freestyle relay, splitting 54.45. Australia won the gold medal in a time of 3:37.32, breaking the championship record of 3:37.91 set by China in 1994. Henry later won the gold medal in the 100 m freestyle in a time of 54.18, becoming the first Australian to win the event at the World Championships. She swam the heats of the 4 × 100 m medley relay, splitting 54.03 on the freestyle leg, before being replaced by Lenton in the final. Australia went on to win the gold medal.

In January 2006, Henry left Rollason and moved to train under Jim Fowlie at the Australian Institute of Sport.

Henry competed at the 2006 Commonwealth Games in Melbourne. She won the silver medal in the 100 m freestyle in a time of 53.78. She won another silver medal in the 50 m freestyle with a personal best time of 24.72. Later in the session, she swam the second leg of the 4 × 100 m freestyle relay, splitting 53.30. Australia won gold in a games record time of 3:36.49, then the fourth-fastest time in history.

At the 2007 World Championships in Melbourne, Henry swam the anchor leg of the 4 × 100 m freestyle relay, splitting 53.21. Australia won the gold medal in a championship record time of 3:35.48. This was the second-fastest time in the event's history, 0.26 seconds slower than Germany's world record from 2006. She then came sixth in the 100 m freestyle with a time of 54.21. She swam the heats of the 4 × 100 m medley relay, splitting 53.96 before again being replaced by Lenton in the final. Australia eventually won the gold medal.

In November 2007, Henry returned to Brisbane to train with Rollason's former assistant coach, Drew McGregor.

In February 2008, Henry withdrew from the Australian Championships due to a pelvic muscle imbalance, which ruled her out of the 2008 Olympics.

In September 2009, Henry retired from swimming at the age of 25.

== Personal life ==
Henry married former Australian rules footballer Tim Notting; they have three children.

== Awards and honours ==
- 2004: Swimming Australia Swimmer of the Year
- 2004: Swimming World – Female Pacific Rim Swimmer of the Year
- 2005: Order of Australia Medal
- 2014: Sport Australia Hall of Fame inductee
- 2015: International Swimming Hall of Fame inductee

== See also ==
- List of Olympic medalists in swimming (women)
- List of World Aquatics Championships medalists in swimming (women)
- List of Commonwealth Games medallists in swimming (women)
- World record progression 100 metres freestyle
- World record progression 4 × 100 metres freestyle relay
- World record progression 4 × 100 metres medley relay

Awards
Preceded by Leisel Jones	Swimming World; Pacific Rim Swimmer of the Year; 2004	Succeeded by Leisel Jones
