= Vivienne Rignall =

New Zealand swimmer

Personal information
- Full name: Vivienne Maria Rignall
- National team: New Zealand
- Born: 10 January 1973 (age 53) Ludwigsburg, Baden-Württemberg, Germany
- Height: 1.82 m (6 ft 0 in)
- Weight: 70 kg (154 lb)

Sport
- Sport: Swimming
- Strokes: Freestyle

Vivienne Maria Rignall (born 10 January 1973) is a New Zealand former swimmer, who specialised in sprint freestyle events. Rignall represented New Zealand, as a 27-year-old, at the 2000 Summer Olympics, and eventually, at the 2002 Commonwealth Games, where she became a sixth-place finalist in the 50 m freestyle. She also holds a dual residency status to compete internationally for her parents' homeland.

Rignall competed only in the women's 50 m freestyle at the 2000 Summer Olympics in Sydney. She achieved a FINA A-standard of 25.85, a national record, from the German Championships in Berlin. Rignall shared a ninth seed with Sweden's Anna-Karin Kammerling in the semifinals at 25.61, but missed a spot for the top 8 final by 12-hundredths of a second. Earlier in the prelims, she posted fourth-seeded time and a New Zealand record of 25.52 from the final of ten heats, pulling herself off with a seventh-place finish.

At the 2002 Commonwealth Games in Manchester, England, Rignall finished sixth in the 50 m freestyle, with a time of 26.02.
