= Lee Keo-ra =

South Korean swimmer (born 1989)

Personal information
- Full name: Lee Keo-ra
- National team: South Korea
- Born: 7 May 1989 (age 37) Ulsan, South Korea
- Height: 1.65 m (5 ft 5 in)
- Weight: 51 kg (112 lb)

Sport
- Sport: Swimming
- Strokes: Freestyle
- Club: Ulsan City Hall
Medal record
Women's swimming
Representing South Korea
Asian Games
Bronze medal – third place	2006 Doha	4×200 m freestyle

Lee Keo-ra (also Lee Gyeo-ra, Korean: 이겨라; born May 7, 1989) is a South Korean swimmer, who specialized in middle-distance freestyle events. She represented her nation South Korea at the 2008 Summer Olympics, and has won a bronze medal, as a member of the women's 4 × 200 m freestyle relay team, at the 2006 Asian Games in Doha, Qatar.

Lee competed for the South Korean swimming team in the women's 200 m freestyle at the 2008 Summer Olympics in Beijing. She finished with a thirty-first place time of 2:02.61 to earn her selection to the South Korea's Olympic team at the World Championships one year earlier in Melbourne, Australia, clearing the FINA B-cut (2:03.50) by almost a full second. Coming from seventh at the 150-metre lap in heat two, Lee held off a sprint challenge from Ireland's Melanie Nocher towards the final stretch, but could not catch her near the wall by over a full-body length to finish in dead-last with a disappointing 2:05.71. Lee failed to advance into the semifinals, as she placed forty-sixth overall in the prelims.
