= Alice Tait =

Australian swimmer (born 1986)

Alice Tait OAM
Personal information
- Full name: Alice Mary Tait
- National team: Australia
- Born: 23 May 1986 (age 40) Brisbane, Queensland, Australia
- Height: 1.75 m (5 ft 9 in)
- Weight: 63 kg (139 lb)

Sport
- Sport: Swimming
- Strokes: Freestyle, butterfly, medley
- Club: Chandler Swimming Club; Southport Olympic
Medal record
Women's swimming
Representing Australia
Olympic Games
Gold medal – first place	2004 Athens	4×100 m freestyle
Gold medal – first place	2004 Athens	4×100 m medley
Bronze medal – third place	2008 Beijing	4×100 m freestyle
World Championships (LC)
Gold medal – first place	2005 Montreal	4×100 m freestyle
Silver medal – second place	2003 Barcelona	200 m medley
Silver medal – second place	2003 Barcelona	50 m freestyle
Silver medal – second place	2003 Barcelona	4×200 m freestyle
Bronze medal – third place	2003 Barcelona	4×100 m freestyle
World Championships (SC)
Silver medal – second place	2008 Manchester	4×100 m freestyle
Silver medal – second place	2008 Manchester	4×100 m medley
Pan Pacific Championships
Gold medal – first place	2002 Yokohama	4×100 m freestyle
Silver medal – second place	2002 Yokohama	4×200 m freestyle
Commonwealth Games
Gold medal – first place	2002 Manchester	4×100 m freestyle
Gold medal – first place	2006 Melbourne	4×100 m freestyle
Bronze medal – third place	2006 Melbourne	50 m freestyle
Bronze medal – third place	2006 Melbourne	100 m freestyle
Bronze medal – third place	2006 Melbourne	50 m butterfly
Universiade
Gold medal – first place	2011 Shenzhen	4×100 m freestyle
Bronze medal – third place	2011 Shenzhen	50 m butterfly
Bronze medal – third place	2011 Shenzhen	100 m butterfly

Alice Mary Tait, OAM (née Mills; born 23 May 1986) is an Australian former swimmer who represented Australia at the 2004 Athens Olympics and the 2008 Beijing Olympics winning two relay gold medals and a bronze.

== Career ==
Trained by her coach Shannon Rollason at the Chandler Sports Complex along with her good friend Jodie Henry, Tait was selected to make her international debut at the 2002 Commonwealth Games in Manchester, England, at the age of 16, where she collected a gold in the 4 × 100 m freestyle relay, as well as competing in the finals of the 50 m freestyle and 200 m individual medley. She repeated this at the 2002 Pan Pacific Championships in Yokohama, Japan.

2003 saw a big improvement in Tait's performance on the international swimming stage, when she received two silver medals at the 2003 World Swimming Championships in Barcelona, Spain in the 200 m individual medley and 50 m freestyle, breaking the Commonwealth record in the former and the Australian record in the latter. She also collected a silver and bronze in the 4 × 200 m and 4 × 100 m freestyle relays respectively.

2004 was a somewhat mixed year for Tait. She was beaten into 3rd place at the Australian trials in both the 50 m and 100 m freestyle, meaning that she was forced to watch these events from the stands. However, along with teammates Libby Lenton, Petria Thomas, and Jodie Henry, she won gold with a world record time in the women's 4 × 100 metre relay; 3min 35.94s. Later, she performed much slower than her previous best in the 200 m individual medley, being eliminated in the final. She admitted that she had been distracted by the earlier relay triumph. She also picked up a gold by swimming in the heats for the victorious 4 × 100 m medley relay team.

Tait started 2005 by relocating to the Australian Institute of Sport along with Rollason and Henry. She started the year strongly, winning the 50 m and 100 m freestyle at the Australian championships, both in new personal best times, the former in Commonwealth record time. She also qualified in the 50 m butterfly in second place, and came third in the 100 m butterfly (but was not selected as each country is restricted to two entries, despite being ranked third in the world), all in new personal best times. However, she had a form slump at the 2005 World Swimming Championships in Montreal, Quebec, Canada, swimming much slower than at the selection trials, and missing the medals. She collected a gold medal as part of the 4 × 100 m freestyle relay team.

In 2006, Tait qualified and competed at the 2006 Commonwealth Games. She won bronze in the 50 m and 100 m freestyle behind Libby Lenton and Jodie Henry and in the 50 m butterfly behind Danni Miatke and Jessicah Schipper. She combined with Henry, Lenton and Shayne Reese to claim gold in the 4 × 100 m freestyle relay.

In late 2006, Tait missed selection for the 2007 World Aquatics Championships. She was part of the bronze medal-winning Australian team in the 4 × 100 m freestyle relay at the 2008 Summer Olympics.

In the 2005 Australia Day Honours, Tait was awarded the Medal of the Order of Australia for "service to sport as a Gold Medallist at the Athens 2004 Olympic Games".

Tait announced her retirement from sports in June 2012.

== Personal life ==
Tait is married to the former Scottish Olympic swimmer Gregor Tait. Their son was born in August 2015; in June 2018, they had a second.
