= Jen Button =

Canadian swimmer (born 1977)

Personal information
- Full name: Jennifer Button
- Nickname: "Jen"
- National team: Canada
- Born: October 15, 1977 (age 48) Comox, British Columbia
- Height: 1.63 m (5 ft 4 in)
- Weight: 55 kg (121 lb)

Sport
- Sport: Swimming
- Strokes: Butterfly, freestyle
- Club: Region of Waterloo
Medal record
Women's swimming
Representing Canada
Commonwealth Games
Bronze medal – third place	2002 Manchester	100m butterfly
Pan American Games
Silver medal – second place	1999 Winnipeg	200m butterfly
Pan Pacific Championships
Bronze medal – third place	2002 Yokohama	4×100 m medley

Jennifer Button (born October 15, 1977) is a former female butterfly and freestyle swimmer from Canada, who competed for her native country at the 2000 Summer Olympics in Sydney, Australia. Her best result was finishing in fifth place in the women's 4x200-metre freestyle relay event.
