= Yokohama International Swimming Pool =

Swimming venue in Yokohama, Japan

Coordinates: 35.564118°N 139.594597°E

- 横浜国際プール
- Water Arena

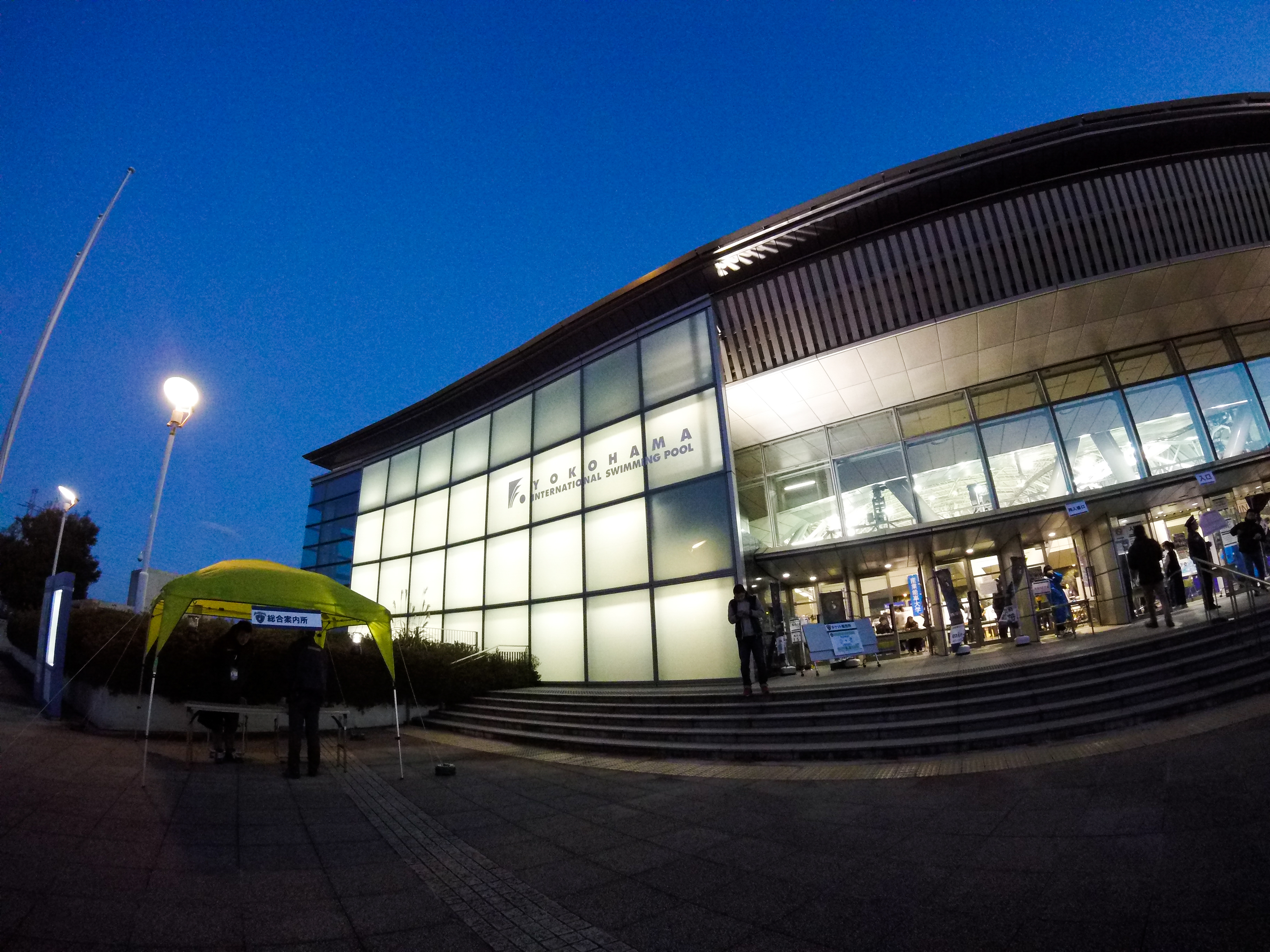
- Interactive map of Yokohama International Swimming Pool
- Address: Tsuzuki-ku, Yokohama, Japan
- Owner: Yokohama City
- Capacity: 4,000 basketball:5,000

Construction
- Opened: 4 July 1998
- Architect: Sozosha

Tenant
- Yokohama B-Corsairs

Website
- http://www.waterarena.jp/english

Yokohama International Swimming Pool (横浜国際プール, Yokohama Kokusai Pūru) is a swimming venue in Yokohama, Japan. The main pool is converted to a basketball arena in fall and winter by setting up panels on the floor. This sports court can be slippery. This arena is home of the B.League basketball club Yokohama B-Corsairs.

== Events ==
- 2002 Pan Pacific Swimming Championships
- 2006 FINA Synchronised Swimming World Cup

== Gallery ==
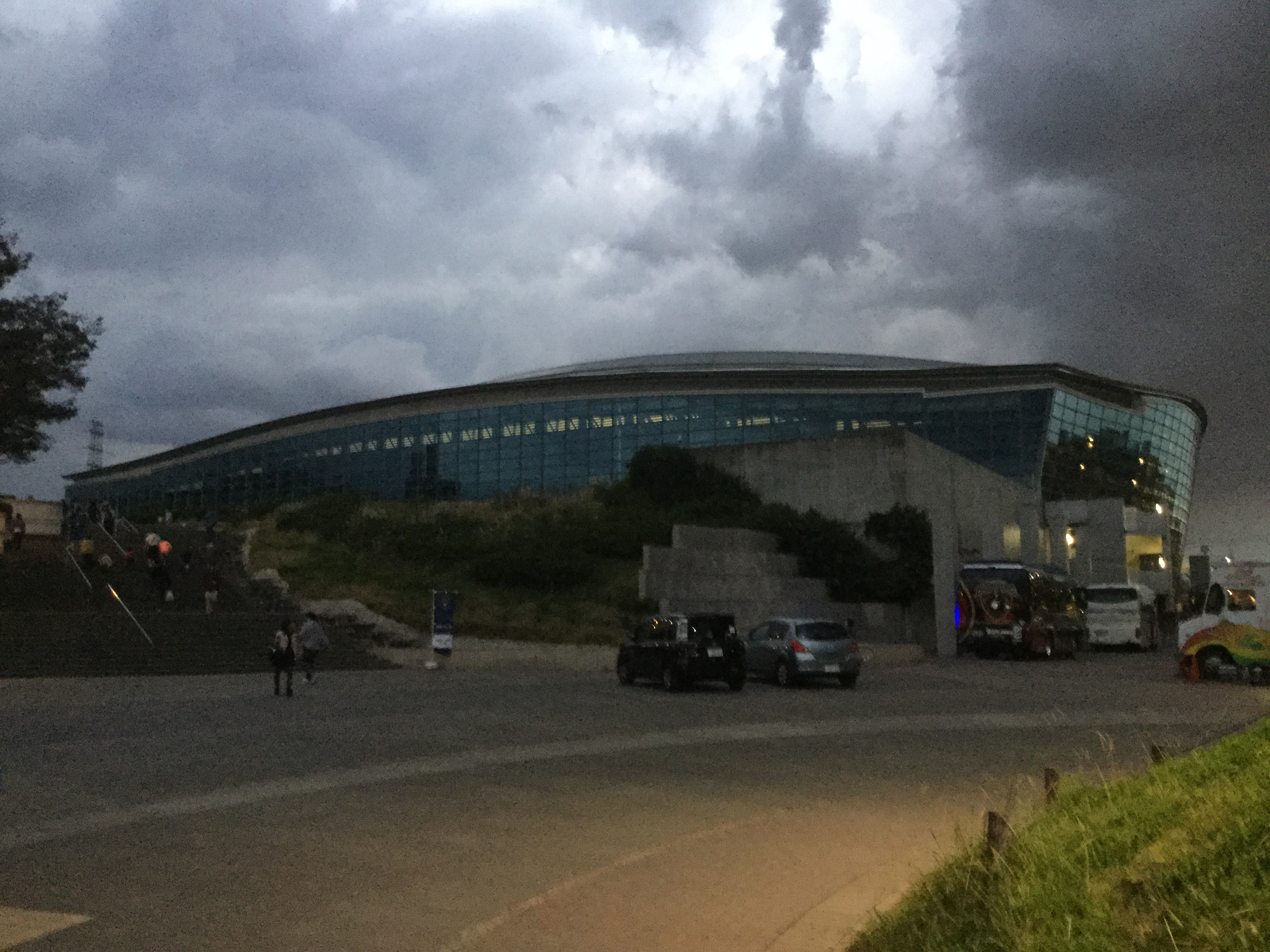

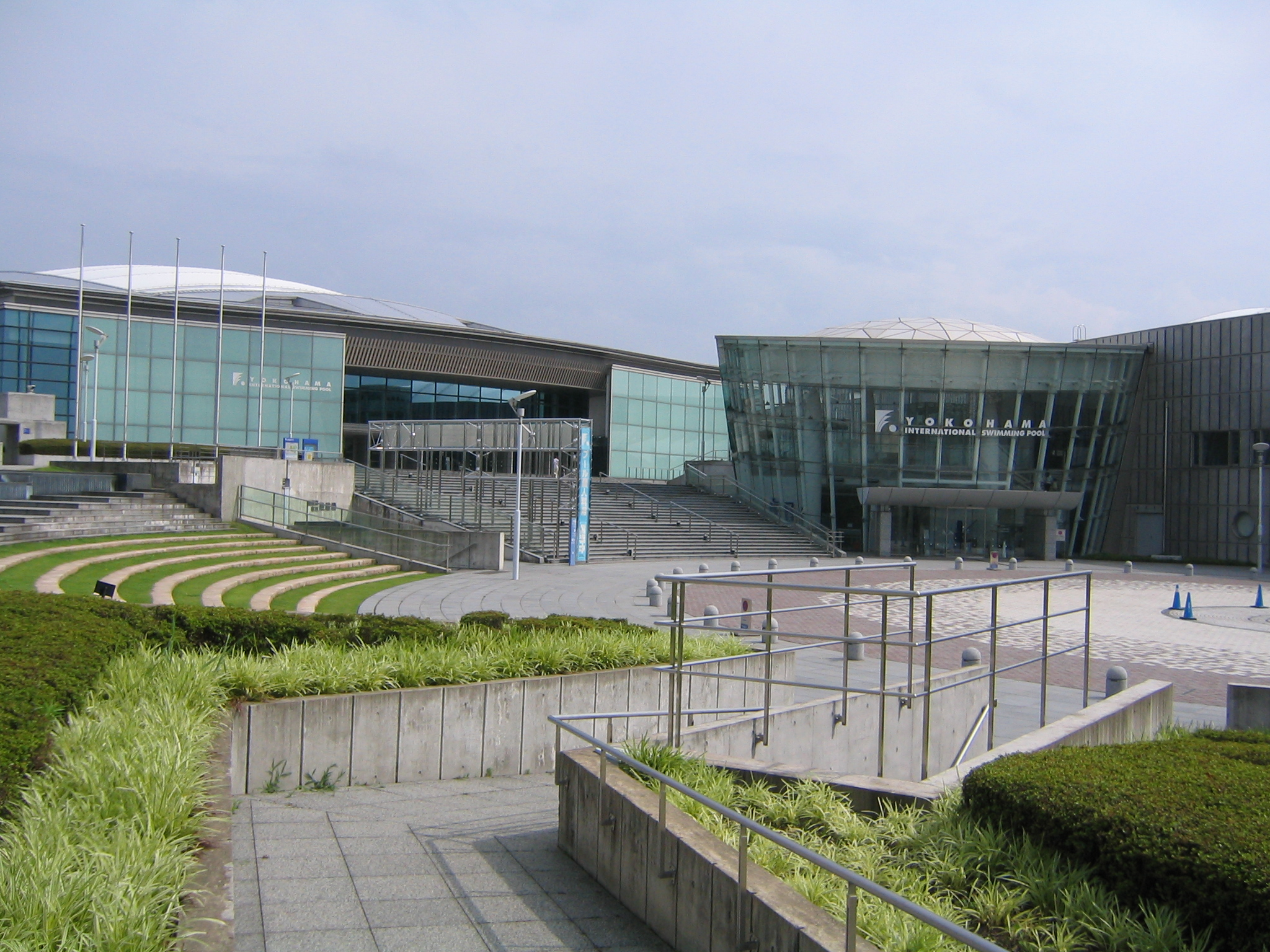

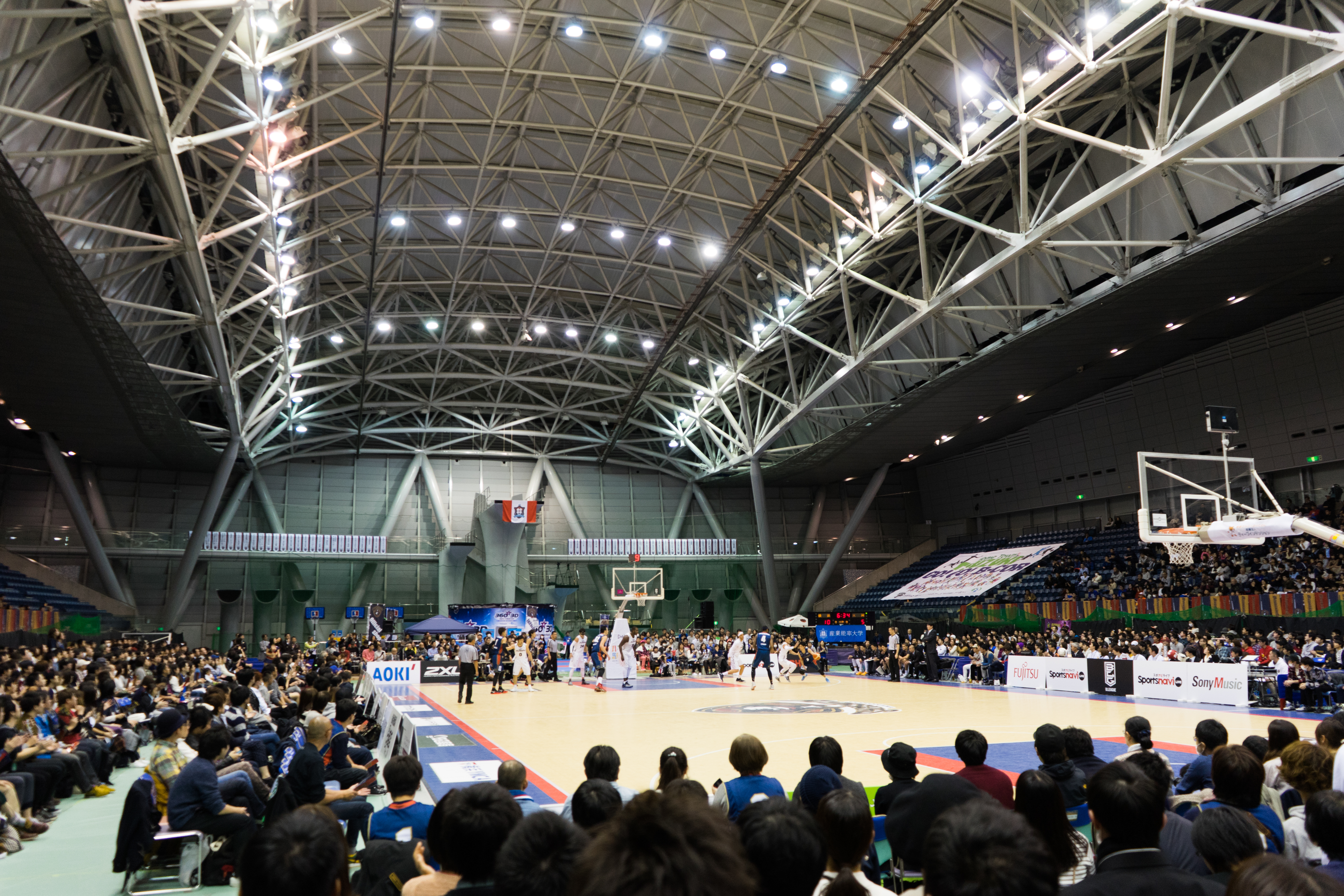

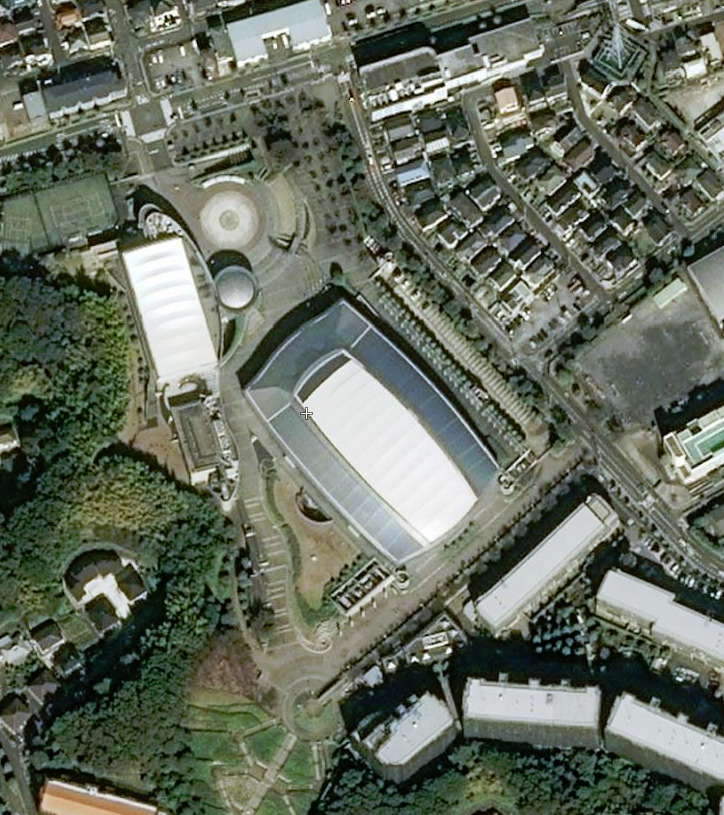
Satellite view

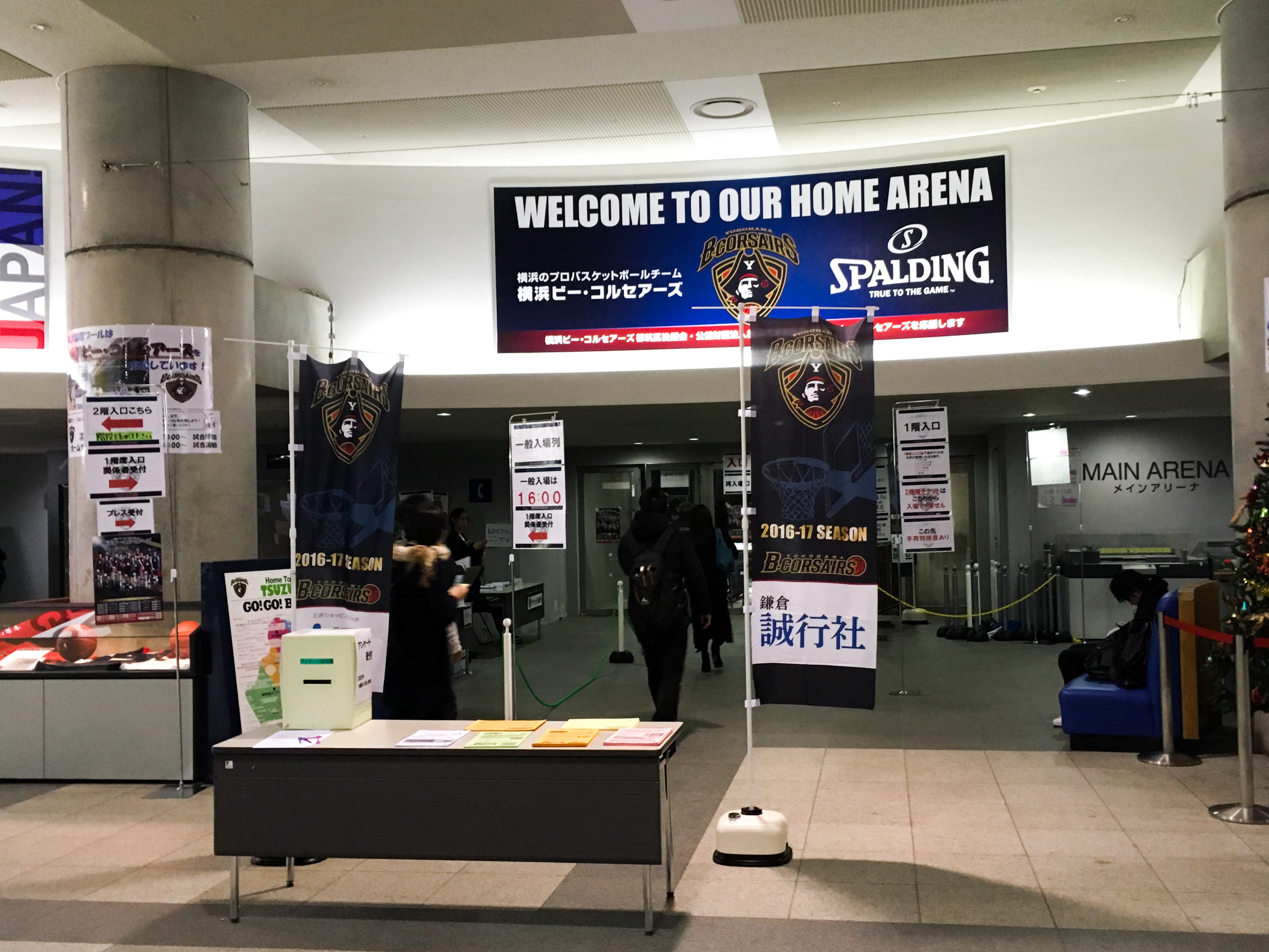

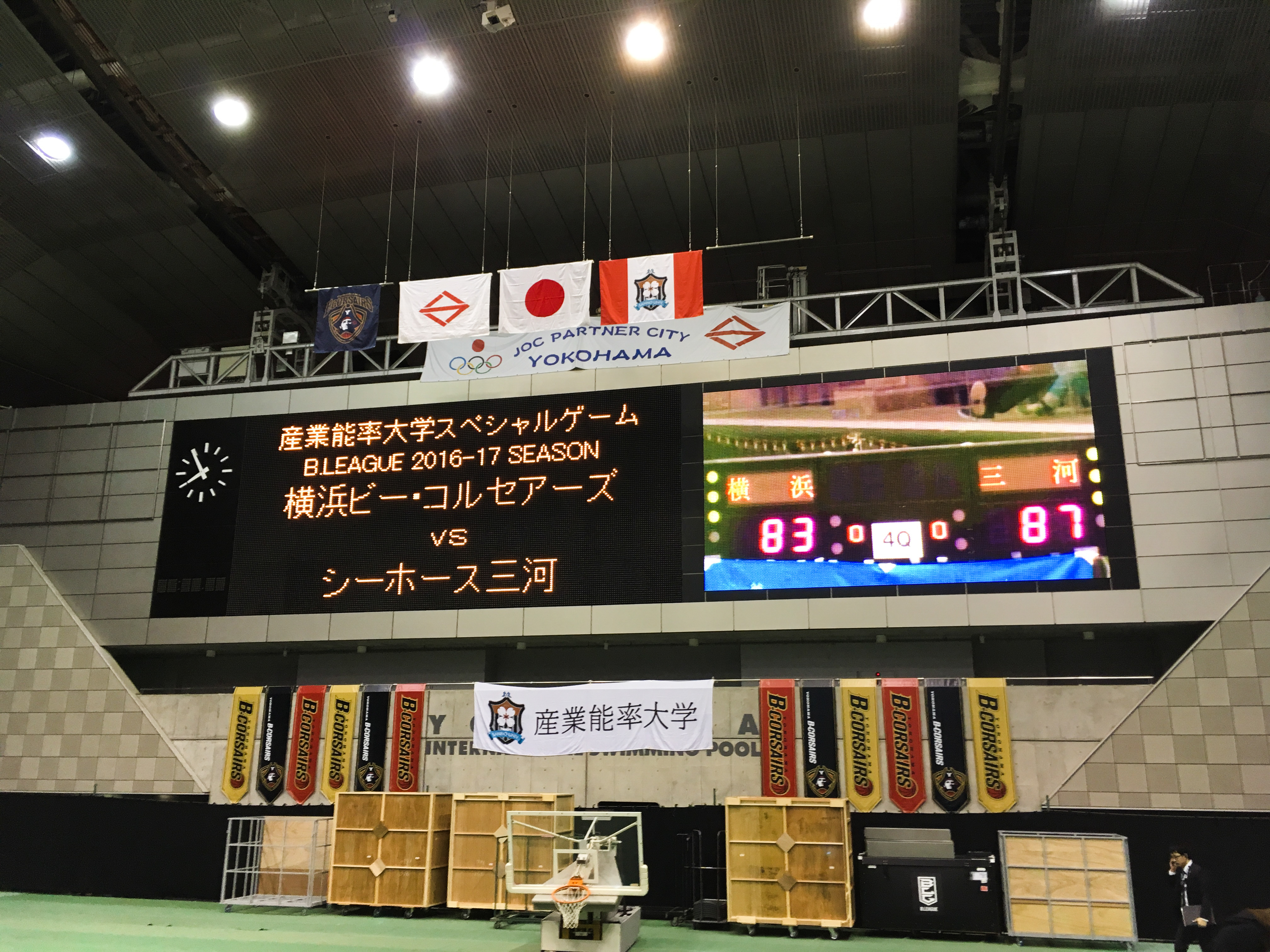
