= Jennifer Ng =

Hong Kong swimmer

Personal information
- Born: 1985 (age 40–41)

Sport
- Sport: Swimming
- Strokes: Freestyle
- College team: University of British Columbia

Jennifer Ng Chi Kwon (born 1985) is a national team freestyle swimmer from Hong Kong. She has swum for Hong Kong at the 2002 Asian Games, 2002 Pan Pacs, and the 2003 World Championships. She trained in college at Canada's University of British Columbia.
