= Sarah Ryan =

Australian swimmer (born 1977)

- Ryan, with Guy Sebastian (2006)

Personal information
- Full name: Sarah Michelle Ryan
- National team: Australia
- Born: 20 February 1977 (age 49) Adelaide, South Australia
- Height: 1.73 m (5 ft 8 in)
- Weight: 65 kg (143 lb)
- Family: Riley Kingsell (son)

Sport
- Sport: Swimming
- Strokes: Freestyle
- Club: Western Sharks
Medal record
Women's swimming
Representing Australia
Olympic Games
Gold medal – first place	2004 Athens	4×100 m freestyle
Silver medal – second place	1996 Atlanta	4×100 m medley
Silver medal – second place	2000 Sydney	4×100 m medley
World Championships (LC)
Gold medal – first place	2001 Fukuoka	4×100 m medley
Silver medal – second place	1998 Perth	4×100 m medley
Bronze medal – third place	1998 Perth	4×100 m freestyle
World Championships (SC)
Silver medal – second place	1995 Rio	4×100 m freestyle
Silver medal – second place	2002 Moscow	4×100 m freestyle
Bronze medal – third place	1997 Gothenburg	4×100 m medley
Bronze medal – third place	1999 Hong Kong	4×100 m freestyle
Pan Pacific Championships
Gold medal – first place	1995 Atlanta	4×100 m medley
Gold medal – first place	2002 Yokohama	4×100 m freestyle
Silver medal – second place	1993 Kobe	4×100 m freestyle
Silver medal – second place	1995 Atlanta	4×100 m freestyle
Silver medal – second place	1997 Fukuoka	4×100 m medley
Silver medal – second place	1999 Sydney	50 m freestyle
Silver medal – second place	1999 Sydney	100 m freestyle
Silver medal – second place	1999 Sydney	4×100 m freestyle
Silver medal – second place	1999 Sydney	4×100 m medley
Bronze medal – third place	1997 Fukuoka	4×100 m freestyle
Bronze medal – third place	1997 Fukuoka	4×200 m freestyle
Commonwealth Games
Gold medal – first place	1998 Kuala Lumpur	4×100 m freestyle
Gold medal – first place	2002 Manchester	4×100 m freestyle
Silver medal – second place	1994 Victoria	4×100 m freestyle

Sarah Michelle Ryan, OAM (born 20 February 1977) is an Australian former sprint freestyle swimmer, who won relay medals at three consecutive Olympics from the 1996 Summer Olympics to the 2004 Summer Olympics.

== Early life ==
Coming from Adelaide, South Australia, Ryan attended the Catholic Mount Carmel College, before moving to the Australian Institute of Sport, Canberra, in 1993 after being awarded a scholarship.

== Swimming career ==
She gained selection for Australia the following year at the 1994 Commonwealth Games in Victoria, British Columbia.

In 1996, at the Atlanta Olympics, she came sixth in the 100-metre freestyle, and was a member of the 4×100-metre medley relay along with Susie O'Neill, Samantha Riley and Nicole Stevenson, which claimed silver behind the United States team. At the 1998 Commonwealth Games in Kuala Lumpur, Malaysia, she was a part of the team which won the 4×100-metre freestyle relay only days after the death of her father.

In 2000, at the Sydney Olympics, Ryan failed to qualify for the finals of either the 50- or 100-metre freestyle. She was a member of the 4×100-metre freestyle relay which placed sixth and collected a silver for swimming in the heats of the 4×100-metre medley relay, being replaced by O'Neill in the final, again second to the Americans.

In 2001, possibly her most savoured moment came at the FINA World Championships in Fukuoka, Japan, when she anchored the 4×100-metre medley relay team with Dyana Calub, Leisel Jones and Petria Thomas to a long-awaited win over the American team. It was the first time that Australia had defeated the Americans at either Olympic or World level in the event. The year 2002 broke another drought, with Ryan being part of a 4×100-metre freestyle team alongside Jodie Henry, Alice Mills and Thomas, which defeated the Americans for the first time since 1956.

In 2003, Ryan took time away from swimming and commenced a job as a breakfast radio presenter, as well as an occasional swimming analyst on SBS' Toyota World Sports and Channel Nine's Wide World of Sports. However, with Australia's young sprinting talent on the rise, she made a comeback to qualify for the 4×100-metre freestyle relay team for the 2004 Summer Olympics in Athens. Ryan swam in the heats, but was replaced in the final by Thomas, who combined with Henry, Mills and Libby Lenton to claim gold in a world record time of 3min 35.94 seconds. Ryan retired after the games.

== Post swimming ==
In 2006, to support multiple sclerosis research, Ryan teamed up with 2003 Australian Idol winner and award-winning recording artist Guy Sebastian in 7 Network's It Takes Two, in which famous accomplished Australians from their different fields, and not known to be singers, performed duets with professional vocalists to support their chosen charity. Ryan and Sebastian were the last team to be eliminated, making them the runners-up in the competition.

== See also ==
- List of Olympic medalists in swimming (women)
