= Toni Jeffs =

New Zealand swimmer (born 1968)

Personal information
- Born: 3 December 1968 (age 57)
Medal record
Women's swimming
Representing New Zealand
Pan Pacific Championships
Bronze medal – third place	1991 Edmonton	50 m freestyle
Commonwealth Games
Bronze medal – third place	1998 Kuala Lumpur	50 m freestyle
Bronze medal – third place	2002 Manchester	50 m freestyle

Toni Maree Jeffs (born 3 December 1968 in Auckland) is a former freestyle swimmer from New Zealand, who competed for her native country at the 1992 Summer Olympics. There she finished 27th equal in the 50m Freestyle. In the same event Jeffs twice won a bronze medal at the Commonwealth Games: in 1998 and in 2002.

In 1990, Jeffs was awarded the New Zealand 1990 Commemoration Medal.
