= Laura Nicholls (swimmer) =

Canadian swimmer

Personal information
- Full name: Laura Nicholls
- National team: Canada
- Born: September 25, 1978 (age 47) Kitchener, Ontario, Canada
- Height: 1.83 m (6 ft 0 in)
- Weight: 72 kg (159 lb)

Sport
- Sport: Swimming
- Strokes: Freestyle
- Club: Region of Waterloo
Medal record
Women's swimming
Representing Canada
Pan Pacific Championships
Silver medal – second place	1997 Fukuoka	4×200 m freestyle
Bronze medal – third place	1999 Sydney	4×100 m freestyle
Bronze medal – third place	1999 Sydney	4×200 m freestyle
Bronze medal – third place	2002 Yokohama	4×100 m medley
Commonwealth Games
Bronze medal – third place	1998 Kuala Lumpur	4×100 m freestyle
Bronze medal – third place	1998 Kuala Lumpur	4×200 m freestyle
Bronze medal – third place	2002 Manchester	4×100 m freestyle
Pan American Games
Gold medal – first place	1999 Winnipeg	100 m freestyle
Gold medal – first place	1999 Winnipeg	4×100 m freestyle
Gold medal – first place	1999 Winnipeg	4×200 m freestyle
Silver medal – second place	1999 Winnipeg	4×100 m medley
Bronze medal – third place	1999 Winnipeg	50 m freestyle

Laura Nicholls (born September 25, 1978) is a Canadian former competition swimmer who won ten international medals in freestyle events, including the Pan Pacific Swimming Championships, Commonwealth Games and Pan American Games. Nicholls represented Canada at two consecutive Summer Olympics, starting in 1996 in Atlanta, Georgia. There she finished in 29th position in the 50-metre freestyle. Four years later in Sydney, Australia, she reached the final with the Canadian relay teams, finishing seventh in the 4x100-metre freestyle, and sixth in the 4x100-metre medley. Laura Nicholls is currently a coach with the Guelph Marlins Aquatic Club in Guelph.
