= Alison Fitch =

New Zealand swimmer (born 1980)

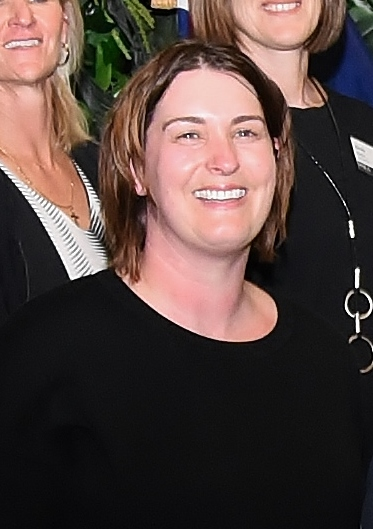
- Fitch in 2018

Personal information
- Nickname: Aly Fitch
- Born: Alison Rachel Fitch; 18 February 1980 (age 46) Hamilton, New Zealand
- Height: 5 ft 9 in (1.75 m)
- Weight: 69 kg (152 lb)

Sport
- Sport: Swimming
- Strokes: Freestyle
- College team: North Shore Swimming Club
Medal record
Commonwealth Games
Bronze medal – third place	2006 Melbourne	4x200m freestyle

Alison Rachel Fitch MNZM (also known as Aly Fitch; born 18 February 1980 in Hamilton, New Zealand) is a New Zealand swimming competitor. She won a bronze medal in the 4 × 200 m freestyle relay at the 2006 Commonwealth Games.

== Career ==
Fitch was one of the 14 swimmers who represented New Zealand at the 1996 Summer Olympics in Atlanta, United States. Fitch was in a team with Anna Wilson, Dionne Bainbridge, and Sarah Catherwood to compete in the 4 × 200 metre freestyle relay. They came fifth in their heat and did not qualify for the final; their overall placement was 11th out of 21 teams.

She also competed at 2004 Olympic Games.

Fitch won a bronze medal with Lauren Boyle, Helen Norfolk and Melissa Ingram in the 4 × 200 m freestyle relay at the 2006 Commonwealth Games.

In the 2008 New Year Honours, Fitch was appointed a Member of the New Zealand Order of Merit for services to swimming.
