= 2002 Pan Pacific Swimming Championships – Women's 100 metre backstroke =

Women's 100 metre backstroke at the 2002 Pan Pacific Swimming Championships
- Venue: Yokohama International Swimming Pool; Yokohama, Japan
- Dates: August 25, 2002 (heats & semifinals); August 26, 2002 (final)
- Competitors: 24 from 6 nations
- Winning time: 59.72

Medalists
gold medal	Natalie Coughlin	United States
silver medal	Dyana Calub	Australia
bronze medal	Haley Cope	United States

The women's 100 metre backstroke competition at the 2002 Pan Pacific Swimming Championships took place on August 25–26 at the Yokohama International Swimming Pool. The last champions were Dyana Calub of Australia and Mai Nakamura of Japan.

This race consisted of two lengths of the pool, all in backstroke.

== Records ==
Prior to this competition, the existing world and Pan Pacific records were as follows:

World record	Natalie Coughlin (USA)	59.58	Fort Lauderdale, United States	August 13, 2002
Pan Pacific Championships record	Janie Wagstaff (USA)	1:01.00	Edmonton, Alberta, Canada	August 22, 1991

== Results ==
All times are in minutes and seconds.

KEY:	q	Fastest non-qualifiers	Q	Qualified	CR	Championships record	NR	National record	PB	Personal best	SB	Seasonal best

=== Heats ===
The first round was held on August 25.

Rank	Heat	Lane	Name	Nationality	Time	Notes
1	1	4	Dyana Calub	Australia	1:02.07	Q
2	1	5	Noriko Inada	Japan	1:02.12	Q
3	3	4	Natalie Coughlin	United States	1:02.29	Q
4	1	6	Erin Gammel	Canada	1:02.38	Q
5	1	3	Courtney Shealy	United States	1:02.50	Q
6	2	4	Diana MacManus	United States	1:02.51	Q
7	2	5	Aya Terakawa	Japan	1:02.71	Q
8	3	5	Haley Cope	United States	1:02.82	Q
9	2	1	Melissa Morgan	Australia	1:02.93	Q
10	2	6	Hannah McLean	New Zealand	1:02.97	Q
11	3	7	Michelle Lischinsky	Canada	1:03.04	Q
12	2	3	Clementine Stoney	Australia	1:03.19	Q
13	1	2	Maureen Farrell	United States	1:03.23	Q
14	1	1	Jennifer Fratesi	Canada	1:03.29	Q
15	3	3	Reiko Nakamura	Japan	1:03.30	Q
16	3	6	Giaan Rooney	Australia	1:03.53	Q
17	2	2	Kelly Stefanyshyn	Canada	1:03.57	
17	3	8	Kelly Tucker	Australia	1:03.57	
19	2	7	Toshie Abe	Japan	1:03.98	
20	3	1	Hiu Wai Sherry Tsai	Hong Kong	1:04.15	
21	1	7	Melissa Ingram	New Zealand	1:04.19	
22	3	2	Frances Adcock	Australia	1:04.27	
23	2	8	Amanda Gillespie	Canada	1:04.29	
24	1	8	Melanie Bouchard	Canada	1:05.67	

=== Semifinals ===
The semifinals were held on August 25.

Rank	Name	Nationality	Time	Notes
1	Dyana Calub	Australia	1:01.77	Q
2	Natalie Coughlin	United States	1:01.99	Q
3	Noriko Inada	Japan	1:02.00	Q
4	Haley Cope	United States	1:02.09	Q
5	Diana MacManus	United States	1:02.10	Q
6	Courtney Shealy	United States	1:02.28	Q
7	Aya Terakawa	Japan	1:02.39	Q
8	Giaan Rooney	Australia	1:02.53	Q
9	Erin Gammel	Canada	1:02.63	
10	Hannah McLean	New Zealand	1:02.82	
11	Melissa Morgan	Australia	1:02.86	
12	Reiko Nakamura	Japan	1:02.91	
13	Michelle Lischinsky	Canada	1:03.22	
14	Jennifer Fratesi	Canada	1:03.42	
15	Kelly Stefanyshyn	Canada	1:03.44	
16	Clementine Stoney	Australia	1:03.52	

=== Final ===
The final was held on August 26.

Rank	Lane	Name	Nationality	Time	Notes
1st place, gold medalist(s)	5	Natalie Coughlin	United States	59.72	CR
2nd place, silver medalist(s)	4	Dyana Calub	Australia	1:01.49	
3rd place, bronze medalist(s)	6	Haley Cope	United States	1:01.74	
4	3	Noriko Inada	Japan	1:01.98	
5	2	Aya Terakawa	Japan	1:02.16	
6	1	Erin Gammel	Canada	1:02.43	
7	7	Giaan Rooney	Australia	1:02.75	
8	8	Hannah McLean	New Zealand	1:03.28	
