= 2002 Pan Pacific Swimming Championships – Women's 200 metre backstroke =

Women's 200 metre backstroke at the 2002 Pan Pacific Swimming Championships
- Venue: Yokohama International Swimming Pool
- Dates: August 28, 2002 (heats & semifinals); August 29, 2002 (final)
- Competitors: 24 from 6 nations
- Winning time: 2:11.00

Medalists
gold medal	Margaret Hoelzer	United States
silver medal	Aya Terakawa	Japan
bronze medal	Jennifer Fratesi	Canada

The women's 200 metre backstroke competition at the 2002 Pan Pacific Swimming Championships took place on August 28–29 at the Yokohama International Swimming Pool. The last champion was Tomoko Hagiwara of Japan.

This race consisted of four lengths of the pool, all in backstroke.

== Records ==
Prior to this competition, the existing world and Pan Pacific records were as follows:

World record	Krisztina Egerszegi (HUN)	2:06.62	Athens, Greece	August 25, 1991
Pan Pacific Championships record	Anna Simcic (NZL)	2:10.79	Edmonton, Canada	August 25, 1991

== Results ==
All times are in minutes and seconds.

KEY:	q	Fastest non-qualifiers	Q	Qualified	CR	Championships record	NR	National record	PB	Personal best	SB	Seasonal best

=== Heats ===
The first round was held on August 28.

Rank	Heat	Lane	Name	Nationality	Time	Notes
1	3	4	Margaret Hoelzer	United States	2:12.55	Q
2	3	3	Tomoko Hagiwara	Japan	2:12.73	Q
3	1	5	Jennifer Fratesi	Canada	2:13.08	Q
4	2	4	Aya Terakawa	Japan	2:13.29	Q
5	1	5	Clementine Stoney	Australia	2:13.60	Q
6	2	4	Reiko Nakamura	Japan	2:13.67	Q
7	1	3	Elizabeth Warden	Canada	2:14.08	Q
8	3	5	Diana MacManus	United States	2:14.25	Q
9	2	5	Toshie Abe	Japan	2:14.46	Q
10	2	6	Noriko Inada	Japan	2:14.85	Q
11	2	2	Hannah McLean	New Zealand	2:14.89	Q
12	3	2	Maureen Farrell	United States	2:15.01	Q
13	3	6	Kelly Tucker	Australia	2:15.23	Q
14	1	2	Melissa Ingram	New Zealand	2:15.42	Q
15	1	6	Melissa Morgan	Australia	2:15.87	Q
16	2	1	Erin Gammel	Canada	2:16.42	Q
17	3	1	Amanda Gillespie	Canada	2:17.16	
18	1	7	Melanie Bouchard	Canada	2:17.80	
19	2	7	Kelly Stefanyshyn	Canada	2:17.82	
20	3	7	Helen Norfolk	New Zealand	2:19.77	
21	3	8	Hiu Wai Sherry Tsai	Hong Kong	2:20.21	
22	1	1	Yvette Rodier	Australia	2:21.05	
23	1	8	Frances Adcock	Australia	2:22.03	
24	2	8	Carissa Thompson	New Zealand	2:30.44	

=== Semifinals ===
The semifinals were held on August 28.

Rank	Heat	Lane	Name	Nationality	Time	Notes
1	1	4	Tomoko Hagiwara	Japan	2:11.27	Q
2	2	5	Jennifer Fratesi	Canada	2:11.96	Q
3	2	4	Margaret Hoelzer	United States	2:12.20	Q
4	1	5	Aya Terakawa	Japan	2:12.68	Q
5	1	3	Reiko Nakamura	Japan	2:12.93	Q
6	1	6	Diana MacManus	United States	2:13.19	Q
7	2	2	Toshie Abe	Japan	2:13.55	Q
8	2	3	Clementine Stoney	Australia	2:14.03	Q
9	2	6	Elizabeth Warden	Canada	2:14.19	
10	1	2	Hannah McLean	New Zealand	2:14.39	
11	1	1	Melissa Morgan	Australia	2:14.45	
12	2	7	Maureen Farrell	United States	2:14.58	
13	1	7	Kelly Tucker	Australia	2:15.50	
14	2	1	Melissa Ingram	New Zealand	2:16.00	
15	2	8	Amanda Gillespie	Canada	2:16.88	
16	1	8	Melanie Bouchard	Canada	2:18.45	

=== Final ===
The final was held on August 29.

Rank	Lane	Name	Nationality	Time	Notes
1st place, gold medalist(s)	5	Margaret Hoelzer	United States	2:11.00	
2nd place, silver medalist(s)	3	Aya Terakawa	Japan	2:12.28	
3rd place, bronze medalist(s)	4	Jennifer Fratesi	Canada	2:12.71	
4	6	Diana MacManus	United States	2:14.01	
5	7	Elizabeth Warden	Canada	2:14.15	
6	2	Clementine Stoney	Australia	2:14.37	
7	1	Hannah McLean	New Zealand	2:14.74	
8	8	Melissa Morgan	Australia	2:16.36	
