= Swimming at the 2001 World Aquatics Championships – Women's 100 metre backstroke =

Women's 100 metre backstroke at the 2001 FINA World Championships
- Dates: 27 July 2001 (heats, semifinals); 28 July 2001 (final)
- Competitors: 42
- Winning time: 1:00.37

Medalists
gold medal	Natalie Coughlin	United States
silver medal	Diana Mocanu	Romania
bronze medal	Antje Buschschulte	Germany

The women's 100 metre backstroke event at the 2001 World Aquatics Championships took place 28 July. The heats and semifinals took place 27 July, with the final being held on 28 July.

== Records ==
Prior to this competition, the existing world and competition records were as follows:

World record	He Cihong (CHN)	1:00.16	Rome, Italy	10 September 1994
Championship record	He Cihong (CHN)	1:00.16	Rome, Italy	10 September 1994

== Results ==
=== Heats ===
Rank	Name	Nationality	Time	Notes
1	Natalie Coughlin	United States	1:00.94	Q
2	Antje Buschschulte	Germany	1:01.60	Q
3	Diana Mocanu	Romania	1:01.81	Q
4	Nina Zhivanevskaya	Spain	1:01.91	Q
5	Sarah Price	United Kingdom	1:01.99	Q
6	Mai Nakamura	Japan	1:02.36	Q
7	Ilona Hlaváčková	Czech Republic	1:02.48	Q
7	Katy Sexton	United Kingdom	1:02.48	Q
9	Hanae Ito	Japan	1:02.64	Q
10	Stanislava Komarova	Russia	1:02.70	Q
11	Louise Ørnstedt	Denmark	1:03.05	Q
12	Dyana Calub	Australia	1:03.17	Q
13	Zhan Shu	China	1:03.22	Q
14	Haley Cope	United States	1:03.23	Q
15	Anu Koivisto	Finland	1:03.25	Q
16	Giaan Rooney	Australia	1:03.58	Q
17	Michelle Lischinsky	Canada	1:03.63	
18	Jennifer Carroll	Canada	1:04.49	
19	Dominique Diezi	Switzerland	1:04.52	
20	Ania Gustomelski	Israel	1:04.59	
21	Maria Santos	Portugal	1:04.65	
22	Shim Min-Ji	South Korea	1:04.67	
23	Alenka Kejžar	Slovenia	1:04.75	
23	Alessandra Cappa	Italy	1:04.75	
25	Helen Nolfolk	New Zealand	1:05.89	
26	Deirdre Hughes	Ireland	1:06.82	
27	Kuan Chia-Hsien	Chinese Taipei	1:07.63	
28	Saida Iskandarova	Uzbekistan	1:07.96	
29	Valeria Silva	Peru	1:08.22	
30	Ayeisha Collymore	Trinidad and Tobago	1:08.31	
31	Elena Efimenko	Uzbekistan	1:08.73	
32	Yang Chin-Kuei	Chinese Taipei	1:08.86	
33	María Costanzo	Paraguay	1:09.22	
34	Jacqueline Lim	Singapore	1:09.25	
35	Khadisa Ciss	Senegal	1:09.47	
36	Perla Martinez	Honduras	1:10.09	
37	Denyse Tan	Singapore	1:10.52	
38	Reshma Millet	India	1:11.29	
39	Shun Kwan Andrea Chum	Macau	1:13.96	
40	Yelena Rojkova	Turkmenistan	1:19.72	
41	Lasm Meledje	Ivory Coast	1:19.81	
42	Miriam Nakolo	Kenya	1:21.93	
–	Ivana Gabrilo	Switzerland	DNS	

=== Semifinals ===
Rank	Name	Nationality	Time	Notes
1	Natalie Coughlin	United States	1:00.91	Q
2	Diana Mocanu	Romania	1:01.26	Q
3	Nina Zhivanevskaya	Spain	1:01.44	Q
4	Antje Buschschulte	Germany	1:01.55	Q
5	Sarah Price	United Kingdom	1:01.60	Q
6	Mai Nakamura	Japan	1:01.94	Q
7	Ilona Hlaváčková	Czech Republic	1:02.19	Q
8	Hanae Ito	Japan	1:02.23	Q
9	Dyana Calub	Australia	1:02.25	
10	Stanislava Komarova	Russia	1:02.53	
11	Haley Cope	United States	1:02.61	
12	Louise Ørnstedt	Denmark	1:02.67	
13	Zhan Shu	China	1:02.70	
14	Anu Koivisto	Finland	1:03.04	
15	Katy Sexton	United Kingdom	1:03.16	
16	Giaan Rooney	Australia	1:03.85	

=== Final ===
Rank	Name	Nationality	Time	Notes
1st place, gold medalist(s)	Natalie Coughlin	United States	1:00.37	
2nd place, silver medalist(s)	Diana Mocanu	Romania	1:00.68	
3rd place, bronze medalist(s)	Antje Buschschulte	Germany	1:01.42	
4	Nina Zhivanevskaya	Spain	1:01.75	
5	Mai Nakamura	Japan	1:01.80	
6	Sarah Price	United Kingdom	1:01.82	
7	Hanae Ito	Japan	1:02.40	
8	Ilona Hlaváčková	Czech Republic	1:02.60	
