= 1999 Pan Pacific Swimming Championships – Women's 200 metre backstroke =

Women's 200 metre backstroke at the 1999 Pan Pacific Swimming Championships
- Venue: Sydney International Aquatic Centre
- Dates: August 27, 1999 (heats & semifinals); August 28, 1999 (final)
- Competitors: 24 from 8 nations
- Winning time: 2:11.36

Medalists
gold medal	Tomoko Hagiwara	Japan
silver medal	Miki Nakao	Japan
bronze medal	Lindsay Benko	United States

The women's 200 metre backstroke competition at the 1999 Pan Pacific Swimming Championships took place on August 27–28 at the Sydney International Aquatic Centre. The last champion was Mai Nakamura of Japan.

This race consisted of four lengths of the pool, all in backstroke.

== Records ==
Prior to this competition, the existing world and Pan Pacific records were as follows:

World record	Krisztina Egerszegi (HUN)	2:06.62	Athens, Greece	August 25, 1991
Pan Pacific Championships record	Anna Simcic (NZL)	2:10.79	Edmonton, Canada	August 24, 1991

== Results ==
All times are in minutes and seconds.

KEY:	q	Fastest non-qualifiers	Q	Qualified	CR	Championships record	NR	National record	PB	Personal best	SB	Seasonal best

=== Heats ===
The first round was held on August 27.

Rank	Name	Nationality	Time	Notes
1	Tomoko Hagiwara	Japan	2:12.21	Q
2	Miki Nakao	Japan	2:13.39	Q
3	Noriko Inada	Japan	2:14.29	Q
4	Lindsay Benko	United States	2:14.70	Q
5	Nikki Tanner	New Zealand	2:15.04	Q
6	Barbara Bedford	United States	2:15.92	Q
7	Emma Johnson	Australia	2:16.04	Q
8	Choi Soo-min	South Korea	2:16.51	Q
8	Kelly Stefanyshyn	Canada	2:16.51	Q
10	Roh Joo-hee	South Korea	2:16.69	Q
11	Lia Oberstar	United States	2:16.79	Q
12	Helen Norfolk	New Zealand	2:16.97	Q
13	Mai Nakamura	Japan	2:17.00	Q
14	Danielle Lewis	Australia	2:17.31	Q
15	Dyana Calub	Australia	2:17.48	Q
16	Elizabeth Warden	Canada	2:17.59	Q
17	Charlene Wittstock	South Africa	2:17.64	
18	Erin Gammel	Canada	2:18.28	
19	Giaan Rooney	Australia	2:18.57	
20	Jennifer Reilly	Australia	2:18.89	
21	Monique Robins	New Zealand	2:19.56	
22	Carissa Thompson	New Zealand	2:19.56	
23	Andrea Schwartz	Canada	2:19.56	
24	Kuan Chia-hsien	Chinese Taipei	2:19.56	

=== Semifinals ===
The semifinals were held on August 27.

Rank	Name	Nationality	Time	Notes
1	Tomoko Hagiwara	Japan	2:11.21	Q
2	Miki Nakao	Japan	2:12.33	Q
3	Lindsay Benko	United States	2:13.32	Q
4	Mai Nakamura	Japan	2:13.66	
5	Noriko Inada	Japan	2:13.72	
6	Barbara Bedford	United States	2:13.77	Q
7	Kelly Stefanyshyn	Canada	2:14.58	Q
8	Danielle Lewis	Australia	2:14.73	Q
9	Roh Joo-hee	South Korea	2:15.04	Q
10	Emma Johnson	Australia	2:15.22	Q
11	Lia Oberstar	United States	2:16.65	
12	Choi Soo-min	South Korea	2:17.14	
13	Helen Norfolk	New Zealand	2:17.47	
14	Dyana Calub	Australia	2:17.48	
15	Elizabeth Warden	Canada	2:17.51	
16	Nikki Tanner	New Zealand	2:17.55	

=== Final ===
The final was held on August 28.

Rank	Lane	Nationality	Time	Notes
1st place, gold medalist(s)	Tomoko Hagiwara	Japan	2:11.36	
2nd place, silver medalist(s)	Miki Nakao	Japan	2:11.41	
3rd place, bronze medalist(s)	Lindsay Benko	United States	2:13.51	
4	Kelly Stefanyshyn	Canada	2:13.81	
5	Barbara Bedford	United States	2:14.29	
6	Danielle Lewis	Australia	2:14.35	
7	Roh Joo-hee	South Korea	2:15.26	
8	Emma Johnson	Australia	2:15.91	
