= Swimming at the 2001 World Aquatics Championships – Women's 50 metre backstroke =

Women's 50 metre backstroke at the 2001 FINA World Championships
- Dates: 23 July 2001 (heats, semifinals); 24 July 2001 (final)
- Competitors: 44
- Winning time: 28.51 seconds

Medalists
gold medal	Haley Cope	United States
silver medal	Antje Buschschulte	Germany
bronze medal	Natalie Coughlin	United States

The women's 50 metre backstroke event at the 2001 World Aquatics Championships took place 24 July. The heats and semifinals took place 23 July, with the final being held on 24 July.

== Records ==
Prior to the competition, the existing world and championship records were as follows:

World record	Sandra Völker (GER)	28.25	Berlin, Germany	17 June 2000
Championship record	New event			

The following record was established during the competition:

Date	Round	Name	Nation	Time	Record
23 July	Heat 4	Haley Cope	United States	28.60	CR
23 July	Semifinal 1	Natalie Coughlin	United States	28.49	CR

== Results ==
=== Heats ===
Rank	Name	Nationality	Time	Notes
1	Haley Cope	United States	28.60	Q, CR
2	Antje Buschschulte	Germany	28.62	Q
3	Sandra Völker	Germany	28.72	Q
4	Natalie Coughlin	United States	28.77	Q
5	Nina Zhivanevskaya	Spain	28.93	Q
6	Mai Nakamura	Japan	29.00	Q
7	Diana Mocanu	Romania	29.21	Q
8	Dyana Calub	Australia	29.24	Q
9	Hinkelien Schreuder	Netherlands	29.29	Q
10	Hanae Ito	Japan	29.31	Q
11	Anu Koivisto	Finland	29.38	Q
12	Aliaksandra Herasimenia	Belarus	29.44	Q
13	Giaan Rooney	Australia	29.46	Q
14	Michelle Lischinsky	Canada	29.47	Q
15	Dominique Diezi	Switzerland	29.48	Q
16	Sarah Price	United Kingdom	29.49	Q
17	Ilona Hlaváčková	Czech Republic	29.67	
17	Shim Min-Ji	South Korea	29.67	
19	Zhan Shu	China	29.89	
20	Louise Ørnstedt	Denmark	29.92	
21	Jennifer Carroll	Canada	30.02	
22	Ekaterina Kibalo	Russia	30.04	
23	Maria Santos	Portugal	30.29	
24	Alenka Kejžar	Slovenia	30.40	
25	Anna Gostomelsky	Israel	30.56	
26	Urska Slapsak	Slovenia	30.89	
27	Alessandra Cappa	Italy	30.95	
28	Yang Chin-Kuei	Chinese Taipei	31.40	
29	Deirdre Hughes	Ireland	31.41	
30	Saida Iskandarova	Uzbekistan	31.60	
31	Kuan Chia-Hsien	Chinese Taipei	31.89	
32	Ayeisha Collymore	Trinidad and Tobago	31.90	
33	Jacqueline Lim	Singapore	32.39	
34	Valeria Silva	Peru	32.42	
35	Khadija Ciss	Senegal	32.60	
36	Denyse Tan	Singapore	32.70	
37	Nicole Hayes	Palau	32.93	
38	Reshma Millet	India	32.97	
39	Perla Martinez	Honduras	33.02	
40	Xenavee Pangelinan	Northern Mariana Islands	33.20	
41	Weng Tong Cheong	Macau	34.13	
42	Monika Bakale	Republic of the Congo	34.82	
43	Miriam Nakolo	Kenya	38.01	
44	Lasm Quissoh Genevieve Meledje	Ivory Coast	38.23	

=== Semifinals ===
Rank	Name	Nationality	Time	Notes
1	Natalie Coughlin	United States	28.49	Q, CR
2	Sandra Völker	Germany	28.51	Q
3	Antje Buschschulte	Germany	28.66	Q
4	Dyana Calub	Australia	28.74	Q
5	Haley Cope	United States	28.78	Q
6	Nina Zhivanevskaya	Spain	28.83	Q
7	Diana Mocanu	Romania	29.19	Q
8	Hinkelien Schreuder	Netherlands	29.22	Q
9	Hanae Ito	Japan	29.23	
10	Giaan Rooney	Australia	29.28s	
11	Mai Nakamura	Japan	29.30	
12	Anu Koivisto	Finland	29.41	
13	Dominique Diezi	Switzerland	29.48	
14	Aliaksandra Herasimenia	Belarus	29.50	
15	Michelle Lischinsky	Canada	29.52	
16	Sarah Price	United Kingdom	29.57	

=== Final ===
Rank	Name	Nationality	Time	Notes
1st place, gold medalist(s)	Haley Cope	United States	28.51	
2nd place, silver medalist(s)	Antje Buschschulte	Germany	28.53	
3rd place, bronze medalist(s)	Natalie Coughlin	United States	28.54	
4	Sandra Völker	Germany	28.62	
5	Diana Mocanu	Romania	28.86	
6	Dyana Calub	Australia	28.89	
7	Nina Zhivanevskaya	Spain	28.90	
8	Hinkelien Schreuder	Netherlands	28.99	
