= 1999 Pan Pacific Swimming Championships – Women's 100 metre backstroke =

Women's 100 metre backstroke at the 1999 Pan Pacific Swimming Championships
- Venue: Sydney International Aquatic Centre
- Dates: August 23, 1999 (heats & semifinals); August 24, 1999 (final)
- Competitors: 20 from 8 nations
- Winning time: 1:01.51

Medalists
gold medal	Dyana Calub	Australia
gold medal	Mai Nakamura	Japan
bronze medal	Barbara Bedford	United States

The women's 100 metre backstroke competition at the 1999 Pan Pacific Swimming Championships took place on August 23–24 at the Sydney International Aquatic Centre. The last champion was Mai Nakamura of Japan.

This race consisted of two lengths of the pool, all in backstroke.

== Records ==
Prior to this competition, the existing world and Pan Pacific records were as follows:

World record	He Cihong (CHN)	1:00.16	Rome, Italy	September 10, 1994
Pan Pacific Championships record	Janie Wagstaff (USA)	1:01.00	Edmonton, Canada	August 22, 1991

== Results ==
All times are in minutes and seconds.

KEY:	q	Fastest non-qualifiers	Q	Qualified	CR	Championships record	NR	National record	PB	Personal best	SB	Seasonal best

=== Heats ===
The first round was held on August 23.

Rank	Name	Nationality	Time	Notes
1	Noriko Inada	Japan	1:02.14	Q
2	Mai Nakamura	Japan	1:02.49	Q
3	Barbara Bedford	United States	1:02.57	Q
4	Erin Gammel	Canada	1:02.85	Q
5	Dyana Calub	Australia	1:03.18	Q
6	Elli Overton	Australia	1:03.19	Q
7	Miki Nakao	Japan	1:03.24	Q
8	Kelly Stefanyshyn	Canada	1:03.60	Q
9	Charlene Wittstock	South Africa	1:03.72	Q
10	Giaan Rooney	Australia	1:03.73	Q
11	Danielle Lewis	Australia	1:03.77	Q
12	Lia Oberstar	United States	1:03.95	Q
13	Choi Soo-min	South Korea	1:04.20	Q
14	Nikki Tanner	New Zealand	1:04.58	Q
15	Monique Robins	New Zealand	1:04.97	Q
16	Megan McMahon	Australia	1:05.69	
17	Renate du Plessis	South Africa	1:06.02	Q
18	Helen Norfolk	New Zealand	1:07.59	
19	Caroline Pickering	Fiji	1:07.85	
20	Carissa Thompson	New Zealand	1:07.90	

=== Semifinals ===
The semifinals were held on August 23.

Rank	Name	Nationality	Time	Notes
1	Mai Nakamura	Japan	1:02.07	Q
2	Noriko Inada	Japan	1:02.27	Q
3	Barbara Bedford	United States	1:02.29	Q
4	Erin Gammel	Canada	1:02.41	Q
5	Miki Nakao	Japan	1:02.89	
6	Kelly Stefanyshyn	Canada	1:03.17	Q
7	Dyana Calub	Australia	1:03.18	Q
8	Elli Overton	Australia	1:03.20	Q
9	Giaan Rooney	Australia	1:03.37	
10	Lia Oberstar	United States	1:03.54	Q
11	Danielle Lewis	Australia	1:03.59	
12	Charlene Wittstock	South Africa	1:03.60	
13	Nikki Tanner	New Zealand	1:04.18	
14	Choi Soo-min	South Korea	1:04.20	
15	Monique Robins	New Zealand	1:04.73	
16	Renate du Plessis	South Africa	1:05.84	

=== Final ===
The final was held on August 24.

Rank	Lane	Nationality	Time	Notes
1st place, gold medalist(s)	Dyana Calub	Australia	1:01.51	CWR
1st place, gold medalist(s)	Mai Nakamura	Japan	1:01.51	
3rd place, bronze medalist(s)	Barbara Bedford	United States	1:01.76	
4	Noriko Inada	Japan	1:01.79	
5	Erin Gammel	Canada	1:02.67	
6	Kelly Stefanyshyn	Canada	1:02.91	
7	Elli Overton	Australia	1:03.47	
8	Lia Oberstar	United States	1:03.75	
