= Swimming at the 2000 Summer Olympics – Women's 200 metre backstroke =

Women's 200 metre backstroke at the Games of the XXVII Olympiad
- Venue: Sydney International Aquatic Centre
- Date: September 21, 2000 (heats & semifinals); September 22, 2000 (final)
- Competitors: 36 from 29 nations
- Winning time: 2:08.16

Medalists
1st place, gold medalist(s)		Diana Mocanu	Romania
2nd place, silver medalist(s)		Roxana Maracineanu	France
3rd place, bronze medalist(s)		Miki Nakao	Japan

The women's 200 metre backstroke event at the 2000 Summer Olympics took place on 21–22 September at the Sydney International Aquatic Centre in Sydney, Australia.

Diana Mocanu emerged as a newcomer on the international swimming, after effortlessly winning her second gold at these Games. She maintained a lead from start to finish, and posted a new Romanian record of 2:08.16, the third-fastest of all time, making her the fourth swimmer in Olympic history to strike a backstroke double, since Ulrike Richter did so in 1976, Rica Reinisch in 1980, and Krisztina Egerszegi, the three-time champion in the event, in 1992. France's world champion Roxana Maracineanu, born with Romanian heritage, seized off an early lead on the first length, but fell short only for the silver in 2:10.25. Japan's Miki Nakao powered home with the bronze in 2:11.05 to hold off her fast-pacing teammate Tomoko Hagiwara (2:11.21) by 16-hundredths of a second.

U.S. swimmer Amanda Adkins improved a lifetime best of 2:12.35 to move herself up from seventh to fifth spot on the final half, finishing ahead of Spain's Nina Zhivanevskaya (2:12.75), the bronze medalist in the 100 m backstroke five days earlier, by four-tenths of a second (0.40). Meanwhile, Germany's Antje Buschschulte (2:13.31) and Canada's Kelly Stefanyshyn (2:14.57) rounded out the finale.

== Records ==
Prior to this competition, the existing world and Olympic records were as follows.

World record	Krisztina Egerszegi (HUN)	2:06.62	Athens, Greece	25 August 1991
Olympic record	Krisztina Egerszegi (HUN)	2:07.06	Barcelona, Spain	31 July 1992

== Results ==
=== Heats ===
Rank	Heat	Lane	Name	Nationality	Time	Notes
1	3	5	Diana Mocanu	Romania	2:09.21	Q, NR
2	5	3	Roxana Maracineanu	France	2:11.01	Q, NR
3	5	4	Nina Zhivanevskaya	Spain	2:11.60	Q
4	4	4	Miki Nakao	Japan	2:11.69	Q
5	3	4	Tomoko Hagiwara	Japan	2:12.15	Q
6	4	6	Lindsay Benko	United States	2:12.72	Q
7	4	3	Joanna Fargus	Great Britain	2:12.99	Q
8	5	5	Antje Buschschulte	Germany	2:13.42	Q
9	5	6	Amanda Adkins	United States	2:13.54	Q
10	5	7	Louise Ørnstedt	Denmark	2:13.61	Q, NR
11	3	3	Cathleen Rund	Germany	2:13.87	Q
12	4	5	Helen Don-Duncan	Great Britain	2:14.18	Q
13	3	6	Kelly Stefanyshyn	Canada	2:14.28	Q
14	3	2	Clementine Stoney	Australia	2:14.61	Q
15	3	7	Ivette María	Spain	2:14.78	Q
16	3	1	Charlene Wittstock	South Africa	2:15.10	Q
17	2	2	Nadiya Beshevli	Ukraine	2:15.86	NR
18	4	7	Zhan Shu	China	2:15.97	
19	4	1	Irina Raevskaya	Russia	2:16.13	
20	4	8	Helen Norfolk	New Zealand	2:16.22	
21	2	4	Anu Koivisto	Finland	2:16.23	
22	5	8	Yseult Gervy	Belgium	2:16.67	
23	5	1	Aleksandra Miciul	Poland	2:16.71	
24	4	2	Dyana Calub	Australia	2:17.05	
25	2	5	Aikaterini Bliamou	Greece	2:18.07	
26	2	3	Ana María González	Cuba	2:19.35	
27	2	8	Jana Korbasová	Slovakia	2:19.37	NR
28	2	6	Annamária Kiss	Hungary	2:20.40	
29	2	7	Şadan Derya Erke	Turkey	2:21.28	
30	2	1	Chonlathorn Vorathamrong	Thailand	2:21.59	
31	1	5	Marica Stražmešter	FR Yugoslavia	2:22.59	
32	1	3	Kolbrún Yr Kristjánsdóttir	Iceland	2:24.33	
33	1	6	Kuan Chia-hsien	Chinese Taipei	2:24.61	
34	1	4	Petra Banović	Croatia	2:25.42	
35	3	8	Choi Soo-min	South Korea	2:26.42	
	5	2	Yuliya Fomenko	Russia	DNS	

=== Semifinals ===
==== Semifinal 1 ====
Rank	Lane	Name	Nationality	Time	Notes
1	4	Roxana Maracineanu	France	2:11.93	Q
2	5	Miki Nakao	Japan	2:12.49	Q
3	6	Antje Buschschulte	Germany	2:12.64	Q
4	3	Lindsay Benko	United States	2:13.73	
5	7	Louise Ørnstedt	Denmark	2:14.24	
6	1	Clementine Stoney	Australia	2:14.25	
7	8	Charlene Wittstock	South Africa	2:14.95	
8	2	Helen Don-Duncan	Great Britain	2:14.97	

==== Semifinal 2 ====
Rank	Lane	Name	Nationality	Time	Notes
1	4	Diana Mocanu	Romania	2:09.64	Q
2	3	Tomoko Hagiwara	Japan	2:11.02	Q
3	5	Nina Zhivanevskaya	Spain	2:11.93	Q
4	2	Amanda Adkins	United States	2:12.97	Q
5	1	Kelly Stefanyshyn	Canada	2:13.39	Q
6	6	Joanna Fargus	Great Britain	2:13.57	
7	7	Cathleen Rund	Germany	2:13.85	
8	8	Ivette María	Spain	2:15.11	

=== Final ===
Rank	Lane	Name	Nationality	Time	Notes
1st place, gold medalist(s)	4	Diana Mocanu	Romania	2:08.16	NR
2nd place, silver medalist(s)	3	Roxana Maracineanu	France	2:10.25	NR
3rd place, bronze medalist(s)	2	Miki Nakao	Japan	2:11.05	
4	5	Tomoko Hagiwara	Japan	2:11.21	
5	1	Amanda Adkins	United States	2:12.35	
6	6	Nina Zhivanevskaya	Spain	2:12.75	
7	7	Antje Buschschulte	Germany	2:13.31	
8	8	Kelly Stefanyshyn	Canada	2:14.57	
