= 2006 Pan Pacific Swimming Championships – Women's 100 metre backstroke =

Women's 100 metre backstroke at the 2006 Pan Pacific Swimming Championships
- Venue: Saanich Commonwealth Place
- Dates: August 17, 2006 (heats & finals)
- Competitors: 29 from 12 nations
- Winning time: 1:00.63

Medalists
gold medal	Hanae Ito	Japan
silver medal	Natalie Coughlin	United States
bronze medal	Reiko Nakamura	Japan

The women's 100 metre backstroke competition at the 2006 Pan Pacific Swimming Championships took place on August 17 at the Saanich Commonwealth Place. The last champion was Natalie Coughlin of US.

This race consisted of two lengths of the pool, all in backstroke.

== Records ==
Prior to this competition, the existing world and Pan Pacific records were as follows:

World record	Natalie Coughlin (USA)	59.58	Fort Lauderdale, United States	August 13, 2002
Pan Pacific Championships record	Natalie Coughlin (USA)	59.72	Yokohama, Japan	August 26, 2002

== Results ==
All times are in minutes and seconds.

KEY:	q	Fastest non-qualifiers	Q	Qualified	CR	Championships record	NR	National record	PB	Personal best	SB	Seasonal best

=== Heats ===
The first round was held on August 17, at 10:39.

Rank	Heat	Lane	Name	Nationality	Time	Notes
1	4	4	Natalie Coughlin	United States	1:00.06	QA
2	4	5	Reiko Nakamura	Japan	1:00.97	QA
3	3	4	Hanae Ito	Japan	1:01.32	QA
4	2	5	Lauren English	United States	1:01.68	QA
5	3	5	Leila Vaziri	United States	1:01.82	QA
6	4	3	Margaret Hoelzer	United States	1:01.93	QA
7	2	3	Fran Adcock	Australia	1:01.95	QA
8	4	7	Liz Coster	New Zealand	1:02.04	QA
9	2	4	Hannah McLean	New Zealand	1:02.13	QB
10	2	6	Joanna Fargus	Australia	1:02.36	QB
11	4	2	Ariana Kukors	United States	1:02.42	QB
12	3	3	Takami Igarashi	Japan	1:02.46	QB
13	3	7	Erin Gammel	Canada	1:02.59	QB
14	2	2	Karina Leame	Australia	1:02.60	QB
15	3	6	Kelly Stefanyshyn	Canada	1:02.69	QB
16	3	1	Kirsty Coventry	Zimbabwe	1:02.70	QB
17	2	1	Elizabeth Beisel	United States	1:02.80	
18	4	6	Melissa Ingram	New Zealand	1:02.90	
19	3	8	Tsai Hiu-Wai	Hong Kong	1:03.14	
20	4	8	Lee Nam-Eun	South Korea	1:03.23	
21	4	1	Jung Yoo-Jin	South Korea	1:03.56	
22	2	8	Fabíola Molina	Brazil	1:03.69	
23	1	4	Karah Stanworth	Canada	1:03.73	
24	2	7	Liu Zhen	China	1:04.17	
25	1	2	Seana Mitchell	Canada	1:05.82	
26	1	3	Hannah Wilson	Hong Kong	1:05.91	
27	3	2	Melissa Corfe	South Africa	1:05.95	
28	1	5	He Hsu-Jung	Chinese Taipei	1:06.31	
29	1	6	Lin Ting-Wei	Chinese Taipei	1:08.91	

=== B Final ===
The B final was held on August 17, at 19:12.

Rank	Lane	Name	Nationality	Time	Notes
9	4	Leila Vaziri	United States	1:01.53	
10	7	Kirsty Coventry	Zimbabwe	1:01.72	
11	5	Takami Igarashi	Japan	1:02.23	
12	6	Karina Leame	Australia	1:02.52	
13	2	Kelly Stefanyshyn	Canada	1:02.54	
14	8	Tsai Hiu-Wai	Hong Kong	1:03.12	
15	1	Melissa Ingram	New Zealand	1:03.21	
16	3	Erin Gammel	Canada	1:03.24	

=== A Final ===
The A final was held on August 17, at 19:12.

Rank	Lane	Name	Nationality	Time	Notes
1st place, gold medalist(s)	3	Hanae Ito	Japan	1:00.63	
2nd place, silver medalist(s)	4	Natalie Coughlin	United States	1:00.66	
3rd place, bronze medalist(s)	5	Reiko Nakamura	Japan	1:00.86	
4	6	Hannah McLean	New Zealand	1:01.53	
5	2	Liz Coster	New Zealand	1:01.75	
6	7	Fran Adcock	Australia	1:02.08	
7	1	Joanna Fargus	Australia	1:02.21	
8	8	Lauren English	United States	1:02.27	
