= Swimming at the 2000 Summer Olympics – Women's 100 metre backstroke =

Women's 100 metre backstroke at the Games of the XXVII Olympiad
- Venue: Sydney International Aquatic Centre
- Date: September 17, 2000 (heats & semifinals); September 18, 2000 (final)
- Competitors: 47 from 40 nations
- Winning time: 1:00.21 OR

Medalists
1st place, gold medalist(s)		Diana Mocanu	Romania
2nd place, silver medalist(s)		Mai Nakamura	Japan
3rd place, bronze medalist(s)		Nina Zhivanevskaya	Spain

The women's 100 metre backstroke event at the 2000 Summer Olympics took place on 17–18 September at the Sydney International Aquatic Centre in Sydney, Australia.

At only 16 years of age, Diana Mocanu made an Olympic milestone to become Romania's first ever gold medalist in swimming. She fought off a head-to-head sprint challenge from Japan's Mai Nakamura on the final stretch to hit the wall first in a new Olympic standard of 1:00.21, the second-fastest of all time, cutting off Krisztina Egerszegi's 1992 record by nearly half a second (0.50). Meanwhile, Nakamura seized off an early lead under a world-record pace (29.17), but ended up only with a silver medal in a Japanese record of 1:00.55. Competing previously for the Unified Team and Russia in two Olympics (1992 and 1996), Nina Zhivanevskaya made a surprise packet with a bronze for Spain in a sterling time of 1:00.89.

France's Roxana Maracineanu finished off the podium in fourth place at 1:01.10, and was followed in fifth by Nakamura's teammate Noriko Inada in 1:01.14. Coming from second at the final turn, U.S. swimmer Barbara Bedford faded down the stretch to pick up the sixth spot with a time of 1:01.47. Aussie favorite Dyana Calub (1:01.61) and Denmark's Louise Ørnstedt (1:02.02) closed out the field.

Notable swimmers missed out the top 8 final, featuring Germany's Antje Buschschulte, a pre-Olympic medal contender; South Africa's Charlene Wittstock, who eventually married to Albert II, Prince of Monaco in 2010; and Zimbabwe's Kirsty Coventry, who later emerged as one of the world's top backstroke swimmers in her decade.

== Records ==
Prior to this competition, the existing world and Olympic records were as follows.

World record	He Cihong (CHN)	1:00.16	Rome, Italy	10 September 1994
Olympic record	Krisztina Egerszegi (HUN)	1:00.68	Barcelona, Spain	28 July 1992

The following new world and Olympic records were set during this competition.

Date	Event	Name	Nationality	Time	Record
18 September	Final	Diana Mocanu	Romania	1:00.21	OR

== Results ==
=== Heats ===
Rank	Heat	Lane	Name	Nationality	Time	Notes
1	6	4	Mai Nakamura	Japan	1:00.88	Q
2	6	3	Diana Mocanu	Romania	1:01.18	Q, NR
3	4	2	Roxana Maracineanu	France	1:01.66	Q, NR
4	4	3	Barbara Bedford	United States	1:01.70	Q
5	4	4	Nina Zhivanevskaya	Spain	1:01.97	Q
6	6	6	Louise Ørnstedt	Denmark	1:01.98	Q
7	5	6	Zhan Shu	China	1:02.19	Q
7	6	5	Noriko Inada	Japan	1:02.19	Q
9	5	4	Antje Buschschulte	Germany	1:02.23	Q
10	4	5	Dyana Calub	Australia	1:02.46	Q
11	5	3	Katy Sexton	Great Britain	1:02.67	Q
12	5	2	Kelly Stefanyshyn	Canada	1:02.78	Q
13	5	5	Sandra Völker	Germany	1:02.88	Q
14	6	1	Michelle Lischinsky	Canada	1:02.89	Q
15	4	1	Lu Donghua	China	1:02.91	Q
16	3	6	Kirsty Coventry	Zimbabwe	1:03.05	Q, NR
17	4	7	Charlene Wittstock	South Africa	1:03.18	
18	6	2	Courtney Shealy	United States	1:03.19	
19	5	7	Giaan Rooney	Australia	1:03.20	
19	3	3	Shim Min-ji	South Korea	1:03.20	NR
21	4	6	Sarah Price	Great Britain	1:03.22	
22	6	7	Ilona Hlaváčková	Czech Republic	1:03.28	
23	5	1	Anu Koivisto	Finland	1:03.44	
24	6	8	Fabíola Molina	Brazil	1:03.68	
25	5	8	Aleksandra Miciul	Poland	1:04.51	
26	3	5	Monique Robins	New Zealand	1:04.52	
27	3	7	Sofie Wolfs	Belgium	1:04.66	
27	3	1	Nadiya Beshevli	Ukraine	1:04.66	
29	3	2	Irina Raevskaya	Russia	1:04.76	
30	3	4	Ana María González	Cuba	1:04.95	
31	2	4	Camilla Johansson	Sweden	1:04.99	
32	3	8	Aikaterini Bliamou	Greece	1:05.09	
33	2	2	Hiu Wai Sherry Tsai	Hong Kong	1:05.28	
34	4	8	Brenda Starink	Netherlands	1:05.93	
35	2	3	Chonlathorn Vorathamrong	Thailand	1:05.98	
36	2	6	Annamária Kiss	Hungary	1:06.12	
37	1	6	Marie-Lizza Danila	Philippines	1:06.48	
38	2	8	Elsa Manora Nasution	Indonesia	1:06.57	
38	2	1	Serrana Fernández	Uruguay	1:06.57	
40	2	7	Kuan Chia-hsien	Chinese Taipei	1:07.18	
41	1	4	Marica Stražmešter	FR Yugoslavia	1:07.21	
42	1	3	Şadan Derya Erke	Turkey	1:07.26	
43	1	5	Kolbrún Ýr Kristjánsdóttir	Iceland	1:07.28	
44	1	2	Anjelika Solovieva	Kyrgyzstan	1:07.63	
45	1	7	Andrea Prono	Paraguay	1:08.11	
46	1	1	Monika Bakale	Republic of the Congo	1:16.36	
	2	5	Tessa Solomon	Netherlands Antilles	DNS	

=== Semifinals ===
==== Semifinal 1 ====
Rank	Lane	Name	Nationality	Time	Notes
1	4	Diana Mocanu	Romania	1:00.70	Q, NR
2	5	Barbara Bedford	United States	1:01.61	Q
3	3	Louise Ørnstedt	Denmark	1:01.69	Q, NR
4	2	Dyana Calub	Australia	1:01.86	Q
5	7	Kelly Stefanyshyn	Canada	1:02.35	
6	8	Kirsty Coventry	Zimbabwe	1:02.54	NR
7	1	Michelle Lischinsky	Canada	1:02.55	
8	6	Zhan Shu	China	1:02.92	

==== Semifinal 2 ====
Rank	Lane	Name	Nationality	Time	Notes
1	4	Mai Nakamura	Japan	1:01.07	Q
2	6	Noriko Inada	Japan	1:01.25	Q
3	3	Nina Zhivanevskaya	Spain	1:01.41	Q
4	5	Roxana Maracineanu	France	1:01.61	Q, NR
5	2	Antje Buschschulte	Germany	1:01.91	
6	7	Katy Sexton	Great Britain	1:02.35	
7	1	Sandra Völker	Germany	1:03.01	
8	8	Lu Donghua	China	1:03.31	

=== Final ===
Rank	Lane	Name	Nationality	Time	Notes
1st place, gold medalist(s)	4	Diana Mocanu	Romania	1:00.21	OR, ER
2nd place, silver medalist(s)	5	Mai Nakamura	Japan	1:00.55	NR
3rd place, bronze medalist(s)	6	Nina Zhivanevskaya	Spain	1:00.89	NR
4	7	Roxana Maracineanu	France	1:01.10	NR
5	3	Noriko Inada	Japan	1:01.14	
6	2	Barbara Bedford	United States	1:01.47	
7	8	Dyana Calub	Australia	1:01.61	
8	1	Louise Ørnstedt	Denmark	1:02.02	
