= 2002 Pan Pacific Swimming Championships – Women's 100 metre butterfly =

Women's 100 metre butterfly at the 2002 Pan Pacific Swimming Championships
- Venue: Yokohama International Swimming Pool
- Dates: August 24, 2002 (heats & semifinals); August 25, 2002 (final)
- Competitors: 29 from 8 nations
- Winning time: 57.88

Medalists
gold medal	Natalie Coughlin	United States
silver medal	Petria Thomas	Australia
bronze medal	Jenny Thompson	United States

The women's 100 metre butterfly competition at the 2002 Pan Pacific Swimming Championships took place on August 24–25 at the Yokohama International Swimming Pool. The last champion was Jenny Thompson of US.

This race consisted of two lengths of the pool, all in butterfly.

== Records ==
Prior to this competition, the existing world and Pan Pacific records were as follows:

World record	Inge de Bruijn (NED)	56.61	Sydney, Australia	September 17, 2000
Pan Pacific Championships record	Jenny Thompson (USA)	57.88	Sydney, Australia	August 23, 1999

== Results ==
All times are in minutes and seconds.

KEY:	q	Fastest non-qualifiers	Q	Qualified	CR	Championships record	NR	National record	PB	Personal best	SB	Seasonal best

=== Heats ===
The first round was held on August 24.

Rank	Heat	Lane	Name	Nationality	Time	Notes
1	4	4	Natalie Coughlin	United States	58.49	Q
2	2	4	Jenny Thompson	United States	58.90	Q
3	3	4	Petria Thomas	Australia	59.19	Q
4	2	5	Dana Kirk	United States	1:00.04	Q
5	4	3	Yuko Nakanishi	Japan	1:00.14	Q
6	4	6	Jen Button	Canada	1:00.21	Q
7	2	3	Margaret Hoelzer	United States	1:00.24	Q
8	4	2	Audrey Lacroix	Canada	1:00.38	Q
9	3	5	Mary Descenza	United States	1:00.50	Q
10	2	6	Rachel Coffee	Australia	1:00.76	Q
11	2	1	Heidi Crawford	Australia	1:00.82	Q
11	2	2	Felicity Galvez	Australia	1:00.82	Q
13	3	3	Zhou Yafei	China	1:00.92	Q
14	3	7	Alice Mills	Australia	1:01.16	Q
15	4	5	Maki Mita	Japan	1:01.38	Q
16	3	6	Joscelin Yeo	Singapore	1:01.46	Q
17	2	7	Courtney Shealy	United States	1:01.47	
18	3	8	Mary Hill	United States	1:01.68	
19	3	1	Jennifer Fratesi	Canada	1:01.83	
20	3	2	Yurie Yano	Japan	1:01.86	
21	4	1	Jessica Deglau	Canada	1:02.12	
22	4	7	Liu Yin	China	1:02.55	
23	4	8	Elizabeth Collins	Canada	1:02.75	
24	2	8	Megan Allan	New Zealand	1:03.03	
25	1	5	Elizabeth Van Welie	New Zealand	1:03.22	
26	1	2	Rhiannon Jeffrey	United States	1:03.77	
27	1	3	Wing Suet Chan	Hong Kong	1:03.93	
28	1	6	Amanda Gillespie	Canada	1:04.26	
29	1	4	Nathalie Bernard	New Zealand	1:04.58	

=== Semifinals ===
The semifinals were held on August 24.

Rank	Heat	Lane	Name	Nationality	Time	Notes
1	2	5	Petria Thomas	Australia	58.20	Q
2	2	4	Natalie Coughlin	United States	58.44	Q
3	1	4	Jenny Thompson	United States	58.83	Q
4	1	3	Jen Button	Canada	59.76	Q
5	2	3	Yuko Nakanishi	Japan	1:00.09	Q
6	1	5	Dana Kirk	United States	1:00.16	Q
7	1	6	Audrey Lacroix	Canada	1:00.34	Q
8	2	2	Rachel Coffee	Australia	1:00.50	Q
9	2	1	Maki Mita	Japan	1:00.67	
10	2	6	Margaret Hoelzer	United States	1:00.67	
11	1	7	Zhou Yafei	China	1:00.80	
12	1	8	Yurie Yano	Japan	1:00.87	
13	2	7	Felicity Galvez	Australia	1:01.29	
14	1	1	Joscelin Yeo	Singapore	1:01.42	
15	1	2	Heidi Crawford	Australia	1:01.63	
16	2	8	Jennifer Fratesi	Canada	1:01.86	

=== Final ===
The final was held on August 25.

Rank	Lane	Name	Nationality	Time	Notes
1st place, gold medalist(s)	5	Natalie Coughlin	United States	57.88	=CR
2nd place, silver medalist(s)	4	Petria Thomas	Australia	58.11	
3rd place, bronze medalist(s)	3	Jenny Thompson	United States	58.64	
4	6	Jen Button	Canada	59.68	
5	2	Yuko Nakanishi	Japan	59.77	
6	7	Audrey Lacroix	Canada	1:00.31	
7	1	Rachel Coffee	Australia	1:00.71	
8	8	Maki Mita	Japan	1:00.89	
