= Karen Lee =

Karen Lee may refer to:

- Karen Lee (swimmer) (born 1983), British Olympic swimmer
- Karen Lee (politician) (born 1959), Former British Labour Party MP for Lincoln
- Karen An-hwei Lee (born 1973), Chinese-American poet

== See also ==
- Karen Li (born 1977), New Zealand table tennis player
