= Lee Da-hye =

Lee Da-hye may refer to:

- Lee Da-hye (Go player) (born 1985), South Korean Go player
- Lee Da-hye (swimmer) (born 1987), South Korean swimmer
- Lee Da-hye (footballer) (born 1992), South Korean female association footballer
- Lee Da-hye (cheerleader) (born 1999), South Korean cheerleader

== See also ==
- Lee Da-hae (born 1984), Korean Australian actress
