= Amanda Adkins =

Amanda Adkins may refer to:

- Amanda Adkins (politician) (born 1974/1975), American politician and businesswoman
- Amanda Adkins (swimmer) (born 1976), American competition swimmer
