= Choi Soo-min =

South Korean swimmer (born 1981)

Personal information
- Full name: Choi Soo-min
- National team: South Korea
- Born: 12 April 1981 (age 45) Seoul, South Korea
- Height: 1.65 m (5 ft 5 in)
- Weight: 53 kg (117 lb)

Sport
- Sport: Swimming
- Strokes: Backstroke
Medal record
Women's swimming
Representing South Korea
Asian Games
Bronze medal – third place	1998 Bangkok	100 m backstroke

Choi Soo-min (Korean: 최수민; RR: Choe Sumin; born April 12, 1981) is a South Korean former swimmer, who specialized in backstroke events. She won a bronze medal, as a 17-year-old, at the 1998 Asian Games, and later represented South Korea at the 2000 Summer Olympics.

Choi made her own swimming history at the 1998 Asian Games in Bangkok, Thailand, where she captured a bronze medal in the 100 m backstroke at 1:03.37, finishing behind Japanese duo Mai Nakamura and Tomoko Hagiwara by more than a full body length.

At the 2000 Summer Olympics in Sydney, Choi swam only in the women's 200 m backstroke. She achieved a FINA B-cut of 2:15.71 from the Asian Championships in Busan. She challenged seven other swimmers in heat three, including Hagiwara, Australia's top favorite Clementine Stoney, and Romania's Diana Mocanu, who later dominated the backstroke double at these Games. Racing against some of the toughest swimmers in her heat, Choi struggled to keep up her pace on the outside lane, and eventually rounded out the field to last place in a time of 2:26.42, the slowest of the event's heats. Choi failed to advance into the semifinals, as she placed thirty-fifth overall in the prelims.
