= Swimming at the 2003 Pan American Games – Women's 100 metre backstroke =

The Women's 100m Backstroke event at the 2003 Pan American Games took place on August 14, 2003 (Day 13 of the Games).

At this race, Gisela Morales won the first medal of her country in swimming at Pan American Games at all times.

== Medalists ==
Gold	Diana MacManus; United States
Silver	Courtney Shealy; United States
Bronze	Gisela Morales; Guatemala

== Records ==
World Record	Natalie Coughlin (USA)	59.58	2002-08-13	(United States) Fort Lauderdale, Florida
Pan Am Record	Barbara Bedford (USA)	1:01.71	1995-03-14	Mar del Plata, Argentina

== Results ==
Place	Swimmer	Heats		Final
Place	Swimmer	Time	Rank	Time
1	Diana MacManus (USA)	1:04.28	2	1:02.50
2	Courtney Shealy (USA)	1:02.79	1	1:02.74
3	Gisela Morales (GUA)	1:04.50	3	1:04.56
4	Danielle de Alba (MEX)	1:04.79	4	1:04.91
5	Serrana Fernández (URU)	1:05.42	6	1:05.15
6	Kiera Aitken (BER)	1:04.98	5	1:06.03
7	Paula Baracho (BRA)	1:06.27	7	1:06.22
8	Talita Ribeiro (BRA)	1:06.68	8	1:06.39
9	Emily Busquets (PUR)	1:06.99	9	1:06.61
10	Valeria Silva (PER)	1:07.83	12	1:07.43
11	Gretchen Gotay (PUR)	1:07.95	13	1:08.15
12	Silvie Ketelaars (AHO)	1:09.18	15	1:08.76
13	Fatima Valderrama (PER)	1:07.74	11	1:08.80
14	Marianella Marín (CRC)	1:09.24	16	1:08.98
15	Ayeisha Collymore (TRI)	1:09.39	17	1:09.66
16	Diana Caceres (ECU)	1:09.75	18	1:10.39
--	Carolina Rivera (VEN)	1:07.20	10	scratched
--	María Costanzo (PAR)	1:08.49	14	scratched
19	Laura Rodríguez (DOM)	1:10.05	19	
20	Alana Dilette (BAH)	1:10.07	20	
