= 2010 Pan Pacific Swimming Championships – Women's 100 metre freestyle =

Women's 100 metre freestyle at the 2010 Pan Pacific Swimming Championships
- Venue: William Woollett Jr. Aquatics Center
- Dates: August 19, 2010 (heats & finals)
- Competitors: 49 from 7 nations
- Winning time: 53.67

Medalists
gold medal	Natalie Coughlin	United States
silver medal	Emily Seebohm	Australia
silver medal	Dana Vollmer	United States

The women's 100 metre freestyle competition at the 2010 Pan Pacific Swimming Championships took place on August 19 at the William Woollett Jr. Aquatics Center. The last champion was Natalie Coughlin of US.

This race consisted of two lengths of the pool, both lengths being in freestyle.

== Records ==
Prior to this competition, the existing world and Pan Pacific records were as follows:

World record	Britta Steffen (GER)	52.07	Rome, Italy	July 31, 2009
Pan Pacific Championships record	Amanda Weir (USA)	53.76	Victoria, Canada	August 19, 2006

== Results ==
All times are in minutes and seconds.

KEY:	q	Fastest non-qualifiers	Q	Qualified	CR	Championships record	NR	National record	PB	Personal best	SB	Seasonal best

=== Heats ===
The first round was held on August 19, at 10:00.

Rank	Heat	Lane	Name	Nationality	Time	Notes
1	7	4	Dana Vollmer	United States	54.01	QA
2	7	5	Natalie Coughlin	United States	54.09	QA
3	5	2	Yolane Kukla	Australia	54.17	QA
4	6	4	Jessica Hardy	United States	54.35	QA
5	6	1	Victoria Poon	Canada	54.44	QA
6	6	3	Amanda Weir	United States	54.50	QA
7	7	3	Kara Lynn Joyce	United States	54.59	QA
8	5	5	Emily Seebohm	Australia	54.65	QA
9	5	3	Alicia Coutts	Australia	54.79	QB
10	7	6	Haruka Ueda	Japan	54.93	QB
11	5	1	Felicity Galvez	Australia	55.02	QB
12	4	4	Kelly Stubbins	Australia	55.06	QB
13	5	4	Marieke Guehrer	Australia	55.17	QB
13	7	7	Missy Franklin	United States	55.17	QB
15	1	5	Allison Schmitt	United States	55.19	QB
16	6	5	Hannah Wilson	Hong Kong	55.24	QB
17	6	2	Alice Mills	Australia	55.33	
18	6	6	Hayley Palmer	New Zealand	55.42	
19	4	8	Meagen Nay	Australia	55.43	
20	7	2	Morgan Scroggy	United States	55.46	
21	5	6	Tatiana Lemos	Brazil	55.52	
22	6	8	Yayoi Matsumoto	Japan	55.54	
23	3	4	Erica Morningstar	Canada	55.64	
24	3	5	Madison Kennedy	United States	55.67	
25	5	8	Angie Bainbridge	Australia	55.70	
26	3	5	Tomoko Hagiwara	Japan	55.73	
27	4	6	Hanae Ito	Japan	55.83	
28	3	2	Genevieve Saumur	Canada	55.89	
29	4	3	Tash Hind	New Zealand	55.90	
30	4	2	Christine Magnuson	United States	55.94	
31	3	8	Elizabeth Pelton	United States	55.96	
32	7	1	Bronte Barratt	Australia	56.01	
33	3	4	Sinead Russell	Canada	56.02	
34	2	1	Samantha Cheverton	Canada	56.40	
34	7	8	Flávia Delaroli	Brazil	56.40	
36	2	4	Alexandra Gabor	Canada	56.41	
37	3	6	Amaka Gessler	New Zealand	56.48	
37	6	7	Katie Hoff	United States	56.48	
39	4	1	Hannah Riordan	Canada	56.53	
40	3	7	Penny Marshall	New Zealand	56.55	
41	3	1	Julyana Kury	Brazil	56.61	
42	4	1	Audrey Lacroix	Canada	56.67	
42	4	1	Barbara Jardin	Canada	56.67	
44	4	1	Kathleen Hersey	United States	56.78	
45	1	4	MacKenzie Downing	Canada	56.84	
46	2	6	Lauren Boyle	New Zealand	56.96	
47	2	2	Risa Sekine	Japan	57.01	
48	2	8	Akane Hoshi	Japan	58.12	
49	1	3	Manuella Lyrio	Brazil	58.26	
-	4	7	Stephanie Rice	Australia	DNS	
-	5	7	Sally Foster	Australia	DNS	

=== B Final ===
The B final was held on August 19, at 18:05.

Rank	Lane	Name	Nationality	Time	Notes
9	4	Jessica Hardy	United States	54.16	
10	5	Alicia Coutts	Australia	54.77	
11	6	Yayoi Matsumoto	Japan	55.22	
12	3	Tatiana Lemos	Brazil	55.28	
13	2	Erica Morningstar	Canada	55.61	
14	7	Tomoko Hagiwara	Japan	55.95	
15	1	Flávia Delaroli	Brazil	56.21	
16	8	Sinead Russell	Canada	56.23	

=== A Final ===
The A final was held on August 19, at 18:05.

Rank	Lane	Name	Nationality	Time	Notes
1st place, gold medalist(s)	5	Natalie Coughlin	United States	53.67	CR
2nd place, silver medalist(s)	2	Emily Seebohm	Australia	53.96	
2nd place, silver medalist(s)	4	Dana Vollmer	United States	53.96	
4	3	Yolane Kukla	Australia	54.02	
5	6	Victoria Poon	Canada	54.45	
6	7	Haruka Ueda	Japan	54.93	
7	1	Hannah Wilson	Hong Kong	55.32	
8	8	Hayley Palmer	New Zealand	56.04	
