= Aleksandra Miciul =

Polish swimmer (born 1982)

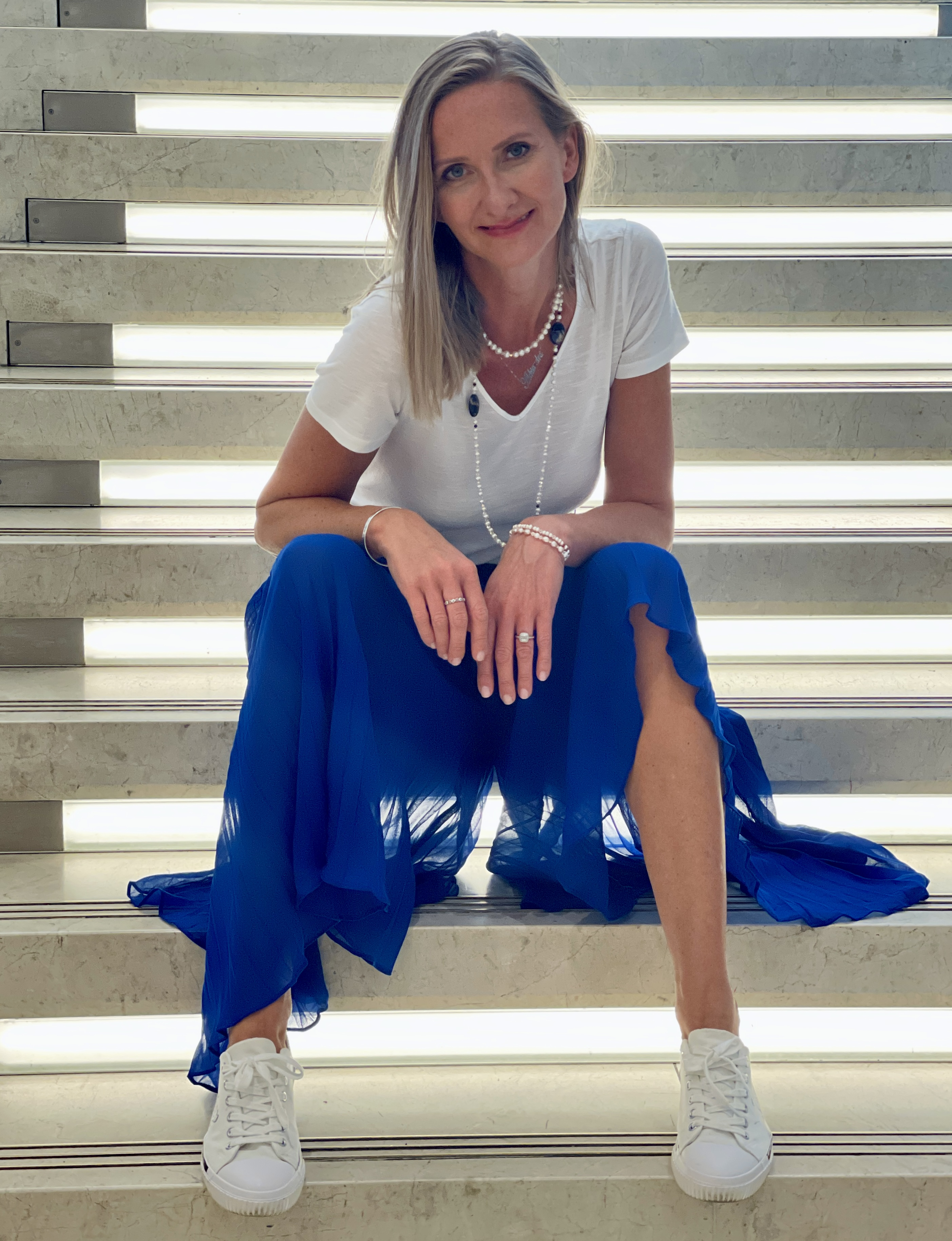

Personal information
- National team: Poland
- Born: 28 December 1982 (age 43) Sulechów, Poland
- Height: 1.79 m (5 ft 10 in)
- Weight: 60 kg (132 lb)
- Website: www.aleksandramiciul.com

Sport
- Sport: Swimming
- Strokes: Backstroke
- Club: Novita Zielona Góra
- College team: Southern Methodist University (U.S.)
- Coach: Jacek Miciul (PL), Steve Collins (U.S.)

Aleksandra Miciul (born 28 December 1982) is a Polish former swimmer who specialized in backstroke events. She represented Poland, as a 17-year-old, at the 2000 Summer Olympics, and also held numerous Polish records, long or short course, in a backstroke double, until they were all broken by Zuzanna Mazurek in 2008 and Alicja Tchorz in 2012.

Miciul attended the Southern Methodist University in Dallas, Texas, where she majored in international studies and swam for the SMU Mustangs swimming and diving team, under head coach Steve Collins, from 2002 to 2006. While swimming for the Mustangs, she earned a bronze medal in the 200-yard backstroke (2:00.92) at the 2003 Western Athletic Conference Championships, during her sophomore year.

Miciul competed in three swimming events at the 2000 Summer Olympics in Sydney. She achieved FINA A-standards of 1:03.17 (100 m backstroke) and 2:14.43 (200 m backstroke) from the European Championships in Helsinki, Finland. On the second day of the Games, Miciul placed twenty-fifth in the 100 m backstroke. Swimming in heat five, she rounded out the field to last place in 1:04.51, more than two body lengths behind leader Zhan Shu of China. Four days later, in the 200 m backstroke, Miciul posted a time of 2:16.71 from the final of five heats, but finished only in twenty-third place on the morning prelims. Miciul also teamed up with Alicja Pęczak, Anna Uryniuk, and Otylia Jędrzejczak in the 4×100 m medley relay. Leading off a backstroke leg in heat one, Miciul recorded a split of 1:04.18, but the Poles settled only for fourth place and twelfth overall in a final time of 4:11.08.
