= Teri McKeever =

American swimming coach

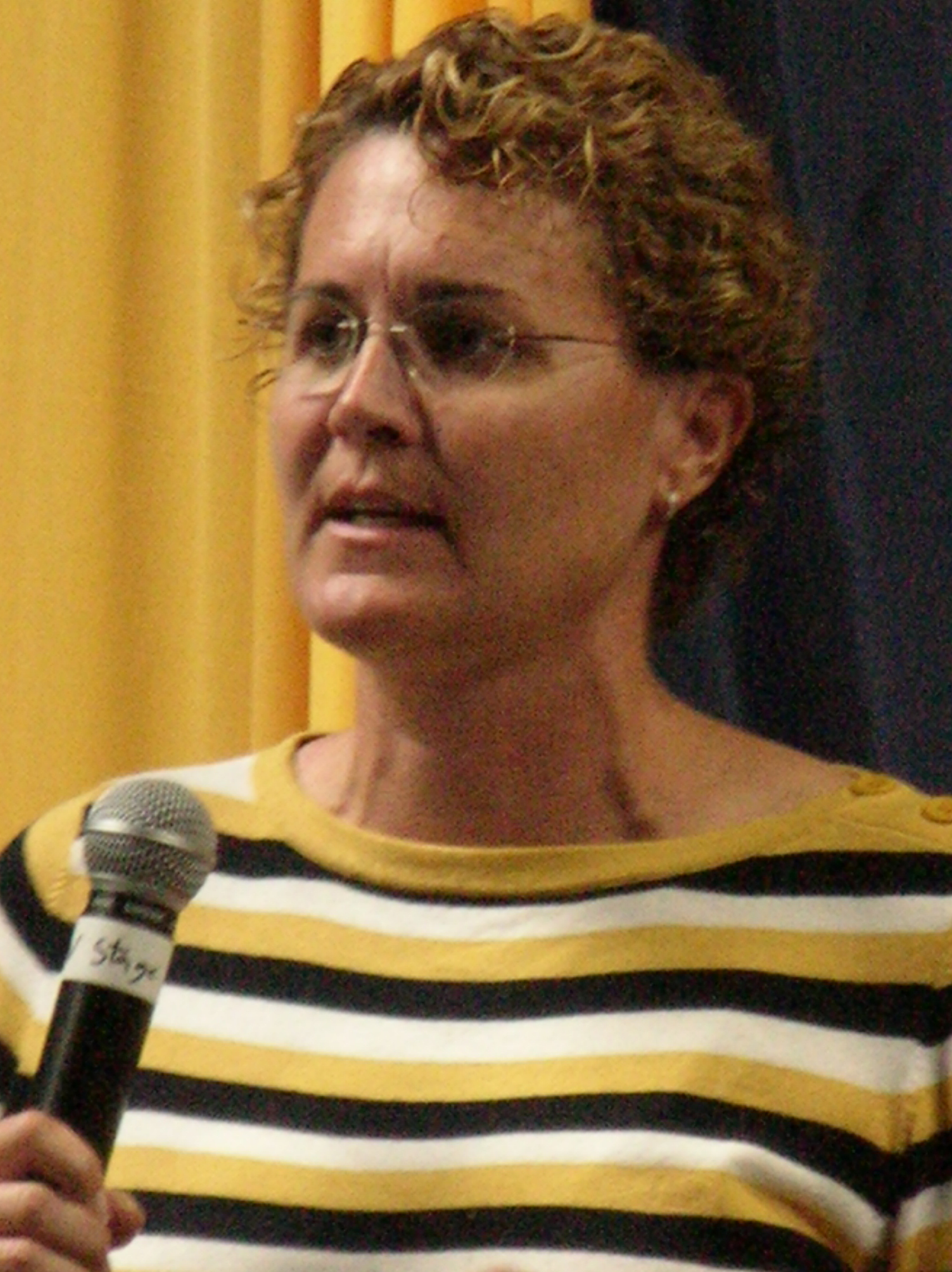
- McKeever at 2009 Coaches Tour

Biographical details
- Born: November 6, 1961 (age 64)
- Education: University of Southern California

Playing career
- 1980-1983: USC
- Position: Freestyle

Coaching career (HC unless noted)
- 1984-1987: USC Asst. Coach
- 1988-1992: Fresno State
- 1993–2023: University of California, Berkeley
- 2004: U.S. Olympic (Asst.)
- 2008: U.S. Olympic (Asst.)
- 2010: Pan Pac Championships
- 2010: World Championships (25m)
- 2012: U.S. Olympic
- 2020: U.S. Olympic (Asst.)

Accomplishments and honors

Championships
- 5 Pac-12 Championships (2009, 2012, 2014, 2015, 2021); 4 NCAA Championships (2009, 2011, 2012, 2015)

Terisa "Teri" J. McKeever (born November 6, 1961) is an American former college and Olympic swimming coach. She was the head coach of the California Golden Bears women's swimming team at the University of California, Berkeley, from 1993 until her firing in 2023. Her Cal Bears teams have won four NCAA national championships. McKeever served as an assistant coach for the United States Olympic women's swim team three times (2004, 2008, and 2020), and as the head coach of the 2012 U.S. Olympic women's swim team.

== Early years ==
McKeever was born on November 6, 1961, to athletic parents Judy and Mike McKeever, the oldest child in a family of ten children. Assuming various responsibilities early as the oldest sibling in a large family, she attended Escondido, California's San Pasqual High School where she was the first girl elected President of the Student Council. She started swimming and observing the role of a coach at an early age, with her mother Judy coaching her, her brothers, and other youngsters at the Hidden Valley Swim club in the 25-yard pool in their back yard. Demonstrating early talent, she began setting national age group records by the age of 12 and by 14 attended her first Olympic trials.

Her father, Mike McKeever, and her father's twin brother, Marlin McKeever, both attended the University of Southern California, and were both first-team All-American linemen for the USC Trojans football team in 1959. When Teri was only six years old, her father Mike died in 1967 from head injuries received in a 1965 car accident, after twenty-two months in a coma. Her mother later remarried, and had seven more children with her second husband. The family athletic influence remained strong, with all of her nine siblings participating in a variety of sports. Her sisters Kristi and Kelli were members of the U.S. national field hockey team.

== College career ==
McKeever attended the University of Southern California (USC), where she swam for the USC Trojans women's swimming and diving team under Hall of Fame Head Coach Peter Daland from 1980 to 1983 was a member of the international women's fraternity Alpha Gamma Delta by 1981. She competed in four NCAA national championships and contributed to the Trojans' four straight national top-ten finishes. She received All-America honors in swimming in 1980 and 1981, and following her 1983 senior season, was recognized as the university's outstanding student-athlete. She graduated from USC with a bachelor's degree in education in 1983, and later earned a master's degree in athletic administration in 1987.

== Coaching career ==
McKeever began coaching as an assistant coach at USC from 1984 to 1987. She was the head coach of the California Golden Bears women's swimming team at the University of California, Berkeley starting in the 1992–93 academic year. Since 1996–97 (her fifth season as head coach), her California Bears swim teams consistently finished among the top ten Division I college teams in the nation. The Bears women won five Pac-12 Conference team championships, and four NCAA national championships (2009, 2011, 2012, 2015). She was named Pacific-10 Conference Coach of the Year nine times and College Swimming Coaches Association of America (CSCAA) Coach of the Year five times.

After USC and before going to the Cal Bears, McKeever was the head coach of the Women's swimming team at Fresno State University in Fresno, California from 1988-1992.

McKeever's Cal Bears program has produced more than 25 members of the U.S. Olympic team, including Haley Cope, Natalie Coughlin, Emily Silver, Jessica Hardy, Dana Vollmer, Caitlin Leverenz, Rachel Bootsma, Missy Franklin, Kathleen Baker, and Abbey Weitzeil. Other notable swimmers include Elizabeth Pelton and Isabel Ivey. She served as an assistant coach for the United States Olympic women's swimming team at the 2004 Summer Olympics in Athens, Greece, and the 2008 Summer Olympics in Beijing, China.

In December 2010, she was selected as the head coach of the 2012 U.S. Olympic women's swim team that competed at the 2012 Summer Olympics in London. She was the first woman to serve as the head coach of a U.S. women's national swim team at the Olympics. She previously served as the head coach the U.S. women's national team for the 2010 Pan Pacific Swimming Championships.

In 2014, she was inducted into the American Swimming Coaches Association (ASCA) Hall of Fame.

== Allegations of bullying and release from Cal ==
On May 24, 2022, it was reported that McKeever was accused of the alleged bullying and emotional/verbal abuse of Cal swimmers dating back to 2014. According to media, "At least 26 people have alleged that Cal women's swimming head coach Teri McKeever has created a toxic culture rampant with severe verbal and emotional abuse that has led to significant mental and physical health ramifications for team members." The same day, the University of California, Berkeley released a statement confirming the allegations but their privacy policy prevented the University from commenting on the case. In January 2023, the University of California released McKeever after an eight month investigation by an independent law firm that revealed policy violations relating to discrimination by race, national origin, and disability, as well as instances of verbal abuse of student athletes. In a statement, McKeever denied the claims of discrimination and abuse made in the report and believed she was a victim of gender bias.

== Personal ==
McKeever married Jerry Romani in 2007, after they met at a California Golden Bears football game.

== See also ==
- California Golden Bears
- List of University of Southern California people
- USC Trojans
