= Zuzanna Mazurek =

Polish swimmer (born 1991)

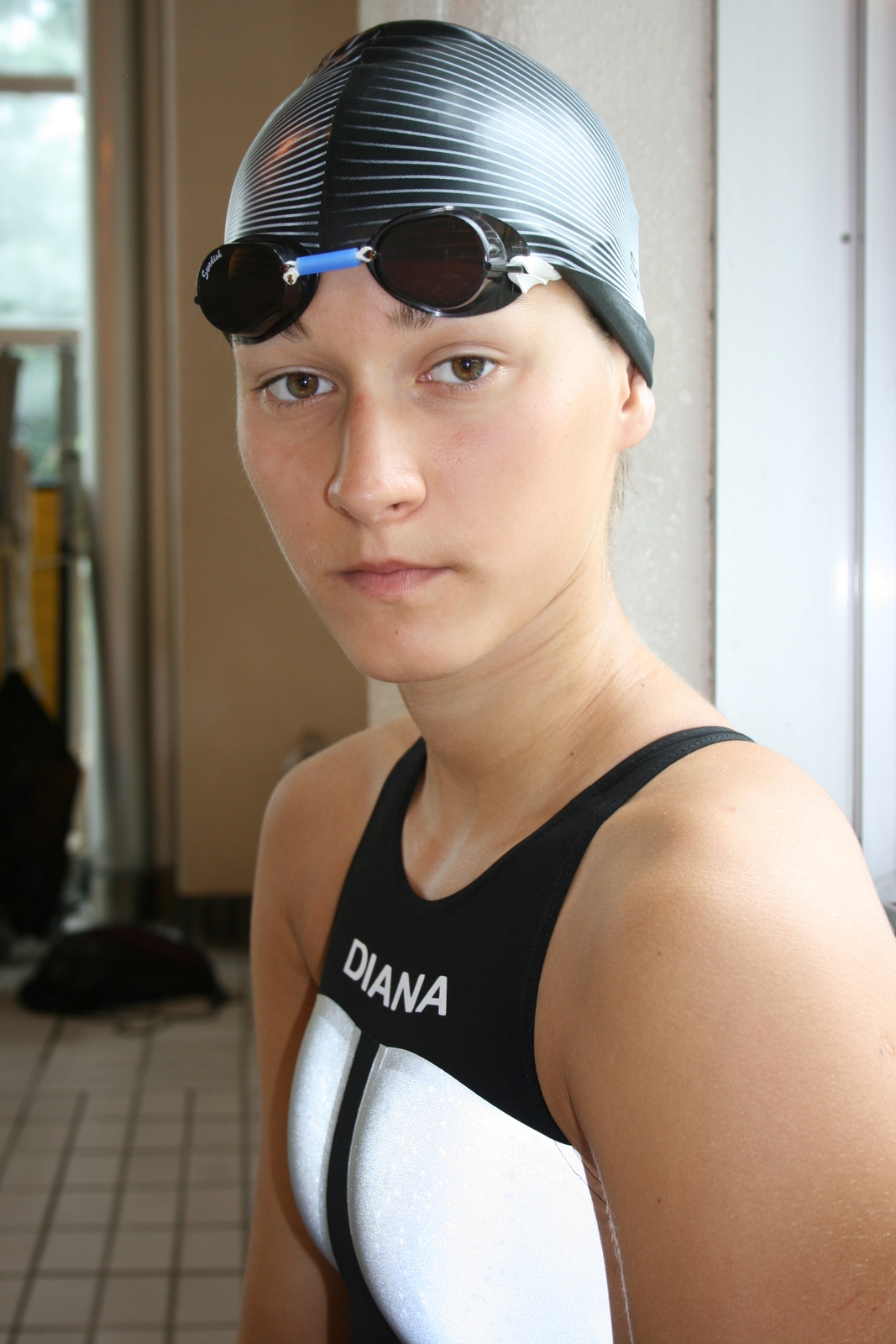

Personal information
- Full name: Zuzanna Mazurek
- National team: Poland
- Born: 15 May 1991 (age 35) Świdnik, Poland

Sport
- Sport: Swimming
- Strokes: Backstroke
- Club: UKP Fala Kraśnik
- Coach: Slawomir Pliszka
Medal record
Women's swimming
Representing Poland
World Junior Championships
Gold medal – first place	2008 Monterrey	200 m backstroke
European Junior Championships)
Bronze medal – third place	2007 Antwerp	200 m backstroke

Zuzanna Mazurek (born May 15, 1991, in Świdnik) is a Polish swimmer, who specialized in backstroke events. She represented her nation Poland, as a 17-year-old, at the 2008 Summer Olympics, and has claimed multiple Polish records in both 100 and 200 m backstroke, which were eventually broken by Alicja Tchorz in the succeeding decade. Mazurek also swam as a member of UKP Fala Kraśnik, under the tutelage of her coach Sławomir Pliszká.

Mazurek made her swimming history at the 2007 European Junior Championships in Antwerp, Belgium, claiming the bronze medal in the 200 m backstroke over her teammate Iwona Lefanowicz by 0.29 of a second with a time of 2:16.36. By the following year, she won a gold medal in the same discipline at the 2008 FINA Youth World Swimming Championships in Monterrey, Mexico, smashing a meet record in 2:12.56.

At the 2008 Summer Olympics in Beijing, Mazurek was selected to the Polish Olympic team in the pool, competing in a backstroke double. Four months before the Games, she threw down a scorching time of 2:12.65 (200 m backstroke) to shave 1.78 seconds off the national record (2:14.43) previously set by Aleksandra Miciul in 2000 and clear the insurmountable FINA A-cut (2:12.73) by 0.08 of a second at the Polish Championships in Ostrowiec. In the 100 m backstroke, Mazurek pulled away from the field to crush the Polish record in 1:02.77 for a victory over Guatemala's Gisela Morales in heat two by a 0.15-second margin, but finished farther from the semifinal field in thirty-sixth overall. In the 200 m backstroke, Mazurek could not produce a similar effort from the initial half of the backstroke double, as she lost in a sprint challenge to Ireland's Melanie Nocher for the top spot in heat two, but managed to finish with a new national record in 2:12.46. Mazurek missed the semifinals by nearly two seconds, as she placed twenty-first overall in the prelims.
