= 2006 Pan Pacific Swimming Championships – Women's 100 metre freestyle =

Women's 100 metre freestyle at the 2006 Pan Pacific Swimming Championships
- Venue: Saanich Commonwealth Place
- Dates: August 18, 2006 (heats & finals)
- Competitors: 47 from 10 nations
- Winning time: 53.87

Medalists
gold medal	Natalie Coughlin	United States
silver medal	Amanda Weir	United States
bronze medal	Melanie Schlanger	Australia

The women's 100 metre freestyle competition at the 2006 Pan Pacific Swimming Championships took place on August 18 at the Saanich Commonwealth Place. The last champion was Natalie Coughlin of US.

This race consisted of two lengths of the pool, both lengths being in freestyle.

== Records ==
Prior to this competition, the existing world and Pan Pacific records were as follows:

World record	Britta Steffen (GER)	53.30	Budapest, Hungary	August 2, 2006
Pan Pacific Championships record	Natalie Coughlin (USA)	53.99	Yokohama, Japan	August 29, 2002

== Results ==
All times are in minutes and seconds.

KEY:	q	Fastest non-qualifiers	Q	Qualified	CR	Championships record	NR	National record	PB	Personal best	SB	Seasonal best

=== Heats ===
The first round was held on August 18, at 10:00.

Rank	Heat	Lane	Name	Nationality	Time	Notes
1	5	4	Natalie Coughlin	United States	53.83	QA, CR
2	6	4	Amanda Weir	United States	54.23	QA
3	6	5	Kara Lynn Joyce	United States	54.97	QA
4	5	5	Melanie Schlanger	Australia	55.16	QA
5	4	4	Lacey Nymeyer	United States	55.19	QA
6	5	3	Whitney Myers	United States	55.34	QA
7	4	5	Shayne Reese	Australia	55.58	QA
8	5	2	Erica Morningstar	Canada	55.77	QA
9	4	2	Linda MacKenzie	Australia	55.90	QB
10	5	7	Victoria Poon	Canada	56.08	QB
11	5	1	Genevieve Saumur	Canada	56.16	QB
12	2	6	Hannah McLean	New Zealand	56.19	QB
13	6	1	Julia Wilkinson	Canada	56.27	QB
14	6	3	Courtney Cashion	United States	56.32	QB
15	4	3	Dana Vollmer	United States	56.40	QB
16	4	6	Kelly Stubbins	Australia	56.42	QB
17	6	7	Claudia Poll	Costa Rica	56.51	
18	4	1	Maki Mita	Japan	56.61	
19	3	3	Seanna Mitchell	Canada	56.63	
19	3	2	Kaori Yamada	Japan	56.63	
21	4	7	Norie Urabe	Japan	56.64	
22	3	6	Audrey Lacroix	Canada	56.69	
23	3	7	Lee Keo-Ra	South Korea	56.79	
24	2	4	Emily Wong	Canada	56.85	
25	3	5	Hannah Wilson	Hong Kong	56.88	
26	2	3	Leila Vaziri	United States	57.18	
27	6	2	Mary Descenza	United States	57.28	
28	1	5	Kim Dal-Eun	South Korea	57.32	
29	5	6	Lauren Boyle	New Zealand	57.43	
30	3	8	Maya Beaudry	Canada	57.51	
31	6	6	Alison Fitch	New Zealand	57.52	
32	4	8	Haruka Ueda	Japan	57.56	
33	6	8	Yang Chin-Kuei	Chinese Taipei	57.62	
34	1	4	Tsai Hiu-Wai	Hong Kong	57.68	
34	3	1	Nieh Pin-Chieh	Chinese Taipei	57.68	
36	1	3	Fran Adcock	Australia	57.85	
36	1	8	Karina Leane	Australia	57.85	
38	5	8	Kylie Palmer	Australia	57.91	
39	2	1	Michelle Engelsman	Australia	58.01	
40	3	4	Renata Burgos	Brazil	58.05	
41	2	5	Liz Coster	New Zealand	58.22	
42	2	2	Motomi Nakamura	Japan	58.31	
43	1	2	Lauren English	United States	58.83	
44	1	1	Kayla Rawlings	Canada	59.07	
45	1	6	Lee Leong Kwai	Hong Kong	59.42	
46	2	8	Sze Hang Yu	Hong Kong	59.47	
47	1	7	Sarah Paton	Australia	59.82	
-	2	7	Kate Ziegler	United States	DSQ	

=== B Final ===
The B final was held on August 18, at 18:00.

Rank	Lane	Name	Nationality	Time	Notes
9	4	Kara Lynn Joyce	United States	54.93	
10	5	Linda MacKenzie	Australia	55.94	
11	3	Genevieve Saumur	Canada	56.40	
12	6	Maki Mita	Japan	56.57	
13	1	Hannah Wilson	Hong Kong	56.69	
14	2	Kaori Yamada	Japan	56.76	
14	7	Lee Keo-Ra	South Korea	56.76	
16	8	Kim Dal-Eun	South Korea	57.45	

=== A Final ===
The A final was held on August 18, at 18:00.

Rank	Lane	Name	Nationality	Time	Notes
1st place, gold medalist(s)	4	Natalie Coughlin	United States	53.87	
2nd place, silver medalist(s)	5	Amanda Weir	United States	53.92	
3rd place, bronze medalist(s)	3	Melanie Schlanger	Australia	55.00	
4	6	Shayne Reese	Australia	55.33	
5	2	Erica Morningstar	Canada	55.36	
6	7	Victoria Poon	Canada	56.02	
7	1	Hannah McLean	New Zealand	56.38	
8	8	Claudia Poll	Costa Rica	56.84	
