= Nathalie Bernard =

New Zealand swimmer

Personal information
- Full name: Nathalie Bernard
- National team: New Zealand
- Born: 17 August 1985 (age 41) Johannesburg, South Africa
- Height: 1.69 m (5 ft 7 in)
- Weight: 56 kg (123 lb)

Sport
- Sport: Swimming
- Strokes: Freestyle
- Club: North Shore Swim Club (NZL)
- Coach: Thomas Ansorg (NZL)

Nathalie Bernard (born 17 August 1985) is a South African-born New Zealand former swimmer, who specialised in freestyle events. She is a single-time Olympian (2004), and a member of North Shore Swim Club in Auckland, under head coach Thomas Ansorg.

Bernard qualified for the women's 4 × 200 m freestyle relay, as a member of the New Zealand team, at the 2004 Summer Olympics in Athens. Teaming with Helen Norfolk, Alison Fitch, and Rebecca Linton in heat two, Bernard recorded a split of 2:07.00 to anchor the last 50 metres. She and the rest of the Kiwis finished the race in seventh place and thirteenth overall in a final time of 8:14.76.
