= Melissa Morgan (swimmer) =

Australian swimmer

Personal information
- Nicknames: Mel, melli, fish, missy
- National team: AUS
- Born: 1 January 1985 (age 41) Adelaide, Australia
- Height: 1.76 m (5 ft 9 in)
- Weight: 62 kg (137 lb)

Sport
- Sport: Swimming
- Strokes: Backstroke
- Club: Burnside Swimming Club
- Coach: Graeme Brown

Melissa Morgan (born 1 January 1985) is an Australian swimmer who specialized in backstroke events.

Morgan qualified for the women's 200-metre backstroke at the 2004 Summer Olympics in Athens, by attaining both her personal record and an A-standard entry time of 2:12.90 from the Telstra Olympic Swimming Trials in Sydney. Morgan secured her spot for the semifinals, after finishing twelfth overall in the morning's preliminary heats, outside her personal record of 2:14.06. On the evening session, Morgan edged out her teammate Frances Adcock in the second semifinal run with a much faster time of 2:13.34, but failed to qualify for the final.

She was a member of the Burnside Swimming Club, and was coached and trained by Graeme Brown.
