= Haley Cope =

American swimmer (born 1979)

Personal information
- Full name: Haley Cope
- National team: United States
- Born: April 11, 1979 (age 47) Chico, California, U.S.
- Height: 5 ft 10 in (178 cm)
- Weight: 139 lb (63 kg)

Sport
- Sport: Swimming
- Strokes: Backstroke
- College team: University of California, Berkeley
Medal record
Women's swimming
Representing the United States
Olympic Games
| Silver medal – second place | 2004 Athens | 4×100 m medley |
World Championships (LC)
| Gold medal – first place | 2001 Fukuoka | 50 m backstroke |
| Silver medal – second place | 2003 Barcelona | 4×100 m medley |
World Championships (SC)
| Gold medal – first place | 2002 Moscow | 100 m backstroke |
| Gold medal – first place | 2004 Indianapolis | 50 m backstroke |
| Gold medal – first place | 2004 Indianapolis | 100 m backstroke |
| Silver medal – second place | 2002 Moscow | 50 m backstroke |
| Silver medal – second place | 2002 Moscow | 4×100 m medley |
| Silver medal – second place | 2004 Indianapolis | 4×100 m medley |
Goodwill Games
| Gold medal – first place | 2001 Brisbane | 50 m backstroke |
| Bronze medal – third place | 2001 Brisbane | 4×100 m freestyle |
Pan Pacific Championships
| Bronze medal – third place | 2002 Yokohama | 100 m backstroke |

Haley Cope (born April 11, 1979), also known by her married name Haley Clark, is an American former competition swimmer, Olympic medalist, and former world record-holder. She won a silver medal at the 2004 Summer Olympics, eight world championship medals, and held a world record in the 50-meter backstroke.

== College career ==
Cope attended the University of California, Berkeley, where she swam for coach Teri McKeever's California Golden Bears swimming and diving team from 1998 to 2001. In 2000, she was named the Pacific-10 Conference swimmer of the year, and helped lead California to a fourth-place finish nationally. At the 2000 NCAA national championships in Indianapolis, she swam the 50-meter backstroke in 27.25 seconds, breaking Sandra Völker's short-course world record. She graduated in 2001 with a bachelor's degree in mass communications. In 2001, she won a gold medal in the 50-meter backstroke at the World Aquatics Championship, and two medals at the final Goodwill Games. Her 50-meter backstroke performance at the Goodwill Games was a record time for the competition.

== Olympics, World and Short Course World Championships ==
After graduating from Berkeley, Cope continued her swimming career, winning her second short course worlds title at the 2002 Short Course World Swimming Championships held in Moscow. She won gold medal in the 100 backstroke, and two silver medals in the 50 backstroke, and the 4×100-meter medley relay, in which she swam the backstroke leg. In 2003, she swam at her second long course World Championships in Barcelona, where she won a silver medal in the 4×100-meter medley relay.

At the 2004 Summer Olympics, held in Athens, Greece, Cope swam the backstroke in the preliminary heat of the women's 4×100-meter medley relay. In the finals, the American team took second place, and Cope was awarded a silver medal.

Cope's last major international competition was in October 2004, at the 2004 Short Course World Swimming Championships in Indianapolis. In Indianapolis, she repeated as champion in the 100-meter backstroke, as well as winning the 50 backstroke. As part of the American team, she won a silver medal in the 4×100-meter medley relay.

== Personal life ==
Cope married her former coach, Brian Clark, in 2002, and has four children. She is currently operating a swimming school in Chico called Water Sprites Swim School. She posed nude for the September 2004 issue of Playboy magazine.

== See also ==
- List of Olympic medalists in swimming (women)
- List of University of California, Berkeley alumni
- List of World Aquatics Championships medalists in swimming (women)
- World record progression 50 metres backstroke

Records
| Preceded by Sandra Völker | Women's 50-meter backstroke world record-holder (short course); March 18, 2000 – December 2, 2001 | Succeeded by Li Hui |
