= Natalie Coughlin =

American swimmer (born 1982)

Natalie Coughlin Hall
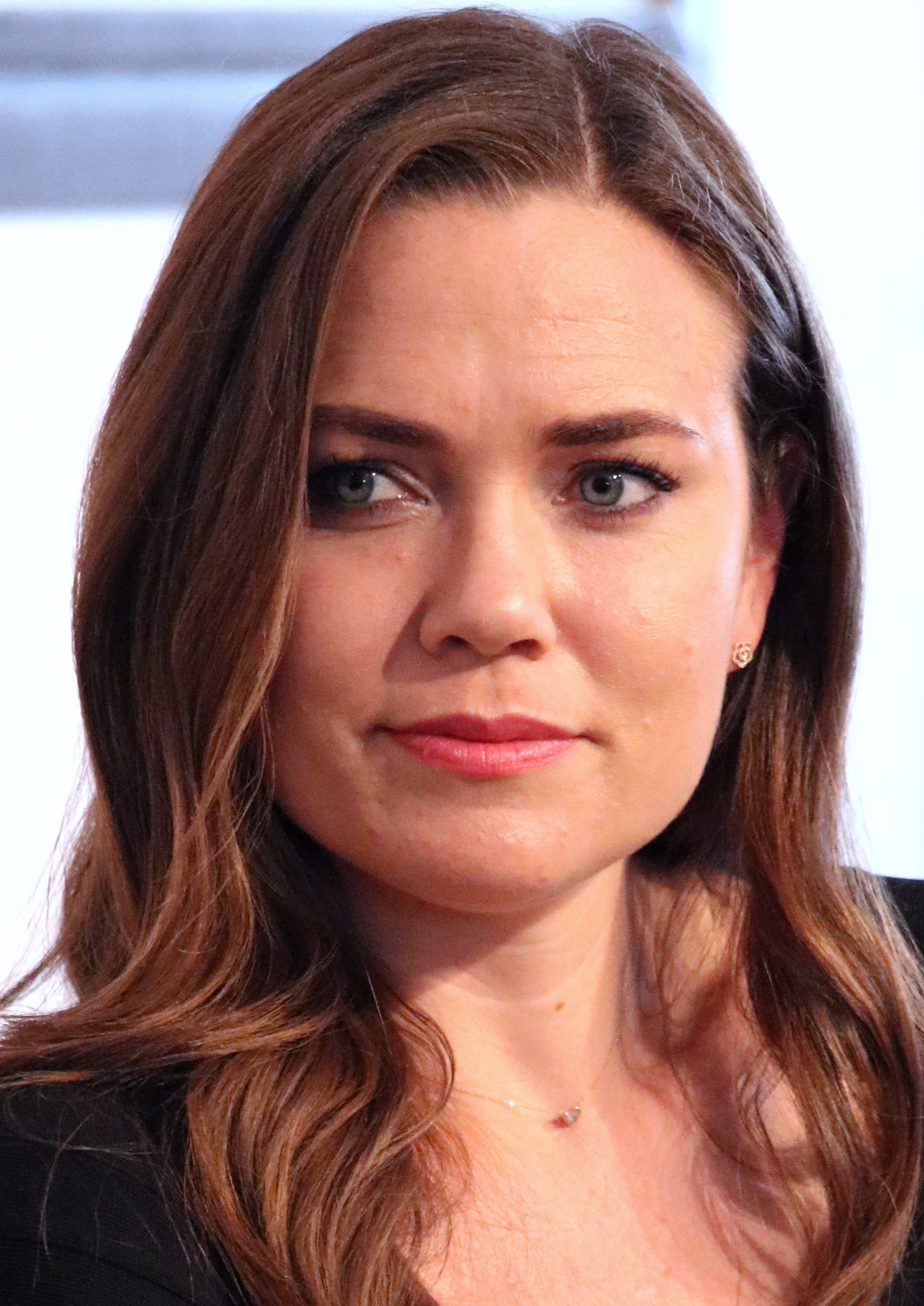
- Coughlin in 2018

Personal information
- Full name: Natalie Anne Coughlin Hall
- Nickname: Nat
- National team: United States
- Born: Natalie Anne Coughlin; August 23, 1982 (age 43) Vallejo, California, U.S.
- Height: 5 ft 8 in (1.73 m)
- Weight: 139 lb (63 kg)
- Spouse: Ethan Hall (2009–present)
- Website: NatalieCoughlin.com

Sport
- Sport: Swimming
- Strokes: Backstroke, butterfly, freestyle, individual medley
- Club: California Aquatics
- College team: University of California, Berkeley
- Coach: Teri McKeever (Cal Berkeley)
Medal record
Women's swimming
Representing United States
International aquatics competitions
Event	1st	2nd	3rd
Summer Olympics	3	4	5
World Championships (LC)	7	7	5
World Championships (SC)	2	5	1
Pan Pacific Championships	11	4	1
Pan American Games	1	2	1
Total	24	22	13
Summer Olympics
Gold medal – first place	2004 Athens	100 m backstroke
Gold medal – first place	2004 Athens	4×200 m freestyle
Gold medal – first place	2008 Beijing	100 m backstroke
Silver medal – second place	2004 Athens	4×100 m freestyle
Silver medal – second place	2004 Athens	4×100 m medley
Silver medal – second place	2008 Beijing	4×100 m freestyle
Silver medal – second place	2008 Beijing	4×100 m medley
Bronze medal – third place	2004 Athens	100 m freestyle
Bronze medal – third place	2008 Beijing	100 m freestyle
Bronze medal – third place	2008 Beijing	200 m medley
Bronze medal – third place	2008 Beijing	4×200 m freestyle
Bronze medal – third place	2012 London	4×100 m freestyle
World Championships (LC)
Gold medal – first place	2001 Fukuoka	100 m backstroke
Gold medal – first place	2003 Barcelona	4×100 m freestyle
Gold medal – first place	2005 Montreal	4×200 m freestyle
Gold medal – first place	2007 Melbourne	100 m backstroke
Gold medal – first place	2007 Melbourne	4×200 m freestyle
Gold medal – first place	2011 Shanghai	4×100 m medley
Gold medal – first place	2013 Barcelona	4×100 m freestyle
Silver medal – second place	2001 Fukuoka	4×100 m medley
Silver medal – second place	2003 Barcelona	4×100 m medley
Silver medal – second place	2005 Montreal	4×100 m medley
Silver medal – second place	2005 Montreal	100 m freestyle
Silver medal – second place	2007 Melbourne	4×100 m freestyle
Silver medal – second place	2007 Melbourne	4×100 m medley
Silver medal – second place	2011 Shanghai	4×100 m freestyle
Bronze medal – third place	2001 Fukuoka	50 m backstroke
Bronze medal – third place	2005 Montreal	100 m backstroke
Bronze medal – third place	2005 Montreal	4×100 m freestyle
Bronze medal – third place	2007 Melbourne	100 m butterfly
Bronze medal – third place	2011 Shanghai	100 m backstroke
World Championships (SC)
Gold medal – first place	2010 Dubai	100 m backstroke
Gold medal – first place	2014 Doha	4×50 m mixed free
Silver medal – second place	2010 Dubai	4×100 m freestyle
Silver medal – second place	2010 Dubai	4×100 m medley
Silver medal – second place	2014 Doha	4×50 m freestyle
Silver medal – second place	2014 Doha	4×100 m freestyle
Silver medal – second place	2014 Doha	4×50 m medley
Bronze medal – third place	2010 Dubai	100 m freestyle
Pan Pacific Championships
Gold medal – first place	2002 Yokohama	100 m freestyle
Gold medal – first place	2002 Yokohama	100 m backstroke
Gold medal – first place	2002 Yokohama	100 m butterfly
Gold medal – first place	2002 Yokohama	4×200 m freestyle
Gold medal – first place	2006 Victoria	100 m freestyle
Gold medal – first place	2006 Victoria	4×100 m freestyle
Gold medal – first place	2006 Victoria	4×200 m freestyle
Gold medal – first place	2006 Victoria	4×100 m medley
Gold medal – first place	2010 Irvine	100 m freestyle
Gold medal – first place	2010 Irvine	4×100 m freestyle
Gold medal – first place	2010 Irvine	4×100 m medley
Silver medal – second place	2002 Yokohama	4×100 m freestyle
Silver medal – second place	2002 Yokohama	4×100 m medley
Silver medal – second place	2006 Victoria	50 m freestyle
Silver medal – second place	2006 Victoria	100 m backstroke
Bronze medal – third place	2010 Irvine	100 m backstroke
Pan American Games
Gold medal – first place	2015 Toronto	4×100 m medley
Silver medal – second place	2015 Toronto	100 m freestyle
Silver medal – second place	2015 Toronto	4×100 m freestyle
Bronze medal – third place	2015 Toronto	50 m freestyle

Natalie Anne Coughlin Hall (born August 23, 1982) is an American former competition swimmer and twelve-time Olympic medalist. While attending the University of California, Berkeley, she became the first woman ever to swim the 100-meter backstroke (long course) in less than one minute. At the 2008 Summer Olympics, she became the first U.S. female athlete in modern Olympic history to win six medals in one Olympiad, and the first woman ever to win a 100-meter backstroke gold in two consecutive Olympics. At the 2012 Summer Olympics, in her third and final Olympic appearance, she earned a bronze medal in the 4×100-meter freestyle relay.

Coughlin's success has earned her the World Swimmer of the Year Award once and American Swimmer of the Year Award three times. She has won a total of 59 medals in major international competition, twenty-five gold, twenty-two silver, and thirteen bronze spanning the Olympics, the World, the Pan Pacific Championships, and the Pan American Games.

== Early years ==
Coughlin was born in Vallejo, California, the daughter of Jim and Zennie Coughlin. She is of Irish and one quarter Filipino ancestry. Coughlin first began swimming at Vallejo Aquatics Club when she was 8 years old, where she was coached by Tuffy Williams. She attended St. Catherine of Siena School in Vallejo, for kindergarten through eighth grade, and then Carondelet High School in Concord, California. While in high school in 1998, she became the first swimmer to qualify for the Summer National in all fourteen events. Coughlin broke two individual national high school records in the 200-yard individual medley (1:58.45) and the 100-yard backstroke (52.86). She graduated from Carondelet High School in 2000.

== College career ==
Coughlin attended the University of California, Berkeley, where she swam for coach Teri McKeever's California Golden Bears swimming and diving team in National Collegiate Athletic Association (NCAA) competition from 2001 to 2004. During her four years as a Cal Bears swimmer, she won eleven individual NCAA national championships, and a twelfth NCAA relay title. She was recognized as the NCAA Swimmer of the Year for three consecutive years, and she was a two-time recipient of the Honda Sports Award for Swimming and Diving, recognizing her as the outstanding college female swimmer in 2001–02 and 2002–03. Sports Illustrated magazine named her its college Female Athlete of the Year. Coughlin was inducted into the Cal Athletic Hall of Fame in 2014. Coughlin graduated from Berkeley with a degree in psychology in the spring of 2005.

== International career ==
=== 2001–2003 ===
At the ninth World Aquatics Championships in Fukuoka, Japan, Coughlin won three medals—one gold, one silver, and one bronze. She won her gold medal in the 100-meter backstroke with Diana Mocanu (Romania) taking the silver and Antje Buschschulte (Germany) taking the bronze. Coughlin won her silver medal in the women's 4×100-meter medley relay, teaming up with Megan Quann, Mary Descenza, and Erin Phenix; the Australians won the gold (Calub, Jones, Thomas, Ryan). Coughlin won her bronze medal in the 50-meter backstroke; fellow American Haley Cope won gold and Antje Buschschulte won the silver.

At the ninth Pan Pacific Championships in Yokohama, Japan, Coughlin won six medals—four golds and two silvers. Coughlin won one of her gold medals in the women's 100-meter backstroke with a time of 59.72, and another in the women's 100-meter butterfly with a time of 57.88. Coughlin won her third gold medal in the women's 100-meter freestyle with a time of 53.99. She won her fourth gold medal in the women's 4×200-meter freestyle relay with Elizabeth Hill, Diana Munz, and Lindsay Benko. She won her silver medals as a member of the second-place U.S. relay teams in the 4×100-meter freestyle and 4×100-meter medley events.

At the tenth World Aquatics Championships in Barcelona, Spain, Coughlin won two medals, including a gold and a silver. Coughlin won her gold medal in the women's 4×100-meter freestyle relay and a silver medal in the 4×100-medley relay.

=== 2004 Athens Summer Olympics ===
2004 Olympics
Gold medal – first place	2004 Athens	100 m backstroke
Gold medal – first place	2004 Athens	4x200 m freestyle relay
Silver medal – second place	2004 Athens	4x100 m freestyle relay
Silver medal – second place	2004 Athens	4x100 m medley relay
Bronze medal – third place	2004 Athens	100 m freestyle

Coughlin won the gold medal at the 2004 Olympics in the women's 100-meter backstroke event and won a silver medal as a member of the U.S. women's 4×100-meter freestyle relay team with Kara Lynn Joyce, Amanda Weir and Jenny Thompson. She also broke a world record and won gold as a member of the 4×200-meter freestyle relay, a silver in the 4×100-meter medley relay, and a bronze in the 100-meter freestyle.

=== 2005–2006 ===
At the eleventh World Aquatics Championships in Montreal, Quebec, Coughlin won five medals, including a gold and 2 silvers and 2 bronzes. Coughlin won a gold medal in the women's 200 m freestyle relay and silver medals in the 100 meter medley relay and the 100 m freestyle. She also won bronze medals in the 100 m backstroke and the 100m freestyle relay.

Coughlin worked as an in-studio host for MSNBC during the 2006 Winter Olympics in Turin, Italy.

=== 2007 World Aquatics Championships ===
At the 2007 World Aquatics Championships, Coughlin won five medals: two gold, two silver, and one bronze. In her first event, the 4×100-meter freestyle relay, Coughlin won a silver medal along with Lacey Nymeyer, Amanda Weir, and Kara Lynn Joyce. The following day, in the 100-meter butterfly, she placed third in the final with a time of 57.34, an American record. In the 100-meter backstroke final, held the following day, she broke her own world record set in 2002 with a time of 59.44. After a day of rest, Coughlin was back in the pool to swim the lead-off leg in the 4×200-meter freestyle relay. Swimming in lane eight, Coughlin set the American record with a time of 1:56.43, to break Katie Hoff's one-day-old record of 1:57.09. Dana Vollmer, Lacey Nymeyer, and Katie Hoff each extended the lead and the final time of 7:50.09 was a world record. The following day, Coughlin finished in 4th place in the 100-meter freestyle despite setting the championship record in the semi-finals. In her last event, the 4×100-meter medley relay, Coughlin won a silver medal along with Tara Kirk, Rachel Komisarz, and Lacey Nymeyer.

=== 2008 Beijing Summer Olympics ===
2008 Olympics
Gold medal – first place	2008 Beijing	100 m backstroke
Silver medal – second place	2008 Beijing	4x100 m freestyle relay
Silver medal – second place	2008 Beijing	4x100 m medley relay
Bronze medal – third place	2008 Beijing	100 m freestyle
Bronze medal – third place	2008 Beijing	200 m IM
Bronze medal – third place	2008 Beijing	4x200 m freestyle relay

In Coughlin's second Olympics appearance, at Beijing in 2008, she became the first American female athlete to win six medals in one Olympics. She was elected joint captain of the US women's swimming team together with five-time Olympian Dara Torres and four-time Olympian Amanda Beard. Coughlin won the gold medal in the 100-meter backstroke at those Olympiads, the inaugural woman to successfully defend a gold medal standing in that event. Her world record was surpassed in the semi-final by Kirsty Coventry, who would take the silver behind Coughlin in the final. Standing on the medal platform, her lip was still bleeding having bitten it during the race to distract her from the pain in her legs. She won a silver medal in the 4×100-meter freestyle relay, swimming with Lacey Nymeyer, Kara Lynn Joyce and Dara Torres, and also won bronze medals in the 200-meter individual medley, 4×200-meter freestyle relay, and the 100-meter freestyle. She won a silver medal in her final race in the 4×100-meter medley relay swimming with Rebecca Soni, Christine Magnuson, and Dara Torres.

=== 2010 US Summer Nationals and Pan Pacific Championships ===
After taking an 18-month hiatus from swimming, Coughlin returned to competition at the 2010 Conoco Phillips Summer Nationals. Coughlin qualified for Pan Pacific in the 100-meter backstroke with a time of 1:00.14.

Before racing at the Pan Pacs, Coughlin, along with Amanda Beard, was elected co-captain of Team USA once again. In the finals of the 100-meter freestyle, Natalie Coughlin won the gold, making a new Pan Pacific record (53.67). In the finals of the 100-meter backstroke, Coughlin finished third (59.70) behind Australia's Emily Seebohm and Japan's Aya Terakawa. Coughlin won two more golds when starting off both the 4×100-meter freestyle relay and the 4×100-meter medley relay.

=== 2011 World Aquatics Championships ===
At the 14th World Aquatics Championships in Shanghai, China, Coughlin won three medals–one gold, one silver, and one bronze. She won a gold medal in the women's 4×100-meter medley relay with fellow Americans Rebecca Soni, Dana Vollmer, and Missy Franklin with a time of 3:52.36. She won a silver medal in the women's 4×100-meter freestyle relay with fellow Americans Missy Franklin, Jessica Hardy, and Dana Vollmer with a time of 3:34.47 with the Netherlands touching first with a time of 3:33.96. She won a bronze medal in the women's 100-meter backstroke, her only individual medal at these championships, with a 59.15. Coughlin led for the entire race, when in the last couple meters, Zhao Jing and Anastasia Zueva edged her out.

=== 2012 London Summer Olympics ===
At the 2012 United States Olympic Trials in Omaha, Nebraska, the U.S. qualifying event for the Olympics, the 29-year-old veteran Coughlin found herself in competition with a younger generation of American swimmers. In order to qualify for the U.S. team in a given individual event, swimmers are required to finish among the top two. In the finals of the 100-meter backstroke, she finished third behind teenagers Missy Franklin and Rachel Bootsma, and finished seventh in the 100-meter butterfly. Coughlin also competed in the 100-meter freestyle, and finished sixth, qualifying to compete as a member of the U.S. women's team in the preliminaries of the 4×100-meter freestyle relay.

At the 2012 Summer Olympics in London, she swam in the qualifying round of the 4×100-meter freestyle relay, and did not swim in the 4×100-meter final, but earned a bronze medal when the U.S. team placed third in the final. It was her twelfth Olympic medal, tying the record previously set by American swimmers Jenny Thompson and Dara Torres for the most career Olympic medals won by a female U.S. athlete. This record has since been surpassed by Katie Ledecky.

=== 2013 World Aquatics Championships ===
At the 2013 Phillips 66 National Championships, which also served as the selection meet for the World Championships, Coughlin decided to only take up the sprint freestyles and swam the 50 and 100-meter freestyle events. Coughlin qualified for the 50-meter freestyle and the 4×100-meter freestyle relay. Coughlin finished first in the 50-meter freestyle with a 24.97, just ahead of 16-year-old Simone Manuel, who swam a 25.01. With the first-place finish in the 50-meter freestyle, Coughlin ensured herself a relay spot since she had finished 5th in the 100-meter freestyle, with a time of 54.04.

She won a gold medal at the event on the first night of swimming competition in the 4×100 freestyle relay. She went second for team USA and swam her leg in 52.98 seconds; she was one of 6 women in the field of 32 to break the 53-second barrier.

In her final triumph, two months before her 33rd birthday in 2015, she set an American record of 27.51 seconds in the 50-meter backstroke.

== Post-swimming career and media appearances ==
Coughlin was the spokeswoman for C20 Coconut Water.

One of Coughlin's favorite hobbies is cooking. During the 2008 Summer Olympics, she was invited to prepare a Chinese-themed dish on Today. She has appeared as a judge on Iron Chef America. She appeared on Food Network's Chopped Sport Stars episode that first aired on September 3, 2013.

Coughlin competed in season 9 of Dancing with the Stars with season 1 professional champion, Alec Mazo. She was eliminated on the fifth episode.

Coughlin appeared in the 2012 Sports Illustrated Swimsuit Issue. She has also written a book called Golden Girl.

In 2013, Coughlin appeared in Chopped where she lost in the final round to Danica Patrick. While on the show she mentioned she grows a vegetable and herb garden in her backyard, as well as raising backyard chickens.

Coughlin appeared on one of the covers for the 2015 ESPN The Magazine The Body Issue and in July/August 2016, the cover of Self's Olympics themed issue.

Also in 2015, Coughlin became a brand ambassador and investor in a frozen food company, Luvo Inc.

In 2017, she became a partner in Gaderian Wines, a winemaking operation in Napa Valley.

In 2021, Coughlin was inducted into the Bay Area Sports Hall of Fame.

In 2023, Coughlin was elected vice-chair and chair-elect for the board of directors of USA Swimming. She will be vice-chair until 2025 and then serve a four-year term as board chair until 2029.

== Personal life ==
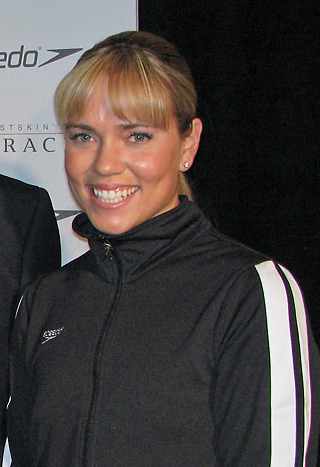
Coughlin in 2008

In April 2009, Coughlin married Ethan Hall, the Crow Canyon Sharks swim coach. They have a daughter born in 2018, and a son, born in 2020.

== Personal bests ==
=== Long course (50 m pool) ===
Event	Time	Venue	Date	Notes
50 m backstroke	27.51	Santa Clara	June 19, 2015	Former NR
100 m backstroke	58.94 (r)	Beijing	August 17, 2008	
200 m backstroke	2:08.53	Fort Lauderdale	August 16, 2002	
50 m butterfly	26.50	Montreal	July 29, 2005	
100 m butterfly	57.34	Melbourne	March 26, 2007	
50 m freestyle	24.66	Toronto	July 17, 2015	
100 m freestyle	53.39	Beijing	August 15, 2008	
200 m freestyle	1:56.43 (r)	Melbourne	March 29, 2007	
200 m individual medley	2:09.77	Los Angeles	June 6, 2008	

=== Short course (25 m pool) ===
Event	Time	Venue	Date	Notes
50 m backstroke	27.08	East Meadow	November 22, 2002	NR
100 m backstroke	55.97 (r)	Atlanta	December 16, 2011	AM, NR
200 m backstroke	2:03.62	East Meadow	November 27, 2001	
50 m butterfly	25.83	East Meadow	n/a	
100 m butterfly ^{[a]}	56.23	Atlanta	December 16, 2011	
50 m freestyle	24.31	Atlanta	December 17, 2011	
100 m freestyle	51.88 (r)	Dubai	December 18, 2010	AM, NR
100 m individual medley	58.55	Viareggio	November 15, 2014	AM, NR

^{a} ^{b} United States open record

== See also ==
- List of multiple Olympic gold medalists
- List of multiple Olympic medalists
- List of multiple Summer Olympic medalists
- List of multiple Olympic medalists at a single Games
- List of Olympic medalists in swimming (women)
- List of United States records in swimming
- List of World Aquatics Championships medalists in swimming (women)
- List of world records in swimming
- World record progression 100 metres backstroke
- World record progression 100 metres butterfly
- World record progression 100 metres individual medley
- World record progression 200 metres backstroke
- World record progression 4 × 100 metres medley relay
- World record progression 4 × 200 metres freestyle relay

Records
Preceded by He Cihong; Hayley McGregory	Women's 100-meter backstroke world record-holder (long course); August 13, 2002 – June 30, 2008; June 30, 2008 – August 11, 2008	Succeeded by Hayley McGregory; Kirsty Coventry
Preceded by Reiko Nakamura	Women's 100-meter backstroke world record-holder (short course); November 29, 2001 – February 22, 2009	Succeeded by Shiho Sakai
Preceded by Sara Price	Women's 200-meter backstroke world record-holder (short course); November 27, 2001 – February 23, 2008	Succeeded by Reiko Nakamura
Preceded by Martina Moravcová	Women's 100-meter butterfly world record-holder (short course); November 22, 2002 – August 28, 2006	Succeeded by Libby Trickett
Preceded by Jenny Thompson	Women's 100-meter individual medley world record-holder (short course); November 23, 2002 – August 10, 2009	Succeeded by Emily Seebohm
Awards
Preceded by Inge de Bruijn	Swimming World; World Swimmer of the Year; 2002	Succeeded by Hannah Stockbauer
Preceded by Brooke Bennett; Katie Hoff	Swimming World; American Swimmer of the Year; 2001 & 2002; 2008	Succeeded by Amanda Beard; Ariana Kukors & Rebecca Soni
