= Lee Da-hye (swimmer) =

South Korean swimmer (born 1987)

Personal information
- Full name: Lee Da-hye
- National team: South Korea
- Born: 5 April 1987 (age 39) Seoul, South Korea
- Height: 1.70 m (5 ft 7 in)
- Weight: 52 kg (115 lb)

Sport
- Sport: Swimming
- Strokes: Backstroke

Lee Da-hye (Korean: 이다혜; born April 5, 1987) is a South Korean swimmer, who specialized in backstroke events. Lee qualified for the women's 200 m backstroke at the 2004 Summer Olympics in Athens, by clearing a FINA B-standard entry time of 2:14.88 from the Dong-A Swimming Tournament in Seoul. She challenged seven other swimmers in heat two, including top medal favorite Evelyn Verrasztó of Hungary. She edged out Guatemala's Gisela Morales to claim a fifth spot by half a second in 2:17.73. Lee failed to advance into the semifinals, as she placed twenty-fifth overall in the preliminaries.
