= St. Catherine of Siena School (Vallejo, California) =

Location
- 3460 Tennessee Street; Vallejo, California 94591; United States; 38°6′36″N 122°12′16″W

Information
- Type: Private, Co-ed
- Established: 1985
- School district: Diocese of Sacramento
- Principal: Hydie Hess
- Staff: 13
- Faculty: 19
- Grades: K–8
- Enrollment: 307
- Colors: Red, White and Gray
- Team name: SC Stars
- Affiliation: Roman Catholic
- Pastor: Rev. Fr. Glenn Jaron
- Admission: Advanced Placement
- Website: https://www.scsvallejo.org

St. Catherine of Siena School in Vallejo, California is a Catholic school in the Diocese of Sacramento. The school has nine classes: kindergarten to junior high school. Although St Catherine is a private Catholic school, it accepts applications for all students regardless of parish or religious affiliations. Its kindergarten is full day for entire school year. The school also offers pre-kindergarten and after school programs.

== Courses ==
St. Catherine of Siena School curriculum is aligned with standards of both Diocese of Sacramento and the State of California. It offers Mathematics, Science, Language Arts, Social Studies, International Language, Music, Computer Technology and Religion. As specials it offers Advanced Mathematics, Art and Physical Education. The school is accredited by the Western Association of Schools and Colleges and a member of the Western Catholic Educational Association.

== Technology Teaching ==
The faculty at St. Catherine of Siena School uses new technology to support the School-wide Learning Expectations and the school's Mission. Through such electronic resources as a state-of-the-art computer lab, desktop, notebook computers in the classrooms, a portable netbook lab in the primary grades, and a portable iPad lab in the junior high, our student engage in various learning experiences. These include educational programs, Internet-based research, writing, and the creation of various kinds of presentations using Canva and Google Slides.

Additionally, teachers use new technology, including Smart Boards, LCD projectors, electronic microscopes, and LCD televisions, to create innovative lessons. St. Catherine teachers also utilize two computer based reading comprehension and assessment programs - Scholastic Reading Counts and Scholastic Reading Inventory, to encourage reading development in grades one through eight.

== Extracurricular activities ==
St. Catherine of Siena School offers opportunities in non-sports activities. These activities include Choir 5th-8th, Student Council 6th-8th, Student Ambassadors 6-8th, Safety Patrol 6th-8th, Religious Education student assistants 8th, Altar Servers 3rd-8th, Academic Decathlon 6th- 8th, readers for mass 2nd-8th, gift bearers 2nd-8th, and cross bearer ministers junior high. In addition, since 2005 the school has sent a team from the 5th and 6th grades to compete in the Diocesan Religion Decathlon.

The school fields Grades 5-8 basketball teams for both boys and girls, volleyball teams for girls (also for Grades 5–8) a volleyball team for boys (Grades 5-8 and flag football (Grades 5–8). All these teams compete against the other Catholic schools in the Solano-Pittsburg Athletic League (SPAL).
