= Karen Lee (swimmer) =

English swimmer (born 1983)

Personal information
- Full name: Karen Barbara Lee
- National team: Great Britain
- Born: 1 January 1983 (age 43) Bristol, England
- Height: 1.74 m (5 ft 9 in)
- Weight: 64 kg (141 lb; 10.1 st)

Sport
- Sport: Swimming
- Strokes: Backstroke
- College team: Loughborough University
- Coach: Ben Titley

Karen Barbara Lee (born 1 January 1983) is an English former competitive swimmer who represented Great Britain in the Olympics and European championships. She specialized in backstroke events. She finished sixth in the 200-metre backstroke (2.10.27) at the 2002 European Short Course Swimming Championships in Riesa, Germany. She was also a member of Team GB starting in 1998, and a varsity swimmer for the Loughborough University team, under head coach Ben Titley.

Lee qualified for the women's 200-metre backstroke, as a member of Team GB, at the 2004 Summer Olympics in Athens. She finished second behind Katy Sexton (2:11.48) at the British Olympic Trials by 0.38 of a second, in a FINA A-standard of 2:11.86. She challenged seven other swimmers in heat four, including Germany's Antje Buschschulte and Russia's Stanislava Komarova, both of whom were top medal favorites. She faded to seventh place by a 5.39-second margin behind winner Komarova in 2:16.10. Lee missed the semifinals by nearly one second, as she placed twentieth overall in the preliminaries.
