= Amanda Adkins (swimmer) =

American swimmer (born 1976)

Personal information
- Full name: Amanda Jo Adkins
- National team: United States
- Born: December 5, 1976 (age 49) Peoria, Illinois, U.S.
- Height: 5 ft 8 in (1.73 m)
- Weight: 134 lb (61 kg)
- Spouse: Brad Schneider

Sport
- Sport: Swimming
- Strokes: Backstroke
- Club: Greater Columbus Swim Team (Gahanna, Ohio); Athens Bulldogs
- College team: University of Georgia; 1995-1999

Amanda Jo Adkins (born December 5, 1976), later known by her married name Amanda Schneider, is an American former competition swimmer, an Ohio State Champion in the 100-meter backstroke, and a 2000 Atlanta Olympic competitor in the 200-meter backstroke. She swam for the SEC Championship University of Georgia swim team from 1995-1999.

== High School swimming highlights ==
Amanda was born in Peoria, Illinois on December 5, 1976. She swam for Lincoln High School in Gahanna, Ohio, taking a 57.92.2 in the 100-yard backstroke in February, 1993, at the State Qualifiers in Canton, Ohio, finishing first in the event and qualifying for the Ohio State Championship. She also competed in the 200 Individual Medley, taking a fifth place.

=== State championships ===
In February, 1994, swimming for Lincoln High School, in Gahanna, Ohio, she was an Ohio State High School Champion, placing first in her signature event at the State Meet in Canton, Ohio, with a 57.45 in the 100-yard backstroke. In February, 1995, she repeated as State Champion in the 100-yard backstroke, taking first with a 57.10.

== Collegiate era swimming ==
She swam in college at Athen's University of Georgia under Head Women's Coach Jack Bauerle, specializing in the 100 and 200 backstroke, beginning around the fall of 1995 through May 2000, when she graduated. Amanda was an NCAA Academic All-American, and a 13-time NCAA All-American. During her years at Georgia, the team took the Southeastern Conference Championships in 1997-1999, and more significantly an NCAA championship in 1999. During her tenure at Georgia, Head coach Jack Bauerle was named SEC Women's Coach of the Year. Amanda contributed to their victory and captained the NCAA championship University of Georgia team in 1999.

=== '96 Olympic Trials ===
At the March, 1996 Olympic trials in Indianapolis, she placed third in her heat in the 200-meter backstroke with a time of 2:13.41, just a little over a second behind her 2000 Olympic final time. Her time was good enough to make her a 1996 Olympic team alternate.

==== National Outdoor 200-meter back champion ====
Amanda was US Champion in the 200-meter back in 1997. Winning the event, she swam a 2:12.62 on September 30, 1997 at the Philips66 National Outdoor Swimming Championships in the 200-meter backstroke swimming for the Greater Columbus Swim Team of Ohio to qualify for the 1998 World Championships in Australia.

In January 1997, she set a time of 2:03.47 in the 200-yard back competing for the University of Georgia in a dual meet with the University of Kentucky at Athens, Georgia, in January 1997.

=== International competition ===
She competed at the 1997 Pan Pacific Championships in Fukuoka, Japan, the World Championships in Perth, Australia in 1998, and the World University Games in Mallorca, Spain in 1999. In one of her better showings, she placed 4th in the 200-meter back at the finals of the 1999 World University games with a 2:15.45.

== 2000 Sydney Olympics ==
Demonstrating the effectiveness of her training and justifying her high National rating in the event, Adkins won the finals of the 200-meter backstroke at the 2000 American Olympic Trials in Indianapolis on August 15, 2000 with a time of 2:12.97.2. Her time made her one of only two qualifiers for the event, along with Lindsay Benko, who would later receive the Olympic gold medal in the 4x200-meter freestyle relay at Sydney.

At one of the pinnacles of her swimming career, she was honored to represent the U.S. Team at the Olympics in Sydney, Australia, in the women's 200-meter backstroke, and was pleased to advance to the event finals. She said she "gave it everything I had", but was somewhat disappointed to finish fifth overall in the finals with a time of 2:12.35, though it bettered her first-place American Olympic trial time. She finished only four seconds short of gold medalist Diana Mocanu of Romania.

== Coaching at Denison U. ==
Within a few years of graduating from the University of Georgia in May 2000, she married her husband Brad Schneider. In 2009 she was working as an Assistant Swimming Coach at Denison University while living in Granville, Ohio, and was still working at the position part-time in 2016. Denison was within 25 miles of Lincoln High School in Gahanna, Ohio where she graduated. She also has coached a USA swimming youth age group club, now known as Pau Hana Swim Team, with an Olympic size pool at the large Trumbull Aquatic Center at Denison, where for a period she specialized in children under 8. She and Brad had had two children by 2009.

She did far less swimming into later years, preferring running and completed a few marathons. In 2016, however, she trained for, registered and completed the Mighty Mac Swim, a 4.2 mile Open Water course across the Straits of Mackinac in Michigan, somewhat near the site of the Mackinac Bridge.

== See also ==
- List of University of Georgia people
