= Michelle Lischinsky =

Canadian swimmer (born 1974)

Personal information
- Born: August 15, 1974 (age 52) Winnipeg, Manitoba, Canada
- Height: 1.78 m (5 ft 10 in)
- Weight: 58 kg (128 lb)

Sport
- Country: Canada
- Sport: Swimming
- Strokes: Backstroke
- Club: Manta Swim Club

Michelle Lischinsky (born August 15, 1974) is a Canadian former swimmer who specialized in backstroke events.

== Biography ==
She represented Canada, as a 25-year-old, at the 2000 Summer Olympics. She also trained for the Manitoba Swim Club under her longtime coach and mentor Vlastimil Černý, a Czech-born swimmer who competed in the 100-metre butterfly at the 1988 Summer Olympics in Seoul.

Lischinsky competed only in two swimming events at the 2000 Summer Olympics in Sydney. She finished behind her teammate Kelly Stefanyshyn from the Olympic Trials in Montreal with a FINA A-cut of 1:02.89. In the 100-metre backstroke, Lischinsky failed to qualify for the top 8 final, as she finished her semifinal run in a thirteenth-seeded time of 1:02.55. Six days later, in the 4×100-metre medley relay, the Canadians managed to settle for sixth place in the final at 4:07.55. Teaming with Christin Petelski, Jen Button, and Laura Nicholls in the prelims, Lischinsky led off a backstroke leg and recorded a split of 1:03.32.
