= Maria Santos (swimmer) =

Portuguese swimmer (born 1978)

Personal information
- Full name: Maria Carlos Martins dos Santos
- Nationality: Portugal
- Born: December 18, 1978 (age 47)

Sport
- Sport: Swimming
- Strokes: Backstroke and medley
- Club: GesLoures

Maria Carlos Martins dos Santos (born December 18, 1978) is a retired female backstroke and medley swimmer from Portugal, who competed for her native country at the 1996 Olympic Games in Atlanta, Georgia.
