= Monique Robins =

New Zealand swimmer (born 1983)

Personal information
- Full name: Monique Rachelle Robins
- National team: New Zealand
- Born: 25 September 1983 (age 43) Wellington, New Zealand
- Height: 1.71 m (5 ft 7 in)
- Weight: 54 kg (119 lb)

Sport
- Sport: Swimming
- Strokes: Freestyle, backstroke
- College team: Takapuna Swim Club
- Coach: Brett Naylor

Monique Rachelle Robins (born 25 September 1983) is a New Zealand former swimmer, who specialised in sprint freestyle and backstroke events. She represented New Zealand, as the youngest swimmer of the team (aged 16), at the 2000 Summer Olympics, and also formerly played for Takapuna Swim Club under her personal coach and mentor Brett Naylor.

Robins competed only in two swimming events at the 2000 Summer Olympics in Sydney. She achieved FINA B-standards of 56.72 (100 m freestyle) and 1:03.72 (100 m backstroke) from the NZ Olympic Trials in Auckland. On the second day of the Games, Robins placed twenty-sixth in the 100 m backstroke. Swimming in heat three, she held off Ukraine's Nadiya Beshevli to pick up a third seed by 14-hundredths of a second in 1:04.52. Three days later, in the 100 m freestyle, Robins challenged seven other swimmers in heat four, including Finland's 15-year-old Hanna-Maria Seppälä and Egypt's three-time Olympian Rania Elwani. She faded down the stretch on the final to take a sixth seed and thirty-third overall in 57.85, just 1.13 seconds below her entry standard and 1.5 behind leader Elwani.
