= Alessandra Cappa =

Italian swimmer

Personal information
- National team: Italy
- Born: 19 May 1982 (age 44)

Sport
- Sport: Swimming
Medal record
Representing Italy
Women's swimming
European Championships (LC)
Bronze medal – third place	2004 Madrid	50 m backstroke

Alessandra Cappa (born 19 May 1982) is a backstroke swimmer from Italy who won the bronze medal in the women's 50 metres backstroke event at the 2004 European Championships. She represented her native country a couple of months later at the 2004 Summer Olympics in Athens, Greece.
