= Diana MacManus =

American swimmer (born 1986)

Personal information
- Born: April 10, 1986 (age 40) San Diego, California, U.S.
Medal record
Women's swimming
Representing the United States
Pan Pacific Championships
| Gold medal – first place | 2002 Yokohama | 4x100 Medley Relay |
Pan American Games
| Gold medal – first place | 2003 Sto. Domingo | 100 Backstroke |
| Gold medal – first place | 2003 Sto. Domingo | 4x100 Medley Relay |
| Silver medal – second place | 2003 Sto. Domingo | 200 Backstroke |
Goodwill Games
| Silver medal – second place | 2001 Brisbane | 100 Backstroke |
| Silver medal – second place | 2001 Brisbane | 4x100 Medley Relay |
Short Course Worlds
| Silver medal – second place | 2002 Moscow | 4x100 Medley Relay |
| Bronze medal – third place | 2002 Moscow | 50 Backstroke |
| Bronze medal – third place | 2002 Moscow | 100 Backstroke |

Diana MacManus (born April 10, 1986) is a female backstroke swimmer from the United States. As a member of the USA National team she competed at the 2001 Goodwill Games held in Brisbane, Australia where she won two silver medals. At the 2002 Short Course World Championships in Moscow, Russia where she brought home two more bronze medals.

She then represented team USA at the 2002 Pan Pacific Swimming Championships in Yokohama, Japan and the 2003 Pan American Games in Santo Domingo, Dominican Republic where she won two gold medals and one bronze. She is also a three-time national champion in the 100m and 200m backstroke. A native of San Diego, California, she was trained by coach Dave Salo of the Irvine Novaquatics from the age of 12. She broke the USA's 11-12 age-group national record at age 12 in 50 yard backstroke, and at the age of 14, MacManus attempted to make the U.S. Olympic team in the 100m backstroke, finishing in fourth place in the U.S. Olympic trials.

At the Brazil meet of 2001–2002 FINA Swimming World Cup, she won both the 50 and 100 backstrokes.

== See also ==
- Swimming at the 2003 Pan American Games – Women's 100 meter backstroke
