= Miki Nakao =

Japanese swimmer (born 1978)

Personal information
- Full name: Miki Nakao
- Nationality: Japan
- Born: June 25, 1978 (age 48) Nagasaki, Japan
- Height: 1.62 m (5 ft 4 in)
- Weight: 48 kg (106 lb)

Sport
- Sport: Swimming
- Strokes: Backstroke
Medal record
Women's swimming
Representing Japan
Olympic Games
Bronze medal – third place	2000 Sydney	200 m backstroke
Pan Pacific Championships
Silver medal – second place	1999 Sydney	200 m backstroke
Bronze medal – third place	1997 Fukuoka	200 m backstroke
Summer Universiade
Gold medal – first place	1997 Catania	200 m backstroke
Gold medal – first place	1999 Mallorca	200 m backstroke

Miki Nakao (中尾 美樹, Nakao Miki) (born June 25, 1978, in Nagasaki, Nagasaki) is a former backstroke swimmer from Japan, who won the bronze medal in the 200m Backstroke at the 2000 Summer Olympics in Sydney, Australia.
