= Diana Mocanu =

Romanian swimmer

Medal record

Women's swimming

Representing Romania

Olympic Games
Gold medal – first place	2000 Sydney	100 m backstroke
Gold medal – first place	2000 Sydney	200 m backstroke

World Championships (LC)
Gold medal – first place	2001 Fukuoka	200 m backstroke
Silver medal – second place	2001 Fukuoka	100 m backstroke

European Championships (LC)
Silver medal – second place	2000 Helsinki	50 m backstroke
Silver medal – second place	2000 Helsinki	100 m backstroke
Silver medal – second place	2000 Helsinki	200 m backstroke
Bronze medal – third place	1999 Istanbul	100 m butterfly
Bronze medal – third place	2000 Helsinki	4×100 m medley

Diana Iuliana Mocanu (born 19 July 1984 in Brăila) is a Romanian former Olympic and national record holding swimmer. She swam at the 2000 Olympics, where she won in the 100 and 200 backstrokes, both in Romanian records. She also won in the 200 meter backstroke at the 2001 World Aquatics Championships.

In 2015, she was inducted into the International Swimming Hall of Fame.
