= Frances Adcock =

Australian swimmer

Personal information
- Full name: Frances Sarah Adcock
- National team: Australia
- Born: 9 August 1984 (age 42) Nottingham, England
- Height: 1.78 m (5 ft 10 in)

Sport
- Sport: Swimming
- Strokes: Backstroke
- Club: Norwood Swimming Club

Frances Sarah Adcock (born 9 August 1984) is a British-born Australian former competition swimmer who specialized in backstroke events.

Adcock was born in Nottingham, England. She moved to Adelaide, South Australia, and trained in artistic swimming and track cycling at National level, before squad swimming with the club Western Sharks.

Adcock is a three-time short-course Australian champion in the 200m backstroke breaking the Australian record for the event at the 2008 World SC Championship trials. Adcock qualified for the women's 200-metre backstroke at the 2004 Summer Olympics in Athens, by attaining both her personal record and an A-standard entry time of 2:13.48 from the Telstra Olympic Swimming Trials in Sydney. In the morning's preliminary heats, Adcock secured a fifteenth overall spot for the next round, with a time of 2:14.85.

Adcock retired from swimming to pursue her career as a news journalist for ABC Wide Bay in Queensland.

Adcock contributes to national ABC programs 'The World Today' and 'AM'.

She has two degrees in Journalism and International Studies.
