= Jennifer Fratesi =

Canadian swimmer (born 1984)

Personal information
- Full name: Jennifer Fratesi
- Nickname: Champ
- National team: Canada
- Born: April 20, 1984 (age 42) Sault Ste. Marie, Ontario
- Height: 1.75 m (5 ft 9 in)
- Weight: 64 kg (141 lb)

Sport
- Sport: Swimming
- Strokes: Backstroke, butterfly
- Club: Region of Waterloo Swim Club, Kitchener-Waterloo Swimming Centre, Sault Ste Marie Aquatics Club
Medal record
Women's swimming
Representing Canada
Pan Pacific Championships
Bronze medal – third place	2002 Yokohama	200 m backstroke

Jennifer Fratesi (born April 20, 1984) is a Canadian former competitive swimmer who specialized in backstroke events. Fratesi set a Canadian record of 2:11.16 in the 200-metre backstroke at the 2001 FINA World Championships in Fukuoka, Japan, placing 4th in the world. This national record would last nearly a decade, one of the oldest in the country. Fratesi grew up in Sault Ste. Marie Ontario swimming for the Sault Ste Marie Aquatics club until age 15, then relocated to the national swim center in Waterloo Ontario. She saw an immediate drop in her times here under the direction of Bud McAllister, an American born coach. Fratesi went on to win 1 gold, 1 silver and 2 bronze at the Junior Olympics in Sydney, Australia and won 10 national senior titles in her career.

Fratesi qualified for the women's 200-metre backstroke at the 2004 Summer Olympics in Athens, by attaining an A-standard entry time of 2:12.36 from the 2003 FINA World Championships in Barcelona, Spain. During the Olympics morning's preliminary heats, Fratesi recorded the overall sixth fastest time of 2:13.00 to advance to the semifinals. On the evening session, she missed out of the next day's final by two hundredths of a second (0.02) behind British swimmer and world champion Katy Sexton, lowering her Olympic time to 2:12.64. Fratesi also teamed up with Erin Gammel, Lauren van Oosten and Brittany Reimer for the women's 4x100-metre medley relay. Swimming the butterfly third leg, Fratesi recorded a time of 1:01.60, and the Canadian team went on to finish the second heat in sixth place, in a total time of 4:09.84.

Jennifer retired from swimming shortly after the 2004 Olympics to concentrate on her studies. She earned her MD at the University of Ottawa and specialized in radiology. She has additional training in thoracics and specializes in diagnosing lung cancer and lung infections. She was inducted into the Ontario swim hall of fame in 2016 and obtained the highest honor, the medal of merit in her hometown.
