= Clementine Stoney =

Australian swimmer

Personal information
- Full name: Clementine Stoney
- National team: Australia
- Born: 22 October 1981 (age 44) Albury, New South Wales
- Height: 1.79 m (5 ft 10 in)
- Weight: 63 kg (139 lb)

Sport
- Sport: Swimming
- Strokes: Backstroke
Medal record
Women's swimming
Representing Australia
World Championships (SC)
Silver medal – second place	2000 Athens	200 m backstroke

Clementine Stoney (born 22 October 1981) is an Australian former competitive swimmer and former world record-holder. She represented Australia at the 2000 Summer Olympics in Sydney. There she finished in thirteenth position in the 200-metre backstroke. Stoney won the silver medal in the 200-metre backstroke at the 2000 FINA Short Course World Championships in Athens, Greece.

She was an Australian Institute of Sport scholarship holder. Because of an illness, Stoney had to quit her swimming career in 2003.

== See also ==
- World record progression 200 metres backstroke
