= Noriko Inada =

Japanese swimmer

Personal information
- Full name: Noriko Inada
- Nationality: Japan
- Born: 27 July 1978 (age 47) Sōka, Japan
- Height: 1.67 m (5 ft 6 in)
- Weight: 60 kg (132 lb)

Sport
- Sport: Swimming
- Strokes: Backstroke
Medal record
Women's swimming
Representing Japan
Pan Pacific Championships
Gold medal – first place	1995 Atlanta	100m backstroke
Silver medal – second place	1995 Atlanta	200m backstroke
Bronze medal – third place	1995 Atlanta	4x100m medley
Asian Games
Silver medal – second place	2002 Busan	100 m backstroke
Silver medal – second place	2002 Busan	4x100 m medley
Universiade
Gold medal – first place	1997 Messina	100m backstroke
Gold medal – first place	1999 Palma	100m backstroke
Gold medal – first place	1999 Palma	4x100m medley
Silver medal – second place	1997 Messina	200m backstroke

Noriko Inada (稲田 法子, Inada Noriko) (born 27 July 1978 in Sōka, Saitama, Japan) is a Japanese swimmer who competed in the 1992, 2000, and 2004 Summer Olympics.

Inada retired after the 2004 Summer Olympics, though she joined the Phoenix Swim Club in 2008 and attempted to make a professional comeback in April 2010. In April 2012, she placed 3rd in the 100m backstroke in the Japan Championship, just missing out on a top 2 spot required for attending the 2012 Summer Olympics. 2014 saw her break three world records in the 35-39 age group at the 2014 FINA World Masters Championships. In 2015, she won the Japan Championship in the 50m backstroke time with a time of 28.36s, and placed second in the 100m backstroke with a time of 1m 1.27s. In 2017, she is still with the Phoenix Swim Club, as an assistant coach.
