= Dyana Calub =

Australian swimmer (born 1975)

Personal information
- Full name: Dyana Jane Calub
- National team: Australia
- Born: 28 November 1975 (age 50) Bourke, New South Wales
- Height: 1.75 m (5 ft 9 in)
- Weight: 69 kg (152 lb)

Sport
- Sport: Swimming
- Strokes: backstroke
- Club: Kingscliff Swim Club
Medal record
Women's swimming
Representing Australia
Olympic Games
Silver medal – second place	2000 Sydney	4×100 m medley
World Championships (LC)
Gold medal – first place	2001 Fukuoka	4×100 m medley
Pan Pacific Championships
Gold medal – first place	1999 Sydney	100m backstroke
Gold medal – first place	2002 Yokohama	4×100 m medley
Silver medal – second place	1999 Sydney	4×100 m medley
Silver medal – second place	2002 Yokohama	100 m backstroke
Commonwealth Games
Gold medal – first place	2002 Manchester	50 m backstroke
Gold medal – first place	2002 Manchester	4×100 m medley
Silver medal – second place	2002 Manchester	100 m backstroke

Dyana Jane Calub (born 28 November 1975) is an Australian former backstroke swimmer of the 2000s, who won the silver medal in the 4×100-metre medley relay at the 2000 Summer Olympics in Sydney.

Training at Kingscliff, New South Wales, Calub, first gained international selection after winning the 100- and 200-metre backstroke at the 2000 Australian Championships. At the Olympics, she combined with Leisel Jones, Susie O'Neill and Petria Thomas to register a silver medal in the 4×100-metre medley relay, trailing the Americans home by 3 seconds. In her individual events, Calub came seventh in the 100-metre backstroke and was eliminated in the heats of the 200m backstroke.

In 2001 at the 2001 World Aquatics Championships, Calub combined with Jones, Thomas and Sarah Ryan to win the 4×100-metre medley relay, the first time that Australia swimmers had defeated a United States team in the event at international competition. This was repeated at the 2002 Pan Pacific Swimming Championships in Yokohama, where she combined with Jones, Thomas and Jodie Henry. She also won two golds and a silver at the 2002 Commonwealth Games in Manchester. She retired at the end of 2002. She also won a silver in the 100-metre backstroke at the Pan Pacific Championships, behind Natalie Coughlin.

== See also ==
- List of Olympic medalists in swimming (women)
