= Mai Nakamura (backstroke swimmer) =

Japanese swimmer (born 1979)

Personal information
- Full name: Mai Nakamura
- Nationality: Japan
- Born: July 16, 1979 (age 47) Nagaoka, Niigata, Japan
- Height: 1.70 m (5 ft 7 in)

Sport
- Sport: Swimming
- Strokes: Backstroke
- Club: JSS Nagaoka Swimming School
Medal record
Women's swimming
Representing Japan
Olympic Games
Silver medal – second place	2000 Sydney	100 m backstroke
Bronze medal – third place	2000 Sydney	4×100 m medley
World Championships (LC)
Silver medal – second place	1998 Perth	100 m backstroke
Bronze medal – third place	1998 Perth	200 m backstroke
Bronze medal – third place	1998 Perth	4×100 m medley
World Championships (SC)
Gold medal – first place	1999 Hong Kong	100 m backstroke
Gold medal – first place	1999 Hong Kong	200 m backstroke
Gold medal – first place	1999 Hong Kong	4×100 m medley
Silver medal – second place	1999 Hong Kong	50 m backstroke
Pan Pacific Championships
Gold medal – first place	1997 Fukuoka	100 m backstroke
Gold medal – first place	1997 Fukuoka	200 m backstroke
Gold medal – first place	1999 Sydney	100 m backstroke
Bronze medal – third place	1995 Atlanta	100 m backstroke
Bronze medal – third place	1997 Fukuoka	4×100 m medley
Bronze medal – third place	1999 Sydney	4×100 m medley
Summer Universiade
Gold medal – first place	2001 Beijing	100 m backstroke
Silver medal – second place	2001 Beijing	50 m backstroke

Mai Nakamura (中村 真衣, Nakamura Mai; born July 16, 1979) is a former backstroke swimmer from Japan. At the 2000 Summer Olympics in Sydney, Nakamura won the silver medal in the 100m Backstroke and a bronze medal as part of the Women's Relay Team for the 4 x 100 metre Medley.

At one point, she was a holder of the 50 m backstroke world record.

== See also ==
- World record progression 50 metres backstroke
