= Kelly Stefanyshyn =

Canadian swimmer (born 1982)

Personal information
- Full name: Kelly Stefanyshyn
- National team: Canada
- Born: July 6, 1982 (age 44) Winnipeg, Manitoba, Canada
- Height: 1.75 m (5 ft 9 in)
- Weight: 63 kg (139 lb)

Sport
- Sport: Swimming
- Strokes: Backstroke
- Club: Pacific Dolphins
- College team: University of British Columbia
Medal record
Women's swimming
Representing Canada
World Championships (SC)
Silver medal – second place	1999 Hong Kong	100 m backstroke
Bronze medal – third place	1999 Hong Kong	200 m backstroke
Pan American Games
Gold medal – first place	1999 Winnipeg	100 m backstroke
Silver medal – second place	1999 Winnipeg	4x100 m medley
Bronze medal – third place	1999 Winnipeg	200 m backstroke
Commonwealth Games
Silver medal – second place	1998 Kuala Lumpur	100 m backstroke
Silver medal – second place	1998 Kuala Lumpur	4x100 m medley

Kelly Stefanyshyn (born July 6, 1982) is a Canadian competitive swimmer and backstroke specialist who represented her native country at the 2000 Summer Olympics in Sydney, Australia. Stefanyshyn was a member of Canada's sixth-place team in the women's 4x100-metre medley relay. Individually, she also finished eighth in the women's 200-metre backstroke, and competed in the semifinals of the 100-metre backstroke.

Stefanyshyn was previously a three-medal-winner at the 1999 Pan American Games in Winnipeg. She won a gold medal in the 100-metre backstroke, a silver in the 4x100-metre medley relay, and a bronze in the 200-metre backstroke.

She attended the University of British Columbia, where she was a member of the UBC Thunderbirds swimming and diving team in CIS competition from 2001 to 2004.

== See also ==
- List of Commonwealth Games medallists in swimming (women)
