= Swimming at the 1998 World Aquatics Championships – Women's 100 metre backstroke =

Women's 100 metre backstroke at the 1998 FINA World Championships
- Date: 14 January 1998
- Winning time: 1 minute 01.16 seconds

Medalists
gold medal	Lea Maurer	United States
silver medal	Mai Nakamura	Japan
bronze medal	Sandra Völker	Germany

The finals and the qualifying heats of the women's 100 metre backstroke event at the 1998 World Aquatics Championships were held on Wednesday 14 January 1998 in Perth, Western Australia.

== A Final ==
Rank	Name	Time
Gold medal	Lea Maurer (USA)	1:01.16
Silver medal	Mai Nakamura (JPN)	1:01.28
Bronze medal	Sandra Völker (GER)	1:01.47
4	Antje Buschschulte (GER)	1:01.81
5	Beth Botsford (USA)	1:02.31
6	Roxana Maracineanu (FRA)	1:02.40
7	Noriko Inada (JPN)	1:02.58
8	He Cihong (CHN)	1:02.69

== B Final ==
Rank	Name	Time
9	Sarah Price (GBR)	1:03.26
10	Meredith Smith (AUS)	1:03.45
11	Fabíola Molina (BRA)	1:03.60
12	Elli Overton (AUS)	1:03.61
13	Hélène Ricardo (FRA)	1:03.86
14	Ivette María (ESP)	1:04.25
15	Yuliya Fomenko (RUS)	1:04.27
16	Elena Grechushnikova (RUS)	1:04.79

== Qualifying heats ==
Rank	Name	Time
1	Lea Maurer (USA)	1:00.77
2	Mai Nakamura (JPN)	1:01.27
3	Antje Buschschulte (GER)	1:02.18
4	Sandra Völker (GER)	1:02.26
5	Roxana Maracineanu (FRA)	1:02.37
6	Beth Botsford (USA)	1:02.63
7	Noriko Inada (JPN)	1:02.85
8	He Cihong (CHN)	1:02.98
9	Meredith Smith (AUS)	1:03.05
10	Zhen Yingjuan (CHN)	1:03.18
11	Sarah Price (GBR)	1:03.54
12	Hélène Ricardo (FRA)	1:03.61
13	Fabíola Molina (BRA)	1:03.82
14	Ivette María (ESP)	1:03.91
15	Elli Overton (AUS)	1:03.94
16	Yuliya Fomenko (RUS)	1:04.00
17	Elena Grechushnikova (RUS)	1:04.15
18	Isabela Burczyk (POL)	1:04.33
19	Sofie Wolfs (BEL)	1:04.35
20	Maria Santos (POR)	1:04.41
21	Katy Sexton (GBR)	1:04.59
22	Alenka Kejžar (SLO)	1:04.75
23	Alena Nyvltová (CZE)	1:04.89
24	Rania Elwani (EGY)	1:05.15
25	Charlene Wittstock (RSA)	1:05.17
26	Kateřina Pivoňková (CZE)	1:05.46
27	Annamaria Kiss (HUN)	1:05.50

== See also ==
- 1996 Women's Olympic Games 100m Backstroke (Atlanta)
- 1997 Women's World SC Championships 100m Backstroke (Gothenburg)
- 1997 Women's European LC Championships 100m Backstroke (Seville)
- 2000 Women's Olympic Games 100m Backstroke (Sydney)
