= 1998 European Short Course Swimming Championships – Women's 200 metre backstroke =

The finals and the qualifying heats of the Women's 200 metres Backstroke event at the 1998 European Short Course Swimming Championships were held on the first day of the competition, on Friday 11 December 1998 in Sheffield, England.

== Finals ==
RANK	FINAL	TIME
Gold medal	Antje Buschschulte (GER)	2:07.31
Silver medal	Helen Don-Duncan (GBR)	2:09.83
Bronze medal	Yuliya Fomenko (RUS)	2:10.38
4.	Anu Koivisto (FIN)	2:11.24
5.	Alenka Kejžar (SLO)	2:11.71
6.	Ivette María (ESP)	2:11.75
7.	Kateřina Pivoňková (CZE)	2:12.09
8.	Ania Gustamelski (ISR)	2:13.81

== Qualifying Heats ==
RANK	HEATS RANKING	TIME
1.	Yuliya Fomenko (RUS)	2:10.25
2.	Antje Buschschulte (GER)	2:10.56
3.	Kateřina Pivoňková (CZE)	2:11.40
4.	Alenka Kejžar (SLO)	2:11.52
5.	Anu Koivisto (FIN)	2:11.58
6.	Helen Don-Duncan (GBR)	2:12.63
7.	Ivette María (ESP)	2:13.06
8.	Ania Gustamelski (ISR)	2:13.47
9.	Vanesa Rojo (ESP)	2:13.56
10.	Cathleen Rund (GER)	2:14.53
11.	Marcela Kubalčíková (CZE)	2:15.06
12.	Izabela Burczyk (POL)	2:15.10
13.	Katerini Bliamou (GRE)	2:15.37
14.	Marion Houel (FRA)	2:16.57
15.	Katy Sexton (GBR)	2:17.41
16.	Alessandra Cappa (ITA)	2:18.25
17.	Anne-Françoise Glatre (FRA)	2:18.97
18.	Edith van der Schilden (LUX)	2:20.92

== See also ==
- 1996 Women's Olympic Games 200m Backstroke
- 1997 Women's World SC Championships 200m Backstroke
- 1997 Women's European LC Championships 200m Backstroke
- 1998 Women's World LC Championships 200m Backstroke
- 2000 Women's Olympic Games 100m Backstroke
