= Cătălin =

Cătălin (pronounced [kətəˈlin]) is a Romanian male first name, the masculine form of Cătălina ("Catherine"). It may refer to:

- Alexandru Cătălin Neagu (born 1993), Romanian footballer
- Cătălin Albu (born 2004), Romanian footballer
- Cătălin Anghel (born 1974), Romanian footballer
- Cătălin Baciu (born 1988), Romanian basketball player
- Cătălin Bălescu (born 1962), Romanian visual artist
- Cătălin Barbu (born 1999), Romanian footballer
- Cătălin Beca (born 1985), Romanian rugby union player
- Cătălin Bucur (born 1983), Romanian footballer
- Cătălin Burlacu (born 1977), Romanian basketball player
- Cătălin Căbuz (born 1996), Romanian footballer
- Cătălin Carp (born 1993), Moldovan footballer
- Cătălin Cherecheș (born 1978), Romanian politician
- Cătălin Chirilă (born 1998), Romanian canoeist
- Cătălin Chiș (born 1988), Romanian footballer
- Cătălin Cîmpeanu (born 1985), Romanian sprinter
- Cătălin Cîrjan (born 2002), Romanian footballer
- Cătălin Costache (born 1987), Romanian canoeist
- Cătălin Crăciun (born 1991), Romanian footballer
- Cătălin Cursaru (born 1978), Romanian footballer
- Cătălin Dedu (born 1987), Romanian footballer
- Cătălin Doman (born 1988), Romanian footballer
- Cătălin Drăguceanu (born 1970), Romanian rugby union player
- Cătălin Drulă (born 1981), Romanian politician
- Cătălin Fercu (born 1986), Romanian rugby union player
- Cătălin-Ionuț Gârd (born 1981), Romanian-American tennis player
- Cătălin Gogor (born 2001), Romanian footballer
- Cătălin Golofca (born 1990), Romanian footballer
- Cătălin Grigore (born 1977), Romanian footballer
- Cătălin Hîldan (1976–2000), Romanian footballer
- Cătălin Hlistei (born 1994), Romanian footballer
- Cătălin Ion (born 1998), Romanian footballer
- Cătălin Itu (born 1999), Romanian footballer
- Cătălin Ivan (born 1978), Romanian politician
- Cătălin Lichioiu (born 1981), Romanian footballer
- Cătălin Liță (born 1975), Romanian footballer
- Cătălin Luchian (born 1962), Romanian sailor
- Cătălin Măgureanu (born 2000), Romanian footballer
- Cătălin Mureșan(born in 1967)Romanian artist seinian
- Cătălin Măruță (born 1978), Romanian television host
- Cătălin Mitulescu (born 1972), Romanian film director
- Cătălin Moroșanu (born 1984), Romanian kickboxer
- Cătălin Mulțescu (born 1976), Romanian footballer
- Cătălin Munteanu (born 1979), Romanian footballer
- Cătălin Necula (born 1969), Romanian footballer
- Cătălin Nicolae (born 1980), Romanian rugby union player
- Cătălin Pârvulescu (born 1991), Romanian footballer
- Cătălin Păun (born 1988), Romanian footballer
- Cătălin Petrișor (born 9 August 1992), Romanian basketball player
- Cătălin Predoiu (born 1968), Romanian lawyer, Justice Minister and Prime Minister
- Cătălin Răcănel (born 1976), Romanian footballer
- Cătălin Samoilă (born 1990), Romanian footballer
- Cătălin Sasu (born 1968), Romanian rugby union player
- Cătălin Savin (born 1990), Romanian footballer
- Cătălin Straton (born 1989), Romanian footballer
- Cătălin Ștefănescu (born 1994), Romanian footballer
- Cătălin Tănase (born 1962), Romanian biologist
- Cătălin Țăranu (born 1973), Romanian Go player
- Cătălin Tecuceanu (born 1999), Romanian-born Italian runner
- Cătălin Teniță (born 1977), Romanian politician
- Cătălin Țîră (born 1994), Romanian footballer
- Cătălin Tofan (born 1969), Romanian footballer
- Cătălin Tolontan (born 1968), Romanian sports journalist
- Cătălin Toriște (born 1996), Romanian footballer
- Cătălin Ungur (born 1994), Romanian swimmer
- Cătălin Voicu (born 1965), Romanian politician
- Cătălin Vraciu (born 1989), Romanian footballer
- Cătălin Vulturar (born 2004), Romanian footballer
- Cătălin Zmărăndescu (born 1973), Romanian mixed martial artist and boxer
- Robert Cătălin Dascălu (born 1984), Romanian rugby union player
- Vali-Cătălin Mureșan (born 1990), Romanian rugby union player
