= Swimming at the 1997 European Aquatics Championships – Women's 100 metre backstroke =

The final of the Women's 100 metres Backstroke event at the European LC Championships 1997 was held on Thursday 21 August 1997 in Seville, Spain.

== Finals ==
RANK	FINAL A	TIME
	Antje Buschschulte (GER)	1:01.74
	Roxana Maracineanu (FRA)	1:01.84
	Sandra Völker (GER)	1:02.23
4.	Olga Kochetkova (RUS)	1:02.80
5.	Sarah Price (GBR)	1:03.41
6.	Izabela Burczyk (POL)	1:03.56
7.	Elena Grechoushnikova (RUS)	1:03.77
8.	Suze Valen (NED)	1:04.13

RANK	FINAL B	TIME
9.	Ivette María (ESP)	1:03.93
10.	Joanne Deakins (GBR)	1:04.33
11.	Hanna Kopachenya (BLR)	1:04.34
12.	Maria Carlos Santos (POR)	1:04.37
13.	Hélène Ricardo (FRA)	1:04.87
14.	Joanna Gronek (POL)	1:05.04
15.	Francesca Bissoli (ITA)	1:05.14
16.	Alena Nyvltová (CZE)	1:05.31

== Qualifying heats ==
RANK	HEATS RANKING	TIME
1.	Roxana Maracineanu (FRA)	1:02.02
2.	Antje Buschschulte (GER)	1:02.46
3.	Olga Kochetkova (RUS)	1:02.73
4.	Sarah Price (GBR)	1:02.78
5.	Sandra Völker (GER)	1:02.88
6.	Elena Grechoushnikova (RUS)	1:03.95
7.	Izabela Burczyk (POL)	1:04.06
8.	Suze Valen (NED)	1:04.21
9.	Maria Carlos Santos (POR)	1:04.24
10.	Hanna Kopachenya (BLR)	1:04.24
11.	Joanne Deakins (GBR)	1:04.33
12.	Francesca Bissoli (ITA)	1:04.36
13.	Hélène Ricardo (FRA)	1:04.37
14.	Alena Nyvltová (CZE)	1:04.53
15.	Joanna Gronek (POL)	1:04.93
16.	Ivette María (ESP)	1:05.03
17.	Madalina Badea (ROM)	1:05.08
18.	Dominique Diezi (SUI)	1:05.24
19.	Anu Koivisto (FIN)	1:05.46
20.	Kateřina Pivoňková (CZE)	1:05.46
21.	Yseult Gervy (BEL)	1:05.69
22.	Brenda Starink (NED)	1:05.83
23.	Annamaria Kiss (HUN)	1:06.25
24.	Catalina Casaru (ROM)	1:06.36
25.	Eydis Konradsdottir (ISL)	1:07.34

== See also ==
- 1996 Women's Olympic Games 100m Backstroke
- 1997 Women's World Championships (SC) 100m Backstroke
