= Swimming at the 1998 World Aquatics Championships – Women's 200 metre backstroke =

Women's 200 metre backstroke at the 1998 FINA World Championships
- Date: 17 January 1998
- Winning time: 2 minutes 11.26 seconds

Medalists
gold medal	Roxana Maracineanu	France
silver medal	Dagmar Hase	Germany
bronze medal	Mai Nakamura	Japan

The finals and the qualifying heats of the women's 200 metre backstroke event at the 1998 World Aquatics Championships were held on Saturday 17 January 1998 in Perth, Western Australia.

== A Final ==
Rank	Name	Time
Gold medal	Roxana Maracineanu (FRA)	2:11.26
Silver medal	Dagmar Hase (GER)	2:11.45
Bronze medal	Mai Nakamura (JPN)	2:12.22
4	Cathleen Rund (GER)	2:12.72
5	Lea Maurer (USA)	2:13.04
6	Miki Nakao (JPN)	2:13.13
7	Meredith Smith (AUS)	2:13.70
8	Hélène Ricardo (FRA)	2:15.01

== B Final ==
Rank	Name	Time
9	Amanda Adkins (USA)	2:14.25
10	Ivette María (ESP)	2:16.17
11	Helen Don-Duncan (GBR)	2:16.94
12	Isabela Burczyk (POL)	2:17.00
13	Kateřina Pivoňková (CZE)	2:17.31
14	Elena Grechushnikova (RUS)	2:17.69
15	Emma Johnson (AUS)	2:19.35
16	Fabíola Molina (BRA)	2:19.67

== Qualifying heats ==
Rank	Heat	Lane	Name	Nationality	Time	Notes
1			Dagmar hase	Germany	2:13.29	
2			Lea Maurer	United States		
3			roxana maracineanu	France		
4			Mai Nakamura	Japan		
5			Meredeith Smith	Australia		
6			Hélène Ricardo	France		
7			Cathleen Rund	Germany		
8			Miki Nakao	Japan		
9			Kateřina Pivoňková	Czech Republic		
10			He Cihong	China		
11				Spain		
12			Amanda Adkins	United States		
13			Isabela Burczyk	Poland		
14			Elena Grechushnikova	Russia		
15			helen don duncan	Great Britain		

== See also ==
- 1996 Women's Olympic Games 200m Backstroke (Atlanta)
- 1997 Women's World SC Championships 200m Backstroke (Gothenburg)
- 1997 Women's European LC Championships 200m Backstroke (Seville)
- 2000 Women's Olympic Games 200m Backstroke (Sydney)
