= Swimming at the 1996 Summer Olympics – Women's 200 metre backstroke =

Women's 200 metre backstroke at the Games of the XXVI Olympiad
- Venue: Georgia Tech Aquatic Center
- Date: 25 July 1996 (heats & finals)
- Competitors: 33 from 28 nations
- Winning time: 2:07.83

Medalists
1st place, gold medalist(s)		Krisztina Egerszegi	Hungary
2nd place, silver medalist(s)		Whitney Hedgepeth	United States
3rd place, bronze medalist(s)		Cathleen Rund	Germany

The women's 200 metre backstroke event at the 1996 Summer Olympics took place on 25 July at the Georgia Tech Aquatic Center in Atlanta, United States.

== Records ==
Prior to this competition, the existing world and Olympic records were as follows.

World record	Krisztina Egerszegi (HUN)	2:06.62	Athens, Greece	25 August 1991
Olympic record	Krisztina Egerszegi (HUN)	2:07.06	Barcelona, Spain	31 July 1992

== Results ==
=== Heats ===
Rule: The eight fastest swimmers advance to final A (Q), while the next eight to final B (q).

Rank	Heat	Lane	Name	Nationality	Time	Notes
1	5	4	Krisztina Egerszegi	Hungary	2:09.18	Q
2	4	3	Whitney Hedgepeth	United States	2:11.63	Q
3	4	6	Anke Scholz	Germany	2:12.73	Q
4	4	4	Miki Nakao	Japan	2:12.92	Q
5	3	5	Nina Zhivanevskaya	Russia	2:13.32	Q
6	3	3	Lorenza Vigarani	Italy	2:13.58	Q
6	5	5	Cathleen Rund	Germany	2:13.58	Q
8	5	2	Anna Simcic	New Zealand	2:13.74	Q
9	3	4	Beth Botsford	United States	2:14.16	q
10	3	2	Hélène Ricardo	France	2:14.18	q
10	3	7	Lee Chang-ha	South Korea	2:14.18	q, NR
12	5	6	Chen Yan	China	2:14.74	q
13	5	3	Mai Nakamura	Japan	2:15.05	q
14	5	1	Joanne Deakins	Great Britain	2:15.12	q
15	4	7	Cătălina Cășaru	Romania	2:15.92	q
16	4	2	Marianne Kriel	South Africa	2:15.99	q
17	4	1	Mette Jacobsen	Denmark	2:16.68	
18	4	5	Nicole Stevenson	Australia	2:16.71	
19	3	1	Izabela Burczyk	Poland	2:16.91	NR
20	2	4	Julie Howard	Canada	2:17.25	
21	5	8	Kateřina Pivoňková	Czech Republic	2:18.20	
22	4	8	Yseult Gervy	Belgium	2:18.69	
23	3	8	Ivette María	Spain	2:18.72	
24	5	7	Lydia Lipscombe	New Zealand	2:19.54	
25	2	2	Anu Koivisto	Finland	2:19.58	NR
26	2	6	Petra Chaves	Portugal	2:20.49	
27	1	5	Maja Grozdanić	FR Yugoslavia	2:20.65	
28	3	6	Wu Yanyan	China	2:20.89	
29	2	5	Akiko Thomson	Philippines	2:21.36	
30	1	4	Praphalsai Minpraphal	Thailand	2:21.82	
31	2	3	Aikaterini Klepkou	Greece	2:22.83	
32	1	3	Dijana Kvesić	Bosnia and Herzegovina	2:23.78	
33	2	7	Lin Chi-chan	Chinese Taipei	2:24.50	

=== Finals ===
==== Final B ====
Rank	Lane	Name	Nationality	Time	Notes
9	2	Mai Nakamura	Japan	2:13.40	
10	4	Beth Botsford	United States	2:13.48	
11	6	Chen Yan	China	2:14.37	
12	7	Joanne Deakins	Great Britain	2:14.50	
13	5	Lee Chang-ha	South Korea	2:14.55	
14	1	Cătãlina Cășaru	Romania	2:15.15	
15	3	Hélène Ricardo	France	2:16.29	
16	8	Marianne Kriel	South Africa	2:18.41	

==== Final A ====
Rank	Lane	Name	Nationality	Time	Notes
1st place, gold medalist(s)	4	Krisztina Egerszegi	Hungary	2:07.83	
2nd place, silver medalist(s)	5	Whitney Hedgepeth	United States	2:11.98	
3rd place, bronze medalist(s)	7	Cathleen Rund	Germany	2:12.06	
4	3	Anke Scholz	Germany	2:12.90	
5	6	Miki Nakao	Japan	2:13.57	
6	8	Anna Simcic	New Zealand	2:14.04	
7	1	Lorenza Vigarani	Italy	2:14.56	
8	2	Nina Zhivanevskaya	Russia	2:14.59	
