= 1997 FINA Short Course World Championships – Women's 100m backstroke =

The finals and the qualifying heats of the women's 100 metres backstroke event at the 1997 FINA Short Course World Championships were held on the second day of the competition, on Friday 18 April 1997 in Gothenburg, Sweden.

== Finals ==
RANK	FINAL A	TIME
	Lu Donghua (CHN)	59.75
	Chen Yan (swimmer, born 1979) (CHN)	1:00.14
	Misty Hyman (USA)	1:00.17
4.	Lia Oberstar (USA)	1:01.11
5.	Olga Kochetkova (RUS)	1:01.24
6.	Tomoko Hagiwara (JPN)	1:01.25
7.	Meredith Smith (AUS)	1:01.28
—	Sandra Völker (GER)	DSQ

RANK	FINAL B	TIME
9.	Antje Buschschulte (GER)	1:00.62
10.	Dyana Calub (AUS)	1:01.29
11.	Sarah Price (GBR)	1:01.57
12.	Zoe Cray (GBR)	1:01.86
13.	Francesca Bissoli (ITA)	1:02.08
14.	Lisa Virgini (CAN)	1:02.10
15.	Anna Kopachenia (BLR)	1:02.26
16.	Camilla Johansson (SWE)	1:02.52

== See also ==
- 1996 Women's Olympic Games 100m Backstroke
- 1997 Women's European LC Championships 100m Backstroke
