= Catiline (disambiguation) =

Catiline or Catilina (Latin) may refer to:

- Catiline, Lucius Sergius Catilina (108 BC–62 BC), Roman politician and author of a conspiracy to overthrow the Roman Republic
  - Conspiracy of Catiline, 63 BC failed plot against the Roman Republic by Catilina
  - Catiline Orations (63 BC) of Cicero, exposing the Catilinarian conspiracy to the Roman Senate
  - The Conspiracy of Catiline, one of Sallust's two major surviving works
  - Catiline His Conspiracy (1611), a tragedy by Ben Jonson
  - Catilina (1792), opera by Antonio Salieri with libretto by Giovanni Battista Casti
  - Catiline (play) (1850), Henrik Ibsen's first play
- Catilina Aubameyang (b. 1983), Gabonese soccer player

== See also ==
- Catalina (disambiguation)
