= Vincent Jeanbrun =

French politician (born 1984)

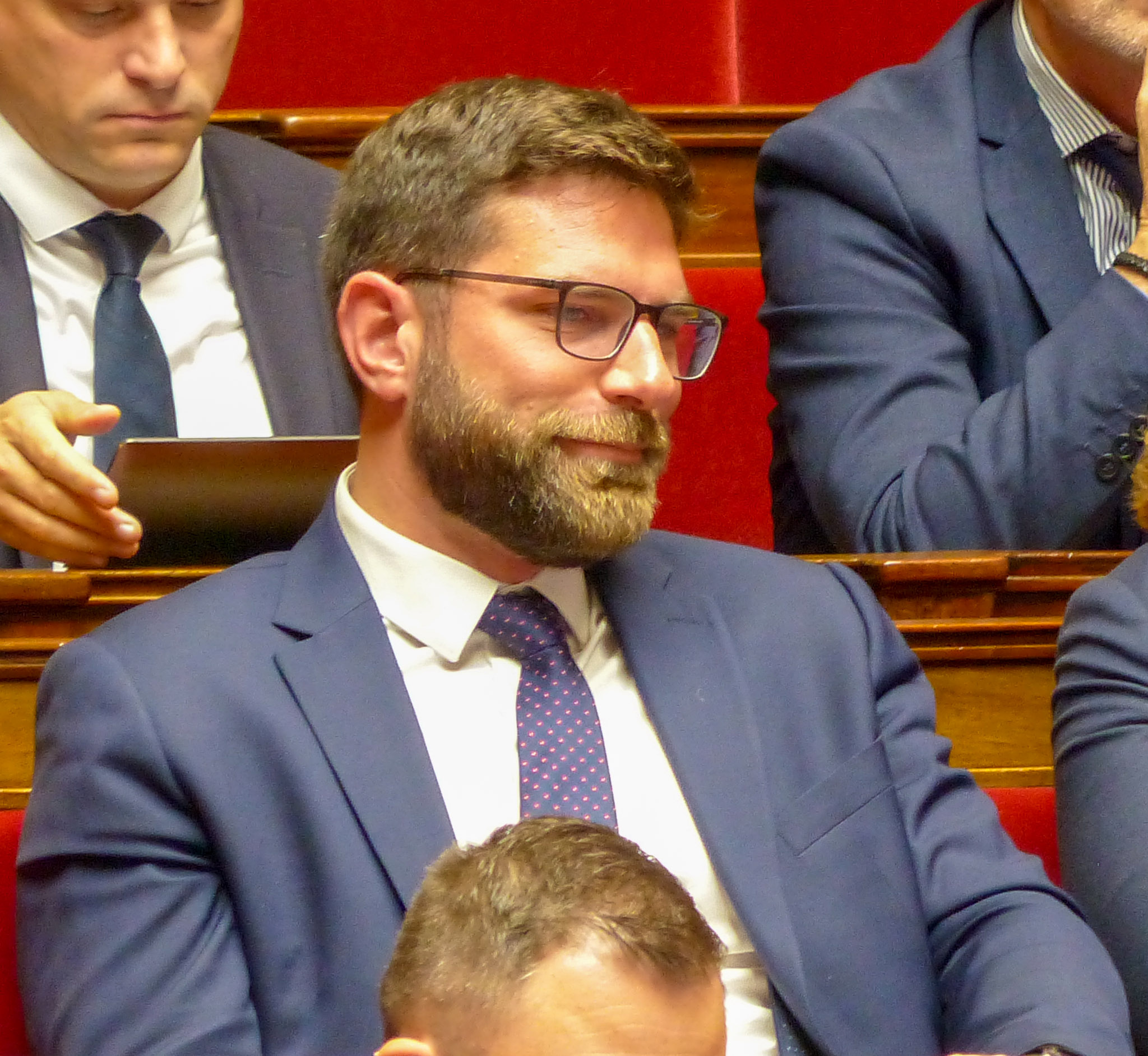
- Jeanbrun in 2024

Minister of the City and Housing
- Incumbent
- Assumed office 12 October 2025
- Prime Minister: Sébastien Lecornu
- Preceded by: Juliette Méadel (Minister Delegate for the City); Éric Woerth (Housing)

Member of the National Assembly for Val-de-Marne's 7th constituency
- In office 8 July 2024 – 12 November 2025
- Preceded by: Rachel Keke
- Succeeded by: Nicolas Tryzna

Mayor of L'Haÿ-les-Roses
- In office 30 March 2014 – 11 October 2024
- Preceded by: Pierre Coilbault
- Succeeded by: Clément Decrouy

Personal details
- Born: 5 May 1984 (age 42) Paris, France
- Party: Union for a Popular Movement (2004–2015); The Republicans (2015–2019, 2021–2025)
- Children: 2

Vincent Jeanbrun (French pronunciation: [vɛ̃sɑ̃ ʒɑ̃bʁɛ̃]; born 5 May 1984) is a French politician who has served as Minister of the City and Housing since 12 October 2025. A former member of The Republicans (LR), from which he was expelled for joining the second Lecornu government following the party's refusal to participate, Jeanbrun previously served as mayor of L'Haÿ-les-Roses (2014–2024) and represented the 7th constituency of Val-de-Marne in the National Assembly (2024–2025).

== Political career ==
=== Career in regional politics ===
Active within the youth wing of the Union for a Popular Movement, Jeanbrun ran in 2011 for the General Council of Hauts-de-Seine in the now-former canton of Nanterre-Sud-Est, placing fifth in the first round. In 2012, he became a parliamentary assistant to Valérie Pécresse.

In 2014, Jeanbrun was elected mayor of L'Haÿ-les-Roses. He was reelected in 2020. In the 2015 departmental elections, he was elected to the Departmental Council of Val-de-Marne for the canton of L'Haÿ-les-Roses, a seat he held from April until his resignation the following December, when he was elected to the Regional Council of Île-de-France, where he was elected president of the majority coalition group in 2021.

=== Member of the National Assembly, 2022–2025 ===
In the 2022 legislative election, Jeanbrun contested the 7th constituency of Val-de-Marne but came in third in the first round, behind Rachel Keke and Roxana Maracineanu. In the 2024 snap election, he contested the seat again, this time winning by 545 votes, scoring 50.67% of the second-round vote against Keke.

In parliament, Jeanbrun served on the Committee on Foreign Affairs from 2024 to 2025.

In The Republicans' 2025 leadership election, Jeanbrun endorsed Laurent Wauquiez to succeed Éric Ciotti as the party's new chair and joined his campaign team.

Later in 2025, he was appointed Minister of the City and Housing in the second government of Prime Minister Sébastien Lecornu, leading to him being suspended from The Republicans, which refused to enter the government.

== Personal life ==
Jeanbrun is the son of a delivery driver and an Italian stay-at-home mother. He grew up in a social housing project in L'Haÿ-les-Roses.

On 2 July 2023, his home was attacked during the Nahel Merzouk riots; one of his two children and his wife were injured as they fled the building.

== Electoral history ==
2022 legislative election: Val-de-Marne's 7th constituency
Party	Candidate	Votes	%	±%
LFI (NUPÉS)	Rachel Keke	11,200	37.22	+8.51
LREM (Ensemble)	Roxana Maracineanu	7,153	23.77	-13.39
LR (UDC)	Vincent Jeanbrun	5,514	18.32	−4.14
RN	Ugo Iannuzzi	2,856	9.49	+2.04
REC	Noël Nadal	1,125	3.74	N/A
DIV	El-Mehdi Lemaanni	1,100	3.66	N/A
DVE	Pascale Corbin	690	2.29	N/A
Others	N/A	457		
Turnout		30,689	46.33	−1.55
2nd round result
LFI (NUPÉS)	Rachel Keke	14,663	50.30	N/A
LREM (Ensemble)	Roxana Maracineanu	14,486	49.70	−3.00
Turnout		29,149	46.34	+6.71
LFI gain from LREM				
