= Cătălina =

Cătălina (pronounced [kətəˈlina]) is a Romanian female first name, cognate of the English Catherine. It may refer to:

== People ==
- Cătălina Axente, Romanian wrestler
- Cătălina Cășaru (born 1979), Romanian swimmer
- Cătălina Cristea (born 1975), Romanian tennis player
- Cătălina Gheorghițoaia (born 1975), Romanian fencer
- Cătălina Gheorghiu (born 1969), Romanian runner
- Cătălina Ponor (born 1987), Romanian gymnast

== Places in Romania ==
- Cătălina, a village in Coltău, Maramureș County
- Cătălina, a village in Panticeu, Cluj County

== See also ==
- Cătălin, the masculine form of the name
- Catalina (disambiguation)
