= Kvesić =

Origin
- Language: Croatian from Old Croatian "kves" or "kvesa"
- Meaning: small cross - possibly occupational last name for a cross maker and/or protrude
- Region of origin: Bosnia and Herzegovina / Croatia (Dalmatia region)

Other names
- Variant forms: Kvesic, Kvesich

Kvesić (IPA: [ˈkvesitɕ]) or Kvesic/Kvesich is a Croatian and Herzegovinian surname. The surname has its roots in the Dalmatia region. It is believed the surname is derived from the Old Croatian term kves (with the meaning "cross", or "small cross") or from the term kvesa (meaning to stand out or protrude) with the addition of the Slavic surname forming suffix -ić. Notable people with the surname include:

- Anđelko Kvesić (born 1969), retired Bosnian Croat footballer
- Anđelo Kvesić (born 1995), Croatian karateka
- Dijana Kvesić (born 1977), Bosnian Croat swimmer
- Ivan Kvesić (born 1996), Croatian karateka athlete
- Josip Kvesić (born 1990), Bosnian Croat footballer
- Kornelija Kvesić (born 1963), Yugoslav and Croatian former female basketball player
- Mario Kvesić (born 1992), Bosnian Croat footballer
- Matt Kvesic (born 1992), English professional rugby union player
