= Richard Dell'Agnola =

French politician

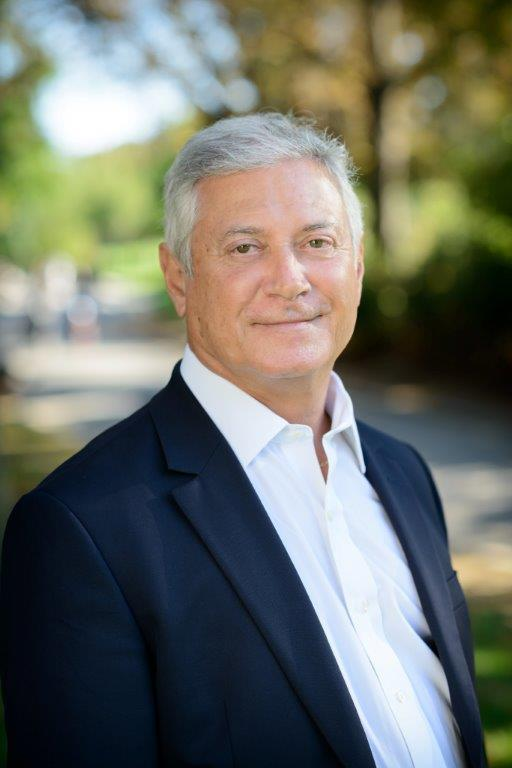
- Richard Dell'Agnola

Mayor of Thiais
- Incumbent
- Assumed office 14 March 1983
- Preceded by: Jean René Roger Gaudaire

Member of the National Assembly for Val-de-Marne's 12th constituency
- In office 2 April 1993 – 21 April 1997
- Preceded by: Pierre Tabanou (PS)
- Succeeded by: Patrick Sève (PS)
- In office 19 June 2002 – 17 June 2012
- Preceded by: Patrick Sève (PS)
- Succeeded by: Jean-Jacques Bridey (PS)

General Councillor of Val-de-Marne
- In office 17 March 1985 – 17 April 1993
- Preceded by: Guy Pettenati (PCF)
- Succeeded by: Bruno Tran (RPR)

Departmental Councillor of Val-de-Marne
- In office 29 March 2015 – 30 April 2017
- Succeeded by: Nicolas Tryzna (LR)

Vice president of Établissement public térritorial T12
- Incumbent
- Assumed office 12 January 2016

Metropolitan Councillor appointed to the Métropole du Grand Paris
- Incumbent
- Assumed office 11 March 2016

Regional Councillor of Île-de-France
- In office 16 March 1998 – 27 June 2002

Personal details
- Born: 6 February 1949 (age 77) Rabat, French Morocco (Modern day Morocco)
- Party: UMP; The Republicans

Richard Dell'Agnola (born 6 February 1949 in Rabat, Morocco) is a member of the National Assembly of France. He represents the Val-de-Marne department, and is a member of the Union for a Popular Movement.

== Biography ==
Born on February 6, 1949, in Rabat, Morocco, Richard Dell’Agnola moved to Val-de-Marne at a very young age. After studying law, he began his career at the Ministry of Justice.

He was notably a member of the cabinet of the Minister of Justice from 1972 to 1978, where he participated in the work of the “Information Technology and Freedom” commission.

When he was a member of parliament, Richard Dell'Agnola spearheaded the law passed on February 3, 2003, relating to driving under the influence of substances or plants classified as narcotics. Inspired by the measures used to crack down on drunk driving, the law makes driving under the influence of narcotics a crime, allowing for the possibility of testing all drivers if there are one or more reasons to suspect them, and making testing mandatory in the event of an accident causing bodily injury.

He is married and has a daughter.
