= Rachel Keke =

French politician (born 1974)

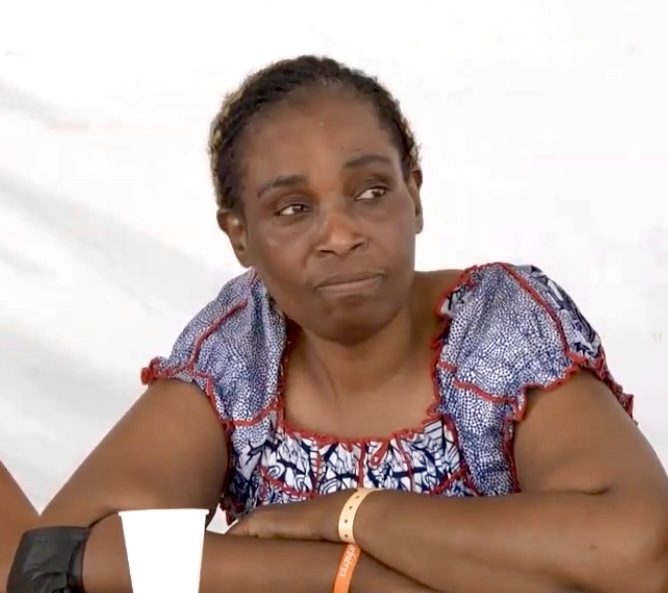
- Keke in 2021

Member of the National Assembly for Val-de-Marne's 7th constituency
- In office 22 June 2022 – 9 June 2024
- Preceded by: Jean-Jacques Bridey
- Succeeded by: Vincent Jeanbrun

Personal details
- Born: Rachel Keke Raïssa; 30 May 1974 (age 52) Abobo, Ivory Coast
- Party: La France Insoumise
- Spouse: Bobby Yodé (m. 2016)
- Children: 5
- Profession: Housekeeper

Rachel Keke Raïssa (French pronunciation: [ʁaʃɛl keke ʁaisa]; born 30 May 1974) is an Ivorian-born French politician and former chambermaid. A member of the National Assembly from 2022 to 2024, she represents the 7th constituency of the Val-de-Marne department. She is a member of La France Insoumise (LFI).

== Early life ==
Keke was born on 30 May 1974 in Abobo, Ivory Coast. Her father was a bus driver and her mother sold clothing, until her death when Keke was 12. Her grandfather fought with the French forces during World War II. At the age of 16, she began working as a hairdresser and other odd jobs.

Keke moved to France in 2000 (following the 1999 Ivorian coup d'état that overthrew Henri Konan Bédié), taking up a job as a hairdresser in the hair salon of a relative, also finding work as a chambermaid and housekeeper. She was naturalised as a French citizen in 2015.

== Career ==
=== Union leader ===
A CGT trade union representative between 2019 and 2021, she was one of the leaders of a successful strike by housekeepers at the Ibis hotel in Batignolles, Paris. Twenty workers, employed as subcontractors, struck for better pay and improved working conditions beginning in July 2019, and signed an agreement winning the majority of their demands in May 2021.

Keke began working as a chambermaid at the Ibis Batignolles hotel in April 2003, employed by a series of subcontractors. A part-time worker, until 2017 she was unsuccessful in seeking a full-time role. She became a housekeeper in 2019. Her health was affected by her working conditions, and she went out sick in February 2019. Her net monthly salary rose from 1,300 to 1,700 euros thanks to the success of the 2019-2021 strike. She said that the job "destroys the body. There are carpal tunnel syndromes, tendonitis, back pain...". In the course of her work, she also confronted racism and several attempted sexual assaults.

=== Member of Parliament, 2022-2024 ===
In the first round of the 2022 French legislative election, Keke was a candidate for La France Insoumise (LFI) on the New Ecological and Social People's Union (NUPES) slate, the left-wing alliance of political parties. Running for the 7th constituency of the Val-de-Marne department, Keke finished first with 37.22% of the vote; Roxana Maracineanu, former Sports Minister and Olympic silver medalist swimmer, came in second, making the runoff with 23.77%. Keke's campaign focused on outreach to non-voters, while Maracineanu called for a "republican front against the far left"; this drew criticism from the NUPES who saw this as equating them with France's extreme right. In the second and final round, Keke won by 177 votes, scoring 51.38% of the vote against 48.62% for Maracineanu. A profile by France24 noted that Keke's election (along with other newly elected deputies such as Rassemblement national's Katiana Levavasseur) indicated a growing trend of elected politicians from lower economic backgrounds taking up office.

She stood out during her first steps in the National French Assembly, denouncing the refusal of the members of the presidential majority to increase the minimum wage to extend the "prime Macron". She accuses them of not knowing what it is to receive only 800 euros a month, of despising essential professions and not knowing their suffering.

In the 2024 election, she lost her seat in the second round to Republican's Vincent Jeanbrun.

== Personal life ==
Keke has five children. In 2016, she married Bobby Yodé, a zouglou musician.
