= 1997 FINA Short Course World Championships – Women's 200m backstroke =

The finals and the qualifying heats of the women's 200 metres backstroke event at the 1997 FINA Short Course World Championships were held on the last day of the competition, on Sunday 20 April 1997 in Gothenburg, Sweden.

== Finals ==
RANK	FINAL A	TIME
	Chen Yan (CHN)	2:07.50
	Misty Hyman (USA)	2:07.66
	Lia Oberstar (USA)	2:08.29
4.	Antje Buschschulte (GER)	2:08.77
5.	Sabine Herbst (GER)	2:10.39
6.	Joanne Deakins (GBR)	2:10.61
7.	Tomoko Hagiwara (JPN)	2:11.56
8.	Meredith Smith (AUS)	2:12.09

RANK	FINAL B	TIME
9.	Camilla Johansson (SWE)	2:10.80
10.	Lisa Virgini (CAN)	2:11.80
11.	Dyana Calub (AUS)	2:13.84
12.	Zoe Cray (GBR)	2:14.33
13.	Marcela Kubalčíková (CZE)	2:14.78
14.	Charlene Wittstock (RSA)	2:14.95
15.	Anna Kopachenia (BLR)	2:15.09
16.	Alenka Kejžar (SLO)	2:17.42

== Qualifying heats ==
RANK	HEATS RANKING	TIME
1.	Misty Hyman (USA)	2:09.13
2.	Lia Oberstar (USA)	2:09.40
3.	Sabine Herbst (GER)	2:09.72
4.	Chen Yan (CHN)	2:09.87
5.	Antje Buschschulte (GER)	2:10.03
6.	Tomoko Hagiwara (JPN)	2:10.68
7.	Joanne Deakins (GBR)	2:10.89
8.	Meredith Smith (AUS)	2:11.03
9.	Lisa Virgini (CAN)	2:11.11
10.	Camilla Johansson (SWE)	2:11.52
11.	Francesca Bissoli (ITA)	2:11.96
12.	Dyana Calub (AUS)	2:14.11
13.	Zoe Cray (GBR)	2:14.26
14.	Anna Kopachenia (BLR)	2:14.44
15.	Marcela Kubalčíková (CZE)	2:14.45
16.	Charlene Wittstock (RSA)	2:14.46
17.	Alenka Kejžar (SLO)	2:15.63
18.	Alena Nyvltová (CZE)	2:16.09
19.	Olga Kochetkova (RUS)	2:16.34
20.	Eydis Konradsdottir (ISL)	2:16.40
21.	Michelle Cruz (CAN)	2:16.47
22.	Chonlathorn Vorathamrong (THA)	2:19.41

== See also ==
- 1996 Women's Olympic Games 200m Backstroke
- 1997 Women's European LC Championships 200m Backstroke
