= Alexandru Țăruș =

Romania international rugby union player

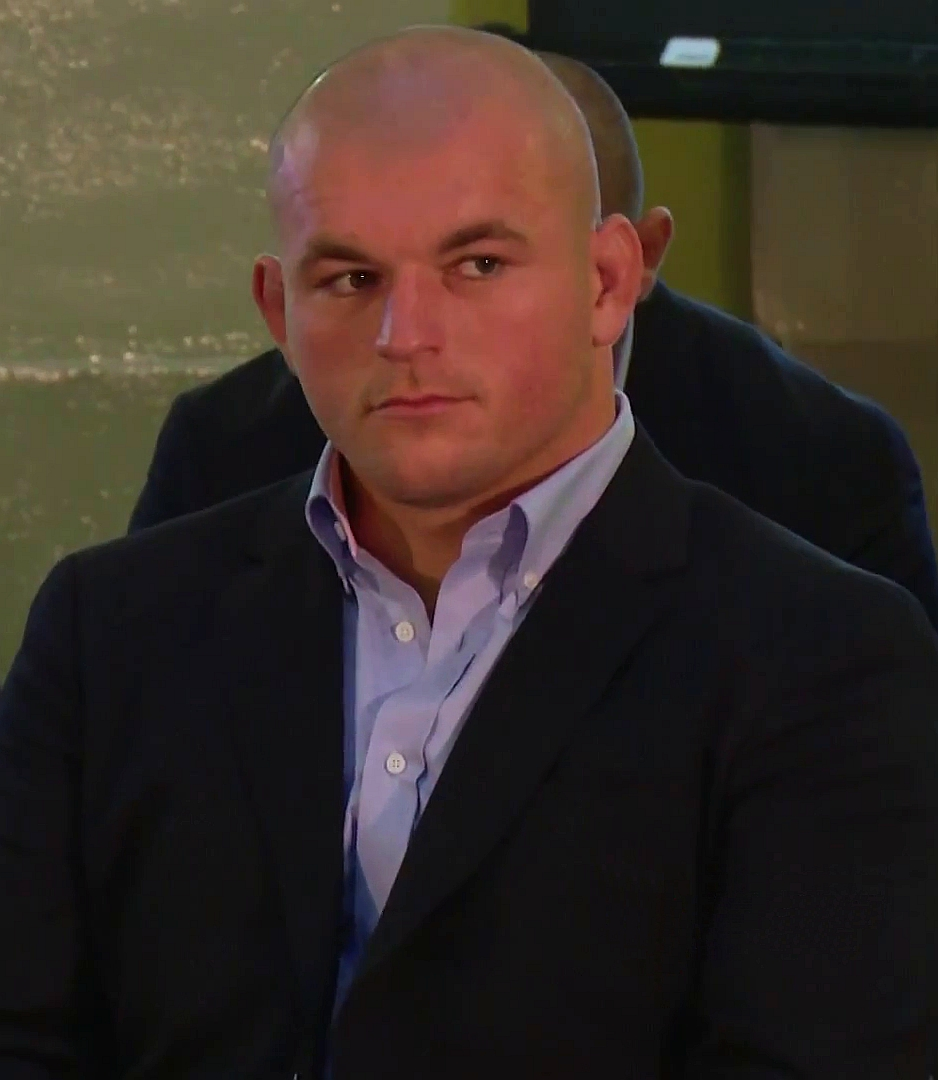
- Țăruș during a press conference before departing for the 2015 Rugby World Cup
- Born: Alexandru Mihai Țăruș; 9 May 1989 (age 37) Braşov, Romania
- Height: 6 ft 0.4 in (1.84 m)
- Weight: 275 lb (19 st 9 lb; 125 kg)

Rugby union career
- Position: Prop
Amateur team(s)
Years	Team	Apps	(Points)
- RC Braşov
Senior career
Years	Team	Apps	(Points)
2010–2011	Steaua București	0	(0)
2011−2012	CSU Aurel Vlaicu Arad		
2012–2015	Timișoara Saracens	41	(0)
2013–2014	→București Wolves	6	(0)
2015–2017	Béziers	42	(15)
2017–2019	Sale Sharks	34	(5)
2019−2021	Zebre	16	(0)
2021−2023	Rouen	13	(0)
2023-	SCM Timisoara	0	(0)
- Correct as of 18 Feb 2022
International career
Years	Team	Apps	(Points)
2009	Romania Under 20	4	(0)
2013–	Romania	39	(0)
- Correct as of 3 July 2021

Alexandru Mihai Țăruș (born 9 May 1989) is a Romanian rugby union footballer. He plays as a prop and he currently plays for SCM Timisoara

He was formed as a player at RC Braşov. As a junior player he won the Junior World Cup (2009) with the National U20 Team in Kenya. He played for RC Timişoara in the Romanian Rugby Championship.

After playing for Romania Under 20 in 2009, from 2013 Tarus was named in the Romania squad. He has 9 caps for Romania, since his debut at the 30-8 win over Argentina Jaguars in Bucharest at 12 June 2013, for the IRB Nations Cup. He was called for the 2015 Rugby World Cup, playing in two games as a substitute but without scoring. He still has to score his first international points.

On 10 April 2017, Țăruș travels to England to join Aviva Premiership side Sale Sharks on a two-year contract ahead of the 2017-18 season.

On 15 April 2019, Tarus left Sale Sharks to join Italian club Zebre in the Pro14 from the 2019-20 season to 2020-21 season.

In 2023 Țăruș returned in the Liga Națională de Rugby at his former team, SCM Timișoara.
