= Grozdanić =

Grozdanić is a surname. Notable people with the surname include:

- Dino Grozdanić (born 2002), Croatian professional footballer
- Emin Grozdanic (born 1999), Swedish footballer
- Maja Grozdanić (born 1981), Serbian swimmer
