= Duda-Epureni =

- Commune
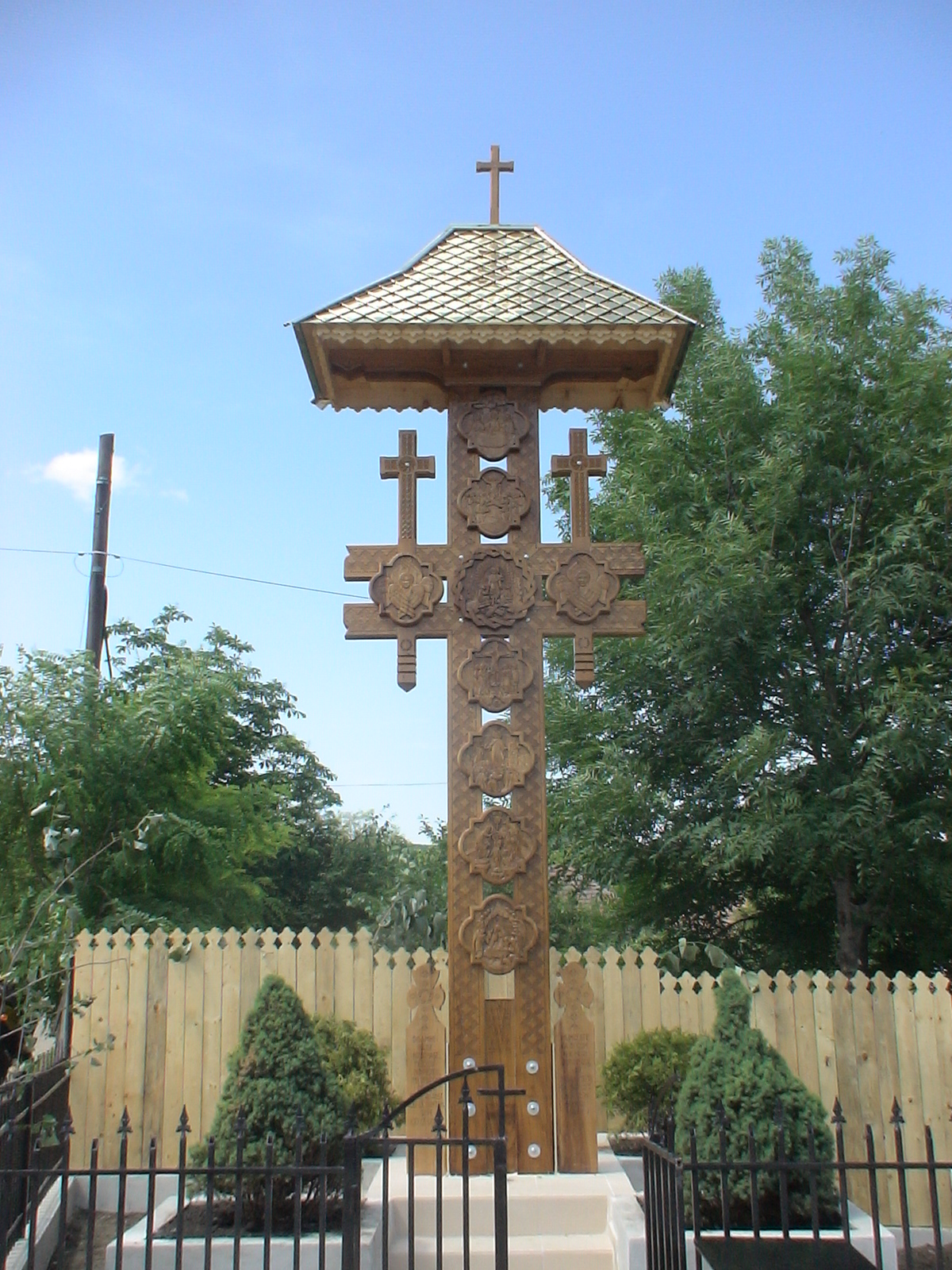
- Wayside cross in Epureni

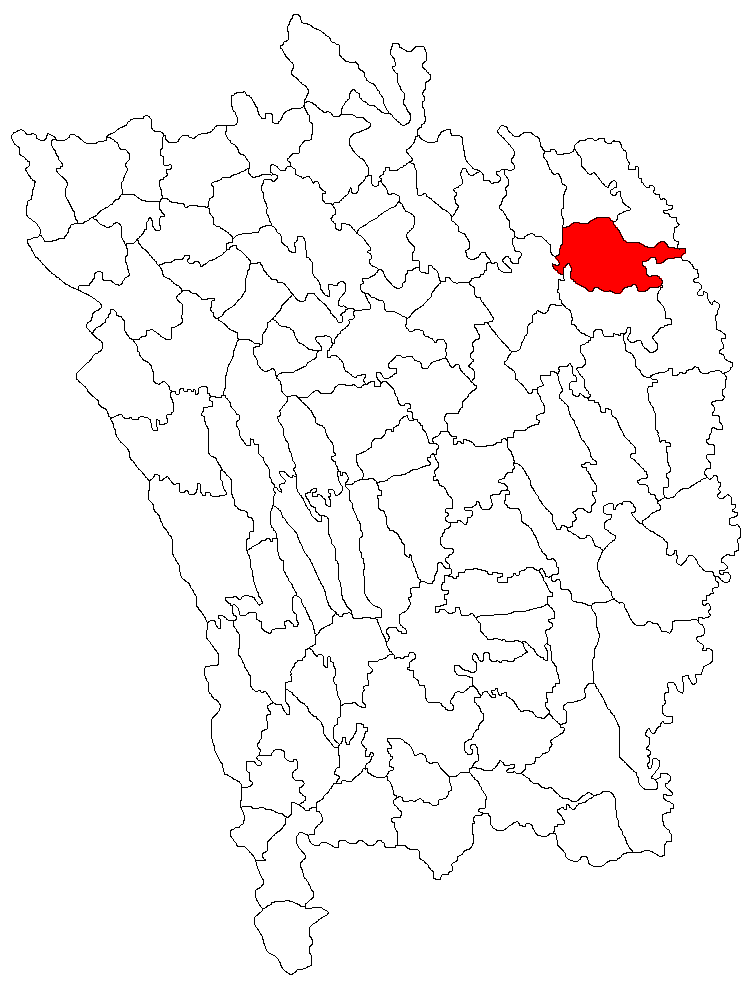
- Location in Vaslui County

- Location in Romania
- Coordinates: 46°42′19″N 28°01′54″E
- Country: Romania
- County: Vaslui
- Subdivisions: Bobești, Duda, Epureni, Valea Grecului

Government
  - Mayor (2020–2024): Petrică Chiriac (PSD)
- Area: 74.04 km^{2} (28.59 sq mi)
- Elevation: 128 m (420 ft)
- Population (2021-12-01): 3,324
  - Density: 44.89/km^{2} (116.3/sq mi)
- Time zone: UTC+02:00 (EET)
  - Summer (DST): UTC+03:00 (EEST)
- Postal code: 737233
- Area code: +(40) 235
- Vehicle reg.: VS
- Website: duda-epureni.ro

Duda-Epureni is a commune in Vaslui County, Western Moldavia, Romania. It is composed of four villages: Bobești, Duda, Epureni (the commune centre), and Valea Grecului.

== Natives ==
- Vasile Aciobăniței (born 1924), sculptor
- Mircea Spătaru (1937–2011), sculptor and painter
- Cătălin Tănase (born 1962), biologist and academic
