= Roxana Maracineanu =

French politician and swimmer

- Roxana Mărăcineanu
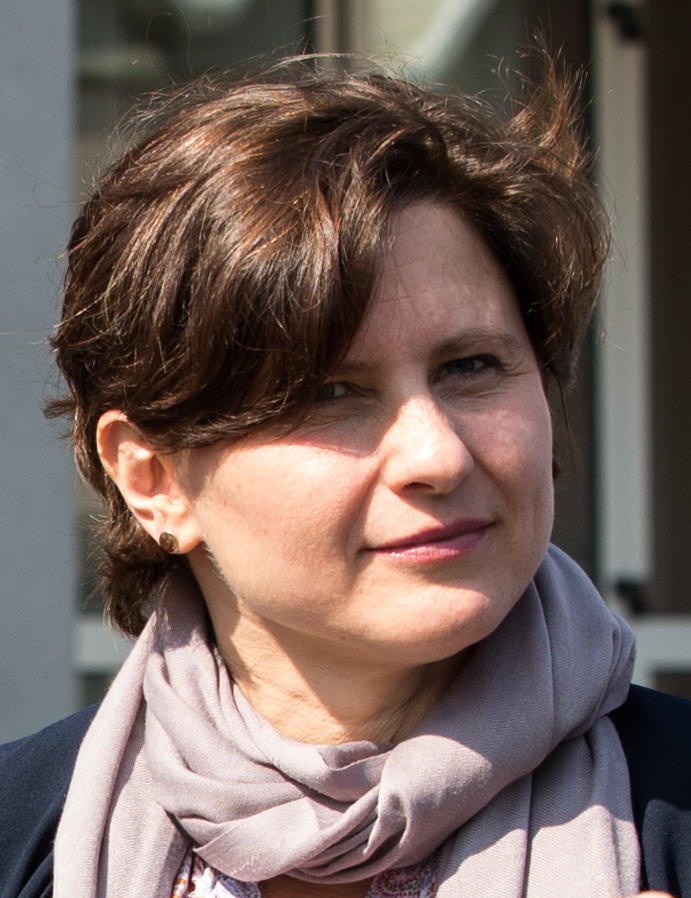
- Maracineanu in April 2019

Minister Delegate in charge of Sports
- In office 6 July 2020 – 20 May 2022
- Prime Minister: Jean Castex
- Preceded by: Office established

Minister of Sports
- In office 4 September 2018 – 6 July 2020
- Prime Minister: Édouard Philippe
- Preceded by: Laura Flessel
- Succeeded by: Jean-Michel Blanquer (National Education, Youth and Sports)

Personal details
- Born: 7 May 1975 (age 51) Bucharest, Romania
- Citizenship: French; Romanian
- Spouse: Franck Ballanger
- Children: 3
- Sports career
- Height: 1.65 m (5 ft 5 in)
- Sport: Swimming
- Strokes: Backstroke
- Club: Mulhouse Olympic Nautique
Medal record
Women's swimming
Representing France
Olympic Games
Silver medal – second place	2000 Sydney	200 m backstroke
World Championships (LC)
Gold medal – first place	1998 Perth	200 m backstroke
European Championships (LC)
Gold medal – first place	1999 Istanbul	200 m backstroke
Silver medal – second place	1997 Seville	100 m backstroke
Bronze medal – third place	1997 Seville	200 m backstroke
Bronze medal – third place	1999 Istanbul	100 m backstroke
Mediterranean Games
Gold medal – first place	1997 Bari	100 m backstroke

Roxana Maracineanu (Romanian pronunciation: [rokˈsana mərətʃiˈne̯anu]; born 7 May 1975) is a Romanian-French politician, former swimming champion and television consultant who served as Minister Delegate in charge of Sports in the government of Prime Minister Jean Castex (2020–2022) and as Minister of Sports under Édouard Philippe (2018–2022).

Born in Romania, Maracineanu moved to France as a child, acquiring the citizenship via naturalisation at age 16. An accomplished swimmer Maracineanu became the first French world swimming champion in January 1998. She won silver medal in the 200 m backstroke at the 2000 Summer Olympics in Sydney. She entered politics in 2010 with the Socialist Party by being elected regional councillor of Île-de-France, a mandate she held until 2015.

She was the Ensemble candidate in Val-de-Marne's 7th constituency in the 2022 French legislative election, but lost out to Rachel Keke from NUPES.

== Family and childhood ==
Born in Bucharest, Romania as Roxana Mărăcineanu, she practiced gymnastics as a child. Her father, thanks to a contract of cooperation, went to work in Algeria, taking his family. They then moved to France in 1984 where they asked for asylum to flee the Ceauşescu regime. It was in Blois, in a transit center, that she learned French. She went to secondary school at Jean Macé College in Mulhouse. She was naturalized French in 1991 at the age of 16 years.

She graduated from ESCP Europe in 2005 and has a master's degree in English and German.

== Sporting career ==
Representing the Mulhouse Olympic Swimming team, whose coach was Lionel Horter, Maracineanu won her first French national title in 100 meters and 200 meters at the 1991 summer championships.

In Seville, at the 1997 European Championships, she was beaten by Germany's Antje Buschschulte in the 100 meters back and third in the 200-meter backstroke, behind Germany's Cathleen Rund and Antje Buschschulte.

At the 1998 Worlds Championships in Perth, she began her competition with a sixth place finish in the 100m backstroke, won by Lea Maurer. Before the 200-meter final, her coach Lionel Horter assures her that if she leads the 150-meter race, she will win the race. First in front of Germany's Dagmar Hase, she becomes the first French world swimming champion.

In October 2004, she announced her retirement two months after Laure Manaudou's 400m triumph at the Athens Olympics. She had been a childhood idol of Manaudou's, having sent a letter to her in her youth.

== Sports consultant and other activities ==
=== Consultant ===
In March 2007, at the World Swimming Championships in Melbourne, she was a consultant for France Télévisions alongside Alexandre Boyon and Michel Rousseau, and for L'Équipe TV. Since the 2008 Olympic Games in Beijing, she has been a consultant on the public group and on Europe 1. She renewed this collaboration for the 2009 World Championships in Rome, the 2010 World Short Course Championships in Dubai, the 2010 European Championships in Budapest, at the 2012 Olympic Games in London.

At the 2014 European Championships, Frédérick Bousquet, injured, was a consultant to Maracineanu, Alexandre Boyon and Nelson Monfort. For the next major competition, at the 2015 Kazan World Championships, the France Télévisions group, wishing to reform the duo Philippe Lucas and Laure Manaudou, did not renew her contract.

In 2009, she received the Sports Commentator Award from the Association of Sports Writers. It rewards "a journalist, professional, audiovisual commentator, with the appreciated knowledge and the judgment which, in its interventions on the sport, will be expressed with the constant concern to respect the rules of the French language".

=== Candidate at the FFN ===
With the resignation of Lionel Horter from the position of National Technical Director, the French Swimming Federation, she was. In 2015, she was among the last three candidates of a replacement list established by the Ministry of Sports. The post was finally awarded to Jacques Favre.

=== Volunteering ===
Maracineanu took part in the program "Eat well, it's well played!" launched in 2005 by the Sports Foundation. She was also involved in the production of videos aimed at young athletes to teach them the basics of a diet adapted to physical effort, as part of a program of the Sports Foundation sensitizing children to the importance of physical activity.

== Political career ==
=== Regional Councilor ===
A candidate on the list of the Socialist Party, she was elected to the regional council of Île-de-France on 21 March 2010 and joined the sports and leisure commission. Her mandate ended with the renewal of the Regional Council on 13 December 2015.

=== Minister of Sports ===
In July 2018 Prime Minister Édouard Philippe asked her to participate in an interministerial mission (between Education and Sports) to find ways to improve swimming in France's primary schools.

On 4 September 2018, Maracineanu was appointed Minister of Sports in the Philippe Government, replacing Laura Flessel.

In January 2020, Maracineanu successfully forced the resignation of Didier Gailhaguet, the president of the French Federation of Ice Sports, over what she considered his failure to appropriately handle sexual abuse allegations within the sport of figure skating, following allegations by retired pairs skater Sarah Abitbol against her former coach Gilles Beyer, a Gailhaguet ally. Maracineanu subsequently ordered a broad investigation of sexual abuse in French sporting culture that resulted in over 400 individuals being accused of wrongdoing.

=== Minister delegate in charge of Sports ===
On 6 July 2020, following the appointment of Jean Castex as the new French Prime Minister and a cabinet reshuffle, Maracineanu became Minister delegate in charge of Sports, attached to the Minister of National Education, Youth and Sport, Jean-Michel Blanquer.

== Orders and awards ==
- National Order of Merit (France)
- Legion of Honour (France)
- Sports Commentator Award 2009
