= Ximena Escalera =

Bolivian swimmer

Personal information
- Born: 6 January 1980 (age 45)

Sport
- Sport: Swimming

Ximena Escalera (born 6 January 1980) is a Bolivian swimmer.

== Olympics career ==
She competed in the women's 100 metre backstroke at the 1996 Summer Olympics.
