= Nicolas Tryzna =

French politician (born 1987)

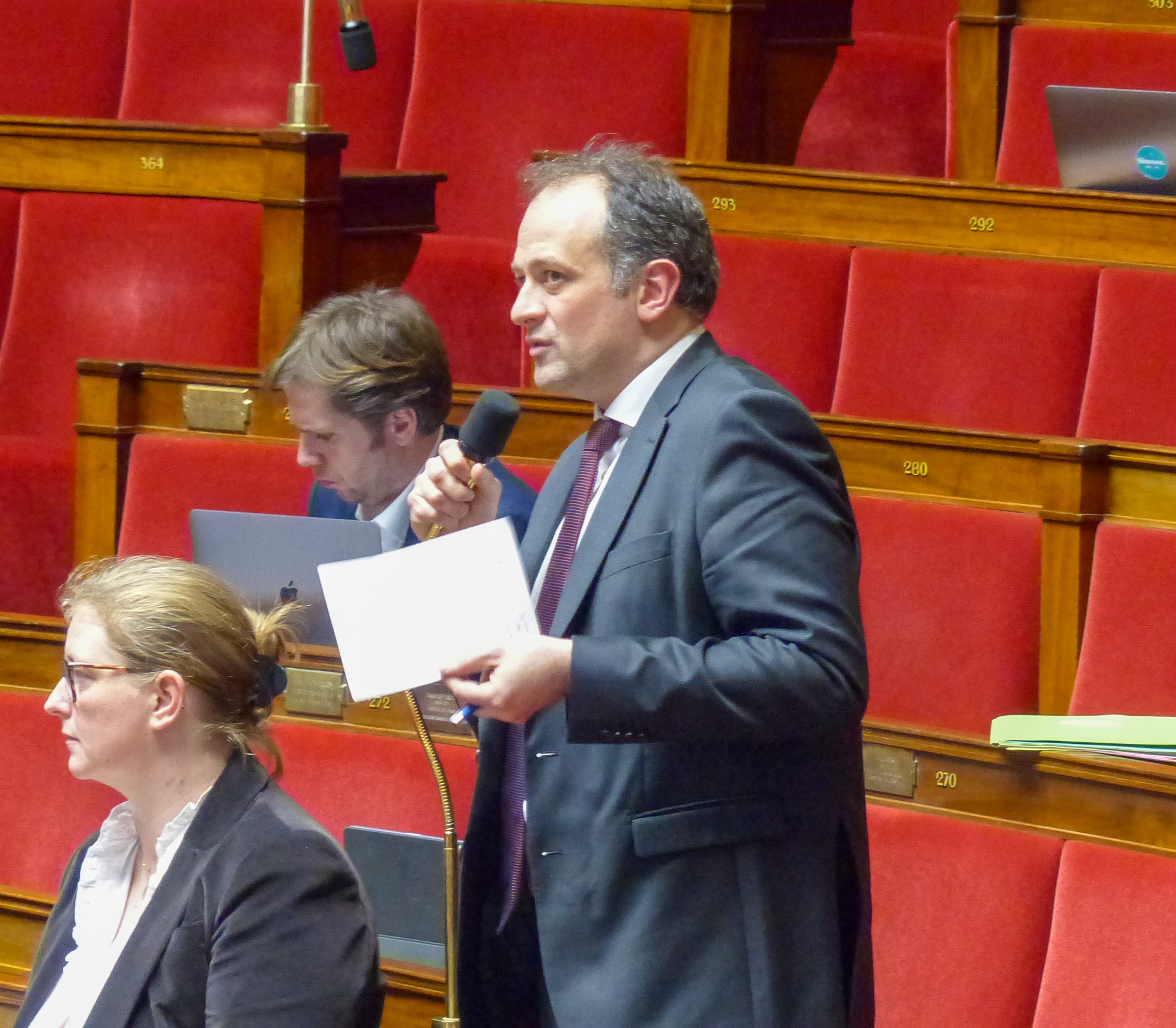

Member of the French National Assembly for Val-de-Marne's 7th constituency
- Incumbent
- Assumed office 13 November 2025
- Preceded by: Vincent Jeanbrun

Personal details
- Born: 15 December 1987 (age 38)
- Party: Independent
- Other political affiliations: Republican Right group

Nicolas Tryzna (born 15 December 1987) is a French politician serving as a member of the National Assembly since 2025. He has been a member of the Departmental Council of Val-de-Marne since 2017.
