= Cătălin Beca =

Romania international rugby union player

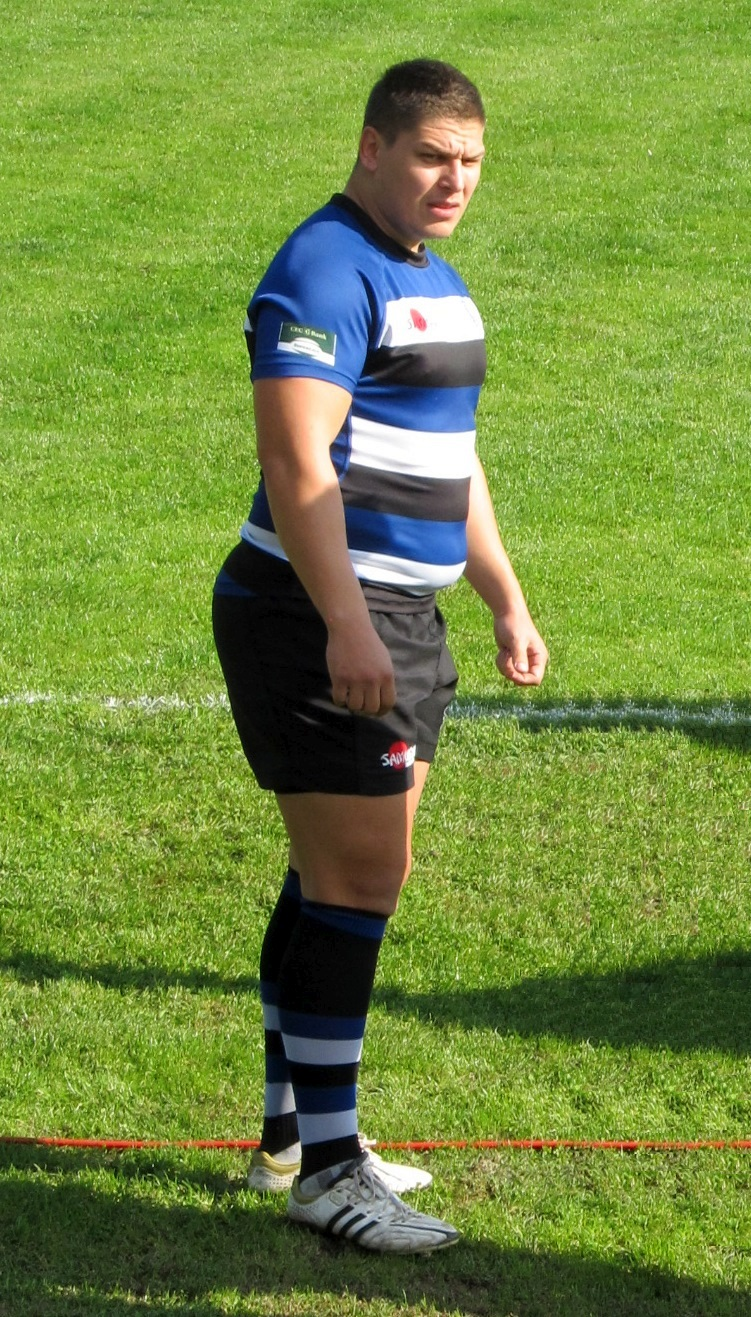
- Cătălin Beca Playing for CSM București during a SuperLiga match in 2015
- Full name: Dumitru Cătălin Beca
- Born: 26 March 1985 (age 41) Romania
- Height: 1.83 m (6 ft 0 in)
- Weight: 88 kg (13 st 12 lb; 194 lb)

Rugby union career
- Position: Hooker
- Current team: Not attached
Senior career
Years	Team	Apps	(Points)
- Dinamo București
2010	Aurel Vlaicu Arad		
2013–14	Steaua București	2	(5)
2014–16	CSM București	21	(0)
2016	Dinamo București	6	(5)
- Correct as of 2 March 2020
Provincial / State sides
Years	Team	Apps	(Points)
2004–14	București Wolves	13	(0)
- Correct as of 2 March 2020
International career
Years	Team	Apps	(Points)
2009–11	Romania	6	(0)
- Correct as of 2 March 2020

Dumitru Cătălin Beca (born 26 March 1985) is a Romanian rugby union football player. He most recently played as a hooker for professional SuperLiga club Dinamo București.

== Club career ==
During his career, Cătălin Beca played mostly for Dinamo București and for a short period for CSU Aurel Vlaicu, Steaua București and CSM București, all in Romanian SuperLiga.

== International career ==
Beca is also selected for Romania's national team, the Oaks, making his international debut during the 2009 season of European Nations Cup First Division in a test match against the Los Leones.
