= Swimming at the 1996 Summer Olympics – Women's 100 metre backstroke =

Women's 100 metre backstroke at the Games of the XXVI Olympiad
- Venue: Georgia Tech Aquatic Center
- Date: 22 July 1996 (heats & finals)
- Competitors: 36 from 30 nations
- Winning time: 1:01.19

Medalists
| 1st place, gold medalist(s) | | Beth Botsford | United States |
| 2nd place, silver medalist(s) | | Whitney Hedgepeth | United States |
| 3rd place, bronze medalist(s) | | Marianne Kriel | South Africa |

The women's 100 metre backstroke event at the 1996 Summer Olympics took place on 22 July at the Georgia Tech Aquatic Center in Atlanta, United States.

== Records ==
Prior to this competition, the existing world and Olympic records were as follows.

| World record | He Cihong (CHN) | 1:00.16 | Rome, Italy | 10 September 1994 |
| Olympic record | Krisztina Egerszegi (HUN) | 1:00.68 | Barcelona, Spain | 28 July 1992 |

== Results ==
=== Heats ===
Rule: The eight fastest swimmers advance to final A (Q), while the next eight to final B (q).

| Rank | Heat | Lane | Name | Nationality | Time | Notes |
|---|---|---|---|---|---|---|
| 1 | 5 | 4 | Whitney Hedgepeth | United States | 1:01.70 | Q |
| 2 | 5 | 5 | Beth Botsford | United States | 1:02.00 | Q |
| 3 | 4 | 3 | Marianne Kriel | South Africa | 1:02.33 | Q, AF |
| 4 | 4 | 5 | Mai Nakamura | Japan | 1:02.35 | Q |
| 5 | 3 | 5 | Nicole Stevenson | Australia | 1:02.50 | Q |
| 6 | 3 | 3 | Chen Yan | China | 1:02.62 | Q |
| 7 | 3 | 2 | Antje Buschschulte | Germany | 1:02.68 | Q |
| 8 | 4 | 4 | Miki Nakao | Japan | 1:02.90 | Q |
| 9 | 3 | 4 | Nina Zhivanevskaya | Russia | 1:02.94 | q |
| 10 | 5 | 7 | Anke Scholz | Germany | 1:03.05 | q |
| 11 | 5 | 3 | Mette Jacobsen | Denmark | 1:03.14 | q, WD |
| 12 | 4 | 6 | Olga Kochetkova | Russia | 1:03.17 | q |
| 13 | 4 | 7 | Lydia Lipscombe | New Zealand | 1:03.61 | q |
| 14 | 4 | 2 | Therese Alshammar | Sweden | 1:03.79 | q |
| 15 | 5 | 6 | Julie Howard | Canada | 1:03.84 | q |
| 16 | 5 | 6 | Elli Overton | Australia | 1:03.88 | q |
| 17 | 5 | 1 | Helen Slatter | Great Britain | 1:03.89 | q |
| 18 | 2 | 4 | Lee Ji-hyun | South Korea | 1:03.96 | NR |
| 19 | 3 | 7 | Hélène Ricardo | France | 1:04.03 | |
| 20 | 3 | 1 | Eva Piñera | Spain | 1:04.41 | |
| 21 | 2 | 3 | Praphalsai Minpraphal | Thailand | 1:04.61 | NR |
| 22 | 5 | 8 | Maria Santos | Portugal | 1:04.84 | |
| 23 | 4 | 8 | Anu Koivisto | Finland | 1:05.25 | |
| 24 | 2 | 7 | Marcela Kubalčíková | Czech Republic | 1:05.48 | |
| 25 | 2 | 1 | Yseult Gervy | Belgium | 1:05.72 | |
| 26 | 3 | 6 | He Cihong | China | 1:05.87 | |
| 27 | 2 | 2 | Aikaterini Klepkou | Greece | 1:05.94 | |
| 28 | 2 | 5 | Florina Herea | Romania | 1:06.12 | |
| 28 | 2 | 6 | Akiko Thomson | Philippines | 1:06.12 | |
| 30 | 3 | 8 | Valeria Álvarez | Argentina | 1:06.38 | |
| 31 | 4 | 1 | Dagmara Komorowicz | Poland | 1:06.70 | |
| 32 | 1 | 4 | Annamária Kiss | Hungary | 1:07.38 | |
| 33 | 1 | 6 | Gail Rizzo | Malta | 1:07.61 | |
| 34 | 2 | 8 | Tsai Shu-min | Chinese Taipei | 1:11.44 | |
| 35 | 1 | 3 | Ximena Escalera | Bolivia | 1:11.70 | |
| 36 | 1 | 5 | Harijesy Razafindramahatra | Madagascar | 1:13.83 | |

=== Finals ===
==== Final B ====
| Rank | Lane | Name | Nationality | Time | Notes |
|---|---|---|---|---|---|
| 9 | 4 | Nina Zhivanevskaya | Russia | 1:02.38 | |
| 10 | 5 | Anke Scholz | Germany | 1:02.85 | |
| 11 | 6 | Lydia Lipscombe | New Zealand | 1:03.30 | |
| 12 | 3 | Olga Kochetkova | Russia | 1:03.52 | |
| 13 | 8 | Helen Slatter | Great Britain | 1:03.61 | |
| 14 | 7 | Elli Overton | Australia | 1:03.69 | |
| 15 | 2 | Julie Howard | Canada | 1:04.01 | |
| 16 | 1 | Therese Alshammar | Sweden | 1:04.15 | |

==== Final A ====
| Rank | Lane | Name | Nationality | Time | Notes |
|---|---|---|---|---|---|
| 1st place, gold medalist(s) | 5 | Beth Botsford | United States | 1:01.19 | |
| 2nd place, silver medalist(s) | 4 | Whitney Hedgepeth | United States | 1:01.47 | |
| 3rd place, bronze medalist(s) | 3 | Marianne Kriel | South Africa | 1:02.12 | AF |
| 4 | 6 | Mai Nakamura | Japan | 1:02.33 | |
| 5 | 7 | Chen Yan | China | 1:02.50 | |
| 6 | 1 | Antje Buschschulte | Germany | 1:02.52 | |
| 7 | 2 | Nicole Stevenson | Australia | 1:02.70 | |
| 8 | 8 | Miki Nakao | Japan | 1:02.78 | |
