= Dagmara Komorowicz =

Polish swimmer

Personal information
- Born: 1 May 1979 (age 47) Lublin, Poland

Sport
- Sport: Swimming

Dagmara Komorowicz (born 1 May 1979) is a Polish swimmer. She competed in the women's 100 metre backstroke at the 1996 Summer Olympics.
