= Cătălin Gogor =

Romanian footballer

Personal information
- Full name: Cătălin Gheorghe Gogor
- Date of birth: 27 May 2001 (age 25)
- Place of birth: Budești, Romania
- Height: 1.85 m (6 ft 1 in)
- Position: Left-back

Team information
- Current team: ASU Politehnica Timișoara
- Number: 14

Youth career
- –2021: FCSB

Senior career*
Years	Team	Apps	(Gls)
2021–2022	FCSB	1	(0)
2021	FCSB II	2	(0)
2021–2022	→ Unirea Constanța (loan)	14	(0)
2022	Gloria Băneasa		
2023	Cetatea Turnu Măgurele		
2023–2024	Mioveni	20	(1)
2024–2025	1599 Șelimbăr	20	(2)
2025–	ASU Politehnica Timișoara	14	(1)
- * Club domestic league appearances and goals as of 23 May 2026

Cătălin Gheorghe Gogor (born 27 May 2001) is a Romanian professional footballer who plays as a defender for Liga II club SCM Râmnicu Vâlcea.

== Honours ==
ASU Politehnica Timișoara

- Liga III: 2025–26
