= Dijana Kvesić =

Bosnian swimmer

Personal information
- Nationality: Bosnia and Herzegovina
- Born: 11 January 1977 (age 49) Sarajevo, Bosnia and Herzegovina, SFR Yugoslavia

Sport
- Sport: Swimming

Dijana Kvesić (born 11 January 1977) is a Bosnian swimmer. She competed in the women's 200 metre backstroke event at the 1996 Summer Olympics.
