= Cătălin Albu =

Romanian footballer

Personal information
- Full name: Andrei Cătălin Albu
- Date of birth: 3 June 2004 (age 22)
- Place of birth: Plenița, Romania
- Height: 1.79 m (5 ft 10 in)
- Position: Central midfielder

Team information
- Current team: FC U Craiova
- Number: 18

Youth career
- –2020: Gheorghe Hagi Academy
- 2020–2023: FC U Craiova

Senior career*
Years	Team	Apps	(Gls)
2022–	FC U Craiova	4	(0)
2023–2024	→ Filiași (loan)	7	(0)
2024	→ Oltul Curtișoara (loan)		
- * Club domestic league appearances and goals as of 27 October 2024

Andrei Cătălin Albu (born 3 June 2004) is a Romanian professional footballer who plays as a central midfielder for Liga II club FC U Craiova.

== Club career ==
=== FC U Craiova 1948 ===
He made his league debut on 16 May 2022 in Liga I match against Sepsi OSK.
