= Cătălin Teniță =

Romanian entrepreneur and civic activist

Cătălin Dragoș Teniță
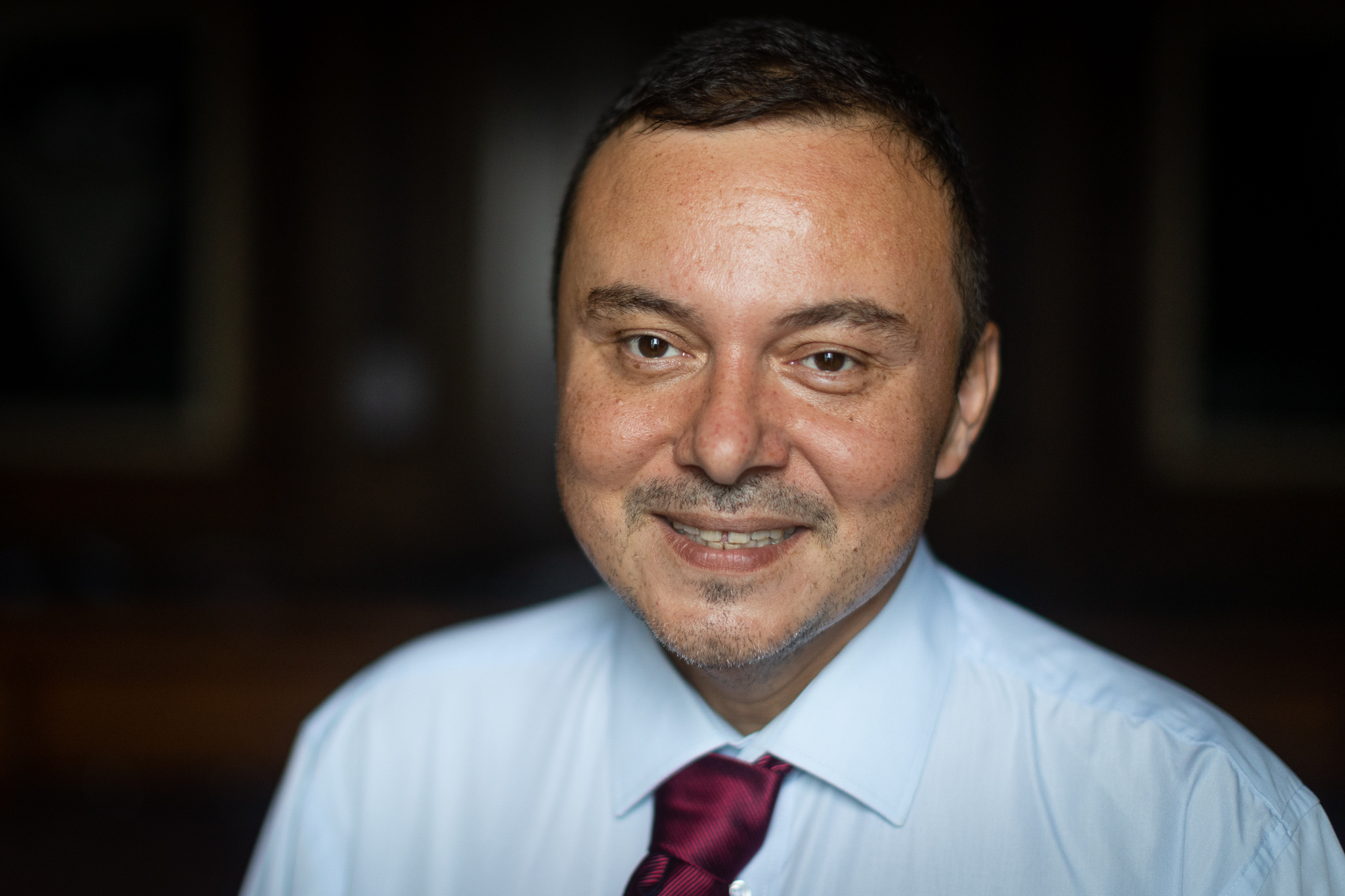
- Born: October 4, 1977 (age 49); Bucharest, Socialist Republic of Romania
- Citizenship: Romanian

Academic background
- Education: University of Bucharest

Academic work
- Discipline: Politics, Digital marketing, Media activism, Digital citizenship
- Institutions: Parliament of Romania
- Awards: Eisenhower Fellow
- Website: catalin-tenita.ro

Cătălin Dragoș Teniță (Romanian pronunciation: [kətəˈlin teˈnit͡sə]; born 4 October 1977 in Bucharest, Romania) is a Romanian politician serving as a member of the Romanian Parliament, Chamber of Deputies since December 2020.

Before December 2020 he was a digital entrepreneur and civic activist. He was a founder of Treeworks, Zelist Monitor, and Geeks for Democracy, a specialist in online communication and digital communities, and he was an Eisenhower Fellow 2020.

== Early life ==
In 1996 he graduated from the Spiru Haret National College. In 2000 he graduated from the Law School of the University of Bucharest.

Between 1995 and 1997 he was co-editor and translator at the Jurnalul SF, and a translator for various Romanian publishing houses.

In the spring of 2002, together with two high school classmates, he founded TreeWorks, an I.T. company, and was the company's managing partner until the election as Romanian MP.

== Political activity ==
In January 2020, Tenita announced his transition from civil society to politics, becoming a member of the Freedom, Unity and Solidarity Party(PLUS) and being elected as a member of the Chamber of Deputies of Romania in the December 2020 parliamentary elections, representing the Bucharest constituency.

In September 2022, Tenita left USR due to differences in opinion regarding transparency and internal democracy, joining the REPER Party, founded by Members of the European Parliament [Dacian Cioloș], [Dragoș Pîslaru], [Ramona Strugariu], [Dragoș Tudorache], and [Alin Mituța]. Tenita is a member of the National Bureau of the REPER Party and co-chair of the Bucharest branch.

=== No Convicted Criminals on the Ballot Act ===
In June 2021, following dialogue with the Save the Children-Romania NGO, Tenita drafted and submitted as a co-initiator the legislative proposal (PL-x no. 535/2021) to amend the electoral legislation. This proposal sought to prohibit individuals convicted of serious crimes against children (crimes against life, freedom, and sexual integrity, human trafficking or exploitation, and mistreatment of minors) from participating in parliamentary and local elections.

Following political negotiations, the scope of the legislative proposal was expanded, leading to the transformation of this project into two laws (Law 294/2022 and Law 295/2022). These laws establish the prohibition of individuals sentenced to imprisonment from running in local and parliamentary elections, partially achieving the goal of the "No Criminals in Public Office" campaign.

=== The "Zero Tolerance for Sexual Harassment in Schools and Universities Act" (L430/2023) ===
==== Context and Initiation of the Project ====
Law No. 430/2023, known as the "Zero Tolerance for Sexual Harassment in Schools and Universities Act," was initiated following an alarming report presented in June 2023 by the FILIA association - one of Romania's oldest and most active non-profit associations for the protection of women's rights. This report, along with others, indicated that at least half of female students reported being asked for sexual favors during their studies. In response to this highly damaging situation for the psychological development of hundreds of thousands of young people, Deputy Teniță initiated the bill with the goal of amending the Penal Code. This project included extending the applicability of legislation on sexual harassment to include not only the professional environment (work relationships), but also the academic and university settings.

==== Specific Amendments to the Penal Code ====
The bill proposed adding a new paragraph to Article 299 of the Penal Code, which refers to "Abusive Use of Position for Sexual Purposes". The new regulation stipulated that, in cases where teaching staff in higher or secondary education commit sexual abuses against pupils or students, the special limits of the penalty will be increased by a third.

==== Adoption and Promulgation ====
The bill was voted on in the plenary session of the Chamber of Deputies on December 12, 2023, where it was approved by a large majority, recording only one abstention and 282 votes in favor. Subsequently, the law was promulgated by the President of Romania and entered into force as Law No. 430/2024.

=== Initiatives Regarding School Hot Meal Programs ===
Teniță supports of hot meals in schools, considering them one of the most effective tools for equalizing access to education. He believes these programs not only support the development of local economies but also provide greater economic autonomy for women. In 2021, Teniță proposed amendments to the ordinance on the pilot program, which were partially adopted by the Government. These were incorporated into the text of the ordinance approval law, as well as into subsequent annual ordinances.

In 2022, Teniță submitted a legislative project (Pl-x L735/2022) to restructure the European Union's School Program in Romania, known as "Cornul și laptele", into a modern program updated to the development level of Romanian society, focusing on healthy nutrition and nutritional education, named "Healthy Breakfast".

The legislative project received the Senate's vote (119 votes "for" and one abstention) and is currently under debate in the Chamber of Deputies, the decision-making body in this matter.

=== Initiatives for Supporting Libraries, Early Literacy, and Written Culture ===
Teniță started a legislative project to align the value-added tax for books, manuals, and electronic format publications to the level of those in printed format, namely 5%. This project was approved by both chambers of the Romanian Parliament, thus becoming Law 294/2021, which amends article 291, paragraph (3), letter a) of Law no. 227/2015 on the Fiscal Code.

Teniță started the legislative project (PL-x no. 634/2022) which allows for the redirection of 3.5% of the personal income tax to libraries, similar to the existing redirection options to non-profit organizations, religious denominations, or private scholarships. The legislative project has been endorsed by the Senate of Romania, but it is still under debate in the Chamber of Deputies.

Throughout his tenure, Teniță maintained ongoing dialogue with library and publishing representatives, supporting budget amendments for library funding and the renewal of book collections and digital equipment.

=== Initiatives Supporting the Ukrainian Cause and War Refugees Following the Russian Invasion on February 24, 2022 ===
In the months following Russia's invasion of Ukraine, Teniță submitted three significant legislative initiatives:

1. L213/2022 (submitted on March 1, 2022): A legislative proposal "Volunteers for Humanitarian Crises". This focuses on establishing social protection measures for those participating in volunteering activities in the context of humanitarian crises and/or disasters.

2. PL-x nr. 468/2022 (submitted on March 22, 2022): A legislative proposal to create a legal framework aimed at reducing the risk of human trafficking, particularly of women and refugee children. The initiative proposes the creation of a mechanism to prohibit individuals registered in the National Automated Registry for Sexual Offences, Exploitation of Persons, or Offences Against Minors from contacting these refugees, under the pretext of offering shelter or transport.

3. Pl-x nr. 412/2022 (submitted on April 11, 2022): A legislative proposal "Solidarity with Ukraine for banning the import and intra-community acquisitions of oil, natural gas, coal, and nuclear fuel from the Russian Federation during the unprovoked aggression against Ukraine"

=== International Affiliations and Representation ===
Cătălin Teniță is the founder and president of the Romanian branch of the European Parliamentary Forum for Sexual and Reproductive Rights (EPF). EPF operates in over 30 European countries' parliaments, as well as at the European Parliament level, focusing on promoting sexual and reproductive rights, reproductive health, gender equality, and human rights.

Under Teniță's leadership, the Romanian branch has held conferences and events addressing key issues like HPV vaccination, gender equality, and improved HIV patient care. In July 2023, Teniță was elected to EPF's executive committee, enabling greater influence in shaping and advocating European-level policies on health and sexual and reproductive rights. Teniță is also a member of the European Cancer Organisation.

Tenita has expressed support for the cause of Taiwan, calling on Romanian authorities to establish economic and academic relations, as most countries in the European Union have done, and has advocated for maintaining the status quo and peace in the Taiwan Strait. In March 2023, he made a parliamentary visit to Taipei, where he met with the president of Taiwan, Tsai Ing-wen, the Prime Minister, and other parliamentarians and ministers, thus becoming the first elected official from Romania to do so.

== Civic involvement ==
In the summer of 2016, he co-founded a civic affinity group called Geeks for Democracy, which became a non-profit association with legal personality in 2018. The purpose of this entity is to use the resources and know-how in the area of creative industries (I.T., communication, design) for civic actions.

Over time, Geeks for Democracy has carried out, either in its own name or in coalitions with other associations and groups, civic actions such as:

1. Every Vote Matters is the platform for recruiting and training the voting observers (in cooperation with ExpertForum, Funky Citizens, CIVICA Iasi, Ghepart, Electoral Observatory)
2. The Fund for Democracy – a donor community for civic startups and investigative journalism
3. Crowdfunded national opinion polls on political opinions on current issues (February 2017 – OUG 13/2017, January 2018 – socio-economic/political correlations, December 2018 – opinion Romanians on pardoning/amnesty for corruption offenses in relation to those of common law)
4. Our money – monitoring the public procurement in SEAP / SICAP
5. AtlasElectoral.eu – analysis of election results and presence
6. The Memorial of the Decree – a cross-media product of oral history type of the harmful consequences of Decree no. 770 of 1966 which established ruthless pronatalist policies
7. Creative actions to support the protests caused by the attacks on justice during 2017-2019, both offline (Victoriei Square ) and online (statulparalel.ro, mitingucujapca.ro)
8. New People in Politics – A Citizen Legislative Initiative to Reform Electoral Legislation to Simplify the Access of Competent Citizens in Politics
9. Actions of public commemoration of the heroes of the Romanian Revolution on its 29th anniversary, respectively 30th anniversary (2019)
10. Shopping at Your Door – an initiative to respond to the needs of the elderly or other risk categories in the COVID-19 crisis (a crowdsourced call-center and teams of volunteers for home delivery of food and medicine, as well as interventions of the mobile food bank in disadvantaged or quarantined communities).

In 2019 he was selected by Eisenhower Fellowships, Philadelphia as a Global Fellow 2020.

== Recognition ==
=== Awards ===
Year	Award	Category	Nominee(s)	Result	Ref.
2017	Romanian PR Award	non-profit campaign	Every Vote Matters	Won	
2017	Civil Society Gala	Civic Participation Category	Every Vote Matters	Won	
2018	Civil Society Gala	Civic Initiatives Category	The Fund for Democracy	Won	

=== Recognition and fellowships ===
Year	Award	Category	Nominee(s)	Result	Ref.
2017	CeRe Public Participation Awards	Special Award	Teniț@ and his Friends for Democracy	Won	
2017	Romanian PR Awards	Communicator of the Year	Cătălin Teniță	Won	
2018	U.S. State Department	International Visitors Leadership Program	Cătălin Teniță	Won	
2020	Eisenhower Fellowships	Global Fellow	Cătălin Teniță	Won	

== Publications ==
- Pierdut în timp (The Timeships, volume I) by Stephen Baxter, Nemira Publishing House, 1999, ISBN 973-569-396-8, translated in Romanian by Cătălin Teniță
- Corăbiile timpului (The Timeships, volume II) by Stephen Baxter, Nemira Publishing House, 2001, ISBN 973-569-428-X, translated in Romanian by Cătălin Teniță
- Ion Luca Caragiale Virtual Encyclopedia - editors: Remus Cernea, Gabriela Bagrinovschi, and Cătălin Teniță, published by Noesis Cultural Society, Bucharest, 2002
- Constantin Brâncuși Virtual Encyclopedia - editors: Remus Cernea, Gabriela Bagrinovschi and Cătălin Teniță, published by Noesis Cultural Society, Bucharest, 2003
- Nichita Stănescu Virtual Encyclopedia - editors: Remus Cernea, Gabriela Bagrinovschi, and Cătălin Teniță, published by Noesis Cultural Society, Bucharest, 2004
- "Searching the PR relevancy in the Social Media Age" published in The Golden Book of Romanian Public Relations, editor Dana Oancea, Forum for International Communications, Bucuresti, 2017, ISBN 978-973-0-25583-6
- "Cine sunt tefeliștii. Și de ce le este lor frica?" in Vă Vedem by Ramona Ursu, Humanitas Publishing House, 2018, ISBN 978-973-50-6133-3
- "Statul paralel al vrăjitorilor, zeilor și șobolanilor" in Statul Paralel by Ramona Ursu, Humanitas Publishing House, 2019, ISBN 978-973-50-6609-3
- "Povestind cu Ursula" in Scena 9, 2018,
- The step by step Revolution, in The Wilson Quarterly, Winter 2020
