= Val-de-Marne's 7th constituency =

Constituency of the National Assembly of France

7th constituency of Val-de-Marne
- inline Constituency of the National Assembly of France

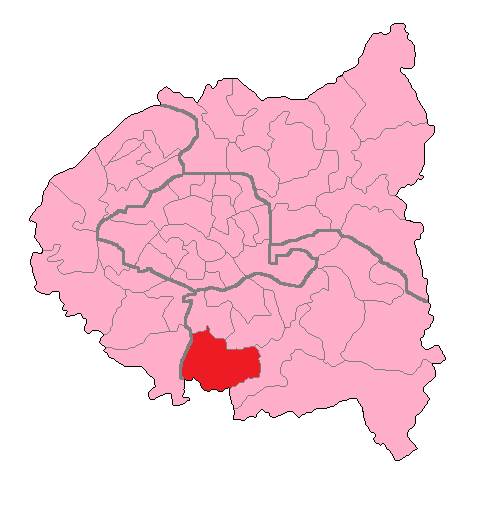
- Val-de-Marne's 7th Constituency shown within Île-de-France
- Deputy: Vincent Jeanbrun; Republicans
- Department: Val-de-Marne
- Cantons: Chevilly-Larue - Fresnes - L'Haÿ-les-Roses - Thiais
- Registered voters: 63,664

The 7th constituency of Val-de-Marne is a French legislative constituency in the Val-de-Marne département.

== Description ==
The 7th constituency of Val-de-Marne was moved entirely as a result of the 2010 redistricting of French legislative constituencies and now covers the same territory as the old 12th Constituency of Val-de-Marne. The seat occupies the south west corner of the department.

Because of these boundary changes historical comparisons can not be made with the old 7th Constituency. The old 12th Constituency of Val-de-Marne elected a UMP deputy at the 2002 and the 2007 elections.

== Historic Representation ==
Election	Member	Party
1967	Robert-André Vivien	UDR
1968	Robert-André Vivien	UDR
1973	Robert-André Vivien	UDR
1978	Robert-André Vivien	RPR
1981	Robert-André Vivien	RPR
1986	Proportional representation – no election by constituency	
1988	Roland Nungesser	RPR
1993	Roland Nungesser	RPR
1997	Pierre Aubry	RPR
2002	Marie-Anne Montchamp	UMP
2004	Olivier Dosne	UMP
2005	Marie-Anne Montchamp	UMP
2007	Marie-Anne Montchamp	UMP
2012	Jean-Jacques Bridey	PS
2017	Jean-Jacques Bridey	LREM
2022	Rachel Keke	LFI
2024	Vincent Jeanbrun	LR

== Election results ==
=== 2024 ===
Candidate	Party	Alliance	First round			Second round		
Candidate	Party	Alliance	Votes	%	+/–	Votes	%	+/–
Rachel Keke	LFI	NFP	18,736	43.65	+6.43	20,088	49.33	
Vincent Jeanbrun	LR		14,869	34.64	+16.32	20,633	50.67	
Claude Ledion	RN		8,111	18.89	+9.40			
Claire Maury	LO		623	1.45	-0.04			
Florence de la Ruelle	REC		493	1.15	-2.59			
Rachel Castin	EXD		95	0.22	N/A			
Valid votes			42,927	97.74	-0.33	40,721	96.16	
Blank votes			716	1.63	+0.21	1,239	2.93	
Null votes			278	0.63	+0.12	387	0.91	
Turnout			43,921	65.76	+19.43	42,347	63.38	
Abstentions			22,869	34.24	-19.43	24,464	36.62	
Registered voters			66,790			66,811		
Source: Ministry of the Interior, Le Monde
Result						LR GAIN OVER LFI		

=== 2022 ===
Legislative Election 2022: Val-de-Marne's 7th constituency
Party	Candidate	Votes	%	±%
LFI (NUPÉS)	Rachel Keke	11,200	37.22	+8.51
LREM (Ensemble)	Roxana Maracineanu	7,153	23.77	-13.39
LR (UDC)	Vincent Jeanbrun	5,514	18.32	−4.14
RN	Ugo Iannuzzi	2,856	9.49	+2.04
REC	Noël Nadal	1,125	3.74	N/A
DIV	El-Mehdi Lemaanni	1,100	3.66	N/A
DVE	Pascale Corbin	690	2.29	N/A
Others	N/A	457		
Turnout		30,689	46.33	−1.55
2nd round result
LFI (NUPÉS)	Rachel Keke	14,663	50.30	N/A
LREM (Ensemble)	Roxana Maracineanu	14,486	49.70	−3.00
Turnout		29,149	46.34	+6.71
LFI gain from LREM				

=== 2017 ===
Legislative Election 2017: Val-de-Marne's 7th constituency
Party	Candidate	Votes	%	±%
LREM	Jean-Jacques Bridey	11,451	37.16	N/A
LR	Vincent Jeanbrun	6,923	22.46	−10.48
PCF	Nora Lamraoui Boudon	5,070	16.45	+6.22
FN	Karine Haccart	2,297	7.45	−1.99
EELV	Marie Leclerc-Bruant	2,212	7.18	+2.76
PS	Jean Jacques Um	1,567	5.08	−31.06
Others	N/A	1,297		
Turnout		31,387	47.88	−9.06
2nd round result
LREM	Jean-Jacques Bridey	12,141	52.70	N/A
LR	Vincent Jeanbrun	10,895	47.30	+2.13
Turnout		25,982	39.63	−14.76
LREM gain from PS		Swing		

=== 2012 ===
Legislative Election 2012: Val-de-Marne's 7th constituency
Party	Candidate	Votes	%	±%
PS	Jean-Jacques Bridey	13,101	36.14	+17.26
UMP	Richard Dell'Agnola	11,942	32.94	−15.88
FG	Christian Hervy	3,710	10.23	+4.88
FN	Jeannine Viaud	3,423	9.44	+6.00
EELV	Marie Leclerc-Bruant	1,602	4.42	+0.72
MoDem	Pascal Provent	863	2.38	−12.43
DVG	Almamy Kanoute	812	2.24	N/A
Others	N/A	779		
Turnout		36,252	56.94	−4.79
2nd round result
PS	Jean-Jacques Bridey	18,986	54.83	+13.28
UMP	Richard Dell'Agnola	15,643	45.17	−13.28
Turnout		34,629	54.39	−1.23
PS gain from UMP				

=== 2007 ===
Legislative Election 2007: Val-de-Marne's 7th constituency
Party	Candidate	Votes	%	±%
UMP	Marie-Anne Montchamp	17,543	48.82	+22.77
PS	Monique Jourbert	6,785	18.88	−2.74
MoDem	Séverine de Compreignac	5,320	14.81	N/A
PCF	Geneviève Vidy	1,923	5.35	+0.69
LV	Annie Lahmer	1,329	3.70	+0.17
FN	Jocelyne Lavocat	1,235	3.44	−4.16
Far left	Sylvette Minnaert	735	2.05	N/A
Others	N/A	1,062		
Turnout		36,343	61.73	−5.70
2nd round result
UMP	Marie-Anne Montchamp	18,595	58.45	−3.41
PS	Monique Jourbert	13,221	41.55	+3.41
Turnout		32,748	55.62	−6.13
UMP hold				

=== 2002 ===
Legislative Election 2002: Val-de-Marne's 7th constituency
Party	Candidate	Votes	%	±%
UMP	Marie-Anne Montchamp	9,227	26.05	+11.95
PS	Nadine Bogossian	7,659	21.62	+2.23
DVD	Pierre Aubry	5,049	14.25	−5.82
UDF	Estelle Debaecker	3,295	9.30	N/A
FN	Francoise Cagniart	2,692	7.60	−4.42
PCF	Genevieve Vidy	1,652	4.66	−5.20
DVG	Luc Gras	1,579	4.46	N/A
LV	Annie Lahmer	1,250	3.53	−0.37
Others	N/A	3,018		
Turnout		35,835	67.43	+0.22
2nd round result
UMP	Marie-Anne Montchamp	19,613	61.86	N/A
PS	Nadine Bogossian	12,093	38.14	−2.64
Turnout		32,819	61.75	−8.98
UMP gain from DVD				

=== 1997 ===
Legislative Election 1997: Val-de-Marne's 7th constituency
Party	Candidate	Votes	%	±%
DVD	Pierre Aubry	6,801	20.07	
PS	Annie-Marie Marty	6,571	19.39	
RPR	Jacques Martin*	4,777	14.10	
FN	Eric Fornal	4,074	12.02	
PCF	Christian Favier	3,342	9.86	
DVD	Estelle Debaecker	3,139	9.26	
LV	Loïc Le Guénédal	1,321	3.90	
DVD	Philippe Desmoulins-Lebeault	934	2.76	
LO	Serge Franceschina	777	2.29	
GE	Philippe Paillas	732	2.16	
Others	N/A	1,415		
Turnout		35,038	67.21	
2nd round result
DVD	Pierre Aubry	20,828	59.22	
PS	Annie-Marie Marty	14,343	40.78	
Turnout		36,873	70.73	
DVD gain from RPR				

== Sources ==
Official results of French elections from 2002: "Résultats électoraux officiels en France" (in French).
