= Catalina =

Catalina may refer to:

== Arts and media ==
- The Catalina, a 2012 American reality television show
- Catalina (novel), a 1948 novel by W. Somerset Maugham
- Catalina (My Name Is Earl), a character from the NBC sitcom My Name Is Earl
- Catalina, a character from the Canadian science fiction television series, Space Cases
- Catalina, a character in the video games Grand Theft Auto: San Andreas and Grand Theft Auto III
- "Catalina", a song from the album Only Built 4 Cuban Linx... Pt. II by Raekwon
- "Catalina", lead single from the 2017 album Los ángeles by Rosalía
- "Catalina", a song from the 2012 album Allah-Las by Allah-Las

== Organizations ==
- Catalina Sky Survey, a NASA project aiming to identify potentially hazardous asteroids (PHAs)
- Catalina Swimwear, a former swimwear line for the Pacific Mills clothing company
- Catalina Yachts, a boat manufacturer
- Santa Catalina Monastery, a cloistered convent located in Arequipa, Peru
- Catalina Island Marine Institute, an institute that runs various beachside camps on Santa Catalina Island, California

== People ==
- Catalina (name), including a list of people with the name
- Santa Catalina, or Catherine of Palma (1533–1574), Spanish saint
- India Catalina, indigenous Calamari princess kidnapped by the Spanish conquerors near Cartagena de Indias
- Lucius Sergius Catilina, often anglicized as Catiline, an Ancient Roman politician

== Places ==
- Catalina, Arizona
- Cătălina (disambiguation), various places in Romania
  - Catalina, Covasna, Romania
- Santa Catalina, Ilocos Sur
- Santa Catalina, Negros Oriental
- Catalina, Newfoundland and Labrador, Canada
- Santa Catalina Mountains
- Archipelago of San Andrés, Providencia and Santa Catalina
- Any of several islands:
  - Santa Catalina Island (California), United States
  - Santa Catalina Island (Colombia)
  - Catalina Island (Dominican Republic)
- Catalina Park, a race track in Katoomba, Australia

== Science and technology ==
- Tomcat Catalina, the Jakarta Tomcat version servlet container since Tomcat 4.x
- Anthocharis cethura catalina, the Catalina Orangetip, a subspecies of Desert Orangetip butterfly only found on Santa Catalina Island
- Catalina (beetle), a genus of rove beetles in the subtribe Perinthina
- C/2013 US10, an Oort cloud comet, also known as Catalina
- macOS Catalina, a desktop computer operating system by Apple released in 2019

== Vehicles ==
- Avid Catalina, an American flying boat homebuilt aircraft design
- Consolidated PBY Catalina, the US Navy designation for an American and Canadian-built flying boat
- Fly Synthesis Catalina, an Italian ultralight flying boat
- Pontiac Catalina, a full-size Pontiac model from the 1950s to the 1980s
- SS Catalina, a 1924 steamship for passenger transport between Los Angeles and Santa Catalina Island
- Sailboats made by Catalina Yachts

== Other uses ==
- Catalina affair, an incident on June 13, 1952, that led to a crisis in Swedish–Soviet relations
- Catalina dressing, a tomato-based salad dressing

== See also ==
- Santa Catalina (disambiguation)
- Catilina, Roman politician from the 1st century BC
- Cătălina (disambiguation)
