= Cătălin Crăciun =

Romanian footballer

Personal information
- Full name: Cătălin Ştefăniţă Crăciun
- Date of birth: 26 August 1991 (age 35)
- Place of birth: Craiova, Romania
- Height: 1.70 m (5 ft 7 in)
- Position: Striker

Team information
- Current team: U Craiova
- Number: 86

Youth career
- 2004–2008: Universitatea Craiova

Senior career*
Years	Team	Apps	(Gls)
2008–	Universitatea Craiova	7	(0)
2009–2010	→ CFR Craiova (loan)	11	(4)

International career
2008–2009	Romania U-18	7	(5)
2009–	Romania U-19	2	(0)
- * Club domestic league appearances and goals

Cătălin Ştefăniţă Crăciun (born 26 August 1991) is a Romanian football player, currently under contract with Universitatea Craiova.
