= Jean-Jacques Bridey =

French politician (born 1953)

Member of the National Assembly for Val-de-Marne's 7th constituency
- Incumbent
- Assumed office 20 June 2012
- Preceded by: Richard Dell'Agnola

Personal details
- Born: 7 May 1953 (age 72) Nice, France
- Party: Socialist Party; La République En Marche!

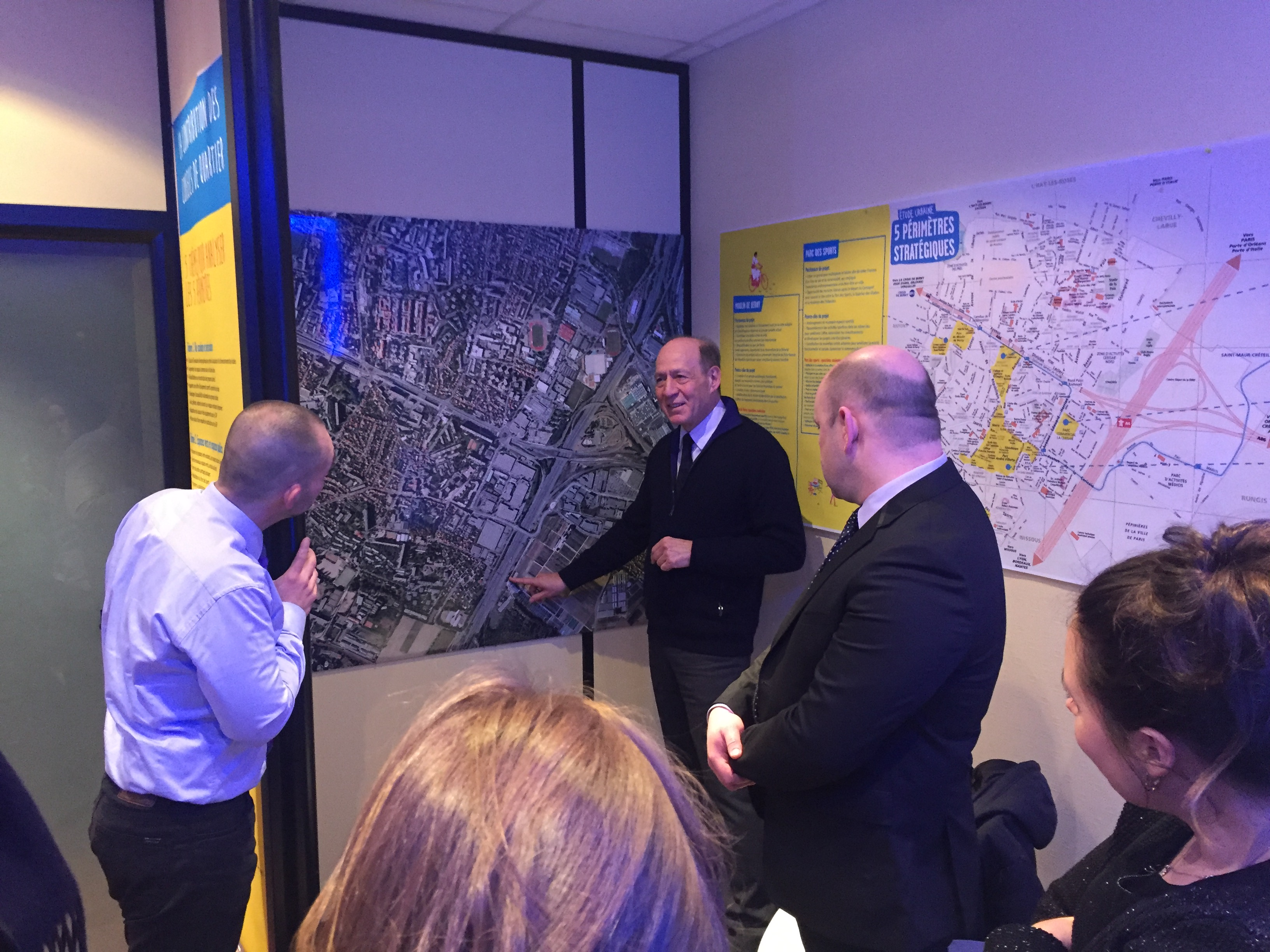
Jean-Jacques Bridey with residents of Fresnes

Jean-Jacques Bridey (born 7 May 1953) is a French politician representing La République En Marche!, formerly a member of the Socialist Party. He was elected to the French National Assembly on 18 June 2017, representing the department of Val-de-Marne.

== Biography ==
Jean-Jacques Bridey is technical director at a photographic laboratory. He was elected mayor of Fresnes, Val-de-Marne in 2001 and representative of Val de Marne for the Socialist Party (France) in the 2012 legislative elections.

He supports Emmanuel Macron, candidate of the En Marche! movement, for the 2017 presidential election. He met him during work on the “Employment, Activity, Growth” law, known as the Macron law, in the National Assembly. He was one of the first parliamentarians to support him, and Emmanuel Macron held his first political meeting in Fresnes on March 19, 2015, at his invitation.

Jean-Jacques Bridey's intervention enabled the Macron law to extend the concession granted to SEMMARIS[6] for the management of the Rungis International Market.

Re-elected as deputy for Val-de-Marne in June 2017, he had to resign from his position as mayor of Fresnes due to the law on the non-accumulation of mandates and was replaced by Marie Chavanon.

On June 29, 2017, he was appointed chair of the National Defense and Armed Forces Committee in the National Assembly. During the mid-term renewal of key positions in the National Assembly, he lost the chairmanship to Françoise Dumas, who succeeded him on July 24, 2019.

During the 2022 legislative elections, he decided not to run for re-election for health reasons.

== See also ==
- 2017 French legislative election
