= Yuliya Fomenko (swimmer) =

Russian swimmer

Personal information
- Full name: Юлия Фоменко
- Nationality: Russia
- Born: 14 January 1981 (age 45) Azov, Rostov Oblast
- Height: 1.78 m (5 ft 10 in)
- Weight: 62 kg (137 lb)

Sport
- Sport: Swimming
- Strokes: Backstroke
- Club: Rostov Teachers Training Institute
Medal record
Women's swimming
Representing Russia
European Championships (LC)
Silver medal – second place	1999 Istanbul	200 m backstroke
European Championships (SC)
Bronze medal – third place	1998 Sheffield	200 m backstroke

Yuliya Fomenko (born 14 January 1981 in Azov, Rostov Oblast) is a retired female backstroke swimmer from Russia, who competed for her native country at the 2000 Olympic Games in Sydney, Australia. There she ended up in 10th place in the 4×200 m freestyle relay.
