= Maja Grozdanić =

Serbian swimmer

Personal information
- Born: 1 May 1981 (age 45) Belgrade, Yugoslavia

Sport
- Sport: Swimming

Maja Grozdanić (born 1 May 1981) is a Serbian swimmer. She competed in the women's 200 metre backstroke event at the 1996 Summer Olympics.
