= CSU Aurel Vlaicu Arad =

Romanian rugby union club

(Romania) CSUAV Arad
- Full name: Clubul Sportiv Universitatea Aurel Vlaicu Arad
- Founded: 2001
- Location: Arad, Romănia
- Ground: Stadionul Sanicolau Mic (Capacity: 1,000)
- President: Ovidiu Şerban
- Coach: Marian Grindei
- League: Divizia Națională de Seniori
- 2018-19: 8th

CSU Aurel Vlaicu Arad is a Romanian semi-professional rugby union club from Arad, which plays in the 2018–2019 season of the Divizia Națională de Seniori, the second level of Romanian rugby.

== International honours ==
- (Moldova) Roman Gobjila
- (England) Oliver Breffit

== See also ==
- Rugby union in Romania
