= Cătălin Tănase =

Romanian biologist (b. 1962)

Cătălin Tănase (b. February 19, 1962 in Epureni, Vaslui County) is a Romanian biologist (mycologist and botanist), professor at the Alexandru Ioan Cuza University of Iași. He is also director of the Anastasie Fătu Botanical Garden of Iași. He was elected a correspondent member of the Romanian Academy in 2018.
