= Izabela Burczyk =

Polish swimmer

Personal information
- Born: 29 June 1972 (age 52); Tczew, Poland

Sport
- Sport: Swimming

Izabela Burczyk (born 29 June 1972) is a Polish swimmer. She competed in the women's 200 metre backstroke event at the 1996 Summer Olympics.
