= Lea Maurer =

American swimmer (born 1971)

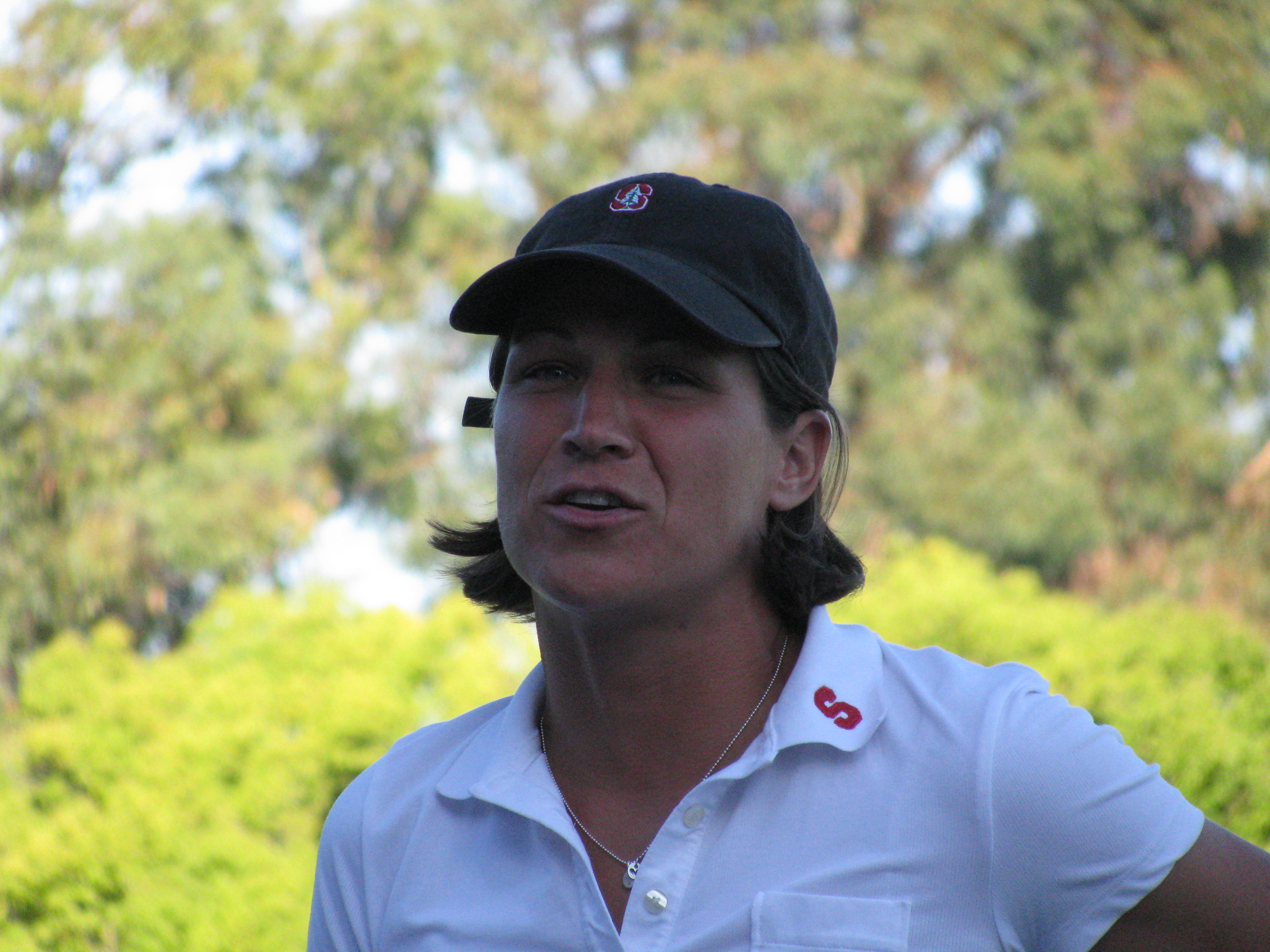
- Maurer in 2008

Personal information
- Full name: Lea Loveless Maurer
- National team: United States
- Born: April 1, 1971 (age 55) Yonkers, New York, U.S.
- Height: 5 ft 6 in (1.68 m)
- Weight: 134 lb (61 kg)

Sport
- Sport: Swimming
- Strokes: Backstroke
- Club: Badger Swim Club
- College team: University of Florida; Stanford University
- Coach: Randy Reese (Florida); Richard Quick (Stanford)
Medal record
Women's swimming
Representing the United States
Olympic Games
Gold medal – first place	1992 Barcelona	4×100 m medley
Bronze medal – third place	1992 Barcelona	100 m backstroke
World Championships (LC)
Gold medal – first place	1998 Perth	100 m backstroke
Gold medal – first place	1998 Perth	4×100 m medley
Silver medal – second place	1994 Rome	4×100 m medley
Pan Pacific Championships
Gold medal – first place	1989 Tokyo	100 m backstroke
Gold medal – first place	1989 Tokyo	4×100 m medley
Gold medal – first place	1993 Kobe	100 m backstroke
Gold medal – first place	1993 Kobe	4×100 m medley
Gold medal – first place	1997 Fukuoka	4×100 m medley
Silver medal – second place	1993 Kobe	200 m backstroke
Silver medal – second place	1995 Atlanta	4×100 m medley
Silver medal – second place	1997 Fukuoka	100 m backstroke
Silver medal – second place	1997 Fukuoka	200 m backstroke

Lea Loveless Maurer (born April 1, 1971), née Lea E. Loveless, is an American former competition swimmer, Olympic champion, and former college swimming coach. She represented the United States at the 1992 Summer Olympics in Barcelona, Spain, where she won a gold medal swimming the backstroke leg of the women's 4×100-meter medley relay. She also won a bronze medal in the 100-meter backstroke. She was the head coach of the Stanford University women's swimming and diving team from 2005 to 2012. She is the Peter Daland Endowed Swimming Coach Chair at USC and has been head coach there since April 2022.

== Swimming career ==
Maurer was born in Yonkers, New York. Early in her career, she was coached by John Collins of the Badger Swim Club in Larchmont, New York, a coach and team that also produced Olympic champions Rick Carey and Cristina Teuscher.

=== College swimming ===
She attended the University of Florida in 1989 and 1990, where she swam for the Florida Gators swimming and diving team under coach Randy Reese. She transferred to Stanford University prior to the 1992 Olympics where she swam for Hall of Fame Coach Richard Quick.

Maurer broke the 100m backstroke American record at 100.82 at the Barcelona Olympic Games leading off the World-Record earning 1992 medley relay. Lea later won the gold at the World Championships in Perth, Australia in 1998 bettering her own American Record to 100.77. In addition to her Olympic and world championship medals, Lea swam on three of Stanford's NCAA swimming championship teams in 1992, 1993 and 1994. She also won three NCAA individual championships in the 100-meter backstroke and one in the 200-meter backstroke. She continued to compete on the USA National Team until 2000.

== Coaching career ==
Following her retirement from competitive swimming, Loveless Maurer, who is married to fellow Stanford swimmer Erik Maurer, became an assistant swimming coach at Northwestern University in Evanston, Illinois. From 1995 to 2005, she coached the boys' and girls' swim teams at Lake Forest High School in Lake Forest, Illinois, during which time the girls' team won the state championship in 2002 and 2003, and the boys' team won the state championship in 2003. Matt Grevers, a four-time Olympic gold medalist and backstroke specialist was one of her more outstanding swimmers during her time at Lake Forest High.

In 2005, she was named head coach of the Stanford women's swimming and diving team. She led the team to back-to-back Pac-10 championships in 2010 and 2011 and resigned following the 2012 season. She was inducted into the Stanford Athletic Hall of Fame in 2006.

Maurer was a volunteer assistant coach for the Stanford men's water polo team since the spring of 2013.

She is a veteran celebrity swimmer for Swim Across America (SAA), a charitable organization that enlists former Olympic swimmers to raise funds for cancer research, and she has participated in three SAA events.

She was the assistant head coach for the USC Trojans under Coach Kipp. She was named head coach in April 2022.

== See also ==
- List of Olympic medalists in swimming (women)
- List of Stanford University people
- List of World Aquatics Championships medalists in swimming (women)
- World record progression 4 × 100 metres medley relay
