= Chen Yan (swimmer, born 1979) =

Chinese swimmer

Personal information
- Full name: Chen Yan
- Nationality: China
- Born: May 2, 1979 (age 47) Nanjing, Jiangsu, China

Sport
- Sport: Swimming
- Strokes: Backstroke
Medal record
Women's swimming
Representing China
Olympic Games
Bronze medal – third place	1996 Atlanta	4×100 m medley
World Championships (SC)
Gold medal – first place	1997 Gothenburg	200 m backstroke
Silver medal – second place	1997 Gothenburg	100 m backstroke

Chen Yan (simplified Chinese: 陈艳; traditional Chinese: 陳艷; pinyin: Chén Yàn; born May 2, 1979, in Nanjing, Jiangsu) is a former Chinese swimmer. She won the bronze medal in the 4×100 m medley relay at the 1996 Summer Olympics. At the 1997 FINA Short Course World Championships she won the gold medal in the 200 m backstroke and the silver medal in the 100 m backstroke. She failed a drug test at the 1998 Asian Games and was suspended from competition for four years.
