= Cătălina Cășaru =

Romanian swimmer

Personal information
- Born: 26 January 1979 (age 47) Brăila, Romania

Sport
- Sport: Swimming

Cătălina Cășaru (born 26 January 1979) is a Romanian backstroke swimmer. She competed in two events at the 1996 Summer Olympics.
