= Olga Kochetkova =

Russian swimmer

Personal information
- Born: 1 November 1979 (age 46)
- Height: 1.73 m (5 ft 8 in)
- Weight: 61 kg (134 lb)

Sport
- Sport: Swimming
- Club: CSKA Moscow
Medal record
Women's swimming
Representing Russia
European Championships
Silver medal – second place	1997 Seville	4×100 m medley

Olga Kochetkova (Russian: Ольга Кочеткова; born 1 November 1979) is a retired Russian backstroke swimmer who won a silver medal in the 4×100 m medley relay at the 1997 European Aquatics Championships. She also competed in the 100 m backstroke at the 1996 Summer Olympics.
