= Swimming at the 1997 European Aquatics Championships – Women's 200 metre backstroke =

The final of the Women's 200 metres Backstroke event at the European LC Championships 1997 was held on Sunday 24 August 1997 in Seville, Spain.

The gold medal was awarded to Cathleen Round with a time of 2:11.46.

== Additional Sources ==
- scmsom results
- La Gazzetta Archivio
- swimrankings
