= Hélène Ricardo =

French swimmer

Personal information
- Born: May 23, 1974 (age 52)

Sport
- Sport: Swimming
- Strokes: Freestyle, backstroke

Hélène Ricardo (born 23 May 1974) is a French former backstroke and freestyle swimmer who competed in the 1996 Summer Olympics.
