= Kateřina Pivoňková =

Czech swimmer

Personal information
- Full name: Kateřina Pivoňková
- Nationality: Czech Republic
- Born: 6 May 1979 (age 47) Vlašim, Středočeský
- Height: 1.77 m (5 ft 10 in)
- Weight: 68 kg (150 lb)

Sport
- Sport: Swimming
- Strokes: Backstroke
- Club: USK Praha
Medal record
European Championships (SC)
| Gold medal – first place | 1996 Rostock | 200 m backstroke |
| Silver medal – second place | 1996 Rostock | 100 m backstroke |

Kateřina Pivoňková (born 6 May 1979 in Vlašim, Středočeský) is a retired female backstroke swimmer from the Czech Republic, who twice competed for her native country at the Olympic Games: in 1996 and 2004.
