= Ivette María =

Spanish swimmer

Personal information
- Born: 27 July 1975 (age 50) Barcelona, Spain

Sport
- Sport: Swimming
Medal record
Representing Spain
European Championships
Bronze medal – third place	1995 Vienna	4x100m medley relay

Ivette María Tato (born 27 July 1975) is a former backstroke swimmer from Spain who competed at the 1996 Summer Olympics in Atlanta, Georgia for her native country. In the Georgia Tech Aquatic Center she finished in 23rd place in the 200 m Backstroke. Four years later, when Sydney, Australia hosted the Summer Games, she ended up in 16th place in the same event, and was a member of the Women's Relay Team in the 4 × 100 m Medley (15th position). She was born in Barcelona, Catalonia.
