= Swimming at the 2003 World Aquatics Championships – Women's 50 metre freestyle =

Women's 50m Freestyle at the 2003 FINA World Aquatics Championships
- Venue: Palau Sant Jordi
- Dates: 26 July (prelims, semifinals); 27 July (final)
- Winning time: 24.47 seconds

Medalists
gold medal	Inge de Bruijn	Netherlands
silver medal	Alice Mills	Australia
bronze medal	Libby Lenton	Australia

The Women's 50m Freestyle event at the 10th FINA World Aquatics Championships swam on 26–27 July 2003 in Barcelona, Spain. Preliminary and semifinal heats swam on July 26, while the Final swam on July 27.

Prior to the event, the World (WR) and Championship (CR) records were:

- WR: 24.13 swum by Inge de Bruijn (Netherlands) on September 22, 2000, in Sydney, Australia
- CR: 24.45 swum by Inge de Bruijn (Netherlands) on July 28, 2001, in Fukuoka, Japan

== Results ==
=== Final ===
Place	Swimmer	Nation	Time	Notes
1	Inge de Bruijn	Netherlands	24.47	
2	Alice Mills	Australia	25.07	
3	Libby Lenton	Australia	25.08	
4	Jenny Thompson	USA	25.10	
5	Sandra Völker	Germany	25.14	
6	Martina Moravcová	Slovakia	25.17	
7	Marleen Veldhuis	Netherlands	25.49	
8	Sviatlana Khakhlova	Belarus	25.53	

=== Semifinals ===
Rank	Heat + Lane	Swimmer	Nation	Time	Notes
1	S1 L4	Inge de Bruijn	Netherlands	24.75	q
2	S1 L7	Libby Lenton	Australia	25.08	q
3	S2 L5	Jenny Thompson	USA	25.09	q
4	S1 L5	Alice Mills	Australia	25.14	q
5	S2 L3	Marleen Veldhuis	Netherlands	25.27	q
6	S1 L1	Sviatlana Khakhlova	Belarus	25.30	q
7	S2 L2	Sandra Völker	Germany	25.34	q
8	S2 L7	Martina Moravcová	Slovakia	25.35	q
9	S2 L4	Alison Sheppard	Great Britain	25.36	
10	S1 L3	Hanna-Maria Seppälä	Finland	25.39	
11	S2 L6	Therese Alshammar	Sweden	25.46	
12	S1 L8	Olga Mukomol	Ukraine	25.49	
13	S1 L6	Haley Cope	USA	25.52	
14	S2 L1	Anna-Karin Kammerling	Sweden	25.60	
15	S2 L8	Ana Belén Palomo	Spain	25.67	
16	S1 L2	Daniela Götz	Germany	25.78	

=== Preliminaries ===
Rank	Heat+Lane	Swimmer	Nation	Time	Notes
1	H12 L4	Alison Sheppard	Great Britain	25.16	q
2	H14 L4	Inge de Bruijn	Netherlands	25.26	q
3	H14 L5	Jenny Thompson	United States	25.27	q
4	H13 L3	Alice Mills	Australia	25.32	q
5	H12 L3	Marleen Veldhuis	Netherlands	25.43	q
6	H12 L6	Hanna-Maria Seppälä	Finland	25.46	q
6	H13 L4	Therese Alshammar	Sweden	25.46	q
8	H13 L6	Haley Cope	United States	25.56	q
9	H14 L3	Sandra Völker	Germany	25.69	q
10	H14 L6	Daniela Götz	Germany	25.70	q
11	H12 L5	Martina Moravcová	Slovakia	25.72	q
12	H13 L5	Lisbeth Lenton	Australia	25.76	q
13	H14 L2	Anna-Karin Kammerling	Sweden	25.79	q
13	H14 L1	Sviatlana Khakhlova	Belarus	25.79	q
15	H12 L1	Ana Belén Palomo	Spain	25.84	q
16	H12 L2	Olga Mukomol	Ukraine	25.88	q
17	H13 L7	Judith Draxler	Austria	25.89	
18	H14 L8	Flávia Delaroli	Brazil	26.01	
19	H11 L6	Wu Binan	China	26.02	
20	H13 L2	Cristina Chiuso	Italy	26.03	
21	H01 L3	Ryu Yoon-Ji	South Korea	26.06	
21	H12 L7	Eileen Coparropa	Panama	26.06	
23	H11 L3	Ivana Lange	Slovakia	26.10	
24	H13 L8	Laura Nicholls	Canada	26.13	
25	H02 L3	Triin Aljand	Estonia	26.15	
26	H14 L7	Sun So-Eun	South Korea	26.20	
27	H10 L1	Zhu Yingwen	China	26.32	
28	H13 L1	Marina Chepurkova	Russia	26.33	
29	H10 L5	Nery Mantey Niangkouara	Greece	26.44	
29	H11 L8	Fabienne Nadarajah	Austria	26.44	
31	H09 L4	Julie Douglas	Ireland	26.48	
32	H11 L4	Rosalind Brett	Great Britain	26.50	
33	H11 L1	Alison Fitch	New Zealand	26.56	
34	H11 L2	Lauren Roets	South Africa	26.60	
35	H11 L5	Paulina Barzycka	Poland	26.64	
36	H10 L4	Jana Myskova	Czech Republic	26.68	
37	H09 L6	Jennifer Ng	Hong Kong	26.69	
37	H10 L3	Florencia Szigeti	Argentina	26.69	
39	H08 L8	Marianne Limpert	Canada	26.76	
40	H12 L8	Jana Kolukanova	Estonia	26.81	
41	H08 L3	Eleni Kosti	Greece	26.87	
42	H09 L1	Kolbrún Ýr Kristjánsdóttir	Iceland	26.89	
43	H10 L2	Rebeca Gusmão	Brazil	26.94	
44	H09 L3	Hannah McLean	New Zealand	26.95	
45	H10 L6	Moe Thu Aung	Myanmar	27.07	
46	H09 L7	Maj Hillesund	Norway	27.09	
47	H09 L8	Maryia Shcherba	Belarus	27.14	
47	H10 L8	Lara Heinz	Luxembourg	27.14	
49	H08 L5	Sharntelle McLean	Trinidad and Tobago	27.16	
50	H08 L2	Yelena Skalinskaya	Kazakhstan	27.19	
51	H07 L5	Anna-Liza Mopio-Jane	Papua New Guinea	27.21	
52	H08 L7	Ximena Vilar	Venezuela	27.28	
53	H09 L2	Yamilé Bahamonde	Ecuador	27.29	
54	H08 L1	Shikha Tandon	India	27.34	
55	H07 L6	Agnese Ozolina	Latvia	27.45	
56	H07 L4	Larissa Komt	Peru	27.51	
57	H08 L4	Maria Tregubova	Moldova	27.54	
58	H08 L6	Marianella Marin	Costa Rica	27.57	
59	H07 L3	Diana López	Venezuela	27.65	
60	H07 L7	Leonore Kelleher	Ireland	27.67	
61	H06 L4	Kiera Aitken	Bermuda	27.97	
62	H07 L2	Lizza Danila	Philippines	28.29	
63	H07 L8	Ayeisha Collymore	Trinidad and Tobago	28.41	
64	H06 L2	Khadija Ciss	Senegal	28.45	
65	H06 L6	Geraldine Arce	Nicaragua	28.56	
66	H07 L1	Carolina Cerqueda	Andorra	28.62	
67	H06 L5	Roshendra Vrolijk	Aruba	28.76	
68	H02 L2	Nicole Hayes	Palau	29.05	
69	H06 L7	Sade Daal	Suriname	29.14	
70	H06 L3	Menaka de Silva	Sri Lanka	29.28	
71	H06 L8	Jakie Wellman	Zambia	29.33	
72	H05 L4	Shrone Austin	Seychelles	29.36	
73	H06 L1	Man Wai Fong	Macau	29.57	
74	H05 L3	Eliane Droubry Dohi	Ivory Coast	29.59	
75	H05 L5	Cheok Mei Ma	Macau	29.78	
76	H04 L4	Eva Donde	Kenya	29.84	
77	H04 L2	Binta Zahra Diop	Senegal	30.33	
77	H05 L6	Emerlinda Zefanias Zamba	Mozambique	30.33	
79	H04 L6	Tracy-Ann Route	Federated States of Micronesia	30.47	
80	H04 L8	Clara Monika Bakale	Republic of the Congo	30.56	
81	H02 L8	Asanti Mickle	Guyana	30.60	
82	H05 L7	Samar Nassar	Jordan	30.65	
83	H05 L1	Tojohanitra Andriamanjatoarimanana	Madagascar	30.83	
84	H04 L7	Rovena Marku	Albania	30.85	
85	H03 L3	Liana Ramerison Rabenja	Madagascar	31.00	
86	H02 L7	Aminath Rouya Hussain	Maldives	31.12	
87	H05 L8	Rubab Raza	Pakistan	31.25	
88	H04 L3	Genevieve Meledje Lasm Quissoh	Ivory Coast	31.30	
89	H03 L6	Sameera Bitar	Bahrain	31.37	
90	H03 L5	Doli Akhter	Bangladesh	31.42	
90	H05 L2	Ghazal El Jobeili	Lebanon	31.42	
92	H04 L1	Joana Gjini	Albania	31.95	
93	H03 L4	Melissa Ashby	Grenada	32.17	
94	H02 L4	Jumana Taraif	Bahrain	32.40	
95	H01 L5	Evelyn Otto	Palau	33.30	
96	H03 L8	Christal Clashing	Antigua and Barbuda	34.36	
97	H01 L6	Ket Sivan	Cambodia	34.68	
98	H02 L5	Vilayphone Vongphachanh	Laos	35.55	
99	H02 L6	Amira Edrahi	Libya	42.05	
100	H03 L1	Ginette Botende	Republic of the Congo	44.88	
-	-	Joscelin Yeo	Singapore	DNS	
-	-	Marjorie Sagne	Switzerland	DNS	
-	-	Dominique Diezi	Switzerland	DNS	
-	-	Ekaterina Serebryakova	Uzbekistan	DNS	
-	-	Nayana Shakya	Nepal	DNS	
-	-	Elize Taua	Samoa	DNS	
-	-	Larissa Inangorore	Burundi	DNS	
-	-	Swiri Minnette Ndenge	Cameroon	DNS	
-	-	Elizabeth Yondo	Cameroon	DNS	
