= Swimming at the 2003 World Aquatics Championships – Women's 100 metre freestyle =

Women's 100m Freestyle at the 2003 FINA World Aquatics Championships
- Venue: Palau Sant Jordi
- Dates: 24 July (prelims, semifinals); 25 July (final)
- Winning time: 54.37 seconds

Medalists
gold medal	Hanna-Maria Seppälä	Finland
silver medal	Jodie Henry	Australia
bronze medal	Jenny Thompson	United States

The Women's 100m Freestyle event at the 10th FINA World Aquatics Championships swam on 24–25 July 2003 in Barcelona, Spain. Preliminary and semifinal heats were swum on July 24; the Final swam in the evening session on July 25.

Prior to the event, the World (WR) and Championship (CR) records were:

- WR: 53.77 swum by Inge de Bruijn (Netherlands) on September 20, 2000, in Sydney, Australia
- CR: 54.01 swum by Jingyi Le (China) on September 5, 1994, in Rome, Italy

== Results ==
=== Final ===
Place	Swimmer	Nation	Time	Notes
1	Hanna-Maria Seppälä	Finland	54.37	
2	Jodie Henry	Australia	54.58	
3	Jenny Thompson	USA	54.65	
4	Alena Popchanka	Belarus	54.79	
5	Libby Lenton	Australia	54.82	
6	Martina Moravcová	Slovakia	54.86	
7	Antje Buschschulte	Germany	54.91	
8	Marleen Veldhuis	Netherlands	55.17	

=== Semifinals ===
Rank	Heat + Lane	Swimmer	Nation	Time	Notes
1	S2 L4	Hanna-Maria Seppälä	Finland	54.48	q
2	S2 L3	Jodie Henry	Australia	54.78	q
3	S1 L4	Jenny Thompson	USA	54.81	q
4	S1 L3	Libby Lenton	Australia	54.92	q
5	S1 L5	Martina Moravcová	Slovakia	55.00	q
6	S2 L5	Marleen Veldhuis	Netherlands	55.04	q
7	S1 L6	Alena Popchanka	Belarus	55.13	q
8	S1 L2	Antje Buschschulte	Germany	55.20	q
9	S2 L6	Chantal Groot	Netherlands	55.23	
10	S1 L7	Tomoko Nagai	Japan	55.63	
11	S2 L2	Petra Dallmann	Germany	55.80	
12	S2 L7	Solenne Figuès	France	56.04	
13	S2 L1	Nery-Mantey Niangkouara	Greece	56.10	
14	S2 L8	Paulina Barzycka	Poland	56.17	
15	S1 L1	Johanna Sjöberg	Sweden	56.48	
16	S1 L8	Elina Partõka	Estonia	56.50	

=== Preliminaries ===
Rank	Heat+Lane	Swimmer	Nation	Time	Notes
1	H11 L4	Hanna-Maria Seppälä	Finland	54.82	q
2	H12 L3	Jenny Thompson	United States	54.83	q
3	H11 L2	Marleen Veldhuis	Netherlands	55.15	q
4	H11 L3	Martina Moravcová	Slovakia	55.19	q
5	H10 L4	Jodie Henry	Australia	55.37	q
6	H10 L5	Libby Lenton	Australia	55.44	q
7	H11 L6	Yu Yang	China	55.72	q, scratched
8	H10 L7	Chantal Groot	Netherlands	55.78	q
9	H12 L5	Alena Popchanka	Belarus	55.82	q
10	H11 L5	Petra Dallmann	Germany	55.86	q
11	H12 L6	Antje Buschschulte	Germany	55.95	q
12	H10 L3	Xu Yanwei	China	55.98	q, scratched
13	H12 L1	Solenne Figuès	France	56.02	q
14	H09 L4	Tomoko Nagai	Japan	56.16	q
15	H10 L6	Alison Sheppard	Great Britain	56.17	q, scratched
16	H12 L7	Johanna Sjöberg	Sweden	56.20	q
17	H10 L8	Paulina Barzycka	Poland	56.39	
18	H08 L4	Elina Partõka	Estonia	56.43	
19	H09 L3	Yoon Ji Ryu	South Korea	56.46	
20	H09 L8	Nery-Mantey Niangkouara	Greece	56.50	
20	H10 L2	Hanna Scherba	Belarus	56.50	
22	H10 L1	Kathryn Evans	Great Britain	56.53	
23	H09 L7	Laura Nicholls	Canada	56.57	
24	H09 L5	Flávia Delaroli	Brazil	56.61	
25	H09 L2	Jana Myskova	Czech Republic	56.63	
25	H11 L7	Olga Mukomol	Ukraine	56.63	
27	H09 L1	Eleni Kosti	Greece	56.68	
27	H12 L2	Therese Alshammar	Sweden	56.68	
29	H08 L1	Florencia Szigeti	Argentina	56.79	
30	H12 L8	Lauren Roets	South Africa	56.94	
31	H12 L4	Natalie Coughlin	United States	56.98	
32	H08 L8	Nataliya Khudyakova	Ukraine	57.08	
33	H01 L1	So Eun Sun	South Korea	57.25	
34	H08 L2	Dominique Diezi	Switzerland	57.30	
35	H08 L5	Jana Kolukanova	Estonia	57.45	
36	H09 L6	Marina Tchepourkova	Russia	57.67	
37	H08 L3	Rebeca Gusmão	Brazil	57.88	
38	H07 L2	Kolbrún Ýr Kristjánsdóttir	Iceland	57.94	
39	H07 L3	Julie Hjorth-Hansen	Denmark	58.12	
40	H07 L6	Marjorie Sagne	Switzerland	58.17	
41	H07 L4	Lara Heinz	Luxembourg	58.23	
42	H07 L5	Julie Douglas	Ireland	58.53	
43	H07 L1	Agnese Ozoliņa	Latvia	58.57	
44	H06 L5	Jennifer Ng	Hong Kong	58.71	
45	H07 L7	Shikha Tandon	India	58.82	
46	H06 L6	Diana Lopez	Venezuela	58.99	
47	H05 L7	Lára Hrund Bjargardóttir	Iceland	59.07	
48	H05 L5	Anna-Liza Mopio	Papua New Guinea	59.16	
49	H05 L3	Sharntelle McLean	Trinidad and Tobago	59.28	
50	H06 L2	Ximena Vilar	Venezuela	59.64	
51	H06 L1	Yamilé Bahamonde	Ecuador	59.69	
51	H06 L8	Yelena Skalinskaya	Kazakhstan	59.69	
53	H05 L4	Maria Tregubova	Moldova	59.96	
54	H04 L3	Kiera Aitken	Bermuda	1:00.16	
55	H06 L7	Marianella Marin	Costa Rica	1:00.45	
56	H06 L3	Irina Shlemova	Uzbekistan	1:00.67	
57	H04 L4	Khadija Ciss	Senegal	1:00.82	
58	H05 L2	Larissa Komt	Peru	1:00.96	
59	H05 L6	Lizza Danila	Philippines	1:01.07	
60	H06 L4	Chonlatorn Vorathamrong	Thailand	1:01.23	
61	H05 L1	Carolina Cerqueda	Andorra	1:01.55	
62	H04 L2	Geraldine Arce	Nicaragua	1:02.29	
63	H04 L7	Ambica Iyengar	India	1:02.32	
64	H01 L3	Nicole Hayes	Palau	1:02.38	
65	H03 L2	Shrone Austin	Seychelles	1:02.67	
66	H04 L5	Magdalena Sutanto	Indonesia	1:03.07	
67	H04 L6	Roshendra Vrolijk	Aruba	1:03.28	
68	H04 L1	Roberta Callus	Malta	1:03.30	
69	H03 L5	Jakie Wellman	Zambia	1:03.47	
69	H03 L3	Man Wai Fong	Macau	1:03.47	
71	H04 L8	Simona Muccioli	San Marino	1:04.11	
72	H03 L4	Sade Daal	Suriname	1:04.70	
73	H03 L7	Eva Donde	Kenya	1:05.65	
74	H02 L5	Binta Zahra Diop	Senegal	1:06.75	
75	H02 L4	Genevieve Meledje Lasm Quissoh	Ivory Coast	1:07.37	
76	H02 L6	Emerlinda Zefanias Zamba	Mozambique	1:08.25	
77	H03 L6	Tojohanitra Andriamanjatoarimanana	Madagascar	1:08.30	
78	H01 L7	Asanti Mickle	Guyana	1:08.61	
79	H01 L4	Samera Bitar	Bahrain	1:08.75	
80	H02 L8	Monika Bakale	Republic of the Congo	1:08.98	
81	H03 L1	Ghazal El Jobeili	Lebanon	1:09.86	
82	H02 L2	Rovena Marku	Albania	1:10.08	
83	H02 L7	Joana Gjini	Albania	1:11.18	
84	H01 L6	Aminath Rouya Hussain	Maldives	1:11.58	
85	H02 L3	Rubab Raza	Pakistan	1:12.16	
86	H01 L5	Mariyam Nafha Ali	Maldives	1:15.76	
-	H03 L8	Éliane Droubry	Ivory Coast	DQ	
-	-	Federica Pellegrini	Italy	DNS	
-	-	Alison Fitch	New Zealand	DNS	
-	-	Marianne Limpert	Canada	DNS	
-	-	Joscelin Yeo	Singapore	DNS	
-	-	Maj Hillesund	Norway	DNS	
-	-	Ayeisha Collymore	Trinidad and Tobago	DNS	
-	-	Elize Taua	Samoa	DNS	
-	-	Larissa Inangorore	Burundi	DNS	
