= Swimming at the 2003 World Aquatics Championships – Women's 50 metre butterfly =

Women's 50 Fly at the 2003 FINA World Aquatics Championships
- Dates: July 25 (prelims, semifinals); July 26 (final)

Medalists
gold medal	Inge de Bruijn	Netherlands
silver medal	Jenny Thompson	United States
bronze medal	Anna-Karin Kammerling	Sweden

The Women's 50m Butterfly event at the 10th FINA World Aquatics Championships swam on July 25 – 26, 2003 in Barcelona, Spain. Preliminary and Semifinal heats swam on July 25, with the Final swum on July 26.

At the start of the event, the World (WR) and Championship (CR) records were:

- WR: 25.57 swum by Anna-Karin Kammerling (Sweden) on July 30, 2002 in Berlin, Germany.
- CR: 25.90 swum by Inge de Bruijn (Netherlands) on July 26, 2001 in Fukuoka, Japan

== Results ==
=== Final ===
Place	Swimmer	Nation	Time	Notes
1	Inge de Bruijn	Netherlands	25.84	CR
2	Jenny Thompson	USA	26.00	NR
3	Anna-Karin Kammerling	Sweden	26.06	
4	Yafei Zhou	China	26.85	
5	Chantal Groot	Netherlands	26.92	
6	Vered Borochovsky	Israel	26.98	
7	Nataliya Khudyakova	Ukraine	27.10	
8	Ángela San Juan	Spain	27.24	

=== Semifinals ===
Rank	Heat + Lane	Swimmer	Nation	Time	Notes
1	S2 L4	Inge de Bruijn	Netherlands	25.94	q
2	S1 L5	Yafei Zhou	China	26.73	q
2	S2 L5	Anna-Karin Kammerling	Sweden	26.73	q
4	S1 L3	Chantal Groot	Netherlands	26.82	q
5	S2 L3	Vered Borochovsky	Israel	26.97	q
6	S1 L2	Nataliya Khudyakova	Ukraine	27.10	q
7	S1 L4	Jenny Thompson	USA	27.16	q
8	S1 L7	Ángela San Juan	Spain	27.23	q
9	S2 L6	Mary DeScenza	USA	27.25	
10	S1 L8	Fabienne Dufour	Belgium	27.38	
10	S2 L2	Junko Onishi	Japan	27.38	
12	S2 L1	Fabienne Nadarajah	Austria	27.43	
13	S1 L6	Tine Bossuyt	Belgium	27.46	
14	S1 L1	Libby Lenton	Australia	27.48	
15	S2 L8	Gabriella Fagundez	Sweden	27.66	
16	S2 L7	Triin Aljand	Estonia	27.67	

=== Preliminaries ===
Rank	Heat+Lane	Swimmer	Nation	Time	Notes
1	H7 L4	Inge de Bruijn	Netherlands	26.33	q
2	H8 L5	Jenny Thompson	United States	27.01	q
3	H8 L4	Anna-Karin Kammerling	Sweden	27.16	q
4	H8 L6	Yafei Zhou	China	27.33	q
5	H6 L3	Vered Borochovsky	Israel	27.37	q
6	H6 L4	Chantal Groot	Netherlands	27.40	q
6	H7 L8	Mary DeScenza	United States	27.40	q
8	H7 L6	Tine Bossuyt	Belgium	27.46	q
9	H6 L6	Junko Onishi	Japan	27.53	q
9	H7 L1	Nataliya Khudyakova	Ukraine	27.53	q
11	H1 L4	Triin Aljand	Estonia	27.54	q
12	H7 L5	Ángela San Juan	Spain	27.56	q
13	H6 L5	Fabienne Nadarajah	Austria	27.64	q
14	H8 L3	Libby Lenton	Australia	27.65	q
15	H8 L7	Gabriella Fagundez	Sweden	27.67	q
16	H7 L2	Fabienne Dufour	Belgium	27.73	q
17	H7 L3	Rosalind Brett	Great Britain	27.81	
18	H7 L7	Melanie Houghton	Australia	27.96	
19	H8 L2	Judith Draxler	Austria	28.00	
20	H6 L7	Maj Hillesund	Norway	28.02	
21	H6 L2	Mandy Loots	South Africa	28.08	
22	H8 L8	Jennifer Carroll	Canada	28.25	
23	H8 L1	Jennifer Button	Canada	28.27	
24	H5 L4	Sara Oliveira	Portugal	28.44	
25	H5 L6	Kolbrún Ýr Kristjánsdóttir	Iceland	28.61	
26	H5 L3	Hang Yu Sze	Hong Kong	28.69	
27	H5 L7	Marjorie Sagne	Switzerland	28.73	
28	H4 L3	Sharntelle McLean	Trinidad and Tobago	28.81	
29	H5 L8	Maria Rodriguez	Venezuela	29.05	
30	H5 L5	Danijela Djikanovic	FR Yugoslavia	29.20	
31	H5 L1	Flora Kong	Hong Kong	29.30	
32	H6 L8	Julie Douglas	Ireland	29.34	
33	H4 L2	Yamilé Bahamonde	Ecuador	29.35	
34	H4 L5	Ivi Monteiro	Brazil	29.36	
35	H4 L7	Larissa Komt	Peru	29.82	
36	H4 L8	Sabria Dahane	Algeria	29.99	
37	H4 L4	Irina Shlemova	Uzbekistan	30.12	
38	H4 L6	Leonore Kelleher	Ireland	30.20	
39	H4 L1	Angela Galea	Malta	30.25	
40	H3 L6	Geraldine Arce	Nicaragua	30.63	
41	H3 L4	Cheok Mei Ma	Macau	31.11	
42	H3 L5	Natasha George	Saint Lucia	31.27	
43	H1 L5	Nicole Hayes	Palau	31.36	
44	H3 L7	Éliane Droubry	Ivory Coast	31.57	
45	H3 L1	Binta Zahra Diop	Senegal	31.60	
46	H3 L2	Roshendra Vrolijk	Aruba	31.72	
47	H3 L8	Eva Donde	Kenya	31.99	
48	H2 L3	Krystle Babao	Papua New Guinea	32.06	
49	H2 L6	Jakie Wellman	Zambia	32.40	
50	H1 L3	Tracy Ann Route	Federated States of Micronesia	32.44	
51	H2 L5	Kiran Khan	Pakistan	32.61	
52	H2 L4	Genevieve Meledje Lasm Quissoh	Ivory Coast	33.68	
53	H2 L1	Monika Bakale	Republic of the Congo	34.74	
54	H2 L7	Joana Gjini	Albania	34.83	
55	H2 L2	Nayana Shakya	Nepal	36.70	
56	H1 L6	Amber Yobech	Palau	38.27	
-	-	Joscelin Yeo	Singapore	DNS	
-	-	Alessandra Cappa	Italy	DNS	
-	-	Elize Taua	Samoa	DNS	
