= Swimming at the 2003 World Aquatics Championships – Women's 100 metre butterfly =

Women's 100m Butterfly at the 2003 FINA World Aquatics Championships
- Dates: 20 July 2003 (prelims, semifinals); 21 July 2003 (final)

Medalists
| gold medal | Jenny Thompson | United States |
| silver medal | Otylia Jędrzejczak | Poland |
| bronze medal | Martina Moravcová | Slovakia |

The Women's 100m Butterfly event at the 10th FINA World Aquatics Championships swam 20–21 July 2003 in Barcelona, Spain. Preliminary heats swam in the morning session of 20 July, with the top-16 finishers advancing to semifinal heats that evening. The top-8 finishers from the Semifinals then advanced to swim again in the Final the next evening.

At the start of the event, the World (WR) and Championship (CR) records were:

- WR: 56.61 swum by Inge de Bruijn (Netherlands) on September 17, 2000, in Sydney, Australia.
- CR: 58.27 swum by Petria Thomas (Australia) on July 28, 2001, in Fukuoka, Japan

== Results ==
=== Final ===
| Place | Swimmer | Nation | Time | Notes |
|---|---|---|---|---|
| 1 | Jenny Thompson | USA | 57.96 | CR |
| 2 | Otylia Jędrzejczak | Poland | 58.22 | |
| 3 | Martina Moravcová | Slovakia | 58.24 | |
| 4 | Alena Popchanka | Belarus | 58.90 | |
| 5 | Yafei Zhou | China | 59.08 | |
| 6 | Anna-Karin Kammerling | Sweden | 59.14 | |
| 7 | Yuko Nakanishi | Japan | 59.32 | |
| 8 | Natalie Coughlin | USA | 59.63 | |

=== Semifinals ===
| Rank | Heat + Lane | Swimmer | Nation | Time | Notes |
|---|---|---|---|---|---|
| 1 | S2 L4 | Jenny Thompson | USA | 57.99 | q, CR |
| 2 | S1 L4 | Martina Moravcová | Slovakia | 58.05 | q |
| 3 | S2 L5 | Otylia Jędrzejczak | Poland | 58.44 | q |
| 4 | S1 L3 | Alena Popchanka | Belarus | 58.61 | q |
| 5 | S1 L5 | Anna-Karin Kammerling | Sweden | 58.71 | q |
| 6 | S2 L3 | Natalie Coughlin | USA | 58.97 | q |
| 7 | S2 L2 | Yafei Zhou | China | 59.10 | q |
| 8 | S2 L1 | Yuko Nakanishi | Japan | 59.28 | q |
| 9 | S1 L6 | Vered Borochovsky | Israel | 59.41 | |
| 10 | S2 L7 | Jessicah Schipper | Australia | 59.48 | |
| 11 | S1 L8 | Chantal Groot | Netherlands | 59.58 | |
| 12 | S2 L8 | Junko Onishi | Japan | 59.72 | |
| 13 | S1 L2 | Inge Dekker | Netherlands | 59.74 | |
| 14 | S1 L1 | Annika Mehlhorn | Germany | 59.76 | |
| 15 | S1 L7 | Jen Button | Canada | 59.93 | |
| 16 | S2 L6 | Johanna Sjöberg | Sweden | 59.97 | |

=== Preliminaries ===
| Rank | Heat+Lane | Swimmer | Nation | Time | Notes |
|---|---|---|---|---|---|
| 1 | H8 L5 | Jenny Thompson | United States | 58.14 | q, CR |
| 2 | H6 L4 | Martina Moravcová | Slovakia | 58.64 | q |
| 3 | H7 L4 | Otylia Jędrzejczak | Poland | 58.89 | q |
| 4 | H7 L5 | Anna-Karin Kammerling | Sweden | 59.05 | q |
| 4 | H8 L4 | Natalie Coughlin | United States | 59.05 | q |
| 6 | H6 L5 | Alena Popchanka | Belarus | 59.33 | q |
| 7 | H6 L3 | Johanna Sjöberg | Sweden | 59.60 | q |
| 8 | H7 L6 | Vered Borochovsky | Israel | 59.66 | q |
| 9 | H8 L3 | Yafei Zhou | China | 59.69 | q |
| 10 | H8 L1 | Inge Dekker | Netherlands | 59.72 | q |
| 11 | H6 L2 | Jessicah Schipper | Australia | 59.90 | q |
| 12 | H6 L6 | Jen Button | Canada | 1:00.01 | q |
| 13 | H7 L1 | Yuko Nakanishi | Japan | 1:00.02 | q |
| 14 | H7 L2 | Annika Mehlhorn | Germany | 1:00.08 | q |
| 15 | H7 L3 | Junko Onishi | Japan | 1:00.09 | q |
| 16 | H7 L7 | Chantal Groot | Netherlands | 1:00.13 | q |
| 17 | H6 L1 | Fabienne Dufour | Belgium | 1:00.80 | |
| 18 | H6 L7 | Natalia Soutiaguina | Russia | 1:00.82 | |
| 19 | H8 L7 | Libby Lenton | Australia | 1:00.88 | |
| 20 | H8 L2 | Mandy Loots | South Africa | 1:01.04 | |
| 21 | H8 L6 | Francesca Segat | Italy | 1:01.34 | |
| 22 | H8 L8 | Sara Oliveira | Portugal | 1:01.52 | |
| 23 | H5 L4 | Fabienne Nadarajah | Austria | 1:01.65 | |
| 24 | H5 L6 | Petra Zahrl | Austria | 1:01.69 | |
| 25 | H5 L7 | Ivi Monteiro | Brazil | 1:02.32 | |
| 26 | H6 L8 | Maj Hillesund | Norway | 1:02.85 | |
| 27 | H1 L3 | Kyung Hwa Park | South Korea | 1:02.91 | |
| 28 | H4 L4 | Maria Rodriguez | Venezuela | 1:03.38 | |
| 29 | H5 L3 | Hang Yu Sze | Hong Kong | 1:03.47 | |
| 30 | H3 L4 | Kolbrún Ýr Kristjánsdóttir | Iceland | 1:03.49 | |
| 31 | H5 L1 | Elizabeth Van Welie | New Zealand | 1:03.61 | |
| 32 | H4 L5 | Gülşah Günenç | Turkey | 1:03.62 | |
| 33 | H5 L2 | Leonore Kelleher | Ireland | 1:03.69 | |
| 34 | H4 L1 | Vanessa Duenas Uribe | Colombia | 1:04.13 | |
| 35 | H5 L5 | Flora Kong | Hong Kong | 1:04.44 | |
| 36 | H5 L8 | Marcella Amar | Brazil | 1:04.73 | |
| 37 | H4 L2 | Angela Galea | Malta | 1:04.88 | |
| 38 | H3 L5 | Sharntelle McLean | Trinidad and Tobago | 1:05.36 | |
| 39 | H4 L6 | Irina Shlemova | Uzbekistan | 1:05.98 | |
| 40 | H3 L3 | Richa Mishra | India | 1:06.08 | |
| 41 | H3 L6 | Yamilé Bahamonde | Ecuador | 1:06.29 | |
| 42 | H4 L8 | Mariana Bertellotti | Argentina | 1:06.70 | |
| 43 | H3 L7 | Sabria Dahane | Algeria | 1:07.04 | |
| 44 | H2 L4 | Cheok Mei Ma | Macau | 1:08.92 | |
| 45 | H3 L1 | Geraldine Arce | Nicaragua | 1:09.23 | |
| 46 | H2 L5 | Natasha George | Saint Lucia | 1:09.52 | |
| 47 | H3 L8 | Ambica Iyengar | India | 1:09.63 | |
| 48 | H3 L2 | Simona Muccioli | San Marino | 1:10.06 | |
| 49 | H2 L7 | Krystle Babao | Papua New Guinea | 1:13.29 | |
| 50 | H2 L6 | Binta Zahra Diop | Senegal | 1:13.88 | |
| 51 | H1 L4 | Jakie Wellman | Zambia | 1:15.53 | |
| 52 | H2 L2 | Eva Donde | Kenya | 1:17.20 | |
| 53 | H1 L5 | Aminath Rouya Hussain | Maldives | 1:33.43 | |
| - | - | Joscelin Yeo | Singapore | DNS | |
| - | - | Vesna Stojanovska | Macedonia | DNS | |
| - | - | Raquel Felgueiras | Portugal | DNS | |
| - | - | Elize Taua | Samoa | DNS | |
