= Swimming at the 2003 World Aquatics Championships – Women's 200 metre freestyle =

Women's 200m Freestyle at the 2003 FINA World Aquatics Championships
- Venue: Palau Sant Jordi
- Dates: 22 July (prelims, semifinals); 23 July (final)
- Winning time: 1 minute 58.32 seconds

Medalists
gold medal	Alena Popchanka	Belarus
silver medal	Martina Moravcova	Slovakia
bronze medal	Yang Yu	China

The Women's 200m Freestyle event at the 10th FINA World Aquatics Championships swam on 22–23 July 2003 in Barcelona, Spain. Preliminary and semifinal heats swam on July 22, while the Final swam on July 23.

Prior to the event, the World (WR) and Championship (CR) records were:

- WR: 1:56.64 swum by Franziska van Almsick (Germany) on August 3, 2002 in Berlin, Germany
- CR: 1:56.78 swum by Franziska van Almsick (Germany) on September 6, 1994 in Rome, Italy

== Results ==
=== Final ===
Place	Swimmer	Nation	Time	Notes
1	Alena Popchanka	Belarus	1:58.32	
2	Martina Moravcová	Slovakia	1:58.44	
3	Yang Yu	China	1:58.54	
4	Lindsay Benko	USA	1:58.84	
5	Solenne Figuès	France	1:59.27	
6	Josefin Lillhage	Sweden	1:59.28	
7	Elka Graham	Australia	1:59.46	
8	Rhi Jeffrey	USA	1:59.81	

=== Semifinals ===
Rank	Heat + Lane	Swimmer	Nation	Time	Notes
1	S2 L4	Lindsay Benko	USA	1:59.13	q
2	S1 L5	Elka Graham	Australia	1:59.37	q
3	S1 L3	Solenne Figuès	France	1:59.38	q
4	S2 L6	Alena Popchanka	Belarus	1:59.50	q
5	S1 L4	Yu Yang	China	1:59.51	q
6	S2 L5	Josefin Lillhage	Sweden	1:59.62	q
7	S1 L2	Rhi Jeffrey	USA	1:59.76	q
8	S1 L6	Martina Moravcová	Slovakia	1:59.79	q
9	S2 L1	Zoi Dimoschaki	Greece	1:59.93	
10	S2 L7	Xu Yanwei	China	2:00.32	
11	S1 L8	Karen Pickering	Great Britain	2:00.89	
12	S2 L3	Melanie Marshall	Great Britain	2:01.05	
13	S1 L1	Petra Dallmann	Germany	2:01.20	
14	S2 L2	Tomoko Nagai	Japan	2:01.69	
15	S1 L7	Mariana Brochado	Brazil	2:01.74	
16	S2 L8	Kim Hyun-Joo	South Korea	2:01.88	

=== Preliminaries ===
Rank	Heat+Lane	Swimmer	Nation	Time	Notes
1	H7 L4	Lindsay Benko	United States	1:58.84	q
2	H9 L4	Yang Yu	China	2:00.32	q
3	H8 L6	Josefin Lillhage	Sweden	2:00.33	q
4	H8 L5	Elka Graham	Australia	2:00.36	q
5	H7 L3	Melanie Marshall	Great Britain	2:00.41	q
6	H7 L5	Solenne Figuès	France	2:00.46	q
6	H8 L4	Alena Popchanka	Belarus	2:00.46	q
8	H9 L3	Martina Moravcová	Slovakia	2:00.55	q
9	H7 L2	Tomoko Nagai	Japan	2:00.62	q
10	H9 L2	Rhi Jeffrey	United States	2:00.72	q
11	H9 L5	Xu Yanwei	China	2:00.82	q
12	H9 L8	Mariana Brochado	Brazil	2:01.17	q
13	H7 L6	Zoi Dimoschaki	Greece	2:01.28	q
13	H9 L6	Petra Dallmann	Germany	2:01.28	q
15	H7 L7	Kim Hyun-Joo	South Korea	2:01.50	q
16	H8 L3	Karen Pickering	Great Britain	2:01.57	q
17	H8 L2	Kirsten Thomson	Australia	2:01.78	
18	H6 L6	Helen Norfolk	New Zealand	2:02.21	
19	H6 L5	Paulina Barzycka	Poland	2:02.25	
20	H6 L1	Elina Partõka	Estonia	2:02.27	
21	H8 L1	Monique Ferreira	Brazil	2:02.44	
22	H9 L1	Alessa Ries	Germany	2:02.55	
23	H8 L7	Julie Hjorth-Hansen	Denmark	2:02.56	
24	H8 L8	Hanna Miluska	Switzerland	2:02.65	
25	H6 L8	Petra Banović	Croatia	2:02.77	
26	H6 L3	Ida Mattsson	Sweden	2:02.91	
27	H6 L2	Polina Shornikova	Russia	2:02.92	
28	H5 L2	Florencia Szigeti	Argentina	2:03.13	
29	H9 L7	Alison Fitch	New Zealand	2:03.17	
30	H7 L8	Daria Parshina	Russia	2:03.21	
31	H5 L7	Nicole Zahnd	Switzerland	2:03.46	
32	H6 L4	Nina Van Koeckhoven	Belgium	2:03.63	
33	H5 L1	Anja Čarman	Slovenia	2:04.03	
34	H5 L3	Vesna Stojanovska	Macedonia	2:04.09	
35	H6 L7	Marianne Limpert	Canada	2:04.14	
36	H5 L4	Melissa Corfe	South Africa	2:04.73	
37	H5 L8	Lára Hrund Bjargardóttir	Iceland	2:04.90	
38	H4 L3	Maria Albert	Estonia	2:05.40	
39	H5 L6	Eleni Kosti	Greece	2:06.09	
40	H4 L4	Agnese Ozoliņa	Latvia	2:07.13	
41	H5 L5	Pilin Tachakittiranan	Thailand	2:07.18	
42	H4 L5	Sze Hang Yu	Hong Kong	2:07.86	
43	H3 L4	Lauren Roets	South Africa	2:08.99	
44	H4 L1	Diana Lopez	Venezuela	2:09.68	
45	H4 L2	Golda Marcus	El Salvador	2:10.39	
46	H4 L7	Khadija Ciss	Senegal	2:10.66	
47	H3 L7	Anna-Liza Mopio	Papua New Guinea	2:11.05	
48	H3 L5	Yelena Skalinskaya	Kazakhstan	2:11.38	
49	H4 L8	Johana Rodriguez	Costa Rica	2:11.61	
50	H3 L3	Carolina Cerqueda	Andorra	2:11.97	
51	H4 L6	Andrea de Leon	Uruguay	2:12.54	
52	H2 L4	Ambica Iyengar	India	2:13.63	
53	H3 L2	Magdalena Sutanto	Indonesia	2:14.35	
54	H3 L6	Roberta Callus	Malta	2:14.72	
55	H3 L8	Shrone Austin	Seychelles	2:15.47	
56	H3 L1	Man Wai Fong	Macau	2:17.48	
57	H2 L2	Jakie Wellman	Zambia	2:18.91	
58	H2 L5	Roshendra Vrolijk	Aruba	2:20.42	
59	H2 L6	Sade Daal	Suriname	2:22.26	
60	H2 L7	Eva Donde	Kenya	2:26.69	
61	H2 L3	Ghazal El Jobeili	Lebanon	2:31.83	
62	H1 L5	Tojohanitra Andriamanjatoarimanana	Madagascar	2:36.40	
63	H1 L3	N. Ravojanahary	Madagascar	2:40.12	
-	-	Brittany Reimer	Canada	DNS	
-	-	Genevieve Meledje Lasm Quissoh	Ivory Coast	DNS	
