= Swimming at the 2004 Summer Olympics – Women's 50 metre freestyle =

Women's 50 metre freestyle at the Games of the XXVIII Olympiad
- Venue: Athens Olympic Aquatic Centre
- Date: August 20, 2004 (heats & semifinals); August 21, 2004 (final)
- Competitors: 75 from 67 nations
- Winning time: 24.58

Medalists
1st place, gold medalist(s)		Inge de Bruijn	Netherlands
2nd place, silver medalist(s)		Malia Metella	France
3rd place, bronze medalist(s)		Lisbeth Lenton	Australia

The women's 50 metre freestyle event at the 2004 Olympic Games was contested at the Olympic Aquatic Centre of the Athens Olympic Sports Complex in Athens, Greece on August 20 and 21.

Dutch swimmer and world record holder Inge de Bruijn managed to defend her title in this event, outside her record time of 24.58 seconds. The silver medal was awarded to France's Malia Metella, with a time of 24.89 seconds. Australia's Lisbeth Lenton, who finished behind Metella by two hundredths of a second (0.02), took home the bronze at 24.91. This was also the final appearance for de Bruijn at the Olympics, before she retired from her swimming career in 2007.

== Records ==
Prior to this competition, the existing world and Olympic records were as follows.

World record	Inge de Bruijn (NED)	24.13	Sydney, Australia	22 September 2000
Olympic record	Inge de Bruijn (NED)	24.13	Sydney, Australia	22 September 2000

== Results ==
=== Heats ===
Rank	Heat	Lane	Name	Nationality	Time	Notes
1	10	4	Inge de Bruijn	Netherlands	24.66	Q
2	9	3	Kara Lynn Joyce	United States	25.06	Q
3	10	3	Malia Metella	France	25.21	Q
4	10	2	Sviatlana Khakhlova	Belarus	25.24	Q
5	8	4	Michelle Engelsman	Australia	25.28	Q
5	10	5	Marleen Veldhuis	Netherlands	25.28	Q
7	9	4	Lisbeth Lenton	Australia	25.31	Q
8	9	2	Alison Sheppard	Great Britain	25.36	Q
9	10	7	Flávia Cazziolato	Brazil	25.40	Q
10	9	5	Therese Alshammar	Sweden	25.42	Q
11	8	5	Jenny Thompson	United States	25.50	Q
12	8	8	Eileen Coparropa	Panama	25.57	Q
13	8	1	Nery Mantey Niangkouara	Greece	25.62	Q
14	9	6	Rebeca Gusmão	Brazil	25.64	Q
15	8	7	Dorothea Brandt	Germany	25.67	Q
16	9	1	Cristina Chiuso	Italy	25.68	Q
17	8	6	Martina Moravcová	Slovakia	25.69	
18	10	6	Sandra Völker	Germany	25.74	
19	9	8	Judith Draxler	Austria	25.82	
20	8	3	Anna-Karin Kammerling	Sweden	25.85	
21	10	8	Ana Belén Palomo	Spain	25.92	
22	7	6	Jeanette Ottesen	Denmark	25.95	
23	8	2	Olga Mukomol	Ukraine	25.96	
24	9	7	Hanna-Maria Seppälä	Finland	26.01	
25	7	2	Sandra Kazíková	Czech Republic	26.18	
26	7	3	Triin Aljand	Estonia	26.19	
27	7	5	Arlene Semeco	Venezuela	26.20	
28	7	7	Ryu Yoon-ji	South Korea	26.26	
28	5	6	Vanessa García	Puerto Rico	26.26	
30	6	2	Lara Heinz	Luxembourg	26.35	
31	6	5	Ragnheidur Ragnarsdóttir	Iceland	26.36	
32	7	8	Zhu Yingwen	China	26.45	
33	7	4	Martha Matsa	Greece	26.46	
34	5	5	Alison Fitch	New Zealand	26.56	
35	6	6	Anna Gostomelsky	Israel	26.72	
36	5	2	Sara Isaković	Slovenia	26.81	
37	6	3	Florencia Szigeti	Argentina	26.84	
38	7	1	Sharntelle McLean	Trinidad and Tobago	26.86	
39	6	1	Yelena Skalinskaya	Kazakhstan	27.04	
40	6	8	Shikha Tandon	India	27.08	
41	6	7	Zsuzsanna Csobánki	Hungary	27.09	
41	5	3	Nieh Pin-chieh	Chinese Taipei	27.09	
43	5	1	Miroslava Najdanovski	Serbia and Montenegro	27.18	
44	5	7	Alia Atkinson	Jamaica	27.21	
45	5	8	Nikia Deveaux	Bahamas	27.36	
46	4	4	Melanie Slowing	Guatemala	27.44	
47	6	4	Yu Ning Elaine Chan	Hong Kong	27.48	
48	4	5	Maria Tregubova	Moldova	28.40	
49	4	3	Roshendra Vrolijk	Aruba	28.43	
50	4	2	Jakie Wellman	Zambia	28.56	
51	4	6	Geraldine Arce	Nicaragua	28.73	
52	4	7	Menaka de Silva	Sri Lanka	28.93	
53	4	8	Dohi Éliane Droubry	Ivory Coast	29.23	
54	4	1	Sade Daal	Suriname	29.27	
55	3	6	Ermelinda Zamba	Mozambique	29.34	
56	3	7	Aina Andriamanjatoarimanana	Madagascar	29.35	
57	3	5	Eva Donde	Kenya	29.47	
58	3	4	Diane Etiennette	Mauritius	30.00	
59	3	3	Rubab Raza	Pakistan	30.10	
60	3	1	Rovena Marku	Albania	30.51	
61	1	5	Doli Akhter	Bangladesh	30.72	
62	3	2	Samar Nassar	Jordan	30.83	
63	2	4	Sameera Al Bitar	Bahrain	31.00	
63	2	5	Ghazal El Jobeili	Lebanon	31.00	
65	3	8	Aminath Rouya Hussain	Maldives	31.26	
65	2	6	Tracy Ann Route	Federated States of Micronesia	31.26	
67	2	7	Christal Clashing	Antigua and Barbuda	31.55	
68	1	3	Monika Bakale	Republic of the Congo	31.61	
69	2	3	Han Choi	Malawi	31.62	
70	2	2	Evelyn Otto	Palau	33.04	
71	2	1	Ket Sivan	Cambodia	34.62	
72	1	4	Amira Edrahi	Libya	34.67	
73	2	8	Vilayphone Vongphachanh	Laos	36.57	
	5	4	Dominique Diezi	Switzerland	DNS	
	10	1	Federica Pellegrini	Italy	DNS	

=== Semifinals ===
==== Semifinal 1 ====
Rank	Lane	Name	Nationality	Time	Notes
1	4	Kara Lynn Joyce	United States	25.06	Q
2	2	Therese Alshammar	Sweden	25.15	Q
3	3	Marleen Veldhuis	Netherlands	25.27	
4	1	Rebeca Gusmão	Brazil	25.31	
5	6	Alison Sheppard	Great Britain	25.36	
6	7	Eileen Coparropa	Panama	25.37	
6	8	Cristina Chiuso	Italy	25.37	
8	5	Sviatlana Khakhlova	Belarus	25.47	

==== Semifinal 2 ====
Rank	Lane	Name	Nationality	Time	Notes
1	4	Inge de Bruijn	Netherlands	24.56	Q
2	6	Lisbeth Lenton	Australia	24.90	Q
3	5	Malia Metella	France	24.99	Q
4	3	Michelle Engelsman	Australia	25.13	Q
5	2	Flávia Cazziolato	Brazil	25.17	Q
5	7	Jenny Thompson	United States	25.17	Q
7	1	Nery Mantey Niangkouara	Greece	25.27	
8	8	Dorothea Brandt	Germany	25.83	

=== Final ===
Rank	Lane	Swimmer	Nation	Time	Notes
1st place, gold medalist(s)	4	Inge de Bruijn	Netherlands	24.58	
2nd place, silver medalist(s)	3	Malia Metella	France	24.89	
3rd place, bronze medalist(s)	5	Lisbeth Lenton	Australia	24.91	
4	7	Therese Alshammar	Sweden	24.93	
5	6	Kara Lynn Joyce	United States	25.00	
6	2	Michelle Engelsman	Australia	25.06	
7	1	Jenny Thompson	United States	25.11	
8	8	Flávia Cazziolato	Brazil	25.20	
