= Swimming at the 2001 World Aquatics Championships – Women's 50 metre freestyle =

Women's 50 metre freestyle at the 2001 FINA World Championships
- Dates: 28 July 2001 (heats, semifinals); 29 July 2001 (final)
- Competitors: 64 from 49 nations
- Winning time: 24.47 seconds

Medalists
gold medal	Inge de Bruijn	Netherlands
silver medal	Therese Alshammar	Sweden
bronze medal	Sandra Völker	Germany

The women's 50 metre freestyle event at the 2001 World Aquatics Championships was held on 28 (heats and semifinals) and 29 July 2001 (final) at the Fukuoka, Japan.

== Records ==
Prior to this competition, the existing world and competition records were as follows:

World record	Inge de Bruijn (NED)	24.13	Sydney, Australia	22 September 2000
Championship record	Le Jingyi (CHN)	24.51	Rome, Italy	11 September 1994

The following record was established during the competition:

Date	Round	Name	Nation	Time	Record
28 July	Semifinal 2	Inge de Bruijn	Netherlands	24.45	CR

== Results ==
=== Heats ===
Rank	Swimmer	Nation	Time	Notes
1	Inge de Bruijn	Netherlands	24.79	Q
2	Alison Sheppard	United Kingdom	25.07	Q
3	Tammie Spatz-Stone	United States	25.11	Q
4	Sandra Völker	Germany	25.37	Q
5	Sumika Minamoto	Japan	25.62	Q
6	Olga Mukomol	Ukraine	25.68	Q
7	Therese Alshammar	Sweden	25.72	Q
8	Katrin Meissner	Germany	25.79	Q
9	Rosalind Brett	United Kingdom	25.82	Q
9	Martina Moravcová	Slovakia	25.82	Q
11	Jana Kolukanova	Estonia	25.83	Q
12	Haley Cope	United States	25.84	Q
12	Alena Popchanka	Belarus	25.84	Q
14	Michelle Engelsman	Australia	25.87	Q
15	Judith Draxler	Austria	25.92	Q
16	Ekaterina Kibalo	Russia	25.93	Q
17	Xue Han	China	25.95	
18	Anna-Karin Kammerling	Sweden	25.96	
18	Laura Nicholls	Canada	25.96	
20	Sarah Ryan	Australia	25.97	
21	Agata Korc	Poland	26.01	
22	Urska Slapsak	Slovenia	26.06	
23	Inna Yaitskaya	Russia	26.09	
24	Cecilia Vianini	Italy	26.11	
25	Vivienne Rignall	New Zealand	26.14	
26	Leah Martindale	Barbados	26.15	
27	Aliaksandra Herasimenia	Belarus	26.16	
28	Cristina Chiuso	Italy	26.17	
29	Hanna-Maria Seppälä	Finland	26.23	
30	Yingwen Zhu	China	26.30	
31	Flavia Delaroli-Cazziolato	Brazil	26.32	
31	Mette Jacobsen	Denmark	26.32	
33	Wilma van Rijn van Hofwegen	Netherlands	26.35	
34	Julie Douglas	Ireland	26.37	
35	Tomoko Nagai	Japan	26.43	
36	Ilona Hlaváčková	Czech Republic	26.57	
37	Dominique Diezi	Switzerland	26.60	
38	Karen Egdal	Denmark	26.64	
39	Florina Herea	Romania	26.74	
40	Nina van Koeckhoven	Belgium	26.79	
41	Anna Gostomelsky	Israel	26.86	
42	Elina Partoka	Estonia	26.99	
43	Jacqueline Lim	Singapore	27.12	
44	Chantal Gibney	Ireland	27.13	
45	Sharntelle McLean	Trinidad and Tobago	27.21	
46	Maria Wong	Peru	27.68	
47	Nicole Hayes	Palau	27.99	
48	Yi Chieh Sung	Chinese Taipei	28.01	
49	Shikha Tandon	India	28.02	
50	Weng Tong Cheong	Macau	28.09	
51	Ayeisha Collymore	Trinidad and Tobago	28.11	
52	Reshma Millet	India	28.20	
53	Wai Man Lam	Macau	28.51	
54	Chin Kuei Lang	Chinese Taipei	28.68	
55	Xenavee Pangelinan	Northern Mariana Islands	28.78	
56	Yuliana Mikheeva	Armenia	29.15	
57	Khadija Ciss	Senegal	29.37	
58	Xenia Peni	Papua New Guinea	30.65	
59	Monika Bakale	Republic of the Congo	30.78	
60	Lasm Quissoh Genevieve Meledje	Ivory Coast	31.01	
61	Miriam Nakolo	Kenya	31.59	
62	Amanda Onyango	Kenya	31.66	
63	Larissa Inangorore	Burundi	37.02	
64	Lkhundev Bilguun	Mongolia	DNS	

=== Semifinals ===
Rank	Name	Nationality	Time	Notes
1	Inge de Bruijn	Netherlands	24.45	Q, CR
2	Therese Alshammar	Sweden	24.87	Q
3	Tammie Spatz-Stone	United States	25.11	Q
4	Alison Sheppard	United Kingdom	25.13	Q
5	Sandra Völker	Germany	25.20	Q
6	Haley Cope	United States	25.26	Q
7	Alena Popchanka	Belarus	25.45	Q
8	Katrin Meissner	Germany	25.48	Q
9	Sumika Minamoto	Japan	25.49	
10	Olga Mukomol	Ukraine	25.53	
11	Ekaterina Kibalo	Russia	25.64	
12	Jana Kolukanova	Estonia	25.65	
13	Michelle Engelsman	Australia	25.77	
13	Martina Moravcová	Slovakia	25.77	
15	Rosalind Brett	United Kingdom	25.81	
15	Judith Draxler	Austria	25.81	

=== Final ===
Rank	Name	Nationality	Time	Notes
1st place, gold medalist(s)	Inge de Bruijn	Netherlands	24.47	
2nd place, silver medalist(s)	Therese Alshammar	Sweden	24.88	
3rd place, bronze medalist(s)	Sandra Völker	Germany	24.96	
4	Alison Sheppard	United Kingdom	25.00	
5	Tammie Spatz-Stone	United States	25.10	
6	Haley Cope	United States	25.25	
7	Katrin Meissner	Germany	25.40	
7	Alena Popchanka	Belarus	25.73	
