= Swimming at the 2001 World Aquatics Championships – Women's 100 metre freestyle =

Women's 100 metre freestyle at the 2001 FINA World Championships
- Dates: 24 July 2001 (heats, semifinals); 25 July 2001 (final)
- Competitors: 61
- Winning time: 54.18 seconds

Medalists
gold medal	Inge de Bruijn	Netherlands
silver medal	Katrin Meissner	Germany
bronze medal	Sandra Völker	Germany

The women's 100 metre freestyle event at the 2001 World Aquatics Championships took place 25 July. The heats and semifinals were held on 24 July.

== Records ==
Prior to this competition, the existing world and competition records were as follows:

World record	Inge de Bruijn (NED)	53.77	Sydney, Australia	20 September 2000
Championship record	Le Jingyi (CHN)	54.01	Rome, Italy	5 September 1994

== Results ==
=== Heats ===
Rank	Swimmer	Nation	Time	Notes
1	Johanna Sjöberg	Sweden	55.44	Q
1	Yanwei Xu	China	55.44	Q
3	Katrin Meissner	Germany	55.51	Q
4	Sarah Ryan	Australia	55.55	Q
5	Alena Popchanka	Belarus	55.63	Q
6	Inge de Bruijn	Netherlands	55.65	Q
7	Martina Moravcová	Slovakia	55.72	Q
8	Cecilia Vianini	Italy	55.80	Q
9	Sandra Völker	Germany	55.89	Q
10	Mette Jacobsen	Denmark	56.03	Q
11	Sumika Minamoto	Japan	56.08	Q
12	Maritza Correia	United States	56.13	Q
13	Laura Nicholls	Canada	56.17	Q
14	Otylia Jędrzejczak	Poland	56.24	Q
15	Luisa Striani	Italy	56.36	Q
16	Colleen Lanne	United States	56.38	Q
17	Olga Mukomol	Ukraine	56.39	
17	Hanna-Maria Seppälä	Finland	56.39	
19	Lori Munz	Australia	56.44	
20	Inna Yaitskaya	Russia	56.47	
21	Marianne Limpert	Canada	56.55	
22	Natallia Hadjiloizou	Belarus	56.56	
23	Elina Partoka	Estonia	56.65	
24	Jana Kolukanova	Estonia	56.73	
25	Tomoko Nagai	Japan	56.75	
26	Florencia Szigeti	Argentina	56.91	
27	Leah Martindale	Barbados	56.93	
28	Anna Gostomelsky	Israel	57.07	
29	Xue Han	China	57.11	
30	Ekaterina Kibalo	Russia	57.31	
31	Nicole Zahnd	Switzerland	57.33	
32	Dominique Diezi	Switzerland	57.50	
32	Wilma van Hofwegen	Netherlands	57.50	
34	Nina van Koeckhoven	Belgium	57.53	
35	Vivienne Rignall	New Zealand	57.59	
36	Chantal Gibney	Ireland	57.65	
37	Judith Draxler	Austria	57.77	
38	Florina Herea	Romania	57.83	
39	Julie Douglas	Ireland	58.02	
40	Agata Korc	Poland	58.44	
41	Flavia Delaroli-Cazziolato	Brazil	58.65	
42	Jacqueline Lim	Singapore	59.17	
43	Lára Hrund Bjargardóttir	Iceland	59.36	
44	Sung Yi-chieh	Chinese Taipei	59.62	
45	Maria Wong	Peru	59.84	
46	Shikha Tandon	India	59.96	
47	Sharntelle McLean	Trinidad and Tobago	1:00.33	
48	Nicole Hayes	Palau	1:00.40	
49	Reshma Millet	India	1:00.65	
50	Huei-Yun Lee	Chinese Taipei	1:01.42	
51	Xenavee Pangelinan	Northern Mariana Islands	1:01.57	
52	Weng Tong Cheong	Macau	1:01.69	
53	Khadija Ciss	Senegal	1:02.54	
54	Yuliana Mikheeva	Armenia	1:05.64	
55	Miriam Nakolo	Kenya	1:06.75	
56	Lasm Quissoh Genevieve Meledje	Ivory Coast	1:07.21	
57	Myagmarsuren Delgermaa	Mongolia	1:08.43	
58	Monika Bakale	Republic of the Congo	1:10.38	
59	Amanda Onyango	Kenya	1:11.86	
–	Therese Alshammar	Sweden	DNS	
–	Ayeisha Collymore	Trinidad and Tobago	DSQ	

=== Semifinals ===
Rank	Swimmer	Nation	Time	Notes
1	Inge de Bruijn	Netherlands	54.47	Q
2	Katrin Meissner	Germany	55.15	Q
3	Martina Moravcová	Slovakia	55.19	Q
3	Alena Popchanka	Belarus	55.19	Q
5	Sandra Völker	Germany	55.28	Q
6	Yanwei Xu	China	55.33	Q
7	Sarah Ryan	Australia	55.37	Q
8	Johanna Sjöberg	Sweden	55.43	Q
9	Maritza Correia	United States	55.60	
10	Cecilia Vianini	Italy	55.80	
11	Sumika Minamoto	Japan	55.90	
12	Otylia Jędrzejczak	Poland	55.97	
13	Colleen Lanne	United States	55.98	
14	Laura Nicholls	Canada	56.23	
15	Mette Jacobsen	Denmark	56.30	
16	Luisa Striani	Italy	56.33	

=== Final ===
Rank	Name	Nationality	Time	Notes
1st place, gold medalist(s)	Inge de Bruijn	Netherlands	54.18	
2nd place, silver medalist(s)	Katrin Meissner	Germany	55.07	
3rd place, bronze medalist(s)	Sandra Völker	Germany	55.11	
4	Martina Moravcová	Slovakia	55.12	
5	Alena Popchanka	Belarus	55.19	
6	Yanwei Xu	China	55.38	
7	Johanna Sjöberg	Sweden	55.42	
8	Sarah Ryan	Australia	55.53	
