= Han Choi =

Malawian swimmer (born 1989)

Personal information
- Full name: Han Choi
- National team: Malawi
- Born: 20 May 1989 (age 37)
- Height: 1.67 m (5 ft 6 in)
- Weight: 65 kg (143 lb)

Sport
- Sport: Swimming
- Strokes: Freestyle

Han Choi (born May 20, 1989) is a Malawian swimmer, who specialized in sprint freestyle events. Choi became one of the first Malawian swimmers to compete at the 2004 Summer Olympics in Athens.

== Life ==
She qualified for the women's 50 m freestyle, by receiving a Universality place from FINA in an entry time of 32.33. She challenged six other swimmers in heat two, including 14-year-olds Sameera Al-Bitar of Bahrain and Christal Clashing of Antigua and Barbuda. She posted a lifetime best of 31.62 to earn a fourth spot by 0.62 of a second behind joint winners Al-Bitar and Ghazal El Jobeili of Lebanon. Choi failed to advance into the semifinals, as she placed sixty-ninth overall on the last day of preliminaries.
