= Swimming at the 2005 World Aquatics Championships – Women's 100 metre butterfly =

Women's 100m Butterfly at the 2005 FINA World Aquatics Championships
- Dates: 24 July (prelims and semifinals), 25 July (final)
- Competitors: 60 from 42 nations
- Winning time: 57.23 seconds

Medalists
gold medal	Jessicah Schipper	Australia
silver medal	Libby Lenton	Australia
bronze medal	Otylia Jędrzejczak	Poland

The Women's 100 Butterfly event at the 11th FINA World Aquatics Championships swam on 24–25 July 2005 in Montreal, Canada. Preliminary and Semifinal heats swam on 24 July. The Final swam in the evening session of 25 July.

At the start of the event, the existing World (WR) and Championships (CR) records were:

- WR: 56.61 swum by Inge de Bruijn (Netherlands) on 17 September 2000 in Sydney, Australia
- CR: 57.96 swum by Jenny Thompson (USA) on 21 July 2003 in Barcelona, Spain

== Results ==
=== Final ===
Place	Swimming	Nation	Time	Notes
1	Jessicah Schipper	Australia	57.23	CR
2	Libby Lenton	Australia	57.37	
3	Otylia Jędrzejczak	Poland	58.57	
4	Rachel Komisarz	USA	58.80	
5	Mary DeScenza	USA	58.87	
6	Inge Dekker	Netherlands	59.01	
7	Martina Moravcová	Slovakia	59.25	
8	ZHOU Yafei	China	59.42	

=== Semifinals ===
Rank	Heat + Lane	Swimmer	Nation	Time	Notes
1	S2 L4	Jessicah Schipper	Australia	57.75	q, CR
2	S1 L5	Lisbeth Lenton	Australia	58.11	q
3	S2 L5	Otylia Jędrzejczak	Poland	58.19	q
4	S1 L4	Inge Dekker	Netherlands	58.73	q
5	S2 L3	Mary DeScenza	USA	58.88	q
6	S1 L3	Rachel Komisarz	USA	58.93	q
7	S2 L6	Martina Moravcová	Slovakia	59.02	q
8	S2 L2	ZHOU Yafei	China	59.17	q
9	S1 L6	Annika Mehlhorn	Germany	59.39	
10	S1 L2	Ambra Migliori	Italy	59.54	
11	S2 L7	Yuko Nakanishi	Japan	59.65	
12	S2 L7	Natalia Sutiagina	Russia	59.95	
13	S1 L1	Francesca Segat	Italy	1:00.01	
14	S2 L8	Audrey Lacroix	Canada	1:00.33	
15	S1 L8	Rosalind Brett	Great Britain	1:00.34	
16	S2 L1	Mandy Loots	South Africa	1:00.36	

=== Preliminaries ===
Rank	Heat + Lane	Swimmer	Nation	Time	Notes
1	H6 L4	Jessicah Schipper	Australia	57.91	q, CR
2	H6 L5	Inge Dekker	Netherlands	58.48	q
3	H8 L4	Otylia Jędrzejczak	Poland	58.83	q
4	H7 L4	Libby Lenton	Australia	59.05	q
5	H8 L3	Mary DeScenza	United States	59.13	q
6	H7 L5	Rachel Komisarz	United States	59.19	q
7	H8 L5	Martina Moravcová	Slovakia	59.33	q
8	H7 L6	Annika Mehlhorn	Germany	59.36	q
9	H6 L2	ZHOU Yafei	China	59.42	q
10	H7 L2	Ambra Migliori	Italy	59.60	q
11	H6 L6	Natalia Sutiagina	Russia	59.98	q
12	H8 L2	Yuko Nakanishi	Japan	1:00.00	q
13	H8 L6	Mandy Loots	South Africa	1:00.09	q
14	H7 L3	Francesca Segat	Italy	1:00.35	q
15	H6 L1	Audrey Lacroix	Canada	1:00.36	q
15	H8 L7	Rosalind Brett	Great Britain	1:00.36	q
17	H7 L8	Ayako Doi	Japan	1:00.72	
18	H7 L7	Beatrix Boulsevicz	Hungary	1:00.79	
18	H8 L1	Elizabeth Coster	New Zealand	1:00.79	
20	H6 L3	Malia Metella	France	1:00.91	
21	H5 L5	Diane Bui Duyet	France	1:01.01	
22	H6 L7	Lyubov Korol	Ukraine	1:01.04	
23	H8 L8	Gabriella Fagundez	Sweden	1:01.07	
24	H6 L8	Kelly Stefanyshyn	Canada	1:01.10	
25	H7 L1	Aleksandra Urbanczyk	Poland	1:01.60	
26	H5 L6	Vasilisa Vladykina	Russia	1:01.69	
27	H5 L2	Hang Yu Su	Hong Kong	1:01.81	
28	H3 L5	Heather Brand	Zimbabwe	1:01.91	
29	H4 L2	Jeanette Ottesen	Denmark	1:02.23	
30	H5 L8	Denisa Smolenová	Slovakia	1:02.36	
31	H4 L3	You-Ri Kwon	South Korea	1:02.49	
32	H5 L1	Hannah Wilson	Hong Kong	1:02.50	
33	H5 L4	Joscelin Yeo	Singapore	1:02.51	
34	H4 L8	Annette Hansen	Denmark	1:02.63	
35	H5 L3	Hye Ra Choi	South Korea	1:02.69	
36	H5 L7	Jingzhi Tang	China	1:03.02	
37	H4 L6	Chanelle Van Wyk	South Africa	1:03.05	
38	H4 L5	Chin-Kuei Yang	Chinese Taipei	1:03.70	
39	H4 L7	Georgina Toomey	New Zealand	1:03.82	
40	H3 L4	Irina Shlemova	Uzbekistan	1:03.93	
41	H4 L1	Natnapa Prommuenwai	Thailand	1:03.95	
42	H3 L3	Marcela Kubalčíková	Czech Republic	1:04.03	
43	H4 L4	Bernadette Lee	Singapore	1:04.33	
44	H3 L2	Yamilé Bahamonde	Ecuador	1:05.52	
45	H3 L7	Phan Thi Hanh	Vietnam	1:05.60	
46	H3 L1	Gisela Morales	Guatemala	1:05.79	
47	H2 L4	Lacken Malateste	Tahiti	1:05.87	
48	H2 L5	Fatima Valderrama	Peru	1:05.88	
49	H3 L6	Angela Galea	Malta	1:05.97	
50	H3 L8	Ashley Aitken	Bermuda	1:06.32	
51	H2 L2	Davina Mangion	Malta	1:07.18	
52	H2 L3	Ana Guadalupe Hernandez Duarte	El Salvador	1:07.28	
53	H2 L7	Sharon Fajardo	Honduras	1:07.54	
54	H2 L1	Ileana Ivette Murillo Argueta	El Salvador	1:07.63	
55	H2 L8	Simona Muccioli	San Marino	1:08.14	
56	H1 L5	Melissa Vincent	Mauritius	1:08.26	
57	H2 L6	Cheok Mei Ma	Macau	1:08.64	
58	H1 L4	Binta Zahra Diop	Senegal	1:09.30	
59	H1 L6	Sana Wahid	Pakistan	1:15.74	
--	--	Jessica Vieira	Mozambique	DNS	
