= 1998 European Short Course Swimming Championships – Women's 50 metre freestyle =

The finals and the qualifying heats of the Women's 50 metres Freestyle event at the 1998 European Short Course Swimming Championships were held on the second day of the competition, on Saturday 12 December 1998 in Sheffield, England.

== Finals ==
RANK	FINAL	TIME
Gold medal	Inge de Bruijn (NED)	24.41
Silver medal	Katrin Meissner (GER)	24.79
Bronze medal	Sue Rolph (GBR)	24.80
4.	Alison Sheppard (GBR)	24.96
5.	Therese Alshammar (SWE)	25.06
6.	Angela Postma (NED)	25.35
6.	Anna-Karin Kammerling (SWE)	25.35
8.	Sophia Skou (DEN)	25.43

== Qualifying Heats ==
RANK	HEATS RANKING	TIME
1.	Inge de Bruijn (NED)	24.38
2.	Sandra Völker (GER)	25.01
3.	Alison Sheppard (GBR)	25.08
4.	Therese Alshammar (SWE)	25.12
5.	Sue Rolph (GBR)	25.14
6.	Anna-Karin Kammerling (SWE)	25.37
7.	Katrin Meissner (GER)	25.38
7.	Angela Postma (NED)	25.38
9.	Sophia Skou (DEN)	25.49
10.	Tonia Machaira (GRE)	25.73
11.	Judith Draxler (AUT)	25.74
12.	Ursa Slapsak (SLO)	25.82
13.	Cristina Chiuso (ITA)	25.83
14.	Dominique Diezi (SUI)	25.93
15.	Alena Popchanka (BLR)	25.99
16.	Liesbet Dreesen (BEL)	26.01
17.	Blanca Cerón (ESP)	26.03
18.	Ivana Walterová (SVK)	26.04
19.	Ilona Hlaváčková (CZE)	26.12
20.	Lara Heinz (LUX)	26.26
21.	Fabienne Dufour (BEL)	26.41
22.	Marja Heikkila (FIN)	26.45
23.	Elin Sigurdardottir (ISL)	26.55
24.	Chantal Gibney (IRL)	26.55
25.	Dita Zelviene (LTU)	26.75
26.	Kolbrun Kristjansdottir (ISL)	26.78
27.	Gabrijela Ujcic (CRO)	26.83
28.	Ana Alegria (POR)	26.89
29.	Natalia Kodajová (SVK)	27.03
30.	Emma Robinson (IRL)	27.09
31.	Ludivine Chouipe (FRA)	27.12
32.	Eirini Kosta (GRE)	27.15
33.	Dagmar Majerová (CZE)	27.56
—	Metka Šparovec (SLO)	DSQ
