= Swimming at the 2006 Central American and Caribbean Games – Women's 100 metre butterfly =

The women's 100m Butterfly event at the 2006 Central American and Caribbean Games occurred on Wednesday, Saturday 22, 2006 at the S.U. Pedro de Heredia Aquatic Complex in Cartagena, Colombia.

Records at the time of the event were:

- World Record: 56.61, Inge de Bruijn (Netherlands), Sydney, Australia, September 17, 2000.
- Games Record: 1:03.01, Siobhan Cropper (Trinidad & Tobago), 1998 Games in Maracaibo (Sep.12.1998).

== Results ==
=== Final ===
Place	Swimmer	Country	Time	Note
1	Teresa Victor Lopez	Mexico	1:02.46	GR
2	Maria Alejandra Rodriguez	Venezuela	1:03.59	
3	Alma Paulina Arciniega Castro	Mexico	1:03.63	
4	Sharntelle McLean	Trinidad and Tobago	1:04.42	
5	Anay Gutierrez Solenza	Cuba	1:04.49	
6	Gisela Morales	Guatemala	1:04.69	
7	Andreina Rojas Jimenez	Venezuela	1:04.84	
8	Vanessa de Lourdes Martinez Colomer	Puerto Rico	1:04.93	

=== Preliminaries ===
Rank	Swimmer	Country	Time	Note
1	Teresa Victor Lopez	Mexico	1:03.83	Q
2	Alma Paulina Arciniega Castro	Mexico	1:04.34	Q
3	Maria Alejandra Rodriguez	Venezuela	1:04.66	Q
4	Gisela Morales	Guatemala	1:04.96	Q
5	Sharntelle McLean	Trinidad and Tobago	1:05.01	Q
6	Carolina Colorado Henao	Colombia	1:05.56	Q
7	Anay Gutierrez Solenza	Cuba	1:05.60	Q
8	Andreina Rojas Jimenez	Venezuela	1:05.67	Q
9	Vanessa de Lourdes Martinez Colomer	Puerto Rico	1:06.01	
10	Heather Roffey	Cayman Islands	1:06.15	
11	Sharon Paola Fajardo Sierra	Honduras	1:06.23	
12	Lura Lucia Paz Chavez	Honduras	1:06.49	
13	Arianna Vanderpool-Wallace	Bahamas	1:06.50	
14	Ileana Ivette Murillo Argueta	El Salvador	1:06.51	
15	Alia Atkinson	Jamaica	1:06.71	
16	Marsha Nicole Watson	Barbados	1:06.84	
17	Dalia Massiel Tórrez Zamora	Nicaragua	1:06.87	
18	Marcela Martinez	Colombia	1:09.43	
19	Priscilla Jannasch	Suriname	1:10.53	
20	Sade Daal	Suriname	1:10.61	
21	Michael-Anne Myrvang	Virgin Islands	1:11.05	
22	Jodie Foster	Cayman Islands	1:15.80	
--	Ana Guadalupe Hernandez Duarte	El Salvador	DNS	
--	Alana Dillette	Bahamas	DNS	
