= Tracy Ann Route =

Micronesian swimmer

Personal information
- Full name: Tracy Ann Route
- National team: Micronesia
- Born: 23 February 1985 (age 41)
- Height: 1.57 m (5 ft 2 in)
- Weight: 43 kg (95 lb)

Sport
- Sport: Swimming
- Strokes: Freestyle, butterfly

Tracy Ann Route (born February 23, 1985) is a Micronesian former swimmer, who specialized in sprint freestyle and butterfly events. She is a two-time Olympian (2000 and 2004), and holds numerous Pacific age group records in the freestyle and butterfly (both 50 and 100 m). She was the first woman to represent the Federated States of Micronesia at the Olympics.

When Micronesia marked its Olympic debut at the 2000 Summer Olympics in Sydney, Route competed as a 15-year-old in the women's 100 m butterfly. Swimming in heat one, she rounded out a field to last place and forty-ninth overall against Swaziland's Lisa de la Motte and Malta's Angela Galea with a slowest time of 1:13.53.

At the 2004 Summer Olympics in Athens, Route decided to swim only for the 50 m freestyle. She received a Universality place from FINA in an entry time of 32.44. She challenged six other swimmers in heat two, including 14-year-olds Sameera Al-Bitar of Bahrain and Christal Clashing of Antigua and Barbuda. She posted a lifetime best of 31.26 to earn a third spot by 0.26 of a second behind joint winners Al-Bitar and Ghazal El Jobeili of Lebanon. Route failed to advance into the semifinals, as she shared a sixty-fifth place tie with Maldives' Aminath Rouya Hussain on the last day of prelims.
