= Ket Sivan =

Cambodian swimmer

Personal information
- Full name: Ket Sivan
- National team: Cambodia
- Born: 6 February 1981 (age 45) Phnom Penh, Cambodia
- Height: 1.59 m (5 ft 3 in)
- Weight: 50 kg (110 lb)

Sport
- Sport: Swimming
- Strokes: Freestyle

Ket Sivan (born February 6, 1981) is a Cambodian swimmer, who specialized in sprint freestyle events. Ket qualified for the women's 50 m freestyle, by receiving a Universality place from FINA in an entry time of 34.68. She challenged six other swimmers in heat two, including 14-year-olds Sameera Al-Bitar of Bahrain and Christal Clashing of Antigua and Barbuda. She posted a lifetime best of 34.62 to save a seventh spot over Laos' Vilayphone Vongphachanh by nearly two seconds. Ket failed to advance into the semifinals, as she placed seventy-first overall out of 75 swimmers on the last day of preliminaries.

In early 2013, Ket was named deputy officer under the athletes' commission for the National Olympic Committee of Cambodia.
