= 1998 European Short Course Swimming Championships – Women's 50 metre butterfly =

Swimming competition

The finals and the qualifying heats of the Women's 50 metres Butterfly event at the 1998 European Short Course Swimming Championships were held on the first day of the competition, on Friday 11 December 1998 in Sheffield, England.

== Finals ==
RANK	FINAL	TIME
Gold medal	Inge de Bruijn (NED)	26.09 ER
Silver medal	Anna-Karin Kammerling (SWE)	26.30
Bronze medal	Johanna Sjöberg (SWE)	26.76
4.	Martina Moravcová (SVK)	26.85
5.	Marja Pärssinen (FIN)	27.02
6.	Mette Jacobsen (DEN)	27.16
7.	Ditte Jensen (DEN)	27.27
8.	Fabienne Dufour (BEL)	27.53

== Qualifying Heats ==
RANK	HEATS RANKING	TIME
1.	Inge de Bruijn (NED)	26.54 ER
2.	Martina Moravcová (SVK)	26.84
3.	Anna-Karin Kammerling (SWE)	26.86
4.	Marja Pärssinen (FIN)	27.03
5.	Ditte Jensen (DEN)	27.42
5.	Johanna Sjöberg (SWE)	27.42
7.	Mette Jacobsen (DEN)	27.46
8.	Fabienne Dufour (BEL)	27.53
9.	Franziska van Almsick (GER)	27.56
10.	Katrin Jaeke (GER)	27.73
11.	Angela Postma (NED)	27.75
11.	Yvetta Hlaváčová (CZE)	27.75
13.	Alena Popchanka (BLR)	27.84
14.	Anna Uryniuk (POL)	27.86
15.	Blanca Cerón (ESP)	27.88
16.	Hanna Kapachenia (BLR)	27.92
17.	Caroline Foot (GBR)	27.96
18.	Rosalind Brett (GBR)	27.97
19.	Metka Šparovec (SLO)	28.01
20.	Ursa Slapsak (SLO)	28.08
20.	Olena Grytsuk (UKR)	28.08
22.	Ania Gustamelski (ISR)	28.13
23.	Liesbet Dreesen (BEL)	28.17
24.	Judith Draxler (AUT)	28.29
25.	Elin Sigurdardottir (ISL)	28.36
26.	Gabrijela Ujčić (CRO)	28.68
27.	Anja Poetsch (AUT)	28.73
28.	María Peláez (ESP)	28.83
29.	Maria Papadopoulou (CYP)	29.01
30.	Maria Santos (POR)	29.02
31.	Michaela Lastuvková (CZE)	29.55
32.	Laura Nuudi (EST)	30.06
