= Michelle Engelsman =

Australian swimmer

Personal information
- Full name: Michelle Engelsman
- National team: Australia
- Born: 9 December 1979 (age 46) Rio de Janeiro, Brazil
- Height: 1.77 m (5 ft 10 in)
- Weight: 73 kg (161 lb)

Sport
- Sport: Swimming
- Strokes: Freestyle
- College team: Kenyon College; University of Arizona
Medal record
Women's swimming
Representing Australia
Universiade
Silver medal – second place	2003 Daegu	50 m freestyle
World Championships (SC)
Silver medal – second place	2006 Shanghai	4×100 m freestyle

Michelle Engelsman (born 9 December 1979) is an Australian former competition swimmer who specialised in sprint freestyle events. She was a silver medalist in the 50-metre freestyle at the 2003 Summer Universiade, and also, a sixth-place finalist in the same event at the 2004 Summer Olympics.

== Personal life and early career ==
Born in Rio de Janeiro, Brazil, Engelsman moved around the world with her family, and had been inculcated in diversity and cultural backgrounds. After living in the United States for eight years, Engelsman spent her years in high school studying at the America International of Zürich in Switzerland. She continued her swimming career upon her admission at Kenyon College in Gambier, Ohio, and eventually won the title in the 50-metre freestyle at the 1998 NCAA Division III state swimming championships.

In May 1999, Engelsman left Kenyon College to pursue her dream of making the Australian Olympic team. Upon her return to Australia, she continued her studies at the University of Queensland, and trained with Scott Volkers and Stephan Widmar for her rigorous preparation at the 2000 Summer Olympics. Sadly, Engelsman failed to qualify for the team, as she placed fifth in the Olympic trials. Following her major upset, Engelsman returned for the second time to the United States, where she completed an undergraduate degree at the University of Arizona, and captured another success from the NCAA Division I championships.

== International career ==
In 2002, Engelsman enrolled in an honours' degree in chemistry at the University of Sydney, and trained under Brian Sutton and Steve Alderman. Engelsman first appeared on the international scene at the 2003 Summer Universiade in Daegu, South Korea, where she won the silver medal in the 50-metre freestyle by more than three tenths of a second (0.30) behind Ukraine's Olga Mukomol, with a time of 25.89 seconds. Following her success in the Universiade, Engelsman became an official pioneer and member of The Race Club in Islamorada, Florida (founded by former Olympic medalist Gary Hall Sr.), where she spent numerous months of full preparation leading into the Australian Olympic trials.

At the Olympic trials, Engelsman challenged Lisbeth Lenton to set the world's third fastest qualified entry time of 24.80 seconds, and secure a second-place finish in the 50-metre freestyle final. Having attained an A-standard, Engelsman earned a spot on the Australian team for the Olympics.

Engelsman represented her parental nation Australia, as a first-time Olympian, at the 2004 Summer Olympics in Athens, where she competed in the women's 50-metre freestyle, along with Lenton. In the final round of the competition, Engelsman barely out touched U.S. swimmer, four-time Olympian, and twelve-time medalist Jenny Thompson for a sixth-place finish by five hundredths of a second (0.05), with a time of 25.06 seconds.

Since 2004, Engelsman had competed at the Pan Pacific Swimming Championships, and at the FINA World Cup series, but finished outside the medals. She also helped out her Australian team to reach the final, and capture the silver medal in the freestyle relay at the 2006 FINA World Short Course Championships in Shanghai, China. Following her retirement from professional swimming in 2008, Engelsman was honoured for her "Speedo Services to the Australian Swimming Team" at the Telstra Swimmer of the Year Awards in Sydney.
