= Lisa de la Motte =

Swazi swimmer

Personal information
- Full name: Lisa de la Motte
- National team: Swaziland
- Born: 16 April 1985 (age 41) Mbabane, Swaziland
- Height: 1.65 m (5 ft 5 in)
- Weight: 60 kg (132 lb)

Sport
- Sport: Swimming
- Strokes: Butterfly

Lisa de la Motte (born April 16, 1985) is a Swazi former swimmer, who specialized in butterfly events. De la Motte competed for Swaziland in the women's 100 m butterfly at the 2000 Summer Olympics in Sydney. She received a ticket from FINA, under a Universality program, in an entry time of 1:08.86. She participated in heat one against two other swimmers Angela Galea of Malta and Tracy Ann Route of Micronesia. Coming from second at the final turn, she edged out Galea on the final stretch to pick up a top seed in a Swazi record of 1:06.70. De la Motte's effortless triumph was not enough to put her through to the semifinals, as she placed forty-fifth overall on the first day of prelims.
