= Menaka de Silva =

Sri Lankan swimmer

Personal information
- Full name: Menaka Srimani de Silva
- National team: Sri Lanka
- Born: 26 January 1985 (age 41) Colombo, Sri Lanka
- Height: 1.65 m (5 ft 5 in)
- Weight: 65 kg (143 lb)

Sport
- Sport: Swimming
- Strokes: Freestyle

Menaka Srimani de Silva (born January 26, 1985) is a Sri Lankan swimmer, who specialized in sprint freestyle events. She held a Sri Lankan record from the national championships in 2003 (28.28), until it was eventually broken by 13-year-old Kimiko Raheen nine years later (2012).

De Silva qualified for the women's 50 m freestyle at the 2004 Summer Olympics in Athens, by receiving a Universality place from FINA, in an entry time of 28.48. She challenged seven other swimmers in heat four, including 31-year-old Melanie Slowing of Guatemala. She raced to seventh place by two tenths of a second behind Nicaragua's Geraldine Arce in 28.93. De Silva failed to advance into the semifinals, as she placed fifty-second overall out of 75 swimmers on the last day of preliminaries.
