= Amira Edrahi =

Libyan swimmer (born 1986)

Personal information
- Born: October 15, 1986 (age 39)

Sport
- Sport: Swimming

Amira Edrahi (Arabic: أميرة ادراحي; born October 15, 1986) is a Libyan swimmer, who specialized in sprint freestyle events.

== Career ==
Edrahi qualified for the women's 50 m freestyle at the 2004 Summer Olympics in Athens, by receiving a Universality place from FINA, in an entry time of 39.00. At the 2004 Olympics, she participated in heat one against two other swimmers Doli Akhter of Bangladesh and Monika Bakale of Congo. She posted a lifetime best of 34.67 to finish last in a small field of three by nearly four seconds behind winner Akhter. Edrahi failed to advance into the semifinals, as she placed seventy-second overall out of 75 swimmers on the last day of preliminaries. Her Olympic appearance was the first for a Libyan woman swimmer since Soad and Nadia Fezzani at the 1980 Summer Olympics in Moscow.
