= Ángela San Juan =

Spanish swimmer

Personal information
- Full name: Ángela San Juan Cisneros
- Nationality: Spanish
- Born: 23 November 1983 (age 41); Madrid, Spain

Sport
- Sport: Swimming

Ángela San Juan Cisneros (Note: In this Spanish name, the first or paternal surname is San Juan and the second or maternal family name is Cisneros.) (born 23 November 1983 in Madrid) is a Spanish swimmer who competed in the 2008 Summer Olympics.
