= Stephan Widmar =

Australian swimming coach

Stephan Widmer is a swimming coach for the Commercial Swimming Club and the Australian swimming team.

Of German-Swiss origin, Widmer moved to Australia and succeeded Scott Volkers as the head coach at CSC, which had produced a long line of Australian representatives, including World Champions Susie O'Neill and Samantha Riley.

== Notable students ==
- Leisel Jones (2004–2007)
- Kylie Palmer
- Jessicah Schipper (2008–)
- Melanie Schlanger
- Libby Trickett ( –2008)
- Christian Sprenger
- Tarnee White
