= Marina Chepurkova =

Russian swimmer

Personal information
- Born: 10 August 1980 (age 45) Moscow, Russian SFSR, Soviet Union
- Height: 1.77 m (5 ft 10 in)
- Weight: 60 kg (130 lb)

Sport
- Sport: Swimming
- Club: SKIF Moscow

Marina Petrovna Chepurkova (Russian: Марина Петровна Чепуркова; born 10 August 1980) is a Russian freestyle swimmer. She competed at the 2000 Summer Olympics in the 4×100 m freestyle relay and finished in 10th place.
