= Yekaterina Kibalo =

Russian swimmer

Personal information
- Born: March 18, 1982 (age 44) Krasnodar, Russian SFSR, Soviet Union
- Height: 1.70 m (5 ft 7 in)
- Weight: 61 kg (134 lb)

Sport
- Sport: Swimming
- Club: Volga Club

Yekaterina Kibalo (Russian: Екатерина Кибало; born 18 March 1982) is a Russian swimmer. She competed at the 2000 Summer Olympics in the 50 m, 100 m and 4×100 m freestyle events and finished in 33rd, 20th and 10th place, respectively.
