= Larissa Inangorore =

Burundian swimmer (born 1984)

Personal information
- Full name: Larissa Inangorore
- National team: Burundi
- Born: 1 April 1984 (age 42)
- Height: 1.60 m (5 ft 3 in)
- Weight: 62 kg (137 lb)

Sport
- Sport: Swimming
- Strokes: Freestyle

Larissa Inangorore (born April 1, 1984) is a Burundian former swimmer, who specialized in sprint freestyle events. Inangorore qualified for the women's 100 m freestyle at the 2004 Summer Olympics in Athens, by receiving a Universality place from FINA. She posted an invitation time of 1:26.31 at the All-Africa Games in Abuja, Nigeria. She participated in the first heat against two other swimmers Carolina Cerqueda of Andorra and Gloria Koussihouede. She finished behind Cerqueda in second spot by a wide 23.56-second margin in her personal best of 1:23.90. Inangorore failed to advance into the semifinals, as she placed forty-ninth overall in the preliminaries.
