= Ermelinda Zamba =

Mozambican swimmer (born 1981)

Personal information
- Full name: Ermelinda Zamba
- National team: Mozambique
- Born: 28 August 1981 (age 44) Maputo, Mozambique
- Height: 1.76 m (5 ft 9 in)
- Weight: 63 kg (139 lb)

Sport
- Sport: Swimming
- Strokes: Freestyle

Ermelinda Zamba (born 28 August 1981) is a Mozambican former swimmer, who specialized in sprint freestyle events. Zamba qualified for the women's 50 m freestyle at the 2004 Summer Olympics in Athens, by receiving a Universality place from FINA, in an entry time of 30.33. She cleared a 30-second barrier, and posted a lifetime best of 29.34 to lead the third heat, edging out Madagascar's Aina Andriamanjatoarimanana in a close race by one hundredth of a second (0.01). Zamba failed to advance into the semifinals, as she placed fifty-fifth overall out of 75 swimmers on the last day of preliminaries.
