= Agnese Ozoliņa =

Latvian swimmer

Personal information
- Nickname: Grandma
- National team: Latvia
- Born: 12 November 1979 (age 46) Jelgava, Latvian SSR, Soviet Union
- Height: 1.76 m (5 ft 9 in)
- Weight: 69 kg (152 lb)

Sport
- Sport: Swimming
- Strokes: Freestyle
- Club: JSPS Jelgava
- College team: Kenyon College (U.S.)

Agnese Ozoliņa (born 12 November 1979) is a Latvian former swimmer, who specialized in sprint freestyle events. She is a three-time Olympian (1996, 2000, and 2004), a multiple-time Latvian and Baltic record holder, and a seven-time All-North Coast Atlantic Conference swimmer. She is also a varsity swimmer for the Kenyon Ladies, and an economics graduate at Kenyon College in Gambier, Ohio.

Ozolina made her first Latvian team, as a 16-year-old teen, at the 1996 Summer Olympics in Atlanta, Georgia, where she competed in the women's 50 m freestyle. Swimming in heat two, she edged out three-time Olympian Akiko Thomson of the Philippines (1988, 1992, and 1996) to take a seventh spot and forty-seventh overall by less than 0.16 of a second in 27.65.

On her second Olympic appearance in Sydney 2000, Ozolina failed to reach the top 16 in any of her individual events, finishing forty-fifth in the 50 m freestyle (27.28), and forty-fourth in the 100 m freestyle (59.28).

Eight years after competing in her first Olympics, Ozolina qualified for her third Latvian team, as a 24-year-old, at the 2004 Summer Olympics in Athens. She set a Latvian record, and eclipsed a FINA B-cut of 58.04 (100 m freestyle) from the USA Swimming Grand Prix in Indianapolis, Indiana. In the 100 m freestyle, Ozolina challenged seven other swimmers on the same heat as Sydney, including Kazakhstan's Yelena Skalinskaya (Maryland Terrapins) and Trinidad and Tobago's Linda McEachrane (Tulane Green Wave). Ozolina raced to fourth place by 0.11 of a second behind McEachrane in 59.03. Ozolina failed to advance into the semifinals, as she placed forty-third overall in the preliminaries.
