= Melanie Slowing =

Guatemalan swimmer (born 1973)

Personal information
- Full name: Melanie Slowing de Montenegro
- National team: Guatemala
- Born: 10 January 1973 (age 53) Guatemala City, Guatemala
- Height: 1.60 m (5 ft 3 in)
- Weight: 59 kg (130 lb)

Sport
- Sport: Swimming
- Strokes: Freestyle

Melanie Slowing de Montenegro (born January 10, 1973) is a Guatemalan former swimmer, who specialized in sprint freestyle events. Slowing qualified for the women's 50 m freestyle, as a 31-year-old, at the 2004 Summer Olympics in Athens, by breaking a Guatemalan record and posting a FINA B-cut of 26.89 from the Central American and Caribbean Championships in Mexico City. She topped the fourth heat by less than 0.04 of a second ahead of Moldova's Maria Tregubova in 27.44. Slowing failed to advance into the semifinals, as she placed forty-sixth overall out of 75 swimmers on the last day of preliminaries.

She is the sister of Karen Slowing who competed in the Olympics in 1984.
