= Eva Donde =

Kenyan swimmer (born 1989)

Personal information
- Full name: Eva Donde
- National team: Kenya
- Born: 17 October 1989 (age 36)
- Height: 1.76 m (5 ft 9 in)
- Weight: 63 kg (139 lb)

Sport
- Sport: Swimming
- Strokes: Freestyle
- Club: Otter Club
- Coach: Whitney Pragassa

Eva Donde (born October 17, 1989) is a Kenyan swimmer, who specialized in sprint freestyle events. She held Kenyan records in long and short course 50 m freestyle, until they were both broken by Achieng Ajulu-Bushell in 2009. Donde is also a member of Otter Club, and is trained by her longtime coach Whitney Pragassa.

Donde qualified for the women's 50 m freestyle, as a 14-year-old, at the 2004 Summer Olympics in Athens, by receiving a Universality place from FINA, in an entry time of 29.83. She challenged seven other swimmers in heat three, including 13-year-old Tojohanitra Andriamanjatoarimanana of Madagascar. She posted a lifetime best of 29.47 to take a third seed by 0.14 of a second behind winner Ermelinda Zamba of Mozambique. Donde failed to advance into the semifinals, as she placed fifty-seventh overall out of 75 swimmers on the last day of preliminaries.
