= Geraldine Arce =

Nicaraguan swimmer (born 1988)

Personal information
- Full name: Geraldine Arce Vanegas
- National team: Nicaragua
- Born: 1 February 1988 (age 38) Managua, Nicaragua
- Height: 1.60 m (5 ft 3 in)
- Weight: 60 kg (132 lb)

Sport
- Sport: Swimming
- Strokes: Freestyle

Geraldine Arce Vanegas (born 1 February 1988) is a Nicaraguan swimmer, who specialized in sprint freestyle events. Arce qualified for the women's 50 m freestyle, as a 16-year-old, at the 2004 Summer Olympics in Athens, by receiving a Universality place from FINA, in an entry time of 28.15. She challenged seven other swimmers in heat four, including 31-year-old Melanie Slowing of Guatemala. She edged out Sri Lanka's Menaka de Silva to take a sixth spot by two tenths of a second (0.20) in 28.73. Arce failed to advance into the semifinals, as she placed fifty-first overall out of 75 swimmers on the last day of preliminaries.
