= Angela Galea =

Maltese swimmer

Personal information
- Full name: Angela Galea
- National team: Malta
- Born: 5 May 1983 (age 43) Pietà, Malta
- Height: 1.67 m (5 ft 6 in)
- Weight: 58 kg (128 lb)

Sport
- Sport: Swimming
- Strokes: Butterfly
- Coach: Maurizio Cocconi

Angela Galea (born May 5, 1983) is a Maltese former swimmer, who specialized in butterfly events. She is a two-time Olympian (2000 and 2004), a three-time champion at the Games of the Small States of Europe (GSSE), and a multiple-time Maltese record holder in both freestyle and butterfly (50, 100, and 200 m). In preparation for her Games, she was trained for the Italian Olympic team, under the guidance of head coach Maurizio Cocconi.

Galea made her first Maltese team, as a 17-year-old teen, at the 2000 Summer Olympics in Sydney. Swimming in heat one of the women's 100 m butterfly, she posted a Maltese record of 1:07.88 to pick up a second seed and forty-sixth overall against Swaziland's Lisa de la Motte and Micronesia's Tracy Ann Route.

At the 2004 Summer Olympics in Athens, Galea qualified again for the 100 m butterfly by receiving a Universality place from FINA. She lowered a Maltese record and posted her entry time of 1:03.62 from GSSE in Valletta, held a year before the Olympics. She participated in the same heat as Sydney against five other swimmers, including 16-year-old Kateryna Zubkova of Ukraine. Despite a good recovery in the last 50 metres, Galea came up short in fourth place with a time of 1:05.47, just a 3.25-second margin behind winner Zubkova. Galea failed to advance into the semifinals, as she placed thirty-sixth overall on the first day of preliminaries.
