= Christal Clashing =

Antiguan swimmer (born 1989)

Christal Clashing O'Reilly
Personal information
- Full name: Christal Ariana Clashing O'Reilly
- National team: Antigua and Barbuda
- Born: 8 September 1989 (age 36) San José, Costa Rica
- Height: 1.73 m (5 ft 8 in)
- Weight: 51 kg (112 lb)

Sport
- Sport: Swimming
- Strokes: Freestyle
- Club: Wadadli Aquatic Racers
- Coach: Edith O'Reilly Clashing

Christal Ariana Clashing O'Reilly (born 8 September 1989) is an Antiguan swimmer, who specialized in sprint freestyle events. She also completed a Trans-Atlantic crossing as part of an all-woman team. As a one-time Olympian (2004), she is coached and trained by her mother Edith O'Reilly Clashing, who founded the Wadadli Aquatic Racers (WAR), an elite swim club in Antigua. Her sister Karin O'Reilly Clashing competed in the 50-metre freestyle at the 2012 Summer Olympics in London.

Eight years before her sister Karin participated, Clashing qualified for the same event, 50-metre freestyle, at the 2004 Summer Olympics in Athens, as a 14-year-old swimmer from Antigua. She received a Universality place from FINA in an entry time of 34.36. She challenged six other swimmers in heat two, including Bahrain's Sameera Al-Bitar, who shared the same age with Clashing. She posted a lifetime best of 31.55 to earn a fourth spot by 0.55 of a second behind joint winners Al-Bitar and Ghazal El Jobeili of Lebanon. Clashing failed to advance into the semifinals, as she placed 67th overall on the last day of preliminaries.
