= Yelena Skalinskaya =

Kazakhstani swimmer

Personal information
- Full name: Yelena Alexeyevna Skalinskaya
- National team: Kazakhstan
- Born: 28 July 1987 (age 38) Jambyl, Kazakh SSR, Soviet Union
- Height: 1.74 m (5 ft 9 in)
- Weight: 60 kg (132 lb)

Sport
- Sport: Swimming
- Strokes: Freestyle, breaststroke
- College team: University of Maryland (U.S.)

Yelena Alexeyevna Skalinskaya (Kazakh: Елена Алексеевна Скалинская; born July 28, 1987) is a Kazakh former swimmer, who specialized in sprint freestyle and breaststroke events. She is a five-time national champion and record holder in the same stroke. Skalinskaya is a member of the swimming team for Maryland Terrapins, along with her fellow country teammate Marina Mulyayeva.

Skalinskaya qualified for two swimming events at the 2004 Summer Olympics in Athens, by clearing FINA B-standard entry times of 26.50 (50 m freestyle) and 58.00 (100 m freestyle) from the Kazakhstan Open Championships in Almaty. In the 100 m freestyle, Skalinskaya challenged seven other swimmers on the second heat, including three-time Olympian Agnese Ozoliņa of Latvia. She raced to second place and forty-first overall by more than a second behind winner Vanessa García of Puerto Rico in 58.56. In the 50 m freestyle, Skalinskaya placed thirty-ninth overall on the last day of preliminaries. Swimming in heat six, she edged out India's Shikha Tandon to take a fifth spot by 0.04 of a second, outside her entry time of 27.04.
