= Sade Daal =

Surinamese swimmer

Personal information
- Full name: Sade Daal
- National team: Suriname
- Born: 30 September 1988 (age 37) Paramaribo, Suriname
- Height: 1.70 m (5 ft 7 in)
- Weight: 53 kg (117 lb)

Sport
- Sport: Swimming
- Strokes: Freestyle

Sade Daal (born 30 September 1988) is a Surinamese swimmer, who specialized in sprint freestyle events. Daal qualified for the women's 50 m freestyle, as a 15-year-old, at the 2004 Summer Olympics in Athens, by receiving a Universality place from FINA, in an entry time of 29.14. She challenged seven other swimmers in heat four, including 31-year-old Melanie Slowing of Guatemala. She rounded out the field to last place in 29.27, just 0.13 of a second off her personal best. Daal failed to advance into the semifinals, as she placed fifty-fourth overall out of 75 swimmers on the last day of preliminaries.
