= Libby Trickett =

Australian swimmer (born 1985)

Libby Trickett OAM
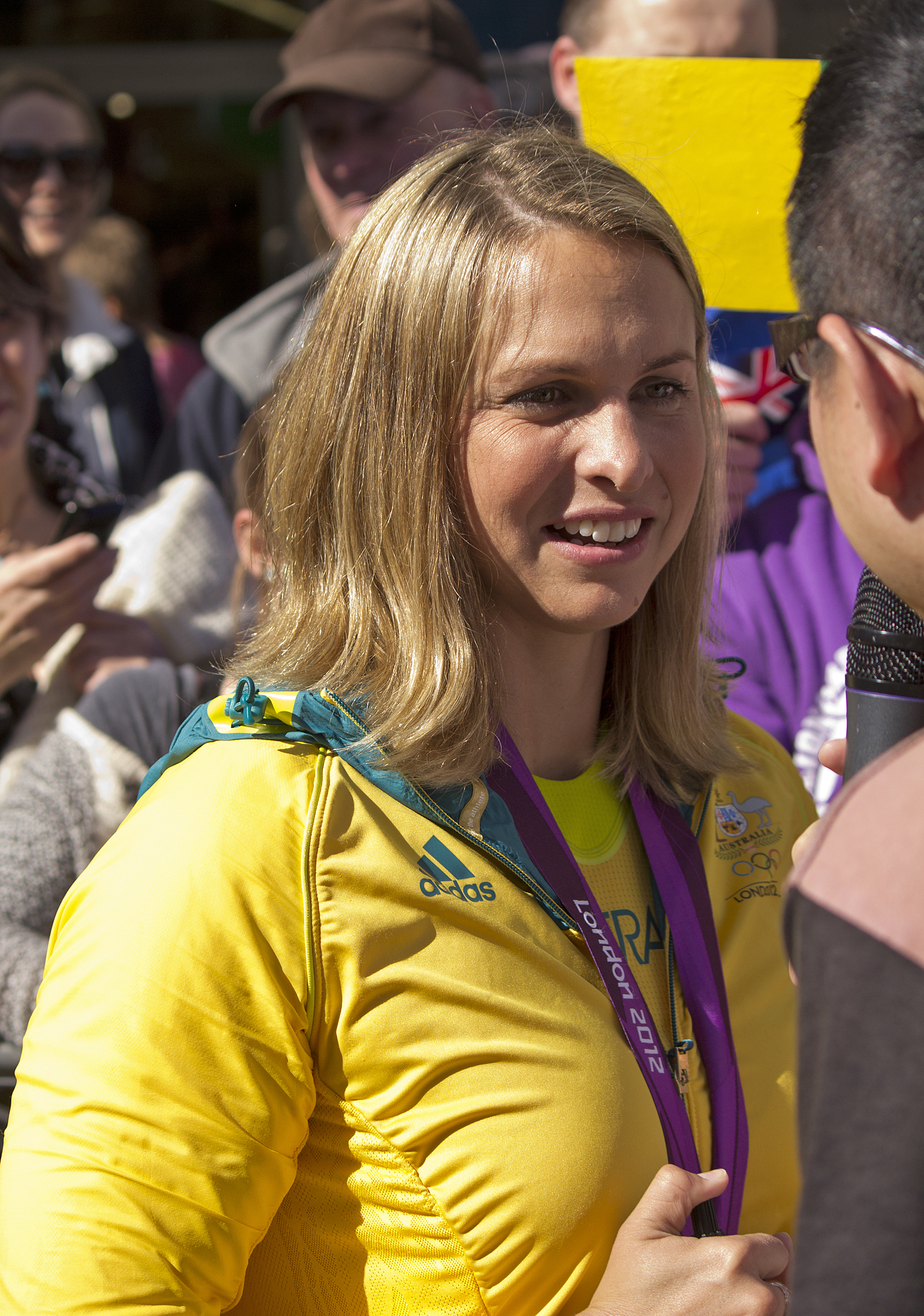
- Trickett interviewed at Welcome Home parade in Sydney

Personal information
- Full name: Lisbeth Constance Lenton
- National team: Australia
- Born: 28 January 1985 (age 41) Townsville, Queensland, Australia
- Height: 1.67 m (5 ft 6 in)
- Weight: 60 kg (132 lb)
- Spouse: Luke Trickett (2007–present)

Sport
- Sport: Swimming
- Strokes: Freestyle, butterfly
- Club: Commercial
Medal record
Event	1st	2nd	3rd
Olympic Games	4	1	2
World Championships (LC)	8	3	4
World Championships (SC)	7	3	2
Commonwealth Games	5	2	0
Total	24	9	8
Women's swimming
Representing Australia
Olympic Games
Gold medal – first place	2004 Athens	4×100 m freestyle
Gold medal – first place	2008 Beijing	100 m butterfly
Gold medal – first place	2008 Beijing	4×100 m medley
Gold medal – first place	2012 London	4×100 m freestyle
Silver medal – second place	2008 Beijing	100 m freestyle
Bronze medal – third place	2004 Athens	50 m freestyle
Bronze medal – third place	2008 Beijing	4×100 m freestyle
World Championships (LC)
Gold medal – first place	2005 Montreal	50 m freestyle
Gold medal – first place	2005 Montreal	4×100 m freestyle
Gold medal – first place	2005 Montreal	4×100 m medley
Gold medal – first place	2007 Melbourne	50 m freestyle
Gold medal – first place	2007 Melbourne	100 m freestyle
Gold medal – first place	2007 Melbourne	100 m butterfly
Gold medal – first place	2007 Melbourne	4×100 m freestyle
Gold medal – first place	2007 Melbourne	4×100 m medley
Silver medal – second place	2005 Montreal	100 m butterfly
Silver medal – second place	2005 Montreal	4×200 m freestyle
Silver medal – second place	2009 Rome	4×100 m medley
Bronze medal – third place	2003 Barcelona	50 m freestyle
Bronze medal – third place	2003 Barcelona	4×100 m freestyle
Bronze medal – third place	2009 Rome	100 m freestyle
Bronze medal – third place	2009 Rome	4×100 m freestyle
World Championships (SC)
Gold medal – first place	2004 Indianapolis	100 m freestyle
Gold medal – first place	2004 Indianapolis	4×100 m medley
Gold medal – first place	2006 Shanghai	50 m freestyle
Gold medal – first place	2006 Shanghai	100 m freestyle
Gold medal – first place	2006 Shanghai	100 m butterfly
Gold medal – first place	2006 Shanghai	4×200 m freestyle
Gold medal – first place	2006 Shanghai	4×100 m medley
Silver medal – second place	2004 Indianapolis	50 m freestyle
Silver medal – second place	2004 Indianapolis	4×200 m freestyle
Silver medal – second place	2006 Shanghai	4×100 m freestyle
Bronze medal – third place	2004 Indianapolis	50 m butterfly
Bronze medal – third place	2004 Indianapolis	4×100 m freestyle
Commonwealth Games
Gold medal – first place	2006 Melbourne	50 m freestyle
Gold medal – first place	2006 Melbourne	100 m freestyle
Gold medal – first place	2006 Melbourne	4×100 m freestyle
Gold medal – first place	2006 Melbourne	4×200 m freestyle
Gold medal – first place	2006 Melbourne	4×100 m medley
Silver medal – second place	2006 Melbourne	200 m freestyle
Silver medal – second place	2006 Melbourne	100 m butterfly

Lisbeth Constance Trickett, OAM (née Lenton; born 28 January 1985) is an Australian retired competitive swimmer. She was a gold medallist at the 2004, 2008, and the 2012 Summer Olympics. She was the world record holder in the short-course (25m) 100-metre freestyle.

== Early life ==
Trickett was born in Townsville, Australia as the youngest of four children. She joined her first team at the age of 4. In 1995, her family relocated to Brisbane, and she started swimming under John Carew, who was then the coach of Kieren Perkins. In 2002, Trickett changed coaches again, moving to Stephan Widmar.

== Career ==
=== 2003 ===
In April 2003, Trickett competed at the Duel in the Pool in Indianapolis. She swam the second leg of the 4 × 100 m freestyle relay and split 54.07. Australia finished second in a time of 3:39.13, breaking the national record of 3:39.78 from 2002. Trickett swam the freestyle leg of the 4 × 100 m medley relay, splitting 54.56 to help Australia finish second in a time of 4:05.25; the team was later promoted to first place after the US were disqualified. Trickett then won the 100 m freestyle in a time of 54.71. She touched first in the 50 m freestyle in an Australian record time of 24.92, but was disqualified for a false start. Australia protested on the grounds that the video replay showed no movement before the starting signal, but the decision was upheld, as FINA's rules did not allow for video replay to be used as evidence. However, the official who made the ruling personally agreed with the protest, and subsequently petitioned Swimming Australia to ratify Trickett's time as a national record.

In July 2003, Trickett competed at the World Championships in Barcelona. She swam the first leg of the 4 × 100 m freestyle relay, recording a personal best time of 54.64. Australia won the bronze medal in a time of 3:38.83. She then won the bronze medal in the 50 m freestyle in a time of 25.08.

=== 2004 ===
Trickett competed at the 2004 Australian Championships in Sydney. In the 100 m freestyle, she swam 53.66 in the semifinals to break the world record of 53.77 set by the Netherlands' Inge de Bruijn in 2000. The following day, Trickett finished second behind Jodie Henry in a time of 54.17, qualifying for the 2004 Olympics in Athens. In the 50 m freestyle, Trickett's Australian record was broken by Michelle Engelsman, who went 24.83 in the heats. The following day, Trickett won the final and reclaimed the record in a time of 24.70.

At the 2004 Olympics, Trickett swam in the 4 × 100 m freestyle relay. In the heats, Australia set a new national record of 3:38.26 and qualified fastest for the final. In the final, Trickett split 53.57 on the second leg. Australia won the gold medal in a world record time of 3:35.94, lowering the mark set by Germany in 2002 by 0.06 seconds. Despite going into the Olympics as world record holder in the event, Trickett missed the final of the 100 m freestyle, recording a time of 55.17 to finish ninth. Additionally, her world record was broken by Henry. Trickett's final event was the 50 m freestyle, where she won the bronze medal in a time of 24.91.

=== 2005 ===
At the 2005 Australian Championships in Sydney, Trickett finished third in the 100 m freestyle in a time of 54.26, missing individual qualification in the event. She placed second in the 50 m freestyle, losing both the race and her national record to Alice Mills.

At the World Championships in Montreal, Trickett competed in the 4 × 100 m freestyle relay, splitting 53.54 on the anchor leg. Australia won the gold medal in a time of 3:37.32, breaking the championship record of 3:37.91 set by China in 1994. The following day, Trickett won the silver medal in the 100 m butterfly in a time of 57.37. On day 5, she swam the first leg of the 4 × 200 m freestyle relay, splitting a time of 1:57.06 to break the Australian record of 1:57.47 set by Susie O'Neill in 2000. Australia led for the first 700 m, but eventually won the silver medal, setting a new national record of 7:54.06. Trickett was selected to swim the freestyle leg in the final of the 4 × 100 m medley relay, over 100 m freestyle world champion Henry. Trickett split 53.13, anchoring Australia to the gold medal in a time of 3:57.47, breaking the championship record of 3:59.89 set by China in 2003. Trickett's final event was the 50 m freestyle, where she won the gold medal in a time of 24.59.

In August 2005, Trickett competed at the Australian Short Course Championships in Melbourne. In the semifinals of the 100 m freestyle, she swam 51.91, breaking the world record of 52.17 set by Therese Alshammar of Sweden in 2000. She broke the world record again in the final, improving the mark to 51.70.

In November 2005, Trickett competed at the FINA World Cup. At the Sydney stop, she set a new world record in the short course 200 m freestyle in a time of 1:53.29, lowering the mark of 1:54.04 set by the US' Lindsay Benko in 2002.

=== 2006 ===
At the 2006 Australian Championships in Melbourne, Trickett went 53.42 to reclaim the world record in the 100 m freestyle. This was later broken by Britta Steffen of Germany in August 2006.

Trickett competed at the 2006 Commonwealth Games in Melbourne. She won the gold medal in the 100 m butterfly with a games record time of 53.54. She won the silver medal in the 100 m butterfly in a time of 57.80. The following day, she won the gold medal in the 50 m freestyle in a games record time of 24.61. She then swam the first leg of the 4 × 100 m freestyle relay, splitting 53.74. Australia won gold in a games record time of 3:36.49, then the fourth-fastest time in history. On the final day, she swam the 4 × 100 m medley relay, splitting 52.87 on the freestyle leg. Australia set a new world record of 3:56.30, lowering the nation's own mark of 3:57.32 from 2004.

In August 2006, Trickett competed at the Australian Short Course Championships in Hobart. She swam 55.95 in the 100 m butterfly, breaking the world record of 56.34 set by the US' Natalie Coughlin in 2002.

=== 2007 ===
Trickett competed at the World Championships in Melbourne. She swam the first leg of the 4 × 100 m freestyle relay, splitting 53.42. This was tied for the second-fastest 100 m freestyle time in history, and was only slower than Steffen's world record of 53.30. Australia won the gold medal in a championship record time of 3:35.48. This was the second-fastest time in the relay's history, 0.26 seconds slower than Germany's world record from 2006. Trickett's next event was the 100 m butterfly, where she won the gold medal in 57.15, breaking the championship record of 57.23 set by compatriot Jessicah Schipper in 2005. In the 100 m freestyle, Trickett's championship record was broken by Coughlin in the semifinals. In the final, Trickett recorded 53.40 to win the gold medal, breaking her own national record and equalling Coughlin's championship record, again equalling the second-fastest time in history. Trickett's next event was the 4 × 100 m medley relay, where she split 52.83 on the freestyle leg. Australia won the gold medal in a world record time of 3:55.74. Trickett's final event was the 50 m freestyle, where she successfully defended her world title with a time of 24.53.

In April 2007, Trickett competed at the Duel in the Pool in Sydney. She swam the first leg of the mixed 4 × 100 m freestyle relay against the US' Michael Phelps. She split 52.99, which although was faster than Steffen's world record, was not ratified because the relay was not recognised as official event by FINA.

=== 2008 ===
In March 2008, Trickett competed at the Australian Championships in Sydney. She won the 100 m butterfly in 56.81, becoming the second woman to break 57 seconds in the event; her time was 0.20 seconds slower than de Bruijn's world record from 2000. In the 100 m freestyle, Trickett went 52.88, breaking Steffen's world record and becoming the first woman to officially break 53 seconds in the event. Her final event was the 50 m freestyle, which she won in 23.97, breaking the world record of 24.09 set by the Netherlands' Marleen Veldhuis.

In April 2008, Trickett competed at the Swimming Australia Grand Prix in Canberra. She went 55.74 in the short-course 100 m butterfly, breaking the world record of 55.89 set by compatriot Felicity Galvez earlier in the month.

In August 2008, Trickett competed at the 2008 Olympics in Beijing. She swam the anchor leg of the 4 × 100 m freestyle relay. She recorded a split of 52.34, then the fastest split in history. Australia won the bronze medal in a national record time of 3:35.05. Trickett's next event was the 100 m butterfly, which she won in an Australian record time of 56.73. She later swam the 100 m freestyle final, in which she was overtaken in the closing stages by Steffen; Trickett finished with the silver medal in a time of 53.16. In the 50 m freestyle, Trickett finished fourth in a time of 24.25. She concluded the competition with the 4 × 100 m medley relay. She split 52.53 on the freestyle leg, holding off the US' Dara Torres to win the gold medal in a world record time of 3:52.69.

In October 2008, Trickett moved to Sydney to train with Grant Stoelwinder, the coach of Eamon Sullivan.

=== 2009 ===
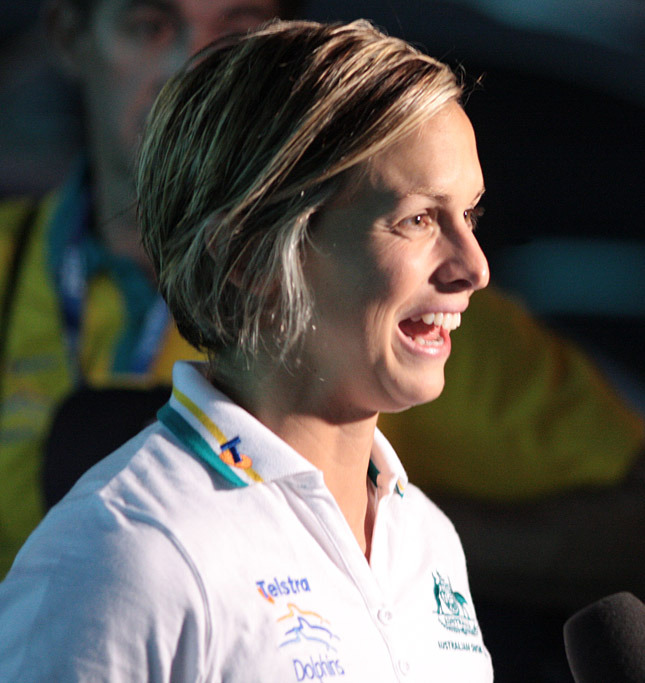
Trickett at the 2009 FINA World Championships

Trickett competed at the World Championships in Rome. Her first event was the 4 × 100 m freestyle relay. Although she was sponsored by Speedo, Trickett wore an Arena X-Glide for the race. She led off in an Australian record time of 52.62. Australia eventually won the bronze medal in 3:33.01, the third-fastest time in history. Trickett wore a Speedo LZR Racer for the remainder of the competition. She won the bronze medal in the 100 m freestyle in a time of 52.93. She swam the freestyle leg of the 4 × 100 m medley relay, losing to China who broke Australia's world record. Australia recorded a time of 3:52.58, the second-fastest time in history. Trickett later swam the 50 m freestyle, finishing sixth in a time of 24.19.

In August 2009, Trickett competed at the Australian Short Course Championships in Hobart. She broke the world record in the 100 m freestyle with a time of 51.01.

In December 2009, Trickett retired from swimming.

=== 2010–2013: Comeback ===
In September 2010, Trickett announced her return to swimming.

At the 2012 Australian Championships in Adelaide, Trickett finished fifth in the 100 m freestyle, qualifying for the Olympic team in the 4 × 100 m freestyle relay.

At the 2012 Olympics in London, Trickett swam the heats of the 4 × 100 m freestyle relay and was replaced in the final. Australia went on to win the gold medal, giving Trickett the fourth Olympic gold medal of her career.

In July 2013, Trickett retired for the second time, at the age of 28, due to a wrist injury.

== Personal life ==
In April 2007, Trickett was married at Taronga Zoo in Sydney. The couple had an exclusive photo deal with women's magazine New Idea, and later they had split the profits between three charities. She started competing under her married name at the 2008 Australian Championships.

In March 2015, Trickett and her husband announced that they were expecting their first child, due in September, after suffering a miscarriage in August 2014. She gave birth to a girl on 31 August 2015. Their second daughter was born on 23 February 2018.

In 2025, Trickett had a spontaneous coronary artery dissection.

== Awards and honours ==
- Order of Australia Medal (2005)
- Swimming Australia Swimmer of the Year (2007)
- Swimming World – Female Pacific Rim Swimmer of the Year (2007)
- Sport Australia Hall of Fame inductee (2016)
- International Swimming Hall of Fame inductee (2018)

== See also ==
- List of Olympic medalists in swimming (women)
- List of World Aquatics Championships medalists in swimming (women)
- List of Commonwealth Games medallists in swimming (women)
- World record progression 50 metres freestyle
- World record progression 100 metres butterfly
- World record progression 100 metres freestyle
- World record progression 200 metres freestyle
- World record progression 4 × 100 metres freestyle relay
- World record progression 4 × 100 metres medley relay

Records
Preceded by Marleen Veldhuis	Women's 50-metre freestyle world record-holder (long course); 29 March 2008 – 19 April 2009	Succeeded by Marleen Veldhuis
Preceded by Inge de Bruijn	Women's 100-metre freestyle world record-holder (long course); 31 March 2004 – 18 August 2004	Succeeded by Jodie Henry
Preceded by Jodie Henry	Women's 100-metre freestyle world record-holder (long course); 31 January 2006 – 2 August 2006	Succeeded by Britta Steffen
Preceded by Britta Steffen	Women's 100-metre freestyle world record-holder (long course); 27 March 2008 – 25 June 2009	Succeeded by Britta Steffen
Preceded by Therese Alshammar	Women's 100-metre freestyle world record-holder (short course); 8 August 2005 – 28 November 2015	Succeeded by Cate Campbell
Preceded by Lindsay Benko	Women's 200-metre freestyle world record-holder (short course); 19 November 2005 – 6 December 2008	Succeeded by Coralie Balmy
Preceded by Natalie Coughlin	Women's 100-metre butterfly world record-holder (short course); 27 August 2006 – 13 April 2008	Succeeded by Felicity Galvez
Preceded by Felicity Galvez	Women's 100-metre butterfly world record-holder (short course); 26 April 2008 – 12 August 2009	Succeeded by Jessicah Schipper
