= Lara Heinz =

Luxembourgish swimmer (born 1981)

Personal information
- Full name: Lara Heinz
- National team: Luxembourg
- Born: 27 May 1981 (age 45) Luxembourg City, Luxembourg
- Height: 1.74 m (5 ft 9 in)
- Weight: 66 kg (146 lb)

Sport
- Sport: Swimming
- Strokes: Freestyle
- Club: SSF Bonn 1905

Lara Heinz (born 27 May 1981) is a retired Luxembourgish swimmer, who specialized in sprint freestyle events. She is a two-time national record holder for both the long and short course freestyle (50 and 100 m).

Heinz made her Olympic debut, as a 19-year-old, at the 2000 Summer Olympics in Sydney, competing in both 50 and 100-metre freestyle. First, Heinz touched out Thailand's Pilin Tachakittiranan to take the fourth spot in heat three of the women's 100 m freestyle by 0.14 of a second in 58.55. In her second event, 50 m freestyle, Heinz snared the fifth spot by two hundredths of a second ahead of Fiji's Caroline Pickering in 26.55, but fell short to advance to the semifinals, placing thirty-fourth overall on the morning prelims. Heinz also served as Luxembourg's flag bearer in the opening ceremony.

Four years later, Heinz qualified for her second Luxembourgish team, as a 23-year-old, at the 2004 Summer Olympics in Athens. She attained B-standard entry times of 26.41 (50 m freestyle) and 57.14 (100 m freestyle) from the European Long Course Meet in Luxembourg. In the 100 m freestyle, Heinz edged out Hungary's Ágnes Mutina to take the fifth spot in heat three and thirty-sixth overall by 0.70 of a second, with a time of 57.40. In the 50 m freestyle, Heinz touched out Iceland's Ragnheiður Ragnarsdóttir to a fifth-heat triumph by a single hundredth margin (0.01), breaking a Luxembourgish record of 26.35 seconds. Her storming victory was not insufficiently enough to put her through the semifinals, as Heinz placed thirtieth out of 75 swimmers in the morning preliminaries.
