= Éliane Droubry =

Ivorian swimmer

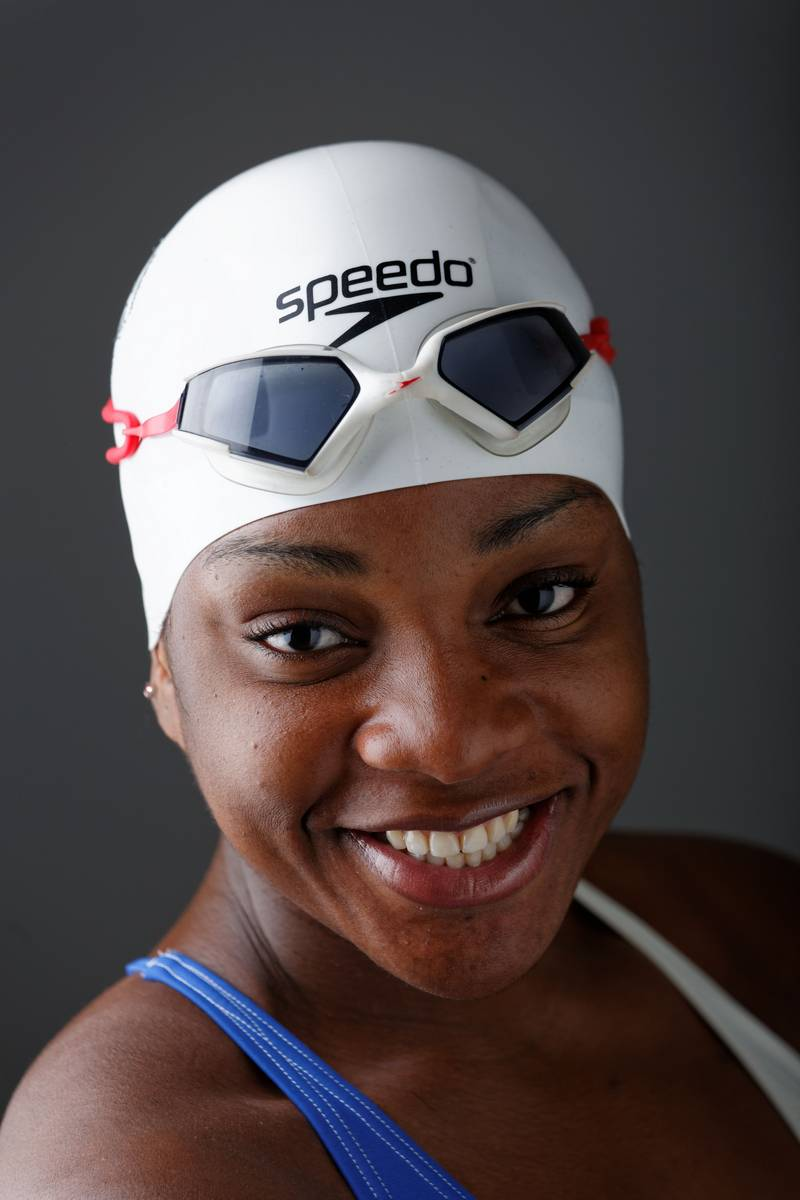

Personal information
- Born: Éliane Dohi Droubry; 24 November 1987 (age 38) Doubé, Ivory Coast

Sport
- Sport: Swimming

Éliane Dohi Droubry (born 24 November 1987) is an Ivorian international competition swimmer.

She used to live in South Africa, and was studying at the University of Pretoria. Through the National Olympic Committee, she was operating at the Attacks NTS (National Swimming Team) club of the University of Pretoria. She is one of the Ivory Coast's greatest hopes in the sport of swimming. She specialises in four particular strokes (butterfly, breaststroke, backstroke, and front crawl) and especially in distances of 50, 100, and 200 meters. She currently lives in Belgium.

== Awards ==
- Participated in the team of Ivory Coast at the 2004 Summer Olympics in Athens.
- Fourth place in the 2003 African games
- Set a world record in 800m freestyle
- Participated in orange bowl in the Olympic pool of Treichville.
- Participated in the 2003 Afro-Asiatic games
- Participated in the 2007 All-Africa Games
