= Kolbrún Ýr Kristjánsdóttir =

Icelandic swimmer

Personal information
- Full name: Kolbrún Ýr Kristjánsdóttir
- National team: Iceland
- Born: 11 November 1982 (age 43) Akranes, Iceland
- Height: 1.74 m (5 ft 9 in)
- Weight: 64 kg (141 lb)

Sport
- Sport: Swimming
- Strokes: Butterfly, backstroke
- Club: Sundfélag Akranes

Kolbrún Ýr Kristjánsdóttir (born November 11, 1982, in Akranes) is a retired Icelandic swimmer, who specialized in backstroke and butterfly events. She is a two-time Olympian (2000 and 2004), and former Icelandic record holder in the same strokes (both 100 and 200 m).

Kolbrún made her first Icelandic team, as a 17-year-old teen, at the 2000 Summer Olympics in Sydney. There, she failed to reach the semifinals in any of her individual events, finishing forty-third in the 100 m backstroke (1:07.28), and thirty-second in the 200 m backstroke (2:24.33).

At the 2004 Summer Olympics in Athens, Kolbrún shortened her program on her second Olympic appearance, swimming only in the 100 m butterfly. She posted a FINA B-standard entry time of 1:02.07 from the Games of the Small States of Europe in Valletta, Malta. She challenged seven other swimmers in heat two, including five-time Olympian Mette Jacobsen of Denmark. She edged out Hong Kong's Sze Hang Yu to pick up a sixth seed by 0.09 of a second in 1:02.33. Kolbrún failed to advance into the semifinals, as she placed thirty-first overall on the first day of preliminaries.
