= Inge de Bruijn =

Dutch former competitive swimmer

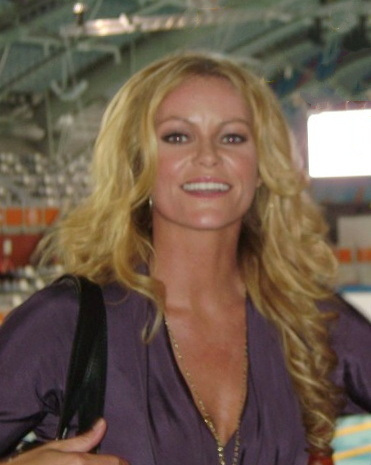
- De Bruijn in 2008

Personal information
- Full name: Inge de Bruijn
- National team: Netherlands
- Born: 24 August 1973 (age 52) Barendrecht, Netherlands
- Height: 1.82 m (6 ft 0 in)
- Weight: 61 kg (134 lb; 9 st 8 lb)

Sport
- Sport: Swimming
- Strokes: Freestyle, butterfly
Medal record
Women's swimming
Representing the Netherlands
| Event | 1st | 2nd | 3rd |
|---|---|---|---|
| Olympic Games | 4 | 2 | 2 |
| World Championships (LC) | 5 | 0 | 1 |
| World Championships (SC) | 1 | 1 | 1 |
| European Championships (LC) | 3 | 2 | 3 |
| European Championships (SC) | 5 | 3 | 3 |
| Total | 18 | 8 | 10 |
Olympic Games
| Gold medal – first place | 2000 Sydney | 50 m freestyle |
| Gold medal – first place | 2000 Sydney | 100 m freestyle |
| Gold medal – first place | 2000 Sydney | 100 m butterfly |
| Gold medal – first place | 2004 Athens | 50 m freestyle |
| Silver medal – second place | 2000 Sydney | 4×100 m freestyle |
| Silver medal – second place | 2004 Athens | 100 m freestyle |
| Bronze medal – third place | 2004 Athens | 100 m butterfly |
| Bronze medal – third place | 2004 Athens | 4×100 m freestyle |
World Championships (LC)
| Gold medal – first place | 2001 Fukuoka | 50 m freestyle |
| Gold medal – first place | 2001 Fukuoka | 100 m freestyle |
| Gold medal – first place | 2001 Fukuoka | 50 m butterfly |
| Gold medal – first place | 2003 Barcelona | 50 m freestyle |
| Gold medal – first place | 2003 Barcelona | 50 m butterfly |
| Bronze medal – third place | 1991 Perth | 4×100 m freestyle |
World Championships (SC)
| Gold medal – first place | 1999 Hong Kong | 50 m freestyle |
| Silver medal – second place | 1999 Hong Kong | 4×100 m freestyle |
| Bronze medal – third place | 1999 Hong Kong | 50 m butterfly |
European Championships (LC)
| Gold medal – first place | 1991 Athens | 4×100 m freestyle |
| Gold medal – first place | 1999 Istanbul | 50 m freestyle |
| Gold medal – first place | 1999 Istanbul | 100 m butterfly |
| Silver medal – second place | 1991 Athens | 100 m butterfly |
| Silver medal – second place | 1999 Istanbul | 100 m freestyle |
| Bronze medal – third place | 1991 Athens | 50 m freestyle |
| Bronze medal – third place | 1991 Athens | 4×100 m medley |
| Bronze medal – third place | 1993 Sheffield | 50 m freestyle |
European Championships (SC)
| Gold medal – first place | 1991 Gelsenkirchen | 50 m butterfly |
| Gold medal – first place | 1998 Sheffield | 50 m freestyle |
| Gold medal – first place | 1998 Sheffield | 50 m butterfly |
| Gold medal – first place | 2001 Antwerp | 50 m freestyle |
| Gold medal – first place | 2001 Antwerp | 100 m freestyle |
| Silver medal – second place | 1992 Espoo | 50 m butterfly |
| Silver medal – second place | 1998 Sheffield | 4×50 m freestyle |
| Silver medal – second place | 2001 Antwerp | 4×50 m freestyle |
| Bronze medal – third place | 1998 Sheffield | 100 m butterfly |
| Bronze medal – third place | 1998 Sheffield | 4×50 m medley |
| Bronze medal – third place | 2001 Antwerp | 4×50 m medley |

Inge de Bruijn (Dutch: [ˈɪŋə də ˈbrœyn]; born 24 August 1973) is a Dutch former competitive swimmer. She is a four-time Olympic champion and a former world record-holder in multiple swimming events.

== Personal ==
De Bruijn was born in Barendrecht, Netherlands. Inge is the sister of Olympic water polo player Matthijs de Bruijn.

== Swimming career ==
De Bruijn tried several sports before eventually specialising in swimming. De Bruijn debuted at the World Aquatics Championships in January 1991, winning a bronze medal with the 4×100 m relay team, with which she won the gold medal at the European LC Championships in August of that year.

The following year, de Bruijn made her Olympic debut at the 1992 Summer Olympics, and finished 8th in the 100 m and 4×100 m freestyle events. She did not compete at the 1996 Summer Olympics. In 1999, she won the 50 m freestyle at the European Championships. The following year, after having swum several 50 m freestyle world records, she competed in the 2000 Summer Olympics in Sydney, Australia. She won the 50 and 100 m freestyle, and the 100 m butterfly, setting world records in all three events. She also won a silver medal with the 4×100 m freestyle relay team. Her nickname became "Invincible Inky".

She was named by Swimming World as the "Female World Swimmer of the Year" in both 2000 and 2001. She won titles in three events at the 2001 World Championships. At the 2003 World Championships, de Bruijn successfully defended her 50 m freestyle and butterfly titles. At the 2004 Summer Olympics in Athens she defended her gold medal in the 50 m free, and took silver in the 100 m free, and two bronze: one in the 100 m butterfly and another in the 4×100 m relay. This made her the oldest individual champion in Olympic swimming history. This record was only surpassed by Anthony Ervin at the age of 36, he won the gold medal for the men's 50m freestyle at the Rio 2016 Olympics. De Bruijn's 2004 title retains its place as the oldest female Olympic champion in swimming history.

With an Olympic medal total of four gold, two silver and two bronze, she is the fourth most successful Dutch Olympian of all time. Moreover, her combined nine individual titles won at the Olympics (four) and World Aquatics Championships (five) were a record for female swimmers until Katie Ledecky won her 10th at the 2016 Summer Olympics.

In March 2007, de Bruijn announced her retirement from competitive swimming.

== International championships (50 m) ==
| Meet | 50 free | 100 free | 50 fly | 100 fly | 4×100 free | 4×100 medley |
|---|---|---|---|---|---|---|
| EC 1991 | 3rd place, bronze medalist(s) | | | 2nd place, silver medalist(s) | 1st place, gold medalist(s) | 3rd place, bronze medalist(s) |
| WC 1991 | | 10th | | 8th | 3rd place, bronze medalist(s) | 4th |
| OG 1992 | 8th | | | 9th | 5th^{[a]} | 8th |
| EC 1993 | 3rd place, bronze medalist(s) | 12th | | 4th | 7th | |
| WC 1994 | | | | 7th | | 6th |
| EC 1995 | 4th | | | 4th | 6th | |
| OG 1996 | | | | | | |
| EC 1997 | | | | | | |
| WC 1998 | | 8th | | 7th | 5th | 6th |
| EC 1999 | 1st place, gold medalist(s) | 2nd place, silver medalist(s) | | 1st place, gold medalist(s) | 4th | 4th |
| EC 2000 | | | | | | |
| OG 2000 | 1st place, gold medalist(s) | 1st place, gold medalist(s) | | 1st place, gold medalist(s) | 2nd place, silver medalist(s) | |
| WC 2001 | 1st place, gold medalist(s) | 1st place, gold medalist(s) | 1st place, gold medalist(s) | | | |
| EC 2002 | | | | | | |
| WC 2003 | 1st place, gold medalist(s) | | 1st place, gold medalist(s) | | | |
| EC 2004 | | 6th | | | | |
| OG 2004 | 1st place, gold medalist(s) | 2nd place, silver medalist(s) | | 3rd place, bronze medalist(s) | 3rd place, bronze medalist(s) | 6th |

^{a} de Bruijn swam only in the heats

== Post-swimming career ==
De Bruijn resides in Eindhoven, Netherlands, and previously trained in Portland, Oregon.

She was the face for Dutch lingerie brand Sapph, along with kickboxer Remy Bonjasky, the face for the men's line of the brand.

She appeared in a special episode of the Dutch naked dating reality television programme Adam Zkt. Eva VIP.

== See also ==
- List of members of the International Swimming Hall of Fame
- List of Dutch records in swimming
- List of multiple Olympic gold medalists at a single Games
- List of multiple Olympic gold medalists
- List of multiple Summer Olympic medalists
- List of top Olympic gold medalists in swimming
- List of individual gold medalists in swimming at the Olympics and World Aquatics Championships (women)
- World record progression 50 metres freestyle
- World record progression 100 metres freestyle

Records
| Preceded by Le Jingyi | Women's 50 metre freestyle world record holder (long course); 4 June 2000 – 24 March 2008 | Succeeded by Marleen Veldhuis |
| Preceded by Le Jingyi | Women's 100 metre freestyle world record holder (long course); 28 May 2000 – 31 March 2004 | Succeeded by Libby Trickett |
| Preceded by Record installed | Women's 50 metre butterfly world record holder (long course); 18 June 1999 – 1 July 1999 | Succeeded by Anna-Karin Kammerling |
| Preceded by Anna-Karin Kammerling | Women's 50 metre butterfly world record holder (long course); 20 May 2000 – 30 July 2002 | Succeeded by Anna-Karin Kammerling |
| Preceded by Jenny Thompson | Women's 100 metre butterfly world record holder (long course); 27 May 2000 – 26 July 2009 | Succeeded by Sarah Sjöström |
Awards and achievements
| Preceded by Leontien van Moorsel | Dutch Sportswoman of the Year; 2001 | Succeeded by Verona van de Leur |
| Preceded by Penny Heyns | World Swimmer of the Year; 2000–2001 | Succeeded by Natalie Coughlin |
| Preceded by Ágnes Kovács | European Swimmer of the Year; 1999–2001 | Succeeded by Franziska van Almsick |
