= Carolina Cerqueda =

Andorran swimmer (born 1985)

Personal information
- Full name: Carolina Cerqueda Santacreu
- National team: Andorra
- Born: 7 November 1985 (age 40) Andorra la Vella, Andorra
- Height: 1.60 m (5 ft 3 in)
- Weight: 53 kg (117 lb)

Sport
- Sport: Swimming
- Strokes: Freestyle
- Club: CN Sabadell (ESP)

Carolina Cerqueda Santacreu (born November 7, 1985) is an Andorran former swimmer, who specialized in sprint freestyle events. She is a 2004 Olympian and currently holds three Andorran records each in the 50, 100, and 200 m freestyle. She is a former member of Club Natació Sabadell in Spain.

Cerqueda qualified for the women's 100 m freestyle at the 2004 Summer Olympics in Athens, by receiving a Universality place from FINA. Four months before the Games, she posted an invitation time of 1:00.62 at the European Championships in Madrid, Spain. She topped the first heat against Burundi's Larissa Inangorore and Benin's Gloria Koussihouede by a wide margin of 23 seconds, in her lifetime best of 1:00.38. Cerqueda failed to advance into the semifinals, as she placed forty-eighth overall in the preliminaries.
