= Ghazal El Jobeili =

Lebanese swimmer (born 1986)

Personal information
- Full name: Ghazal El Jobeili
- National team: Lebanon
- Born: 8 April 1986 (age 40) Beirut, Lebanon
- Height: 1.66 m (5 ft 5 in)
- Weight: 52 kg (115 lb)

Sport
- Sport: Swimming
- Strokes: Freestyle

Ghazal El Jobeili (Arabic: غزل الجبيلي; born April 8, 1986) is a Lebanese former swimmer, who specialized in sprint freestyle events. El Jobeili qualified for the women's 50 m freestyle at the 2004 Summer Olympics in Athens, by receiving a Universality place from FINA, in an entry time of 31.42. She challenged six other swimmers in heat two, including 14-year-olds Sameera Al-Bitar of Bahrain and Christal Clashing of Antigua and Barbuda. She tied for first place with Al-Bitar in their personal bests of exactly 30 seconds. El Jobeili failed to advance into the semifinals, as she placed sixty-third overall out of 75 swimmers on the last day of preliminaries.
