= Jakie Wellman =

Zambian swimmer

Personal information
- Full name: Jakie Kim Wellman
- Nickname: Matana
- National team: Zambia
- Born: 22 July 1988 (age 37) Lusaka, Zambia
- Height: 1.70 m (5 ft 7 in)
- Weight: 65 kg (143 lb)

Sport
- Sport: Swimming
- Strokes: Freestyle
- Club: Kelly College (GBR)
- College team: Missouri State University (U.S.)

Jakie Kim Wellman (also Matana Wellman, born July 22, 1988) is a Zambian swimmer, who specialized in sprint freestyle events. She is a high school graduate of Kelly College in Devon, England, and a member of the swimming team for the Missouri State Bears, while attending the Missouri State University in Springfield, Missouri, United States.

Wellman qualified for the women's 50 m freestyle, as a 16-year-old, at the 2004 Summer Olympics in Athens, by receiving a Universality place from FINA, in an entry time of 28.39. Swimming in heat four, she raced to fourth place by 0.13 of a second behind Aruba's Roshendra Vrolijk in 28.56. Wellman failed to advance into the semifinals, as she placed fiftieth overall out of 75 swimmers on the last day of preliminaries.
