= Binta Zahra Diop =

Senegalese swimmer (born 1990)

Personal information
- Nationality: Senegal
- Born: 30 June 1990 (age 36) Dakar, Senegal
- Height: 1.69 m (5 ft 6 1/2 in)
- Weight: 58 kg (128 lb)

Sport
- Sport: Swimming
- Event: Butterfly
- Club: Club des Vikings de Rouen (FRA)
Medal record
Women's swimming
Representing Senegal
All-Africa Games
Bronze medal – third place	2007 Algiers	50 m butterfly
Bronze medal – third place	2011 Maputo	50 m butterfly

Binta Zahra Diop (born 30 June 1990) is a Senegalese swimmer, who specialized in butterfly events. She is also a two-time bronze medalist for the 50 m butterfly event at the All-Africa Games.

Diop represented Senegal at the 2008 Summer Olympics in Beijing, and competed for the women's 100 m butterfly event. She won the first heat, with a time of 1:04.26. Diop, however, failed to advance into the semi-final rounds, as she placed forty-seventh in the overall rankings.
