= Florencia Szigeti =

Argentine swimmer

Personal information
- Full name: Florencia Szigeti
- National team: Argentina
- Born: July 8, 1981 (age 45) Buenos Aires, Argentina
- Height: 1.70 m (5 ft 7 in)
- Weight: 56 kg (123 lb)

Sport
- Sport: Swimming
- Strokes: Freestyle
- Club: CMR
- College team: Arizona State University
Medal record
Women's swimming
Representing Argentina
Pan American Games
Silver medal – second place	2003 Santo Domingo	100 m freestyle

Florencia Szigeti (born July 8, 1981) is a female freestyle swimmer from Argentina. She twice competed for her native country at the Summer Olympics (2000 and 2004), and won a silver medal in the women's 100 m freestyle event at the 2003 Pan American Games.

== See also ==
- List of Argentine records in swimming
