= Aminath Rouya Hussain =

Maldivian swimmer

Rouya Hussain
Personal information
- Full name: Aminath Rouya Hussain
- Born: 1 September 1990 (age 35) India
- Height: 167 cm (5 ft 6 in)
- Weight: 53 kg (117 lb)

Sport
- Sport: Swimming

Aminath Rouya Hussain (born 1 September 1990) is a competitive swimmer from the Maldives. She competed in the 2008 Summer Olympics in Beijing, China, and was the flag-bearer for her nation during the opening ceremonies of those games.
