= Tojohanitra Andriamanjatoarimanana =

Malagasy swimmer

Personal information
- Full name: Tojohanitra Tokin'aina Andriamanjatoarimanana
- Nickname: Aina
- Nationality: Malagasy
- Born: 30 October 1990 (age 35) Madagascar
- Height: 1.67 m (5 ft 5 1/2 in)

Sport
- Sport: Swimming

Tojohanitra Tokin'aina Andriamanjatoarimanana (born 30 October 1990 in Madagascar) is an Olympic swimmer from Madagascar. She swam for Madagascar at the 2004 and the 2008 Olympics.

Due to the length of her name, it has been truncated or spelled differently at various events. For example:

- at the 2007 World Championships, her name appeared as "T. Andriamanjatoprimamama" in the heat sheets (her full first name appeared in the athlete roster for the event). Note the spelling differences in the last name ("m" for "n"s at the end; "p" for "a" after the "jato").
- sportsreference.com has her listed under both "Tojohanitra Andriamanja" and "Aina Andriamanjatoarimanana"; the former matching her entry in the 2008 Olympics, the latter the 2004 Olympics.

She also swam for Madagascar at the 2003 World Championships and the 2007 Indian Ocean Games.
