= Olga Mukomol =

Ukrainian swimmer (born 1979)

Personal information
- Native name: Ольга Мукомол
- Born: 13 March 1979 (age 47) Bila Tserkva, Ukrainian SSR, Soviet Union
- Height: 1.80 m (5 ft 11 in)
- Weight: 66 kg (146 lb)

Sport
- Club: Spartak Zaporizhia
Medal record
Women's swimming
Representing Ukraine
European Championships
Silver medal – second place	2004 Madrid	4×100 m medley
Bronze medal – third place	2000 Helsinki	50 m freestyle
Bronze medal – third place	2002 Berlin	4×100 m medley
Summer Universiade
Gold medal – first place	2003 Daegu	50 m freestyle
Silver medal – second place	2001 Beijing	50 m freestyle

Olga Mukomol (also Olha, Ukrainian: Ольга Мукомол, born 13 March 1979) is a retired Ukrainian swimmer who won three medals at the LEN European Aquatics Championships of 2000–2004. She also competed at the 2000 and 2004 Summer Olympics in three events each, but was eliminated in the preliminaries.

In 2004, she set a national record in the 50 m freestyle that stood for five years.
