= Monika Bakale =

Congolese swimmer

Personal information
- Full name: Clara Monika Bakale
- Born: May 15, 1979 (age 47)

Sport
- Sport: Swimming

Clara Monika Bakale (born 15 May 1979) is a 3-time Olympic swimmer from the Republic of the Congo. Bakale represented the Congo at the 1996, 2000 and 2004 Olympics.

She is the sister of fellow swimmer Rony Bakale.

She is a welding engineer working for TOTAL E& P
