= Judith Draxler =

Austrian swimmer

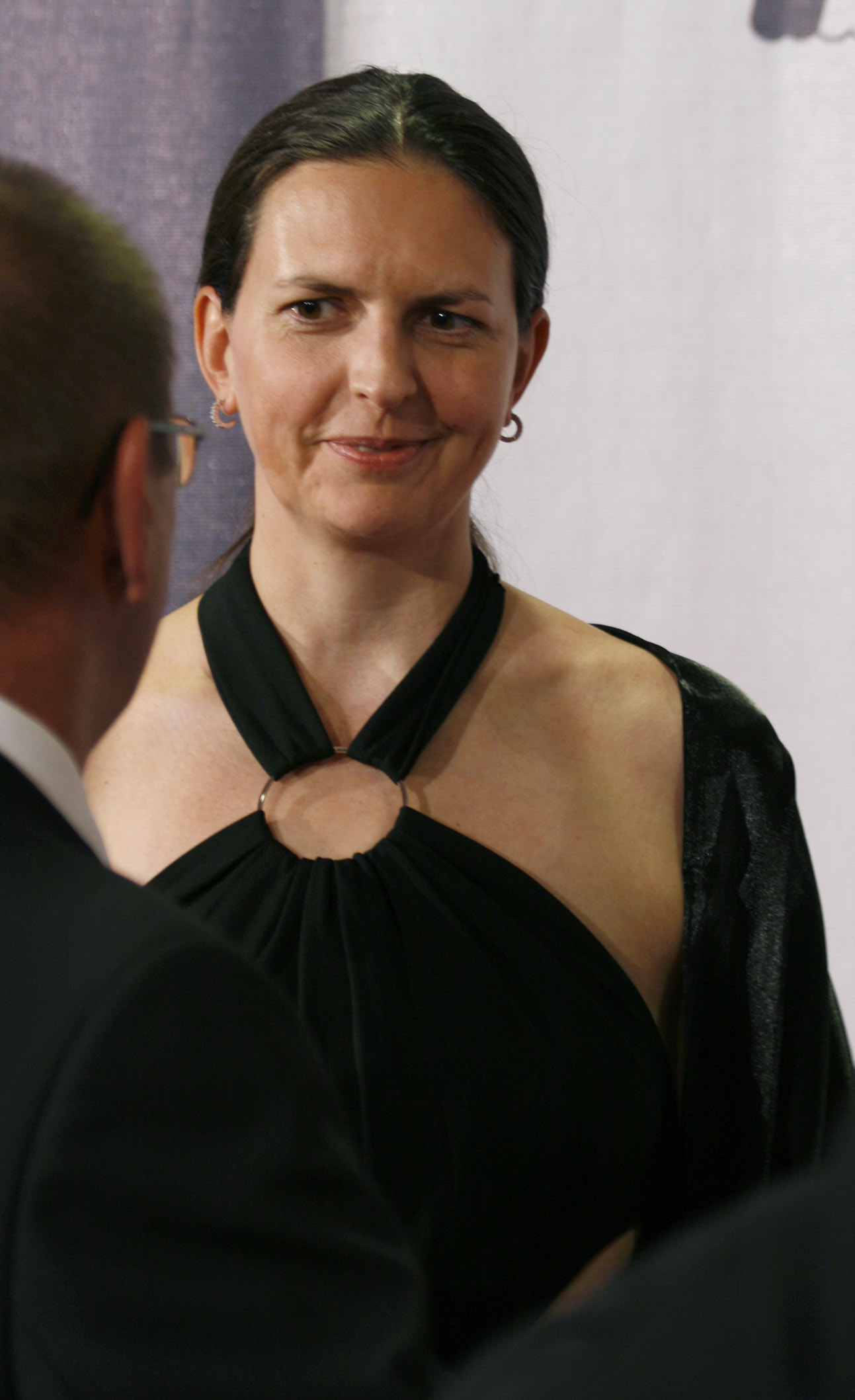
- Draxler in 2008

Personal information
- Born: 24 March 1970 (age 56) Feldbach, Austria

Sport
- Sport: Swimming

Judith Draxler (born 24 March 1970 in Feldbach, Steiermark) is a retired freestyle swimmer from Austria, who competed in three consecutive Summer Olympics for her native country, starting in 1996.
