= Sameera Al-Bitar =

Bahraini swimmer (born 1990)

Sameera Al Bitar
Personal information
- Born: February 21, 1990 (age 36) Amman, Jordan
- Height: 1.76 m (5 ft 9 in)
- Weight: 60 kg (132 lb)

Sport
- Sport: Swimming
- Strokes: Freestyle
- College team: George Washington University (2009)

Sameera Al Bitar, sometimes listed as "Samira" or "Al-Bitar", (born February 21, 1990, in Jordan), is a 2-time Olympic swimmer from Bahrain.

She was one of the first Muslim women representing an Arabian Peninsula country to swim in the Olympic Games, when she swam for Bahrain in the 50 metre freestyle at the 2004 Summer Olympics. The New York Times reported incorrectly that Bitar was "Bahrain's first female Olympic swimmer"; in fact, Fatema Gerashi had represented Bahrain in swimming at the Sydney Olympics four years earlier.

Bitar completed the 50m race with a personal best of 31.00 seconds, enough to win her heat but not enough to advance to the next round.

She again represented Bahrain at the 2008 Summer Olympics in Beijing and won her heat in the 50m freestyle. Her time of 30.32 was well ahead of second-place finisher in her heat, Benin's Gloria Koussihouede (at 37.09), but nonetheless insufficient to advance to the next round.

She graduated from The George Washington University School of Business, where she majored in Finance and Sports Management.

== Career ==
Represented Bahrain in two Olympics (Athens, 2004; Beijing, 2008), five World Championships (Barcelona, 2003; Montreal, 2005; Melbourne, 2007; Rome, 2009; Barcelona, 2013), and the 2006 Asian Games in Doha, Qatar.
