= Swimming at the 2007 World Aquatics Championships – Women's 4 × 200 metre freestyle relay =

The Women's 4 × 200 m Freestyle Relay at the 2007 World Aquatics Championships took place on 29 March 2007 at the Rod Laver Arena in Melbourne, Australia. The top-12 finishers from this race qualified for the event at the 2008 Olympics. 25 teams were entered in the event; all swam.

The existing records when the event started were:

- World Record (WR): 7:50.82, Germany (Dallmann, Samulski, Steffen, Liebs), 3 August 2006 in Budapest, Hungary.
- Championship Record (CR): 7:53.70, USA (Coughlin, Hoff, Myers, Sandeno), Montreal 2005 (Jul.28.2005)

== Results ==
=== Finals ===
| Place | Nation | Swimmers | Time | Note |
|---|---|---|---|---|
| 1st | (United States) USA | Natalie Coughlin (1:56.43) AM; Dana Vollmer (1:57.49); Lacey Nymeyer (1:59.19); Katie Hoff (1:56.98) | 7:50.09 | WR |
| 2nd | Germany | Meike Freitag (1:59.56); Britta Steffen (1:57.58); Petra Dallmann (2:00.40); Annika Lurz (1:56.28) | 7:53.82 | |
| 3rd | France | Alena Popchanka (1:57.86); Sophie Huber (1:58.80); Aurore Mongel (2:01.04); Laure Manaudou (1:58.26) | 7:55.96 | |
| 4th | Australia | Lisbeth Lenton (1:59.01); Jodie Henry (1:59.29); Lara Davenport (1:59.28); Stephanie Rice (1:58.84) | 7:56.42 | |
| 5th | (United Kingdom) Great Britain | Caitlin McClatchey (1:59.12); Melanie Marshall (1:59.54); Francesca Halsall (1:59.92); Joanne Jackson (1:58.44) | 7:57.02 | |
| 6th | Japan | Maki Mita (1:59.25); Norie Urabe (2:00.78); Ai Shibata (1:57.85); Haruka Ueda (2:00.16) | 7:58.04 | |
| 7th | Sweden | Ida Marko-Varga (1:59.62); Josefin Lillhage (1:58.74); Gabriella Fagundez (2:01.61); Petra Granlund (2:02.37) | 8:02.34 | |
| 8th | Netherlands | Inge Dekker (1:58.88); Manon van Rooijen (2:02.63); Femke Heemskerk (2:01.40); Linda Bank (2:01.90) | 8:04.81 | |

=== Preliminaries ===
| Rank | Nation | Swimmers | Time | Note |
|---|---|---|---|---|
| 1 | Australia | Linda Mackenzie (2:00.35); Stephanie Rice (1:59.40); Lara Davenport (1:58.51); Bronte Barratt (1:59.24) | 7:57.50 | Q Olympic |
| 2 | Germany | Petra Dallmann (2:00.54); Daniela Samulski (2:01.09); Meike Freitag (1:58.58); Annika Lurz (1:58.55) | 7:58.76 | Q Olympic |
| 3 | France | Alena Popchanka (1:59.00); Sophie Huber (1:59.08); Céline Couderc (2:00.92); Aurore Mongel (2:00.48) | 7:59.48 | Q Olympic |
| 4 | Japan | Maki Mita (1:59.88); Norie Urabe (2:00.78); Ai Shibata (1:58.38); Haruka Ueda (2:00.54) | 7:59.58 | Q Olympic |
| 5 | (United Kingdom) Great Britain | Joanne Jackson (2:00.14); Melanie Marshall (1:59.29); Julia Beckett (2:01.06); Caitlin McClatchey (1:59.85) | 8:00.34 | Q Olympic |
| 6 | Netherlands | Manon van Rooijen (2:02.17); Inge Dekker (1:58.55); Linda Bank (2:01.43); Femke Heemskerk (2:00.25) | 8:02.40 | Q Olympic |
| 7 | Sweden | Gabriella Fagundez (2:01.02); Ida Marko-Varga (1:58.95); Malin Svahnström (2:03.52); Josefin Lillhage (1:59.14) | 8:02.63 | Q Olympic |
| 8 | (United States) USA | Amanda Weir (2:03.61); Margaret Hoelzer (1:59.90); Kara Lynn Joyce (1:59.00); Lacey Nymeyer (2:00.36) | 8:02.87 | Q Olympic |
| 9 | China | Yang Yu (1:59.86); Tang Yi (2:00.30); Tang Jingzhi (2:01.83); Pang Jiaying (2:00.99) | 8:02.98 | Olympic |
| 10 | New Zealand | Helen Norfolk (2:00.57); Lauren Boyle (2:00.37); Alison Fitch (2:01.62); Melissa Ingram (2:01.78) | 8:04.34 | Olympic |
| 11 | Canada | Brittany Reimer (2:00.15); Julia Wilkinson (2:00.45); Erica Morningstar (2:01.92); Geneviève Saumur (2:02.30) | 8:04.82 | Olympic |
| 12 | Spain | Arantxa Ramos Plasencia (2:00.56); Maria Fuster Martinez (2:01.55); Melania Felicitas Costa Schmid (2:02.94); Erika Villaécija García (2:01.57) | 8:06.62 | Olympic |
| 13 | Italy | Flavia Zoccari (2:02.88); Francesca Segat (2:03.11); Renata Fabiola Spagnolo (2:01.81); Federica Pellegrini (1:58.84) | 8:06.64 | |
| 14 | Denmark | Julie Hjorth-Hansen (2:00.47); Lotte Friis (2:01.85); Micha Jensen (2:02.56); Louise Mai Jansen (2:01.90) | 8:06.78 | |
| 15 | Poland | Katarzyna Baranowska (2:04.05); Agata Zqiejska (2:01.77); Aleksandra Urbanczyk (2:04.10); Paulina Barzycka (2:03.21) | 8:13.13 | |
| 16 | Romania | Camelia Potec (1:59.22); Valentina Georgiana Brat (2:07.92); Larisa Lăcustă (2:07.87); Ionela Cozma (2:03.34) | 8:18.35 | |
| 17 | Hong Kong | Hang Yu Sze (2:09.58); Hannah Wilson (2:07.67); Carmen Nam (2:08.50); Hiu Wai Sherry Tsai (2:04.80) | 8:30.55 | |
| 18 | Singapore | Quah Ting Wen (2:07.28); Mylene Ong (2:07.96); Lynette Lim (2:07.44); Lynette Ng (2:08.97) | 8:31.65 | |
| 19 | El Salvador | Golda Marcus (2:08.70); Ileana Murillo Argueta (2:12.51); Ana Guadalupe Hernandez Duarte (2:15.70); Alexia Pamela Benitez Quijada (2:11.68) | 8:48.59 | |
| 20 | Peru | Fiorella Gomez-Sanchez (2:12.95); Massie Milagros Carillo (2:12.69); Slavica Pavic (2:19.72); Maria Alejandra Torres (2:13.47) | 8:58.83 | |
| 21 | Thailand | Nimitta Thaveesupsoonthorn (2:07.13); Wenika Kaewchaiwong (2:11.44); Pannika Prachgosin (2:23.38); Jiratida Phinyosophon (2:19.99) | 9:01.94 | |
| 22 | (Macau) Macao | Cheok Mei Ma (2:12.34); Weng I Kuan (2:16.16); Man Wai Fong (2:21.05); Yih Shiuan Chan (2:14.00) | 9:03.55 | |
| 23 | Uzbekistan | Irina Shlemova (2:16.90); Yulduz Kuchkarova (2:20.57); Maftunabonu Tuhtasinova (2:15.62); Ranohon Amanova (2:19.76) | 9:12.85 | |
| 24 | Jordan | Miriam Hatamleh (2:14.86); Layla Alghul (2:18.36); Hiba Bashouti (2:18.94); Razan Taha (2:26.96) | 9:19.12 | |
| 25 | India | Kshipra Mahajan (2:21.17); Madhavi Giri Govind (2:20.47); Parita Parekh (2:21.35); Pooja Raghava Alva (2:19.94) | 9:22.93 | |

== See also ==
- Swimming at the 2005 World Aquatics Championships – Women's 4 × 200 metre freestyle relay
- Swimming at the 2008 Summer Olympics – Women's 4 × 200 metre freestyle relay
- Swimming at the 2009 World Aquatics Championships – Women's 4 × 200 metre freestyle relay
