= Swimming at the 2005 World Aquatics Championships – Women's 4 × 200 metre freestyle relay =

Women's 4×200m Free Relay at the 2005 FINA World Aquatics Championships
- Dates: July 28, 2005
- Competitors: 19
- Winning time: 7 minutes 53.70 seconds

Medalists
gold medal	United States
silver medal	Australia
bronze medal	China

The Women's 4x200 Freestyle Relay event at the 11th FINA World Aquatics Championships swam on 28 July 2005 in Montreal, Canada

At the start of the event, the existing World (WR) and Championships (CR) records were:

- WR: 7:53.42 swum by USA on 18 August 2004 in Athens, Greece
- CR: 7:55.70 swum by USA on 24 July 2003 in Barcelona, Spain

== Results ==
=== Final ===
Place	Nation	Swimmers	Time	Notes
1	USA	Natalie Coughlin (1:58.82), Katie Hoff (1:58.50), Whitney Myers (1:58.81), Kaitlin Sandeno (1:57.57)	7:53.70	CR
2	Australia	Libby Lenton (1:57.06), Shayne Reese (2:00.00), Bronte Barratt (1:58.58), Linda Mackenzie (1:58.42)	7:54.06	
3	China	Yingwen Zhu (1:58.91), Jiaying Pang (1:59.90), Yafei Zhou (1:59.44), Yu Yang (1:59.04)	7:57.29	
4	Great Britain	Melanie Marshall (1:59.47), Caitlin McClatchey (1:58.26), Joanne Jackson (1:59.16), Rebecca Cooke (2:02.15)	7:59.04	
5	France	Laure Manaudou (2:00.47), Céline Couderc (2:00.19), Elsa N'Guessan (2:01.63), Solenne Figuès (1:59.14)	8:01.43	
6	Japan	Ai Shibata (1:59.85), Norie Urabe (2:00.78), Haruka Ueda (2:01.69), Sachiko Yamada (2:01.88)	8:04.20	
7	Canada	Sophie Simard (2:00.18), Brittany Reimer (1:59.43), Tanya Hunks (2:03.37), Kelly Stefanyshyn (2:04.58)	8:07.56	
8	New Zealand	Helen Norfolk (2:00.38), Alison Fitch (2:01.67), Lauren Boyle (2:03.06), Melissa Ingram (2:02.84)	8:07.95	

=== Preliminaries ===
Rank	Heat+Lane	Nation	Swimmers	Time	Notes
1	H3 L4	United States	Mary DeScenza (2:01.17), Caroline Burckle (2:00.09), Rachel Komisarz (1:59.50), Kaitlin Sandeno (1:58.88)	7:59.64	q
2	H3 L5	Australia	Libby Lenton (1:58.72), Millie Mitchell (2:00.67), Lara Davenport (2:01.11), Bronte Barratt (1:59.27)	7:59.77	q
3	H2 L4	China	Yingwen Zhu (1:59.31), Jingzhi Tang (2:01.13), Yafei Zhou (2:01.34), Jiaying Pang (2:00.73)	8:02.51	q
4	H3 L2	Japan	Ai Shibata (1:59.02), Norie Urabe (1:59.97), Haruka Ueda (2:01.51), Yumi Kida (2:04.22)	8:04.72	q
5	H2 L5	Great Britain	Rebecca Cooke (2:01.78), Caitlin McClatchey (1:59.81), Julia Beckett (2:03.48), Joanne Jackson (1:59.94)	8:05.01	q
6	H2 L6	New Zealand	Helen Norfolk (2:01.09), Alison Fitch (2:01.34), Lauren Boyle (2:01.39), Melissa Ingram (2:01.30)	8:05.12	q
7	H2 L3	France	Céline Couderc (2:01.18), Angela Tavernier (2:00.73), Elsa N'Guessan (2:00.71), Sophie Huber (2:03.61)	8:06.23	q
8	H1 L6	Canada	Sophie Simard (1:59.38), Audrey Lacroix (2:05.96), Tanya Hunks (2:03.25), Brittany Reimer (1:59.29)	8:07.88	q
9	H2 L2	Italy	Martina Cuppone (2:02.92), Flavia Zoccari (2:01.84), Simona Ricciardi (2:00.94), Renata Spagnolo (2:03.44)	8:09.14	
10	H2 L1	Poland	Paulina Barzycka (2:01.36), Katarzyna Staszak (2:01.98), Katarzyna Kowalczyk (2:04.46), Katarzyna Baranowska (2:01.98)	8:09.78	
11	H3 L6	Netherlands	Inge Dekker (1:59.95), Femke Heemskerk (2:04.97), Haike Van Stralen (2:02.74), Celina Lemmen (2:03.13)	8:10.79	
12	H1 L5	Spain	Tatiana Rouba (2:02.60), Melissa Caballero (2:05.21), Ilune Gorbea (2:02.45), Erika Villaécija (2:00.98)	8:11.24	
13	H3 L3	Brazil	Mariana Brochado (2:03.90), Joanna Melo (2:03.04), Monique Ferreira (2:03.66), Paula Ribeiro (2:02.23)	8:12.83	
14	H3 L7	Slovenia	Sara Isaković (1:59.89), Anja Klinar (2:03.31), Anja Čarman (2:04.54), Jasna Ovsenik (2:05.90)	8:13.64	
15	H1 L2	Denmark	Lotte Friis (2:03.04), Julie Hjorth-Hansen (2:04.24), Annette Hansen (2:08.03), Louise Jansen (2:04.83)	8:20.14	
16	H1 L7	Chinese Taipei	Chin-Kuei Yang (2:04.82), Pin-Chieh Nieh (2:08.72), Man-Hsu Lin (2:10.26), Wan-Tong Cheng (2:12.94)	8:36.74	
17	H2 L7	Singapore	Mylene Ong (2:10.80), Ting Wen Quah (2:11.61), Shu Yong Ho (2:11.72), Joscelin Yeo (2:07.92)	8:42.05	
18	H3 L1	Macau	Cheok Mei Ma (2:16.65), Weng I Kuan (2:15.38), Sin Ian Lei (2:24.44), Man Wai Fong (2:16.68)	9:13.15	
--	H1 L4	Germany	Meike Freitag (2:01.33), Annika Liebs (DQ), Petra Dallmann, Sophie-Luise Dietrich	DQ	
--	--	Sweden		DNS	
