= Swimming at the 2008 Summer Olympics =

Swimming at the Games of the XXIX Olympiad
- Pictogram for swimming at the 2008 Games
- Venue: Beijing National Aquatics Centre (pool); Shunyi Olympic Rowing-Canoeing Park (open water)
- Dates: 9–17 August 2008 (pool); 20–21 August 2008 (open water)
- Competitors: 1,026 from 162 nations

The swimming competitions at the 2008 Summer Olympics took place from 9 to 17 August 2008 at the Beijing National Aquatics Centre. The newly introduced open water marathon events (10 km) were held on 20 and 21 August 2008 at Shunyi Olympic Rowing-Canoeing Park.

Swimming featured 34 events (17 male, 17 female), including two 10 km open-water marathons. The remaining 32 were contested in a 50 m long course pool within the Olympic Park.

The United States claimed a total of 31 medals (12 golds, 9 silver, and 10 bronze) in the leaderboard to maintain its standings as the most successful nation in swimming. A stellar performance in the pool also made an Olympic history for Michael Phelps, who captured eight gold medals to break Mark Spitz's 1972 record, a total of seven, at a single Games. Despite the male swimmers failing to attain a single gold in swimming, Australia managed to repeat a second-place effort on its third consecutive Olympics with 20 medals (six golds, six silver, and eight bronze). Meanwhile, Great Britain finished third with a total of six medals by the benefit of a sterling long-distance freestyle double from Rebecca Adlington.

A total of 25 world records and 65 Olympic records were set during the competition.

== Venue ==
All the swimming, synchronized swimming, and diving events of the 2008 Olympics were held at the Beijing National Aquatics Center (better known as the "Water Cube"), which was claimed to be built to increase the speed of the swimmers. The main pool is about 10 feet (3.0 m) deep, 3 feet (0.91 m) deeper than any other Olympic pool. The lane lines, nicknamed "wave eaters", buffer the waves produced by swimmers while they stroke. The technological advances of the pool were enhanced by several advantages inherent to an indoor swimming venue, namely: temperature, humidity and lighting control. Even the wide decks were built to help give the swimmers a sense of space.

== Events ==
The swimming program for 2008 was expanded from 2004, with the addition of the 10 km marathon open water swimming events, bringing the total number of events to 34 (17 each for men and women). The following events were contested (all pool events were long course, and distances are in metres unless stated):

- Freestyle: 50, 100, 200, 400, 800 (women), and 1500 (men);
- Backstroke: 100 and 200;
- Breaststroke: 100 and 200;
- Butterfly: 100 and 200;
- Individual medley: 200 and 400;
- Relays: 4 × 100 free, 4 × 200 free; 4 × 100 medley
- Open water: 10 kilometres

=== Schedule ===
Unlike the previous Olympics, swimming program schedule occurred in two segments. For the pool events, prelims were held in the evening, with semifinals and final in the following morning session, spanning a day between semifinals and finals in those events with semifinals. The shift of the normal morning prelims and evening finals (to evening prelims and morning finals) occurred for these Games because of the prior request made by US broadcaster NBC (due to the substantial fees NBC has paid for rights to the Olympics, the IOC has allowed NBC to have influence on event scheduling to maximize U.S. television ratings when possible; NBC agreed to a $7.75 billion contract extension on May 7, 2014, to air the Olympics through the 2032 games and is also one of the major sources of revenue for the IOC), so that the finals from the event could be shown live in the United States.

Legend
H	Heats	½	Semi-finals	F	Final

Men
Date →	Aug 9		Aug 10		Aug 11		Aug 12		Aug 13		Aug 14		Aug 15		Aug 16		Aug 17		Aug 21	
Event ↓	M	E	M	E	M	E	M	E	M	E	M	E	M	E	M	E	M	E	M	E
50 m freestyle												H	½		F					
100 m freestyle								H	½		F									
200 m freestyle				H	½		F													
400 m freestyle		H	F																	
1500 m freestyle														H			F			
100 m backstroke				H	½		F													
200 m backstroke										H	½		F							
100 m breaststroke		H	½		F															
200 m breaststroke								H	½		F									
100 m butterfly												H	½		F					
200 m butterfly						H	½		F											
200 m individual medley										H	½		F							
400 m individual medley		H	F																	
4 × 100 m freestyle relay				H	F															
4 × 200 m freestyle relay								H	F											
4 × 100 m medley relay														H			F			
10 km open water																			F	

Women
Date →	Aug 9		Aug 10		Aug 11		Aug 12		Aug 13		Aug 14		Aug 15		Aug 16		Aug 17		Aug 20	
Event ↓	M	E	M	E	M	E	M	E	M	E	M	E	M	E	M	E	M	E	M	E
50 m freestyle														H	½		F			
100 m freestyle										H	½		F							
200 m freestyle						H	½		F											
400 m freestyle				H	F															
800 m freestyle												H			F					
100 m backstroke				H	½		F													
200 m backstroke												H	½		F					
100 m breaststroke				H	½		F													
200 m breaststroke										H	½		F							
100 m butterfly		H	½		F															
200 m butterfly								H	½		F									
200 m individual medley						H	½		F											
400 m individual medley		H	F																	
4 × 100 m freestyle relay		H	F																	
4 × 200 m freestyle relay										H	F									
4 × 100 m medley relay														H			F			
10 km open water																			F	

== Qualification ==
A National Olympic Committee (NOC) may enter up to 2 qualified athletes in each individual event if both meet the A standard, or 1 athlete per event if they meet the B standard. An NOC may also enter a maximum of 1 qualified relay team per event. NOCs may enter swimmers regardless of time (1 swimmer per sex) if they have no swimmers meeting qualifying B standard.

== Participating nations ==
A total of 1,026 swimmers (571 men and 455 women) from 162 nations would compete in swimming events at these Olympic Games. American Samoa, Botswana, Comoros, Congo Democratic Republic, Cook Islands, Marshall Islands, and Tanzania made their official debut in swimming. Meanwhile, Belgium, Dominican Republic, Kuwait, Netherlands Antilles, and Tajikistan returned to the sport after an eight-year absence. Nations with swimmers at the Games are (team size in parentheses):

- Albania (2)
- Algeria (5)
- American Samoa (2)
- Andorra (1)
- Angola (2)
- Antigua and Barbuda (1)
- Argentina (11)
- Armenia (1)
- Aruba (1)
- Australia (43)
- Austria (12)
- Azerbaijan (2)
- Bahamas (4)
- Bahrain (2)
- Bangladesh (2)
- Barbados (4)
- Belarus (8)
- Belgium (7)
- Benin (2)
- Bermuda (2)
- Bolivia (2)
- Bosnia and Herzegovina (1)
- Botswana (2)
- Brazil (25)
- Bulgaria (4)
- Burkina Faso (2)
- Burundi (1)
- Cambodia (2)
- Cameroon (2)
- Canada (27)
- Cayman Islands (2)
- Chile (2)
- China (42)
- Colombia (5)
- Comoros (1)
- Republic of the Congo (1)
- Cook Islands (1)
- Costa Rica (2)
- Ivory Coast (1)
- Croatia (13)
- Cuba (2)
- Cyprus (2)
- Czech Republic (10)
- Democratic Republic of the Congo (1)
- Denmark (9)
- Dominican Republic (1)
- Ecuador (2)
- Egypt (3)
- El Salvador (1)
- Estonia (9)
- Fiji (1)
- Finland (5)
- France (35)
- Georgia (2)
- Germany (25)
- Great Britain (37)
- Greece (18)
- Guam (1)
- Guatemala (1)
- Guinea (2)
- Guyana (1)
- Honduras (2)
- Hong Kong (4)
- Hungary (28)
- Iceland (8)
- India (4)
- Indonesia (2)
- Iran (1)
- Ireland (3)
- Israel (7)
- Italy (34)
- Jamaica (3)
- Japan (31)
- Jordan (2)
- Kazakhstan (12)
- Kenya (2)
- South Korea (16)
- Kuwait (1)
- Kyrgyzstan (3)
- Laos (2)
- Latvia (2)
- Lebanon (2)
- Libya (2)
- Lithuania (9)
- Luxembourg (4)
- Macedonia (2)
- Madagascar (2)
- Malawi (2)
- Malaysia (5)
- Maldives (2)
- Mali (2)
- Malta (2)
- Marshall Islands (2)
- Mauritius (2)
- Mexico (6)
- Federated States of Micronesia (2)
- Moldova (3)
- Mongolia (2)
- Montenegro (1)
- Morocco (1)
- Mozambique (2)
- Myanmar (1)
- Nepal (2)
- Netherlands (18)
- Netherlands Antilles (1)
- New Zealand (15)
- Nicaragua (2)
- Niger (2)
- Nigeria (2)
- Norway (4)
- Oman (4)
- Pakistan (2)
- Palau (1)
- Palestine (2)
- Panama (2)
- Papua New Guinea (2)
- Paraguay (2)
- Peru (2)
- Philippines (5)
- Poland (15)
- Portugal (10)
- Puerto Rico (4)
- Qatar (1)
- Romania (6)
- Russia (35)
- Rwanda (2)
- Saint Lucia (1)
- San Marino (2)
- Saudi Arabia (1)
- Senegal (2)
- Serbia (9)
- Seychelles (2)
- Singapore (5)
- Slovakia (3)
- Slovenia (10)
- South Africa (24)
- Spain (23)
- Sri Lanka (2)
- Sudan (1)
- Suriname (2)
- Swaziland (1)
- Sweden (18)
- Switzerland (7)
- Syria (3)
- Chinese Taipei (5)
- Tajikistan (2)
- Tanzania (2)
- Thailand (2)
- Trinidad and Tobago (3)
- Tunisia (2)
- Turkey (11)
- Turkmenistan (2)
- Uganda (2)
- Ukraine (23)
- United Arab Emirates (1)
- United States (43)
- Uruguay (3)
- Uzbekistan (7)
- Venezuela (13)
- Vietnam (1)
- Virgin Islands (1)
- Yemen (2)
- Zambia (2)
- Zimbabwe (2)

== Medal summary ==
=== Medal table ===
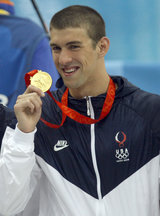
Michael Phelps holding his gold medal from the 4 × 100 relay

Retrieved from 2008 NBC Olympics website.

Rank	Nation	Gold	Silver	Bronze	Total
1	United States	12	9	10	31
2	Australia	6	6	8	20
3	Great Britain	2	2	2	6
4	Japan	2	0	3	5
5	Germany	2	0	1	3
6	Netherlands	2	0	0	2
7	China	1	3	2	6
8	Zimbabwe	1	3	0	4
9	France	1	2	3	6
10	Russia	1	1	2	4
11	Italy	1	1	0	2
11	South Korea	1	1	0	2
13	Brazil	1	0	1	2
14	Tunisia	1	0	0	1
15	Hungary	0	3	0	3
16	Norway	0	1	1	2
17	Serbia	0	1	0	1
17	Slovenia	0	1	0	1
19	Austria	0	0	1	1
19	Canada	0	0	1	1
19	Denmark	0	0	1	1
Totals (21 entries)		34	34	36	104

=== Men's events ===
Games	Gold		Silver		Bronze	
50 m freestyle	César Cielo; Brazil	21.30 OR, AM	Amaury Leveaux; France	21.45	Alain Bernard; France	21.49
100 m freestyle	Alain Bernard; France	47.21	Eamon Sullivan; Australia	47.32	Jason Lezak; United States; César Cielo; Brazil	47.67 47.67 NR
200 m freestyle	Michael Phelps; United States	1:42.96 WR	Park Tae-hwan; South Korea	1:44.85 AS	Peter Vanderkaay; United States	1:45.14
400 m freestyle	Park Tae-hwan; South Korea	3:41.86 AS	Zhang Lin; China	3:42.44 NR	Larsen Jensen; United States	3:42.78 AM
1500 m freestyle	Oussama Mellouli; Tunisia	14:40.84 AF	Grant Hackett; Australia	14:41.53	Ryan Cochrane; Canada	14:42.69
100 m backstroke	Aaron Peirsol; United States	52.54 WR	Matt Grevers; United States	53.11	Arkady Vyatchanin; Russia; Hayden Stoeckel; Australia	53.18
200 m backstroke	Ryan Lochte; United States	1:53.94 WR	Aaron Peirsol; United States	1:54.33	Arkady Vyatchanin; Russia	1:54.93 ER
100 m breaststroke	Kosuke Kitajima; Japan	58.91 WR	Alexander Dale Oen; Norway	59.20	Hugues Duboscq; France	59.37 NR
200 m breaststroke	Kosuke Kitajima; Japan	2:07.64 OR	Brenton Rickard; Australia	2:08.88 OC	Hugues Duboscq; France	2:08.94 NR
100 m butterfly	Michael Phelps; United States	50.58 OR	Milorad Čavić; Serbia	50.59 ER	Andrew Lauterstein; Australia	51.12 OC
200 m butterfly	Michael Phelps; United States	1:52.03 WR	László Cseh; Hungary	1:52.70 ER	Takeshi Matsuda; Japan	1:52.97 AS
200 m individual medley	Michael Phelps; United States	1:54.23 WR	László Cseh; Hungary	1:56.52 ER	Ryan Lochte; United States	1:56.53
400 m individual medley	Michael Phelps; United States	4:03.84 WR	László Cseh; Hungary	4:06.16 ER	Ryan Lochte; United States	4:08.09
4 × 100 m freestyle relay	United States; Michael Phelps (47.51) AM; Garrett Weber-Gale (47.02); Cullen Jones (47.65); Jason Lezak (46.06); Nathan Adrian*; Ben Wildman-Tobriner*; Matt Grevers*	3:08.24 WR	France; Amaury Leveaux (47.91); Fabien Gilot (47.05); Frédérick Bousquet (46.63); Alain Bernard(46.73); Grégory Mallet*; Boris Steimetz*	3:08.32 ER	Australia; Eamon Sullivan (47.24) WR; Andrew Lauterstein (47.87); Ashley Callus (47.55); Matt Targett (47.25); Leith Brodie*; Patrick Murphy*	3:09.91 OC
4 × 200 m freestyle relay	United States; Michael Phelps (1:43.31); Ryan Lochte (1:44.28); Ricky Berens (1:46.29); Peter Vanderkaay (1:44.68); Klete Keller*; Erik Vendt*; David Walters*	6:58.56 WR	Russia; Nikita Lobintsev (1:46.64) NR; Yevgeny Lagunov (1:46.56); Danila Izotov (1:45.85); Alexander Sukhorukov (1:44.65); Mikhail Polishchuk*	7:03.70 ER	Australia; Patrick Murphy (1:45.95); Grant Hackett (1:45.87); Grant Brits (1:47.13); Nic Ffrost (1:46.03); Leith Brodie*; Kirk Palmer*	7:04.98
4 × 100 m medley relay	United States; Aaron Peirsol (53.16); Brendan Hansen (59.27); Michael Phelps (50.15); Jason Lezak (46.76); Matt Grevers*; Mark Gangloff*; Ian Crocker*; Garrett Weber-Gale*	3:29.34 WR	Australia; Hayden Stoeckel (53.80); Brenton Rickard (58.56); Andrew Lauterstein (51.03); Eamon Sullivan (46.65); Ashley Delaney*; Christian Sprenger*; Adam Pine*; Matt Targett*	3:30.04 OC	Japan; Junichi Miyashita (53.87); Kosuke Kitajima (58.07); Takuro Fujii (50.89); Hisayoshi Sato (48.35)	3:31.18 AS
10 km open water	Maarten van der Weijden; Netherlands	1:51:51.6	David Davies; Great Britain	1:51:53.1	Thomas Lurz; Germany	1:51:53.6

* Swimmers who participated in the heats only and received medals.

=== Women's events ===
Games	Gold		Silver		Bronze	
50 m freestyle	Britta Steffen; Germany	24.06 OR, ER	Dara Torres; United States	24.07 AM	Cate Campbell; Australia	24.17
100 m freestyle	Britta Steffen; Germany	53.12 OR	Lisbeth Trickett; Australia	53.16	Natalie Coughlin; United States	53.39 =AM
200 m freestyle	Federica Pellegrini; Italy	1:54.82 WR	Sara Isaković; Slovenia	1:54.97 NR	Pang Jiaying; China	1:55.05 AS
400 m freestyle	Rebecca Adlington; Great Britain	4:03.22	Katie Hoff; United States	4:03.29	Joanne Jackson; Great Britain	4:03.52
800 m freestyle	Rebecca Adlington; Great Britain	8:14.10 WR	Alessia Filippi; Italy	8:20.23 NR	Lotte Friis; Denmark	8:23.03
100 m backstroke	Natalie Coughlin; United States	58.96 AM	Kirsty Coventry; Zimbabwe	59.19	Margaret Hoelzer; United States	59.34
200 m backstroke	Kirsty Coventry; Zimbabwe	2:05.24 WR	Margaret Hoelzer; United States	2:06.23	Reiko Nakamura; Japan	2:07.13 AS
100 m breaststroke	Leisel Jones; Australia	1:05.17 OR	Rebecca Soni; United States	1:06.73	Mirna Jukić; Austria	1:07.34
200 m breaststroke	Rebecca Soni; United States	2:20.22 WR	Leisel Jones; Australia	2:22.05	Sara Nordenstam; Norway	2:23.02 ER
100 m butterfly	Lisbeth Trickett; Australia	56.73 OC	Christine Magnuson; United States	57.10	Jessicah Schipper; Australia	57.25
200 m butterfly	Liu Zige; China	2:04.18 WR	Jiao Liuyang; China	2:04.72	Jessicah Schipper; Australia	2:06.26
200 m individual medley	Stephanie Rice; Australia	2:08.45 WR	Kirsty Coventry; Zimbabwe	2:08.59 AF	Natalie Coughlin; United States	2:10.34
400 m individual medley	Stephanie Rice; Australia	4:29.45 WR	Kirsty Coventry; Zimbabwe	4:29.89 AF	Katie Hoff; United States	4:31.71
4 × 100 m freestyle relay	Netherlands; Inge Dekker (54.37); Ranomi Kromowidjojo (53.39); Femke Heemskerk (53.42); Marleen Veldhuis (52.58); Hinkelien Schreuder*; Manon van Rooijen*	3:33.76 OR	United States; Natalie Coughlin (54.00); Lacey Nymeyer (53.91); Kara Lynn Joyce (53.98); Dara Torres (52.44); Emily Silver*; Julia Smit*	3:34.33 AM	Australia; Cate Campbell (54.40); Alice Mills (54.43); Melanie Schlanger (53.85); Lisbeth Trickett (52.34); Shayne Reese*	3:35.05 OC
4 × 200 m freestyle relay	Australia; Stephanie Rice (1:56.60) =OC; Bronte Barratt 1:56.58); Kylie Palmer (1:55.22); Linda Mackenzie (1:55.91); Lara Davenport*; Felicity Galvez*; Angie Bainbridge*; Melanie Schlanger*	7:44.31 WR	China; Yang Yu (1:56.79); Zhu Qianwei (1:56.64); Tan Miao (1:58.11); Pang Jiaying (1:54.39); Tang Jingzhi*	7:45.93 AS	United States; Allison Schmitt (1:57.71); Natalie Coughlin (1:57.19); Caroline Burckle (1:56.70); Katie Hoff (1:54.73); Christine Marshall*; Kim Vandenberg*; Julia Smit*	7:46.33 AM
4 × 100 m medley relay	Australia; Emily Seebohm (59.33) OC; Leisel Jones (1:04.58); Jessicah Schipper (56.25); Lisbeth Trickett (52.53); Tarnee White*; Felicity Galvez*; Shayne Reese*	3:52.69 WR	United States; Natalie Coughlin (58.94) AM; Rebecca Soni (1:05.95); Christine Magnuson (56.14); Dara Torres (52.27); Margaret Hoelzer*; Megan Jendrick*; Elaine Breeden*; Kara Lynn Joyce*	3:53.30 AM	China; Zhao Jing (59.56) NR; Sun Ye (1:06.76); Zhou Yafei (57.40); Pang Jiaying (52.40); Xu Tianlongzi*	3:56.11 AS
10 km open water	Larisa Ilchenko; Russia	1:59:27.7	Keri-Anne Payne; Great Britain	1:59:29.2	Cassandra Patten; Great Britain	1:59:31.0

* Swimmers who participated in the heats only and received medals.

== Olympic and world records broken ==
At the 2008 Summer Olympics, new world records were set 25 times (affecting 21 distinct world records) and new Olympic records were set 65 times and one other was equalled (affecting 30 distinct Olympic records). Only Ian Thorpe's 3:40.59 in the 400 metres freestyle and Inge de Bruijn's 56.61 in the 100 metres butterfly, both set in Sydney, remained Olympic records. Michael Phelps of the United States also broke the record for the most gold medals ever won by an Olympian with a total of 14; 8 of which were won during the 2008 Summer Olympics - this was also a world record.

=== Men ===
Event	Date	Round	Name	Nationality	Time	Record	Day
Men's 100 m breaststroke	August 9	Heat 7	Alexander Dale Oen	Norway	59.41	OR	1
Men's 400 m individual medley	August 9	Heat 4	Michael Phelps	United States	4:07.82	OR	1
Men's 100 m backstroke	August 10	Heat 4	Matt Grevers	United States	53.41	OR	2
Men's 100 m breaststroke	August 10	Semifinal 2	Alexander Dale Oen	Norway	59.16	OR	2
Men's 400 m individual medley	August 10	Final	Michael Phelps	United States	4:03.84	WR	2
Men's 4 × 100 m freestyle relay	August 10	Heat 1	Nathan Adrian (48.82); Cullen Jones (47.61); Ben Wildman-Tobriner (48.03); Matt Grevers (47.77)	United States	3:12.23	WR	2
Men's 100 m freestyle	August 10	Heat 1 leadoff*	Amaury Leveaux	France	47.76	OR	2
Men's 100 m backstroke	August 11	Semifinal 1	Arkady Vyatchanin	Russia	53.06	OR	3
Men's 100 m backstroke	August 11	Semifinal 2	Hayden Stoeckel	Australia	52.97	OR	3
Men's 100 m breaststroke	August 11	Final	Kosuke Kitajima	Japan	58.91	WR	3
Men's 200 m butterfly	August 11	Heat 6	Michael Phelps	United States	1:53.70	OR	3
Men's 4 × 100 m freestyle relay	August 11	Final	Michael Phelps (47.51); Garrett Weber-Gale (47.02); Cullen Jones (47.65); Jason Lezak (46.06)	United States	3:08.24	WR	3
Men's 100 m freestyle	August 11	Final leadoff*	Eamon Sullivan	Australia	47.24	WR	3
Men's 200 m freestyle	August 12	Final	Michael Phelps	United States	1:42.96	WR	4
Men's 100 m backstroke	August 12	Final	Aaron Peirsol	United States	52.54	WR	4
Men's 200 m breaststroke	August 12	Heat 5	Paolo Bossini	Italy	2:08.98	OR	4
Men's 200 m breaststroke	August 12	Heat 7	Dániel Gyurta	Hungary	2:08.68	OR	4
Men's 200 m butterfly	August 12	Semifinal 2	Michael Phelps	United States	1:53.70	OR	4
Men's 4 × 200 m freestyle relay	August 12	Heat 2	David Walters (1:46.57); Ricky Berens (1:45.47); Erik Vendt (1:47.11); Klete Keller (1:45.51)	United States	7:04.66	OR	4
Men's 100 m freestyle	August 13	Semifinal 1	Alain Bernard	France	47.20	WR	5
Men's 100 m freestyle	August 13	Semifinal 2	Eamon Sullivan	Australia	47.05	WR	5
Men's 200 m breaststroke	August 13	Semifinal 1	Kosuke Kitajima	Japan	2:08.61	OR	5
Men's 200 m butterfly	August 13	Final	Michael Phelps	United States	1:52.03	WR	5
Men's 4 × 200 m freestyle relay	August 13	Final	Michael Phelps (1:43.31); Ryan Lochte (1:44.28); Ricky Berens (1:46.29); Peter Vanderkaay (1:44.68)	United States	6:58.56	WR	5
Men's 50 m freestyle	August 14	Heat 11	César Cielo	Brazil	21.47	OR	6
Men's 50 m freestyle	August 14	Heat 12	Amaury Leveaux	France	21.46	OR	6
Men's 100 m butterfly	August 14	Heat 7	Jason Dunford	Kenya	51.14	OR	6
Men's 100 m butterfly	August 14	Heat 9	Milorad Čavić	Serbia	50.76	OR	6
Men's 50 m freestyle	August 15	Semifinal 1	César Cielo	Brazil	21.34	OR	7
Men's 1500 m freestyle	August 15	Heat 3	Ryan Cochrane	Canada	14:40.84	OR	7
Men's 1500 m freestyle	August 15	Heat 5	Grant Hackett	Australia	14:38.92	OR	7
Men's 200 m backstroke	August 15	Final	Ryan Lochte	United States	1:53.94	WR	7
Men's 200 m individual medley	August 15	Final	Michael Phelps	United States	1:54.23	WR	7
Men's 50 m freestyle	August 16	Final	César Cielo	Brazil	21.30	OR	8
Men's 100 m butterfly	August 16	Final	Michael Phelps	United States	50.58	OR	8
Men's 4 × 100 m medley relay	August 17	Final	Aaron Peirsol (53.16); Brendan Hansen (59.27); Michael Phelps (50.15); Jason Lezak (46.76)	United States	3:29.34	WR	9

* World record split from the 4 × 100 m freestyle relay

Note: At the 4 × 100 m freestyle relay final, anchor Jason Lezak swam the fastest 100 m split (46.06); however, this is not considered an official FINA record, as he did not swim the first leg.

=== Women ===
Event	Date	Round	Name	Nationality	Time	Record	Day
Women's 400 m freestyle	August 10	Heat 5	Katie Hoff	United States	4:03.71	OR	2
Women's 400 m freestyle	August 10	Heat 6	Federica Pellegrini	Italy	4:02.19	OR	2
Women's 100 m backstroke	August 10	Heat 5	Anastasia Zuyeva	Russia	59.61	OR	2
Women's 100 m backstroke	August 10	Heat 6	Reiko Nakamura	Japan	59.36	OR	2
Women's 100 m backstroke	August 10	Heat 7	Kirsty Coventry	Zimbabwe	59.00	OR	2
Women's 100 m breaststroke	August 10	Heat 7	Leisel Jones	Australia	1:05.64	OR	2
Women's 400 m individual medley	August 10	Final	Stephanie Rice	Australia	4:29.45	WR	2
Women's 4 × 100 m freestyle relay	August 10	Final	Inge Dekker (54.37); Ranomi Kromowidjojo (53.39); Femke Heemskerk (53.42); Marleen Veldhuis (52.58)	Netherlands	3:33.76	OR	2
Women's 100 m freestyle	August 10	Final leadoff*	Britta Steffen	Germany	53.38	OR	2
Women's 200 m freestyle	August 11	Heat 4	Pang Jiaying	China	1:57.37	OR	3
Women's 200 m freestyle	August 11	Heat 5	Sara Isaković	Slovenia	1:55.86	OR	3
Women's 200 m freestyle	August 11	Heat 6	Federica Pellegrini	Italy	1:55.45	WR	3
Women's 100 m backstroke	August 11	Semifinal 2	Kirsty Coventry	Zimbabwe	58.77	WR	3
Women's 100 m breaststroke	August 12	Final	Leisel Jones	Australia	1:05.17	OR	4
Women's 200 m individual medley	August 12	Semifinal 1	Kirsty Coventry	Zimbabwe	2:09.53	OR	4
Women's 200 m freestyle	August 13	Final	Federica Pellegrini	Italy	1:54.82	WR	5
Women's 200 m breaststroke	August 13	Heat 5	Rebecca Soni	United States	2:22.17	OR	5
Women's 200 m individual medley	August 13	Final	Stephanie Rice	Australia	2:08.45	OR	5
Women's 4 × 200 m freestyle relay	August 13	Heat 1	Alena Popchanka (1:58.27); Céline Couderc (1:58.92); Camille Muffat (1:57.32); Coralie Balmy (1:55.86)	France	7:50.37	OR	5
Women's 800 m freestyle	August 14	Heat 4	Rebecca Adlington	Great Britain	8:18.06	OR	6
Women's 200 m backstroke	August 14	Heat 4	Kirsty Coventry	Zimbabwe	2:06.76	OR	6
Women's 200 m butterfly	August 14	Final	Liu Zige	China	2:04.18	WR	6
Women's 4 × 200 m freestyle relay	August 14	Final	Stephanie Rice (1:56.60); Bronte Barratt (1:56.58); Kylie Palmer (1:55.22); Linda Mackenzie (1:55.91)	Australia	7:44.31	WR	6
Women's 100 m freestyle	August 15	Final	Britta Steffen	Germany	53.12	OR	7
Women's 200 m breaststroke	August 15	Final	Rebecca Soni	United States	2:20.22	WR	7
Women's 800 m freestyle	August 16	Final	Rebecca Adlington	Great Britain	8:14.10	WR	8
Women's 200 m backstroke	August 16	Final	Kirsty Coventry	Zimbabwe	2:05.24	WR	8
Women's 50 m freestyle	August 17	Final	Britta Steffen	Germany	24.06	OR	9
Women's 4 × 100 m medley relay	August 17	Final	Emily Seebohm (59.33); Leisel Jones (1:04.58); Jessicah Schipper (56.25); Lisbeth Trickett (52.53)	Australia	3:52.69	WR	9

== LZR Racer suits ==
Another big change to swimming occurred when Speedo launched the LZR Racer swim suits on February 13, 2008. The suits, developed by the Australian Institute of Sport, were designed to repel water, allow oxygen to flow to the muscles, and hold the body in a more hydrodynamic position. The suits had been proven to give the swimmer a lower time by 1.9 to 2.2%. Due to the advantage provided by the suits, some swimmers complained about the fairness in its use, because some people used multiple swimsuits to improve buoyancy and compressing of body; the official blog for the National Collegiate Athletic Association pondered whether they were "technology doping" and what was the difference between gaining advantage from a swimsuit and gaining advantage from performance-enhancing drugs. In response to these complaints, the International Swimming Federation (FINA) scheduled a meeting with Speedo to discuss the suits. After the meeting, FINA dismissed the claims of cheating, and endorsed the suits for future swimming meets. By August 14, 2008, 62 world records had been broken by swimmers wearing the LZR Racer.

== See also ==
- Swimming at the 2008 Summer Paralympics
- 2008 in swimming
