= Swimming at the 2007 World Aquatics Championships – Women's 4 × 100 metre freestyle relay =

The Women's 4 × 100 m Freestyle Relay at the 2007 World Aquatics Championships took place on 25 March 2007 (prelims and final) at the Rod Laver Arena in Melbourne, Australia. The top-12 finishers from this race qualified for the event at the 2008 Olympics.

The existing records when the event started were:

- World Record (WR): 3:35.22, Germany (Dallmann, Goetz, Steffen, Liebs), 31 July 2006 in Budapest, Hungary.
- Championship Record (CR): 3:37.32, Australia (Henry, Mills, Reese, Lenton), Barcelona 2005 (Jul.24.2005)

== Results ==
=== Final ===
| Place | Lane | Country | Athletes (splits: 50m & 100m) | Time | Notes |
|---|---|---|---|---|---|
| | 3 | Australia | Lisbeth Lenton ( 25.58 / 53.42 CR); Melanie Schlanger ( 26.08 / 53.95 ) Shayne Reese ( 26.36 / 54.90 ) Jodie Henry ( 25.47 / 53.21 ) | 3:35.48 | CR |
| | 4 | (United States) USA | Natalie Coughlin ( 25.98 / 54.13 ) Lacey Nymeyer ( 25.70 / 53.50 ) Amanda Weir ( 25.91 / 54.02 ) Kara Lynn Joyce ( 25.58 / 54.03 ) | 3:35.68 | |
| | 5 | Netherlands | Inge Dekker ( 26.27 / 54.57 ) Ranomi Kromowidjojo ( 26.10 / 54.82 ) Femke Heemskerk ( 25.62 / 54.13 ) Marleen Veldhuis ( 25.05 / 53.29 ) | 3:36.81 | |
| 4 | 2 | Germany | Petra Dallmann ( 26.60 / 55.11 ) Annika Lurz ( 26.01 / 54.56 ) Daniela Samulski ( 25.74 / 54.62 ) Britta Steffen ( 25.08 / 52.65 ) | 3:36.94 | |
| 5 | 6 | Sweden | Josefin Lillhage ( 26.74 / 54.62 ) Magdalena Kuras ( 26.48 / 55.38 ) Therese Alshammar ( 25.61 / 54.35 ) Ida Marko-Varga ( 25.86 / 54.88 ) | 3:39.23 | NR & Nordic Record |
| 6 | 1 | France | Alena Popchanka ( 26.74 / 55.42 ) Malia Metella ( 26.24 / 54.73 ) Céline Couderc ( 26.00 / 54.35 ) Aurore Mongel ( 26.79 / 55.59 ) | 3:40.09 | |
| 7 | 7 | China | Tang Yi ( 27.04 / 55.67 ) Yang Yu ( 26.45 / 55.01 ) Xu Yanwei ( 26.55 / 55.12 ) Zhu Yingwen ( 26.28 / 54.68 ) | 3:40.48 | |
| 8 | 8 | (United Kingdom) Great Britain | Francesca Halsall ( 26.27 / 54.80 ) Melanie Marshall ( 25.82 / 54.42 ) Julia Beckett ( 26.87 / 56.06 ) Rosalind Brett ( 26.62 / 55.66 ) | 3:40.94 | |

=== Prelims ===
==== Heat 1 ====
| # | Lane | Country | 50m | 100m | Time | Q | Rank |
| # | Lane | Name | 50m | 100m | Time | Q | Rank |
|---|---|---|---|---|---|---|---|
| 1 | 5 | Malta | | | 4:08.03 | | 19 |
| | | Madeleine Scerri | 28.49 | 58.73 | 58.73 | | |
| | | Davina Mangion | 30.30 | 1:02.31 | 2:01.04 | | |
| | | Talisa Pace | 29.93 | 1:05.73 | 3:03.77 | | |
| | | Angela Galea | 31.35 | 1:04.26 | 4:08.03 | | |
| 2 | 3 | Zambia | | | 4:10.83 | | 21 |
| | | Ellen Hight | 28.75 | 59.79 | 59.79 | | |
| | | Matana Wellman | 28.65 | 1:00.54 | 2:00.33 | | |
| | | Patricia Wellman | 30.68 | 1:05.10 | 3:05.43 | | |
| | | Mercedes Milner | 30.40 | 1:05.40 | 4:10.83 | | |
| 1 | 4 | Nigeria | | | 4:17.46 | | 25 |
| | | Uche Monu | 30.86 | 1:05.38 | 1:05.38 | | |
| | | Blessing Forcados | 30.98 | 1:04.90 | 2:10.28 | | |
| | | Obia Inyegiyikabo | 30.69 | 1:05.17 | 3:15.45 | | |
| | | Ngozi Monu | 28.81 | 1:02.01 | 4:17.46 | | |

==== Heat 2 ====
| # | Lane | Country | 50m | 100m | Time | Q | Rank |
| # | Lane | Name | 50m | 100m | Time | Q | Rank |
|---|---|---|---|---|---|---|---|
| 1 | 4 | Australia | | | 3:40.04 | Q | 3 |
| | | Danni Miatke | 26.69 | 56.02 | 56.02 | Olympic | |
| | | Melanie Schlanger | 26.33 | 54.19 | 1:50.21 | Olympic | |
| | | Sally Foster | 26.08 | 55.29 | 2:45.50 | Olympic | |
| | | Shayne Reese | 25.92 | 54.54 | 3:40.04 | Olympic | |
| 2 | 5 | Sweden | | | 3:40.09 | Q | 4 |
| | | Ida Marko-Varga | 26.41 | 56.02 | 56.02 | Olympic | |
| | | Josefin Lillhage | 25.93 | 54.56 | 1:50.15 | Olympic | |
| | | Therese Alshammar | 25.76 | 54.57 | 2:44.72 | Olympic | |
| | | Magdalena Kuras | 26.03 | 55.37 | 3:40.09 | Olympic | |
| 3 | 3 | China | | | 3:40.73 | Q | 6 |
| | | Pang Jiaying | 26.84 | 55.93 | 55.93 | Olympic | |
| | | Tang Yi | 26.03 | 54.86 | 1:50.79 | Olympic | |
| | | Yang Yu | 26.22 | 54.94 | 2:45.73 | Olympic | |
| | | Zhu Yingwen | 26.30 | 55.00 | 3:40.73 | Olympic | |
| 4 | 2 | Belarus | | | 3:42.92 | | 9 |
| | | Aleksandra Gerasimenya | 26.34 | 54.90 | 54.90 | Olympic | |
| | | Iryna Niafedava | 26.48 | 56.17 | 1:51.07 | Olympic | |
| | | Sviatlana Khakhlova | 26.07 | 55.33 | 2:46.40 | Olympic | |
| | | Maryia Hanchar | 26.59 | 56.52 | 3:42.92 | Olympic | |
| 5 | 6 | Belgium | | | 3:46.55 | | 14 |
| | | Emily Vavourakis | 27.46 | 56.70 | 56.70 | | |
| | | Sascha van den Branden | 27.00 | 56.38 | 1:53.08 | | |
| | | Jorina Aerents | 26.65 | 56.79 | 2:49.87 | | |
| | | Tine Bossuyt | 27.84 | 56.68 | 3:46.55 | | |
| 6 | 7 | Thailand | | | 4:04.55 | | 18 |
| | | Wenika Kaewchaiwong | 29.51 | 1:02.01 | 1:05.01 | | |
| | | Pannika Prachgosin | 29.15 | 1:01.46 | 2:03.47 | | |
| | | Jiratida Phinyosophon | 27.92 | 58.10 | 3:01.57 | | |
| | | Nimitta Thaveesupsoonthorn | 30.14 | 1:02.98 | 4:04.55 | | |
| 7 | 1 | Peru | | | 4:12.37 | | 22 |
| | | Massie Milagros Carrillo | 29.39 | 1:01.63 | 1:01.63 | | |
| | | Fiorella Gomez-Sanchez | 30.60 | 1:03.08 | 2:04.71 | | |
| | | Maria Alejandra Torres | 30.46 | 1:02.53 | 3:07.24 | | |
| | | Slavica Pavic | 31.00 | 1:05.13 | 4:12.37 | | |
| 8 | 8 | India | | | 4:14.11 | | 24 |
| | | Parita Parekh | 29.42 | 1:01.92 | 1:01.92 | | |
| | | Madhavi Giri Govind | 31.76 | 1:06.59 | 2:08.51 | | |
| | | Pooja Raghava Alva | 29.66 | 1:02.80 | 3:11.31 | | |
| | | Kshipra Mahajan | 29.68 | 1:02.80 | 4:14.11 | | |

==== Heat 3 ====
| # | Lane | Country | 50m | 100m | Time | Q | Rank |
| # | Lane | Name | 50m | 100m | Time | Q | Rank |
|---|---|---|---|---|---|---|---|
| 1 | 4 | United States | | | 3:38.32 | Q | 1 |
| | | Dana Vollmer | 26.47 | 54.96 | 54.96 | Olympic | |
| | | Lacey Nymeyer | 26.00 | 5378. | 1:48.74 | Olympic | |
| | | Amanda Weir | 26.04 | 54.68 | 2:43.42 | Olympic | |
| | | Kara Lynn Joyce | 26.56 | 54.90 | 3:38.32 | Olympic | |
| 2 | 5 | France | | | 3:40.81 | Q | 7 |
| | | Céline Couderc | 26.46 | 55.30 | 55.30 | Olympic | |
| | | Malia Metella | 25.93 | 55.05 | 1:50.35 | Olympic | |
| | | Aurore Mongel | 26.54 | 55.04 | 2:45.39 | Olympic | |
| | | Alena Popchanka | 26.53 | 55.42 | 3:40.81 | Olympic | |
| 3 | 3 | Canada | | | 3:43.17 | | 10 |
| | | Victoria Poon | 27.15 | 56.78 | 56.78 | Olympic | |
| | | Julia Wilkinson | 26.69 | 55.79 | 1:52.57 | Olympic | |
| | | Geneviève Saumur | 26.68 | 55.75 | 2:48.32 | Olympic | |
| | | Erica Morningstar | 26.19 | 54.85 | 3:43.17 | Olympic | |
| 4 | 6 | Japan | | | 3:45.61 | | 13 |
| | | Maki Mita | 27.66 | 56.48 | 56.48 | | |
| | | Norie Urabe | 27.00 | 55.96 | 1:52.44 | | |
| | | Haruka Ueda | 27.44 | 56.32 | 2:48.76 | | |
| | | Yuka Kato | 26.61 | 56.85 | 3:45.61 | | |
| 5 | 2 | Estonia | | | 3:47.45 | | 15 |
| | | Jana Kolukanova | 27.39 | 56.84 | 56.84 | | |
| | | Triin Aljand | 27.09 | 57.01 | 1:53.85 | | |
| | | Maria Albert | 27.03 | 56.54 | 2:50.39 | | |
| | | Elina Partõka | 26.99 | 57.06 | 3:47.45 | | |
| 6 | 8 | Macau | | | 4:09.05 | | 20 |
| | | Cheok Mei Ma | 28.25 | 59.23 | 59.23 | | |
| | | Weng I Kuan | 29.81 | 1:02.51 | 2:01.74 | | |
| | | On Kei Lei | 29.64 | 1:03.18 | 3:04.92 | | |
| | | Man Wai Fong | 30.37 | 1:04.13 | 4:09.05 | | |
| 7 | 1 | Uzbekistan | | | 4:12.94 | | 21 |
| | | Irina Shlemova | 28.84 | 1:00.06 | 1:00.06 | | |
| | | Yulduz Kuchkarova | 30.57 | 1:03.42 | 2:03.48 | | |
| | | Ekaterina Mamatkulova | 30.78 | 1:05.07 | 3:08.55 | | |
| | | Mariya Bukakova | 29.62 | 1:04.39 | 4:12.94 | | |
| 8 | 7 | Venezuela | | | DSQ | | |
| | | Ximena Vilar | 28.08 | 59.29 | 59.29 | | |
| | | Erin Volcán | 27.90 | 58.45 | 1:57.74 | | |
| | | Yanel Pinto | . | :. | :. | | |
| | | Arlene Semeco | . | :. | :. | | |

==== Heat 4 ====
| # | Lane | Country | 50m | 100m | Time | Q | Rank |
| # | Lane | Name | 50m | 100m | Time | Q | Rank |
|---|---|---|---|---|---|---|---|
| 1 | 5 | Netherlands | | | 3:40.01 | Q | 2 |
| | | Chantal Groot | 26.76 | 55.68 | 55.68 | Olympic | |
| | | Ranomi Kromowidjojo | 26.20 | 54.95 | 1:50.63 | Olympic | |
| | | Femke Heemskerk | 26.28 | 54.83 | 2:45.46 | Olympic | |
| | | Marleen Veldhuis | 25.59 | 54.55 | 3:40.01 | Olympic | |
| 2 | 4 | Germany | | | 3:40.55 | Q | 5 |
| | | Petra Dallmann | 26.60 | 55.47 | 55.47 | Olympic | |
| | | Annika Lurz | 25.97 | 54.92 | 1:50.39 | Olympic | |
| | | Meike Freitag | 26.15 | 55.19 | 2:45.58 | Olympic | |
| | | Britta Steffen | 26.13 | 54.97 | 3:40.55 | Olympic | |
| 3 | 3 | (United Kingdom) Great Britain | | | 3:41.28 | Q | 8 |
| | | Francesca Halsall | 26.33 | 55.19 | 55.19 | Olympic | |
| | | Melanie Marshall | 25.95 | 54.65 | 1:49.84 | Olympic | |
| | | Julia Beckett | 26.49 | 55.76 | 2:45.60 | Olympic | |
| | | Rosalind Brett | 26.33 | 55.68 | 3:41.28 | Olympic | |
| 4 | 2 | Ukraine | | | 3:43.52 | | 11 |
| | | Darya Stepanyuk | 26.88 | 56.00 | 56.00 | Olympic | |
| | | Oxana Serikova | 26.55 | 56.21 | 1:52.21 | Olympic | |
| | | Ganna Dzerkal | 26.46 | 56.21 | 2:48.42 | Olympic | |
| | | Iryna Amshennikova | 26.19 | 55.10 | 3:43.52 | Olympic | |
| 5 | 5 | New Zealand | | | 3:43.56 | | 12 |
| | | Hannah McLean | 27.34 | 55.27 | 55.27 | Olympic | |
| | | Alison Fitch | 26.80 | 55.99 | 1:51.26 | Olympic | |
| | | Lauren Boyle | 26.60 | 55.68 | 2:46.94 | Olympic | |
| | | Helen Norfolk | 27.03 | 56.62 | 3:43.56 | Olympic | |
| 6 | 7 | Hong Kong | | | 3:49.65 | | 16 |
| | | Hang Yu Sze | 27.54 | 57.88 | 57.88 | | |
| | | Hiu Wai Sherry Tsai | 27.84 | 56.72 | 1:54.60 | | |
| | | Man Yi Yvette Kong | 27.35 | 58.35 | 2:52.95 | | |
| | | Hannah Jane Arnett Wilson | 26.90 | 56.70 | 3:49.65 | | |
| 7 | 1 | Singapore | | | 3:59.92 | | 17 |
| | | Lynette Ng | 28.09 | 59.15 | 59.15 | | |
| | | Ting Wen Quah | 29.29 | 1:02.00 | 2:01.15 | | |
| | | Mylene Ong | 28.08 | 58.44 | 2:59.59 | | |
| | | Ruth Ho | 29.17 | 1:00.33 | 3:59.92 | | |
| 8 | 8 | Jordan | | | 4:19.28 | | 26 |
| | | Hiba Bashouti | 31.28 | 1:05.99 | 1:05.99 | | |
| | | Layla Alghul | 30.19 | 1:03.43 | 2:09.42 | | |
| | | Razan Taha | 31.00 | 1:06.11 | 3:15.53 | | |
| | | Miriam Hatamleh | 30.46 | 1:03.75 | 4:19.28 | | |
