= Swimming at the 2008 Summer Olympics – Women's 4 × 200 metre freestyle relay =

Women's 4 × 200 metre freestyle relay at the Games of the XXIX Olympiad
- Venue: Beijing National Aquatics Center
- Date: 13 August 2008 (heats); August 14, 2008 (final)
- Competitors: 75 from 16 nations
- Teams: 16
- Winning time: 7:44.31 WR

Medalists
1st place, gold medalist(s)		Stephanie Rice, Bronte Barratt, Kylie Palmer, Linda Mackenzie, Felicity Galvez*, Angie Bainbridge*, Melanie Schlanger*, Lara Davenport*	Australia
2nd place, silver medalist(s)		Yang Yu, Zhu Qianwei, Tan Miao, Pang Jiaying, Tang Jingzhi*	China
3rd place, bronze medalist(s)		Allison Schmitt, Natalie Coughlin, Caroline Burckle, Katie Hoff, Christine Marshall*, Kim Vandenberg*, Julia Smit*; *Indicates the swimmer only competed in the preliminary heats.	United States

The women's 4 × 200 metre freestyle relay event at the 2008 Olympic Games took place on 13–14 August at the Beijing National Aquatics Center in Beijing, China.

For the first time since the event's inception in 1996, the Aussies smashed a new world record to overhaul the undefeated Americans for an Olympic title with a benefit of a sterling opening leg from Stephanie Rice. Starting the program's longest relay race with a remarkable Oceanian-record split of 1:56.60, Rice and her teammates Bronte Barratt (1:56.58), Kylie Palmer (1:55.22), and Linda Mackenzie (1:55.91) registered a gold-medal time of 7:44.31 to shave nearly six seconds off the previous world record set by their greatest rivals in 2007.

China's Pang Jiaying expanded her stretch over U.S. swimmer Katie Hoff with an anchor of 1:54.39 to deliver the foursome of Yang Yu (1:56.79), Zhu Qianwei (1:56.64), and Tan Miao (1:58.11) a superb Asian record time of 7:45.93, and a silver medal for the host nation. After a disappointing Olympic campaign, the U.S. team of Allison Schmitt (1:57.71), Natalie Coughlin (1:57.19), Caroline Burckle (1:56.70), and Hoff (1:54.73) finally found the best form on the blazing anchor leg to end the race for the bronze in 7:46.33, finishing nearly four seconds under the old world record.

Italy's Renata Spagnolo (1:58.31), Alessia Filippi (1:56.68), Flavia Zoccari (1:59.80), and Federica Pellegrini (1:54.97) missed out the podium by over three seconds with a fourth-place time and a European record of 7:49.76. Meanwhile, the French quartet of Coralie Balmy (1:56.57), Ophélie-Cyrielle Étienne (1:57.95), Aurore Mongel (1:58.62), and Camille Muffat (1:57.52) occupied the fifth spot in 7:50.66. Earlier in the prelims, Muffat (1:57.32), Balmy (1:55.86), Céline Couderc (1:58.92), and Alena Popchanka (1:58.27), previously competed for Belarus in three Games, established a new Olympic record of 7:50.37 to close the session with a final top seed. Hungary (7:55.53), Japan (7:57.56), and Sweden (7:59.83) rounded out the field. For the first time in Olympic history, all eight teams finished the race under eight minutes due to the presence of technology suits.

== Records ==
Prior to this competition, the existing world and Olympic records were as follows.

World record	United States (USA); Natalie Coughlin (1:56.43); Dana Vollmer (1:57.49); Lacey Nymeyer (1:59.19); Katie Hoff (1:56.98)	7:50.09	Melbourne, Australia	29 March 2007	
Olympic record	United States; Natalie Coughlin (1:57.74); Carly Piper (1:59.39); Dana Vollmer (1:58.12); Kaitlin Sandeno (1:58.17)	7:53.42	Athens, Greece	18 August 2004	-

The following new world and Olympic records were set during this competition.

Date	Event	Name	Nationality	Time	Record
August 13	Heat 1	Alena Popchanka (1:58.27); Céline Couderc (1:58.92); Camille Muffat (1:57.32); Coralie Balmy (1:55.86)	France	7:50.37	OR
August 14	Final	Stephanie Rice (1:56.60) =OC; Bronte Barratt (1:56.58); Kylie Palmer (1:55.22); Linda Mackenzie (1:55.91)	Australia	7:44.31	WR

== Results ==
=== Heats ===
Rank	Heat	Lane	Nationality	Names	Time	Notes
1	1	4	France	Alena Popchanka (1:58.27); Céline Couderc (1:58.92); Camille Muffat (1:57.32); Coralie Balmy (1:55.86)	7:50.37	Q, OR, ER
2	2	4	United States	Caroline Burckle (1:57.86); Christine Marshall (1:58.58); Kim Vandenberg (1:58.31); Julia Smit (1:57.68)	7:52.43	Q
3	2	3	Italy	Renata Spagnolo (1:58.91); Flavia Zoccari (1:58.88); Alice Carpanese (1:59.50); Federica Pellegrini (1:56.09)	7:53.38	Q, NR
4	1	2	China	Yang Yu (1:57.49); Tan Miao (1:58.84); Tang Jingzhi (2:00.20); Zhu Qianwei (1:57.24)	7:53.77	Q, AS
5	1	6	Sweden	Gabriella Fagundez (1:58.43); Ida Marko-Varga (1:58.40); Petra Granlund (1:59.67); Josefin Lillhage (1:57.33)	7:53.83	Q, NR
6	2	6	Australia	Felicity Galvez (1:58.00); Angie Bainbridge (1:58.17); Melanie Schlanger (2:00.99); Lara Davenport (1:57.94)	7:55.10	Q
7	2	7	Hungary	Ágnes Mutina (1:59.42); Evelyn Verrasztó (1:56.92); Eszter Dara (2:00.45); Zsuzsanna Jakabos (1:58.47)	7:55.26	Q, NR
8	2	2	Japan	Haruka Ueda (1:58.09); Misaki Yamaguchi (1:57.93); Emi Takanabe (2:01.28); Maki Mita (1:58.33)	7:55.63	Q, NR
9	2	5	Great Britain	Joanne Jackson (1:57.70); Melanie Marshall (1:58.44); Hannah Miley (1:59.95); Francesca Halsall (2:00.07)	7:56.16	
10	1	1	Canada	Stephanie Horner (1:58.00); Geneviève Saumur (1:59.23); Erica Morningstar (2:00.91); Julia Wilkinson (1:58.12)	7:56.26	NR
11	1	3	Netherlands	Femke Heemskerk (1:58.29); Ranomi Kromowidjojo (1:58.29); Saskia de Jonge (2:00.71); Manon van Rooijen (1:59.31)	7:56.60	
12	1	5	Germany	Meike Freitag (1:58.09); Petra Dallmann (1:59.55); Daniela Samulski (2:01.67); Annika Lurz (1:58.80)	7:58.11	
13	2	1	Denmark	Julie Hjorth-Hansen (1:59.16); Micha Kathrine Østergaard Jensen (2:01.67); Louise Mai Jansen (2:00.31); Lotte Friis (1:59.67)	8:00.81	NR
14	1	7	Spain	Melania Costa (2:00.92); María Fuster (2:00.00); Noemi Féliz García (1:59.77); Arantxa Ramos (2:00.21)	8:00.90	NR
15	1	8	Poland	Paulina Barzycka (2:00.99); Katarzyna Wilk (2:02.78); Karolina Szczepaniak (2:01.94); Katarzyna Baranowska (2:01.69)	8:07.40	
	2	8	New Zealand	Helen Norfolk (2:00.24); Lauren Boyle (1:58.01); Hayley Palmer (1:59.92); Natasha Hind	DSQ	

=== Final ===
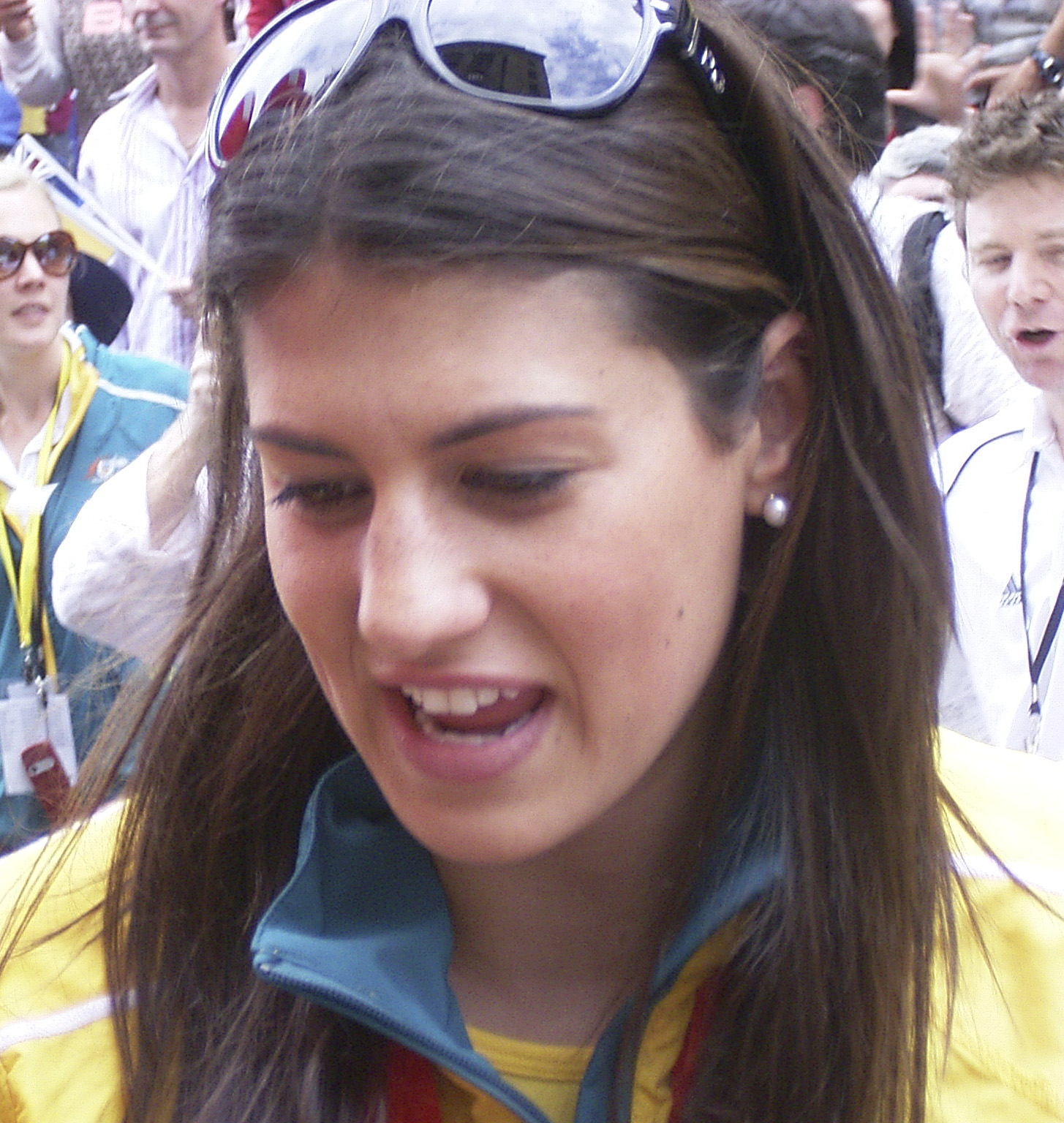
Stephanie Rice of Australia

Rank	Lane	Nationality	Name	Time	Time behind	Notes
1st place, gold medalist(s)	7	Australia	Stephanie Rice (1:56.60) =OC; Bronte Barratt (1:56.58); Kylie Palmer (1:55.22); Linda Mackenzie (1:55.91)	7:44.31		WR
2nd place, silver medalist(s)	6	China	Yang Yu (1:56.79); Zhu Qianwei (1:56.64); Tan Miao (1:58.11); Pang Jiaying (1:54.39)	7:45.93	1.62	AS
3rd place, bronze medalist(s)	5	United States	Allison Schmitt (1:57.71); Natalie Coughlin (1:57.19); Caroline Burckle (1:56.70); Katie Hoff (1:54.73)	7:46.33	2.02	AM
4	3	Italy	Renata Spagnolo (1:58.31); Alessia Filippi (1:56.68); Flavia Zoccari (1:59.80); Federica Pellegrini (1:54.97)	7:49.76	5.45	ER
5	4	France	Coralie Balmy (1:56.57); Ophélie-Cyrielle Étienne (1:57.95); Aurore Mongel (1:58.62); Camille Muffat (1:57.52)	7:50.66	6.35	
6	1	Hungary	Ágnes Mutina (1:58.17); Evelyn Verrasztó (1:57.80); Eszter Dara (2:00.39); Zsuzsanna Jakabos (1:59.17)	7:55.53	11.22	
7	8	Japan	Haruka Ueda (1:58.44); Misaki Yamaguchi (1:58.51); Maki Mita (1:58.78); Emi Takanabe (2:01.83)	7:57.56	13.25	
8	2	Sweden	Josefin Lillhage (2:00.48); Gabriella Fagundez (2:00.09); Ida Marko-Varga (1:58.58); Petra Granlund (2:00.68)	7:59.83	15.52	
