= Swimming at the 2008 Summer Olympics – Women's 4 × 100 metre freestyle relay =

Women's 4 × 100 metre freestyle relay at the Games of the XXIX Olympiad
- Venue: Beijing National Aquatics Center
- Date: August 9, 2008 (heats); August 10, 2008 (final)
- Competitors: 67 from 16 nations
- Teams: 16
- Winning time: 3:33.76 OR

Medalists
1st place, gold medalist(s)		Inge Dekker, Ranomi Kromowidjojo, Femke Heemskerk, Marleen Veldhuis, Hinkelien Schreuder*, Manon van Rooijen*	Netherlands
2nd place, silver medalist(s)		Natalie Coughlin, Lacey Nymeyer, Kara Lynn Joyce, Dara Torres, Emily Silver*, Julia Smit*	United States
3rd place, bronze medalist(s)		Cate Campbell, Alice Mills, Melanie Schlanger, Lisbeth Trickett, Shayne Reese*; *Indicates the swimmer only competed in the preliminary heats.	Australia

The women's 4 × 100 metre freestyle relay event at the 2008 Olympic Games took place on 9–10 August at the Beijing National Aquatics Center in Beijing, China.

The Dutch women reinforced their claim to become the strongest team in the world with a magnificent triumph over the Aussies and the Americans in the event. Pulling nearly a worst-to-first effort from a seventh-place turn by Inge Dekker (54.37), Ranomi Kromowidjojo (53.39) and Femke Heemskerk (53.42) moved the team further into the top spot, until they handed Marleen Veldhuis the anchor duties on the final exchange to cruise the field down the stretch in 52.58 and to snatch the freestyle relay title with an Olympic record of 3:33.76.

Competing in her fifth Olympics since 1984, U.S. legend Dara Torres anchored her team with a remarkable split of 52.44, the second-fastest of all time, to deliver the foursome of Natalie Coughlin (54.00), Lacey Nymeyer (53.91), and Kara Lynn Joyce (53.98) a silver medal in a new American record of 3:34.33. Meanwhile, Australia's Cate Campbell (54.43), Alice Mills (54.43), Melanie Schlanger (53.85), and Lisbeth Trickett (52.34) powered home with a bronze in an Oceanian record of 3:35.05, holding off the fast-pacing Chinese squad of Zhu Yingwen (54.12), Tang Yi (54.19), Xu Yanwei (54.64), and Pang Jiaying (52.69) by 59-hundredths of a second, a superb Asian standard of 3:35.64.

Britta Steffen shaved off Jodie Henry's 2004 Olympic record by 0.15 seconds with a blazing split of 53.38 to take an early lead for the Germans, but the other threesome of Meike Freitag (54.30), Daniela Götz (55.34), and Antje Buschschulte (53.83) could not maintain their pace and thereby occupied the fifth spot in 3:36.85. France (3:37.68), Great Britain (3:38.18), and Canada (3:38.32) picked up the remaining places to complete a close finish.

== Records ==
Prior to this competition, the existing world and Olympic records were as follows.

World record	Netherlands; Inge Dekker (53.77); Ranomi Kromowidjojo (53.61); Femke Heemskerk (53.62); Marleen Veldhuis (52.62)	3:33.62	Eindhoven, Netherlands	18 March 2008	
Olympic record	Australia; Alice Mills (54.75); Lisbeth Lenton (53.57); Petria Thomas (54.67); Jodie Henry (52.95)	3:35.94	Athens, Greece	14 August 2004	-

The following new world and Olympic records were set during this competition.

Date	Event	Name	Nationality	Time	Record
August 10	Final	Inge Dekker (54.37); Ranomi Kromowidjojo (53.39); Femke Heemskerk (53.42); Marleen Veldhuis (52.58)	Netherlands	3:33.76	OR

== Results ==
=== Heats ===
Rank	Heat	Lane	Nationality	Name	Time	Notes
1	1	3	China	Zhu Yingwen (54.53); Tang Yi (54.29); Xu Yanwei (55.13); Pang Jiaying (52.83)	3:36.78	Q, AS
2	1	5	Germany	Meike Freitag (54.53); Antje Buschschulte (54.29); Daniela Götz (54.54); Britta Steffen (54.16)	3:37.52	Q
3	2	5	United States	Kara Lynn Joyce (54.13); Julia Smit (54.73); Emily Silver (54.81); Lacey Nymeyer (53.86)	3:37.53	Q
4	2	4	Netherlands	Ranomi Kromowidjojo (54.41); Hinkelien Schreuder (55.31); Femke Heemskerk (53.58); Manon van Rooijen (54.31)	3:37.61	Q
5	2	6	France	Céline Couderc (53.97); Hanna Shcherba-Lorgeril (54.95); Ophélie-Cyrielle Étienne (54.72); Alena Popchanka (54.12)	3:37.76	Q, NR
6	1	4	Australia	Cate Campbell (54.65); Alice Mills (54.55); Melanie Schlanger (54.69); Shayne Reese (53.92)	3:37.81	Q
7	2	2	Canada	Julia Wilkinson (54.48); Erica Morningstar (54.38); Geneviève Saumur (55.11); Audrey Lacroix (54.85)	3:38.82	Q, NR
8	1	6	Great Britain	Francesca Halsall (54.36); Caitlin McClatchey (54.42); Julia Beckett (55.64); Melanie Marshall (54.76)	3:39.18	Q, NR
9	1	1	Japan	Haruka Ueda (55.13); Misaki Yamaguchi (54.14); Asami Kitagawa (54.47); Maki Mita (55.51)	3:39.25	NR
10	1	8	Italy	Erika Ferraioli (56.10); Federica Pellegrini (53.42); Maria Laura Simonetto (55.97); Cristina Chiuso (54.93)	3:40.42	NR
11	2	3	Sweden	Ida Marko-Varga (55.04); Therese Alshammar (54.80); Anna-Karin Kammerling (55.06); Claire Hedenskog (55.62)	3:40.52	
12	1	2	Russia	Anastasia Aksenova (56.57); Yelena Sokolova (55.20); Daria Belyakina (55.23); Svetlana Karpeeva (55.52)	3:42.52	
13	1	7	Brazil	Tatiana Barbosa (55.08); Flavia Cazziolato (56.13); Michelle Lenhardt (55.90); Monique Ferreira (55.74)	3:42.85	
14	2	1	Ukraine	Darya Stepanyuk (55.79); Kateryna Dikidzhi (55.44); Ganna Dzerkal (56.95); Nataliya Khudyakova (56.54)	3:44.72	
15	2	7	South Africa	Melissa Corfe (55.93); Wendy Trott (57.83); Mandy Loots (58.31); Kathryn Meaklim (59.07)	3:51.14	
	2	8	Belarus		DNS	

=== Final ===
Rank	Lane	Nationality	Names	Time	Time behind	Notes
1st place, gold medalist(s)	6	Netherlands	Inge Dekker (54.37); Ranomi Kromowidjojo (53.39); Femke Heemskerk (53.42); Marleen Veldhuis (52.58)	3:33.76		OR
2nd place, silver medalist(s)	3	United States	Natalie Coughlin (54.00); Lacey Nymeyer (53.91); Kara Lynn Joyce (53.98); Dara Torres (52.44)	3:34.33	0.57	AM
3rd place, bronze medalist(s)	7	Australia	Cate Campbell (54.43); Alice Mills (54.43); Melanie Schlanger (53.85); Lisbeth Trickett (52.34)	3:35.05	1.29	OC
4	4	China	Zhu Yingwen (54.12); Tang Yi (54.19); Xu Yanwei (54.64); Pang Jiaying (52.69)	3:35.64	1.88	AS
5	5	Germany	Britta Steffen (53.38) OR; Meike Freitag (54.30); Daniela Götz (55.34); Antje Buschschulte (53.83)	3:36.85	3.09	
6	2	France	Céline Couderc (54.32); Alena Popchanka (54.54); Ophélie-Cyrielle Étienne (54.79); Malia Metella (54.03)	3:37.68	3.92	NR
7	8	Great Britain	Francesca Halsall (53.81) NR; Caitlin McClatchey (54.48); Jessica Sylvester (55.34); Melanie Marshall (54.55)	3:38.18	4.42	NR
8	1	Canada	Julia Wilkinson (54.33); Erica Morningstar (54.35); Geneviève Saumur (54.68); Audrey Lacroix (54.96)	3:38.32	4.56	NR
