= Swimming at the 2007 World Aquatics Championships – Men's 4 × 100 metre medley relay =

Men's 4 × 100 metre medley relay at the 2007 FINA World Championships
- Venue: Rod Laver Arena
- Date: 1 April 2007
- Teams: 33
- Winning time: 3 minutes 34.93 seconds

Medalists
gold medal	Matt Welsh; Brenton Rickard; Andrew Lauterstein; Eamon Sullivan	Australia
silver medal	Tomomi Morita; Kosuke Kitajima; Takashi Yamamoto; Daisuke Hosokawa	Japan
bronze medal	Arkady Vyatchanin; Dmitry Komornikov; Nikolay Skvortsov; Yevgeny Lagunov	Russia

The men's 4 × 100 metre medley relay at the 2007 World Aquatics Championships took place on 1 April 2007 at the Rod Laver Arena in Melbourne, Australia. The top-12 finishers from this race qualified for the event at the 2008 Olympics.

The existing records when the event started were:

- World record (WR): 3:30.68, USA (Peirsol, Hansen, Crocker, Lezak), 21 August 2004 in Athens, Greece.
- Championship record (CR): 3:31.54, (USA) (Peirsol, Hansen, Crocker, Lezak), Barcelona 2003 (27 July 2003)

== Results ==
=== Finals ===
Place	Nation	Swimmers	Time	Note
1	Australia	Matt Welsh (54.78); Brenton Rickard (59.63); Andrew Lauterstein (52.63); Eamon Sullivan (47.89)	3:34.93	
2	Japan	Tomomi Morita (54.76); Kosuke Kitajima (59.23); Takashi Yamamoto (51.90); Daisuke Hosokawa (49.27)	3:35.16	
3	Russia	Arkady Vyatchanin (54.08); Dmitry Komornikov (1:00.65); Nikolay Skvortsov (52.13); Evgeny Lagunov (48.65)	3:35.51	
4	South Africa	Gerhard Zandberg (54.57); Cameron van der Burgh (1:01.20); Lyndon Ferns (52.12); Ryk Neethling (48.03)	3:35.92	
5	(United Kingdom) Great Britain	Liam Tancock (54.08); James Gibson (1:00.62); Matthew Bowe (53.01); Simon Burnett (48.47)	3:36.18	
6	Italy	Damiano Lestingi (55.58); Loris Facci (1:01.44); Rudy Goldin (52.63); Christian Galenda (48.02)	3:37.67	
7	France	Simon Dufour (56.46); Hugues Duboscq (1:00.61); Amaury Leveaux (52.42); Alain Bernard (48.36)	3:37.85	
8	Romania	Răzvan Florea (54.99); Valentin Preda (1:00.98); Ioan Gherghel (53.13); Octavian Guţu (49.76)	3:38.86	

=== Heats ===
Rank	Nation	Swimmers	Time	Note
1	(Japan)	Masafumi Yamaguchi (55.21), Kosuke Kitajima (59.49), Takashi Yamamoto (52.79), Daisuke Hosokawa (49.55)	3:37.04	Q Olympic
2	Russia	Arkady Vyatchanin (Russia), Roman Sloudnov (1:00.94), Nikolay Skvortsov (52.34), Andrey Kapralov (48.69)	3:37.16	Q Olympic
3	South Africa	Gerhard Zandberg (55.60), Cameron van der Burgh (1:01.54), Lyndon Ferns (51.82), Ryk Neethling (48.21)	3:37.17	Q Olympic
4	Australia	Hayden Stoeckel (55.18), Brenton Rickard (1:00.60), Michael Klim (53.38), Kenrick Monk (49.42)	3:38.58	Q Olympic
5	France	Simon Dufour (56.31), Hugues Duboscq (1:00.55), Amaury Leveaux (52.78), Alain Bernard (48.99)	3:38.63	Q Olympic
6	(United Kingdom) Great Britain	Matthew Clay (55.36), Chris Cook (1:01.06), Matthew Bowe (52.66), Simon Burnett (49.56)	3:38.64	Q Olympic
7	Italy	Damiano Lestingi (55.88), Loris Facci (1:00.87), Rudy Goldin (52.91), Christian Galenda (49.13)	3:38.79	Q Olympic
8	Romania	Răzvan Florea (55.41), Valentin Preda (1:01.16), Ioan Gherghel (53.01), Octavian Guţu (49.75)	3:39.33	Q Olympic
9	Brazil	Thiago Pereira (55.64), Henrique Barbosa (1:01.50), Gabriel Mangabeira (53.53), César Cielo Filho (48.67)	3:39.34	Olympic
10	Ukraine	Andriy Oleynyk (56.71), Valeriy Dymo (1:00.26), Andriy Serdinov (52.64), Yuriy Yegoshin (50.10)	3:39.71	Olympic
11	New Zealand	Cameron Gibson (55.70), Glenn Snyders (1:01.50), Corney Swanepoel (52.46), Mark Herring (50.63)	3:40.29	Olympic
12	Belarus	Pavel Sankovich (56.10), Mikalai Vasilyeu (1:02.34), Yauheni Lazuka (52.81), Stanislau Neviarouski (49.38)	3:40.63	Olympic
13	(China)	OUYANG Kunpeng (56.12), LAI Zhongjian (1:02.05), WANG Dong (53.10), CHEN Zuo (50.06)	3:41.33	
14	Lithuania	Vytautas Janušaitis (55.73), Giedrius Titenis (1:01.76), Paulius Andrijauskas (54.19), Paulius Viktoravicius (49.68)	3:41.36	
15	(Germany)	Helge Meeuw (56.40), Johannes Neumann (1:02.35), Benjamin Starke (53.56), Michael Schubert (49.19)	3:41.50	
16	Canada	Matt Rose (57.22), Mike Brown (1:02.04), Brian Johns (54.04), Brent Hayden (48.64)	3:41.94	
17	Norway	Kim Torry Simmenes (57.67), Alexander Dale Oen (59.92), Aleksander Hetland (55.37), Robin Dale Oen (49.92)	3:42.88	
18	Israel	Ehud Segal (56.33), Michael Malul (1:03.32), Guy Marcus Barnea (53.28), Shai Liwnat (50.03)	3:42.96	
19	Croatia	Ivan Tolic (58.05), Nikola Delic (1:03.94), Mario Todorović (53.44), Dominik Straga (50.93)	3:46.36	
20	Kazakhstan	Stanislav Ossinskiy (57.71), Yevgeniy Ryzhkov (1:04.37), Stanislav Kuzmin (55.09), Vitaliy Khan (50.17)	3:47.34	
21	Greece	Georgios Demetis (57.28), Romanos Alyfantis (1:02.42), Ioannis Giannoulis (58.55), Andreas Zisimos (50.05)	3:48.30	
22	Uzbekistan	Danil Bugakov (58.44), Andrey Morkovin (1:06.00), Oleg Lyashko (55.20), Petr Romashkin (51.38)	3:51.02	
23	Indonesia	Felix Sutanto (59.55), Billy Arfianto (1:06.47), Andy Wibowo (56.00), Albert Sutanto (53.74)	3:55.76	
24	Singapore	ONG Wei Shien Zach (1:01.14), TAN Jin Leonard (1:06.46), TAN Xue-Wei Nicholas (57.62), TAY Zhirong Bryan (52.17)	3:57.39	
25	Peru	Carlos Eduardo Gil (1:02.29), Gianmarco Mosto (1:08.64), Jose Emmanuel Crescimbeni (55.73), Nikola Ustadvich (55.33)	4:01.99	
26	India	Sandeep Nagar Anthal (1:01.83), Rehan Poncha (1:12.63), Ankur Poseria (55.49), Virdhawal Khade (54.26)	4:04.21	
27	Guam	Carlos Shimizu (1:15.08), Celestino Aguon (1:10.92), Hernan Bonsembiante (1:04.61), Christopher Duenas (54.67)	4:25.28	
28	Guyana	Onan Thom (1:04.12), Niall Roberts (1:24.17), Jamaal Sobers (1:06.78), Yannick Roberts (59.60)	4:34.67	
--	(United States Virgin Islands) Virgin Islands		DNS	
--	Nigeria		DNS	
--	Switzerland	Flori Lang, Dimitri Waeber, Damien Courtois, Dominik Meichtry	DQ	
--	Kenya	David Dunford, Amar Shah, Jason Dunford, Rama Vyombo	DQ	
--	USA	Ryan Lochte, Scott Usher, Ian Crocker, Neil Walker	DQ	

== See also ==
- Swimming at the 2005 World Aquatics Championships – Men's 4 × 100 metre medley relay
- Swimming at the 2008 Summer Olympics – Men's 4 × 100 metre medley relay
- Swimming at the 2009 World Aquatics Championships – Men's 4 × 100 metre medley relay
