= Swimming at the 2009 World Aquatics Championships – Women's 4 × 200 metre freestyle relay =

The Women's 4x200m Freestyle Relay at the 2009 World Aquatics Championships took place on July 30, 2009 at the Foro Italico in Rome, Italy.

== Records ==
Prior to the competition, the existing world and championship records were as follows:

World Record	Australia (AUS); Stephanie Rice (1:56.60); Bronte Barratt (1:56.58); Kylie Palmer (1:55.22); Linda Mackenzie (1:55.91)	7:44.31	Beijing, China	14 August 2008
Championship Record	United States (USA); Natalie Coughlin (1:56.43); Dana Vollmer (1:57.49); Lacey Nymeyer (1:59.19); Katie Hoff (1:56.98)	7:50.09	Melbourne, Australia	29 March 2007

The following records were established during the competition:

Date	Round	Nation	Time	Record
30 July	Heat 1	United Kingdom; Caitlin McClatchey (1:57.54); Jazmin Carlin (1:56.45); Hannah Miley (1:58.15); Rebecca Adlington (1:56.90)	7:49.04	CR
30 July	Final	China; Yang Yu (1:55.47); Zhu Qianwei (1:55.79); Liu Jing (1:56.09); Pang Jiaying (1:54.73)	7:42.08	WR

== Results ==
=== Heats ===
Rank	Heat	Lane	Nation	Swimmers	Time	Notes
1	1	3	Great Britain	Caitlin McClatchey (1:57.54); Jazmin Carlin (1:56.45); Hannah Miley (1:58.15); Rebecca Adlington (1:56.90)	7:49.04	CR, ER
2	1	4	United States	Ariana Kukors (1:56.05); Dagny Knutson (1:57.73); Alyssa Anderson (1:58.35); Lacey Nymeyer (1:57.38)	7:49.51	
3	2	5	France	Camille Muffat (1:58.82); Ophelie-Cyrielle Etienne (1:56.36); Sophie Huber (1:58.82); Coralie Balmy (1:56.18)	7:50.18	NR
4	3	6	Canada	Geneviève Saumur (1:57.67); Julia Wilkinson (1:57.77); Alexandra Gabor (1:57.87); Heather MacLean (1:56.98)	7:50.29	NR
5	3	4	Australia	Ellen Fullerton (1:58.56); Felicity Galvez (1:57.70); Merindah Dingjan (1:56.85); Bronte Barratt (1:57.42)	7:50.53	
6	2	4	China	Yang Yu (1:58.50); Zhu Qianwei (1:57.85); Liu Jing (1:55.78); Pang Jiaying (1:58.67)	7:50.80	
7	3	3	Hungary	Ágnes Mutina (1:57.52); Evelyn Verrasztó (1:56.89); Eszter Dara (1:57.87); Zsuzsanna Jakabos (1:59.02)	7:51.30	NR
8	3	5	Italy	Renata Fabiola Spagnolo (1:59.32); Flavia Zoccari (1:59.29); Alice Carpanese (1:58.45); Federica Pellegrini (1:54.94)	7:52.00	
9	2	3	Japan	Haruka Ueda (1:57.38) NR; Misaki Yamaguchi (1:56.86); Ren Sato (1:57.43); Asami Kitagawa (2:00.75)	7:52.42	NR
10	2	6	Netherlands	Saskia de Jonge (2:00.51); Femke Heemskerk (1:55.49); Inge Dekker (1:56.96); Chantal Groot (2:00.88)	7:53.84	NR
11	1	2	Russia	Daria Belyakina (1:58.68); Victoria Malutina (1:58.71); Anastasia Aksenova (1:59.27); Elena Sokolova (1:58.69)	7:55.35	NR
12	1	6	Denmark	Julie Hjorth-Hansen (1:57.61) NR; Micha Kathrine Østergaard Jensen (1:59.29); Louise Mai Jansen (1:59.74); Lotte Friis (1:58.92)	7:55.56	NR
13	1	5	Sweden	Gabriella Fagundez (1:58.42); Sarah Sjöström (1:56.61); Petra Granlund (1:59.24); Martina Granström (2:02.36)	7:56.63	
14	3	2	Slovenia	Sara Isakovič (1:57.51); Anja Klinar (2:00.73); Nina Sovinek (2:04.60); Nika Karlina Petric (2:04.07)	8:06.91	
15	3	7	Ireland	Melanie Nocher (2:02.42); Clare Dawson (2:02.50); Niamh O'Sullivan (2:01.27); Nuala Murphy (2:03.15)	8:09.34	NR
16	2	2	Singapore	Quah Ting Wen (2:00.50); Amanda Lim (2:03.80); Lynette Lim (2:01.88); Mylene Ong (2:03.73)	8:09.91	NR
17	2	8	Poland	Karolina Szczepaniak (2:00.40); Katarzyna Wilk (2:04.11); Mirela Olczak (2:04.50); Paula Zukowska (2:04.64)	8:13.65	
18	2	7	Venezuela	Andreina Pinto (2:02.15) NR; Yanel Pinto (2:02.78); Darneyis Orozco (2:05.27); Yennifer Marquez (2:06.31)	8:16.51	NR
19	1	8	Zimbabwe	Nicole Horn (2:08.17); Kirsten Lapham (2:08.66); Moira Fraser (2:10.80); Kimberley Eeson (2:08.11)	8:35.74	NR
20	3	8	Malta	Davina Mangion (2:12.85); Melinda Sue Micallef (2:17.30); Nicol Cremona (2:13.80); Talisa Pace (2:16.60)	9:00.55	
21	1	7	Macau	Fong Man Wai (2:12.94); Che Lok In (2:19.91); Tan Chi Yan (2:20.12); Ma Cheok Mei (2:12.71)	9:05.68	
22	3	1	India	Pooja Raghava Alva (2:24.10); Chittaranjan Shubha (2:18.52); Vandita Dhariyal (2:19.37); Talasha Prabhu (2:19.71)	9:21.70	
23	2	1	Albania	Sara Abdullahu (2:12.27); Rovena Marku (2:24.37); Reni Jani (2:39.46); Debora Keci (2:29.50)	9:45.60	
24	1	1	Pakistan	Sakina Ghulam (2:27.24); Aelia Mehdi (2:45.06); Rida Mitha (2:40.32); Mahnoor Maqsood (2:38.50)	10:31.12	

=== Final ===
Rank	Lane	Nation	Swimmers	Time	Note
1st place, gold medalist(s)	7	China	Yang Yu (1:55.47); Zhu Qianwei (1:55.79); Liu Jing (1:56.09); Pang Jiaying (1:54.73)	7:42.08	WR
2nd place, silver medalist(s)	5	United States	Dana Vollmer (1:55.29); Lacey Nymeyer (1:57.88); Ariana Kukors (1:55.18); Allison Schmitt (1:54.21)	7:42.56	AM
3rd place, bronze medalist(s)	4	Great Britain	Joanne Jackson (1:55.98); Jazmin Carlin (1:56.78); Caitlin McClatchey (1:56.42); Rebecca Adlington (1:56.33)	7:45.51	ER
4	8	Italy	Renata Fabiola Spagnolo (1:58.79); Alessia Filippi (1:56.97); Alice Carpanese (1:57.36); Federica Pellegrini (1:53.45)	7:46.57	NR
5	2	Australia	Ellen Fullerton (1:57.38); Stephanie Rice (1:55.71); Merindah Dingjan (1:56.66); Bronte Barratt (1:57.10)	7:46.85	
6	1	Hungary	Ágnes Mutina (1:56.64); Evelyn Verrasztó (1:57.20); Eszter Dara (1:59.04); Katinka Hosszú (1:55.16)	7:48.04	NR
7	3	France	Coralie Balmy (1:57.12); Ophelie Cyrielle Etienne (1:56.10); Sophie Huber (1:58.40); Camille Muffat (1:56.82)	7:48.44	NR
8	6	Canada	Geneviève Saumur (1:56.97) NR; Julia Wilkinson (1:57.39); Alexandra Gabor (1:57.07); Heather MacLean (1:57.71)	7:49.14	NR
