= Lurz =

Lurz is a surname. Notable people with the surname include:

- Annika Lurz (born 1979), German swimmer
- Dagmar Lurz (born 1959), German figure skater
- Thomas Lurz (born 1979), German swimmer
