= Emi Takanabe =

Japanese swimmer (born 1985)

Personal information
- Full name: Emi Takanabe
- National team: Japan
- Born: 20 September 1990 (age 35) Kama, Fukuoka, Japan
- Height: 1.66 m (5 ft 5 in)
- Weight: 55 kg (121 lb)

Sport
- Sport: Swimming
- Strokes: Freestyle
- Club: KSG Kaho
- Coach: Takao Tananka

Emi Takanabe (高鍋 絵美, Takanabe Emi; born September 20, 1985) is a Japanese swimmer, who specialized in freestyle events. She represented her nation Japan at the 2008 Summer Olympics, placing herself in the seventh position as a member of the 4 × 200 m freestyle relay team. Takanabe is a student at National Institute of Fitness and Sports in Kanoya, Kagoshima.

Takanabe competed as a member of the Japanese team in the 4 × 200 m freestyle relay at the 2008 Summer Olympics in Beijing. Despite missing out the individual spot in the 200 m freestyle, she managed to place third at the Olympic trials in Tokyo (2:01.39) to earn an outright selection on the relay squad. Teaming with Haruka Ueda, Maki Mita, and Misaki Yamaguchi, Takanabe closed the race with a split of 2:01.83, but the Japanese team had to settle for seventh place in 7:57.56.
