= Kim Vandenberg =

American swimmer

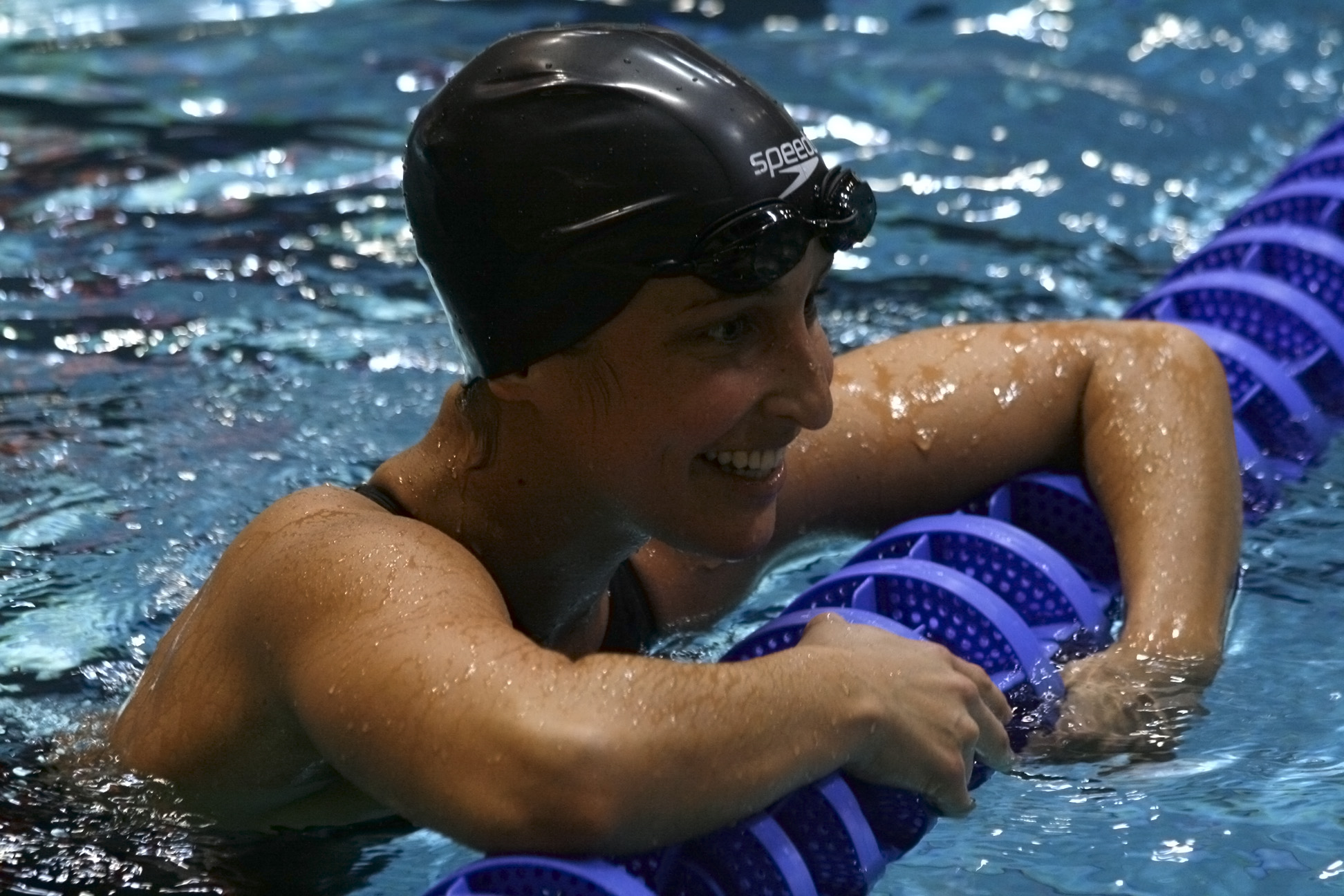

Personal information
- Full name: Kimberly Vandenberg
- National team: United States
- Born: December 13, 1983 (age 42) Berkeley, California, U.S.
- Height: 5 ft 9 in (175 cm)
- Weight: 130 lb (59 kg)

Sport
- Sport: Swimming
- Strokes: Butterfly, Freestyle
- College team: University of California, Los Angeles
- Coach: Cyndi Gallagher
Medal record
Women's swimming
Representing the United States
Olympic Games
Bronze medal – third place	2008 Beijing	4×200 m freestyle
World Championships (LC)
Silver medal – second place	2007 Melbourne	200 m butterfly
Pan American Games
Gold medal – first place	2011 Guadalajara	200 m butterfly
Gold medal – first place	2011 Guadalajara	4×200 m freestyle
Universiade
Silver medal – second place	2005 Izmir	200 m butterfly

Kimberly Vandenberg (born December 13, 1983) is an American competition swimmer and Olympic medalist.

Vandenberg grew up in Moraga, California, and swam for Campolindo High School and Orinda Aquatics. She was a member of the bronze medal-winning U.S. team in the women's 4×200-meter freestyle relay at the 2008 Summer Olympics in Beijing, swimming in the preliminary heats of the relay event. She also won silver medals at the 2005 World University Games, and at the 2007 World Swimming Championships in the women's 200-meter butterfly. Four years later, she won a gold medal in the same event at the 2011 Pan American Games in Guadalajara.

Vandenberg attended University of California, Los Angeles (UCLA) and swam for the UCLA Bruins women's swimming and diving team. She graduated from UCLA in 2007. Being one of the only U.S. Olympic swimmers to choose to train abroad, she returned to Brooklyn, in 2013 and trains with the New York Athletic Club, under head coach Romain Barnier, a former Olympian. "We have a really interesting group of international swimmers who have different experiences and who all learn from each other. It's a unique experience", said Vandenberg in an interview with Gary Hall, Sr.

Vandenberg saw the benefits of training abroad and viewing the world's different training methods.

Vandenberg is an ambassador for Room to Read, an organization that focuses on literacy and gender equality in education, and for Up2Us Sports.

== See also ==
- List of Olympic medalists in swimming (women)
- List of University of California, Los Angeles people
- List of World Aquatics Championships medalists in swimming (women)
