= Swimming at the 2007 Pan American Games – Women's 800 metre freestyle =

The Women's 800m Freestyle event at the 2007 Pan American Games took place at the Maria Lenk Aquatic Park in Rio de Janeiro, Brazil. The first two heats were held on 2007-07-19, while the fastest heat based on entry times was staged a day later.

== Medalists ==
Gold	Caroline Burckle; United States
Silver	Patricia Castañeda; Mexico
Bronze	Savannah King; Canada

== Results ==
Rank	Swimmer	Final	
Rank	Swimmer	Time	Heat
1	Caroline Burckle (USA)	8:35.10	3
2	Patricia Castañeda (MEX)	8:38.92	2
3	Savannah King (CAN)	8:39.36	3
4	Susana Escobar (MEX)	8:39.41	3
5	Chanelle Charron-Watson (CAN)	8:44.66	3
6	Kristel Köbrich (CHI)	8:45.99	3
7	Andreina Pinto (VEN)	8:46.67	2
8	Laurabeth Guenthner (USA)	8:48.92	3
9	Golda Marcus (ESA)	8:57.17	2
10	Nayara Ribeiro (BRA)	9:09.11	3
11	Camila Carrillo (CUB)	9:20.03	2
12	María Alejandra Torres (PER)	9:25.80	2
13	Fiorella Gómez (PER)	9:31.79	2
14	Jenna Chaplin (BAH)	9:33.25	1
15	Valerie Eman (ARU)	9:39.58	1
16	Samantha Rahael (TRI)	9:49.44	1
