= Christian Sprenger =

Christian Sprenger may refer to:

- Christian Sprenger (swimmer) (born 1985), Australian swimmer
- Christian Sprenger (handballer) (born 1983), German handball player
- Christian Sprenger (cinematographer), American cinematographer and television producer
