= Lacey Nymeyer =

American swimmer

Lacey Nymeyer OLY
Personal information
- Full name: Lacey Pearl Nymeyer
- Nicknames: "Lace," "Pearl"
- National team: United States
- Born: October 29, 1985 (age 40) Tucson, Arizona, U.S.
- Height: 5 ft 8 in (173 cm)
- Weight: 146 lb (66 kg)

Sport
- Sport: Swimming
- Strokes: Freestyle
- Club: Tucson Ford Dealers Aquatics
- College team: University of Arizona Wildcats
Medal record
Women's swimming
Representing the United States
Olympic Games
| Silver medal – second place | 2008 Beijing | 4×100 m freestyle |
World Championships (LC)
| Gold medal – first place | 2007 Melbourne | 4×200 m freestyle |
| Silver medal – second place | 2005 Montreal | 4×100 m medley |
| Silver medal – second place | 2007 Melbourne | 4×100 m freestyle |
| Silver medal – second place | 2007 Melbourne | 4×100 m medley |
| Silver medal – second place | 2009 Rome | 4×200 m freestyle |
| Bronze medal – third place | 2005 Montreal | 4×100 m freestyle |
Pan Pacific Championships
| Gold medal – first place | 2006 Victoria | 4×100 m freestyle |
| Gold medal – first place | 2006 Victoria | 4×200 m freestyle |

Lacey Pearl Nymeyer (born October 29, 1985) is an American former competition swimmer, Olympic medalist, and former world record-holder.

== Personal ==
Nymeyer is a Tucson native who graduated in 2004 from Mountain View High School. She is also a graduate of the University of Arizona where she majored in physical education. Away from her own training, Nymeyer leads swim clinics and speaks to youth groups. She is also a substitute teacher and plans to teach full-time when her swimming career ends. Nymeyer's mother, Stacey Nymeyer, blogged about her daughter's experiences in Beijing for Arizona's KVOA, News 4.

A member of the Church of Jesus Christ of Latter-day Saints, Nymeyer's career has been watched closely by members of her faith. Nymeyer married Chandler John (owner of Rincon Windows and doors), a former basketball player for Eastern Arizona College, on April 29, 2010, at the Mesa Arizona Temple.

== Swimming career ==
=== Collegiate career ===
Nymeyer attended the University of Arizona, where she competed for the Arizona Wildcats swimming and diving team. During Nymeyer's senior year, the Wildcats won the 2008 NCAA Women's Swimming and Diving Championship. Nymeyer was a member of the 200-yard freestyle relay, 400-yard freestyle relay, 400-yard medley relay, and 800-yard freestyle relay, which all won first place. Additionally, Nymeyer is an individual NCAA champion in the 200y freestyle (2007) and 100-yard freestyle (2008).

Nymeyer was named the "2009 Woman of the Year" for the Pac-10 Conference and represented the conference in the national competition. On October 18, 2009, Nymeyer was named the "2009 NCAA Woman of the Year" which honors female student-athletes who have completed their eligibility, demonstrated academic and athletics excellence, and engaged in community service and leadership opportunities.

=== International career ===
At the 2007 World Aquatics Championships, Nymeyer was a member of the world record-breaking 4×200-meter freestyle relay.

At the 2008 Olympic Games in Beijing, Nymeyer was part of the 4×100-meter freestyle team that won the silver medal. Nymeyer also competed in an individual event, the 100 m freestyle, and placed 12th overall.

At the 2009 World Championships in Rome, Nymeyer was a member of the 4×200-meter freestyle relay that finished second to China.

== See also ==
- List of Olympic medalists in swimming (women)
- List of University of Arizona people
- List of World Aquatics Championships medalists in swimming (women)
- World record progression 4 × 200 metres freestyle relay
