= Caroline Burckle =

American swimmer (born 1986)

Personal information
- Full name: Caroline Stilwell Burckle
- National team: United States
- Born: June 24, 1986 (age 40) Louisville, Kentucky, U.S.
- Height: 5 ft 9 in (175 cm)
- Weight: 137 lb (62 kg)

Sport
- Sport: Swimming
- Strokes: Freestyle
- Club: FAST Swim Team
- College team: University of Florida
Medal record
Women's swimming
Representing the United States
Olympic Games
Bronze medal – third place	2008 Beijing	4×200 m freestyle
World Championships (LC)
Gold medal – first place	2005 Montreal	4×200 m freestyle
Pan American Games
Gold medal – first place	2007 Rio	800 m freestyle

Caroline Stilwell Axel Burckle (born June 24, 1986) is an American former competition swimmer and Olympic bronze medalist.

== Early years ==
Burckle was born in Louisville, Kentucky. She attended Sacred Heart Academy in Louisville, and graduated in 2004.

== College career ==
Burckle accepted an athletic scholarship to attend the University of Florida in Gainesville, Florida, where she swam for coach Gregg Troy's Florida Gators swimming and diving team in National Collegiate Athletic Association (NCAA) and Southeastern Conference (SEC) competition from 2005 to 2008. She won two NCAA individual championships in the 200- and 500-yard freestyle event in 2008, and was named the 2008 NCAA Female Swimmer of the Year by virtue of winning two NCAA national championships and breaking the oldest-standing women's NCAA swimming record by swimming a 4:33.60 in the 500-yard freestyle.

She also won SEC individual championships in the 200-yard freestyle (2005), the 500-yard freestyle (2005, 2008), the 100-yard breaststroke (2007), and the 200-yard breaststroke (2008), and three more SEC titles as a member of the Gators' winning relay teams in the 4x100-yard medley relay (2005), the 4x200-yard freestyle relay (2005), and the 4x50-yard medley relay (2008). During her four-year college career, she received twenty-three All-American honors. She was the 2007–08 recipient of the Honda Sports Award for Swimming and Diving, recognizing her as the outstanding college female swimmer. She graduated from the University of Florida with a bachelor's degree in sociology in 2009.

Burckle's younger brother Clark also swam for Florida, but transferred to the University of Arizona before his senior year, and was an individual NCAA champion in the 200-yard breaststroke in 2010.

== International career ==
In 2005, Burckle was selected to compete at the World Championships in Montreal. She swam in the preliminaries of the 4×200-meter freestyle relay for the gold medal-winning U.S. team. At the 2007 Pan American Games in Rio de Janeiro, Burckle won the gold medal in the 800-meter freestyle.

At the 2008 U.S. Olympic Team Trials in Omaha, Nebraska, Burckle placed fourth in the 200-meter freestyle, earning a place on the Olympic swim team for the 4×200-meter freestyle relay. Burckle also placed fourth in the 400-meter freestyle and fifth in the 800-meter freestyle in Omaha.

At the 2008 Olympic Games, Burckle earned a bronze medal swimming in the 4×200-meter freestyle relay. Burckle swam the lead-off leg in the preliminary heats in 1:57.86, and was selected to swim in the final. She swam the third leg of the final in 1:56.70.

At the 2009 National Championships, Burckle placed third in the 400-meter freestyle, barely missing the chance to compete at the 2009 World Championships. Burckle was, however, named to the 2009–2010 U.S. National Team.

In the fall of 2009, Burckle moved to Fullerton, California to train with the FAST Swim Team under coach Sean Hutchison. She retired from competition swimming in 2010.

== Personal bests ==
Long Course
Stroke	Distance	Time	Date
Freestyle	200 m	1:57.86	Aug 2008
Freestyle	400 m	4:05.09	June 2008
Freestyle	800 m	8:32.26	June 2008

== Life after competition swimming ==
After her move to Southern California in 2009, Burckle enrolled at the Fashion Institute of Design & Merchandising. She completed a degree in merchandise product development in 2010. In 2011, Burckle briefly relocated to San Diego to work for Montiel USA, a start-up women's "active wear" line.

In late 2011, Burckle returned to Louisville to begin Stilwellness, a health and wellness coaching business. Burckle is a member of the International Coaching Federation and Ohio Valley Professional Coaching Alliance, and is pursuing a degree from Wellcoaches School.

== See also ==
- Florida Gators
- List of Olympic medalists in swimming (women)
- List of University of Florida alumni
- List of University of Florida Olympians
