= Christine Marshall =

American swimmer

Personal information
- Full name: Christine Irene Marshall
- National team: United States
- Born: August 11, 1986 (age 39) Newport News, Virginia, U.S.
- Height: 5 ft 5 in (165 cm)
- Weight: 146 lb (66 kg)

Sport
- Sport: Swimming
- Events: 100 Freestyle; Freestyle relays
- Strokes: Freestyle; Butterfly
- Club: Coast Guard Blue Dolphins; Auburn Aquatics; Aggie Swim Club
- College team: Texas A&M University
- Coach: Steve Bultman (A&M)
Medal record
Women's swimming
Representing the United States
Olympic Games
Bronze medal – third place	2008 Beijing	4×200 m freestyle

Christine Irene Marshall (born August 11, 1986) is an American competition swimmer who was an Olympic bronze medalist in the 2008 Beijing Olympics. She attended Texas A&M University, and competed for the Texas A&M Aggies swimming and diving team from 2005 to 2009.

== High school swimming ==
Marshall was born August 11, 1986 in Newport News, Virginia. She started swimming at age 5, when her father Bob began taking her to meets, and began year-round training by age 9. By her High School Freshman year, she attended and swam for Menchville High School under coaches Tom Whanger and Jeff Scott, graduating around 2005. She credited much of her swimming progress with the training she received under Head Coach Steve Hennessy at the Coast Guard Blue Dolphin swim team, an outstanding age-group program in Newport News. Hennessy, an All American swimmer in High School and for the two years he swam for New York's St. John's University, was a 100-meter freestyle specialist like Marshall, who qualified for the 1972 Olympic trials. He continued to train and compete in Military meets during his 28-year Air Force career.

As a High School freshman distinguishing herself in her signature stroke event, she set a District record of 57.74 in the 100-yard butterfly. Soon recognized as a top competitor in the state, in 2004 she won the 100-yard freestyle at the Virginia State Championship. From 2003-2005, she was a regional champion in both the 100-yard butterfly and 100-yard freestyle events. As a High School sophomore, she received first team All-Star honors from the local Newport News's Daily Press, in the 200 medley relay, the 400 freestyle relay, and the 200 freestyle with a meet record time of 1:56.11, and made second team honors in the 50 freestyle.

== Texas A&M ==
Marshall attended Texas A&M from 2005-2009, competing and training all four years under Hall of Fame Women's coach Steve Bultman. Despite suffering a right shoulder injury in her sophomore year, she had the fourth most All-America honors of any Aggie swimmer, collecting a total of 19 over her swimming tenure, and captured thirteen Big 12 titles as well. Most notably, in 2007, Marshall helped lead A&M to their first team championship in the Big 12 conference. She had an A&M top ten ranking in six separate swimming events. During her swimming tenure at A&M, she established school records in the 200 Butterfly and 200 Individual Medley and helped establish new A&M records in the 200, 400 and 800 freestyle relays as well as the 400 medley relay.

== 2008 Beijing Olympics ==
After completing her Junior year at A&M, at the July, 2008 Olympic trials in Omaha, Nebraska, Marshall placed sixth in the 200-meter freestyle with a 1:58.16 to take the last spot on the Women's 4x200 freestyle relay team. Her A&M coach Steve Bultman would be present at the 2008 Olympics, as a coach for the Estonian National team. She also swam in the 100-meter freestyle in the trials, but did not qualify in the highly competitive event, having been seeded 36th. Other A&M Women's swimmers who made the team included Canadian Julia Wilkinson, Estonian butterfly and freestyler Triin Aljand, and Jamaican breaststroker Alia Atkinson.

Marshall represented the United States at the 2008 Summer Olympics in Beijing, China. She received a bronze medal by swimming for the third-place U.S. team in the preliminary heats of the women's 4×200-meter freestyle relay, though she did not swim in the event final. She and her preliminary heat teammates set an American record in Heat Two of the preliminary rounds with a time of 7:52.43, placing first with Marshall swimming a 1:58.58 in her 200 metre leg.

Her efforts allowed the American team to qualify for the finals, where they captured the bronze medal without her participation in a close finish with a time of 7:46.33, placing behind the first place Australian team who swam a combined time of 7:44.31, and the second place Chinese team that swam a combined time of 7:45.93. Jack Bauerle was the women's head U.S. Olympic coach in 2008.

Marshall retired from elite competition in 2011.

== Honors ==
In 2021 Marshall was inducted into the Texas A&M Hall of Fame as the first member of the women's swim team to participate and win a medal in the Olympics.

== See also ==
- List of Olympic medalists in swimming (women)
- List of Texas A&M University people
- List of United States records in swimming
