= Misaki Yamaguchi =

Japanese swimmer (born 1990)

Personal information
- Full name: Misaki Yamaguchi
- National team: Japan
- Born: 20 January 1990 (age 36) Isahaya, Nagasaki, Japan
- Height: 1.65 m (5 ft 5 in)
- Weight: 58 kg (128 lb)

Sport
- Sport: Swimming
- Strokes: Freestyle
Medal record
Women's swimming
Representing Japan
Pan Pacific Championships
Bronze medal – third place	2014 Gold Coast	4×100 m freestyle
Summer Universiade
Silver medal – second place	2009 Belgrade	4×100 m freestyle

Misaki Yamaguchi (山口 美咲, Yamaguchi Misaki; born January 20, 1990) is a Japanese swimmer, who specialized in freestyle events. She represented her nation Japan at the 2008 Summer Olympics, and has won a career total of two medals (one silver and one bronze) in a major international competition, spanning the Summer Universiade and the Pan Pacific Championships. She set a Japanese record of 54.43 in the 100 m freestyle at the 2009 Japan National Sports Festival in Nagaoka, Niigata. Yamaguchi is a student at Kinki University in Fukuoka.

Yamaguchi competed as an eighteen-year-old and a member of the Japanese team in two freestyle relay events at the 2008 Summer Olympics in Beijing. Despite missing out the individual spot in the 200 m freestyle, she managed to place fourth at the Olympic trials in Tokyo (2:01.64) to earn an outright selection on the relay squad. Teaming with Haruka Ueda, Maki Mita, and Emi Takanabe in the 4 × 200 m freestyle relay final, Yamaguchi swam the second leg with a split of 1:58.51, but the Japanese team had to settle for seventh place in 7:57.56. Yamaguchi also participated in the 4 × 100 m freestyle relay, along with Ueda, Mita, and Asami Kitagawa, but missed out the top 8 final by 0.08 of a second in a prelims time of 3:39.25.

In 2009, Yamaguchi earned a silver medal for the Japanese team in the 400 m freestyle relay at the Summer Universiade in Belgrade, Serbia with a final time of 3:42.60.
