= Micha Østergaard =

Danish swimmer (born 1987)

Personal information
- Full name: Micha Kathrine Østergaard
- National team: Denmark
- Born: 31 January 1987 (age 39) Esbjerg, Denmark
- Height: 1.71 m (5 ft 7 in)
- Weight: 59 kg (130 lb)

Sport
- Sport: Swimming
- Strokes: Freestyle, butterfly
- Club: West Swim Esbjerg

Micha Kathrine Østergaard (born 31 January 1987) is a Danish former swimmer who specialized in the 100 and 200 m butterfly.

== Swimming career ==
Micha Østergaard finished eleventh in the 200 m butterfly at the 2008 Summer Olympics, and has held two Danish and Nordic records in each of the butterfly events (50, 100, and 200). Micha still holds the Danish and Nordic record in 200 m butterfly since the 2008 Beijing Olympics.

Micha Østergaard competed for Denmark in 100 & 200 m butterfly and as a member of the nation's 4 × 200 m freestyle relay team at the 2008 Summer Olympics in Beijing. Leading up to the Games, she posted FINA A-standard entry times of 58.87 (100 m butterfly) and 2:08.72 (200 m butterfly) at the Danish Open Championships in Gladsaxe. On the first night of the competition, Østegaard closed out the field to last place and twenty-eighth overall in heat six of the 100 m butterfly by 0.07 of a second behind Slovak swimmer and five-time Olympian Martina Moravcová, dipping under a minute barrier at 59.10. In the 200 m butterfly, Østergaard entered the semifinals with a Danish record and eighth-seeded time of 2:07.77, but missed out of the top 8 final after finishing her semifinal run in eleventh overall at 2:09.29. Østergaard also teamed up with Louise Mai Jansen, Julie Hjorth-Hansen, and Lotte Friis in the 4 × 200 m freestyle relay. Swimming the second leg, Østergaard recorded a split of 2:01.67, and the Danish team finished the prelims in tenth overall with a new national record of 8:00.81.

At the 2009 FINA World Championships in Rome, Italy, Østergaard broke two new Danish records. In the 200 m butterfly, she lowered her record time to 2:07.44 in the semifinals, but matched her position from the Olympics. She also helped her Danish team (Jansen, Hjorth-Hansen, and Friis) to dip under an 8-minute barrier and broke a new record of 7:55.56 in the 4 × 200 m freestyle relay, but finished in twelfth overall from the prelims.

== Civil career ==
In 2013 Micha Østergaard started working as a personal trainer for German celebrities like Barbara Schöneberger and was asked to become an official Nike representative as a Nike Trainer in late 2014.

== Personal life ==
Born in Esbjerg, Denmark, where Østergaard lived until the age of 21. She then moved to the Copenhagen, Denmark, to swim at the Danish National Training Centre (NTC). Following the 2008 Summer Olympics in Beijing, China, Østergaard enrolled at Copenhagen Business School, from where she finished her BA in Intercultural Market Communication.

In August 2010 Micha Østergaard moved to Berlin, Germany. March 2011, Østergaard officially announced her retirement from the Sport of Swimming.

Micha Østergaard still resides in Berlin, Germany.
