= Tan Miao =

Chinese swimmer (born 1987)

Olympic medal record

Women's swimming

Representing China
Silver medal – second place	2008 Beijing	4x200 m freestyle

Tan Miao (born January 6, 1987, in Jinan, Shandong) is a female Chinese swimmer, who won a silver medal for China at the 2008 Summer Olympics.

== Major achievements ==
- 2008 National Champions Tournament - 1st 400m free
