= Lara Davenport =

Australian swimmer, Olympic gold medallist

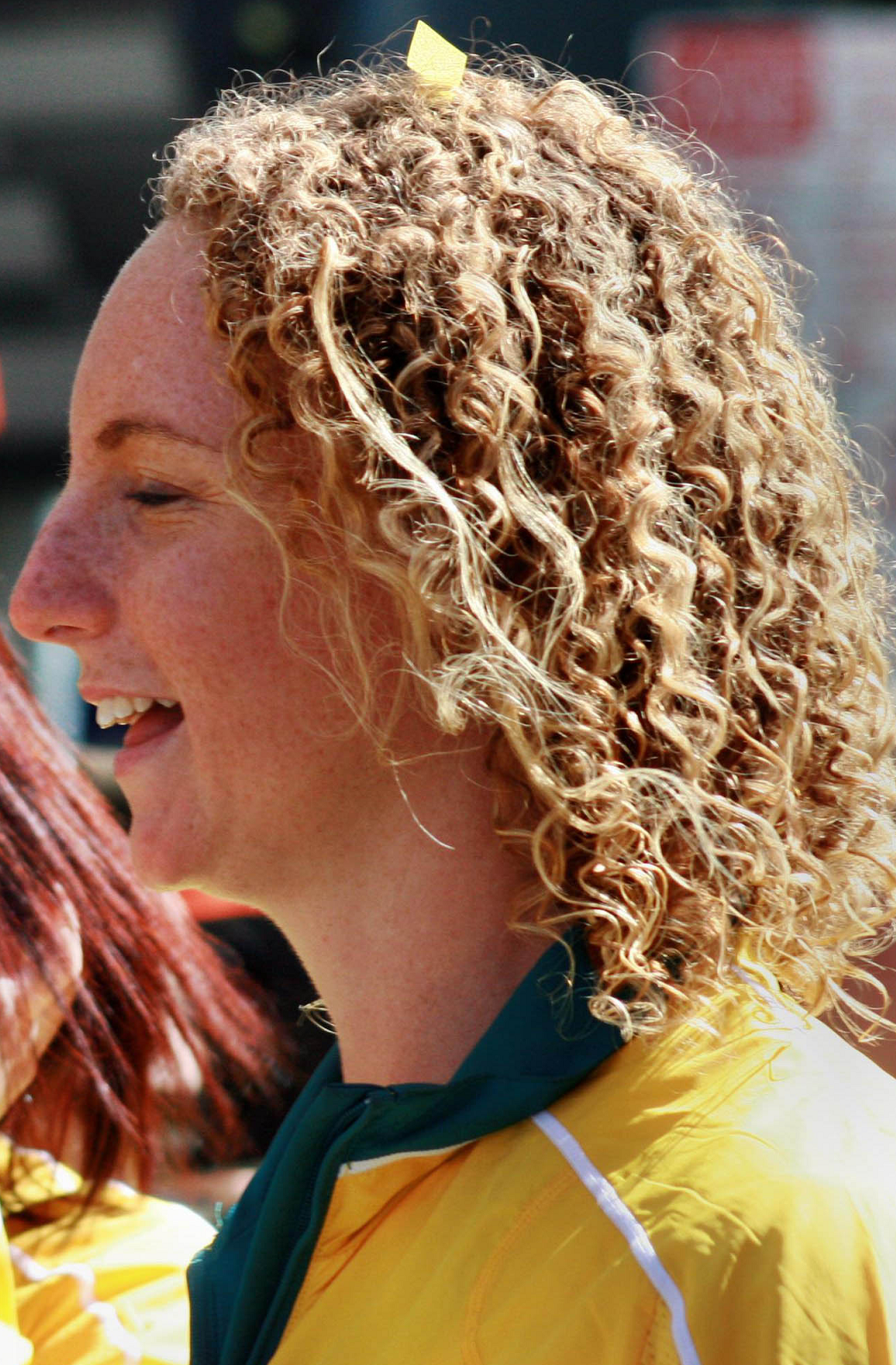

Personal information
- Full name: Lara Shiree Davenport
- Nationality: Australian
- Born: 12 June 1983 (age 43) Sydney
- Height: 1.74 m (5 ft 9 in)
- Weight: 63 kg (139 lb)

Sport
- Sport: Swimming
- Strokes: Freestyle
- Club: Kingscliff SC
Medal record
Women's swimming
Representing Australia
Olympic Games
Gold medal – first place	2008 Beijing	4×200 m freestyle
World Championships (LC)
Silver medal – second place	2005 Montreal	4×200 m freestyle

Lara Shiree Davenport OAM (born 22 December 1983) is an Australian former competitive swimmer, Olympic gold medalist, and sports administrator. Born in Sydney, New South Wales, she later relocated to northern New South Wales to pursue elite swim training and has since been involved in community development, education, and performance consulting.

== Early life and education ==
In 2006, Davenport relocated to Kingscliff in northern New South Wales to train at the High Performance Center at the New South Wales Institute of Sport under coach Greg Salter. During her Olympic campaign, she served as an ambassador for Pacific Hoists. She completed a Bachelor of Social Science (Psychology) at Bond University.

In 2013, Davenport served as the Chair of the Queensland Olympic Council Education Commission and a member of the Victorian Olympic Council Education Commission.

== Career ==
=== Swimming ===
Davenport received a scholarship at the New South Wales Institute of Sport (NSWIS) in 1999. She represented Australia at the 2001 East Asian Games in Osaka, Japan, where she won three gold medals in the 100 & 200 meter butterfly, and the 4×200-meter freestyle relay.

She competed on the Mare Nostrum World Tour (Europe – 2001, 2002, 2003, 2007, 2008) and the FINA short course World Cup Tour in 2003 and 2004, achieving podium finishes in butterfly and freestyle events. At the 2004 Oceania Swimming Championships in Suva, Fiji, Davenport won gold medals in the 200-metre freestyle and 4×200-metre freestyle relay, along with a silver medal in the 200-metre butterfly.

In 2005, she was selected for her first senior world championship team, competing at the World Aquatics Championships in Montreal, Canada, where she won a silver medal as a heat swimmer in the 4×200-metre freestyle relay.

Following a back injury in 2006, Davenport relocated permanently to Kingscliff and specialised in freestyle events. At the 2006 World Short Course Championships in Shanghai, China, she won gold and silver medals as the heat swimmer in the 4×200-meter and 4×100-meter freestyle relays.

At the 2007 World Aquatics Championships in Melbourne, Davenport was selected to swim in the 4x200 metre freestyle relay final alongside Jodie Henry, Stephanie Rice, Lara Davenport and Libby Trickett, after recording the fastest Australian split in the heats. The team finished fourth in the final.

At the 2008 Australian Swimming Championships, she qualified for the 2008 Summer Olympics in Beijing as a member of the 4×200-metre freestyle relay squad. Lara swam the final leg of the heats, contributing to the team's qualification for the final. The Australian relay team went on to win gold in a world-record time, with Davenport recognised as an Olympic gold medallist as a squad member.

Following her competitive career, Davenport served as the head coach at Kingscliff Swimming Club and has been involved in mentoring and Olympic education initiatives.

In 2024, she joined Taylor McKeown and David McKeon on Thursday Island to engage with more than 250 young Torres Strait Islanders in swimming activities during an Australian Olympic Committee community visit.

=== Post-swimming career ===
==== Community development ====
Davenport has been involved in community development initiatives through sport, working extensively in the not-for-profit sector. She has served as Healthy Living Program Coordinator for Red Dust Role Models, a program manager with the Stride Foundation, as the Chair of the Queensland Olympic Council, and an executive member of the Victorian Olympic Councils Education Committees.

She also delivers motivational presentations to corporate organisations, not-for-profit organisations, and schools.

==== Performance enhancement ====
In 2015, Davenport founded a consulting and coaching business focused on performance enhancement, health promotion, leadership, and community development, using evidence-based experiential techniques and programs.

== Honors and awards ==
- New South Wales Institute of Sport scholarship holder since 1999.
- 2WS Sportsperson of the Year 2002.
- Key to the City of Gold Coast- 2008, sporting achievement at the Beijing Olympics
- The Medal of the Order of Australia (MOA) in the 2009 Australian Day Honors for service to sport and community
- Tribunal Member, Olympic Team Selection Appeals Tribunal 2012

== See also ==
- List of Olympic medalists in swimming (women)
