= Renata Spagnolo =

Italian swimmer

Personal information
- National team: Italy
- Born: January 2, 1989 (age 37)

Sport
- Sport: Swimming
Medal record
Representing Italy
European Championships
Bronze medal – third place	2008 Eindhoven	4x200m freestyle relay

Renata Spagnolo (born 2 January 1989) is an Italian swimmer who competed in the 2008 Summer Olympics.
