= Louise Mai Jansen =

Danish swimmer (born 1984)

Personal information
- Full name: Louise Mai Jansen
- National team: Denmark
- Born: 14 April 1984 (age 42) Gladsaxe, Denmark
- Height: 1.75 m (5 ft 9 in)
- Weight: 60 kg (132 lb)

Sport
- Sport: Swimming
- Strokes: Freestyle, medley
- Club: Allerød SK

Louise Mai Jansen (born April 14, 1984) is a Danish former swimmer, who specialized in freestyle and individual medley events. She is an eighteen-time national champion and a Nordic record holder in the freestyle and medley (both 200 m). She is also an eighth-place finalist in the 200 m individual medley at the 2010 European Aquatics Championships in Budapest, Hungary with a time of 2:17.37, just eight seconds off the record set by Julie Hjorth-Hansen in 2009. Jansen is an economics graduate, majoring in mathematics at Copenhagen Business School in Copenhagen.

Jansen made her first Danish team at the 2004 Summer Olympics in Athens. There, she failed to reach the semifinals in any of her individual events, finishing thirty-seventh in the 200 m freestyle, and thirtieth in the 200 m individual medley with respective times of 2:06.06 and 2:27.08.

At the 2008 Summer Olympics in Beijing, Jansen extended her swimming program to two events: 200-metre freestyle and 4×200-metre freestyle relay. She cleared a FINA B-standard entry time of 2:02.20 (200 m freestyle) from the Danish Open in Copenhagen. In the 200 m freestyle, Jansen raced to fourth place and thirty-fourth overall on the same heat as Athens by exactly one second ahead of Singapore's Lynette Lim in 2:01.30. She also teamed up with Hjorth-Hansen, Micha Østergaard, and Lotte Friis in the 4 × 200 m freestyle relay. Swimming the third leg, Jansen recorded a split of 2:00.31, and the Danish team finished the preliminary heats in tenth overall with a Danish record of 8:00.81.

At the 2009 FINA World Championships in Rome, Italy, Jansen helped her Danish team (Hjorth-Hansen, Ostergaard, and Friis) to dip under an eight-minute barrier and broke a new record of 7:55.56 in the 4 × 200 m freestyle relay, but finished only in twelfth place overall from the preliminary heats.
