= Julie Hjorth-Hansen =

Danish swimmer (born 1984)

Personal information
- Full name: Julie Hjorth-Hansen
- National team: Denmark
- Born: 10 June 1984 (age 42) Birkerød, Rudersdal, Denmark
- Height: 1.70 m (5 ft 7 in)
- Weight: 66 kg (146 lb)

Sport
- Sport: Swimming
- Strokes: Freestyle, medley
- Club: Birkerød SK
Medal record
Women's swimming
Representing Denmark
European Championships (SC)
Bronze medal – third place	2004 Vienna	200 m medley

Julie Hjorth-Hansen (born 10 June 1984) is a Danish former swimmer, who specialized in freestyle and individual medley events. She placed among the top 10 swimmers in the 200 m individual medley at the 2008 Summer Olympics, and has won a bronze medal at the 2004 European Short Course Swimming Championships in Vienna, Austria in 2:13.03.

Hjorth-Hansen competed for the Danish swimming squad in the women's 200 m individual medley at the 2008 Summer Olympics in Beijing. Leading up to the Games, she cleared a FINA A-standard entry time of 2:12.74 at the Mare Nostrum Arena International Meet in Canet-en-Roussillon, France. Hjorth-Hansen dipped under the 2:12 barrier in the prelims to secure her spot for the semifinals, checking in with a Danish record and fifth fastest time of 2:11.99. Followed by the next morning's session, Hjorth-Hansen failed to advance to the final, as she finished her semifinal run with a tenth-place overall time in 2:12.26. Hjorth-Hansen also teamed up with Louise Mai Jansen, Micha Østergaard, and Lotte Friis in the 4 × 200 m freestyle relay. Swimming the lead-off leg, Hjorth-Hansen recorded a split of 1:59.16, and the Danish team finished the preliminary heats in tenth overall with a new national record of 8:00.81.

At the 2009 FINA World Championships in Rome, Italy, Hjorth-Hansen broke two new Danish records. In the 200 m individual medley, she placed fifth in the final by 0.18 of a second behind Great Britain's Hannah Miley, breaking the 2:10 barrier and lowering her record to 2:09.73. She also helped her Danish team (Jansen, Ostergaard, and Friis) to dip under an eight-minute barrier and broke a new record of 7:55.56 in the 4 × 200 m freestyle relay, but finished only in twelfth place overall from the preliminary heats.
