= Swimming at the 2008 Summer Olympics – Qualification =

For the swimming competitions at the 2008 Olympics the following qualification systems were in place.

== Pool: Individual Events ==
A National Olympic Committee (NOC) may enter up to 2 qualified athletes in each individual event if both meet the A standard, or 1 athlete per event if they meet the B standard. An NOC may also enter a maximum of 1 qualified relay team per event. NOCs may enter swimmers regardless of time (1 per gender) if they have no swimmers meeting qualifying B standard.

The qualifying time standards were required to be obtained in Continental Championships, National Olympic Trials or International Competitions approved by FINA in the period March 15, 2007 to July 15, 2008.

FINA Qualifying Standards are as follows:

Men's Events			Women's Events		
Event	Men's A	Men's B	Event	Women's A	Women's B
Men's 50 metre freestyle	22.35	23.13	Women's 50 metre freestyle	25.43	26.32
Men's 100 metre freestyle	49.23	50.95	Women's 100 metre freestyle	55.24	57.17
Men's 200 metre freestyle	1:48.72	1:52.53	Women's 200 metre freestyle	1:59.30	2:03.50
Men's 400 metre freestyle	3:49.95	3:58.00	Women's 400 metre freestyle	4:11.26	4:20.05
-	-	-	Women's 800 metre freestyle	8:36.00	8:54.04
Men's 1500 metre freestyle	15:13.16	15:45.12	-	-	-
Men's 100 metre backstroke	55.14	57.07	Women's 100 metre backstroke	1:01.70	1:03.86
Men's 200 metre backstroke	1:59.72	2:03.90	Women's 200 metre backstroke	2:12.73	2:17.40
Men's 100 metre breaststroke	1:01.57	1:03.72	Women's 100 metre breaststroke	1:09.00	1:11.43
Men's 200 metre breaststroke	2:13.70	2:18.37	Women's 200 metre breaststroke	2:28.20	2:33.40
Men's 100 metre butterfly	52.86	54.70	Women's 100 metre butterfly	59.35	1:01.43
Men's 200 metre butterfly	1:57.67	2:01.80	Women's 200 metre butterfly	2:10.84	2:15.42
Men's 200 metre individual medley	2:01.40	2:05.65	Women's 200 metre individual medley	2:15.27	2:20.00
Men's 400 metre individual medley	4:18.40	4:27.45	Women's 400 metre individual medley	4:45.10	4:55.06

== Pool: Relays ==
The 2008 Olympics relay field consisted of 16 teams per event. These spots were allocated to:

- the top 12 finishers at the 2007 World Aquatics Championships;
- the fastest 4 teams not qualified via the 2007 Worlds, based on performances from April 2007-July 2008.

=== Men's 4 × 100 m freestyle relay ===
Competition	Qualifiers (16)			
2007; World Championships (12)	Australia	Brazil	Canada	France
2007; World Championships (12)	Germany	Great Britain	Italy	Japan
2007; World Championships (12)	South Africa	Sweden	Switzerland	United States
World Ranking (4)	China	Netherlands	New Zealand	Russia

=== Men's 4 × 200 m freestyle relay ===
Competition	Qualifiers (16)			
2007; World Championships (12)	Australia	Brazil	Canada	France
2007; World Championships (12)	Germany	Great Britain	Greece	Japan
2007; World Championships (12)	Italy	Poland	Russia	United States
World Ranking (4)	Austria	South Africa	China	Hungary

=== Men's 4 × 100 m medley relay ===
Competition	Qualifiers (16)			
2007; World Championships (12)	Australia	Belarus	Brazil	France
2007; World Championships (12)	Great Britain	Italy	Japan	New Zealand
2007; World Championships (12)	Romania	Russia	South Africa	Ukraine
World Ranking (4)	Canada	Croatia	Sweden	United States

=== Women's 4 × 100 m freestyle relay ===
Competition	Qualifiers (16)			
2007; World Championships (12)	Australia	Belarus	Canada	China
2007; World Championships (12)	France	Germany	Great Britain	Netherlands
2007; World Championships (12)	New Zealand	Sweden	Ukraine	United States
World Ranking (4)	Belgium	Brazil	Finland	Japan

=== Women's 4 × 200 m freestyle relay ===
Competition	Qualifiers (16)			
2007; World Championships (12)	Australia	Canada	China	France
2007; World Championships (12)	Germany	Great Britain	Japan	Netherlands
2007; World Championships (12)	New Zealand	Spain	Sweden	United States
World Ranking (4)	Denmark	Hungary	Italy	Poland

=== Women's 4 × 100 m medley relay ===
Competition	Qualifiers (16)			
2007; World Championships (12)	Australia	Canada	China	France
2007; World Championships (12)	Germany	Great Britain	Italy	Japan
2007; World Championships (12)	Russia	Sweden	Ukraine	United States
World Ranking (4)	Brazil	Netherlands	South Africa	Spain
