= Tang Jingzhi =

Chinese swimmer (born 1986)

Personal information
- Full name: 汤景之
- Nationality: China
- Born: 15 September 1986 (age 39) Hangzhou, Zhejiang

Sport
- Sport: Swimming
- Strokes: Freestyle
Medal record
Women's swimming
Representing China
Olympic Games
Silver medal – second place	2008 Beijing	4x200 m freestyle
World Championships (LC)
Bronze medal – third place	2005 Montreal	4×200 m freestyle
World Championships (SC)
Gold medal – first place	2002 Moscow	4x200 m freestyle

Tang Jingzhi (simplified Chinese: 汤景之; traditional Chinese: 湯景之; pinyin: Tāng Jǐngzhī; born 15 September 1986 in Hangzhou, Zhejiang) is a female Chinese swimmer, who won a silver medal for China at the 2008 Summer Olympics.

== Major achievements ==
- 2001 Goodwill Games - 1st 400m free;
- 2002/2006 World Short-Course Championships - 1st/2nd 4 × 200 m free relay;
- 2002 Asian Games - 1st 4 × 200 m free relay, 3rd 400m free;
- 2005 National Champions Tournament - 1st 400m free;
- 2006 Asian Championships - 1st 200m free

== Records ==
- 2002 Moscow World Short-Course Championships - 7.46.30, 4 × 200 m free relay (WR)
