= Alena Popchanka =

Belarusian swimmer

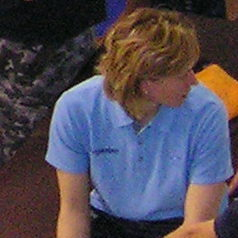
- Popchanka in 2009

Personal information
- Full name: Alena Popchanka
- Nationality: France (2005-on); Belarus (pre-2005)
- Born: 28 July 1979 (age 47) Gomel, Belarus
- Height: 1.76 m (5 ft 9 in)

Sport
- Sport: Swimming
Medal record
Women's swimming
World Championships (LC)
Representing Belarus
Gold medal – first place	2003 Barcelona	200 m freestyle
Representing France
Bronze medal – third place	2007 Melbourne	4 × 200 m freestyle
European Championships (LC)
Representing Belarus
Bronze medal – third place	2002 Berlin	100 m freestyle
Bronze medal – third place	2002 Berlin	200 m freestyle
Representing France
Gold medal – first place	2008 Eindhoven	4 × 200 m freestyle
Bronze medal – third place	2006 Budapest	100 m butterfly
Bronze medal – third place	2006 Budapest	4 × 100 m freestyle
Bronze medal – third place	2006 Budapest	4 × 200 m freestyle
Bronze medal – third place	2006 Budapest	4 × 100 m medley
European Championships (SC)
Representing Belarus
Gold medal – first place	2002 Riesa	100 m freestyle
Gold medal – first place	2002 Riesa	200 m freestyle
Silver medal – second place	2002 Riesa	4 × 50 m freestyle
Bronze medal – third place	2003 Dublin	200 m freestyle
Bronze medal – third place	2003 Dublin	100 m butterfly
Representing France
Gold medal – first place	2006 Helsinki	200 m freestyle
Silver medal – second place	2005 Trieste	100 m butterfly
Silver medal – second place	2006 Helsinki	100 m freestyle
Silver medal – second place	2007 Debrecen	100 m butterfly
Bronze medal – third place	2005 Trieste	100 m freestyle
Bronze medal – third place	2007 Debrecen	4 × 50 m medley

Alena Popchanka (born 28 July 1979 in Gomel, Belarus) is a 4-time Olympic freestyle and butterfly swimmer originally from Belarus. She swam for Belarus at the 1996, 2000 and 2004 Olympics. At the 2008 Olympics she swam for France, after her marriage to Frenchman Frédéric Vergnoux in early 2005.

Popchanka won the 200 m freestyle at the 2003 World Championships and won the 200 m freestyle again at the 2006 Short Course European Championships.

She married Vergnoux, her coach, in early 2005, and became a French citizen a few months following the marriage (June). In November 2005, Popchanka was cleared to swim internationally for France, following a 1-year sit-out from competition which was not waived by the Belarusian federation following her departure and last swim for Belarus at the 2004 Olympics. Because of this timing, Popchanka was unable to swim at the 2005 World Championships to defend her 200 m freestyle title from 2003.

Since November 2005, she has competed for France. Leading up to the 2008 Olympics, the couple lived in Edinburgh, Scotland, where Vergnoux coached from 2004 to 2008. Following the 2008 Olympics, Vergnoux and Popchanka moved back to France, after Vergnoux left his coaching job in Edinburgh for one in Paris.

Vergnoux is notable in his own right: during his time in Edinburgh, he was twice named British Coach of the Year. He also served on the British Olympic Team staff for the 2008 Olympics.
