= Annika Liebs =

German swimmer

Personal information
- Nationality: Germany
- Born: 6 September 1979 (age 46) Karlsruhe, Baden-Württemberg, West Germany

Sport
- Sport: Swimming
- Strokes: Freestyle, backstroke
Medal record
World Championships (LC)
Silver medal – second place	2005 Montreal	4×100 m freestyle
Silver medal – second place	2007 Melbourne	200 m freestyle
Silver medal – second place	2007 Melbourne	4×200 m freestyle
World Championships (SC)
Bronze medal – third place	2006 Shanghai	200 m freestyle
European Championships (LC)
Gold medal – first place	2006 Budapest	4×100 m freestyle
Gold medal – first place	2006 Budapest	4×200 m freestyle
Silver medal – second place	2006 Budapest	200 m freestyle
European Championships (SC)
Bronze medal – third place	2005 Trieste	200 m backstroke
Summer Universiade
Silver medal – second place	2005 İzmir	100 m freestyle
Silver medal – second place	2005 İzmir	200 m freestyle
Bronze medal – third place	2005 İzmir	200 m backstroke

Annika Liebs (6 September 1979), previously Annika Lurz, is an Olympic and former World Record-holding swimmer from Germany. She swam for her homeland at the 2008 Olympics.

In 2005, she was a member of the German team that won the silver medal in the 4×100 m freestyle relay at the World Championships in Montreal; and captured three medals (2 silver, 1 bronze) at the Summer Universiade in İzmir, Turkey.

At the 2006 European Championships in Budapest, she clocked the then fastest-ever split in the 4×200 m freestyle relay (1.55.64), helping the Germany team to break the world record in the event with their 7.50.82. Other members of the relay were: Petra Dallmann, Daniela Samulski, and Britta Steffen. Also in the pool during the 4×200 m freestyle relay was France's Laure Manaudou, who swam the then-second fastest split ever (1.56.23). Also at the 2006 European Championships, Annika also swam on Germany's 4×100 m freestyle relay that also set a new world record (3:35.22).

At the 2007 World Championships, she swam the then second-faster-ever time in the women's 200 m freestyle (1:55.68), in finishing second behind Laure Manaudou's world record winning performance; setting the German record in the process. Also at the 2007 Worlds, she was part of Germany's silver medalist 4×200 m freestyle relay.

One month after the 2006 European Championships finished, Annika married her coach Stefan Lurz. The couple divorced in 2013.

== See also ==
- List of German records in swimming
