= Flavia Zoccari =

Italian swimmer

Personal information
- Born: November 1, 1986 (age 39)

Sport
- Sport: Swimming
Medal record
Representing Italy
Summer Universiade
Bronze medal – third place	2007 Bangkok	4x200m freestyle relay
Mediterranean Games
Gold medal – first place	2009 Pescara	4x100m medley relay

Flavia Zoccari (born 1 November 1986) is an Italian freestyle swimmer who competed in the 2008 Summer Olympics.
