= Meike Freitag =

German swimmer (born 1979)

Personal information
- Nationality: German
- Born: 7 February 1979 (age 47) Frankfurt, West Germany
- Height: 1.86 m (6 ft 1 in)
- Weight: 71 kg (157 lb)

Sport
- Sport: Swimming
- Strokes: Freestyle
- Club: Sport Gemeinschaft Frankfurt am Main
Medal record
Women's swimming
Representing Germany
Olympic Games
Silver medal – second place	1996 Atlanta	4x200 m freestyle
Bronze medal – third place	1996 Atlanta	4x100 m freestyle
Bronze medal – third place	2000 Sydney	4x200 m freestyle
World Championships (LC)
Silver medal – second place	2001 Fukuoka	4×200 m freestyle
Silver medal – second place	2007 Melbourne	4×200 m freestyle
Summer Universiade
Bronze medal – third place	1999 Mallorca	200 m freestyle

Meike Freitag (born 7 February 1979) is a German former swimmer specialised in the freestyle. A three-time Olympian (1996, 2000 and 2008) she won a total number of three medals (one silver and two bronze) as a member (heat swimmer) of the German women's relay teams. She is the daughter of two-time Olympian and butterfly swimmer Werner Freitag.
