= Céline Couderc =

French swimmer (born 1983)

Personal information
- Nationality: France
- Born: 11 March 1983 (age 43) Avignon, Vaucluse, France
- Height: 1.74 m (5 ft 9 in)
- Weight: 62 kg (137 lb)

Sport
- Sport: Swimming
- Strokes: Freestyle
- Club: CNC Ales
Medal record
World Championships (LC)
Bronze medal – third place	2007 Melbourne	4×200 m freestyle
European Championships (LC)
Gold medal – first place	2004 Madrid	4×100 m freestyle
Silver medal – second place	2004 Madrid	4×200 m freestyle
Bronze medal – third place	2006 Budapest	4x100 m freestyle
Bronze medal – third place	2006 Budapest	4x100 m medley
Summer Universiade
Gold medal – first place	2003 Daegu	4×100 m freestyle
Mediterranean Games
Gold medal – first place	2005 Almería	100 m freestyle
Gold medal – first place	2005 Almería	4×100 m freestyle
Gold medal – first place	2005 Almería	4×200 m freestyle
Gold medal – first place	2005 Almería	4×100 m medley
Silver medal – second place	2005 Almería	50 m freestyle

Céline Couderc (born 11 March 1983 in Avignon, Vaucluse) is a female freestyle swimmer from France, who twice competed for her native country at the Summer Olympics: in 2004 and 2008.
