= Swimming at the 2007 World Aquatics Championships – Women's 50 metre backstroke =

The Women's 50m Backstroke at the 2007 World Aquatics Championships took place on 28 March (prelims & semifinals) and the evening of 29 March (finals) at the Rod Laver Arena in Melbourne, Australia. 95 swimmers were entered in the event, of which, 93 swam.

The USA's Natalie Coughlin established a new Championship Record for the distance (28.30) the day prior to the event, with her split from the women's 100m Back final. The record for the distance had been 28.31 by China's Gao Chang from the 2005 Worlds.

Existing records at the start of the event started were:

- World Record (WR): 28.19, Janine Pietsch (Germany), 25 May 2005 in Berlin, Germany.
- Championship Record (CR): 28.30, Natalie Coughlin (USA), Melbourne 2007 (27 March 2007)

== Results ==
=== Finals ===
Place	Name	Nationality	Time	Note
1	Leila Vaziri	USA	28.16	=WR
2	Aleksandra Gerasimenya	Belarus	28.46	
3	Tayliah Zimmer	Australia	28.50	
4	Zhao Jing	China	28.54	
5	Reiko Nakamura	Japan	28.64	
6	Gao Chang	China	28.70	
7	Mai Nakamura	Japan	28.86	
8	Janine Pietsch	Germany	28.87	

=== Semifinals ===
Rank	Swimmer	Nation	Time	Note
1	Leila Vaziri	USA	28.16	Q WR
2	Aleksandra Gerasimenya	Belarus	28.38	Q
3	Reiko Nakamura	Japan	28.58	Q
4	Mai Nakamura	Japan	28.59	Q
5	Janine Pietsch	Germany	28.72	Q
6	Zhao Jing	China	28.74	Q
7	Tayliah Zimmer	Australia	28.78	Q
8	Gao Chang	China	28.81	Q
9	Anastasia Zuyeva	Russia	28.85	
10	Iryna Amshennikova	Ukraine	28.91	
11	Margaret Hoelzer	USA	28.94	
12	Antje Buschschulte	Germany	29.00	
13	Fabíola Molina	Brazil	29.02	
14	Emily Seebohm	Australia	29.04	
15	Hannah McLean	New Zealand	29.22	
16	Elena Gemo	Italy	29.94	

=== Preliminaries ===
Rank	Swimmer	Nation	Time	Note
1	Leila Vaziri	USA	28.25	Q, CR
2	Aleksandra Gerasimenya	Belarus	28.71	Q
3	Laure Manaudou	France	28.84	Q
4	Janine Pietsch	Germany	28.85	Q
4	Reiko Nakamura	Japan	28.85	Q
6	Mai Nakamura	Japan	28.89	Q
7	Margaret Hoelzer	USA	28.93	Q
7	Emily Seebohm	Australia	28.93	Q
9	ZHOA Jing	China	29.00	Q
9	Tayliah Zimmer	Australia	29.00	Q
11	Iryna Amshennikova	Ukraine	29.01	Q
12	GAO Chang	China	29.02	Q
13	Fabíola Molina	Brazil	29.04	Q
14	Anastasia Zuyeva	Russia	29.05	Q
15	Hannah McLean	New Zealand	29.14	Q
16	Antje Buschschulte	Germany	29.22	Q
17	Elena Gemo	Italy	29.25	
18	Kateryna Zubkova	Ukraine	29.37	
19	Louise Ørnstedt	Denmark	29.38	
20	Hiu Wai Sherry Tsai	Hong Kong	29.39	
21	Nikolett Szepesi	Hungary	29.46	
21	Mercedes Peris	Spain	29.46	
23	Sanja Jovanović	Croatia	29.52	
24	Fabienne Nadarajah	Austria	29.54	
25	Hinkelien Schreuder	Netherlands	29.61	
26	TAO Li	Singapore	29.63	
27	Karin Prinsloo	South Africa	29.66	
28	Liz Coster	New Zealand	29.73	
29	Kelly Stefanyshyn	Canada	29.77	
30	Anna Gostomelsky	Israel	29.84	
31	Esther Baron	France	29.88	
32	Tine Bossuyt	Belgium	30.00	
33	Evelyn Verrasztó	Hungary	30.03	
34	Triin Aljand	Estonia	30.04	
35	Nam Eun Lee	South Korea	30.19	
36	Iwona Lefanowicz	Poland	30.33	
37	Jorina Aerents	Belgium	30.38	
38	Yoo Jin Jung	South Korea	30.39	
39	Therese Svendsen	Sweden	30.44	
40	Chanelle Van Wyk	South Africa	30.52	
41	Lynette Ng	Singapore	30.53	
42	Kiera Aitken	Bermuda	30.61	
43	Carolina Colorado Henao	Colombia	30.67	
44	Carin Moller	Sweden	30.73	
45	Caroline Pickering Puamau	Fiji	31.07	
46	Natalie Ferdinand	Barbados	31.13	
47	Massie Milagros Carrillo	Peru	31.14	
48	Nazli Ege Calisal	Turkey	31.40	
49	Melanie Nocher	Ireland	31.52	
50	Felicia Leksono	Indonesia	31.68	
51	LIN Man Hsu	Chinese Taipei	31.69	
52	Lourdes Villaseñor	Mexico	31.94	
53	Wenika Kaewchaiwong	Thailand	32.08	
54	Khadija Ciss	Senegal	32.14	
55	Layla Alghul	Jordan	32.18	
56	Cheok Mei Ma	Macau	32.22	
56	Obia Inyengivyikabo	Nigeria	32.22	
58	Christie Bodden	Panama	32.29	
59	Weng Kuan	Macau	32.35	
60	Hsu Jung He	Chinese Taipei	32.43	
61	Sook Fun Chai	Malaysia	32.46	
62	Kiran Khan	Pakistan	32.61	
63	Jonay Briedenhann	Namibia	32.70	
64	Olga Gnedovskaya	Uzbekistan	32.76	
65	Jessica Teixeira Vieira	Mozambique	32.93	
65	Slavica Pavic	Peru	32.93	
67	Siona Huxley	Saint Lucia	33.10	
68	Thi Cuc Hoang	Vietnam	33.18	
69	Maria Virginia Baez Franco	Paraguay	33.58	
70	Parita Parekh	India	33.75	
71	Lacy Palmer-Martin	Saint Lucia	33.94	
72	Marie Laura Meza Peraza	Costa Rica	33.98	
73	Rachel Fortunato	Gibraltar	34.12	
74	April Chang	Samoa	34.17	
75	Ekaterina Mamatkulova	Uzbekistan	34.30	
76	Talisa Pace	Malta	34.56	
77	Mercedes Milner	Zambia	34.80	
78	Dalia Massiel Torrez Zamora	Nicaragua	34.85	
79	Debra Daniel	(Federated States of Micronesia) FS Micronesia	34.98	
80	Anouchka Diane Etiennette	Mauritius	35.18	
81	Mirjana Stojanova	Macedonia	35.24	
82	Uche Monu	Nigeria	35.33	
83	Judith Meauri	Papua New Guinea	35.39	
84	Maxine Pardo	Gibraltar	35.73	
85	Patricia Wellman	Zambia	36.07	
86	Telmen Batjargal	Mongolia	36.67	
87	Amber Sikosang Yobech	Palau	36.97	
88	Natasha Ratter	Uganda	37.42	
89	Kelly How Tam Fat	Mauritius	37.52	
90	Sainzaya Khurelbaatar	Mongolia	37.80	
91	Sarah Elizabeth Johnson	Northern Mariana Islands	37.86	
92	Teran Matthews	(Saint Vincent and the Grenadines) Saint Vincent and the Grenadines	39.02	
93	Olga Hachatryan	Turkmenistan	39.48	
--	Gloria Koussihouede	Benin	DNS	
--	Anisa Curraj	Albania	DNS	
