= Swimming at the 2007 World Aquatics Championships – Women's 100 metre backstroke =

The Women's 100m Backstroke at the 2007 World Aquatics Championships took place on 26 March (prelims & semifinals) and the evening of 27 March (finals) at the Rod Laver Arena in Melbourne, Australia. 87 swimmers were entered in the event, of which, 86 swam.

Existing records at the start of the event started were:

- World Record (WR): 59.58, Natalie Coughlin (USA), 13 August 2002 in Fort Lauderdale, USA.
- Championship Record (CR): 1:00.00, Natalie Coughlin (USA), Montreal 2005 (30 July 2005)

== Results ==
=== Finals ===
Place	Name	Nationality	Time	Note
1st	Natalie Coughlin	USA	59.44	WR; 50m= 28.30 CR*
2nd	Laure Manaudou	France	59.87	ER
3rd	Reiko Nakamura	Japan	1:00.40	NR
4th	Emily Seebohm	Australia	1:00.52	
5th	Hanae Ito	Japan	1:00.63	
6th	Iryna Amshennikova	Ukraine	1:00.79	
7th	Anastasia Zuyeva	Russia	1:01.38	
8th	Tayliah Zimmer	Australia	1:02.68	

Note: Coughlin's 50m split of 28.30 in the Final, established a new Championship Record for the distance. The existing CR for the distance had been 28.31 by China's Gao Chang from Montreal 2005.

=== Semifinals ===
Rank	Swimmer	Nation	Time	Note
1	Emily Seebohm	Australia	1:00.51	Q, NR
2	Laure Manaudou	France	1:00.55	Q
3	Hanae Ito	Japan	1:00.62	Q
4	Natalie Coughlin	USA	1:00.64	Q
5	Reiko Nakamura	Japan	1:00.71	Q
6	Tayliah Zimmer	Australia	1:01.06	Q
7	Iryna Amshennikova	Ukraine	1:01.21	Q
8	Anastasia Zuyeva	Russia	1:01.23	Q
9	Nikolett Szepesi	Hungary	1:01.29	
10	Leila Vaziri	USA	1:01.39	
11	Sanja Jovanović	Croatia	1:01.59	
12	XU Tianlongzi	China	1:01.70	
13	Antje Buschschulte	Germany	1:01.71	
14	Kirsty Coventry	Zimbabwe	1:01.73	
15	Hannah McLean	New Zealand	1:01.80	
16	Kateryna Zubkova	Ukraine	1:02.04	

=== Preliminaries ===
Rank	Swimmer	Nation	Time	Note
1	Natalie Coughlin	USA	1:00.36	Q
2	Kirsty Coventry	Zimbabwe	1:00.57	Q
3	Reiko Nakamura	Japan	1:00.80	Q
4	Laure Manaudou	France	1:00.92	Q
5	Hanae Ito	Japan	1:01.25	Q
6	Leila Vaziri	USA	1:01.36	Q
7	Tayliah Zimmer	Australia	1:01.38	Q
8	Iryna Amshennikova	Ukraine	1:01.43	Q
9	Emily Seebohm	Australia	1:01.70	Q
10	Nikolett Szepesi	Hungary	1:01.74	Q
11	Anastasia Zuyeva	Russia	1:01.89	Q
12	Antje Buschschulte	Germany	1:01.94	Q
12	Hannah McLean	New Zealand	1:01.94	Q
14	XU Tianlongzi	China	1:02.03	Q
15	Kateryna Zubkova	Ukraine	1:02.05	Q
16	Sanja Jovanović	Croatia	1:02.11	Q
17	Hiu Wai Sherry Tsai	Hong Kong	1:02.41	
18	Fabíola Molina	Brazil	1:02.43	
18	Elena Gemo	Italy	1:02.43	
20	Louise Ørnstedt	Denmark	1:02.49	
21	Janine Pietsch	Germany	1:02.72	
22	Alessia Filippi	Italy	1:02.73	
23	Esther Baron	France	1:02.79	
24	Elizabeth Simmonds	Great Britain	1:02.87	
25	ZHAO Jing	China	1:02.98	
26	Aliaksandra Kavaleva	Belarus	1:03.25	
27	Karin Prinsloo	South Africa	1:03.31	
28	Kelly Stefanyshyn	Canada	1:03.38	
29	Petra Klosova	Czech Republic	1:03.40	
30	Iwona Lefanowicz	Poland	1:03.43	
31	Anna Gostomelsky	Israel	1:03.44	
32	Carin Möller	Sweden	1:03.47	
33	Liz Coster	New Zealand	1:03.58	
34	Mercedes Peris	Spain	1:03.69	
35	Erin Volcán	Venezuela	1:03.85	
36	Yoo Jin Jung	South Korea	1:03.97	
37	Julia Wilkinson	Canada	1:04.02	
38	Therese Svendsen	Sweden	1:04.15	
39	Carolina Colorado Henao	Colombia	1:04.39	
40	Melanie Nocher	Ireland	1:04.44	
41	Escarlata Bernard Gonzalez	Spain	1:04.93	
42	Nam Eun Lee	South Korea	1:05.01	
43	Hikelien Schreuder	Netherlands	1:05.09	
44	Triin Aljand	Estonia	1:05.53	
45	Kiera Aitken	Bermuda	1:05.65	
46	Lynette Ng	Singapore	1:05.84	
47	Lourdes Villaseñor	Mexico	1:06.05	
48	Valentina Georgiana Brat	Romania	1:06.19	
49	Man Hsu Lin	Chinese Taipei	1:06.79	
50	Caroline Pickering	Fiji	1:07.27	
51	Hsu Jung He	Chinese Taipei	1:07.28	
52	Felicia Leksono	Indonesia	1:07.32	
53	Nazli Ege Calisal	Turkey	1:07.43	
54	Sook Fun Chai	Malaysia	1:07.85	
55	Layla Alghul	Jordan	1:08.13	
56	Natalie Ferdinand	Barbados	1:08.74	
57	Ming Xiu Ong	Malaysia	1:08.97	
58	Christie Bodden	Panama	1:09.31	
59	Slavica Pavic	Peru	1:09.32	
60	Wenika Kaewchaiwong	Thailand	1:09.47	
61	Madelein Scerri	Malta	1:09.59	
62	Massie Milagros Carrillo	Peru	1:09.75	
63	Weng Kuan	Macao	1:09.83	
64	Jonay Briedenhann	Namibia	1:10.46	
65	Karen Torrez	Bolivia	1:10.78	
66	Khadija Ciss	Senegal	1:11.15	
67	Thi Cuc Hoang	Vietnam	1:11.28	
68	Yulduz Kuchkarova	Uzbekistan	1:11.47	
69	Obia Inyengiyikabo	Nigeria	1:11.61	
70	Lacy Palmer-Martin	Saint Lucia	1:12.07	
71	Man Wai Fong	Macao	1:12.25	
72	Jessica Teixeira Vieira	Mozambique	1:12.32	
73	Maria Virginia Baez Franco	Paraguay	1:12.46	
74	Rachel Fortunato	Gibraltar	1:12.93	
75	Marie Laura Meza Peraza	Costa Rica	1:13.01	
76	Mirjana Stojanova	Macedonia	1:15.07	
77	Dalia Massiel Torrez Zamora	Nicaragua	1:16.20	
78	Siona Huxley	Saint Lucia	1:16.60	
79	Binta Zahra Diop	Senegal	1:16.96	
80	Anouchka Diane Etiennette	Mauritius	1:17.40	
81	Uche Monu	Nigeria	1:17.93	
82	Maxine Pardo	Gibraltar	1:18.24	
83	Judith Meauri	Papua New Guinea	1:19.64	
84	Sarah Elizabeth Johnson	Northern Mariana Islands	1:19.90	
85	Amber Sikosang Yobech	Palau	1:20.78	
86	Natasha Ratter	Uganda	1:2.54	
--	Aleksandra Gerasimenya	Belarus	DNS	
