= 2008 in swimming =

2008 in swimming documents the highlights of competitive international swimming during 2008.

== Major events ==
=== World ===
- 9–13 April: 2008 FINA World Swimming Championships (25 m) in Manchester, United Kingdom
- 3–8 May: 2008 FINA World Open Water Swimming Championships in Seville, Spain
- 8–13 July: 2008 FINA Youth World Swimming Championships in Monterrey, Mexico
- 9–17 August: Swimming at the 2008 Summer Olympics in Beijing, China
- 20–21 August: 10 km marathon swimming at the 2008 Summer Olympics in Beijing, China
- 7–15 September: Swimming at the 2008 Summer Paralympics in Beijing, China
- 25–26 October: Marathon swimming at the 2008 Asian Beach Games in Bali, Indonesia
- 2008 FINA Swimming World Cup
  - 10–12 October: Belo Horizonte, Brazil
  - 17–18 October: Durban, South Africa
  - 25–26 October: Sydney, Australia
  - 1–2 November: Singapore
  - 8–9 November: Moscow, Russia
  - 11–12 November: Stockholm, Sweden
  - 15–16 November: Berlin, Germany

=== Regional ===
- 30 July – 3 August 2008 European Junior Swimming Championships in Belgrade, Serbia
- 1–7 December: 2008 African Swimming Championships in Johannesburg, South Africa
- 11–14 December: European Short Course Swimming Championships 2008 in Rijeka, Croatia

== World records ==
Current as of 1 January 2009
Officially surpassed later in 2008

=== Men's long course ===
Date	Event	Time		Name	Nation	Meet	Location	Ref
17 February	50 m freestyle	21.56		Eamon Sullivan	Australia	NSW Championships	Sydney, Australia	
21 March	100 m freestyle	47.60	sf	Alain Bernard	France	European Championships	Eindhoven, Netherlands	
22 March	100 m freestyle	47.50		Alain Bernard	France	European Championships	Eindhoven, Netherlands	
23 March	50 m freestyle	21.50	sf	Alain Bernard	France	European Championships	Eindhoven, Netherlands	
27 March	50 m freestyle	21.41	sf	Eamon Sullivan	Australia	Australian Championships	Sydney, Australia	
28 March	50 m freestyle	21.28		Eamon Sullivan	Australia	Australian Championships	Sydney, Australia	
2 April	50 m backstroke	24.47	h, †	Liam Tancock	Great Britain	British Championships	Sheffield, United Kingdom	
8 June	200 m breaststroke	2:07.51		Kosuke Kitajima	Japan	Japan Open	Tokyo, Japan	
29 June	400 m individual medley	4:05.25		Michael Phelps	United States	US Olympic Trials	Omaha, United States	
1 July	100 m backstroke	52.89		Aaron Peirsol	United States	US Olympic Trials	Omaha, United States	
4 July	200 m backstroke	1:54.32	=	Aaron Peirsol	United States	US Olympic Trials	Omaha, United States	
4 July	200 m individual medley	1:54.80		Michael Phelps	United States	US Olympic Trials	Omaha, United States	
10 August	400 m individual medley	4:03.84		Michael Phelps	United States	Olympic Games	Beijing, China	
10 August	4 × 100 m freestyle relay	3:12.23	h	Nathan Adrian (48.82); Cullen Jones (47.61); Ben Wildman-Tobriner (48.03); Matt Grevers (47.77)	United States	Olympic Games	Beijing, China	
11 August	100 m breaststroke	58.91		Kosuke Kitajima	Japan	Olympic Games	Beijing, China	
11 August	100 m freestyle	47.24	r	Eamon Sullivan	Australia	Olympic Games	Beijing, China	
11 August	4 × 100 m freestyle relay	3:08.24		Michael Phelps (47.51); Garrett Weber-Gale (47.02); Cullen Jones (47.65); Jason Lezak (46.06)	United States	Olympic Games	Beijing, China	
12 August	200 m freestyle	1:42.96		Michael Phelps	United States	Olympic Games	Beijing, China	
12 August	100 m backstroke	52.54		Aaron Peirsol	United States	Olympic Games	Beijing, China	
13 August	100 m freestyle	47.20	sf	Alain Bernard	France	Olympic Games	Beijing, China	
13 August	100 m freestyle	47.05	sf	Eamon Sullivan	Australia	Olympic Games	Beijing, China	
13 August	200 m butterfly	1:52.03		Michael Phelps	United States	Olympic Games	Beijing, China	
13 August	4 × 200 m freestyle relay	6:58.56		Michael Phelps (1:43.31); Ryan Lochte (1:44.28); Ricky Berens (1:46.29); Peter Vanderkaay (1:44.68)	United States	Olympic Games	Beijing, China	
15 August	200 m backstroke	1:53.94		Ryan Lochte	United States	Olympic Games	Beijing, China	
15 August	200 m individual medley	1:54.23		Michael Phelps	United States	Olympic Games	Beijing, China	
17 August	4 × 100 m medley relay	3:29.34		Aaron Peirsol (53.16); Brendan Hansen (59.27); Michael Phelps (50.15); Jason Lezak (46.76)	United States	Olympic Games	Beijing, China	
5 December	50 m backstroke	24.33		Randall Bal	United States	Eindhoven Cup	Eindhoven, Netherlands	

Legend: e – equalled existing record;
Records not set in finals: h – heat; sf – semifinal; r – relay 1st leg; rh – relay heat 1st leg; b – B final; † – en route to final mark; so – swim-off; tt – time trial

=== Women's long course ===
Date	Event	Time		Name	Nation	Meet	Location	Ref
16 February	200 m backstroke	2:06.39		Kirsty Coventry	Zimbabwe	US Grand Prix	Columbia, United States	
17 February	100 m backstroke	59.21		Natalie Coughlin	United States	US Grand Prix	Columbia, United States	
7 March	50 m backstroke	28.00	r	Hayley McGregory	United States	Texas Senior Circuit Championships	Austin, United States	
18 March	4 × 100 m freestyle relay	3:33.62		Inge Dekker (53.77); Ranomi Kromowidjojo (53.61); Femke Heemskerk (53.62); Marleen Veldhuis (52.62)	Netherlands	European Championships	Eindhoven, Netherlands	
22 March	400 m individual medley	4:31.46		Stephanie Rice	Australia	Australian Championships	Sydney, Australia	
22 March	50 m backstroke	27.95	sf	Emily Seebohm	Australia	Australian Championships	Sydney, Australia	
23 March	50 m backstroke	27.67		Sophie Edington	Australia	Australian Championships	Sydney, Australia	
24 March	50 m freestyle	24.09		Marleen Veldhuis	Netherlands	European Championships	Eindhoven, Netherlands	
24 March	400 m freestyle	4:01.53		Federica Pellegrini	Italy	European Championships	Eindhoven, Netherlands	
25 March	200 m individual medley	2:08.92		Stephanie Rice	Australia	Australian Championships	Sydney, Australia	
27 March	100 m freestyle	52.88		Libby Trickett	Australia	Australian Championships	Sydney, Australia	
29 March	50 m freestyle	23.97		Libby Trickett	Australia	Australian Championships	Sydney, Australia	
29 June	400 m individual medley	4:31.12		Katie Hoff	United States	US Olympic Trials	Omaha, United States	
30 June	100 m backstroke	59.15	h	Hayley McGregory	United States	US Olympic Trials	Omaha, United States	
30 June	100 m backstroke	59.03	h	Natalie Coughlin	United States	US Olympic Trials	Omaha, United States	
1 July	100 m backstroke	58.97		Natalie Coughlin	United States	US Olympic Trials	Omaha, United States	
5 July	200 m backstroke	2:06.09		Margaret Hoelzer	United States	US Olympic Trials	Omaha, United States	
10 August	400 m individual medley	4:29.45		Stephanie Rice	Australia	Olympic Games	Beijing, China	
11 August	100 m backstroke	58.77	sf	Kirsty Coventry	Zimbabwe	Olympic Games	Beijing, China	
11 August	200 m freestyle	1:55.45	h	Federica Pellegrini	Italy	Olympic Games	Beijing, China	
13 August	200 m freestyle	1:54.82		Federica Pellegrini	Italy	Olympic Games	Beijing, China	
13 August	200 m individual medley	2:08.45		Stephanie Rice	Australia	Olympic Games	Beijing, China	
14 August	200 m butterfly	2:04.18		Liu Zige	China	Olympic Games	Beijing, China	
14 August	4 × 200 m freestyle relay	7:44.31		Stephanie Rice (1:56.60); Bronte Barratt (1:56.58); Kylie Palmer (1:55.22); Linda Mackenzie (1:55.91)	Australia	Olympic Games	Beijing, China	
15 August	200 m breaststroke	2:20.22		Rebecca Soni	United States	Olympic Games	Beijing, China	
16 August	200 m backstroke	2:05.24		Kirsty Coventry	Zimbabwe	Olympic Games	Beijing, China	
16 August	800 m freestyle	8:14.10		Rebecca Adlington	Great Britain	Olympic Games	Beijing, China	
17 August	4 × 100 m medley relay	3:52.69		Emily Seebohm (59.33); Leisel Jones (1:04.58); Jessicah Schipper (56.25); Libby Trickett (52.53)	Australia	Olympic Games	Beijing, China	

Legend: e – equalled existing record;
Records not set in finals: h – heat; sf – semifinal; r – relay 1st leg; rh – relay heat 1st leg; b – B final; † – en route to final mark; so – swim-off; tt – time trial

=== Men's short course ===
Date	Event	Time		Name	Nation	Meet	Location	Ref
9 April	4 × 100 m freestyle relay	3:08.44		Ryan Lochte (47.09); Bryan Lundquist (46.64); Nathan Adrian (46.57); Doug Van Wie (48.14)	United States	World Championships	Manchester, United Kingdom	
11 April	200 m individual medley	1:51.56		Ryan Lochte	United States	World Championships	Manchester, United Kingdom	
11 April	50 m freestyle	20.81		Duje Draganja	Croatia	World Championships	Manchester, United Kingdom	
12 April	100 m individual medley	51.25	sf	Ryan Lochte	United States	World Championships	Manchester, United Kingdom	
13 April	200 m backstroke	1:47.84		Markus Rogan	Austria	World Championships	Manchester, United Kingdom	
13 April	100 m individual medley	51.15		Ryan Lochte	United States	World Championships	Manchester, United Kingdom	
13 April	4 × 100 m medley relay	3:24.29		Stanislav Donets (50.57); Sergey Geybel (57.93); Yevgeny Korotyshkin (49.39); Alexander Sukhorukov (46.40)	Russia	World Championships	Manchester, United Kingdom	
20 July	800 m freestyle	7:23.42		Grant Hackett	Australia	Victorian Championships	Melbourne, Australia	
7 September	50 m freestyle	20.64		Roland Schoeman	South Africa	South African Championships	Germiston, South Africa	
25 October	50 m butterfly	22.50		Matt Jaukovic	Australia	World Cup	Sydney, Australia	
26 October	50 m backstroke	23.24		Robert Hurley	Australia	World Cup	Sydney, Australia	
12 November	100 m backstroke	49.94		Peter Marshall	United States	World Cup	Stockholm, Sweden	
12 November	50 m backstroke	23.05		Peter Marshall	United States	World Cup	Stockholm, Sweden	
8 November	50 m breaststroke	26.08		Cameron van der Burgh	South Africa	World Cup	Moscow, Russia	
9 November	100 m breaststroke	56.88		Cameron van der Burgh	South Africa	World Cup	Moscow, Russia	
11 November	100 m backstroke	49.94		Peter Marshall	United States	World Cup	Stockholm, Sweden	
11 November	50 m breaststroke	25.94		Cameron van der Burgh	South Africa	World Cup	Stockholm, Sweden	
15 November	100 m backstroke	49.63		Peter Marshall	United States	World Cup	Berlin, Germany	
16 November	50 m backstroke	22.87		Randall Bal	United States	World Cup	Berlin, Germany	
16 November	200 m freestyle	1:40.83		Paul Biedermann	Germany	World Cup	Berlin, Germany	
6 December	50 m butterfly	22.29		Amaury Leveaux	France	French Championships	Angers, France	
7 December	100 m freestyle	45.69		Alain Bernard	France	French Championships	Angers, France	
11 December	50 m freestyle	20.48	sf	Amaury Leveaux	France	European Championships	Rijeka, Croatia	
12 December	100 m freestyle	45.12	sf	Amaury Leveaux	France	European Championships	Rijeka, Croatia	
13 December	200 m butterfly	1:50.60		Nikolay Skvortsov	Russia	European Championships	Rijeka, Croatia	
13 December	100 m freestyle	44.94		Amaury Leveaux	France	European Championships	Rijeka, Croatia	
14 December	50 m butterfly	22.18	h	Amaury Leveaux	France	European Championships	Rijeka, Croatia	
14 December	100 m backstroke	49.32		Stanislav Donets	Russia	European Championships	Rijeka, Croatia	
20 December	4 × 100 m freestyle relay	3:04.98		Grégory Mallet (47.41); Fabien Gilot (44.92); William Meynard (47.65); Frédérick Bousquet (45.00)	France	French Club Championships	Istres, France	
21 December	100 m backstroke	49.20	r	Aschwin Wildeboer	Spain	Spanish Championships	Madrid, Spain	

Legend: e – equalled existing record;
Records not set in finals: h – heat; sf – semifinal; r – relay 1st leg; rh – relay heat 1st leg; b – B final; † – en route to final mark; so – swim-off; tt – time trial

=== Women's short course ===
Date	Event	Time	Name	Nation	Meet	Location	Ref
23 February	200 m backstroke	2:03.24	Reiko Nakamura	Japan	Japan Open	Tokyo, Japan	
23 February	200 m butterfly	2:03.12	Yuko Nakanishi	Japan	Japan Open	Tokyo, Japan	
9 April	400 m individual medley	4:26.52	Kirsty Coventry	Zimbabwe	World Championships	Manchester, United Kingdom	
9 April	4 × 200 m freestyle relay	7:38.90	Inge Dekker (1:55.36); Femke Heemskerk (1:53.44); Marleen Veldhuis (1:54.17); Ranomi Kromowidjojo (1:55.93)	Netherlands	World Championships	Manchester, United Kingdom	
10 April	50 m breaststroke	29.58	Jessica Hardy	United States	World Championships	Manchester, United Kingdom	
11 April	50 m butterfly	25.32	Felicity Galvez	Australia	World Championships	Manchester, United Kingdom	
11 April	200 m backstroke	2:00.91	Kirsty Coventry	Zimbabwe	World Championships	Manchester, United Kingdom	
11 April	4 × 100 m medley relay	3:51.36	Margaret Hoelzer (58.79); Jessica Hardy (1:03.98); Rachel Komisarz (55.93); Kara Denby (52.66)	United States	World Championships	Manchester, United Kingdom	
12 April	200 m individual medley	2:06.13	Kirsty Coventry	Zimbabwe	World Championships	Manchester, United Kingdom	
12 April	4 × 100 m freestyle relay	3:29.42	Hinkelien Schreuder (53.62); Femke Heemskerk (52.61); Inge Dekker (51.76); Marleen Veldhuis (51.43)	Netherlands	World Championships	Manchester, United Kingdom	
13 April	50 m backstroke	26.37	Sanja Jovanović	Croatia	World Championships	Manchester, United Kingdom	
13 April	50 m freestyle	23.25	Marleen Veldhuis	Netherlands	World Championships	Manchester, United Kingdom	
13 April	100 m butterfly	55.89	Felicity Galvez	Australia	World Championships	Manchester, United Kingdom	
26 April	100 m butterfly	55.74	Libby Trickett	Australia	Swimming Australia Grand Prix	Canberra, Australia	
26 April	100 m breaststroke	1:03.72	Leisel Jones	Australia	Swimming Australia Grand Prix	Canberra, Australia	
12 November	50 m butterfly	25.31	Therese Alshammar	Sweden	World Cup	Stockholm, Sweden	
15 November	50 m butterfly	24.99	Marieke Guehrer	Australia	World Cup	Berlin, Germany	
28 November	400 m individual medley	4:25.87	Julia Smit	United States	Canada Cup	Toronto, Canada	
6 December	200 m freestyle	1:53.18	Coralie Balmy	France	French Championships	Angers, France	
12 December	800 m freestyle	8:04.53	Alessia Filippi	Italy	European Championships	Rijeka, Croatia	
13 December	50 m backstroke	26.23	Sanja Jovanović	Croatia	European Championships	Rijeka, Croatia	
14 December	200 m freestyle	1:51.85	Federica Pellegrini	Italy	European Championships	Rijeka, Croatia	
14 December	400 m individual medley	4:25.06	Mireia Belmonte	Spain	European Championships	Rijeka, Croatia	
19 December	4 × 100 m freestyle relay	3:28.22	Hinkelien Schreuder (52.88); Inge Dekker (52.24); Ranomi Kromowidjojo (52.12); Marleen Veldhuis (50.98)	Netherlands	Dutch Championships	Amsterdam, Netherlands	

Legend: e – equalled existing record;
Records not set in finals: h – heat; sf – semifinal; r – relay 1st leg; rh – relay heat 1st leg; b – B final; † – en route to final mark; so – swim-off; tt – time trial

== Other events ==
=== National championships ===
Long course

Dates	Event	City
22–29 March	(Australia) Australian Championships	Sydney
31 March – 6 April	(United Kingdom) British Championships	Sheffield

Short course

Dates	Event	City
27–30 November	(Sweden) Swedish SC Championships	Stockholm
