= Swimming at the 2007 World Aquatics Championships =

The swimming competition at the 12th FINA World Aquatics Championships was held in Rod Laver Arena in Melbourne, Australia, from 25 March to 1 April 2007. This portion of the 2007 Worlds featured 40 events (20 for males, 20 for females), all swum in a long course (50 m) pool:

- freestyle: 50 m, 100 m, 200 m, 400 m, 800 m and 1500 m;
- backstroke: 50 m, 100 m and 200 m;
- breaststroke: 50 m, 100 m and 200 m;
- butterfly: 50 m, 100 m and 200 m;
- individual medley (I.M.): 200 m and 400 m; and
- relays: 4 × 100 m free, 4 × 200 m free, and 4 × 100 m medley.

== Further explanations ==
The 2007 World Championships served in qualifying for the Swimming portion at the 2008 Olympics in two ways:

1. It was the main relay qualifier, with the top-12 finishers in each relay automatically qualifying for the 16-entry field at the 2008 Olympics (the other 4 teams were filled with the 4 fastest remaining nations).
2. Those nations who did not have swimmers who meet the Olympic qualifying times, and wanted a "wildcard" entry into the Olympics, need to have their potential swimmers swim at the 2007 Worlds.

== Participating nations ==
166 nations had 1,142 swimmers entered at the 2007 Worlds:

- Albania (7)
- Algeria (4)
- American Samoa (4)
- Andorra (1)
- Angola (4)
- Antigua and Barbuda (2)
- Argentina (3)
- Armenia (3)
- Aruba (3)
- Australia (36)
- Austria (11)
- Azerbaijan (2)
- Bahamas (1)
- Bahrain (4)
- Bangladesh (3)
- Barbados (5)
- Belarus (7)
- Belgium (10)
- Benin (4)
- Bermuda (2)
- Bolivia (8)
- Bosnia and Herzegovina (4)
- Brazil (14)
- Bulgaria (2)
- Burkina Faso (4)
- Burundi (4)
- Cambodia (4)
- Canada (14)
- Chile (6)
- China (41)
- Chinese Taipei (8)
- Colombia (4)
- Republic of the Congo (4)
- Cook Islands (2)
- Costa Rica (4)
- Ivory Coast (1)
- Croatia (12)
- Cuba (2)
- Cyprus (4)
- Czech Republic (8)
- Denmark (12)
- Dominican Republic (1)
- Ecuador (3)
- El Salvador (4)
- Estonia (7)
- Faroe Islands (4)
- Fiji (4)
- Finland (3)
- France (20)
- Germany (28)
- Georgia (2)
- Ghana (2)
- Gibraltar (6)
- Great Britain (28)
- Greece (13)
- Grenada (4)
- Guam (6)
- Guatemala (1)
- Guyana (4)
- Hong Kong (6)
- Honduras (6)
- Iceland (3)
- India (14)
- Indonesia (12)
- Iran (5)
- Ireland (2)
- Israel (9)
- Italy (25)
- Jamaica (1)
- Japan (31)
- Jordan (7)
- Kazakhstan (8)
- Kenya (6)
- Kuwait (1)
- Kyrgyzstan (6)
- Latvia (4)
- Lebanon (4)
- Lesotho (3)
- Libya (3)
- Lithuania (9)
- Luxembourg (1)
- Macau (12)
- Macedonia (6)
- Madagascar (4)
- Malaysia (9)
- Maldives (3)
- Malta (5)
- Marshall Islands (5)
- Mauritania (4)
- Mauritius (1)
- Mexico (5)
- Federated States of Micronesia (4)
- Moldova (5)
- Mongolia (8)
- Montenegro (2)
- Morocco (4)
- Mozambique (6)
- Myanmar (1)
- Namibia (2)
- Nepal (4)
- Netherlands (10)
- Netherlands Antilles (2)
- New Zealand (16)
- Nicaragua (3)
- Niger (3)
- Nigeria (15)
- Northern Mariana Islands (3)
- Norway (5)
- Palau (3)
- Pakistan (4)
- Palestine (5)
- Panama (4)
- Papua New Guinea (4)
- Paraguay (5)
- Peru (12)
- Philippines (5)
- Poland (17)
- Portugal (12)
- Puerto Rico (1)
- Qatar (4)
- Romania (10)
- Russia (27)
- Saint Lucia (5)
- Saint Vincent and the Grenadines (2)
- Samoa (3)
- San Marino (2)
- Saudi Arabia (4)
- Senegal (4)
- Serbia (3)
- Seychelles (7)
- Sierra Leone (1)
- Singapore (25)
- Slovakia (3)
- Slovenia (8)
- South Africa (25)
- South Korea (13)
- Spain (11)
- Sri Lanka (3)
- Sudan (3)
- Suriname (2)
- Swaziland (5)
- Sweden (18)
- Switzerland (8)
- Syria (4)
- Tahiti (2)
- Tajikistan (2)
- Tanzania (3)
- Thailand (8)
- Togo (1)
- Trinidad and Tobago (2)
- Tunisia (5)
- Turkey (6)
- Turkmenistan (5)
- Uganda (4)
- Ukraine (18)
- Uruguay (3)
- United Arab Emirates (4)
- United States (33)
- Uzbekistan (21)
- Venezuela (13)
- Vietnam (4)
- Virgin Islands (4)
- Yemen (2)
- Zambia (6)
- Zimbabwe (3)

== Event schedule ==
Morning/heats sessions began at 10:00 a.m., with the evening sessions (semifinals and finals) beginning at 7:00 p.m. All events were contested in a long-course (50 m) pool. In the 50 m, 100 m, and 200 m events, heats/semifinals/finals were held; with heats in the morning of the first day of the event, semifinals that evening, and finals the next evening. For races 400 m, 800 m, or 1500 m in length, only heats and finals were held. For the 400 m events (both individual and relay), heats and finals were held on the same day. For the individual 800 m and 1500 m free events, heats were held in the morning with finals in the next day's evening session (approximately 36 hours apart). For the 4 × 200 m freestyle relay, heats and finals were the same day (matching the other 2 relays).

date	Morning session Preliminary heats (10:00 a.m.)	Evening session Finals & semifinals (7:00 p.m.)
Sunday; 25 March 2007	women's 100 fly men's 400 free women's 200 I.M. men's 50 fly women's 400 free men's 100 breast women's 4 × 100 free relay men's 4 × 100 free relay swim-off: men's 50 fly	women's 100 fly (semifinals) men's 400 free (final) women's 200 I.M. (semifinals) men's 50 fly (semifinals) women's 400 free (final) men's 100 breast (semifinals) women's 4 × 100 free relay (final) men's 4 × 100 free relay (final)
Monday; 26 March 2007	women's 100 back men's 200 free women's 100 breast men's 100 back women's 1500 free	men's 100 breast (final) women's 100 fly (final) men's 100 back (semifinals) women's 100 breast (semifinals) men's 50 fly (final) women's 100 back (semifinals) men's 200 free (semifinals) women's 200 I.M. (final)
Tuesday; 27 March 2007	men's 50 breast men's 200 fly women's 200 free men's 800 free	men's 200 free (final) women's 100 back (final) men's 50 breast (semifinals) women's 1500 free (final) men's 100 back (final) women's 200 free (semifinals) men's 200 fly (semifinals) women's 100 breast (final)
Wednesday; 28 March 2007	women's 50 back men's 100 free women's 200 fly men's 200 I.M.	men's 100 free (semifinals) women's 50 back (semifinals) men's 200 fly (final) women's 200 free (final) men's 50 breast (final) women's 200 fly (semifinals) men's 200 I.M. (semifinals) men's 800 free (final)
Thursday; 29 March 2007	women's 100 free men's 200 back women's 200 breast men's 200 breast women's 4 × 200 free relay	women's 100 free (semifinals) men's 200 I.M. (final) women's 200 breast (semifinals) men's 100 free (final) women's 200 fly (final) men's 200 breast (semifinals) women's 50 back (final) men's 200 back (semifinals) women's 4 × 200 free relay (final)
Friday; 30 March 2007	women's 50 fly men's 50 free women's 800 free men's 100 fly women's 200 back men's 4 × 200 free relay	women's 100 free (final) men's 200 back (final) women's 50 fly (semifinals) men's 50 free (semifinals) women's 200 breast (final) men's 100 fly (semifinals) women's 200 back (semifinals) men's 200 breast (final) men's 4 × 200 free relay (final) swim-off: men's 50 free swim-off: men's 100 fly
Saturday; 31 March 2007	women's 50 free men's 50 back women's 50 breast men's 1500 free women's 4 × 100 medley relay	women's 50 fly (final) men's 50 free (final) women's 200 back (final) women's 50 breast (semifinals) men's 100 fly (final) women's 50 free (semifinals) men's 50 back (semifinal) women's 800 free (final) women's 4 × 100 medley relay (final)
Sunday; 1 April 2007	men's 400 I.M. women's 400 I.M. men's 4 × 100 medley relay	men's 50 back (final) women's 50 breast (final) men's 400 I.M. (final) women's 50 free (final) men's 1500 free (final) women's 400 I.M. (final) men's 4 × 100 medley relay (final)

== Results ==
Key

- WR - World Record
- CR - Championship Record

=== Men's events ===
Event	Gold		Silver		Bronze	
50 m freestyle details	Ben Wildman-Tobriner; USA	21.88	Cullen Jones; USA	21.94	Stefan Nystrand; Sweden	21.97; NR
100 m freestyle details	Filippo Magnini; Italy; Brent Hayden; Canada	48.43 48.43; NR			Eamon Sullivan; Australia	48.47
200 m freestyle details	Michael Phelps; USA	1:43.86; WR	Pieter van den Hoogenband; Netherlands	1:46.28	Park Tae-Hwan; South Korea	1:46.73; AS
400 m freestyle details	Park Tae-Hwan; South Korea	3:44.30; AS	Grant Hackett; Australia	3:45.43	Yury Prilukov; Russia	3:45:47
800 m freestyle details	Przemysław Stańczyk; Poland	7:47.91; NR	Craig Stevens; Australia	7:48.67	Federico Colbertaldo; Italy	7:49.98; NR
1500 m freestyle details	Mateusz Sawrymowicz; Poland	14:45.94; ER	Yury Prilukov; Russia	14:47.29; NR	David Davies; Great Britain	14:51.21
50 m backstroke details	Gerhard Zandberg; South Africa	24.98; AF	Thomas Rupprath; Germany	25.20	Liam Tancock; Great Britain	25.23
100 m backstroke details	Aaron Peirsol; USA	52.98; WR	Ryan Lochte; USA	53.50	Liam Tancock; Great Britain	53.61; NR
200 m backstroke details	Ryan Lochte; USA	1:54.32; WR	Aaron Peirsol; USA	1:54.80	Markus Rogan; Austria	1:56.02; NR
50 m breaststroke details	Oleg Lisogor; Ukraine	27.66	Brendan Hansen; USA	27.69	Cameron van der Burgh; South Africa	27.88
100 m breaststroke details	Brendan Hansen; USA	59.80	Kosuke Kitajima; Japan	59.96	Brenton Rickard; Australia	1:00.58
200 m breaststroke details	Kosuke Kitajima; Japan	2:09.80	Brenton Rickard; Australia	2:10.99	Loris Facci; Italy	2:11.03
50 m butterfly details	Roland Schoeman; South Africa	23.18	Ian Crocker; USA	23.47	Jakob Andkjær; Denmark	23.56; NR
100 m butterfly details	Michael Phelps; USA	50.77	Ian Crocker; USA	50.82	Albert Subirats; Venezuela	51.82
200 m butterfly details	Michael Phelps; USA	1:52.09; WR	Wu Peng; China	1:55.13	Nikolay Skvortsov; Russia	1:55.22 =NR
200 m individual medley details	Michael Phelps; USA	1:54.98; WR	Ryan Lochte; USA	1:56.19	László Cseh; Hungary	1:56.92; ER
400 m individual medley details	Michael Phelps; USA	4:06.22; WR	Ryan Lochte; USA	4:09.74	Luca Marin; Italy	4:09.88; NR
4 × 100 m freestyle relay details	USA; Michael Phelps (48.42); Neil Walker (48.31); Cullen Jones (48.67); Jason Lezak (47.32); Garrett Weber-Gale^{[a]} Ben Wildman-Tobriner^{[a]}	3:12.72; CR	Italy; Massimiliano Rosolino (49.35); Alessandro Calvi (49.06); Christian Galenda (48.45); Filippo Magnini (47.18); Lorenzo Vismara^{[a]}	3:14.04; ER	France; Fabien Gilot (49.18); Frédérick Bousquet (48.48); Julien Sicot (48.84); Alain Bernard (48.18); Grégory Mallet^{[a]} Amaury Leveaux^{[a]}	3:14.68; NR
4 × 200 m freestyle relay details	USA; Michael Phelps (1:45.36); Ryan Lochte (1:45.86); Klete Keller (1:46.31); Peter Vanderkaay (1:45.71); Jayme Cramer^{[a]} Dave Walters^{[a]}	7:03.24; WR	Australia; Patrick Murphy (1:48.55); Andrew Mewing (1:47.52); Grant Brits (1:48.21); Kenrick Monk (1:45.77); Nick Ffrost^{[a]}	7:10.05	Canada; Brian Johns (1:48.46); Brent Hayden (1:46.59); Rick Say (1:47.59); Andrew Hurd (1:48.06)	7:10.70
4 × 100 m medley relay details	Australia; Matt Welsh (54.78); Brenton Rickard (59.63); Andrew Lauterstein (52.63); Eamon Sullivan (47.89); Hayden Stoeckel^{[a]} Michael Klim^{[a]} Kenrick Monk^{[a]}	3:34.93	Japan; Tomomi Morita (54.76); Kosuke Kitajima (59.23); Takashi Yamamoto (51.90); Daisuke Hosokawa (49.27); Masafumi Yamaguchi^{[a]}	3:35.16; AS	Russia; Arkady Vyatchanin (54.08); Dmitry Komornikov (1:00.65); Nikolay Skvortsov (52.13); Evgeny Lagunov (48.65); Roman Sloudnov^{[a]} Andrey Kapralov^{[a]}	3:35.51

=== Women's events ===
Event	Gold		Silver		Bronze	
50 m freestyle details	Libby Lenton; Australia	24.53	Therese Alshammar; Sweden	24.62	Marleen Veldhuis; Netherlands	24.70
100 m freestyle details	Libby Lenton; Australia	53.40 =CR, OC	Marleen Veldhuis; Netherlands	53.70; NR	Britta Steffen; Germany	53.74
200 m freestyle details	Laure Manaudou; France	1:55.52; WR	Annika Lurz; Germany	1:55.68; NR	Federica Pellegrini; Italy	1:56.97
400 m freestyle details	Laure Manaudou; France	4:02.61; CR	Otylia Jędrzejczak; Poland	4:04.23; NR	Ai Shibata; Japan	4:05.19; AS
800 m freestyle details	Kate Ziegler; USA	8:18.52; CR	Laure Manaudou; France	8:18.80; NR	Hayley Peirsol; USA	8:26.41
1500 m freestyle details	Kate Ziegler; USA	15:53.05; CR	Flavia Rigamonti; Switzerland	15:55.38; NR	Ai Shibata; Japan	15:58.55; AS
50 m backstroke details	Leila Vaziri; USA	28.16; WR	Aleksandra Gerasimenya; Belarus	28.46	Tayliah Zimmer; Australia	28.50
100 m backstroke details	Natalie Coughlin; USA	59.44; WR	Laure Manaudou; France	59.87; ER	Reiko Nakamura; Japan	1:00.40; NR
200 m backstroke details	Margaret Hoelzer; USA	2:07.16; CR, AM	Kirsty Coventry; Zimbabwe	2:07.54; AF	Reiko Nakamura; Japan	2:08.54; NR
50 m breaststroke details	Jessica Hardy; USA	30.63	Leisel Jones; Australia	30.70	Tara Kirk; USA	31.05
100 m breaststroke details	Leisel Jones; Australia	1:05.72; CR	Tara Kirk; USA	1:06.34	Anna Khlistunova; Ukraine	1:07.27; ER
200 m breaststroke details	Leisel Jones; Australia	2:21.84	Kirsty Balfour; Great Britain; Megan Jendrick; USA	2:25.94		
50 m butterfly details	Therese Alshammar; Sweden	25.91	Danni Miatke; Australia	26.05; OC	Inge Dekker; Netherlands	26.11
100 m butterfly details	Libby Lenton; Australia	57.15; CR, =OC	Jessicah Schipper; Australia	57.24	Natalie Coughlin; USA	57.34; AM
200 m butterfly details	Jessicah Schipper; Australia	2:06.39	Kim Vandenberg; USA	2:06.71	Otylia Jędrzejczak; Poland	2:06.90
200 m individual medley details	Katie Hoff; USA	2:10.13; CR	Kirsty Coventry; Zimbabwe	2:10.76; AF	Stephanie Rice; Australia	2:11.42; OC
400 m individual medley details	Katie Hoff; USA	4:32.89; WR	Yana Martynova; Russia	4:40.14; NR	Stephanie Rice; Australia	4:41.19
4 × 100 m freestyle relay details	Australia; Libby Lenton (53.42) CR, =OC; Melanie Schlanger (53.95); Shayne Reese (54.90); Jodie Henry (53.21); Danni Miatke^{[b]} Sally Foster^{[b]}	3:35.48; CR, OC	USA; Natalie Coughlin (54.13); Lacey Nymeyer (53.50); Amanda Weir (54.02); Kara Lynn Joyce (54.03); Dana Vollmer^{[b]}	3:35.68; AM	Netherlands; Inge Dekker (54.57); Ranomi Kromowidjojo (54.82); Femke Heemskerk (54.13); Marleen Veldhuis (53.29); Chantal Groot^{[b]}	3:36.81; NR
4 × 200 m freestyle relay details	USA; Natalie Coughlin (1:56.43) AM; Dana Vollmer (1:57.49); Lacey Nymeyer (1:59.19); Katie Hoff (1:56.98); Amanda Weir^{[b]} Margaret Hoelzer^{[b]} Kara Lynn Joyce^{[b]}	7:50.09; WR	Germany; Meike Freitag (1:59.56); Britta Steffen (1:57.58); Petra Dallmann (2:00.40); Annika Lurz (1:56.28)	7:53.82	France; Alena Popchanka (1:57.86); Sophie Huber (1:58.80); Aurore Mongel (2:01.04); Laure Manaudou (1:58.26); Céline Couderc	7:55.96; NR
4 × 100 m medley relay details	Australia; Emily Seebohm (1:00.79); Leisel Jones (1:04.94); Jessicah Schipper (57.18); Libby Lenton (52.83); Tarnee White^{[b]} Felicity Galvez^{[b]} Jodie Henry^{[b]}	3:55.74; WR	USA; Natalie Coughlin (1:00.66); Tara Kirk (1:06.37); Rachel Komisarz (57.06); Lacey Nymeyer (54.22); Leila Vaziri^{[b]} Jessica Hardy^{[b]} Dana Vollmer^{[b]} Amanda Weir^{[b]}	3:58.31	China; Xu Tianlongzi (1:01.06); Luo Nan (1:09.08); Zhou Yafei (57.84); Xu Yanwei (53.99)	4:01.97

=== Medal table ===
* Host nation (Australia)

Rank	Nation	Gold	Silver	Bronze	Total
1	United States	20	13	3	36
2	Australia*	9	7	5	21
3	France	2	2	2	6
4	Poland	2	1	1	4
5	South Africa	2	0	1	3
6	Japan	1	2	4	7
7	Italy	1	1	4	6
8	Sweden	1	1	1	3
9	Canada	1	0	1	2
9	South Korea	1	0	1	2
9	Ukraine	1	0	1	2
12	Germany	0	3	1	4
13	Netherlands	0	2	3	5
13	Russia	0	2	3	5
15	Zimbabwe	0	2	0	2
16	Great Britain	0	1	3	4
17	China	0	1	1	2
18	Belarus	0	1	0	1
18	Switzerland	0	1	0	1
20	Austria	0	0	1	1
20	Denmark	0	0	1	1
20	Hungary	0	0	1	1
20	Venezuela	0	0	1	1
Totals (23 entries)		41	40	39	120

On 11 September 2007, an anti-doping ban was issued to Tunisia's Oussama Mellouli, with a retroactive nullification of his results which included his swims at the 2007 Worlds. Mellouli had finished in the top-3 in 2 events, and consequently, his results nullification adjusted the overall medals standings, particularly effecting Australia, Italy, Poland, Russia and Tunisia (Tunisia was removed all together, as Mellouli was the country's only medal winner).

== Records ==
The following world and championship records were broken during the competition.

=== World records ===
Date	Event	Time	Name	Nation
March 27	Men's 200 m freestyle final	1:43.86	Michael Phelps	United States
March 27	Women's 100 m backstroke final	59.44	Natalie Coughlin	United States
March 27	Men's 100 m backstroke final	52.98	Aaron Peirsol	United States
March 27	Women's 200 m freestyle semifinals	1:56.47	Federica Pellegrini	Italy
March 28	Women's 50 m backstroke semifinals	28.16	Leila Vaziri	United States
March 28	Men's 200 m butterfly final	1:52.09	Michael Phelps	United States
March 28	Women's 200 m freestyle final	1:55.52	Laure Manaudou	France
March 29	Men's 200 m individual medley final	1:54.98	Michael Phelps	United States
March 29	Women's 50 m backstroke final	=28.16	Leila Vaziri	United States
March 29	Women's 4 × 200 m freestyle relay final	7:50.09	Natalie Coughlin (1:56.43); Dana Vollmer (1:57.49); Lacey Nymeyer (1:59.19); Katie Hoff (1:56.98)	United States
March 30	Men's 200 m backstroke final	1:54.32	Ryan Lochte	United States
March 30	Men's 4 × 200 m freestyle relay final	7:03.24	Michael Phelps (1:45.36); Ryan Lochte (1:45.86); Klete Keller (1:46.31); Peter Vanderkaay (1:45.71)	United States
March 31	Women's 4 × 100 metre medley relay final	3:55.74	Emily Seebohm (1:00.79); Leisel Jones (1:04.94); Jessicah Schipper (57.18); Libby Lenton (52.83)	Australia
April 1	Men's 400 m individual medley final	4:06.22	Michael Phelps	United States
April 1	Women's 400 m individual medley final	4:32.89	Katie Hoff	United States

=== Championship records ===
Date	Event	Established for	Time	Name	Nation
March 25	Women's 400 metre freestyle heats	(same)	4:05.29	Laure Manaudou	France
March 25	Women's 400 metre freestyle final	(same)	4:02.61	Laure Manaudou	France
March 25	Women's 4 × 100 metre freestyle relay final	Women's 100 metre freestyle	53.42	Libby Lenton	Australia
March 25	Women's 4 × 100 metre freestyle relay final	(same)	3:35.48	Libby Lenton (53.42); Melanie Schlanger (53.95); Shayne Reese (54.90); Jodie Henry (53.21)	Australia
March 25	Men's 4 × 100 metre freestyle relay final	(same)	3:12.72	Michael Phelps (48.42); Neil Walker (48.31); Cullen Jones (48.67); Jason Lezak (47.32)	United States
March 26	Women's 100 metre butterfly final	(same)	57.15	Libby Lenton	Australia
March 26	Men's 100 metre backstroke semifinals	(same)	53.51	Ryan Lochte	United States
March 26	Women's 200 metre individual medley final	(same)	2:10.13	Katie Hoff	United States
March 27	Women's 1500 metre freestyle final	(same)	15:53.05	Kate Ziegler	United States
March 27	Women's 100 metre breaststroke final	(same)	1:05.72	Leisel Jones	Australia
March 28	Women's 50 metre backstroke heats	(same)	28.25	Leila Vaziri	United States
March 29	Women's 100 metre freestyle semifinals	(same)	53.40	Natalie Coughlin	United States
March 30	Women's 100 metre freestyle final	(same)	=53.40	Libby Lenton	Australia
March 30	Women's 50 metre butterfly semifinal	(same)	25.82	Therese Alshammar	Sweden
March 31	Women's 200 metre backstroke final	(same)	2:07.16	Margaret Hoelzer	United States
March 31	Women's 800 metre freestyle final	(same)	8:18.52	Kate Ziegler	United States
