= Swimming at the 2007 World Aquatics Championships – Women's 200 metre backstroke =

The Women's 200m Backstroke at the 2007 World Aquatics Championships took place on 30 March (prelims & semifinals) and the evening of 31 March (finals) at the Rod Laver Arena in Melbourne, Australia. 59 swimmers were entered in the event, of which 56 swam.

Existing records at the start of the event were:

- World Record (WR): 2:06.62, Krisztina Egerszegi (Hungary), 25 August 1991 in Athens, Greece.
- Championship Record (CR): 2:07.40, HE Cihong (China), Rome 1994 (11 September 1994)

== Results ==
=== Finals ===
Place	Name	Nationality	Time	Note
1st	Margaret Hoelzer	USA	2:07.16	CR, NR
2nd	Kirsty Coventry	Zimbabwe	2:07.54	
3rd	Reiko Nakamura	Japan	2:08.54	
4th	Esther Baron	France	2:09.59	
5th	Hanae Ito	Japan	2:10.57	
6th	Nikolett Szepesi	Hungary	2:10.66	
7th	Elizabeth Simmonds	Great Britain	2:11.09	
8th	Alessia Filippi	Italy	2:11.41	

=== Semifinals ===
Rank	Swimmer	Nation	Time	Note
1	Margaret Hoelzer	USA	2:07.70	Q, NR
2	Kirsty Coventry	Zimbabwe	2:07.76	Q
3	Reiko Nakamura	Japan	2:08.82	Q
4	Esther Baron	France	2:10.55	Q
5	Hanae Ito	Japan	2:10.69	Q
6	Alessia Filippi	Italy	2:11.16	Q
6	Nikolett Szepesi	Hungary	2:11.16	Q
8	Elizabeth Simmonds	Great Britain	2:11.20	Q
9	Iryna Amshennikova	Ukraine	2:11.49	
10	Escarlata Bernard Gonzalez	Spain	2:11.72	
11	Frances Adcock	Australia	2:12.04	
12	Elizabeth Beisel	USA	2:12.09	
13	Hannah McLean	New Zealand	2:13.12	
14	Joanna Fargus	Australia	2:13.22	
15	Evelyn Verrasztó	Hungary	2:13.52	
16	Melissa Ingram	New Zealand	2:14.07	

=== Preliminaries ===
Rank	Swimmer	Nation	Time	Note
1	Kirsty Coventry	Zimbabwe	2:07.99	Q
2	Esther Baron	France	2:09.77	Q
3	Margaret Hoelzer	USA	2:10.25	Q
4	Nikolett Szepesi	Hungary	2:10.85	Q
5	Reiko Nakamura	Japan	2:11.12	Q
6	Joanna Fargus	Australia	2:11.50	Q
7	Frances Adcock	Australia	2:11.60	Q
8	Elizabeth Beisel	USA	2:11.91	Q
9	Hanae Ito	Japan	2:11.92	Q
10	Escarlata Bernard Gonzalez	Spain	2:12.43	Q
11	Hannah McLean	New Zealand	2:12.58	Q
12	Elizabeth Simmonds	Great Britain	2:12.68	Q
13	Melissa Ingram	New Zealand	2:12.97	Q
14	Alessia Filippi	Italy	2:13.03	Q
15	Evelyn Verrasztó	Hungary	2:13.04	Q
16	Iryna Amshennikova	Ukraine	2:13.05	Q
17	Zhao Jing	China	2:13.12	
18	Carin Möller	Sweden	2:13.32	NR
19	Anastasia Zuyeva	Russia	2:13.54	
20	Melanie Marshall	Great Britain	2:13.60	
21	Kelly Stefanyshyn	Canada	2:13.65	
22	Aliaksandra Kavaleva	Belarus	2:14.09	
23	Erin Volcán	Venezuela	2:14.89	
24	Anna Gostomelsky	Israel	2:14.92	
25	Nicole Hetzer	Germany	2:15.02	
26	Julia Wilkinson	Canada	2:15.39	
27	BAI Anqi	China	2:15.51	
28	Iwona Lefanowicz	Poland	2:15.58	
29	Therese Svendsen	Sweden	2:16.18	
30	Sanja Jovanović	Croatia	2:16.38	
31	Kateryna Zubkova	Ukraine	2:16.52	
32	Melanie Nocher	Ireland	2:17.29	
33	Valentina Georgiana Brat	Romania	2:18.78	
34	Yoo Jin Jung	South Korea	2:18.80	
35	Lourdes Villaseñor	Mexico	2:20.47	
36	Man Hsu Lin	Chinese Taipei	2:21.55	
37	Nam Eun Lee	South Korea	2:22.25	
38	Nimitta Thaveesupsoonthron	Thailand	2:22.66	
39	Hsu Jung He	Chinese Taipei	2:24.22	
40	Nazil Ege Calisal	Turkey	2:25.03	
41	Ming Xiu Ong	Malaysia	2:25.15	
42	Kiera Aitken	Bermuda	2:26.32	
43	Sook Fun Chai	Malaysia	2:26.38	
44	Maftunabonu Tuhtasinova	Uzbekistan	2:26.55	
45	Wenika Kaewchaiwong	Thailand	2:27.22	
46	Khadija Ciss	Senegal	2:27.55	
47	Layla Alghul	Jordan	2:27.77	
48	Slavica Pavic	Peru	2:28.02	
49	Yulduz Kuchkarova	Uzbekistan	2:29.05	
50	Thi Cuc Hoang	Vietnam	2:29.20	
51	Weng Kuan	Macao	2:30.61	
52	Massie Milagros Carrillo	Peru	2:32.06	
53	Lacy Palmer-Martin	Saint Lucia	2:39.24	
54	Siona Huxley	Saint Lucia	2:40.96	
55	Anouchka Diane Etiennette	Mauritius	2:44.35	
56	Dalia Massiel Torrez Zamora	Nicaragua	2:45.98	
--	Valerie Eman	Aruba	DNS	
--	Obia Inyengiyikabo	Nigeria	DNS	
--	Annika Lurz	Germany	DNS	
