= Swimming at the 2008 Summer Olympics – Women's 200 metre backstroke =

Women's 200 metre backstroke at the Games of the XXIX Olympiad
- Venue: Beijing National Aquatics Center
- Date: August 14, 2008 (heats); August 15, 2008 (semifinals); August 16, 2008 (final)
- Competitors: 35 from 24 nations
- Winning time: 2:05.24 WR

Medalists
1st place, gold medalist(s)		Kirsty Coventry	Zimbabwe
2nd place, silver medalist(s)		Margaret Hoelzer	United States
3rd place, bronze medalist(s)		Reiko Nakamura	Japan

The women's 200 metre backstroke event at the 2008 Olympic Games took place on 14–16 August at the Beijing National Aquatics Center in Beijing, China.

After claiming three silver medals at these Games, Zimbabwe's Kirsty Coventry stormed home on the final lap to defend her Olympic title in the event. She posted a time of 2:05.24 to crush a world record set by U.S. swimmer Margaret Hoelzer from the Olympic trials one month earlier. Meanwhile, Hoelzer added a silver to her hardware from the 100 m backstroke, when she touched the wall in 2:06.23, the second-fastest effort of her career. Japan's Reiko Nakamura managed to repeat a bronze from Athens four years earlier, in an Asian record of 2:07.13.

Russia's top favorite Anastasia Zuyeva finished fourth with a time of 2:07.88, and was followed in the fifth spot by American teenager Elizabeth Beisel, aged 16, in 2:08.23. Elizabeth Simmonds set a new British record of 2:08.51 to earn a sixth spot, while Aussies Meagan Nay (2:08.84) and Belinda Hocking (2:10.12) closed out the field. Notable swimmers missed out the top 8 final, featuring Russia's Stanislava Komarova, silver medalist in Athens, and British top favorite Gemma Spofforth.

Before her breakthrough final, Coventry broke one of the oldest Olympic records earlier in the prelims. She posted a top-seeded time of 2:06.76 to lead 34 other swimmers in the race, slashing four-tenths of a second (0.40) off the record set by Hungary's three-time Olympic champion Krisztina Egerszegi from Barcelona in 1992.

== Records ==
Prior to this competition, the existing world and Olympic records were as follows.

World record	Margaret Hoelzer (USA)	2:06.09	Omaha, United States	5 July 2008	
Olympic record	Krisztina Egerszegi (HUN)	2:07.06	Barcelona, Spain	31 July 1992	-

The following new world and Olympic records were set during this competition.

Date	Event	Name	Nationality	Time	Record
August 14	Heat 4	Kirsty Coventry	Zimbabwe	2:06.76	OR
August 16	Final	Kirsty Coventry	Zimbabwe	2:05.24	WR

== Results ==
=== Heats ===
Rank	Heat	Lane	Name	Nationality	Time	Notes
1	4	4	Kirsty Coventry	Zimbabwe	2:06.76	Q, OR
2	5	6	Elizabeth Simmonds	Great Britain	2:08.66	Q, NR
3	4	3	Meagen Nay	Australia	2:08.79	Q
4	3	5	Zhao Jing	China	2:08.97	Q
5	3	3	Anastasia Zuyeva	Russia	2:09.01	Q
6	5	5	Elizabeth Beisel	United States	2:09.02	Q
7	5	4	Margaret Hoelzer	United States	2:09.12	Q
8	4	2	Melissa Ingram	New Zealand	2:09.34	Q
9	4	5	Alexianne Castel	France	2:09.37	Q
10	3	4	Laure Manaudou	France	2:09.39	Q
11	3	6	Belinda Hocking	Australia	2:09.54	Q
12	5	3	Reiko Nakamura	Japan	2:09.77	Q
13	5	7	Stanislava Komarova	Russia	2:09.93	Q
14	4	6	Hanae Ito	Japan	2:10.05	Q
15	3	1	Anja Čarman	Slovenia	2:10.49	Q, NR
16	3	2	Gemma Spofforth	Great Britain	2:10.58	Q
17	3	7	Evelyn Verrasztó	Hungary	2:11.02	
18	5	2	Nikolett Szepesi	Hungary	2:11.47	
19	4	8	Chen Yanyan	China	2:11.95	
20	2	7	Melanie Nocher	Ireland	2:12.29	NR
21	2	6	Zuzanna Mazurek	Poland	2:12.46	NR
22	4	7	Melissa Corfe	South Africa	2:12.64	
22	5	8	Kateryna Zubkova	Ukraine	2:12.64	
24	5	1	Escarlata Bernard	Spain	2:12.86	
25	2	4	Lydia Morant	Spain	2:13.87	
26	1	3	Kang Yeong-seo	South Korea	2:14.52	
27	1	5	Gisela Morales	Guatemala	2:14.54	
28	2	8	Fernanda González	Mexico	2:14.64	
29	2	1	Stella Boumi	Greece	2:14.73	
30	3	8	Lindsay Seemann	Canada	2:15.07	
31	2	3	Sanja Jovanović	Croatia	2:15.57	
32	1	4	Erin Volcán	Venezuela	2:15.58	
33	4	1	Iryna Amshennikova	Ukraine	2:15.78	
34	2	5	Christin Zenner	Germany	2:20.28	
	2	2	Julia Wilkinson	Canada	DNS	

=== Semifinals ===
==== Semifinal 1 ====
Rank	Lane	Name	Nationality	Time	Notes
1	3	Elizabeth Beisel	United States	2:07.90	Q
2	7	Reiko Nakamura	Japan	2:08.21	Q, NR
3	4	Elizabeth Simmonds	Great Britain	2:08.96	Q
4	8	Gemma Spofforth	Great Britain	2:09.19	
5	5	Zhao Jing	China	2:09.59	
6	6	Melissa Ingram	New Zealand	2:09.70	
7	1	Hanae Ito	Japan	2:09.86	
8	2	Laure Manaudou	France	2:12.04	

==== Semifinal 2 ====
Rank	Lane	Name	Nationality	Time	Notes
1	4	Kirsty Coventry	Zimbabwe	2:07.76	Q
2	5	Meagen Nay	Australia	2:08.09	Q, OC
3	6	Margaret Hoelzer	United States	2:08.25	Q
4	7	Belinda Hocking	Australia	2:08.80	Q
5	3	Anastasia Zuyeva	Russia	2:09.07	Q
6	2	Alexianne Castel	France	2:10.04	
7	1	Stanislava Komarova	Russia	2:10.50	
8	8	Anja Čarman	Slovenia	2:12.46	

=== Final ===
Rank	Lane	Name	Nationality	Time	Notes
1st place, gold medalist(s)	4	Kirsty Coventry	Zimbabwe	2:05.24	WR
2nd place, silver medalist(s)	2	Margaret Hoelzer	United States	2:06.23	
3rd place, bronze medalist(s)	6	Reiko Nakamura	Japan	2:07.13	AS
4	8	Anastasia Zuyeva	Russia	2:07.88	
5	5	Elizabeth Beisel	United States	2:08.23	
6	1	Elizabeth Simmonds	Great Britain	2:08.51	NR
7	3	Meagen Nay	Australia	2:08.84	
8	7	Belinda Hocking	Australia	2:10.12	
