= 2006 Pan Pacific Swimming Championships – Women's 200 metre backstroke =

Women's 200 metre backstroke at the 2006 Pan Pacific Swimming Championships
- Venue: Saanich Commonwealth Place
- Dates: August 19, 2006 (heats & finals)
- Competitors: 29 from 12 nations
- Winning time: 2:08.86

Medalists
gold medal	Reiko Nakamura	Japan
silver medal	Margaret Hoelzer	United States
bronze medal	Takami Igarashi	Japan

The women's 200 metre backstroke competition at the 2006 Pan Pacific Swimming Championships took place on August 19 at the Saanich Commonwealth Place. The last champion was Margaret Hoelzer of US.

This race consisted of four lengths of the pool, all in backstroke.

== Records ==
Prior to this competition, the existing world and Pan Pacific records were as follows:

World record	Krisztina Egerszegi (HUN)	2:06.62	Athens, Greece	August 25, 1991
Pan Pacific Championships record	Anna Simcic (NZL)	2:10.79	Edmonton, Canada	August 25, 1991

== Results ==
All times are in minutes and seconds.

KEY:	q	Fastest non-qualifiers	Q	Qualified	CR	Championships record	NR	National record	PB	Personal best	SB	Seasonal best

=== Heats ===
The first round was held on August 19, at 11:01.

Rank	Heat	Lane	Name	Nationality	Time	Notes
1	3	5	Takami Igarashi	Japan	2:10.02	QA, CR
2	3	4	Reiko Nakamura	Japan	2:10.14	QA
3	4	5	Margaret Hoelzer	United States	2:10.20	QA
4	4	4	Hanae Ito	Japan	2:10.76	QA
5	2	5	Elizabeth Beisel	United States	2:11.68	QA
6	2	4	Joanna Fargus	Australia	2:12.30	QA
7	4	3	Melissa Ingram	New Zealand	2:12.75	QA
8	2	3	Fran Adcock	Australia	2:12.88	QA
9	4	6	Teresa Crippen	United States	2:12.90	QB
10	3	2	Kirsty Coventry	Zimbabwe	2:13.11	QB
11	4	7	Ariana Kukors	United States	2:13.34	QB
12	2	2	Lauren English	United States	2:14.33	QB
13	2	6	Karina Leane	Australia	2:14.52	QB
14	3	6	Melissa Corfe	South Africa	2:14.64	QB
15	3	7	Jung Yoo-Jin	South Korea	2:15.39	QB
16	3	3	Hannah McLean	New Zealand	2:15.60	QB
17	4	2	Kelly Stefanyshyn	Canada	2:15.99	
18	3	1	Kristen Caverly	United States	2:16.14	
19	1	4	Leila Vaziri	United States	2:17.43	
20	4	8	Lee Nam-Eun	South Korea	2:17.59	
21	3	8	Karah Stanworth	Canada	2:17.62	
22	4	1	Liu Zhen	China	2:18.38	
23	2	1	Jennifer Reilly	Australia	2:18.63	
24	2	7	Melanie Bouchard	Canada	2:18.75	
25	1	6	Monica Stitski	Canada	2:18.95	
26	1	5	He Hsu-Jung	Chinese Taipei	2:20.29	
27	2	8	Tsai Hiu-Wai	Hong Kong	2:20.52	
28	1	3	Joanna Maranhão	Brazil	2:23.37	
29	1	2	Chelsey Salli	Canada	2:24.17	

=== B Final ===
The B final was held on August 19, at 19:19.

Rank	Lane	Name	Nationality	Time	Notes
9	4	Hanae Ito	Japan	2:09.21	
10	5	Teresa Crippen	United States	2:12.38	
11	7	Hannah McLean	New Zealand	2:13.65	
12	6	Melissa Corfe	South Africa	2:13.79	
13	1	Kelly Stefanyshyn	Canada	2:13.83	
14	2	Jung Yoo-Jin	South Korea	2:14.87	
15	3	Karina Leane	Australia	2:15.65	
16	8	Lee Nam-Eun	South Korea	2:18.74	

=== A Final ===
The A final was held on August 19, at 19:19.

Rank	Lane	Name	Nationality	Time	Notes
1st place, gold medalist(s)	5	Reiko Nakamura	Japan	2:08.86	CR
2nd place, silver medalist(s)	3	Margaret Hoelzer	United States	2:09.42	
3rd place, bronze medalist(s)	4	Takami Igarashi	Japan	2:10.30	
4	8	Kirsty Coventry	Zimbabwe	2:12.34	
5	6	Elizabeth Beisel	United States	2:12.61	
6	2	Joanna Fargus	Australia	2:13.48	
7	7	Melissa Ingram	New Zealand	2:13.64	
8	1	Fran Adcock	Australia	2:14.88	
