= Swimming at the 2008 Summer Olympics – Women's 100 metre backstroke =

Women's 100 metre backstroke at the Games of the XXIX Olympiad
- Venue: Beijing National Aquatics Center
- Date: August 10, 2008 (heats); August 11, 2008(semifinals); August 12, 2008 (final)
- Competitors: 49 from 38 nations
- Winning time: 58.96 AM

Medalists
1st place, gold medalist(s)		Natalie Coughlin	United States
2nd place, silver medalist(s)		Kirsty Coventry	Zimbabwe
3rd place, bronze medalist(s)		Margaret Hoelzer	United States

The women's 100 metre backstroke event at the 2008 Olympic Games took place on 10–12 August at the Beijing National Aquatics Center in Beijing, China.

U.S. swimmer Natalie Coughlin set a lifetime best and an American record of 58.96 to defend her title in the event. Zimbabwe's new world record holder Kirsty Coventry added a second silver to her hardware from the 400 m individual medley two days earlier, in a time of 59.19. Coming from fifth place in the turn, Margaret Hoelzer continued her impressive form in the shorter backstroke to pick up a bronze in 59.34, handing the entire medal haul for Team USA in the pool.

Great Britain's Gemma Spofforth narrowly missed the podium by a twenty-fifth of a second (0.04), posting a European record of 59.38 for a fourth-place finish. Russia's Anastasia Zuyeva finished fifth in a close race at 59.40, and was followed in the sixth spot by Japan's Reiko Nakamura in 59.72. France's Laure Manaudou (1:00.10), bronze medalist in Athens four years earlier, and Japanese Hanae Ito (1:00.18) rounded out the finale.

Earlier in the prelims, Zuyeva, Nakamura, and Coventry scratched out Coughlin's existing Olympic record, as they went under a time of 59.68 to lead all seeded heats. The following morning, in the semifinals, Coventry blitzed the field on the final lap to set a new world record of 58.77, breaking Coughlin's mark by two-tenths of a second (0.20).

== Records ==
Prior to this competition, the existing world and Olympic records were as follows.

World record	Natalie Coughlin (USA)	58.97	Omaha, United States	1 July 2008
Olympic record	Natalie Coughlin (USA)	59.68	Athens, Greece	21 August 2004

The following new world and Olympic records were set during this competition.

Date	Event	Name	Nationality	Time	Record
August 10	Heat 5	Anastasia Zuyeva	Russia	59.61	OR
August 10	Heat 6	Reiko Nakamura	Japan	59.36	OR
August 10	Heat 7	Kirsty Coventry	Zimbabwe	59.00	OR
August 11	Semifinal 2	Kirsty Coventry	Zimbabwe	58.77	WR

== Results ==
=== Heats ===
Rank	Heat	Lane	Name	Nationality	Time	Notes
1	7	5	Kirsty Coventry	Zimbabwe	59.00	Q, OR, AF
2	6	6	Reiko Nakamura	Japan	59.36	Q, AS
3	5	4	Anastasia Zuyeva	Russia	59.61	Q, NR
4	7	4	Natalie Coughlin	United States	59.69	Q
5	6	5	Laure Manaudou	France	1:00.09	Q
6	7	6	Gemma Spofforth	Great Britain	1:00.11	Q
7	6	4	Margaret Hoelzer	United States	1:00.13	Q
8	6	3	Hanae Ito	Japan	1:00.16	Q
9	5	5	Emily Seebohm	Australia	1:00.27	Q
10	4	3	Julia Wilkinson	Canada	1:00.38	Q
11	5	8	Antje Buschschulte	Germany	1:00.48	Q
12	5	2	Elizabeth Simmonds	Great Britain	1:00.53	Q
13	5	6	Nina Zhivanevskaya	Spain	1:00.54	Q
14	5	3	Sophie Edington	Australia	1:00.65	Q
15	7	1	Elizabeth Coster	New Zealand	1:00.66	Q
16	6	1	Kseniya Moskvina	Russia	1:00.70	Q
17	5	1	Xu Tianlongzi	China	1:00.82	
18	7	7	Fabíola Molina	Brazil	1:01.00	
19	3	3	Carolina Colorado Henao	Colombia	1:01.19	NR
20	4	4	Melissa Ingram	New Zealand	1:01.24	
21	5	7	Kateryna Zubkova	Ukraine	1:01.25	
22	6	2	Sanja Jovanović	Croatia	1:01.30	
23	7	2	Alexianne Castel	France	1:01.44	
24	7	8	Nikolett Szepesi	Hungary	1:01.77	
25	3	2	Anna Gostomelsky	Israel	1:01.87	NR
26	4	6	Romina Armellini	Italy	1:02.21	
26	4	8	Anja Čarman	Slovenia	1:02.21	
28	4	5	Mercedes Peris	Spain	1:02.30	
29	3	1	Sarah Sjöström	Sweden	1:02.38	
30	4	2	Hanna-Maria Seppälä	Finland	1:02.39	
31	4	1	Aisling Cooney	Ireland	1:02.50	
32	3	7	Alana Dillette	Bahamas	1:02.56	
33	1	4	Kiera Aitken	Bermuda	1:02.62	
34	3	4	Tsai Hiu Wai Sherry	Hong Kong	1:02.68	
35	3	5	Fernanda González	Mexico	1:02.76	
36	2	4	Zuzanna Mazurek	Poland	1:02.77	NR
37	6	7	Iryna Amshennikova	Ukraine	1:02.85	
38	2	5	Gisela Morales	Guatemala	1:02.92	
39	3	6	Petra Klosová	Czech Republic	1:03.36	
40	2	3	Marica Strazmester	Serbia	1:03.56	
41	3	8	Sarah Blake Bateman	Iceland	1:03.82	
42	6	8	Christin Zenner	Germany	1:03.87	
43	2	7	Erin Volcán	Venezuela	1:03.90	
44	2	6	Kim Yu-yeon	South Korea	1:04.63	
45	2	2	Yekaterina Rudenko	Kazakhstan	1:04.85	
46	1	5	Maria Virginia Baez	Paraguay	1:05.39	
47	1	3	Christie Bodden	Panama	1:07.18	
	7	3	Zhao Jing	China	DSQ	
	4	7	Sviatlana Khakhlova	Belarus	DNS	

=== Semifinals ===
==== Semifinal 1 ====
Rank	Lane	Name	Nationality	Time	Notes
1	5	Natalie Coughlin	United States	59.43	Q
2	4	Reiko Nakamura	Japan	59.64	Q
3	3	Gemma Spofforth	Great Britain	59.79	Q
4	6	Hanae Ito	Japan	1:00.13	Q
5	7	Elizabeth Simmonds	Great Britain	1:00.39	
6	2	Julia Wilkinson	Canada	1:00.60	
7	1	Sophie Edington	Australia	1:01.05	
8	8	Kseniya Moskvina	Russia	1:01.06	

==== Semifinal 2 ====
Rank	Lane	Name	Nationality	Time	Notes
1	4	Kirsty Coventry	Zimbabwe	58.77	Q, WR
2	5	Anastasia Zuyeva	Russia	59.77	Q
3	6	Margaret Hoelzer	United States	59.84	Q
4	3	Laure Manaudou	France	1:00.19	Q
5	2	Emily Seebohm	Australia	1:00.31	
6	1	Nina Zhivanevskaya	Spain	1:00.50	
7	7	Antje Buschschulte	Germany	1:01.15	
8	8	Elizabeth Coster	New Zealand	1:01.45	

=== Final ===
Rank	Lane	Name	Nationality	Time	Notes
1st place, gold medalist(s)	5	Natalie Coughlin	United States	58.96	AM
2nd place, silver medalist(s)	4	Kirsty Coventry	Zimbabwe	59.19	
3rd place, bronze medalist(s)	7	Margaret Hoelzer	United States	59.34	
4	2	Gemma Spofforth	Great Britain	59.38	ER
5	6	Anastasia Zuyeva	Russia	59.40	NR
6	3	Reiko Nakamura	Japan	59.72	
7	8	Laure Manaudou	France	1:00.10	
8	1	Hanae Ito	Japan	1:00.18	
