= Christie Bodden =

Panamanian swimmer (born 1990)

Personal information
- Full name: Christie Marie Bodden Baca
- National team: Panama
- Born: 3 March 1990 (age 36) Panama City, Panama
- Height: 1.67 m (5 ft 6 in)
- Weight: 51 kg (112 lb)

Sport
- Sport: Swimming
- Strokes: Backstroke
- College team: Stony Brook University (U.S.)

Christie Marie Bodden Baca (born March 3, 1990) is a Panamanian former swimmer who specializes in backstroke events. She has been selected to represent Panama at the 2008 Summer Olympics, placing among the top 48 swimmers in the women's 100 m backstroke.

Bodden was invited by FINA to compete as a lone female swimmer for Panama in the 100 m backstroke at the 2008 Summer Olympics in Beijing. Swimming against Bermuda's Kiera Aitken and Paraguay's María Virginia Báez in heat one, Bodden faded down the stretch to round out the small field to third place in 1:07.18. Finishing last out of 48 entrants in her event, Bodden failed to advance to the semifinals.

A business management graduate of Stony Brook University in Stony Brook, New York, Bodden currently works as a brand manager for top selling brands in Panama.
