= 50 metres backstroke =

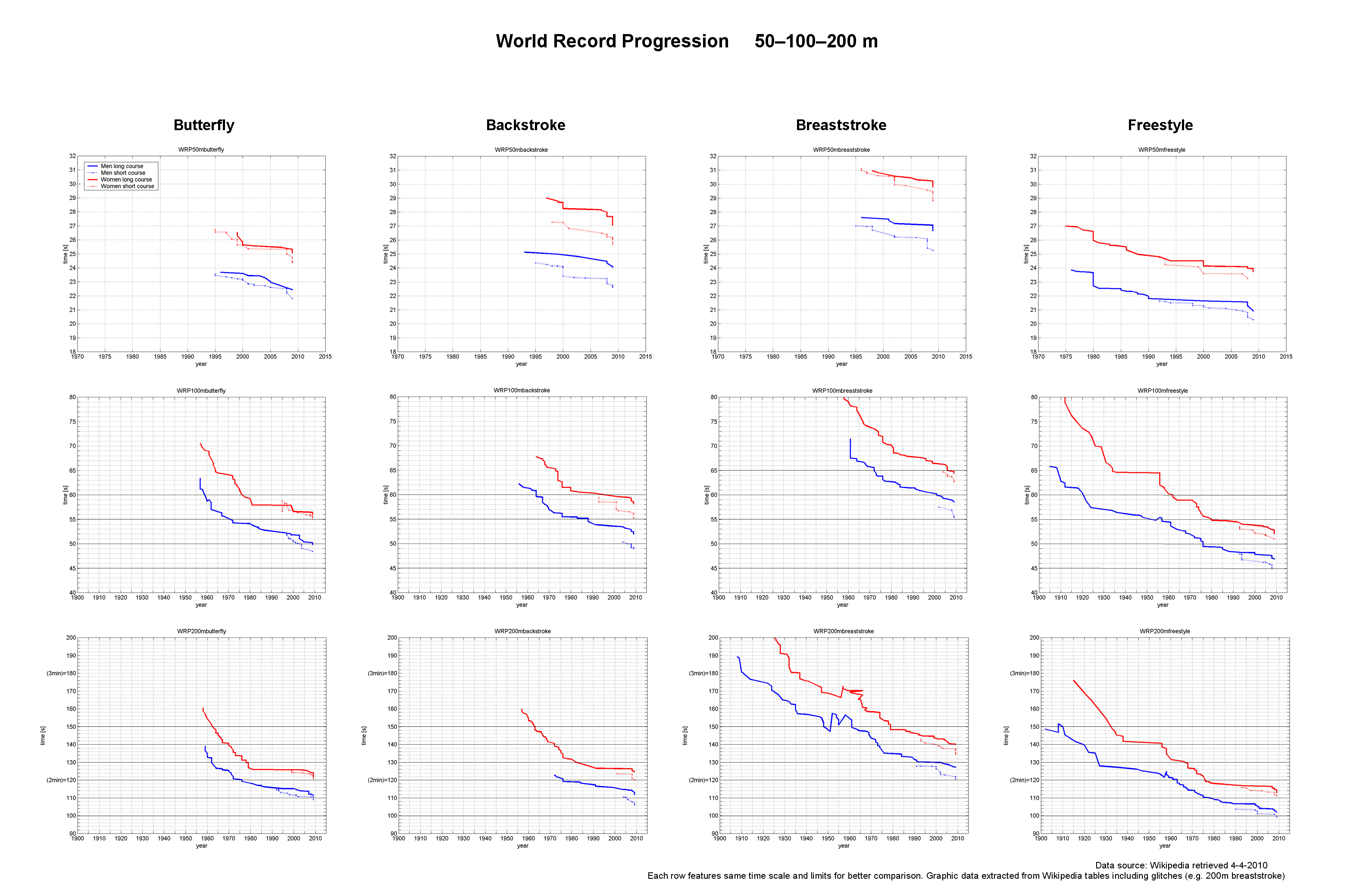
Graphic data for World Record Progression in Men and Women Swimming 50m-100m-200m Long and Short Course Butterfly-Backstroke-Breaststroke-Freestyle

The 50 metres backstroke is an event in competitive swimming. World records are ratified by World Aquatics (formerly FINA). The current long course world record holders are Russia's Kliment Kolesnikov and Italy's Sara Curtis, while the current short course world record holders are South Africa's Pieter Coetze and the US' Regan Smith.

The men's and women's events have been contested at the World Aquatics Championships since 2001; the current world champions (long course) are Kolesnikov, and the US' Katharine Berkoff. The men's and women's events have been contested at the World Aquatics Swimming Championships (25m) since 1999; the current world champions (short course) are Miron Lifintsev and Smith.

== World record progression ==
=== Men long course ===
#	Time		Name	Nationality	Date	Meet	Location	Ref
WB	25.13		Jeff Rouse	United States	15 April 1993	Robert Burns Invitational	Edinburgh, United Kingdom	
1	24.99	tt	Lenny Krayzelburg	United States	28 August 1999	Pan Pacific Championships	Sydney, Australia	
2	24.80		Thomas Rupprath	Germany	27 July 2003	World Championships	Barcelona, Spain	
3	24.47	h, †	Liam Tancock	Great Britain	2 April 2008	British Championships	Sheffield, United Kingdom	
4	24.33		Randall Bal	United States	5 December 2008	Eindhoven Cup	Eindhoven, Netherlands	
5	24.08	sf	Liam Tancock	Great Britain	1 August 2009	World Championships	Rome, Italy	
6	24.04		Liam Tancock	Great Britain	2 Aug 2009	World Championships	Rome, Italy	
7	24.00		Kliment Kolesnikov	Russia	4 Aug 2018	European Championships	Glasgow, Great Britain	
8	23.93	sf	Kliment Kolesnikov	Russia	17 May 2021	European Championships	Budapest, Hungary	
9	23.80		Kliment Kolesnikov	Russia	18 May 2021	European Championships	Budapest, Hungary	
10	23.71		Hunter Armstrong	United States	28 April 2022	USA International Team Trials	Greensboro, United States	
11	23.55	sf	Kliment Kolesnikov	Russia	27 July 2023	Russian Cup	Kazan, Russia	

Legend: # – Record awaiting ratification by FINA; e – equalled existing record;
Records not set in finals: h – heat; sf – semifinal; r – relay 1st leg; rh – relay heat 1st leg; b – B final; † – en route to final mark; so – swim-off; tt – time trial

=== Men short course ===
#	Time		Name	Nationality	Date	Meet	Location	Ref
1	25.10		Daichi Suzuki	Japan	10 Feb 1990	World Cup	Bonn, West Germany	
#	24.66		Alexander Popov	Russia	13 March 1994	World Cup	Desenzano, Italy	
2	24.60		Franck Schott	France	26 March 1994	World Cup	Paris, France	
3	24.37	h	Jeff Rouse	United States	12 Feb 1995	World Cup	Sheffield, United Kingdom	
4	24.25		Chris Renaud	Canada	28 Feb 1997	CIAU Championships	St. Catharines, Canada	
5	24.13		Thomas Rupprath	Germany	11 December 1998	European 25m Championships	Sheffield, United Kingdom	
5	24.13	=	Matt Welsh	Australia	2 September 1999	Australia 25m Nationals	Canberra, Australia	
7	24.12		Neil Walker	United States	18 November 1999	World Cup	College Park, United States	
8	24.11		Matt Welsh	Australia	14 January 2000	World Cup	Hobart, Australia	
9	24.04	h	Neil Walker	United States	13 March 2000	World Championships	Athens, Greece	
10	23.42	sf	Neil Walker	United States	13 March 2000	World Championships	Athens, Greece	
11	23.31		Matt Welsh	Australia	2 Sep 2002	Australia 25m Nationals	Melbourne, Australia	
12	23.27		Thomas Rupprath	Germany	10 Dec 2004	European 25m Championships	Vienna, Austria	
13	23.24		Robert Hurley	Australia	26 Oct 2008	World Cup	Sydney, Australia	
14	23.05		Peter Marshall	United States	12 Nov 2008	World Cup	Stockholm, Sweden	
15	22.87		Randall Bal	United States	16 Nov 2008	World Cup	Berlin, Germany	
16	22.75		Peter Marshall	United States	17 October 2009	World Cup	Durban, South Africa	
17	22.73		Peter Marshall	United States	11 November 2009	World Cup	Stockholm, Sweden	
18	22.61		Peter Marshall	United States	22 November 2009	World Cup	Singapore	
19	22.22		Florent Manaudou	France	6 December 2014	World Championships	Doha, Qatar	
20	22.11		Kliment Kolesnikov	Russia	23 November 2022	Solidarity Games	Kazan, Russia	
21	22.09		Pieter Coetze	South Africa	9 October 2026	World Cup	Tashkent, Uzbekistan	
22	22.03	r, #	Xu Jiayu	China	24 October 2026	Chinese National Championships	Beijing, China	

Legend: # – Record awaiting ratification by FINA; e – equalled existing record;
Records not set in finals: h – heat; sf – semifinal; r – relay 1st leg; rh – relay heat 1st leg; b – B final; † – en route to final mark; so – swim-off; tt – time trial

=== Women long course ===
#	Time		Name	Nationality	Date	Meet	Location	Ref
1	29.00		Sandra Völker	Germany	24 May 1997	Mare Nostrum	Monte Carlo, Monaco	
2	28.78	sf	Sandra Völker	Germany	12 Jun 1999	Mare Nostrum	Monte Carlo, Monaco	
3	28.71		Sandra Völker	Germany	1 Aug 1999	European Championships	Istanbul, Turkey	
4	28.69		Nina Zhivanevskaya	Spain	8 April 2000	Spanish Spring Nationals	Madrid, Spain	
5	28.67		Mai Nakamura	Japan	25 April 2000	Japanese Championships	Tokyo, Japan	
6	28.25	h	Sandra Völker	Germany	17 Jun 2000	German Championships	Berlin, Germany	
7	28.19		Janine Pietsch	Germany	25 May 2005	German Championships	Berlin, Germany	
8	28.16	sf	Leila Vaziri	United States	28 Mar 2007	World Championships	Melbourne, Australia	
8	28.16	=	Leila Vaziri	United States	29 Mar 2007	World Championships	Melbourne, Australia	
10	28.09		Li Yang	China	19 Oct 2007	World Military Games	Hyderabad, India	
11	28.00	r	Hayley McGregory	United States	7 Mar 2008	Texas Senior Circuit Championships	Austin, United States	
12	27.95	sf	Emily Seebohm	Australia	22 March 2008	Australian Championships	Sydney, Australia	
13	27.67		Sophie Edington	Australia	23 March 2008	Australian Championships	Sydney, Australia	
13	27.67	=	Zhao Jing	China	9 April 2009	Chinese National Championships	Shaoxing, China	
15	27.61		Daniela Samulski	Germany	26 Jun 2009	German Championships	Berlin, Germany	
16	27.39	sf	Daniela Samulski	Germany	29 Jul 2009	World Championships	Rome, Italy	
17	27.38	sf	Anastasia Zuyeva	Russia	29 Jul 2009	World Championships	Rome, Italy	
18	27.06		Zhao Jing	China	30 Jul 2009	World Championships	Rome, Italy	
19	26.98		Liu Xiang	China	21 Aug 2018	Asian Games	Jakarta, Indonesia	
20	26.86		Kaylee McKeown	Australia	20 October 2023	World Cup	Budapest, Hungary	
21	26.63	sf	Sara Curtis	Italy	12 August 2026	European Championships	Paris, France	
22	26.56		Sara Curtis	Italy	13 August 2026	European Championships	Paris, France	

Legend: # – Record awaiting ratification by FINA; e – equalled existing record;
Records not set in finals: h – heat; sf – semifinal; r – relay 1st leg; rh – relay heat 1st leg; b – B final; † – en route to final mark; so – swim-off; tt – time trial

=== Women short course ===
#	Time		Name	Nationality	Date	Meet	Location	Ref
WB	28.47		Lei Xue	China	9 January 1993	World Cup	Beijing, China	
1	28.33		Sandra Völker	Germany	16 February 1993	World Cup	Sheffield, Great Britain	
2	27.64		Xiuyu Bai	China	13 March 1994	World Cup	Desenzano, Italy	
3	27.27		Sandra Völker	Germany	13 December 1998	European Championships	Sheffield, United Kingdom	
4	27.25	r	Haley Cope	United States	18 March 2000	NCAA Division I Championships	Indianapolis, United States	
5	26.83		Li Hui	China	2 December 2001	World Cup	Shanghai, China	
6	26.50		Sanja Jovanović	Croatia	15 December 2007	European Championships	Debrecen, Hungary	
7	26.37		Sanja Jovanović	Croatia	13 April 2008	World Championships	Manchester, United Kingdom	
8	26.23		Sanja Jovanović	Croatia	13 December 2008	European Championships	Rijeka, Croatia	
9	26.17		Marieke Guehrer	Australia	6 November 2009	World Cup	Moscow, Russia	
10	26.08	h	Zhao Jing	China	10 November 2009	World Cup	Stockholm, Sweden	
11	25.82		Zhao Jing	China	10 November 2009	World Cup	Stockholm, Sweden	
12	25.70		Sanja Jovanović	Croatia	12 December 2009	European Championships	Istanbul, Turkey	
13	25.67		Etiene Medeiros	Brazil	7 December 2014	World Championships	Doha, Qatar	
14	25.60		Kira Toussaint	Netherlands	14 November 2020	International Swimming League	Budapest, Hungary	
14	25.60	e	Kira Toussaint	Netherlands	18 December 2020	Amsterdam Christmas Meet	Amsterdam, Netherlands	
16	25.27		Maggie Mac Neil	Canada	20 December 2021	World Championships	Abu Dhabi, United Arab Emirates	
17	25.25		Maggie Mac Neil	Canada	16 December 2022	World Championships	Melbourne, Australia	
18	25.23		Regan Smith	United States	13 December 2024	World Championships	Budapest, Hungary	
19	25.21	#	Katharine Berkoff	United States	29 October 2026	US Short Course World Championship Trials	Westmont, United States	

Legend: # – Record awaiting ratification by FINA; e – equalled existing record;
Records not set in finals: h – heat; sf – semifinal; r – relay 1st leg; rh – relay heat 1st leg; b – B final; † – en route to final mark; so – swim-off; tt – time trial

== All-time top 25 ==
Tables show data for two definitions of "Top 25" - the top 25 50 m backstroke times and the top 25 athletes:
- denotes top performance for athletes in the top 25 50 m backstroke times
- denotes lesser performances, still in the top 25 50 m backstroke times, by repeat athletes
- denotes top performance (only) for other top 25 athletes who fall outside the top 25 50 m backstroke times

=== Men long course ===
- Correct as of September 2026

Ath.#	Perf.#	Time	Athlete	Nation	Date	Place	Ref.
1	1	23.55	Kliment Kolesnikov	Russia	27 July 2023	Kazan	
	2	23.68	Kolesnikov #2		28 July 2023	Kazan	
	2	23.68	Kolesnikov #3		3 August 2025	Singapore	
2	4	23.71	Hunter Armstrong	United States	28 April 2022	Greensboro	
	5	23.80	Kolesnikov #4		18 May 2021	Budapest	
	6	23.86	Kolesnikov #5		7 June 2026	Kazan	
	7	23.90	Kolesnikov #6		26 July 2024	Yekaterinburg	
	7	23.90	Kolesnikov #7		16 April 2025	Kazan	
3	9	23.92	Justin Ress	United States	28 April 2022	Greensboro	
3	9	23.92	Xu Jiayu	China	17 June 2026	Hangzhou	
	11	23.93	Kolesnikov #8		17 May 2021	Budapest	
	12	23.96	Kolesnikov #9		17 April 2024	Kazan	
	13	24.00	Kolesnikov #10		4 August 2018	Glasgow	
5	13	24.00	Shaine Casas	United States	28 April 2022	Greensboro	
	15	24.01	Armstrong #2		28 April 2022	Greensboro	
6	15	24.01	Pavel Samusenko	Russia	16 April 2025	Kazan	
	17	24.03	Samusenko #2		13 August 2026	Paris	
7	18	24.04	Liam Tancock	Great Britain	2 August 2009	Rome	
	18	24.04	Xu #2		21 September 2026	Tokyo	
	20	24.05	Ress #2		28 April 2022	Greensboro	
	20	24.05	Armstrong #3		30 July 2023	Fukuoka	
8	22	24.07	Camille Lacourt	France	12 August 2010	Budapest	
	23	24.08	Tancock #2		1 August 2009	Rome	
	23	24.08	Kolesnikov #11		3 April 2021	Kazan	
	23	24.08	Kolesnikov #12		2 August 2025	Singapore	
9		24.11	Miroslav Knedla	Czech Republic	14 August 2026	Paris	
10		24.12	Robert Glință	Romania	3 August 2018	Glasgow	
10		24.12	Isaac Cooper	Australia	17 February 2024	Doha	
12		24.15	Apostolos Christou	Greece	14 August 2026	Paris	
13		24.17	Pieter Coetze	South Africa	3 August 2025	Singapore	
14		24.23	Mark Nikolaev	Russia	11 April 2019	Kazan	
15		24.24	Junya Koga	Japan	2 August 2009	Rome	
15		24.24	Ryan Murphy	United States	27 July 2018	Irvine	
17		24.28	Miron Lifintsev	Russia	7 August 2024	Debrecen	
18		24.29	Vladimir Morozov	Russia	3 August 2018	Glasgow	
19		24.32	Shane Ryan	Ireland	3 August 2018	Glasgow	
20		24.33	Randall Bal	United States	5 December 2008	Eindhoven	
21		24.34	Johannes Zandberg	South Africa	2 August 2009	Rome	
21		24.34	Quintin McCarty	United States	5 June 2025	Indianapolis	
23		24.36	Oliver Morgan	Great Britain	17 April 2026	London	
24		24.38	Michele Lamberti	Italy	14 April 2026	Riccione	
25		24.39	Michael Andrew	United States	21 June 2019	Rome	

=== Men short course ===
- Correct as of October 2026

Ath.#	Perf.#	Time	Athlete	Nation	Date	Place	Ref.
1	1	22.03	Xu Jiayu	China	24 October 2026	Beijing	
2	2	22.09	Pieter Coetze	South Africa	9 October 2026	Tashkent	
3	3	22.11	Kliment Kolesnikov	Russia	23 November 2022	Kazan	
4	4	22.22	Florent Manaudou	France	6 December 2014	Doha	
5	5	22.23	Egor Kornev	Russia	2 October 2026	Baku	
	6	22.29	Kornev #2		9 October 2026	Tashkent	
	7	22.30	Xu #2		25 October 2026	Beijing	
	8	22.31	Kolesnikov #2		22 November 2022	Kazan	
	9	22.34	Xu #3		26 October 2026	Beijing	
6	10	22.35	Pavel Samusenko	Russia	9 October 2026	Tashkent	
	11	22.36	Coetze #2		17 October 2026	Astana	
	12	22.37	Samusenko #2		20 December 2025	Saint Petersburg	
	13	22.42	Kolesnikov #3		16 December 2023	Saint Petersburg	
	14	22.43	Kolesnikov #4		10 November 2025	Kazan	
	15	22.44	Kornev #3		20 December 2025	Saint Petersburg	
	16	22.47	Kolesnikov #5		3 November 2021	Kazan	
7	16	22.47	Miron Lifintsev	Russia	13 December 2024	Budapest	
8	18	22.49	Mark Nikolaev	Russia	28 December 2021	Saint Petersburg	
8	18	22.49	Isaac Cooper	Australia	13 December 2024	Budapest	
	18	22.49	Samusenko #3		17 October 2026	Astana	
	21	22.51	Samusenko #4		2 October 2026	Baku	
	21	22.51	Coetze #3		2 October 2026	Baku	
	23	22.52	Cooper #2		15 December 2022	Melbourne	
	23	22.52	Kornev #4		10 November 2025	Kazan	
10	25	22.53	Ryan Murphy	United States	25 November 2021	Eindhoven	
	25	22.53	Cooper #3		1 October 2026	Sydney	
11		22.55	Guilherme Guido	Brazil	26 October 2019	Budapest	
12		22.56	Shane Ryan	Ireland	13 December 2024	Budapest	
13		22.58	Evgeny Rylov	Russia	14 December 2018	Hangzhou	
14		22.60	Jordan Crooks	Cayman Islands	16 October 2026	Charlottesville	
15		22.61	Peter Marshall	United States	22 November 2009	Singapore	
15		22.61	Coleman Stewart	United States	28 August 2021	Naples	
17		22.62	Michele Lamberti	Italy	3 November 2021	Kazan	
18		22.63	Ralf Tribuntsov	Estonia	6 December 2025	Lublin	
19		22.64	Hubert Kós	Hungary	13 December 2024	Budapest	
20		22.65	Lorenzo Mora	Italy	17 December 2022	Melbourne	
21		22.68	Kacper Stokowski	Poland	13 December 2024	Budapest	
22		22.69	Miroslav Knedla	Czech Republic	7 December 2025	Lublin	
23		22.71	Adam Chaney	United States	30 October 2026	Westmont	
24		22.72	Dylan Carter	Trinidad and Tobago	4 November 2022	Indianapolis	
25		22.73	Thierry Bollin	Switzerland	12 December 2024	Budapest	

==== Notes ====
- Pavel Samusenko also swam 22.26, leading off the National Team squad’s mixed 4×50 medley relay final at the 2025 Vladimir Salnikov Cup.

=== Women long course ===
- Correct as of August 2026

Ath.#	Perf.#	Time	Athlete	Nation	Date	Place	Ref.
1	1	26.56	Sara Curtis	Italy	13 August 2026	Paris	
	2	26.63	Curtis #2		12 August 2026	Paris	
2	3	26.86	Kaylee McKeown	Australia	20 October 2023	Budapest	
3	4	26.90	Katharine Berkoff	United States	13 August 2026	Irvine	
4	5	26.91	Alina Gaifutdinova	Russia	12 August 2026	Paris	
	6	26.97	Berkoff #2		5 June 2025	Indianapolis	
5	7	26.98	Liu Xiang	China	21 August 2018	Jakarta	
	7	26.98	McKeown #2		9 December 2023	Brisbane	
	7	26.98	Berkoff #3		18 June 2026	Indianapolis	
	10	27.02	McKeown #3		13 October 2023	Athens	
	11	27.04	Berkoff #4		13 August 2026	Irvine	
	12	27.05	Berkoff #5		18 June 2026	Indianapolis	
6	13	27.06	Zhao Jing	China	30 July 2009	Rome	
6	13	27.06	Mary-Ambre Moluh	France	13 August 2026	Paris	
	13	27.06	McKeown #4		23 March 2025	Sydney	
	16	27.07	McKeown #5		18 April 2024	Gold Coast	
	16	27.07	Curtis #3		26 June 2026	Rome	
	18	27.08	McKeown #6		27 July 2023	Fukuoka	
	18	27.08	Berkoff #6		31 July 2025	Singapore	
8	20	27.09	Wan Letian	China	23 March 2025	Qingdao	
8	20	27.09	Isabelle Stadden	United States	30 July 2026	Irvine	
10	22	27.10	Kira Toussaint	Netherlands	10 April 2021	Eindhoven	
10	22	27.10	Regan Smith	United States	26 July 2023	Fukuoka	
12	24	27.11	Fu Yuanhui	China	6 August 2015	Kazan	
	24	27.11	Smith #2		27 July 2023	Fukuoka	
13		27.13	Kylie Masse	Canada	1 May 2025	Fort Lauderdale	
14		27.14	Etiene Medeiros	Brazil	27 July 2017	Budapest	
15		27.15	Lauren Cox	Great Britain	24 May 2025	London	
15		27.15	Lauren Cox	Great Britain	12 August 2026	Paris	
16		27.16	Mollie O'Callaghan	Australia	18 April 2024	Gold Coast	
16		27.16	Marrit Steenbergen	Netherlands	13 August 2026	Paris	
18		27.19	Kathleen Dawson	Great Britain	18 May 2021	Budapest	
19		27.21	Georgia Davies	Great Britain	4 August 2018	Glasgow	
20		27.23	Daniela Samulski	Germany	30 July 2009	Rome	
20		27.23	Aliaksandra Herasimenia	Belarus	27 July 2017	Budapest	
20		27.23	Anastasia Fesikova	Russia	4 August 2018	Glasgow	
23		27.24	Claire Curzan	United States	5 June 2025	Indianapolis	
24		27.26	Tessa Giele	Netherlands	13 August 2026	Paris	
25		27.27	Analia Pigrée	France	14 August 2022	Rome	

=== Women short course ===
- Correct as of October 2026

Ath.#	Perf.#	Time	Athlete	Nation	Date	Place	Ref.
1	1	25.21	Katharine Berkoff	United States	29 October 2026	Westmont	
2	2	25.23	Regan Smith	United States	13 December 2024	Budapest	
3	3	25.25	Maggie Mac Neil	Canada	16 December 2022	Melbourne	
4	4	25.26	Claire Curzan	United States	29 October 2026	Westmont	
	5	25.27	Mac Neil #2		20 December 2021	Abu Dhabi	
5	6	25.35	Kaylee McKeown	Australia	23 October 2025	Toronto	
	7	25.36	McKeown #2		18 October 2024	Shanghai	
6	8	25.37	Gretchen Walsh	United States	18 October 2024	Charlottesville	
	9	25.40	McKeown #3		28 September 2024	Adelaide	
	9	25.40	Walsh #2		23 October 2025	Toronto	
	11	25.42	McKeown #4		10 October 2025	Carmel	
7	11	25.42	Mollie O'Callaghan	Australia	23 October 2025	Toronto	
	13	25.43	Curzan #2		16 October 2026	Charlottesville	
	13	25.43	Berkoff #2		16 October 2026	Charlottesville	
8	15	25.47	Marrit Steenbergen	Netherlands	7 December 2025	Lublin	
	16	25.48	Smith #2		31 October 2024	Singapore	
	17	25.49	O'Callaghan #2		17 December 2022	Melbourne	
9	17	25.49	Sara Curtis	Italy	7 December 2025	Lublin	
	19	25.50	Berkoff #3		29 October 2026	Westmont	
	20	25.51	Berkoff #4		12 December 2024	Budapest	
	21	25.54	Curzan #2		16 December 2022	Melbourne	
10	22	25.60	Kira Toussaint	Netherlands	14 November 2020	Budapest	
10	22	25.60	Kira Toussaint	Netherlands	18 December 2020	Amsterdam	
10	22	25.60	Maria Kameneva	Russia	24 November 2022	Kazan	
	22	25.60	Curzan #3		15 December 2022	Melbourne	
12		25.62	Kylie Masse	Canada	20 December 2021	Abu Dhabi	
13		25.67	Etiene Medeiros	Brazil	4 December 2014	Doha	
14		25.70	Sanja Jovanović	Croatia	12 December 2009	Istanbul	
14		25.70	Olivia Smoliga	United States	29 October 2026	Westmont	
16		25.81	Minna Atherton	Australia	26 October 2019	Budapest	
16		25.81	Ingrid Wilm	Canada	12 December 2024	Budapest	
16		25.81	Isabelle Stadden	United States	29 October 2026	Westmont	
19		25.82	Zhao Jing	China	10 November 2009	Stockholm	
20		25.83	Emily Seebohm	Australia	7 December 2014	Doha	
20		25.83	Louise Hansson	Sweden	19 December 2021	Abu Dhabi	
20		25.83	Celia Pulido Ortíz	Mexico	10 October 2025	Carmel	
23		25.85	Julie Kepp Jensen	Denmark	15 December 2022	Melbourne	
24		25.88	Iona Anderson	Australia	1 October 2026	Sydney	
25		25.92	Gao Chang	China	27 February 2010	Tokyo	

== World champions (long course) ==
=== Men ===
Edition	Winner	Time	Notes	Ref.
(Japan) Fukuoka 2001	Randall Bal (USA)	25.34	(Note: Thomas Rupprath set a championship record of 25.31 in the semifinals.)	
(Spain) Barcelona 2003	Thomas Rupprath (GER)	24.80	WR	
(Canada) Montreal 2005	Aristeidis Grigoriadis (GRE)	24.95		
(Australia) Melbourne 2007	Gerhard Zandberg (RSA)	24.98		
(Italy) Rome 2009	Liam Tancock (GBR)	24.04	WR	
(China) Shanghai 2011	Liam Tancock (GBR)	24.50		
(Spain) Barcelona 2013	Camille Lacourt (FRA)	24.42		
(Russia) Kazan 2015	Camille Lacourt (FRA)	24.23		
(Hungary) Budapest 2017	Camille Lacourt (FRA)	24.35		
(South Korea) Gwangju 2019	Zane Waddell (RSA)	24.43		
(Hungary) Budapest 2022	Justin Ress (USA)	24.12		
(Japan) Fukuoka 2023	Hunter Armstrong (USA)	24.05		
(Qatar) Doha 2024	Isaac Cooper (AUS)	24.13		
Singapore 2025	Kliment Kolesnikov (NAB)	23.68	CR	

=== Women ===
Edition	Winner	Time	Notes	Ref.
(Japan) Fukuoka 2001	Haley Cope (USA)	28.51	(Note: Natalie Coughlin set a championship record of 28.49 in the semifinals.)	
(Spain) Barcelona 2003	Nina Zhivanevskaya (ESP)	28.48	CR	
(Canada) Montreal 2005	Giaan Rooney (AUS)	28.63	(Note: Gao Chang set a championship record of 28.31 in the semifinals.)	
(Australia) Melbourne 2007	Leila Vaziri (USA)	28.16	=WR	
(Italy) Rome 2009	Zhao Jing (CHN)	27.06	WR	
(China) Shanghai 2011	Anastasia Zuyeva (RUS)	27.79		
(Spain) Barcelona 2013	Zhao Jing (CHN)	27.29		
(Russia) Kazan 2015	Fu Yuanhui (CHN)	27.11		
(Hungary) Budapest 2017	Etiene Medeiros (BRA)	27.14		
(South Korea) Gwangju 2019	Olivia Smoliga (USA)	27.33		
(Hungary) Budapest 2022	Kylie Masse (CAN)	27.31		
(Japan) Fukuoka 2023	Kaylee McKeown (AUS)	27.08		
(Qatar) Doha 2024	Claire Curzan (USA)	27.43		
Singapore 2025	Katharine Berkoff (USA)	27.08		

== World champions (short course) ==
=== Men ===
Edition	Winner	Time	Notes	Ref.
Hong Kong 1999	Rodolfo Falcón (CUB)	24.34	CR	
(Greece) Athens 2000	Neil Walker (USA)	23.99	(Note: Neil Walker set a world record of 23.42 in the semifinals.)	
(Russia) Moscow 2002	Matt Welsh (AUS)	23.66		
(United States) Indianapolis 2004	Thomas Rupprath (GER)	23.51		
(China) Shanghai 2006	Matt Welsh (AUS)	23.53		
(United Kingdom) Manchester 2008	Peter Marshall (USA)	23.49	(Note: Liam Tancock set a championship record of 23.41 in the semifinals.)	
(United Arab Emirates) Dubai 2010	Stanislav Donets (RUS)	22.93	CR	
(Turkey) Istanbul 2012	Robert Hurley (AUS)	23.04		
(Qatar) Doha 2014	Florent Manaudou (FRA)	22.22	WR	
(Canada) Windsor 2016	Junya Koga (JPN)	22.85		
(China) Hangzhou 2018	Evgeny Rylov (RUS)	22.58		
(United Arab Emirates) Abu Dhabi 2021	Kliment Kolesnikov (RSF)	22.66		
(Australia) Melbourne 2022	Ryan Murphy (USA)	22.64		
(Hungary) Budapest 2024	Miron Lifintsev (NAB)	22.47		

=== Women ===
Edition	Winner	Time	Notes	Ref.
Hong Kong 1999	Sandra Völker (GER)	27.63	CR	
(Greece) Athens 2000	Antje Buschschulte (GER)	27.90		
(Russia) Moscow 2002	Jennifer Carroll (CAN)	27.38	CR	
(United States) Indianapolis 2004	Haley Cope (USA)	27.49	(Note: Haley Cope set a championship record of 27.14 in the semifinals.)	
(China) Shanghai 2006	Janine Pietsch (GER)	27.00	CR	
(United Kingdom) Manchester 2008	Sanja Jovanović (CRO)	26.37	WR	
(United Arab Emirates) Dubai 2010	Zhao Jing (CHN)	26.27	CR	
(Turkey) Istanbul 2012	Zhao Jing (CHN)	25.95	CR	
(Qatar) Doha 2014	Etiene Medeiros (BRA)	25.67	WR	
(Canada) Windsor 2016	Etiene Medeiros (BRA)	25.82		
(China) Hangzhou 2018	Olivia Smoliga (USA)	25.88		
(United Arab Emirates) Abu Dhabi 2021	Maggie Mac Neil (CAN)	25.27	WR	
(Australia) Melbourne 2022	Maggie Mac Neil (CAN)	25.25	WR	
(Hungary) Budapest 2024	Regan Smith (USA)	25.23	WR	
