= Leila Vaziri =

American swimmer

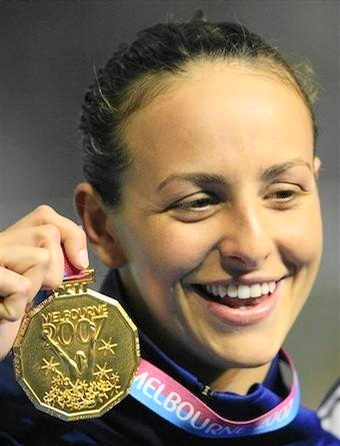
- Vaziri at 2007 world championships

Personal information
- Full name: Leila Vaziri
- Nickname: "Lei"
- National team: United States
- Born: June 6, 1985 (age 41) New York, New York, U.S.
- Height: 5 ft 6 in (1.68 m)

Sport
- Sport: Swimming
- Strokes: Backstroke
- Club: Coral Springs Swim Club
- College team: Indiana University
Medal record
Women's swimming
Representing the United States
World Championships (LC)
Gold medal – first place	2007 Melbourne	50 m backstroke
Silver medal – second place	2007 Melbourne	4×100 m medley

Leila Vaziri (Persian: لیلا وزیری, born June 6, 1985) is an American competition swimmer, the 2007 world champion, and a former world record-holder in the 50-meter backstroke.

== Swimming career ==
=== Collegiate career ===
Vaziri attended Indiana University, where she majored in communication and culture, and competed for the Indiana Hoosiers swimming and diving team. She was 2005 Big Ten Champion in the 100-yard backstroke and the 2007 NCAA bronze medalist in the 100-yard backstroke. Vaziri earned 15 All-America certificates during her Hoosier career, the most in school history, and was the 2007 Indiana University Female Athlete of the Year.

Leila won the 100-meter backstroke at the US National Championships in 2006, earning a spot at the Pan Pacific Championships in Victoria, British Columbia. After turning in the second-fastest time in the nation, she earning a spot on the U.S. World Championship Team.

=== Professional career ===
At the 2007 World Aquatics Championships held in Melbourne, Vaziri won a gold medal in the 50-meter backstroke and earned a silver medal by swimming the backstroke leg in the heats of the 4×100-meter medley relay. Going into the final of the 50 m backstroke, Vaziri was the clear favorite for gold. In the heats of the 50 m backstroke, Vaziri broke Natalie Coughlin's Championship record of 28.30 with a time of 28.25 establishing a new American Record. In the semifinals of the 50 m backstroke, she broke Janine Pietsch's world record of 28.19 with a time of 28.16. In the final of the 50 m backstroke, she equalled her own world record en route to winning gold.

Vaziri came short of making the 2008 USA Olympic Swimming Team when she finished in 7th place in the final of the 100 m backstroke at the 2008 U.S. Olympic Team Trials.

== Personal ==
She has an Iranian father and a mother of German ancestry.

== See also ==
- List of Iranian Americans
- List of World Aquatics Championships medalists in swimming (women)
- World record progression 50 metres backstroke

Records
Preceded by Janine Pietsch	Women's 50-meter backstroke world record-holder (long course); March 28, 2007 – October 19, 2007	Succeeded by LI Yang
