= María Virginia Báez =

Paraguayan swimmer (born 1991)

Personal information
- Full name: María Virginia Báez Franco
- National team: Paraguay
- Born: 18 November 1991 (age 34) Asunción, Paraguay
- Height: 1.71 m (5 ft 7 in)
- Weight: 70 kg (154 lb)

Sport
- Sport: Swimming
- Strokes: Backstroke

María Virginia Báez Franco (born November 18, 1991) is a Paraguayan swimmer, who specialized in backstroke events. She has been selected to represent Paraguay at the 2008 Summer Olympics, placing among the top 48 swimmers in the women's 100 m backstroke.

Baez was invited by FINA to compete as a lone female swimmer for Paraguay in the 100 m backstroke at the 2008 Summer Olympics in Beijing. Swimming against Bermuda's Kiera Aitken and Panama's Christie Bodden in heat one, Baez tried to hold on with Aitken throughout the race, but could not catch her near the wall to finish only with a second-place time and establish a Paraguayan national record in 1:05.39. Baez, however, failed to advance into the semi-finals, as he placed forty-sixth overall in the prelims.
