= Margaret Hoelzer =

American swimmer

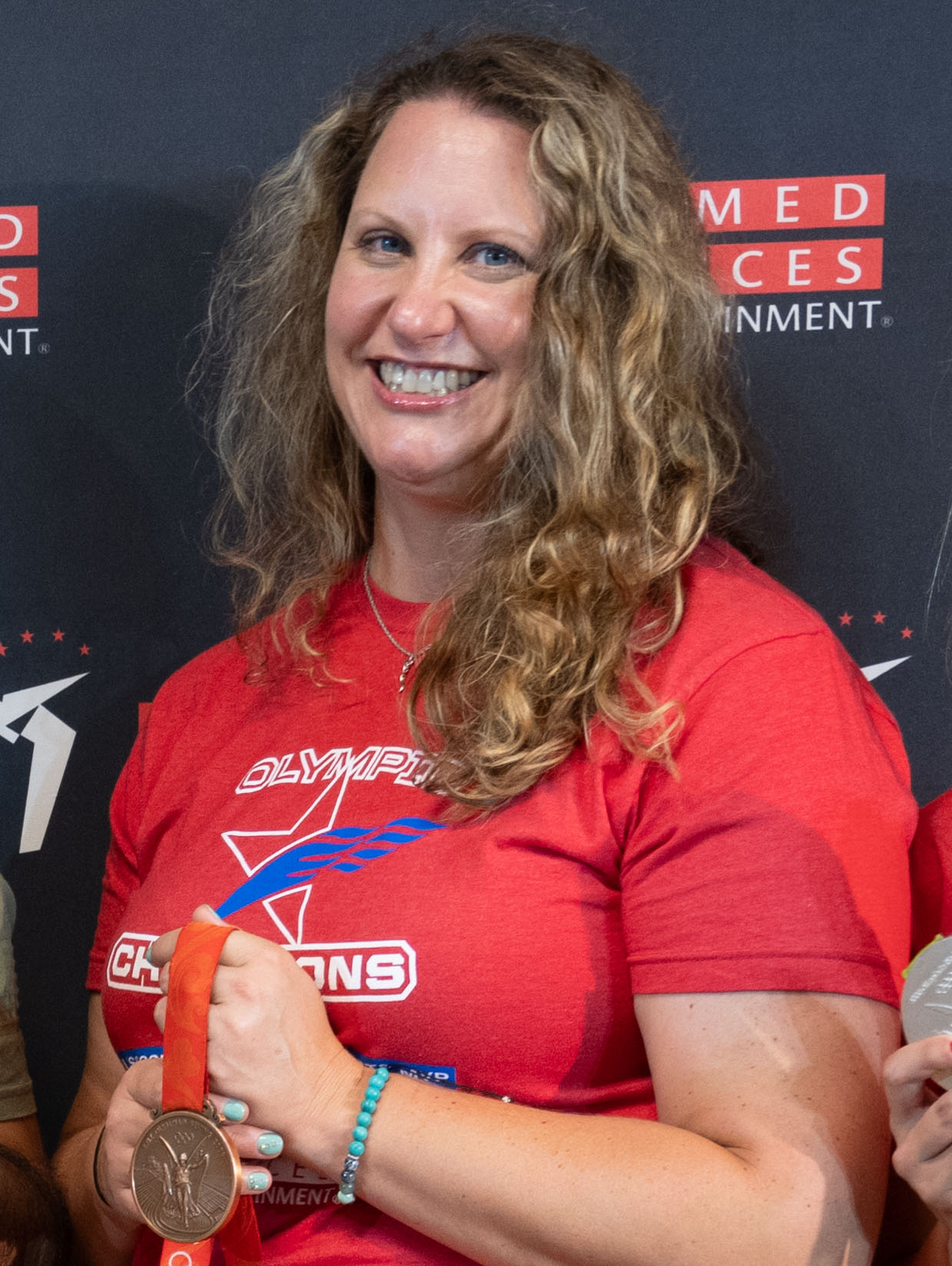
- Hoelzer in 2024

Personal information
- Full name: Margaret Josephine Hoelzer
- National team: United States
- Born: March 30, 1983 (age 43) Huntsville, Alabama, U.S.
- Height: 5 ft 11 in (180 cm)
- Weight: 174 lb (79 kg)

Sport
- Sport: Swimming
- Strokes: Backstroke, freestyle
- Club: FAST Swim Team
- College team: Auburn University
Medal record
Women's swimming
Representing the United States
Olympic Games
| Silver medal – second place | 2008 Beijing | 200 m backstroke |
| Silver medal – second place | 2008 Beijing | 4×100 m medley |
| Bronze medal – third place | 2008 Beijing | 100 m backstroke |
World Championships (LC)
| Gold medal – first place | 2003 Barcelona | 4×200 m freestyle |
| Gold medal – first place | 2007 Melbourne | 200 m backstroke |
| Gold medal – first place | 2007 Melbourne | 4×200 m freestyle |
| Silver medal – second place | 2003 Barcelona | 200 m backstroke |
| Silver medal – second place | 2005 Montreal | 200 m backstroke |
World Championships (SC)
| Gold medal – first place | 2004 Indianapolis | 200 m backstroke |
| Gold medal – first place | 2006 Shanghai | 200 m backstroke |
| Gold medal – first place | 2008 Manchester | 4×100 m medley |
| Silver medal – second place | 2006 Shanghai | 4×100 m medley |
| Bronze medal – third place | 2006 Shanghai | 4×200 m freestyle |
| Bronze medal – third place | 2008 Manchester | 200 m backstroke |
Pan Pacific Championships
| Gold medal – first place | 2002 Yokohama | 200 m backstroke |
| Silver medal – second place | 2006 Victoria | 200 m backstroke |

Margaret Josephine Hoelzer (born March 30, 1983) is an American former competition swimmer, Olympic medalist, and former world record-holder. Hoelzer competed in the 2004 Summer Olympics and the 2008 Olympic Games.

== Biography ==
While in Huntsville, Hoelzer swam in the summer for Jones Valley Recreation Association, and swam for her high school, Huntsville High School. She also coached for JVRA.

Hoelzer swam for the Auburn Tigers swimming and diving team while attending Auburn University, where she earned her degree in psychology with a minor in criminology. In 2007, Hoelzer moved to Charlotte, NC to train with Coach David Marsh and was sponsored by Speedo. In 2008, Hoelzer relocated to Seattle, Washington and then to Fullerton, California with coach Sean Hutchison to train at Fullerton Aquatics.

Her grandfather Helmut Hoelzer invented the first fully electronic analog computer and was a member of the Wernher von Braun Operation Paperclip team. Her sister Martha Hoelzer ran cross country and track for the University of Alabama and University of North Carolina at Chapel Hill.

== Swimming career ==
Hoelzer swam on the international stage consistently from 2002 to 2009 with a podium swim at every major international meet except the Olympics in 2004, where she placed 5th. According to SwimSwam magazine, she is considered one of the top 10 women swimmers who did not win an Olympic gold medal.

She was on the 1998 National Junior Team. She was a five-time National A Team member from (2002–06) and a member of the 2009-10 National Team. She was on the All-star Team from 2003-06.

She won the 200 back National in 2006 SUM and 2005 SPG.

At Auburn University, she was a six-time NCAA Champion, an SEC and NCAA record holder, and a 22-time All-American. During her tenure swimming for the Auburn Tigers, they won the NCAA National swimming title 3 years in 2002, 2003 and 2004.

At her high school, Huntsville High, she was an eight-time state champion and a 1999 Scholastic All-American.

=== 2002 Pan Pacific Games ===
2002: Gold, 200m BK

=== 2003 World Aquatics Championships ===
WORLD - 2 Final, 200m BK; 5 Semi, 200m BK.

=== 2004 Short Course Worlds ===
2004: Gold, 200m BK; Silver, 400m MR(pr)

=== 2004 Olympics ===
At the 2004 U.S. Olympic Trials, Hoelzer qualified to swim the 200-meter backstroke by placing first, with a time of 2:11.88. She also swam in the 100-meter backstroke, but did not qualify to swim that event at the Olympics.

In the 2004 Summer Olympics in Athens, Greece, she placed 5th in the 200-meter backstroke, with a time of 2:10.70.

=== 2005 World Aquatics Championships ===
WORLD - 2 Final, 200m BK.

=== 2006 Short Course Worlds ===
2006: Gold, 200m BK; Silver, 400m MR; Bronze, 800m FR-R(pr); t4, 400m FR-R; 6, 100m BK

=== 2006 Pan Pacifics ===
2006: Silver, 200m BK; 6, 100m BK

=== 2007 World Aquatics Championships ===
WORLD - 11 Semi, 50m BK; 1 Semi, 200m BK; 1 Final, 200m BK (American Record); 1 Final(pr), 800m FR-R.

=== 2008 Olympics ===
At the U.S. Trials on July 1, 2008, Hoelzer qualified to swim in the 100-meter backstroke at the 2008 Olympics. On July 5, 2008, Hoelzer broke her former Auburn University roommate Kirsty Coventry's world record of 2:06.39 in the 200-meter backstroke, with a time of 2:06.09, ultimately qualifying for her second event in the 2008 Olympics. This record was broken in Beijing by Coventry. She also qualified for the women's 4×100-meter medley relay.

Hoelzer won a bronze medal in the 100-meter backstroke on August 12 in Beijing. She also won the silver medal in the 200-meter backstroke on August 16, and the silver medal in the 4×100-meter medley relay on August 17 after swimming in the qualifying heats for that event.

=== 2008 Short Course Worlds ===
SC WORLDS - 14 Semi, 50m BK (SCM); 7 Semi, 100m BK (SCM); 6 Final, 100m BK (SCM); 100m BK (SCM); 3 Final, 200m BK (SCM); 14 Semi, 50m FL (SCM); 16 Semi, 100m FL (SCM); 1 Final, 400m MED-R (SCM) (WR)

=== 2009 Short Course National Championships ===
2009: 3, 200y BK; 4, 100y BK; 6, 100y FL

=== Duel in the Pool History ===
2009: Gold, 400m MR(WR); Silver, 100m BK & 200m BK(AR)

2005: Gold, 200m BK; Silver, 100m BK; 6, 200m FL

2003: Gold, 200m BK; Bronze, 100m BK

=== Olympic Trials History ===
2008: 1, 200m BK; 2, 100m BK

2004: 1, 200m BK; 8, 100m BK

=== U.S. Nationals History ===
3, 100m BK/200m BK

=== Records ===
Former WR holder in the 400m medley relay, set at the 2009 MOO Duel in the Pool

Former WR holder in 200m BK, set at 2008 Olympic Trials

Former WR holder in 400m MED- R (SCM), set at 2008 SC Worlds

Former AR in 200m BK, set at 2007 World Championships

== Personal life ==
Hoelzer has revealed that she was sexually abused as a child. She said she shared her story to prevent future incidents of sexual abuse. Hoelzer is the national spokesperson for the National Children's Advocacy Center, and has received the "Voice of Courage" award from the Darkness to Light organization.

== See also ==
- List of Auburn University people
- List of Olympic medalists in swimming (women)
- List of World Aquatics Championships medalists in swimming (women)
- World record progression 200 metres backstroke
- World record progression 4 × 100 metres medley relay

Records
| Preceded by Kirsty Coventry | Women's 200-meter backstroke world record-holder (long course); July 5, 2008 – August 16, 2008 | Succeeded by Kirsty Coventry |
