= Tayliah Zimmer =

Australian swimmer

Personal information
- Full name: Tayliah Zimmer
- Nickname: Tay
- Nationality: Australia
- Born: 24 May 1985 (age 41) Barham, Australia
- Height: 1.82 m (6 ft 0 in)
- Weight: 79 kg (174 lb)

Sport
- Sport: Swimming
- Strokes: Backstroke
- Club: Kingscliff / NSWIS
Medal record
Commonwealth Games
Bronze medal – third place	2006 Melbourne	50 m backstroke
World Championships (LC)
Bronze medal – third place	2007 Melbourne	50 m Backstroke
World Championships (SC)
Gold medal – first place	2006 Shanghai	4x100 m Medley Relay
Silver medal – second place	2004 Indianapolis	200 m Backstroke
Silver medal – second place	2006 Shanghai	50 m Backstroke
Silver medal – second place	2006 Shanghai	100 m Backstroke
Silver medal – second place	2006 Shanghai	200 m Backstroke

Tayliah Zimmer (born 24 May 1985 in Barham) is an Australian swimmer.

== See also ==
- List of World Aquatics Championships medalists in swimming (women)
- World record progression 4 × 100 metres medley relay
