= Reiko Nakamura =

Japanese swimmer (born 1982)

Personal information
- Full name: 中村 礼子
- Nationality: Japan
- Born: May 17, 1982 (age 44) Yokohama, Kanagawa Prefecture
- Height: 166 cm (5 ft 5 in)
- Weight: 53 kg (117 lb)

Sport
- Sport: Swimming
- Strokes: backstroke
Medal record
Women's swimming
Representing Japan
Olympic Games
Bronze medal – third place	2004 Athens	200 m backstroke
Bronze medal – third place	2008 Beijing	200 m backstroke
World Championships (LC)
Bronze medal – third place	2005 Montreal	200 m backstroke
Bronze medal – third place	2007 Melbourne	100 m backstroke
Bronze medal – third place	2007 Melbourne	200 m backstroke
World Championships (SC)
Silver medal – second place	2002 Moscow	200 m backstroke
Pan Pacific Championships
Gold medal – first place	2006 Victoria	200 m backstroke
Universiade
Gold medal – first place	2001 Beijing	200 m backstroke
Gold medal – first place	2003 Daegu	200 m backstroke
Silver medal – second place	2003 Daegu	100 m backstroke
Bronze medal – third place	2003 Daegu	4×100 m medley

Reiko Nakamura (中村 礼子, Nakamura Reiko; born May 17, 1982 in Yokohama, Kanagawa Prefecture) is a Japanese Olympic and Asian record-holding swimmer.

== Swimming career ==
Nakamura retired from swimming in 2008, after her final Olympic Games. At the time she retired, she was the current Asian record holder in both the 100 m and 200 m women’s backstroke disciplines.

=== Olympics ===
She swam in the 2004 and 2008 Olympic Games, winning the bronze medals in the 200m backstroke at both editions. In doing so, she became the first Japanese woman in 72 years to win medals at consecutive Olympic games. She retired shortly after achieving this, in October 2008.

=== Pan Pacific Championships ===
Nakamura won the gold medal in the 200 m backstroke at the 2006 Pan Pacific Championships held in Victoria, Canada. In doing so, she set a new Pan Pacific Championships record in the event, swimming 2:08.86. This beat the previous record of 2:10.02, set by her teammate Takami Igarashi earlier that same day in the qualifying heats.

== Records ==
=== World records ===
Nakamura held the Women’s 100-meter backstroke world record between March 4, 2001 and November 29, 2001.

She also held the Women’s 200-meter short course backstroke world record between February 23, 2008 and April 11, 2008. Nakamura claimed the record by swimming 2:03.24 at the Japan Open short course swimming championships, beating Natalie Coughlan’s previous record of 2:03.62 set in 2001.

=== Olympic records ===
At the 2008 Olympics, Nakamura set the Asian Records and Japanese Records in both the 100 and 200 backstrokes (59.36 and 2:07.13).

=== World Championship records ===
At the 2007 World Championships, she swam to a new Japanese Record in the 100 back (1:00.40) in finishing third. Eight days later, she lowered the mark to 1:00.29 in winning the 2007 Japan Championships.

=== Pan Pacific Championship records. ===
Nakamura set a new Pan Pacific Championships Women’s 200 m backstroke record of 2:08.86 during her gold medal winning swim at the 2006 Championships held in Victoria, Canada.

== See also ==
- World record progression 100 metres backstroke
- World record progression 200 metres backstroke

Records
Preceded by Angel Martino	Women's 100-meter backstroke world record-holder (short course); March 4, 2001 – November 29, 2001	Succeeded by Natalie Coughlin
Preceded by Natalie Coughlin	Women's 200-meter backstroke world record-holder (short course); February 23, 2008 – April 11, 2008	Succeeded by Kirsty Coventry
