= Escarlata Bernard =

Spanish swimmer

Personal information
- Full name: Victoria Escarlata Bernard
- Nationality: Spanish
- Born: 17 March 1989 (age 36); Las Palmas, Spain

Sport
- Sport: Swimming

Victoria Escarlata Bernard (born 17 March 1989 in Las Palmas) is a Spanish backstroke swimmer who competed in the 2008 Summer Olympics.
