= Esther Baron =

French swimmer (born 1987)

Personal information
- Born: 6 February 1987 (age 39) Cholet, France
- Height: 1.79 m (5 ft 10 in)
- Weight: 68 kg (150 lb)

Sport
- Sport: Swimming
- Club: EP Manosque; CN Melun-Dammarie (2004–2006); Canet 66 natation (2006–2008); CN Marseille (2008–2009)
Medal record
Representing France
European Championships (SC)
Gold medal – first place	2006 Helsinki	200 m backstroke
Silver medal – second place	2007 Debrecen	200 m backstroke
European Championships (LC)
Gold medal – first place	2006 Budapest	200 m backstroke
Mediterranean Games
Silver medal – second place	2005 Almeria	200 m backstroke

Esther Baron (born 6 February 1987) is a retired French swimmer. She had her best achievements in the 200 m backstroke event: gold medals in the European Championships of 2006, long course and short course, silver medal at the 2007 European Short Course Swimming Championships and fourth place at the 2007 World Aquatics Championships. While winning the short course championship in 2006 she set a new European record.

She retired from competitions in September 2009. After obtaining a diploma of sport educator she worked as a swimming coach for children at SP Manosque, the club where she learned swimming herself. She is also involved in local politics with the party of Christophe Castaner in Alpes-de-Haute-Provence.
