= Nikolett Szepesi =

Hungarian swimmer

Personal information
- Full name: Szepesi Nikolett
- Nationality: Hungary
- Born: September 11, 1987 (age 38) Budapest, Hungary
- Height: 1.72 m (5 ft 8 in)
- Weight: 60 kg (130 lb)

Sport
- Sport: Swimming
- Strokes: Backstroke
- Club: Kőbánya SC
Medal record
Women's swimming
Representing Hungary
European Championships (LC)
Bronze medal – third place	2008 Eindhoven	200 m backstroke

Nikolett Szepesi (born September 11, 1987) is a Hungarian swimmer from Budapest.

== Biography ==
In 2010, she was suspended for one year due to doping/retirement rule violation.

== Awards ==
- Hungarian swimmer of the Year (1): 2007
