= Zhao Jing (swimmer) =

Chinese swimmer (born 1990)

Personal information
- Full name: Zhao Jing
- National team: China
- Born: December 31, 1990 (age 35) Wuhan, Hubei
- Height: 1.76 m (5 ft 9 in)
- Weight: 59 kg (130 lb)

Sport
- Sport: Swimming
- Strokes: Backstroke, medley
- Club: Zhejiang
Medal record
Women's swimming
Representing China
Olympic Games
Bronze medal – third place	2008 Beijing	4×100 m medley
World Championships (LC)
Gold medal – first place	2009 Rome	50 m backstroke
Gold medal – first place	2009 Rome	4×100 m medley
Gold medal – first place	2011 Shanghai	100 m backstroke
Gold medal – first place	2013 Barcelona	50 m backstroke
Silver medal – second place	2011 Shanghai	4×100 m medley
World Championships (SC)
Gold medal – first place	2010 Dubai	4×100 m medley
Gold medal – first place	2010 Dubai	50 m backstroke
Gold medal – first place	2012 Istanbul	50 m backstroke
Silver medal – second place	2010 Dubai	100 m backstroke
Bronze medal – third place	2012 Istanbul	100 m medley

Zhao Jing (simplified Chinese: 赵菁; traditional Chinese: 趙菁; pinyin: Zhào Jīng; born December 31, 1990) is a Chinese former competitive swimmer, backstroke specialist, and world record-holder. Zhao swam at the 2008 Summer Olympics and 2012 Summer Olympics, winning a bronze medal in the women's 4x100-meter medley relay in 2008. She has also won gold medals as a member of Chinese teams at the 2009, 2011 and 2013 World Aquatics Championships, and the 2010 short course world championships. She also won individual world titles in the 50-meter backstroke in 2009, 2010, 2012 and 2013, and the 100-meter backstroke in 2011.

== Records ==
- 2006 Asian Championships – 28.50, 50 m back (AR)
- 2008 National Champions Tournament & Olympic Selective Trials – 59.81, 100 m back (AR)
- 2009 FINA World Championships – 3.52.19, 4×100 m medley relay
- 2009 FINA World Cup Stockholm – 26.08 50 m backstroke short course world record

== See also ==
- World record progression 50 metres backstroke

Records
Preceded by Anastasia Zuyeva	World record holder Women's 50 m backstroke (long course); 30 July 2009 – 21 August 2018	Succeeded by Liu Xiang
Preceded by Marieke Guehrer	World record holder Women's 50 m backstroke (short course); 10 November – 12 December 2009	Succeeded by Sanja Jovanović
