= Eadie =

Eadie may refer to:

- Eadie (surname)
- Eadie (given name)
- Eadie (automobile), a brand of car manufactured in the United Kingdom between 1898 and 1901.
- Eadie Island, one of the South Shetland Islands in Antarctica
- Eadie–Hofstee diagram, a graphical representation of enzyme kinetics
- Eadie Was a Lady, a 1945 American musical comedy
- National Bank of New Zealand Ltd v Eadie, a case in New Zealand
