= Swimming at the 2005 World Aquatics Championships – Women's 200 metre freestyle =

Women's 200m Freestyle at the 2005 FINA World Aquatics Championships
- Dates: 26 July (heats, semifinals); 27 July (final)
- Competitors: 62
- Winning time: 1 minutes 58.60 seconds

Medalists
gold medal	Solenne Figues	France
silver medal	Federica Pellegrini	Italy
bronze medal	Yang Yu	China
bronze medal	Josefin Lillhage	Sweden

The Women's 200 Freestyle at the 11th FINA World Aquatics Championships was swum 26 and 27 July 2005 in Montreal, Quebec, Canada. On 26 July, preliminary heats and semifinals occurred, and on 27 July a final heat was swum in the evening. 64 swimmers were entered in the event, of which 62 swam in one of 8 heats. The top-16 swimmers from the preliminary heats advanced on to semifinals; the top-8 swimmers in the two semifinals heats advanced onto the next night's final.

The existing records at the start of the event were:

- World record (WR): 1:56.64, Franziska van Almsick (Germany), 3 August 2002 in Berlin, Germany.
- Championship record (CR): 1:56.78, Franziska van Almsick (Germany), 6 September 1994 in Rome, Italy.

== Results ==
=== Final ===
Place	Name	Nationality	Time	Note
1	Solenne Figues	France	1:58.60	
2	Federica Pellegrini	Italy	1:58.73	
3	Yang Yu	China	1:59.08	
3	Josefin Lillhage	Sweden	1:59.08	
5	Sara Isakovič	Slovenia	1:59.23	
6	Paulina Barzycka	Poland	1:59.34	
7	Melanie Marshall	Great Britain	1:59.36	
8	Linda Mackenzie	Australia	2:00.02	

=== Semifinals ===
Rank	Name	Nationality	Time	Note
1	Solenne Figues	France	1:58.75	Q
2	Sara Isakovič	Slovenia	1:58.79	Q
3	Federica Pellegrini	Italy	1:58.82	Q
4	Melanie Marshall	Great Britain	1:58.86	Q
5	Linda Mackenzie	Australia	1:59.00	Q
6	Paulina Barzycka	Poland	1:59.18	Q
7	Yang Yu	China	1:59.31	Q
8	Josefin Lillhage	Sweden	1:59.35	Q
9	Katie Hoff	USA	1:59.36	
10	Whitney Myers	USA	1:59.38	
11	Camelia Potec	Romania	1:59.41	
12	Claudia Poll	Costa Rica	2:00.17	
13	Sophie Simard	Canada	2:00.26	
14	Petra Dallmann	Germany	2:00.32	
15	Norie Urabe	Japan	2:00.49	
16	Jiaying Pang	China	2:00.57	

=== Prelims ===
Rank	Name	Nationality	Time	Note
1	Federica Pellegrini	Italy	1:59.12	Q
2	Katie Hoff	USA	1:59.28	Q
3	Linda Mackenzie	Australia	1:59.32	Q
4	Yang Yu	China	1:59.72	Q
5	Solenne Figues	France	1:59.75	Q
6	Whitney Myers	USA	1:59.83	Q
7	Sara Isakovič	Slovenia	1:59.88	Q
8	Josefin Lillhage	Sweden	1:59.90	Q
9	Norie Urabe	Japan	2:00.06	Q
10	Camelia Potec	Romania	2:00.11	Q
11	Melanie Marshall	Great Britain	2:00.17	Q
12	Claudia Poll	Costa Rica	2:00.19	Q
13	Sophie Simard	Canada	2:00.24	Q
14	Paulina Barzycka	Poland	2:00.34	Q
15	Jiaying Pang	China	2:00.41	Q
16	Petra Dallmann	Germany	2:00.63	Q
17	Shayne Reese	Australia	2:00.80	
18	Daria Beliakina	Russia	2:01.08	
19	Meike Freitag	Germany	2:01.19	
20	Kirsty Coventry	Zimbabwe	2:01.20	
21	Helen Norfolk	New Zealand	2:01.35	
22	Haruka Ueda	Japan	2:01.65	
23	Alison Fitch	New Zealand	2:02.15	
24	Ji Eun Lee	South Korea	2:02.25	
25	Cecilia Biagioli	Argentina	2:02.69	
26	Monique Ferreira	Brazil	2:03.39	
27	Simona Ricciardi	Italy	2:03.43	
28	Chin-Kuei Yang	Chinese Taipei	2:03.56	
29	Mariana Brochado	Brazil	2:03.59	
30	Lotte Friis	Denmark	2:03.63	
31	Tatiana Rouba	Spain	2:03.75	
32	Na-Ri Park	South Korea	2:03.78	
33	Katarzyna Kowalczyk	Poland	2:03.96	
34	Julie Hjorth-Hansen	Denmark	2:03.97	
35	Ionela Cozma	Romania	2:04.13	
36	Hang Yu Sze	Hong Kong	2:06.10	
37	Christine Mailliet	Luxembourg	2:06.28	
38	Jasna Ovsenik	Slovenia	2:06.31	
39	Joscelin Yeo	Singapore	2:06.37	
40	Man-Hsu Lin	Chinese Taipei	2:06.59	
41	Alexia Pamela Benitez Quijada	El Salvador	2:07.81	
42	Jiratida Phinyosophon	Thailand	2:07.97	
43	Maryia Hanchar	Belarus	2:08.07	
44	Gisela Morales	Guatemala	2:08.16	
45	Alia Atkinson	Jamaica	2:08.62	
46	Sarah Chahed	Tunisia	2:08.63	
47	Carolina Cerqueda	Andorra	2:08.80	
48	Mylene Ong	Singapore	2:08.84	
49	Paola Duguet	Colombia	2:09.50	
50	Khadija Ciss	Senegal	2:10.22	
51	Wing Yan Fung	Hong Kong	2:10.29	
52	Shrone Austin	Seychelles	2:11.15	
53	Man Wai Fong	Macao	2:11.90	
54	Olga Beresneva	Israel	2:12.32	
55	Jakie Wellman	Zambia	2:12.43	
56	Davina Mangion	Malta	2:12.79	
57	Nimitta Thaveesupsoonthorn	Thailand	2:13.04	
58	Imane Boulaamane	Morocco	2:13.63	
59	Simona Muccioli	San Marino	2:15.02	
60	Laura Rodriguez	Dominican Republic	2:17.98	
--	Anifath F.M. Okanla	Benin	DNS	
--	Brittany Reimer	Canada	DNS	

== See also ==
- Swimming at the 2003 World Aquatics Championships – Women's 200 metre freestyle
- Swimming at the 2004 Summer Olympics – Women's 200 metre freestyle
- Swimming at the 2007 World Aquatics Championships – Women's 200 metre freestyle
