= Eadie (given name) =

Eadie is a unisex given name. Notable people with the name include:

- Eadie Adams (1907–1983), American film actress
- Eadie Fraser (1860–1886), Scottish football player
- Eadie Wetzel (1952–2015), American swimmer

== See also ==
- Eadie (surname)
