= William Eadie =

William Eadie may refer to:

- William Eadie (cricketer) (1864–1914), English cricketer
- William Eadie (footballer) (1882–1915), Scottish football goalkeeper
- Ax (wrestler) (William Reid Eadie, born 1947), known as Bill, American professional wrestler
- Bill Eadie (footballer) (William Philip Eadie, 1882–?), Scottish football centre-half
