= James Eadie =

James or Jim Eadie may refer to:

- James Eadie (brewer) (1827–1904), Scottish brewer
- James Eadie (barrister) (born 1962), British barrister
- James Eadie (footballer), Scottish footballer
- Jim Eadie (footballer) (born 1947), Scottish footballer
- Jim Eadie (politician) (born 1968), Scottish politician
