= 200 metres freestyle =

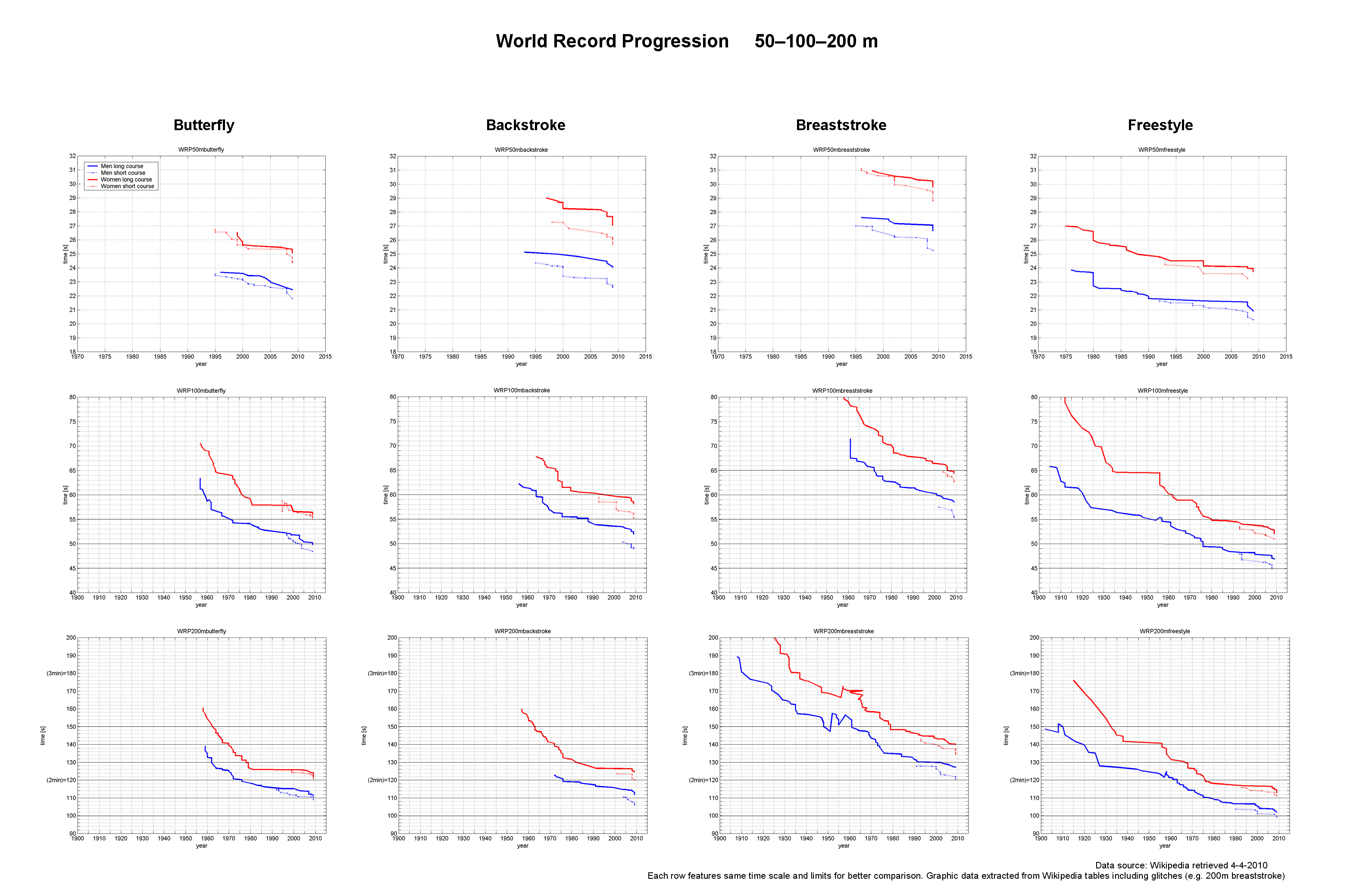
Graphs of the progression of the World Records in all four strokes (50m, 100m and 200m distances).

The 200 metres freestyle is an event in competitive swimming. World records are ratified by World Aquatics (formerly FINA). The current long course world record holders are Germany's Paul Biedermann and the Australia's Ariarne Titmus, while the current short course world record holders are the US' Luke Hobson and Australia's Mollie O'Callaghan.

The men's event was first contested at the Olympic Games in 1900, but was absent from the program from 1904–1964. In 1968, the men's event was reinstated and the women's event was introduced; the current Olympic champions are Romania's David Popovici, and O'Callaghan. It was first contested at the World Aquatics Championships in 1973; the current world champions (long course) are Popovici and O'Callaghan. It was first contested at the World Aquatics Swimming Championships (25m) in 1993; the current world champions (short course) are Hobson, and Hong Kong's Siobhán Haughey.

== World record progression ==
=== Men long course ===
| # | Time | | Name | Nationality | Date | Meet | Location | Ref |
|---|---|---|---|---|---|---|---|---|
| 0 | 2:28.6 | | Frederick Lane | Australia | 18 August 1902 | - | Weston-super-Mare, United Kingdom | |
| 0 | 2:26.8 | | Zoltan Halmay | Hungary | 28 June 1908 | - | Budapest, Hungary | |
| 1 | 2:31.6 | | Otto Scheff | Austria | 11 November 1908 | - | Vienna, Austria | |
| 2 | 2:30.0 | | Frank Beaurepaire | Australia | 9 September 1910 | - | Exeter, United Kingdom | |
| 3 | 2:25.4 | | Charles Daniels | United States | 28 March 1911 | - | Pittsburgh, United States | |
| 4 | 2:21.6 | | Norman Ross | United States | 24 November 1916 | - | San Francisco, United States | |
| 5 | 2:19.8 | | Tedford Cann | United States | 10 April 1920 | - | Detroit, United States | |
| 6 | 2:15.6 | | Johnny Weissmuller | United States | 26 May 1922 | - | Honolulu, United States | |
| 7 | 2:15.2 | | Johnny Weissmuller | United States | 9 December 1925 | - | McKeesport, United States | |
| 8 | 2:08.0 | | Johnny Weissmuller | United States | 5 April 1927 | - | Ann Arbor, United States | |
| 9 | 2:07.2 | | Jack Medica | United States | 12 April 1935 | - | Chicago, United States | |
| 10 | 2:06.2 | | Bill Smith | United States | 12 February 1944 | - | Columbus, United States | |
| 11 | 2:05.4 | | Alex Jany | France | 20 September 1946 | - | Marseille, France | |
| 12 | 2:04.6 | | John Marshall | Australia | 31 March 1950 | Yale (?) | New Haven, United States | |
| 13 | 2:03.9 | | Ford Konno | United States | 27 February 1954 | - | Columbus, Australia | |
| 14 | 2:03.4 | | Jack Wardrop | Great Britain | 4 March 1955 | - | Columbus, United States | |
| 15 | 2:01.5 | | Dick Hanley | United States | 8 March 1957 | - | Minneapolis, United States | |
| 16 | 2:04.8 | | John Konrads | Australia | 8 January 1958 | - | Sydney, Australia | |
| 17 | 2:03.2 | | John Konrads | Australia | 5 May 1958 | - | Sydney, Australia | |
| 18 | 2:03.0 | | Tsuyoshi Yamanaka | Japan | 22 August 1958 | - | Osaka, Japan | |
| 19 | 2:02.2 | | John Konrads | Australia | 16 January 1959 | - | Sydney, Australia | |
| 20 | 2:01.5 | | Tsuyoshi Yamanaka | Japan | 26 July 1959 | - | Osaka, Japan | |
| 21 | 2:01.2 | | Tsuyoshi Yamanaka | Japan | 24 June 1961 | - | Osaka, Japan | |
| 22 | 2:01.1 | | Tsuyoshi Yamanaka | Japan | 6 August 1961 | - | Tokyo, Japan | |
| 23 | 2:00.4 | | Tsuyoshi Yamanaka | Japan | 20 August 1961 | Men’s National Outdoor Championships | Los Angeles, United States | |
| 23 | 2:00.4 | = | Don Schollander | United States | 11 August 1962 | Men’s National Outdoor Championships | Cuyahoga Falls, United States | |
| 25 | 2:00.3 | | Bob Windle | Australia | 21 April 1963 | - | tokyo, Japan | |
| 26 | 1:58.8 | | Don Schollander | United States | 27 July 1963 | 5th Annual Los Angeles Invitiational | Los Angeles, United States | |
| 27 | 1:58.5 | | Don Schollander | United States | 17 August 1963 | 6th US-Japan swimming and diving meet | Tokyo, Japan | |
| 28 | 1:58.4 | | Don Schollander | United States | 24 August 1963 | - | Osaka, Japan | |
| 29 | 1:58.2 | | Hans-Joachim Klein | West Germany | 24 May 1964 | - | Dortmund, West Germany | |
| 30 | 1:57.6 | | Don Schollander | United States | 1 August 1964 | US National Championships | Los Altos, United States | |
| 31 | 1:57.2 | | Don Schollander | United States | 29 July 1966 | - | Los Angeles, United States | |
| 32 | 1:56.2 | | Don Schollander | United States | 19 August 1966 | - | Lincoln, United States | |
| 33 | 1:56.0 | | Don Schollander | United States | 29 July 1967 | Pan American Games | Winnipeg, Canada | |
| 34 | 1:55.7 | | Don Schollander | United States | 12 August 1967 | AAU National Outdoor Championships | Oak Park, United States | |
| 35 | 1:54.8 | h | Don Schollander | United States | 30 August 1968 | US Olympic Trials | Long Beach, United States | |
| 36 | 1:54.3 | | Don Schollander | United States | 30 August 1968 | US Olympic Trials | Long Beach, United States | |
| 36 | 1:54.3 | = | Mark Spitz | United States | 12 July 1969 | Santa Clara Invitational | Santa Clara, United States | |
| 38 | 1:54.2 | | Mark Spitz | United States | 4 September 1971 | USA vs. GDR Dual Meet | Leipzig, East Germany | |
| 39 | 1:53.5 | r | Mark Spitz | United States | 10 September 1971 | USA vs. USSR vs. GBR Meet | Minsk, Soviet Union | |
| 40 | 1:52.78 | | Mark Spitz | United States | 29 August 1972 | Olympic Games | Munich, West Germany | |
| 41 | 1:51.66 | | Tim Shaw | United States | 23 August 1974 | AAU National Outdoor Championships | Concord, United States | |
| 42 | 1:51.41 | h | Bruce Furniss | United States | 18 June 1975 | US World Championship Trials | Long Beach, United States | |
| 43 | 1:50.89 | | Bruce Furniss | United States | 18 June 1975 | US World Championship Trials | Long Beach, United States | |
| 44 | 1:50.32 | | Bruce Furniss | United States | 21 August 1975 | AAU National Outdoor Championships | Kansas City, United States | |
| 45 | 1:50.29 | | Bruce Furniss | United States | 19 July 1976 | Olympic Games | Montreal, Canada | |
| 46 | 1:49.83 | | Sergey Kopliakov | Soviet Union | 7 April 1979 | USSR Vs. GDR Junior Meet | Potsdam, East Germany | |
| 47 | 1:49.16 | | Rowdy Gaines | United States | 11 April 1980 | AAU National Indoor Championships | Austin, United States | |
| 48 | 1:48.93 | | Rowdy Gaines | United States | 19 July 1982 | US World Championship Trials | Mission Viejo, United States | |
| 49 | 1:48.28 | | Michael Gross | West Germany | 22 June 1983 | FRG Nationals | Hanover, West Germany | |
| 50 | 1:47.87 | | Michael Gross | West Germany | 22 August 1983 | European Championships | Rome, Italy | |
| 51 | 1:47.55 | | Michael Gross | West Germany | 8 June 1984 | FRG Nationals | Munich, West Germany | |
| 52 | 1:47.44 | | Michael Gross | West Germany | 29 July 1984 | Olympic Games | Los Angeles, United States | |
| 53 | 1:47.25 | | Duncan Armstrong | Australia | 19 September 1988 | Olympic Games | Seoul, South Korea | |
| 54 | 1:46.69 | | Giorgio Lamberti | Italy | 15 August 1989 | European Championships | Bonn, West Germany | |
| 55 | 1:46.67 | r | Grant Hackett | Australia | 23 March 1999 | Australian Championships | Brisbane, Australia | |
| 56 | 1:46.34 | sf | Ian Thorpe | Australia | 23 August 1999 | Pan Pacific Championships | Sydney, Australia | |
| 57 | 1:46.00 | | Ian Thorpe | Australia | 24 August 1999 | Pan Pacific Championships | Sydney, Australia | |
| 58 | 1:45.69 | sf | Ian Thorpe | Australia | 14 May 2000 | Australian Championships | Sydney, Australia | |
| 59 | 1:45.51 | | Ian Thorpe | Australia | 15 May 2000 | Australian Championships | Sydney, Australia | |
| 60 | 1:45.35 | sf | Pieter van den Hoogenband | Netherlands | 17 September 2000 | Olympic Games | Sydney, Australia | |
| 60 | 1:45.35 | = | Pieter van den Hoogenband | Netherlands | 18 September 2000 | Olympic Games | Sydney, Australia | |
| 62 | 1:44.69 | | Ian Thorpe | Australia | 27 March 2001 | Australian Championships | Hobart, Australia | |
| 63 | 1:44.06 | | Ian Thorpe | Australia | 25 July 2001 | World Championships | Fukuoka, Japan | |
| 64 | 1:43.86 | | Michael Phelps | United States | 27 March 2007 | World Championships | Melbourne, Australia | |
| 65 | 1:42.96 | | Michael Phelps | United States | 12 August 2008 | Olympic Games | Beijing, China | |
| 66 | 1:42.00 | | Paul Biedermann | Germany | 25 July 2009 | World Championships | Rome, Italy | |

=== Men short course ===
| # | Time | | Name | Nationality | Date | Meet | Location | Ref |
|---|---|---|---|---|---|---|---|---|
| 1 | 1:44.50 | | Michael Gross | West Germany | 1 December 1981 | West German Championships | Bremen, West Germany | |
| 2 | 1:44.14 | | Michael Gross | West Germany | 5 February 1988 | Coca-Cola Meet | Boulogne-Billancourt, France | |
| 3 | 1:43.64 | | Giorgio Lamberti | Italy | 11 February 1990 | World Cup | Bonn, Germany | |
| 4 | 1:43.28 | | Ian Thorpe | Australia | 1 April 1999 | World Championships | Hong Kong | |
| 5 | 1:42.54 | | Ian Thorpe | Australia | 17 January 2000 | World Cup | Sydney, Australia | |
| 6 | 1:41.10 | | Ian Thorpe | Australia | 6 February 2000 | World Cup | Berlin, Germany | |
| 7 | 1:40.83 | | Paul Biedermann | Germany | 16 November 2008 | World Cup | Berlin, Germany | |
| 8 | 1:39.37 | | Paul Biedermann | Germany | 15 November 2009 | World Cup | Berlin, Germany | |
| 9 | 1:38.91 | r | Luke Hobson | United States | 13 December 2024 | World Championships | Budapest, Hungary | |
| 10 | 1:38.61 | | Luke Hobson | United States | 15 December 2024 | World Championships | Budapest, Hungary | |

=== Women long course ===
| # | Time | | Name | Nationality | Date | Meet | Location | Ref |
|---|---|---|---|---|---|---|---|---|
| 1 | 2:56.0 | | Fanny Durack | Australia | 4 March 1915 | - | Sydney, Australia | |
| 2 | 2:47.6 | | Charlotte Boyle | United States | 25 August 1921 | - | New Brighton, United States | |
| 3 | 2:45.2 | | Gertrude Ederle | United States | 4 April 1923 | - | Brooklyn, United States | |
| 4 | 2:40.6 | | Martha Norelius | United States | 28 February 1926 | - | Miami, United States | |
| 5 | 2:34.6 | | Helene Madison | United States | 6 March 1930 | - | St. Augustine, United States | |
| 6 | 2:28.6 | | Willy den Ouden | Netherlands | 3 May 1933 | - | Rotterdam, Netherlands | |
| 7 | 2:27.6 | | Willy den Ouden | Netherlands | 5 May 1934 | - | Dundee, United Kingdom | |
| 8 | 2:25.3 | | Willy den Ouden | Netherlands | 8 September 1935 | - | Copenhagen, Denmark | |
| 9 | 2:24.6 | | Rie van Veen | Netherlands | 26 February 1938 | - | Rotterdam, Netherlands | |
| 10 | 2:21.7 | | Ragnhild Hveger | Denmark | 11 September 1938 | - | Aarhus, Denmark | |
| 11 | 2:20.7 | | Dawn Fraser | Australia | 25 February 1956 | - | Sydney, Australia | |
| 12 | 2:19.3 | | Lorraine Crapp | Australia | 25 August 1956 | - | Townsville, Australia | |
| 13 | 2:18.5 | | Lorraine Crapp | Australia | 20 October 1956 | - | Sydney, Australia | |
| 14 | 2:17.7 | | Dawn Fraser | Australia | 10 February 1958 | - | Adelaide, Australia | |
| 15 | 2:14.7 | | Dawn Fraser | Australia | 22 February 1958 | - | Melbourne, Australia | |
| 16 | 2:11.6 | | Dawn Fraser | Australia | 27 February 1960 | - | Sydney, Australia | |
| 17 | 2:10.5 | | Lillian Watson | United States | 19 August 1966 | - | Lincoln, United States | |
| 18 | 2:09.7 | | Pam Kruse | United States | 19 August 1967 | US National Championships | Philadelphia, United States | |
| 19 | 2:09.5 | | Susan Pederson | United States | 6 July 1968 | Santa Clara International | Santa Clara, United States | |
| 20 | 2:08.8 | | Edith Wetzel | United States | 2 August 1968 | US National Championships | Lincoln, United States | |
| 21 | 2:07.9 | h | Linda Gustavson | United States | 24 August 1968 | US Olympic Trials | Los Angeles, United States | |
| 22 | 2:06.7 | | Debbie Meyer | United States | 24 August 1968 | US Olympic Trials | Los Angeles, United States | |
| 23 | 2:06.5 | | Shane Gould | Australia | 1 May 1971 | Coca-Cola International | London, United Kingdom | |
| 24 | 2:05.8 | | Shane Gould | Australia | 26 November 1971 | - | Sydney, Australia | |
| 25 | 2:05.21 | | Shirley Babashoff | United States | 4 August 1972 | US Olympic Trials | Chicago, United States | |
| 26 | 2:03.56 | | Shane Gould | Australia | 1 September 1972 | Olympic Games | Munich, West Germany | |
| 27 | 2:03.22 | | Kornelia Ender | East Germany | 22 August 1974 | European Championships | Vienna, Austria | |
| 28 | 2:02.94 | | Shirley Babashoff | United States | 23 August 1974 | US National Championships | Concord, United States | |
| 28 | 2:02.94 | = | Shirley Babashoff | United States | 31 August 1974 | USA vs East Germany Dual Meet | Concord, United States | |
| 30 | 2:02.27 | | Kornelia Ender | East Germany | 15 March 1975 | East Germany vs Soviet Union Dual Meet | Dresden, East Germany | |
| 31 | 1:59.78 | | Kornelia Ender | East Germany | 2 June 1976 | East German Championships | East Berlin, East Germany | |
| 32 | 1:59.26 | | Kornelia Ender | East Germany | 22 July 1976 | Olympic Games | Montreal, Canada | |
| 33 | 1:59.04 | | Barbara Krause | East Germany | 2 July 1978 | East German Championships | East Berlin, East Germany | |
| 34 | 1:58.53 | | Cynthia Woodhead | United States | 22 August 1978 | World Championships | West Berlin, West Germany | |
| 35 | 1:58.43 | | Cynthia Woodhead | United States | 3 July 1979 | Pan American Games | San Juan, Puerto Rico | |
| 36 | 1:58.23 | | Cynthia Woodhead | United States | 3 September 1979 | World Cup | Tokyo, Japan | |
| 37 | 1:57.75 | | Kristin Otto | East Germany | 23 May 1984 | East German Championships | Magdeburg, East Germany | |
| 38 | 1:57.55 | | Heike Friedrich | East Germany | 18 June 1986 | East German Championships | East Berlin, East Germany | |
| 39 | 1:56.78 | | Franziska van Almsick | Germany | 6 September 1994 | World Championships | Rome, Italy | |
| 40 | 1:56.64 | | Franziska van Almsick | Germany | 3 August 2002 | European Championships | Berlin, Germany | |
| 41 | 1:56.47 | sf | Federica Pellegrini | Italy | 27 March 2007 | World Championships | Melbourne, Australia | |
| 42 | 1:55.52 | | Laure Manaudou | France | 28 March 2007 | World Championships | Melbourne, Australia | |
| 43 | 1:55.45 | h | Federica Pellegrini | Italy | 11 August 2008 | Olympic Games | Beijing, China | |
| 44 | 1:54.82 | | Federica Pellegrini | Italy | 13 August 2008 | Olympic Games | Beijing, China | |
| 45 | 1:54.47 | | Federica Pellegrini | Italy | 8 March 2009 | Italian Championships | Riccione, Italy | |
| 46 | 1:53.67 | sf | Federica Pellegrini | Italy | 28 July 2009 | World Championships | Rome, Italy | |
| 47 | 1:52.98 | | Federica Pellegrini | Italy | 29 July 2009 | World Championships | Rome, Italy | |
| 48 | 1:52.85 | | Mollie O'Callaghan | Australia | 26 July 2023 | World Championships | Fukuoka, Japan | |
| 49 | 1:52.23 | | Ariarne Titmus | Australia | 12 June 2024 | Australian Trials | Brisbane, Australia | |

=== Women short course ===
| # | Time | Name | Nationality | Date | Meet | Location | Ref |
|---|---|---|---|---|---|---|---|
| 1 | 1:55.84 | Franziska van Almsick | Germany | 9 January 1993 | World Cup | Beijing, China | |
| 2 | 1:55.42 | Claudia Poll | Costa Rica | 1 December 1995 | World Championships | Rio de Janeiro, Brazil | |
| 3 | 1:54.17 | Claudia Poll | Costa Rica | 18 April 1997 | World Championships | Gothenburg, Sweden | |
| 4 | 1:54.04 | Lindsay Benko | United States | 7 April 2002 | World Championships | Moscow, Russia | |
| 5 | 1:53.29 | Libby Lenton | Australia | 19 November 2005 | World Cup | Sydney, Australia | |
| 6 | 1:53.18 | Coralie Balmy | France | 6 December 2008 | French Championships | Angers, France | |
| 7 | 1:51.85 | Federica Pellegrini | Italy | 14 December 2008 | European Championships | Rijeka, Croatia | |
| 8 | 1:51.17 | Federica Pellegrini | Italy | 13 December 2009 | European Championships | Istanbul, Turkey | |
| 9 | 1:50.78 | Sarah Sjöström | Sweden | 7 December 2014 | World Championships | Doha, Qatar | |
| 10 | 1:50.43 | Sarah Sjöström | Sweden | 12 August 2017 | World Cup | Eindhoven, Netherlands | |
| 11 | 1:50.31 | Siobhan Haughey | Hong Kong | 16 December 2021 | World Championships | Abu Dhabi, United Arab Emirates | |
| 12 | 1:49.77 | Mollie O'Callaghan | Australia | 18 October 2025 | World Cup | Westmont, United States | |
| 13 | 1:49.36 | Mollie O'Callaghan | Australia | 24 October 2025 | World Cup | Toronto, Canada | |

== All-time top 25 ==
Tables show data for two definitions of "Top 25" - the top 25 200 m freestyle times and the top 25 athletes:
- denotes top performance for athletes in the top 25 200 m freestyle times
- denotes lesser performances, still in the top 25 200 m freestyle times, by repeat athletes
- denotes top performance (only) for other top 25 athletes who fall outside the top 25 200 m freestyle times

=== Men long course ===
- Correct as of September 2026

| Ath.# | Perf.# | Time | Athlete | Nation | Date | Place | Ref. |
|---|---|---|---|---|---|---|---|
| 1 | 1 | 1:42.00 | Paul Biedermann | Germany | 28 July 2009 | Rome | |
| | 2 | 1:42.81 | Biedermann #2 | | 31 July 2009 | Rome | |
| 2 | 3 | 1:42.96 | Michael Phelps | United States | 12 August 2008 | Beijing | |
| 3 | 4 | 1:42.97 | David Popovici | Romania | 15 August 2022 | Rome | |
| | 5 | 1:43.13 | Popovici #2 | | 21 June 2024 | Belgrade | |
| 4 | 6 | 1:43.14 | Yannick Agnel | France | 30 July 2012 | London | |
| | 7 | 1:43.21 | Popovici #3 | | 20 June 2022 | Budapest | |
| | 8 | 1:43.22 | Phelps #2 | | 28 July 2009 | Rome | |
| | 9 | 1:43.31 | Phelps #3 | | 13 August 2008 | Beijing | |
| 5 | 10 | 1:43.49 | Zhang Zhanshuo | China | 23 September 2026 | Tokyo | |
| | 11 | 1:43.53 | Popovici #4 | | 29 July 2025 | Singapore | |
| | 12 | 1:43.64 | Popovici #5 | | 26 June 2025 | Šamorín | |
| | 13 | 1:43.65 | Biedermann #3 | | 27 July 2009 | Rome | |
| 6 | 14 | 1:43.73 | Luke Hobson | United States | 4 June 2025 | Indianapolis | |
| 7 | 15 | 1:43.76 | Léon Marchand | France | 10 August 2026 | Paris | |
| | 16 | 1:43.84 | Hobson #2 | | 29 July 2025 | Singapore | |
| | 17 | 1:43.85 | Hobson #3 | | 12 August 2026 | Irvine | |
| | 18 | 1:43.86 | Phelps #4 | | 27 March 2007 | Melbourne | |
| 8 | 19 | 1:43.90 | Danila Izotov | Russia | 28 July 2009 | Rome | |
| 9 | 20 | 1:43.92 | Hwang Sun-woo | South Korea | 20 October 2025 | Busan | |
| 10 | 21 | 1:43.96 | Gabriel Jett | United States | 12 August 2026 | Irvine | |
| | 22 | 1:44.02 | Biedermann #4 | | 31 July 2009 | Rome | |
| 11 | 23 | 1:44.06 | Ian Thorpe | Australia | 25 July 2001 | Fukuoka | |
| | 24 | 1:44.10 | Phelps #5 | | 1 July 2008 | Omaha | |
| | 25 | 1:44.13 | Hobson #4 | | 13 August 2026 | Irvine | |
| 12 | | 1:44.14 | Lukas Märtens | Germany | 27 April 2024 | Berlin | |
| 13 | | 1:44.22 | Tom Dean | Great Britain | 27 July 2021 | Tokyo | |
| 14 | | 1:44.26 | Duncan Scott | Great Britain | 27 July 2021 | Tokyo | |
| 15 | | 1:44.30 | Matt Richards | Great Britain | 25 July 2023 | Fukuoka | |
| 16 | | 1:44.38 | Danas Rapšys | Lithuania | 17 August 2019 | Singapore | |
| 17 | | 1:44.39 | Sun Yang | China | 25 July 2017 | Budapest | |
| 18 | | 1:44.44 | Ryan Lochte | United States | 26 July 2011 | Shanghai | |
| 19 | | 1:44.54 | Tatsuya Murasa | Japan | 29 July 2025 | Singapore | |
| 20 | | 1:44.55 | Tomas Navikonis | Lithuania | 14 August 2026 | Paris | |
| 21 | | 1:44.65 | Katsuhiro Matsumoto | Japan | 5 April 2021 | Tokyo | |
| 21 | | 1:44.65 | Pan Zhanle | China | 4 May 2023 | Hangzhou | |
| 23 | | 1:44.66 | Fernando Scheffer | Brazil | 27 July 2021 | Tokyo | |
| 24 | | 1:44.72 | Carlos D'Ambrosio | Italy | 10 August 2026 | Paris | |
| 25 | | 1:44.74 | Kieran Smith | United States | 28 July 2021 | Tokyo | |

=== Men short course ===
- Correct as of October 2026

| Ath.# | Perf.# | Time | Athlete | Nation | Date | Place | Ref. |
|---|---|---|---|---|---|---|---|
| 1 | 1 | 1:38.61 | Luke Hobson | United States | 15 December 2024 | Budapest | |
| | 2 | 1:38.91 | Hobson #2 | | 13 December 2024 | Budapest | |
| 2 | 3 | 1:39.37 | Paul Biedermann | Germany | 15 November 2009 | Berlin | |
| 3 | 4 | 1:39.70 | Yannick Agnel | France | 15 November 2012 | Angers | |
| 4 | 5 | 1:39.72 | Hwang Sun-woo | South Korea | 18 December 2022 | Melbourne | |
| | 6 | 1:39.81 | Biedermann #2 | | 13 December 2009 | Istanbul | |
| 5 | 7 | 1:39.83 | Duncan Scott | Great Britain | 2 November 2024 | Singapore | |
| | 8 | 1:39.93 | Hobson #3 | | 31 October 2026 | Westmont | |
| | 9 | 1:39.94 | Hobson #4 | | 25 October 2025 | Toronto | |
| 6 | 10 | 1:40.08 | Danila Izotov | Russia | 13 December 2009 | Istanbul | |
| 7 | 11 | 1:40.16 | Edward Sommerville | Australia | 29 September 2026 | Sydney | |
| 8 | 12 | 1:40.19 | Chris Guiliano | United States | 25 October 2025 | Toronto | |
| | 13 | 1:40.25 | Scott #2 | | 22 November 2020 | Budapest | |
| | 14 | 1:40.26 | Guiliano #2 | | 31 October 2026 | Westmont | |
| | 15 | 1:40.29 | Scott #3 | | 26 October 2024 | Incheon | |
| 9 | 16 | 1:40.36 | Maximillian Giuliani | Australia | 15 December 2024 | Budapest | |
| | 17 | 1:40.39 | Guiliano #3 | | 25 October 2025 | Toronto | |
| 10 | 18 | 1:40.47 | Zhang Zhanshuo | China | 28 October 2026 | Beijing | |
| 11 | 19 | 1:40.49 | Townley Haas | United States | 22 November 2020 | Budapest | |
| | 20 | 1:40.51 | Hobson #5 | | 31 October 2026 | Westmont | |
| | 21 | 1:40.54 | Scott #4 | | 4 December 2025 | Lublin | |
| 12 | 22 | 1:40.58 | Gabriel Jett | United States | 31 October 2026 | Westmont | |
| | 23 | 1:40.59 | Sommerville #2 | | 9 August 2025 | Brisbane | |
| | 24 | 1:40.62 | Hobson #6 | | 19 October 2025 | Westmont | |
| | 25 | 1:40.64 | Sommerville #3 | | 25 September 2024 | Adelaide | |
| 13 | | 1:40.65 | Matthew Sates | South Africa | 3 October 2021 | Berlin | |
| 14 | | 1:40.69 | Carlos D'Ambrosio | Italy | 30 March 2026 | Riccione | |
| 15 | | 1:40.79 | David Popovici | Romania | 18 December 2022 | Melbourne | |
| 16 | | 1:40.80 | Brent Hayden | Canada | 15 November 2009 | Berlin | |
| 16 | | 1:40.80 | Cameron McEvoy | Australia | 25 November 2015 | Sydney | |
| 18 | | 1:40.82 | Kyle Chalmers | Australia | 3 October 2021 | Berlin | |
| 19 | | 1:40.85 | Danas Rapšys | Lithuania | 14 December 2017 | Copenhagen | |
| 20 | | 1:40.86 | Tom Dean | Great Britain | 18 December 2022 | Melbourne | |
| 21 | | 1:40.88 | Shaine Casas | United States | 13 December 2024 | Budapest | |
| 22 | | 1:40.89 | Darian Townsend | South Africa | 15 November 2009 | Berlin | |
| 23 | | 1:40.91 | Léon Marchand | France | 2 November 2024 | Singapore | |
| 24 | | 1:40.94 | Jack McMillan | Great Britain | 4 December 2025 | Lublin | |
| 25 | | 1:41.01 | Aleksandr Shchegolev | Russia | 19 November 2021 | Eindhoven | |
| 25 | | 1:41.01 | Matt Richards | Great Britain | 9 December 2023 | Otopeni | |

=== Women long course ===
- Correct as of August 2026

| Ath.# | Perf.# | Time | Athlete | Nation | Date | Place | Ref. |
|---|---|---|---|---|---|---|---|
| 1 | 1 | 1:52.23 | Ariarne Titmus | Australia | 12 June 2024 | Brisbane | |
| 2 | 2 | 1:52.48 | Mollie O'Callaghan | Australia | 12 June 2024 | Brisbane | |
| | 3 | 1:52.85 | O'Callaghan #2 | | 26 July 2023 | Fukuoka | |
| | 4 | 1:52.86 | O'Callaghan #3 | | 10 June 2026 | Sydney | |
| 3 | 5 | 1:52.98 | Federica Pellegrini | Italy | 29 July 2009 | Rome | |
| | 6 | 1:53.01 | Titmus #2 | | 26 July 2023 | Fukuoka | |
| | 7 | 1:53.09 | Titmus #3 | | 14 June 2021 | Adelaide | |
| | 8 | 1:53.27 | O'Callaghan #4 | | 29 July 2024 | Paris | |
| | 9 | 1:53.31 | Titmus #4 | | 20 May 2022 | Adelaide | |
| | 10 | 1:53.48 | O'Callaghan #5 | | 30 July 2025 | Singapore | |
| | 11 | 1:53.50 | Titmus #5 | | 28 July 2021 | Tokyo | |
| | 12 | 1:53.52 | O'Callaghan #6 | | 1 August 2024 | Paris | |
| | 12 | 1:53.52 | O'Callaghan #7 | | 20 March 2026 | Shenzhen | |
| | 14 | 1:53.57 | O'Callaghan #8 | | 20 April 2024 | Gold Coast | |
| 4 | 15 | 1:53.61 | Allison Schmitt | United States | 31 July 2012 | London | |
| 5 | 16 | 1:53.65 | Summer McIntosh | Canada | 26 July 2023 | Fukuoka | |
| 5 | 16 | 1:53.65 | Lani Pallister | Australia | 10 June 2026 | Sydney | |
| | 18 | 1:53.66 | O'Callaghan #9 | | 27 July 2023 | Fukuoka | |
| | 19 | 1:53.67 | Pellegrini #2 | | 28 July 2009 | Rome | |
| | 19 | 1:53.67 | Pallister #2 | | 12 August 2026 | Irvine | |
| | 21 | 1:53.69 | McIntosh #2 | | 14 May 2024 | Toronto | |
| | 21 | 1:53.69 | O'Callaghan #10 | | 8 April 2026 | Gold Coast | |
| 7 | 23 | 1:53.73 | Katie Ledecky | United States | 9 August 2016 | Rio de Janeiro | |
| | 24 | 1:53.80 | McIntosh #3 | | 6 March 2026 | Westmont | |
| | 25 | 1:53.81 | Titmus #6 | | 29 July 2024 | Paris | |
| 8 | | 1:53.92 | Siobhán Haughey | Hong Kong | 28 July 2021 | Tokyo | |
| 9 | | 1:54.08 | Sarah Sjöström | Sweden | 9 August 2016 | Rio de Janeiro | |
| 10 | | 1:54.26 | Tang Muhan | China | 26 September 2021 | Xi'an | |
| 11 | | 1:54.34 | Freya Colbert | Great Britain | 16 April 2026 | London | |
| 12 | | 1:54.37 | Yang Junxuan | China | 29 July 2021 | Tokyo | |
| 13 | | 1:54.38 | Barbora Seemanová | Czech Republic | 13 August 2026 | Paris | |
| 14 | | 1:54.44 | Taylor Ruck | Canada | 9 August 2018 | Tokyo | |
| 15 | | 1:54.52 | Li Bingjie | China | 30 July 2025 | Singapore | |
| 16 | | 1:54.55 | Emma McKeon | Australia | 11 June 2019 | Brisbane | |
| 17 | | 1:54.65 | Marrit Steenbergen | Netherlands | 13 August 2026 | Paris | |
| 18 | | 1:54.66 | Camille Muffat | France | 6 June 2012 | Canet-en-Roussillon | |
| 19 | | 1:54.67 | Claire Weinstein | United States | 30 July 2025 | Singapore | |
| 20 | | 1:54.68 | Femke Heemskerk | Netherlands | 3 April 2015 | Eindhoven | |
| 21 | | 1:54.70 | Penny Oleksiak | Canada | 28 July 2021 | Tokyo | |
| 22 | | 1:54.81 | Missy Franklin | United States | 31 July 2013 | Barcelona | |
| 23 | | 1:54.85 | Rikako Ikee | Japan | 9 August 2018 | Tokyo | |
| 24 | | 1:54.95 | Charlotte Bonnet | France | 6 August 2018 | Glasgow | |
| 25 | | 1:54.96 | Liu Yaxin | China | 23 March 2025 | Qingdao | |

=== Women short course ===
- Correct as of October 2026

| Ath.# | Perf.# | Time | Athlete | Nation | Date | Place | Ref. |
|---|---|---|---|---|---|---|---|
| 1 | 1 | 1:49.36 | Mollie O'Callaghan | Australia | 24 October 2025 | Toronto | |
| | 2 | 1:49.77 | O'Callaghan #2 | | 18 October 2025 | Westmont | |
| 2 | 3 | 1:50.23 | Marrit Steenbergen | Netherlands | 15 October 2026 | Astana | |
| 3 | 4 | 1:50.31 | Siobhán Haughey | Hong Kong | 16 December 2021 | Abu Dhabi | |
| | 5 | 1:50.33 | Steenbergen #2 | | 4 December 2025 | Lublin | |
| 4 | 6 | 1:50.43 | Sarah Sjöström | Sweden | 12 August 2017 | Eindhoven | |
| | 7 | 1:50.62 | Haughey #2 | | 15 December 2024 | Budapest | |
| | 8 | 1:50.65 | Haughey #3 | | 26 November 2021 | Eindhoven | |
| | 9 | 1:50.66 | Haughey #4 | | 19 November 2021 | Eindhoven | |
| | 10 | 1:50.77 | O'Callaghan #3 | | 11 October 2025 | Carmel | |
| | 11 | 1:50.78 | Sjöström #2 | | 7 December 2014 | Doha | |
| | 12 | 1:50.87 | Haughey #5 | | 15 October 2026 | Astana | |
| | 13 | 1:51.02 | Haughey #6 | | 25 October 2024 | Incheon | |
| | 13 | 1:51.02 | Haughey #7 | | 9 October 2026 | Tashkent | |
| | 15 | 1:51.04 | Haughey #8 | | 4 December 2021 | Eindhoven | |
| | 16 | 1:51.08 | Haughey #9 | | 2 October 2026 | Baku | |
| | 17 | 1:51.11 | Haughey #10 | | 22 November 2020 | Budapest | |
| | 18 | 1:51.13 | Haughey #11 | | 29 October 2022 | Toronto | |
| 5 | 19 | 1:51.17 | Federica Pellegrini | Italy | 13 December 2009 | Istanbul | |
| | 19 | 1:51.17 | Haughey #12 | | 12 November 2021 | Eindhoven | |
| 6 | 21 | 1:51.18 | Katinka Hosszú | Hungary | 7 December 2014 | Doha | |
| | 22 | 1:51.19 | Haughey #13 | | 10 November 2020 | Budapest | |
| | 22 | 1:51.19 | Haughey #14 | | 4 November 2022 | Indianapolis | |
| 7 | 24 | 1:51.25 | Li Bingjie | China | 28 October 2022 | Beijing | |
| 8 | 25 | 1:51.31 | Liberty Clark | United States | 30 October 2026 | Westmont | |
| 9 | | 1:51.38 | Ariarne Titmus | Australia | 11 December 2018 | Hangzhou | |
| 10 | | 1:51.47 | Minna Abraham | Hungary | 4 December 2025 | Lublin | |
| 11 | | 1:51.49 | Mary-Sophie Harvey | Canada | 15 December 2024 | Budapest | |
| 12 | | 1:51.61 | Yang Junxuan | China | 28 October 2022 | Beijing | |
| 13 | | 1:51.62 | Claire Weinstein | United States | 15 December 2024 | Budapest | |
| 14 | | 1:51.65 | Camille Muffat | France | 15 November 2012 | Angers | |
| 15 | | 1:51.66 | Emma McKeon | Australia | 28 November 2015 | Sydney | |
| 16 | | 1:51.67 | Allison Schmitt | United States | 19 December 2009 | Manchester | |
| 17 | | 1:51.69 | Femke Heemskerk | Netherlands | 7 December 2014 | Doha | |
| 18 | | 1:51.75 | Lani Pallister | Australia | 15 December 2024 | Budapest | |
| 18 | | 1:51.75 | Lani Pallister | Australia | 24 October 2025 | Toronto | |
| 19 | | 1:51.81 | Mallory Comerford | United States | 11 December 2018 | Hangzhou | |
| 20 | | 1:51.87 | Freya Anderson | Great Britain | 22 November 2020 | Budapest | |
| 21 | | 1:51.94 | Freya Colbert | Great Britain | 3 December 2025 | Lublin | |
| 21 | | 1:51.94 | Freya Colbert | Great Britain | 4 December 2025 | Lublin | |
| 22 | | 1:51.96 | Rylee Erisman | United States | 30 October 2026 | Westmont | |
| 23 | | 1:52.05 | Simone Manuel | United States | 30 October 2026 | Westmont | |
| 24 | | 1:52.10 | Katie Ledecky | United States | 4 November 2022 | Indianapolis | |
| 25 | | 1:52.15 | Rebecca Smith | Canada | 14 December 2022 | Melbourne | |

== Olympic champions ==
=== Men ===
| Edition | Winner | Time | Notes | Ref. |
|---|---|---|---|---|
| (France) Paris 1900 | Frederick Lane (AUS) | 2:25.2 | (Note: Karl Ruberl set an Olympic record of 2:22.6 in the semifinals.) | |
| 1904–1964 | not included in the program | | | |
| Mexico City 1968 | Michael Wenden (AUS) | 1:55.2 | OR | |
| (West Germany) Munich 1972 | Mark Spitz (USA) | 1:52.78 | WR | |
| (Canada) Montreal 1976 | Bruce Furniss (USA) | 1:50.29 | WR | |
| (Soviet Union) Moscow 1980 | Sergey Koplyakov (URS) | 1:49.81 | OR | |
| (United States) Los Angeles 1984 | Michael Gross (FRG) | 1:47.44 | WR | |
| (South Korea) Seoul 1988 | Duncan Armstrong (AUS) | 1:47.25 | WR | |
| (Spain) Barcelona 1992 | Yevgeny Sadovyi (EUN) | 1:46.70 | OR | |
| (United States) Atlanta 1996 | Danyon Loader (NZL) | 1:47.63 | | |
| (Australia) Sydney 2000 | Pieter van den Hoogenband (NED) | 1:45.35 | =WR (Note: Pieter van den Hoogenband set a world record of 1:45.35 in the semifinals.) | |
| (Greece) Athens 2004 | Ian Thorpe (AUS) | 1:44.71 | OR | |
| (China) Beijing 2008 | Michael Phelps (USA) | 1:42.96 | WR | |
| (United Kingdom) London 2012 | Yannick Agnel (FRA) | 1:43.14 | | |
| (Brazil) Rio de Janeiro 2016 | Sun Yang (CHN) | 1:44.65 | | |
| (Japan) Tokyo 2020 | Tom Dean (GBR) | 1:44.22 | | |
| (France) Paris 2024 | David Popovici (ROU) | 1:44.72 | | |

=== Women ===
| Edition | Winner | Time | Notes | Ref. |
|---|---|---|---|---|
| Mexico City 1968 | Debbie Meyer (USA) | 2:10.5 | OR | |
| (West Germany) Munich 1972 | Shane Gould (AUS) | 2:03.56 | WR | |
| (Canada) Montreal 1976 | Kornelia Ender (GDR) | 1:59.26 | WR | |
| (Soviet Union) Moscow 1980 | Barbara Krause (GDR) | 1:58.33 | OR | |
| (United States) Los Angeles 1984 | Mary Wayte (USA) | 1:59.23 | OR | |
| (South Korea) Seoul 1988 | Heike Friedrich (GDR) | 1:57.65 | OR | |
| (Spain) Barcelona 1992 | Nicole Haislett (USA) | 1:57.90 | | |
| (United States) Atlanta 1996 | Claudia Poll (CRC) | 1:58.16 | | |
| (Australia) Sydney 2000 | Susie O'Neill (AUS) | 1:58.24 | | |
| (Greece) Athens 2004 | Camelia Potec (ROU) | 1:58.03 | | |
| (China) Beijing 2008 | Federica Pellegrini (ITA) | 1:54.82 | WR | |
| (United Kingdom) London 2012 | Allison Schmitt (USA) | 1:53.61 | OR | |
| (Brazil) Rio de Janeiro 2016 | Katie Ledecky (USA) | 1:53.73 | | |
| (Japan) Tokyo 2020 | Ariarne Titmus (AUS) | 1:53.50 | OR | |
| (France) Paris 2024 | Mollie O'Callaghan (AUS) | 1:53.27 | OR | |

== World champions (long course) ==
=== Men ===
| Edition | Winner | Time | Notes | Ref. |
|---|---|---|---|---|
| (Socialist Federal Republic of Yugoslavia) Belgrade 1973 | Jim Montgomery (USA) | 1:53.02 | CR | |
| (Colombia) Cali 1975 | Tim Shaw (USA) | 1:51.04 | CR | |
| (West Germany) West Berlin 1978 | Bill Forrester (USA) | 1:51.02 | CR | |
| (Ecuador) Guayaquil 1982 | Michael Gross (FRG) | 1:49.84 | CR | |
| (Spain) Madrid 1986 | Michael Gross (FRG) | 1:47.92 | CR | |
| (Australia) Perth 1991 | Giorgio Lamberti (ITA) | 1:47.27 | CR | |
| (Italy) Rome 1994 | Antti Kasvio (FIN) | 1:47.32 | | |
| (Australia) Perth 1998 | Michael Klim (AUS) | 1:47.41 | | |
| (Japan) Fukuoka 2001 | Ian Thorpe (AUS) | 1:44.06 | WR | |
| (Spain) Barcelona 2003 | Ian Thorpe (AUS) | 1:45.14 | | |
| (Canada) Montreal 2005 | Michael Phelps (USA) | 1:45.20 | | |
| (Australia) Melbourne 2007 | Michael Phelps (USA) | 1:43.86 | WR | |
| (Italy) Rome 2009 | Paul Biedermann (GER) | 1:42.00 | WR | |
| (China) Shanghai 2011 | Ryan Lochte (USA) | 1:44.44 | | |
| (Spain) Barcelona 2013 | Yannick Agnel (FRA) | 1:44.20 | | |
| (Russia) Kazan 2015 | James Guy (GBR) | 1:45.14 | | |
| (Hungary) Budapest 2017 | Sun Yang (CHN) | 1:44.39 | | |
| (South Korea) Gwangju 2019 | Sun Yang (CHN) | 1:44.93 | | |
| (Hungary) Budapest 2022 | David Popovici (ROU) | 1:43.21 | | |
| (Japan) Fukuoka 2023 | Matt Richards (GBR) | 1:44.30 | | |
| (Qatar) Doha 2024 | Hwang Sun-woo (KOR) | 1:44.75 | | |
| Singapore 2025 | David Popovici (ROU) | 1:43.53 | | |

=== Women ===
| Edition | Winner | Time | Notes | Ref. |
|---|---|---|---|---|
| (Socialist Federal Republic of Yugoslavia) Belgrade 1973 | Keena Rothhammer (USA) | 2:04.99 | CR | |
| (Colombia) Cali 1975 | Shirley Babashoff (USA) | 2:02.50 | CR | |
| (West Germany) West Berlin 1978 | Cynthia Woodhead (USA) | 1:58.53 | WR | |
| (Ecuador) Guayaquil 1982 | Annemarie Verstappen (NED) | 1:59.53 | | |
| (Spain) Madrid 1986 | Heike Friedrich (GDR) | 1:58.26 | CR | |
| (Australia) Perth 1991 | Hayley Lewis (AUS) | 2:00.48 | | |
| (Italy) Rome 1994 | Franziska van Almsick (GER) | 1:56.78 | WR | |
| (Australia) Perth 1998 | Claudia Poll (CRC) | 1:58.90 | | |
| (Japan) Fukuoka 2001 | Giaan Rooney (AUS) | 1:58.57 | | |
| (Spain) Barcelona 2003 | Alena Popchanka (BLR) | 1:58.32 | | |
| (Canada) Montreal 2005 | Solenne Figuès (FRA) | 1:58.60 | | |
| (Australia) Melbourne 2007 | Laure Manaudou (FRA) | 1:55.52 | WR | |
| (Italy) Rome 2009 | Federica Pellegrini (ITA) | 1:52.98 | WR | |
| (China) Shanghai 2011 | Federica Pellegrini (ITA) | 1:55.58 | | |
| (Spain) Barcelona 2013 | Missy Franklin (USA) | 1:54.81 | | |
| (Russia) Kazan 2015 | Katie Ledecky (USA) | 1:55.16 | | |
| (Hungary) Budapest 2017 | Federica Pellegrini (ITA) | 1:54.73 | | |
| (South Korea) Gwangju 2019 | Federica Pellegrini (ITA) | 1:54.22 | | |
| (Hungary) Budapest 2022 | Yang Junxuan (CHN) | 1:54.92 | | |
| (Japan) Fukuoka 2023 | Mollie O'Callaghan (AUS) | 1:52.85 | WR | |
| (Qatar) Doha 2024 | Siobhán Haughey (HKG) | 1:54.89 | | |
| Singapore 2025 | Mollie O'Callaghan (AUS) | 1:53.48 | | |

== World champions (short course) ==
=== Men ===
| Edition | Winner | Time | Notes | Ref. |
|---|---|---|---|---|
| (Spain) Palma de Mallorca 1993 | Antti Kasvio (FIN) | 1:45.21 | CR | |
| (Brazil) Rio de Janeiro 1995 | Gustavo Borges (BRA) | 1:45.55 | | |
| (Sweden) Gothenburg 1997 | Gustavo Borges (BRA) | 1:45.45 | | |
| Hong Kong 1999 | Ian Thorpe (AUS) | 1:43.28 | WR | |
| (Greece) Athens 2000 | Béla Szabados (HUN) | 1:45.27 | | |
| (Russia) Moscow 2002 | Klete Keller (USA) | 1:44.36 | | |
| (United States) Indianapolis 2004 | Michael Phelps (USA) | 1:43.59 | | |
| (China) Shanghai 2006 | Ryk Neethling (RSA) | 1:43.51 | | |
| (United Kingdom) Manchester 2008 | Kenrick Monk (AUS) | 1:43.46 | | |
| (United Arab Emirates) Dubai 2010 | Ryan Lochte (USA) | 1:41.08 | CR | |
| (Turkey) Istanbul 2012 | Ryan Lochte (USA) | 1:41.92 | | |
| (Qatar) Doha 2014 | Chad le Clos (RSA) | 1:41.45 | | |
| (Canada) Windsor 2016 | Park Tae-hwan (KOR) | 1:41.03 | CR | |
| (China) Hangzhou 2018 | Blake Pieroni (USA) | 1:41.49 | | |
| (United Arab Emirates) Abu Dhabi 2021 | Hwang Sun-woo (KOR) | 1:41.60 | | |
| (Australia) Melbourne 2022 | Hwang Sun-woo (KOR) | 1:39.72 | CR | |
| (Hungary) Budapest 2024 | Luke Hobson (USA) | 1:38.61 | WR | |

=== Women ===
| Edition | Winner | Time | Notes | Ref. |
|---|---|---|---|---|
| (Spain) Palma de Mallorca 1993 | Karen Pickering (GBR) | 1:56.25 | CR | |
| (Brazil) Rio de Janeiro 1995 | Claudia Poll (CRC) | 1:55.42 | WR | |
| (Sweden) Gothenburg 1997 | Claudia Poll (CRC) | 1:54.17 | WR | |
| Hong Kong 1999 | Martina Moravcová (SVK) | 1:56.11 | | |
| (Greece) Athens 2000 | Yang Yu (CHN) | 1:56.06 | | |
| (Russia) Moscow 2002 | Lindsay Benko (USA) | 1:54.04 | WR | |
| (United States) Indianapolis 2004 | Josefin Lillhage (SWE) | 1:56.35 | | |
| (China) Shanghai 2006 | Yang Yu (CHN) | 1:54.94 | | |
| (United Kingdom) Manchester 2008 | Kylie Palmer (AUS) | 1:54.41 | | |
| (United Arab Emirates) Dubai 2010 | Camille Muffat (FRA) | 1:52.29 | CR | |
| (Turkey) Istanbul 2012 | Allison Schmitt (USA) | 1:53.59 | | |
| (Qatar) Doha 2014 | Sarah Sjöström (SWE) | 1:50.78 | WR | |
| (Canada) Windsor 2016 | Federica Pellegrini (ITA) | 1:51.73 | | |
| (China) Hangzhou 2018 | Ariarne Titmus (AUS) | 1:51.38 | | |
| (United Arab Emirates) Abu Dhabi 2021 | Siobhán Haughey (HKG) | 1:50.31 | WR | |
| (Australia) Melbourne 2022 | Siobhán Haughey (HKG) | 1:51.65 | | |
| (Hungary) Budapest 2024 | Siobhán Haughey (HKG) | 1:50.62 | | |
