= Eadie (surname) =

Eadie is a surname. Notable people with the surname include:

- Alex Eadie (1920–2012), British politician (Labour MP)
- Betty Eadie (born 1942), American author
- Bill Eadie (born 1947), American wrestler
- Bill Eadie (footballer), Scottish footballer
- Cindy Eadie (born 1982), Canadian ice hockey goalie
- Darren Eadie (born 1975), English footballer
- Ellice Eadie (1912–2001), Irish-born British civil servant and solicitor
- Graham Eadie (born 1953), Australian Rugby League footballer
- Helen Eadie (1947–2013), British politician (Labour MSP)
- Jack Eadie (1888/1889–?), Canadian football player and coach
- James Eadie (brewer) (1827–1904), Scottish brewer
- James Eadie (footballer), Scottish footballer
- Jim Eadie (footballer) (born 1947), Scottish footballer
- Jim Eadie (politician) (born 1968), Scottish politician (SNP MSP)
- John Eadie (1810–1876), Scottish theologian
- John Eadie (cricketer) (1861–1923), English cricketer
- Ken Eadie (born 1961), Scottish footballer
- Nicholas Eadie (1958–2025), Australian actor
- Sean Eadie (born 1969), Australian track cyclist
- Thomas Eadie (1887–1974), United States Navy officer, recipient of the Medal of Honor
- Thomas Wardrope Eadie (1898–1986), Canadian businessman
- William Eadie (cricketer) (1864–1914), English cricketer
- William Eadie (footballer) (1882–1915), Scottish footballer
