= Swimming at the 2009 World Aquatics Championships – Women's 200 metre freestyle =

Women's 200 metre freestyle at the 2009 FINA World Championships
- Venue: Foro Italico
- Dates: 28 July 2009 (heats, semifinals); 29 July 2009 (final)
- Competitors: 98
- Winning time: 1:52.98 WR

Medalists
gold medal	Federica Pellegrini	Italy
silver medal	Allison Schmitt	United States
bronze medal	Dana Vollmer	United States

The heats for the women's 200 m freestyle race at the 2009 World Championships took place in the morning and evening of 28 July and the final took place in the evening session of 29 July at the Foro Italico in Rome, Italy.

== Records ==
World record	Federica Pellegrini (ITA)	1:54.47	Riccione, Italy	8 March 2009
Championship record	Laure Manaudou (FRA)	1:55.52	Melbourne, Australia	28 March 2007

The following records were established during the competition:

Date	Round	Name	Nationality	Time	Record
28 July	Semifinal 1	Federica Pellegrini	Italy	1:53.67	WR
29 July	Final	Federica Pellegrini	Italy	1:52.98	WR

== Results ==
=== Heats ===
Rank	Name	Nationality	Time	Heat	Lane	Notes
1	Dana Vollmer	United States	1:55.98	9	5	
2	Allison Schmitt	United States	1:56.75	10	5	
3	Joanne Jackson	Great Britain	1:56.81	8	5	
4	Ágnes Mutina	Hungary	1:56.84	9	2	NR
5	Sara Isakovič	Slovenia	1:56.99	9	4	
6	Federica Pellegrini	Italy	1:57.22	10	4	
7	Coralie Balmy	France	1:57.30	9	3	
8	Inge Dekker	Netherlands	1:57.32	8	2	
9	Caitlin McClatchey	Great Britain	1:57.44	9	6	
10	Evelyn Verrasztó	Hungary	1:57.63	8	7	
11	Femke Heemskerk	Netherlands	1:57.64	10	3	
12	Yang Yu	China	1:57.83	8	6	
13	Pang Jiaying	China	1:57.91	8	4	
14	Stephanie Rice	Australia	1:58.06	8	3	
15	Ellen Fullerton	Australia	1:58.10	9	7	
16	Elena Sokolova	Russia	1:58.14	9	1	NR
17	Haruka Ueda	Japan	1:58.27	10	7	
18	Heather MacLean	Canada	1:58.42	10	2	
19	Sarah Sjöström	Sweden	1:58.58	8	8	
20	Alexandra Gabor	Canada	1:58.63	8	1	
21	Jördis Steinegger	Austria	1:59.11	10	8	NR
22	Gabriella Fagundez	Sweden	1:59.54	10	1	
23	Erica Buratto	Italy	2:00.08	9	0	
24	Katarina Filova	Slovakia	2:00.11	6	3	
25	Quah Ting Wen	Singapore	2:00.21	8	0	
26	Nina Rangelova	Bulgaria	2:00.60	8	9	
27	Yang Chin-Kuei	Chinese Taipei	2:01.00	7	3	
28	Lee Jae Young	South Korea	2:01.17	7	5	
29	Natthanan Junkrajang	Thailand	2:01.28	7	8	
30	Anna Stylianou	Cyprus	2:01.33	9	9	
31	Cecilia Elizabeth Biagioli	Argentina	2:01.35	7	7	
32	Verena Klocker	Austria	2:01.58	7	6	
33	Katarzyna Wilk	Poland	2:01.72	10	9	
34	Cecilie Johannessen	Norway	2:01.98	7	2	
35	Heysi Villareal	Cuba	2:02.17	6	6	
36	Yanel Pinto	Venezuela	2:02.32	5	7	NR
37	Clare Dawson	Ireland	2:02.46	7	0	
38	Niamh O'Sullivan	Ireland	2:02.72	7	1	
39	Juanita Barreto Barreto	Colombia	2:02.97	5	9	NR
40	Sascha Van den Branden	Belgium	2:03.01	7	9	
41	Elina Partoka	Estonia	2:03.28	7	4	
42	Christine Mailliet	Luxembourg	2:03.59	6	9	
43	Katarina Listopadova	Slovakia	2:03.62	5	4	
44	Liliana Ibanez	Mexico	2:03.73	6	7	NR
45	Amanda Lim	Singapore	2:03.89	6	4	
46	Pamela Benitez	El Salvador	2:03.96	6	1	
47	Erica Cirila Totten	Philippines	2:04.26	5	6	
48	Daryna Zevina	Ukraine	2:04.36	1	9	
49	Nicole Marmol	Ecuador	2:04.51	5	5	
50	Annika Saarnak	Estonia	2:05.15	5	1	
51	Yennifer Marquez	Venezuela	2:05.27	5	3	
52	Jung Ha-eun	South Korea	2:05.29	5	2	
53	Kristina Bernice Lennox	Puerto Rico	2:05.88	4	2	NR
54	Maroua Mathlouthi	Tunisia	2:06.23	6	8	
55	Kimberley Eeson	Zimbabwe	2:06.64	6	0	
56	Anna-Liza Mopio-Jane	Papua New Guinea	2:07.37	3	3	NR
57	Ranohon Amanova	Uzbekistan	2:07.45	4	4	
58	Nicole Horn	Zimbabwe	2:07.52	4	7	
59	Khoo Cai Lin	Malaysia	2:07.53	6	2	
60	Ting Sheng-Yo	Chinese Taipei	2:08.31	5	8	
61	Aiste Dobrovolskaite	Lithuania	2:08.47	5	0	
62	Raffaella Rodoni Palma	Chile	2:09.20	4	5	
63	Andrea Cedron	Peru	2:09.54	4	2	
64	Sara Abdullahu	Albania	2:10.04	3	7	
65	Chinyere Pigot	Suriname	2:10.14	3	0	
66	Shannon Austin	Seychelles	2:11.34	2	5	
67	Daniela Miyahara Coello	Peru	2:11.47	4	6	
68	Karen Milenka Torrez Guzman	Bolivia	2:11.60	2	4	
69	Fong Man Wai	Macau	2:12.52	4	0	
70	Talasha Prabhu	India	2:12.57	2	1	
71	Nibal Yamout	Lebanon	2:12.68	4	9	
72	Miriam Hatamleh	Jordan	2:13.64	3	4	
73	Talisa Pace	Malta	2:14.08	3	6	
74	Diana Al Zamel	Syria	2:15.27	3	8	
75	Vo Thi Thanh Vy	Vietnam	2:15.71	4	8	
76	Sharon Paola Fajardo Sierra	Honduras	2:15.76	2	7	
77	Noelyn Faussane	French Polynesia	2:15.87	2	2	
78	Karen Vilorio	Honduras	2:16.39	2	9	
79	Ayesha Noel	Grenada	2:16.92	2	3	
80	Pina Ercolano	Kenya	2:18.12	1	5	
81	Nicole Huerta	Dominican Republic	2:18.24	2	0	
82	Tin Hon Ko Adeline Mei-Li	Mauritius	2:18.83	2	8	
83	Che Lok In	Macau	2:19.04	3	9	
84	Sylvia Brunlehner	Kenya	2:19.20	1	3	
85	Ashley Bransford	Aruba	2:19.31	3	5	
86	Tieri Erasito	Fiji	2:23.93	1	6	
87	Danielle Bernadine Findlay	Zambia	2:24.45	1	2	
88	Cheyenne Rova	Fiji	2:27.63	1	7	
89	Mahnoor Maqsood	Pakistan	2:32.58	1	1	
90	Maria Gibbons	Palau	2:32.72	1	0	
91	Osisang Chilton	Palau	2:33.88	1	8	
–	Rovena Marku	Albania	DNS	1	4	
–	Jonay Briedenhann	Namibia	DNS	2	6	
–	Dina Hegazy	Egypt	DNS	6	5	
–	Lotte Friis	Denmark	DNS	9	8	
–	Hanae Ito	Japan	DNS	10	0	
–	Camelia Potec	Romania	DNS	10	6	
–	Melinda Sue Micallef	Malta	DSQ	3	2	

=== Semifinals ===
Rank	Name	Nationality	Time	Heat	Lane	Notes
1	Federica Pellegrini	Italy	1:53.67	1	3	WR
2	Dana Vollmer	United States	1:55.29	2	4	AM
3	Joanne Jackson	Great Britain	1:55.54	2	5	NR
4	Allison Schmitt	United States	1:56.11	1	4	
5	Yang Yu	China	1:56.19	1	7	
6	Ágnes Mutina	Hungary	1:56.47	1	5	NR
7	Evelyn Verrasztó	Hungary	1:56.51	1	2	
8	Pang Jiaying	China	1:56.58	2	1	
9	Caitlin McClatchey	Great Britain	1:56.62	2	2	
10	Coralie Balmy	France	1:56.79	2	6	
11	Femke Heemskerk	Netherlands	1:56.86	2	7	
12	Inge Dekker	Netherlands	1:57.00	1	6	
13	Sara Isakovič	Slovenia	1:57.04	2	3	
14	Ellen Fullerton	Australia	1:57.43	2	8	
15	Elena Sokolova	Russia	1:57.96	1	8	NR
16	Stephanie Rice	Australia	1:58.33	1	1	

=== Final ===
Place	Lane	Name	Nationality	Time	Notes
1st place, gold medalist(s)	4	Federica Pellegrini	Italy	1:52.98	WR
2nd place, silver medalist(s)	6	Allison Schmitt	United States	1:54.96	AM
3rd place, bronze medalist(s)	5	Dana Vollmer	United States	1:55.64	
4	3	Joanne Jackson	Great Britain	1:55.88	
5	2	Yang Yu	China	1:56.28	
6	8	Pang Jiaying	China	1:56.47	
7	7	Ágnes Mutina	Hungary	1:56.70	
8	1	Evelyn Verrasztó	Hungary	1:57.50	

== See also ==
- Swimming at the 2007 World Aquatics Championships – Women's 200 metre freestyle
- Swimming at the 2008 Summer Olympics – Women's 200 metre freestyle
