= Swimming at the 2009 World Aquatics Championships – Women's 400 metre freestyle =

The Women's 400 m Freestyle race at the 2009 World Championships was held on 26 July at the Foro Italico in Rome, Italy.

== Records ==
World record	Federica Pellegrini (ITA)	4:00.41	Pescara, Italy	27 June 2009
Championship record	Laure Manaudou (FRA)	4:02.61	Melbourne, Australia	25 March 2007

The following records were established during the competition:

Date	Round	Name	Nationality	Time	Record
26 July	Heat 6	Federica Pellegrini	Italy	4:01.96	CR
26 July	Final	Federica Pellegrini	Italy	3:59.15	WR

== Heats ==
Rank	Name	Nationality	Time	Heat	Lane	Notes
1	Federica Pellegrini	Italy	4:01.96	6	4	CR
2	Allison Schmitt	United States	4:02.80	6	3	
3	Joanne Jackson	Great Britain	4:03.48	5	4	
4	Coralie Balmy	France	4:04.12	5	5	
5	Camelia Potec	Romania	4:04.25	6	5	
6	Ophélie-Cyrielle Étienne	France	4:05.25	5	6	
7	Lotte Friis	Denmark	4:05.40	4	3	NR
8	Rebecca Adlington	Great Britain	4:05.70	4	4	
9	Ellen Fullerton	Australia	4:08.31	4	2	
10	Erika Villaécija García	Spain	4:08.77	5	2	
11	Jördis Steinegger	Austria	4:09.30	6	7	NR
12	Cecilia Elizabeth Biagioli	Argentina	4:10.16	4	1	SA
13	Chloe Sutton	United States	4:10.88	6	6	
14	Alexa Komarnycky	Canada	4:11.35	6	1	
15	Wendy Trott	South Africa	4:11.45	6	2	
16	Maiko Fujino	Japan	4:11.52	6	0	
17	Flavia Zoccari	Italy	4:11.58	5	7	
18	Andreina Pinto	Venezuela	4:11.79	5	0	NR
19	Nuala Murphy	Ireland	4:13.51	3	3	
20	Savannah King	Canada	4:13.58	5	8	
21	Patricia Castañeda	Mexico	4:13.59	4	8	
22	Quah Ting Wen	Singapore	4:13.70	5	9	NR
23	Ren Junni	China	4:14.07	4	6	
24	Elena Sokolova	Russia	4:14.38	5	3	
25	Susana Escobar	Mexico	4:14.70	5	1	
26	Yanel Pinto	Venezuela	4:14.74	3	6	
27	Bronte Barratt	Australia	4:15.62	4	5	
28	Natsumi Iwashita	Japan	4:15.95	4	7	
29	Yang Chin-Kuei	Chinese Taipei	4:15.96	6	9	
30	Lynette Lim	Singapore	4:16.35	3	7	
31	Paula Żukowska	Poland	4:16.64	3	5	
32	Ionela Cozma	Romania	4:16.79	2	2	
33	Niamh O'Sullivan	Ireland	4:16.80	3	4	
34	Nina Cesar	Slovenia	4:17.22	4	0	
35	Cho Youn Soo	South Korea	4:17.59	3	1	
36	Nika Karlina Petric	Slovenia	4:18.14	6	8	
37	Heysi Villareal	Cuba	4:20.94	3	0	
38	Erica Cirila Totten	Philippines	4:21.32	2	4	
39	Pamela Benitez	El Salvador	4:21.58	3	9	
40	Jeong Darae	South Korea	4:22.99	2	5	
41	Kristina Bernice Lennox	Puerto Rico	4:23.26	3	8	
42	Khoo Cai Lin	Malaysia	4:24.48	4	9	
43	Kimberley Eeson	Zimbabwe	4:27.89	3	2	
44	Andrea Cedron	Peru	4:29.80	2	3	
45	Kirsten Lapham	Zimbabwe	4:33.57	1	3	
46	Ting Sheng-Yo	Chinese Taipei	4:33.72	2	1	
47	Daniela Kaori Miyahara Coello	Peru	4:33.75	2	6	
48	Daniela Reyes Hinrichsen	Chile	4:34.09	2	7	
49	Miriam Hatamleh	Jordan	4:41.02	2	0	
50	Nicole Huerta	Dominican Republic	4:41.73	1	5	
51	Ayesha Noel	Grenada	4:46.09	2	9	
52	Vo Thi Thanh Vy	Vietnam	4:47.11	2	8	
53	Diana Al Zamel	Syria	4:47.98	1	4	
54	Sakina Ghulam	Pakistan	4:59.02	1	6	
55	Estellah Fils Rabetsara	Madagascar	5:04.36	1	2	
56	Tieri Erasito	Fiji	5:10.01	1	7	
57	Mahnoor Maqsood	Pakistan	5:18.16	1	8	
—	Sara Abdullahu	Albania	DNS	1	1	

== Final ==
Rank	Name	Nationality	Lane	Time	Notes
1st place, gold medalist(s)	Federica Pellegrini	Italy	4	3:59.15	WR
2nd place, silver medalist(s)	Joanne Jackson	Great Britain	3	4:00.60	NR
3rd place, bronze medalist(s)	Rebecca Adlington	Great Britain	8	4:00.79	
4	Allison Schmitt	United States	5	4:02.51	
5	Coralie Balmy	France	6	4:03.29	
6	Camelia Potec	Romania	2	4:03.41	NR
7	Ophélie-Cyrielle Étienne	France	7	4:04.54	
8	Lotte Friis	Denmark	1	4:07.62	

== See also ==
- Swimming at the 2007 World Aquatics Championships – Women's 400 metre freestyle
- Swimming at the 2008 Summer Olympics – Women's 400 metre freestyle
