= Federica Pellegrini =

Italian swimmer (born 1988)

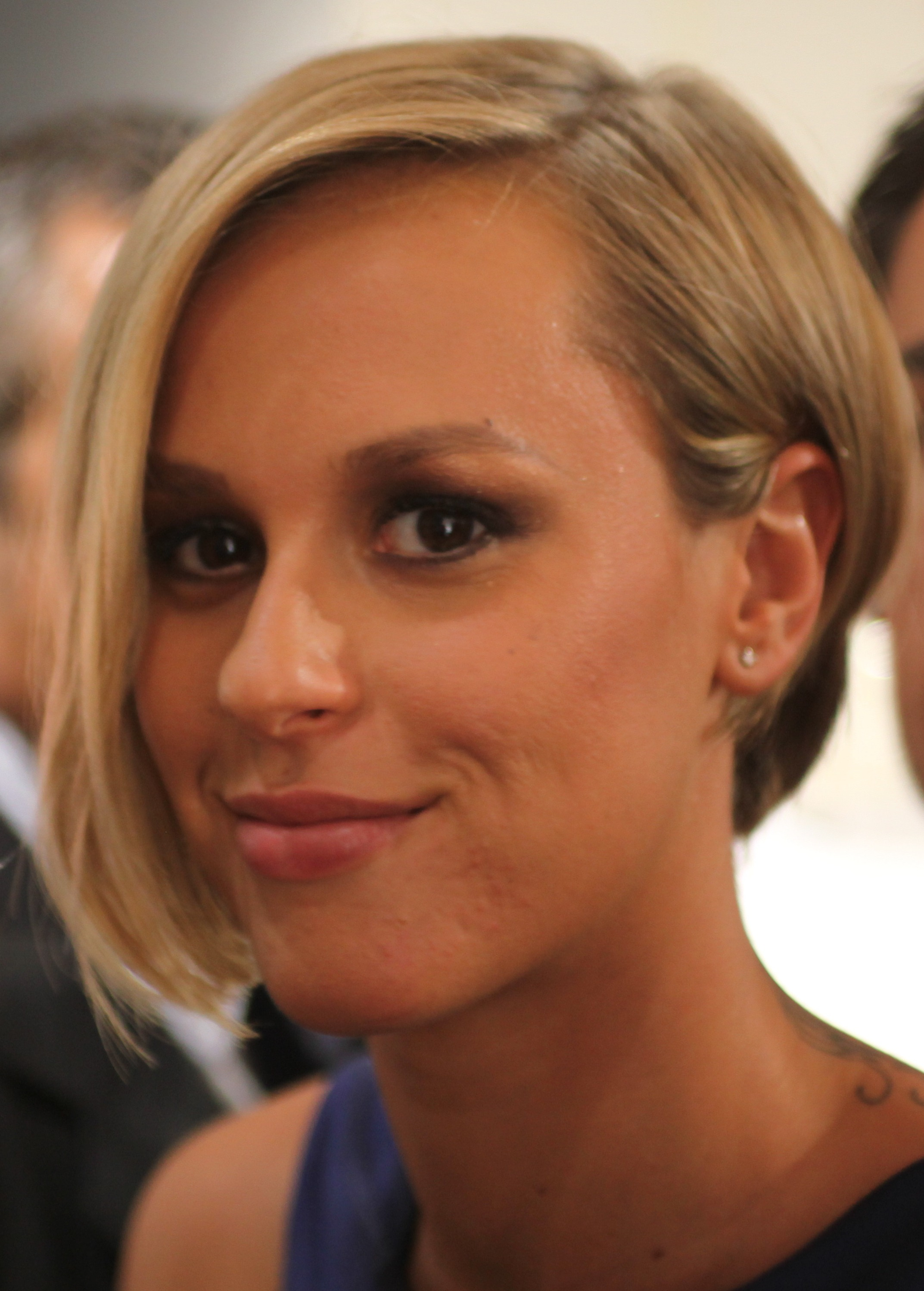
- Pellegrini in 2009

Personal information
- Nickname: la Divina
- National team: Italy
- Born: 5 August 1988 (age 38) Mirano, Italy
- Height: 1.79 m (5 ft 10 in)
- Weight: 65 kg (143 lb)

Sport
- Sport: Swimming
- Strokes: Freestyle
- Club: Circolo Canottieri Aniene
- Coach: Matteo Giunta
Medal record
Women's swimming
Representing Italy
International podiums
Event	1st	2nd	3rd
Olympic Games	1	1	0
World Championships (LC)	6	4	1
World Championships (SC)	1	2	5
European Championships (LC)	7	6	7
European Championships (SC)	7	4	6
Universiade	2	1	1
Mediterranean Games	2	0	0
Total	26	18	20
By individual race
Event	1st	2nd	3rd
200 m freestyle	17	7	1
400 m freestyle	5	2	4
800 m freestyle	1	1	1
Total	23	10	6
By relay race
Event	1st	2nd	3rd
4 × 50 m freestyle	1	0	2
4 × 100 m freestyle	0	3	3
4 × 200 m freestyle	2	1	3
4 × 50 m medley	0	1	2
4 × 100 m medley	0	0	2
4 × 50 m mixed freestyle	0	0	1
4 × 100 m mixed freestyle	0	1	1
4 × 200 m mixed freestyle	0	1	0
4 × 100 m mixed medley	0	1	0
Total	3	8	14
Olympic Games
Gold medal – first place	2008 Beijing	200 m freestyle
Silver medal – second place	2004 Athens	200 m freestyle
World Championships (LC)
Gold medal – first place	2009 Rome	200 m freestyle
Gold medal – first place	2009 Rome	400 m freestyle
Gold medal – first place	2011 Shanghai	200 m freestyle
Gold medal – first place	2011 Shanghai	400 m freestyle
Gold medal – first place	2017 Budapest	200 m freestyle
Gold medal – first place	2019 Gwangju	200 m freestyle
Silver medal – second place	2005 Montreal	200 m freestyle
Silver medal – second place	2013 Barcelona	200 m freestyle
Silver medal – second place	2015 Kazan	200 m freestyle
Silver medal – second place	2015 Kazan	4 × 200 m freestyle
Bronze medal – third place	2007 Melbourne	200 m freestyle
World Championships (SC)
Gold medal – first place	2016 Windsor	200 m freestyle
Silver medal – second place	2006 Shanghai	200 m freestyle
Silver medal – second place	2016 Windsor	4 × 100 m freestyle
Bronze medal – third place	2006 Shanghai	400 m freestyle
Bronze medal – third place	2010 Dubai	400 m freestyle
Bronze medal – third place	2014 Doha	4 × 100 m freestyle
Bronze medal – third place	2016 Windsor	4 × 50 m freestyle
Bronze medal – third place	2018 Hangzhou	4 × 100 m medley
European Championships (LC)
Gold medal – first place	2008 Eindhoven	400 m freestyle
Gold medal – first place	2010 Budapest	200 m freestyle
Gold medal – first place	2012 Debrecen	200 m freestyle
Gold medal – first place	2012 Debrecen	4 × 200 m freestyle
Gold medal – first place	2014 Berlin	200 m freestyle
Gold medal – first place	2014 Berlin	4 × 200 m freestyle
Gold medal – first place	2016 London	200 m freestyle
Silver medal – second place	2008 Eindhoven	4 × 100 m freestyle
Silver medal – second place	2016 London	4 × 100 m freestyle
Silver medal – second place	2016 London	4 × 100 m mixed freestyle
Silver medal – second place	2016 London	4 × 100 m mixed medley
Silver medal – second place	2020 Budapest	4 × 200 m mixed freestyle
Silver medal – second place	2020 Budapest	200 m freestyle
Bronze medal – third place	2008 Eindhoven	4 × 200 m freestyle
Bronze medal – third place	2010 Budapest	800 m freestyle
Bronze medal – third place	2012 Debrecen	4 × 100 m freestyle
Bronze medal – third place	2014 Berlin	4 × 100 m freestyle
Bronze medal – third place	2020 Budapest	4 × 200 m freestyle
Bronze medal – third place	2020 Budapest	4 × 100 m mixed freestyle
Bronze medal – third place	2020 Budapest	4 × 100 m medley
European Championships (SC)
Gold medal – first place	2005 Trieste	200 m freestyle
Gold medal – first place	2008 Rijeka	200 m freestyle
Gold medal – first place	2009 Istanbul	200 m freestyle
Gold medal – first place	2010 Eindhoven	800 m freestyle
Gold medal – first place	2013 Herning	200 m freestyle
Gold medal – first place	2015 Netanya	200 m freestyle
Gold medal – first place	2015 Netanya	4 × 50 m freestyle
Silver medal – second place	2006 Helsinki	400 m freestyle
Silver medal – second place	2007 Debrecen	400 m freestyle
Silver medal – second place	2019 Glasgow	200 m freestyle
Silver medal – second place	2019 Glasgow	4 × 50 m medley
Bronze medal – third place	2005 Trieste	400 m freestyle
Bronze medal – third place	2008 Rijeka	4 × 50 m medley
Bronze medal – third place	2010 Eindhoven	4 × 50 m medley
Bronze medal – third place	2011 Szczecin	4 × 50 m freestyle
Bronze medal – third place	2013 Herning	400 m freestyle
Bronze medal – third place	2017 Copenhagen	4 × 50 m mixed freestyle
Universiade
Gold medal – first place	2007 Bangkok	200 m freestyle
Gold medal – first place	2007 Bangkok	400 m freestyle
Silver medal – second place	2007 Bangkok	800 m freestyle
Bronze medal – third place	2007 Bangkok	4 × 200 m freestyle
Mediterranean Games
Gold medal – first place	2009 Pescara	400 m freestyle
Gold medal – first place	2009 Pescara	4 × 100 m freestyle
National championships
Event	1st	2nd	3rd
Absolute	24	6	4
Spring	66	15	9
Winter	39	15	2
Total	129	36	15

Federica Pellegrini Grande Ufficiale OMRI (Italian pronunciation: [fedeˈriːka pelleˈɡriːni]; born 5 August 1988) is an Italian retired swimmer. A native of Mirano, in the former province of Venice (Metropolitan City of Venice since 2015), she won a gold medal at the 2008 Beijing Olympics. At the 2009 World Championships in Rome (long course swimming pool, 50 m), Pellegrini became the first woman ever to break the 4-minute barrier in the 400 m freestyle with a time of 3:59.15. She also held the women's 200 meters freestyle world record (long course, 50 m).

Pellegrini is the only swimmer − male or female − to have won eight medals in a row in the same event (200 meters freestyle) at the World Championships. She is also the first female Olympic swimming champion from Italy and the only Italian swimmer to have set world records in more than one event. At the 2020 Summer Olympics, she became the first female swimmer to qualify for five consecutive Olympic finals in the same specialty (200 m freestyle). She is a member of the International Olympic Committee (IOC). Pellegrini retired from active competition in 2021. She was nicknamed "La Divina" ("The Divine") by Italian sport journalists.

== Career ==
=== 2004 Olympics ===
Pellegrini's first international podium was at the 2004 Olympic Games in Athens, where she won the silver medal in the 200 m freestyle at the age of 16, becoming the youngest Italian athlete ever to win an Olympic medal in an individual event.

=== 2005–2007 ===
Pellegrini competed at the 2005 Montreal, where she got a silver in the 200 m freestyle, just behind Solenne Figuès, after being the favourite in the event, because of setting previously the best time of the season in the distance. Two years after, she took part in the 400 m freestyle, her first attempt in the event, where she finished fifth. Then she competed also at the 200 m freestyle, where, in the semi-finals, she set her first world record of her career, with a time of 1:56:47, beating the previous one belonging to Franziska van Almsick. But it was beaten the day after in the final by her rival Laure Manaudou, who got the gold medal and immediately broke her world record, while she got just the bronze, behind Annika Lurz too.

=== 2008 ===
Pellegrini's first long course (50 meters) gold medal came at the 2008 European Championships in Eindhoven, where she won the 400 m freestyle setting a world record (4:01.53). She was disqualified in the heats of 200 m freestyle for a wrong start.

At the 2008 Olympic Games in Beijing, she arrived as the world-record holder and favourite for the gold medal in the 400 m freestyle, having set the Olympic record in the heats (4:02.19), but only finished 5th in the final. On the same day, she recovered from that disappointment by setting a world record (1:55.45) in the heats of the 200 m freestyle; in the final, she broke her own world record (1:54.82) and won her first Olympic gold medal.

Pellegrini also proved her strength in short course events at the 2008 European Short Course Championships in Rijeka, when she won the gold medal in the 200 m freestyle at a world-record pace (1:51.85).

=== 2009 ===
In March 2009, Pellegrini competed at the Italian Championships in Riccione. She broke the world record in the 200 m freestyle with a time of 1:54.47.

In June 2009, Pellegrini competed at the Mediterranean Games in Pescara. She broke the world record in the 400 m freestyle with a time of 4:00.41, surpassing Joanne Jackson's mark of 4:00.66 from March 2009.

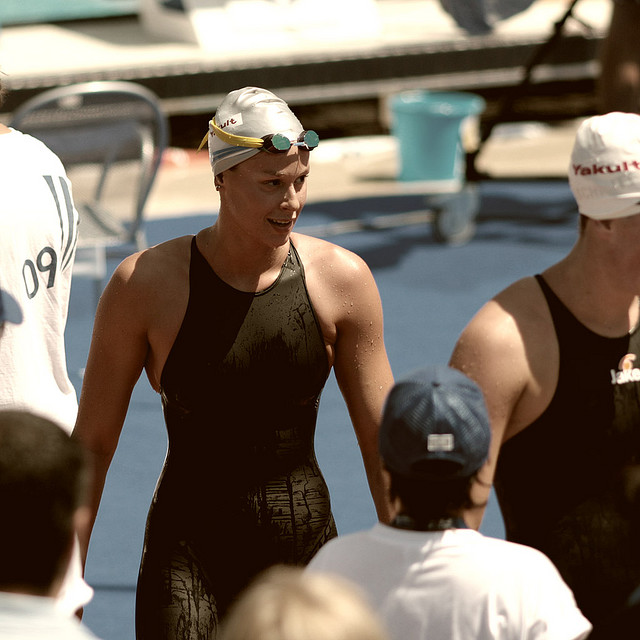
Pellegrini at the 2009 World Aquatics Championships

In July 2009, Pellegrini competed at the 2009 World Championships in Rome. She went 4:01.96 in the heats of the 400 m freestyle, breaking Manaudou's championship record of 4:02.61 from 2007. In the final, Pellegrini won the gold medal in a world record time of 3:59.15, becoming the first female swimmer to break the 4-minute barrier in the event. Her next event was the 200 m freestyle. She broke the world record in the semifinals in a time of 1:53.67, then lowered it again in the final to win the gold medal in a time of 1:52.98.

At 2009 European Short Course Championships in Istanbul she broke the world record in the 200 m freestyle with a time of 1:51.17.

=== 2010–2011 ===
At the 2010 European Championships in Budapest, Pellegrini won the bronze medal in the 800 m freestyle, behind Lotte Friis and Ophélie-Cyrielle Étienne, and the gold medal in the 200 m freestyle with a time of 1:55.45; in the same year, she announced that she would be working with Manaudou's former coach, Philippe Lucas.

At the 2011 World Championships in Shanghai, Pellegrini won the gold medal in the 400 m freestyle with a time of 4:01.97, becoming the second female swimmer after Laure Manaudou to win the gold medal in this event at two consecutive World Aquatics Championships. Two days later, she won the gold medal in the 200 m freestyle too with a time of 1:55:58, becoming the first female swimmer ever to win this title at two consecutive editions of the World Aquatics Championships; after the success in Shanghai, she parted ways with her French coach and began working with Federico Bonifacenti.

=== 2012 ===
In May 2012, she was surprisingly excluded from the final of the 400 m freestyle at the 2012 European Aquatics Championships, after winning two gold medals in other events (200-metre freestyle and 4 × 200 m freestyle relay) and a bronze medal in 4 × 100 freestyle relay.

At the 2012 Summer Olympics in London, Pellegrini finished fifth in the 400 metres freestyle with a time of 4:04.50 and the 200 metres freestyle with a time of 1:56.73.

=== 2013 World Championships ===
After the Olympics, Pellegrini declared she wouldn't take part to 200 and 400 metres freestyle at 2013 World Aquatics Championships to take a gap year. She chose to prepare herself for 200 metres backstroke competition to compete for Italy at World Championships. Anyway, with a last-minute decision, Pellegrini took part to 200 metres freestyle event at the 2013 World Championships and eventually won a silver medal with a time of 1:55.14, her best since Rome. Pellegrini won the silver medal behind Missy Franklin.

=== 2014 ===
At the 2014 European Aquatics Championships she repeated herself, winning the two gold medals of the previous championship, in the 200-metre freestyle (preceding Hosszú and Heemskerk) and in the 4 × 200 m freestyle relay, this one with an exceptional vamp over the Swedish team. She took part of 400-metre freestyle too, finishing fourth in the final, and this was her last international competition in that event.

=== 2015 World Championships ===
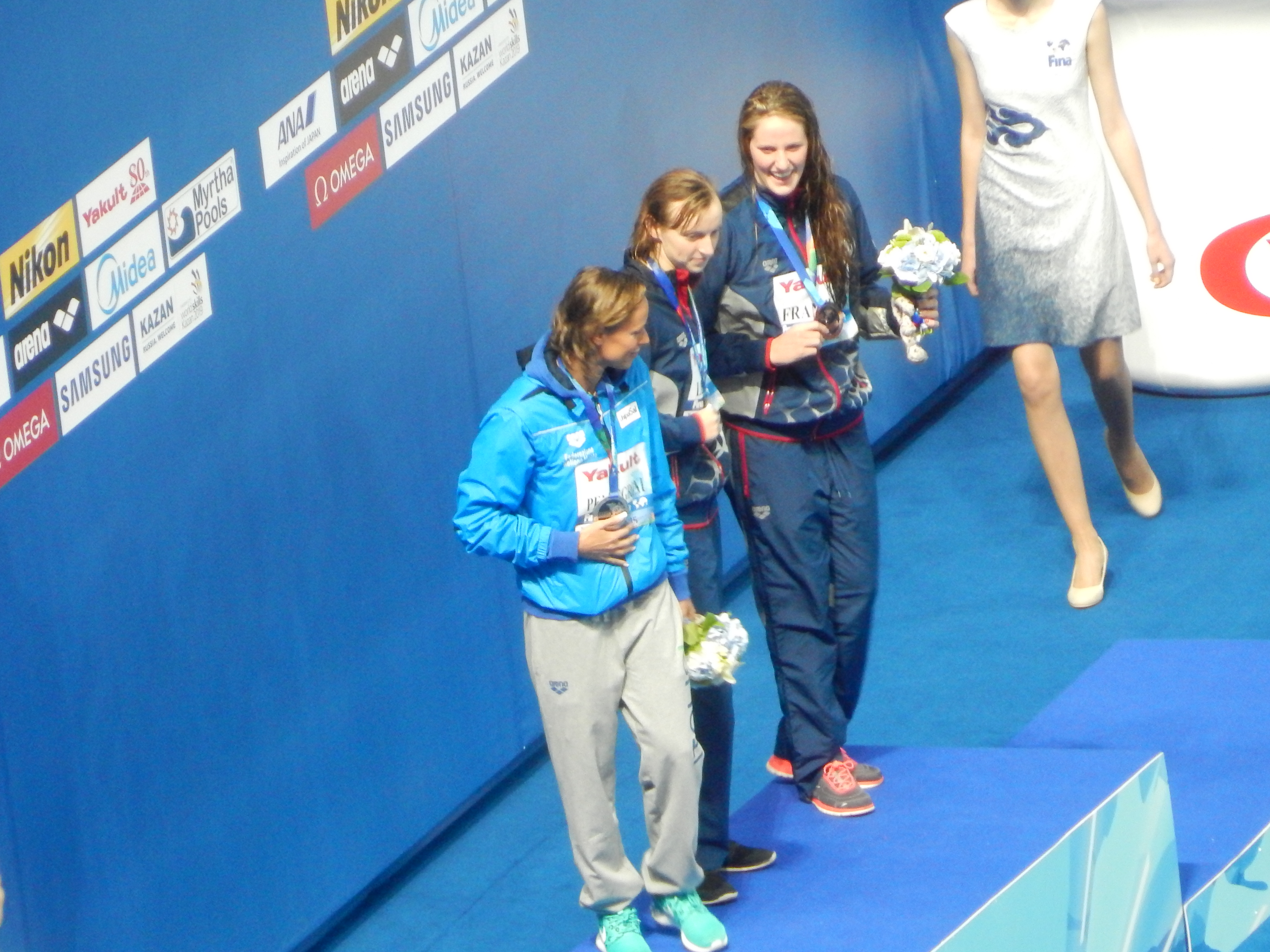
Pellegrini during Victory Ceremony of the 200 m freestyle at Kazan 2015

At the World Aquatics Championships held in Kazan (Russia) in 2015, she won the silver medal in 200 metres freestyle behind Katie Ledecky and ahead of Missy Franklin with a time of 1:55.32, and the silver medal in the 4 × 200 meter freestyle relay behind the United States. By winning the silver medal in the individual 200 metres freestyle, she became the first female swimmer in history to get a medal in the same event at six consecutive World Championships.

=== 2016 ===
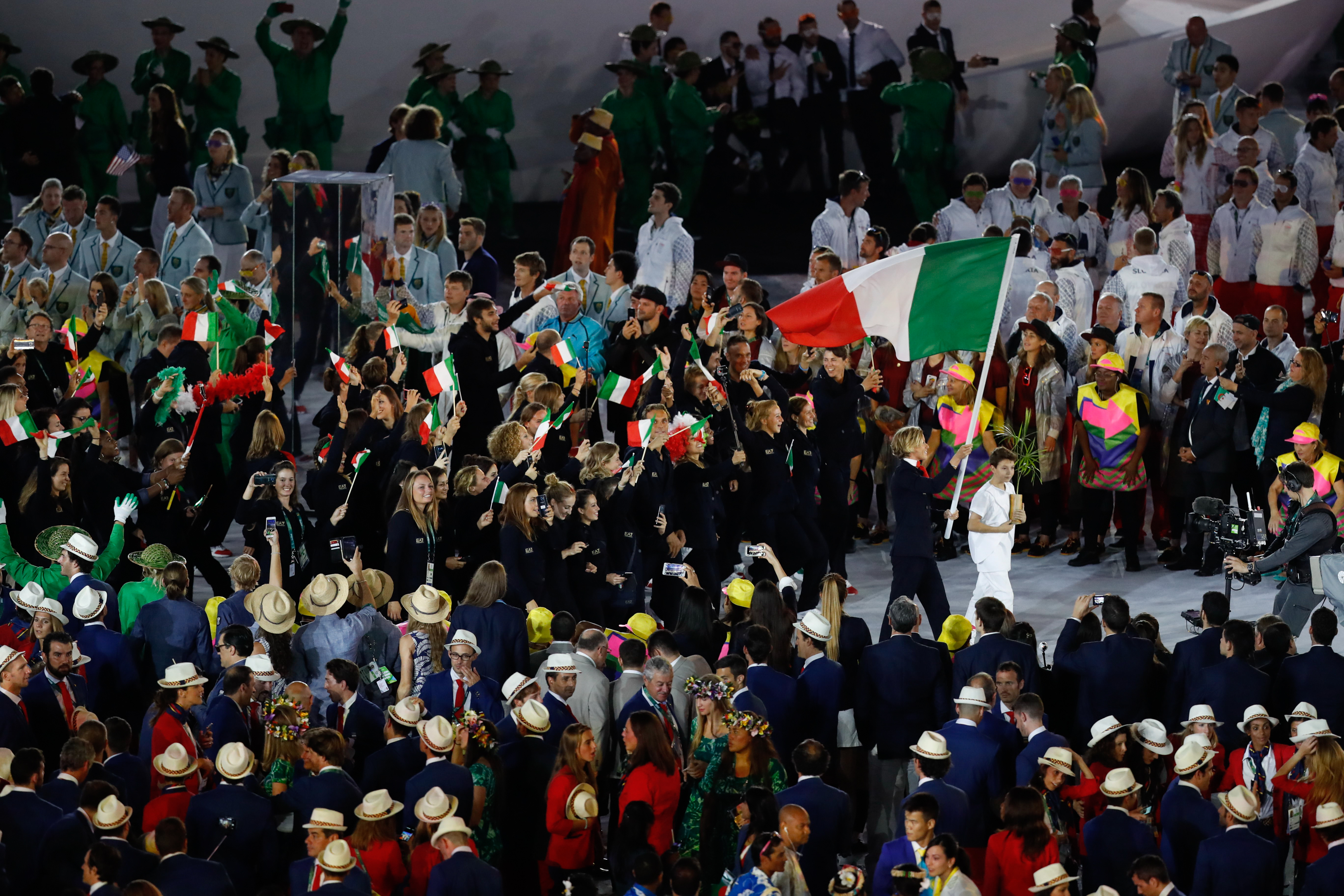
Pellegrini flagbearer for Italy at Rio de Janeiro 2016

In May 2016, she competed in European Championships in London and won the 200m freestyle with a time of 1:55.93, beating Femke Heemskerk from Holland. At the Settecolli, in June, she set the Italian record in the 100 freestyle (53:18), and she made a very interesting time in the 200 freestyle (1:54:55), her personal best with the textile suit.

At the 2016 Summer Olympics, Pellegrini was flagbearer for Italy, and competed in the following disciplines: 200m freestyle, and in the 4 × 100 and 4 × 200 m freestyle relays.

Pellegrini missed the podium during the competition, ranking fourth during the 200 m final. Eventually, she stated that failing to win an Olympic medal in the women's 200 metres freestyle final in Rio de Janeiro was so devastating for her that she may consider "making changes to her life".

Nevertheless, she got a prime redemption at the World Short Course Championships in Windsor (Ontario), because she won her first gold medal in the 200 freestyle, beating Katinka Hosszú.

=== 2017 ===
Pellegrini competed in a Milan meet on 12 March 2017 and finished first in 100 m freestyle with 54.77 and second in 100 m backstroke with 1:01.59. She competed in Indiana 2017 Arena Pro Swim Series in 2–4 March 2017 and won gold in 200 m freestyle with a time of 1:56.07. At the World Aquatics Championships held in Budapest, she won the gold medal in 200 metres freestyle ahead of both Katie Ledecky and Emma McKeon with a time of 1:54.73. This was Ledecky's first loss at a major event. By winning the gold medal in the individual 200 metres freestyle, she became the first swimmer ever to get a medal in the same event at seven consecutive World Championships. She competed in the 100 metres freestyle too.

At the European Championships in Copenhagen in December 2017 she competed individually in the 100 m freestyle (finished 7th), in the 100 m backstroke (eliminated in semifinal 2) and swam in the 4x50m freestyle relay final for Italy (team disqualified).

=== 2018, the sabbatical year ===
After winning her seventh consecutive medal at the World championships of Budapest 2017 Pellegrini took a sabbatical with milder training and partial abandonment of 200m freestyle.

We continue along the same path at the following season’s European Long Course Championships in Glasgow, where she finished fifth in the 100 m freestyle final and recorded several near-podium relay results. However, Pellegrini also appeared to arrive at the event short of her best form.

=== 2019 ===
Pellegrini won the gold medal (her fourth overall) in the 200 m freestyle race at the 2019 World Aquatics Championships held at Gwangju, with a time of 1:54.22, before Ariarne Titmus and Sarah Sjöström, taking advantage of Katie Ledecky, Emma McKeon and Taylor Ruck's withdrawals in the event, and so improving her record of being the one, among female and male swimmers, to achieve eight podiums in the same event during eight consecutive editions of the World Championships earning the title of 9th-most decorated swimmer history with individuals medals alone. She didn't go beyond the heats in the 50 metres freestyle and in the 100 metres freestyle. She took part in the finals of the 4×100-metre mixed freestyle relay and the 4 × 100 m medley relay.

=== 2021 ===
In May, Pellegrini competed at the European Championships in Budapest, where she won double silver medal respectively in the 200 m freestyle and in the 4 × 200 m mixed freestyle, and a triple bronze medal in the 4 × 200 m freestyle, in the 4 × 100 m mixed freestyle and in the 4 × 100 m medley.

At the 2020 Summer Olympics in Tokyo, she qualified for the final of the 200 metre freestyle. This made her the second swimmer in history (after Michael Phelps) to qualify for the final of the same event five times.

Pellegrini announced that she would retire at the conclusion of her third ISL season. Her final race as a professional was in her home country in Riccione on 30 Nov 2021.

== Celebrity ==
In August 2015, a section of the Lungomare delle Stelle of Jesolo was named after Federica Pellegrini and, as per tradition, the cast of the athlete's hands was made, preserved in the museum Kursaal of the city.

== Filmography ==
From 2019 to 2022 she was a judge on the talent show Italia's Got Talent , broadcast on TV8 and Sky Uno. Since October 2021 she has hosted some episodes of Le Iene with Nicola Savino. In October 2022 she was one of the contestants in the tenth edition of Peking Express, paired with her husband Matteo Giunta. In September 2024 she participated in "Ballando con le Stelle" Italy's version of Dancing with the Stars with her partner dancer Angelo Madonia.

=== Television programs ===
Year	Title	Network	Role
2019-2022	Italia's Got Talent	Sky Uno and TV8	
2021	Le Iene	Italia 1	co-host
2022	Peking Express	Sky Uno and TV8	contestant with her husband Matteo Giunta
2024	Ballando con le Stelle	RAI 1	dancer with various professional dancers Angelo Madonia, Samuel Peron and Pasquale La Rocca and with her husband Matteo Giunta.

=== Web shows ===
Year	Title	Role	Notes	Ref.
2026	Physical 100: Italy	Contestant		

== Personal life ==
From August 2011 to late 2016, Pellegrini was in a relationship with swimmer Filippo Magnini, having previously been engaged to another teammate, Luca Marin.

On 30 October 2021, Pellegrini announced her engagement to her long-time coach Matteo Giunta. They married at San Zaccaria, Venice, on 27 August 2022. On January 3, 2024, they had a baby girl named Matilde.

== Personal bests ==
Pellegrini currently holds 2 European records (ER) and 11 National records (NR). Her personal bests are (as of 1 December 2025):

Event	Long course (year)	Short course (year)
50 m freestyle	24.92 (2019)	24.55 (2017)
100 m freestyle	53.18 (2016)	52.10 (2019)
200 m freestyle	1:52.98 (2009)	1:51.17 (2009)
400 m freestyle	3:59.15 (2009)	3:57.59 (2011)
800 m freestyle	8:24.99 (2010)	8:15.20 (2010)
50 m backstroke	28.53 (2018)	30.01 (2003)
100 m backstroke	1.00.03 (2018)	57.55 (2018)
200 m backstroke	2:08.05 (2013)	2:03.75 (2013)
50 m butterfly	28.46 (2015)	28.59 (2005)
100 m butterfly	1:00.17 (2015)	1:00.39 (2015)
200 m butterfly	2:12.96 (2015)	2:08.69 (2013)
100 m medley		1:04.62 (2003)
200 m medley	2:17.25 (2009)	2:12.20 (2015)
4 × 50 m freestyle relay		1:35.61 (2016)
4 × 100 m freestyle relay	3:35.90 (2016)	3:29.48 (2014)
4 × 100 m mixed freestyle relay	3:24.55 (2016)	
4 × 200 m freestyle relay	7:46.57 (2009)	7:43.18 (2018)
4 × 200 m mixed freestyle relay	7:32.37 (2018)	
4 × 50 m medley relay		1:45.84 (2019)
4 × 100 m medley relay	3:56.50 (2019)	3:51.38 (2018)
4 × 100 m mixed medley relay	3:43.27 (2019)	

== International championships (50 m) ==
Did not compete

Meet	100 free	200 free	400 free	800 free	200 back	4 × 100 free	4 × 200 free	4 × 100 medley	4 × 100 mixed free	4 × 100 mixed med	4 × 200 mixed free
WC 2003						8th^{[a]}					not scheduled
EC 2004		4th				5th		4th			not scheduled
OG 2004	10th	2nd place, silver medalist(s)				10th		DSQ(h)			not scheduled
WC 2005	10th	2nd place, silver medalist(s)						5th			not scheduled
EC 2006		heats^{[b]}				6th	5th	DSQ(h)			not scheduled
WC 2007		3rd place, bronze medalist(s)	5th				13th	10th			not scheduled
EC 2008		DSQ(h)	1st place, gold medalist(s)			2nd place, silver medalist(s)	3rd place, bronze medalist(s)				not scheduled
OG 2008		1st place, gold medalist(s)	5th			10th	4th	14th			not scheduled
WC 2009		1st place, gold medalist(s)	1st place, gold medalist(s)				4th				not scheduled
EC 2010		1st place, gold medalist(s)		3rd place, bronze medalist(s)							not scheduled
WC 2011		1st place, gold medalist(s)	1st place, gold medalist(s)				13th	14th			not scheduled
EC 2012		1st place, gold medalist(s)	10th			3rd place, bronze medalist(s)	1st place, gold medalist(s)				not scheduled
OG 2012		5th	5th			12th	7th	11th			not scheduled
WC 2013		2nd place, silver medalist(s)			9th	10th	7th	DSQ(h)			not scheduled
EC 2014		1st place, gold medalist(s)	4th			3rd place, bronze medalist(s)	1st place, gold medalist(s)			5th	not scheduled
WC 2015		2nd place, silver medalist(s)				6th	2nd place, silver medalist(s)		5th		not scheduled
EC 2016		1st place, gold medalist(s)				2nd place, silver medalist(s)	5th		2nd place, silver medalist(s)	2nd place, silver medalist(s)	not scheduled
OG 2016		4th				6th	13th	8th			not scheduled
WC 2017	15th	1st place, gold medalist(s)				10th		8th	5th	8th	not scheduled
EC 2018	5th					5th		4th	4th	5th	
WC 2019	22nd	1st place, gold medalist(s)								6th	not scheduled
EC 2021		2nd place, silver medalist(s)				6th	3rd place, bronze medalist(s)	3rd place, bronze medalist(s)	3rd place, bronze medalist(s)		2nd place, silver medalist(s)
OG 2021	DNS	7th					DSQ	6th		4th	

^{a} Pellegrini swam only in the heats
^{b} Pellegrini qualified from the heats, but scratched the semi-finals

== National championships ==
Pellegrini won 129 national swimming championships (both individual and relay races), in absolute (24), winter (38) and spring (66) editions

Year	Edition	freestyle 50 m	freestyle 100 m	freestyle 200 m	freestyle 400 m	freestyle 800 m	freestyle 4 × 50 m	freestyle 4 × 100 m	freestyle 4 × 200 m	backstroke 100 m	mixed 4 × 50 m	mixed 4×100 m	backstroke 200 m
2002	Absolute	-	-	3	-	-	-	-	-	-	-	-	-
2002	Winter	-	2	-	-	-	-	-	-	-	-	-	-
2003	Spring	2	1	3	-	-	-	-	-	-	-	-	-
2003	Winter	2	1	1	-	-	1	-	-	-	1	-	-
2004	Spring	1	1	1	-	-	-	1	1	-	-	1	-
2004	Absolute	2	1	1	1	-	-	1	1	-	-	1	-
2004	Winter	2	1	1	-	-	2	-	-	-	1	-	-
2005	Spring	-	1	1	1	-	-	3	-	-	-	1	-
2005	Absolute	-	1	1	1	-	-	1	2	-	-	1	-
2005	Winter	-	2	1	1	3	2	-	-	-	1	-	-
2006	Spring	-	1	1	2	-	-	1	3	-	-	1	-
2006	Winter	-	-	1	1	-	-	-	-	-	-	-	-
2007	Spring	-	1	1	1	-	-	2	1	-	-	1	-
2007	Absolute	-	-	1	1	1	-	1	2	-	-	1	-
2007	Winter	-	-	1	1	-	-	-	-	-	-	-	-
2008	Spring	-	2	-	-	-	-	3	1	-	-	1	-
2008	Absolute	-	-	-	1	-	-	-	3	-	-	2	-
2008	Winter	-	-	2	-	-	-	-	-	-	-	-	-
2009	Spring	-	1	1	-	-	-	1	1	3	-	1	-
2009	Absolute	-	-	-	1	-	-	1	1	3	-	3	-
2010	Spring	-	-	1	1	1	-	1	1	-	-	1	-
2010	Winter	-	-	1	-	-	1	-	-	-	1	-	-
2011	Spring	-	1	1	1	1	-	3	-	-	-	1	-
2011	Absolute	-	-	-	1	-	1	-	-	-	2	-	-
2011	Winter	-	-	1	1	-	-	1	-	-	-	1	-
2012	Spring	-	1	1	1	-	-	2	-	-	-	1	-
2012	Winter	-	-	-	-	-	-	2	-	-	-	1	-
2013	Spring	-	-	1	-	-	-	2	2	1	-	2	1
2013	Winter	-	-	-	-	-	-	1	-	-	-	2	1
2014	Spring	-	-	1	1	-	-	3	1	-	-	2	1
2014	Winter	-	-	-	-	-	-	2	-	-	-	1	-
2015	Spring	-	-	-	3	-	-	2	1	-	-	1	-
2015	Winter	-	-	1	-	-	-	1	-	-	-	1	-
2016	Spring	–	1	1	-	-	-	1	1	-	-	1	-
2016	Winter	–	1	1	-	-	-	2	-	-	-	1	-
2017	Spring	–	1	1	-	-	-	2	1	3	-	1	–
2017	Winter	2	1	-	-	-	2	-	-	-	1	-	–
2018	Spring	-	1	-	-	-	-	2	-	1	-	2	–
2018	Winter	–	1	1	–	–	2	–	–	–	–	–	–
2019	Spring	–	1	1	–	–	–	–	2	–	–	–	–
2019	Winter	2	1	1	–	–	–	–	–	–	–	–	–
2020	Absolute	2	1	1	–	–	–	–	-	–	–	–	–
2020	Winter	3	1	1	–	–	–	–	–	–	–	–	–
2021	Spring	2	1	1	–	–	–	–	–	–	–	–	–
2021	Winter	–	–	1	–	–	–	–	–	–	–	–	–

== Awards and honours ==
- Swimming World – Female World Swimmer of the Year (2009)
- Swimming World – Female European Swimmer of the Year (2009–2011)
- International Swimming Hall of Fame inductee (2025)

== See also ==
- List of Olympic medalists in swimming (women)
- List of World Aquatics Championships medalists in swimming (women)
- Italian sportswomen multiple medalists at Olympics and World Championships
- Italian swimmers multiple medalists at the international competitions
- World record progression 200 metres freestyle
- World record progression 400 metres freestyle

Records
Preceded by Franziska van Almsick; Laure Manaudou	Women's 200-metre freestyle world record holder (long course); 27 March 2007 – 28 March 2007; 11 August 2008–26 July 2023	Succeeded by Laure Manaudou; Mollie O'Callaghan
Preceded by Coralie Balmy	Women's 200-metre freestyle world record holder (short course); 14 December 2008 – 7 December 2014	Succeeded by Sarah Sjöström
Preceded by Joanne Jackson	Women's 400-metre freestyle world record holder (long course); 27 June 2009 – August 2014	Succeeded by Katie Ledecky
Awards
Preceded by Stephanie Rice	World Swimmer of the Year; 2009	Succeeded by Rebecca Soni
Preceded by Rebecca Adlington	European Swimmer of the Year; 2009–2011	Succeeded by Ranomi Kromowidjojo
Preceded by Valentina Vezzali; Francesca Schiavone; Sofia Goggia	Italian Sportswoman of the Year; 2008–2009; 2011; 2019	Succeeded by Francesca Schiavone; Elisa Di Francisca; Federica Brignone
Olympic Games
Preceded by Valentina Vezzali	Flagbearer for Italy; Rio de Janeiro 2016	Succeeded by Jessica Rossi & Elia Viviani
