= Eadie Wetzel =

American freestyle swimmer

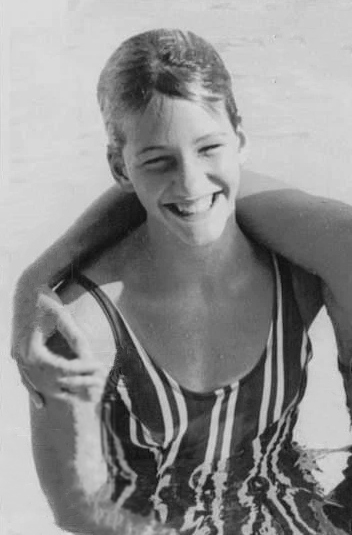
- Wetzel in 1967

Personal information
- Born: 1952 Evanston, Illinois, U.S.
- Died: January 10, 2015 (aged 62–63)

Sport
- Sport: Swimming
- Strokes: Freestyle

Eadie Wetzel Davis (1952 – January 10, 2015) was an American freestyle swimmer. In August 1968 she set a world record in the 200 m event and was selected for the 1968 Olympic team, but she did not compete at the Olympics.

Wetzel was born to Ross and Janice Wetzel and had a sister Susan and a brother Rick. Her parents brought her to a swimming club as a child to quench her hyperactivity. She later studied at the University of New Mexico on an athletic scholarship. There she met Erik Hansen, married him in 1976, and had two sons Whitney and Casey Hansen. She married a second time in 2011, to Mike Davis. She died four years later from amyotrophic lateral sclerosis.
