= National Bank of New Zealand Ltd v Eadie =

- Court: Court of Appeal of New Zealand
- Full case name: National Bank of New Zealand Ltd v Eadie
- Decided: 25 February 2003
- Transcript: http://www.nzlii.org/cgi-bin/sinodisp/nz/cases/NZCA/2003/32.html?query=eadie

Court membership
- Judges sitting: Keith J, Blanchard J, McGrath J

National Bank of New Zealand Ltd v Eadie is a cited case in New Zealand regarding the element of inducement for misrepesenation actions.
