= James Eadie (footballer) =

Scottish footballer

Personal information
- Full name: James Eadie
- Place of birth: Scotland
- Positions: Wing half; full back

Senior career*
Years	Team	Apps	(Gls)
1900–1905	Queen's Park	70	(0)
- * Club domestic league appearances and goals

James Eadie was a Scottish amateur footballer who played as a wing half and full back in the Scottish League for Queen's Park.

== Personal life ==
Eadie had three brothers who each played football – Alexander, David and William.

== Career statistics ==
Appearances and goals by club, season and competition
Club	Season	League			Scottish Cup		Other		Total	
Club	Season	Division	Apps	Goals	Apps	Goals	Apps	Goals	Apps	Goals
Queen's Park	1900–01	Scottish First Division	7	0	1	0	1 (Note: Appearance in Glasgow Merchants Charity Cup)	0	9	0
Queen's Park	1901–02	Scottish First Division	15	0	2	0	3 (Note: 2 appearances in Glasgow Cup, 1 appearance in Glasgow International Exhibition Cup)	0	20	0
Queen's Park	1902–03	Scottish First Division	1	0	0	0	0	0	1	0
Queen's Park	1903–04	Scottish First Division	22	0	0	0	3	0	25	0
Queen's Park	1904–05	Scottish First Division	21	0	1	0	2 (Note: 1 appearance in Glasgow Cup, 1 appearance in Glasgow Merchants Charity Cup)	0	24	0
Queen's Park	1905–06	Scottish First Division	4	0	0	0	0	0	4	0
Career total			70	0	4	0	9	0	83	0
