= William Eadie (footballer) =

Scottish footballer

Personal information
- Date of birth: 14 June 1882
- Place of birth: Dunblane, Scotland
- Date of death: 23 April 1915 (aged 32)
- Place of death: near Saint-Julien, Belgium
- Position: Goalkeeper

Senior career*
Years	Team	Apps	(Gls)
1900–1903	Queen's Park	12	(0)
1906–	St Mirren	1	(0)
–1908	Dunblane		
1908–1911	Partick Thistle	5	(0)
1913	East Fife		
- * Club domestic league appearances and goals

William P. Eadie (14 June 1882 – 23 June 1915), also known as William Prince, was a Scottish professional footballer who played as a goalkeeper in the Scottish League for Queen's Park, St Mirren and Partick Thistle.

== Personal life ==
Eadie was born in Dunblane, Scotland had three brothers who each played football – James (Dunblane, Queen's Park), David and Alexander (both Strathallan). As of 1901, he was working as a draper's assistant. On 20 March 1914, Eadie emigrated to Canada. One month after the outbreak of the First World War, Eadie enlisted as a sergeant in the 10th Battalion of the Canadian Expeditionary Force at CFB Valcartier. He enlisted under the name of William Prince. Eadie was killed in action near Saint-Julien, Belgium on 23 April 1915 and is commemorated on the Menin Gate and the Saint Julien Memorial.

== Career statistics ==
Appearances and goals by club, season and competition
Club	Season	League			Scottish Cup		Total	
Club	Season	Division	Apps	Goals	Apps	Goals	Apps	Goals
Queen's Park	1902–03	Scottish First Division	2	0	0	0	2	0
Queen's Park	1904–05	Scottish First Division	8	0	1	0	9	0
Queen's Park	1905–06	Scottish First Division	2	0	0	0	2	0
Queen's Park	Total		12	0	1	0	13	0
St Mirren	1906–07	Scottish First Division	1	0	0	0	1	0
Partick Thistle	1908–09	Scottish First Division	5	0	0	0	5	0
Career total			18	0	1	0	19	0

== Honours ==
Dunblane

- Perthshire Cup: 1905–06
