= Paulina Barzycka =

Polish swimmer (born 1986)

Personal information
- Born: 18 March 1986 Lublin, Poland
- Height: 1.81 m (5 ft 11 in)
- Weight: 67 kg (148 lb)

Sport
- Sport: Swimming
- Club: UTS Orlik Lublin/Olimpia Lublin
Medal record
Women's swimming
Representing Poland
European Championships (SC)
Bronze medal – third place	2005 Trieste	200 m freestyle
European Championships (LC)
Bronze medal – third place	2006 Budapest	4×200 m freestyle

Paulina Barzycka (born 18 March 1986) is a retired Polish swimmer who won two bronze medals at European Aquatics Championships, short course (2005) and long course (2006). She also competed in four freestyle events at the 2004 and 2008 Summer Olympics. Her best achievement was fourth place in the 200 m freestyle in 2004, missing a bronze medal by 0.17 seconds.

Barzycka started swimming by chance – her physician recommended exercises in water to correct a spine defect. This defect troubled her later and had to be operated in January 2008, before her second Olympics. She retired after the games to become a swimming coach.

She graduated from the Academy of Physical Education in Biała Podlaska.
