= Swimming at the 2007 World Aquatics Championships – Women's 200 metre freestyle =

The Women's 200m Freestyle at the 2007 World Aquatics Championships took place on 27 March (prelims & semifinals) and 28 March (finals) at Rod Laver Arena in Melbourne, Australia.

The World Record in the event was lowered twice during the competition, first by Italy's Federica Pellegrini in semifinals, and then by France's Laure Manaudou in finals.

The existing records at the start of the competition were:

- World Record (WR): 1:56.64, Franziska van Almsick (Germany), 3 August 2002 in Berlin, Germany.
- Championship Record (CR): 1:56.78, Franziska van Almsick (Germany), Rome 1994 (Sep.6.1994).

== Results ==
=== Final ===
Place	Name	Nationality	Time	Note
1st	Laure Manaudou	France	1:55.52	WR
2nd	Annika Lurz	Germany	1:55.68	NR
3rd	Federica Pellegrini	Italy	1:56.97	
4th	Katie Hoff	USA	1:57.09	AM
5th	Josefin Lillhage	Sweden	1:57.90	
6th	Dana Vollmer	USA	1:58.30	
7th	Caitlin McClatchey	Great Britain	1:59.28	
8th	Otylia Jędrzejczak	Poland	2:01.53	

=== Semifinals ===
Rank	Name	Nationality	Time	Note
1	Federica Pellegrini	Italy	1:56.47	Q WR
2	Annika Lurz	Germany	1:56.67	Q
3	Otylia Jędrzejczak	Poland	1:57.19	Q
4	Katie Hoff	USA	1:57.29	Q AM
5	Laure Manaudou	France	1:57.30	Q
6	Josefin Lillhage	Sweden	1:57.78	Q, NR
7	Caitlin McClatchey	Great Britain	1:57.86	Q
8	Dana Vollmer	USA	1:58.71	Q
9	Inge Dekker	Netherlands	1:59.04	
10	Bronte Barratt	Australia	1:59.12	
11	Melanie Marshall	Great Britain	1:59.14	
12	Linda Mackenzie	Australia	1:59.25	
13	Ida Marko-Varga	Sweden	1:59.56	
14	Meike Freitag	Germany	1:59.60	
15	Maki Mita	Japan	2:00.29	
16	Paulina Barzycka	Poland	2:01.35	

=== Prelims ===
Rank	Name	Nationality	Time	Note
1	Laure Manaudou	France	1:57.66	Q
2	Katie Hoff	USA	1:58.17	Q
3	Josefin Lillhage	Sweden	1:58.24	Q
4	Dana Vollmer	USA	1:58.26	Q
5	Otylia Jędrzejczak	Poland	1:58.57	Q
6	Linda Mackenzie	Australia	1:58.80	Q
7	Federica Pellegrini	Italy	1:58.83	Q
8	Caitlin McClatchey	Great Britain	1:59.14	Q
9	Meike Freitag	Germany	1:59.24	Q
10	Bronte Barratt	Australia	1:59.26	Q
11	Annika Lurz	Germany	1:59.42	Q
12	Melanie Marshall	Great Britain	1:59.59	Q
13	Maki Mita	Japan	1:59.72	Q
14	Ida Marko-Varga	Sweden	1:59.74	Q
15	Inge Dekker	Netherlands	1:59.91	Q
16	Paulina Barzycka	Poland	1:59.94	Q
17	Camelia Potec	Romania	2:00.05	
18	Yang Yu	China	2:00.10	
19	Helen Norfolk	New Zealand	2:00.21	
20	Pang Jiaying	China	2:00.71	
21	Aurore Mongel	France	2:01.23	
22	Norie Urabe	Japan	2:01.25	
23	Julia Wilkinson	Canada	2:01.32	
24	Flavia Zoccari	Italy	2:01.49	
25	Katinka Hosszú	Hungary	2:02.00	
26	Melanie Nocher	Ireland	2:02.04	
26	Maria Fuster Martinez	Spain	2:02.04	
28	Julie Hjorth-Hansen	Denmark	2:02.17	
29	Linda Bank	Netherlands	2:02.35	
30	Ionela Cozma	Romania	2:02.60	
31	Keo Ra Lee	South Korea	2:02.61	
32	Chin Kuei Yang	Chinese Taipei	2:02.68	
33	Micha Jensen	Denmark	2:02.75	
34	Hanna-Maria Seppälä	Finland	2:02.81	
35	Melania Felicitas Costa Schmid	Spain	2:02.84	
36	Wendy Trott	South Africa	2:03.09	
37	Geneviève Saumur	Canada	2:03.24	
38	Sascha Van Den Branden	Belgium	2:03.62	
39	Melissa Ingram	New Zealand	2:03.80	
40	Erin Volcán	Venezuela	2:04.00	
41	Elina Partoka	Estonia	2:04.02	
42	Cecilia Biagioli	Argentina	2:04.24	
43	Maria Albert	Estonia	2:04.39	
44	Jana Myskova	Czech Republic	2:04.61	
45	Ji Eun Lee	South Korea	2:04.74	
46	Hang Yu Sze	Hong Kong	2:04.95	
47	Heysi Villarreal Navarro	Cuba	2:05.68	
48	Maroua Mathlouthi	Tunisia	2:05.69	
49	Andreina Pinto	Venezuela	2:05.94	
50	Pin Chieh Nieh	Chinese Taipei	2:06.29	
51	Jiratida Phinyosophon	Thailand	2:06.30	
52	Anna Stylianou	Cyprus	2:06.47	
53	Ting Wen Quah	Singapore	2:06.69	
54	Erica Totten	Philippines	2:06.76	
55	Alexia Pamela Benitez Quijada	El Salvador	2:06.77	
56	Ming Xiu Ong	Malaysia	2:07.16	
57	Mylene Ong	Singapore	2:07.29	
58	Kimberly Eeson	Zimbabwe	2:07.36	
59	Sarah Yasmine Chahed	Tunisia	2:07.93	
60	Nimitta Thaveesupsoonthorn	Thailand	2:08.56	
61	Raffaella Rodoni Palma	Chile	2:08.97	
62	Maria Alejandra Torres	Peru	2:09.66	
63	Loren Bahamonde	Ecuador	2:09.92	
64	Maria Gandionco	Philippines	2:10.34	
65	Nicole Marmol Gilbert	Ecuador	2:10.46	
66	Jutta Thomsen	Faroe Islands	2:10.81	
67	Anna-Liza Mopio-Jane	Papua New Guinea	2:10.87	
68	Fiorella Gomez-Sanchez	Peru	2:11.05	
69	Davina Mangion	Malta	2:11.22	
70	Nancy Suryaatmadja	Indonesia	2:11.55	
71	Tuesday Watts	Grenada	2:12.10	
72	Natasha Moodie	Jamaica	2:12.26	
73	Mona Simonsen	Faroe Islands	2:12.45	
74	Matana Wellman	Zambia	2:12.64	
75	Sharon Paola Fajardo Sierra	Honduras	2:12.73	
76	Jonay Briedenhann	Namibia	2:12.93	
77	Noufissa Chbihi	Morocco	2:13.44	
78	Khadija Ciss	Senegal	2:13.50	
79	Cai Lin Khoo	Malaysia	2:13.63	
80	Marianella Quesada Barrantes	Costa Rica	2:13.64	
81	Talisa Pace	Malta	2:15.08	
82	Marike Meyer	Namibia	2:15.47	
83	Pooja Raghava Alva	India	2:16.22	
84	Rachel Ah Koy	Fiji	2:17.31	
85	Marie Laura Meza Peraza	Costa Rica	2:17.56	
86	Shannon Austin	Seychelles	2:17.60	
87	Nicole Ellsworth	Papua New Guinea	2:18.20	
88	Ngozi Monu	Nigeria	2:19.45	
89	Hiba Bashouti	Jordan	2:19.73	
90	Chinyere Pigot	Suriname	2:20.28	
91	Tojohanitra Andriamanjatoprimamama	Madagascar	2:20.40	
92	Kshipra Mahajan	India	2:20.65	
93	Man Wai Fong	Macau	2:20.73	
94	Yulduz Kuchkarova	Uzbekistan	2:22.11	
95	Frances Nagatalevu	Fiji	2:23.07	
96	Prisca Rose	Mauritius	2:23.36	
97	Sarah Elizabeth Johnson	Northern Mariana Islands	2:23.42	
98	Mirjana Stojanova	Macedonia	2:23.86	
99	Anouchka Diane Etiennette	Mauritius	2:24.61	
100	Herinantenaina Ravoajanahary	Madagascar	2:24.64	
101	Binta Zahra Diop	Senegal	2:26.26	
102	Pina Ercolano	Kenya	2:27.59	
103	Patricia Wellman	Zambia	2:28.00	
104	Hussain Aminath Rouya	Maldives	2:33.98	
105	Amber Sikosang Yobech	Palau	2:38.14	
106	Maria Gibbons	Palau	2:50.04	
--	Katerina Izmailova	Tajikistan	DNS	
--	Ogom Obianugba	Nigeria	DNS	
--	Miriam Hatamleh	Jordan	DQ	
