= Johnny Arcilla =

Filipino tennis player (born 1980)

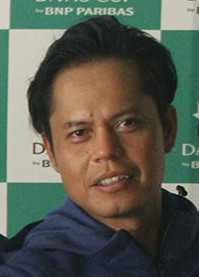
- Arcilla in 2025
- Country (sports): Philippines
- Born: February 15, 1980 (age 46) Butuan, Philippines
- Plays: Right-handed

Singles
- Highest ranking: No. 1288 (2 August 2010)
- Current ranking: No. 1728
Medal record
Men's Tennis
Representing Philippines
Southeast Asian Games
| Gold medal – first place | 2005 Manila | Team |
| Gold medal – first place | 2009 Vientiane | Team |
| Bronze medal – third place | 2001 Kuala Lumpur | Team |
| Bronze medal – third place | 2007 Nakhon Ratchasima | Team |
Afro-Asian Games
| Silver medal – second place | 2003 Hyderabad | Singles |
| Bronze medal – third place | 2003 Hyderabad | Doubles |
| Bronze medal – third place | 2003 Hyderabad | Team |
| Bronze medal – third place | 2003 Hyderabad | Mixed doubles |
- Last updated on: February 3, 2015.

Johnny Arcilla (born February 15, 1980) is a Filipino tennis player who represents the Philippines in international competition. Arcilla is a 10-time champion at the Philippine Columbian Association Open Tennis Championship.

== Early life ==
As young as five years old, Arcilla started as a ball boy in Butuan. His father served as his only coach and he would play on the tennis court located just behind his house. At age seven, he began competing in tournaments and was scouted by Milo at age 10. He later moved to Manila by himself at age 12 as most tournaments were held in Manila.

== Career ==
=== Tennis ===
Arcilla first won his first men's singles title at the age of 21 at the Philippine Columbian Association Open Tennis Championship in 2001. Arcilla would later go on to win the tournament a further nine times between 2006 and 2022.

He won a bronze medal at the 2001 Southeast Asian Games in Kuala Lumpur, Malaysia. He was part of the Philippines team which reached the semi-final stage before losing to Indonesia.

Arcilla won four medals at the 2003 Afro-Asian Games in Hyderabad, India. In the men's singles, he came through from the first round to reach the final but lost in straight sets to Vijay Kannan of India and took home silver. In the men's doubles, Arcilla and partner Adelo Abadia lost at the semi-final stage to Mahesh Bhupathi and Rohan Bopanna of India and won a bronze medal. Alongside partner Anna-Patricia Santos, he again won bronze in the mixed doubles after losing to Rushmi Chakravarthi and Vishal Uppal of India in the semi-finals. In the men's team event, the Philippines lost to India in the semi-finals and Arcilla earned a third bronze medal.

=== Pickleball ===
As a pickleball player, Arcilla joins the Cebuana Lhuillier Gems for the inaugural season of the Pickle Yard Conference League (PYCL) in 2026.
