= Czarina Arevalo =

Filipino tennis player (born 1985)

- Full name: Czarina Mae Arevalo
- Country (sports): Philippines
- Born: 14 May 1985 (age 41) Ilocos Norte, Philippines
- Plays: Right-handed
- Prize money: $9,934

Singles
- Career record: 38–39
- Highest ranking: No. 582 (9 October 2006)

Doubles
- Career record: 20–30
- Highest ranking: No. 819 (18 December 2006)
Medal record
Southeast Asian Games
Silver medal – second place	1999 Bandar	Women's team
Bronze medal – third place	2001 Kuala Lumpur	Women's team
Bronze medal – third place	2003 Ho Chi Minh City	Women's team
Bronze medal – third place	2005 Manila	Women's team
Bronze medal – third place	2007 Nakhon Ratchasima	Women's team
Afro-Asian Games
Bronze medal – third place	2003 Hyderabad	Women's singles
Bronze medal – third place	2003 Hyderabad	Women's doubles
Bronze medal – third place	2003 Hyderabad	Mixed doubles
Bronze medal – third place	2003 Hyderabad	Women's team

Czarina Mae Arevalo (born 14 May 1985) is a Filipino former professional tennis player.

Born in Ilocos Norte, Arevalo competed for the Philippines Fed Cup team from 2000 to 2008, appearing in a record 32 ties. She won 14 singles and 11 doubles rubbers during her Fed Cup career (win-loss record of 25–28).

Arevalo represented her country at the 2003 Afro-Asian Games, 2006 Asian Games and in multiple editions of the Southeast Asian Games. She was a five-time Southeast Asian Games medalist.

== ITF finals ==
=== Singles (0–1) ===
Outcome	No.	Date	Tournament	Surface	Opponent	Score
Runner-up	1.	Nov 2005	ITF Manila 1, Philippines	Hard	(Hong Kong) Venise Chan	1–6, 4–6

=== Doubles (0–2) ===
Outcome	No.	Date	Tournament	Surface	Partner	Opponents	Score
Runner-up	1.	Nov 2003	ITF Manila 1, Philippines	Clay	(Philippines) Anna Patricia Santos	(United States) Julianna Gates (Poland) Monika Krauze	3–6, 2–6
Runner-up	2.	Nov 2009	ITF Manila 2, Philippines	Hard	(Germany) Katharina Lehnert	(South Korea) Han Na-lae (South Korea) Yoo Mi	0–6, 3–6
