= Tennis at the 2003 Afro-Asian Games =

- Date: 25–31 October
- Edition: 1st
- Location: SAAP Tennis Complex

Champions

Men's singles
- Vijay Kannan (IND)

Women's singles
- Sania Mirza (IND)

Men's doubles
- Mahesh Bhupathi / Rohan Bopanna (IND)

Women's doubles
- Rushmi Chakravarthi / Sania Mirza (IND)

Mixed doubles
- Mahesh Bhupathi / Sania Mirza (IND)

Men's team
- India

Women's team
- India
- Afro-Asian Games

The tennis competitions at the 2003 Afro-Asian Games in Hyderabad, India were held from October 25 to October 31 at the SAAP Tennis Complex. The events were held on grass courts.

All semifinal losers were awarded bronze medal. India was the most successful- it won gold medals in each tennis event. Then-16-year-old and rising Indian star on the professional tennis court, Sania Mirza, was the most victorious, winning four gold medals.

== Men's singles ==
=== Medalists ===
Event	Gold	Silver	Bronze
Men's singles	(India) Vijay Kannan (IND)	(Philippines) Johnny Arcilla (PHI)	(Democratic Republic of the Congo) Sonny Kayombo (COD)
Men's singles	(India) Vijay Kannan (IND)	(Philippines) Johnny Arcilla (PHI)	(Nigeria) Sunday Maku (NGR)

=== Seeds ===
1. (India) Prakash Amritraj (Quarterfinals, withdrew)
2. (India) Vijay Kannan (Champion, Gold Medalist)

3. (Philippines) Joseph Victorino (Quarterfinals)
4. (Nigeria) Abdul-Mumin Babalola (Quarterfinals)

=== Finals ===
Semifinals
(Democratic Republic of the Congo) Sonny Kayombo	7	4	1
(Philippines) Johnny Arcilla	5	6	6
(Nigeria) Sunday Maku	6	3	6^{4}
2	(India) Vijay Kannan	4	6	7^{7}

Final
(Philippines) Johnny Arcilla	1	1
2	(India) Vijay Kannan	6	6

=== Main draw ===
First Round
(Philippines) J Arcilla	7	6
(Sri Lanka) R de Silva	5	4

Quarterfinals
1	(India) P Amritraj
(Democratic Republic of the Congo) S Kayombo	w/o
(Philippines) J Arcilla	6	2	6
4	(Nigeria) A-M Babalola	3	6	3
3	(Philippines) J Victorino	6	4	6^{6}
(Nigeria) S Maku	1	6	7^{8}
(Sri Lanka) H Godamane	1	5
2	(India) V Kannan	6	7

Semifinals
(Democratic Republic of the Congo) S Kayombo	7	4	1
(Philippines) J Arcilla	5	6	6
(Nigeria) S Maku	6	3	6^{4}
2	(India) V Kannan	4	6	7^{7}

Final
(Philippines) J Arcilla	1	1
2	(India) V Kannan	6	6

== Men's doubles ==
=== Medalists ===
Event	Gold	Silver	Bronze
Men's doubles	(India) Mahesh Bhupathi (India) Rohan Bopanna (IND)	(India) Sunil-Kumar Sipaeya (India) Vinod Sridhar (IND)	(Philippines) Adelo Abadia (Philippines) Johnny Arcilla (PHI)
Men's doubles	(India) Mahesh Bhupathi (India) Rohan Bopanna (IND)	(India) Sunil-Kumar Sipaeya (India) Vinod Sridhar (IND)	(Nigeria) Abdul-Mumin Babalola (Nigeria) Sunday Maku (NGR)

=== Seeds ===
1. (India) Mahesh Bhupathi / (India) Rohan Bopanna (Champions, Gold Medalists)
2. (India) Sunil-Kumar Sipaeya / (India) Vinod Sridhar (Final, Silver Medalists)

3. (Philippines) Adelo Abadia / (Philippines) Johnny Arcilla (Semifinals, Bronze Medalists)
4. (Nigeria) Abdul-Mumin Babalola / (Nigeria) Sunday Maku (Semifinals, Bronze Medalists)

=== Main draw ===
- Only four teams in the draw

Semifinals
1	(India) Mahesh Bhupathi (India) Rohan Bopanna	6	6
3	(Philippines) Adelo Abadia (Philippines) Johnny Arcilla	3	2
4	(Nigeria) Abdul-Mumin Babalola (Nigeria) Sunday Maku	1	0
2	(India) Sunil-Kumar Sipaeya (India) Vinod Sridhar	6	6

Final
1	(India) Mahesh Bhupathi (India) Rohan Bopanna	6	3	6
2	(India) Sunil-Kumar Sipaeya (India) Vinod Sridhar	4	6	2

== Women's singles ==
=== Medalists ===
Event	Gold	Silver	Bronze
Women's singles	(India) Sania Mirza (IND)	(India) Rushmi Chakravarthi (IND)	(Philippines) Czarina Arevalo (PHI)
Women's singles	(India) Sania Mirza (IND)	(India) Rushmi Chakravarthi (IND)	(Indonesia) Sandy Gumulya (INA)

=== Seeds ===
1. (India) Sania Mirza (Champion, Gold Medalist)
2. (India) Rushmi Chakravarthi (Final, Silver Medalist)

3. (Indonesia) Sandy Gumulya (Semifinals, Bronze Medalist)
4. (Indonesia) Septi Mende (Quarterfinals)

=== Finals ===
Semifinals
1	(India) Sania Mirza	6	6
(Philippines) Czarina Arevalo	4	1
3	(Indonesia) Sandy Gumulya	3	6	3
2	(India) Rushmi Chakravarthi	6	2	6

Final
1	(India) Sania Mirza	7^{8}	6
2	(India) Rushmi Chakravarthi	6^{6}	3

=== Main draw ===
First Round
(Zimbabwe) F Masiyazi	2	4
(Senegal) K Berthe	6	6

Quarterfinals
1	(India) S Mirza	6	6
(Zimbabwe) F Mawisire	1	0
(Philippines) C Arevalo	6	7^{7}
4	(Indonesia) S Mende	1	6^{5}
3	(Indonesia) S Gumulya	6	7^{7}
(Nigeria) C Udofa	1	6^{2}
(Senegal) K Berthe	3	6^{2}
2	(India) R Chakravarthi	6	7^{7}

Semifinals
1	(India) S Mirza	6	6
(Philippines) C Arevalo	4	1
3	(Indonesia) S Gumulya	3	6	3
2	(India) R Chakravarthi	6	2	6

Final
1	(India) S Mirza	7^{8}	6
2	(India) R Chakravarthi	6^{6}	3

== Women's doubles ==
=== Medalists ===
Event	Gold	Silver	Bronze
Women's doubles	(India) Rushmi Chakravarthi (India) Sania Mirza (IND)	(Indonesia) Septi Mende (Indonesia) Maya Rosa Ariana Stefanie (INA)	(Philippines) Czarina Arevalo (Philippines) Anna-Patricia Santos (PHI)
Women's doubles	(India) Rushmi Chakravarthi (India) Sania Mirza (IND)	(Indonesia) Septi Mende (Indonesia) Maya Rosa Ariana Stefanie (INA)	(India) Sonal Phadke (India) Meghha Vakaria (IND)

=== Seeds ===
1. (India) Rushmi Chakravarthi / (India) Sania Mirza (Champions, Gold Medalists)
2. (India) Sonal Phadke / (India) Meghha Vakaria (Semifinals, Bronze Medalists)

3. (Indonesia) Septi Mende / (Indonesia) Maya Rosa Ariana Stefanie (Final, Silver Medalists)
4. (Philippines) Czarina Arevalo / (Philippines) Anna-Patricia Santos (Semifinals, Bronze Medalists)

=== Main draw ===
- Only six teams in the draw

Quarterfinals				Semifinals					Final
				1	(India) Rushmi Chakravarthi (India) Sania Mirza	6	6
	(Nigeria) Osaro Amadin (Nigeria) Clara Udofa	3	6^{5}	4	(Philippines) Czarina Arevalo (Philippines) Anna-Patricia Santos	4	0
4	(Philippines) Czarina Arevalo (Philippines) Anna-Patricia Santos	6	7^{7}						1	(India) Rushmi Chakravarthi (India) Sania Mirza	7^{7}	6
3	(Indonesia) Septi Mende (Indonesia) Maya Rosa Ariana Stefanie	6	6						3	(Indonesia) Septi Mende (Indonesia) Maya Rosa Ariana Stefanie	6^{2}	3
	(Zimbabwe) Fadzai Masiyazi (Zimbabwe) Fadzai Mawisire	1	2	3	(Indonesia) Septi Mende (Indonesia) Maya Rosa Ariana Stefanie	7	1	7
				2	(India) Sonal Phadke (India) Meghha Vakaria	5	6	5

== Mixed doubles ==
=== Medalists ===
Event	Gold	Silver	Bronze
Mixed doubles	(India) Sania Mirza (India) Mahesh Bhupathi (IND)	(India) Rushmi Chakravarthi (India) Vishal Uppal (IND)	(Philippines) Czarina Arevalo (Philippines) Adelo Abadia (PHI)
Mixed doubles	(India) Sania Mirza (India) Mahesh Bhupathi (IND)	(India) Rushmi Chakravarthi (India) Vishal Uppal (IND)	(Philippines) Anna-Patricia Santos (Philippines) Johnny Arcilla (PHI)

=== Seeds ===
1. (India) Sania Mirza / (India) Mahesh Bhupathi (Champions, Gold Medalists)
2. (India) Rushmi Chakravarthi / (India) Vishal Uppal (Final, Silver Medalists)

3. (Philippines) Czarina Arevalo / (Philippines) Adelo Abadia (Semifinals, Bronze Medalists)
4. (Philippines) Anna-Patricia Santos / (Philippines) Johnny Arcilla (Semifinals, Bronze Medalists)

=== Main draw ===
- Only six teams in the draw

Quarterfinals
(Nigeria) Clara Udofa (Nigeria) Sunday Maku	6^{5}	4
3	(Philippines) Czarina Arevalo (Philippines) Adelo Abadia	7^{7}	6
4	(Philippines) Anna-Patricia Santos (Philippines) Johnny Arcilla	3	6	6
(Nigeria) Osaro Amadin (Nigeria) Rotimi Jegede	6	3	2

Semifinals
1	(India) Sania Mirza (India) Mahesh Bhupathi	6	6
3	(Philippines) Czarina Arevalo (Philippines) Adelo Abadia	2	2
4	(Philippines) Anna-Patricia Santos (Philippines) Johnny Arcilla	7^{7}	4	4
2	(India) Rushmi Chakravarthi (India) Vishal Uppal	6^{5}	6	6

Final
1	(India) Sania Mirza (India) Mahesh Bhupathi	7	6
2	(India) Rushmi Chakravarthi (India) Vishal Uppal	6^{1}	3

== Men's team ==
=== Medalists ===
Event	Gold	Silver	Bronze
Men's Team	India; Prakash Amritraj; Rohan Bopanna; Vijay Kannan; Vishal Uppal	Nigeria; Abdul-Mumin Babalola; Sunday Maku	Philippines; Joseph Victorino; Johnny Arcilla; Adelo Abadia
Men's Team	India; Prakash Amritraj; Rohan Bopanna; Vijay Kannan; Vishal Uppal	Nigeria; Abdul-Mumin Babalola; Sunday Maku	Sri Lanka; Harshana Godamane; Rohan de Silva

=== Draw ===
Semifinals			Final
1	India	3
	Philippines	0	1	India	3
	Sri Lanka	1	2	Nigeria	0
2	Nigeria	2

== Women's team ==
=== Medalists ===
Event	Gold	Silver	Bronze
Women's Team	India; Rushmi Chakravarthi; Sania Mirza; Sonal Phadke; Meghha Vakaria	Nigeria; Osaro Amadin; Clara Udofa	Philippines; Czarina Arevalo; Anna-Patricia Santos
Women's Team	India; Rushmi Chakravarthi; Sania Mirza; Sonal Phadke; Meghha Vakaria	Nigeria; Osaro Amadin; Clara Udofa	Indonesia

=== Draw ===
Quarterfinals		Semifinals			Final
		1	India	2
			Nigeria	1
					1	India	3
Zimbabwe	0				2	Indonesia	0
Philippines	3		Philippines	1
		2	Indonesia	2
