= Sania Mirza =

Indian tennis player (born 1986)

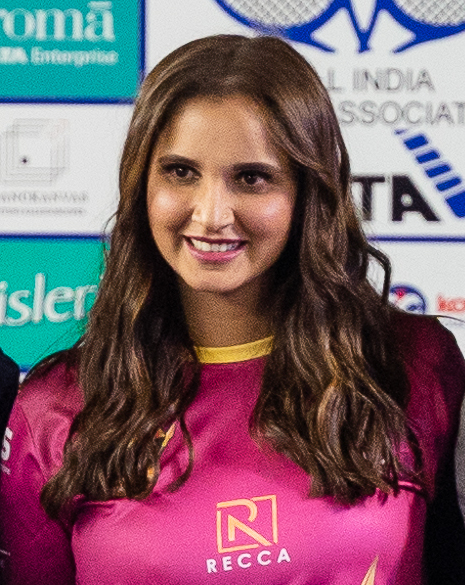
- Mirza in 2021
- Country (sports): India
- Residence: Hyderabad, India
- Born: 15 November 1986 (age 40) Mumbai, Maharashtra
- Height: 1.73 m (5 ft 8 in)
- Turned pro: February 2003
- Retired: February 2023
- Plays: Right-handed (two-handed backhand)
- College: St. Mary's College
- Prize money: US$ 7,265,246

Singles
- Career record: 271–161
- Career titles: 1
- Highest ranking: No. 27 (27 August 2007)

Grand Slam singles results
- Australian Open: 3R (2005, 2008)
- French Open: 2R (2007, 2011)
- Wimbledon: 2R (2005, 2007, 2008, 2009)
- US Open: 4R (2005)

Other tournaments
- Olympic Games: 1R (2008)

Doubles
- Career record: 536–248
- Career titles: 43
- Highest ranking: No. 1 (13 April 2015)

Grand Slam doubles results
- Australian Open: W (2016)
- French Open: F (2011)
- Wimbledon: W (2015)
- US Open: W (2015)

Other doubles tournaments
- Tour Finals: W (2014, 2015)
- Olympic Games: 2R (2008)

Mixed doubles
- Career titles: 3

Grand Slam mixed doubles results
- Australian Open: W (2009)
- French Open: W (2012)
- Wimbledon: SF (2022)
- US Open: W (2014)

Other mixed doubles tournaments
- Olympic Games: SF (2016)
Medal record
Representing India
Women's tennis
Asian Games
Gold medal – first place	2006 Doha	Mixed doubles
Gold medal – first place	2014 Incheon	Mixed doubles
Silver medal – second place	2006 Doha	Women's singles
Silver medal – second place	2006 Doha	Women's team
Silver medal – second place	2010 Guangzhou	Mixed doubles
Bronze medal – third place	2002 Busan	Mixed doubles
Bronze medal – third place	2010 Guangzhou	Women's singles
Bronze medal – third place	2014 Incheon	Women's doubles
Commonwealth Games
Silver medal – second place	2010 Delhi	Women's singles
Bronze medal – third place	2010 Delhi	Women's doubles
Afro-Asian Games
Gold medal – first place	2003 Hyderabad	Women's singles
Gold medal – first place	2003 Hyderabad	Women's doubles
Gold medal – first place	2003 Hyderabad	Mixed doubles
Gold medal – first place	2003 Hyderabad	Women's team

Sania Mirza ([ˈsaːnijaː ˈmirzaː]; born 15 November 1986) is an Indian former professional tennis player. A former doubles world No. 1, she won six major titles – three in women's doubles and three in mixed doubles. From 2003 until her retirement from singles in 2013, she was ranked by the Women's Tennis Association as the No. 1 Indian in singles. Throughout her career, Mirza has established herself as one of the most known, highest-paid, and influential athletes in India.

In singles, Mirza had wins over Svetlana Kuznetsova, Vera Zvonareva, and Marion Bartoli, as well as former world-number-ones Martina Hingis, Dinara Safina, and Victoria Azarenka. She is the highest-ranked Indian female player ever, peaking at world No. 27 in mid-2007. However, a major wrist injury caused her to shift to doubles. Mirza has achieved a number of firsts for women's tennis in India, including reaching the one million-US$ mark in career earnings (currently over US$7.2 million), winning a singles WTA Tour title, and winning a major title, as well as qualifying for (and eventually winning) the WTA Finals in 2014 in doubles partnering Cara Black, and defending her title the following year partnering Martina Hingis. Mirza retired from professional tennis in February 2023.

She is one of only two Indian women to win a WTA Tour title, and the only one to be ranked within the top 100 in singles. Mirza is the third Indian woman in the Open Era (after Nirupama Mankad and Nirupama Sanjeev, and the second in singles after Sanjeev) to contest and win a match at a major, and the first to advance past the second round. In doubles, Mirza won 43 titles and spent 91 weeks as world No. 1. In 2005, Mirza was crowned the Newcomer of the Year by the WTA, and in 2015 she and Martina Hingis were the Doubles Team of the Year, going on to earn a 44-match winning streak, one of the longest in history. Mirza has also won a total of 14 medals (including six golds) at three major multi-sport events, namely the Asian Games, the Commonwealth Games and the Afro-Asian Games.

Mirza was named one of the "50 Heroes of Asia" by Time in October 2005. In March 2010, The Economic Times named Mirza in its list of the "33 women who made India proud". She was appointed as the UN Women's Goodwill Ambassador for South Asia during the International Day for the Elimination of Violence against Women on 25 November 2013. She was named in Time magazine's 2016 list of the 100 most influential people in the world.

== Early life ==
Sania Mirza was born on 15 November 1986 in Mumbai to Hyderabadi Muslim parents Imran Mirza, a sports journalist, and his wife Naseema, who worked in a printing business. Shortly after her birth, her family moved to Hyderabad where she and younger sister Anam were raised in a Sunni Muslim family. Anam is married to cricketer Mohammad Asaduddin, the son of former India national cricket team captain, Mohammad Azharuddin. She is the distant relative of former cricket captains Ghulam Ahmed of India, and Asif Iqbal of Pakistan. She took up tennis at the age of six. She has been coached by her father and also Roger Anderson.

She attended Nasr School in Hyderabad. She later graduated from the St. Mary's College, Hyderabad. Mirza also received an honorary degree of Doctor of Letters from the Dr. M.G.R. Educational and Research Institute in Chennai on 11 December 2008.

== Tennis career ==
=== 2001–2003: Success on the ITF Junior Circuit ===
Mirza began playing tennis at the age of six, turning professional in 2003. She was trained by her father. Mirza won ten singles and thirteen doubles titles as a junior player. She won the 2003 Wimbledon Championships girls' doubles title, partnering Alisa Kleybanova. She also reached the semifinals of the 2003 US Open girls' doubles, with Sanaa Bhambri, and the quarterfinals of the 2002 US Open girls' doubles. On the senior circuit, Mirza started to show early success as she made her debut in April 2001 on the ITF Circuit as a 15-year-old. Her highlights of 2001 include a quarterfinal showing in Pune and a semifinal finish in New Delhi. As the 2002 season began, she turned around a season of early losses to winning three straight titles; her first in her hometown Hyderabad and the other two in Manila, in the Philippines. Mirza clinched the women's singles gold medal in tennis at the 2002 National Games of India in Hyderabad at the age of 16.

In February 2003, Mirza was given a wildcard to play in her first ever WTA Tour event, at the Hyderabad Open, in her hometown. She lost the tough first round encounter to Australia's Evie Dominikovic in three sets. The following week, at the Qatar Ladies Open, she fell to Czech Olga Blahotová in the first qualifying round. She had a good result representing India on the Fed Cup, winning three straight matches. She helped India win a bronze medal in the mixed doubles event of the 2002 Asian Games in Busan, partnering Leander Paes. In addition, Mirza picked up four gold medals at the 2003 Afro-Asian Games in Hyderabad.

=== 2004–2005: Success in WTA Tour and Grand Slam tournaments ===
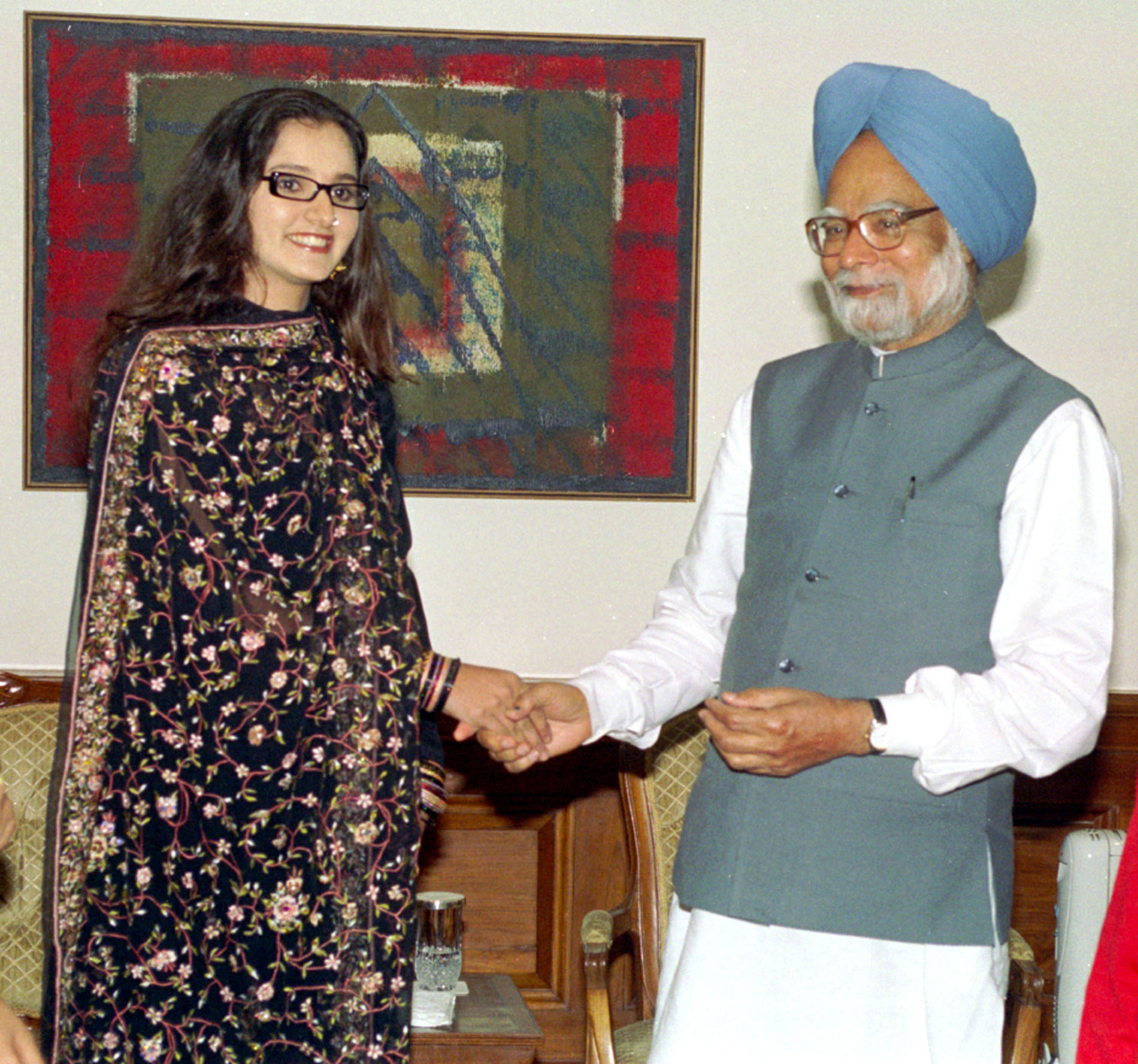
Sania Mirza calls on the Prime Minister, Manmohan Singh in New Delhi on 18 February 2005

At her hometown event, the Hyderabad Open, Mirza was a wildcard entrant. She put up a good fight against the fourth seed and eventual champion, Nicole Pratt, in round one, but lost in three sets. She won her first WTA doubles title at the same event, partnering Liezel Huber. She then received a wildcard to compete at Casablanca, Morocco, but suffered a first-round defeat by eventual champion Émilie Loit.

On the ITF Circuit, Mirza ended runner-up at the Palm Beach Gardens Challenger where she fell to Sesil Karatantcheva. Mirza won six ITF singles titles in 2004. Going into the 2005 Australian Open, she defeated Cindy Watson and Petra Mandula in the first and second rounds, respectively, to reach the third round where she was beaten in straight sets by eventual champion Serena Williams. In February, Mirza became the first-ever Indian woman to win a WTA Tour title, by winning her hometown event, the Hyderabad Open, defeating ninth-seeded Alona Bondarenko in the final. At Dubai, she upset in round two fourth seed and reigning US Open champion, Svetlana Kuznetsova, to reach the biggest quarterfinal of her career. In the second round of the Wimbledon Championships, she lost to Kuznetsova in a tight three-setter.

In August, she reached the third round at the Stanford Classic, falling to Morigami. Mirza reached her second WTA final at the Forest Hills Tennis Classic, falling to Lucie Šafářová. Mirza became the first Indian woman to reach the fourth round of a Grand Slam tournament at the US Open, defeating Mashona Washington, Maria Elena Camerin and Marion Bartoli, before losing to top seed Maria Sharapova, in the round of 16. At the Japan Open, Mirza reached semifinals with wins over Vilmarie Castellvi, Aiko Nakamura and Vera Zvonareva, before being overpowered by Tatiana Golovin. Thanks to a successful 2005 season, Mirza was named the WTA Newcomer of the Year.

=== 2006–2007: Top 30 singles breakthrough ===
Mirza was seeded at the 2006 Australian Open (the first female Indian to be seeded in a Grand Slam event), only falling to Michaëlla Krajicek. Next she fell to Camille Pin at the Bangalore Open, but won the doubles title partnering Huber. She played at the Dubai Tennis Championships but lost to Martina Hingis. At the Indian Wells Open, she reached the third round but lost to Elena Dementieva. She also lost in the first round of the French Open Grand Slam to Anastasia Myskina.

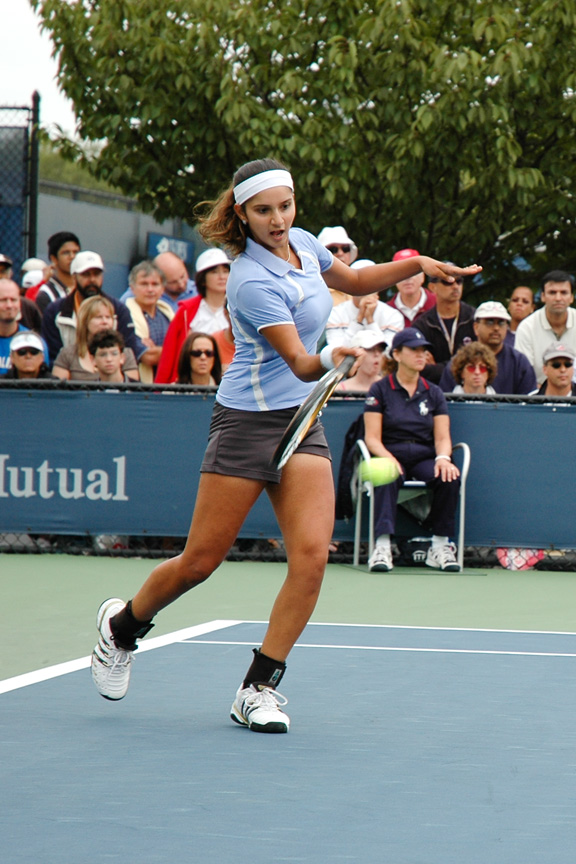
Sania Mirza at the 2006 US Open

Her next tournament was the Birmingham Classic where she defeated Alona Bondarenko and Shenay Perry to reach the third round, where she was overpowered by Meilen Tu. She also reached the quarterfinals of the Cincinnati Open and the third round of the Stanford Classic, falling to Patty Schnyder and Elena Dementieva, respectively. She reached the second round of the US Open, losing to Francesca Schiavone. In September, she reached the semifinals of the San Diego Open, losing to eventual champion and top seed Martina Hingis. She also won the doubles title there partnering Huber. Mirza made the quarterfinals of the Korea Open (defeating top seed Hingis en route) and the Tashkent Open. In December, Mirza picked up three medals at the Doha Asian Games—gold, in mixed doubles and silver in women's singles and team.

In 2006, Mirza notched up three top-ten wins against Svetlana Kuznetsova, Nadia Petrova and Martina Hingis.

Mirza started 2007 in strong fashion, making it to the semifinals of Hobart, the second round of the Australian Open, semifinals in Pattaya, and the quarterfinals in Bangalore. At the French Open, Mirza lost the battle against Ana Ivanovic in the second round. She also fell in the second round at the Wimbledon Championships to Nadia Petrova. Mirza had the best results of her career during the 2007 summer hardcourt season, finishing eighth in the 2007 US Open Series standings and reaching her highest singles ranking of world No. 27.

She reached the quarterfinals in San Diego, the semifinals at Cincinnati, and made it to the final at Stanford. She also won the doubles event in Cincinnati with Shahar Pe'er. At the US Open, she reached the third round before losing to Anna Chakvetadze for the third time in recent weeks. She fared much better in the doubles competition, reaching the quarterfinals in mixed doubles with her partner Mahesh Bhupathi and the quarterfinals in the women's doubles with Bethanie Mattek, including a win over number two seeds Lisa Raymond and Samantha Stosur. She won four doubles titles in 2007.

=== 2008–2009: Grand Slam mixed-doubles championship ===
Mirza reached the quarterfinals at Hobart as the No. 6 seed and lost to Flavia Pennetta in three sets. She reached the third round at the Australian Open as No. 31 seed, in which she lost to No. 8 seed Venus Williams having been up a break in the first set. She ended runner-up in the Australian Open mixed doubles partnering Mahesh Bhupathi, where they lost in straight sets to Sun Tiantian and Nenad Zimonjić.

She had to withdraw from the Pattaya Open because of a left abductor strain. She reached round four at Indian Wells as the No. 21 seed, defeating ninth seed Shahar Pe'er en route, but lost to No. 5 seed Daniela Hantuchová. On grass, Mirza was crushed in the second round of Birmingham by Marina Erakovic. At the 2008 Wimbledon Championships, as the No. 32 seed, Mirza was defeated by qualifier María José Martínez Sánchez in round two, having had several match points.

Mirza represented India at the Beijing Summer Olympics but was eliminated from singles when she retired during her match against Iveta Benešová because of a right wrist injury. For doubles, she got a walkover through the first round with Sunitha Rao, but lost in the second to the Russian duo. Throughout 2008, Mirza was plagued by a slew of wrist injuries, requiring her to withdraw from several matches including those of the French Open and US Open.

Mirza started her year by playing at the doubles event of the Hobart International. Partnering Francesca Schiavone, they reached the quarterfinals. At 2009 Australian Open, she won her first-round match against Marta Domachowska, but she fell against tenth seed Nadia Petrova in round two. In doubles she lost in the first round partnering Vania King. But in mixed doubles, Mirza picked up her first Australian Open Grand Slam title. Partnering with Mahesh Bhupathi, she beat Nathalie Dechy and Andy Ram in the final.

She then entered the Pattaya Open and reached the final after a string of good performances but lost to Vera Zvonareva. She made the semifinals in doubles in the same tournament. Mirza then competed in Indian Wells where she lost in the second round to Flavia Pennetta. She then lost to Mathilde Johansson in the first round of the Miami Open. However, Mirza and her doubles partner Chuang Chia-jung made the semifinals of the women's doubles. Mirza also lost in the first round of the MPS Group Championships but won the doubles title with Chuang. She again lost in the first round at Roland Garros, to Galina Voskoboeva. On grass, Mirza participated at the Birmingham Classic and reached the semifinals, losing to Magdaléna Rybáriková. At Wimbledon, Mirza defeated Anna-Lena Grönefeld in the first round, before falling to No. 28 seed Sorana Cîrstea in the second. She also lost in the second round of the doubles (with Chuang) and mixed doubles (with Bhupathi).

Next, Mirza went to Lexington to compete in the Tennis Championships, and won the title after a few good wins. Her next two tournaments were in Canada, where she had mixed results. She managed it all the way to the final at the Vancouver Open but was beaten by Stéphanie Dubois. At the Rogers Cup, she fell to Heidi El Tabakh in the second qualifying round.

Playing in the US Open, she defeated Olga Govortsova in the first round, but was double-bageled by tenth seed Flavia Pennetta in the second. She also lost in the second round of the doubles event (partnering Francesca Schiavone) to Shahar Pe'er and Gisela Dulko. Mirza then went to Japan, where she qualified for the Pan Pacific Open in Tokyo but lost in the first round to Zheng Jie. At Osaka, Mirza won against fifth seed Shahar Pe'er and Viktoriya Kutuzova and in the quarterfinal, she defeated second seed Marion Bartoli by retirement. Mirza moved on to the semifinal, where she lost to Francesca Schiavone.

=== 2010–2012: Injury, struggles & doubles specialization ===
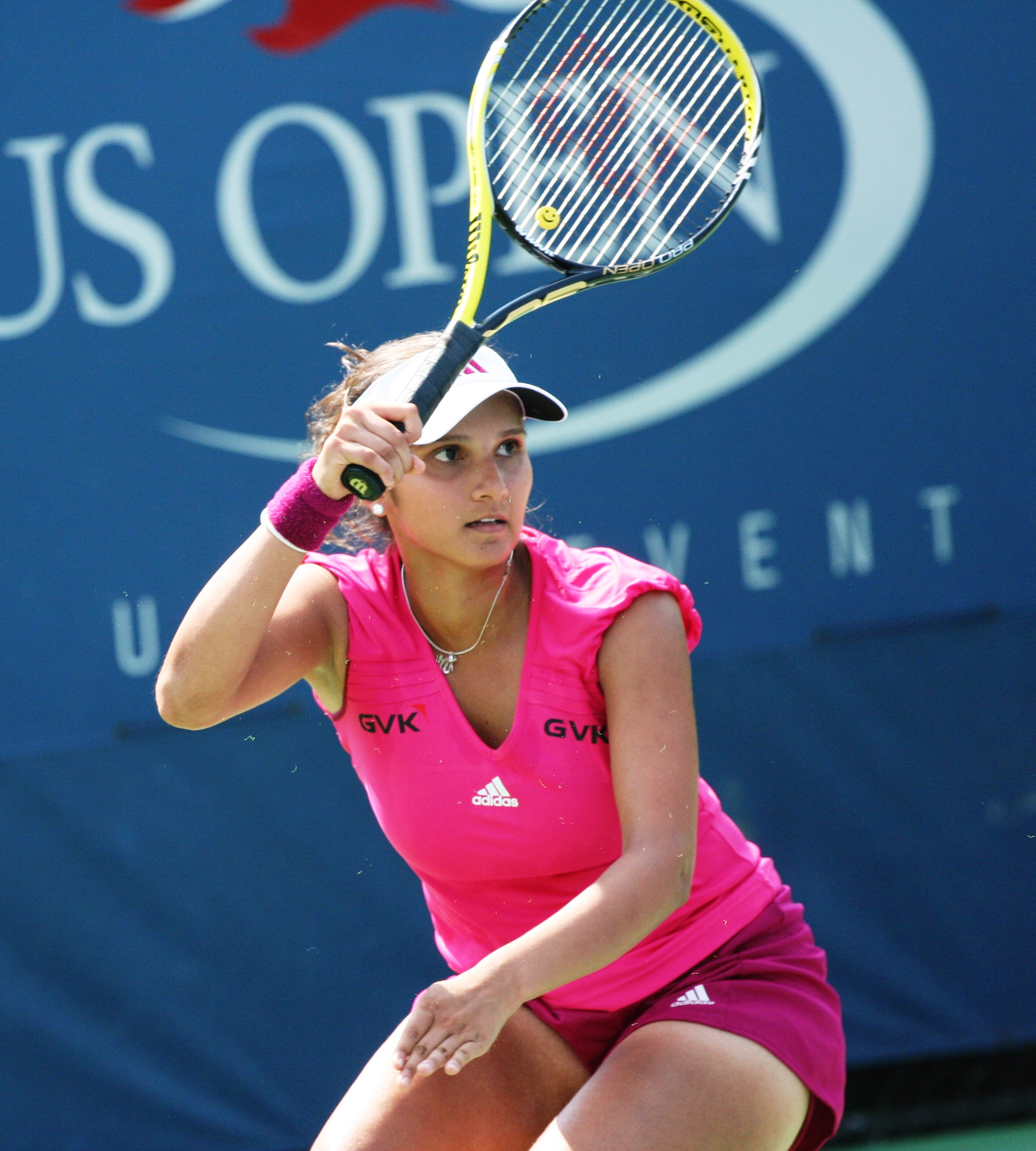
Sania Mirza at the 2010 US Open

Mirza began her year at the Auckland Open where she won her first-round match against Stefanie Vögele, but was crushed by fourth seed Francesca Schiavone in the second round. Mirza then suffered two first-round losses at the Hobart International and the Australian Open. In February, she competed in the Pattaya Open as the sixth seed, but was upset by Tatjana Malek. She then played in Dubai but suffered a first-round defeat to Anabel Medina Garrigues. Mirza was forced to withdraw from the Miami Open, the Indian Wells Open and the Family Circle Cup due to a right wrist injury. This injury also caused her to pull out of the French Open.

She returned at the Birmingham Classic, where she lost in the second round to Tamarine Tanasugarn in three sets. Mirza then fell in the qualifying at Eastbourne and also lost in the first round of Wimbledon; however, she did manage to finish runner-up at the GB Pro-Series Wrexham. Her bad form continued, as she lost in the second round of the Vancouver Open and qualifying rounds of both the Cincinnati Open and the Rogers Cup. Mirza won her first round match against Michelle Larcher de Brito at the US Open, but she went down against 20th seeded Anastasia Pavlyuchenkova in the second round.

In September, Mirza competed in the Guangzhou International Open where she made her first quarterfinal of the season. She then lost in the first round of the Tashkent Open, in the qualifying draw of the Luxembourg Open, and the first round of the Taipei Ladies Open. In doubles, Mirza won in Guangzhou (with Edina Gallovits) and finished as a runner-up in Taipei (with Hsieh Su-wei). In October, she represented India at the 2010 Commonwealth Games as the second seed. She defeated Brittany Teei (Cook Islands), Marina Erakovic (New Zealand), and Olivia Rogowska (Australia) before losing to Australian Anastasia Rodionova in the final. In doubles, she partnered with fellow Indian, Rushmi Chakravarthi, losing in the semifinals to Anastasia Rodionova and Sally Peers (Australia). Mirza and Chakravarthi beat compatriots Poojashree Venkatesha and Nirupama Sanjeev to win the bronze medal.

In November, she represented India at the 2010 Asian Games. The unseeded Indian defeated Venise Chan in the first round. Next, she defeated sixth seed Zhang Shuai in straight sets to enter into quarterfinal. In the quarterfinal, Mirza won against second seed Tamarine Tanasugarn to move in semifinal, where she was defeated by third seed Akgul Amanmuradova and won bronze medal in singles. In mixed doubles, she partnered with India's Vishnu Vardhan losing in the finals to Chan Yung-jan and Yang Tsung-hua and won silver medal. In December, she went to Dubai to compete at the Al Habtoor Challenge. Coming unseeded, she won the tournament, defeating Ksenia Pervak, top seed Julia Görges and Evgeniya Rodina en route, and second seed Bojana Jovanovski in the final.

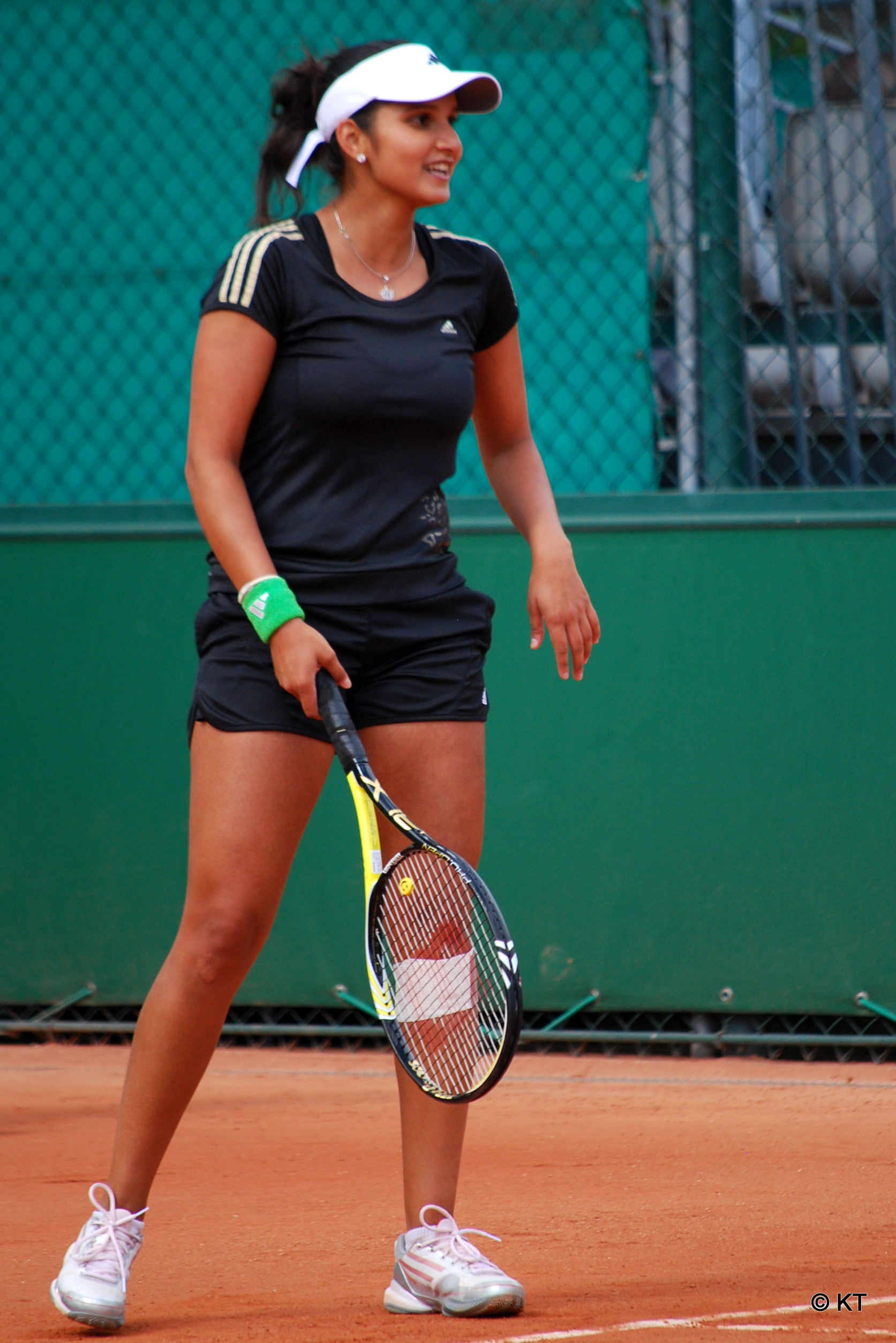
Mirza at the 2011 French Open, where she reached the finals in doubles alongside Vesnina

Mirza lost in the early rounds of the Australian Open and its warm-up tournaments. Following that, she received wildcards to play in the Dubai Open and the Qatar Open. She made the second rounds of both events, falling to Ayumi Morita and Jelena Janković, respectively. She also was the quarterfinalist in doubles at both, with Elena Vesnina. At the Premier Mandatory events in March, Mirza made the second rounds in both. In doubles, she won her first Premier Mandatory title at Indian Wells, with Vesnina, defeating Bethanie Mattek-Sands and Meghann Shaughnessy.

Mirza participated at the Premier-level Charleston Open in South Carolina. In singles, she made her first Premier quarterfinal since San Diego in August 2007. In doubles, Mirza won the title with Vesnina: the Indo-Russian duo beat Mattek-Sands and Shaughnessy in the final for the second time this season. Mirza won her 11th WTA Tour doubles title and second of the year.

Next, she also competed at the Madrid Open, losing in the first round against doubles partner Elena Vesnina. In doubles, with Vesnina, she managed to go up to the third round. Mirza took part in the Sparta Prague Open, but had to retire in her first round match against Aleksandra Krunić due to a back injury. Next she played at Strasbourg, but suffered a first round lost Alizé Cornet.

Mirza breezed through the first round of the French Open where she beat Kristina Barrois in straight sets. Then in round two, she lost to 12th seed Agnieszka Radwańska. In doubles, Mirza had what was probably the greatest highlight of her career- reaching the finals of a Grand Slam and she ended up runner-up with Vesnina losing out to Andrea Hlaváčková and Lucie Hradecká.

During the grass-court season Mirza lost in the first rounds of the singles and doubles competition at Eastbourne. Playing at the All England Lawn Tennis Club, she came up with her personal best performance by reaching her first semifinals at Wimbledon alongside Vesnina losing out to Květa Peschke and Katarina Srebotnik. En route they beat 13th seeds Daniela Hantuchová and Agnieszka Radwańska in the round of 16 and the Spanish duo of Nuria Llagostera Vives and Arantxa Parra Santonja in the quarterfinal clash. In singles, she lost in the first round to Virginie Razzano in a close three-setter.

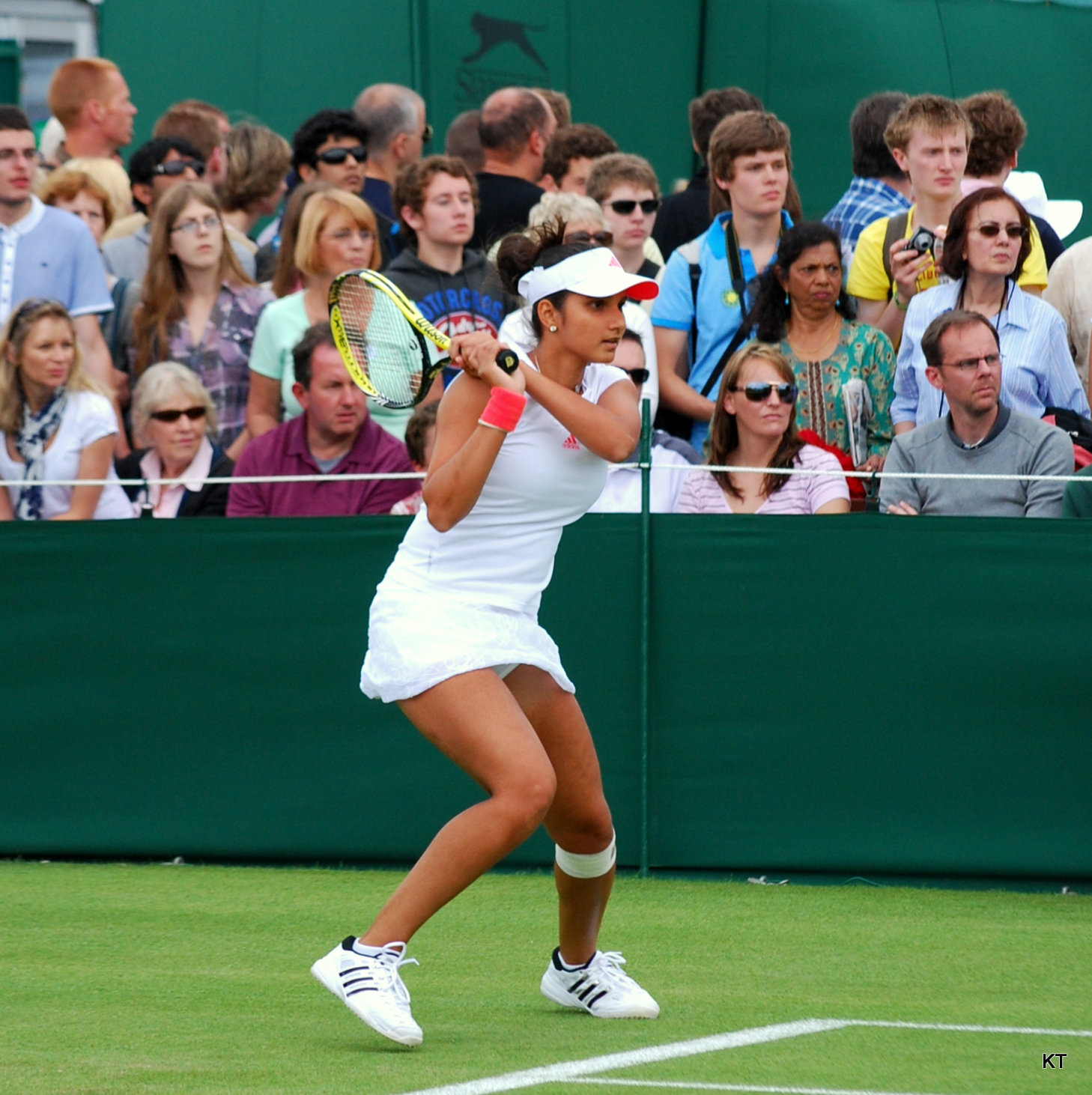
Mirza during her match with Virginie Razzano at Wimbledon, 2011

She then could not cross the first round hurdles in her next five attempts in singles including the US Open where she lost yet another tight three setter to 23rd seed Shahar Pe'er. On two occasions Mirza scored two wins in qualifying rounds, defeated Heidi El Tabakh at Rogers Cup and Vania King at Cincinnati. She, however, continued her good run in doubles competition as she won the title at D.C. partnering Yaroslava Shvedova, defeating the second seeded Olga Govortsova and Alla Kudryavtseva in the final.

Partnering Vesnina, Mirza entered the Southern California Open but the duo had to withdraw from their first-round match against Elena Bovina and Zheng Jie while leading 5–2 in the first set. Playing at Rogers Cup, the pair lost to the future world No. 1, Italian duo of Sara Errani and Roberta Vinci, in three sets. At Flushing Meadows, Mirza and Vesnina lost in the pre-quarterfinals to the Czech duo of Iveta Melzer and Barbora Záhlavová-Strýcová, having beaten Samantha Crawford and Madison Keys, Vitalia Diatchenko and Olga Savchuk, in straight sets in their previous encounters. After playing on the singles circuit regularly throughout the year, Mirza also re-entered top 60 in singles ranking in 2011.

Mirza kicked off her 2012 season ranked 104th in Auckland. She lost a first qualifying match against CoCo Vandeweghe. As for doubles, she partnered Elena Vesnina and made it to the semifinals, losing to Julia Görges and Flavia Pennetta. Her next tournament was in Sydney where she played doubles only alongside Roberta Vinci, but lost in round one.

Going into the Australian Open, Mirza was overpowered by Tsvetana Pironkova in the first round. In doubles, she reached her third Grand Slam semifinal, partnering Vesnina, where they fell to Svetlana Kuznetsova and Vera Zvonareva. For the mixed-doubles event, Mirza played alongside compatriot Mahesh Bhupathi and reached her fourth Grand Slam semifinal.

Mirza then represented India at the Fed Cup in Shenzhen, China where they were facing Hong Kong. In singles, she defeated Zhang Ling. Partnering with Isha Lakhani, the pair beat Chan Wing-yau and Zhang in three sets. With this performance, India advanced to the Fed Cup Asia/Oceania Zone Group I for 2013. Mirza then played at the Pattaya Open where she won her first WTA main draw match since the 2011 French Open – coming from a set down to upset Ayumi Morita (ranked 47 spots higher). In second round she beat Anne Keothavong to enter in quarterfinal, where she lost to Hsieh Su-wei. In doubles with Anastasia Rodionova, she won her 13th WTA title: they defeated the Taiwanese sisters Chan Hao-ching and Chan Yung-jan.

Mirza then went to Doha to play at the Qatar Ladies Open but had to withdraw from the singles qualifying event, due to playing Pattaya doubles final. She lost in the second round of doubles with Elena Vesnina. Then, in Dubai, she was beaten by Aleksandra Wozniak in the first qualifying round. In doubles, Mirza and Vesnina were runners-up against top seeds Liezel Huber and Lisa Raymond. Mirza then lost a tough three set encounter to Eleni Daniilidou in round one of the Malaysian Open.

Playing doubles at the Premier-line up of Indian Wells, Miami and Charleston, Mirza reached the final, lost in round one and made the quarterfinals, respectively. She also reached round two of singles in Indian Wells. She then would begin the European Clay Court Season at Estoril, where she was the semifinalist in doubles (with Anastasia Rodionova). She lost in round two of doubles in Madrid and also in Rome. Mirza returned on the singles circuit in May at Brussels where she won three good matches – including her first 'double bagel' – in the qualifying competition, where she beat Lesia Tsurenko, who was ranked 87 spots higher than her. She also won the doubles of the same event with Bethanie Mattek-Sands.

She then participated in the French Open in the women's doubles (with Mattek-Sands) and the French Open mixed doubles (with Bhupathi). In the doubles she suffered a first-round shock defeat but found great success in the French Open mixed-doubles where she and Bhupathi won the crown by defeating Santiago González of Mexico and Klaudia Jans-Ignacik of Poland in the final on 7 June 2012.

At Eastbourne, Mirza would play the last singles tournament of her career. She defeated Lisa Whybourn in the qualifying round one, before losing to Andrea Hlaváčková in the next round. Mirza and her partner Shvedova crashed out of the Birmingham Classic with a straight-set defeat by Iveta Benešová and Alla Kudryavtseva. Mirza then would go on to falling in the qualifying singles and first-round doubles at Eastbourne.

Mirza and her American partner Mattek-Sands advanced to the third round of the women's doubles competition at Wimbledon, where they fell to the Williams sisters. On 26 June 2012, Mirza was awarded a wildcard entry hence confirming her participation in women's doubles event of the London Olympics. On 17 July 2012, Mirza and her partner Mattek-Sands were ousted in the first round of WTA Premier event in the US.

Mirza, partnering Rushmi Chakravarthy in the women's doubles competition at Olympics, bowed out, losing to Chinese Taipei team in a tight match. She also lost in quarterfinals of mixed doubles with Leander Paes to Belarus in a tough encounter. At the Premier Mandatory events of Montréal and Cincinnati, partnering Mattek-Sands, Mirza reached the quarterfinals and lost in round one of doubles, respectively.

In October 2012 the prize purse for female winners of the "Fenesta Open National Tennis Championship" was increased to be equal to that of male winners at Mirza's suggestion to All India Tennis Association president Anil Khanna. Khanna also announced that "From now on we will see to it that all national tournaments have the same prize money for both categories women and men."

=== 2013–2014: Top 5 doubles breakthrough ===
Mirza kicked off her 2013 season with a title Brisbane alongside Bethanie Mattek-Sands in the first tournament itself. The pair then unexpectedly lost in the first round of Australian Open, Mirza though reached the quarterfinals of the 2013 Australian Open mixed doubles partnering Bob Bryan. Mattek-Sands and Mirza then won the doubles title at the Dubai Tennis Championships in February. They had to retire in their round of 16 match at the French Open after having won the first set against Anastasia Pavlyuchenkova and Lucie Šafářová. They also lost in the round of 16 at Wimbledon. Mirza then formed a brief successful partnership with Zheng Jie from China winning a title at New Haven and reaching the semis at US Open losing out to Australians Casey Dellacqua and Ashleigh Barty. Mirza then partnered Cara Black for the rest of the season and the pair won their first title in their first outing at Tokyo. They won their second title in a row as they lifted the China Open trophy defeating top seeds and world-number-ones, Sara Errani and Roberta Vinci, en route. Mirza partnered different players during 2013 and won five WTA titles.

Mirza began 2014 playing with Cara Black in the Sydney International where they lost in the first round to Ajla Tomljanović and Jarmila Gajdošová. Her next tournament was the Australian Open. Seeded sixth, Mirza and Black reached the quarterfinals at the 2014 Australian Open – Women's doubles before losing to top seeds and eventual champions Errani and Vinci. She was more successful in the mixed doubles event, reaching the final partnering Horia Tecău of Romania. Tecău and Mirza lost to Kristina Mladenovic and Daniel Nestor in the final.

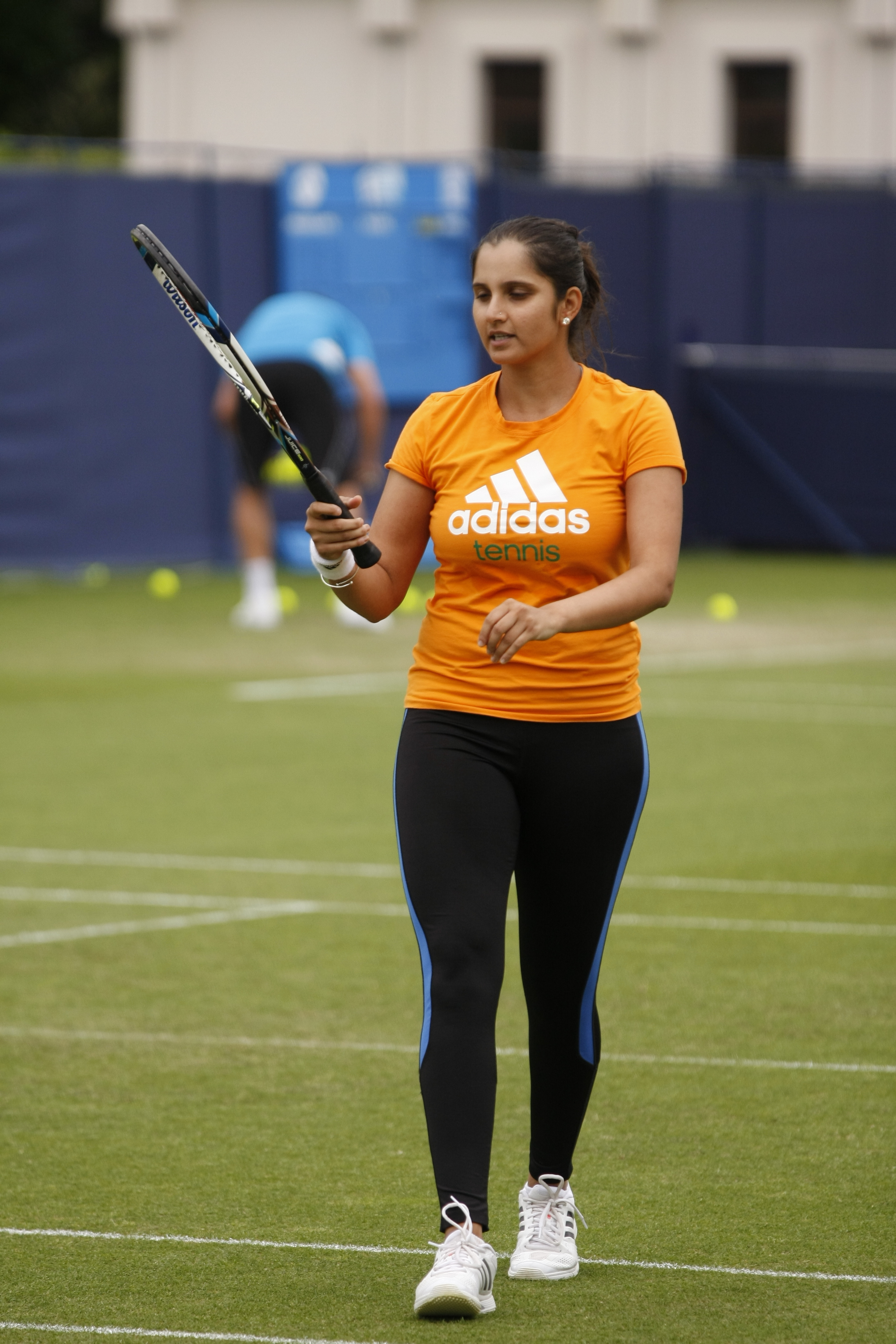
Mirza practicing at the 2014 Eastbourne International

Mirza and Black next competed in the Qatar Open and lost to the pairing of Anastasia Pavlyuchenkova and Nadia Petrova in the quarterfinals. The pair lost in the first round of the Dubai Championships to Andrea Hlaváčková and Lucie Šafářová. They reached their first WTA Tour doubles final of the year at the Indian Wells Open but lost to Hsieh Su-wei and Peng Shuai. Mirza and Black reached the semifinals of the Miami Open, before losing to wildcards Martina Hingis and Sabine Lisicki. They finished runners-up to Errani and Vinci once again in the Porsche Tennis Grand Prix. They won their first title of the year at the 2014 Portugal Open, defeating Eva Hrdinová and Valeria Solovyeva in the final.

Mirza and Black recorded three consecutive quarterfinal finishes in the subsequent clay tournaments, namely the Madrid Open, the Italian Open, and the French Open. In the mixed doubles event at the 2014 French Open, Mirza and Horia Tecău lost in the second round to Tímea Babos and Eric Butorac. Mirza began grass-court season playing in Birmingham. She and Black lost to Raquel Kops-Jones and Abigail Spears in the semifinals. At Eastbourne, they reached the quarterfinals before losing to Chan Hao-ching and Chan Yung-jan. The pair next competed at Wimbledon and lost in the second round to the unseeded pairing of Anastasia Pavlyuchenkova and Lucie Šafářová.

Mirza and Black next competed in the 2014 US Open and lost to the pairing of Martina Hingis and Flavia Pennetta in the semifinals. Mirza played the mixed doubles in the US Open pairing with Bruno Soares and went on to become the 2014 US Open mixed-doubles champions, thereby winning the third mixed doubles title in her career.

Sania won a gold and bronze at the 17th Asian Games in Incheon, South Korea. She paired with Saketh Myneni to beat China's Hsien Yin Peng and Chan Hao-ching and win gold in the mixed doubles tournament. She also won a bronze medal in women's doubles, pairing with Prarthana Thombare.

Black and Mirza won their biggest title together at the WTA Finals defeating Hsieh Su-wei and Peng Shuai in the final. It was the heaviest defeat ever witnessed in the end-of-season competition's doubles final which dates back 41 years to 1973, the year the WTA was founded. Black and Mirza survived matchpoints in both their previous encounters against Květa Peschke/Katarina Srebotnik and Raquel Kops-Jones/Abigail Spears coming through in third set tiebreaks. This final would be the duo's final match as a team.

"It was great – we saved the best for the last. I think today was our best match. One of our best matches at least, and one of our best matches we played against them." Mirza told reporters after the win. "To end this way, we couldn't have asked for a better start or end. It kind of sums up our partnership", she added. She added that Black was her great friend "But I've also found a great friend in her. Almost like an older sister to me. I'm the oldest in my family, so I learned a lot from her on and off the court."

Mirza participated in the International Premier Tennis League starting on 28 November 2014, playing with the Micromax Indian Aces alongside tennis legend Roger Federer, countryman Rohan Bopanna, Ana Ivanovic and Gaël Monfils. She played all the mixed-doubles matches alongside Bopanna and partnered Federer who visited the country for his first match there in the New Delhi leg, much to her personal and fans' delight. Mirza won the majority of her matches and played a key role for the Indian Aces to win the inaugural edition of the IPTL 2014.

=== 2015–2016: Rise to world No. 1 and women's doubles major titles ===
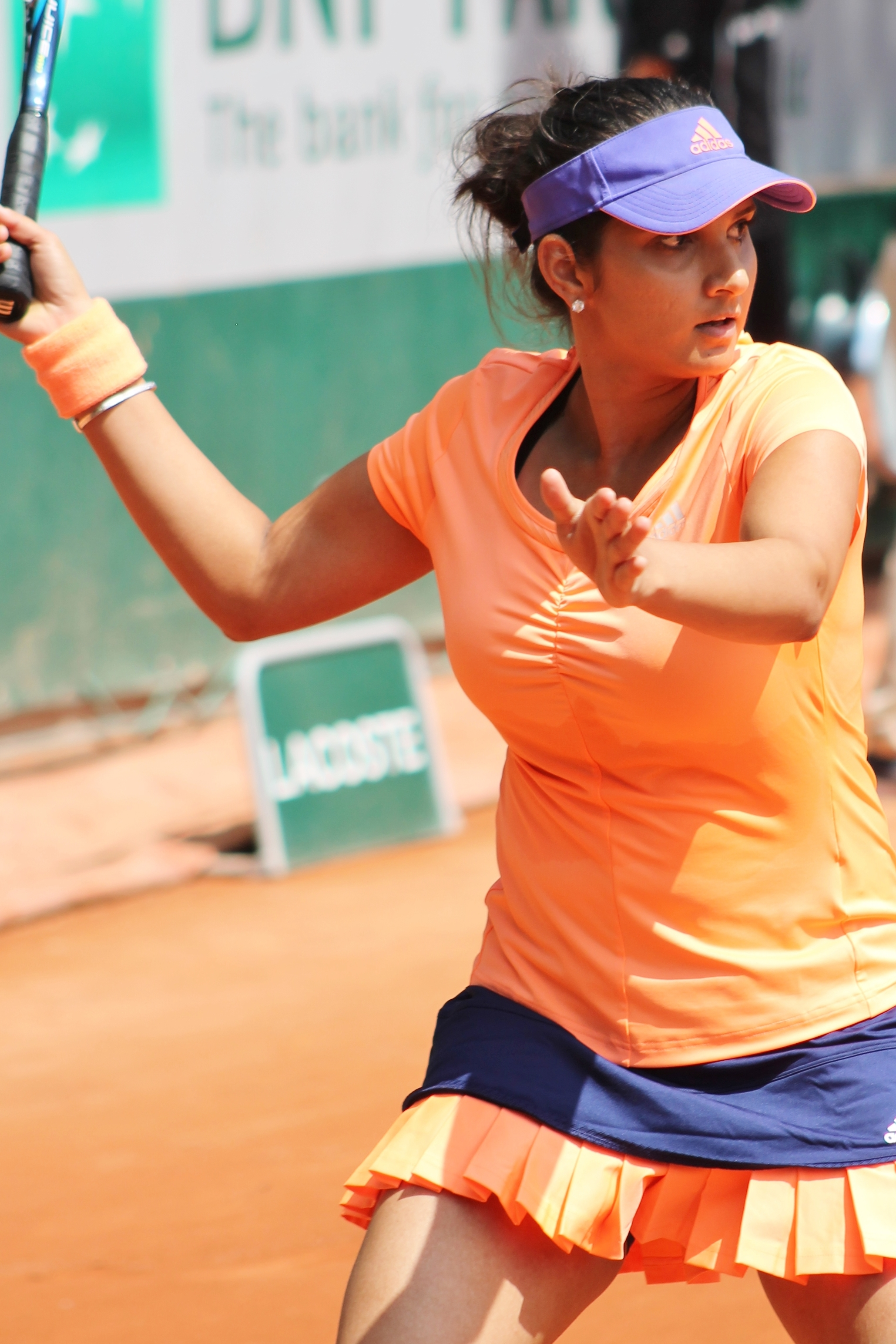
Mirza attained the No. 1 ranking in April and was top seeded at the 2015 French Open with Martina Hingis

Mirza began her 2015 season ranked No. 6 in the doubles rankings. She started a new partnership with then world No. 5, Hsieh Su-wei from Chinese Taipei, after Cara Black decided to go for a limited 2015 season. The pair started their season at the 2015 Brisbane International as the top seeds and reached the semifinals losing out to fourth seeds Caroline Garcia and Katarina Srebotnik in the super tie-breaker after having won the first set.

Mirza paired up with former partner and good friend Bethanie Mattek-Sands for the Sydney International and went on to win the tournament for her 23rd career title (fifth with Mattek-Sands) beating the highly fancied second seeds Martina Hingis and Flavia Pennetta in the quarterfinals and top-seeds Raquel Kops-Jones and Abigail Spears in the finals, but lost in the second round at Melbourne. She also re-entered the top 5 in the rankings. Mirza also reached the finals of Qatar Ladies Open at Doha alongside Hsieh. The pair lost to Americans Raquel Kops-Jones and Abigail Spears.

Mirza then ended her partnership with Hsieh and paired up with Swiss legend Martina Hingis. The pair entered Indian Wells as the top seeds and went on to win the titles in their debut. They beat opponents including former world-number-ones Lisa Raymond and Sam Stosur. Hingis and Mirza didn't lose more than four games in any set. After cruising through the first set of the final, they fell behind in the second set but won the next four games to beat second seeds Ekaterina Makarova and Elena Vesnina in straight sets. They also won the Miami masters event, again beating the same opponents. Mirza jumped two places on the ranking table to be ranked at her career best No. 3 in the doubles rankings.

The duo then entered the Miami Open and went to beat the same opponents in the finals making it their second title in as many tournaments. The pair did not lose a single set at the tournament, making the set score 20–0 for their newly formed partnership. Before reaching the finals at Miami the pair beat Elena Bogdan and Nicole Melichar, Gabriela Dabrowski and Alicja Rosolska, Anastasia Rodionova and Arina Rodionova, and seventh seeds Tímea Babos and Kristina Mladenovic. They overcame Vesnina and Makarova in the finals in straight sets.

Mirza and Hingis won Family Circle Cup's double title in April 2015 defeating Casey Dellacqua and Darija Jurak and with the title win Mirza became the first Indian to be ranked world No. 1 in WTA's doubles rankings. It was Mirza and Hingis' third successive title win and they have not lost as a single match since joining forces, winning 14 matches in a row. "It's a dream for every kid to be No. 1 one day." Mirza said after her win. And on reaching No. 1 in Charleston she added "No tournament has been as special to me as the Family Circle Cup and no tournament will ever be as special to me, because I became No. 1 here." They were routed in the first round at the Porsche Tennis Grand Prix. They reached the finals of Italian Open but lost to the team of Tímea Babos and Kristina Mladenovic. They lost in the quarterfinals of French Open to Mattek-Sands and Šafářová where the duo were the top seeds. Mirza was also given the top seeding with her partner Bruno Soares in the mixed doubles event. In spite of this, the pair lost in just 56 minutes against the unseeded Anna-Lena Grönefeld and Jean-Julien Rojer in the first round.

For the grass-court season, Mirza was seeded No. 1 in the Birmingham Premier level event and partnered with Casey Dellacqua. However, the team crashed out of the WTA event following a straight-set defeat in Birmingham on 18 June 2015. They lost to unseeded pair of Zheng Jie and Chan Yung-jan in the opening round. Mirza and Hingis were beaten in the semifinals of the Eastbourne International. The top seeds lost to the fourth seeded French-Slovenian combine of Caroline Garcia and Katarina Srebotnik in 81 minutes.

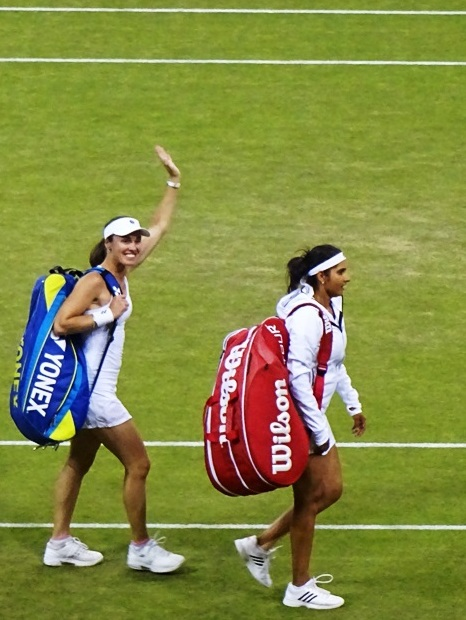
Mirza won her maiden major title with Hingis at the 2015 Wimbledon Championships.

Mirza and Hingis won the Wimbledon Championships, defeating Ekaterina Makarova and Elena Vesnina in three tough sets in the final. After splitting two very close sets against two-time major champions Makarova and Vesnina, Hingis and Mirza – who were playing just their second Grand Slam together – fell behind in the third set were a game away from going out. But a fierce rally saw them draw level at 5-all, and after a half hour break for the Centre Court roof to be closed due to fading light, the No. 1-seeded Swiss-Indian duo came out stronger, breaking the No. 2-seeded Russians one last time and then serving it out for a gritty victory. The win gave Mirza her first Grand Slam title in women's doubles and Hingis her tenth.

En route to the final, the pair did not lose a single set against any of their opponents. In the opening two rounds the duo beat unseeded opponents, Zarina Diyas and Zheng Saisai and veteran Japanese-Italian combine of Kimiko Date-Krumm and Francesca Schiavone. 16th seeded Spaniard duo of Anabel Medina Garrigues and Arantxa Parra Santonja beating them in the third round, ninth seeds Casey Dellacqua and Yaroslava Shvedova in the quarter finals, and dominated fifth seeded Kops-Jones and Spears (who beat them earlier) in the semifinals before finally overcoming Vesnina and Makarova in the marathon final. With the win Mirza and Hingis also regain the top spot in 2015 Road to Singapore standings trading spots with Bethanie Mattek-Sands and Lucie Šafářová and became the first team to qualify for WTA Finals.

The pair reached two consecutive finals at the Rogers Cup and Western & Southern Open losing out to Caroline Garcia, Katarina Srebotnik and Chan Hao-ching, Chan Yung-jan, respectively. At the US Open the pair entered the tournament as the top seed and went on to win the title defeating Casey Dellacqua and Yaroslava Shvedova in the finals. They did not lose a set throughout the fortnight defeating seeded opponents Michaëlla Krajicek, Barbora Strýcová, Chan sisters, Sara Errani, Flavia Pennetta. This was the pair's second straight Grand Slam title after Wimbledon. Their undefeated run continued through the rest of the year with titles at Guangzhou International Women's Open and Premier-level tournament 2015 Wuhan Open, and Premier Mandatory China Open defeating Xu Shilin and You Xiaodi, Irina-Camelia Begu and Monica Niculescu, Chan sisters again, respectively.

The pair then entered 2015 WTA Finals as heavy favourites and the top seeds and lived up to the expectations as they did not lose a single set en route to the title at the Premier Event. This was Mirza's second straight title at the Finals and she remains undefeated at the year ending tournament. The pair of Hingis-Mirza topped their group and beat the Chan's in the semi-finals and Garbiñe Muguruza and Carla Suárez Navarro in the finals to win the title. The pair thus ended the year with a 22 match winning streak and Mirza secured the year ending No. 1 ranking and wrapped up her 2015 season with ten WTA titles including two Grand Slams.

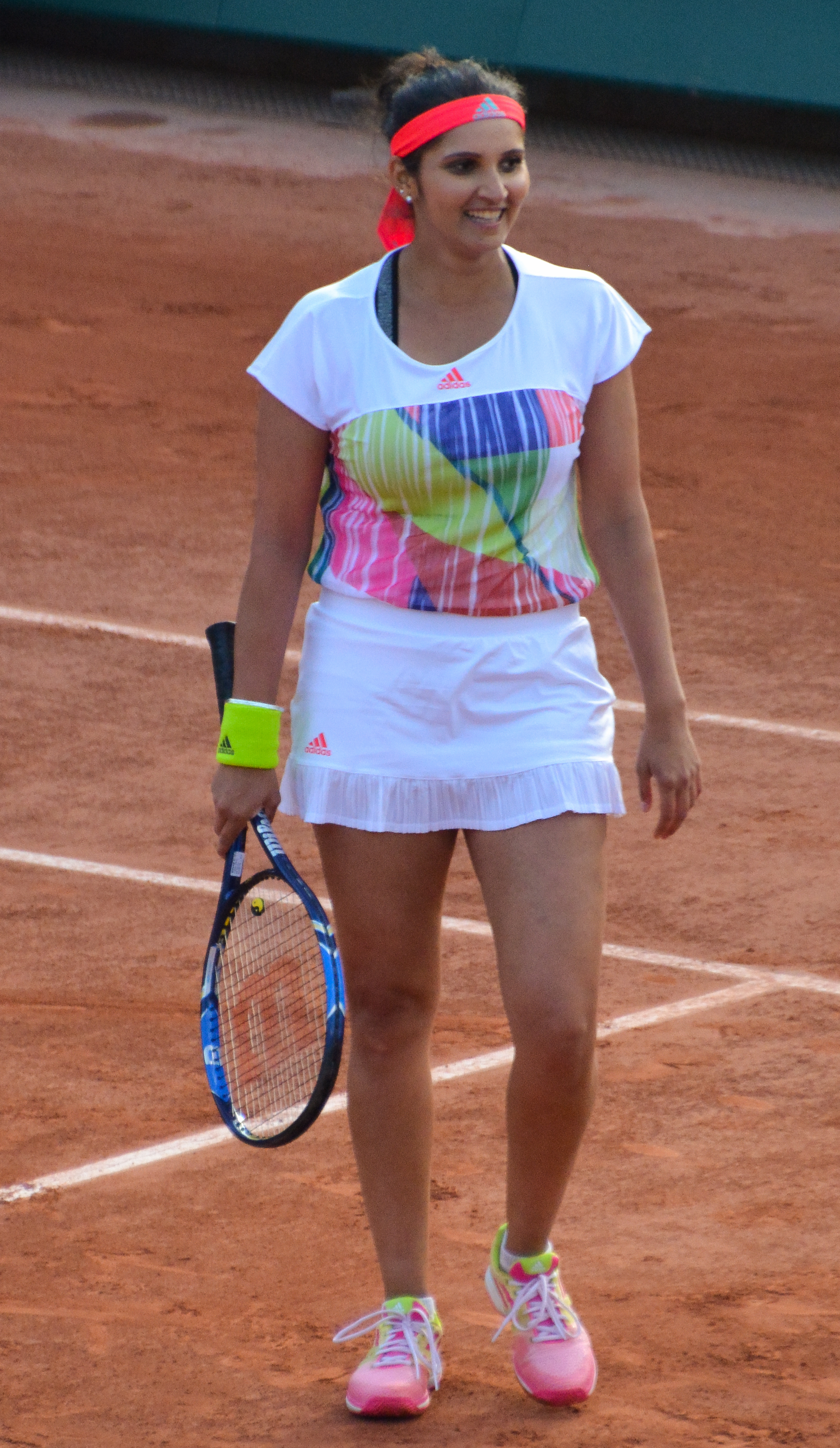
Mirza on clay court at the 2016 French Open

Mirza and Hingis kicked off their 2016 WTA Tour in Australia by winning the tournaments in Brisbane and Sydney. In the Australian Open, they were seeded top and won the doubles title, Mirza's third Grand Slam title.

Mirza and Hingis then proceeded to the inaugural St. Petersburg Trophy and won the title there, defeating Dushevina/Krejčíková in the final. They next played at the Qatar Ladies Open, where they suffered a shock loss to Daria Kasatkina/Elena Vesnina. That loss ended Hingis and Mirza's 41 match winning streak. They then played the Indian Wells Open, where they played their first tournament together, and surprisingly lost their second-round match against Vania King/Alla Kudryavtseva.

At the Miami Open, Mirza and Hingis again lost in the second round to Margarita Gasparyan and Monica Niculescu. After losing three out of last five matches, Mirza and Hingis took a break and did not play in the Charleston Open, where they were the defending champions.

Mirza and Hingis opened their clay season by reaching the finals of Porsche Grand Prix and Madrid Open, where they eventually lost to Kristina Mladenovic and Caroline Garcia in both the tournaments. They, however, managed to reach and win their third consecutive clay-court final in Rome, by defeating Makarova and Vesnina in the deciding tie-breaker.

=== 2017–2018: Split with Hingis, maternity leave ===
In August 2016, Mirza and Hingis announced their mutual decision to split as a team, citing their last few under-par performances, with the 2016 WTA Finals in Singapore being their last event together. Mirza partnered with Barbora Strýcová in late 2016 (winning two titles) and some parts of the 2017 season. In 2017, her sole title came at Brisbane, where she played alongside her friend Mattek-Sands. However, Mirza struggled to find a committed partner to play with in the 2017 season, which resulted in her falling out of the top 5. The last tournament she played was the China Open, where she lost in the semifinals partnering Peng Shuai.

Mirza missed the first few tournaments of the 2018 season, including the Australian Open, citing a knee injury she sustained in October 2017. In early February 2018, Mirza said the same injury would keep her out of competition for a further two months. In April, Mirza announced on Instagram that she was pregnant with her first child, with husband Shoaib Malik. In late October, Mirza had delivered a baby boy.

=== 2020: Winning return ===
In late 2018, Mirza announced she hoped to return to professional tennis in time for the 2020 Summer Olympics. After having celebrated her son's first birthday and having spent more than two years off the professional circuit, she returned to the tour at the Hobart International in January 2020 playing alongside Nadiia Kichenok. The newly formed team won the tournament beating second seeds Peng Shuai/Zhang Shuai in the final. However, the team lost their first round match at the 2020 Australian Open because of a calf injury suffered by Mirza. She played at the 2020 Summer Olympics with Ankita Raina, but lost to Ukrainian pair of Nadiia and Lyudmyla Kichenok in the first round. This was Mirza's third consecutive first round exit in women's doubles event at the Olympics.

=== 2022: French Open third round, three WTA 1000 semifinals, back to top 25 ===
She reached the semifinals at the WTA 1000 Qatar Open and the Italian Open as well as the French Open third round, partnering Lucie Hradecká.

At the Canadian Open, she reached the quarterfinals of a WTA 1000 level partnering Madison Keys where they defeated top seeds Elise Mertens and Veronika Kudermetova. Next, they defeated Sofia Kenin and Yulia Putintseva to reach the semifinals.

=== 2023: Retirement ===
On 7 January, she announced she would retire after her last tournament at the Dubai Championships, in February. Mirza started the season at Adelaide International with Anna Danilina where they lost to top seeds Storm Hunter and Barbora Krejčíková in three sets.

At the Australian Open, she and Danilina entered as the eighth seeds. They defeated Bernarda Pera and Dalma Gálfi in first round in straight sets but they lost in the second to Anhelina Kalinina and Alison Van Uytvanck in three sets. The second-round match became Mirza's last women's doubles match at a major. In the mixed doubles, partnering with Rohan Bopanna, Mirza advanced to the final.

At Dubai, she partnered Madison Keys for the last tournament of her career.

== Playing style ==
Mirza is an offensive baseliner with very powerful groundstroke and is known for setting up good attacks with the sheer velocity of her groundstrokes. Her main strength is her forehand, as well as her volleying skills. Her power game has drawn comparisons to Romanian legend Ilie Năstase. She is also a great returner of serve finding many return winners during matches. Mirza goes for winners, which means she goes for many angles. Mirza has said that "There's no doubt that my forehand and backhand can match anyone, it's about the place that they're put in. I can hit the ball as hard as anyone can". "I'm not that fast on my feet", she added as her most evident weakness is her movement around the court, where Mirza usually struggles moving up and around the court. Mirza's second serve and relatively poor mobility are often quoted as her big weaknesses. But by 2012, a series of injuries had effectively ended her singles career.

== Awards and recognition ==
- Arjuna Award (2004)
- WTA Newcomer of the Year (2005)
- Padma Shri (2006)
- Khel Ratna Award (2015)
- BBC list of 100 inspiring women (2015)
- Padma Bhushan (2016)
- NRI of the Year (2016)
- Pinkvilla Screen and Style Icons Awards - Super Glam Sports Star of the Year (2023)

In the year 2014, the Government of Telangana appointed Mirza as the brand ambassador of the state. Chief Minister of Telangana K. Chandrashekhar Rao congratulated Sania Mirza on her being awarded Khel Ratna Award. She was named inTime's 2016 list of 100 most influential people in the world.

== Personal life ==
In 2009, Mirza got engaged to Sohrab Mirza. However, the engagement was called off shortly after.

On 12 April 2010, she married Pakistani cricketer Shoaib Malik in a traditional Hyderabadi Muslim wedding ceremony at the Taj Krishna Hotel in Hyderabad, Telangana, India; followed by Pakistani Punjabi wedding customs for a mahr of ₹ 6.1 million (US$137,500). Their Walima ceremony was held in Sialkot, Punjab, Pakistan.

The couple announced their first pregnancy on social media on 23 April 2018. In October 2018, Malik announced on Twitter that Mirza had delivered a baby boy and named him Izhaan Mirza Malik.

In January 2024 Mirza's family announced that the couple had divorced some months prior.

== Off the court ==
In 2014, Mirza was the brand ambassador for the Indian state of Telangana to promote the interests of the then newly created state.

Mirza has established a tennis academy in Hyderabad. Former world No. 1s and multiple Grand Slam winners Cara Black and Martina Navratilova have both visited the academy on different occasions.

Mirza was announced the UN Women Goodwill Ambassador for South Asia. She is the first South Asian woman to be appointed as a Goodwill Ambassador in the organization's history.

== Controversies ==
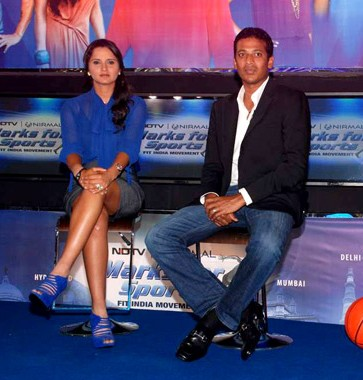
Mirza (here with Bhupathi) accused the All India Tennis Association (AITA) of using her as 'bait' in Paes–Bhupathi 2012 Olympics controversy.

In September 2005, a fatwa against Mirza was issued by a cleric named Haseeb-ul-hasan Siddiqui of the Sunni Ulema Board. The fatwa said that her attire on the tennis court and billboard advertisements were un-Islamic. Mirza later decided to hire bodyguards.

In 2006, some newspapers reported that Mirza declined to play doubles with Israeli tennis player Shahar Pe'er for fear of protests from India's Muslim community.

On 4 February 2008, Mirza said that she would stop appearing in tennis tournaments held in India, starting with the 2008 Bangalore Open the following month, citing the series of controversies and upon advice by her manager. But Mirza chose to participate at the 2010 Commonwealth Games in Delhi.

After both Mahesh Bhupathi and Rohan Bopanna refused to play in the men's doubles event at the 2012 Olympics with Leander Paes, Paes demanded that he be partnered with Mirza for the mixed doubles event. Mirza accused the All India Tennis Association (AITA) of using her as 'bait' to keep Paes happy as she wanted to play with Bhupathi, with whom she has won 2 grand slams. In the end, Mirza was paired with Paes and the pair lost in the quarterfinals of the mixed doubles.

Mirza, along with Sunitha Rao, was photographed violating the dress code at Beijing Olympic Opening Ceremony parade in 2008. In response, Mirza reaffirmed loyalty to the land of her birth—"To see the national flag go up while standing on the podium is the proudest moment in an athlete's life and I will want to experience that for myself in London."

Mirza was referred to as "Pakistan's daughter-in-law" and unfit to be a representative of an Indian state after she was appointed the Telangana state's brand ambassador. The comment referred to Mirza's husband, Shoaib Malik, being a Pakistani cricketer. Telangana chief minister Kalvakuntla Chandrashekar Rao presented Mirza with ₹1 crore on two occasions. She was summoned by the tax department for non-payment of service tax on the payment received, however she responded that the ₹1 crore given was training incentive, and not towards becoming state's brand ambassador.

== Career statistics ==
=== Grand Slam performance timelines ===
Key
W	F	SF	QF	#R	RR	Q#	P#	DNQ	A	Z#	PO	G	S	B	NMS	NTI	P	NH

(W) winner; (F) finalist; (SF) semifinalist; (QF) quarterfinalist; (#R) rounds 4, 3, 2, 1; (RR) round-robin stage; (Q#) qualification round; (P#) preliminary round; (DNQ) did not qualify; (A) absent; (Z#) Davis/Fed Cup Zonal Group (with number indication) or (PO) play-off; (G) gold, (S) silver or (B) bronze Olympic/Paralympic medal; (NMS) not a Masters tournament; (NTI) not a Tier I tournament; (P) postponed; (NH) not held; (SR) strike rate (events won / competed); (W–L) win–loss record.
To avoid confusion and double counting, these charts are updated at the conclusion of a tournament or when the player's participation has ended.

==== Women's doubles ====
Tournament	2004	2005	2006	2007	2008	2009	2010	2011	2012	2013	2014	2015	2016	2017	...	2020	2021	2022	2023	SR	W–L
Australian Open	A	A	1R	3R	3R	1R	3R	1R	SF	1R	QF	2R	W	3R		1R	A	1R	2R	1 / 15	23–14
French Open	A	2R	3R	1R	A	2R	A	F	1R	3R	QF	QF	3R	1R		A	A	3R	A	0 / 12	19–11
Wimbledon	Q1	1R	2R	3R	QF	2R	2R	SF	3R	3R	2R	W	QF	3R		NH	2R	1R	A	1 / 15	29–13
US Open	A	1R	3R	QF	A	2R	1R	3R	3R	SF	SF	W	QF	SF		A	1R	A	A	1 / 13	31–12
Win–loss	0–0	1–3	5–4	7–4	5–2	3–4	3–3	11–4	8–4	8–4	11–4	16–2	14–3	8–4		0–1	1–2	2–3	1–1	3 / 55	104–52

==== Mixed doubles ====
Tournament	2005	2006	2007	2008	2009	2010	2011	2012	2013	2014	2015	2016	2017	...	2021	2022	2023	SR	W–L
Australian Open	A	1R	1R	F	W	A	A	SF	QF	F	SF	SF	F		A	QF	F	1 / 12	32–11
French Open	A	1R	2R	A	1R	A	1R	W	1R	2R	1R	F	QF		A	2R	A	1 / 11	17–10
Wimbledon	2R	3R	2R	2R	3R	A	QF	2R	QF	3R	QF	2R	3R		3R	SF	A	0 / 14	28–14
US Open	A	1R	QF	A	2R	A	1R	QF	1R	W	1R	2R	1R		1R	A	A	1 / 11	14–10
Win–loss	0–0	1–3	5–4	7–4	6–3	2–3	3–3	11–4	8–4	8–4	11–4	16–2	14–3		2–2	6–3	3–1	3 / 48	91–45

=== Grand Slam finals ===
==== Doubles: 4 (3 titles, 1 runner-up) ====
Result	Year	Championship	Surface	Partner	Opponents	Score
Loss	2011	French Open	Clay	(Russia) Elena Vesnina	(Czech Republic) Andrea Hlaváčková (Czech Republic) Lucie Hradecká	4–6, 3–6
Win	2015	Wimbledon	Grass	(Switzerland) Martina Hingis	(Russia) Ekaterina Makarova (Russia) Elena Vesnina	5–7, 7–6^{(4)}, 7–5
Win	2015	US Open	Hard	(Switzerland) Martina Hingis	(Australia) Casey Dellacqua; (Kazakhstan) Yaroslava Shvedova	6–3, 6–3
Win	2016	Australian Open	Hard	(Switzerland) Martina Hingis	(Czech Republic) Andrea Hlaváčková (Czech Republic) Lucie Hradecká	7–6^{(1)}, 6–3

==== Mixed doubles: 8 (3 titles, 5 runner-ups) ====
Result	Year	Championship	Surface	Partner	Opponents	Score
Loss	2008	Australian Open	Hard	(India) Mahesh Bhupathi	(China) Sun Tiantian (Serbia) Nenad Zimonjić	6–7^{(4)}, 4–6
Win	2009	Australian Open	Hard	(India) Mahesh Bhupathi	(France) Nathalie Dechy (Israel) Andy Ram	6–3, 6–1
Win	2012	French Open	Clay	(India) Mahesh Bhupathi	(Poland) Klaudia Jans-Ignacik (Mexico) Santiago González	7–6^{(3)}, 6–1
Loss	2014	Australian Open	Hard	(Romania) Horia Tecău	(France) Kristina Mladenovic (Canada) Daniel Nestor	3–6, 2–6
Win	2014	US Open	Hard	(Brazil) Bruno Soares	(United States) Abigail Spears (Mexico) Santiago González	6–1, 2–6, [11–9]
Loss	2016	French Open	Clay	(Croatia) Ivan Dodig	(Switzerland) Martina Hingis (India) Leander Paes	6–4, 4–6, [8–10]
Loss	2017	Australian Open	Hard	(Croatia) Ivan Dodig	(United States) Abigail Spears (Colombia) Juan Sebastián Cabal	2–6, 4–6
Loss	2023	Australian Open	Hard	(India) Rohan Bopanna	(Brazil) Luisa Stefani (Brazil) Rafael Matos	6–7^{(2–7)}, 2–6

== Autobiography ==
In July 2016, Mirza published an autobiography titled Ace Against Odds chronicling her journey to the top. The book also lists some of her memorable encounters on and off the court and talks about the people and relationships that have contributed to Mirza's growth as a person and a sportsperson.

== See also ==
- Muslim women in sport

Awards and achievements
Preceded by (France) Tatiana Golovin	WTA Newcomer of the Year; 2005	Succeeded by (Poland) Agnieszka Radwańska
Preceded by (Italy) Sara Errani & (Italy) Roberta Vinci	WTA Doubles Team of the Year (with (Switzerland) Martina Hingis); 2015	Succeeded by (France) Caroline Garcia & (France) Kristina Mladenovic
Preceded by (Italy) Sara Errani & (Italy) Roberta Vinci	ITF Doubles World Champion (with (Switzerland) Martina Hingis); 2015	Succeeded by (France) Caroline Garcia & (France) Kristina Mladenovic
Preceded by Ronjan Sodhi	Rajiv Gandhi Khel Ratna; 2015	Succeeded by P. V. Sindhu, Dipa Karmakar, Jitu Rai, and Sakshi Malik
