= 2003 Afro-Asian Games =

Multi-sport event held in Hyderabad, India 2003

I Afro-Asian Games
- The logo (left) and mascot Sheroo (right) of the 2003 Afro-Asian Games. The logo shows the Charminar, Hyderabad's most famous landmark, surrounded by a string of pearls. The mascot is named Sheroo, a lion.
- Host city: Hyderabad-Secunderabad, India
- Motto: "Two Continents, One Spirit"; Theme song: Come Together To Celebrate Afro-Asian Games
- Nations: 96
- Athletes: 2,040
- Sport: 8
- Events: 131 (75 men's events, 55 women's events, 1 combined event)
- Opening: 24 October 2003
- Closing: 1 November 2003
- Opened by: L. K. Advani (Deputy Prime Minister of India)
- Closed by: A. P. J. Abdul Kalam (President of India)
- Athlete's Oath: Anjali Bhagwat
- Main venue: Gachibowli Athletic Stadium
- Website: afroasiangames.org

The 2003 Afro-Asian Games, officially known as the First Afro-Asian Games or I Afro-Asian Games and unofficially known as the Inaugural Afro-Asian Games, was a major international multi-sport event held in Hyderabad, India, from 24 October (excluding football and hockey, which began on 22 October and 23 October respectively) to 1 November 2003.

The Afro-Asian Games was the largest sporting event ever to be held in Hyderabad, and one of the largest in India, second only to the 2010 Commonwealth Games by athletes' volume. The scale of these Games exceeds even the two Asian Games held in Delhi in 1951 (both by athletes' volume and by number of participating nations) and 1982 (by number of participating nations). More than 2000 athletes from 96 countries competed in the Games. A total of 131 sporting events in eight disciplines were conducted. Also, 120 countries sent 1,565 official representatives to these Games.

The first Afro-Asian Games were held after nearly two decades of delays, shifts and cancellations. The prolonged amount of time for these Games considerably reduced interest in them. After the preliminary decision of hosting the Games, the venue was shuttled between New Delhi and Kuwait City. At the last moment, New Delhi was out favoured by Hyderabad, which had hosted the National Games of India in 2002.

These Games, however, had lesser scope than the Asian Games or Commonwealth Games, since 96 nations participated in only eight disciplines. The Games witnessed only one new world record. Thirty-seven countries – an unprecedented 39% of the participating nations – won at least one medal in these Games.

== History ==
The idea to hold an inter-continental sporting event between Asia and Africa was initiated in April 1983, with New Delhi as the proposed venue. However, for unknown circumstances, the venue was shifted to Kuwait and the Games were proposed to be held in 1985. Political instability led to the cancellation of the Games. In 1989, the proposal was reconsidered, with New Delhi again chosen as the venue for the Games. The Games were then scheduled for 1991. The plans went wrong due to inefficient communication between the members, and so could not come into force.

In 1999, a proposal for the renewal of the Games was accepted. Subsequently, Pune and then New Delhi were proposed as venues. However, they were postponed till November 2001. Slow preparations led to indefinite postponement again. After the occurrence of 9/11, Delhi pulled out. This led to the circulation of rumours that the games were "jinxed". Later, the IOA announced that the Olympic Council of Asia (OCA) and the Association of National Olympic Committees of Africa (ANOCA) had sanctioned 2003 as the new date for the Games. Also, the venue was changed to Hyderabad after Delhi pulled out. Most critics point to the successful hosting of the 32nd National Games of India, which were held at Hyderabad, as the main reason for Hyderabad being chosen.

== Preparation ==
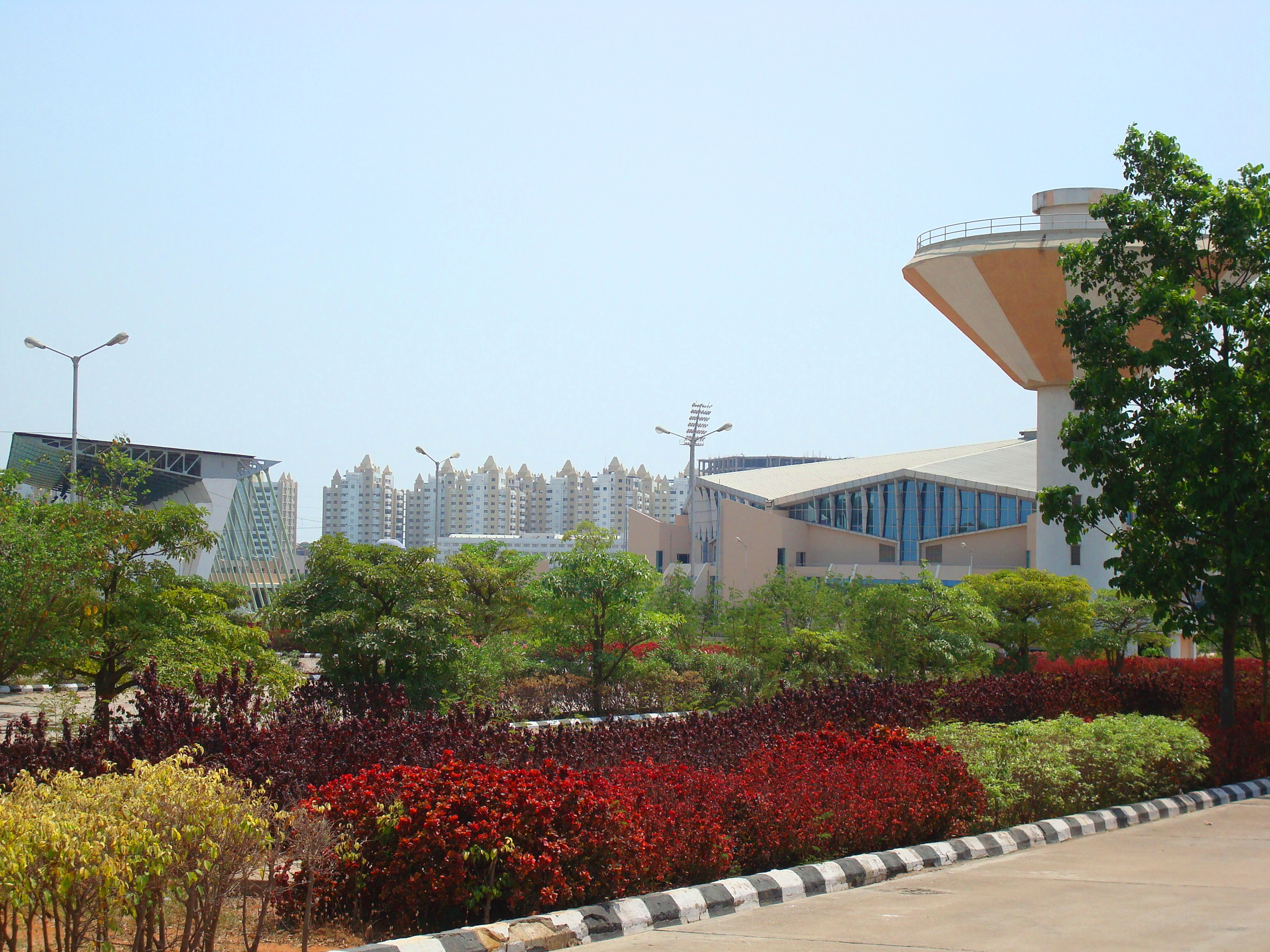
A view of Gachibowli, the Hyderabadean suburb which hosted the Games

The Indian Government spent ₹ 1.03 billion (US$22.92 million), for the Afro-Asian Games, making these Games one of the most expensive sporting events held in Hyderabad. All preparations were completed within 60 days before the events began.

=== General preparation ===
The Indian Olympic Association (IOA) decided to set up a central head of the development for the Games. Thus, the Afro-Asian Games Secretariat was set up at the Greenlands Guest House to organize, monitor and manage all the activities related to the Games. 17 functional organizing sub-committees were formed to oversee the development of the venues and other infrastructure. The various functions were divided within these committees. The special officer-in-charge of the Games was Sabyasachi Ghosh, while the Secretary-General of the Games was Ali Moradi.

A large development Planning Association meant a great amount of inter-connectivity and communication requirements. A 24-hour call centre with interpreters was set up, using a Closed User Group (CUG) circuit.

A large "web" of networking facilities was built to connect all the hotels, media centres, stadia and Transportation Committees. This would help in easing pressure on any one committee. Since the African continent is not very well-connected, an Accreditation Committee was dispatched to Abuja - in Nigeria - the host city of the 2003 All-Africa Games. The Accreditation committee brought all sports-persons and officials from Africa to Hyderabad.

=== Technology ===
The software company CMC Limited had developed a Games and Event Management System (GEMS), which helped the organizers to efficiently manage events across the sports venues. It worked closely with Doordarshan, the official television broadcasters of the Games, to provide results of sporting competitions and live Games information. Additionally, cutting-edge technology like the implementation of geo-referenced maps and Geographic Information System (GIS) was implemented, so as to ensure a smooth and rapid flow of work.

=== Transport ===
In the month of September, less than a month away from the Afro-Asian Games, the Transport Ministry of Hyderabad released a large number of luxury vehicles, to be used in the Games. It was the second time in the span of one year that the Transport Ministry had done so - the first time being for the 32nd National Games of India. In an effort to spruce up the city in time for the Games, the organizers arranged several buses, vans and cars to ferry the athletes and the guests.

=== Accommodation ===
Accommodation of the athletes and foreign officials posed a serious problem to the organisers. Contrary to what the Olympics and related multi-sport events provide, no actual Games Village was available for the athletes to stay. The Sports Authority of Andhra Pradesh (SAAP) had initially wanted to have a separate Games Village for the Games, but could not arrange for it. Even though Hyderabad had hosted the 32nd National Games of India in 2002, for which a Games Village had been built, the organizers could not utilise it due to severe financial problems. It was estimated that about ₹ 800 million (US$16 million) would be required to upgrade the existing Games Village. The Government of Andhra Pradesh and the Sports Authority of Andhra Pradesh (SAAP) instead opted to obtain bulk bookings from all the major hotels in the city so as to provide accommodation for the athletes, foreign dignitaries and the media.

=== Security ===
About 1400 police personnel were drawn from various districts of Andhra Pradesh to provide the first layer of security. In addition to this, over 5000 city policemen were deployed in various places, including the event venues and all the major hotels of the city. Strict anti-sabotage measures were taken to provide security at the athlete hotels. Also, a 24-hour access control system was placed, with sniffer dogs used to sanitise the area.

To facilitate foreign athletes and officials, four immigration counters were set up at the airport. A time limit of 30 minutes was laid down to clear any athlete or official. To improve security speed, six interpreters of Russian, Japanese, Mandarin Chinese, Korean, French and Arabic were present at the airport. In addition, 24 specially trained immigration personnel were stationed round the clock in the airport.

== Pressure on Organizing Committee ==
There was a lot of pressure upon the Secretariat for the smooth performance of these Games, as the IOA would keenly observe the Afro-Asian Games, in preparation for the 2010 Commonwealth Games at Delhi, India. Also, officials from Beijing, China - the venue of 2008 Summer Olympics - and Doha, Qatar - the host of 2006 Asian Games - would attend the Afro-Asian Games, and keenly observe the way the Games functioned.

However, hosting of the Games was not the only major issue for the committee. The Afro-Asian Games would see the participation of various nations which are not in good terms with some other nations. The then Prime Minister of India, Atal Behari Vajpayee, had hinted that "some nations might withdraw from the Games, rather than get embroiled in international conflicts".

== Marketing ==
Logo

The logo of the Afro-Asian Games was the Charminar - Hyderabad's most famous landmark - surrounded by a string of pearls. Hyderabad is also famous for its pearls. The official logo of the Games was unveiled, along with the official website, by Chief Minister Chandrababu Naidu on 3 September 2003.

Mascot

The Mascot for these Games was Sheroo, also spelt Sheru, a cartoon lion. Subsequently, a variation of the name 'Sheroo', called 'Shera', was also given for the mascot of the 2010 Commonwealth Games.

Sponsorships

Several Indian corporates such as Indian Oil Corporation (IOC), GVK Group and State Bank of Hyderabad provided sponsorships worth INR 10 million each towards the staging of several events of the inaugural Games. Several other corporates such as Oil and Natural Gas Corporation (ONGC), Videocon and Bharat Petroleum Corporation Limited (BPCL) also contributed to the Games. Also, Florida-based IMG Academy assisted in the conduct of the Games.

== Participating countries ==
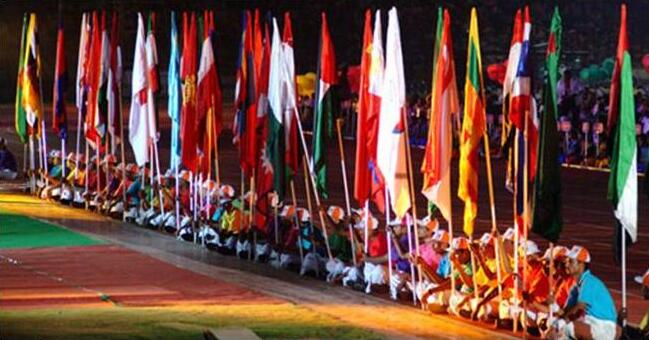
A view of the participants' flag-bearers

The First Afro-Asian Games were the first time that Asia and Africa came together for such a large event. 43 Asian and 53 African nations participated in this sporting event.

Below is a list of all the participating countries in the Inaugural Afro-Asian Games.

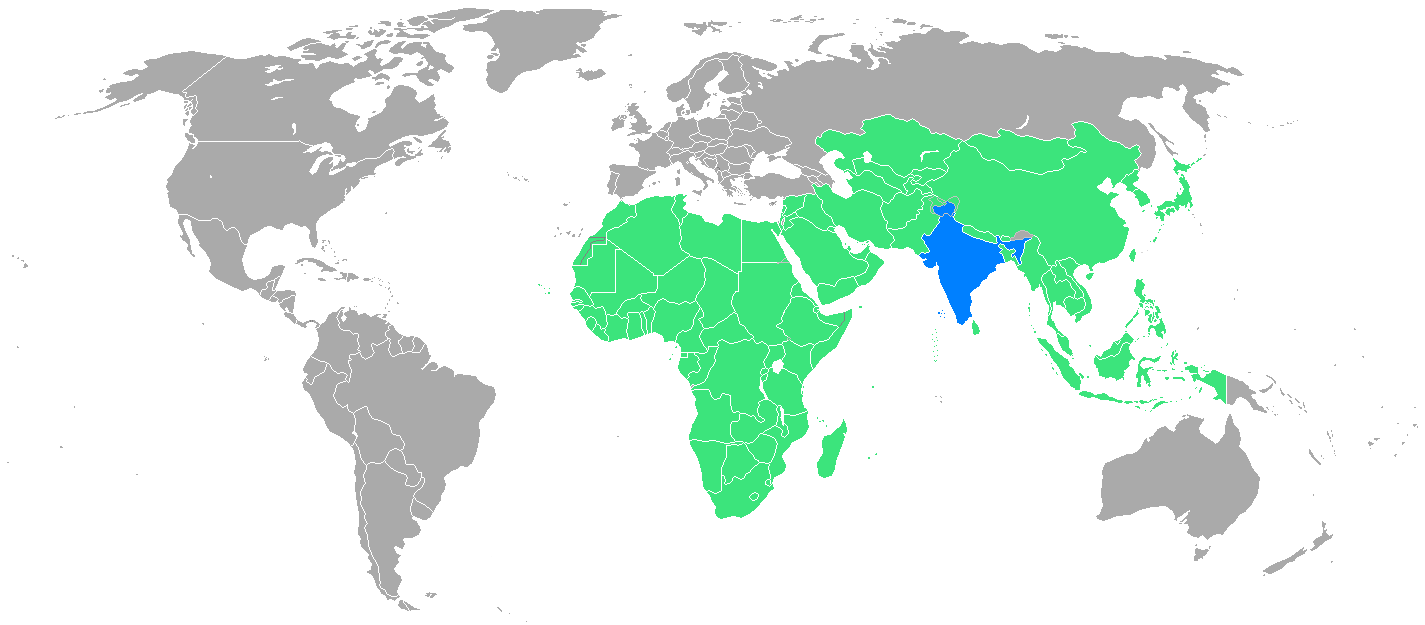
Participating nations

- Afghanistan
- Algeria
- Angola
- Bahrain
- Bangladesh
- Benin
- Bhutan
- Botswana
- Brunei
- Burkina Faso
- Burundi
- Cambodia
- Cameroon
- Cape Verde
- Central African Republic
- Chad
- People's Republic of China (108)
- Chinese Taipei
- Comoros
- Republic of the Congo
- DR Congo
- Djibouti
- Egypt
- Ethiopia
- Equatorial Guinea
- Eritrea
- Gabon
- Gambia
- Ghana
- Guinea
- Guinea-Bissau
- Hong Kong
- India (host)
- Indonesia
- Islamic Republic of Iran
- Iraq
- Côte d'Ivoire
- Japan
- Jordan
- Kazakhstan
- Kenya
- Kuwait
- Kyrgyzstan
- Laos
- Lebanon
- Lesotho
- Liberia
- Libya
- Madagascar
- Malaysia
- Malawi
- Maldives
- Mali
- Mauritania
- Mauritius
- Mongolia
- Morocco
- Mozambique
- Myanmar
- Namibia
- Nepal
- Niger
- Nigeria
- North Korea
- Oman
- Pakistan
- Palestine
- Philippines
- Qatar
- Rwanda
- São Tomé and Príncipe
- Saudi Arabia
- Sierra Leone
- Senegal
- Seychelles
- Singapore
- Somalia
- South Africa
- South Korea
- Sri Lanka
- Sudan
- Swaziland
- Syrian Arab Republic
- Tajikistan
- United Republic of Tanzania
- Thailand
- Togo
- Tunisia
- Turkmenistan
- Uganda
- United Arab Emirates
- Uzbekistan
- Vietnam
- Yemen
- Zambia
- Zimbabwe

== Venues ==
The events of the Games were held across eight stadiums, spread throughout the suburb of Gachibowli. The venues were:

Gachibowli
Gachibowli Athletic Stadium; Capacity: 30,000; Events: Opening and closing ceremonies, Athletics, Boxing, Football	Kotla Vijay Bhaskar Reddy Indoor Stadium; Capacity: 2,000; Events: Weightlifting	Lal Bahadur Shastri Stadium; Capacity: 30,000; Events: Football	Gachibowli Hockey Stadium; Capacity: 8,000; Events: Hockey
Gachibowli
Central University Shooting Range; Capacity: 600; Events: Shooting	Aquatics Complex; Capacity: 2,000; Events: Swimming	SAAP Tennis Complex; Capacity: 4,000; Events: Tennis	G. M. C. Balayogi SATS Indoor Stadium; Capacity: 4,000; Events: Boxing

== Sports ==
The program of the Afro-Asian Games was almost the same as that of the Asian Games, the only difference being in the number of sports. These Games witnessed eight disciplines in eight sports. Synchronised swimming and diving were not contested.

The list of sports is given below (Number in parentheses indicates number of events).

- Athletics (41)
- Boxing (11)
- Football (1)
- Field hockey (2)
- Shooting (16)
- Swimming (38)
- Tennis (7)
- Weightlifting (15)

=== Calendar ===
The 2003 Afro-Asian Games Calendar is given below.

●	Opening ceremony	●	Event competitions	●	Event finals	●	Closing ceremony

October	22	23	24	25	26		27		28		29	30		31	November 1	Gold medal(s)
Ceremonies			●												●	-
Athletics									● ● ● ● ● ● ● ●		● ● ● ● ● ● ● ● ● ● ● ● ● ● ● ● ●	● ● ● ● ● ● ● ● ● ● ● ● ● ● ● ● ●				42
Boxing				● ● ● ● ● ● ● ●	● ● ● ● ● ● ● ● ● ● ● ● ● ●		● ● ● ● ● ● ● ● ●				● ● ● ● ● ● ● ● ● ● ● ●	● ● ● ● ● ● ● ● ● ●		● ● ● ● ● ● ● ● ● ● ●		11
Football	●	● ●	●	● ●	●		● ●				● ●			●		1
Hockey		● ● ● ● ● ● ●	● ● ● ●	● ● ● ● ●	● ● ● ●		● ● ● ●		● ● ● ●		● ● ● ●	●		●		2
Shooting*					● ●	● ●	● ●	● ● ●	● ●	●	● ● ●	● ●		● ● ●		14
Swimming				● ● ● ● ● ●	● ● ● ● ● ● ● ●		● ● ● ● ● ●		● ● ● ● ● ●		● ● ● ● ● ●	● ● ● ● ● ●				38
Tennis				● ● ● ● ● ● ● ● ● ● ● ● ● ● ● ● ● ● ● ● ● ● ● ●	● ● ● ● ● ● ● ● ● ● ● ● ● ● ● ●		● ● ● ● ● ● ● ● ● ● ● ●	● ●	● ● ● ● ● ● ● ● ● ● ● ● ● ● ● ●		● ● ● ● ● ● ● ● ● ● ● ●	●	● ●	● ● ●		7
Weightlifting				● ●	● ●		● ●		● ●		● ●	● ●		● ● ●		15
Total Gold medals				8	12		13		17		28	30		22		130
Cumulative total				8	20		33		50		78	108		130		130
October	22	23	24	25	26		27		28		29	30		31	November 1	Gold medal(s)

* The shooting events include 50 birds and 75 birds events.

=== Qualification ===
Qualification for the Games depended upon the performance of the countries in other major multi-sport events. Since these Games featured delegations from two continents, the qualification criteria for nations from the different continents was different. The qualification of the African nations was based on their performance in the 2003 All-Africa Games held in Abuja, Nigeria. The qualification for the Asian nations was based on their performance in the 2002 Asian Games held in Busan, South Korea.

== Media coverage ==
=== Television ===
The official television host broadcaster of the Afro-Asian Games was DD Sports, India's first sports channel. The experience gained through broadcasting these Games would prove to be extremely helpful for its parent company Doordarshan, as they broadcast the 2004 Olympic Games live and would later telecast the 2010 Commonwealth Games. However, the schedule of the Games clashed with an ongoing Triangular Cricket Tournament, and the events were aired on DD Metro. Doordarshan deployed 350 personnel, 10 outdoor broadcasting vans and 86 cameras for obtaining coverage of the Games. Additionally, five cameras were used for the Sports news and the sidelights.

=== Radio ===
Commentators we have taken are the best in the country. We have not spared any expenditure in this regard.

— K S Sharma, CEO, Prasar Bharati

India's premier radio broadcaster, the All India Radio (A.I.R), was the official radio partner of the Games. The AIR hired 150 programmers and engineers for the coverage of the Games.

== Ceremonies ==
The opening and closing ceremonies were described as "eye-filling" and "opulent" by several media centers. The ceremonies cost INR 150 million (US$3.34 million) to execute. Children from India, China and some African nations had practiced for a reported 21 days to ensure the success of the beginning and the end of the Inaugural Games. The settings utilised for the ceremonies were designed by well-known art director and film production designer Nitin Chandrakant Desai.

=== Opening ceremony ===
The opening ceremony of the Games were held in the G. M. C. Balayogi Stadium - the main stadium of the events - at 5:30 pm IST. The organisers considered it as "a benchmark of the Games". The opening ceremony of the Games showcased the cultural heritage of both the attending continents - Asia and Africa. 30,000 people came to watch the beginning of the gala sporting event. The ceremony, which was hosted by Bollywood actor Priyanka Chopra, was spread over a time period of two hours and forty minutes. Many celebrities, like actor Sanjay Dutt and tennis player Leander Paes graced the occasion. Also, six-time pole vault winner Sergey Bubka, along with his wife, attended the ceremony.

Around 12,000 schoolchildren and college students came up with a show depicting the vast and vibrant culture of the two continents.

Chief Guest Deputy Prime Minister L. K. Advani declared the Games open. Shooter Anjali Bhagwat took the Athlete's Oath. This was followed by a laser show, fireworks and a space cannon show. The highlight of the opening ceremony was the Umojas - a group of professional tribal dancers from Africa. There were other international showcases - the spiritual chanting by the Chinese monks, and the peace prayers by thousands of schoolchildren. Singer Shankar Mahadevan sang the theme song. Bollywood divas Shilpa Shetty, Simran and Urmila Matondkar did dance performances.

Unlike the Olympic Games, there was no individual march past for the countries. The countries came in batches of two - Asian countries in one batch and African countries in another.

=== Closing ceremony ===
The closing ceremony of the Games was marked by lights, colour and technology.

The closing ceremony was hosted by Yukta Mookhey. President A. P. J. Abdul Kalam officially closed the Games, in front of a near capacity crowd. His closing words were : "I congratulate all the athletes and officials who were part of the Games. When I see thousands of sportspersons I am sure the combined power of youth through sport will be the most powerful resource on earth." As he did so, the Stadium was lit up in a pyrotechnics display, and fireworks burst in the sky. A "daredevil" act was done by a few service personnel, who came riding on motorcycles. A fly-past of the Indian Army airplanes, trailing smoke in the colours of the Indian flag took place as the dignitaries took their seats.

The expected "high-point" of the closing ceremony was the show of camaraderie between the sportspersons of the two continents. However, few athletes trooped into the Stadium for that purpose. The "camaraderie ceremony" was followed by speeches of various important people, among them being IOA President Suresh Kalmadi, IOA and OCA Secretary-General Randhir Singh, ANOCA President Alfa Ibrahim Diallo, Andhra Pradesh Chief Minister Chandrababu Naidu and Union Minister for Youth Affairs and Sports Vikram Verma. The speeches were shortly followed by a memento presentation.

As night fell, hundreds of Army recruits brought lighted torches, and did the "mashal dance". Laser lights and several technological innovations followed. Sheroo, the mascot, was bid farewell by noted Indian singer Hariharan and many costumed children. The Umojas performed yet again at the closing ceremony. The Chinese State circus was considered "breath-taking". Lebanese singer Diana Haddad, Egyptian singer Hisham Abbas and Indian singer Remo Fernandes performed at the closing ceremony as well.

The host country was portrayed by a number of traditional folk dances, after which the Games officially ended.

== Highlights ==
- Africa was the clear leader in the athletics, winning 73 medals as compared to Asia's 47, even though the maximum number of nation-wise medals were garnered by Asian nations (China and India).
- Four time Olympic medallist Frankie Fredericks (Namibia) won the 200 metres race – the last major tournament win of his distinguished 17-year-long career.
- Indian tennis player Sania Mirza won four gold medals in the tournament, thereby becoming the most gold-medals winner in the tennis tournament.
- Sun Dan, a 19-year-old Chinese Army officer of the 75-kg category, lifted a weight of 168.5 kg, breaking the previous world record of 168 kg (set by her compatriot Tang Gonghong). In addition, Nigerian athlete Mike Eamson hoisted a weight of 210 kg, which was the heaviest weight ever lifted in India according to the organisers.
- Asia won the dual-continental event with 82 gold medals, against Africa's 49.

== Medal table ==
The official medal tally of the Afro-Asian Games is given below. China bagged the largest number of gold medals, followed by the host India in second place. Athletes from India won the most number of total medals, with 80.

* Host nation (India)

Rank	Nation	Gold	Silver	Bronze	Total
1	China	25	11	5	41
2	India*	19	32	29	80
3	Japan	15	6	2	23
4	Nigeria	10	12	13	35
5	South Africa	10	11	15	36
6	South Korea	7	6	11	24
7	Algeria	7	6	9	22
–	Rest of Africa	7	5	0	12
8	Uzbekistan	7	2	3	12
9	Kazakhstan	5	8	6	19
10	Ethiopia	5	5	3	13
Totals (10 entries)		117	104	96	317

== Legacy ==
The success of the Games was a point in favor of India being able to host a major international sporting event. Subsequently, this success was used in the bidding of the 2010 Commonwealth Games, which was ultimately awarded to Delhi.

In addition, the hospitality sector received a major boost due to the games, as hotels and guest houses received large booking orders from people who were coming to see the Games – media-persons, delegates, officials, visitors, sports-persons, etc. Tourism also benefited from the Games, and the State Tourism Department showed many foreign journalists key tourism spots in the city. Many famous places such as the Charminar and the Chowmahalla Palace saw record number of visitors.

Also, famous local markets witnessed exceptional growth in sales and business, as demand peaked during the Games. Business of the world-renowned pearls of Hyderabad increased by about 50%, generating revenue of ₹ 50 million in one week. The rise in buyers was mainly driven by African visitors, who prefer pearls as jewellery. Also, sale of gold jewellery increased substantially, being driven by a large number of Muslim visitors who looked for traditional and intricate designs. In addition, bangles became the center of attraction for Chinese and African athletes.

== See also ==
- 2002 National Games of India

Preceded by -	Afro-Asian Games; Host City; I Afro-Asian Games (2003)	Succeeded by Algiers
