= 2002 National Games of India =

Multi-sport event in Andhra Pradesh, India

XXXII National Games of India
- Host city: Hyderabad, Secunderabad, and Visakhapatnam
- Teams: 33
- Athletes: 5,887
- Events: 31
- Opening: 13 December 2002
- Closing: 22 December 2002
- Opened by: A. P. J. Abdul Kalam (President of India)
- Closed by: Atal Bihari Vajpayee (Prime Minister of India)
- Main venue: G. M. C. Balayogi Indoor Stadium, Gachibowli, Hyderabad

The 2002 National Games, also known as the 32nd National Games of India and informally as Andhra Pradesh 2002, was the 32nd edition of the National Games of India, held from 13 December 2002 to 22 December 2002 in Hyderabad, Secunderabad and Visakhapatnam, Andhra Pradesh.

President, Dr. A. P. J. Abdul Kalam inaugurated the 32nd National Games at the Gachibowli Stadium. The mascot was Veera, Ongole bull. The opening and closing ceremonies featuring laser shows, fireworks and entertainment from movie stars like Amitabh Bachchan and Aishwarya Rai.

5,887 athletes in 31 disciplines- including roller-skating, introduced at Chief Minister of Andhra Pradesh N. Chandrababu Naidu's behest- took part in the Games distributed between Hyderabad and Visakhapatnam.

Andhra Pradesh state government spent ₹184 crore (US$19 million), including a loan of ₹150 crore (US$16 million) from Housing and Urban Development Corporation (HUDCO) for the creation of massive infrastructure, import of state-of-the-art sporting equipment and upgrading of existing facilities. The matches of hockey were played at astro turf at the Police Hockey Stadium, Begumpet. Andhra Pradesh government's emphasis on sports in 2002 saw the emergence of outstanding sportspersons like Pullela Gopichand, Saina Nehwal and Sania Mirza.

== Medal tally ==
* Host nation ( Andhra Pradesh)

| Rank | State | Gold | Silver | Bronze | Total |
|---|---|---|---|---|---|
| 1 | Andhra Pradesh* | 93 | 17 | 20 | 130 |
| 2 | Punjab | 48 | 39 | 40 | 127 |
| 3 | Services | 47 | 46 | 37 | 130 |
| Totals (3 entries) | | 188 | 102 | 97 | 387 |

== Closing ceremony ==
Capacity crowd witnessed the closing ceremony. Prime Minister of India Atal Bihari Vajpayee was present at the ceremony. Indian Olympic Association president Suresh Kalmadi declared the Games closed in the presence of Prime Minister Atal Bihari Vajpayee.

== See also ==
- 2003 Afro-Asian Games

| Preceded by 2001 National Games of India | National Games of India | Succeeded by 2007 National Games of India |
