= National Games of India =

Indian sporting event

National Games of India Rāṣṭrīya Khēla
- Abbreviation: NGI
- Motto: "Get Set Play"
- Frequency: Every 2 years, sometimes uneven
- Inaugurated: 1924; 102 years ago
- Most recent: 2025
- Headquarters: Olympic Bhawan, B-29, Qutub Institutional Area, South West Delhi
- Website: olympic.ind.in

The National Games of India (ISO: Rāṣṭrīya Khēla) consist of various disciplines in which athletes from the different states of India participate against each other. The country's first few Olympic Games, now renamed as National Games, were held in Lahore (now in Pakistan), Delhi, Allahabad, Patiala, Madras, Calcutta and Bombay.

== History ==
=== Indian Olympic Games (early National Games) ===
In the early 1920s, the Indian chapter of the Olympic movement was born, and India participated in the 1920 Antwerp Olympics. As part of this movement, a provisional Indian Olympic Association (IOA) came about by 1924, and the Indian Olympic Games were held in Feb 1924 in Delhi to select Indian competitors for the 1924 Paris Olympics. IOA Secretary Dr. Noehren wrote about these games as follows: "The All India Athletic Carnival, the greatest and most representative gathering of its kind ever to be held in India, was recently celebrated in Delhi...Seventy athletes, representing practically every province and State in the Empire, comprising Hindus, Muslims, Anglo-Indians and Sinhalese, ate their food around the same table and mingled intimately in the cramped and uncomfortable quarters provided."

The games were then held every two years, and were renamed as National Games during the 9th Games in Bombay in 1940. Indian Olympic Association, the sports organising body of the nation, mooted the concept of the National Games to promote the development of sports and of the Olympic movement in India, and was responsible for host city selection.

Each games was organised by the host city sports association, and each had its unique challenges. For example, in late 1949, the Bengal Provincial Olympic Association, whose turn it was to hold the next national games, could not do so, and the IOA President Maharaja of Patiala then asked Bombay to host the games; it had just three months to organise the event. Bombay government ministers and Bombay olympic association officials then worked to hold the 1950 National Games in Bombay in early February 1950.

While held at various cities, the organisation of each national games was roughly similar, with an overarching 'Jury of Honour and Appeal' comprising the main officials for the games; and other officials such as a General Manager and Managers; Referee; Official Surveyor; Judges; Starters; Clerks of the Course; Recorders; Announcers; Scorers; Marshals; and Photographers.

For example, at the 11th Games in Patiala, Feb 1944, the Jury of Honor and Appeal comprised Moinul Haq (Chair), N. Ahmed, S. K. Mukherjee, S. de Noronha, Sohrab Bhoot, J. N. Khosla, Raja Birindra Singh, A. C. Dass, M. S. Ahluwalia, BR Kagal, CR Dhodapkar, Nawab Hussain, S. V. Lingras, Dr. Kailash Singh, N. N. Kunzru, and P. K. Varghese. And the officials included 6 Managers for various sports, General Manager Kirpa Narain, announcers Bashir Ali Sheikh and Prem Kumar, and several judges.

At the 13th Games in Lucknow, Feb. 1948, the Jury of Honour and Appeal comprised Moinul Haq (Chair), M. Sultan, Sohrab Bhoot, D. N. Sharma, M. G. Nageshkar, Raja Bhalinder Singh, B. C. Holanti, Rameshwar Dayal, S. de Noronha, P. K. Verghese, N. Ahmed, A. C. Das, Kirpa Narain, P. C. Joshi, G. D. Sondhi, Janki Das, Harbail Singh, Vasant Captain, and A. R. Khanna. And the officials included General Manager M. Sultan and 8 Managers for various sports; Referee G. D. Sondhi; Official Surveyors G. D. Sondhi, N. Ahmed, Sohrab Bhoot, and M. Sultan; announcer David Abraham; and several judges and other officials.

At the 14th Games in Bombay, Feb 1950, the Jury of Honour and Appeal comprised G. D. Sondhi (Chair), N. Ahmed, R. Narain, Sohrab Bhoot, M. Sultan, R. Dayal, F. C. Aurora, S. S. Dhawan, Bhalinder Singh, M. G. Nageshkar, A. S. de Mello, S. K. Basu, B. C. Mahante, and C. C. Abraham. And the officials included Referee Moinul Haq; Manager in Chief Sohrab Bhoot; Managers Nariman Saugar and Y. A. Gole; announcer David Abraham; and judges and other officials.

=== Modern National Games of India ===
For several years in the mid-twentieth century, the national games were conducted on a low key note. However, the first Modern National Games on the lines of the Olympics were held in 1985 in New Delhi. Thereafter Kerala (1987), Pune, Maharashtra (1994), Bangalore, Karnataka (1997), Manipur (1999), Ludhiana, Punjab (2001), Hyderabad, Andhra Pradesh (2002), Guwahati, Assam (2007), Ranchi, Jharkhand (2011), Trivandrum, Kerala (2015) and Ahmedabad, Gujarat (2022) hosted the Games. Like the early games, the modern games had their challenges: for example, a decision on the sixth modern National Games in Ludhiana, Punjab was delayed because the Central Government diverted funding for the first Afro-Asian Games. The National Games were normally to be held every two years, leaving those years in which the Olympic Games and Asian Games are scheduled. In exceptional cases or natural calamity, the Indian Olympic Association (IOA) can relax the general rule. In practice, the games were often held at three to four year intervals in the 1990s, 2000s, and 2010s.

In recent editions, an emphasis has been placed on including and promoting traditional Indian games such as kho-kho and sqay.

== All editions ==
=== Summer ===
List of National Games of India
Edition	Year	Host(s)	Start date	End date	Sports	Events	Teams	Competitors	Top placed team
Indian Olympic Games
1	1924	Lahore							
2	1926	Lahore							
3	1928	Lahore							
4	1930	Allahabad							
5	1932	Madras							
6	1934	New Delhi							
7	1936	Lahore							
8	1938	Calcutta							
National Games
9	1940	Bombay							
10	1942	Patiala							
11	1944	Lahore							
12	1946	Lahore							
13	1948	Lucknow							
14	1952	Madras							
15	1953	Jabalpur							
16	1954	New Delhi							
17	1956	Patiala							
18	1958	Cuttack							
19	1960	New Delhi							
20	1962	Jabalpur							
21	1964	Calcutta							
22	1966	Bangalore							
23	1968	Madras							
24	1970	Cuttack							
25	1979	Hyderabad							
National Games (Summer Olympics format)
26	1985	New Delhi	19 November	26 November	26		21		Maharashtra
27	1987	Cannanore, Calicut, Trichur, Cochin, Quilon, Aleppey	20 December	28 December	22			6400	Kerala
28	1994	Bombay, Pune	16 January	25 January	27	290	28		Maharashtra
29	1997	Bangalore, Mysore	31 May	11 June	26			5245	Karnataka
30	1999	Imphal	14 February	25 February	27		30	6278	Manipur
31	2001	Ludhiana, Patiala, Jalandhar, Chandigarh, Anandpur Sahib, Mohali	19 November	1 December	27			8000	Punjab
32	2002	Hyderabad, Secunderabad, Visakhapatnam	13 December	22 December	30		34	5,887	Andhra Pradesh
33	2007	Guwahati	9 February	18 February	32	425	33	10,945	Services
34	2011	Ranchi, Jamshedpur, Dhanbad	12 February	26 February	33	444	36	8,511	Services
35	2015	Thiruvananthapuram, Kollam, Alappuzha, Kochi, Kozhikode, Thrissur, Kannur	31 January	14 February	33	404	37	7,744	Services
36	2022	Ahmedabad, Gandhinagar, Surat, Vadodara, Rajkot, Bhavnagar	20 September	10 October	36	382	37	7,000	Services
37	2023	Mapusa, Panaji, Ponda, Vasco da Gama, Margao, and New Delhi	25 October	9 November	43	555	37	10,000+	Maharashtra
38	2025	Dehradun, Haridwar, Shivpuri, New Tehri, Nainital, Haldwani, Rudrapur	28 January	14 February	35	441	37	11,354	Services
39	2027	Meghalaya	February	March	TBC	TBC	TBC	TBC	
40	2029	Pondicherry, Chennai and Bhubaneswar	TBA	TBA					

=== Winter ===
List of National Winter Games of India
Competition name	Number	Year	Venue
National Winter Games	1	1996	Gulmarg
National Winter Games	2	2000	Manali
National Winter Games	3	2002	Auli
National Winter Games	4	2004	Gulmarg
National Winter Games	5	2008	Gulmarg

=== Beach ===
List of National Beach Games of India
Competition name	Number	Year	Venue
Beach Games	1	2024	Diu

=== List of Winners ===
Year	Host	1st Position	2nd Position	3rd Position
2002	Andhra Pradesh	Andhra Pradesh	Punjab	Services
2007	Assam	Services	Manipur	Assam
2011	Jharkhand	Services	Manipur	Haryana
2015	Kerala	Services	Kerala	Haryana
2022	Gujarat	Services	Maharashtra	Haryana
2023	Goa	Maharashtra	Services	Haryana
2025	Uttarakhand	Services	Maharashtra	Haryana

== Performance of host states ==
In recent times, the host states of National Games have consistently featured in the top 5 in the overall medal tally. Kerala had become the Champions when it hosted the event in 1987. The 1997 National Games was hosted by Karnataka and they won the largest number of medals. Manipur which had finished 9th in the 1997 National Games, became the overall champions when they hosted the event two years later. In 2001, hosts Punjab became the champions. Andhra Pradesh which had won only 11 Gold Medals in 2001 went on to become the Champions when they hosted it in 2002 winning a whopping 94 Gold Medals overall. Assam had managed to win only a single gold medal and had finished 21st position in 2001. But, in the subsequent 2007 National Games that they hosted, they were the second runners-up winning a total of 38 Gold Medals. In 2011, Assam finished 15th overall winning only 5 Gold Medals. Jharkhand had been in the 15th position in 2007 National Games. They rose to the 5th position when they hosted it in 2011. In 2015, hosts Kerala secured the second spot in the medal tally. One main reason for this trend is the higher number of participants from the host state and comparatively lesser number of participants from other states.

== Future development ==
Though National Games are supposed to be held once in 2 years, it is faltering on this schedule. It took Ahmedabad seven years to conduct the games after 2015 edition in Kerala.

The 34th National Games had been postponed six times before finally opening on 12 February 2011. The 35th National Games were to be held at Thiruvananthapuram in 2012, it was then announced that it would be held from 31 January to 14 February 2015. The 36th National Games were to be held at Goa as announced at the closing ceremony of 35th National Games in Thiruvananthapuram, Goa contingent said the games would be held in November 2016, then it was postponed to November 2017, however Goa has now declared it inability to host the games altogether. Uttarakhand was to host the 37th National Games. The 38th National Games were to be held after that in January 2019 in Amaravati, Andhra Pradesh.

The 36th edition of the National Games was held in the year 2022 in the state of Gujarat.

== Greening the National Games ==
The 2015 National Games organised in Thiruvananthapuram were associated with green protocols. This was initiated by Suchitwa Mission that aimed for "zero-waste" venues. Waste Management programmes were implemented at the 29 venues. To make the event "disposable-free", there was ban on the usage of disposable water bottles. The event witnessed the usage of reusable tableware and stainless steel tumblers. Athletes were provided with refillable steel flasks. It is estimated that these green practices stopped the generation of 120 metric tonnes of disposable waste. Suchitwa Mission requested the help of volunteers to achieve the green objectives, and the service of these 700 volunteers were applauded by the Chief Minister.

== See also ==
- Sport in India
- Khelo India
- Khelo India Youth Games
- Khelo India Winter Games
- Khelo India Para Games
- Khelo India University Games
- Sukma Games
