= Shooting at the 2003 Afro-Asian Games =

Results

25 M Rapid Fire Pistol (Men)

Back No.	Name	Country	Competition Series Scores		Final Stage Scores	Total	Rank
Squad No.	Squad No.	Squad No.	1	2	1	Squad No.	Squad No.
29	Lee Sang-hak	Korea	291	289	97.3	677.3	1
30	Ji Haiping	China	291	290	90.6	671.6	2
28	Liu Guohui	China	291	293	86.7	670.7	3
31	Ronak Pandit	India	281	287	97.7	665.7	4
32	Allan Mcdonald	South Africa	286	288	91.4	665.4	5
34	Mahmoud Abdel Aly	Egypt	283	286	95.9	664.9	6
25	Frederik Willem Van Tonder	South Africa	276	280	0	562.0	7
33	El Sayed Mohamed	Egypt	281	281	0	556.0	8

10 M Air Pistol (Women)

Back No.	Name	Country	Competition Series Scores				Final Series Scores	Total	Rank
Squad No.	Squad No.	Squad No.	1	2	3	4	1	Squad No.	Squad No.
84	Chen Ying	China	97.0	94.0	99.0	98.0	98.9	486.9	1
86	Juliya Bondereva	Kazakhstan	93.0	96.0	97.0	93.0	97.2	476.2	2
85	Gundegmaa Otryad	Mongolia	95.0	95.0	92.0	96.0	96.7	474.7	3
87	Anisa Syed	India	94.0	89.0	97.0	89.0	96.8	465.8	4
88	Nermin Sherif	Egypt	92.0	89.0	94.0	93.0	91.2	459.2	5
91	Mai Ibrahim Mohammed	Egypt	89.0	92.0	95.0	89.0	91.9	456.9	6
89	Ayachi Hanene	Tunisia	0.0	0.0	0.0	0.0	0.0	-	-
90	Hommomi Aydo	Tunisia	0.0	0.0	0.0	0.0	0.0	-	-

50 M Sport Rifle 3 Positions (Men)

Back No.	Name	Country	Competition Series Scores			Final Series Scores	Total	Rank
Squad No.	Squad No.	Squad No.	1	2	3	1	Squad No.	Squad No.
11	Qiu Jian	China	391	384	393	99.6	1267.6	1
10	Vyacheslav Skormnov	Uzbekistan	397	384	383	95.7	1259.7	2
9	Nam Hyung Jin	Korea	393	372	382	94.2	1241.2	3
13	Daniel Gideon Jacobu Henn	South Africa	395	371	380	93.2	1239.2	4
12	A P Subbaiah	India	386	381	378	92.6	1237.6	5
7	Mohamed Ameer	Egypt	391	374	376	92.8	1233.8	6
14	Hendrik Jacobs	South Africa	392	347	376	92.7	1207.7	7
15	Martin Senore	South Africa	385	334.0	371	0	1090	8

10 M Air Pistol (Men)

Back No.	Name	Country	Competition Series Scores						Final Series Scores	Total	Rank
Squad No.	Squad No.	Squad No.	1	2	3	4	5	6	1	Squad No.	Squad No.
20	Tan Zongliang	China	99	98	100	99	99	98	100.8	693.8	1
26	Daniel Francois Van Tonder	South Africa	97	95	96	97	97	94	98.4	674.4	2
24	Friedhelm Sack	Namibia	96	95	96	96	96	96	98.1	673.1	3
41	Hamed Loay	Egypt	94	94	97	93	99	96	99.4	672.4	4
21	Valdimir Guchsha	Kazakhstan	96	96	97	96	95	95	97.0	672	5
31	Ronak Pandit	India	94	93	94	94	95	95	97.2	662.2	6
40	Ved Prakash Pilaniya	India	91	93	98	95	94	93	95.3	659.3	7
42	Ben Yahmed Salah	Tunisia	0	0	0	0	0	0	-	0	-

Double Trap (Men)

Back No.	Name	Country	Competition Series Scores			Final Series Scores	Total	Rank
Squad No.	Squad No.	Squad No.	1	2	3	1	Squad No.	Squad No.
51	Rajyavardhan Rathore	India	44	44	42	44	174	1
53	Ronjan Sodhi Sodhi	India	40	39	44	44	167	2
56	Michael Nicholson	Zimbabwe	44	39	41	38	162	3
52	Moraad Ali Khan	India	34	35	42	42	153	4
58	Nicolaas Jacob Swart	South Africa	33	36	41	35	145	5
54	Dil Bahadur Thapa	India	25	33	36	40	134	6

50 M Sport Rifle 3 Positions (Women)

Back No.	Name	Country	Competition Series Scores			Final Series Scores	Total	Rank
Squad No.	Squad No.	Squad No.	1	2	3	1	Squad No.	Squad No.
70	Anjali Bhagwat	India	196	194	187	98.5	675.5	1
75	Olga Dovgun	Kazakhstan	198	185	196	96.3	675.3	2
77	Kumeli Gangulee	India	195	190	187	97.7	669.7	3
76	Kong Hyun Ah	Korea	197	187	191	93.3	668.3	4
79	Esmari Van Reenen	South Africa	196	178	186	87	647	5
78	Jaquelie Bartileman	South Africa	190	173	181	90	634	6
80	Chantelle Fuller	South Africa	196	148	171	-	515	-

50 M Sport Rifle 3 Positions (Men)

Back No.	Name	Country	Competition Series Scores			Final Series Scores	Total	Rank
Squad No.	Squad No.	Squad No.	1	2	3	1	Squad No.	Squad No.
11	Qiu Jian	China	391	384	393	99.6	1267.6	1
10	Vyacheslav Skormnov	Uzbekistan	397	384	383	95.7	1259.7	2
9	Nam Hyung Jin	Korea	393	372	382	94.2	1241.2	3
13	Daniel Gideon Jacobu Henn	South Africa	395	371	380	93.2	1239.2	4
12	A P Subbaiah	India	386	381	378	92.6	1237.6	5
7	Mohamed Ameer	Egypt	391	374	376	92.8	1233.8	6
14	Hendrik Jacobs	South Africa	392	347	376	92.7	1207.7	7
15	Martin Senore	South Africa	385	334.0	371	0	1090	8

50 M Free Rifle Prone (Men)

Back No.	Name	Country	Competition Series Scores						Final Series Scores	Total	Rank
Squad No.	Squad No.	Squad No.	1	2	3	4	5	6	1	Squad No.	Squad No.
18	T C Palangappa	India	97	96	97	99	98	98	101.4	686.4	8
17	Wang Weiyi	China	98	98	99	97	98	99	104.1	694.1	2
9	Nam Hyung Jin	Korea	98	99	99	99	97	99	100.2	691.2	6
14	Hendrik Jacobs	South Africa	95	97	97	99	99	99	103.1	689.1	7
16	Sergey Relyayev	Kazakhstan	99	97	98	98	99	99	103.3	693.3	4
15	Martin Senore	South Africa	99	99	98	98	97	97	104.4	692.4	5
13	Daniel Gideon Jacobu Henn	South Africa	99	97	99	100	99	98	102.63	694.3	1
19	Fredrick Sebastiano Senore	South Africa	98	98	98	99	98	100	102.4	693.4	3

Trap (Men)

Squad No.	Back No.	Name	Country	Competition Stage Scores					Final Stage Scores	Total	Rank
Squad No.	Squad No.	Squad No.		1	2	3	4	5	1	Squad No.	Squad No.
1	46	Anwer Sultan	India	25	22	22	23	25	24	141	2
2	43	Li Hui	China	24	22	24	25	22	24	141	1
2	49	David Roy Cohen	South Africa	21	23	19	25	21	-	104	6
1	44	Zoravar Singh Sandhu	India	21	25	24	24	23	21	138	4
1	47	Sabet Tarek	Egypt	0	0	0	0	0	0	0	0
2	48	Georgios Eleftheriou	South Africa	22	21	24	20	18	13	118	6
2	45	Manavjit Sandhu	India	23	22	24	23	25	24	141	3
1	50	Karim Abdelkader	Egypt	24	20	17	22	24	21	128	5

Skeet (Men)

Squad No.	Back No.	Name	Country	Competition Stage Scores					Final Stage Scores	Total	Rank
Squad No.	Squad No.	Squad No.		1	2	3	4	5	1	Squad No.	Squad No.
1	60	Jin Di	China	25	25	25	24	25	24	148	1
1	59	Masoud Hamad	Qatar	23	25	25	22	24	23	142	2
2	61	Ponomarev Alexey	Kazakhstan	24	23	23	23	24	22	139	3
1	66	Guy Jack	Kenya	23	21	24	23	22	22	135	6
2	63	Amr El Gayar	Egypt	25	21	22	22	22	24	136	4
2	62	Baba Ps Bedi	India	23	22	23	23	23	22	136	Squad No.
1	65	Khaled Sabet	Egypt	22	21	22	22	25	-	112	7
2	64	Hamdy Moustafa	Egypt	0	0	0	0	0	0	0	Squad No.

50 M Free Pistol (Men)

Squad No.	Back No.	Name	Country	Series Scores						Final Scores	Total	Rank
Squad No.	Squad No.	Squad No.		1	2	3	4	5	6	1	Squad No.	Squad No.
1	24	Friedhelm Sack	Namibia	88	88	90	86	93	92	86.5	623.5	5
1	22	Samaresh Jung	India	89	94	93	90	91	91	93.9	641.9	2
1	23	Satenedra Kumar	India	86	82	86	81	92	87	92.8	606.8	7
1	27	Edward Alfred Adam	South Africa	84	77	81	88	80	86	89.7	590.7	8
1	21	Valdimir Guchsha	Kazakhstan	91	88	90	94	81	80	93.5	637.5	4
1	20	Tan Zongliang	China	93	96	92	98	96	96	96.6	667.6	1
1	26	Daniel Francois Van Tonder	South Africa	89	91	87	96	93	91	93.4	640.4	3
1	25	Frederik Willem Van Tonder	South Africa	81	88	86	87	87	90	88.6	607.6	6

== Results ==
=== Rifle ===
Men's 10 Metre Air Rifle

Squad No.	Back No.	Name	Country	Series Scores						Final	Total	Rank
Squad No.	Back No.	Name	Country	1	2	3	4	5	6	Final	Total	Rank
1	3	Gagan Narang	India	97	100	97	99	100	99	103.7	695.7	1st place, gold medalist(s)
1	6	Ragaey Abd Alla	Egypt	97	99	99	98	99	99	103.7	694.7	2nd place, silver medalist(s)
1	5	Mohamed Ismail	Egypt	100	98	98	98	99	100	101	694	3rd place, bronze medalist(s)
1	4	Sandeep Tarte	India	98	100	100	98	99	99	101.9	692.9	4
1	1	Cai Yalin	China	98	97	99	100	97	99	102.3	692.3	5
1	7	Mohamed Ameer	Egypt	96	98	95	99	99	97	103.1	687.1	6
1	8	Theunis Jansen Van Rensbure	South Africa	96	94	98	89	96	95	100.3	668.3	7
1	2	Juri Lomov	Kazakhstan	0	0	0	0	0	0	0	0	8
