= Clara Udofa =

Nigerian tennis player

- Country (sports): Nigeria
- Born: January 31, 1978 (age 48)
- Prize money: $6,240

Singles
- Highest ranking: No. 549 (November 10, 1997)

Doubles
- Highest ranking: No. 511 (August 3, 1998)
Medal record
All-Africa Games
Gold medal – first place	2003 Abuja	Singles
Gold medal – first place	2003 Abuja	Doubles

Clara Udofa (born January 31, 1978) is a Nigerian former professional tennis player.

Udofa, originally from Calabar in Cross River State, trained under the tutelage of Godwin Kienka at his academy in Lagos. She became Nigeria's youngest ever national senior champion in 1992, at the age of 14. On the professional tour she achieved top 600 rankings in both singles and doubles. In 2003 she won the women's singles gold medal at the All-Africa Games, defeating Zimbabwe's Fadzai Mawisire in the final. This was Nigeria's first ever medal in this category and was won in front of home fans in Abuja, Nigeria. She also won a gold medal in the doubles competition.

== ITF finals ==
=== Doubles: 1 (0–1) ===
Result	No.	Date	Tournament	Surface	Partner	Opponents	Score
Loss	1.	Oct 1997	Puerto Vallarta, Mexico	Hard	(Turkey) Gülberk Gültekin	(United States) Erica Adams (United States) Katie Schlukebir	3–6, 4–6
