= Afro-Asian Games =

Sport competition

- Purpose: Multi sport event for nations of the Asian and African continents
- Frequency: Every 4 years
- Inaugurated: 2003 Afro-Asian Games
- Most recent: 2003 Afro-Asian Games

The Afro-Asian Games were the series of inter-continental multi-sport competitions, held between athletes from Asia and Africa. The event was held only once, in 2003. These Games were unique, since excluding the Olympic Games no other multi-sport competition brought athletes from these two continents together for one event. These Games were supposed to be held once every four years. They were jointly supervised by the Olympic Council of Asia (OCA), and the Association of National Olympic Committees of Africa (ANOCA).

The first and so far only Afro-Asian Games witness the participation of Asian and African National Olympic Committees (NOCs), along with a few Commonwealth Games Federation (CGF) nations. The inaugural Afro-Asian Games were held in 2003 in Hyderabad, India.

== Cancellation ==
Algiers, Algeria was "ready" to host the second Afro-Asian Games, scheduled to be held from July to August 2007. However, the Games were indefinitely postponed. The President of the Association of National Olympic Committees of Africa (ANOCA), Lassana Palenfo, said that:

It is impossible for us to host the Afro-Asian Games, as the Asians have failed to line up their gold medalists.

== List of Afro-Asian Games ==
Year	Games	Host Country	Host City	Dates	Nations	Competitors			Sports	Top Ranked Nation
Year	Games	Host Country	Host City	Dates	Nations	Men	Women	Total	Sports	Top Ranked Nation
2003	I	India	Hyderabad	October 24 – November 1	96			2040	8	China
2007	–	Algeria	Algiers	Cancelled						
