= Sri Lanka national cricket team record by opponent (Pre test status) =

The Ceylon national cricket team, later Sri Lanka national cricket team, represents Sri Lanka in international cricket since its first international representative match in 1927. Before Sri Lanka became a full member of the International Cricket Council (ICC) with Test and One Day International (ODI) status on 21 July 1981, Sri Lanka had associate member status from 1965 to 1981. From 1927 to 1981 all top-level international matches were of first-class or List A status. Sri Lanka first competed in top-level international cricket in 1975, when they played against West Indies during 1975 Cricket World Cup.

== Key ==
- M – Number of matches played
- W – Number of matches won
- L – Number of matches lost
- T – Number of matches tied
- D – Number of matches ended in a draw
- NR – Number of matches ended with no result
- Tie+W – Number of matches tied and then won in a tiebreaker such as a bowl-out or Super Over
- Tie+L – Number of matches tied and then lost in a tiebreaker such as a bowl-out or Super Over
- Win% – Percentage of games won to those played (Note: Games that did not have a result are not taken into consideration while calculating the result percentage. Ties are counted as half a win.)
- Loss% – Percentage of games lost to those played
- Draw% – Percentage of games drawn to those played
- First – Year of the first match played by Sri Lanka against the team
- Last – Year of the last match played by Sri Lanka against the team

== First-class cricket ==
=== First-class record ===
Team	Opponent	1st Match	Last match	Matches	Won	Lost	Drawn	Tied	% Won
Sri Lanka	Australia	25 October 1935	7 May 1981	3	0	1	2	0	0
Sri Lanka	India	18 December 1932	28 November 1975	13	1	5	7	0	7.69
Sri Lanka	Pakistan	1 April 1949	24 January 1976	12	1	9	2	0	8.33
Sri Lanka	West Indies	19 February 1949	22 February 1979	6	0	2	4	0	0
Sri Lanka	Andhra Chief Minister's XI	16 January 1971		1	1	0	0	0	100
Sri Lanka	Australian Services	14 December 1945		1	0	1	0	0	0
Sri Lanka	Bombay	8 January 1965		1	0	0	1	0	0
Sri Lanka	Central Provinces and Berar	4 January 1933		1	1	0	0	0	100
Sri Lanka	Commander-in-Chief's XI	31 March 1950		1	0	0	1	0	0
Sri Lanka	Commonwealth XI	25 February 1950	16 February 1951	2	0	1	1	0	0
Sri Lanka	Hyderabad	29 October 1955		1	0	0	1	0	0
Sri Lanka	Indian Board President's XI	29 December 1964		1	0	1	0	0	0
Sri Lanka	Indian Universities	5 December 1964		1	0	0	1	0	0
Sri Lanka	Indian University Occasionals	3 October 1935		1	0	0	1	0	0
Sri Lanka	Indian XI	26 December 1940	31 December 1940	2	0	1	1	0	0
Sri Lanka	Karachi and Sind	18 March 1950		1	0	1	0	0	0
Sri Lanka	Kerala	8 January 1971		1	1	0	0	0	100
Sri Lanka	Kerala Chief Minister's XI	16 March 1973		1	1	0	0	0	100
Sri Lanka	Madras Cricket Association President's XI	8 March 1969		1	0	0	1	0	0
Sri Lanka	Maharashtra	24 December 1964		1	0	0	1	0	0
Sri Lanka	Marylebone Cricket Club	5 February 1927	25 February 1977	8	0	6	2	0	0
Sri Lanka	North West Frontier Province Governor's XI	26 March 1974		1	0	0	1	0	0
Sri Lanka	Mysore	21 March 1958		1	0	0	1	0	0
Sri Lanka	Pakistan A	28 August 1964		1	1	0	0	0	100
Sri Lanka	Pakistan under-19	7 April 1974		1	0	0	1	0	0
Sri Lanka	Pakistan Universities	7 April 1950	30 March 1974	2	0	0	2	0	0
Sri Lanka	Patiala	24 December 1932		1	1	0	0	0	100
Sri Lanka	President's XI	4 November 1966		1	0	0	1	0	0
Sri Lanka	Punjab	16 March 1974		1	0	0	1	0	0
Sri Lanka	Punjab Governor's XI	8 November 1966		1	0	0	1	0	0
Sri Lanka	Railways	3 April 1974		1	1	0	0	0	100
Sri Lanka	Sind	13 December 1932	10 March 1974	2	1	0	1	0	50
Sri Lanka	Sir Julien Cahn's XI	18 March 1937		1	0	1	0	0	0
Sri Lanka	Tamil Nadu	8 January 1933	1 April 1977	14	4	5	5	0	25.57
Sri Lanka	Total			88	14	34	40	0	15.91

=== List of matches ===
First-class matches played by Ceylon/Sri Lanka to 1981
Season	Opponent	Venue	Played	Won	Lost	Drawn
First-class matches
1926–27	Marylebone Cricket Club	Viharamahadevi Park, Colombo	1		1	
1932–33	Sind	Karachi Gymkhana Ground, Karachi	1			1
1932–33	India	Lawrence Gardens, Lahore; Feroz Shah Kotla, Delhi	2			2
1932–33	Patiala	Baradari Ground, Patiala	1	1		
1932–33	Central Provinces and Berar	Central Provinces Gymkhana Ground, Nagpur	1	1		
1932–33	Madras	Madras Cricket Club Ground, Madras	1		1	
1933–34	Marylebone Cricket Club	Colombo Cricket Club Ground, Colombo	1		1	
1935–36	Indian University Occasionals	Viharamahadevi Park, Colombo	1			1
1935–36	Australians	Viharamahadevi Park, Colombo	1			1
1936–37	Sir Julien Cahn's XI	Viharamahadevi Park, Colombo	1		1	
1940–41	Madras	Madras Cricket Club Ground, Madras	1	1		
1940–41	Indian XI	Eden Gardens, Calcutta	1			1
1940–41	Indian XI	Brabourne Stadium, Bombay	1		1	
1944–45	India	Colombo Oval, Colombo	1			1
1945–46	Australian Services	Colombo Oval, Colombo	1		1	
1948–49	West Indians	Colombo Oval, Colombo	2		1	1
1948–49	Pakistan	Colombo Oval, Colombo	2		2	
1949–50	Commonwealth XI	Colombo Oval, Colombo	1		1	
1949–50	Karachi and Sind	Karachi Gymkhana Ground, Karachi	1		1	
1949–50	Pakistan	Bagh-e-Jinnah, Lahore; Karachi Gymkhana Ground, Karachi	2		2	
1949–50	Commander-in-Chief's XI	Pindi Club Ground, Rawalpindi	1			1
1949–50	Pakistan Universities	Punjab University Ground, Lahore	1			1
1950–51	Commonwealth XI	Colombo Oval, Colombo	1			1
1951–52	Marylebone Cricket Club	Colombo Oval, Colombo	1		1	
1952–53	Madras	Madras Cricket Club Ground, Madras; Nehru Stadium, Madras	2	2		
1955–56	Hyderabad cricket team	Lal Bahadur Shastri Stadium, Hyderabad	1			1
1956–57	India	Colombo Oval, Colombo	2			2
1957–58	Madras	Madras Cricket Club Ground, Madras	1		1	
1957–58	Mysore	Central College Ground, Bangalore	1			1
1959–60	Madras	Nehru Stadium, Madras	1		1	
1961–62	Madras	Nehru Stadium, Madras	1	1		
1961–62	Marylebone Cricket Club	Colombo Oval, Colombo	1		1	
1964–65	Pakistan A	Colombo Oval, Colombo	1	1		
1964–65	Indian Universities	Nehru Stadium, Madras	1			1
1964–65	India	Central College Ground, Bangalore; Lal Bahadur Shastri Stadium, Hyderabad; Sardar Vallabhbhai Patel Stadium, Ahmedabad	3	1	2	
1964–65	Maharashtra	Club of Maharashtra, Poona	1			1
1964–65	Indian Board President's XI	Moti Bagh Stadium, Baroda	1		1	
1964–65	Bombay	Brabourne Stadium, Bombay	1			1
1964–65	Madras	Nehru Stadium, Madras	1			1
1966–67	President's XI	Pindi Club Ground, Rawalpindi	1			1
1966–67	Punjab Governor's XI	Lyallpur Stadium, Lyallpur	1			1
1966–67	Pakistan	Gaddafi Stadium, Lahore; Dacca Stadium, Dacca; National Stadium, Karachi	3		3	
1966–67	West Indies	Colombo Oval, Colombo	1		1	
1966–67	Madras	Madras Cricket Club Ground, Madras	1			1
1968–69	Marylebone Cricket Club	Colombo Oval, Colombo	1			1
1968–69	Madras Cricket Association President's XI	Kajamalai Stadium, Tiruchirapalli	1			1
1968–69	Madras	Madras Cricket Club Ground, Madras	1			1
1969–70	Australians	Colombo Oval, Colombo	1			1
1969–70	Marylebone Cricket Club	Colombo Oval, Colombo	1		1	
1970–71	Kerala	University Stadium, Trivandrum	1	1		
1970–71	Andhra Chief Minister's XI	Brahmananda Reddy Stadium, Guntur	1	1		
1970–71	Tamil Nadu	Madras Cricket Club Ground, Madras	1			1
1972–73	Pakistan	Colombo Oval, Colombo	1			1
1972–73	Marylebone Cricket Club	Colombo Oval, Colombo	1		1	
1972–73	Kerala Chief Minister's XI	University Stadium, Trivandrum	1	1		
1972–73	Tamil Nadu	Madras Cricket Club Ground, Madras	1		1	
1973–74	India	Colombo Oval, Colombo; Sinhalese Sports Club Ground, Colombo	2		1	1
1973–74	Sind	Gama Stadium, Mirpurkhas	1	1		
1973–74	Punjab	Lyallpur Stadium, Lyallpur	1			1
1973–74	Pakistan	Gaddafi Stadium, Lahore; National Stadium, Karachi	2		1	1
1973–74	North West Frontier Province Governor's XI	Peshawar Club Ground, Peshawar	1			1
1973–74	Pakistan Universities	Pindi Club Ground, Rawalpindi	1			1
1973–74	Railways	Zafar Ali Stadium, Sahiwal	1	1		
1973–74	Pakistan national under-19	Ibn-e-Qasim Bagh Stadium, Multan	1			1
1974–75	West Indians	Colombo Cricket Club Ground, Colombo; Colombo Oval, Colombo	2			2
1974–75	Tamil Nadu	Mahatma Gandhi Stadium, Salem	1		1	
1975–76	India	Lal Bahadur Shastri Stadium, Hyderabad; Sardar Vallabhbhai Patel Stadium, Ahmedabad; Vidarbha Cricket Association Ground, Nagpur	3		2	1
1975–76	Pakistan	Colombo Cricket Club Ground, Colombo	2	1	1	
1976–77	Marylebone Cricket Club	Paikiasothy Saravanamuttu Stadium, Colombo	1			1
1976–77	Tamil Nadu	Madras Cricket Club Ground, Madras	1			1
1978–79	West Indies	Paikiasothy Saravanamuttu Stadium, Colombo	1			1
1981	Australia	Paikiasothy Saravanamuttu Stadium, Colombo	1			1
Totals			88	14	34	41
Other International matches
1926	Australians	Colombo Cricket Club Ground, Colombo	1		1	
1927	New Zealanders	Colombo	1			1
1930	Australians	Colombo Cricket Club Ground, Colombo	1			1
1934	Australians	Nondescripts Cricket Club Ground, Colombo	1			1
1937–38	New Zealanders	Colombo	1			1
1938	Australians	Viharamahadevi Park, Colombo	1			1
1948	Australians	Colombo Cricket Club Ground, Colombo	1			1
1953	Australians	Colombo Oval, Colombo	1			1
1957	Singapore	The Padang, Singapore	1			1
1957	Malaya	The Padang, Kuala Lumpur	1	1		
1961	Australians	Colombo Oval, Colombo	1			1
1964	Australians	Colombo Oval, Colombo	1			1
Totals			12	1	1	10
