= Tara Bolling =

Sri Lankan swimmer (1941–2017)

- Born: Tara De Saram; 22 January 1941; Dominion of Ceylon
- Died: 2 August 2017 (aged 76); Kollupitiya, Colombo, Western Province, Sri Lanka
- Resting place: Borella, Colombo
- Citizenship: Sri Lankan
- Education: Bishop's College
- Occupations: swimmer, coach
- Spouse: Ralph Bolling
- Children: 3 sons (Julian) (David) (Jeremy)
- Relatives: Fredrick de Saram (father); Neil Chanmugam (cousin); Dennis Chanmugam (cousin); Dipika Chanmugam (niece)

Tara Bolling (22 January 1941 – 2 August 2017) was a Sri Lankan swimmer and a former swimming coach. Bolling was regarded as one of the prominent female competitive swimmers in Sri Lanka. She represented Sri Lanka in both Commonwealth Games and Asian Games.

== Biography ==
Bolling was born in her family as the eldest child and she had three siblings including two sisters and a brother. Her father Fredrick de Saram was a lawyer and a former first-class cricketer and infamous for having led the attempted military coup of 1962. Frederick was regarded as one of Ceylon's finest batters in first-class cricket during the pre-test arena of Ceylon (present day Sri Lanka), when Ceylon was only playing unofficial test matches. Her mother Nedra Obeyesekere was a tennis player who was also a one-time winner of the national tennis championship in singles category. Her sister Oosha de Saram was also a swimmer and a tennis player who was married to Ceylonese cricketer Neil Chanmugam.

She pursued her primary and secondary education at Bishop's College. She married swimmer Ralph Bolling who also played school cricket for St. Joseph's College, Colombo and the couple had three sons. Her sons Julian Bolling, Jeremy Bolling and David Bolling were also competitive swimmers.

== Career ==
She obtained swimming coaching at an early age in Australia, where she met former Australin Olympic swimming coach Harry Nightingale. She represented Ceylon at the 1958 British Empire and Commonwealth Games in the women's 400 metres freestyle swimming competition. She also represented Ceylon at the 1958 Asian Games in the women's 400m freestyle swimming event and finished the event placing at fourth position. She also competed in 400m freestyle events in India. She excelled in the national swimming competitions in Sri Lanka during the 1950s and 1960s.

After her retirement from competitive swimming, she became the coach of Sri Lankan national swimming team. She also coached her son Julian Bolling who later went onto become a successful swimmer at national and international events. She also coached her niece Dipika Chanmugam who was also a national swimmer.

In 1988, Bolling collaborated with her husband Ralph and along with her second son David to establish the Rainbow Swimming and Aquatic Club.

== Death ==
She died on 2 August 2017 at the age of 76. During the time of her death, she was residing in Kollupitiya. The funeral was held on 4 August 2017 at the General Cemetery in Borella.
