= Chanmugam =

Chanmugam is a surname. Notable people with the surname include:

- Dennis Chanmugam (born 1948), Sri Lankan cricketer
- Dipika Chanmugam (born 1972), Sri Lankan swimmer
- Ganesar Chanmugam (1939–1996), Sri Lankan astrophysicist
- J. C. Chanmugam, Surveyor General of Sri Lanka
- Neil Chanmugam (1940–2014), Sri Lankan cricketer

== See also ==
- 16107 Chanmugam, minor planet
