= Accommodation for the 2003 Afro-Asian Games =

Accommodation for the athletes, foreign officials, dignitaries and media personnel attending the 2003 Afro-Asian Games, held in Hyderabad, India, was a major point of difference between these Games and other multi-sport events. Unlike in other major events such as the Olympic Games or the Asian Games, there was no separate "Games Village" as such for providing accommodation. This posed a serious problem to the organisers.

== Reason and solution ==
The Sports Authority of Andhra Pradesh (SAAP) had initially wanted to have a separate Games Village for the Games, but could not arrange for it. Even though Hyderabad had hosted the 32nd National Games of India in 2002, for which a Games Village had been built, the organizers could not utilise it due to severe financial problems. It was estimated that about Rs 800 million (US$16 million) would be required to upgrade the existing Games Village. The Government of Andhra Pradesh and the Sports Authority of Andhra Pradesh (SAAP) instead opted to obtain bulk bookings from all the major hotels in the city so as to provide accommodation for the athletes, foreign dignitaries and the media.

== Hotels ==
Main source: The Hindu

The total requirement for accommodation was around 4,500. This included various groups of people such as the media, the visiting officers, foreign dignitaries, athletes and coaches etc. These groups of people had to be allotted various hotels in the city.

To ease the process of allotment, the people to be accommodated were divided into four broad groups:-

=== Category - 1 ===
This category comprised foreign ministers who were visiting the city to observe the Games, members of the African and Asian committees and certain other representatives. The number of people under this category came to about 550.

These people were accommodated in several five-star hotels including the Taj Krishna, ITC Grand Kakatiya and Hotel Sitara.

=== Category - 2 ===
This category comprises all the athletes and non-competing participants (i.e., extras), coaches and team managers. This category comprises the largest chunk of accommodees, numbering to about 2,040. Since this category is itself a "mixed bunch", it was further divided according to the participant's sport. Each sport's participants were accommodated in different hotels, hostels and inns. The list of hotels utilized for this purpose is given below:-

Hotel	Sport
Amrutha Castle	Boxing
Green Park	Football
Indian School of Business	Field Hockey (men)
Hotel Golconda	Field Hockey (women)
Fortune Katriya	Shooting
Aditya Park, Hotel Basera	Swimming (Asia)
Hotel Regency, Hotel Belsons Taj Mahal, Kamat Lingapur	Swimming (Africa)
Quality Inn	Tennis
Central Court	Weightlifting (men)
Taj Tristar	Weightlifting (women)
Hotel Manohar	Other Asian athletes
Hotel Viceroy	Other African athletes

=== Category - 3 ===
This category comprises technicians, technical operators, overseers, etc., who had come to supervise the functioning of the technical infrastructure put into place for broadcasting, scores, etc. These people were accommodated in a number of hotels, guest houses, institutes and inns.

=== Category - 4 ===
This category comprises the entire media - newspaper reporters, television reporters, cameramen, their assistants, etc., as well as people from the foreign media who were coming to give exclusive coverage of the Games outside India. These people were accommodated in the Whisper Valley apartments in the posh Jubilee Hills area.

== Problems ==
The plan of mass hotel bookings, which is a new concept, met with a great deal of problems and criticism. Before the beginning of the Games, the problems were so acute that many people thought that the room shortage would be very large.

=== Athlete objections ===
The allocation of hotels to the athletes was received with a mixed response, with objections from several contingents participating in the Games. The boxing athletes reportedly said that it was "beneath their dignity" to be accommodated in Amrutha Castle. Similarly, the swimming officials plainly refused to stay in Hotel Asrani International.

=== Availability ===
The availability of rooms for the Games was one of the more serious problems affecting the accommodation authorities. In spite of the fact that the Government of Andhra Pradesh had given strict orders to all hotel managements in the city to not accept bookings from anyone else during the period of the Games, the number of rooms required was still not satisfied.

=== Other problems ===
The firm in-charge of conducting the opening and closing ceremonies of the Games made a demand of 500 rooms to be booked only five-star hotels "and nothing else". Besides, the hotel managements contracted to provide the accommodation facilities threatened to withdraw the facilities if the promised 50% advance was not paid on time.

== See also ==
- Afro-Asian Games
- 2003 Afro-Asian Games
- Tourism in Andhra Pradesh
