= Julian Bolling =

Sri Lankan swimmer

Personal information
- Full name: Julian Bolling
- National team: Sri Lanka
- Born: 19 June 1966 Colombo, Sri Lanka
- Height: 5 ft 9 in (175 cm)
- Weight: 70 kg (154 lb)

Sport
- Sport: Swimming
- Strokes: Freestyle Butterfly
- Club: bolling swimming academy
- Coach: Tara Bolling
Medal record
Men's swimming
Representing Sri Lanka
South Asian Games
Gold medal – first place	1991 Colombo	200 m freestyle
Gold medal – first place	1991 Colombo	400 m freestyle
Gold medal – first place	1991 Colombo	1500 m freestyle
Gold medal – first place	1991 Colombo	200 m butterfly
Gold medal – first place	1991 Colombo	400 m individual medley

Deshabandu Julian Bolling (born 19 June 1966) is a Sri Lankan medal-winning swimmer who represented his country at numerous international competitions. He is fondly remembered as the poster boy of Sri Lankan swimming in the 1980s. He won 15 gold medals for Sri Lanka at the South Asian Games between 1984 and 1991. He also represented Sri Lanka at three Olympic Games, firstly at Los Angeles (USA) in 1984, then at Seoul (South Korea) in 1988, and finally at Barcelona (Spain) in 1992. He was the first Sri Lankan to participate in three consecutive Olympics (1984, 1988 and 1992).

== Biography ==
He is the son of Tara Bolling and cousin of Dipika Chanmugam, both of whom have represented Sri Lanka internationally. His mother and coach Tara Bolling née De Saram was a standout swimmer in the latter half of the 1960s represented Ceylon at the Tokyo Olympics. He was coached by his mother from 1982. His grandfather Fredrick de Saram was a cricketer and infamous for having led the attempted military coup of 1962.

== Career ==
He took up swimming while pursuing his education at Royal College and he first took part in an age group meet in India in 1979 which was his first major international exposure. He proved his mettle and stamped his authority with his two elder brothers Jeromy Bolling and David Bolling in the 1979 Indo-Sri Lankan-Bangladesh Swimming Triangular Meet. At Royal College, he was coached by G. A. Wilson from 1977 to 1982.

He made his Asian Games debut during the 1982 Asian Games and gained sixth-place finishes in both men's 400m and 1500m freestyle events while securing a seventh-place finish in the men's 400m individual medley event. He also competed at the 1986 Asian Games. He graduated from the University of California and with a marketing degree from the Clarion University in the US when he was on a scholarship in the USA. He returned to Sri Lanka in 1992 and worked in American Express Bank for a brief stint before switching to Nestles.

Bolling's best performance at an international meet was at the Colombo South Asian Games where he won six gold medals. He was dubbed as South Asia's best swimmer following his medal galore at 1991 South Asian Games. Bolling claimed gold medals in men's 200 m freestyle, 400m freestyle, 1500m freestyle, 200m butterfly, 4 × 200 m freestyle relay and 400m individual medley events during the 1991 South Asian Federation Games.

It was revealed that he wanted to quit swimming altogether just two weeks prior to the 1991 South Asian Games, the event later turned out to be a great comeback for him personally amid all odds. He felt he had not enjoyed the sport due to undue pressure on him according to the level of expectations that the country had on him to win medals. His mother Tara managed to convince him to pursue the sport of swimming by giving him confidence. He also took water polo as a side hustle and competed in a water polo event held in Kolkata in November 1992 just after returning from Barcelona following the conclusion of the Summer Olympics. He also took part in an Asian waterpolo tournament in Thailand.

His record for most gold medals in a single South Asian Games event was unbeaten until 2016 when Matthew Abeysinghe broke the record by winning seven golds in India.

Bolling was honoured in 1988 by being awarded the Deshabandu, which is the third-highest national honour awarded in Sri Lanka. He worked as a coach of Rainbow Aquatic Club and was also appointed as a member of the National Sports Council. In January 2022, he was elected as one of the committee members of the Sri Lanka Olympians.

== Activism ==
In June 2022, he along with Transparency International Sri Lanka filed petition in the Supreme Court calling for stern action against 13 individuals claiming to be directly responsible for the economic crisis in Sri Lanka.

On 17 August 2022, he was summoned to the Criminal Investigation Department (Sri Lanka) in order to record statements regarding his involvement in mass anti-government protests on 9 July 2022.
