= Ceylonese cricket team in Pakistan in 1949–50 =

International cricket tour

The Ceylon cricket team toured Pakistan in March and April 1950. Ceylon did not then have Test status, but two four-day unofficial Tests were played, Pakistan winning both by large margins. The tour also included three other first-class matches and a minor match.

== The Ceylon team ==
- Sargo Jayawickreme (captain)
- Jack Burton
- Satyendra Coomaraswamy
- Fairlie Dalphatado
- Lucien de Zoysa
- Cadiravel Dharmalingam
- Irwin Fernando
- Gamini Goonesena
- Stanley Jayasinghe
- Ernie Kelaart
- Ben Navaratne
- Mahesh Rodrigo
- Makkin Salih
- Mahadevan Sathasivam
- Bertie Wijesinha

Jayawickreme and Navaratne were the only members of the party that had taken part in Ceylon's previous tour, to India in 1940–41. All but Burton, Dharmalingam and Fernando played in the two unofficial Tests.

== The Pakistan team ==
- Mohammed Saeed (captain)
- Nazar Mohammad
- Imtiaz Ahmed
- Rusi Dinshaw
- Maqsood Ahmed
- Inayat Khan
- Syed Asghar Ali
- Fazal Mahmood
- Khan Mohammad
- Usuf Chippa
- Khalid Qureshi
- Alimuddin
- Anwar Hussain
- Waqar Hasan

== The tour ==
- Karachi and Sind v Ceylon, Karachi Gymkhana, Karachi, 18, 19, 20 March 1950. Karachi and Sind 346, Ceylon 135 and 148. Karachi and Sind won by an innings and 63 runs.

Wijesinha's 57 in the second innings was Ceylon's only fifty.

- Pakistan v Ceylon, Bagh-e-Jinnah, Lahore, 25, 26, 27, 28 March 1950. Pakistan 362, Ceylon 166 and 151. Pakistan won by an innings and 45 runs.

This was Pakistan's fourth international match, after one against West Indies and two against Ceylon the previous season. Imtiaz Ahmed, who had scored a century against West Indies, scored 127 here. Sathasivam's 56 in the second innings was Ceylon's only fifty. Goonesena took 4 for 99.

- Commander-in-Chief's XI v Ceylon, Pindi Club Ground, Rawalpindi, 31 March, 1, 2 April 1950. Commander-in-Chief's XI 196 and 43 for 0, Ceylon 100 for 9 declared. Drawn.

Little play was possible after the first day, when de Zoysa took 6 for 65.

- A two-day match against Montgomery Cricket Club at Montgomery Cricket Club Ground in Sahiwal was drawn.
- Pakistan Universities v Ceylon, Punjab University Ground, Lahore, 7, 8, 9 April 1950. Ceylon 329 and 133, Pakistan Universities 188 and 214 for 7. Drawn.

Jayasinghe, batting at number eight, made 125, Ceylon's only century of the tour. He and Kelaart added 114 for the ninth wicket. Wijesinha took 5 for 59 and 2 for 54.

- Pakistan v Ceylon, Karachi Gymkhana, Karachi, 13, 14, 15 April 1950. Ceylon 162 and 149, Pakistan 260 and 55 for no wicket. Pakistan won by 10 wickets.

De Zoysa took 6 for 72 and Jayasinghe made 80 in the first innings. For Pakistan, Fazal Mahmood took 5 for 30 and 3 for 31 and Usuf Chippa took 2 for 33 and 5 for 53.

== Leading players ==
In the two matches against Pakistan, Jayasinghe was the highest scorer with 173 runs at an average of 43.25, and de Zoysa took most wickets, eight at 17.87. In all first-class matches Jayasinghe was the highest scorer, with 333 runs at 37.00 and the only century; de Zoysa took most wickets, 21 at 16.23. Wijesinha made 156 runs at 26.00 and took 12 wickets at 31.00.
