= Bula Choudhury =

Indian swimmer (born 1970)

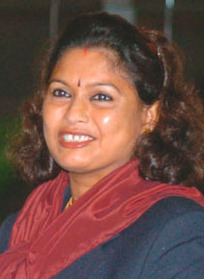
- Choudhury in 2004

Personal information
- National team: India
- Born: 2 January 1970 (age 56) Hugli, West Bengal, India

Sport
- Sport: Swimming
- Strokes: Freestyle, Butterfly
Medal record
Women's swimming
Representing India
South Asian Games
Gold medal – first place	1991 Colombo	50 m freestyle
Gold medal – first place	1991 Colombo	100 m freestyle
Gold medal – first place	1991 Colombo	100 m butterfly
Gold medal – first place	1991 Colombo	200 m butterfly

Bula Choudhury (born 2 January 1970 in Hugli, India) is an Indian former swimmer. She is an Arjuna awardee, Padma Shri awardee, former India national women's swimming champion and elected as MLA from 2006 to 2011 representing Nandanpur in West Bengal state of India.

== Swimming career ==
Her first national competition, at age nine, she dominated her age group by winning six gold medals in six events. She continued to improve, winning various junior and national championships, as well as six gold medals at the 1991 South Asian Federation Games. She went to her first nationals, at the age of 12, which is an all-time record. This also guaranteed her a place in the relay quartet for the Brisbane Commonwealth Games as well as a prominent place on the list of Asiad probables.

In 1984 she set a national 100m butterfly record of 1:06.19 sec. During the Seoul Asian Games in 1986, she created a record of 1:05.27 sec in 100m butterfly and another record of 2:19.60 sec in 200m butterfly. Choudhury started long-distance swimming in 1989 and crossed the English Channel that year. She won the 81-km (50- mile) Murshidabad Long Distance Swim in 1996, and in 1999 she crossed the English Channel again. In August 2004, she set this record by swimming across the Palk Straits from Talaimannar in Sri Lanka to Dhanushkodi in Tamil Nadu in nearly 14 hours.

She became the first woman to have swum across sea channels off five continents in 2005 —including the Strait of Gibraltar, the Tyrrhenian Sea, Cook Strait, Toroneos Gulf (Gulf of Kassándra) in Greece, the Catalina Channel off the California coast, and from Three Anchor Bay to Robben Island near Cape Town, South Africa. She created a record for swimming the 30 km track in 3 hours & 26 minutes. She is now planning to establish a swimming academy in Kolkata.

== Awards and distinctions ==
- First woman to cross seven seas.
- Twice swam the English Channel first in 1989 and again in 1999.
- Arjuna Award in 1990.
- Padma Shri award.
- Tenzing Norgay National Adventure Award 2002

== See also ==
- Swimming in India
- List of Indian records in swimming
- Kutraleeswaran
