= Makkin Salih =

Sri Lankan cricketer

- Makkin Salih in 1947

Personal information
- Full name: Mohamed Makkin Salih
- Born: 1923; Ceylon
- Died: 24 May 2003 (aged 79 or 80); Sri Lanka
- Role: Opening batsman

Career statistics
Competition	First-class
Matches	14
Runs scored	527
Batting average	25.09
100s/50s	0/4
Top score	98
Catches/stumpings	3/–
- Source: Cricinfo, 27 September 2017

Makkin Salih (1923 – 24 May 2003) was a cricketer who played first-class cricket for Ceylon from 1947 to 1955.

An opening batsman for the Moors Sports Club in Colombo, Salih made his first-class debut for Ceylon Cricket Association against Southern India in 1946–47, scoring 98 and sharing century partnerships with Fredrick de Saram and Mahadevan Sathasivam. He toured Pakistan in 1949-50 with the Ceylon team.

Salih set a batting record for the Sara Trophy, Ceylon's leading domestic competition, when he scored 237 for Moors in 1952. The record stood until 1970, when A. C. M. Lafir scored 255 for Nomads Sports Club.

Salih and his wife Sithy Suada (the sister of the Ceylon cricketer Abu Fuard) had four children.
