= Chippy Gunasekara =

Sri Lankan cricketer

Personal information
- Full name: L. D. S. Gunasekara
- Born: 1905; Ceylon
- Died: 8 January 1974 (aged 68 or 69); Sri Lanka
- Nickname: Chippy
- Height: 5 ft 3 in (1.60 m)
- Batting: Left-handed
- Relatives: Churchill Gunasekara (uncle)

Career statistics
Competition	First-class
Matches	11
Runs scored	336
Batting average	25.09
100s/50s	0/2
Top score	67
Catches/stumpings	4/1
- Source: Cricinfo, 28 September 2017

L. D. S. "Chippy" Gunasekara (1905 – 8 January 1974) was a cricketer and lawyer who played first-class cricket for Ceylon from 1929 to 1935.

Although he was only five feet three inches tall and played in spectacles, "Chippy" Gunasekera was a good left-handed opening batsman with a strong defence, and a fine cover fieldsman. He toured India in 1932-33, top-scoring in Ceylon's first-ever first-class victory, in the match against Patiala, when he made 57 in the first innings, the only fifty on either side. He captained Ceylon in the match against the Australians in 1935-36, top-scoring in Ceylon's second innings. In club cricket in Colombo he formed an outstanding opening partnership with Mohotti Albert, and later in his career he became one of Ceylon's best leg-spin bowlers.

Later Gunasekara was one of the leading criminal lawyers in Ceylon. He was also a prominent cricket coach.
