= Edward Kelaart =

Edward Kelaart may refer to:

- Ed Kelaart (1900–1989), Ceylonese cricketer
- Edward Frederick Kelaart (1819–1860), Ceylonese-born physician and naturalist
