= Nisha Millet =

Indian swimmer (born 1982)

Personal information
- National team: India
- Born: 20 March 1982 (age 44) Bangalore, Karnataka, India

Sport
- Sport: Swimming
- Strokes: Freestyle, backstroke
Medal record
Women's swimming
Representing India
South Asian Games
Gold medal – first place	1999 Kathmandu	50 m freestyle
Gold medal – first place	1999 Kathmandu	100 m freestyle
Gold medal – first place	1999 Kathmandu	200 m freestyle
Gold medal – first place	1999 Kathmandu	400 m freestyle
Gold medal – first place	1999 Kathmandu	100 m backstroke
Gold medal – first place	1999 Kathmandu	200 m backstroke

Nisha Millet (born 20 March 1982) is a swimmer from Bengaluru, Karnataka, India. An Arjuna Award winner, she was the only woman in the 2000 Sydney Olympics swim team for India.

== Career ==
Millet had a near-drowning experience at the age of 5 years, following which her father insisted she overcame her fear and learn how to swim. In 1991, Millet learned how to swim under the guidance of her father, Aubrey at Shenoynagar Club, Chennai. By 1992, Millet had won her first state-level medal in 50m freestyle, in Chennai.

Her parents moved to Bangalore to further her swimming training and career. She attended Sophia High School in Bangalore.

In 1994, while still a sub-junior, Millet won all five freestyle gold medals at the Senior National Level and beat India's top swimmers. The same year, she also won her first international medal at the Asian Age Group Championships in Hong Kong.

Millet represented India at the 1998 Asian Games (Thailand), World Championships (Perth 1999, Indianapolis 2004) and won medals for the country at both the Afro-Asian Games and SAF Games. She was the only Indian athlete to win 14 gold medals at the National Games in 1999. At the peak of her career, Millet represented India at the 2000 Sydney Olympics in the 200m freestyle, where she won her heat, but failed to qualify for the semi-finals. She was the first Indian woman to meet the B Qualification timings for the Olympics. After undergoing back surgery in 2002, she narrowly missed out on the 2004 Olympic qualification and decided to retire from competitive swimming due to the heavy financial burden on her parents.

She credits a large part of her success to Pradeep Kumar at the Basavanagudi Aquatic Centre.

Millet held the national record/Best Indian performance in the 200m and 400m freestyle for 15 years, ending in 2015. She also holds the distinction of being the first female Indian swimmer to break the one-minute barrier in the 100m freestyle.

She is also a member of the Bangalore Political Action Committee (B.PAC).

== Awards ==
- Prime Minister's award for best sportswoman of the national games - 1997 and 1999.
- Highest Gold medals (14) in sports in the Manipur National Games - 1999
- Arjuna Award given to highest sports person in India - 2000
- Rajyotsava Award - 2001
- Karnataka State Ekalavya Award - 2002
- Afro-Asian games, women's backstroke Silver medal - 2003

== See also ==
- India at the 2000 Summer Olympics
- Basavanagudi Aquatic Centre
