= Usuf Chippa =

Indian cricketer (1920–1975)

Personal information
- Full name: Usuf Rehman Chippa
- Born: 20 January 1920; Ahmedabad, British India
- Died: 18 November 1975 (aged 55); Karachi, Pakistan
- Batting: Left-handed
- Bowling: Slow left-arm orthodox

Domestic team information
- Years: Team
- 1937–38 to 1947–48: Gujarat
- 1941–42 to 1943–44: Muslims
- 1942–43: Western India
- 1953–54: Karachi

Career statistics
Competition	First-class
Matches	29
Runs scored	260
Batting average	8.38
100s/50s	0/0
Top score	30*
Balls bowled	5620
Wickets	85
Bowling average	25.21
5 wickets in innings	4
10 wickets in match	0
Best bowling	6/45
Catches/stumpings	9/–
- Source: Cricinfo, 22 September 2017

Usuf Rehman Chippa (20 January 1920 – 18 November 1975) was a Pakistani cricketer who played first-class cricket from 1937 to 1955 and represented India and Pakistan, but did not play Test cricket.

A slow left-arm orthodox spin bowler, Usuf Chippa made his first-class debut in 1937–38 at the age of 17 for Gujarat in a Ranji Trophy match against Bombay, taking 5 for 23 in the first innings. In the 1939–40 Ranji Trophy, he took 6 for 45 and 3 for 48 in a match against Baroda. In 1940–41 he represented India in the second of their two matches against the touring Ceylon team, taking 5 for 38 in the first innings of an innings victory for India.

Chippa moved to Pakistan after the partition of India. He toured Ceylon in 1948–49 with the Pakistan team, playing in both of the international matches. The next season he was selected to play for Pakistan in the two matches against the touring Ceylon team in 1949–50. In the second match, he took 2 for 33 and 5 for 53 in a 10-wicket victory for Pakistan. He continued playing first-class cricket in Pakistan for some years but was unable to break into the Test team after Pakistan achieved Test status in 1952.
