= Chandra Sekhar Sahu (weightlifter) =

Indian weightlifter

Personal information
- Nationality: Indian
- Born: Chandra Sekhar Sahu Berhampur, Odisha, India

Sport
- Country: India
- Sport: Weightlifting
Medal record
Men's weightlifting
Representing India
South Asian Games
Gold medal – first place	1991 Colombo	75 kg

Chandra Sekhar Sahu is a former Indian weightlifter who won the gold medal in the men's 75 kg event at the 1991 South Asian Games.

== Personal life ==
Sahu hails from Berhampur and was born in a family of weightlifters. His father, Rama Chandra Sahu, and his brother, Krushna Chandra Sahu, were national-level weightlifters. His son, Punit Chandra Sahu, is a youth-level national weightlifter and a Khelo India Games medalist.

== Career ==
Sahu represented Odisha, Maharashtra, and Railways in the National Weightlifting Championships. He won the gold medal in the men's 75 kg category, lifting 127.5 kg in snatch and 162.5 kg in clean and jerk for a total of 290 kg at the 1991 SAF Games held in Colombo, Sri Lanka. He was also a gold medallist at the Commonwealth Weightlifting Championships.

He also works as a coach, mentoring young weightlifters from across the state for national-level competitions.
