= Poulier =

Poulier is a surname. Notable people with the surname include:

- Hilton Poulier (1909–1979), Ceylonese cricketer
- R. S. V. Poulier (1894–1976), Ceylonese statesman
