= Jayasundera =

Jayasundera is a surname. Notable people with the surname include:

- Akila Jayasundera (born 1992), Sri Lankan cricketer
- Don Jayasundera (1911–1964), Ceylonese cricketer
- Layard Jayasundera, Ceylonese politician
- P. B. Jayasundera, Sri Lankan economist
- Praneth Jayasundera (born 1980), Sri Lankan cricketer
- T. B. Jayasundera, Ceylonese politician
- Thusitha Jayasundera (born 1971), Sri Lankan actress
- Udara Jayasundera (born 1991), Sri Lankan cricketer
- Ukwatte Jayasundera, Ceylonese criminal lawyer
