= Shikha Tandon =

Indian swimmer

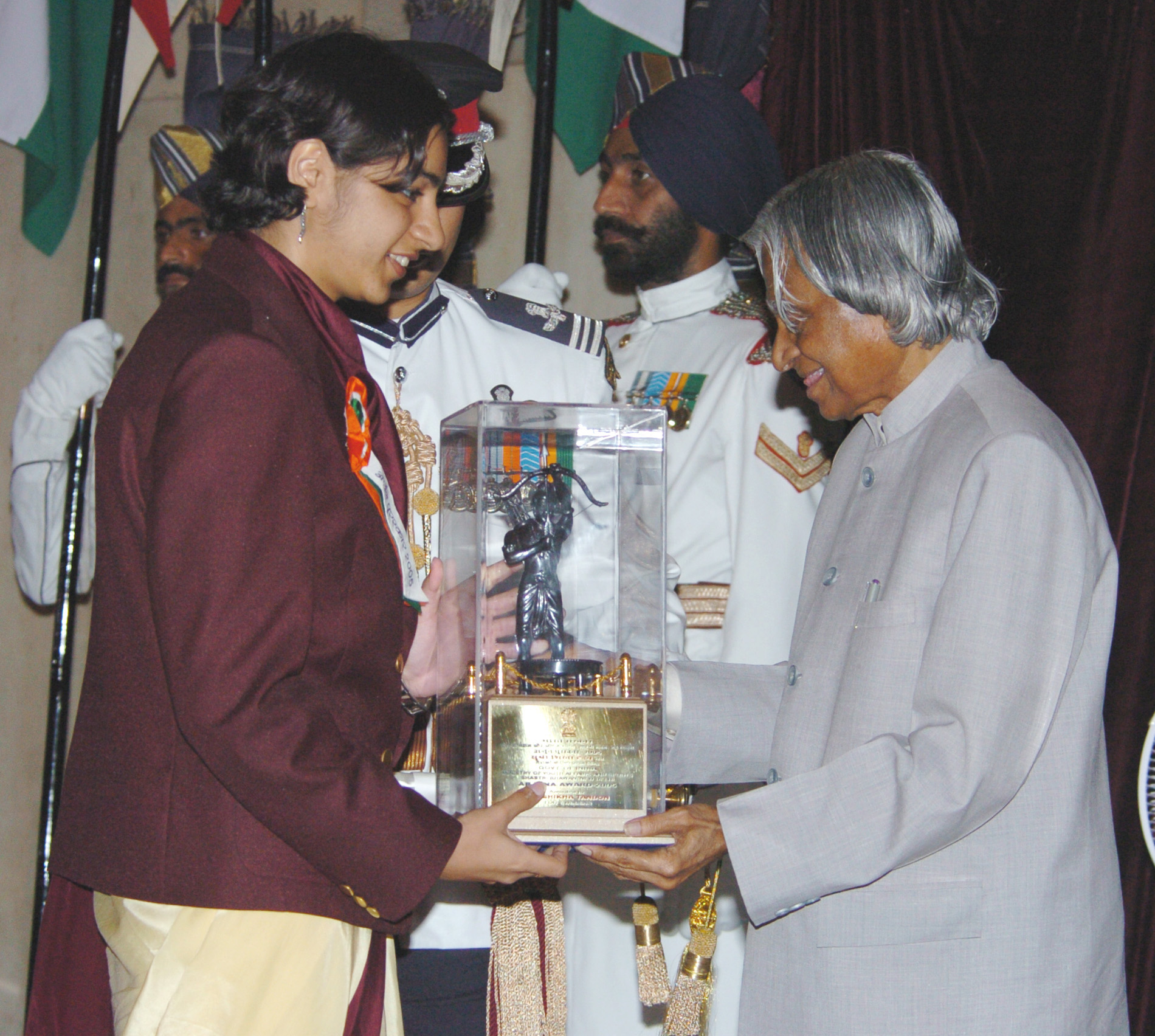
- The President Dr. A.P.J. Abdul Kalam presenting the 2005 Arjuna Award, to Ms. Shikha Tandon for Swimming, at a glittering function in New Delhi on 29 August 2006

Personal information
- National team: India
- Born: 12 January 1985 (age 41) Bangalore, Karnataka, India

Sport
- Sport: Swimming
- Strokes: Freestyle, breaststroke
- College team: Jain University
Medal record
Women's swimming
Representing India
South Asian Games
Silver medal – second place	1999 Kathmandu	200 m freestyle
Silver medal – second place	1999 Kathmandu	400 m freestyle
Silver medal – second place	1999 Kathmandu	100 m breaststroke

Shikha Tandon (born 20 January 1985) is an Indian former swimmer from Bangalore, India. Tandon has won 146 national medals, and 36 medals in international competitions, including five gold medals. Currently, she is a member of USADA’s science team, assisting in the daily operation, development, and maintenance of the resources, reporting, and projects critical to USADA's scientific initiatives.

== Career ==
When she was 12 years old, Tandon was spotted at a state meeting, and was selected to compete in two national events, and won a bronze medal. Tandon went on to compete in the Asian Games at the age of 13, and her first World Championship at 16.

At the 2001 28th junior National aquatic championship, Tandon won the 200 m individual medley, setting a new record.

In 2002, Tandon finished 8th in the 100 m freestyle event at the 100m freestyle at the Asian Games in Busan.

At the 57th Senior National Aquatic Championship in 2003, Tandon broke the Indian women's 50 freestyle record, with a time of 26.61 s. She won five individual gold medals in the competition, and was declared best swimmer for the third consecutive year.

At the 2004 Athens Olympics, Tandon competed in both the 50 m and the 100 m freestyle, the first Indian swimmer to qualify for two separate events in an Olympic competition.

In 2005, Shikha held seven national records, and was the first Indian woman to hold so many simultaneously. In 2005, she was honoured with an Arjuna Award. At the 2006 Melbourne Commonwealth Games, Tandon reached the semi-finals of both 50 m backstroke and 50 m freestyle. In the same year, she became the first female Indian to win an international medal for a short-course event, taking bronze at the indoor Asian age-group swimming Championships in Bangkok. In 2007 Tandon had surgery on her shoulder, and missed many of the season's events.

In 2009, after completing her dual master's degree in Biology and Biotechnology from Case Western Reserve University, she applied at the USADA, and became the first Indian to be employed at the USADA.

== Personal life ==
Tandon has a younger brother called Shobhit, who suffered from asthma. Under advice from doctors, their mother took him swimming to improve his lung capacity, and Tandon joined them.

Her role models include Jenny Thompson and Inge de Bruijn.

Tandon attended Sophia High School, Bangalore and Sri Bhagawan Mahaveer Jain College which comes under the umbrella of Jain University, and then studied biotechnology at Bangalore University.

She completed her dual master's degree in Biology and Biotechnology from Case Western Reserve University, Ohio and is currently working as Science Program Lead at US Antidoping Agency, Colorado Springs, USA.
