= Schokman =

Schokman is a surname. Notable people with the surname include:

- Vernon Schokman (1905–1991), Ceylonese/Sri Lankan cricketer
- V. R. S. Schokman (1887–1953), Ceylonese politician and physician
