= George Hubert =

Sri Lankan cricketer

Personal information
- Born: 1912; Ceylon
- Died: 2 June 1974 (aged 61 or 62)
- Batting: Right-handed

Career statistics
Competition	First-class
Matches	6
Runs scored	244
Batting average	20.33
100s/50s	0/1
Top score	66
Catches/stumpings	3/–
- Source: CricketArchive, 4 January 2018

George S. Hubert (1912 – 2 June 1974) was a cricketer who played on Ceylon's first tour in 1932-33.

Hubert attended Royal College, Colombo. He played for Tamil Union in Colombo as a stylish batsman who sometimes opened, and a brilliant fieldsman.

He took part in Ceylon's tour of India in 1932-33, when he batted well in some of the minor matches but was unsuccessful in the two games against India. Nevertheless he impressed I. M. Mansukhani, who reported on the tour for The Cricketer: "He did run risks, but he had no respect for mere names. He was a dashing bat indeed."

Hubert's highest first-class score was 66 against Sir Julien Cahn's XI in 1936-37, his last first-class match. He was unable to go on Ceylon's second tour, to India in 1940-41.

Hubert also represented Ceylon at hockey, playing against India in 1933.
