= Fairlee =

Fairlee may refer to:

- Fairlee, Isle of Wight, England
- Fairlee, Maryland, United States
- Fairlee, Vermont, United States, a New England town
  - Fairlee (CDP), Vermont, the main village in the town

== See also ==
- Fairlie (disambiguation)
