= International cricket in 1932–33 =

International cricket season

The 1932–33 international cricket season was from September 1932 to April 1933.

== Season overview ==
International tours
Start date	Home team	Away team	Results [Matches]			
Start date	Home team	Away team	Test	ODI	FC	LA
2 December 1932	Australia	England	1–4 [5]	—	—	—
18 December 1932	India	Ceylon	—	—	0–0 [2]	—
24 March 1933	New Zealand	England	0–0 [2]	—	—	—

== December ==
=== England in Australia ===
The Ashes Test series
No.	Date	Home captain	Away captain	Venue	Result
Test 220	2–7 December	Bill Woodfull	Douglas Jardine	Sydney Cricket Ground, Sydney	England by 10 wickets
Test 221	30 Dec–3 January	Bill Woodfull	Douglas Jardine	Melbourne Cricket Ground, Melbourne	Australia by 111 runs
Test 222	13–19 January	Bill Woodfull	Douglas Jardine	Adelaide Oval, Adelaide	England by 338 runs
Test 223	10–16 February	Bill Woodfull	Douglas Jardine	The Gabba, Brisbane	England by 6 wickets
Test 224	23–28 February	Bill Woodfull	Douglas Jardine	Sydney Cricket Ground, Sydney	England by 8 wickets

=== Ceylon in India ===
Three-day Match series
No.	Date	Home captain	Away captain	Venue	Result
Match	18–20 December	Yadavindra Singh	Ed Kelaart	Bagh-e-Jinnah, Lahore	Match drawn
Match	30 Dec–1 January	C. K. Nayudu	Ed Kelaart	Feroz Shah Kotla, Delhi	Match drawn

== March ==
=== England in New Zealand ===
Test series
No.	Date	Home captain	Away captain	Venue	Result
Test 225	24–27 March	Curly Page	Douglas Jardine	AMI Stadium, Christchurch	Match drawn
Test 226	30 Mar–3 April	Curly Page	Bob Wyatt	Eden Park, Auckland	Match drawn
