= Swimming at the 2003 Afro-Asian Games =

The swimming competition at the 2003 Afro-Asian Games was contested in straight finals in Hyderabad, India.

== Results ==
=== Men ===
Event	Gold		Silver		Bronze	
50 m freestyle	Ravil Nachaev; Uzbekistan	23.63	Chen Zuo; China	23.70	Musa Bakare; Nigeria	23.87
100 m freestyle	Takamitsu Kojima; Japan	51.52	Naoki Nagura; Japan	52.26	Aleen Ong Hou Ming; Malaysia	52.44
200 m freestyle	Takamitsu Kojima; Japan	1:54.10	Mahrez Mebarek; Algeria	1:55.29	Nicholas Wilson; South Africa	1:55.69
400 m freestyle	Mahrez Mebarek; Algeria	4:07.66	Nicholas Wilson; South Africa	4:09.56	Charlton Lawson; South Africa	4:14.58
1500 m freestyle	Charlton Lawson; South Africa	16:43.83	Mandar Anand Divase; India	16:49.75	Steven Mangroo; Seychelles	17:29.44
50 m backstroke	Mizuki Wakabayashi; Japan	26.05	Arun Venkatraman; India	28.20	Michael Mars Danila; Philippines	29.12
100 m backstroke	Mizuki Wakabayashi; Japan	56.26	Yoshiki Kanno; Japan	58.24	T.K. Senthil Kumar; India	1:02.04
200 m backstroke	Yoshiki Kanno; Japan	2:07.64	Akbar Ali Mir; India	2:12.66	Mahrez Mebarek; Algeria	2:15.42
50 m breaststroke	Sofiane Daïd; Algeria	29.22	Malik Fall; Senegal	29.45	Eric Williams; Nigeria	29.83
100 m breaststroke	Genki Imamura; Japan	1:03.40	Sofiane Daïd; Algeria	1:03.67	Malik Fall; Senegal	1:05.04
200 m breaststroke	Genki Imamura; Japan	2:17.04	Sofiane Daïd; Algeria	2:17.88	Malik Fall; Senegal	2:20.56
50 m butterfly	Mizuki Wakabayashi; Japan	24.69	Musa Bakare; Nigeria	25.41	Aghiles Slimani; Algeria	25.81
100 m butterfly	Aghiles Slimani; Algeria	56.58	Nabil Kebbab; Algeria	57.44	Lubrey Lim Yu Lung; Malaysia	57.45
200 m butterfly	Yohei Kato; Japan	2:03.96	Aghiles Slimani; Algeria	2:05.92	Rehan Poncha; India	2:07.90
200 m individual medley	Ouyang Kunpeng; China	2:06.65	Yohei Kato; Japan	2:07.31	Sofiane Daïd; Algeria	2:08.23
400 m individual medley	Sofiane Daïd; Algeria	4:39.89	Malik Fall; Senegal	4:44.17	Rehan Poncha; India	4:45.71
4 × 100 m freestyle relay	Africa Select	3:30.45	China	3:44.82	India	3:45.42
4 × 200 m freestyle relay	Africa Select	7:57.82	India	8:09.57	Uzbekistan	8:14.59
4 × 100 m medley relay	Japan	3:46.45	Africa Select	3:56.71	India	4:07.89

=== Women ===
Event	Gold		Silver		Bronze	
50 m freestyle	Zhong Xiaowei; China	26.20	Shikha Tandon; India	26.50	Atsumi Yamada; Japan	26.79
100 m freestyle	Atsumi Yamada; Japan	57.92	Christine Zwiegers; South Africa	58.00	Shikha Tandon; India	58.61
200 m freestyle	Zhu Yingwen; China	2:06.45	Christine Zwiegers; South Africa	2:06.72	Nisha Millet; India	2:07.56
400 m freestyle	Chen Hua; China	4:25.90	Nisha Millet; India	4:31.33	Natalie du Toit; South Africa	4:32.53
800 m freestyle	Shrone Austin; Seychelles	9:16.46	Natalie du Toit; South Africa	9:17.92	Velia Janse van Rensburg; South Africa	9:19.74
50 m backstroke	Obia Inyengiyikabo; Nigeria	31.68	Lianne Marice Marquez; Philippines	31.92	Reshma Millet; India	32.06
100 m backstroke	Nozomi Nobe; Japan	1:04.34	Bang Eun-gi; South Korea	1:05.70	Obia Inyengiyikabo; Nigeria	1:07.78
200 m backstroke	Nozomi Nobe; Japan	2:20.00	Bang Eun-gi; South Korea	2:22.46	Nisha Millet; India	2:27.40
50 m breaststroke	Ziada Jardine; South Africa	33.12	Jung Seul-ki; South Korea	33.97	Ingrid Haiden; South Africa	34.04
100 m breaststroke	Ingrid Haiden; South Africa	1:12.40	Hiroka Sakamoto; Japan	1:13.29	Ziada Jardine; South Africa	1:13.47
200 m breaststroke	Hiroka Sakamoto; Japan	2:33.50	Ingrid Haiden; South Africa	2:35.62	Cho A-rra; South Korea	2:37.53
50 m butterfly	Lauren Sparg; South Africa	28.53	Atsumi Yamada; Japan	29.20	Chanelle van Wyk; South Africa	29.26
100 m butterfly	Lauren Sparg; South Africa	1:03.24	Chanelle van Wyk; South Africa	1:04.26	Luisa Gavazzi; Zimbabwe	1:05.38
200 m butterfly	Park Kyung-hwa; South Korea	2:15.90	Shin Bo-mi; South Korea	2:19.91	Chanelle van Wyk; South Africa	2:20.92
200 m individual medley	Lee Sun-a; South Korea	2:25.03	Sabria Faiza Dahane; Algeria	2:25.83	Luisa Gavazzi; Zimbabwe	2:28.69
400 m individual medley	Lee Sun-a; South Korea	5:08.87	Richa Mishra; India	5:10.99	Sabria Faiza Dahane; Algeria	5:11.70
4 × 100 m freestyle relay	South Korea	4:00.07	Africa Select	4:04.43	India	4:16.55
4 × 200 m freestyle relay	China	8:39.35	Africa Select	8:58.06	India	9:09.08
4 × 100 m medley relay	Africa Select	4:24.58	India	4:37.51	Philippines	4:48.13
