= International cricket in 1933–34 =

International cricket season

The 1933–34 international cricket season was from September 1933 to April 1934. The season consisted of several first-class international tours.

== Season overview ==
International tours
Start date	Home team	Away team	Results [Matches]			
Start date	Home team	Away team	Test	ODI	FC	LA
15 December 1933	India	England	0–2 [3]	—	—	—
16 February 1934	Ceylon	Marylebone	—	—	0–2 [2]	—
4 March 1934	India	Marylebone	—	—	0–0 [1]	—

== December ==
=== England in India ===
Test Series
No.	Date	Home captain	Away captain	Venue	Result
Test 230	15–18 December	C. K. Nayudu	Douglas Jardine	Gymkhana Ground, Bombay	England by 9 wickets
Test 231	5–8 January	C. K. Nayudu	Douglas Jardine	Eden Gardens, Calcutta	Match drawn
Test 232	10–13 February	C. K. Nayudu	Douglas Jardine	Madras Cricket Club Ground, Madras	England by 202 runs

== February ==
=== MCC in Ceylon ===
Three-day Match series
No.	Date	Home captain	Away captain	Venue	Result
Match 1	16–18 February	Basil Gunasekara	Douglas Jardine	Colombo Cricket Club Ground, Colombo	Marylebone by 10 wickets
Match 2	22–24 February	Churchill Gunasekara	Bryan Valentine	Colombo Cricket Club Ground, Colombo	Marylebone by 8 runs

== March ==
=== MCC in India ===
Three-day Match
No.	Date	Home captain	Away captain	Venue	Result
Match	4–6 March	Maharajkumar of Vizianagram	Douglas Jardine	Gymkhana Ground, Bombay	Match drawn
