= Neil Joseph =

Sri Lankan cricketer

Personal information
- Full name: Neil Stanley Joseph
- Born: 1906
- Died: September 21, 1947 (aged 41); Colombo, Ceylon
- Batting: Right-handed

Career statistics
Competition	First-class
Matches	8
Runs scored	239
Batting average	17.07
100s/50s	0/1
Top score	78
Balls bowled	224
Wickets	4
Bowling average	40.50
5 wickets in innings	0
10 wickets in match	0
Best bowling	1/11
Catches/stumpings	9/–
- Source: CricketArchive, 27 September 2017

Neil Stanley Joseph (1906 – 21 September 1947) was a Sri Lankan sportsman who played cricket for All-Ceylon in the 1930s. In a one-day match against the touring Australians in 1930, he dismissed Don Bradman hit wicket with the first ball he bowled. Bradman had made 40 when he got out.

Joseph was educated at Royal College, Colombo. In 1925 he scored his first Royal-Thomian century, a superb 113 made in only 65 minutes. In 1926 he scored 133. His aggregate of 317 runs for the series stood unbeaten until 1957.

He played eight first-class matches for Ceylon between 1932 and 1935. His highest score was 78 against MCC in 1933–34, when no one else for Ceylon in the match reached 30. He went on Ceylon's first tour, to India in 1932-33.

While at college, he cleared 20 feet and 11 inches (6.37m) in long jump. He was goal-keeper for St Michael's soccer club in senior competition, and a golfer of high standard. His obituary called him "one of the greatest all-round sportsmen that Ceylon has ever had".

Joseph worked as a newspaper reporter for the Times of Ceylon for some years. He died in September 1947 after a long illness, aged 41.
