= Fairlie =

Fairlie may refer to:

== People ==
- Fairlie (surname)
- Fairlie Dalphatado (1924–2010), Sri Lankan cricketer
- Fairlie Harmar (1876–1945), English painter

== Places ==
- Fairlies Knob National Park, in Queensland, Australia
- Fairlie, New Zealand, a town in the South Island of New Zealand
- Fairlie, North Ayrshire, a village in North Ayrshire, Scotland
- Fairlie–Poplar, Atlanta, United States
- Fairlie, Texas, United States

== Other uses ==
- Fairlie locomotive, a type of railway steam locomotive
- Fairlie (1810 ship)
- the Fairlie Mortar, a design of anti-submarine mortar
