= International cricket in 1951–52 =

International cricket season

The 1951–52 international cricket season was from September 1951 to April 1952.

== Season overview ==
International tours
Start date	Home team	Away team	Results [Matches]			
Start date	Home team	Away team	Test	ODI	FC	LA
2 November 1951	India	England	1–1 [5]	—	—	—
9 November 1951	Australia	West Indies	4–1 [5]	—	—	—
10 November 1951	Pakistan	Marylebone	—	—	1–0 [4]	—
8 February 1952	New Zealand	West Indies	0–1 [2]	—	—	—
16 February 1952	Ceylon	Marylebone	—	—	1–1 [2]	—

== November ==
=== England in India ===
Test series
No.	Date	Home captain	Away captain	Venue	Result
Test 339	16–18 October	Vijay Hazare	Nigel Howard	Feroz Shah Kotla Ground, Delhi	Match drawn
Test 342	13–16 November	Vijay Hazare	Nigel Howard	Brabourne Stadium, Bombay	Match drawn
Test 344	12–15 December	Vijay Hazare	Nigel Howard	Eden Gardens, Calcutta	Match drawn
Test 346	23–26 October	Vijay Hazare	Nigel Howard	Green Park, Kanpur	England by 8 wickets
Test 348	28–1 December	Vijay Hazare	Donald Carr	Madras Cricket Club Ground, Madras	India by an innings and 8 runs

=== West Indies in Australia ===
Test series
No.	Date	Home captain	Away captain	Venue	Result
Test 340	9–13 November	Lindsay Hassett	John Goddard	The Gabba, Brisbane	Australia by 3 wickets
Test 341	30 Nov–5 December	Lindsay Hassett	John Goddard	Sydney Cricket Ground, Sydney	Australia by 7 wickets
Test 343	22–25 December	Arthur Morris	John Goddard	Adelaide Oval, Adelaide	West Indies by 6 wickets
Test 345	31 Dec–3 January	Lindsay Hassett	John Goddard	Melbourne Cricket Ground, Melbourne	Australia by 1 wicket
Test 347	25–29 January	Lindsay Hassett	Jeffrey Stollmeyer	Sydney Cricket Ground, Sydney	Australia by 202 runs

=== MCC in Pakistan ===
First-class series
No.	Date	Home captain	Away captain	Venue	Result
Match 1	10–12 November	Jahangir Khan	Donald Carr	Jinnah Park, Sialkot	Match drawn
Match 2	15–18 November	Abdul Kardar	Nigel Howard	Bagh-e-Jinnah Ground, Lahore	Match drawn
Match 3	24–26 November	Hasan Mahmood	Nigel Howard	Dring Stadium, Bahawalpur	Match drawn
Match 4	29 Nov–2 December	Abdul Kardar	Nigel Howard	Gymkhana Ground, Karachi	Pakistan by 4 wickets

== February ==
=== West Indies in New Zealand ===
Test series
No.	Date	Home captain	Away captain	Venue	Result
Test 349	8–12 February	Bert Sutcliffe	John Goddard	AMI Stadium, Christchurch	West Indies by 5 wickets
Test 350	15–19 February	Bert Sutcliffe	John Goddard	Eden Park, Auckland	Match drawn

=== MCC in Ceylon ===
First-class series
No.	Date	Home captain	Away captain	Venue	Result
Match 1	16–18 February	Fredrick de Saram	Donald Carr	P Saravanamuttu Stadium, Colombo	Commonwealth XI by an innings and 259 runs
Match 2	22–24 February	Fredrick de Saram	Donald Carr	P Saravanamuttu Stadium, Colombo	Marylebone by an innings and 33 runs
