= International cricket in 1935–36 =

International cricket season

The 1935–36 international cricket season was from September 1935 to April 1936.

== Season overview ==
International tours
Start date	Home team	Away team	Results [Matches]			
Start date	Home team	Away team	Test	ODI	FC	LA
25 October 1935	Ceylon	Australia	—	—	1–0 [1]	—
5 November 1935	South Africa	Australia	0-4 [5]	—	—	—
5 December 1935	India	Australia	—	—	2–2 [4]	—
6 December 1935	Australia	Marylebone	—	—	0–1 [1]	—
10 January 1936	New Zealand	Marylebone	—	—	0–0 [4]	—
22 February 1936	Jamaica	Yorkshire	—	—	0–1 [3]	—

== October ==
=== Australia in Ceylon ===
First-class match
No.	Date	Home captain	Away captain	Venue	Result
Match	25–26 October	Chippy Gunasekara	Jack Ryder	Victoria Park, Colombo	Australia by an innings and 127 runs

== November ==
=== Australia in South Africa ===
Test series
No.	Date	Home captain	Away captain	Venue	Result
Test 247	14–18 December	Herby Wade	Vic Richardson	Kingsmead, Durban	Australia by 9 wickets
Test 248	24–28 December	Herby Wade	Vic Richardson	Old Wanderers, Johannesburg	Match drawn
Test 249	1–4 January	Herby Wade	Vic Richardson	Newlands, Cape Town	Australia by an innings and 78 runs
Test 250	15–17 February	Herby Wade	Vic Richardson	Old Wanderers, Johannesburg	Australia by an innings and 184 runs
Test 251	28 Feb–3 March	Herby Wade	Vic Richardson	Kingsmead, Durban	Australia by an innings and 6 runs

== December ==
=== Australia in India ===
Unofficial Test series
No.	Date	Home captain	Away captain	Venue	Result
Match 1	5–7 December	Yadavindra Singh	Jack Ryder	Gymkhana Ground, Bombay	Australia by 9 wickets
Match 2	31 Dec–1 January	C. K. Nayudu	Jack Ryder	Eden Gardens, Calcutta	Australia by 8 wickets
Match 3	10–13 January	Wazir Ali	Jack Ryder	Bagh-e-Jinnah, Lahore	India by 68 runs
Match 4	6–8 February	Wazir Ali	Jack Ryder	Madras Cricket Club Ground, Chennai	India by 33 runs

=== MCC in Australia ===
First-class match
No.	Date	Home captain	Away captain	Venue	Result
Match	6–10 December	Hans Ebeling	Errol Holmes	Sydney Cricket Ground, Sydney	Marylebone by 203 runs

== January ==
=== MCC in New Zealand ===
First-class Series
No.	Date	Home captain	Away captain	Venue	Result
Match 1	10–13 January	Ian Cromb	Errol Holmes	Carisbrook, Dunedin	Match drawn
Match 2	17–20 January	Ian Cromb	Charles Lyttelton	Basin Reserve, Wellington	Match drawn
Match 3	28 Feb–2 March	Ian Cromb	Errol Holmes	Eden Park, Auckland	Match drawn
Match 4	6–9 March	Ian Cromb	Errol Holmes	AMI Stadium, Christchurch	Match drawn

== February ==
=== Yorkshire in Jamaica ===
First-class match
No.	Date	Home captain	Away captain	Venue	Result
Match 1	22–26 February	Noel Newton Nethersole	Paul Gibb	Melbourne Park, Kingston	Yorkshire by 5 wickets
Match 2	4–9 March	Noel Newton Nethersole	Paul Gibb	Melbourne Park, Kingston	Match drawn
Match 3	11–16 March	Noel Newton Nethersole	Paul Gibb	Sabina Park, Kingston	Match drawn
