= Claude van der Straaten =

Ceylonese cricketer

Personal information
- Born: 1905; Ceylon
- Died: June 1962 (aged 56 or 57); Perth, Australia
- Batting: Right-handed
- Bowling: Right-arm spin

Career statistics
Competition	First-class
Matches	4
Runs scored	71
Batting average	11.83
100s/50s	0/0
Top score	41
Balls bowled	18
Wickets	0
Bowling average	–
5 wickets in innings	–
10 wickets in match	–
Best bowling	–
Catches/stumpings	2/–
- Source: Cricinfo, 1 January 2018

Claude van der Straaten, also spelt Vanderstaaten and Vanderstraaten (1905 – 1962) was a cricketer who played on Ceylon's first tour in 1932–33.

Van der Straaten attended St. Joseph's College, Colombo. He was a renowned hitter in Ceylon. Playing for Burgher Recreation Club in a senior club match against Colombo Cricket Club in January 1931 he hit 232 in 90 minutes, including 20 sixes and 15 fours.

He took part in Ceylon's tour of India in 1932-33, but was not successful. An Indian journalist described him as having considerable talent but lacking discrimination in his hitting. His highest score was 41, batting at number eight in the first of the two matches against India.

Van der Straaten later moved to Perth, Western Australia. Playing in a 10-a-side railways club match in 1950 for Perth Goods, he took all nine wickets for 23. He died in Perth in June 1962.
