= Sophia High School =

- 70 Palace Road; Bangalore; Karnataka 560 001; India

Information
- Type: Private
- Motto: Truth and Universal Love
- Established: 1949; 77 years ago
- Enrollment: 2,900+
- Area: 10 acres (40,000 m2) land
- Colors: Beige and brown
- Affiliation: School Sisters of Notre Dame
- Information: 080-22355565
- Website: www.sophiahighschool.org

Sophia High School is a private Convent school in Bangalore, India. The middle, primary and high schools are girls only, while the nursery school is co-education.

== History ==
Sophia High School is located in central Bangalore overlooking the Vidhan Soudha and Bangalore golf course.

In August 1948, when the Internuncio and the Apostolic Delegation shifted to New Delhi, his residence and grounds in the heart of Bangalore was taken over by a group of Catholic sisters of the Society of the Sacred Heart, RSCJ. In January 1949, three pioneers of the order, Mother Catherine Andersson, Mother Ivy Bourke and Sister Dorothy Bullen opened a school called the "Convent of the Sacred Heart" in the only residential building on the grounds, the old "white bungalow". A Montessori class with 17 students and one qualified teacher was established. About 40% of the students admitted were not Indian nationals. In 1957 the school's name was changed to "Sophia High School" after St Madeline Sophie Barat, a founder of the Society of the Sacred Heart.

In 1972 the Society of the Sacred Heart reviewed their strategy in India, and handed off several local schools, including Sophia High School, to other Catholic groups, in order to focus on schools that needed funding and attention, especially in India's rural areas. Sophia High School was taken over by the School Sisters of Notre Dame.

Since then the school has grown significantly. The school's current enrollment is over 2,000 students. The school is not a religious organization and its students, who are chosen through a competitive interview process, are from many different ethnicities. The founding "white bungalow" still stands on campus and was remodeled in 1998.

The Times of India has called it one of Bangalore's "legendary" schools with "a historic past", and one of the city's "top schools" which, before the 1990s, "had identities that went beyond their names".

== Notable alumni ==
- Justice B.V. Nagarathna, Judge, Supreme Court of India
- Dr Pratima Murthy, Director, NIMHANS, Bangalore

=== Athletes ===
- Nisha Millet, Olympic swimmer
- Shikha Tandon, Olympic swimmer
- Khushi Dinesh, swimmer
- Jayawanti Shyam, basketball
- Sagarika Dayum, basketball
- Varsha Sanjeev, Snooker, billiards

=== Models and actors ===
- Deepika Padukone, actor and producer
- Kirtana Kumar, actor, director, film-maker and writer
- Vaishali Desai, model and actor
- Nicole Faria, actor, model and beauty pageant winner
- Roshmitha Harimurthy, model and beauty pageant winner
- Sharmiela Mandre, actor and producer
- Bina Rajagopal screen name Chaitali, actor
- Neha Shetty, actor
- Roopal Tyagi, choreographer and actor

== See also ==
- List of schools in Bangalore
