= Rusi Dinshaw =

Pakistani cricketer (1928–2014)

Personal information
- Full name: Rusi Nausherwan Dinshaw
- Born: 7 February 1928; Karachi, British India
- Died: 24 March 2014 (aged 86); Karachi, Pakistan
- Batting: Left-handed
- Role: Batsman

Domestic team information
- Years: Team
- 1948–1949: Sind

Career statistics
Competition	First-class
Matches	9
Runs scored	171
Batting average	14.25
100s/50s	0/0
Top score	35
Balls bowled	0
Wickets	–
Bowling average	–
5 wickets in innings	–
10 wickets in match	–
Best bowling	–
Catches/stumpings	6/–
- Source: Cricinfo, 25 May 2019

Rusi Nausherwan Dinshaw (7 February 1928 – 24 March 2014) was a Pakistani cricketer who played first-class cricket from 1948 to 1952.

A left-handed batsman, Dinshaw played in both unofficial Tests when Ceylon toured Pakistan in 1949-50, without making a substantial score. Later he was a member of the first Pakistan Test squad, which toured India in 1952–53. He never played in a Test, but he is the only Parsi to have ever been selected in a Pakistan Test squad.
