= Ben Navaratne =

Sri Lankan cricketer

- Navaratne in 1947

Personal information
- Full name: Benedict Navaratne
- Born: 1916; Ceylon
- Died: 15 February 1979 (aged 62 or 63); Kandy, Sri Lanka
- Role: Wicketkeeper

Career statistics
Competition	First-class
Matches	16
Runs scored	304
Batting average	16.88
100s/50s	0/1
Top score	58
Catches/stumpings	13/12
- Source: CricketArchive, 25 September 2017

Benedict Navaratne (1916 – 9 June 1979) was a cricketer who kept wicket for Ceylon in first-class cricket from 1940 to 1952.

He toured with the Ceylon team to India in 1940-41 and Pakistan in 1949-50. He had a reputation for standing up to the stumps to all but the fastest bowlers. His obituary in the 1980 Wisden, shortly before Sri Lanka achieved Test status, called him "Sri Lanka's greatest wicket-keeper".

Playing in a one-day match against the touring Australian team in early 1948, Navaratne's keeping earned high praise from the visitors. Sir Donald Bradman is reported to have said that he would like to have Navaratne in his team.
