= Kirtana Kumar =

Indian actor and filmmaker

- Born: 8 March 1966 (age 60); Bangalore, Karnataka
- Occupations: Theatre Artist, Theatre Trainer and Film Maker
- Spouse: Konarak Reddy

Kirtana Kumar (born 8 March 1966) is an Indian actor, director, and film-maker based in Bengaluru. She writes on theatre and film and has been published in various national papers and magazines. She has a master's degree in European Classics and American Literature. She has received several major awards and fellowships including from the McArthur Foundation and India Foundation for the Arts for her contribution to theatre & film. She was educated at Sophia High School, Bangalore. She is a trustee of Women Artists' Group, runs the year long Theatre Lab for children and is the co-owner of Infinite Souls Farm, a rural artists residency in Bangalore.

== Life in Theatre ==
Kirtana Kumar trained and performed for six years as an actor with The Asian-American Theatre Project at "The Los Angeles Theatre Centre" She is trained in Suzuki Theatre & Butoh, thang-ta, kalari payattu and voice technique. She continues to study with and train other artists.

Over the years, her work has included lead roles in plays such as "Agnes of God", "Gati & Bhagawadajukam" at Questor's Theatre, London, the world premiere of Bill C. Davis’ "Spine" at the Cast Theatre, Los Angeles, "Shakuntala" at Trestle Theatre, St. Alban's and a stage adaptation of Sri Aurobindo's Savitri called "In the Hour of God". Her production of Genet's classic "The Maids" played at several festivals including the Ranga Shankara Festival and Bahuroopi Festival at Rangayana. Her solo work includes Dario Fo "Medea" & "Orgasmo Adulto" and "Unruly Women – Or Shakespeare's Chicks", a lec-dem devised by her based on women characters in the plays of Shakespeare. She received a New Performance Grant from India Foundation for the Arts for her path-breaking promenade play "The Wedding Party" which received much critical acclaim. Subsequently, she directed Eugène Ionesco's "The Bald Soprano" and most recently, directed and performed in Dario Fo's "Orgasmo Adulto Escapes from the Zoo" for Jagriti Theatre. She is currently directing Steven Berkoff's "The Secret Love Life of Ophelia" for the Bangalore stage and is reviving "The Wedding Party" as both a promenade and proscenium performance.

For the past 4 years she has been engaged in an Indo-German collaboration between Ranga Shankara and Schnawwl, Mannheim. In 2011, she choreographed the Schnawwl production of the Ramayana called Das Lied von Rama. She is the dramaturg and assistant director of the internationally acclaimed "Boy with a Suitcase" which most recently played at Augen Blick Mal in Berlin 2013. After Berlin, Kirtana conducted a workshop on Illusion and Reality in Theatre for the actor's ensemble at Munster Stadt-Theatre.

In 1999, she was a facilitator for the Royal National Theatre Youth Project – Project Nadia. In September 2001 she was commissioned by Common Ground Sign Dance Theatre Company, Liverpool to write and direct a new piece for them. This resulted in a work titled Karma Café. The play premiered in Manchester. She facilitated the Common Ground performance and workshop tour of India and made an experimental film called "Once Upon a Warm September" on the Common Ground tour of South Canara. In 2004 she directed Picasso's "Four Little Girls" as an experiment with words and paint.

In order to work laterally and politically with theatre, Kirtana has been facilitating theatre projects on gender and sexuality for the non-governmental sector. Some of the organizations she has consulted with include ISST, Sakshi, Ifsha, Hengsara Hakkina Sangha, National Law School Autonomous law schools in India, World Vision and United Theological College. One of these workshops was the genesis for the play My Children who should be running thru Vast Open Spaces... which was subsequently turned into a documentary film for Madhyam. In 2006 she was a consultant to Path India on a Magnet Theatre/ HIV/AIDS risk reduction project in four states. In 2009 she was Director of Ancillary Programs at the Ranga Shankara's Children's Theatre Festival.

== Filmography ==
=== As a film director ===
- 1993: My Children Who should be Running Through Vast Open Spaces - Kirtana directed My Children Who should be Running Through Vast Open Spaces, a documentary film on child sexual abuse.
- 1997: Guhya - she was awarded a MacArthur Fellowship to make a film on Feminine Sexual Symbols and Rituals in four states in India. This film, "Guhya", was awarded the First Prize (Long Documentary Category) in the New Delhi Video Forum organized by NISCORT. Guhya opened the Nottam traveling documentary film festival on 20 April 2001 in Trivandrum. It was chosen as part of the women's retrospective "First Story" in Portugal. It was awarded a citation at the Vatican City, Rome in 2002. It was screened at Film South Asia '01, Kathmandu and at the Mumbai International Film Festival February 2002.
- 2001: The Simputer Project - After Guhya Kirtana directed The Simputer Project - a film about technology and development. It is inspired by the idea of free software and the Open Source Initiative. It has most recently been screened for a Think Tank of scientists at the Media Lab in Massachusetts Institute of Technology (MIT), Boston. Subsequently, she made The Simputer Project II on using the Simputer in tribal communities in Chhattisgarh.
- 2000: Once upon a warm September... - Kirtana made a 5-minute silent short called "Once upon a warm September..." It was made while working with Liverpool-based Common Ground Sign-Dance Theatre Company, a company of deaf and hearing actors. It was screened at the Kathmandu Film Festival and has toured as part of the Dus Goongi Film in package.
- 2005: Namma Cinema Talkies, Chandri - For the University of California, San Francisco & Samuha, Kirtana made two films, one a process document on Adolescent Health & Livelihoods called Namma Cinema Talkies and the second, a slice-of-life film, on a young Lambani girl called Chandri. Chandri was screened in San Francisco and both films traveled to the Feminale International Women's Film Festival in Cologne, Germany. Chandri was selected to be screened at the One Billion Eyes Festival in Chennai.
