= Ernie Kelaart =

Sri Lankan cricketer

Personal information
- Full name: Ernest Colvin Kelaart
- Born: 29 June 1922; Colombo, Ceylon
- Died: 11 September 2008 (aged 86); Melbourne, Australia
- Batting: Right-handed
- Bowling: Right-arm medium-pace
- Relatives: Ed Kelaart (uncle); Mervyn Kelaart (uncle)

Career statistics
Competition	First-class
Matches	9
Runs scored	166
Batting average	11.85
100s/50s	0/0
Top score	38 not out
Balls bowled	822
Wickets	7
Bowling average	48.57
5 wickets in innings	0
10 wickets in match	0
Best bowling	2/19
Catches/stumpings	5/–
- Source: CricketArchive, 1 October 2017

Ernest Colvin Kelaart (29 June 1922 – 11 September 2008) was a cricketer who played first-class cricket for Ceylon between 1950 and 1958. He toured Pakistan in 1949-50.

He married Barbara Nellie Joseph in Colombo in 1952. They had three sons and three daughters, and moved with their family to Australia. He died in Melbourne in September 2008.
