= Basavanagudi Aquatic Centre =

Swimming venue in Bengaluru, India

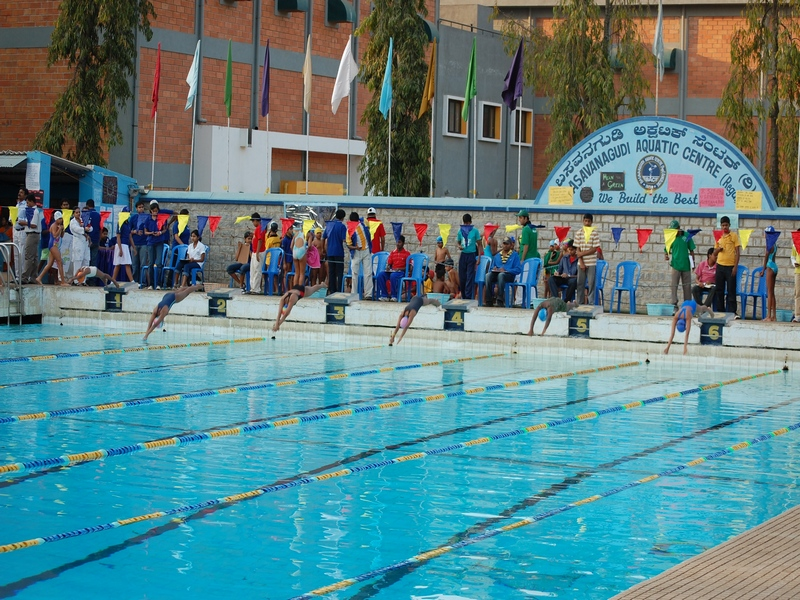
- Basavanagudi Aquatic Centre
- Interactive map of Basavanagudi Aquatic Centre
- Location: Pampamahakavi Road, Sankarapuram, Basavanagudi, Bengaluru, India, 560004
- Coordinates: 12.951751°N 77.572703°E
- Capacity: 1,200
- Facilities: 8 lane 25 metre Elite training pool, Baby pool, Gym
- Dimensions: 8 - lane 50 metre pool

Construction
- Opened: 1986

Website
- www.swimbac.in

Basavanagudi Aquatic Centre (BAC) is a premier swimming training centre located in Bengaluru, India. At any given time, the Centre caters to more than 400 regular swimmers from different age groups at various levels. Many of India's international swimmers train here. The centre works full-time and has got the status of a professional Aquatic Centre. The staff consists of many well trained coaches under the head coach Pradeep Kumar.

Bengaluru became the destination for talented swimmers of India in the 1980s as it boasted a swimming academy culture by several clubs and was supported by year round pleasant weather for training. In 1986 Basavanagudi Aquatic Centre was started and soon it became a sought after training centre for elite swimmers from all over India.

== International Swimmers ==
Some of India's notable international swimmers who have trained at this pool are Nisha Millet, Rehan Poncha, Aaron D'souza, Rohit Halvaldar, Mandar Divase, Talasha Prabhu, Arjun JP, Fariha Zaman, Shubha C, Arhata Magavi.

== Events ==
Notable events hosted at BAC:

1. IWAS World Wheelchair and Amputee Games 2009
2. Junior National Aquatic Meet, 2010

== See also ==
- List of Indian records in swimming
- India at the 2008 Summer Olympics
- Nisha Millet
- Swimming at the 2009 Asian Youth Games
