= Mervyn Kelaart =

Ceylonese cricketer (1908–1968)

Personal information
- Full name: Allanson Mervyn Henry Kelaart
- Born: 7 May 1908; Colombo, Ceylon
- Died: 2 February 1968 (aged 59); Melbourne, Australia
- Batting: Left-handed
- Bowling: Right-arm medium-pace
- Relatives: Ed Kelaart (brother); Ernie Kelaart (nephew)

Career statistics
Competition	First-class
Matches	10
Runs scored	407
Batting average	20.35
100s/50s	1/1
Top score	101
Balls bowled	1479
Wickets	16
Bowling average	38.12
5 wickets in innings	0
10 wickets in match	0
Best bowling	4/70
Catches/stumpings	8/–
- Source: Cricinfo, 26 September 2017

Allanson Mervyn Henry Kelaart (7 May 1908 – 2 February 1968) was a Ceylonese cricketer who played first-class cricket between 1932 and 1940. He scored Ceylon's first international century.

Mervyn Kelaart was a left-handed batsman who was particularly proficient at cutting and leg-glancing, and a right-arm medium-pace bowler. At St. Joseph's College, Colombo, he headed both the batting and bowling averages. On Ceylon's first tour, to India in 1932-33, batting at number three he scored a century in the first of the two matches against India, 101 out of Ceylon's total of 287. His brother Ed was Ceylon's captain in the match. Mervyn also toured India in 1940-41.

Kelaart married Neliya Foenander in Colombo in June 1933. They had two daughters and two sons. In 1957 they moved to England, and in 1964 they moved to Australia.
