= Laddie Bakelman =

Sri Lankan cricketer

Personal information
- Full name: Ladislaus Edmund Bakelman
- Born: 1900; Ceylon
- Died: 1965 (aged 64 or 65); Ceylon
- Batting: Right-handed
- Bowling: Slow left-arm orthodox

Career statistics
Competition	First-class
Matches	5
Runs scored	12
Batting average	4.00
100s/50s	0/0
Top score	7*
Balls bowled
Wickets	35
Bowling average	15.28
5 wickets in innings	4
10 wickets in match	2
Best bowling	6/34
Catches/stumpings	1/–
- Source: Cricinfo, 16 September 2017

Ladislaus Edmund "Laddie" Bakelman (1900 – 1965) was a cricketer who played on Ceylon's first tour in 1932–33.

Laddie Bakelman attended St. Benedict's College, Colombo, where he was one of the leading schoolboy bowlers in Ceylon. A slow-medium left-arm spinner, he was able to make the ball move either way off the pitch. He played for Bloomfield in Colombo club cricket.

He was the leading bowler on Ceylon's tour of India in 1932-33, taking 35 wickets in five first-class matches at an average of 15.28. In the two victories on the tour, Ceylon's first-ever first-class victories, he took 23 wickets for 202: 6 for 34 and 6 for 65 against Patiala, and 6 for 42 and 5 for 61 against Central Provinces and Berar.

He became a prominent umpire and schools coach in Ceylon.
