= Fairlie Dalphatado =

Sri Lankan cricketer

Fairlie Dalpathado

Personal information
- Full name: Fairlie George Dalpathado
- Born: 17 August 1924; Chilaw, Ceylon
- Died: 6 January 2010 (aged 85); Kirilapone, Sri Lanka
- Batting: Right-handed
- Bowling: Right-arm medium-pace

Career statistics
Competition	First-class
Matches	3
Runs scored	48
Batting average	9.60
100s/50s	0/0
Top score	34
Balls bowled	378
Wickets	3
Bowling average	66.66
5 wickets in innings	0
10 wickets in match	0
Best bowling	1/37
Catches/stumpings	1/–
- Source: CricketArchive, 1 October 2017

Fairlie George Dalpathado (17 August 1924 – 6 January 2010) was a cricketer who played three matches of first-class cricket for Ceylon in 1949 and 1950.

A middle-order batsman and medium-pace bowler, Fairlie Dalphatado was a champion schoolboy cricketer at St Joseph's College, Colombo. He captained the school's team in 1943, when they went through the season unbeaten and finished by dismissing the Combined Schools XI for 35, Dalphatado taking 6 for 17. After leaving school he had a long career in domestic cricket with Sinhalese Sports Club, and coached the cricket team at St Joseph's College for more than 20 years.

He represented Ceylon in the unofficial Test against the touring West Indians in 1948-49 and toured Pakistan with Ceylon in 1949-50, when he played in both unofficial Tests. He also represented Ceylon at tennis, competing in the first Asian Tennis Championship.

Dalphatado worked as a manager in the tea industry. He married an Indian lady, Therese Abraham, whom he had met while on one of his tennis tours in India. They had a son and two daughters.
