= International cricket in 1972–73 =

International cricket season

The 1972–73 international cricket season was from September 1972 to April 1973.

== Season overview ==
International tours
Start date	Home team	Away team	Results [Matches]			
Start date	Home team	Away team	Test	ODI	FC	LA
20 December 1972	India	England	2–1 [5]	—	—	—
22 December 1972	Australia	Pakistan	3–0 [3]	—	—	—
2 February 1973	New Zealand	Pakistan	0–1 [3]	1–0 [1]	—	—
16 February 1973	West Indies	Australia	0–2 [5]	—	—	—
2 March 1973	Pakistan	England	0–0 [3]	—	—	—

== December ==
=== England in India ===
Test series
No.	Date	Home captain	Away captain	Venue	Result
Test 703	20–25 December	Ajit Wadekar	Tony Lewis	Feroz Shah Kotla Ground, Delhi	England by 6 wickets
Test 706	30 Dec–4 January	Ajit Wadekar	Tony Lewis	Eden Gardens, Calcutta	India by 28 runs
Test 708	12–17 January	Ajit Wadekar	Tony Lewis	MA Chidambaram Stadium, Madras	India by 4 wickets
Test 709	25–30 January	Ajit Wadekar	Tony Lewis	Green Park, Kanpur	Match drawn
Test 711	6–11 February	Ajit Wadekar	Tony Lewis	Brabourne Stadium, Bombay	Match drawn

=== Pakistan in Australia ===
Test series
No.	Date	Home captain	Away captain	Venue	Result
Test 704	22–27 December	Ian Chappell	Intikhab Alam	Adelaide Oval, Adelaide	Australia by an innings and 114 runs
Test 705	29 Dec–3 January	Ian Chappell	Intikhab Alam	Melbourne Cricket Ground, Melbourne	Australia by 92 runs
Test 707	6–11 January	Ian Chappell	Intikhab Alam	Sydney Cricket Ground, Sydney	Australia by 52 runs

== February ==
=== Pakistan in New Zealand ===
Test series
No.	Date	Home captain	Away captain	Venue	Result
Test 710	2–5 February	Bevan Congdon	Intikhab Alam	Basin Reserve, Wellington	Match drawn
Test 712	7–10 February	Bevan Congdon	Intikhab Alam	Carisbrook, Dunedin	Pakistan by an innings and 166 runs
Test 713	16–19 February	Bevan Congdon	Intikhab Alam	Eden Park, Auckland	Match drawn
One-off ODI Series
No.	Date	Home captain	Away captain	Venue	Result
ODI 5	11 February	Bevan Congdon	Intikhab Alam	AMI Stadium, Christchurch	New Zealand by 22 runs

=== Australia in the West Indies ===
Frank Worrell Trophy Test Series
No.	Date	Home captain	Away captain	Venue	Result
Test 714	16–21 February	Rohan Kanhai	Ian Chappell	Sabina Park, Kingston	Match drawn
Test 716	9–14 March	Rohan Kanhai	Ian Chappell	Kensington Oval, Bridgetown	Match drawn
Test 718	23–28 March	Rohan Kanhai	Ian Chappell	Queen's Park Oval, Port of Spain	Australia by 44 runs
Test 720	6–11 April	Rohan Kanhai	Ian Chappell	Bourda, Georgetown	Australia by 10 wickets
Test 721	21–26 April	Rohan Kanhai	Ian Chappell	Queen's Park Oval, Port of Spain	Match drawn

== March ==
=== England in Pakistan ===
Test series
No.	Date	Home captain	Away captain	Venue	Result
Test 715	2–7 March	Majid Khan	Tony Lewis	Gaddafi Stadium, Lahore	Match drawn
Test 717	16–21 March	Majid Khan	Tony Lewis	Niaz Stadium, Hyderabad, Sindh	Match drawn
Test 719	24–29 March	Majid Khan	Tony Lewis	National Stadium, Karachi	Match drawn
