= Ganesar Chanmugam =

Sri Lankan astrophysicist

Professor Ganesar Chanmugam (1939–1996) was a Sri Lankan astrophysicist.

== Biography ==
Ganesar Chanmugam was born in Colombo, Sri Lanka (then Ceylon) on 24 October 1939. He received his early education first in high school at the Royal College in Colombo, then at the University of Ceylon (Colombo), where he was awarded a BSc with honors in mathematics in 1961. He then moved to England where he received a BA in mathematics with honors from Downing College, Cambridge in 1963. He was an instructor in physics at the University of Massachusetts from 1963 to 1964, when he left to complete his graduate training at Brandeis University, receiving a PhD in physics in 1970. His work focused on the equation of state of nuclear matter in neutron stars. The asteroid 16107 Chanmugam is named for him.

Professor Chanmugam was a research fellow at the Institut d'Astrophysique in Liège, Belgium from 1969 to 1971. Thereafter, with the exception of summer and sabbatical leaves at MIT, the Space Telescope Science Institute, NASA Goddard Space Fight Center, the Max-Planck-Institut fur Astrophysik (Garching) and over a dozen other major research institutions throughout the world, he taught and carried on his research in astrophysics at Louisiana State University for the next 25 years. His extraordinary contributions to LSU were honored by a new Chanmugam Memorial Fund to support research and education activities in physics and astronomy at LSU.

Author of over 110 scientific papers, presenter of dozens of papers at national and international scientific meetings, Professor Chanmugam was a Fellow of the American Physical Society and of the Royal Astronomical Society (London) as well as the International Astronomical Union and American Astronomical Society. During his life of research, He established an international reputation as one of the world's leading experts on the physics of white dwarfs and of neutron stars. His earliest scientific work focused on the properties of nuclear three-body forces and the equations of state in neutron star matter. He then turned his attention to a wide variety of neutron star problems concerning their electromagnetic properties, their dynamical stability, superfluid effects on their structure and properties of low density neutron stars. Throughout his career he conducted outstanding studies of the magnetic properties of neutron stars and white dwarfs. His penetrating physical insight and use of sophisticated mathematical analysis resulted in some of the deepest insights to date into the magnetic properties of degenerate matter. Some of this work focused on the origin of neutron star and white dwarf magnetic fields. Other studies focused on the effects these magnetic fields have on collapsed star radiation properties, including: cyclotron emission; gamma-ray emission from neutron stars and pulsars; magnetic models of gamma-ray bursts; effects of accretion on the magnetic fields of degenerate stars.
