= International cricket in 1976–77 =

International cricket season

The 1976–77 international cricket season was from September 1976 to April 1977.

== Season overview ==
International tours
Start date	Home team	Away team	Results [Matches]			
Start date	Home team	Away team	Test	ODI	FC	LA
9 October 1976	Pakistan	New Zealand	2–0 [3]	0–1 [1]	—	—
10 November 1976	India	New Zealand	2–0 [3]	—	—	—
17 December 1976	India	England	1–3 [5]	—	—	—
24 December 1976	Australia	Pakistan	1–1 [3]	—	—	—
18 February 1977	New Zealand	Australia	0–1 [2]	—	—	—
18 February 1977	West Indies	Pakistan	2–1 [5]	1–0 [1]	—	—
12 March 1977	Australia	England	1–0 [1]	—	—	—

== October ==
=== New Zealand in Pakistan ===
Test series
No.	Date	Home captain	Away captain	Venue	Result
Test 782	9–13 October	Mushtaq Mohammad	Glenn Turner	Gaddafi Stadium, Lahore	Pakistan by 6 wickets
Test 783	23–27 October	Mushtaq Mohammad	Glenn Turner	Niaz Stadium, Hyderabad, Sindh	Pakistan by 10 wickets
Test 784	30 Oct–4 November	Mushtaq Mohammad	John Parker	National Stadium, Karachi	Match drawn
ODI series
No.	Date	Home captain	Away captain	Venue	Result
ODI 40	16 October	Mushtaq Mohammad	Glenn Turner	Jinnah Stadium, Sialkot	New Zealand by 1 run

== November ==
=== New Zealand in India ===
Test series
No.	Date	Home captain	Away captain	Venue	Result
Test 785	10–15 November	Bishan Singh Bedi	Glenn Turner	Wankhede Stadium, Bombay	India by 162 runs
Test 786	18–23 November	Bishan Singh Bedi	Glenn Turner	Green Park Stadium, Kanpur	Match drawn
Test 787	26 Nov–2 December	Bishan Singh Bedi	Glenn Turner	MA Chidambaram Stadium, Madras	India by 216 runs

== December ==
=== England in India ===
Test series
No.	Date	Home captain	Away captain	Venue	Result
Test 788	17–22 December	Bishan Singh Bedi	Tony Greig	Feroz Shah Kotla Ground, Delhi	England by an innings and 25 runs
Test 791	1–6 January	Bishan Singh Bedi	Tony Greig	Eden Gardens, Calcutta	England by 10 wickets
Test 793	14–19 January	Bishan Singh Bedi	Tony Greig	MA Chidambaram Stadium, Madras	England by 200 runs
Test 794	28 Jan–2 February	Bishan Singh Bedi	Tony Greig	Karnataka State Cricket Association Stadium, Bangalore	India by 140 runs
Test 795	11–16 February	Bishan Singh Bedi	Tony Greig	Wankhede Stadium, Bombay	Match drawn

=== Pakistan in Australia ===
Test Series
No.	Date	Home captain	Away captain	Venue	Result
Test 789	24–29 December	Greg Chappell	Mushtaq Mohammad	Adelaide Oval, Adelaide	Match drawn
Test 790	1–6 January	Greg Chappell	Mushtaq Mohammad	Melbourne Cricket Ground, Melbourne	Australia by 348 runs
Test 792	14–18 January	Greg Chappell	Mushtaq Mohammad	Sydney Cricket Ground, Sydney	Pakistan by 8 wickets

== February ==
=== Australia in New Zealand ===
Test Series
No.	Date	Home captain	Away captain	Venue	Result
Test 796	18–23 February	Glenn Turner	Greg Chappell	AMI Stadium, Christchurch	Match drawn
Test 798	25 Feb–1 March	Glenn Turner	Greg Chappell	Eden Park, Auckland	Australia by 10 wickets

=== Pakistan in the West Indies ===
Test series
No.	Date	Home captain	Away captain	Venue	Result
Test 797	18–23 February	Clive Lloyd	Mushtaq Mohammad	Kensington Oval, Bridgetown	Match drawn
Test 799	4–9 March	Clive Lloyd	Mushtaq Mohammad	Queen's Park Oval, Port of Spain	West Indies by 6 wickets
Test 801	18–23 March	Clive Lloyd	Mushtaq Mohammad	Bourda, Georgetown	Match drawn
Test 802	1–6 April	Clive Lloyd	Mushtaq Mohammad	Queen's Park Oval, Port of Spain	Pakistan by 266 runs
Test 803	15–20 April	Clive Lloyd	Mushtaq Mohammad	Sabina Park, Kingston	West Indies by 140 runs
Guinness Trophy ODI Match
No.	Date	Home captain	Away captain	Venue	Result
ODI 41	16 March	Clive Lloyd	Asif Iqbal	Albion Sports Complex, Albion	West Indies by 4 wickets

== March ==
=== England in Australia ===
Centenary Test Match
No.	Date	Home captain	Away captain	Venue	Result
Test 800	12–17 March	Greg Chappell	Tony Greig	Melbourne Cricket Ground, Melbourne	Australia by 45 runs
