= Mohotti Albert =

Sri Lankan cricketer

Personal information
- Full name: Mohotti Kankanange Albert
- Born: 10 April 1895; Kalutara, Ceylon
- Died: 1944 (aged 48 or 49); Ceylon
- Batting: Right-handed
- Bowling: Right-arm medium-pace

Career statistics
Competition	First-class
Matches	11
Runs scored	515
Batting average	24.52
100s/50s	0/2
Top score	66
Balls bowled	138
Wickets	0
Bowling average	–
5 wickets in innings	–
10 wickets in match	–
Best bowling	–
Catches/stumpings	4/–
- Source: Cricinfo, 28 September 2017

Mohotti Kankanange Albert (10 September 1895 – 1944) was a cricketer who played first-class cricket for Ceylon from 1926 to 1934.

A right-handed opening batsman with an unorthodox style and limitless patience, Mohotti Albert was one of Ceylon's leading batsmen in the 1920s and early 1930s. In 1925 he set a record for the annual match between the Europeans and the Ceylonese, one of the major domestic matches in Ceylon at the time, scoring 175 for the Ceylonese; he broke his own record in 1929 by scoring 188.

Albert made his highest first-class score when he scored 66 and 42 for Dr J Rockwood's Ceylonese XI against the touring Maharaj Kumar of Vizianagram's XI in 1930–31. He toured India in 1932-33 on Ceylon's first tour, scoring 227 runs in five matches at an average of 22.70.

Albert worked in the Audit Department of Ceylon Government Railways.
