= Hilton Poulier =

Sri Lankan cricketer

Personal information
- Full name: Hilton E. Poulier
- Born: 1909; Ceylon
- Died: 6 May 1979 (aged 69 or 70); Melbourne, Australia
- Batting: Right-handed
- Bowling: Right-arm fast-medium

Career statistics
Competition	First-class
Matches	7
Runs scored	129
Batting average	18.42
100s/50s	0/1
Top score	53 not out
Balls bowled	1201
Wickets	24
Bowling average	18.29
5 wickets in innings	2
10 wickets in match	0
Best bowling	5/17
Catches/stumpings	5/–
- Source: Cricinfo, 1 January 2018

Hilton Poulier (1909 – 6 May 1979) was a cricketer who played on Ceylon's first tour in 1932–33.

He attended Royal College, Colombo, and played for Burgher Recreation Club in Colombo as a right-arm fast-medium bowler and useful lower-order batsman. On his first-class debut, for Dr J. Rockwood's Ceylon XI in December 1929, he took 5 for 17 and 3 for 29 in the victory over J. D. Antia's Bombay XI in Colombo.

He took part in Ceylon's tour of India in 1932-33, when he was the team's main pace bowler, taking 14 wickets at an average of 24.21 in the five first-class matches. Reporting on the tour in The Cricketer, the Indian journalist I. M. Mansukhani noted that "Poulier was their fast bowler, but his length was imperfect". He took five wickets and top-scored in the second innings with 53 not out – batting at number 10 – when Ceylon beat Central Provinces and Berar.

He lost the middle finger of his right hand as the result of an accident at work for the Harbour Engineer's Department in 1937. He was never quite the same player afterwards.
