= Neil Chanmugam =

Sri Lankan cricketer

Personal information
- Full name: Dunkirk Neilendran Chanmugam
- Born: 13 May 1940; Colombo, Ceylon
- Died: 22 April 2014 (aged 73); Colombo, Sri Lanka
- Batting: Right-handed
- Bowling: Right-arm off-spin
- Relatives: Dennis Chanmugam (brother); Dipika Chanmugam (daughter)

Career statistics
Competition	First-class
Matches	21
Runs scored	593
Batting average	17.44
100s/50s	0/1
Top score	72
Balls bowled	3488
Wickets	55
Bowling average	26.32
5 wickets in innings	1
10 wickets in match	0
Best bowling	5/47
Catches/stumpings	13/–
- Source: ESPNcricinfo, 17 February 2019

Neil Chanmugam (13 May 1940 – 22 April 2014) was a Sri Lankan cricketer. He played first-class cricket for Ceylon and domestic teams in Sri Lanka between 1960 and 1974.

Chanmugam was educated at S. Thomas' College, Mount Lavinia, and the University of Colombo. He was an off-spin bowler and useful lower-order batsman who toured India with the Ceylon team in 1964-65 and Pakistan in 1966-67. His best first-class bowling figures were 5 for 47 and 3 for 43 in the drawn match against the touring Australians in October 1969, when he dismissed Bill Lawry twice. His highest score was 72 against the West Indians in January 1967, when he and Ian Pieris took Ceylon's first innings score from 290 for 9 to 400 all out.

Chanmugam was also a keen golfer. He served as the manager of the Sri Lankan cricket teams to England in 1984 and Australia in 1984-85.

He was the director of a television company in Sri Lanka and the director of tea exports at Maharajahs Ltd. He married Oosha de Saram, the daughter of the Ceylon cricket captain Fredrick de Saram, and they had three children.
