= International cricket in 1968–69 =

International cricket season

The 1968–69 international cricket season was from September 1968 to April 1969.

== Season overview ==
International tours
Start date	Home team	Away team	Results [Matches]			
Start date	Home team	Away team	Test	ODI	FC	LA
6 December 1968	Australia	West Indies	3–1 [5]	—	—	—
30 January 1969	Ceylon	M.C.C.	—	—	0–0 [1]	—
21 February 1969	Pakistan	England	0–0 [3]	—	—	—
27 February 1969	New Zealand	West Indies	1–1 [3]	—	—	—
8 March 1969	India	Ceylon	—	—	0–0 [1]	—

== December ==
=== West Indies in Australia ===
Frank Worrell Trophy Test series
No.	Date	Home captain	Away captain	Venue	Result
Test 642	6–10 December	Bill Lawry	Garfield Sobers	The Gabba, Brisbane	West Indies by 125 runs
Test 643	26–30 December	Bill Lawry	Garfield Sobers	Melbourne Cricket Ground, Melbourne	Australia by an innings and 30 runs
Test 644	3–8 January	Bill Lawry	Garfield Sobers	Sydney Cricket Ground, Sydney	Australia by 10 wickets
Test 645	24–29 January	Bill Lawry	Garfield Sobers	Adelaide Oval, Adelaide	Match drawn
Test 646	14–20 February	Bill Lawry	Garfield Sobers	Sydney Cricket Ground, Sydney	Australia by 383 runs

== January ==
=== MCC in Sri Lanka ===
First-class match
No.	Date	Home captain	Away captain	Venue	Result
FC Match	30 Jan–1 February	Buddy Reid	Colin Cowdrey	P. Saravanamuttu Stadium, Colombo	Match drawn

== February ==
=== England in Pakistan ===
Test series
No.	Date	Home captain	Away captain	Venue	Result
Test 647	21–24 February	Colin Cowdrey	Saeed Ahmed	Lahore Stadium, Lahore	Match drawn
Test 649	28 Feb–3 March	Colin Cowdrey	Saeed Ahmed	Dacca Stadium, Dhaka	Match drawn
Test 650	6–10 March	Colin Cowdrey	Saeed Ahmed	National Stadium, Karachi	Match drawn

=== West Indies in New Zealand ===
Test series
No.	Date	Home captain	Away captain	Venue	Result
Test 648	27 Feb–3 March	Graham Dowling	Garfield Sobers	Eden Park, Auckland	West Indies by 5 wickets
Test 651	7–11 March	Graham Dowling	Garfield Sobers	Basin Reserve, Wellington	New Zealand by 6 wickets
Test 652	13–17 March	Graham Dowling	Garfield Sobers	Lancaster Park, Christchurch	Match drawn

== March ==
=== Ceylon in India ===
MJ Gopalan Trophy
No.	Date	Home captain	Away captain	Venue	Result
FC Match	8–10 March	Patamada Belliappa	DMA Weerasinghe	Kajamalai Stadium, Tiruchi	Match drawn
