= Sargo Jayawickreme =

Personal information
- Full name: Sagaradaththa Sudirikku Jayawickreme
- Born: 10 January 1911; Galle, Ceylon
- Died: 15 February 1983 (aged 72); Colombo, Sri Lanka
- Batting: Right-handed
- Bowling: Right-arm medium-pace

Career statistics
Competition	First-class
Matches	28
Runs scored	1254
Batting average	25.59
100s/50s	2/6
Top score	138
Balls bowled	2561
Wickets	27
Bowling average	40.22
5 wickets in innings	1
10 wickets in match	0
Best bowling	5/58
Catches/stumpings	16/–
- Source: Cricinfo, 20 September 2017

Sagaradaththa Sudirikku "Sargo" Jayawickreme MBE, also spelled Jayawickrema (10 January 1911 – 15 February 1983) was a cricketer who represented Ceylon in first-class cricket from 1932 to 1950, captaining the team in the 1940s.

== Life and career ==
A middle-order batsman and medium-pace bowler, Sargo Jayawickreme attended Royal College, Colombo, and played in the Royal–Thomian cricket match four times, captaining Royal College to victory in his final year, 1930. After leaving school he worked in the Rubber Control Department and joined Sinhalese Sports Club.

He was one of the youngest of the Ceylon team that toured India in 1932-33, and was the leading batsman on the tour, with 421 runs at an average of 46.77; he also took 15 wickets at 25.53. He began the tour by taking 5 for 58 and 2 for 30 on his first-class debut in the opening match against Sind. He scored 130 in the second of the two matches against India, when he rescued the innings from 86 for 5 to 305 all out. Reporting on the tour in The Cricketer, the Indian journalist I. M. Mansukhani thought Jayawickreme the most impressive of the Ceylonese batsmen, with “a wide and delightful range of strokes”.

Jayawickreme captained Ceylon on its next two tours: to India in 1940-41 and to Pakistan in 1949-50. In the first of the two matches against India in 1940-41 he scored 138 in just over three hours after Ceylon had been 24 for 3.

He was also invited to play several first-class matches in India, including matches for The Rest in the Bombay Pentangular in 1937-38 and 1944–45.

In all cricket he scored 56 centuries. He was awarded the MBE for services to cricket. He and his wife had two daughters.
