= Weightlifting at the 2003 Afro-Asian Games =

Weightlifting was a main sport in the 2003 Afro-Asian Games held in Hyderabad, India from 25 - 31 October 2003. The Afro-Asian Games were an inter-continental, multi-sport competition held between nations in the continents of Africa and Asia. The inaugural edition was hosted by Hyderabad in 2003. The weightlifting events took place at the 2,000-capacity Kotla Vijay Bhaskar Reddy Indoor Stadium, with fifteen individual weight classes. It featured both men's and women's categories, with weight classes ranging between 48 kg and 105+ kg. Athletes from China bagged gold medals in seven categories. This was the last edition of the Games, as the 2007 event (to be held in Algiers, Algeria) was indefinitely postponed.

== Qualification ==
Qualification for the Games depended upon the performance of the countries in other major multi-sport events. Since these Games featured delegations from two continents, the qualification criteria for nations from the different continents was different. The qualification of the African nations was based on their performance in the 2003 All-Africa Games held in Abuja, Nigeria. The qualification for the Asian nations was based on their performance in the 2002 Asian Games held in Busan, South Korea.

== Schedule ==
The weightlifting events took place between 25 - 31 October 2003 at the Kotla Vijay Bhaskar Reddy Indoor Stadium in Hyderabad. Each day featured two slots at 3:00 PM and 5:00 PM, with an additional slot on 31 October for 75+ kg (women) category.

Date	Time	Weight Category	Gender
25 October	1500 hrs	56 kg	M
25 October	Victory ceremony	56 kg	M
25 October	1700 hrs	62 kg	M
25 October	Victory ceremony	62 kg	M
26 October	1500 hrs	69 kg	M
26 October	Victory ceremony	69 kg	M
26 October	1700 hrs	48 kg	F
26 October	Victory ceremony	48 kg	F
27 October	1500 hrs	77 kg	M
27 October	Victory ceremony	77 kg	M
27 October	1700 hrs	53 kg	F
27 October	Victory ceremony	53 kg	F
28 October	1500 hrs	85 kg	M
28 October	Victory ceremony	85 kg	M
28 October	1700 hrs	58 kg	F
28 October	Victory ceremony	58 kg	F
29 October	1500 hrs	94 kg	M
29 October	Victory ceremony	94 kg	M
29 October	1700 hrs	63 kg	F
29 October	Victory ceremony	63 kg	F
30 October	1500 hrs	105 kg	M
30 October	Victory ceremony	105 kg	M
30 October	1700 hrs	69 kg	F
30 October	Victory ceremony	69 kg	F
31 October	1500 hrs	+105 kg	M
31 October	Victory ceremony	+105 kg	M
31 October	1700 hrs	75 kg	F
31 October	Victory ceremony	75 kg	F
31 October	1900 hrs	+75 kg	F
31 October	Victory ceremony	+75 kg	F

== Results ==
Out of the fifteen weight classes, eligible athletes qualified into only eleven classes. The 62 kg (men), 105+ kg (men), 75 kg (women), and 75+ kg (women) did not produce results. Medals were not awarded for these four classes. China won a gold medal in seven of the remaining classes, the highest tally amongst competing nations.

=== Up to 105 kg (Men) ===
Lot No.	Name	Country	Maximum weight lifted (kg)			Points	Rank
Lot No.	Name	Country	Snatch	Clean & Jerk	Total	Points	Rank
45	Cui Wenhua	China	180	185	365	28	1st place, gold medalist(s)
28	Nomofilov Dmitry	Kazakhstan	147.5	195	342.5	25	2nd place, silver medalist(s)
25	A Fouladi Vanda	Iran	155	187.5	342.5	23	3rd place, bronze medalist(s)
11	Augustine N Mathias	Nigeria	145	195	340	22	4
21	Gurminder Singh	India	140	187.5	327.5	21	5
19	Tayeb Boulahia	Algeria	142.5	170	312.5	20	6
54	Salaheddin El Adham	Libya	130	180	310	19	7

=== Up to 69 kg (Women) ===
Lot No.	Name	Country	Maximum weight lifted (kg)			Points	Rank
Lot No.	Name	Country	Snatch	Clean & Jerk	Total	Points	Rank
38	Cao Lei	China	100	140	240	28	1st place, gold medalist(s)
20	Janet Marie Therlemont	Seychelles	95	115	210	25	2nd place, silver medalist(s)
32	Nansita Devi	India	85	110	195	23	3rd place, bronze medalist(s)
18	Supasiri Sanok	Thailand	85	100	185	22	4
27	Irene Ajiambo	Uganda	60	87.5	147.5	21	5
29	Nadia Bouhizeb	Algeria	50	80	130	20	6

=== 58 kg (Women) ===
Lot No.	Name	Country	Maximum weight lifted (kg)			Points	Rank
Lot No.	Name	Country	Snatch	Clean & Jerk	Total	Points	Rank
19	Wang Li	China	105	122.5	227.5	28	1st place, gold medalist(s)
23	Franca Gbodo	Nigeria	95	117.5	212.5	25	2nd place, silver medalist(s)
28	Lin Tsu-Ling	Chinese Taipei	87.5	110	197.5	23	3rd place, bronze medalist(s)
22	Prasmita Magraj	India	87.5	107.5	195.0	22	4
10	Sittirak Nutsara	Thailand	85	105	190.0	21	5
34	Beighandi Wahiba	Algeria	75	95	170.0	20	6
9	Mercy Obiero	Kenya	60	80	140.0	19	7

=== 85 kg (Men) ===
Lot No.	Name	Country	Maximum weight lifted (kg)			Points	Rank
Lot No.	Name	Country	Snatch	Clean & Jerk	Total	Points	Rank
20	Jacob Edward	Nigeria	150	195	345.0	28	1st place, gold medalist(s)
33	Shahrouz Ghorbani	Iran	157.5	185	342.5	25	2nd place, silver medalist(s)
38	Khalmatov Akramzhan	Kazakhstan	145	190	335.0	23	3rd place, bronze medalist(s)
26	Jabad Naderi	Iran	147.5	175	322.5	22	4
50	Hamza Ahmed	Libya	137.5	177.5	315.0	21	5
6	Mohammed Zakir	India	135	175	310.0	20	6
22	Park Jae-Deok	South Korea	132.5	177.5	310.0	19	7
29	Boulahia Madjid	Algeria	135	160	295.0	18	8

=== 94 kg (Men) ===
Lot No.	Name	Country	Maximum weight lifted (kg)			Points	Rank
Lot No.	Name	Country	Snatch	Clean & Jerk	Total	Points	Rank
31	Ali Dehgha niyan	Iran	142.5	190.0	332.5	28	1st place, gold medalist(s)
4	Omid Noidj	Iran	150.0	180.0	330.0	25	2nd place, silver medalist(s)
17	Sedov Sergey	Kazakhstan	152.5	177.5	330.0	23	3rd place, bronze medalist(s)
51	Lee Dal	South Korea	135.0	180.0	315.0	22	4
44	Michal Johnson	Ghana	130.0	175.0	305.0	21	5
15	Mezouar Abdelaziz	Algeria	110.0	140.0	250.0	20	6
3	Mossimbo H	Congo	90.0	115.0	205.0	19	7
32	Menayako Botowa	Congo	82.5	110.0	192.5	18	8
42	Sandeep Gopal Krishn	India	0.0	0.0	0.0	DSQ	9

=== 63 kg (Women) ===
Lot No.	Name	Country	Maximum weight lifted (kg)			Points	Rank
Lot No.	Name	Country	Snatch	Clean & Jerk	Total	Points	Rank
33	Dang Huijia	China	102.5	130	232.5	28	1st place, gold medalist(s)
11	Anike Ruth Ayodaji	Nigeria	90	120	210.0	25	2nd place, silver medalist(s)
7	P Haritha	India	87.5	107.5	195.0	23	3rd place, bronze medalist(s)

=== 56 kg (Men) ===
Lot No.	Name	Country	Maximum weight lifted (kg)			Points	Rank
Lot No.	Name	Country	Clean & Jerk	C & J	Total	Points	Rank
1002	Gbenga Olupona	Nigeria	107.5	140	247.5	28	1st place, gold medalist(s)
1027	V. Srinivasa Rao	India	105	135	240	25	2nd place, silver medalist(s)
1053	Tsai Sheng Fen	Chinese Taipei	90	120	210	23	3rd place, bronze medalist(s)
1052	Obrie Nondo	Zambia	90	117.5	207	22	4
1014	William Andrew Phillips	South Africa	90	110	200	21	5
1048	Moses Kimbowa	Uganda	90	105	195	20	6

=== 69 kg (Men) ===
Lot No.	Name	Country	Maximum weight lifted (kg)			Rank
Lot No.	Name	Country	Snatch	Clean & Jerk	Total	Rank
8	Chen Chufu	China	140	175	315	1st place, gold medalist(s)
7	Suphalak Sitthisak	Thailand	130	162.5	292.5	2nd place, silver medalist(s)
36	C. P. R. Sudhir Kumar	India	135	155	290	3rd place, bronze medalist(s)
49	Su Feixiang	China	125	160	285	4
37	Sayed Reda	Libya	120	150	270	5
34	Nyamuja Badru	Uganda	100	0	100	6

=== 48 kg (Women) ===
Lot No.	Name	Country	Maximum weight lifted (kg)			Points	Rank
Lot No.	Name	Country	Snatch	Clean & Jerk	Total	Points	Rank
5	Jie Xiaomei	China	82.5	105	187.5	28	1st place, gold medalist(s)
6	Joke Elizabeth	Nigeria	72.5	92.5	165	25	2nd place, silver medalist(s)
4	Sandhya Rani	India	70	87.5	157.5	23	3rd place, bronze medalist(s)
14	Portia Charmaine	South Africa	62.5	82.5	145	22	4
25	Achena Dalila	Algeria	55	75	130	21	5

=== 53 kg (Women) ===
Lot No.	Name	Country	Maximum weight lifted (kg)			Rank
Lot No.	Name	Country	Snatch	Clean & Jerk	Total	Rank
17	Lu Meiqin	China	85	115	200	1st place, gold medalist(s)
03	Sonia Chanu	India	77.5	100	177.5	2nd place, silver medalist(s)
21	Patience Lawal	Nigeria	72.5	95	167.5	3rd place, bronze medalist(s)
30	Kauri Safia	Algeria	60	80	140	4
36	Pretorius Mona	South Africa	60	77.5	137.5	5
15	Udomdech Wipawan	Thailand	0	0	0	6

=== 77 kg (Men) ===
Lot No.	Name	Country	Maximum weight lifted (kg)			Rank
Lot No.	Name	Country	Snatch	Clean & Jerk	Total	Rank
30	Dare Alabi	Nigeria	137.5	185	322.5	1st place, gold medalist(s)
46	Satheesha Rai	India	145	177.5	322.5	2nd place, silver medalist(s)
18	Estiwi Mohamed	Libya	135	167.5	302.5	3rd place, bronze medalist(s)
13	Mohmoud E.Z Kenari	Iran	130	167.5	297.5	4
24	Odongo Zak	Kenya	105	140	245	5

== Notes ==
1. Male (men's category)
2. Female (women's category)
3. Disqualified.
