= Churchill Gunasekara =

Sri Lankan cricketer

Personal information
- Full name: Churchill Hector Gunasekara
- Born: 27 July 1894; Colombo, Ceylon
- Died: 16 May 1969 (aged 74); Nawala, Ceylon
- Batting: Right-handed
- Bowling: Right-arm medium
- Role: All-rounder

Domestic team information
- Years: Team
- 1910–1912: Royal College, Colombo
- 1919–1922: Middlesex
- 1927–1935: Ceylon

Career statistics
Competition	First-class
Matches	51
Runs scored	957
Batting average	15.68
100s/50s	0/6
Top score	88*
Balls bowled	6,439
Wickets	90
Bowling average	31.94
5 wickets in innings	4
10 wickets in match	0
Best bowling	5/15
Catches/stumpings	33/–
- Source: CricketArchive, 8 October 2022

Dr Churchill Hector Gunasekara (27 July 1894 – 16 May 1969) was a Ceylonese first-class cricketer. He was the first person from his country to play for an English county, representing Middlesex from 1919 to 1922. He was widely regarded as the best fielder in county cricket at the time.

Gunasekara was educated at Royal College in Colombo where he was captain of the cricket team and achieved colours in both athletics and football. He moved to England in order to study medicine at Cambridge University and excelled again at sports, only missing out on a Blue due to the outbreak of the War.

In 1919 he made his first-class debut for Middlesex and went on to have a good all-round Championship season, with 36 wickets at 27.72 and 351 runs at 21.93. Despite batting at nine, he top scored for Middlesex in the first innings of their match against Surrey at Kennington Oval with 88 not out. His best performance with the ball came against Lancashire where he dismissed their last five batsmen to finish with 5/15.

The following summer he was part of Middlesex's successful campaign for the 1920 County Championship. He didn't play at all in 1921 but returned in 1922 for one final season.

Having completed his degree, Gunasekara returned to Ceylon and became captain of his country's cricket team. He captained Ceylon's first overseas touring team, to India in 1932–33, but was called back to Ceylon during the tour in his capacity as Chief Medical Officer of Health, Colombo Municipality, in order to deal with a smallpox outbreak, and was absent during the two matches against India, when Ed Kelaart captained the team in his absence. He played 10 first-class matches in total for various Ceylonese representative sides and also captained one in a non-first-class fixture against Don Bradman's Australians.

He also represented Ceylon at tennis, playing against the visiting New Zealanders who were on their way to England in 1933 to play in the Davis Cup.

Gunasekara's son Channa and four of his nephews, including C. I. Gunesekera, also played first-class cricket for Ceylon.
