= Inayat Khan (cricketer) =

Pakistani cricketer

Personal information
- Full name: Malik Inayat Khan
- Born: 19 October 1922; Lahore, British India
- Batting: Right-handed
- Bowling: Right-arm fast-medium
- Role: All-rounder

Domestic team information
- Years: Team
- 1943-44 to 1945-46: Muslims
- 1943-44: Northern India
- 1944-45 to 1948-49: Sind
- 1947-48: Punjab

Career statistics
Competition	First-class
Matches	18
Runs scored	734
Batting average	29.36
100s/50s	1/5
Top score	100
Balls bowled	2382
Wickets	19
Bowling average	34.89
5 wickets in innings	0
10 wickets in match	0
Best bowling	3/59
Catches/stumpings	8/–
- Source: ESPNcricinfo, 27 January 2022

Inayat Khan (born 19 October 1922) was a Pakistani cricketer who played first-class cricket from 1941 to 1950, and played for Pakistan in the years before Pakistan played Test cricket.

== Cricket career ==
Khan was born in Lahore. His father Saleh Mohammad played first-class cricket as an all-rounder for Muslims in the Bombay Quadrangular and the Lahore Tournament between 1912 and 1930.

Khan was a right-handed batsman and right-arm fast-medium bowler. He scored his only first-class century, 100 retired out, for North Zone in the Zonal Quadrangular Tournament in February 1946. His captain, the Nawab of Pataudi, declared when Khan reached his hundred, but when both teams had returned to the dressing rooms the umpires pointed out that under the Laws at the time no team could declare on the first day of a three-day game. North Zone had to return to the wicket but Khan and Pataudi, the two not out batsmen, chose to retire. An economical bowler, Khan took figures of 55–29–59–3 for Sind against Bombay in the Ranji Trophy in November 1944.

Khan was selected to play for Pakistan in the first of two matches against Ceylon in March 1950. He scored a duck in the first match, which Pakistan won by an innings, and was not selected for the second. He played no further first-class cricket.
