= Indian cricket team in Ceylon in 1944–45 =

The Indian national cricket team toured Ceylon in March to April 1945 and played five matches including an international against the Ceylon national team. As Ceylon had not then achieved Test status, the international is classified as a first-class match. Played at the Paikiasothy Saravanamuttu Stadium in Colombo, the match was impacted by rain and ended in a draw. India were captained by Vijay Merchant and Ceylon by Sargo Jayawickreme.
