= Vernon Schokman =

Sri Lankan cricketer

Personal information
- Born: 1905; Ceylon
- Died: 1991 (aged 85 or 86); Sri Lanka
- Batting: Left-handed
- Role: Wicket-keeper

Career statistics
Competition	First-class
Matches	10
Runs scored	345
Batting average	24.64
100s/50s	0/1
Top score	62
Balls bowled	–
Wickets	–
Bowling average	–
5 wickets in innings	–
10 wickets in match	–
Best bowling	–
Catches/stumpings	11/9
- Source: CricketArchive, 28 September 2017

Vernon C. Schokman (1905 – 1991) was a cricketer who played first-class cricket for Ceylon from 1929 to 1935.

Schokman attended Trinity College, Kandy. A wicket-keeper and useful batsman, he was Ceylon's principal wicket-keeper in the 1930s. He toured India in 1932-33, when in the six first-class matches he made 256 runs at an average of 25.60 and made his highest score of 62 against Sind, which was also Ceylon's top score for the match.

He also represented Ceylon at rugby against the visiting Māori team in 1926.

He worked for the police force.
