= Don Jayasundera =

Sri Lankan cricketer

Personal information
- Full name: Don Summigen Jayasundera
- Born: 1911; Induruwa, Ceylon
- Died: 11 October 1964 (aged 52 or 53); Sri Lanka
- Bowling: Right-arm fast-medium

Career statistics
Competition	First-class
Matches	6
Runs scored	105
Batting average	21.00
100s/50s	0/0
Top score	47
Balls bowled	822
Wickets	11
Bowling average	31.90
5 wickets in innings	0
10 wickets in match	0
Best bowling	4/33
Catches/stumpings	4/–
- Source: CricketArchive, 7 October 2017

Don Summigen Jayasundera (1911 – 11 October 1964) was a cricketer who played first-class cricket for Ceylon between 1934 and 1942. He toured India in 1940-41.

He was one of Ceylon's fastest bowlers. He took 10 wickets in an innings three times in club cricket in Ceylon, and five hat-tricks. His best first-class figures were 4 for 33 and 2 for 42 in Ceylon's victory over Madras in 1940–41.
