= Swimming at the 1991 South Asian Games =

Swimming at the 1999 South Asian Games

The swimming competition at the 1991 South Asian Federation Games in Colombo, Sri Lanka.

== Result ==
=== Men's events ===
| Event | Gold | | Silver | | Bronze | |
|---|---|---|---|---|---|---|
| 50 m freestyle | | | | | | |
| 100 m freestyle | (India) Sebastian Xavier | 54.23 | (Sri Lanka) Inthikab Sikkander | 55.58 | (Pakistan) Muhammad Maroof | 55.79 |
| 200 m freestyle | (Sri Lanka) Julian Bolling | | (Pakistan) Muhammad Maroof | | | |
| 400 m freestyle | (Sri Lanka) Julian Bolling | | (Pakistan) Bilal Bukhsh | | | |
| 1500 m freestyle | (Sri Lanka) Julian Bolling | | | | | |
| 100 m backstroke | (India) Wilson Cherian | 1:02.68 | (India) Bhanu Sachdeva | 1:03.26 | (Pakistan) Arshad Mehmood | 1:05.45 |
| 200 m backstroke | (India) Bhanu Sachdeva | 2:12.81 | (Pakistan) Arshad Mehmood | | | |
| 100 m breaststroke | | | | | | |
| 200 m breaststroke | | | | | (Pakistan) Ghulam Muhammad | |
| 100 m butterfly | (India) Suresh Kumar | | | | | |
| 200 m butterfly | (Sri Lanka) Julian Bolling | | (Sri Lanka) Ghefari Dulapandan | | | |
| 200 m individual medley | | | | | (Sri Lanka) Ghefari Dulapandan | |
| 400 m individual medley | (Sri Lanka) Julian Bolling | | | | | |
| 4×100 m freestyle relay | India | | Pakistan | | | |
| 4×200 m freestyle relay | Sri Lanka | 8:19.03 | India | 8:23.03 | Pakistan | 8:26.31 |
| 4×100 m medley relay | India | | | | | |

=== Women's events ===
| Event | Gold | | Silver | | Bronze | |
|---|---|---|---|---|---|---|
| 50 m freestyle | (India) Bula Choudhury | 29.29 | | | | |
| 100 m freestyle | (India) Bula Choudhury | | | | | |
| 200 m freestyle | (Sri Lanka) Dipika Chanmugam | 2:20.10 | (India) Sangita Rao | | (India) Archana Patel | |
| 400 m freestyle | (India) Sangita Rao | 4:55.79 | (Sri Lanka) Nilmtni Wickremaratne | 5:03.14 | (India) Urmila Chetteri | 5:09.89 |
| 800 m freestyle | (India) Sangita Rao | 10.06.06 | | | | |
| 100 m backstroke | (Sri Lanka) Dipika Chanmugam | 1:11.07 | (India) Ashima Shetti | | (Sri Lanka) Purnima Sundaresan | |
| 200 m backstroke | (Sri Lanka) Dipika Chanmugam | 2:32.49 | (India) Tashina Singh | 2:42.60 | (Sri Lanka) Purnima Sundaresan | |
| 100 m breaststroke | (Sri Lanka) Dipika Chanmugam | | | | | |
| 200 m breaststroke | (Sri Lanka) Dipika Chanmugam | 2:52.10 | | | | |
| 100 m butterfly | (India) Bula Choudhury | 1:07.09 | | | (Sri Lanka) Purnima Sundaresan | |
| 200 m butterfly | (India) Bula Choudhury | 2:25.55 | (Sri Lanka) R.M. Dhammika | 2:34.50 | (Bangladesh) Dalia Monira Rahman | 3:20.11 |
| 200 m individual medley | (Sri Lanka) Dipika Chanmugam | | | | | |
| 400 m individual medley | (Sri Lanka) Dipika Chanmugam | | | | | |
| 4×100 m freestyle relay | India | 4:22.30 | Sri Lanka | 4:27.76 | Bangladesh | 4:50.52 |
| 4×100 m medley relay | Sri Lanka | 5:28.06 | | | | |
