= Pakistani cricket team in Sri Lanka in 1975–76 =

The Pakistan national cricket team toured Sri Lanka in January 1976 and played six matches including two internationals against the Sri Lankan national cricket team. As Sri Lanka had not then achieved Test status, the internationals are classified as first-class matches. Both games were played at the Paikiasothy Saravanamuttu Stadium in Colombo. Pakistan were captained by Intikhab Alam and Sri Lanka by Anura Tennekoon. Sri Lanka won the first by 4 wickets and Pakistan won the second by 4 wickets
