= Dennis Chanmugam =

Personal information
- Full name: Dennis Ravindran Chanmugam
- Born: 13 August 1948 (age 78); Colombo, Ceylon
- Batting: Right-handed
- Bowling: Right-arm fast-medium
- Relatives: Neil Chanmugam (brother)

Career statistics
Competition	FC	List A
Matches	14	2
Runs scored	180	17
Batting average	11.25	8.50
100s/50s	0/0	0/0
Top score	35	9
Balls bowled	1376	90
Wickets	19	1
Bowling average	41.05	54.00
5 wickets in innings	0	0
10 wickets in match	0	0
Best bowling	4/60	1/23
Catches/stumpings	8/0	1/0
- Source: Cricinfo, 3 June 2018

Dennis Ravindran Chanmugam (born 13 August 1948) is a former cricketer who played first-class cricket for Sri Lanka from 1973 to 1975.

Dennis Chanmugam attended S. Thomas' College, Mount Lavinia, captaining the cricket team in 1967–68. An opening bowler, he played most of his first-class cricket for Sri Lanka on three tours: to Pakistan in 1973-74, to England in 1975 for the World Cup, and to India in 1975-76. Apart from one match against Pakistan in 1973-74 he did not play in the international matches on these tours. His best first-class figures were 3 for 32 and 4 for 60 against Pakistan Universities at Rawalpindi.

In September 2018, he was one of 49 former Sri Lankan cricketers felicitated by Sri Lanka Cricket, to honour them for their services before Sri Lanka became a full member of the International Cricket Council (ICC).

His elder brother Neil Chanmugam played for Sri Lanka between 1960 and 1974.
