= Dipika Chanmugam =

Sri Lankan swimmer

Personal information
- Full name: Dipika Rukshana Chanmugam
- Nationality: Sri Lankan
- Born: 9 March 1972 (age 54)
- Height: 172 cm (5 ft 8 in)
- Weight: 63 kg (139 lb)

Sport
- Sport: Swimming
Medal record
Women's swimming
Representing Sri Lanka
South Asian Games
Gold medal – first place	1991 Colombo	200 m freestyle
Gold medal – first place	1991 Colombo	100 m backstroke
Gold medal – first place	1991 Colombo	200 m backstroke
Gold medal – first place	1991 Colombo	100 m breaststroke
Gold medal – first place	1991 Colombo	200 m breaststroke
Gold medal – first place	1991 Colombo	200 m individual medley
Gold medal – first place	1991 Colombo	400 m individual medley

Dipika Rukshana Chanmugam-Appleton (born 9 March 1972) is a Sri Lankan former swimmer. She competed in three events at the 1988 Summer Olympics. She was the first woman to represent Sri Lanka at the Olympics.

== Early life ==
She is the daughter of Neil Chanmugam and granddaughter of Fredrick de Saram.
