= Ceylonese cricket team in India in 1940–41 =

International cricket tour

The Ceylon cricket team visited India in December 1940 and January 1941. Ceylon did not then have Test status, but two three-day unofficial Tests were played: the first was drawn, and India won the second. The tour also included one other first-class match and two minor matches.

It was the second tour abroad by a Ceylonese team, and one of only two international cricket tours to take place during World War II; the other was the Indian tour to Ceylon in 1944-45.

== The Ceylon team ==
- Sargo Jayawickreme (captain)
- Alexander Gooneratne
- Gerry Gooneratne
- Mervyn Gooneratne
- Don Jayasundera
- Mervyn Kelaart
- Louis Mendis
- Ben Navaratne
- Bill Porritt
- John Pulle
- Harry Roberts
- Ranny Solomons
- Abdul Wahid

Jayawickreme and Kelaart were the only members of the party that had taken part in Ceylon's previous tour in 1932-33.

Wahid, an opening batsman and left-arm spin bowler who played for Moors Sports Club in Colombo, played only in the two minor matches, and never played first-class cricket.

== The tour ==
The tour began with a victory for Ceylon over Madras. The first international match, against an Indian team consisting mostly of players from Bengal, followed in Calcutta; it was drawn after Ceylon had taken a first-innings lead of 121 thanks to an innings of 138 by Jayawickreme. In the second international match three days later in Bombay, India fielded an entirely different team, which overwhelmed Ceylon by an innings and 110 runs. Two minor matches followed; both were drawn.
