= Ceylonese cricket team in India in 1932–33 =

International cricket tour

The Ceylon cricket team toured India in December 1932 and January 1933. Ceylon did not then have Test status, but two three-day unofficial Tests were played, both of which were drawn. The tour also included four other first-class matches and four minor matches. It was the first tour abroad by a Ceylonese team. The victories against Patiala and Central Provinces and Berar were Ceylon's first victories in first-class matches.

== The Ceylon team ==
- Churchill Gunasekara (captain)
- Ed Kelaart (vice-captain)
- Mohotti Albert
- Laddie Bakelman
- Chippy Gunasekara
- George Hubert
- Sargo Jayawickreme
- Neil Joseph
- Mervyn Kelaart
- Hubert Kelaart
- Bertram Perera
- Hilton Poulier
- Vernon Schokman
- Claude van der Straaten
- Nandadeva Wijeysekera

The team was considered representative of Ceylon's best cricketers at the time, apart from the unavailability of some prominent European cricketers and some players from outside Colombo. Churchill Gunasekara, the captain, was called back to Ceylon during the tour in his capacity as Chief Medical Officer of Health, Colombo Municipality, in order to deal with a smallpox outbreak, and was absent during the two matches against India, when Ed Kelaart captained the team.

== The tour ==
- The tour began with three two-day matches against Bombay, Western India States and Karachi, all of which were drawn.
- Sind v Ceylon, Karachi Gymkhana, Karachi, 13, 14, 15 December 1932. Sind 291 and 193, Ceylon 335 and 92 for 5. Drawn.

Jayawickreme took 5 for 58 and 2 for 30 on his first-class debut; Perera took 1 for 29 and 6 for 51.

- India v Ceylon, Lawrence Gardens, Lahore, 18, 19, 20 December 1932. Ceylon 287 and 201, India 218 and 207 for 7. Drawn.

Mervyn Kelaart scored 101 in the first innings, Ceylon's first international century. For India, Naoomal Jaoomal scored 101 and 32.

- A two-day match against Northern India was drawn.
- Patiala v Ceylon, Baradari Ground, Patiala, 24, 25, 26 December 1932. Ceylon 231 and 122 for 8 declared, Patiala 107 and 183. Ceylon won by 63 runs.

This was Ceylon's first victory in a first-class match. Churchill Gunasekara captained the team, and Bakelman took 6 for 34 and 6 for 65. For Patiala, Amar Singh took 7 for 69 and 2 for 43.

- India v Ceylon, Feroz Shah Kotla, Delhi, 30, 31 December 1932, 1 January 1933. India 373 and 188 for 7 declared, Ceylon 305 and 187 for 9. Drawn.

Needing 257 for victory, Ceylon lost their first six wickets for 83, but were able to hang on for a draw with the last batsmen at the crease, thanks largely to Ed Kelaart's 44 at number eight; he also scored 56 in Ceylon's first innings and took 5 for 95 in India's first innings. Jayawickreme scored 130 in the first innings. For India, Mushtaq Ali took 6 for 97 and 4 for 32. Of the Indian side, only Naoomal Jaoomal had played in the first match.

- Central Provinces and Berar v Ceylon, Central Provinces Gymkhana Ground, Nagpur, 4, 5, 6 January 1933. Ceylon 120 and 220, Central Provinces and Berar 114 and 210. Ceylon won by 16 runs.

Bakelman took 6 for 42 and 5 for 61; Jayawickreme scored 63 and 41 and took 3 for 58 in the second innings.

- Madras v Ceylon, Madras Cricket Club Ground, Madras, 8, 9, 10 January 1933. Ceylon 72 and 243, Madras 225 and 93 for 5. Madras won by five wickets.

Poulier took 5 for 58 in Madras's first innings. For Madras, M. J. Gopalan took 6 for 16, including a hat-trick and four wickets in five balls, and 7 for 57.

India used 21 players in the two international matches, of whom 10 had toured England in 1932. The Yuvraj of Patiala was the captain in the first match, C. K. Nayudu in the second.

== Leading players ==
In the two matches against India, Ed Kelaart made 160 runs at an average of 40.00 and took 11 wickets at 22.36. Jayawickreme was the leading scorer with 212 runs at 53.00, and Bakelman took 11 wickets at 27.09.

For India, Naoomal Jaoomal, the only Indian to play in both matches, scored 252 runs at 84.00. Mushtaq Ali took the most wickets, with 10 at 12.90.

In all first-class matches Jayawickreme was the outstanding batsman, with 421 runs at 46.77; he also took 15 wickets at 25.53. Ed Kelaart made 219 runs at 27.37 and took 20 wickets at 21.45. Bakelman was the outstanding bowler, with 35 wickets at 15.28; he took 23 wickets for 202 in the two victories.
