= Ed Kelaart =

Ceylonese cricketer (1900–1989)

Personal information
- Full name: Edward George Samuel Kelaart
- Born: 30 December 1900; Colombo, Ceylon
- Died: 13 October 1989 (aged 88); Melbourne, Australia
- Batting: Left-handed
- Bowling: Right-arm off-spin
- Relatives: Mervyn Kelaart (brother); Ernie Kelaart (nephew)

Career statistics
Competition	First-class
Matches	18
Runs scored	670
Batting average	25.76
100s/50s	1/3
Top score	101
Balls bowled	3532
Wickets	60
Bowling average	22.41
5 wickets in innings	2
10 wickets in match	0
Best bowling	5/17
Catches/stumpings	25/–
- Source: CricketArchive, 18 September 2017

Edward George Samuel Kelaart (30 December 1900 – 13 October 1989) was a Ceylonese cricketer who played first-class cricket between 1926 and 1935. He was Ceylon's first international captain, leading the side in two matches against India in 1932-33.

== Cricket career ==
On his debut for Ceylon, in a one-day match against the touring MCC in 1922–23, Kelaart scored the first-ever fifty for Ceylon against an MCC team. When the Australians played a one-day match in Colombo in 1929–30, he took 6 for 65 with his off-spin.

After appearing for Ceylonese teams in Ceylon against the touring Maharajkumar of Vizianagram's XI in 1930–31, he joined the Maharajkumar's team for some of its matches in India later that season. In the victory over Madras he was the outstanding player, making 101 and 26 and taking 3 for 30 and 4 for 11. The Maharajkumar tried unsuccessfully to persuade the Indian selectors to include him in India's touring team to England in 1932.

He was vice-captain of Ceylon's first touring team, which toured India in 1932-33, and was one of the most successful players on the tour. He led the side in the two matches against India, Ceylon's first matches against another country. In the first match, which was drawn, his younger brother Mervyn scored Ceylon's first international century.

He was described in 1933 as “the best all-round cricketer in Ceylon for many years, and the most brilliant slip fieldsman Ceylon has ever had”. In a first-class match in Colombo for an India and Ceylon XI against the touring MCC in 1933-34 he took 2 for 22 and 5 for 17.

== Personal life ==
He also represented Ceylon at hockey.

He married Estelle Alexandra Oorloff in Colombo in August 1925. They had one son. In later life they moved to Australia.
