= Fredrick de Saram =

Sri Lankan lawyer, cricket captain, and military officer

Fredrick Cecil de Saram OBE ED
- de Saram in 1947
- Born: 5 September 1912; Colombo, Ceylon
- Died: 11 April 1983 (aged 70); Colombo, Sri Lanka
- Military career
- Allegiance: Sri Lanka
- Branch: Ceylon Army, Ceylon Defence Force
- Service years: 1939 - 1961
- Rank: Colonel
- Nicknames: Derek, Derrick
- Service number: O/50003
- Unit: Ceylon Artillery
- Commands: Ceylon Volunteer Force, 2nd (Volunteer) Coastal Artillery Regiment, 1st Heavy Anti-Aircraft/Coastal Artillery Regiment
- Conflicts: World War II
- Awards: OBE (Military Division), Efficiency Decoration
- Other work: Barrister, Proctor
- Cricket career

Cricket information
- Batting: Right-handed

Domestic team information
- Years: Team
- 1933–1936: Hertfordshire
- 1934–1935: Oxford University

Career statistics
Competition	First-class
Matches	40
Runs scored	2789
Batting average	38.84
100s/50s	6/13
Top score	208
Balls bowled	114
Wickets	0
Bowling average	–
5 wickets in innings	–
10 wickets in match	–
Best bowling	–
Catches/stumpings	17/–
- Source: CricketArchive, 23 October 2015

Colonel Frederick Cecil "Derek" de Saram, OBE, ED (5 September 1912 – 11 April 1983) was a Sri Lankan lawyer, a Ceylon cricket captain, and an officer of the Ceylon Army. He led the attempted military coup of 1962.

== Early life and education ==
Born to a family of lawyers, his father was Frederick de Saram, a proctor and notary public and his mother was Myra Loos, daughter of Frederick Charles Loos, a proctor and unofficial member of Legislative Council of Ceylon. The de Saram family was a prominent family in Dutch Ceylon and British Ceylon having served as native headmen and had established links to other leading low country families in the island such as the Dias-Bandaranaikes and the Obeysekeres. His grandfather Richard Francis de Saram, founded the law firm D. L. & F. de Saram in 1898 which was taken over by his father and uncle Douglas de Saram.

Educated at Royal College, Colombo, where he was head prefect, the captained the college cricket team in the Royal–Thomian and won the coveted Dornhorst Memorial Prize. He then entered Keble College, Oxford in 1932, where he earned Blues in cricket and tennis (he was later runner-up in the 1939 Ceylon tennis championships to Hildon Sansoni). He was captain of the university cricket team. He returned to Ceylon in 1937, having qualified as a barrister and became an advocate starting his legal practice in the unofficial bar. Some years later, become a proctor and notary public, becoming a partner in the family firm, D. L. & F. de Saram. In 1939 he was elected to the executive committee of the Ceylon National Congress along with J. R. Jayewardene among others.

== Cricket career ==
A right-handed batsman, de Saram made 128 playing for Oxford University against the Australians in 1934. The Australian side included Stan McCabe, Chuck Fleetwood-Smith and Clarrie Grimmett. In his 40 first-class games for Ceylon and Oxford University, de Saram made 2789 runs at an average of 39.84 with six centuries and a highest score of 208. He captained the Ceylon cricket team from 1949 to 1954. He was appointed a Member of the Order of the British Empire (MBE) (Civil Division) in the 1949 King's Birthday honours for his service to sport. In later years he coached his alma mater, Royal College Colombo in Cricket. He was also actively involved with S. Thomas' College, Mount Lavinia, and was conferred the status of being an honorary Thomian. He was cricket coach for Royal College Colombo, when his son, D. A. de Saram, played for St Thomas' as a coloursman at the Royal Thomian Cricket encounter.

== Military service ==
=== Ceylon Defence Force ===
De Saram was commissioned as a second lieutenant in the 1st (Heavy) Regiment, Ceylon Garrison Artillery (CGA) in 1939 and served in the personal staff of the British Governor of Ceylon as an Extra Aide-de-Camp. He was mobilized for war service gaining rapid promotion with the expansion of the Ceylon Defence Force during World War II. In 1942, he was deployed with the 2nd Heavy Anti-Aircraft Regiment to defend the vital Royal Navy base at Trincomalee. de Saram was a battery commander of the anti-aircraft batteries deployed at Diamond Hill, Hoodstower and he personally commanded the Ostenberg anti-aircraft battery which provided air defence of Trincomalee during the Japanese attack on Trincomalee on 9 April 1942. With the prospect of a Japanese invasion of Ceylon, he was approached by British Intelligence to serve with their underground should Ceylon fall to the Japanese in 1942. In 1946 as a Major, de Saram served on the staff of the Governor of Ceylon as an Extra Aide-de-camp to the Governor and was promoted to the rank of lieutenant colonel.

=== Ceylon Army ===
With Ceylon gaining independence in 1948 as the Dominion of Ceylon, the Ceylon Army was formed on 1 October 1949. Having attended the Long Gunnery Staff Course at the Royal School of Artillery and qualified as an instructor in Gunnery (IG), Lieutenant Colonel de Saram transferred to the regular force and took command of one of the first two combat units formed in the new Ceylon Army as the first commanding officer, 1st Heavy Anti-Aircraft/Coast Artillery Regiment which became the first regular regiment of the Ceylon Artillery. The other regular combat regiment of the Ceylon Army was the Ceylon Infantry Regiment under the command of Lieutenant Colonel Winston Wijeyekoon. With much of the personal from the CGA transferred to the 2nd (Volunteer) Coastal Artillery / Anti-Aircraft Regiment, he was tasked with establishing the a regular artillery regiment to take over the air defense and coastal artillery role from the Royal Artillery. He was deployed with his regiment during the 1953 Ceylonese Hartal to control civil unrest. On 1 May 1954, de Saram retired from the regular force, transferred to the volunteer force and became the commanding officer, 2nd (Volunteer) Coast Artillery Regiment. In May 1958, the Ceylon Volunteer Force was mobilized to assist the police to suppress rioting during the 1958 Ceylonese riots. Lt. Colonel de Saram lead a detachment opening fire on an armed mod near the Ceylon Transport Board depot at Ratmalana. Promoted to colonel, he was appointed as the deputy commandant of the Ceylon Volunteer Force in 1960.

== Coup ==
De Saram was a member of the Christian elite that saw a gradual erosion of their influence and position in the country following the Sinhalaisation process started by de Saram's cousin, S.W.R.D. Bandaranaike, and carried on by Sirimavo Bandaranaike. Thus, de Saram, along with several other disgruntled Christian officers of the army, navy and police, began to plot a coup along the lines of that waged by General Ayub Khan in Pakistan.

The coup d'état was planned for midnight on 27 January 1962 under the leadership of de Saram with the support of troops from the Ceylon Artillery and Ceylon Armoured Corps as well as several other volunteer units. The plan was the detain the Prime Minister Sirimavo Bandaranaike at Temple Trees, the official residence of the prime minister, and round up government ministers, the Permanent Secretary for Defence and External affairs, the Inspector General of Police, DIG (CID), SP (CID), the Acting Navy Commander, and the Army Commander. Colombo would be placed under curfew and cut off from regular army units from the Panagoda Cantonment. After the coup members gained control, de Saram as General Officer Commanding Ceylon would command all military establishments and have Governor-General of Ceylon, Sir Oliver Goonetilleke dissolve parliament.

However, an officer, who had been brought in on the plot the morning of the set date, warned the government and several of the plotters were arrested. de Saram drove to Temple Trees alone, but there he was arrested. Since no actual coup had taken place, the government had no real evidence to use to punish the accused and thus confined them to solitary confinement in hope of getting a confession. de Saram confessed taking sole responsibility of the coup. This would go on to become the prosecution's main article of evidence. On 3 June 1963, de Saram was convicted along with 11 of the other 24 accused to 10 years in jail as well confiscation of property after laws had been specially modified by the government in order to convict the plotters. The conviction was eventually overruled on appeal to the Judicial Committee of the Privy Council, which ruled that the new Act had denied the right to a fair trial.

== Later life ==
De Saram spent much of the 1970s as a partner of DL and F de Saram and coaching the Royal College, Colombo cricket and rugby teams. He died on 11 April 1983 at age 70.

== Family ==
De Saram married Nedra Obeysekera, daughter of Stanley Obeysekere. They had three daughters, Tara, Rhunie and Oosha and a son, Dijen. Tara and Oosha both excelled in sports at a national level, Tara in swimming and Oosha in both swimming and tennis. Julian Bolling and Dipika Chanmugam are de Saram's grandchildren.

== Honors and decorations ==
For his military service he was made an Officer of the Order of the British Empire (OBE) (Military Division) in the 1950 King's New Year's Honours, having been awarded a Member of the Order of the British Empire (MBE) (Civil Division) in the 1949 King's Birthday honours for his service to sport. He had received the Efficiency Decoration for volunteer service; for wartime service, he had been awarded the Defence Medal and the War Medal 1939–1945, and for service in the Ceylon Army, he received the Ceylon Armed Services Inauguration Medal.
