= 1991 South Asian Games =

V South Asian Games
- Host city: Colombo, Sri Lanka
- Nations: 7
- Events: 10 Sports
- Opening: 22 December
- Closing: 31 December
- Opened by: Ranasinghe Premadasa, President of Sri Lanka
- Main venue: Sugathadasa Stadium

The 1991 South Asian Games (or 5th SAF Games) were held in Colombo, Sri Lanka from 22 December to 31 December 1991.

== Sports ==
- Athletics
- Basketball
- Boxing
- Football
- Shooting (debut)
- Swimming
- Table tennis
- Tennis (debut)
- Volleyball
- Weightlifting

== Medal tally ==
* Host nation (Sri Lanka)

Rank	Nation	Gold	Silver	Bronze	Total
1	India	64	59	41	164
2	Sri Lanka*	44	34	40	118
3	Pakistan	28	32	25	85
4	Bangladesh	4	8	28	40
5	Nepal	2	8	29	39
6	Maldives	0	1	0	1
7	Bhutan	0	0	0	0
Totals (7 entries)		142	142	163	447
