= 2018 Pan Pacific Swimming Championships – Women's 400 metre freestyle =

Women's 400 metre freestyle at the 2018 Pan Pacific Swimming Championships
- Venue: Tokyo Tatsumi International Swimming Center
- Dates: 11 August (heats & finals)
- Competitors: 22 from 8 nations
- Winning time: 3:58.50

Medalists
gold medal	Katie Ledecky	United States
silver medal	Ariarne Titmus	Australia
bronze medal	Leah Smith	United States

The women's 400 metre freestyle competition at the 2018 Pan Pacific Swimming Championships took place on August 11 at the Tokyo Tatsumi International Swimming Center. The defending champion was Katie Ledecky of the United States.

== Records ==
Prior to this competition, the existing world and Pan Pacific records were as follows:

World record	Katie Ledecky (USA)	3:56.46	Rio de Janeiro, Brazil	7 August 2016
Pan Pacific Championships record	Katie Ledecky (USA)	3:58.37	Gold Coast, Australia	23 August 2014

== Results ==
All times are in minutes and seconds.

KEY:	QA	Qualified A Final	QB	Qualified B Final	CR	Championships record	NR	National record	PB	Personal best	SB	Seasonal best

=== Heats ===
The first round was held on 11 August from 10:00.

Only two swimmers from each country may advance to the A or B final. If a country not qualify any swimmer to the A final, that same country may qualify up to three swimmers to the B final.

Rank	Name	Nationality	Time	Notes
1	Katie Ledecky	United States	4:02.57	QA
2	Leah Smith	United States	4:04.91	QA
3	Ariarne Titmus	Australia	4:06.47	QA
4	Allyson McHugh	United States	4:08.72	QB
5	Madeleine Gough	Australia	4:09.09	QA
6	Kiah Melverton	Australia	4:10.07	QB
7	Emily Overholt	Canada	4:10.58	QA
8	Waka Kobori	Japan	4:10.78	QA
9	Katie Drabot	United States	4:11.09	QB
10	Kennedy Goss	Canada	4:13.00	QA
11	Chihiro Igarashi	Japan	4:13.14	QA
12	Allison Schmitt	United States	4:13.52	
13	Mikkayla Sheridan	Australia	4:13.74	QB
14	Erica Sullivan	United States	4:14.68	
15	Zhang Ke	China	4:15.30	QB
16	Mackenzie Padington	Canada	4:16.27	QB
17	Yukimi Moriyama	Japan	4:18.80	QB
18	Nicole Oliva	Philippines	4:21.80	QB
19	Rosalee Santa Ana	Philippines	4:29.13	
20	Gianna Garcia	Philippines	4:50.44	
21	Osisang Chilton	Palau	5:04.43	
22	Mineri Gomez	Guam	5:14.32	

=== B Final ===
The B final was held on 11 August from 18:00.

Rank	Name	Nationality	Time	Notes
9	Kiah Melverton	Australia	4:08.46	
10	Allyson McHugh	United States	4:09.08	
11	Katie Drabot	United States	4:11.09	
12	Mikkayla Sheridan	Australia	4:11.94	
13	Zhang Ke	China	4:12.43	
14	Mackenzie Padington	Canada	4:13.97	
15	Nicole Oliva	Philippines	4:16.32	
16	Yukimi Moriyama	Japan	4:19.00	

=== A Final ===
The A final was held on 11 August from 18:00.

Rank	Name	Nationality	Time	Notes
1st place, gold medalist(s)	Katie Ledecky	United States	3:58.50	
2nd place, silver medalist(s)	Ariarne Titmus	Australia	3:59.66	OC
3rd place, bronze medalist(s)	Leah Smith	United States	4:04.23	
4	Madeleine Gough	Australia	4:08.42	
5	Emily Overholt	Canada	4:08.81	
6	Waka Kobori	Japan	4:09.04	
7	Chihiro Igarashi	Japan	4:11.96	
8	Kennedy Goss	Canada	4:13.25	
