= 2018 Pan Pacific Swimming Championships – Women's 200 metre freestyle =

Women's 200 metre freestyle at the 2018 Pan Pacific Swimming Championships
- Venue: Tokyo Tatsumi International Swimming Center
- Dates: 9 August (heats & finals)
- Competitors: 31 from 9 nations
- Winning time: 1:54.44

Medalists
gold medal	Taylor Ruck	Canada
silver medal	Rikako Ikee	Japan
bronze medal	Katie Ledecky	United States

The women's 200 metre freestyle competition at the 2018 Pan Pacific Swimming Championships took place on August 9 at the Tokyo Tatsumi International Swimming Center. The defending champion was Katie Ledecky of the United States.

== Records ==
Prior to this competition, the existing world and Pan Pacific records were as follows:

World record	Federica Pellegrini (ITA)	1:52.98	Rome, Italy	28 July 2009
Pan Pacific Championships record	Katie Ledecky (USA)	1:55.74	Gold Coast, Australia	21 August 2014

== Results ==
All times are in minutes and seconds.

KEY:	QA	Qualified A Final	QB	Qualified B Final	CR	Championships record	NR	National record	PB	Personal best	SB	Seasonal best

=== Heats ===
The first round was held on 9 August from 10:00.

Only two swimmers from each country may advance to the A or B final. If a country does not qualify any swimmer to the A final, that same country may qualify up to three swimmers to the B final.

Rank	Name	Nationality	Time	Notes
1	Katie Ledecky	United States	1:55.16	QA, CR
2	Allison Schmitt	United States	1:56.36	QA
3	Leah Smith	United States	1:56.81	QB
4	Taylor Ruck	Canada	1:56.84	QA
5	Kathryn McLaughlin	United States	1:56.88	QB
6	Kayla Sanchez	Canada	1:57.39	QA
7	Rikako Ikee	Japan	1:57.43	QA
8	Mallory Comerford	United States	1:57.48	
9	Gabrielle DeLoof	United States	1:57.86	
10	Mikkayla Sheridan	Australia	1:58.05	QA
11	Katie Drabot	United States	1:58.09	
12	Rebecca Smith	Canada	1:58.48	QB
13	Chihiro Igarashi	Japan	1:58.51	QA
14	Madeline Groves	Australia	1:58.80	~~QA~~, WD
15	Tomomi Aoki	Japan	1:58.83	QB
16	Rio Shirai	Japan	1:58.88	QB
17	Brianna Throssell	Australia	1:59.11	QA
18	Abbigail Weitzeil	United States	1:59.30	
19	Kyla Leibel	Canada	2:00.23	QB
20	Kennedy Goss	Canada	2:00.45	
21	Waka Kobori	Japan	2:01.08	
22	Larissa Oliveira	Brazil	2:02.21	QB
23	Nicole Oliva	Philippines	2:02.84	QB
24	McKenna DeBever	Peru	2:03.07	
25	Yui Yamane	Japan	2:03.11	
26	Sayaka Akase	Japan	2:03.24	
27	Rosalee Santa Ana	Philippines	2:07.57	
28	Miranda Renner	Philippines	2:18.50	
29	Gianna Garcia	Philippines	2:19.59	
30	Mineri Gomez	Guam	2:25.78	
31	Osisang Chilton	Palau	2:27.19	

=== B Final ===
The B final was held on 9 August from 17:30.

Rank	Name	Nationality	Time	Notes
9	Kathryn McLaughlin	United States	1:57.34	
10	Rebecca Smith	Canada	1:58.47	
11	Rio Shirai	Japan	1:58.56	
12	Leah Smith	United States	1:58.64	
13	Tomomi Aoki	Japan	1:58.77	
14	Larissa Oliveira	Brazil	1:58.80	
15	Kyla Leibel	Canada	1:59.58	
16	Nicole Oliva	Philippines	2:00.98	

=== A Final ===
The A final was held on 9 August from 17:30.

Rank	Name	Nationality	Time	Notes
1st place, gold medalist(s)	Taylor Ruck	Canada	1:54.44	CR
2nd place, silver medalist(s)	Rikako Ikee	Japan	1:54.85	AS
3rd place, bronze medalist(s)	Katie Ledecky	United States	1:55.15	
4	Allison Schmitt	United States	1:56.71	
5	Kayla Sanchez	Canada	1:57.23	
6	Mikkayla Sheridan	Australia	1:57.48	
7	Chihiro Igarashi	Japan	1:57.83	
8	Brianna Throssell	Australia	1:59.26	
