= 2018 Pan Pacific Swimming Championships – Women's 1500 metre freestyle =

Timed finals in Tokyo

Women's 1500 metre freestyle at the 2018 Pan Pacific Swimming Championships
- Venue: Tokyo Tatsumi International Swimming Center
- Dates: 12 August (timed finals)
- Competitors: 18 from 8 nations
- Winning time: 15:38.97

Medalists
gold medal	Katie Ledecky	United States
silver medal	Kiah Melverton	Australia
bronze medal	Leah Smith	United States

The women's 1500 metre freestyle competition at the 2018 Pan Pacific Swimming Championships took place on August 12 at the Tokyo Tatsumi International Swimming Center. The defending champion was Katie Ledecky of the United States.

This event was a timed-final where each swimmer swam just once. Early heat was swum at the end of the preliminary heats on that day from slowest to fastest. The fastest timed final heat was swum with the finals.

== Records ==
Prior to this competition, the existing world and Pan Pacific records were as follows:

World record	Katie Ledecky (USA)	15:20.48	Indianapolis, United States	16 May 2018
Pan Pacific Championships record	Katie Ledecky (USA)	15:28.36	Gold Coast, Australia	24 August 2014

== Results ==
All times are in minutes and seconds.

KEY:	CR	Championships record	NR	National record	PB	Personal best	SB	Seasonal best

The timed final was held on 12 August from 10:00 to the slowest heats and from 17:30 to the fastest heat.

Only two swimmers from each country was classified in the award ranking.

=== Total ranking ===
Rank	Heat	Name	Nationality	Time	Notes
1	3	Katie Ledecky	United States	15:38.97	
2	3	Kiah Melverton	Australia	16:00.08	
3	2	Leah Smith	United States	16:00.82	
4	3	Kareena Lee	Australia	16:03.26	
5	2	Haley Anderson	United States	16:04.26	
6	2	Madeleine Gough	Australia	16:04.62	
7	3	Ashley Twichell	United States	16:07.49	
8	3	Waka Kobori	Japan	16:14.22	
9	2	Erica Sullivan	United States	16:16.07	
10	2	Allyson McHugh	United States	16:17.29	
11	3	Zhang Ke	China	16:18.55	
12	3	Yukimi Moriyama	Japan	16:20.46	
13	2	Kate Sanderson	Canada	16:33.16	
14	2	Nicole Oliva	Philippines	17:06.99	
15	1	Rosalee Santa Ana	Philippines	17:32.25	
16	1	Osisang Chilton	Palau	20:06.36	
17	1	Mineri Gomez	Guam	20:54.89	
–	2	Hannah Moore	United States	DNS	

=== Award ranking ===
Rank	Name	Nationality	Time	Notes
1st place, gold medalist(s)	Katie Ledecky	United States	15:38.97	
2nd place, silver medalist(s)	Kiah Melverton	Australia	16:00.08	
3rd place, bronze medalist(s)	Leah Smith	United States	16:00.82	
4	Kareena Lee	Australia	16:03.26	
5	Waka Kobori	Japan	16:14.22	
6	Zhang Ke	China	16:18.55	
7	Yukimi Moriyama	Japan	16:20.46	
8	Kate Sanderson	Canada	16:33.16	
