= 2018 Pan Pacific Swimming Championships – Women's 800 metre freestyle =

Women's 800 metre freestyle at the 2018 Pan Pacific Swimming Championships
- Venue: Tokyo Tatsumi International Swimming Center
- Dates: 9 August (timed finals)
- Competitors: 18 from 8 nations
- Winning time: 8:09.13

Medalists
gold medal	Katie Ledecky	United States
silver medal	Ariarne Titmus	Australia
bronze medal	Leah Smith	United States

The women's 800 metre freestyle competition at the 2018 Pan Pacific Swimming Championships took place on August 9 at the Tokyo Tatsumi International Swimming Center. The defending champion was Katie Ledecky of United States.

This event was a timed-final where each swimmer swam just once. Early heat was swum at the end of the preliminary heats on that day from slowest to fastest. The fastest timed final heat was swum with the finals.

== Records ==
Prior to this competition, the existing world and Pan Pacific records were as follows:

World record	Katie Ledecky (USA)	8:04.79	Rio de Janeiro, Brazil	12 August 2016
Pan Pacific Championships record	Katie Ledecky (USA)	8:11.35	Gold Coast, Australia	21 August 2014

== Results ==
All times are in minutes and seconds.

KEY:	CR	Championships record	NR	National record	PB	Personal best	SB	Seasonal best

The timed final was held on 9 August from 10:00 to the slowest heats and from 17:30 to the fastest heat.

Only two swimmers from each country was classified in the award ranking.

=== Total ranking ===
Rank	Heat	Name	Nationality	Time	Notes
1	3	Katie Ledecky	United States	8:09.13	CR
2	3	Ariarne Titmus	Australia	8:17.07	OC
3	3	Leah Smith	United States	8:17.21	
4	3	Kiah Melverton	Australia	8:25.64	
5	2	Erica Sullivan	United States	8:26.27	
6	2	Haley Anderson	United States	8:27.13	
7	2	Madeleine Gough	Australia	8:27.28	
8	2	Ashley Twichell	United States	8:29.36	
9	3	Waka Kobori	Japan	8:31.89	
10	3	Mackenzie Padington	Canada	8:34.49	
11	2	Chase Travis	United States	8:37.86	
12	3	Yukimi Moriyama	Japan	8:41.44	
13	2	Kate Sanderson	Canada	8:43.99	
14	3	Zhang Ke	China	8:44.17	
15	2	Nicole Oliva	Philippines	8:53.21	
16	1	Rosalee Santa Ana	Philippines	9:12.04	
17	1	Osisang Chilton	Palau	10:40.45	
18	1	Mineri Gomez	Guam	10:58.33	

=== Award ranking ===
Rank	Name	Nationality	Time	Notes
1st place, gold medalist(s)	Katie Ledecky	United States	8:09.13	CR
2nd place, silver medalist(s)	Ariarne Titmus	Australia	8:17.07	OC
3rd place, bronze medalist(s)	Leah Smith	United States	8:17.21	
4	Kiah Melverton	Australia	8:25.64	
5	Waka Kobori	Japan	8:31.89	
6	Mackenzie Padington	Canada	8:34.49	
7	Yukimi Moriyama	Japan	8:41.44	
8	Kate Sanderson	Canada	8:43.99	
