= 2018 Pan Pacific Swimming Championships – Women's 4 × 200 metre freestyle relay =

Women's 4 × 200 metre freestyle relay at the 2018 Pan Pacific Swimming Championships
- Venue: Tokyo Tatsumi International Swimming Center
- Dates: 10 August
- Competitors: 16 from 4 nations
- Winning time: 7:44.12

Medalists
gold medal	Ariarne Titmus; Emma McKeon; Mikkayla Sheridan; Madeline Groves	Australia
silver medal	Allison Schmitt; Leah Smith; Katie McLaughlin; Katie Ledecky	United States
bronze medal	Kayla Sanchez; Taylor Ruck; Rebecca Smith; Mackenzie Padington	Canada

The women's 4 × 200 metre freestyle relay competition at the 2018 Pan Pacific Swimming Championships took place on August 10 at the Tokyo Tatsumi International Swimming Center. The defending champion was the United States.

== Records ==
Prior to this competition, the existing world and Pan Pacific records were as follows:

World record	China (CHN); Yang Yu (1:55.47); Zhu Qianwei (1:55.79); Liu Jing (1:56.09); Pang Jiaying (1:54.73)	7:42.08	Rome, Italy	30 July 2009
Pan Pacific Championships record	United States (USA); Shannon Vreeland (1:57.89); Missy Franklin (1:56.12); Leah Smith (1:58.03); Katie Ledecky (1:54.36)	7:46.40	Gold Coast, Australia	22 August 2014

== Results ==
All times are in minutes and seconds.

KEY:	CR	Championships record	NR	National record	PB	Personal best	SB	Seasonal best

=== Final ===
The final was held on 10 August from 18:00.

Rank	Lane	Nation	Swimmers	Time	Notes
1st place, gold medalist(s)	5	Australia	Ariarne Titmus (1:55.27); Emma McKeon (1:55.66); Mikkayla Sheridan (1:56.72); Madeline Groves (1:56.47)	7:44.12	CR, OC
2nd place, silver medalist(s)	4	United States	Allison Schmitt (1:58.62); Leah Smith (1:56.44); Katie McLaughlin (1:55.47); Katie Ledecky (1:53.84)	7:44.37	
3rd place, bronze medalist(s)	6	Canada	Kayla Sanchez (1:58.37); Taylor Ruck (1:54.08); Rebecca Smith (1:58.08); Mackenzie Padington (1:56.75)	7:47.28	
4	3	Japan	Chihiro Igarashi (1:57.88); Rikako Ikee (1:54.69); Rio Shirai (1:58.29); Yui Ohashi (1:58.10)	7:48.96	NR
