= Swimming at the 2017 World Aquatics Championships – Women's 4 × 200 metre freestyle relay =

Women's 4 × 200 metre freestyle relay at the 2017 World Aquatics Championships
- Venue: Danube Arena
- Location: Budapest, Hungary
- Dates: 27 July (heats and final)
- Competitors: 50 from 10 nations
- Teams: 10
- Winning time: 7:43.39

Medalists
gold medal	Leah Smith; Mallory Comerford; Melanie Margalis; Katie Ledecky; Cierra Runge; Hali Flickinger; Madisyn Cox	United States
silver medal	Ai Yanhan; Liu Zixuan; Zhang Yuhan; Li Bingjie; Wang Jingzhuo; Shen Duo	China
bronze medal	Madison Wilson; Emma McKeon; Kotuku Ngawati; Ariarne Titmus; Shayna Jack; Leah Neale	Australia

The Women's 4 × 200 metre freestyle relay competition at the 2017 World Championships was held on 27 July 2017.

== Records ==
Prior to the competition, the existing world and championship records were as follows.

World record	China	7:42.08	Rome, Italy	30 July 2009
Competition record	China	7:42.08	Rome, Italy	30 July 2009

== Results ==
=== Heats ===
The heats were held at 10:48.

Rank	Lane	Nation	Swimmers	Time	Notes
1	6	China	Zhang Yuhan (1:57.13); Liu Zixuan (1:56.82); Wang Jingzhuo (1:59.09); Shen Duo (1:58.71)	7:51.75	Q
2	8	Japan	Chihiro Igarashi (1:58.74); Rikako Ikee (1:58.53); Tomomi Aoki (1:58.64); Aya Takano (1:57.76)	7:53.67	Q
3	4	United States	Melanie Margalis (1:56.58); Cierra Runge (1:59.17); Hali Flickinger (1:58.46); Madisyn Cox (1:59.52)	7:53.73	Q
4	5	Australia	Madison Wilson (1:57.88); Kotuku Ngawati (1:58.82); Shayna Jack (1:58.77); Leah Neale (1:59.27)	7:54.74	Q
5	1	Netherlands	Robin Neumann (1:59.00); Femke Heemskerk (1:56.51); Esmee Vermeulen (1:59.09); Marjolein Delno (2:00.56)	7:55.16	Q
6	2	Russia	Daria Ustinova (1:59.00); Viktoriya Andreyeva (1:57.95); Anastasia Guzhenkova (2:00.06); Arina Openysheva (1:58.66)	7:55.67	Q
7	7	Hungary	Ajna Késely (1:58.60); Evelyn Verrasztó (1:58.90); Zsuzsanna Jakabos (1:57.54); Fanni Gyurinovics (2:00.73)	7:55.77	Q
8	3	Canada	Katerine Savard (1:59.16); Mary-Sophie Harvey (1:59.39); Rebecca Smith (1:58.54); Kayla Sanchez (1:59.40)	7:56.49	Q
9	0	Italy	Alice Mizzau (1:59.56); Stefania Pirozzi (1:59.58); Anna Mascolo (2:01.68); Simona Quadarella (2:02.00)	8:02.82	
10	9	Denmark	Signe Bro (2:01.29); Marina Hansen (2:00.56); Maj Howardsen (2:02.38); Anina Lund (2:02.44)	8:06.67	

=== Final ===
The final was held at 19:16.

Rank	Lane	Nation	Swimmers	Time	Notes
1st place, gold medalist(s)	3	United States	Leah Smith (1:55.97); Mallory Comerford (1:56.92); Melanie Margalis (1:56.48); Katie Ledecky (1:54.02)	7:43.39	
2nd place, silver medalist(s)	4	China	Ai Yanhan (1:56.62); Liu Zixuan (1:56.34); Zhang Yuhan (1:56.54); Li Bingjie (1:55.46)	7:44.96	
3rd place, bronze medalist(s)	6	Australia	Madison Wilson (1:57.33); Emma McKeon (1:56.26); Kotuku Ngawati (1:58.31); Ariarne Titmus (1:56.61)	7:48.51	
4	7	Russia	Veronika Popova (1:55.95); Viktoriya Andreyeva (1:57.48); Daria Ustinova (1:56.93); Arina Openysheva (1:58.23)	7:48.59	NR
5	5	Japan	Chihiro Igarashi (1:57.84); Rikako Ikee (1:57.38); Tomomi Aoki (1:57.72); Aya Takano (1:57.49)	7:50.43	NR
6	1	Hungary	Ajna Késely (1:58.62); Zsuzsanna Jakabos (1:58.09); Evelyn Verrasztó (1:58.34); Katinka Hosszú (1:56.28)	7:51.33	
7	2	Netherlands	Robin Neumann (1:58.83); Femke Heemskerk (1:55.46); Esmee Vermeulen (1:59.55); Marjolein Delno (2:00.45)	7:54.29	
8	8	Canada	Mary-Sophie Harvey (1:58.57); Rebecca Smith (1:58.70); Katerine Savard (1:58.23); Mackenzie Padington (2:00.07)	7:55.57	
