= 2026 Pan Pacific Swimming Championships – Women's 1500 metre freestyle =

Women's 1500 metre freestyle at the 2026 Pan Pacific Swimming Championships
- Venue: William Woollett Jr. Aquatics Center
- Dates: August 12
- Competitors: 19 from 7 nations
- Winning time: 15:36.09

Medalists
gold medal	Katie Ledecky	United States
silver medal	Lani Pallister	Australia
bronze medal	Moesha Johnson	Australia

Official Video (slowest heat)

Official Video (fastest heat)

The women's 1500 metre freestyle event at the 2026 Pan Pacific Swimming Championships was held on August 12 at the William Woollett Jr. Aquatics Center in Irvine, California. The event was won by American Katie Ledecky in a time of 15:36.09, ahead of Australia's Lani Pallister, who claimed the silver medal in an Australian and Oceanian record time of 15:38.62. Her compatriot Moesha Johnson won the bronze medal in a personal best time of 15:53.49, improving on her previous best of 15:55.75 set in June 2022. Japan's Ichika Kajimoto finished fourth in 16:00.10.

The event was contested as a timed final, with each swimmer competing only once and the overall rankings determined by the fastest times across three heats. Nineteen swimmers representing seven nations participated, with the two slower heats held during the morning session and the fastest-seeded heat contested in the evening. Under the competition regulations, a maximum of two swimmers from each nation were permitted to compete in the fastest heat of a timed-final event, while only the two fastest swimmers from each nation were eligible to score among the top eight.

Twelve swimmers who had competed in the women's 10 km open water event earlier in the championships also participated in the 1500 metre freestyle, including Johnson, who had won the open water gold medal, and Kajimoto, who had claimed bronze. In the morning heats, Australians Molly Walker and Tiana Kritzinger recorded times of 16:10.58 and 16:16.43, respectively, placing seventh and ninth overall. Walker, who had won bronze medals in both the 800 metre and 1500 metre freestyle at the 2026 Commonwealth Games, finished more than nine seconds outside her personal best of 16:01.36, set the previous month. Kritzinger, who had placed sixth in the 1500 metre freestyle at the Commonwealth Games, also finished outside her previous performance of 16:11.36. American Ashley Twichell, aged 37, finished tenth overall in 16:29.42, having placed seventh in the 10 km open water event two days earlier. Her compatriot Becca Mann and Australia's Jacqueline Davison-McGovern, who had finished fourth and fifth, respectively, in the open water event, placed eleventh and twelfth overall in the 1500 metre freestyle. Mann finished in 16:31.42, just 0.05 seconds ahead of Davison-McGovern in 16:31.47.

In the evening heat, Ledecky and Pallister established a fast early pace, completing the opening 400 metres in 4:02.54 and 4:03.05, respectively, both faster than the corresponding split of 4:04.88 from Ledecky's world record performance in 2018. Although both swimmers subsequently fell behind world-record pace, Ledecky extended her lead, reaching 800 metres in 8:12.41 compared with Pallister's 8:14.26. Ledecky maintained her advantage over the remaining distance to secure the gold medal, finishing 2.53 seconds ahead of Pallister. Her victory was her third consecutive Pan Pacific title in the event, extending an unbeaten record in international 1500 metre freestyle competition dating back to the 2013 World Aquatics Championships. Her winning time represented the 21st-fastest performance in history in the event. Pallister's silver-medal performance improved on her previous Australian and Oceanian record of 15:39.14, set at the 2025 Australian Swimming Trials, and made her the third-fastest performer in history, surpassing Denmark's Lotte Friis, whose personal best of 15:38.88 had stood since July 2013. The margin of victory was Ledecky's smallest in a major international 1500 metre freestyle final since the 2013 World Championships, when she defeated Friis by 2.35 seconds.

== Records ==
Prior to this competition, the existing records were as follows:

Records before the 2026 Pan Pacific Swimming Championships
Record	Time	Athlete (nation)	Meet	Location	Date	Ref
World record	15:20.48	Katie Ledecky (USA)	2018 TYR Pro Swim Series	Indianapolis, United States	May 16, 2018	
Championship record	15:28.36	Katie Ledecky (USA)	2014 Pan Pacs	Gold Coast, Australia	August 24, 2014	

== Schedule ==
The schedule was as follows:

All times are Pacific Daylight Time (UTC-7)

Date	Time	Round
Wednesday, August 12, 2026	11:38	Slowest heats
Wednesday, August 12, 2026	21:15	Fastest heat

== Results ==
=== Timed final ===
The slower heats began at 11:38 on August 12, 2026 with the fastest heat held at 21:15 on the same day.

Timed final results
Rank	Heat	Lane	Swimmer	Nation	Time	Notes
1	3	4	Katie Ledecky	United States	15:36.09	
2	3	5	Lani Pallister	Australia	15:38.62	OC
3	3	3	Moesha Johnson	Australia	15:53.49	
4	3	6	Ichika Kajimoto	Japan	16:00.10	
5	3	1	Caitlin Deans	New Zealand	16:07.44	
6	3	2	Beatriz Dizotti	Brazil	16:08.56	
7	2	6	Molly Walker	Australia	16:10.58	
8	3	7	Jillian Cox	United States	16:12.25	
9	2	5	Tiana Kritzinger	Australia	16:16.43	
10	2	4	Ashley Twichell	United States	16:29.42	
11	2	7	Becca Mann	United States	16:31.42	
12	2	2	Jacqueline Davison-McGovern	Australia	16:31.47	
13	3	8	Emma Finlin	Canada	16:38.45	
14	2	3	Mariah Denigan	United States	16:43.24	
15	2	1	Callan Lotter	South Africa	16:43.82	
16	2	8	Katherine Warkentin	Canada	17:14.20	
17	1	4	Carli Antonopoulos	South Africa	17:27.62	
18	1	5	Sasha-Lee Hemmens	South Africa	18:02.17	
19	1	3	Kiara Banks	South Africa	18:03.06	

=== Award ranking ===
Award ranking
Rank	Swimmer	Nation	Time	Notes
1st place, gold medalist(s)	Katie Ledecky	United States	15:36.09	
2nd place, silver medalist(s)	Lani Pallister	Australia	15:38.62	
3rd place, bronze medalist(s)	Moesha Johnson	Australia	15:53.49	
4	Ichika Kajimoto	Japan	16:00.10	
5	Caitlin Deans	New Zealand	16:07.44	
6	Beatriz Dizotti	Brazil	16:08.56	
7	Jillian Cox	United States	16:12.25	
8	Emma Finlin	Canada	16:38.45	
