= Swimming at the 2018 Summer Youth Olympics – Girls' 200 metre freestyle =

Girls' 200 metre freestyle at the 2018 Summer Youth Olympics
- Venue: Natatorium
- Dates: 10 October
- Competitors: 34 from 29 nations
- Winning time: 1:57.88

Medalists
gold medal	Ajna Késely	Hungary
silver medal	Yang Junxuan	China
bronze medal	Barbora Seemanová	Czech Republic

The girls' 200 metre freestyle event at the 2018 Summer Youth Olympics took place on 10 October at the Natatorium in Buenos Aires, Argentina.

== Results ==
=== Heats ===
The heats were started at 10:41.

Rank	Heat	Lane	Name	Nationality	Time	Notes
1	4	4	Ajna Késely	Hungary	1:59.52	Q
2	4	3	Julia Mrozinski	Germany	2:00.00	Q
3	5	4	Yang Junxuan	China	2:00.43	Q
4	5	5	Barbora Seemanová	Czech Republic	2:00.44	Q
5	3	5	Rafaela Raurich	Brazil	2:00.73	Q
6	4	5	Nagisa Ikemoto	Japan	2:01.18	Q
7	5	7	Marlene Kahler	Austria	2:01.43	Q
8	5	2	Nicole Oliva	Philippines	2:02.08	Q
9	5	1	Erika Fairweather	New Zealand	2:02.32	
10	5	6	Abbey Webb	Australia	2:02.48	
11	3	2	Snæfríður Sól Jórunnardóttir	Iceland	2:02.51	
12	3	6	Kyla Leibel	Canada	2:02.69	
13	4	1	Christie Chue	Singapore	2:02.72	
14	4	7	Duné Coetzee	South Africa	2:02.83	
15	4	6	Petra Barócsai	Hungary	2:02.87	
16	5	3	Aleksandra Knop	Poland	2:03.25	
17	2	4	Ieva Maļuka	Latvia	2:03.72	
18	3	3	Tinky Ho	Hong Kong	2:03.81	
19	3	1	Kaitlynn Sims	United States	2:04.23	
20	4	2	Aleksa Gold	Estonia	2:04.27	
21	3	7	Celine Rieder	Germany	2:04.48	
22	2	1	Samantha Bello	Peru	2:04.95	
23	3	4	Michaela Ryan	Australia	2:04.95	
24	2	3	Andrea Galisteo	Spain	2:05.06	
25	2	5	Kate Beavon	South Africa	2:05.88	
26	4	8	Elizaveta Klevanovich	Russia	2:06.08	
27	2	6	Nea-Amanda Heinola	Finland	2:06.78	
28	3	8	Ana Vieira	Brazil	2:06.78	
29	1	4	Inés Marín	Chile	2:07.53	
30	2	2	Fatima Alkaramova	Azerbaijan	2:08.99	
31	2	8	Alexandra Frazão	Portugal	2:09.22	
32	1	5	Majda Chebaraka	Algeria	2:10.39	
33	1	3	Sonia Tumiotto	Tanzania	2:12.05	
34	1	6	Natalia Kuipers	Virgin Islands	2:15.17	
	2	7	Anicka Delgado	Ecuador	DNS	
	5	8	Leoni Richter	Switzerland	DNS	

=== Final ===
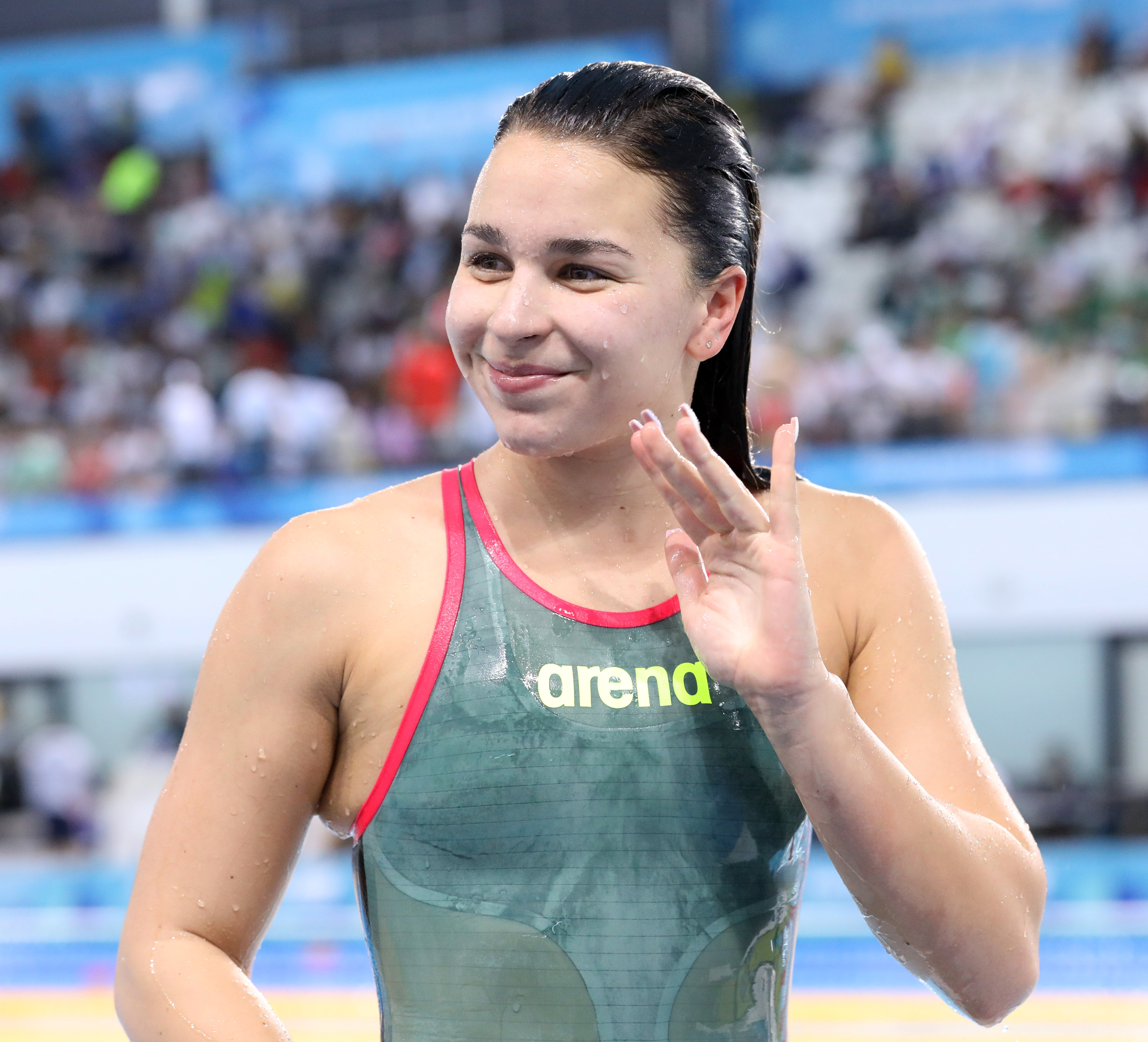
Ajna Késely, Youth Olympic Champion

The final was held at 19:10.

Rank	Lane	Name	Nationality	Time	Notes
1st place, gold medalist(s)	4	Ajna Késely	Hungary	1:57.88	
2nd place, silver medalist(s)	3	Yang Junxuan	China	1:58.05	
3rd place, bronze medalist(s)	6	Barbora Seemanová	Czech Republic	1:58.25	
4	5	Julia Mrozinski	Germany	1:58.84	
5	7	Nagisa Ikemoto	Japan	1:59.89	
6	2	Rafaela Raurich	Brazil	2:01.81	
7	8	Nicole Oliva	Philippines	2:02.13	
8	1	Marlene Kahler	Austria	2:02.57	
