= Erica Sullivan (swimmer) =

American swimmer (born 2000)

Personal information
- Full name: Erica Marie Sullivan
- Nationality: United States
- Born: August 9, 2000 (age 26) Las Vegas, Nevada, U.S.
- Height: 5 ft 7 in (170 cm)
- Weight: 106 lb (48 kg)

Sport
- Sport: Swimming
- Strokes: Freestyle
- Club: Sandpipers of Nevada
Medal record
Women's swimming
Representing the United States
Olympic Games
Silver medal – second place	2020 Tokyo	1500 m freestyle
Junior Pan Pacific Championships
Bronze medal – third place	2016 Maui	1500 m freestyle

Erica Marie Sullivan (born August 9, 2000) is a retired American swimmer. She received a silver medal in the 1500-meter freestyle at the 2020 Summer Olympics after placing second and qualifying in the event at the 2020 US Olympic Swimming Trials.

== Personal life ==
Sullivan's father, John, a former swimmer for the University of Wisconsin, died of esophageal cancer when she was 16. In the aftermath, she dealt with mental health issues. “I'm proud of the mental health barriers that I got through, with my dad dying in 2017 and really hitting a rock bottom in 2018 from the stress of losing a parent at age 16 and having to get over the anxiety, the panic attacks, the depression, the PTSD, all that,” she said during the Olympic Trials in Omaha.

Sullivan is lesbian. Sullivan's mother, Maco, is Japanese.

Sullivan has a YouTube channel she started on August 4, 2014, and where she has published swimming-related content. Her first video, publicly published on December 14, 2014, was a vlog covering her team, the Sandpipers of Nevada, at the Junior National Swimming Championships in December 2014.

Since 2020, Sullivan has produced an annual Twitter thread comparing swimming to films nominated for Academy Awards for the year.

== Career ==
=== 2018 Pan Pacific Championships ===
In August 2018, she represented the United States at the Pan Pacific Swimming Championships in Tokyo, Japan. She placed 5th in the timed-finals of the 800-meter freestyle swimming a time of 8:26.27, 9th in the timed-finals of the 1500-meter freestyle with a time of 16:16.07, and 14th in the heats of the 400-meter freestyle with a time of 4:14.68.

=== 2020 Summer Olympics ===
2020 Summer Olympics
Silver medal – second place	1500 m freestyle	15:41.41

Sullivan qualified to compete at the 2020 Summer Olympics in the 1500-meter freestyle for the USA Olympic swimming team. At the 2020 Olympic Games in Tokyo, Japan, she won the silver medal in the 1500-meter freestyle with a time of 15:41.41, just 4.07 seconds behind gold medalist Katie Ledecky, on July 28, 2021 at the Tokyo Aquatics Center. Sarah Köhler of Germany took the bronze medal with a time of 15:42.91. It was the first occurrence of women competing in the 1500-meter freestyle at the Summer Olympic Games.

=== 2022 - 2024 ===
Sullivan competed for the University of Texas at the 2022 NCAA DI Swimming and Diving Championships. She took third place in the Women's 500 yard freestyle in a 4:35.92 and second place in the Women's 1650 yard freestyle in a 15:45.94.

Sullivan competed at the 2024 US Olympic Trials, finishing 7th in the 1500 meter freestyle. She subsequently announced her retirement from swimming.

== Awards and honors ==
- Golden Goggle Award nominee, Perseverance Award: 2021
