= Katie Ledecky =

American swimmer (born 1997)

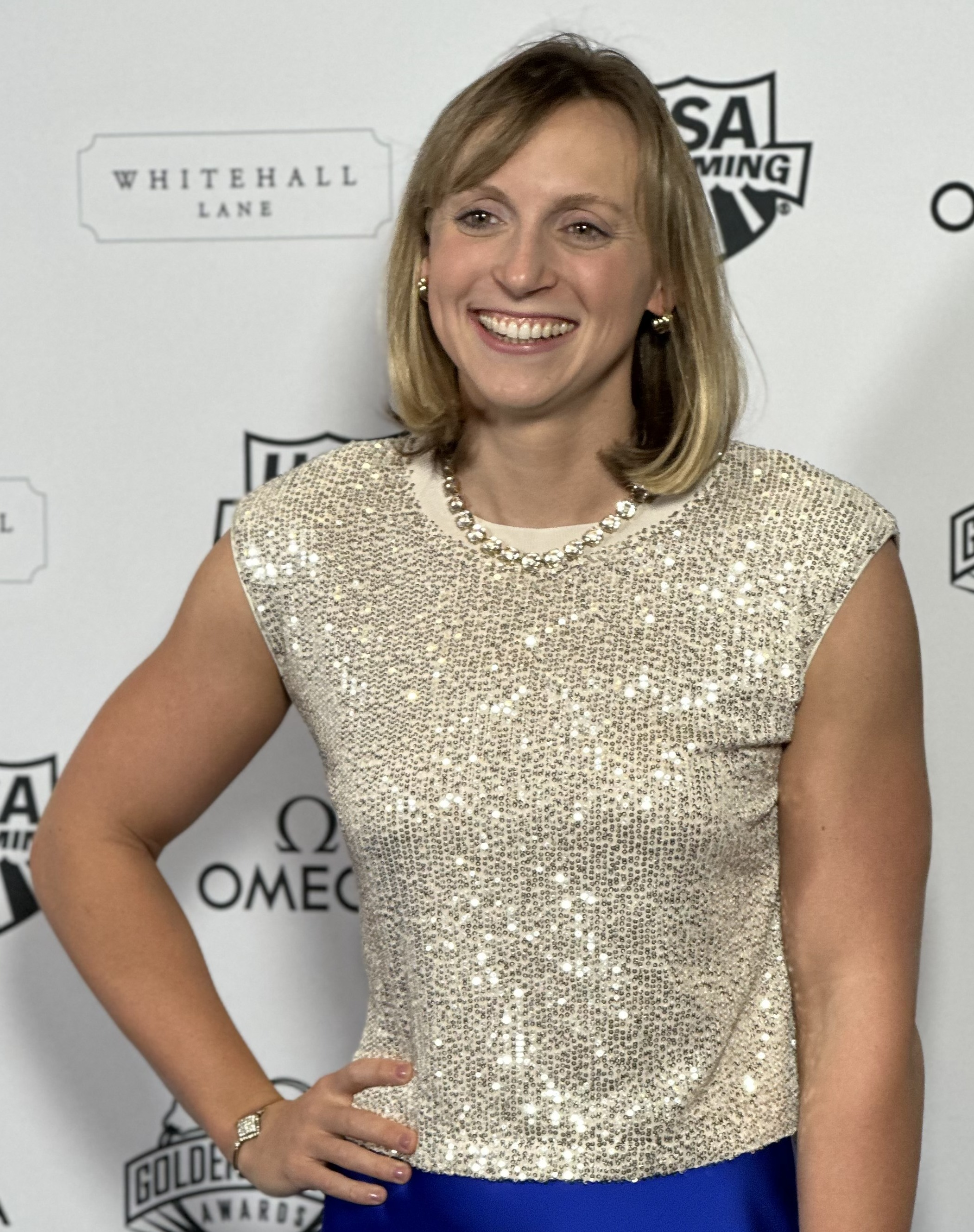
- Katie Ledecky at the 2023 Golden Goggle Awards

Personal information
- Full name: Kathleen Genevieve Ledecky
- National team: United States
- Born: March 17, 1997 (age 29) Washington, D.C., U.S.
- Education: Stanford University (BA)
- Height: 6 ft 0 in (183 cm)
- Weight: 159 lb (72 kg)
- Relative: Jon Ledecky (uncle)
- Katie Ledecky's voice Katie Ledecky on the goals in her early life and career Recorded December 30, 2024

Sport
- Sport: Swimming
- Strokes: Freestyle
- Club: Nation's Capital Swim Club
- College team: Stanford University
- Coach: Yuri Suguiyama; Bruce Gemmell; Greg Meehan; Anthony Nesty
Medal record
Women's swimming
Representing United States
Event	1st	2nd	3rd
Olympic Games	9	4	1
World Championships (LC)	23	6	1
Pan Pacific Championships (LC)	9	4	1
Total	41	14	3
Event	1st	2nd	3rd
200 m freestyle	3	1	1
400 m freestyle	7	4	2
800 m freestyle	13	1	0
1500 m freestyle	11	0	0
4x100 m freestyle	1	1	0
4x200 m freestyle	6	7	0
Total	41	14	3
Olympic Games
Gold medal – first place	2012 London	800 m freestyle
Gold medal – first place	2016 Rio de Janeiro	200 m freestyle
Gold medal – first place	2016 Rio de Janeiro	400 m freestyle
Gold medal – first place	2016 Rio de Janeiro	800 m freestyle
Gold medal – first place	2016 Rio de Janeiro	4×200 m freestyle
Gold medal – first place	2020 Tokyo	800 m freestyle
Gold medal – first place	2020 Tokyo	1500 m freestyle
Gold medal – first place	2024 Paris	800 m freestyle
Gold medal – first place	2024 Paris	1500 m freestyle
Silver medal – second place	2016 Rio de Janeiro	4×100 m freestyle
Silver medal – second place	2020 Tokyo	400 m freestyle
Silver medal – second place	2020 Tokyo	4×200 m freestyle
Silver medal – second place	2024 Paris	4×200 m freestyle
Bronze medal – third place	2024 Paris	400 m freestyle
World Championships (LC)
Gold medal – first place	2013 Barcelona	400 m freestyle
Gold medal – first place	2013 Barcelona	800 m freestyle
Gold medal – first place	2013 Barcelona	1500 m freestyle
Gold medal – first place	2013 Barcelona	4×200 m freestyle
Gold medal – first place	2015 Kazan	200 m freestyle
Gold medal – first place	2015 Kazan	400 m freestyle
Gold medal – first place	2015 Kazan	800 m freestyle
Gold medal – first place	2015 Kazan	1500 m freestyle
Gold medal – first place	2015 Kazan	4×200 m freestyle
Gold medal – first place	2017 Budapest	400 m freestyle
Gold medal – first place	2017 Budapest	800 m freestyle
Gold medal – first place	2017 Budapest	1500 m freestyle
Gold medal – first place	2017 Budapest	4×100 m freestyle
Gold medal – first place	2017 Budapest	4×200 m freestyle
Gold medal – first place	2019 Gwangju	800 m freestyle
Gold medal – first place	2022 Budapest	400 m freestyle
Gold medal – first place	2022 Budapest	800 m freestyle
Gold medal – first place	2022 Budapest	1500 m freestyle
Gold medal – first place	2022 Budapest	4×200 m freestyle
Gold medal – first place	2023 Fukuoka	800 m freestyle
Gold medal – first place	2023 Fukuoka	1500 m freestyle
Gold medal – first place	2025 Singapore	800 m freestyle
Gold medal – first place	2025 Singapore	1500 m freestyle
Silver medal – second place	2017 Budapest	200 m freestyle
Silver medal – second place	2019 Gwangju	400 m freestyle
Silver medal – second place	2019 Gwangju	4×200 m freestyle
Silver medal – second place	2023 Fukuoka	400 m freestyle
Silver medal – second place	2023 Fukuoka	4×200 m freestyle
Silver medal – second place	2025 Singapore	4×200 m freestyle
Bronze medal – third place	2025 Singapore	400 m freestyle
Pan Pacific Championships (LC)
Gold medal – first place	2014 Gold Coast	200 m freestyle
Gold medal – first place	2014 Gold Coast	400 m freestyle
Gold medal – first place	2014 Gold Coast	800 m freestyle
Gold medal – first place	2014 Gold Coast	1500 m freestyle
Gold medal – first place	2014 Gold Coast	4×200 m freestyle
Gold medal – first place	2018 Tokyo	400 m freestyle
Gold medal – first place	2018 Tokyo	800 m freestyle
Gold medal – first place	2018 Tokyo	1500 m freestyle
Gold medal – first place	2026 Irvine	1500 m freestyle
Silver medal – second place	2018 Tokyo	4×200 m freestyle
Silver medal – second place	2026 Irvine	400 m freestyle
Silver medal – second place	2026 Irvine	800 m freestyle
Silver medal – second place	2026 Irvine	4×200 m freestyle
Bronze medal – third place	2018 Tokyo	200 m freestyle

Kathleen Genevieve Ledecky (/ləˈdɛki/ lə-DEK-ee; born March 17, 1997) is an American competitive swimmer. She is the most decorated female swimmer in history and the most decorated American woman in Olympic history, with a total of 14 Olympic medals, including nine golds. She has been called the greatest swimmer of all time.

Ledecky has won a record 18 individual gold medals at the World Aquatics Championships, and is the world record holder in the women's 800- and 1500-meter freestyle long course and 1500-meter freestyle short course, as well as the former world record holder in the women's 400-meter freestyle (long course) and 800-meter freestyle (short course). In her international debut at the 2012 London Olympic Games as a 15-year-old, Ledecky unexpectedly won the gold medal in the women's 800-metre freestyle. Four years later, she left Rio de Janeiro as the most decorated female athlete of the 2016 Olympic Games, with four gold medals, one silver medal, and two world records. She's also the former #1 in the world rankings in the 800 freestyle.

At the 2020 Olympic Games, Ledecky emerged as the most decorated U.S. female athlete and became the first American female swimmer to win an individual event in three straight Olympiads. In 2025, she won gold in the 800 meter World Championship, becoming the first swimmer—male or female—to win seven World Championship gold medals in the same event. In total, she has won 58 medals (41 golds, 14 silvers, and 3 bronzes) in major international competitions, spanning the Summer Olympics, World Championships, and Pan Pacific Championships. During her career, she has broken 17 world records.

Ledecky's success has earned her Swimming World's Female World Swimmer of the Year a record five times. Ledecky was also named Associated Press Female Athlete of the Year in 2017 and 2022, international female Champion of Champions by L'Équipe in 2014 and 2017, United States Olympic Committee Female Athlete of the Year in 2013, 2016 and 2017, Sportswoman of the Year by the Women's Sports Foundation in 2017, and the ESPY Best Female Athlete in 2022. In 2024, she was awarded the Presidential Medal of Freedom by President Joe Biden.

== Early life, swimming, and education ==
Ledecky was born in Washington, D.C. and raised in the suburb of Bethesda, Maryland, the daughter of Mary Gen (née Hagan) and David Ledecky. Her Czech-born paternal grandfather Jaromír Ledecký arrived in New York City on September 8, 1947, as a student. He later became an economist and married an Ashkenazi Jewish woman named Berta Ruth Greenwald in Brooklyn, New York, on December 30, 1956. Through her paternal grandmother, Ledecky has relatives who were murdered in the Holocaust. Ledecky's mother is of Irish descent. She was raised Catholic and continues to practice the faith, often praying the Hail Mary before her races. Her uncle Jon Ledecky is a businessman and a co-owner of the NHL team New York Islanders.

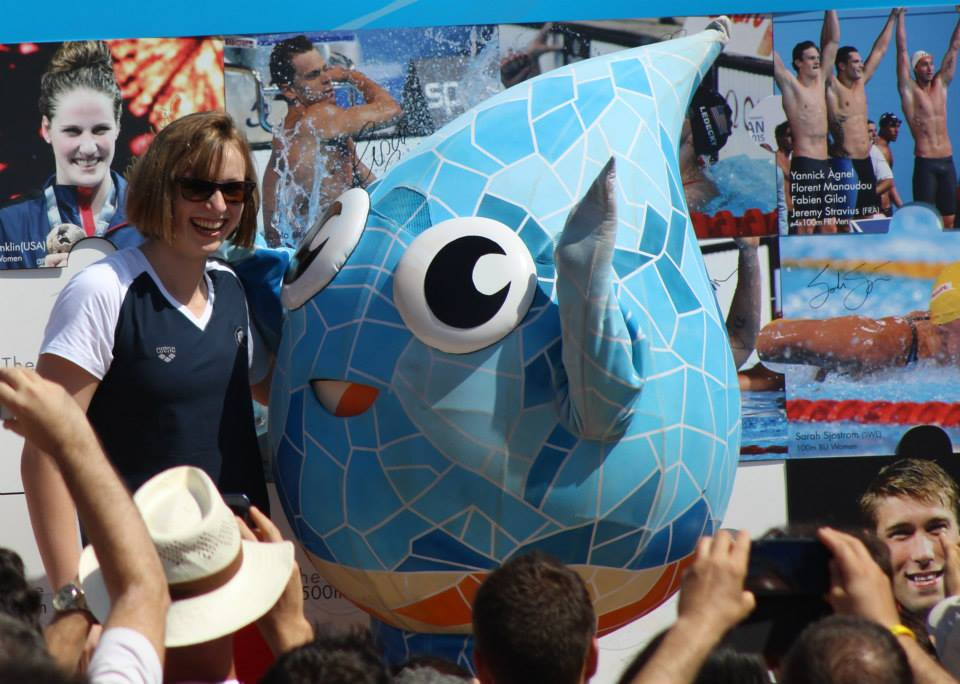
Ledecky (left) at the 2013 FINA World Aquatics Championships in Barcelona

Ledecky began swimming at the age of six under the influence of her older brother, Michael, and her mother, who swam for the University of New Mexico. In Bethesda, she attended Little Flower School through eighth grade and graduated from Stone Ridge School of the Sacred Heart in 2015.

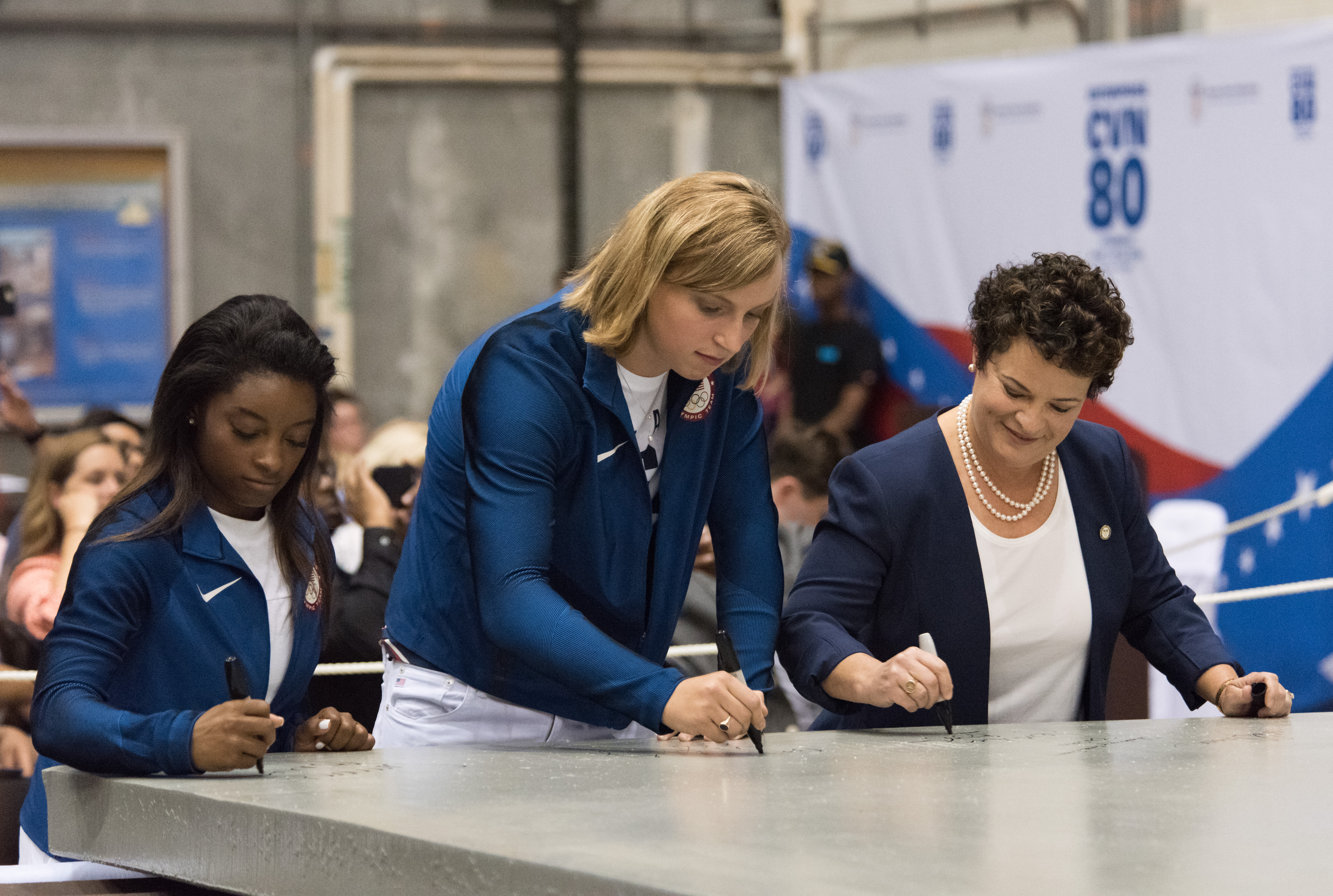
Ledecky (middle) and fellow Olympic champion Simone Biles (left) sign steel plate of USS Enterprise (2017)

During her high-school swimming career, Ledecky twice set the American and US Open record in the 500-yard freestyle, and she twice set the national high-school record in the 200-yard freestyle. During the summers prior to 2012, she swam for MCSL's Palisades Swim Team in Cabin John, Maryland. During the summer of 2012, she trained with the Nation's Capital Swim Club (formerly the Curl Burke Swim Club) under coach Yuri Suguiyama. Following Suguiyama's departure to coach for the University of California, Berkeley, she continued to train with the Nation's Capital Swim Club under coach Bruce Gemmell through the 2016 Summer Olympics. Ledecky accepted an athletic scholarship to Stanford University, where she swam for coach Greg Meehan's Stanford Cardinal women's swimming team.

In December 2016, Ledecky was chosen as one of the sponsors of the US Navy aircraft carrier USS Enterprise alongside Olympic gold medal-winning gymnast Simone Biles. They were the first Olympians to be given this honor. In December 2020, she completed a Bachelor of Arts in psychology and minor in political science from Stanford University, and graduated in June 2021.

== Swimming career ==
=== 2012 ===
==== 2012 US Olympic Trials ====
At the 2012 United States Olympic trials in Omaha, Nebraska (her first senior national competition), Ledecky made the Olympic team by placing first in the 800-meter freestyle with a time of 8:19.78, which was over two seconds ahead of second-place finisher Kate Ziegler. In Omaha, Ledecky also placed third in the 400-meter freestyle (4:05.00) and ninth in the 200-meter freestyle (1:58.66). Her third-place finish in the 400-meter freestyle was the fastest time ever swum by a 15- to 16-year-old American. At 15 years, 4 months, and 10 days, she was the youngest American participant at the 2012 Olympic Games.

==== 2012 Summer Olympic Games ====
2012 Summer Olympics
Gold medal – first place	800 m freestyle	8:14.63 (NR)

At the 2012 Summer Olympics in London, Ledecky qualified to swim in the final of the 800-meter freestyle by placing third overall in the heats with a time of 8:23.84. In the final, Ledecky stunned the field, winning gold by more than four seconds, with a time of 8:14.63, the then second-fastest effort of all time just behind Rebecca Adlington's world record of 8:14.10 set in 2008. In addition, she broke Janet Evans' American record of 8:16.22 that had stood since 1989. In the final, Ledecky went out hard and, by the 200-meter mark, she had already established an almost body-length lead. Her 400-meter split was 4:04.34, a personal best for Ledecky in that distance, and would have placed fifth in the individual 400-meter freestyle. At the 750-meter mark, Ledecky was 3.42 seconds ahead of Mireia Belmonte García, and 0.31 seconds under world record pace. Ledecky won by 4.13 seconds and just missed the world record by 0.53 seconds. Her gold was the first international medal of her career, earning her the 2012 Best Female Performance of the Year and Breakout Performer of the Year at the Golden Goggle Awards.

=== 2013 ===
==== 2013 USA Swimming Championships ====
At the 2013 US National Championships, Ledecky qualified to swim in four individual events and the 4×200-meter freestyle relay at the 2013 World Aquatics Championships in Barcelona, Spain, though she later dropped the 200-meter freestyle from her program. At the National Championships, she finished first in the 400-, 800- and 1500-meter freestyle, and second in the 200-meter freestyle.

==== 2013 World Championships ====
2013 World Championships
Gold medal – first place	400 m freestyle	3:59.82 (NR)
Gold medal – first place	800 m freestyle	8:13.86 (WR)
Gold medal – first place	1500 m freestyle	15:36.53 (WR)
Gold medal – first place	4 × 200 m freestyle	7:45.14

At the 2013 World Championships, Ledecky won gold in the 400-, 800-, and 1500-meter freestyle, and in the 4×200-meter freestyle relay, and set two world records. In winning the 400 through 1500-meter titles, she became the second woman ever to win the events in a World Championships since German Hannah Stockbauer in 2003. In her first event in Barcelona, the 400-meter freestyle, Ledecky became a world champion for the first time by winning in 3:59.82, setting a new American record and becoming the second-fastest performer of all time in the event.

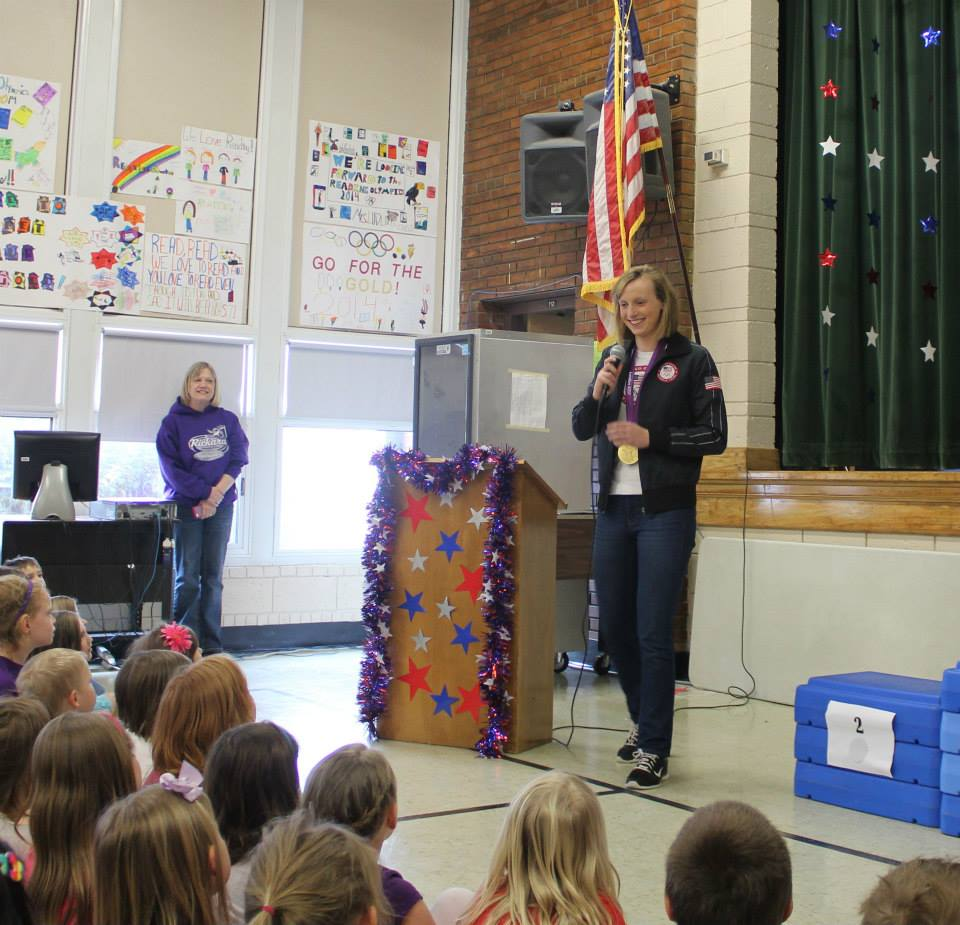
Ledecky speaks to students at Rickard Elementary School in Williston, North Dakota (2015).

In her second event, Ledecky won gold in the 1500-meter freestyle in a world record time of 15:36.53, breaking the record held by compatriot Kate Ziegler by six seconds. The hard-fought race saw Ledecky overcome Dane Lotte Friis in the final few hundred meters after losing the lead at the 300-meter mark and included a final 50 split of 29.47. In her third, and first relay event of her international career, the 4×200-meter freestyle, Ledecky and teammates Shannon Vreeland, Karlee Bispo, and Missy Franklin won gold in 7:45.14. Anchor Missy Franklin overtook Australian Alicia Coutts in the last 200 meters, giving the US the gold. Ledecky provided the US with an early lead, swimming the first leg in a personal best of 1:56.32. In her fourth and last event, the 800-meter freestyle, Ledecky won gold in a world record of 8:13.86, bettering Rebecca Adlington's world record of 8:14.10. Much like the 1500-meter freestyle, Ledecky let Lotte Friis lead most of the race, making a move at the 650-meter mark to eventually win the race by 2.46 seconds.

Ledecky scored more points than any other swimmer to earn the FINA trophy for best female swimmer of the meet. At year's end, Ledecky was named the American Swimmer of the Year and the World Swimmer of the Year by Swimming World magazine. She was also named the best female swimmer for 2013 by FINA Aquatics World magazine.

=== 2014 ===
Ledecky began the year by breaking her own world records in the 800- and 1500-meter freestyle at the 2014 Woodlands Swim Team Senior Invitational in June. Despite being in season and swimming multiple events, Ledecky was able to first break the world record in the 1500-meter freestyle with a time of 15:34.23, bettering her previous mark of 15:36.53. Three days later, Ledecky then broke the world record in the 800-meter freestyle with a time of 8:11.00, bettering her previous mark of 8:13.86.

==== 2014 USA Swimming Championships ====
At the 2014 US National Championships, the qualifying meet for both the 2014 Pan Pacific Swimming Championships and the 2015 World Aquatics Championships, Ledecky finished first in the 200-, 400-, and 800-meter freestyle. In the 400-meter freestyle, Ledecky set her third world record of the year by breaking Federica Pellegrini's 2009 world record of 3:59.15 with a time of 3:58.86. With her mark in the 400, Ledecky became the first female since Janet Evans to hold world records simultaneously in the 400-, 800-, and 1500-meter freestyles.

==== 2014 Pan Pacific Championships ====
2014 Pan Pacific Championships
Gold medal – first place	200 m freestyle	1:55.74 (CR)
Gold medal – first place	400 m freestyle	3:58.37 (WR)
Gold medal – first place	800 m freestyle	8:11.35 (CR)
Gold medal – first place	1500 m freestyle	15:28.36 (WR)
Gold medal – first place	4 × 200 m freestyle	7:46.40 (CR)

At the 2014 Pan Pacific Swimming Championships in Gold Coast, Australia, Ledecky won five gold medals and broke two world records. Her wins came in the 200-, 400-, 800-, and 1500-meter freestyle and the 4×200-meter freestyle. Ledecky almost broke the world record in the 800-meter freestyle, finishing with a time of 8:11.35. Her world records came in the 400- and 1500-meter freestyles, with times of 3:58.37 and 15:28.36, respectively. She became the first woman to win four individual gold medals at a single Pan Pacific Championship.

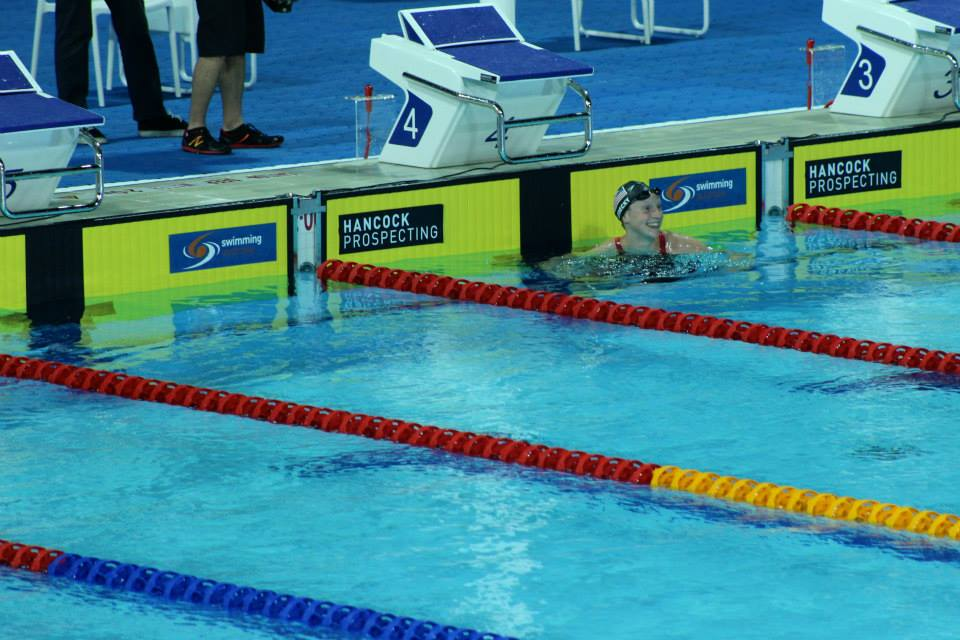
Ledecky after breaking the 1500-meter freestyle world record at the 2014 Pan Pacific Championships.

In the 200-meter freestyle final, Ledecky had over a half-second lead on the field at the halfway point before winning by 1.46 seconds with a meet record time of 1:55.74. Less than an hour later, Ledecky won the 800-meter freestyle, swimming under her world record pace for most of the race before touching in at 8:11.35, the second-fastest time ever, to win by 7.52 seconds over New Zealand swimmer Lauren Boyle.

The next day, Ledecky added her third meet record by swimming on the American 4×200-meter freestyle relay team with Shannon Vreeland, Missy Franklin, and Leah Smith. Swimming the anchor leg, Ledecky erased a 1.2-second deficit going into the final leg of the race, passing Australia's Melanie Schlanger with a 1:54.36 split over the final 200 meters. She also swam in the 100-meter freestyle heats. On the third day of the meet, Ledecky set her fourth meet record in the 400-meter freestyle prelim heats with a time of 4:03.09. That night, Ledecky lowered the record again, setting the first world record ever at the new Gold Coast Aquatic Center with a time of 3:58.37. Ledecky's winning time was over six seconds quicker than American teammate and silver medalist Cierra Runge.

On the meet's final day, Ledecky set her fifth world record of the year, lowering her record in the 1500-meter freestyle by nearly six seconds with a time of 15:28.36. Ledecky swam the second half of the race faster than the first, completing the final 800 meters in 8:14.11—faster than any other woman has completed a regular 800-meter race in a textile suit. Ledecky lapped three competitors in the final and finished 27.33 seconds ahead of silver medalist Boyle. National Team Director Frank Busch described Ledecky's 1500 performance as "the most impressive race I have ever seen, and I've been in the sport for 50 years.... She's blazing a completely different trail than anyone who has come before." During the championships' closing ceremonies, Ledecky was named the female swimmer of the meet. At year's end, Ledecky was named the World Swimmer of the Year and American Swimmer of the Year by Swimming World Magazine.

=== 2015 ===
==== 2015 World Championships ====
2015 World Championships
Gold medal – first place	200 m freestyle	1:55.16
Gold medal – first place	400 m freestyle	3:59.13 (CR)
Gold medal – first place	800 m freestyle	8:07.39 (WR)
Gold medal – first place	1500 m freestyle	15:25.48 (WR)
Gold medal – first place	4 × 200 m freestyle	7:45.37

At the 2015 World Aquatics Championships in Kazan, Russia, Ledecky won five gold medals and broke three world records. Her wins came in the 200-, 400-, 800-, and 1500-meter freestyles and the 4×200-meter freestyle. Her world records came in the 800- and 1500-meter freestyles. Ledecky became the first and only swimmer—male or female—to win the 200-, 400-, 800- and 1500-meter freestyles in a major competition. Ledecky was also named the female swimmer of the meet. Ledecky began the World Championships by winning gold in the 400-meter freestyle in a time of 3:59.13, a new championship record and almost four seconds ahead of her closest competitor.

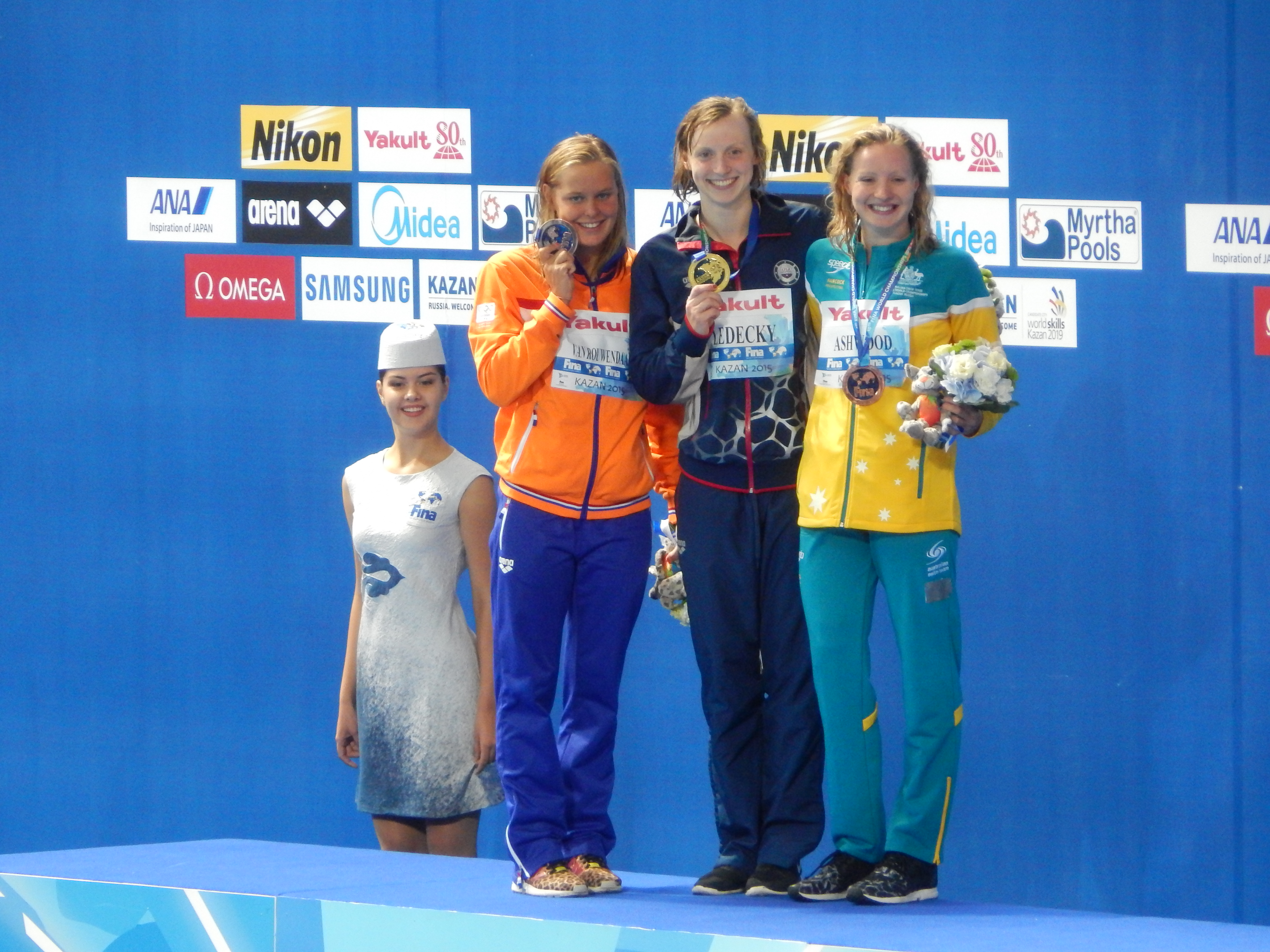
Ledecky after her win in the 400-meter freestyle in Kazan.

In the heats of the 1500-meter freestyle on the second day of competition, Ledecky broke her own world record in a time of 15:27.71. On the third day of competition during the morning session, Ledecky swam in the heats of the 200-meter freestyle and qualified first with a time of 1:55.82. In the evening session, Ledecky faced a tough double with the 1500-meter freestyle final and the semi-finals of the 200-meter freestyle shortly after. In the 1500-meter freestyle, Ledecky broke her own world record in a time of 15:25.48. Twenty-nine minutes later, Ledecky qualified 6th in the 200-meter freestyle with a time of 1:56.76.

In her only event on the fourth day of competition, the 200-meter freestyle, Ledecky won her third gold medal of the meet, winning in a time of 1:55.16. Unlike her other races, it was not an easy win for Ledecky, which featured the likes of Missy Franklin and Federica Pellegrini. In the end, Ledecky was able to hold off a fast charging Pellegrini, eventually winning by a 0.16 margin. Ledecky's final 50-meter split of 29.33 was the second-fastest in the field behind Pellegrini's 29.23.

On the fifth day of competition, Ledecky, with Missy Franklin, Leah Smith, and Katie McLaughlin won gold in the 4×200-meter freestyle relay. Swimming the anchor leg, Ledecky recorded a split of 1:55.64 and the Americans finished with an aggregate time of 7:45.37. On the seventh day of competition, Ledecky completed her World Championships run by winning gold in the 800-meter freestyle in a world record time of 8:07.39, breaking her own record by 3.61 seconds.

=== 2016 ===
Ledecky began 2016 at the Arena Pro Swim Series at Austin. On the final day of competition, she reset her world record in the 800-meter freestyle, clocking a time of 8:06.68. Earlier in the meet, she set world-leading times in the 200- and 400-meter freestyles and a U.S.-leading time in the 100-meter freestyle.

==== 2016 US Olympic Trials ====
At the 2016 United States Olympic trials in Omaha, Nebraska, Ledecky won the 200-, 400- and 800-meter freestyles to qualify for her second Olympic team. Ledecky opened the Trials with a win and meet record in the 400-meter freestyle (3:58.98). Two days later, she recorded a time of 1:54.88 en route to winning the 200-meter freestyle. On July 1, Ledecky broke Janet Evans's 28-year-old national championship record in the morning preliminary heats of the 800-meter freestyle (8:10.91) before placing seventh that evening in the 100-meter freestyle (53.99). The next day, Ledecky lowered her meet record, winning the 800-meter freestyle final by nearly 10 seconds (8:10.32). With her pair of swims in the 800-meter freestyle, Ledecky took control of the top 11 fastest times in the event's history. At the conclusion of the week, Ledecky was named the female swimmer of the meet.

==== 2016 Summer Olympic Games ====
2016 Summer Olympics
Gold medal – first place	200 m freestyle	1:53.73
Gold medal – first place	400 m freestyle	3:56.46 (WR)
Gold medal – first place	800 m freestyle	8:04.79 (WR)
Gold medal – first place	4 × 200 m freestyle relay	7:43.03
Silver medal – second place	4 × 100 m freestyle relay	3:31.89 (NR)

Ledecky's first event in the 2016 Summer Olympics was the 4×100-meter freestyle relay, swimming the anchor leg for the United States in both the prelims and final. Ledecky recorded a split of 52.64 in the heats. In the final, she joined Simone Manuel, Abbey Weitzeil, and Dana Vollmer and recorded a split of 52.79, helping the team earn a silver medal (behind Australia) with a time of 3:31.89, a new national record for the United States.

Her first individual event was the 400-meter freestyle. Ledecky qualified in the heats with a time of 3:58.71, an Olympic record. In the final, she won the gold medal with a world record time of 3:56.46––nearly two seconds faster than her previous record from 2014 and almost 5 seconds ahead of the silver medalist, Jazmin Carlin.

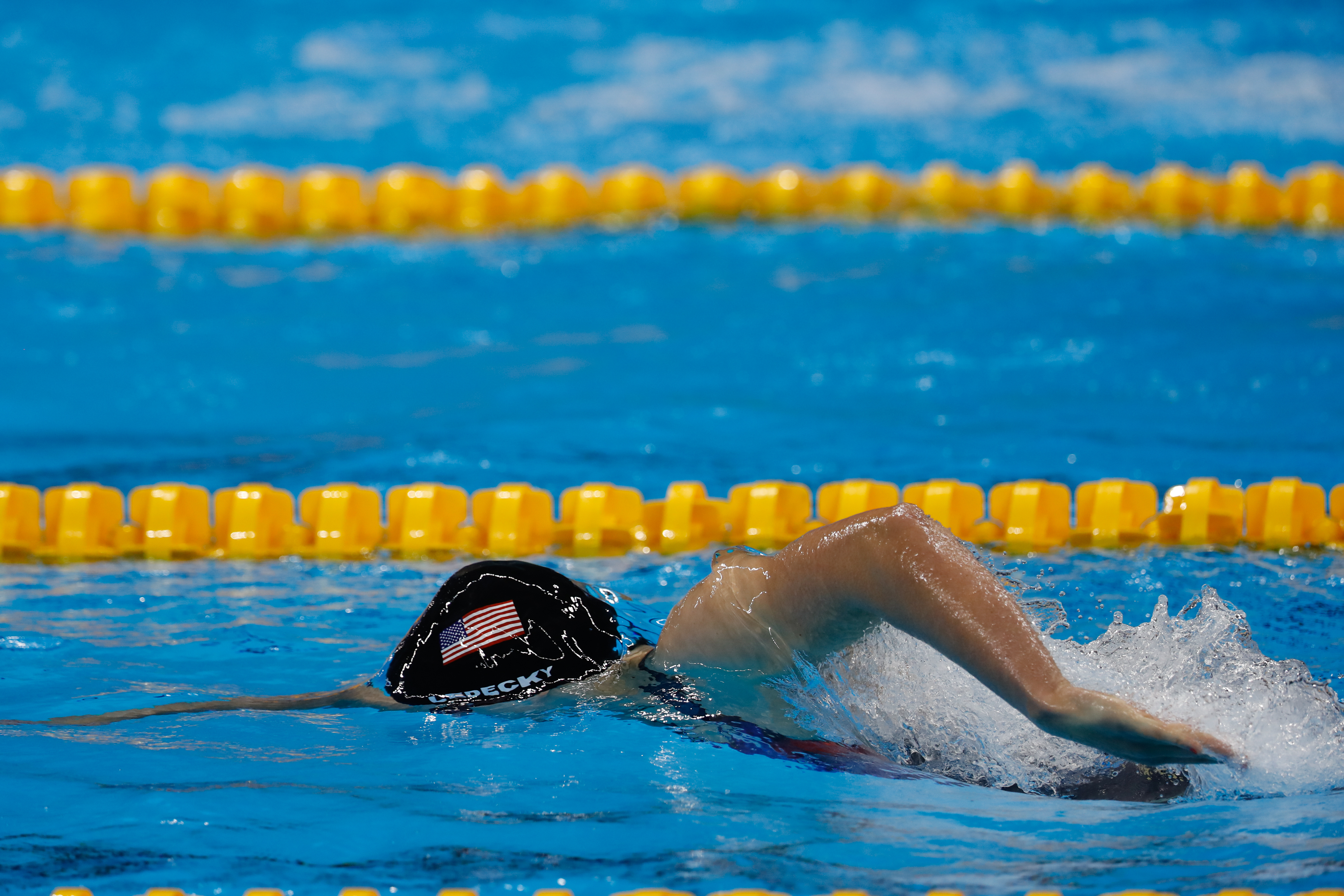
Ledecky swimming at the 2016 Olympic Games

Ledecky won a second gold in the 200-meter freestyle with a personal best of 1:53.73, beating Sarah Sjöström by 0.35 seconds. Ledecky claimed her third gold in the 4×200-meter freestyle relay, with Allison Schmitt, Leah Smith, and Maya DiRado. Swimming the anchor leg again, Ledecky provided the fastest split of the field (1:53.74) to turn a 0.89-second deficit into a 1.84-second victory, stopping the clock at 7:43.03.

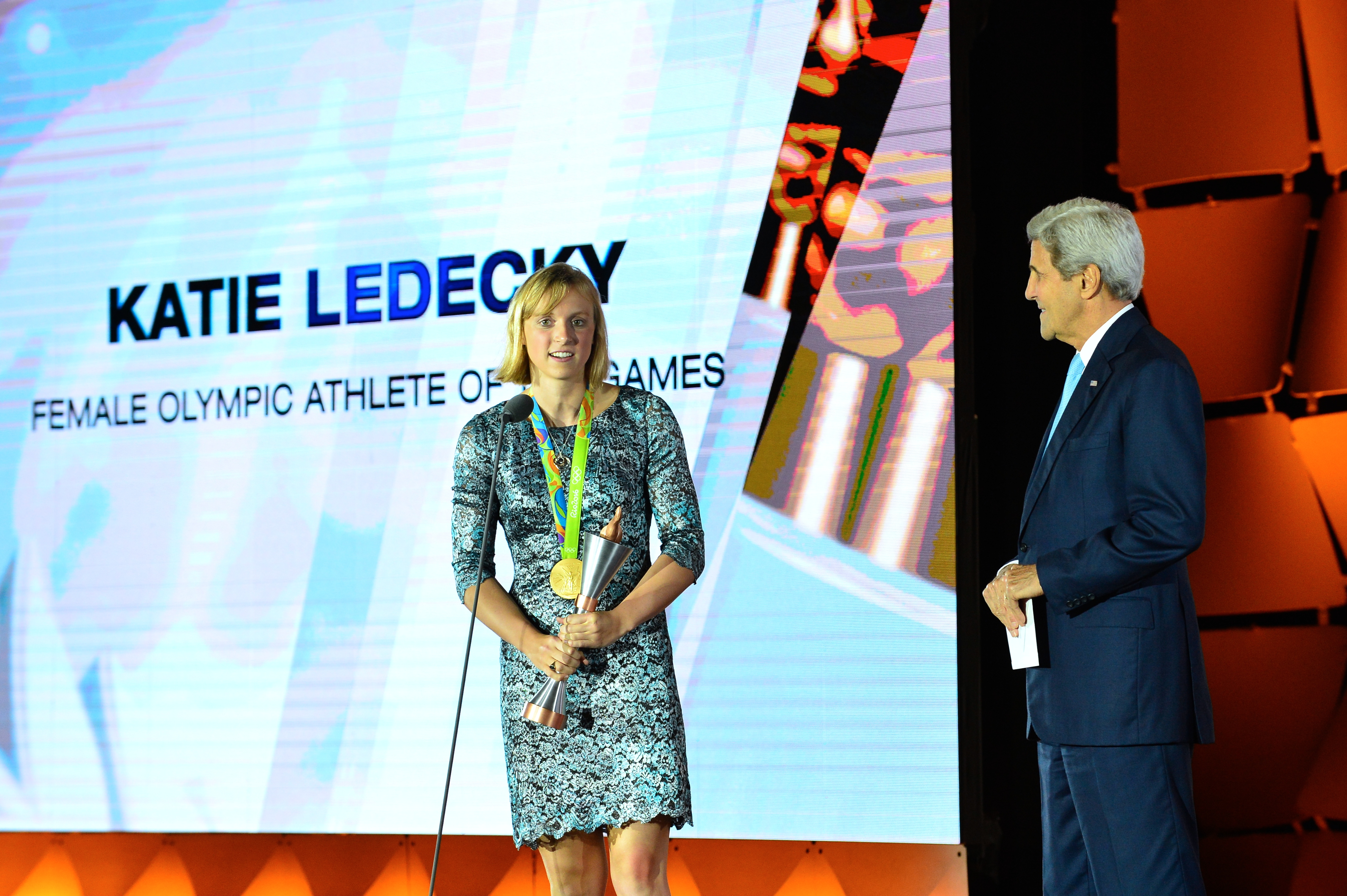
Ledecky (alongside U.S. Secretary of State John Kerry) accepts her award for "Female Athlete of the Olympic Games" at the U.S. Olympic Committee Team USA Award Show in Washington, D.C. (September 2016)

Ledecky won a fourth gold in her final individual event, the 800-meter freestyle. She qualified in the heats with an Olympic record, 8:12.86, and set a world record in the finals of 8:04.79, over 11 seconds faster than the silver medalist, Jazmin Carlin. With three individual titles, she became the first swimmer to win the 200, 400 and 800 m freestyle at the same Olympics since Debbie Meyer did so in 1968 in Mexico City. Ledecky's final medal total (four golds, one silver) is the most decorated single-Olympics performance by a U.S. female athlete in terms of gold medals, topping Missy Franklin (2012; four golds, 1 bronze), Simone Biles (2016; four golds, 1 bronze), and Amy Van Dyken (1996; four golds). Ledecky was also the 2nd most decorated Olympian at the 2016 games behind Michael Phelps (5 golds, 1 silver).

=== 2017 ===
==== 2017 NCAA season ====
During the 2016–17 NCAA season, Ledecky set 12 NCAA records and nine American records while swimming as a freshman for Stanford University. At the Ohio State Invitational in November 2016, Ledecky lowered her American and U.S. Open marks in the women's 500-yard freestyle and 1650-yard freestyle. At the Pac-12 Championships in Federal Way, Washington, Ledecky earned Swimmer of the Meet honors with four American records as Stanford won its first conference title in four years. On the first day of the meet, Ledecky anchored the 800-yard freestyle relay with a 1:40.28 split to break the NCAA, American, and U.S. Open record in the 800-yard freestyle relay with Lia Neal, Katie Drabot, and Ella Eastin. The next day, Ledecky lowered her own mark again in the 500-yard freestyle with a time of 4:25.15.

On the meet's third day, she won the 400-yard individual medley in a new American record of 3:57.68 before finishing second to teammate Simone Manuel in the 200-yard freestyle with a personal best time less than a half hour later. On the meet's final day, Ledecky joined Manuel, Neal, and Janet Hu to break the NCAA and American record in the 400-yard freestyle relay. At the NCAA Championships in Indianapolis, Ledecky helped lead Stanford to its first team title since 1998. She reset her American, NCAA, and U.S. Open records in the 800-yard freestyle relay, 500-yard freestyle, and 400-yard freestyle relay and won a meet-best five race titles overall. On the meet's first day, she recorded the team's fastest split to lower the 800-yard freestyle relay record to 6:45.91 with Manuel, Neal, and Eastin. The next day, she lowered her own record in the 500-yard freestyle with a time of 4:24.06, beating the second-fastest performer of all time, Leah Smith, by nearly five seconds. On the meet's third day, Ledecky's 20th birthday, Ledecky recorded a personal-best time of 1:40.36 in the 200-yard freestyle to edge Manuel and tie Louisville sophomore Mallory Comerford for the title.

On the meet's final day, Ledecky set an NCAA record in the 1000-yard freestyle (9:06.90) en route to a championship record in the 1650-yard freestyle (15:07.70), defeating runner-up Smith by 21.19 seconds and lapping all other competitors. In the meet's final event, Ledecky joined Manuel, Neal, and Hu to swim the second leg of Stanford's 400-yard freestyle relay. The team lowered its previous record with a time of 3:07.61, securing a 526.5–366 decision over runner-up California-Berkeley, the largest championship margin of victory since 2003. Following the season, Ledecky became the first freshman in 35 years to receive the Honda Cup, which recognizes the nation's top female collegiate athlete.

==== 2017 USA Swimming Championships ====
At the 2017 USA Swimming Championships, the qualifying meet for the 2017 World Aquatics Championships, Ledecky won the 200-meter freestyle (1:54.84), 400-meter freestyle (3:58.44), and 800-meter freestyle (8:11.50) and earned a spot on six events.

==== 2017 World Championships ====
2017 World Championships
Gold medal – first place	400 m freestyle	3:58.34 (CR)
Gold medal – first place	800 m freestyle	8:12.68
Gold medal – first place	1500 m freestyle	15:31.82
Gold medal – first place	4 × 100 m freestyle	3:31.72 (AR)
Gold medal – first place	4 × 200 m freestyle	7:43.39
Silver medal – second place	200 m freestyle	1:55.18

At the 2017 World Aquatics Championships in Budapest, Ledecky broke the World Aquatics Championships' all-time female gold medal record, winning five golds and one silver to bring her career title total to 14. In her first event, the 400-meter freestyle, Ledecky successfully defended her world title, finishing with a championship record time of 3:58.34. Later that evening, Ledecky swam the third leg of the 4×100-meter freestyle. Joined with Mallory Comerford, Kelsi Worrell, and Simone Manuel, Ledecky recorded a split of 53.83, helping the team win gold with a time of 3:31.72, a new national record for the United States.

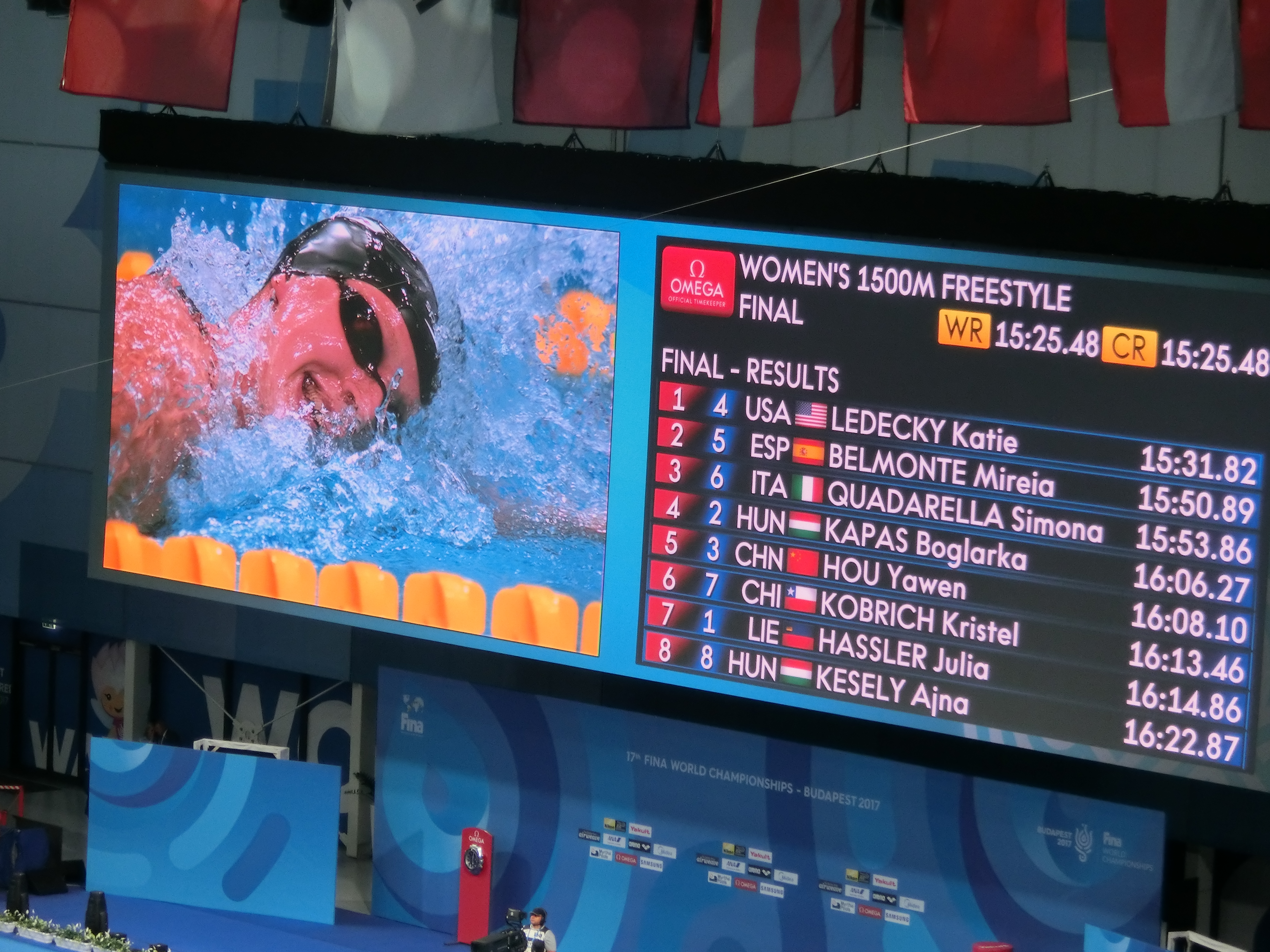
Results scoreboard for the women's 1500-meter freestyle World Championship final in Budapest

On the third day of competition, Ledecky defended her 1500-meter freestyle title, winning with a time of 15:31.82. With this win being Ledecky's twelfth World Championship gold medal, Ledecky passed Missy Franklin for the most gold medals won by a female swimmer in long course World Championships history.

On the fourth day of competition, Ledecky tied for silver in the 200-meter freestyle (with Emma McKeon), finishing behind Federica Pellegrini with a time of 1:55.18. This was Ledecky's first international loss in a final in individual event. Notably, in the semifinals the day prior, Ledecky recorded the top time in the semifinals with a time of 1:54.69. She achieved this result less than an hour after swimming the 1500-meter freestyle final. On the fifth day of competition, Ledecky, with Leah Smith, Mallory Comerford, and Melanie Margalis won gold in the 4×200-meter freestyle relay. Swimming the anchor leg, Ledecky recorded a split of 1:54.02, and the Americans finished with an aggregate time of 7:43.39. Ledecky concluded the meet with a win in the 800-meter freestyle, her fifth-straight title in the event across Olympics and World Championships.

=== 2018 ===
==== 2018 NCAA season ====
During the 2017–18 NCAA season, Ledecky set another three NCAA records and two American records while helping lead Stanford to its second straight team title. At the Texas A&M Invitational in November 2017, Ledecky lowered her American and U.S. Open mark in the 1650-yard freestyle with a time of 15:03.31. Following another undefeated dual meet season, Ledecky earned Swimmer of the Meet honors for the second straight year at the Pac-12 Championships in Federal Way, sweeping the 500-yard freestyle, 400-yard individual medley, and 200-yard freestyle. In the 400-yard individual medley, Ledecky broke Katinka Hosszú's all-time record by one-hundredth of a second, finishing in 3:56.53. Stanford earned its second team title in as many years.

At the NCAA Championships, Ledecky won the 500 and 1650-yard freestyle events by record margins and anchored the winning 800-yard freestyle relay team of Katie Drabot, Brooke Forde, and Ella Eastin. Ledecky finished second in the 400-yard individual medley to Eastin, who lowered the record Ledecky set a month earlier at the Pac-12 Championships. In the 1650-yard freestyle, Ledecky re-set her NCAA record in the 1000-yard free with a split of 9:05.89 en route to winning by more than 28 seconds. In the team standings, Stanford beat runner-up California-Berkeley by 220 points, the largest margin of victory in 25 years.

A week following Stanford's championship win, Ledecky announced at the National Press Club that she will forego her final two seasons of NCAA eligibility in order to accept professional endorsement and sponsorship opportunities. She signed with Wasserman sports agent Dan Levy for representation. At the academic year's conclusion, the College Sports Information Directors of America named Ledecky the Division I Academic All-America Team Member of the Year for her athletic and academic achievements.

==== Professional career ====
Ledecky made her debut as a professional swimmer on May 16, 2018, at the TYR Pro Swim Series in Indianapolis, Indiana, where she beat her old world record in the 1500-meter freestyle, setting a new world record of 15:20.48. She broke the existing mark by five seconds. Ledecky signed her first sponsorship deal with TYR Sport, Inc. on June 8, 2018.

==== 2018 USA Swimming Championships ====
In July 2018, at the 2018 USA Swimming Championships in Irvine, Ledecky qualified for the 2018 Pan Pacific Championships by finishing first in the 200-, 400-, and 800-meter freestyle.

==== 2018 Pan Pacific Championships ====
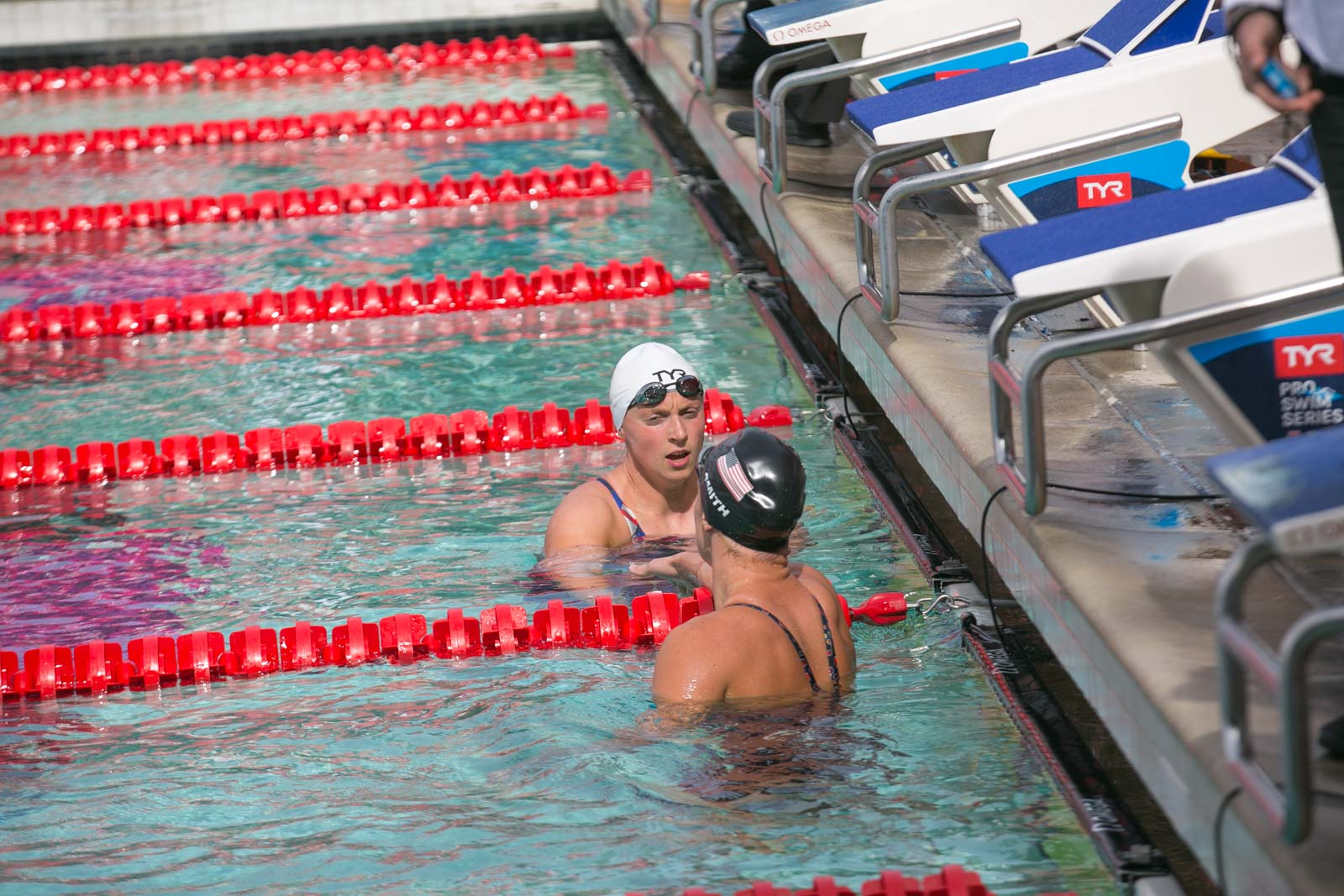
Ledecky and Leah Smith are alone at the finish after the 800m free in 2018

2018 Pan Pacific Championships
Gold medal – first place	400 m freestyle	3:58.50
Gold medal – first place	800 m freestyle	8:09.13 (CR)
Gold medal – first place	1500 m freestyle	15:38.97
Silver medal – second place	4 × 200 m freestyle	7:44.37
Bronze medal – third place	200 m freestyle	1:55.15

At the 2018 Pan Pacific Championships in Tokyo, Ledecky led all swimmers with three individual titles, winning golds in the 400-, 800-, and 1500-meter freestyle. She also took bronze in the 200-meter freestyle and silver in the 4x200-meter freestyle. On the first day of competition, Ledecky won gold in the 800-meter freestyle with a championship-record time of 8:09.13, topping runner-up Ariarne Titmus of Australia by 7.94 seconds. Just over an hour later, Ledecky took third in the 200-meter freestyle (1:55.15), finishing behind Canada's Taylor Ruck (1:54.44) and Japan's Rikako Ikee (1:54.85).

The next day, Ledecky anchored the United States team of Allison Schmitt, Leah Smith, and Katie McLaughlin in the 4x200-meter freestyle relay. Entering the water with a 2.88-second deficit, Ledecky swam the fourth-fastest relay split in history (1:53.84), nearly overtaking Australian Madeline Groves, who touched 0.25 seconds ahead of Ledecky to set a new championship and national record. On the third day, Ledecky defeated Titmus wire-to-wire in the 400-meter freestyle. Ledecky concluded the championships with another gold medal in the 1500-meter freestyle, winning by a margin of 21.11 seconds (15:38.97).

=== 2019 ===
==== 2019 World Championships ====
2019 World Championships
Gold medal – first place	800 m freestyle	8:13.58
Silver medal – second place	400 m freestyle	3:59.97
Silver medal – second place	4 × 200 m freestyle	7:41.87 (NR)

At the 2019 World Aquatics Championships in Gwangju, South Korea, Ledecky battled illness and withdrew from two events before winning her fourth-straight World Championship title in the 800-meter freestyle. On the first day of competition, Ledecky led Australian Ariarne Titmus into the final wall of the 400-meter freestyle final before fading to second. The next morning, Ledecky struggled through her preliminary heat of the 1500-meter freestyle despite qualifying first for the event's final. She subsequently announced her withdrawal from the 1500 and 200-meter freestyle due to illness.

Ledecky returned to competition three days later to swim the final of the women's 4x200-meter freestyle relay. The Americans (Simone Manuel, Ledecky, Melanie Margalis and Katie McLaughlin) set a new American record and swam under the existing world record with a time of 7:41.87, yet placed second to the Australian team (7:41.50). Still recovering from illness, Ledecky qualified second the next day for the final of the 800-meter freestyle. In the final, Ledecky swam to an early lead before Italian swimmer Simona Quadarella took over midway through the race. Ledecky trailed Quadarella into the final wall. Ledecky passed Quadarella and pulled away in the final 50 meters to win by 1.41 seconds.

In the inaugural season of the International Swimming League, Ledecky represented DC Trident. For the seventh-straight year, Ledecky finished the year with the top times in the world in both the 800- and 1500-meter freestyle (8:10.70 and 15:35.98). Ledecky collected several end-of-decade honors. Fifty-two percent of SwimSwam.com readers voted Ledecky the top swimmer of the decade, ahead of Michael Phelps. Readers of The London Evening Standard voted Ledecky the International Sportswoman of the Decade. She finished third in the Associated Press's Female Athlete of the Decade voting, behind Serena Williams and Simone Biles.

=== 2020 ===
Ledecky began 2020 at the TYR Pro Swim Series in Des Moines, Iowa, where she won the 200-, 400- and 1500-meter freestyle races. Ledecky withdrew from the 800-meter freestyle race due to illness. Ledecky did not compete at any other events during 2020.

=== 2021 ===
Ledecky began 2021 at the TYR Pro Swim Series at San Antonio, Texas. She won the 200-, 400-, 800- and 1500-meter freestyle races. On Thursday May 20, 2021, at the Longhorn Aquatics Elite Invite Ledecky won the long course 100 meter freestyle final by one one-hundredth of a second in a time of 53.82 with second place going to Simone Manuel.

==== 2021 US Olympic Trials ====
As part of the NBC evening telecast for day one of the 2020 USA Swimming Olympic trials (postponed to June 2021 due to the COVID-19 pandemic), Ledecky was featured in an interview discussing Stanford University's commencement, finishing her college degree, and training for the Olympic Trials. Because training facilities were closed during the pandemic, Ledecky and her colleague Simone Manuel trained for the Olympics in a 25-yard private pool in Atherton, in the backyard of masters swimmer Tod Spieker.

On the second day, June 14, 2021, Ledecky competed in the prelims of the 400 meter freestyle in the morning, swimming a 4:03.07, ranking 1st out of all prelims heats, and advancing to the final in the evening. The 400 meter freestyle was the first race on Ledecky's schedule where she had the opportunity to make the 2020 USA Olympic Team. In the evening final of the 400 meter freestyle, Ledecky finished first with a time of 4:01.27, securing her first spot on her third US Olympic Team swimming the 400 meter freestyle at the 2020 Summer Olympics. This accomplishment was highlighted by various news outlets including NBC Sports, Newsweek, and USA Today.

In the morning of day three, Ledecky swam a 1:57.58 in the 200 meter freestyle prelims, ranking second fastest of all heats. Two events later, she swam a 15:43.10 in the 1500 meter freestyle prelims, ranking as the fastest swimmer of prelims heat, advancing to the final, and setting a new Championship Record over four seconds faster than the previous record she set in 2013. Later the same day in the evening semifinals for the 200 meter freestyle, Ledecky finished first with a time of 1:55.83.

On day 4, June 16, she won both the 200m and 1500m freestyle finals in the evening. Ledecky swam a 15:40.50 in the 1500 meter freestyle, lowering her Championship Record from the day before and becoming the first winner of the women's 1500 meter freestyle at the US Olympic Trials. She swam a 1:55.11 in the 200 meter freestyle. These two swims secured her spots on the US Olympic Team for the 2020 Summer Olympics in the 1500 meter freestyle and 200 meter freestyle individual events as well as the 4 × 200 meter freestyle relay. Ledecky won the 200 meter and 1500 meter freestyle finals in a time span of about 70 minutes as well as collecting her medal at the 200 meter freestyle medal ceremony and eating a snack. On June 18, 2021, the sixth day of competition, Ledecky won with a time of 8:16.61 in the prelims heats of the 800-meter freestyle and advanced to the final. The following day in the final, Ledecky won with a time of 8:14.62 and qualified to swim the 800 meter freestyle at the 2020 Summer Olympics for the United States.

==== 2020 Summer Olympic Games ====
2020 Summer Olympics
Gold medal – first place	800 m freestyle	8:12.57
Gold medal – first place	1500 m freestyle	15:37.34
Silver medal – second place	400 m freestyle	3:57.36
Silver medal – second place	4 × 200 m freestyle	7:40:73 (NR)

At the 2020 Summer Olympics in Tokyo, Japan, Ledecky won two gold medals and two silver medals, making her the most decorated U.S. female athlete for a second straight Summer Olympics. Ledecky began her racing in the prelims of the 400 meter freestyle, ranking first overall with her time of 4:00.45 and advancing to the final. However, she finished second to Australian swimmer Ariarne Titmus to win the silver medal, trailing Titmus by half a second after leading at the 300m mark. Ledecky's time of 3:57.36 was the second-fastest time of her career and fourth-fastest in history. This was Ledecky's first loss in an individual event at the Olympics.

In the debut of the women's 1500 meter freestyle at the Summer Olympics, Ledecky set an Olympic record in her heat with a time of 15:35.35 and advanced to the final ranked first overall. In the same prelims session as the 1500 meter freestyle, Ledecky ranked first in the 200 meter freestyle with a time of 1:55.28 and advanced to the event's semifinals. She swam a 1:55.34 in the semifinals of the 200 meter freestyle and advanced to the final ranking third overall. In the finals of these two events, Ledecky failed to reach the podium for the 200 m freestyle, placing 5th behind Titmus, Haughey, Oleksiak, and Yang, but placed 1st in the 1500 m race, leading teammate Erica Sullivan (silver) by 4 seconds, clinching her first gold medal of the Games. She finished the final in 15:37.34, but her record from the preliminary round still holds.

The next day, Ledecky anchored for Team USA in the women's 4 × 200 freestyle relay, winning a silver medal alongside teammates Allison Schmitt, Paige Madden, and Katie McLaughlin behind China. Before she entered the pool, the United States was trailing both Australia and China, but she swam a time of 1:53.76 to finish the race 0.4 seconds behind the Chinese swimmer Li Bingjie and ahead of Australia, who were the favorites coming into the competition. Ledecky's split was the fastest of all swimmers in the relay finals. Ledecky won her second gold medal of the Olympics and her seventh of all time in the 800-meter freestyle. Her six individual gold medals are the most of any female Olympic swimmer and female US Olympian, and the second-most of all Olympic swimmers behind Michael Phelps. She became the first swimmer to win a distance event three times in a row, as well as the youngest and oldest person to win the 800 free (at age 15 in 2012 and age 24 in 2021). Following the Olympic Games on September 22, Ledecky announced her intention to train with coach Anthony Nesty at the University of Florida. Additionally, Ledecky signed on to be a volunteer swim coach for the Florida Gators.

=== 2022 ===
==== 2022 US International Team Trials ====
At the 2022 USA Swimming International Team Trials in Greensboro, Ledecky qualified for the 2022 World Aquatics Championships by finishing first in the 200-meter freestyle (1:55.15), the 400-meter freestyle (3:59.52), the 800-meter freestyle (8:09.27) and the 1500-meter freestyle (15:38.99).

==== 2022 World Championships ====
2022 World Championships
Gold medal – first place	400 m freestyle	3:58.15 (CR)
Gold medal – first place	800 m freestyle	8:08.04
Gold medal – first place	1500 m freestyle	15:30.15
Gold medal – first place	4 × 200 m freestyle	7:41.45 (CR)

At the 2022 World Aquatics Championships in Budapest, Ledecky won all four of her events: the 400 meter freestyle, 1500 meter freestyle, 4 × 200 freestyle relay, and 800-meter freestyle. With four golds, Ledecky expanded her career World Championships medal haul to 22, passing Natalie Coughlin for most for a female swimmer. Ledecky earned FINA's female swimmer of the meet trophy for a third time.

On the first day of competition, Ledecky won the 400-meter freestyle in a championship record 3:58.15, besting Canadian silver medalist Summer McIntosh by 1.24 seconds. Ledecky's swim was the seventh-fastest performance in history. Ledecky won the 1500-meter freestyle two days later in a time of 15:30.15, over 14 seconds faster than runner-up and teammate Katie Grimes. Ledecky's time was the sixth-fastest ever (behind only her own performances) and over 7 seconds faster than her winning time at the Tokyo 2020 Olympics.

Ledecky joined Claire Weinstein, Leah Smith, and Bella Sims on the U.S. 4 × 200 freestyle relay on day five. Swimming the third leg, Ledecky passed Australia and Canada to take the lead with the third-fastest split in history (1:53.67). Sims anchored the team to a championship record time of 7:41.45. On day 7, Ledecky won her final event by over 10 seconds, recording a time of 8:08.04 in the 800-meter freestyle. The swim was the fifth-fastest in history and earned Ledecky the 28 fastest times in the distance. With the victory, Ledecky became the first swimmer, male or female, to win five consecutive world championship titles in an individual event.

==== 2022 USA Swimming Championships ====
At the 2022 USA Swimming Championships in Irvine, Ledecky won three gold medals by finishing first in the 200-meter freestyle (1:54.50), the 800-meter freestyle (8:12.03), and the 400-meter individual medley (4:35.77).

==== 2022 FINA Swimming World Cup ====
On October 29, during the Toronto round of the FINA Swimming World Cup, Ledecky swam the 1500m short course event for the first time. She set a time of 15:08.24, breaking the previous world record set by German swimmer Sarah Köhler by almost 10 seconds. The following week at the World Cup's Indianapolis stop, Ledecky broke the world record in the 800m short course freestyle. Her time of 7:57.42 surpassed Mireia Belmonte's mark from 2013.

=== 2023 ===
==== 2023 USA Swimming Championships ====
At the 2023 USA Swimming Championships in Indianapolis, Ledecky won three gold medals (400-, 800- and 1500-meter freestyle) and a silver medal (200-meter freestyle). Her times in the 800-meter freestyle (8:07.07) and 1500-meter freestyle (15:29.64) were the third- and sixth-fastest times in history, trailing only her own performances.

==== 2023 World Championships ====
2023 World Championships
Gold medal – first place	800 m freestyle	8:08.87
Gold medal – first place	1500 m freestyle	15:26.27
Silver medal – second place	400 m freestyle	3:58.73
Silver medal – second place	4 × 200 m freestyle	7:41.38

At the 2023 World Aquatics Championships in Fukuoka, Japan, Ledecky won two gold medals and two silver medals. Her 16th career individual gold medal surpassed Michael Phelps for most individual gold medals at the world championships. On the first day of competition, Ledecky placed second in the 400-meter freestyle to Ariarne Titmus, who set a new world record in the event (3:55.38). Ledecky's time of 3:58.73 topped New Zealand's Erika Fairweather (3:59.59) and Canada's Summer McIntosh (3:59.94) in the first women's 400-meter race that saw four swimmers break the 4-minute barrier. Two days later, Ledecky won the 1500-meter freestyle by over 17 seconds. Her time of 15:26.27 was the third-fastest time in history, trailing only her world and world championship records.

Ledecky joined Erin Gemmell, Bella Sims, and Alex Shackell to earn the silver medal in the 4 × 200 m freestyle relay. Ledecky swam the second leg and posted a team-best split of 1:54.39 as Australia lowered the world record by 1.79 seconds. Ledecky concluded her meet on Day 7 with the final of the 800-meter freestyle. Ledecky posted the sixth-fastest time in history (8:08.87) to top China's Li Bingjie by 4.44 seconds. Li and Ariarne Titmus became the second- and third-fastest performers ever in the event, while Ledecky retained the 29 fastest times in history. With the victory, Ledecky passed Michael Phelps as the swimmer with the most career individual world championship gold medals and became the first swimmer to win six-straight world titles in an event.

=== 2024 ===
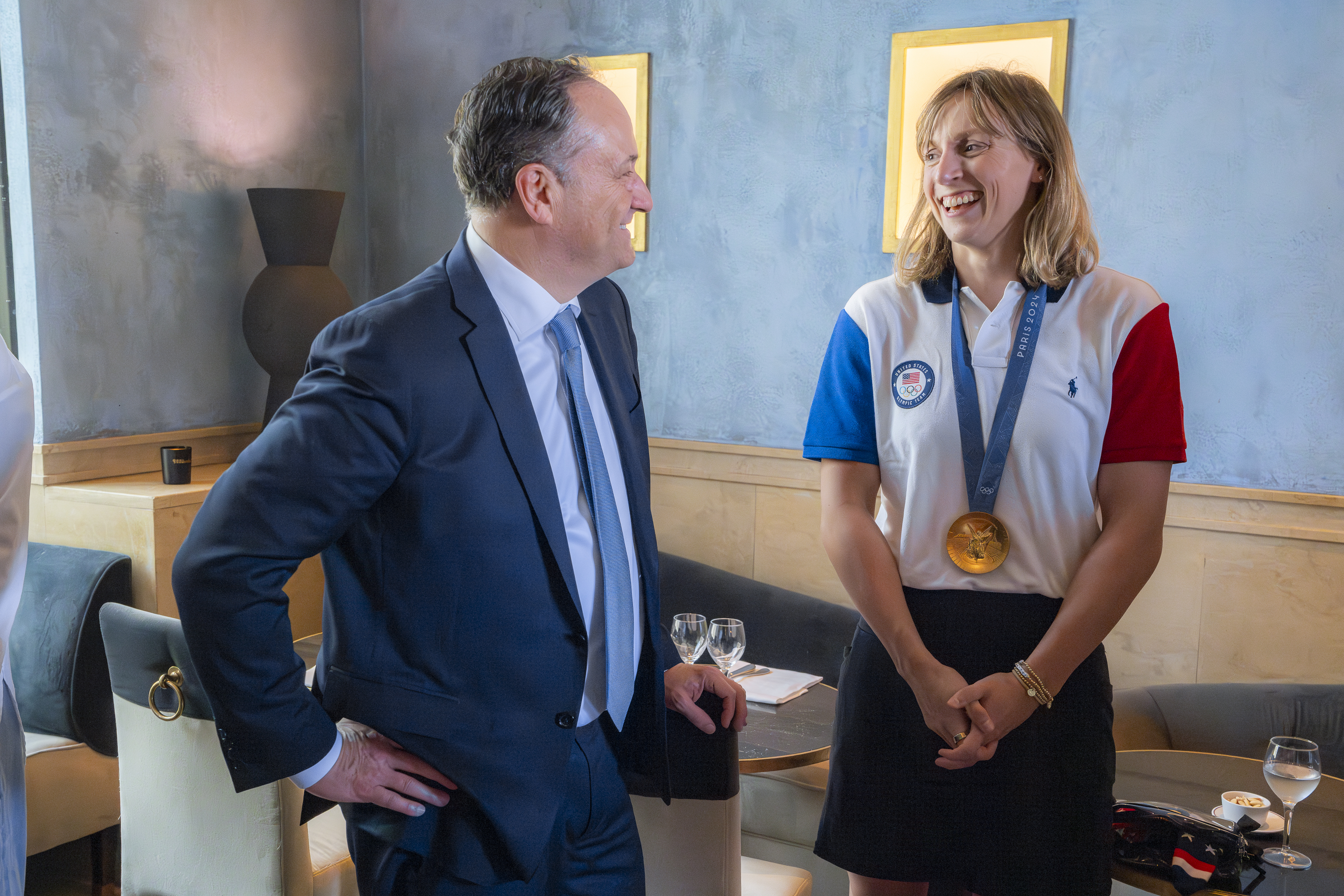
Ledecky (wearing a gold medal from the 2024 Summer Olympic Games) with U.S. Second Gentleman Doug Emhoff in August 2024

==== Memoir ====
Ledecky's memoir, Just Add Water, was published on June 11. In the book, she discloses that she has postural orthostatic tachycardia syndrome (POTS).

==== 2024 US Olympic trials ====
At the 2024 US Olympic trials, Ledecky qualified for her fourth Olympics. She finished in first place in four events: 200-meter freestyle (1:55.22), 400-meter freestyle (3:58.35), 800-meter freestyle (8:14.12), and 1500-meter freestyle (15:37.35).

==== 2024 Summer Olympic Games ====
2024 Summer Olympics
Gold medal – first place	800 m freestyle	8:11.04
Gold medal – first place	1500 m freestyle	15:30.02 (OR)
Silver medal – second place	4x200 m freestyle	7:40.86
Bronze medal – third place	400 m freestyle	4:00.86

On the first night of the 2024 Summer Olympics in Paris, Ledecky finished third in the 400-metre freestyle behind Ariarne Titmus and Summer McIntosh. Ledecky later defended her title in the 1500 metre freestyle event, setting the new Olympic record with a time of 15:30:02. She won her fourth consecutive gold medal and eighth individual gold (an all-time record for women at the Olympics, a new all-time record for women at the Olympics, the previous one set by gymnast Věra Čáslavská had stood for 56 years) in the 800 metre freestyle and also competed in the 4x200m freestyle relay, joined by Claire Weinstein, Paige Madden, and Erin Gemmell. With a collective time of 7:40.86, the team won the silver medal.

=== 2025 ===
Ledecky started 2025 with the TYR Swim Pro Series; and, on May 3, 2025, in Fort Lauderdale, she broke her own world record in the women's 800-metre freestyle, setting a new world record of 8:04.12.

==== 2025 USA Swimming Championships ====
At the 2025 USA Swimming Championships, she qualified for four events: the 400-m., the 800-m., and the 1500-m., as well as the 4×200 m freestyle relay.

==== 2025 World Championships ====
2025 World Aquatics Championships
Gold medal – first place	800 m freestyle	8:05.62 (CR)
Gold medal – first place	1500 m freestyle	15:26.44
Silver medal – second place	4x200 m freestyle	7:40.01 (AR)
Bronze medal – third place	400 m freestyle	3:58.49

At the 2025 World Aquatics Championships, held in Singapore, she won a bronze medal on July 27, at the 400 meter freestyle. Two nights later, on July 29, she earned gold in the 1500 meter freestyle. On July 31, she earned a silver medal as part of the 4 × 200 metre freestyle relay. Lastly, on the penultimate evening, August 2, she won gold in the 800 meter freestyle, beating out both Summer McIntosh and Lani Pallister and setting a new championship record, as well.

==== Katie Ledecky Invitational ====
In October 2025, the Nation's Capital Invitational, held annually in December, was renamed the Katie Ledecky Invitational in her honor. The meet is hosted by her former club team, the Nation's Capital Swim Club, on the campus of the University of Maryland, College Park at the Eppley Recreation Center Natatorium. As part of the renaming, Ledecky returned to swim in the meet where in 2015 she set an American record in the 1000-yard freestyle with a time of 8:59.65, becoming the first woman to swim a time under nine minutes in the event. In 2025, she entered the 1650-yard freestyle, where the American record previously stood at 15:01.43, set by Ledecky in March 2023. On December 14, she became the first woman to swim a time under fifteen minutes at 14:59.62, setting a new American and U.S. Open record.

=== 2026 ===
==== 2026 Pan Pacific Championships ====
2026 Pan Pacific Swimming Championships
Gold medal – first place	1500 m freestyle	15:36.06
Silver medal – second place	400 m freestyle	4:00.15
Silver medal – second place	800 m freestyle	8:07.26
Silver medal – second place	4x200 m freestyle	7:43.10

Ledecky earned her first gold of the 2026 Pan Pacific Swimming Championships in the 1500m with a time of 15:36.06. She also earned three silver medals for individual events, and another silver as part of the freestyle relay. Australian swimmer Lani Pallister defeated Ledecky in the 800-meter freestyle final. Pallister led wire-to-wire to finish in a championship record time of 8:06.10, holding off Ledecky (8:07.26). The victory marked the first time Ledecky was defeated in the 800m freestyle at a major international meet since her Olympic debut in 2012, ending a streak of 13 consecutive major international gold medals in the event.

== Honors and awards ==
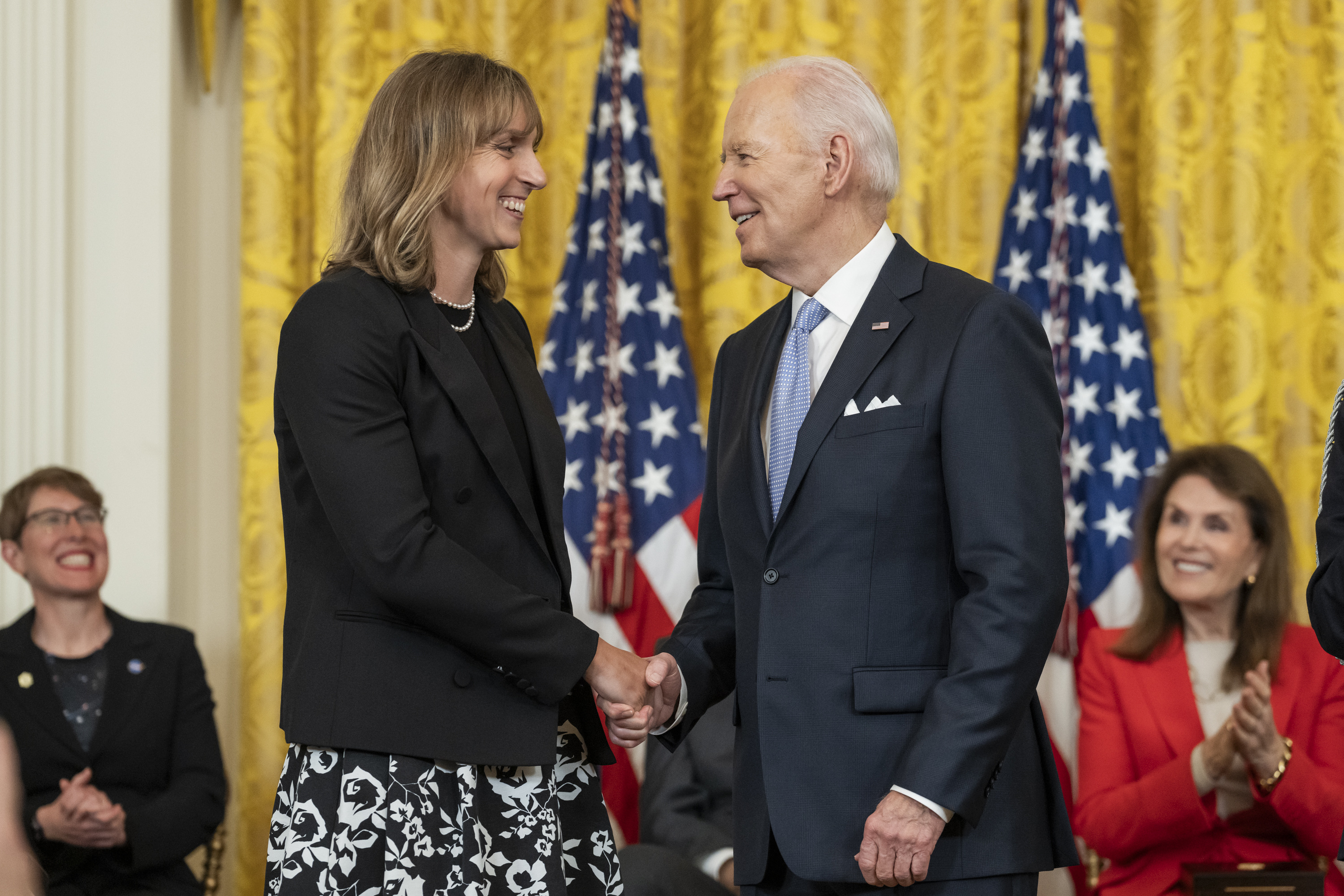
Ledecky with President Joe Biden after she accepted the Presidential Medal of Freedom in June 2024

Ledecky was a USA Olympic team member in 2012, 2016, 2020, and 2024. She also holds the women's record for most individual gold medals (18) and overall gold medals (23) at the World Aquatics Championships. Her combined 26 individual titles at the Olympics (8) and World Aquatics Championships (18) is also a record for female swimmers. Ledecky has also received the following awards:

- Swimming World World Swimmer of the Year Award: 2013, 2014, 2015, 2016, 2018
- Swimming World American Swimmer of the Year Award: 2013, 2014, 2015, 2016, 2017, 2018, 2021, 2022
- SwimSwam Top 100 (Women's): 2021 (#1), 2022 (#1)
- FINA World Championships Best Female Swimmer: 2013, 2015, 2022
- FINA Swimmer of the Year: 2013, 2022
- FINA Best Swimming Performance of the Year: 2015, 2016
- Associated Press Female Athlete of the Year: 2017, 2022
- L'Équipe Champion of Champions: 2014, 2017
- Time 100: 2016 (youngest person on the list)
- USOC SportsWoman of the Year: 2012–13, 2016, 2017
- USA Swimming Athlete of the Year: 2013, 2014, 2015, 2016, 2018
- USA Swimming Performance of the Year Award: 2012, 2013, 2014, 2015, 2016
- Golden Goggle Female Athlete of the Year: 2013, 2014, 2015, 2016, 2017, 2018, 2021, 2022, 2023, 2025
- Golden Goggle Female Race of the Year: 2012, 2013, 2014, 2015, 2022
- Golden Goggle Breakout Performer of the Year: 2012
- Honda Sports Award Winner for NCAA Division I Swimming and Diving: 2016–17
- Honda Cup Winner: 2016–17
- Women's Sports Foundation Athlete of the Year (Individual Sport): 2017
- Academic All-America Team Member of the Year, Division I: 2017–2018
- Best Female Athlete ESPY Award at the 2022 ESPY Awards
- Best Female Olympian ESPY Award at the 2022 ESPY Awards

Ledecky has also received the following honors:

- Presidential Medal of Freedom: 2024
- Golden Plate Award of the American Academy of Achievement: 2024 – presented by Cal Ripken Jr.
- In October 2024, Montgomery County executive Marc Elrich presented Ledecky with a proclamation declaring October 17 as "Katie Ledecky Day".
- In May 2026, she was awarded an honorary Doctor of Humane Letters by Yale University.

== Personal bests ==
As of May 3, 2025

=== Long course meters (50 m pool) ===
Event	Time		Meet	Location	Date	Notes
50 m freestyle	25.45	h	2015 Arena Pro Swim Series	Minneapolis, Minnesota, United States	November 12, 2015	
100 m freestyle	53.75		2016 Arena Pro Swim Series	Austin, Texas, United States	January 15, 2016	
200 m freestyle	1:53.73		2016 Summer Olympics	Rio de Janeiro, Brazil	August 9, 2016	
400 m freestyle	3:56.46		2016 Summer Olympics	Rio de Janeiro, Brazil	August 7, 2016	NR, Former WR
800 m freestyle	8:04.12		2025 TYR Pro Swim Series	Fort Lauderdale, Florida, United States	May 3, 2025	WR
1500 m freestyle	15:20.48		2018 TYR Pro Swim Series	Indianapolis, Indiana	May 16, 2018	WR
200 m butterfly	2:13.77	h	2023 TYR Pro Swim Series	Fort Lauderdale, Florida, United States	March 2, 2023	
200 m individual medley	2:12.67	h	2024 Atlanta Classic	Atlanta, Georgia, United States	May 18, 2024	
400 m individual medley	4:35.77		2022 U.S. National Championships	Irvine, California, United States	July 28, 2022	

Legend: WR – World record; NR – American record; e – equalled existing record;
Records not set in finals: h – heat; sf – semifinal; r – relay 1st leg; rh – relay heat 1st leg; b – B final; † – en route to final mark; so – swim-off; tt – time trial

=== Short course meters (25 m pool) ===
Event	Time	Meet	Location	Date	Notes
200 m freestyle	1:52.10	2022 World Cup	Indianapolis, Indiana, United States	November 4, 2022	
400 m freestyle	3:52.88	2022 World Cup	Toronto, Canada	October 28, 2022	NR
800 m freestyle	7:57.42	2022 World Cup	Indianapolis, Indiana, United States	November 5, 2022	AM, Former WR
1500 m freestyle	15:08.24	2022 World Cup	Toronto, Canada	October 29, 2022	WR
200 m butterfly	2:13.08	2013 Duel in the Pool	Glasgow, Scotland	December 21, 2013	
400 m individual medley	4:27.18	2019 International Swimming League	Indianapolis, Indiana, United States	October 5, 2019	

Legend: WR – World record; AM – Americas record; NR – American record; e – equalled existing record;
Records not set in finals: h – heat; sf – semifinal; r – relay 1st leg; rh – relay heat 1st leg; b – B final; † – en route to final mark; so – swim-off; tt – time trial

=== Short course yards (25 y pool) ===
Event	Time	Meet	Location	Date	Notes
200 y freestyle	1:40.36	2017 NCAA Division I Championships	Indianapolis, Indiana, United States	March 17, 2017	
500 y freestyle	4:24.06	2017 NCAA Division I Championships	Indianapolis, Indiana, United States	March 16, 2017	NR
1000 y freestyle	8:59.65	2015 Nation's Capital Invitational	College Park, Maryland, United States	December 13, 2015	NR
1650 y freestyle	14:59.62	2025 Katie Ledecky Inviational	College Park, Maryland, United States	December 14, 2025	NR
400 y individual medley	3:56.53	2018 Pac-12 Championships	Federal Way, Washington, United States	February 23, 2018	Former NR

Legend: NR – American record; e – equalled existing record;
Records not set in finals: h – heat; sf – semifinal; r – relay 1st leg; rh – relay heat 1st leg; b – B final; † – en route to final mark; so – swim-off; tt – time trial

== World records ==
=== Long course (50 m pool) ===
No.	Event	Time	Meet	Location	Date	Age
1	1500 m freestyle (1)	15:36.53	2013 World Championships	Barcelona, Spain	July 30, 2013	16
2	800 m freestyle (1)	8:13.86	2013 World Championships	Barcelona, Spain	August 3, 2013	16
3	1500 m freestyle (2)	15:34.23	2014 TWST Senior Invitational	Shenandoah, Texas	June 19, 2014	17
4	800 m freestyle (2)	8:11.00	2014 TWST Senior Invitational	Shenandoah, Texas	June 22, 2014	17
5	400 m freestyle (1)	3:58.86	2014 U.S. National Championships	Irvine, California	August 9, 2014	17
6	400 m freestyle (2)	3:58.37	2014 Pan Pacific Championships	Gold Coast, Australia	August 23, 2014	17
7	1500 m freestyle (3)	15:28.36	2014 Pan Pacific Championships	Gold Coast, Australia	August 24, 2014	17
8	1500 m freestyle (4)	15:27.71	2015 World Championships	Kazan, Russia	August 3, 2015	18
9	1500 m freestyle (5)	15:25.48	2015 World Championships	Kazan, Russia	August 4, 2015	18
10	800 m freestyle (3)	8:07.39	2015 World Championships	Kazan, Russia	August 8, 2015	18
11	800 m freestyle (4)	8:06.68	2016 Arena Pro Swim Series	Austin, Texas	January 17, 2016	18
12	400 m freestyle (3)	3:56.46	2016 Summer Olympics	Rio de Janeiro, Brazil	August 7, 2016	19
13	800 m freestyle (5)	8:04.79	2016 Summer Olympics	Rio de Janeiro, Brazil	August 12, 2016	19
14	1500 m freestyle (6)	15:20.48	2018 TYR Pro Swim Series	Indianapolis, Indiana	May 16, 2018	21
15	800 m freestyle (6)	8:04.12	2025 TYR Pro Swim Series	Fort Lauderdale, Florida	May 3, 2025	28

=== Short course (25 m pool) ===
No.	Event	Time	Meet	Location	Date	Age
1	1500 m freestyle	15:08.24	2022 World Cup	Toronto, Canada	October 29, 2022	25
2	800 m freestyle	7:57.42	2022 World Cup	Indianapolis, Indiana, United States	November 5, 2022	25

== Publications ==
=== Books ===
- Author, Just Add Water: My Swimming Life. 2024. Simon & Schuster

== See also ==
- List of Olympic medalists in swimming (women)
- List of multiple Olympic gold medalists
- List of select Jewish swimmers
- List of top Olympic gold medalists in swimming
- List of World Aquatics Championships medalists in swimming (women)
- List of individual gold medalists in swimming at the Olympics and World Aquatics Championships (women)
- List of world records in swimming
- World record progression 400 metres freestyle
- World record progression 800 metres freestyle
- World record progression 1500 metres freestyle
- List of USOC Athlete of the Year award winners
- List of Associated Press Athletes of the Year

Records
Preceded by Kate Ziegler	Women's 1500-meter freestyle world record-holder (long course); July 30, 2013 – present	Succeeded by Incumbent
Preceded by Rebecca Adlington	Women's 800-meter freestyle world record-holder (long course); August 3, 2013 – present	Succeeded by Incumbent
Preceded by Federica Pellegrini	Women's 400-meter freestyle world record-holder (long course); August 9, 2014 – May 22, 2022	Succeeded by Ariarne Titmus
Preceded by Sarah Köhler	Women's 1500-meter freestyle world record-holder (short course); October 29, 2022 – present	Succeeded by Incumbent
Preceded by Mireia Belmonte	Women's 800-meter freestyle world record-holder (short course); November 5, 2022 – present	Succeeded by Incumbent
Awards
Preceded by Missy Franklin; Sarah Sjöström	Swimming World; World Swimmer of the Year; 2013–2016; 2018	Succeeded by Sarah Sjöström; Regan Smith
Preceded by Missy Franklin; Emma McKeon	FINA Swimmer of the Year; 2013, 2022	Succeeded by Katinka Hosszú
Preceded by Missy Franklin; Regan Smith	Swimming World; American Swimmer of the Year; 2013–2018; 2021–2022	Succeeded by Regan Smith; Incumbent
Preceded by Allyson Felix; Simone Biles	USOC Sportswoman of the Year; 2012–13; 2016–2017	Succeeded by Simone Biles; Chloe Kim
Preceded by Serena Williams; Simone Biles	L'Équipe Champion of Champions; 2014; 2017	Succeeded by Serena Williams; Simone Biles
Preceded by Simone Biles; Candace Parker	Associated Press Athlete of the Year; 2017; 2022	Succeeded by Serena Williams; Simone Biles
