= 2014 Pan Pacific Swimming Championships – Women's 200 metre freestyle =

Women's 200 metre freestyle at the 2014 Pan Pacific Swimming Championships
- Venue: Gold Coast Aquatic Centre
- Dates: 21 August 2014
- Competitors: 34 from 8 nations
- Winning time: 1:55.74 CR

Medalists
gold medal	Katie Ledecky	United States
silver medal	Bronte Barratt	Australia
bronze medal	Shannon Vreeland	United States

The women's 200 metre freestyle event at the 2014 Pan Pacific Swimming Championships took place on 21 August at the Gold Coast Aquatic Centre in Gold Coast, Australia.

== Records ==
Prior to this competition, the existing world and championship records were:

World record	Federica Pellegrini (ITA)	1:52.98	Rome, Italy	29 July 2009
Competition record	Allison Schmitt (USA)	1:56.10	Irvine, California, United States	18 August 2010

The following records were established during the competition:

Date	Event	Name	Nationality	Time	Record
21 August	B Final	Missy Franklin	United States	1:56.04	CR
21 August	A Final	Katie Ledecky	United States	1:55.74	CR

== Results ==
=== Heats ===
Rank	Heat	Lane	Name	Nationality	Time	Notes
1	4	4	Katie Ledecky	United States	1:56.45	QA
2	5	3	Melanie Schlanger	Australia	1:57.16	QA
3	4	5	Shannon Vreeland	United States	1:57.40	QA
4	5	4	Missy Franklin	United States	1:57.63	QB
5	5	5	Bronte Barratt	Australia	1:57.65	QA
6	3	4	Emma McKeon	Australia	1:57.87	QB
7	4	3	Leah Smith	United States	1:58.20	
8	3	5	Brittany Elmslie	Australia	1:58.35	
9	4	2	Elizabeth Beisel	United States	1:58.66	
10	3	6	Simone Manuel	United States	1:58.77	
11	3	3	Samantha Cheverton	Canada	1:58.80	QA
12	5	7	Sishi Zhang	China	1:59.45	QA
13	3	2	Melanie Margalis	United States	1:59.60	
14	5	6	Chihiro Igarashi	Japan	1:59.96	QA
15	3	1	Yasuko Miyamoto	Japan	2:00.17	QA
16	5	1	Alyson Ackman	Canada	2:00.43	QB
17	4	6	Samantha Lucie-Smith	New Zealand	2:00.52	QB
18	2	7	Camille Cheng	Hong Kong	2:00.66	QB
19	5	8	Aya Takano	Japan	2:00.93	QB
20	2	6	Misaki Yamaguchi	Japan	2:01.02	
21	3	7	Yayoi Matsumoto	Japan	2:02.04	
22	5	2	Kanako Watanabe	Japan	2:02.13	
23	2	1	Rika Omoyo	Japan	2:02.60	
24	2	5	Tabitha Baumann	Canada	2:02.79	QB
25	2	2	Sze Hang Yu	Hong Kong	2:02.93	QB
26	2	4	Wang Shijia	China	2:03.05	
27	4	8	Jessica Ashwood	Australia	2:03.09	
28	2	3	Miki Uchida	Japan	2:03.60	
29	4	7	Liu Yiru	China	2:03.80	
30	4	1	Emma Robinson	New Zealand	2:04.51	
31	3	8	Zhou Min	China	2:05.69	
32	1	4	Chan Kin Lok	Hong Kong	2:08.38	
33	1	5	Heather Cheng	Hong Kong	2:11.10	
	1	3	Marce Loubser	South Africa		DNS

=== B Final ===
Rank	Lane	Name	Nationality	Time	Notes
9	4	Missy Franklin	United States	1:56.04	CR
10	5	Emma McKeon	Australia	1:57.21	
11	2	Camille Cheng	Hong Kong	1:58.99	
12	3	Alyson Ackman	Canada	1:59.25	
13	6	Samantha Lucie-Smith	New Zealand	2:00.75	
14	7	Aya Takano	Japan	2:00.90	
15	8	Sze Hang Yu	Hong Kong	2:02.65	
16	1	Tabitha Baumann	Canada	2:03.25	

=== A Final ===
Rank	Lane	Name	Nationality	Time	Notes
1st place, gold medalist(s)	4	Katie Ledecky	United States	1:55.74	CR
2nd place, silver medalist(s)	6	Bronte Barratt	Australia	1:57.22	
3rd place, bronze medalist(s)	3	Shannon Vreeland	United States	1:57.38	
4	5	Melanie Schlanger	Australia	1:57.39	
5	2	Samantha Cheverton	Canada	1:58.96	
6	1	Chihiro Igarashi	Japan	1:59.08	
7	7	Sishi Zhang	China	1:59.29	
8	8	Yasuko Miyamoto	Japan	1:59.94	
