= Kate Sanderson =

Canadian swimmer (born 2000)

Personal information
- Full name: Kate Farley Sanderson
- Born: 1 March 2000 (age 26) Toronto, Ontario, Canada
- Height: 158 cm (5 ft 2 in)
- Weight: 54 kg (119 lb)

Sport
- Sport: Swimming
- Coach: Brad Dingey

Kate Farley Sanderson (born 1 March 2000) is a Canadian swimmer. She competed in the women's 5 km and women's 10 km events at the 2019 World Aquatics Championships held in Gwangju, South Korea. In the 5 km event she finished in 24th place and in the 10 km event she finished in 35th place. In 2019, she also competed in the women's marathon 10 kilometres at the Pan American Games held in Lima, Peru and she finished in 6th place.

In 2018, Sanderson finished in 10th place in the women's 10 kilometre open water at the Pan Pacific Swimming Championships in Tokyo, Japan. She also competed in the women's 800 metre freestyle and women's 1500 metre freestyle events.

Sanderson represented Canada at the 2020 Summer Olympics in Tokyo, Japan in the women's marathon 10 kilometre event. She finished in 18th place.
