= 2014 Pan Pacific Swimming Championships – Women's 1500 metre freestyle =

Women's 1500 metre freestyle at the 2014 Pan Pacific Swimming Championships
- Venue: Gold Coast Aquatic Centre
- Dates: August 24, 2014 (heats & finals)
- Competitors: 8
- Winning time: 15:28.36

Medalists
gold medal	Katie Ledecky	United States
silver medal	Lauren Boyle	New Zealand
bronze medal	Brittany MacLean	Canada

The women's 1500 metre freestyle competition at the 2014 Pan Pacific Swimming Championships took place on August 24 at the Gold Coast Aquatic Centre. The last champion was Melissa Gorman of Australia.

This event was a timed-final where each swimmer swam just once. The top 8 seeded swimmers swam in the evening, and the remaining swimmers swam in the morning session.

== Records ==
Prior to this competition, the existing world and Pan Pacific records were as follows:

World record	Katie Ledecky (USA)	15:34.23	Shenandoah, United States	June 19, 2014
Pan Pacific Championships record	Kate Ziegler (USA)	15:55.01	Victoria, Canada	August 17, 2006

== Results ==
All times are in minutes and seconds.

KEY:	q	Fastest non-qualifiers	Q	Qualified	CR	Championships record	NR	National record	PB	Personal best	SB	Seasonal best

The first and final round were held on August 24, at 19:31.

Rank	Name	Nationality	Time	Notes
1st place, gold medalist(s)	Katie Ledecky	United States	15:28.36	WR
2nd place, silver medalist(s)	Lauren Boyle	New Zealand	15:55.69	
3rd place, bronze medalist(s)	Brittany MacLean	Canada	15:57.15	
4	Cierra Runge	United States	16:04.48	
5	Kristel Köbrich	Chile	16:30.74	
6	Chihi Igarashi	Japan	16:34.09	
7	Miho Takahashi	Japan	16:39.26	
8	Emma Robinson	New Zealand	16:44.88	
