= Aya Takano (swimmer) =

Japanese swimmer (born 1994)

Personal information
- Nationality: Japan
- Born: 14 March 1994 (age 32) Ibaraki, Osaka, Japan
- Height: 1.64 m (5 ft 5 in)
- Weight: 54 kg (119 lb)

Sport
- Sport: Swimming
- Strokes: Freestyle
Medal record
Women's swimming
Representing Japan
Summer Universiade
Bronze medal – third place	2015 Gwangju	4×200 m freestyle

Aya Takano (高野 綾, Takano Aya; born May 14, 1994) is a Japanese swimmer, who was selected to the national team to qualify for the 2012 Summer Olympics in London, after having accepted an invitation from FINA, based on her B-standard time. She competed in the women's 400 m freestyle, where she placed twenty-sixth in the heats, with a time of 4:12.33. She also joined the women's national team for the women's freestyle relay events, where she and her teammates finished in seventh and eighth place, respectively.

Takano is a sports science student at Doshisha University in Kyoto, Japan, and is currently a member of Itoman Club, being trained by Masato Nishiwaki.
