= Mikkayla Sheridan =

Australian swimmer

Personal information
- Nationality: Australian
- Born: 20 January 1995 (age 31)

Sport
- Sport: Swimming
- Strokes: Freestyle
Medal record
Representing Australia
Pan Pacific Championships
Gold medal – first place	2018 Tokyo	4×200 m freestyle
Junior Pan Pacific Championships
Silver medal – second place	2012 Honolulu	4×200 m freestyle

Mikkayla Sheridan (born 20 January 1995) is an Australian swimmer. She won gold in the women's 4 × 200 m freestyle event at the 2018 Pan Pacific Swimming Championships. In the Autumn of 2019, she was member of the inaugural International Swimming League swimming for the New York Breakers, who competed in the Americas Division.
