= Nicole Oliva =

Filipino swimmer

Personal information
- Full name: Nicole Justine Oliva
- National team: Philippines
- Born: 20 December 2001 (age 24)

Sport
- Sport: Swimming
- Strokes: Freestyle
Medal record
Representing Philippines
SEA Games
Silver medal – second place	2017 Kuala Lumpur	4x200m freestyle relay

Nicole Justine Oliva (born 20 December 2001) is a Filipino swimmer. She competed in the women's 200 metre freestyle event at the 2017 World Aquatics Championships. and the at women's 400 metre freestyle the 2019 edition of the same tournament

== Early career ==
A native of Santa Clara, California, Oliva was taught on swimming by a lifeguard for a decade in Cebu City in the Philippines which her family often frequented in her early years.

Oliva as a swimmer for Saint Francis High School, is a four-time CIF State Championship finalist and a three-time CIF-Central Coast Section champion. In 2019, she committed to swim for the swimming team of University of California, Berkeley starting the 2020–21 season.

== International career ==
Oliva was one of the competitors for the Philippines at the 2018 Summer Youth Olympics in Buenos Aires. She finished sixth in the girls' 400 metre freestyle final and seventh in the girls' 200 metre freestyle final. She also had year-long training at the Santa Clara Swim Club. Oliva also swam in the heats of girls' 100 metre and girls' 800 metre freestyle.
