= Mackenzie Padington =

Canadian swimmer (born 1999)

Personal information
- Full name: Mackenzie Margaret Carol Padington
- Born: 2 March 1999 (age 27)
- Height: 180 cm (5 ft 11 in)

Sport
- Sport: Swimming
- Club: High Performance Centre - Vancouver
- Coach: Tom Johnson
Medal record
Pan Pacific Championships
Bronze medal – third place	2018 Tokyo	4×200 m freestyle

Mackenzie Margaret Carol Padington (born 2 March 1999) is a Canadian swimmer. She competed in the women's 400 metre freestyle event at the 2017 World Aquatics Championships. In 2019, she represented Canada at the 2019 World Aquatics Championships held in Gwangju, South Korea. She competed in the women's 400 metre freestyle and women's 800 metre freestyle events. In both events she did not advance to compete in the final.
