= Mineri Gomez =

Guamanian swimmer (born 2001)

Personal information
- Full name: Mineri Kurotori Gomez
- Born: April 14, 2001 (age 25)

Sport
- Sport: Swimming
- Strokes: Freestyle, backstroke

Mineri Kurotori Gomez (born April 14, 2001) is a Guamanian swimmer competing in the 100 meter freestyle at the 2020 Summer Olympics. She swam the 100 and 200 meter freestyle at the 2019 World Aquatics Championships and the 100 meter freestyle and 100 meter butterfly at the 2017 World Aquatics Championships.
