= Swimming at the 2004 Summer Olympics =

Swimming at the Games of the XXVIII Olympiad
- Venue: Athens Olympic Aquatic Centre
- Dates: 14 – 21 August 2004
- Competitors: 937 from 152 nations

The swimming competitions at the 2004 Summer Olympics in Athens took place from 14 to 21 August 2004 at the Athens Olympic Aquatic Centre in Marousi. It featured 32 events (16 male, 16 female), a total of 937 swimmers from 152 nations, and the program's changes instituted in the previous Games, including notably the three-phase format (heats, semifinals, and final) for all short-distance races (200 metres and under).

Swimmers from the United States continued to dominate the medal tally with a total of 28, earning twelve golds, nine silver, and seven bronze. Australia still maintained the second spot from Sydney in 2000, but produced a total of 15 more medals (seven golds, five silver, and three bronze) to its historical hardware in swimming. Meanwhile, Japan moved from behind to third overall in the medal board with eight medals after a sterling breaststroke double from Kosuke Kitajima. A total of eight world records and twenty-five Olympic records were set during the competition.

== Venue ==
Grandstand view of the swimming pool at the Athens Olympic Aquatic Centre during the 2004 Summer Olympics.

Swimming events at the 2004 Summer Olympics were held at the Athens Olympic Aquatic Centre, officially known as the Olympic Aquatic Centre of the Athens Olympic Sports Complex (OCO) during the games. Originally built for the 1991 Mediterranean Games, it was refurbished to host swimming, diving, synchronised swimming, and water polo events; it was the first time in the history of the Olympics that all aquatics disciplines had been held at a single venue. Swimming events were held at the main outdoor pool of the complex, which held 10,893 spectators, and was interchangeably used for swimming and water polo events throughout the duration of the games. A plastic-coated tarpaulin roof covering the two outdoor pools of the complex, designed to protect spectators and swimmers from being exposed to the summer heat, was originally planned to be built as part of the renovations. However, due to cost overruns and delays in construction, planners decided to scrap the roof in March 2004, which was criticised by FINA, the governing body of water sports. The venue would ultimately be approved by FINA weeks before the opening of the games in August.

== Events ==
The following events were contested (all pool events were long course, and distances are in metres unless stated):

- Freestyle : 50, 100, 200, 400, 800 (women) and 1500 (men);
- Backstroke : 100 and 200;
- Breaststroke : 100 and 200;
- Butterfly : 100 and 200;
- Individual medley : 200 and 400;
- Relays: 4 × 100 free, 4 × 200 free, and 4 × 100 medley.

=== Schedule ===
Legend
H	Heats	½	Semi-finals	F	Final

Men
Date →	Aug 14		Aug 15		Aug 16		Aug 17		Aug 18		Aug 19		Aug 20		Aug 21	
Event ↓	M	E	M	E	M	E	M	E	M	E	M	E	M	E	M	E
50 m freestyle											H	½		F		
100 m freestyle							H	½		F						
200 m freestyle			H	½		F										
400 m freestyle	H	F														
1500 m freestyle													H			F
100 m backstroke			H	½		F										
200 m backstroke									H	½		F				
100 m breaststroke	H	½		F												
200 m breaststroke							H	½		F						
100 m butterfly											H	½		F		
200 m butterfly					H	½		F								
200 m individual medley									H	½		F				
400 m individual medley	H	F														
4 × 100 m freestyle relay			H	F												
4 × 200 m freestyle relay							H	F								
4 × 100 m medley relay													H			F

Women
Date →	Aug 14		Aug 15		Aug 16		Aug 17		Aug 18		Aug 19		Aug 20		Aug 21	
Event ↓	M	E	M	E	M	E	M	E	M	E	M	E	M	E	M	E
50 m freestyle													H	½		F
100 m freestyle									H	½		F				
200 m freestyle					H	½		F								
400 m freestyle			H	F												
800 m freestyle											H			F		
100 m backstroke			H	½		F										
200 m backstroke											H	½		F		
100 m breaststroke			H	½		F										
200 m breaststroke									H	½		F				
100 m butterfly	H	½		F												
200 m butterfly							H	½		F						
200 m individual medley					H	½		F								
400 m individual medley	H	F														
4 × 100 m freestyle relay	H	F														
4 × 200 m freestyle relay									H	F						
4 × 100 m medley relay													H			F

== Participating nations ==
A total of 937 swimmers (544 men and 393 women) from 152 nations would compete in swimming events at these Olympic Games. Antigua and Barbuda, Benin, Burkina Faso, Burundi, Cameroon, Cayman Islands, Guyana, and Turkmenistan made their official debut in swimming. Meanwhile, Albania, Libyan Arab Jamahiriya and Norway returned to the sport after long years of absence. Nations with swimmers at the Games are (team size in parentheses):

- Albania (2)
- Algeria (6)
- Andorra (2)
- Angola (1)
- Antigua and Barbuda (2)
- Argentina (10)
- Armenia (1)
- Aruba (2)
- Australia (41)
- Austria (6)
- Azerbaijan (2)
- Bahamas (4)
- Bahrain (2)
- Bangladesh (2)
- Barbados (4)
- Belarus (9)
- Benin (2)
- Bermuda (1)
- Bolivia (2)
- Bosnia and Herzegovina (1)
- Brazil (23)
- Bulgaria (6)
- Burkina Faso (1)
- Burundi (2)
- Cambodia (2)
- Cameroon (1)
- Canada (20)
- Cayman Islands (3)
- Chile (3)
- China (28)
- Colombia (3)
- Republic of the Congo (2)
- Costa Rica (1)
- Ivory Coast (2)
- Croatia (13)
- Cuba (2)
- Cyprus (5)
- Czech Republic (12)
- Denmark (6)
- Ecuador (1)
- Egypt (2)
- El Salvador (1)
- Estonia (6)
- Fiji (1)
- Finland (7)
- France (21)
- Germany (35)
- Georgia (1)
- Great Britain (33)
- Greece (28)
- Grenada (2)
- Guam (1)
- Guatemala (4)
- Guinea (1)
- Guyana (1)
- Honduras (2)
- Hong Kong (7)
- Hungary (25)
- Iceland (7)
- India (1)
- Indonesia (3)
- Iran (1)
- Iraq (1)
- Ireland (2)
- Israel (2)
- Italy (29)
- Jamaica (4)
- Japan (20)
- Jordan (2)
- Kazakhstan (11)
- Kenya (2)
- South Korea (19)
- Kyrgyzstan (6)
- Laos (2)
- Latvia (5)
- Lebanon (2)
- Libya (2)
- Lithuania (10)
- Luxembourg (2)
- Macedonia (4)
- Madagascar (2)
- Malawi (2)
- Malaysia (4)
- Maldives (2)
- Mali (2)
- Malta (2)
- Mauritius (2)
- Mexico (6)
- Federated States of Micronesia (2)
- Moldova (10)
- Monaco (1)
- Mongolia (1)
- Morocco (1)
- Mozambique (2)
- Nepal (2)
- Netherlands (16)
- New Zealand (13)
- Nicaragua (2)
- Niger (1)
- Nigeria (2)
- Norway (1)
- Pakistan (2)
- Palau (1)
- Palestine (1)
- Panama (2)
- Papua New Guinea (1)
- Paraguay (1)
- Peru (2)
- Philippines (5)
- Poland (7)
- Portugal (11)
- Puerto Rico (6)
- Qatar (1)
- Romania (7)
- Russia (30)
- Rwanda (2)
- Saint Lucia (1)
- Saint Vincent and the Grenadines (1)
- San Marino (2)
- Saudi Arabia (1)
- Senegal (2)
- Serbia and Montenegro (7)
- Seychelles (2)
- Singapore (5)
- Slovakia (2)
- Slovenia (11)
- South Africa (8)
- Spain (16)
- Sri Lanka (2)
- Suriname (2)
- Swaziland (1)
- Sweden (15)
- Switzerland (13)
- Syria (1)
- Chinese Taipei (13)
- Thailand (6)
- Trinidad and Tobago (3)
- Tunisia (2)
- Turkey (9)
- Turkmenistan (2)
- Uganda (1)
- Ukraine (27)
- United Arab Emirates (1)
- United States (43)
- Uruguay (4)
- Uzbekistan (15)
- Venezuela (4)
- Vietnam (1)
- Virgin Islands (2)
- Yemen (1)
- Zambia (2)
- Zimbabwe (2)

== Medal summary ==
Rank	Nation	Gold	Silver	Bronze	Total
1	United States	12	9	7	28
2	Australia	7	5	3	15
3	Japan	3	1	4	8
4	Netherlands	2	3	2	7
5	Ukraine	2	0	1	3
6	France	1	2	3	6
7	Poland	1	2	0	3
8	South Africa	1	1	1	3
8	Zimbabwe	1	1	1	3
10	China	1	1	0	2
11	Romania	1	0	1	2
12	Austria	0	2	0	2
13	Germany	0	1	4	5
14	Hungary	0	1	1	2
14	Italy	0	1	1	2
16	Croatia	0	1	0	1
16	Russia	0	1	0	1
18	Great Britain	0	0	2	2
19	Argentina	0	0	1	1
19	Trinidad and Tobago	0	0	1	1
Totals (20 entries)		32	32	33	97

== Results ==
=== Men's events ===
Games	Gold		Silver		Bronze	
50 m freestyle	Gary Hall, Jr. United States	21.93	Duje Draganja; Croatia	21.94; NR	Roland Schoeman; South Africa	22.02
100 m freestyle	Pieter van den Hoogenband; Netherlands	48.17	Roland Schoeman; South Africa	48.23	Ian Thorpe; Australia	48.56
200 m freestyle	Ian Thorpe; Australia	1:44.71; OR	Pieter van den Hoogenband; Netherlands	1:45.23	Michael Phelps; United States	1:45.32; AM
400 m freestyle	Ian Thorpe; Australia	3:43.10	Grant Hackett; Australia	3:43.36	Klete Keller; United States	3:44.11; AM
1500 m freestyle	Grant Hackett; Australia	14:43.40; OR	Larsen Jensen; United States	14:45.29; AM	David Davies; Great Britain	14:45.95; ER
100 m backstroke	Aaron Peirsol; United States	54.06	Markus Rogan; Austria	54.35	Tomomi Morita; Japan	54.36; AS
200 m backstroke	Aaron Peirsol; United States	1:54.95; OR	Markus Rogan; Austria	1:57.35	Răzvan Florea; Romania	1:57.56; NR
100 m breaststroke	Kosuke Kitajima; Japan	1:00.08	Brendan Hansen; United States	1:00.25	Hugues Duboscq; France	1:00.88
200 m breaststroke	Kosuke Kitajima; Japan	2:09.44; OR	Dániel Gyurta; Hungary	2:10.80	Brendan Hansen; United States	2:10.87
100 m butterfly	Michael Phelps; United States	51.25; OR	Ian Crocker; United States	51.29	Andriy Serdinov; Ukraine	51.36; ER
200 m butterfly	Michael Phelps; United States	1:54.04; OR	Takashi Yamamoto; Japan	1:54.56; AS	Stephen Parry; Great Britain	1:55.52; NR
200 m individual medley	Michael Phelps; United States	1:57.14; OR	Ryan Lochte; United States	1:58.78	George Bovell; Trinidad and Tobago	1:58.80; NR
400 m individual medley	Michael Phelps; United States	4:08.26; WR	Erik Vendt; United States	4:11.81	László Cseh; Hungary	4:12.15
4 × 100 m freestyle relay	South Africa; Roland Schoeman (48.17) AF; Lyndon Ferns (48.13); Darian Townsend (48.96); Ryk Neethling (47.91)	3:13.17; WR	Netherlands; Johan Kenkhuis (49.81); Mitja Zastrow (49.25); Klaas-Erik Zwering (48.51); Pieter van den Hoogenband (46.79); Mark Veens*	3:14.36; NR	United States; Ian Crocker (50.05); Michael Phelps (48.74); Neil Walker 47.97); Jason Lezak (47.86); Nate Dusing*; Gary Hall, Jr.* Gabe Woodward*	3:14.62
4 × 200 m freestyle relay	United States; Michael Phelps (1:46.49); Ryan Lochte (1:47.52); Peter Vanderkaay (1:47.79); Klete Keller (1:45.53); Scott Goldblatt*; Dan Ketchum*	7:07.33; AM	Australia; Grant Hackett (1:47.50); Michael Klim (1:47.62); Nicholas Sprenger (1:48.16); Ian Thorpe (1:44.18); Antony Matkovich*; Todd Pearson*; Craig Stevens*	7:07.46	Italy; Emiliano Brembilla (1:48.16); Massimiliano Rosolino (1:46.24); Simone Cercato (1:49.85); Filippo Magnini (1:47.58); Federico Cappellazzo*; Matteo Pelliciari*	7:11.83
4 × 100 m medley relay	United States; Aaron Peirsol (53.45) WR; Brendan Hansen (59.37); Ian Crocker (50.28); Jason Lezak (47.58); Lenny Krayzelburg*; Mark Gangloff*; Michael Phelps*; Neil Walker*	3:30.68; WR	Germany; Steffen Driesen (54.26); Jens Kruppa (1:00.50); Thomas Rupprath (51.40); Lars Conrad (47.46); Helge Meeuw*	3:33.62; ER	Japan; Tomomi Morita (54.25) AS; Kosuke Kitajima (59.35); Takashi Yamamoto (51.87); Yoshihiro Okumura (49.75)	3:35.22; AS

* Swimmers who participated in the heats only and received medals.

=== Women's events ===
Games	Gold		Silver		Bronze	
50 m freestyle	Inge de Bruijn; Netherlands	24.58	Malia Metella; France	24.89; NR	Lisbeth Lenton; Australia	24.91
100 m freestyle	Jodie Henry; Australia	53.84	Inge de Bruijn; Netherlands	54.16	Natalie Coughlin; United States	54.40
200 m freestyle	Camelia Potec; Romania	1:58.03	Federica Pellegrini; Italy	1:58.22	Solenne Figuès; France	1:58.45
400 m freestyle	Laure Manaudou; France	4:05.34; ER	Otylia Jędrzejczak; Poland	4:05.84	Kaitlin Sandeno; United States	4:06.19
800 m freestyle	Ai Shibata; Japan	8:24.54	Laure Manaudou; France	8:24.96	Diana Munz; United States	8:26.61
100 m backstroke	Natalie Coughlin; United States	1:00.37	Kirsty Coventry; Zimbabwe	1:00.50	Laure Manaudou; France	1:00.88
200 m backstroke	Kirsty Coventry; Zimbabwe	2:09.19; AF	Stanislava Komarova; Russia	2:09.72	Antje Buschschulte; Germany; Reiko Nakamura; Japan	2:09.88
100 m breaststroke	Luo Xuejuan; China	1:06.64; OR	Brooke Hanson; Australia	1:07.15	Leisel Jones; Australia	1:07.16
200 m breaststroke	Amanda Beard; United States	2:23.37; OR	Leisel Jones; Australia	2:23.60	Anne Poleska; Germany	2:25.82
100 m butterfly	Petria Thomas; Australia	57.72	Otylia Jędrzejczak; Poland	57.84	Inge de Bruijn; Netherlands	57.99
200 m butterfly	Otylia Jędrzejczak; Poland	2:06.05	Petria Thomas; Australia	2:06.36	Yuko Nakanishi; Japan	2:08.04
200 m individual medley	Yana Klochkova; Ukraine	2:11.14	Amanda Beard; United States	2:11.70; AM	Kirsty Coventry; Zimbabwe	2:12.72; AF
400 m individual medley	Yana Klochkova; Ukraine	4:34.83	Kaitlin Sandeno; United States	4:34.95; AM	Georgina Bardach; Argentina	4:37.51; SA
4 × 100 m freestyle relay	Australia; Alice Mills; Lisbeth Lenton; Petria Thomas; Jodie Henry; Sarah Ryan*	3:35.94; WR	United States; Kara Lynn Joyce; Natalie Coughlin; Amanda Weir; Jenny Thompson; Lindsay Benko*; Maritza Correia*; Colleen Lanne*	3:36.39; AM	Netherlands; Chantal Groot; Inge Dekker; Marleen Veldhuis; Inge de Bruijn; Annabel Kosten*	3:37.59; NR
4 × 200 m freestyle relay	United States; Natalie Coughlin; Carly Piper; Dana Vollmer; Kaitlin Sandeno; Lindsay Benko*; Rhi Jeffrey*; Rachel Komisarz*	7:53.42; WR	China; Zhu Yingwen; Xu Yanwei; Yang Yu; Pang Jiaying; Li Ji*	7:55.97; AS	Germany; Franziska van Almsick; Petra Dallmann; Antje Buschschulte; Hannah Stockbauer; Janina Götz*; Sara Harstick*	7:57.37
4 × 100 m medley relay	Australia; Giaan Rooney (1:01.18) OC; Leisel Jones (1:06.50); Petria Thomas (56.67); Jodie Henry (52.97); Brooke Hanson*; Alice Mills*; Jessicah Schipper*	3:57.32; WR	United States; Natalie Coughlin (59.68) OR; Amanda Beard (1:06.32); Jenny Thompson (58.81); Kara Lynn Joyce (54.31); Haley Cope*; Tara Kirk*; Rachel Komisarz*; Amanda Weir*	3:59.12	Germany; Antje Buschschulte (1:00.72); Sarah Poewe (1:07.08); Franziska van Almsick (58.54); Daniela Götz (54.38)	4:00.72; ER

* Swimmers who participated in the heats only and received medals.

== Records ==
The following world and Olympic records were established during the competition:

=== World records ===
Date	Round	Event	Established for	Time	Name	Nation
14 August	Final	Men's 400 metre individual medley	(same)	4:08.26	Michael Phelps	United States
14 August	Final	Women's 4 × 100 metre freestyle relay	(same)	3:35.94	Alice Mills (54.75); Libby Lenton (53.57); Petria Thomas (54.67); Jodie Henry (52.95)	Australia
15 August	Final	Men's 4 × 100 metre freestyle relay	(same)	3:13.17	Roland Schoeman (48.17); Lyndon Ferns (48.13); Darian Townsend (48.96); Ryk Neethling (47.91)	South Africa
18 August	Semifinal 2	Women's 100 metre freestyle	(same)	53.52	Jodie Henry	Australia
18 August	Final	Women's 4 × 200 metre freestyle relay	(same)	7:53.42	Natalie Coughlin (1:57.74); Carly Piper (1:59.39); Dana Vollmer (1:58.12); Kaitlin Sandeno (1:58.17)	United States
21 August	Final	Women's 4 × 100 metre medley relay	(same)	3:57.32	Giaan Rooney (1:01.18); Leisel Jones (1:06.70); Petria Thomas (56.67); Jodie Henry (52.97)	Australia
21 August	Final	Men's 4 × 100 metre medley relay	Men's 100 metre backstroke	53.45	Aaron Peirsol	United States
21 August	Final	Men's 4 × 100 metre medley relay	(same)	3:30.68	Aaron Peirsol (53.45); Brendan Hansen (59.37); Ian Crocker (50.28); Jason Lezak (47.58)	United States

=== Olympic records ===
Date	Round	Event	Established for	Time	Name	Nation
14 August	Heat 7	Men's 100 metre breaststroke	(same)	1:00.03	Kosuke Kitajima	Japan
14 August	Semifinal 1	Men's 100 metre breaststroke	(same)	1:00.01	Brendan Hansen	United States
15 August	Semifinal 2	Women's 100 metre backstroke	(same)	1:00.17	Natalie Coughlin	United States
15 August	Semifinal 1	Women's 100 metre breaststroke	(same)	1:06.78	Leisel Jones	Australia
16 August	Final	Men's 200 metre freestyle	(same)	1:44.71	Ian Thorpe	Australia
16 August	Final	Women's 100 metre breaststroke	(same)	1:06.64	Luo Xuejuan	China
17 August	Final	Men's 200 metre butterfly	(same)	1:54.04	Michael Phelps	United States
18 August	Final	Men's 200 metre breaststroke	(same)	2:09.44	Kosuke Kitajima	Japan
18 August	Semifinal 2	Men's 200 metre backstroke	(same)	1:55.14	Aaron Peirsol	United States
18 August	Semifinal 1	Men's 200 metre individual medley	(same)	1:58.52	Michael Phelps	United States
19 August	Final	Women's 200 metre breaststroke	(same)	2:23.57	Amanda Beard	United States
19 August	Final	Men's 200 metre backstroke	(same)	1:54.95	Aaron Peirsol	United States
19 August	Final	Men's 200 metre individual medley	(same)	1:57.14	Michael Phelps	United States
19 August	Semifinal 1	Men's 100 metre butterfly	(same)	51.74	Andriy Serdinov	Ukraine
19 August	Semifinal 2	Men's 100 metre butterfly	(same)	51.61	Michael Phelps	United States
20 August	Final	Men's 100 metre butterfly	(same)	51.25	Michael Phelps	United States
21 August	Final	Men's 1500 metre freestyle	(same)	14:43.40	Grant Hackett	Australia
21 August	Final	Women's 4 × 100 metre medley relay	Women's 100 metre backstroke	59.68	Natalie Coughlin	United States
