= 1999 Pan Pacific Swimming Championships – Women's 100 metre butterfly =

Women's 100 metre butterfly at the 1999 Pan Pacific Swimming Championships
- Venue: Sydney International Aquatic Centre
- Dates: August 22, 1999 (heats & semifinals); August 23, 1999 (final)
- Competitors: 28 from 8 nations
- Winning time: 57.88

Medalists
gold medal	Jenny Thompson	United States
silver medal	Susie O'Neill	Australia
bronze medal	Ayari Aoyama	Japan

The women's 100 metre butterfly competition at the 1999 Pan Pacific Swimming Championships took place on August 22–23 at the Sydney International Aquatic Centre. The last champion was Jenny Thompson of US.

This race consisted of two lengths of the pool, all in butterfly.

== Records ==
Prior to this competition, the existing world and Pan Pacific records were as follows:

World record	Mary T. Meagher (USA)	57.93	Brown Deer, United States	August 16, 1981
Pan Pacific Championships record	Jenny Thompson (USA)	59.00	Fukuoka, Japan	August 12, 1997

== Results ==
All times are in minutes and seconds.

KEY:	q	Fastest non-qualifiers	Q	Qualified	CR	Championships record	NR	National record	PB	Personal best	SB	Seasonal best

=== Heats ===
The first round was held on August 22.

Rank	Name	Nationality	Time	Notes
1	Jenny Thompson	United States	59.26	Q
2	Susie O'Neill	Australia	59.43	Q
3	Misty Hyman	United States	59.89	Q
4	Ayari Aoyama	Japan	1:00.35	Q
5	Ashley Tappin	United States	1:00.76	Q
6	Maki Mita	Japan	1:00.84	Q
7	Richelle DePold-Fox	United States	1:00.85	Q
8	Tomoko Hagiwara	Japan	1:01.04	Q
9	Karine Chevrier	Canada	1:01.13	Q
10	Junko Onishi	Japan	1:01.34	Q
11	Jessica Deglau	Canada	1:01.47	Q
12	Jennifer Button	Canada	1:01.83	Q
13	Molly Freedman	United States	1:01.85	
14	Renate du Plessis	South Africa	1:02.05	Q
15	Pang Ran	China	1:02.20	Q
16	Andrea Schwartz	Canada	1:02.26	Q
17	Amanda Loots	South Africa	1:02.55	Q
18	Kate Godfrey	Australia	1:02.59	
19	Sarah Evanetz	Canada	1:02.66	
20	Kelly Stefanyshyn	Canada	1:02.84	
21	Angela Kennedy	Australia	1:02.87	
22	Megan McMahon	Australia	1:03.00	
23	Cho Hee-Yeon	South Korea	1:03.09	
24	Kirsten van Heerden	South Africa	1:03.91	
25	Candice Crafford	South Africa	1:04.64	
26	Candice Nethercott	South Africa	1:04.74	
27	Kuan Chia-hsien	Chinese Taipei	1:07.29	
28	Sung Yi-chieh	Chinese Taipei	1:07.31	

=== Semifinals ===
The semifinals were held on August 22.

Rank	Name	Nationality	Time	Notes
1	Jenny Thompson	United States	58.57	Q, CR
2	Susie O'Neill	Australia	59.44	Q
3	Ayari Aoyama	Japan	1:00.13	Q
4	Misty Hyman	United States	1:00.16	Q
5	Richelle DePold-Fox	United States	1:00.17	
6	Jessica Deglau	Canada	1:00.48	Q
7	Tomoko Hagiwara	Japan	1:00.51	Q
8	Maki Mita	Japan	1:00.54	
9	Ashley Tappin	United States	1:00.65	
10	Karine Chevrier	Canada	1:00.91	Q
11	Junko Onishi	Japan	1:01.22	
12	Jennifer Button	Canada	1:01.44	
13	Amanda Loots	South Africa	1:01.71	Q
14	Renate du Plessis	South Africa	1:01.89	
15	Pang Ran	China	1:01.92	
16	Andrea Schwartz	Canada	1:02.59	

=== Final ===
The final was held on August 23.

Rank	Lane	Nationality	Time	Notes
1st place, gold medalist(s)	Jenny Thompson	United States	57.88	WR
2nd place, silver medalist(s)	Susie O'Neill	Australia	59.07	
3rd place, bronze medalist(s)	Ayari Aoyama	Japan	59.58	
4	Misty Hyman	United States	1:00.39	
5	Tomoko Hagiwara	Japan	1:00.63	
6	Jessica Deglau	Canada	1:00.72	
7	Amanda Loots	South Africa	1:01.54	
8	Karine Chevrier	Canada	1:01.57	
