= 2002 Pan Pacific Swimming Championships – Women's 200 metre freestyle =

Women's 200 metre freestyle at the 2002 Pan Pacific Swimming Championships
- Venue: Yokohama International Swimming Pool
- Dates: August 26, 2002 (heats & semifinals); August 27, 2002 (final)
- Competitors: 28 from 8 nations
- Winning time: 1:58.74

Medalists
gold medal	Lindsay Benko	United States
silver medal	Elka Graham	Australia
bronze medal	Giaan Rooney	Australia

The women's 200 metre freestyle competition at the 2002 Pan Pacific Swimming Championships took place on August 26–27 at the Yokohama International Swimming Pool. The last champion was Susie O'Neill of Australia.

This race consisted of four lengths of the pool, all in freestyle.

== Records ==
Prior to this competition, the existing world and Pan Pacific records were as follows:

World record	Franziska van Almsick (GER)	1:56.64	Berlin, Germany	August 3, 2002
Pan Pacific Championships record	Claudia Poll (CRC)	1:57.48	Fukuoka, Japan	August 10, 1997

== Results ==
All times are in minutes and seconds.

KEY:	q	Fastest non-qualifiers	Q	Qualified	CR	Championships record	NR	National record	PB	Personal best	SB	Seasonal best

=== Heats ===
The first round was held on August 26.

Rank	Heat	Lane	Name	Nationality	Time	Notes
1	4	4	Lindsay Benko	United States	2:00.72	Q
2	4	5	Tomoko Hagiwara	Japan	2:00.75	Q
3	2	4	Elka Graham	Australia	2:01.04	Q
4	4	3	Diana Munz	United States	2:01.11	Q
5	2	2	Alison Fitch	New Zealand	2:01.35	Q
6	1	5	Mariana Brochado	Brazil	2:01.45	Q
7	3	5	Giaan Rooney	Australia	2:01.60	Q
8	4	8	Monique Ferreira	Brazil	2:01.70	Q
9	3	4	Pang Jiaying	China	2:01.84	Q
10	3	3	Tomoko Nagai	Japan	2:02.09	Q
10	3	6	Norie Urabe	Japan	2:02.09	Q
12	2	3	Jessica Deglau	Canada	2:02.37	Q
13	3	2	Mary Hill	United States	2:02.42	Q
14	4	7	Heidi Crawford	Australia	2:02.46	Q
15	2	6	Sachiko Yamada	Japan	2:02.60	Q
16	3	1	Elizabeth Collins	Canada	2:02.63	Q
17	4	6	Rhiannon Jeffrey	United States	2:02.71	
18	2	8	Ai Shibata	Japan	2:03.34	
19	4	2	Rebecca Creedy	Australia	2:03.63	
20	1	3	Denise Oliveira	Brazil	2:04.78	
21	2	1	Kelly Doody	Canada	2:04.99	
22	3	7	Helen Norfolk	New Zealand	2:05.19	
23	2	7	Madoka Ochi	Japan	2:05.73	
24	3	8	Sarah Jackson	New Zealand	2:06.08	
25	1	6	Melanie Bouchard	Canada	2:06.51	
26	1	4	Rebecca Linton	New Zealand	2:07.32	
27	1	2	Melissa Ingram	New Zealand	2:09.56	
28	1	1	Wei Min Teo	Singapore	2:12.14	
-	1	7	Nathalie Bernard	New Zealand	DNS	
-	2	5	Petria Thomas	Australia	DNS	
-	4	1	Laura Nicholls	Canada	DNS	

=== Semifinals ===
The semifinals were held on August 26.

Rank	Heat	Lane	Name	Nationality	Time	Notes
1	2	4	Lindsay Benko	United States	2:00.66	Q
2	1	5	Diana Munz	United States	2:00.78	Q
3	2	5	Elka Graham	Australia	2:00.85	Q
4	1	4	Tomoko Hagiwara	Japan	2:01.37	Q
4	2	6	Giaan Rooney	Australia	2:01.37	Q
6	1	3	Mariana Brochado	Brazil	2:01.52	Q
7	2	8	Sachiko Yamada	Japan	2:01.55	Q
8	2	2	Pang Jiaying	China	2:01.61	Q
9	2	1	Mary Hill	United States	2:01.73	
10	2	3	Alison Fitch	New Zealand	2:01.92	
11	1	2	Tomoko Nagai	Japan	2:02.04	
12	1	6	Monique Ferreira	Brazil	2:02.20	
13	1	8	Elizabeth Collins	Canada	2:02.54	
14	1	1	Heidi Crawford	Australia	2:02.58	
15	2	7	Norie Urabe	Japan	2:03.27	
16	1	7	Jessica Deglau	Canada	2:03.53	

=== Final ===
The final was held on August 27.

Rank	Lane	Name	Nationality	Time	Notes
1st place, gold medalist(s)	4	Lindsay Benko	United States	1:58.74	
2nd place, silver medalist(s)	3	Elka Graham	Australia	1:59.72	
3rd place, bronze medalist(s)	2	Giaan Rooney	Australia	1:59.82	
4	6	Tomoko Hagiwara	Japan	2:00.26	
5	5	Diana Munz	United States	2:00.95	
6	8	Pang Jiaying	China	2:01.65	
7	1	Sachiko Yamada	Japan	2:01.94	
8	7	Mariana Brochado	Brazil	2:02.68	
