= 1999 Pan Pacific Swimming Championships – Women's 200 metre butterfly =

Sydney swimming competition

Women's 200 metre butterfly at the 1999 Pan Pacific Swimming Championships
- Venue: Sydney International Aquatic Centre
- Dates: August 25, 1999 (heats & semifinals); August 26, 1999 (final)
- Competitors: 21 from 7 nations
- Winning time: 2:06.60

Medalists
gold medal	Susie O'Neill	Australia
silver medal	Jessica Deglau	Canada
bronze medal	Misty Hyman	United States

The women's 200 metre butterfly competition at the 1999 Pan Pacific Swimming Championships took place on August 25–26 at the Sydney International Aquatic Centre. The last champion was Susie O'Neill of Australia.

This race consisted of four lengths of the pool, all lengths being in butterfly stroke.

== Records ==
Prior to this competition, the existing world and Pan Pacific records were as follows:

World record	Mary T. Meagher (USA)	2:05.96	Brown Deer, United States	August 13, 1981
Pan Pacific Championships record	Susie O'Neill (AUS)	2:07.29	Atlanta, United States	August 10, 1995

== Results ==
All times are in minutes and seconds.

KEY:	q	Fastest non-qualifiers	Q	Qualified	CR	Championships record	NR	National record	PB	Personal best	SB	Seasonal best

=== Heats ===
The first round was held on August 25.

Rank	Name	Nationality	Time	Notes
1	Susie O'Neill	Australia	2:07.73	Q
2	Misty Hyman	United States	2:09.79	Q
3	Jessica Deglau	Canada	2:10.97	Q
4	Molly Freedman	United States	2:11.22	
5	Maki Mita	Japan	2:12.60	Q
6	Ayari Aoyama	Japan	2:13.48	Q
7	Jennifer Button	Canada	2:13.99	Q
8	Amanda Loots	South Africa	2:14.58	Q
9	Yasuko Tajima	Japan	2:14.63	Q
10	Madeleine Crippen	United States	2:15.01	Q
11	Brooke Bennett	United States	2:15.15	Q
12	Andrea Schwartz	Canada	2:15.36	Q
13	Karine Chevrier	Canada	2:15.41	Q
14	Cho Hee-Yeon	South Korea	2:15.47	Q
15	Elizabeth Van Welie	New Zealand	2:15.94	Q
16	Renate du Plessis	South Africa	2:16.10	Q
17	Junko Onishi	Japan	2:17.26	Q
18	Kate Godfrey	Australia	2:17.26	
19	Sarah Evanetz	Canada	2:19.48	
20	Natalie du Toit	South Africa	2:21.90	
21	Carissa Thompson	New Zealand	2:24.95	

=== Semifinals ===
The semifinals were held on August 25.

Rank	Name	Nationality	Time	Notes
1	Susie O'Neill	Australia	2:06.53	Q, CR, CWR
2	Jessica Deglau	Canada	2:10.45	Q
3	Misty Hyman	United States	2:10.82	Q
4	Maki Mita	Japan	2:11.36	Q
5	Madeleine Crippen	United States	2:11.63	Q
6	Ayari Aoyama	Japan	2:11.81	Q
7	Amanda Loots	South Africa	2:13.42	Q
8	Yasuko Tajima	Japan	2:13.45	
9	Andrea Schwartz	Canada	2:13.83	Q
10	Junko Onishi	Japan	2:14.38	
11	Jennifer Button	Canada	2:14.69	
12	Brooke Bennett	United States	2:15.45	
13	Elizabeth Van Welie	New Zealand	2:15.76	
14	Cho Hee-Yeon	South Korea	2:16.34	
15	Renate du Plessis	South Africa	2:16.47	
16	Karine Chevrier	Canada	2:17.09	

=== Final ===
The final was held on August 26.

Rank	Lane	Nationality	Time	Notes
1st place, gold medalist(s)	Susie O'Neill	Australia	2:06.60	
2nd place, silver medalist(s)	Jessica Deglau	Canada	2:10.27	
3rd place, bronze medalist(s)	Misty Hyman	United States	2:10.40	
4	Ayari Aoyama	Japan	2:11.27	
5	Molly Freedman	United States	2:11.73	
6	Maki Mita	Japan	2:12.31	
7	Amanda Loots	South Africa	2:12.87	
8	Andrea Schwartz	Canada	2:14.45	
