= 2026 Pan Pacific Swimming Championships – Women's 200 metre freestyle =

Women's 200 metre freestyle at the 2026 Pan Pacific Swimming Championships
- Venue: William Woollett Jr. Aquatics Center
- Dates: August 12
- Competitors: 39 from 10 nations
- Winning time: 1:53.67 CR

Medalists
| gold medal | Lani Pallister | Australia |
| silver medal | Summer McIntosh | Canada |
| bronze medal | Erika Fairweather | New Zealand |

Official Video (heats)

Official Video (B and A final)

The women's 200 metre freestyle event at the 2026 Pan Pacific Swimming Championships was held on August 12 at the William Woollett Jr. Aquatics Center in Irvine, California. It was the third of 41 events on the four-day pool swimming program, and the fourteenth time the women's 200 metre freestyle had been contested at the championships, having featured at every previous edition since 1985. A total of 39 swimmers from 10 nations entered the competition. The event was won by Australia's Lani Pallister in a championship record time of 1:53.67. She finished ahead of Canada's Summer McIntosh, who claimed silver in 1:53.86, and New Zealand's Erika Fairweather, who won bronze in a national record time of 1:55.05.

== Competition format and event history ==
The Pan Pacific Swimming Championships is an international long course swimming competition first held in 1985. It was established as an alternative to the European Championships and is open to nations that are not members of European Aquatics. (Note: At a meeting of the four charter nations of the Pan Pacific Swimming Association (the United States, Australia, Canada and Japan) on August 23, 2024, it was agreed that the 10 kilometre open water events at the 2026 championships would be open to all members of European Aquatics wishing to participate, with a maximum of two entries per nation in each event.) The 2026 championships featured 41 swimming events in the pool across four days, from August 12 to 15, preceded by the men's and women's 10 km open water swimming events on August 10. The women's 200 metre freestyle was the fifth event overall and the third on the pool swimming program, following the women's and men's 50 metre butterfly events.

The event consisted of preliminary heats followed by an A final and a B final, with no semifinals contested. Both the heats and finals were held on August 12, the opening day of pool competition. Under the championship regulations, each nation could enter an unlimited number of swimmers in the preliminary heats. However, only the two fastest eligible swimmers from each nation could advance to the A final, following any withdrawals. Each nation could also qualify up to two additional swimmers for the B final, regardless of whether it had one or two representatives in the A final. Consequently, a maximum of four swimmers per nation could compete across both finals. The eight A finalists contested the medals and championship points, while the B final determined the remaining eligible finishing positions.

The women's 200 metre freestyle was one of 32 events contested at every edition of the Pan Pacific Swimming Championships, making its 2026 appearance the fourteenth in championship history. American Carrie Steinseifer won the inaugural title at the 1985 championships in Tokyo in 2:01.52, followed by compatriot Mitzi Kremer in 1987 in 2:01.34 and Canada's Patricia Noall in 1989 in 2:00.87. American Nicole Haislett won the event at the 1991 championships in 2:00.31, before Costa Rica's Claudia Poll claimed the first of her two titles in 1993, setting a championship record of 1:58.85. Japan's Suzu Chiba won the 1995 title in exactly two minutes, before Poll regained the championship in 1997, lowering her own record to 1:57.48. Her performance remained the championship record for 13 years. Australia's Susie O'Neill won the event at the 1999 championships in Sydney in an Australian and Commonwealth record time of 1:58.17.

American Lindsay Benko won in 2002 in 1:58.74, followed by compatriot Katie Hoff in 2006 in 1:58.02. At the 2010 championships in Irvine, American Allison Schmitt broke Poll's longstanding championship record in the preliminary heats, recording 1:56.23. She subsequently won the gold medal in the final, lowering the mark to 1:56.10. Four years later, Katie Ledecky won the 2014 title on the Gold Coast in a championship record of 1:55.74, after compatriot Missy Franklin had briefly lowered the previous record to 1:56.04 in the B final.

At the 2018 championships in Tokyo, American Katie Ledecky qualified fastest for the final, breaking the championship record with a time of 1:55.16 in the preliminary heats. In the final, Canada's Taylor Ruck won the gold medal in a championship, Commonwealth and Canadian record of 1:54.44, lowering Ledecky's record by 0.72 seconds. Japan's Rikako Ikee took silver in a Japanese and Asian record of 1:54.85, while Ledecky won bronze in 1:55.15. The 2022 championships were cancelled due to the COVID-19 pandemic. All three medalists from 2018 returned for the 2026 championships but did not compete in the women's 200 metre freestyle. (Note: Ruck competed in the 50 and 100 metre freestyle, the 50 and 100 metre butterfly and the 100 metre backstroke events. Ikee also competed in the 50 and 100 metre butterfly and 50 metre freestyle events while Ledecky won silver in the 400 and 800 metre freestyle and won gold in the 1500 metre freestyle.)

== Race summary ==
A total of 39 swimmers from 10 nations contested the event. American Torri Huske withdrew from the event to focus on the women's 50 metre butterfly, which was also contested on the opening day. Huske subsequently missed the A final of the 50 metre butterfly under the two-swimmers-per-nation restriction, but finished second in the B final. Canadian Julie Brousseau was also included in the preliminary entry list but withdrew from the meet due to illness. Australia's Lani Pallister recorded the fastest qualifying time of 1:55.29 in the fifth and final heat, followed by New Zealand's Erika Fairweather in 1:55.53 and American Anna Peplowski in 1:55.77. Canada's Summer McIntosh qualified fourth overall in 1:55.85, narrowly ahead of American Erin Gemmell, who recorded 1:55.88. Another American, Rylee Erisman, finished sixth overall in 1:56.00 but was assigned to the B final under the two-swimmers-per-nation restriction. Australia's Milla Jansen qualified for the A final with the seventh-fastest time of 1:56.22, while American Simone Manuel, eighth overall in 1:56.34, was assigned to the B final. Brazil's Maria Fernanda Costa and Stephanie Balduccini qualified for the A final despite recording the tenth- and twelfth-fastest times, respectively. Australia's Inez Miller qualified for the B final in eleventh place overall in 1:57.09. American Kennedi Dobson, who finished thirteenth overall in 1:57.26, did not qualify for either final, having been the fifth-fastest American in the heats. Australia's Jenna Forrester, who finished fifteenth overall in 1:57.92, also missed out on both finals as the fifth-fastest Australian. Further down the standings, Mexico's Ava Chavez established a national record of 1:59.58, finishing 24th overall and second reserve.

In the evening session, Australia's Inez Miller won the B final in a personal best time of 1:55.60, improving on her previous best of 1:56.41 set at the Australian Trials by 0.81 seconds. Erisman finished second in 1:55.96, followed by Manuel in 1:56.14. Miller's winning time was faster than the performances of the fourth- through eighth-place finishers in the A final, although she had been the fourth-fastest Australian in the preliminary heats. Miller was sixth after the opening 50 metres, fourth at halfway and third with one length remaining, before taking the lead over the final length. Her closing split of 28.76 seconds was faster than that of any swimmer in the A final.

Pallister entered the A final as the fastest qualifier, having won silver in the same event at the 2026 Commonwealth Games in Glasgow behind compatriot Mollie O'Callaghan. O'Callaghan, the reigning Olympic and world champion, did not compete at the Pan Pacific Championships after withdrawing because of a back injury. In the final, Pallister led after the opening 50 metres in 26.71 seconds, before McIntosh moved ahead at the halfway mark, turning in 55.38 to Pallister's 55.50. Pallister regained the lead over the third length and entered the final 50 metres in 1:24.84, just 0.09 seconds ahead of McIntosh. Pallister extended her lead over the final 50 metres, covering the closing length in 28.83 seconds compared with McIntosh's 28.93. She won the gold medal in a championship record time of 1:53.67, improving on Taylor Ruck's previous mark of 1:54.44 established at the 2018 championships. Pallister's winning time was just 0.02 seconds outside her personal best of 1:53.65 set at the Australian Trials and represented an improvement of 1.34 seconds on her performance at the Commonwealth Games. Pallister became only the second Australian swimmer to win the women's 200 metre freestyle at the Pan Pacific Swimming Championships, and the first since Susie O'Neill won the event at the 1999 championships in Sydney, 27 years earlier.

McIntosh claimed the silver medal in 1:53.86, finishing 0.19 seconds behind Pallister and 0.21 seconds outside her personal best of 1:53.65, which she had recorded at the 2023 World Aquatics Championships in Fukuoka, where it established a world junior record in the event. The 2026 race was McIntosh's first international appearance in the 200 metre freestyle since the 2023 World Championships. Following the race, she expressed disappointment with her performance, saying that she had overthought her race rather than simply concentrating on racing. McIntosh had elected to contest the 200 metre freestyle rather than the 200 metre butterfly, an event in which she set the world record at the Canadian Trials in June. New Zealand's Fairweather secured the bronze medal in a national record time of 1:55.05, improving on her own previous mark. She had also won bronze in the event at the 2026 Commonwealth Games. Peplowski finished fourth in 1:55.94, followed by Jansen in fifth with 1:56.64 and Gemmell in sixth with 1:56.88. Brazil's Costa and Balduccini completed the A final in seventh and eighth, recording 1:57.25 and 1:58.41, respectively.

Later that evening, Pallister returned to the pool for the women's 1500 metre freestyle, finishing second behind American Katie Ledecky in an Australian, Oceanian and Commonwealth record of 15:38.62, a personal best that made her the third-fastest performer in history. Pallister had deliberately embraced the challenge of contesting both events, describing the opportunity as a chance to become a better athlete. She said she was proud of completing the double, having selected the demanding schedule as part of her preparation for the 2028 Olympic Games in Los Angeles.

== Records ==
Prior to this competition, the existing records were as follows:

Records before the 2026 Pan Pacific Swimming Championships
| Record | Time (s) | Athlete (nation) | Meet | Location | Date | Ref |
|---|---|---|---|---|---|---|
| World record | 1:52.23 | Ariarne Titmus (AUS) | Australian Trials | Brisbane, Australia | June 12, 2024 | |
| Championship record | 1:54.44 | Taylor Ruck (CAN) | 2018 Pan Pacs | Tokyo, Japan | August 9, 2018 | |

== Schedule ==
The schedule was as follows:

All times are Pacific Daylight Time (UTC−7)

Schedule
| Date | Time | Round |
|---|---|---|
| Wednesday, August 12, 2026 | 10:15 | Heats |
| Wednesday, August 12, 2026 | 19:25 | Finals |

== Results ==
=== Heats ===
The heats were held at 10:15 on August 12, 2026.

Key: QA = Qualified for A final; QB = Qualified for B final; R = Reserve; CR = Championship record; NR = National record.

Heat results
| Rank | Heat | Lane | Swimmer | Nation | Time | Notes |
|---|---|---|---|---|---|---|
| 1 | 5 | 4 | Lani Pallister | Australia | 1:55.29 | QA |
| 2 | 3 | 4 | Erika Fairweather | New Zealand | 1:55.53 | QA |
| 3 | 4 | 5 | Anna Peplowski | United States | 1:55.77 | QA |
| 4 | 4 | 4 | Summer McIntosh | Canada | 1:55.85 | QA |
| 5 | 5 | 5 | Erin Gemmell | United States | 1:55.88 | QA |
| 6 | 3 | 3 | Rylee Erisman | United States | 1:56.00 | QB |
| 7 | 5 | 2 | Milla Jansen | Australia | 1:56.22 | QA |
| 8 | 5 | 3 | Simone Manuel | United States | 1:56.34 | QB |
| 9 | 4 | 3 | Hannah Casey | Australia | 1:56.74 | QB |
| 10 | 3 | 5 | Maria Fernanda Costa | Brazil | 1:57.01 | QA |
| 11 | 4 | 6 | Inez Miller | Australia | 1:57.09 | QB |
| 12 | 3 | 6 | Stephanie Balduccini | Brazil | 1:57.16 | QA |
| 13 | 5 | 7 | Kennedi Dobson | United States | 1:57.26 | |
| 14 | 4 | 2 | Fan Yaqi | China | 1:57.35 | QB |
| 15 | 3 | 2 | Jenna Forrester | Australia | 1:57.92 | |
| 16 | 5 | 1 | Alex Walsh | United States | 1:58.20 | |
| 17 | 5 | 6 | Yang Peiqi | China | 1:58.23 | QB |
| 18 | 4 | 1 | Emma O'Croinin | Canada | 1:58.24 | QB |
| 19 | 2 | 6 | Brooklyn Douthwright | Canada | 1:58.49 | QB |
| 20 | 4 | 8 | Sienna Angove | Canada | 1:58.75 | |
| 21 | 3 | 1 | Leah Hayes | United States | 1:58.92 | |
| 22 | 5 | 8 | Summer Cardwell | Canada | 1:59.07 | |
| 23 | 2 | 1 | Rio Suzuki | Japan | 1:59.57 | R |
| 24 | 1 | 3 | Ava Chavez | Mexico | 1:59.58 | R, NR |
| 25 | 4 | 7 | Amelia Weber | Australia | 1:59.62 | |
| 26 | 2 | 2 | Yui Fukuoka | Japan | 1:59.66 | |
| 27 | 1 | 5 | Eve Thomas | New Zealand | 1:59.78 | |
| 28 | 3 | 7 | Nagisa Ikemoto | Japan | 1:59.83 | |
| 29 | 2 | 7 | Jacqueline Davison-McGovern | Australia | 1:59.88 | |
| 30 | 3 | 8 | Waka Kobori | Japan | 1:59.93 | |
| 31 | 2 | 4 | Miyu Namba | Japan | 2:00.05 | |
| 32 | 1 | 4 | Ella Cosgrove | Canada | 2:00.42 | |
| 33 | 2 | 3 | Leah Tigert | Canada | 2:00.51 | |
| 34 | 1 | 6 | Mio Narita | Japan | 2:00.98 | |
| 35 | 2 | 8 | Aline Rodrigues | Brazil | 2:01.18 | |
| 36 | 2 | 5 | Ruka Takezawa | Japan | 2:01.38 | |
| 37 | 1 | 2 | Alyssa Tapper | New Zealand | 2:02.34 | |
| 38 | 1 | 7 | Corne van Schalkwyk | South Africa | 2:03.21 | |
| 39 | 1 | 1 | Chloe Kennedy Anne Isleta | Philippines | 2:05.19 | |

=== B final ===
The B final was held at 19:25 on August 12, 2026.

B final results
| Rank | Lane | Swimmer | Nation | Time | Notes |
|---|---|---|---|---|---|
| 9 | 6 | Inez Miller | Australia | 1:55.60 | |
| 10 | 4 | Rylee Erisman | United States | 1:55.96 | |
| 11 | 5 | Simone Manuel | United States | 1:56.14 | |
| 12 | 2 | Fan Yaqi | China | 1:56.92 | |
| 13 | 3 | Hannah Casey | Australia | 1:58.22 | |
| 14 | 7 | Yang Peiqi | China | 1:58.32 | |
| 15 | 8 | Brooklyn Douthwright | Canada | 1:58.86 | |
| 16 | 1 | Emma O'Croinin | Canada | 1:58.93 | |

=== A final ===
The A final was held after the B final on August 12, 2026.

A final results
| Rank | Lane | Swimmer | Nation | Time | Points (Note: A team trophy was awarded to the nation scoring the most points. In individual events, points were awarded on a 9–7–6–5–4–3–2–1 basis for first through eighth place in the A final. In relay events, points were awarded on an 18–14–12–10–8–6–4–2 basis for the first- through eighth-place teams in the A final. The United States won the team title with 540.5 points, ahead of Australia (409), Japan (228) and Canada (220).) | Notes |
|---|---|---|---|---|---|---|
| 1st place, gold medalist(s) | 4 | Lani Pallister | Australia | 1:53.67 | 9 | CR |
| 2nd place, silver medalist(s) | 6 | Summer McIntosh | Canada | 1:53.86 | 7 | |
| 3rd place, bronze medalist(s) | 5 | Erika Fairweather | New Zealand | 1:55.05 | 6 | NR |
| 4 | 3 | Anna Peplowski | United States | 1:55.94 | 5 | |
| 5 | 7 | Milla Jansen | Australia | 1:56.64 | 4 | |
| 6 | 2 | Erin Gemmell | United States | 1:56.88 | 3 | |
| 7 | 1 | Maria Fernanda Costa | Brazil | 1:57.25 | 2 | |
| 8 | 8 | Stephanie Balduccini | Brazil | 1:58.41 | 1 | |
