= 1999 Pan Pacific Swimming Championships – Women's 200 metre freestyle =

Women's 200 metre freestyle at the 1999 Pan Pacific Swimming Championships
- Venue: Sydney International Aquatic Centre
- Dates: August 24, 1999 (heats & semifinals); August 25, 1999 (final)
- Competitors: 45 from 9 nations
- Winning time: 1:58.17

Medalists
gold medal	Susie O'Neill	Australia
silver medal	Lindsay Benko	United States
bronze medal	Ellen Stonebraker	United States

The women's 200 metre freestyle competition at the 1999 Pan Pacific Swimming Championships took place on August 24–25 at the Sydney International Aquatic Centre. The last champion was Claudia Poll of Costa Rica.

This race consisted of four lengths of the pool, all in freestyle.

== Records ==
Prior to this competition, the existing world and Pan Pacific records were as follows:

World record	Franziska van Almsick (GER)	1:56.78	Rome, Italy	September 6, 1994
Pan Pacific Championships record	Claudia Poll (CRC)	1:57.48	Fukuoka, Japan	August 10, 1997

== Results ==
All times are in minutes and seconds.

KEY:	q	Fastest non-qualifiers	Q	Qualified	CR	Championships record	NR	National record	PB	Personal best	SB	Seasonal best

=== Heats ===
The first round was held on August 24.

Rank	Name	Nationality	Time	Notes
1	Susie O'Neill	Australia	1:59.47	Q
2	Lindsay Benko	United States	1:59.81	Q
3	Claudia Poll	Costa Rica	2:00.30	Q
4	Cristina Teucher	United States	2:00.43	
5	Ellen Stonebraker	United States	2:00.48	Q
6	Jenny Thompson	United States	2:00.71	
7	Suzu Chiba	Japan	2:00.75	Q
8	Rebecca Creedy	Australia	2:01.34	Q
9	Samantha Arsenault	United States	2:01.56	Q
10	Sarah Tolar	United States	2:01.57	Q
11	Lori Munz	Australia	2:01.90	
12	Kari Haag-Woodall	United States	2:02.07	
12	Giaan Rooney	Australia	2:02.07	Q
14	Jacinta van Lint	Australia	2:02.48	Q
15	Elli Overton	Australia	2:02.55	
16	Junko Nakatani	Japan	2:03.14	Q
16	Emma Johnson	Australia	2:03.14	
18	Laura Nicholls	Canada	2:03.48	Q
19	Sarah D'Arcy	Australia	2:03.76	
20	Liesl Kolbisen	United States	2:04.09	
21	Maki Mita	Japan	2:04.21	Q
22	Kate Godfrey	Australia	2:04.36	
23	Roh Joo-hee	South Korea	2:04.46	Q
24	Jen Button	Canada	2:04.48	Q
25	Deanna Schonwald	New Zealand	2:04.84	
26	Melanie Dodd	Australia	2:05.08	
27	Charlene Benzie	Australia	2:05.14	
28	Tsai Shu-min	Chinese Taipei	2:05.33	
29	Andrea Schwartz	Canada	2:05.55	
30	Sachiko Yamada	Japan	2:05.67	
31	Katie Brambley	Canada	2:05.87	
32	Kim van Selm	South Africa	2:06.04	
33	Melissa Deary	United States	2:06.05	
34	Lindsay Beavers	Canada	2:06.23	
35	Danielle Woods	Australia	2:06.52	
36	Kirsten van Heerden	South Africa	2:06.78	
37	Alison Fitch	New Zealand	2:06.82	
38	Stacey Bowley	South Africa	2:07.10	
39	Monique Robins	New Zealand	2:07.15	
40	Jenna Gresdal	Canada	2:07.40	
41	Danielle Bell	Canada	2:07.65	
42	Chiang Tzu-ying	Chinese Taipei	2:08.37	
43	Sung Yi-chieh	Chinese Taipei	2:09.45	
44	Kuan Chia-hsien	Chinese Taipei	2:09.55	
45	Jolie Workman	New Zealand	2:10.67	

=== Semifinals ===
The semifinals were held on August 24.

Rank	Name	Nationality	Time	Notes
1	Susie O'Neill	Australia	1:59.88	Q
2	Lindsay Benko	United States	2:00.31	Q
3	Ellen Stonebraker	United States	2:00.52	Q
4	Suzu Chiba	Japan	2:00.53	Q
5	Claudia Poll	Costa Rica	2:00.76	Q
6	Giaan Rooney	Australia	2:01.02	Q
7	Sarah Tolar	United States	2:01.14	
8	Rebecca Creedy	Australia	2:01.21	
9	Samantha Arsenault	United States	2:01.33	
10	Jacinta van Lint	Australia	2:01.96	
11	Jen Button	Canada	2:02.48	
12	Junko Nakatani	Japan	2:03.14	Q
13	Laura Nicholls	Canada	2:02.93	Q
14	Maki Mita	Japan	2:03.35	
15	Deanna Schonwald	New Zealand	2:04.62	
16	Roh Joo-hee	South Korea	2:04.71	

=== Final ===
The final was held on August 25.

Rank	Lane	Nationality	Time	Notes
1st place, gold medalist(s)	Susie O'Neill	Australia	1:58.17	CWR
2nd place, silver medalist(s)	Lindsay Benko	United States	1:59.60	
3rd place, bronze medalist(s)	Ellen Stonebraker	United States	2:00.46	
4	Suzu Chiba	Japan	2:00.54	
5	Giaan Rooney	Australia	2:00.60	
6	Claudia Poll	Costa Rica	2:01.26	
7	Junko Nakatani	Japan	2:01.94	
8	Laura Nicholls	Canada	2:04.73	
