= 1999 Pan Pacific Swimming Championships – Women's 4 × 200 metre freestyle relay =

Women's 4 × 200 metre freestyle relay at the 1999 Pan Pacific Swimming Championships
- Venue: Sydney International Aquatic Centre
- Dates: August 26, 1999 (heats & finals)
- Winning time: 7:57.61

Medalists
gold medal	Lindsay Benko, Ellen Stonebraker, Jenny Thompson and Cristina Teuscher	United States
silver medal	Giaan Rooney, Rebecca Creedy, Lori Munz and Susie O'Neill	Australia
bronze medal	Jessica Deglau, Joanne Malar, Marianne Limpert and Laura Nicholls	Canada

The women's 4 × 200 metre freestyle relay competition at the 1999 Pan Pacific Swimming Championships took place on August 26 at the Sydney International Aquatic Centre. The last champion was the United States.

This race consisted of sixteen lengths of the pool. Each of the four swimmers completed four lengths of the pool. The first swimmer had to touch the wall before the second could leave the starting block.

== Records ==
Prior to this competition, the existing world and Pan Pacific records were as follows:

World record	East Germany (GDR); Manuela Stellmach (2:00.23); Astrid Strauss (1:58.90); Anke Möhring (1:58.73); Heike Friedrich (1:57.61)	7:55.47	Strasbourg, France	August 18, 1987
Pan Pacific Championships record	United States (USA); Cristina Teuscher (1:59.65); Melanie Valerio (2:01.71); Trina Jackson (2:00.51); Jenny Thompson (2:00.81)	8:02.68	Atlanta, United States	August 11, 1995

== Results ==
All times are in minutes and seconds.

KEY:	q	Fastest non-qualifiers	Q	Qualified	CR	Championships record	NR	National record	PB	Personal best	SB	Seasonal best

=== Heats ===
Heats weren't performed, as only six teams had entered.

=== Final ===
The final was held on August 22.

Rank	Name	Nationality	Time	Notes
1st place, gold medalist(s)	Lindsay Benko (1:58.86); Ellen Stonebraker (1:59.68); Jenny Thompson (2:00.02); Cristina Teuscher (1:59.05)	United States	7:57.61	CR
2nd place, silver medalist(s)	Giaan Rooney (2:00.62); Rebecca Creedy (2:01.32); Lori Munz (1:59.57); Susie O'Neill (1:59.16)	Australia	8:00.67	CWR
3rd place, bronze medalist(s)	Jessica Deglau (2:02.55); Joanne Malar (2:00.99); Marianne Limpert (2:02.02); Laura Nicholls (2:01.30)	Canada	8:06.86	
4	Junko Nakatani (2:02.72); Maki Mita (2:01.33); Suzu Chiba (2:01.16); Yasuko Tajima (2:03.22)	Japan	8:08.33	
5	Deanna Schonwald (2:04.21); Helen Norfolk (2:03.93); Elizabeth Van Welie (2:07.41); Alison Fitch (2:05.15)	New Zealand	8:20.70	
6	Chiang Tzu-ying (2:08.37); Sung Yi-chieh (2:10.82); Lin Fang-tzu (2:18.95); Kuan Chia-hsien (2:09.20)	Chinese Taipei	8:47.34	
