= 1993 FINA World Swimming Championships (25 m) – Women's 4 × 200 metre freestyle relay =

The finals and the qualifying heats of the Women's 4 × 200 metres Freestyle Relay event at the 1993 FINA Short Course World Championships were held in Palma de Mallorca, Spain.

== Final ==
Rank	Final	Time
	China; Shan Ying; Zhou Guanbin; Le Jingyi; Lü Bin	7:52.45 WR
	Australia; Tammy Bruce; Elli Overton; Anna Windsor; Susie O'Neill	7:56.52
	United States; Paige Wilson; Sarah Perroni; Trina Jackson; Janet Evans	8:02.99
4.	Canada; Sarah Evanetz; Shannon Shakespeare; Joanne Malar; Patricia Levesque	8:09.08
