= 2026 Pan Pacific Swimming Championships – Women's 100 metre backstroke =

Women's 100 metre backstroke at the 2026 Pan Pacific Swimming Championships
- Venue: William Woollett Jr. Aquatics Center
- Dates: August 12
- Competitors: 31 from 12 nations
- Winning time: 57.93

Medalists
gold medal	Katharine Berkoff	United States
silver medal	Regan Smith	United States
bronze medal	Taylor Ruck	Canada

Official Video (heats)

Official Video (B and A final)

The women's 100 metre backstroke event at the 2026 Pan Pacific Swimming Championships was held on August 12 at the William Woollett Jr. Aquatics Center in Irvine, California. It was the fifth of 41 events on the four-day pool swimming program and the 14th edition of the event, which had been contested at every previous championship since 1985. A total of 31 swimmers from 12 nations contested the event.

Reigning 50 metre backstroke world champion Katharine Berkoff of the United States won the event in 57.93, ahead of her compatriot and world record holder Regan Smith, who claimed the silver medal in 58.11. Canada's Taylor Ruck won the bronze medal in 58.40, while Australia's Iona Anderson finished fourth in 59.53.

== Competition format and event history ==
The Pan Pacific Swimming Championships is an international long course swimming competition first held in 1985. It was established as an alternative to the European Championships and is open to nations that are not members of European Aquatics. (Note: At a meeting of the four charter nations of the Pan Pacific Swimming Association (the United States, Australia, Canada and Japan) on August 23, 2024, it was agreed that the 10 kilometre open water events at the 2026 championships would be open to all members of European Aquatics wishing to participate, with a maximum of two entries per nation in each event.) The 2026 championships featured 41 swimming events in the pool across four days, from August 12 to 15, preceded by the men's and women's 10 km open water swimming events on August 10. The women's 100 metre backstroke was the seventh event overall and the fifth on the pool swimming program, following the women's and men's 50 metre butterfly events and the women's and men's 200 metre freestyle.

The event consisted of preliminary heats followed by an A final and a B final, with no semifinals contested. Both the heats and finals were held on August 12, the opening day of pool competition. Under the championship regulations, each nation could enter an unlimited number of swimmers in the preliminary heats. However, only the two fastest eligible swimmers from each nation could advance to the A final, following any withdrawals. Each nation could also qualify up to two additional swimmers for the B final, regardless of whether it had one or two representatives in the A final. Consequently, a maximum of four swimmers per nation could compete across both finals. The eight A finalists contested the medals and championship points, while the B final determined the remaining eligible finishing positions.

The women's 100 metre backstroke was one of 32 events contested at every edition of the Pan Pacific Swimming Championships, making its 2026 appearance the fourteenth in championship history. American Betsy Mitchell won the inaugural title at the 1985 championships in Tokyo in 1:02.88. Two years later, Australia's Nicole Livingstone won the 1987 championships in Brisbane in an Australian and Commonwealth record time of 1:02.64. American Lea Loveless claimed the 1989 title in Tokyo in 1:02.69, before compatriot Janie Wagstaff won in Edmonton in 1991, setting national and championship records of 1:01.00. Loveless regained the title at the 1993 championships in Kobe, winning in 1:01.35.

Japan subsequently enjoyed a period of success, winning the event at three consecutive championships. At the 1995 championships in Atlanta, Noriko Inada became the first Japanese winner, claiming gold in a national record time of 1:02.02. Her compatriot Mai Nakamura extended Japan's winning streak at the 1997 championships in Fukuoka, claiming the title in 1:01.13. Nakamura retained her title at the 1999 championships in Sydney, sharing the gold medal with Australia's Dyana Calub after both swimmers finished in a dead heat for first place in 1:01.51. The time also established a new Australian and Commonwealth record for Calub.

At the 2002 championships in Yokohama, American Natalie Coughlin became the first swimmer to break the one-minute barrier in the event at the Pan Pacific Championships, winning in a championship record time of 59.72 and surpassing Wagstaff's 1991 mark of 1:01.00. Her winning time was just 0.14 seconds outside the world record of 59.58 she had established at the US Nationals 13 days earlier, when she became the first woman to swim the distance in under one minute. Coughlin was unable to retain her title at the 2006 championships in Victoria, Canada, where Japan's Hanae Ito defeated her by just 0.03 seconds, winning in 1:00.63 to Coughlin's 1:00.66.

At the 2010 championships in Irvine, Australia's Emily Seebohm broke Coughlin's 2002 championship record in the preliminary heats, recording 59.62. She subsequently won the gold medal in the final, lowering the mark further to 59.45. Three days later, Seebohm improved the championship record for a third time, clocking 59.34 on the backstroke lead-off leg of Australia's women's 4 × 100 metre medley relay. Seebohm retained her individual title at the 2014 championships on the Gold Coast, lowering the championship record to 58.84 and establishing a new Australian all-comers record.

At the 2018 championships in Tokyo, Seebohm lowered her championship record to 58.79 in the opening heat, only for Canada's Kylie Masse to improve it further to 58.29 in the following heat. Masse qualified fastest for the final ahead of American Kathleen Baker, who had established a world record of 58.00 less than two weeks earlier at the US Nationals. In the final, Baker led at the halfway mark, but Masse overtook her during the second 50 metres to win the gold medal in 58.61. Seebohm claimed silver in 58.72, while Baker finished third in 58.83. Regan Smith, who had lowered her own world junior record to 58.83 at the same US Nationals, placed fourth in 58.95.

The 2022 championships were cancelled due to the COVID-19 pandemic, leaving Masse's 2018 preliminary time of 58.29 as the championship record entering the 2026 edition.

== Race summary ==
=== Withdrawals ===
A total of 31 swimmers from 12 nations contested the event. Three other swimmers were included on the preliminary entry list but did not contest the event. Chinese Taipei's Applejean Gwinn withdrew to focus on the women's 200 metre butterfly, which was also contested on the opening day. She subsequently finished eighth in the A final of that event. The Philippines' Kayla Sanchez also withdrew from the backstroke, instead contesting the 50 and 100 metre freestyle events, in which she finished sixth in both A finals. Australia's Kaylee McKeown, the two-time defending Olympic champion (2021 and 2024), two-time world champion (2023 and 2025) and former world record holder in the event, was also included but withdrew from the meet because of glandular fever.

Another notable absentee was Canada's Kylie Masse, the defending Pan Pacific champion and championship record holder, who had previously won the 2017 and 2019 world titles in the event, setting a world record at the former, as well as the 2018 Commonwealth Games title. Masse elected not to compete at the 2026 championships. She had instead competed at the 2026 Commonwealth Games in Glasgow, where she won silver in the event.

=== Heats ===
Three American swimmers broke the championship record in successive heats, surpassing the previous mark of 58.29 set by Masse at the 2018 championships. Claire Curzan first lowered the record to 58.21 in the second heat, improving on her previous personal best of 58.29 set in 2024. Katharine Berkoff lowered the record to 58.09 in the third heat, before Regan Smith improved it to 57.86 in the fourth and final heat, becoming the first swimmer to break 58 seconds in the event at the Pan Pacific Championships.

Smith qualified fastest overall in 57.86, followed by Berkoff in 58.09 and Curzan in 58.21. Canada's Taylor Ruck recorded the fourth-fastest time of 58.58, while American Leah Shackley placed fifth overall in 59.06. Two further Americans, Rylee Erisman and Phoebe Bacon, finished sixth and eighth overall in 59.67 and 59.74, respectively. Despite their performances, Curzan, Shackley, Erisman and Bacon were excluded from the A final under the two-swimmers-per-nation restriction, with Smith and Berkoff occupying the two American places. Curzan and Shackley instead advanced to the B final, while Erisman and Bacon were excluded from both finals.

Australia's Hannah Fredericks recorded the seventh-fastest time of 59.69 and advanced to the A final, alongside China's Wan Letian and Yu Yiting, who placed ninth and tenth overall in 59.90 and 59.94, respectively. Canada's Ingrid Wilm qualified eleventh overall in 59.96, followed by Australia's Iona Anderson in twelfth with 1:00.13. All five advanced to the A final under the nationality restriction. New Zealand's Milan Glintmeyer, Canada's Reina Liu and Japan's Rio Shirai were among the swimmers who qualified for the B final. Glintmeyer recorded a time of 1:00.34, establishing a New Zealand national age-group record for 18-year-old swimmers. The Philippines' Chloe Isleta and Regan Smith were the only two swimmers to contest the event at both the 2018 and 2026 championships. Isleta finished 29th in 1:04.05, improving upon her performances at the 2018 championships, where she recorded 1:05.08 in the heats and 1:05.03 in the B final. China's Peng Xuwei was disqualified in the fourth heat, leaving 30 swimmers with recorded times.

=== B final ===
In the evening session, American Claire Curzan, the 2024 world champion, won the B final in 58.24, having been excluded from the A final despite recording the third-fastest time in the preliminary heats. Her winning time was only 0.03 seconds outside the personal best of 58.21 she had established in the morning heats and was faster than the performances of six of the eight A finalists. Curzan led throughout the race, reaching the halfway mark in 27.92 before completing the second 50 metres in 30.32.

Curzan's compatriot Leah Shackley finished second in 59.59, followed by New Zealand's Milan Glintmeyer in third with 1:00.74. Canada's Reina Liu placed fourth in 1:00.78, ahead of Japan's Rio Shirai in fifth with 1:01.11. Canada's Madison Kryger finished sixth in 1:01.20, followed by New Zealand's Amber George in seventh with 1:01.32. Mexico's Celia Pulido completed the B final in eighth place with 1:01.65.

=== A final ===
American Katharine Berkoff, the bronze medalist in the event at the 2024 Olympics and the 2023 and 2025 World Championships, entered the A final as the second-fastest qualifier. She qualified behind compatriot Regan Smith, the reigning world record holder, who had established a championship record of 57.86 in the morning heats. Smith had previously won the 2022 world title and finished second behind Australia's Kaylee McKeown at the 2023 World Championships, 2024 Olympics and 2025 World Championships.

Canada's Taylor Ruck led at the halfway mark in 28.28, narrowly ahead of Berkoff in 28.31 and Smith in 28.47. Berkoff overtook Ruck during the second half of the race, recording a closing 50-metre split of 29.62 to win the gold medal in 57.93. Smith finished second in 58.11, just 0.18 seconds behind Berkoff, while Ruck claimed bronze in 58.40, a further 0.29 seconds behind Smith. Berkoff's winning time was 0.07 seconds outside Smith's championship record from the heats. Smith's silver medal improved upon her fourth-place finish at the 2018 championships, while Ruck's bronze was her second medal of the evening, having also finished third in the women's 50 metre butterfly. Ruck's bronze-medal time of 58.40 was just 0.03 seconds outside her lifetime best of 58.37, established at the Canadian trials in July 2026. Ruck had been listed to contest the event at the 2018 championships but did not start the preliminary heats.

Australia's Iona Anderson finished fourth in 59.53, 0.82 seconds slower than the 58.71 she had recorded to win the Commonwealth title in Glasgow the previous month. Her performance was also 1.10 seconds outside her lifetime best of 58.43, established at the 2024 Australian Olympic trials. Canada's Ingrid Wilm followed in fifth place with 59.82, ahead of Australia's Hannah Fredericks, who finished sixth in 1:00.05. China's Wan Letian, the Asian Games champion, placed seventh in 1:00.21, while her compatriot Yu Yiting completed the final in eighth place with 1:00.23.

Following the race, Berkoff expressed satisfaction with her performance, describing it as her fastest time since the 2024 US Olympic trials, where she had established her lifetime best of 57.83, just 0.10 seconds faster than her winning time in the final. She also noted that she had become more comfortable competing in outdoor pools, despite the additional challenges of racing after dark. The victory marked Berkoff's first senior international title in the 100 metre backstroke and her second individual senior international gold medal, following her triumph in the 50 metre backstroke at the 2025 World Championships in Singapore. Smith, by contrast, expressed frustration with her performance, having recorded a slower time than in the morning heats. She nevertheless emphasized her determination to put the result behind her, avoid allowing her disappointment to affect her teammates, and use the experience as motivation for her remaining events, particularly the 50 metre backstroke.

== Records ==
Prior to this competition, the existing records were as follows:

Records before the 2026 Pan Pacific Swimming Championships
Record	Time (s)	Athlete (nation)	Meet	Location	Date	Ref
World record	57.13	Regan Smith (USA)	2024 U.S. Olympic Trials	Indianapolis, United States	June 18, 2024	
Championship record	58.29	Kylie Masse (CAN)	2018 Pan Pacs	Tokyo, Japan	August 9, 2018	

== Schedule ==
The schedule was as follows:

All times are Pacific Daylight Time (UTC−7)

Schedule
Date	Time	Round
Wednesday, August 12, 2026	10:53	Heats
Wednesday, August 12, 2026	19:58	Finals

== Results ==
=== Heats ===
The heats were held at 10:53 on August 12, 2026.

Key: QA = Qualified for A final; QB = Qualified for B final; R = Reserve; CR = Championship record; DSQ = Disqualified.

Heat results
Rank	Heat	Lane	Swimmer	Nation	Time	Notes
1	4	4	Regan Smith	United States	57.86	QA, CR
2	3	4	Katharine Berkoff	United States	58.09	QA, CR
3	2	4	Claire Curzan	United States	58.21	QB, CR
4	4	5	Taylor Ruck	Canada	58.58	QA
5	3	5	Leah Shackley	United States	59.06	QB
6	2	6	Rylee Erisman	United States	59.67	
7	3	6	Hannah Fredericks	Australia	59.69	QA
8	4	3	Phoebe Bacon	United States	59.74	
9	2	3	Wan Letian	China	59.90	QA
10	2	2	Yu Yiting	China	59.94	QA
11	3	3	Ingrid Wilm	Canada	59.96	QA
12	2	5	Iona Anderson	Australia	1:00.13	QA
13	3	7	Milan Glintmeyer	New Zealand	1:00.34	QB
14	2	1	Reina Liu	Canada	1:00.46	QB
15	4	2	Rio Shirai	Japan	1:00.78	QB
16	3	2	Madison Kryger	Canada	1:01.15	QB
17	2	7	Celia Pulido	Mexico	1:01.28	QB
18	3	1	Amber George	New Zealand	1:01.42	QB
19	4	1	Miri Sasaki	Japan	1:01.45	R
20	3	8	Daniela Linares Danzos	Mexico	1:01.73	R
21	4	7	Lu Xingchen	China	1:02.05	
22	1	5	Tayla Jonker	South Africa	1:02.07	
23	4	8	Savannah-Eve Martin	New Zealand	1:02.41	
24	1	3	Malena Santillan	Argentina	1:02.61	
25	2	8	Shiho Matsumoto	Japan	1:02.70	
26	1	2	Levenia Sim	Singapore	1:02.84	
27	1	1	Cheng Yujie	China	1:02.89	
28	1	4	Emma Harvey	Bermuda	1:03.13	
29	1	7	Chloe Isleta	Philippines	1:04.05	
30	1	6	Grace Morris	South Africa	1:04.42	
	4	6	Peng Xuwei	China	DSQ	

=== B final ===
The B final was held at 19:58 on August 12, 2026.

B final results
Rank	Lane	Swimmer	Nation	Time	Notes
9	4	Claire Curzan	United States	58.24	
10	5	Leah Shackley	United States	59.59	
11	3	Milan Glintmeyer	New Zealand	1:00.74	
12	6	Reina Liu	Canada	1:00.78	
13	2	Rio Shirai	Japan	1:01.11	
14	7	Madison Kryger	Canada	1:01.20	
15	8	Amber George	New Zealand	1:01.32	
16	1	Celia Pulido	Mexico	1:01.65	

=== A final ===
The A final was held after the B final on August 12, 2026.

A final results
Rank	Lane	Swimmer	Nation	Time	Points (Note: A team trophy was awarded to the nation scoring the most points. In individual events, points were awarded on a 9–7–6–5–4–3–2–1 basis for first through eighth place in the A final. In relay events, points were awarded on an 18–14–12–10–8–6–4–2 basis for the first- through eighth-place teams in the A final. The United States won the team title with 540.5 points, ahead of Australia (409), Japan (228) and Canada (220).)	Notes
1st place, gold medalist(s)	5	Katharine Berkoff	United States	57.93	9	
2nd place, silver medalist(s)	4	Regan Smith	United States	58.11	7	
3rd place, bronze medalist(s)	3	Taylor Ruck	Canada	58.40	6	
4	8	Iona Anderson	Australia	59.53	5	
5	1	Ingrid Wilm	Canada	59.82	4	
6	6	Hannah Fredericks	Australia	1:00.05	3	
7	2	Wan Letian	China	1:00.21	2	
8	7	Yu Yiting	China	1:00.23	1	
