= Swimming at the 1998 Commonwealth Games – Women's 4 × 200 metre freestyle relay =

Women's 4 × 200 metre freestyle relay at the 1998 Commonwealth Games
- Venue: KL Sports City
- Dates: 12 September 1998
- Competitors: 20 from 5 nations
- Winning time: 8:03.73

Medalists
gold medal	Julia Greville, Susie O'Neill, Anna Windsor, Lori Munz	Australia
silver medal	Claire Huddart, Karen Legg, Lyndsey Cooper, Karen Pickering	England
bronze medal	Jessica Deglau, Andrea Schwartz, Laura Nicholls, Joanne Malar	Canada

The women's 4 × 200 metre freestyle relay event at the 1998 Commonwealth Games as part of the swimming programme took place on 12 September at KL Sports City in Kuala Lumpur, Malaysia.

== Records ==
Prior to this competition, the existing world and games records were as follows.

Commonwealth record	Australia	8:03.75	Atlanta, United States	11 August 1995

The following records were established during the competition:

Date	Event	Nation	Swimmers	Time	Record
12 September	Final	Australia	Julia Greville (2:01.41); Susie O'Neill (1:59.25); Anna Windsor (2:01.67); Lori Munz (2:01.40)	8:03.73	CR

== Results ==
Rank	Nation	Swimmers	Time	Notes
1st place, gold medalist(s)	Australia	Julia Greville (2:01.41); Susie O'Neill (1:59.25); Anna Windsor (2:01.67); Lori Munz (2:01.40)	8:01.39	GR
2nd place, silver medalist(s)	England	Claire Huddart (2:01.72); Karen Legg(2:00.24); Lyndsey Cooper(2:05.95); Karen Pickering (2:02.18)	8:10.09	
3	Canada	Jessica Deglau (2:01.89); Andrea Schwartz (2:03.09); Laura Nicholls (2:04.04); Joanne Malar (2:02.82)	8:11.84	
4	Wales	Victoria Hale (2:07.54); Bethan Coole (2:07.80); Catrin Davies (2:06.21); Sara Hopkins (2:06.62)	8:31.17	
5	Malaysia	Mui Nyee Teo (2:10.06); Lee San Chew (2:17.94); Hsu Eu Ho (2:15.40); Wai Yen Sia (2:14.74)	8:58.14	
