= Terry Deglau =

American photographer (1940–2019)

- Born: August 17, 1940; Latrobe, Pennsylvania, U.S.
- Died: September 14, 2019 (aged 79); Greensburg, Pennsylvania, U.S.
- Education: Rochester Institute of Technology (BS)
- Occupation: Photographer
- Employer: Eastman Kodak

Terry Deglau (August 17, 1940 – September 14, 2019) was a professional photographer known for taking group portraits of world leaders for the United Nations in 1995 and 2000, while working for Eastman Kodak.

== Early life and education ==
Terry Deglau was born in Latrobe, Pennsylvania. His father, Henry Deglau, was a professional photographer and owned Deglau Studio in Latrobe. Deglau took his first portrait at eight years old. He graduated from Derry Area High School in 1958, and earned his B.S. in photographic science from Rochester Institute of Technology in 1964.

== Career ==
After graduating college in 1964, Deglau returned to Latrobe to work at the family photography studio. For the next twenty years, Deglau did portrait and commercial photography at Deglau Studio, which also managed film development, printing, and framing. The studio was destroyed in a fire in the early 1970s, and Deglau rebuilt the business.

In 1984, Deglau was hired at Eastman Kodak, where he worked as marketing coordinator of professional photography. He served for many years as Eastman Kodak's liaison to the professional photographic community.

Deglau created group portraits of world leaders at the United Nations' 50th anniversary celebration in 1995 and at the United Nations' Millennium Summit in 2000. Deglau produced and organized the photography of the 100 4th of July people for the "Photo of the Century" July 4, 1999, in Philadelphia. Over his career, he created portraits of five U.S. Presidents.

Deglau was the recipient of many honors for his photography, including the Professional Photographers of America Director's Award, WPPI's Lifetime Achievement Award, and two PPA National Awards from Professional Photographers of Pennsylvania and Ohio Professional Photographers.

== Personal life ==
Terry Deglau is a distant relative of Canadian Olympic swimming star Jessica Deglau.

He died on September 14, 2019, in Greensburg, Pennsylvania.
