= Haike van Stralen =

Dutch swimmer (born 1983)

Personal information
- Full name: Haike Eva van Stralen
- National team: Netherlands
- Born: 22 April 1983 (age 43) Leusden, Netherlands
- Height: 1.70 m (5 ft 7 in)
- Weight: 59 kg (130 lb)

Sport
- Sport: Swimming
- Strokes: Freestyle
- Club: De Kempvis Spijkenisse
- Coach: Dick Bergsma

Haike Eva van Stralen (born 22 April 1983) is a Dutch former swimmer, who specialized in freestyle events. She is a two-time Olympian (2000 and 2004), and double Dutch short-course champion in the 200 and 400 m freestyle. Van Stralen also played for De Kempvis Swimming Club in Spijkenisse, under her personal coach Dick Bergsma.

Van Stralen made her first Dutch team, as a 17-year-old teen, at the 2000 Summer Olympics in Sydney. She placed eleventh, along with Carla Geurts, Chantal Groot, and Manon van Rooijen, in the 4 × 200 m freestyle relay with a time of 8:08.53.

Four years later, at the 2004 Summer Olympics in Athens, Van Stralen competed again in the women's 4 × 200 m freestyle relay as a member of the Dutch team. She claimed the 200 m freestyle from the Dutch National Championships in Amsterdam, posting her relay entry time of 2:02.21. Teaming with Groot, Marleen Veldhuis, and Celina Lemmen in heat two, van Stralen swam a second leg, and lowered her personal best to 2:01.80. Van Stralen and the entire Dutch team missed the top 8 final by almost two seconds, finishing only in fifth place and ninth overall with a final time of 8:08.96.
