= Lyndsey Cooper =

English swimmer

Personal information
- Nationality: British
- Born: Q2. 1981 Wigan

Sport
- Sport: Swimming
- Strokes: freestyle
- Club: Wigan Wasps
Medal record
Swimming
Representing England
Commonwealth Games
Silver medal – second place	1998 Kuala Lumpur	4 × 200 metre freestyle relay

Lyndsey Jayne Cooper (born Q2.1981) is a female former international swimmer from England.

== Swimming career ==
Cooper represented England and won a silver medal in the 4 x 200 metres freestyle relay event, at the 1998 Commonwealth Games in Kuala Lumpur, Malaysia.
