= Anna Windsor =

Australian swimmer (born 1976)

Personal information
- Full name: Anna Margaret Windsor
- National team: Australia
- Born: 17 May 1976 (age 50) Sydney
- Height: 1.75 m (5 ft 9 in)
- Weight: 61 kg (134 lb)

Sport
- Sport: Swimming
- Strokes: Freestyle
Medal record
Women's swimming
Representing Australia
World Championships (LC)
Bronze medal – third place	1998 Perth	4×200 m freestyle
World Championships (SC)
Silver medal – second place	1993 Mallorca	4×200 m freestyle
Silver medal – second place	1995 Rio	4×100 m freestyle
Bronze medal – third place	1995 Rio	4×200 m freestyle
Pan Pacific Swimming Championships
Silver medal – second place	1993 Kobe	4×100 m freestyle
Silver medal – second place	1993 Kobe	4×200 m freestyle
Silver medal – second place	1995 Atlanta	4×100 m freestyle
Silver medal – second place	1995 Atlanta	4×200 m freestyle
Bronze medal – third place	1995 Atlanta	200 m medley
Commonwealth Games
Gold medal – first place	1994 Victoria	4×200 m freestyle
Gold medal – first place	1998 Kuala Lumpur	4×200 m freestyle

Anna Margaret Windsor (born 17 May 1976) is an Australian former competitive swimmer who won four medals in freestyle relays at the world championships in 1993, 1995 and 1998. She also competed at the 1996 and 2000 Summer Olympics and finished sixth in the 4×100-metre freestyle relay in 1996.

She was born in Sydney, but her family moved to Orange, New South Wales when she was eight months old. After the 2000 Olympics, she retired from swimming to focus on her studies. She received a university degree in medicine in 2004.

She has previously been the Regional Head of General Practice training for Western NSW and currently sits on the board of MDA National.

She has a son, born in 2006, and a daughter, born in 2008.
