= 1993 FINA World Swimming Championships (25 m) – Women's 200 metre freestyle =

These are the official results of the Women's 200 metres Freestyle event at the 1993 FINA Short Course World Championships held in Palma de Mallorca, Spain.

== Finals ==
RANK	FINAL A	TIME
	Karen Pickering (GBR)	1:56.25
	Susie O'Neill (AUS)	1:57.16
	Lü Bin (CHN)	1:57.71
4.	Martina Moravcová (SVK)	1:58.21
5.	Shannon Shakespeare (CAN)	1:58.85
6.	Sachiko Miyaji (JPN)	1:59.13
7.	Paige Wilson (USA)	1:59.63
8.	Shan Ying (CHN)	1:59.71

== Qualifying heats ==
RANK	HEATS RANKING	TIME
1.	Karen Pickering (GBR)	1:57.68
2.	Susie O'Neill (AUS)	1:59.07
3.	Lü Bin (CHN)	1:59.16
4.	Shannon Shakespeare (CAN)	1:59.36
5.	Martina Moravcová (SVK)	1:59.44
6.	Sachiko Miyaji (JPN)	2:00.29
7.	Shan Ying (CHN)	2:00.50
8.	Paige Wilson (USA)	2:00.58

== See also ==
- 1992 Women's Olympic Games 200m Freestyle
- 1993 Women's European LC Championships 200m Freestyle
