= Celina Lemmen =

Dutch swimmer (born 1985)

Personal information
- Full name: Celina Johanna Maria Lemmen
- National team: Netherlands
- Born: 3 February 1985 (age 41) Amsterdam, Netherlands
- Height: 1.79 m (5 ft 10 in)
- Weight: 67 kg (148 lb)

Sport
- Sport: Swimming
- Strokes: Freestyle
- Club: De Kempvis Spijkenisse
- College team: Southern Methodist University (U.S.)
- Coach: Dick Bergsma; Steve Collins (U.S.)
Medal record
Women's swimming
Representing the Netherlands
European Junior Championships
Silver medal – second place	2001 Valletta	200 m freestyle
Bronze medal – third place	2001 Valletta	100 m freestyle

Celina Johanna Maria Lemmen (born March 2, 1985) is a Dutch swimmer who specialized in freestyle events. She is a single-time Olympian (2004), and a double medalist in sprint freestyle at the 2001 European Junior Championships in Valletta, Malta.

Lemmen grew up in San Antonio, Texas, where she attended Ronald Reagan High School and competed for their swim team. She then attended Southern Methodist University in Dallas, Texas, where she majored in management, and swam for the SMU Mustangs under head coach Steve Collins. While studying in the United States on an athletic scholarship, Lemmen has earned numerous high school and state titles, and received two-year All-American honors in college swimming.

Lemmen made swimming history in the international scene at the 2001 European Junior Championships in Valletta, Malta, where she won a total of two medals: a silver in the 200 m freestyle (2:03.27), and a bronze in the 100 m freestyle (57.47).

Three years later, at the 2004 Summer Olympics in Athens, Lemmen qualified only for the women's 4 × 200 m freestyle relay as a member of the Dutch team. She posted a relay entry time of 2:02.37 from the ConocoPhillips Spring National Championships in Orlando, Florida. Teaming with Marleen Veldhuis, Chantal Groot, and Haike van Stralen in heat two, Lemmen swam a lead-off leg and recorded a split of 2:02.21. Lemmen and the entire Dutch team missed the top 8 final by almost two seconds, finishing only in fifth place and ninth overall with a final time of 8:08.96.
