= Janina-Kristin Götz =

German swimmer (born 1981)

Personal information
- Full name: Janina-Kristin Götz
- Nationality: German
- Born: 13 January 1981 (age 45) Bayreuth, West Germany
- Height: 1.72 m (5 ft 7 1/2 in)
- Weight: 60 kg (132 lb)

Sport
- Sport: Swimming
Medal record
Women's swimming
Representing Germany
Olympic Games
Bronze medal – third place	2004 Athens	4×200 m freestyle

Janina-Kristin Götz (born 10 January 1981) is a German swimmer, who won bronze medal in the 2004 Summer Olympics.

At the Athens she swam in 4×200 m freestyle distance heats.
