= 2018 Pan Pacific Swimming Championships – Women's 100 metre backstroke =

Women's 100 metre backstroke at the 2018 Pan Pacific Swimming Championships
- Venue: Tokyo Tatsumi International Swimming Center
- Dates: 10 August (heats & finals)
- Competitors: 19 from 10 nations
- Winning time: 58.61

Medalists
gold medal	Kylie Masse	Canada
silver medal	Emily Seebohm	Australia
bronze medal	Kathleen Baker	United States

The women's 100 metre backstroke competition at the 2018 Pan Pacific Swimming Championships took place on August 10 at the Tokyo Tatsumi International Swimming Center. The defending champion was Emily Seebohm of Australia.

== Records ==
Prior to this competition, the existing world and Pan Pacific records were as follows:

World record	Kathleen Baker (USA)	58.00	Irvine, United States	28 July 2018
Pan Pacific Championships record	Emily Seebohm (AUS)	58.84	Gold Coast, Australia	21 August 2014

== Results ==
All times are in minutes and seconds.

KEY:	QA	Qualified A Final	QB	Qualified B Final	CR	Championships record	NR	National record	PB	Personal best	SB	Seasonal best

=== Heats ===
The first round was held on 10 August from 10:00.

Only two swimmers from each country may advance to the A or B final. If a country not qualify any swimmer to the A final, that same country may qualify up to three swimmers to the B final.

Rank	Name	Nationality	Time	Notes
1	Kylie Masse	Canada	58.29	QA, CR
2	Kathleen Baker	United States	58.41	QA
3	Emily Seebohm	Australia	58.79	QA
4	Regan Smith	United States	59.27	QA
5	Natsumi Sakai	Japan	59.45	QA
6	Olivia Smoliga	United States	59.47	QB
7	Kaylee McKeown	Australia	59.91	QA
8	Anna Konishi	Japan	1:00.30	QA
9	Kennedy Goss	Canada	1:00.93	QA
10	Isabella Arcila	Colombia	1:01.54	QB
11	Alex Galyer	New Zealand	1:01.61	QB
12	Danielle Hanus	Canada	1:01.78	QB
13	Yang Yifan	China	1:02.20	QB
14	Chloe Isleta	Philippines	1:05.08	QB
15	Gianna Garcia	Philippines	1:12.93	QB
16	Osisang Chilton	Palau	1:18.54	QB
–	Taylor Ruck	Canada	DNS	
–	Sayaka Akase	Japan	DNS	
–	McKenna DeBever	Peru	DSQ	

=== B Final ===
The B final was held on 10 August from 18:00.

Rank	Name	Nationality	Time	Notes
9	Olivia Smoliga	United States	59.20	
10	Isabella Arcila	Colombia	1:01.39	
11	Yang Yifan	China	1:01.58	
12	Alex Galyer	New Zealand	1:01.67	
13	Danielle Hanus	Canada	1:01.68	
14	Chloe Isleta	Philippines	1:05.03	
15	Gianna Garcia	Philippines	1:11.66	
16	Osisang Chilton	Palau	1:17.14	

=== A Final ===
The A final was held on 10 August from 18:00.

Rank	Name	Nationality	Time	Notes
1st place, gold medalist(s)	Kylie Masse	Canada	58.61	
2nd place, silver medalist(s)	Emily Seebohm	Australia	58.72	
3rd place, bronze medalist(s)	Kathleen Baker	United States	58.83	
4	Regan Smith	United States	58.95	
5	Kaylee McKeown	Australia	59.25	
6	Natsumi Sakai	Japan	59.33	
7	Kennedy Goss	Canada	1:00.90	
–	Anna Konishi	Japan	DSQ	
