= Carly Piper =

American swimmer

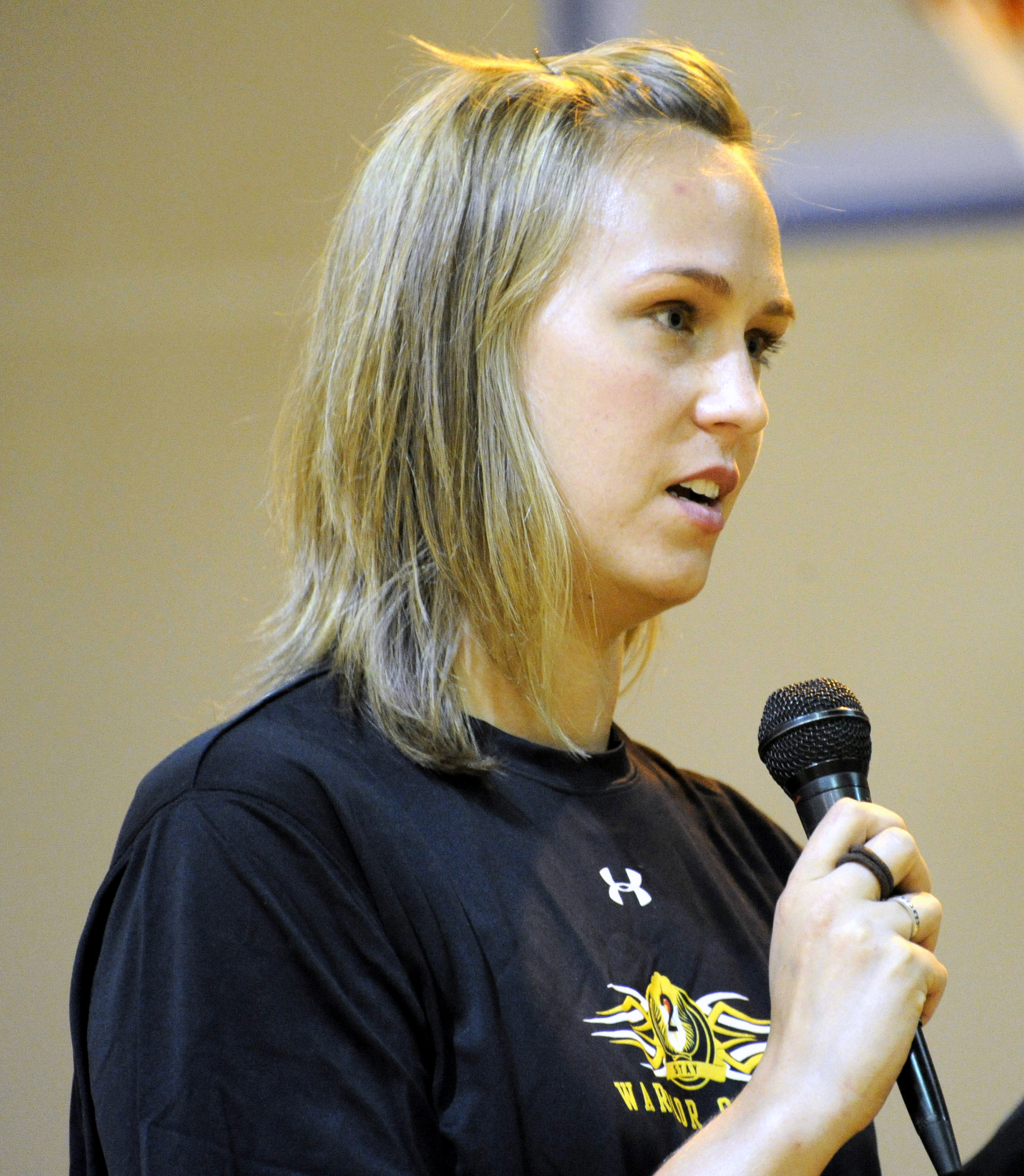
- Piper speaking to U.S. troops in 2010

Personal information
- Full name: Carly Ryan
- National team: United States
- Born: Carly Piper; September 23, 1983 (age 43) Grosse Pointe, Michigan, U.S.
- Height: 6 ft 2 in (188 cm)
- Weight: 179 lb (81 kg)
- Spouse: Shane Ryan (2014–present)

Sport
- Sport: Swimming
- Strokes: Freestyle
- Club: SwimMAC Carolina
- College team: University of Wisconsin–Madison
Medal record
Women's swimming
Representing the United States
Olympic Games
Gold medal – first place	2004 Athens	4 x 200 m freestyle
World Championships (SC)
Bronze medal – third place	2006 Shanghai	4x200 m freestyle
Pan American Games
Gold medal – first place	2003 Sto Domingo	4x200 m freestyle

Carly Piper (born September 23, 1983), also known by her married name Carly Ryan, is an American former professional competitive swimmer and Olympic gold medalist. As part of the American team, she helped set a new world record in the women's 4×200-meter freestyle relay (long course).

== Biography ==
Piper was born in Grosse Pointe, Michigan in 1983, the daughter of Kenneth and Carol Ann Piper. Her father worked for General Dynamics, a defense contractor, and her mother was an aerobics instructor. Piper has one older sister, Cortney, who is also a swimmer and swam for the University of Tennessee. Piper is a 2001 graduate of Grosse Pointe North High School in Grosse Pointe Woods, Michigan. Piper attended the University of Wisconsin–Madison and graduated in 2006, majoring in zoology. At the University of Wisconsin–Madison, she had a highly successful career on the women's swimming team and served as the team's captain. She twice won Big Ten Conference swimmer of the year honors and was an 18-time All-American. While still in school, and after she had exhausted her athletic eligibility, she served as a volunteer assistant coach with the Wisconsin Badgers swimming teams.

Carly married swim coach Shane Ryan on May 16, 2014. In 2015, they started their coach owned team called the Madison Aquatic Club, located in Madison, WI. Shane and Carly have a son, and two daughters.

== Swimming career ==
At the 2004 U.S. Olympic Team Trials, Piper qualified for the 2004 Summer Olympics by finishing 5th in the 200-meter freestyle. She also placed 6th in the 400-meter freestyle.

At the 2004 Summer Olympics in Athens, Piper won a gold medal in the 4×200-meter freestyle relay with Natalie Coughlin, Kaitlin Sandeno, and Dana Vollmer that set the world record in the event. On December 20, 2004 it was declared "Carly Piper Day" in Piper's hometown of Grosse Pointe Woods, Michigan for her accomplishments in Athens.

== See also ==
- List of Olympic medalists in swimming (women)
- Pan American Games records in swimming
- World record progression 4 × 200 metres freestyle relay
