= Roh Joo-hee =

South Korean swimmer (born 1983)

Personal information
- Full name: Roh Joo-hee
- National team: South Korea
- Born: 18 March 1983 (age 43) Seoul, South Korea
- Height: 1.72 m (5 ft 8 in)
- Weight: 55 kg (121 lb)

Korean name
- Hangul: 노주희
- RR: No Juhui
- MR: No Chuhŭi

Sport
- Sport: Swimming
- Strokes: Freestyle, breaststroke

Roh Joo-hee (Korean: 노주희; born March 18, 1983) is a South Korean former swimmer, who specialized in middle-distance freestyle and breaststroke events. As a teenager, she represented South Korea in two editions of the Olympic Games (1996 and 2000), and also held numerous career bests and national records in both 200 and 400 m freestyle.

Roh made her Olympic debut, as South Korea's youngest ever swimmer in history (aged 13), at the 1996 Summer Olympics in Atlanta. She failed to reach the top 16 final in the 200 m breaststroke, finishing only in twenty-eighth place at 2:36.20.

At the 2000 Summer Olympics in Sydney, Roh competed only in a middle-distance freestyle double. She achieved FINA B-standards of 2:03.40 (200 m freestyle) and 4:20.02 (400 m freestyle) from the Asian Championships in Busan. On the second day of the Games, Roh placed thirty-seventh in the 400 m freestyle. Swimming in heat two, she faded down the stretch to pick up a seventh seed in 4:25.66, more than a dozen body length behind leader Laetitia Choux of France. The following day, in the 200 m freestyle, Roh posted a time of 2:07.21 to round out the field in heat three, but finished only in thirty-third place on the morning prelims.
