= Zhu Yingwen =

Chinese swimmer (born 1981)

Personal information
- Full name: 朱穎文
- Nationality: China
- Born: September 9, 1981 (age 44) Shanghai
- Height: 173 cm (5 ft 8 in)
- Weight: 68 kg (150 lb)

Sport
- Sport: Swimming
- Strokes: Freestyle
Medal record
Women's swimming
Representing China
Olympic Games
Silver medal – second place	2004 Athens	4x200 m freestyle
World Championships (LC)
Bronze medal – third place	2005 Montreal	50 m freestyle
Bronze medal – third place	2005 Montreal	4x200 m freestyle
World Championships (SC)
Gold medal – first place	2002 Moscow	4x200 m freestyle
Bronze medal – third place	2002 Moscow	4x100 m freestyle
Bronze medal – third place	2002 Moscow	4x100 m medley

Zhu Yingwen (simplified Chinese: 朱颖文; traditional Chinese: 朱穎文; pinyin: Zhū Yǐngwén; born September 9, 1981, in Shanghai) is a female Olympic medal-winning swimmer from the People's Republic of China, who competed at the 2004 Olympic Games in Athens.

Along with Xu Yanwei, Yang Yu, and Pang Jiaying, she was part of China's 4 × 200 m freestyle relay team, which won the silver medal, beaten by the US relay team.

She was also part of China's 4 × 100 m women's freestyle relay team and 4 × 100 m women's medley relay team. China reached the final in both of these events but did not win a medal.

Zhu competed as an individual in the 50m freestyle event, but did not progress beyond the heat stage.
