= Swimming at the 2004 Summer Olympics – Women's 4 × 200 metre freestyle relay =

Women's 4 × 200 metre freestyle relay at the Games of the XXVIII Olympiad
- Venue: Olympic Aquatic Centre
- Dates: 18 August 2004 (heats & final)
- Competitors: 74 from 16 nations
- Teams: 16
- Winning time: 7:53.42 WR

Medalists
1st place, gold medalist(s)		Natalie Coughlin, Carly Piper, Dana Vollmer, Kaitlin Sandeno, Lindsay Benko*, Rhi Jeffrey*, Rachel Komisarz*	United States
2nd place, silver medalist(s)		Zhu Yingwen, Xu Yanwei, Yang Yu, Pang Jiaying, Li Ji*	China
3rd place, bronze medalist(s)		Franziska van Almsick, Petra Dallmann, Antje Buschschulte, Hannah Stockbauer, Janina Götz*, Sara Harstick*; *Indicates the swimmer only competed in the preliminary heats.	Germany

The women's 4 × 200 metre freestyle relay took place on 18 August at the Olympic Aquatic Centre of the Athens Olympic Sports Complex in Athens, Greece.

The U.S. women's swimming team (Natalie Coughlin, Carly Piper, Dana Vollmer, and Kaitlin Sandeno) broke the oldest world record in the book, when they clocked at 7:53.42, slashing 2.05 seconds off the old, mark set by the East Germans exactly 17 years ago. Leading off the race, Coughlin swam a fastest split and a personal best of 1:57.74, which became quicker than a gold-medal performance of 1:58.03 set by Romania's Camelia Potec in the individual 200 m freestyle.

With Team USA taking its third straight title since the event's Olympic debut in 1996, China made a surprise packet with a silver medal, in an Asian record of 7:55.97. Meanwhile, the unified Germans held off the Aussies for the bronze in 7:57.35, 45-hundredths of a second under an old Olympic record set by Team USA in 2000. Despite missing the podium by 0.05 of a second, the Australians broke their national record of 7:57.40 to settle only for fourth place.

== Records ==
Prior to this competition, the existing world and Olympic records were as follows.

World record	East Germany (GDR); Manuela Stellmach (2:00.23); Astrid Strauss (1:58.90); Anke Möhring (1:58.73); Heike Friedrich (1:57.61)	7:55.47	Strasbourg, France	18 August 1987
Olympic record	United States; Samantha Arsenault (1:59.92); Diana Munz (1:59.19); Lindsay Benko (1:59.34); Jenny Thompson (1:59.35)	7:57.80	Sydney, Australia	20 September 2000

The following new world and Olympic records were set during this competition.

Date	Event	Name	Nationality	Time	Record
August 18	Final	Natalie Coughlin (1:57.74); Carly Piper (1:59.39); Dana Vollmer (1:58.12); Kaitlin Sandeno (1:58.17)	United States	7:53.42	WR

== Results ==
=== Heats ===
Rank	Heat	Lane	Nation	Swimmers	Time	Notes
1	2	4	United States	Lindsay Benko (2:00.73); Rhi Jeffrey (2:01.46); Carly Piper (1:59.37); Rachel Komisarz (1:59.25)	8:00.81	Q
2	1	5	Great Britain	Karen Pickering (2:00.90); Joanne Jackson (2:00.89); Caitlin McClatchey (2:00.65); Melanie Marshall (1:59.33)	8:01.77	Q
3	1	4	Australia	Shayne Reese (2:00.13); Elka Graham (1:58.83); Linda Mackenzie (2:00.55); Giaan Rooney (2:02.34)	8:01.85	Q
4	1	2	Germany	Petra Dallmann (2:00.78); Janina Götz (2:00.87); Hannah Stockbauer (2:00.35); Sara Harstick (2:01.22)	8:03.22	Q
5	2	3	Spain	Tatiana Rouba (2:00.80); Melissa Caballero (2:00.64); Erika Villaécija (2:00.34); Arantxa Ramos (2:01.89)	8:03.67	Q
6	2	5	China	Zhu Yingwen (2:00.89); Li Ji (2:01.68); Yang Yu (1:59.91); Pang Jiaying (2:02.90)	8:05.38	Q
7	1	1	Brazil	Joanna Melo (2:01.38); Monique Ferreira (2:01.40); Mariana Brochado (2:01.68); Paula Baracho (2:01.12)	8:05.58	Q
8	1	3	Sweden	Ida Mattsson (2:02.46); Josefin Lillhage (1:59.19); Lotta Wanberg (2:02.85); Johanna Sjöberg (2:02.67)	8:07.17	Q
9	2	6	Netherlands	Celina Lemmen (2:02.21); Haike van Stralen (2:01.80); Chantal Groot (2:02.87); Marleen Veldhuis (2:02.08)	8:08.96	
10	1	6	France	Céline Couderc (2:02.50); Elsa N'Guessan (2:03.26); Katarin Quelennec (2:03.56); Solenne Figuès (2:00.10)	8:09.42	
11	2	2	Romania	Simona Păduraru (2:00.97); Larisa Lăcustă (2:03.80); Beatrice Câșlaru (2:04.20); Camelia Potec (2:00.70)	8:09.67	
12	2	7	Switzerland	Chantal Strasser (2:02.90); Hanna Miluska (2:02.75); Nicole Zahnd (2:01.60); Flavia Rigamonti (2:03.16)	8:10.41	
13	2	1	New Zealand	Helen Norfolk (2:01.89); Alison Fitch (2:00.70); Rebecca Linton (2:05.17); Nathalie Bernard (2:07.00)	8:14.76	
14	1	7	Italy	Alessia Filippi (2:04.09); Sara Parise (2:03.69); Cecilia Vianini (2:03.52); Cristina Chiuso (2:04.00)	8:15.30	
15	1	8	Greece	Zoi Dimoschaki (2:02.33); Marianna Lymperta (2:02.71); Evangelia Tsagka (2:05.99); Georgia Manoli (2:05.66)	8:16.69	
16	2	8	Slovenia	Sara Isaković (2:01.82); Anja Klinar (2:03.44); Anja Čarman (2:03.19); Lavra Babič (2:08.44)	8:16.89	

=== Final ===
Rank	Lane	Nation	Swimmers	Time	Time behind	Notes
1st place, gold medalist(s)	4	United States	Natalie Coughlin (1:57.74); Carly Piper (1:59.39); Dana Vollmer (1:58.12); Kaitlin Sandeno (1:58.17)	7:53.42		WR
2nd place, silver medalist(s)	7	China	Zhu Yingwen (1:59.75); Xu Yanwei (1:58.45); Yang Yu (1:59.50); Pang Jiaying (1:58.27)	7:55.97	2.55	AS
3rd place, bronze medalist(s)	6	Germany	Franziska van Almsick (1:59.61); Petra Dallmann (2:00.06); Antje Buschschulte (1:58.46); Hannah Stockbauer (1:59.22)	7:57.35	3.93	
4	3	Australia	Alice Mills (2:00.38); Elka Graham (1:59.18); Shayne Reese (2:00.64); Petria Thomas (1:57.20)	7:57.40	3.98	OC
5	5	Great Britain	Melanie Marshall (1:59.39); Georgina Lee (2:00.50); Caitlin McClatchey (2:00.48); Karen Pickering (1:58.74)	7:59.11	5.69	
6	2	Spain	Tatiana Rouba (2:00.18); Melissa Caballero (2:00.57); Arantxa Ramos (2:02.32); Erika Villaécija (1:59.04)	8:02.11	8.69	
7	1	Brazil	Joanna Melo (2:01.20); Monique Ferreira (2:01.42); Mariana Brochado (2:01.15); Paula Baracho (2:01.52)	8:05.29	11.87	
8	8	Sweden	Josefin Lillhage (1:59.86); Ida Mattsson (2:01.45); Malin Svahnström (2:03.68); Lotta Wanberg (2:03.35)	8:08.34	14.92	
