= Li Ji (swimmer) =

Chinese swimmer (born 1986)

Olympic medal record

Women's swimming

Representing China
Silver medal – second place	2004 Athens	4×200 m freestyle relay

Li Ji (Chinese: 李季, born July 9, 1986, in Yunnan) is a female Chinese freestyle swimmer who competed in the 2004 Summer Olympics.

She won the silver medal as part of the Chinese 4×200 m freestyle relay team. She only competed in the heats, but was also awarded with a silver medal.
