= Andrea Schwartz =

Canadian swimmer (born 1977)

Personal information
- Full name: Andrea Schwartz
- National team: Canada
- Born: June 12, 1977 (age 49) Winnipeg, Manitoba
- Height: 1.68 m (5 ft 6 in)
- Weight: 52 kg (115 lb)

Sport
- Sport: Swimming
- Strokes: Freestyle, butterfly
- Club: Dolphin Swim Club
Medal record
Women's swimming
Representing Canada
Commonwealth Games
Bronze medal – third place	1998 Kuala Lumpur	4x200m freestyle
Pan Pacific Championships
Silver medal – second place	1997 Fukuoka	4x200m freestyle

Andrea Schwartz (born June 12, 1977) is a former international butterfly and freestyle swimmer from Canada, who competed for her native country at the 1996 Summer Olympics in Atlanta, Georgia. There she finished in 15th position in the 200-metre butterfly, and in 20th place in the 400-metre freestyle. With the Canadian relay team, Schwartz reached the final in the 4x200-metre freestyle and ended up in fifth position, alongside Marianne Limpert, Shannon Shakespeare, and Jessica Deglau.
