= Lindsay Benko =

American swimmer (born 1976)

Personal information
- Full name: Lindsay Dianne Benko
- National team: United States
- Born: November 29, 1976 (age 49) Elkhart, Indiana, U.S.
- Height: 6 ft 1 in (1.85 m)
- Weight: 163 lb (74 kg)
- Spouse: Mike Mintenko

Sport
- Sport: Swimming
- Strokes: Freestyle, backstroke
- Club: Trojan Swim Club
- College team: University of Southern California '99 Graduate
- Coach: Mark Schubert, USC Trojans coach, Pikes Peak Athletics
Medal record
Women's swimming
Representing the United States
Olympic Games
Gold medal – first place	2000 Sydney	4×200 m freestyle
Gold medal – first place	2004 Athens	4×200 m freestyle
Silver medal – second place	2004 Athens	4×100 m freestyle
World Championships (LC)
Gold medal – first place	2003 Barcelona	4×100 m freestyle
Gold medal – first place	2003 Barcelona	4×200 m freestyle
Silver medal – second place	1998 Perth	4×200 m freestyle
Silver medal – second place	2003 Barcelona	4×100 m medley
World Championships (SC)
Gold medal – first place	2000 Athens	400 m freestyle
Gold medal – first place	2002 Moscow	200 m freestyle
Gold medal – first place	2002 Moscow	200 m backstroke
Gold medal – first place	2004 Indianapolis	4×100 m freestyle
Gold medal – first place	2004 Indianapolis	4×200 m freestyle
Silver medal – second place	2000 Athens	4×200 m freestyle
Silver medal – second place	2002 Moscow	4×200 m freestyle
Silver medal – second place	2002 Moscow	4×100 m medley
Silver medal – second place	2004 Indianapolis	200 m freestyle
Bronze medal – third place	2000 Athens	200 m backstroke
Pan Pacific Championships
Gold medal – first place	1997 Fukuoka	4×200 m freestyle
Gold medal – first place	1999 Sydney	4×100 m freestyle
Gold medal – first place	1999 Sydney	4×200 m freestyle
Gold medal – first place	2002 Yokohama	200 m freestyle
Gold medal – first place	2002 Yokohama	4×200 m freestyle

Playing and Coaching Career
Playing career
- 1995–1999: USC
- Positions: freestyle, backstroke

Coaching career (HC unless noted)
- 2001–2006: University of Southern California; Assistant Coach
- 2006–2017: USA Swimming; National Team staff
- 2017–2023: USA Swimming’s National Team Division; Managing Director

Accomplishments and honors

Championships
- U.S. swimmers earned 95 medals in 2008, 2012, 2016 Olympics (While on USA Nat. Team Staff)

Lindsay Dianne Benko (born November 29, 1976), known by her married name Lindsay Mintenko since 2005, is an American former competition swimmer, two-time Olympian, former world record-holder, and a managing director of USA Swimming. She represented the United States women as a Team Captain at the 2000 and 2004 Summer Olympics, taking a gold medal in freestyle relays both years. She held the short-course world record in the 400-meter freestyle at 3:59.53, for nearly three years from January 2003 to December 2005.

After taking All-American honors swimming for the University of Southern California, where she led the team to their first NCAA National championship in 1997, she served as their Assistant Coach for five years. She was appointed to USA Swimming's National Team staff in 2006, and in 2017 became the first woman to hold the position of USA National Team Division Managing Director, which included management responsibilities over both the men's and women's U.S. Olympic swim teams.

== Early years and education ==
Benko attended the Stanley Clark School in South Bend, Indiana, for her elementary education. Upon graduating from Stanley Clark, she attended Elkhart Central High School in Elkhart, Indiana, where she lettered in swimming all four years from 1991 through her graduation in 1995. Lindsay made her reputation dominating the 100- and 200-yard freestyle events, taking eight individual state championship titles in her four-year high school career.

Showing promise early, as only a freshman at Elkhart Central in the 13-14 age group, she was ranked first in the country for the 50-meter freestyle with a time of 26.90 and second in the 100-meter freestyle with a time of 57.77 by United States Swimming. Not surprisingly, during her high school swimming career, she was an Indiana State champion in multiple years in the 100-yard freestyle and retained the record from 1993 to 2001. She simultaneously held the state record in the 200 freestyle in multiple years, retaining it for the ten-year period from 1991 to 2011.

At Elkhart, she was "the first swimmer in IHSAA history to sweep two individual events all four years while piling up All-American honors." Swimming for Elkhart Central in Elkhart, she captured the Indiana state title for the 100 free in November 1993, with a time of 50.02. Beginning her senior year in September 1994, Benko held six total state championships, which included a state title as a member of the 4x100 freestyle relay team for Elkhart Central. Lindsay earned All-American honors 10 times at Elkhart Central and received the 1995 Catherine Wolf Award for the outstanding female athlete in the Elkhart Community Schools.

== Swimming career after high school ==
=== Swimming at USC ===
At the University of Southern California from 1995 to 1999, Lindsay was a 21-time All-American swimmer for Hall of Fame Head Coach Mark Schubert. Schubert also served as a U.S. Olympic Coach from 1984 to 2008, during Lindsay's Olympic competition years in 2000 and 2004. During her college years, she won five individual national titles, with three in the 500-yard freestyle and two in the 200-yard backstroke, demonstrating her versatility in a stroke other than freestyle, where she consistently excelled. Many of her titles were in freestyle relays for USC.

=== Leading USC to the 1997 NCAA National Championship ===
More important than her individual accomplishments, in 1997 she was at the center of USC's only NCAA women's swimming and diving championship.

Graduating from USC in 1999, with a Bachelor's in Communications and a Minor in Business, she acquired the academic background that would soon launch her career in both swim coaching and sports management.

== International competition highlights ==
=== 2000, 2004 Olympics ===
At the 2000 Olympics, Benko was a team captain and member of the USA's gold medal-winning 4×200-meter freestyle relay. She had an individual time in her leg of the 4x200 relay of 1:59.34, and the U.S. team's combined time set an Olympic record.

Serving again as the U.S. team captain, four years later at the 2004 Olympics, she earned a second gold medal in the 4×200 m freestyle relay and took a silver in the 4×100-meter freestyle relay.

=== 2000, 2002, 2004 World Short-course Championships ===
Benko excelled in short-course competition, taking a total of 10 medals including 5 golds at the World Short-Course Championships. Her Short-course World Championship golds individually included one in the 400-meter freestyle in 2000 in Athens and a gold in the 200-meter freestyle and 200-meter backstroke in 2002 in Moscow. In 2004, she took a gold in the 200-meter freestyle, in Indianapolis.

==== Short course records ====
Lindsay set American short course records in the 200, 400, and 800-meter freestyle. She also held World short course Records in the 200 and 400-meter freestyle.

=== 1998, 2003, World Aquatics medals ===
In the World Aquatics Championships, in 1998 in Perth, Australia, she won a silver in the 4x200 Medley Freestyle relay. In 2003 Worlds, she won a gold in the 4x100 meter freestyle relay in Barcelona, as well as in the 4x200 meter freestyle relay. She also won a silver in the 4x100 medley relay.

She was the holder of a world record in short-course for the 400-meter free with a time of 3:59.53 from January 2003 to December 2005.

=== 5 Pan Pacific gold medals ===
In 1997, 1999, and 2002, she won four gold medals in the 100 and 200-meter freestyle relays in the Pan Pacifics, and one in the individual 200-meter freestyle.

== Acting career ==
In 2000, Benko played herself in an episode of The Jersey called "Sophomore Year." In the episode, Morgan Hudson (played by Courtnee Draper) fights to have girls soccer reinstated after it is canceled, and Nick Lighter (played by Michael Galeota) uses a news crew to promote girls soccer and to raise money for the school's team with a fundraising car wash.

== Marriage ==
In Indiana, on Saturday, May 7, 2005, Benko married Canadian swimmer Mike Mintenko, a 2000 and 2004 Olympian and a Canadian record holder in the 50-meter butterfly. She uses her married name professionally.

== Coaching and swimming management, 2001–2023 ==
After five years as an USC assistant coach, she was appointed to the staff of USA Swimming's National Team, a position she held from 2006 to 2017.

During her service on the National Team staff, U.S. swimmers received a total of 95 medals spanning the Olympics in 2008, 2012 and 2016 and captured an additional 177 appearances on podiums in swimming competitions in long-course FINA World Championships from around 2012–2017.

== Managing director, U.S. National Team Division, 2017–2024 ==
On October 18, 2017, she was formally promoted and became the first woman to lead USA Swimming's National Team Division as managing director, a position she would until September 20, 2024, which gave her responsibility over both the U.S. Olympic men and women's teams in domestic, world, and Olympic competition. Lindsay was tasked with focusing on athlete and coach development and support for the National Team division.

Likely preparing for a role in swimming management and administration, in 2015, she received her master's degree in Sports Administration from California University of Pennsylvania.

In June 2022, Mintenko, as U.S. American Team Manager announced that Caleb Dressel would be pulled from the World Swimming Championships in Budapest for medical reasons, ending a World Championship career that had garnered two gold medals.

In September 2023, USA Swimming, under the executive management of Mintenko, announced the appointment of Todd DeSorbo as the Head Coach for the U.S. Olympic Women's swim team in the 2024 Paris Olympics, and Anthony Nesty as the Head Coach for the U.S. Olympic Men's Swim team.

On September 6, 2024, Mintenko announced during a press release that she would resign from the managing director position effective September 20, 2024, following the resignation of USA Swimming president and CEO, Tim Hinchey. The resignations followed letters written by both the American Swim Coaches Association, or simply ASCA, and USA Swimming's coaching advisory board, which expressed the organizations' lack of confidence in the leadership of USA Swimming.

Swimming her mother's signature event, Lindsay's daughter Madi Mintenko was a Girl's 200-meter freestyle champion at the 2023 Summer Junior Nationals for age group 15–16 with a time of 1:58.07. Her performance was the seventh fastest age-group time in the history of American competition in the event.

== Honors ==
In 2012, Lindsay was inducted into the University of Southern California Athletic Hall of Fame, and she has also been a member of the Elkhart County Sports Hall of Fame. She is a member of the Indiana High School Athletic Hall of Fame.

She currently resides in Colorado Springs, Colorado, with her husband, Mike, and their two children.

== See also ==
- List of Olympic medalists in swimming (women)
- List of University of Southern California people
- List of World Aquatics Championships medalists in swimming (women)
- World record progression 200 metres freestyle
- World record progression 400 metres freestyle

Records
Preceded by Claudia Poll	Women's 400-meter freestyle world record-holder (short course); January 26, 2003 – December 10, 2005	Succeeded by Laure Manaudou
