= Rebecca Creedy =

Australian swimmer

Personal information
- Full name: Rebecca Creedy
- Nationality: Australia
- Born: 12 March 1983 (age 43) Redcliffe, Queensland, Australia
- Height: 1.70 m (5 ft 7 in)
- Weight: 62 kg (137 lb)

Sport
- Sport: Swimming
- Strokes: Freestyle
- Club: Met Caloundra
Medal record
Women's swimming
Representing Australia
World Championships (LC)
Bronze medal – third place	1998 Perth	4×100 m freestyle
World Championships (SC)
Bronze medal – third place	1999 Hong Kong	4×100 m freestyle
Bronze medal – third place	1999 Hong Kong	4×200 m freestyle
Pan Pacific Championships
Silver medal – second place	1999 Sydney	4×100 m freestyle
Silver medal – second place	1999 Sydney	4×200 m freestyle
Bronze medal – third place	1999 Sydney	100 m freestyle
Commonwealth Games
Gold medal – first place	1998 Kuala Lumpur	4×100 m freestyle
Silver medal – second place	2002 Manchester	4×200 m freestyle
Bronze medal – third place	1998 Kuala Lumpur	100 m freestyle

Rebecca Creedy (born 12 March 1983) is an Australian swimmer who won three bronze medals in freestyle relays at the World Championships in 1998 and 1999. Rebecca Creedy won a gold medal in the women's 4 × 100 m freestyle relay in the Kuala Lumpur Commonwealth Games. Creedy attended Southern Cross Catholic College in Redcliffe, QLD Australia.

She later switched to triathlon and won national ironman tournaments in 2009 and 2012. She has a bachelor's degree in environmental science and lives in Maroochydore. She has twin brothers.

== See also ==
- List of World Aquatics Championships medalists in swimming (women)
- List of Commonwealth Games medallists in swimming (women)
