= Rhi Jeffrey =

American swimmer (born 1986)

Personal information
- Full name: Rhiannon Jeffrey
- Nickname: "Rhi"
- National team: United States
- Born: October 25, 1986 (age 39) Delray Beach, Florida, U.S.
- Height: 6 ft 0 in (1.83 m)
- Weight: 198 lb (90 kg)

Sport
- Sport: Swimming
- Strokes: Freestyle
- Club: Atlantis Aquatics
- College team: University of Southern California
Medal record
Women's swimming
Representing the United States
Olympic Games
Gold medal – first place	2004 Athens	4×200 m freestyle
World Championships (LC)
Gold medal – first place	2003 Barcelona	4×100 m freestyle
Gold medal – first place	2003 Barcelona	4×200 m freestyle
Pan Pacifics
Silver medal – second place	2002 Yokohama	4x100 freestyle

Rhiannon Jeffrey (born October 25, 1986) is an American former swimmer who won a gold medal at the 2004 Summer Olympics.

== Swimming career ==
Jeffrey began swimming at the age of six, and won eight Florida state titles while in high school at Atlantic Community High School in Delray Beach, Florida. She was named state swimmer of the year four years in a row by the South Florida Sun-Sentinel. In 2003, for her senior year at Atlantic, she was joined on the swim team by her younger sister Kirstie.

Jeffrey's first taste of international success was at the 2002 Pan Pacific Swimming Championships where she swam on the U.S. 4x100 freestyle relay team that took a silver medal. While still a senior in high school, she won two gold medals in the 2003 World Aquatics Championships; swimming as part of the U.S. teams in both the 4x100 and 4x200 freestyle relays.

Jeffrey was highly recruited, and chose to go across the country to the University of Southern California in Los Angeles. Just two weeks before the 2004 United States Olympic Trials, Jeffrey was hospitalized with an abscessed tonsil; she recovered in time to take 4th place in the 200 metre freestyle at the competition, and earn a spot on the 4x200 metre relay team in Athens. In Athens she swam in the preliminary heats of the 4x200 freestyle relay, and when the U.S. team won the final, she was awarded a gold medal.

== Justin Wright Controversy ==
While training in New Zealand, Jeffrey, who was 24 at the time, entered into a relationship with a teammate named Justin Wright, who was 17. The story generated significant controversy and media attention. Wright's parents withdrew their consent for him to continue to train, including not paying his dues to Swimming New Zealand. Wright, in what local media members consider to be a legal precedent, won permission from a court to become a member of Swimming New Zealand "against his parents' wishes.", and moved out of their house and in with Jeffrey. Their planned wedding was called off a year later.

== Retirement ==
In 2007, Jeffrey left USC and gave up swimming four months before the U.S. Olympic Trials for the 2008 Summer Olympics. She relocated to Salem, Massachusetts, and took a job with Apple Inc. Jeffrey is currently the head swim coach for the Atlantis Aquatics swim team in Portsmouth, NH. https://www.teamunify.com/TabGeneric.jsp?_tabid_=176697&team=necsc

== See also ==
- List of Olympic medalists in swimming (women)
- List of University of Southern California people
- List of World Aquatics Championships medalists in swimming (women)
