= Renate du Plessis =

South African swimmer

Personal information
- Full name: Renate Magdeleen du Plessis
- National team: South Africa
- Born: 14 July 1981 (age 44) Cape Town, South Africa
- Height: 1.79 m (5 ft 10 in)
- Weight: 76 kg (168 lb)

Sport
- Sport: Swimming
- Strokes: Butterfly
- Club: Bellville Aquarama (R.S.A.)
- College team: University of Hawaii (US); University of Florida (US)
- Coach: Sam Freas (US); Gregg Troy (US); Heinz Dittrich (R.S.A)

Renate Magdeleen du Plessis (born 14 July 1981) is a South African former competitive swimmer who specialised in butterfly events. She broke numerous South African records in the 100-metre butterfly at the 1997 Pan Pacific Swimming Championships in Fukuoka, Japan, and later represented South Africa as an 18-year-old at the 2000 Summer Olympics in Athens, Greece. She received ten All-American honours as a member of the Florida Gators swimming and diving team.

== Career ==
=== Early years ===
Du Plessis was born in Cape Town, South Africa, the daughter of Andre and Jeanette du Plessis. She has one younger sister named Ciska and one younger brother named Marnitz, all of whom were full-time members of the Fellowship of Christian Athletes. She started swimming at the age of ten after watching the 1992 Summer Olympics, where the South African squad made its official comeback in 42 years because of apartheid: "I remember my parents watching and explaining to me what the rings and what the Olympics were". Four years later, she missed a chance to be selected for the Olympic team by almost a small fraction of time. Du Plessis's first competitive swimming experiences were honed with Bellville Aquarama (now Barracudas Aquarama) coach Heinz Dittrich.

At the age of eighteen, Du Plessis left her family in South Africa to come to the United States and eventually swim for the University of Hawaii: ""I had been travelling for swimming since I was 13, so at first it just felt like a really long road trip or camp".

=== College career ===
Du Plessis first attended the University of Hawaii in Honolulu, Hawaii, and competed for the Hawaii Rainbow Wahine swimming and diving team, under head coach Sam Freas, during the 2000–2001 season. She earned four Western Athletic Conference honours and posted a career best in the 100-yard butterfly (54.30).

In the fall of 2001, Du Plessis transferred to the University of Florida in Gainesville, Florida, where she trained for coach Gregg Troy as a member of the Florida Gators swimming and diving team. While swimming for the Gators, she achieved career bests in the 100-yard butterfly (53.02), 200-yard butterfly (1:59.79), and 100-yard backstroke (53.87), and received a total of ten All-American and five Southeastern Conference honours in her entire college career. She graduated from the university in 2004 with a bachelor of science degree major in exercise physiology.

=== International career ===
Du Plessis made her official debut at the 1997 Pan Pacific Swimming Championships in Fukuoka, Japan, where she established a South African record of 1:02.10, but finished fourth in the 100-metre butterfly.

At the 2000 Summer Olympics in Sydney, Australia, Du Plessis competed for South Africa in the women's 100-metre butterfly, along with her teammate Mandy Loots. Missing out of the Olympic Trials, she finished behind Loots from the Mare Nostrum Swim Meet in Rome, Italy with a FINA A-standard time of 1:00.66. She challenged seven other swimmers in heat four, including Hungary's 16-year-old Orsolya Ferenczy and Finland's three-time Olympian Marja Pärssinen. Coming from fourth at the initial turn, she faded down the stretch with fatigue and slow pace to pick up a fifth seed in 1:01.32, more than half a second (0.50) below her entry standard. Du Plessis failed to advance into the semi-finals, as she placed twenty-eighth overall on the first day of prelims.

== See also ==
- Florida Gators
- List of University of Florida alumni
- List of University of Florida Olympians
