= Susie O'Neill =

Australian swimmer (born 1973)

Susie O'Neill AM
Personal information
- Full name: Susan O'Neill
- National team: Australia
- Born: 2 August 1973 (age 53) Mackay, Queensland, Australia
- Height: 1.71 m (5 ft 7 in)
- Weight: 63 kg (139 lb)

Sport
- Sport: Swimming
- Strokes: Butterfly, freestyle
- Club: Commercial Swimming Club
Medal record
Women's swimming
Representing Australia
Event	1st	2nd	3rd
Olympic Games	2	4	2
World Championships (LC)	1	2	4
World Championships (SC)	3	7	1
Pan Pacific Championships	7	15	3
Commonwealth Games	11	5	0
Total	24	33	10
Olympic Games
Gold medal – first place	Atlanta 1996	200 m butterfly
Gold medal – first place	Sydney 2000	200 m freestyle
Silver medal – second place	Atlanta 1996	4×100 m medley
Silver medal – second place	Sydney 2000	200 m butterfly
Silver medal – second place	Sydney 2000	4×100 m medley
Silver medal – second place	Sydney 2000	4×200 m freestyle
Bronze medal – third place	Barcelona 1992	200 m butterfly
Bronze medal – third place	Atlanta 1996	4×200 m freestyle
World Championships (LC)
Gold medal – first place	1998 Perth	200 m butterfly
Silver medal – second place	1991 Perth	4×100 m medley
Silver medal – second place	1998 Perth	4×100 m medley
Bronze medal – third place	1994 Rome	100 m butterfly
Bronze medal – third place	1994 Rome	200 m butterfly
Bronze medal – third place	1998 Perth	4×100 m freestyle
Bronze medal – third place	1998 Perth	4×200 m freestyle
World Championships (SC)
Gold medal – first place	1993 Palma	100 m butterfly
Gold medal – first place	1995 Rio	200 m butterfly
Gold medal – first place	1995 Rio	4×100 m medley
Silver medal – second place	1993 Palma	200 m freestyle
Silver medal – second place	1993 Palma	200 m butterfly
Silver medal – second place	1993 Palma	4×200 m freestyle
Silver medal – second place	1993 Palma	4×100 m medley
Silver medal – second place	1995 Rio	200 m freestyle
Silver medal – second place	1995 Rio	100 m butterfly
Silver medal – second place	1995 Rio	4×100 m freestyle
Bronze medal – third place	1995 Rio	4×100 m medley
Pan Pacific Championships
Gold medal – first place	1991 Edmonton	100 m butterfly
Gold medal – first place	1995 Atlanta	100 m butterfly
Gold medal – first place	1995 Atlanta	200 m butterfly
Gold medal – first place	1995 Atlanta	4×100 m medley
Gold medal – first place	1997 Fukuoka	200 m butterfly
Gold medal – first place	1999 Sydney	200 m freestyle
Gold medal – first place	1999 Sydney	200 m butterfly
Silver medal – second place	1991 Edmonton	4×100 m medley
Silver medal – second place	1993 Kobe	100 m freestyle
Silver medal – second place	1993 Kobe	100 m butterfly
Silver medal – second place	1993 Kobe	4×100 m freestyle
Silver medal – second place	1993 Kobe	4×200 m freestyle
Silver medal – second place	1993 Kobe	4×100 m medley
Silver medal – second place	1995 Atlanta	4×100 m freestyle
Silver medal – second place	1995 Atlanta	4×200 m freestyle
Silver medal – second place	1997 Fukuoka	4×100 m freestyle
Silver medal – second place	1997 Fukuoka	4×200 m freestyle
Silver medal – second place	1997 Fukuoka	4×100 m medley
Silver medal – second place	1999 Sydney	100 m butterfly
Silver medal – second place	1999 Sydney	4×100 m freestyle
Silver medal – second place	1999 Sydney	4×200 m freestyle
Silver medal – second place	1999 Sydney	4×100 m medley
Bronze medal – third place	1991 Edmonton	100 m freestyle
Bronze medal – third place	1991 Edmonton	4×100 m freestyle
Bronze medal – third place	1991 Edmonton	4×200 m freestyle
Commonwealth Games
Gold medal – first place	1990 Auckland	4×100 m freestyle
Gold medal – first place	1994 Victoria	200 m freestyle
Gold medal – first place	1994 Victoria	200 m butterfly
Gold medal – first place	1994 Victoria	4×100 m freestyle
Gold medal – first place	1994 Victoria	4×200 m freestyle
Gold medal – first place	1998 Kuala Lumpur	200 m freestyle
Gold medal – first place	1998 Kuala Lumpur	400 m freestyle
Gold medal – first place	1998 Kuala Lumpur	200 m butterfly
Gold medal – first place	1998 Kuala Lumpur	4×100 m freestyle
Gold medal – first place	1998 Kuala Lumpur	4×200 m freestyle
Gold medal – first place	1998 Kuala Lumpur	4×100 m medley
Silver medal – second place	1990 Auckland	100 m butterfly
Silver medal – second place	1994 Victoria	100 m butterfly
Silver medal – second place	1994 Victoria	4×100 m freestyle
Silver medal – second place	1998 Kuala Lumpur	100 m butterfly
Silver medal – second place	1998 Kuala Lumpur	100 m freestyle

Susan O'Neill, AM (born 2 August 1973) is an Australian former competitive swimmer from Brisbane, Queensland, nicknamed "Madame Butterfly". She achieved eight Olympic Games medals during her swimming career.

== Early life ==
O'Neill was born on 2 August 1973 in Mackay, Queensland, to Trish and John O'Neill. She has two siblings, a brother and a sister. Her family moved to Brisbane and she was educated at Lourdes Hill College (LHC) in Hawthorne. Whilst at LHC, O'Neill excelled in sport, setting school records in 50 m and 100 m butterfly, freestyle, and backstroke. She was also LHC cross country champion and set records for the 13 years 800 m in 1986 and for the 15 years 400 m in 1988 for athletics. All these records still stood as of 2011.

== Swimming career ==
O'Neill won the 200m butterfly at the 1996 Summer Olympics and the 200m freestyle at the 2000 Summer Olympics. She has won 35 Australian titles, 8 Olympic medals including 2 gold, and 24 gold medals in major international competitions. Only Emma McKeon, Ian Thorpe and Leisel Jones have won more Olympic medals for Australia.

At her international debut at the 1990 Commonwealth Games, she won two medals (gold and silver), and continued to add to her medals cache at every international competition until her final Olympics. In front of a home crowd at the 2000 Olympic Games Trials she broke the 19-year standing world record of another "Madame Butterfly", Mary T. Meagher, in the 200m butterfly, but was beaten in an upset at the 2000 Olympic Games by American Misty Hyman.

She trained under Bernie Wakefield until 1994, then Scott Volkers at the Commercial Swimming Club in Brisbane.

== Post swimming career ==
O'Neill is an ambassador for the Fred Hollows Foundation.

She provided commentary at the 2006 Commonwealth Games in Melbourne for the Australian Broadcasting Corporation. She was the Oceania athletes' representative on the International Olympic Committee from 2000 to 2005. When she resigned her membership she was replaced by Barbara Kendall.

On 10 March 2007 during the 12th FINA World Championship, O'Neill was honoured by the dedication of the temporary swimming pool in the Rod Laver Arena in Melbourne named after her for the duration of the competition.

In 2015, O'Neill made regular appearances on Ash, Kip & Luttsy for several years before officially joining the team in 2019, at which point the show was renamed Ash, Luttsy & Susie. She continued as a co-host until November 2024. In 2026 she returned to the show.

In May 2019, O'Neill was announced as Australia's joint Deputy Chef de Mission for the 2021 Olympic Games in Tokyo, with fellow Olympians, Evelyn Halls and Kim Brennan.

== Honours and awards ==
- 1996 – awarded the World Trophy for Australasia.
- 1996 – joint winner with Jackie Gallagher of the Australian Sport Awards Female Athlete of the Year
- 1997 – Australian Day Honours, O'Neill was awarded the Order of Australia Medal (OAM) "for service to sport as a gold medallist at the Atlanta Olympic Games, 1996."
- 1998 – awarded the Australian Sport Awards Female Athlete of the Year
- 1998 – was named Favourite Female Sports Star at the 1998 and the 1999 Australian People's Choice Awards.
- 14 July 2000 – awarded the Australian Sports Medal for "her significant contribution as a competitor in swimming".
- 2000 – the State Transit Authority named a SuperCat ferry after O'Neill.
- 2000 – At the 2000 Sydney Olympics, she was elected to the International Olympic Committee Athletes' Commission by competitors at the 2000 Games, but family obligations caused her to resign in 2005.
- 1 January 2001 – awarded the Centenary Medal "For service to the community through health".
- 5 December 2002 – inducted into Sport Australia Hall of Fame.
- 2009 – inducted into the Queensland Sport Hall of Fame.
- 10 June 2009 – as part of the Q150 celebrations, O'Neill was announced as one of the Q150 Icons of Queensland for her role as a "sports legend".
- 2012 – elevated to become Sport Australia Hall of Fame's 34th Legend of Australian Sport.
- 2018 – appointed Member of the Order of Australia (AM) in Australia Day Honours "For significant service to swimming at the elite level, as a mentor and role model, and to the community through support for charitable organisations."
- 2023 – Inducted into Swimming Australia Hall of Fame.

== Personal life ==
O'Neill married Cliff Fairley, who works as an ophthalmologist, in 1998. They have two children.

== Philanthropy ==
O'Neill and her husband, Cliff Fairley, are ambassadors for the Fred Hollows Foundation. The Fred Hollows Foundation is an international nonprofit organisation that educates surgeons on how to cure avoidable blindness within underserved communities and countries.

== See also ==
- List of members of the International Swimming Hall of Fame
- List of Olympic medalists in swimming (women)
- List of multiple Summer Olympic medalists
- List of World Aquatics Championships medalists in swimming (women)
- List of Commonwealth Games medallists in swimming (women)
- World record progression 200 metres butterfly

Records
Preceded by Mary T. Meagher	Women's 200 metre butterfly world record holder (long course); 17 May 2000 – 4 August 2002	Succeeded by Otylia Jędrzejczak
Preceded by Incumbent	Women's 200 metre butterfly world record holder (short course); 17 February 1999 – 18 January 2004	Succeeded by Yang Yu
Awards
Preceded by Incumbent	Swimming World; World Pacific Rim Swimmer of the Year; 1995	Succeeded by Le Jingyi
Preceded by Samantha Riley	Swimming World; Pacific Rim Swimmer of the Year; 1998–2000	Succeeded by Petria Thomas
