= Sung Yi-chieh =

Taiwanese swimmer

Personal information
- Full name: Sung Yi-chieh
- National team: Chinese Taipei
- Born: 3 February 1986 (age 40) Taipei, Taiwan
- Height: 1.64 m (5 ft 5 in)
- Weight: 57 kg (126 lb)

Sport
- Sport: Swimming
- Strokes: Freestyle

Sung Yi-chieh (Chinese: 宋 怡潔; pinyin: Sòng Yíjié; born February 3, 1986) is a Taiwanese former swimmer, who specialized in sprint freestyle events. Sung qualified for the women's 100 m freestyle at the 2004 Summer Olympics, by clearing a FINA B-standard entry time of 58.08 from the National University Games in Taipei. She challenged seven other swimmers on the second heat, including three-time Olympian Agnese Ozoliņa of Latvia. She raced to fifth place by 0.15 of a second behind Ozolina in 59.85. Sung failed to advance into the semifinals, as she placed forty-fourth overall in the preliminaries.
