= Sarah Evanetz =

Canadian swimmer (born 1975)

Personal information
- Full name: Sarah Evanetz
- National team: Canada
- Born: June 27, 1975 (age 51) Vancouver, British Columbia, Canada
- Height: 1.67 m (5 ft 6 in)
- Weight: 60 kg (132 lb)
- Relatives: Siku Adams (Husband); Ella Adams (Daughter); Benjamin Adams (Son); Charlotte Adams (Daughter)

Sport
- Sport: Swimming
- Strokes: Butterfly, freestyle
- Club: Pacific Dolphins
- College team: University of British Columbia
Medal record
Women's swimming
Representing Canada
World Championships (SC)
Gold medal – first place	1995 Rio de Janeiro	4×200 m freestyle
Pan American Games
Gold medal – first place	1999 Winnipeg	4x100 m freestyle

Sarah Evanetz (born June 27, 1975) is a former competition swimmer from Canada, who competed for her native country at the 1996 Summer Olympics in Atlanta, Georgia. There she finished in 15th in the 100-metre butterfly, and in fifth place with the Canadian relay team in the 4×100-metre medley relay, alongside Julie Howard, Guylaine Cloutier and Shannon Shakespeare.
