= Jessica Deglau =

Canadian swimmer (born 1980)

Personal information
- Full name: Jessica Deglau
- National team: Canada
- Born: May 27, 1980 (age 46) Vancouver, British Columbia, Canada
- Height: 1.72 m (5 ft 8 in)
- Weight: 57 kg (126 lb)

Sport
- Sport: Swimming
- Strokes: Butterfly, freestyle
- Club: Pacific Dolphins
- College team: University of British Columbia
Medal record
Women's swimming
Representing Canada
Pan Pacific Championships
Silver medal – second place	1997 Fukuoka	4x200m freestyle
Silver medal – second place	1999 Sydney	200m butterfly
Bronze medal – third place	1999 Sydney	4x100m freestyle
Bronze medal – third place	1999 Sydney	4x200m freestyle
Commonwealth Games
Bronze medal – third place	1998 Kuala Lumpur	200m freestyle
Bronze medal – third place	1998 Kuala Lumpur	200m butterfly
Bronze medal – third place	1998 Kuala Lumpur	4x100m freestyle
Bronze medal – third place	1998 Kuala Lumpur	4x200m freestyle
Bronze medal – third place	2002 Manchester	4x100m freestyle
Pan American Games
Gold medal – first place	1999 Winnipeg	200m freestyle
Gold medal – first place	1999 Winnipeg	200m butterfly
Gold medal – first place	1999 Winnipeg	4x100m freestyle
Gold medal – first place	1999 Winnipeg	4x200m freestyle
Silver medal – second place	1999 Winnipeg	4x100 m medley

Jessica Deglau (born May 27, 1980) was a member of the Canadian Olympic team in swimming in the 1996 and 2000 Olympic Games. Deglau swam for the Vancouver Pacific Swim Club in her youth, until becoming a member of the national team. In addition to swimming on the national team, she swam for and graduated from the University of British Columbia.

The Vancouver native first broke the Canadian record in the 200-meter butterfly at the 1996 Olympics clocking 2:11.68 for sixth spot and bettered it two years later at the world championships, again finishing sixth.

However, in the 200-metre butterfly at the 1999 Pan American Games, Deglau went under the magic 2:10 barrier clocking 2:09.64, a time that would have earned her the silver medal at the 1996 Games and a bronze at the 1998 worlds. It was the second fastest time in the world in 1999 behind Australian world and Olympic champion Susie O'Neill's 2:07.35.

Deglau won the 1996 Elaine Tanner Award, presented annually to Canada's outstanding junior female athlete. She also won a 2003 Sport BC Athlete of the Year Award and a 2003 Premier's Athletic Award for swimming as an outstanding British Columbia athlete, and was honored as "one of the greatest swimmers in Canadian Interuniversity Sport CIS history." During her collegiate swimming career she amassed a total of 29 medals, the highest total in the history of UBC. Deglau was chosen CIS Female Swimmer of the Year in 1998-99 and 1999–2000. On April 3, 2013, Deglau was inducted into the UBC Sports Hall of Fame.

Jessica Deglau is a distant relative of prominent photographer Terry Deglau.

== See also ==
- List of Commonwealth Games medallists in swimming (women)
