= Bodybuilding at the Asian Games =

- Governing bodies: IFBB (World) / AFBF (Asia)
- Events: 8 (men)

Games
- 1951; 1954; 1958; 1962; 1966; 1970; 1974; 1978; 1982; 1986; 1990; 1994; 1998; 2002; 2006; 2010; 2014; 2018; 2022; 2026
- Medalists

Bodybuilding was an Asian Games event from 2002 to 2006. Bodybuilding is no longer an event at the Games because of the judging controversy during the 2006 Asian Games.

== Events ==
Event	02	06	Years
Men's 60 kg	X	X	2
Men's 65 kg	X	X	2
Men's 70 kg	X	X	2
Men's 75 kg	X	X	2
Men's 80 kg	X	X	2
Men's 85 kg	X	X	2
Men's 90 kg	X	X	2
Men's +90 kg	X	X	2
Total	8	8	

== Medal table ==
Rank	Nation	Gold	Silver	Bronze	Total
1	Singapore (SGP)	3	2	3	8
2	South Korea (KOR)	3	0	4	7
3	Bahrain (BRN)	2	3	1	6
4	Qatar (QAT)	2	1	1	4
5	Hong Kong (HKG)	1	1	1	3
5	Vietnam (VIE)	1	1	1	3
7	China (CHN)	1	0	0	1
7	Lebanon (LBN)	1	0	0	1
7	Thailand (THA)	1	0	0	1
7	United Arab Emirates (UAE)	1	0	0	1
11	Japan (JPN)	0	3	2	5
12	Indonesia (INA)	0	2	0	2
12	Malaysia (MAS)	0	2	0	2
14	Syria (SYR)	0	1	0	1
15	Jordan (JOR)	0	0	1	1
15	Macau (MAC)	0	0	1	1
15	Myanmar (MYA)	0	0	1	1
Totals (17 entries)		16	16	16	48

== Participating nations ==
Nation	02	06	Years
Afghanistan		4	1
Bahrain	6	8	2
China	5	4	2
Chinese Taipei	2	2	2
Hong Kong	3	4	2
India	2		1
Indonesia	3	2	2
Iran		8	1
Iraq		5	1
Japan	8	4	2
Jordan		1	1
Kazakhstan	5	2	2
Lebanon	2	1	2
Macau		4	1
Malaysia	2	2	2
Maldives	1	3	2
Myanmar	4		1
Nepal		1	1
Oman		4	1
Pakistan	2		1
Philippines	2	2	2
Qatar	4	7	2
Singapore	8	6	2
South Korea	8	7	2
Syria		2	1
Thailand	1	3	2
United Arab Emirates	6	4	2
Vietnam	5	4	2
Number of nations	20	25	
Number of athletes	79	94	
