= Bodybuilding at the 2002 Asian Games =

- Venue: Busan Citizens' Hall
- Dates: 3–6 October 2002
- Competitors: 79 from 20 nations

Bodybuilding was one of the many sports which was held at the 2002 Asian Games in Busan, South Korea between 3 and 6 October 2002. The competition took place at Busan Citizens' Hall. The competition included only men's events for eight different weight categories. The host national South Korea topped the medal table by winning three gold medals higher than Singapore and Bahrain.

== Schedule ==
P	Preliminary	F	Final

Event↓/Date →	3rd Thu	4th Fri	5th Sat	6th Sun
Men's 60 kg	P		F	
Men's 65 kg		P		F
Men's 70 kg	P		F	
Men's 75 kg		P		F
Men's 80 kg	P		F	
Men's 85 kg		P		F
Men's 90 kg	P		F	
Men's +90 kg		P		F

== Medalists ==
Event	Gold	Silver	Bronze
60 kg	Cho Wang-bung; South Korea	Ibrahim Sihat; Singapore	Phạm Văn Mách; Vietnam
65 kg	Abdul Halim Haron; Singapore	Lee Lap Chi; Hong Kong	Amir Zainal; Singapore
70 kg	Han Dong-ki; South Korea	Toshihiko Hirota; Japan	Koji Godo; Japan
75 kg	Simon Chua; Singapore	Yoshihiro Yano; Japan	Min Zaw Oo; Myanmar
80 kg	Lý Đức; Vietnam	Liaw Teck Leong; Malaysia	Lee Jin-ho; South Korea
85 kg	Kang Kyung-won; South Korea	Sami Al-Haddad; Bahrain	Mohamed Sabah; Bahrain
90 kg	Tareq Al-Farsani; Bahrain	Mohd Ismail Muhammad; Singapore	Ahmad Al-Saafeen; Qatar
+90 kg	Mohammad Anouti; Lebanon	Wimpi Wungow; Indonesia	Choi Jae-duck; South Korea

== Medal table ==
Rank	Nation	Gold	Silver	Bronze	Total
1	South Korea (KOR)	3	0	2	5
2	Singapore (SIN)	2	2	1	5
3	Bahrain (BRN)	1	1	1	3
4	Vietnam (VIE)	1	0	1	2
5	Lebanon (LIB)	1	0	0	1
6	Japan (JPN)	0	2	1	3
7	Hong Kong (HKG)	0	1	0	1
7	Indonesia (INA)	0	1	0	1
7	Malaysia (MAS)	0	1	0	1
10	Myanmar (MYA)	0	0	1	1
10	Qatar (QAT)	0	0	1	1
Totals (11 entries)		8	8	8	24

== Participating nations ==
A total of 79 athletes from 20 nations competed in bodybuilding at the 2002 Asian Games:

- Bahrain (6)
- China (5)
- Chinese Taipei (2)
- Hong Kong (3)
- India (2)
- Indonesia (3)
- Japan (8)
- Kazakhstan (5)
- Lebanon (2)
- Malaysia (2)
- Maldives (1)
- Myanmar (4)
- Pakistan (2)
- Philippines (2)
- Qatar (4)
- Singapore (8)
- South Korea (8)
- Thailand (1)
- United Arab Emirates (6)
- Vietnam (5)
