= List of Asian Games medalists in bodybuilding =

This is the complete list of Asian Games medalists in bodybuilding from 2002 to 2006.

== Men ==
=== Flyweight ===
- 60 kg: 2002–2006

Games	Gold	Silver	Bronze
2002 Busan	Cho Wang-bong (KOR)	Ibrahim Sihat (SIN)	Phạm Văn Mách (VIE)
2006 Doha	Qian Jicheng (CHN)	Phạm Văn Mách (VIE)	Ibrahim Sihat (SIN)

=== Bantamweight ===
- 65 kg: 2002–2006

Games	Gold	Silver	Bronze
2002 Busan	Abdul Halim Haron (SIN)	Lee Lap Chi (HKG)	Amir Zainal (SIN)
2006 Doha	Mohammed Salem Al-Zahmi (UAE)	Sazali Abdul Samad (MAS)	Chong Ka Lap (MAC)

=== Lightweight ===
- 70 kg: 2002–2006

Games	Gold	Silver	Bronze
2002 Busan	Han Dong-ki (KOR)	Toshihiko Hirota (JPN)	Koji Godo (JPN)
2006 Doha	Simon Chua (SIN)	Syafrizaldy (INA)	Kenji Kondo (JPN)

=== Welterweight ===
- 75 kg: 2002–2006

Games	Gold	Silver	Bronze
2002 Busan	Simon Chua (SIN)	Yoshihiro Yano (JPN)	Min Zaw Oo (MYA)
2006 Doha	Chan Yun To (HKG)	Yoshihiro Yano (JPN)	Mohd Ismail Muhammad (SIN)

=== Light middleweight ===
- 80 kg: 2002–2006

Games	Gold	Silver	Bronze
2002 Busan	Lý Đức (VIE)	Liaw Teck Leong (MAS)	Lee Jin-ho (KOR)
2006 Doha	Sitthi Charoenrith (THA)	Mohamed Sabah (BRN)	Lee Do-hee (KOR)

=== Middleweight ===
- 85 kg: 2002–2006

Games	Gold	Silver	Bronze
2002 Busan	Kang Kyung-won (KOR)	Sami Al-Haddad (BRN)	Mohamed Sabah (BRN)
2006 Doha	Kamal El-Gargni (QAT)	Fadhel Moussa (BRN)	Kang Kyung-won (KOR)

=== Light heavyweight ===
- 90 kg: 2002–2006

Games	Gold	Silver	Bronze
2002 Busan	Tareq Al-Farsani (BRN)	Mohd Ismail Muhammad (SIN)	Ahmad Al-Saafeen (QAT)
2006 Doha	Ali Tabrizi (QAT)	Hassan Al-Saka (SYR)	Lam Man Shing (HKG)

=== Heavyweight ===
- +90 kg: 2002–2006

Games	Gold	Silver	Bronze
2002 Busan	Mohammad Anouti (LIB)	Wimpi Wungow (INA)	Choi Jae-duck (KOR)
2006 Doha	Tareq Al-Farsani (BRN)	Jassim Abdulla (QAT)	Ahmad Al-Saafeen (JOR)
