= Bowling at the 2002 Asian Games – Men's singles =

Men's singles at the 2002 Asian Games
- Venue: Homeplus Asiad Bowling Alley
- Date: 3 October 2002
- Competitors: 100 from 18 nations

Medalists
gold medal	Remy Ong	Singapore
silver medal	Yannaphon Larpapharat	Thailand
bronze medal	Shaker Ali Al-Hassan	United Arab Emirates

The men's singles competition at the 2002 Asian Games in Busan was held on 3 October 2002 at the Homeplus Asiad Bowling Alley.

== Schedule ==
All times are Korea Standard Time (UTC+09:00)

Date	Time	Event
Thursday, 3 October 2002	09:00	Squad A
Thursday, 3 October 2002	18:00	Squad B

== Results ==
Rank	Athlete	Game						Total
Rank	Athlete	1	2	3	4	5	6	Total
1st place, gold medalist(s)	Remy Ong (SIN)	226	212	227	265	243	216	1389
2nd place, silver medalist(s)	Yannaphon Larpapharat (THA)	213	205	269	235	258	192	1372
2nd place, silver medalist(s)	Shaker Ali Al-Hassan (UAE)	186	205	265	268	213	235	1372
4	Biboy Rivera (PHI)	258	213	228	226	238	204	1367
5	Eric Lau (HKG)	191	264	222	198	258	231	1364
6	Hulaiman Al-Hameli (UAE)	211	212	255	214	245	226	1363
7	Ahmed Shahin Al-Merikhi (QAT)	231	202	224	215	234	247	1353
8	Paeng Nepomuceno (PHI)	226	220	178	203	257	268	1352
9	Kim Kyung-min (KOR)	209	247	225	172	258	236	1347
10	Chester King (PHI)	246	215	249	188	233	212	1343
11	R. J. Bautista (PHI)	217	244	225	191	237	227	1341
12	Isao Yamamoto (JPN)	225	192	235	204	243	239	1338
13	Daniel Lim (MAS)	247	182	245	224	235	204	1337
14	Saeed Al-Hajri (QAT)	235	177	235	245	245	194	1331
15	Chung Him (HKG)	224	221	219	244	204	211	1323
16	Liu Shaoyi (CHN)	191	212	248	201	236	231	1319
16	Tsai Chun-lin (TPE)	228	195	200	244	237	215	1319
18	Lee Yu Wen (SIN)	261	205	175	212	226	234	1313
19	Li Zhibin (CHN)	227	265	178	211	216	215	1312
20	Terdporn Manophaiboon (THA)	224	209	279	184	221	192	1309
21	Mohammed Al-Najrani (KSA)	223	211	170	193	264	247	1308
22	Masaru Ito (JPN)	220	241	209	174	253	209	1306
23	Kim Myung-jo (KOR)	212	245	205	217	225	199	1303
24	Jo Nam-yi (KOR)	161	168	186	249	258	278	1300
24	Talal Al-Towireb (KSA)	245	256	155	182	224	238	1300
26	Basel Al-Anzi (KUW)	222	177	249	208	251	191	1298
27	Kim Jae-hoon (KOR)	238	233	192	218	189	227	1297
27	Mubarak Al-Merikhi (QAT)	257	211	217	216	189	207	1297
29	Alvin Kwang (SIN)	214	185	235	178	247	236	1295
30	Hirofumi Morimoto (JPN)	255	195	212	214	258	159	1293
31	Wu Siu Hong (HKG)	220	179	221	211	204	257	1292
32	Sun Huaqiang (CHN)	173	202	202	239	235	238	1289
33	Masahiro Hibi (JPN)	199	193	231	197	214	247	1281
33	Shigeo Saito (JPN)	176	206	224	229	245	201	1281
35	Kao Hai-yuan (TPE)	202	206	224	204	232	212	1280
36	Hsieh Yu-ping (TPE)	184	221	205	214	225	225	1274
37	Byun Ho-jin (KOR)	208	191	247	190	233	203	1272
38	Yusuf Mohamed Falah (BRN)	182	181	248	223	224	211	1269
39	Sultan Al-Marzouqi (UAE)	203	206	191	214	243	211	1268
39	Abidah Al-Bargi (KSA)	215	232	201	195	182	243	1268
41	Shaik Abdul Hameed (IND)	207	176	244	232	237	170	1266
42	Seo Kook (KOR)	201	154	191	258	226	213	1243
43	Zhang Ye (CHN)	202	214	169	204	206	247	1242
44	Leonardo Rey (PHI)	231	203	187	197	194	226	1238
45	Bunsong Numthuam (THA)	180	177	192	245	222	209	1225
45	Nayef Eqab (UAE)	236	198	167	234	207	183	1225
47	Choi Io Fai (MAC)	195	206	254	184	181	204	1224
48	Azidi Ameran (MAS)	206	237	222	194	192	171	1222
48	Jiang Yong (CHN)	188	202	208	202	217	205	1222
50	Sha Mingjian (CHN)	192	199	202	177	238	212	1220
50	Seiji Watanabe (JPN)	238	186	189	244	211	152	1220
52	Fadhel Al-Mousawi (KUW)	223	201	192	185	226	192	1219
53	Jose Manuel Machon (MAC)	179	195	247	160	202	231	1214
54	Meshal Handi (KSA)	152	223	237	186	182	232	1212
54	Gerald Samuel (MAS)	187	181	236	245	204	159	1212
56	Tsai Te-ko (TPE)	182	166	217	237	195	213	1210
57	Hui Cheung Kwok (HKG)	202	214	177	214	201	200	1208
57	Christian Jan Suarez (PHI)	179	212	233	193	190	201	1208
59	Pachon Nilta (THA)	230	213	205	179	192	185	1204
60	Sam Goh (SIN)	255	205	188	177	159	210	1194
61	Tammam Sharif (KSA)	187	183	218	227	180	195	1190
62	Mohammed Al-Qubaisi (UAE)	217	180	160	185	213	234	1189
62	Bassam Ghonaim (KSA)	184	244	196	189	194	182	1189
62	Andre Souza (MAC)	193	224	183	192	173	224	1189
65	Osama Khalfan (BRN)	218	228	181	149	222	181	1179
66	Chawasit Phasukthaworn (THA)	205	198	187	173	197	218	1178
67	Khalifa Al-Kubaisi (QAT)	223	190	195	224	156	189	1177
68	Ben Heng (MAS)	193	206	196	222	168	191	1176
68	Rocky Hui (HKG)	182	179	213	226	203	173	1176
70	Alex Liew (MAS)	160	211	216	180	190	211	1168
71	Khalifa Al-Khalifa (QAT)	222	179	187	194	214	169	1165
72	Chen Chih-wen (TPE)	240	204	139	193	182	205	1163
73	Yaqeb Al-Shatei (KUW)	176	232	198	181	216	159	1162
74	Choi Iao Man (MAC)	184	182	164	212	204	205	1151
75	Sou Wai Chon (MAC)	189	186	194	223	189	168	1149
76	Ahmed Al-Awadhi (BRN)	172	195	204	171	202	202	1146
77	Saleh Al-Jahjouh (KUW)	160	176	178	213	201	216	1144
78	Dominic Lim (SIN)	181	221	195	167	184	195	1143
79	Norman Law (HKG)	199	175	146	247	179	192	1138
80	Kairat Baibolatov (KAZ)	160	199	223	179	190	184	1135
81	Nader Nazar (KUW)	210	178	170	170	179	210	1117
82	Carl de Vries (SIN)	185	179	190	175	191	195	1115
83	Tsai Ting-yun (TPE)	170	211	202	181	173	177	1114
84	Abdrakhman Abinayev (KAZ)	179	184	192	198	169	182	1104
85	Abdulla Al-Qattan (QAT)	182	187	198	164	190	182	1103
86	Galymzhan Tashimov (KAZ)	166	192	226	177	171	168	1100
87	Miyegombyn Tüvshinsanaa (MGL)	200	153	165	212	181	188	1099
87	Zulmazran Zulkifli (MAS)	175	180	189	166	206	183	1099
89	Adilbishiin Baatarbold (MGL)	179	175	142	203	171	215	1085
90	Khalid Al-Khaja (BRN)	175	187	169	168	195	178	1072
91	Sayed Ibrahim Al-Hashemi (UAE)	208	174	199	158	172	152	1063
92	Mahdi Asadalla (BRN)	194	173	149	170	188	184	1058
93	Marat Turlykhanov (KAZ)	198	144	169	195	169	167	1042
94	Dulat Turlykhanov (KAZ)	139	157	191	186	185	182	1040
95	Tariq Al-Hajeri (KUW)	164	178	174	181	169	160	1026
96	Ayoob Hassan (BRN)	142	188	224	159	131	149	993
97	Tsend-Ochiryn Bolor-Erdene (MGL)	186	157	133	183	135	148	942
98	Gendenjamtsyn Badamsambuu (MGL)	158	147	164	148	175	145	937
99	Tulgyn Altangerel (MGL)	138	176	155	138	167	149	923
100	Galbadrakhyn Sunduijav (MGL)	112	136	150	171	178	171	918
