= Wushu at the 2002 Asian Games – Men's changquan combined =

Men's changquan combined at the 2002 Asian Games
- Venue: Minseok Sports Center
- Dates: 10–13 October 2002
- Competitors: 18 from 14 nations

Medalists
gold medal	Yuan Xindong	China
silver medal	Dennis To	Hong Kong
bronze medal	Arvin Ting	Philippines

The men's changquan three events combined competition (Changquan, Daoshu and Gunshu) at the 2002 Asian Games in Busan, South Korea was held from 10 to 13 October at the Dongseo University Minseok Sports Center.

== Schedule ==
All times are Korea Standard Time (UTC+09:00)

Date	Time	Event
Thursday, 10 October 2002	12:00	Changquan
Friday, 11 October 2002	11:30	Daoshu
Sunday, 13 October 2002	12:30	Gunshu

== Results ==
Legend

- DNS — Did not start

Rank	Athlete	Changquan	Daoshu	Gunshu	Total
1st place, gold medalist(s)	Yuan Xindong (CHN)	9.46	9.46	9.48	28.40
2nd place, silver medalist(s)	Dennis To (HKG)	9.35	9.36	9.40	28.11
3rd place, bronze medalist(s)	Arvin Ting (PHI)	9.30	9.31	9.31	27.92
4	Kweon Heung-seok (KOR)	9.23	9.30	9.36	27.89
5	Pyi Wai Phyo (MYA)	9.28	9.26	9.33	27.87
6	Ng Wa Loi (MAC)	9.18	9.28	9.31	27.77
7	Oh Poh Soon (MAS)	9.16	9.25	9.28	27.69
8	Ryoji Sakuma (JPN)	9.16	9.18	9.28	27.62
9	Fui Yonemoto (JPN)	9.29	9.30	9.01	27.60
10	Mark Robert Rosales (PHI)	9.20	9.30	9.05	27.55
11	Arash Azizi (IRI)	9.15	9.13	9.21	27.49
12	Lim Kim (MAS)	9.21	8.95	9.26	27.42
13	Wong Hang Cheong (MAC)	9.15	9.16	9.00	27.31
14	Leo Wen Yeow (SIN)	9.05	9.23	9.01	27.29
15	Seno Prakoso (INA)	8.91	8.90	9.18	26.99
16	Esam Al-Haimi (YEM)	8.96	9.05	8.81	26.82
17	Usaman Ahmed (PAK)	8.31	8.50	8.26	25.07
18	Zolyn Ikh-Uul (MGL)	DNS	DNS	DNS	0.00
