= Bowling at the 2002 Asian Games – Men's trios =

Men's trios at the 2002 Asian Games
- Venue: Homeplus Asiad Bowling Alley
- Date: 5–6 October 2002
- Competitors: 93 from 17 nations

Medalists
gold medal	Singapore; Sam Goh, Lee Yu Wen, Remy Ong
silver medal	Philippines; Christian Jan Suarez, Chester King, Leonardo Rey
silver medal	United Arab Emirates; Mohammed Al-Qubaisi, Shaker Ali Al-Hassan, Hulaiman Al-Hameli

The men's trios competition at the 2002 Asian Games in Busan was held on 5 and 6 October 2002 at the Homeplus Asiad Bowling Alley.

== Schedule ==
All times are Korea Standard Time (UTC+09:00)

Date	Time	Event
Saturday, 5 October 2002	09:00	First block
Sunday, 6 October 2002	13:10	Second block

== Results ==
Rank	Team	Game						Total
Rank	Team	1	2	3	4	5	6	Total
1st place, gold medalist(s)	Singapore 1 (SIN)	596	621	647	696	695	706	3961
	Sam Goh	191	204	198	245	204	237	1279
	Lee Yu Wen	221	218	187	249	267	204	1346
	Remy Ong	184	199	262	202	224	265	1336
2nd place, silver medalist(s)	Philippines 2 (PHI)	658	614	649	601	661	691	3874
	Christian Jan Suarez	248	193	223	160	174	253	1251
	Chester King	189	233	201	229	238	215	1305
	Leonardo Rey	221	188	225	212	249	223	1318
2nd place, silver medalist(s)	United Arab Emirates 1 (UAE)	644	633	605	700	630	662	3874
	Mohammed Al-Qubaisi	183	193	191	218	237	215	1237
	Shaker Ali Al-Hassan	258	192	244	289	182	202	1367
	Hulaiman Al-Hameli	203	248	170	193	211	245	1270
4	South Korea 2 (KOR)	658	603	699	615	660	596	3831
	Seo Kook	221	204	237	201	219	192	1274
	Byun Ho-jin	226	206	226	218	210	246	1332
	Kim Jae-hoon	211	193	236	196	231	158	1225
5	Chinese Taipei 1 (TPE)	627	647	634	611	644	667	3830
	Kao Hai-yuan	204	220	214	192	216	232	1278
	Tsai Ting-yun	257	214	225	174	200	222	1292
	Hsieh Yu-ping	166	213	195	245	228	213	1260
6	Qatar 1 (QAT)	678	626	673	537	609	624	3747
	Mubarak Al-Merikhi	211	236	204	190	187	217	1245
	Saeed Al-Hajri	243	186	243	148	212	222	1254
	Ahmed Shahin Al-Merikhi	243	186	243	148	212	222	1254
7	Kuwait 1 (KUW)	595	618	625	636	679	590	3743
	Saleh Al-Jahjouh	191	185	185	237	243	204	1245
	Fadhel Al-Mousawi	190	234	222	213	212	187	1258
	Basel Al-Anzi	214	199	218	186	224	199	1240
8	Japan 2 (JPN)	565	614	686	687	583	583	3718
	Shigeo Saito	183	203	236	260	179	183	1244
	Masahiro Hibi	181	218	236	191	207	211	1244
	Hirofumi Morimoto	201	193	214	236	197	189	1230
9	China 1 (CHN)	612	615	630	598	614	630	3699
	Li Zhibin	193	190	214	192	230	221	1240
	Liu Shaoyi	204	228	204	211	203	174	1224
	Sun Huaqiang	215	197	212	195	181	235	1235
10	Malaysia 1 (MAS)	627	619	601	553	627	665	3692
	Azidi Ameran	200	196	193	181	224	204	1198
	Daniel Lim	247	236	178	171	162	195	1189
	Ben Heng	180	187	230	201	241	266	1305
11	United Arab Emirates 2 (UAE)	621	577	655	566	593	663	3675
	Nayef Eqab	215	206	210	199	211	181	1222
	Sultan Al-Marzouqi	192	189	226	166	194	214	1181
	Sayed Ibrahim Al-Hashemi	214	182	219	201	188	268	1272
12	Thailand 1 (THA)	527	603	638	593	651	656	3668
	Yannaphon Larpapharat	202	189	242	201	201	203	1238
	Chawasit Phasukthaworn	158	218	197	210	236	236	1255
	Pachon Nilta	167	196	199	182	214	217	1175
13	Malaysia 2 (MAS)	659	524	682	616	626	556	3663
	Zulmazran Zulkifli	196	160	237	221	235	192	1241
	Alex Liew	252	195	229	234	198	186	1294
	Gerald Samuel	211	169	216	161	193	178	1128
14	Japan 1 (JPN)	538	657	571	635	597	660	3658
	Masaru Ito	156	198	159	213	191	256	1173
	Isao Yamamoto	192	237	222	200	218	208	1277
	Seiji Watanabe	190	222	190	222	188	196	1208
15	Kuwait 2 (KUW)	640	585	618	536	589	634	3602
	Nader Nazar	220	204	201	178	201	159	1163
	Yaqeb Al-Shatei	236	211	245	156	195	285	1328
	Tariq Al-Hajeri	184	170	172	202	193	190	1111
16	Saudi Arabia 1 (KSA)	523	659	653	597	621	538	3591
	Talal Al-Towireb	170	185	258	220	203	171	1207
	Mohammed Al-Najrani	201	256	171	165	218	200	1211
	Tammam Sharif	152	218	224	212	200	167	1173
17	Philippines 1 (PHI)	583	550	585	594	661	608	3581
	Biboy Rivera	234	193	180	210	249	180	1246
	Paeng Nepomuceno	176	176	209	181	199	194	1135
	R. J. Bautista	173	181	196	203	213	234	1200
18	Qatar 2 (QAT)	584	616	668	586	550	576	3580
	Khalifa Al-Khalifa	213	203	217	206	219	179	1237
	Abdulla Al-Qattan	182	192	237	225	182	205	1223
	Khalifa Al-Kubaisi	189	221	214	155	149	192	1120
19	Bahrain 2 (BRN)	588	589	653	625	550	573	3578
	Yusuf Mohamed Falah	193	224	199	243	158	222	1239
	Mahdi Asadalla	176	160	209	183	188	180	1096
	Osama Khalfan	219	205	245	199	204	171	1243
20	China 2 (CHN)	612	640	675	535	554	557	3573
	Sha Mingjian	182	217	258	173	145	192	1167
	Jiang Yong	176	200	215	169	185	190	1135
	Zhang Ye	254	223	202	193	224	175	1271
21	South Korea 1 (KOR)	599	625	626	503	554	653	3560
	Kim Myung-jo	203	203	181	177	178	187	1129
	Jo Nam-yi	223	212	241	195	181	257	1309
	Kim Kyung-min	173	210	204	131	195	208	1121
22	Hong Kong 1 (HKG)	571	607	607	593	546	562	3486
	Hui Cheung Kwok	180	214	205	210	163	224	1196
	Chung Him	172	191	206	203	207	153	1132
	Wu Siu Hong	219	202	196	180	176	185	1158
23	Hong Kong 2 (HKG)	606	535	557	597	593	596	3484
	Eric Lau	221	210	190	155	200	202	1178
	Norman Law	184	142	181	229	189	212	1137
	Rocky Hui	201	183	186	213	204	182	1169
24	Macau 1 (MAC)	607	543	578	615	532	577	3452
	Sou Wai Chon	172	179	171	214	172	179	1087
	Choi Iao Man	234	201	203	204	167	228	1237
	Jose Manuel Machon	201	163	204	197	193	170	1128
25	Chinese Taipei 2 (TPE)	596	601	513	554	640	547	3451
	Tsai Chun-lin	201	202	201	226	227	199	1256
	Tsai Te-ko	199	163	157	160	205	203	1087
	Chen Chih-wen	196	236	155	168	208	145	1108
26	Bahrain 1 (BRN)	540	512	568	599	600	600	3419
	Khalid Al-Khaja	185	154	168	207	187	186	1087
	Ahmed Al-Awadhi	199	178	221	193	224	180	1195
	Ayoob Hassan	156	180	179	199	189	234	1137
27	Kazakhstan 1 (KAZ)	493	557	610	648	540	559	3407
	Galymzhan Tashimov	139	193	158	231	170	191	1082
	Dulat Turlykhanov	166	161	202	235	143	200	1107
	Kairat Baibolatov	188	203	250	182	227	168	1218
28	Saudi Arabia 2 (KSA)	508	570	582	559	585	592	3396
	Meshal Handi	161	167	187	178	179	232	1104
	Bassam Ghonaim	164	179	217	211	192	170	1133
	Abidah Al-Bargi	183	224	178	170	214	190	1159
29	Singapore 2 (SIN)	558	630	541	537	559	521	3346
	Alvin Kwang	199	268	213	151	205	146	1182
	Dominic Lim	182	195	181	203	184	191	1136
	Carl de Vries	177	167	147	183	170	184	1028
30	Mongolia 1 (MGL)	584	528	502	479	512	495	3100
	Miyegombyn Tüvshinsanaa	202	176	178	158	186	180	1080
	Tsend-Ochiryn Bolor-Erdene	187	159	125	157	168	148	944
	Adilbishiin Baatarbold	195	193	199	164	158	167	1076
31	Mongolia 2 (MGL)	409	457	464	471	428	475	2704
	Gendenjamtsyn Badamsambuu	125	158	159	146	136	173	897
	Tulgyn Altangerel	136	157	125	158	148	160	884
	Galbadrakhyn Sunduijav	148	142	180	167	144	142	923
Individuals
	Shaik Abdul Hameed (IND)	184	207	205	213	227	219	1255
	Abdrakhman Abinayev (KAZ)	163	160	204	155	198	201	1081
	Marat Turlykhanov (KAZ)	191	205	213	204	223	168	1204
	Choi Io Fai (MAC)	181	167	177	158	213	199	1095
	Andre Souza (MAC)	162	166	161	172	148	166	975
	Terdporn Manophaiboon (THA)	216	234	203	191	197	155	1196
	Bunsong Numthuam (THA)	141	146	200	205	180	229	1101
