= Sailing at the 2002 Asian Games – Boys' Optimist =

Boys' Optimist at the 2002 Asian Games
- Venue: Busan Yachting Center
- Date: 3–9 October 2002
- Competitors: 11 from 11 nations

Medalists
gold medal	Shibuki Iitsuka	Japan
silver medal	Zhu Ye	China
bronze medal	Teo Wee Chin	Singapore

The boys' Optimist competition at the 2002 Asian Games in Busan was held from 3 to 9 October 2002.

== Schedule ==
All times are Korea Standard Time (UTC+09:00)

Date	Time	Event
Thursday, 3 October 2002	11:00	Race 1
Thursday, 3 October 2002	14:00	Race 2
Friday, 4 October 2002	11:00	Race 3
Saturday, 5 October 2002	10:00	Race 4
Saturday, 5 October 2002	11:00	Race 5
Saturday, 5 October 2002	14:00	Race 6
Monday, 7 October 2002	11:00	Race 7
Monday, 7 October 2002	14:00	Race 8
Tuesday, 8 October 2002	11:00	Race 9
Wednesday, 9 October 2002	10:00	Race 10
Wednesday, 9 October 2002	11:00	Race 11

== Results ==
Legend

- DNC — Did not come to the starting area
- DNS — Did not start
- DSQ — Disqualification

Rank	Athlete	Race											Total
Rank	Athlete	1	2	3	4	5	6	7	8	9	10	11	Total
1st place, gold medalist(s)	Shibuki Iitsuka (JPN)	2	2	3	~~(8)~~	2	~~(7)~~	1	1	1	1	1	14
2nd place, silver medalist(s)	Zhu Ye (CHN)	1	1	~~(6)~~	3	1	~~(12)~~; DSQ	5	2	2	2	6	23
3rd place, bronze medalist(s)	Teo Wee Chin (SIN)	3	5	~~(8)~~	1	3	1	4	3	~~(7)~~	6	2	28
4	Chew Xian Jian (MAS)	~~(5)~~	3	1	2	~~(6)~~	2	3	4	4	5	4	28
5	Ariya Hongtieng (THA)	7	4	2	4	5	5	2	~~(8)~~	~~(8)~~	7	3	39
6	Cho Sung-min (KOR)	4	~~(7)~~	5	6	4	3	6	5	3	3	~~(7)~~	39
7	Joseph Jayson Villena (PHI)	8	6	7	5	~~(11)~~	4	7	7	~~(9)~~	4	9	57
8	Yu Chi Lok (HKG)	~~(11)~~	8	9	7	8	9	~~(11)~~	9	5	9	5	69
9	Salil Sabir (IND)	6	9	~~(10)~~	9	7	6	8	6	~~(11)~~	10	10	71
10	Thet Phyo Win (MYA)	9	~~(10)~~	4	~~(10)~~	10	10	9	10	6	8	8	74
11	Muhammad Huzaifa Farooqi (PAK)	10	11	11	11	9	8	10	~~(12)~~; DNS	10	~~(12)~~; DNC	12; DNC	92
