= Wushu at the 2002 Asian Games =

- Venue: Minseok Sports Center
- Dates: 10–13 October 2002
- Competitors: 142 from 23 nations

Wushu was contested by both men and women at the 2002 Asian Games in Busan, South Korea from October 10 to October 13, 2002. It was included competitions in the disciplines of Taijiquan, Taijijian, Changquan, Daoshu, Jianshu, Gunshu, Qiangshu, Nanquan, Nangun, Nandao, and Sanshou. All events were held at Dongseo University Minseok Sports Center.

== Schedule ==
●	Round	●	Last round	R	Round of 16	¼	Quarterfinals	½	Semifinals	F	Final

Event↓/Date →	10th Thu	11th Fri	12th Sat	13th Sun
Men's changquan combined	●	●		●
Men's nanquan combined	●		●	●
Men's taijiquan combined		●	●	
Men's sanshou 52 kg	R	¼	½	F
Men's sanshou 56 kg	R	¼	½	F
Men's sanshou 60 kg	R	¼	½	F
Men's sanshou 65 kg	R	¼	½	F
Men's sanshou 70 kg		¼	½	F
Women's changquan combined	●	●		●
Women's nanquan combined		●	●	●
Women's taijiquan combined	●		●	

== Medalists ==
=== Men's taolu ===
Event	Gold	Silver	Bronze
Changquan combined	Yuan Xindong; China	Dennis To; Hong Kong	Arvin Ting; Philippines
Nanquan combined	Ho Ro Bin; Malaysia	Hu Lifeng; China	Cheng Ka Ho; Hong Kong
Taijiquan combined	Yang Seong-chan; South Korea	Chan Ming-shu; Chinese Taipei	Bobby Co; Philippines

=== Men's sanshou ===
Event	Gold	Silver	Bronze
52 kg	Kang Yonggang; China	Marvin Sicomen; Philippines	Lee Hou-cheng; Chinese Taipei
52 kg	Kang Yonggang; China	Marvin Sicomen; Philippines	Phoukhong Khamsounthone; Laos
56 kg	Sanchai Chomphuphuang; Thailand	Rexel Nganhayna; Philippines	Ölziibadrakhyn Saruul-Od; Mongolia
56 kg	Sanchai Chomphuphuang; Thailand	Rexel Nganhayna; Philippines	Yeh Chun-chang; Chinese Taipei
60 kg	Liu Zedong; China	Kim Gwee-jong; South Korea	Vanxay Oudomphon; Laos
60 kg	Liu Zedong; China	Kim Gwee-jong; South Korea	Vichan Toonkratork; Thailand
65 kg	Angkhan Chomphuphuang; Thailand	Mohammad Aghaei; Iran	Yu Dawei; China
65 kg	Angkhan Chomphuphuang; Thailand	Mohammad Aghaei; Iran	Eduard Folayang; Philippines
70 kg	Hossein Ojaghi; Iran	Metee Ponork; Thailand	Magsarjavyn Batjargal; Mongolia
70 kg	Hossein Ojaghi; Iran	Metee Ponork; Thailand	Li Jie; China

=== Women's taolu ===
Event	Gold	Silver	Bronze
Changquan combined	Li Ao; China	Han Jing; Macau	Nguyễn Thị Mỹ Đức; Vietnam
Nanquan combined	Huang Chunni; China	Nguyễn Thị Ngọc Oanh; Vietnam	Swe Swe Thant; Myanmar
Taijiquan combined	Khaing Khaing Maw; Myanmar	Li Fai; Hong Kong	Jessie Liew; Singapore

== Medal table ==
Rank	Nation	Gold	Silver	Bronze	Total
1	China (CHN)	5	1	2	8
2	Thailand (THA)	2	1	1	4
3	Iran (IRI)	1	1	0	2
3	South Korea (KOR)	1	1	0	2
5	Myanmar (MYA)	1	0	1	2
6	Malaysia (MAS)	1	0	0	1
7	Philippines (PHI)	0	2	3	5
8	Hong Kong (HKG)	0	2	1	3
9	Chinese Taipei (TPE)	0	1	2	3
10	Vietnam (VIE)	0	1	1	2
11	Macau (MAC)	0	1	0	1
12	Laos (LAO)	0	0	2	2
12	Mongolia (MGL)	0	0	2	2
14	Singapore (SIN)	0	0	1	1
Totals (14 entries)		11	11	16	38

== Participating nations ==
A total of 142 athletes from 23 nations competed in wushu at the 2002 Asian Games:

- China (10)
- Chinese Taipei (10)
- Hong Kong (9)
- Indonesia (6)
- Iran (7)
- Japan (9)
- Kazakhstan (5)
- Kyrgyzstan (3)
- Laos (3)
- Lebanon (2)
- Macau (11)
- Malaysia (8)
- Mongolia (4)
- Myanmar (5)
- Nepal (4)
- Pakistan (1)
- Philippines (10)
- Singapore (5)
- South Korea (11)
- Sri Lanka (1)
- Thailand (5)
- Vietnam (11)
- Yemen (2)
