= Bowling at the 2002 Asian Games =

- Venue: Homeplus Asiad Bowling Alley
- Dates: 3–9 October 2002
- Competitors: 149 from 18 nations

Bowling took place for the men's and women's individual, doubles, trios, and team events at the 2002 Asian Games in Busan, South Korea from October 3 to October 9. All events were held at the Homeplus Asiad Bowling Alley.

== Schedule ==
●	Round	●	Last round	P	Preliminary	F	Final

Event↓/Date →	3rd Thu	4th Fri	5th Sat	6th Sun	7th Mon	8th Tue	9th Wed	
Men's singles	●							
Men's doubles		●						
Men's trios			●	●				
Men's team of 5			●		●			
Men's masters						P	P	F
Women's singles	●							
Women's doubles		●						
Women's trios			●	●				
Women's team of 5				●	●			
Women's masters						P	P	F

== Medalists ==
=== Men ===
Event	Gold	Silver	Bronze
Singles	Remy Ong; Singapore	Yannaphon Larpapharat; Thailand	Shared silver
Singles	Remy Ong; Singapore	Shaker Ali Al-Hassan; United Arab Emirates	Shared silver
Doubles	Philippines; Paeng Nepomuceno; R. J. Bautista	Japan; Isao Yamamoto; Seiji Watanabe	South Korea; Kim Myung-jo; Jo Nam-yi
Doubles	Philippines; Paeng Nepomuceno; R. J. Bautista	Japan; Isao Yamamoto; Seiji Watanabe	Chinese Taipei; Tsai Ting-yun; Chen Chih-wen
Trios	Singapore; Sam Goh; Lee Yu Wen; Remy Ong	Philippines; Christian Jan Suarez; Chester King; Leonardo Rey	Shared silver
Trios	Singapore; Sam Goh; Lee Yu Wen; Remy Ong	United Arab Emirates; Mohammed Al-Qubaisi; Shaker Ali Al-Hassan; Hulaiman Al-Hameli	Shared silver
Team of 5	Japan; Shigeo Saito; Isao Yamamoto; Seiji Watanabe; Masahiro Hibi; Hirofumi Morimoto; Masaru Ito	South Korea; Seo Kook; Byun Ho-jin; Kim Myung-jo; Kim Jae-hoon; Jo Nam-yi; Kim Kyung-min	Chinese Taipei; Kao Hai-yuan; Tsai Chun-lin; Tsai Ting-yun; Hsieh Yu-ping; Chen Chih-wen; Tsai Te-ko
Team of 5	Japan; Shigeo Saito; Isao Yamamoto; Seiji Watanabe; Masahiro Hibi; Hirofumi Morimoto; Masaru Ito	South Korea; Seo Kook; Byun Ho-jin; Kim Myung-jo; Kim Jae-hoon; Jo Nam-yi; Kim Kyung-min	United Arab Emirates; Nayef Eqab; Mohammed Al-Qubaisi; Sultan Al-Marzouqi; Shaker Ali Al-Hassan; Hulaiman Al-Hameli; Sayed Ibrahim Al-Hashemi
Masters	Remy Ong; Singapore	Mubarak Al-Merikhi; Qatar	Ahmed Shahin Al-Merikhi; Qatar

=== Women ===
Event	Gold	Silver	Bronze
Singles	Kim Soo-kyung; South Korea	Miyuki Kubotani; Japan	Liza Clutario; Philippines
Doubles	Malaysia; Sarah Yap; Wendy Chai	South Korea; Cha Mi-jung; Kim Soo-kyung	Chinese Taipei; Wang Yi-fen; Wang Yu-ling
Trios	South Korea; Cha Mi-jung; Kim Soo-kyung; Kim Yeau-jin	Chinese Taipei; Huang Chung-yao; Wang Yi-fen; Wang Yu-ling	Malaysia; Shalin Zulkifli; Sarah Yap; Wendy Chai
Team of 5	South Korea; Kim Hee-soon; Cha Mi-jung; Kim Soo-kyung; Kim Yeau-jin; Kim Hyo-mi; Nam Bo-ra	Philippines; Liza del Rosario; Irene Garcia; Liza Clutario; Josephine Canare; Cecilia Yap; Kathleen Ann Lopez	Chinese Taipei; Chou Miao-lin; Huang Chung-yao; Wang Yi-fen; Wang Yu-ling; Huang Tsai-feng; Chu Yu-chieh
Masters	Shalin Zulkifli; Malaysia	Lai Kin Ngoh; Malaysia	Kim Hyo-mi; South Korea

== Medal table ==
Rank	Nation	Gold	Silver	Bronze	Total
1	South Korea (KOR)	3	2	2	7
2	Singapore (SIN)	3	0	0	3
3	Malaysia (MAS)	2	1	1	4
4	Philippines (PHI)	1	2	1	4
5	Japan (JPN)	1	2	0	3
6	United Arab Emirates (UAE)	0	2	1	3
7	Chinese Taipei (TPE)	0	1	4	5
8	Qatar (QAT)	0	1	1	2
9	Thailand (THA)	0	1	0	1
Totals (9 entries)		10	12	10	32

== Participating nations ==
A total of 149 athletes from 18 nations competed in bowling at the 2002 Asian Games:

- Bahrain (6)
- China (6)
- Chinese Taipei (12)
- Hong Kong (12)
- India (1)
- Japan (12)
- Kazakhstan (5)
- Kuwait (6)
- Macau (6)
- Malaysia (12)
- Mongolia (9)
- Philippines (12)
- Qatar (6)
- Saudi Arabia (6)
- Singapore (12)
- South Korea (12)
- Thailand (8)
- United Arab Emirates (6)
