= Sailing at the 2002 Asian Games – Girls' Optimist =

Girls' Optimist at the 2002 Asian Games
- Venue: Busan Yachting Center
- Date: 3–9 October 2002
- Competitors: 9 from 9 nations

Medalists
gold medal	Xu Lijia	China
silver medal	Yoko Kiuchi	Japan
bronze medal	Sarah Tan	Singapore

The girls' Optimist competition at the 2002 Asian Games in Busan was held from 3 to 9 October 2002.

== Schedule ==
All times are Korea Standard Time (UTC+09:00)

Date	Time	Event
Thursday, 3 October 2002	11:00	Race 1
Thursday, 3 October 2002	14:00	Race 2
Friday, 4 October 2002	11:00	Race 3
Saturday, 5 October 2002	10:00	Race 4
Saturday, 5 October 2002	11:00	Race 5
Saturday, 5 October 2002	14:00	Race 6
Monday, 7 October 2002	11:00	Race 7
Monday, 7 October 2002	14:00	Race 8
Tuesday, 8 October 2002	11:00	Race 9
Wednesday, 9 October 2002	10:00	Race 10
Wednesday, 9 October 2002	11:00	Race 11

== Results ==
Legend

- DNC — Did not come to the starting area
- DNS — Did not start
- OCS — On course side

Rank	Athlete	Race											Total
Rank	Athlete	1	2	3	4	5	6	7	8	9	10	11	Total
1st place, gold medalist(s)	Xu Lijia (CHN)	1	1	~~(4)~~	~~(4)~~	1	1	2	2	2	2	2	14
2nd place, silver medalist(s)	Yoko Kiuchi (JPN)	3	3	2	3	2	~~(5)~~	1	~~(4)~~	3	1	1	19
3rd place, bronze medalist(s)	Sarah Tan (SIN)	~~(6)~~	2	1	1	3	3	3	3	~~(5)~~	4	5	25
4	Sandra Lili Yin (MAS)	4	4	3	~~(5)~~	5	4	4	1	4	~~(7)~~	4	33
5	Chit Su (MYA)	5	5	5	~~(6)~~	4	6	5	~~(7)~~	1	3	3	37
6	Park Hae-deun (KOR)	2	6	~~(7)~~	2	7	2	7	6	~~(8)~~	6	6	44
7	Shilpa Oberoi (IND)	~~(7)~~	~~(7)~~	6	7	6	7	6	5	7	5	7	56
8	Lealyn Taruja (PHI)	8	~~(9)~~	8	8	~~(9)~~	8	8	8	6	8	8	70
9	Andrea Yasmin Rehman (PAK)	9	8	9	~~(10)~~; DNS	8	~~(10)~~; OCS	9	9	9	10; DNC	10; DNC	81
