= Table tennis at the 2002 Asian Games – Women's singles =

Women's singles at the 2002 Asian Games
- Venue: Dongchun Gymnasium
- Dates: 8–9 October 2002
- Competitors: 22 from 12 nations

Medalists
gold medal	Zhang Yining	China
silver medal	Wang Nan	China
bronze medal	Li Jiawei	Singapore
bronze medal	Ryu Ji-hye	South Korea

The women's singles table tennis event was part of the table tennis programme and took place between October 8 and 9, at the Dongchun Gymnasium, Ulsan.

== Schedule ==
All times are Korea Standard Time (UTC+09:00)

Date	Time	Event
Tuesday, 8 October 2002	15:30	1st round
Tuesday, 8 October 2002	16:15	2nd round
Tuesday, 8 October 2002	17:45	Quarterfinals
Wednesday, 9 October 2002	14:00	Semifinals
Wednesday, 9 October 2002	16:30	Final

== Results ==
Legend

- WO — Won by walkover

=== Finals ===
Semifinals						Final
1	Wang Nan (CHN)	11	11	12	11
4	Li Jiawei (SIN)	5	8	10	8	1	Wang Nan (CHN)	7	6	11	14	8	11	9
3	Ryu Ji-hye (KOR)	8	7	8	6	2	Zhang Yining (CHN)	11	11	7	12	11	6	11
2	Zhang Yining (CHN)	11	11	11	11

=== Top half ===
==== Section 1 ====
1st round			2nd round						Quarterfinals
			1	Wang Nan (CHN)	11	13	11	11
Madina Ayubova (UZB)				Kim Moo-kyo (KOR)	7	11	3	1
Kim Moo-kyo (KOR)	W	O							1	Wang Nan (CHN)	11	13	11	11
									6	Kim Hyon-hui (PRK)	4	11	5	6
				An Konishi (JPN)	8	7	9	3
			6	Kim Hyon-hui (PRK)	11	11	11	11

==== Section 2 ====
1st round						2nd round							Quarterfinals
						5	Tie Ya Na (HKG)	11	11	11	11
Crisanta Abas (PHI)	8	4	11	9	10		Ghazala Rohi (PAK)	2	5	4	4
Ghazala Rohi (PAK)	11	11	8	11	12								5	Tie Ya Na (HKG)	6	11	11	7	9	11	6
Huang Yi-hua (TPE)	11	11	11	11									4	Li Jiawei (SIN)	11	8	5	11	11	5	11
Batsaikhany Batkhishig (MGL)	4	4	2	4			Huang Yi-hua (TPE)	3	11	4	6	5
						4	Li Jiawei (SIN)	11	8	11	11	11

=== Bottom half ===
==== Section 3 ====
1st round					2nd round							Quarterfinals
					3	Ryu Ji-hye (KOR)	11	11	11	11
Tatiana Tcherestova (JOR)	5	1	6	4		Lu Yun-feng (TPE)	5	3	8	9
Lu Yun-feng (TPE)	11	11	11	11								3	Ryu Ji-hye (KOR)	11	8	11	11	11
Kim Hyang-mi (PRK)	11	11	11	11								8	Lau Sui Fei (HKG)	3	11	6	4	6
Möngöntsetsegiin Batjargal (MGL)	1	2	1	2		Kim Hyang-mi (PRK)	11	8	9	12	9
					8	Lau Sui Fei (HKG)	5	11	11	14	11

==== Section 4 ====
1st round			2nd round								Quarterfinals
			7	Jing Junhong (SIN)	6	8	11	11	11	9
				Aya Umemura (JPN)	11	11	13	5	8	11
												Aya Umemura (JPN)	11	11	11	8	9	12	7
Manzura Inoyatova (UZB)											2	Zhang Yining (CHN)	9	9	5	11	11	14	11
Shabnam Bilal (PAK)	W	O		Shabnam Bilal (PAK)	2	2	3	3
			2	Zhang Yining (CHN)	11	11	11	11
