= Bodybuilding at the 2002 Asian Games – Men's 70 kg =

Men's 70 kg at the 2002 Asian Games
- Venue: Busan Citizens' Hall
- Date: 3–5 October 2002
- Competitors: 13 from 10 nations

Medalists
gold medal	Han Dong-ki	South Korea
silver medal	Toshihiko Hirota	Japan
bronze medal	Koji Godo	Japan

The men's 70 kilograms event at the 2002 Asian Games was held on October 3 and October 5, 2002 at the Busan Citizens' Hall in Busan, South Korea.

== Schedule ==
All times are Korea Standard Time (UTC+09:00)

Date	Time	Event
Thursday, 3 October 2002	11:30	Preliminary round
Saturday, 5 October 2002	15:20	Final round

== Results ==
=== Preliminary round ===
Order	Athlete	Note
1	Han Dong-ki (KOR)	Pass
2	Mohamed Afrah Khaleel (MDV)	
3	Aung Khaing Win (MYA)	Pass
4	Walid Aman Al-Rahma (UAE)	
5	Mubarak Mohammed (QAT)	
6	Lin Peiqu (CHN)	Pass
7	Koji Godo (JPN)	Pass
8	Mohd Nazaruddin Seladin (SIN)	Pass
9	Hussain Jassim (BRN)	
10	Saeed Al-Mansoori (UAE)	
11	Nor Perwira Jaya Rahmat (SIN)	
12	Võ Tấn Sang (VIE)	
13	Toshihiko Hirota (JPN)	Pass

=== Final round ===
Rank	Athlete
1st place, gold medalist(s)	Han Dong-ki (KOR)
2nd place, silver medalist(s)	Toshihiko Hirota (JPN)
3rd place, bronze medalist(s)	Koji Godo (JPN)
4	Mohd Nazaruddin Seladin (SIN)
5	Lin Peiqu (CHN)
6	Aung Khaing Win (MYA)
