= Bodybuilding at the 2002 Asian Games – Men's 65 kg =

Men's 65 kg at the 2002 Asian Games
- Venue: Busan Citizens' Hall
- Date: 4–6 October 2002
- Competitors: 9 from 8 nations

Medalists
gold medal	Abdul Halim Haron	Singapore
silver medal	Lee Lap Chi	Hong Kong
bronze medal	Amir Zainal	Singapore

The men's 65 kilograms event at the 2002 Asian Games was held on October 4 and October 6, 2002 at the Busan Citizens' Hall in Busan, South Korea.

== Schedule ==
All times are Korea Standard Time (UTC+09:00)

Date	Time	Event
Friday, 4 October 2002	10:00	Preliminary round
Sunday, 6 October 2002	14:00	Final round

== Results ==
=== Preliminary round ===
Order	Athlete	Note
1	Hussain Jassim (QAT)	
2	Om Do-kyung (KOR)	Pass
3	Lee Lap Chi (HKG)	Pass
4	Khalid Ali (PAK)	
5	Ahmed Hussain (UAE)	
6	Cao Quốc Phú (VIE)	Pass
7	Win Lwin (MYA)	Pass
8	Abdul Halim Haron (SIN)	Pass
9	Amir Zainal (SIN)	Pass

=== Final round ===
Rank	Athlete
1st place, gold medalist(s)	Abdul Halim Haron (SIN)
2nd place, silver medalist(s)	Lee Lap Chi (HKG)
3rd place, bronze medalist(s)	Amir Zainal (SIN)
4	Cao Quốc Phú (VIE)
5	Om Do-kyung (KOR)
6	Win Lwin (MYA)
