= Synchronized swimming at the 2002 Asian Games =

- Venue: Sajik Swimming Pool
- Dates: 30 September – 2 October 2002
- Competitors: 16 from 7 nations

Synchronized swimming was contested from September 30 to October 2 at the 2002 Asian Games in Busan, South Korea. with all events taking place at the Sajik Swimming Pool. A total of 16 athletes from seven nations competed in the event, Japan won both gold medals, South Korea and China tied on the medal table with a silver and a bronze.

== Schedule ==
T	Technical routine	F	Free routine

Event↓/Date →	30th Mon	1st Tue	2nd Wed
Women's solo	T	F	
Women's duet	T		F

== Medalists ==
Event	Gold	Silver	Bronze
Solo	Miya Tachibana; Japan	Jang Yoon-kyeong; South Korea	Li Zhen; China
Duet	Japan; Miya Tachibana; Miho Takeda	China; Gu Beibei; Zhang Xiaohuan	South Korea; Jang Yoon-kyeong; Kim Min-jeong

== Medal table ==
Rank	Nation	Gold	Silver	Bronze	Total
1	Japan (JPN)	2	0	0	2
2	China (CHN)	0	1	1	2
2	South Korea (KOR)	0	1	1	2
Totals (3 entries)		2	2	2	6

== Participating nations ==
A total of 16 athletes from 7 nations competed in synchronized swimming at the 2002 Asian Games:

- China (3)
- Hong Kong (2)
- Japan (2)
- Kazakhstan (2)
- Macau (3)
- South Korea (2)
- Uzbekistan (2)
