= Bodybuilding at the 2002 Asian Games – Men's 60 kg =

Men's 60 kg at the 2002 Asian Games
- Venue: Busan Citizens' Hall
- Date: 3–5 October 2002
- Competitors: 9 from 9 nations

Medalists
gold medal	Cho Wang-bung	South Korea
silver medal	Ibrahim Sihat	Singapore
bronze medal	Phạm Văn Mách	Vietnam

The men's 60 kilograms event at the 2002 Asian Games was held on October 3 and October 5, 2002 at the Busan Citizens' Hall in Busan, South Korea.

== Schedule ==
All times are Korea Standard Time (UTC+09:00)

Date	Time	Event
Thursday, 3 October 2002	10:00	Preliminary round
Saturday, 5 October 2002	14:00	Final round

== Results ==
=== Preliminary round ===
Order	Athlete	Note
1	Tun Tun Aung (MYA)	Pass
2	Gennadiy Cherkassov (KAZ)	
3	Chen Jung-sheng (TPE)	Pass
4	Hiroshi Tsuda (JPN)	
5	Cho Wang-bung (KOR)	Pass
6	Phạm Văn Mách (VIE)	Pass
7	Ibrahim Sihat (SIN)	Pass
8	Asrelawandi (INA)	Pass
9	Roman Cortuna (PHI)	

=== Final round ===
Rank	Athlete
1st place, gold medalist(s)	Cho Wang-bung (KOR)
2nd place, silver medalist(s)	Ibrahim Sihat (SIN)
3rd place, bronze medalist(s)	Phạm Văn Mách (VIE)
4	Asrelawandi (INA)
5	Tun Tun Aung (MYA)
6	Chen Jung-sheng (TPE)
