= 2002 Asian Games medal table =

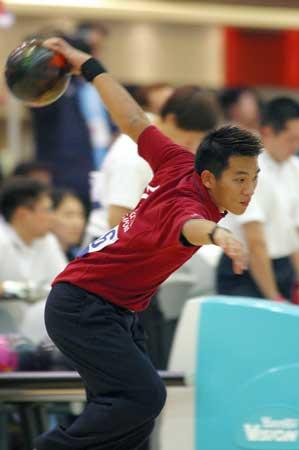
- Singaporean bowler Lee Yu-Wen at the 2002 Asian Games in Busan, South Korea.
- Location: Busan, South Korea

Highlights
- Most gold medals: China 150
- Most total medals: China 308
- Medalling NOCs: 39

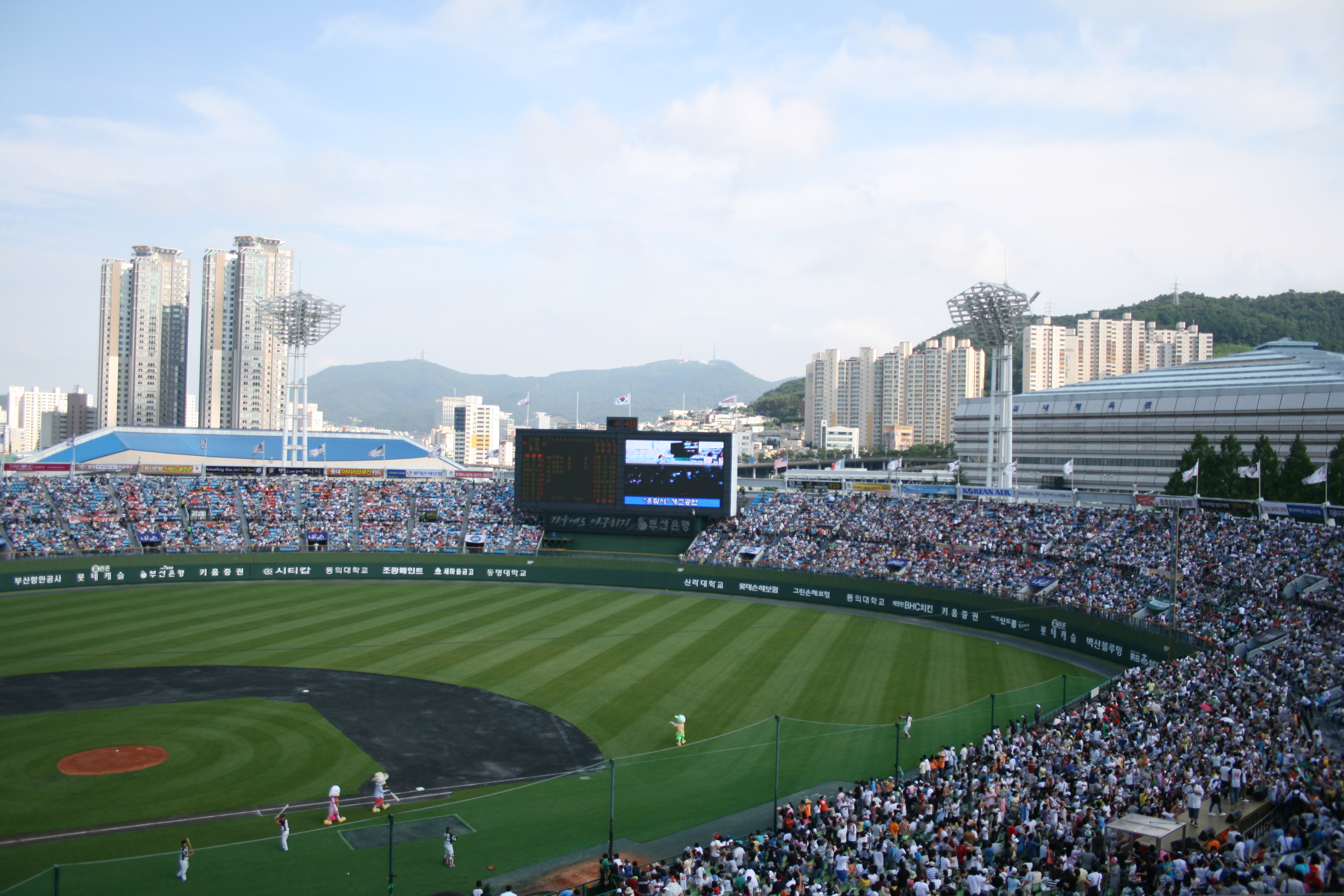
Sajik Baseball Stadium hosted baseball.

The 2002 Asian Games (officially known as the 14th Asian Games) was a multi-sport event held in Busan, South Korea from September 29 to October 14, 2002. Busan was the second South Korean city to host the Games, after Seoul in 1986. A total of 6,572 athletes—4,605 men and 1,967 women—from 44 Asian National Olympic Committees (NOCs) participated in 38 sports divided into 419 events. The number of competing athletes was higher than the 1998 Asian Games, in which 6,544 athletes from 41 NOCs participated. It was the first time in the history of the Asian Games that all 44 member nations of the Olympic Council of Asia (OCA) participated in the Games. Afghanistan returned after the fall of the Taliban government in the midst of ongoing war; East Timor, newest member of the OCA made its debut; and North Korea competed for the first time in an international sporting event hosted by South Korea. Both nations marched together at the opening ceremony with a Korean Unification Flag depicting the Korean Peninsula as United Korea.

Athletes from 39 nations won at least one medal, and athletes from 27 of these nations secured at least one gold. Eight NOCs—Kazakhstan, Uzbekistan, India, Singapore, Vietnam, Qatar, Philippines and Kyrgyzstan—improved their position in the general medal table compared to the 1998 Asian Games. China topped the medal table for the sixth consecutive time in the Asian Games, with 150 gold medals. Athletes from China won the most silver medals (84) and the most medals overall (308). China became the first nation in the history of Asian Games to cross the 300 medal-mark in one edition. Competitors from the South Korea led the bronze medal count with 84. South Korea also won 96 gold medals, 80 silver medals and a total of 260 medals, finishing second on the medal table. Japanese athletes claimed 189 medals in total (including 44 gold), earning third spot on the table.

== Medal table ==
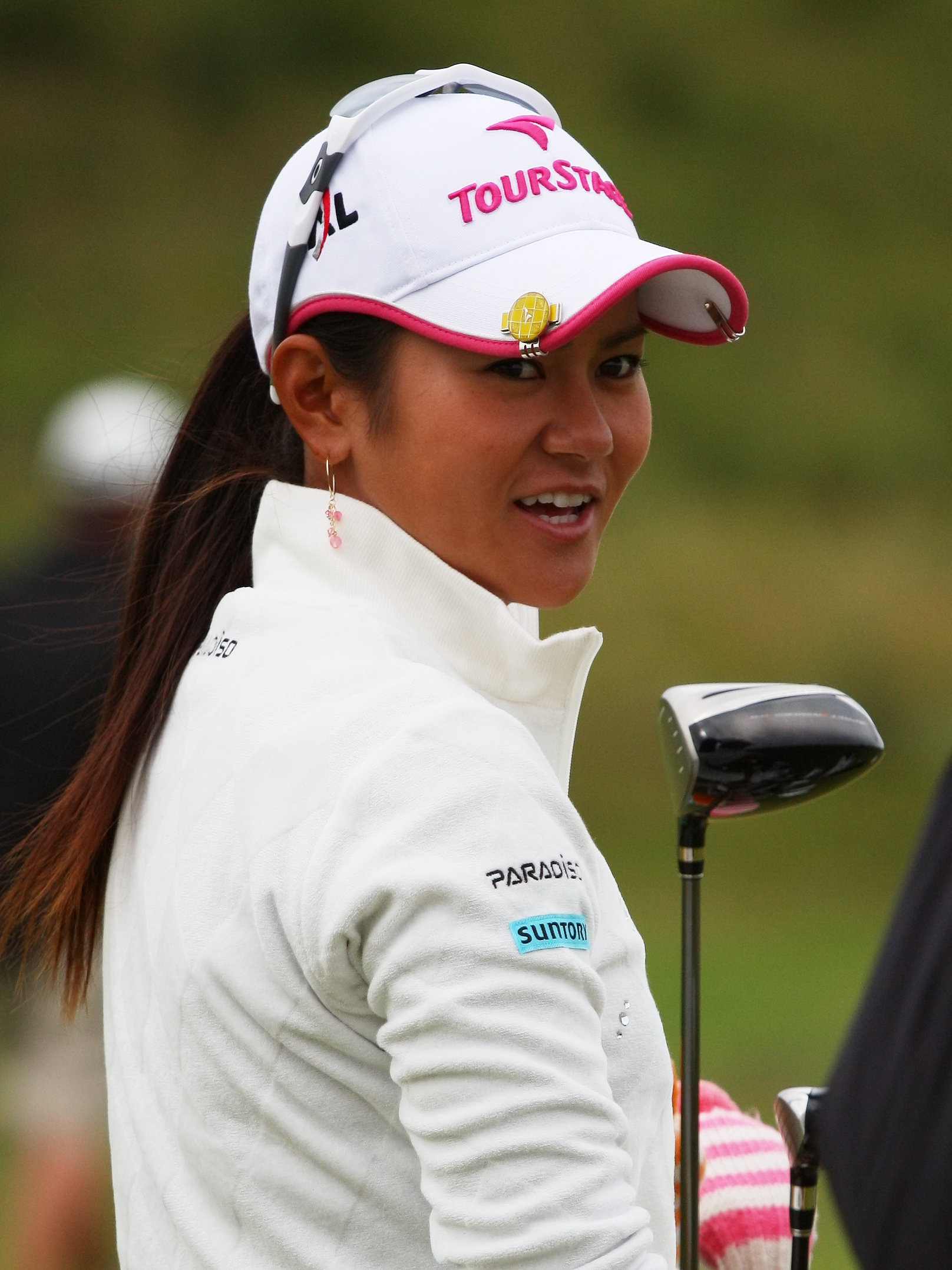
Japanese golfer Ai Miyazato won a gold medal in the individual event, and was a member of the silver medalist Japanese team.

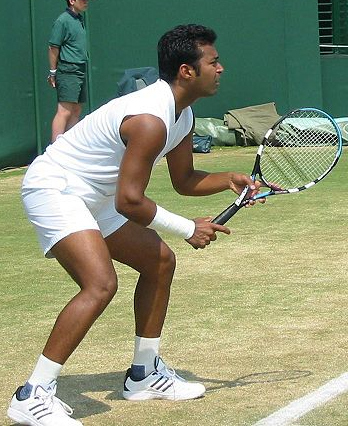
Leander Paes from India won a gold in the men's doubles (paired with Mahesh Bhupathi) and bronze in mixed doubles (paired with Sania Mirza) tennis events.

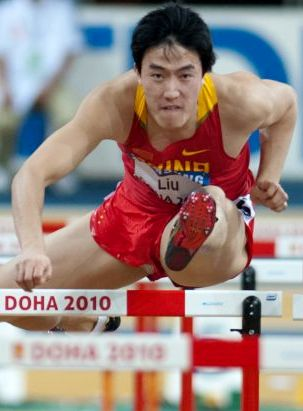
Liu Xiang from China won a gold medal in the 110–meter hurdles.

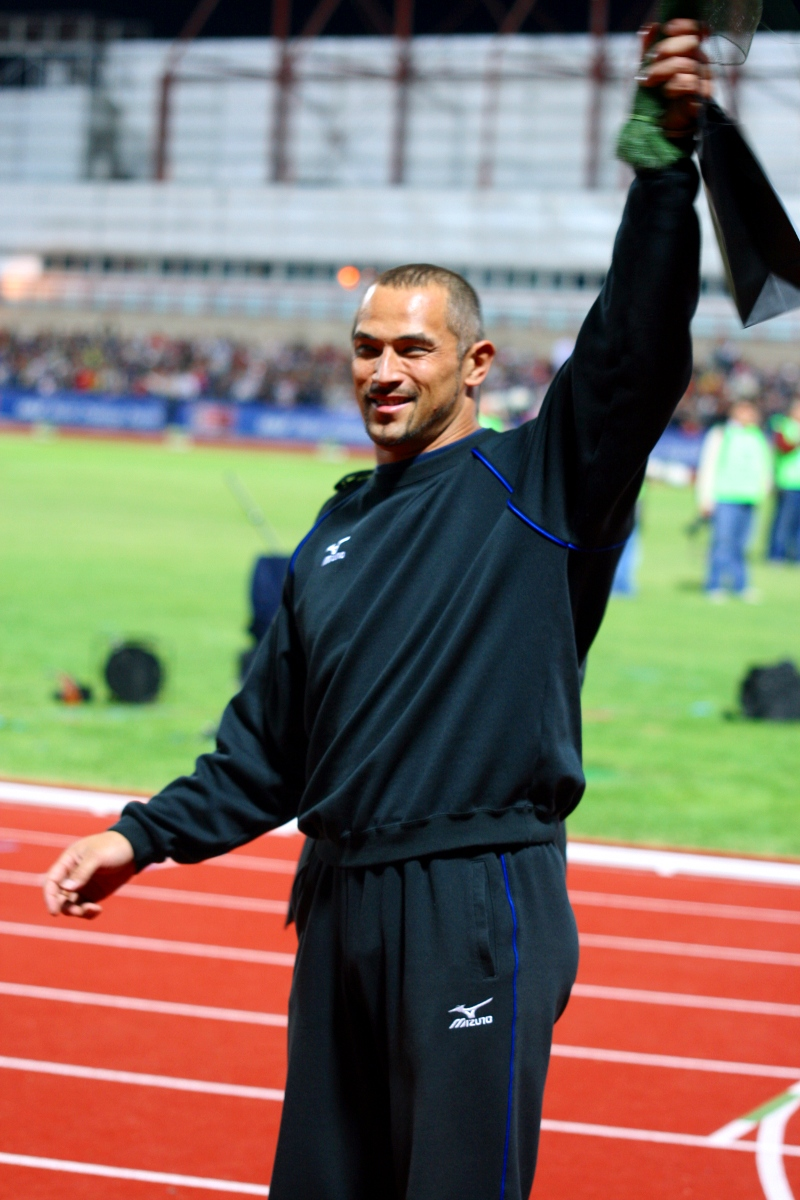
Japanese athlete Koji Murofushi won a gold medal in the hammer throw event.

The ranking in this table is consistent with International Olympic Committee convention in its published medal tables. By default, the table is ordered by the number of gold medals the athletes from a nation have won (in this context, a nation is an entity represented by a NOC). The number of silver medals is taken into consideration next, followed by the number of bronze medals. If nations are still tied, equal ranking is given; they are listed alphabetically by IOC country code.

A total of 1,350 medals (427 gold, 421 silver and 502 bronze) were awarded. The total number of bronze medals is greater than the total number of gold or silver medals, because two bronze medals were awarded per event in 10 sports: badminton, boxing, judo, karate, sepak takraw, squash, table tennis, taekwondo, tennis, and wushu (sanshou event only).

This discrepancy is also caused by ties. In men's artistic gymnastics, a three-way tie for the gold medal in the horizontal bar meant that no silver and bronze medals were awarded; in the pommel horse, rings and parallel bars ties for first positions resulted in two golds per event, and thus no silvers were awarded; and a tie for silver in the individual all-around resulted in no bronze being awarded. In women's artistic gymnastics, ties for the gold medal in the uneven bars and floor meant that no silvers were awarded for those events. In athletics, a three-way tie in the men's high jump, and ties in the men's 3,000 m steeplechase and the women's high jump for second place meant that no bronzes were awarded for those events. In men's bowling, a tie for second place in the singles and trios resulted in two silver medals per event, and thus no bronzes were awarded; a tie for the bronze-medal position in the doubles and the team of five meant that two bronzes were awarded for each event. In softball, due to rainy weather at the final competition the ranking was decided by the results of the preliminary round and semifinals. Japan was awarded the gold medal based on its unbeaten record in the preliminary games; China and Chinese Taipei shared the silver. Those two were to have played to decide who would meet Japan in the gold-medal game. In swimming, a tie for first position in the men's 50 m freestyle resulted in two gold medals and no silver was awarded; a tie for second position in the women's 100 m freestyle meant that no bronze medal was awarded.

* Host nation (South Korea)

Rank	Nation	Gold	Silver	Bronze	Total
1	China (CHN)	150	84	74	308
2	South Korea (KOR)*	96	80	84	260
3	Japan (JPN)	44	73	72	189
4	Kazakhstan (KAZ)	20	26	30	76
5	Uzbekistan (UZB)	15	12	24	51
6	Thailand (THA)	14	19	10	43
7	India (IND)	11	12	13	36
8	Chinese Taipei (TPE)	10	17	25	52
9	North Korea (PRK)	9	11	13	33
10	Iran (IRI)	8	14	14	36
11	Saudi Arabia (KSA)	7	1	1	9
12	Malaysia (MAS)	6	8	16	30
13	Singapore (SIN)	5	2	10	17
14	Indonesia (INA)	4	7	12	23
15	Vietnam (VIE)	4	7	7	18
16	Hong Kong (HKG)	4	6	11	21
17	Qatar (QAT)	4	5	8	17
18	Philippines (PHI)	3	7	16	26
19	Bahrain (BRN)	3	2	2	7
20	Kuwait (KUW)	2	1	5	8
21	Sri Lanka (SRI)	2	1	3	6
22	Pakistan (PAK)	1	6	6	13
23	Kyrgyzstan (KGZ)	1	5	6	12
23	Myanmar (MYA)	1	5	6	12
25	Turkmenistan (TKM)	1	2	1	4
26	Mongolia (MGL)	1	1	12	14
27	Lebanon (LIB)	1	0	0	1
28	Tajikistan (TJK)	0	2	4	6
29	Macau (MAC)	0	2	2	4
30	United Arab Emirates (UAE)	0	2	1	3
31	Bangladesh (BAN)	0	1	0	1
32	Nepal (NEP)	0	0	3	3
32	Syria (SYR)	0	0	3	3
34	Jordan (JOR)	0	0	2	2
34	Laos (LAO)	0	0	2	2
36	Afghanistan (AFG)	0	0	1	1
36	Brunei (BRU)	0	0	1	1
36	Palestine (PLE)	0	0	1	1
36	Yemen (YEM)	0	0	1	1
Totals (39 entries)		427	421	502	1,350

== Changes in medal standings ==
Ruling date	Sport	Event	Nation	Gold	Silver	Bronze	Total
October 7, 2002	Bodybuilding	Men's +90 kg	Lebanon			−1	−1
October 7, 2002	Bodybuilding	Men's +90 kg	South Korea			+1	+1

On October 7, 2002, the Olympic Council of Asia announced that the bodybuilding bronze medalist in the +90 kg weight category Youssef El-Zein of Lebanon was relieved of his medal for not submitting to a drugs test. After El-Zein was disqualified, the bronze medal in the +90 kg category went to Choi Jae-Duck of South Korea (who had finished fourth).

Six days later, Japanese news agency Kyodo News reported that Indian middle-distance runner Sunita Rani had tested positive for a banned substance, which was later confirmed by Lee Choon-Sup, Deputy Secretary General of the Busan Asian Games Organizing Committee; an unofficial report stated that the substance was the anabolic steroid nandrolone. Sunita had won two medals in athletics: a gold in the 1,500 m (setting an Asian Games record) and a bronze in the 5,000 m, (in which Sunita jointly bettered the Games record set by Indonesian Suprianti Sutono in Bangkok during the 1998 Asian Games with six other athletes). The Indian Chef de Mission at the Games backed Sunita—who denied using any banned drug—and asked for a "B" sample test from Bangkok, but tests were run only at the Asian Games’ Doping Control Center (AGDCC) in Seoul (the laboratory accredited by the IOC). On October 16, the AGDCC confirmed the steroid nandrolone in Sunita's urine sample; as a consequence, the OCA stripped her of both medals and dismissed her Asian Games record for the 1,500 m.

The Indian Olympic Association (IOA) requested the intervention of the International Association of Athletics Federations and the IOC; the samples were jointly reexamined by the World Anti-Doping Agency and the IOC Sub-Commission on Doping and Biochemistry of Sport. In January 2003, the OCA announced that the IOC Medical Director had cleared Sunita of the doping charge and that appropriate action would be taken against the AGDCC. Both of Sunita's medals were reinstated on February 4, 2003, in a ceremony attended by the Secretary General of OCA Randhir Singh and the president of the IOA Suresh Kalmadi.

== See also ==
- All-time Asian Games medal table
