= Synchronized swimming at the 2002 Asian Games – Women's solo =

Women's solo at the 2002 Asian Games
- Venue: Sajik Swimming Pool
- Dates: 30 September – 1 October 2002
- Competitors: 6 from 6 nations

Medalists
gold medal	Miya Tachibana	Japan
silver medal	Jang Yoon-kyeong	South Korea
bronze medal	Li Zhen	China

The women's solo synchronized swimming competition at the 2002 Asian Games in Busan was held on 30 September and 1 October at the Sajik Swimming Pool.

== Schedule ==
All times are Korea Standard Time (UTC+09:00)

Date	Time	Event
Monday, 30 September 2002	13:00	Technical routine
Tuesday, 1 October 2002	15:00	Free routine

== Results ==
Rank	Athlete	Technical (50%)	Free (50%)	Total
1st place, gold medalist(s)	Miya Tachibana (JPN)	48.667	49.000	97.667
2nd place, silver medalist(s)	Jang Yoon-kyeong (KOR)	47.000	47.750	94.750
3rd place, bronze medalist(s)	Li Zhen (CHN)	46.834	47.417	94.251
4	Aliya Karimova (KAZ)	43.833	44.583	88.416
5	Darya Mojaeva (UZB)	42.667	42.667	85.334
6	Wong Wai Kei (MAC)	38.917	40.417	79.334
