= Bodybuilding at the 2002 Asian Games – Men's 75 kg =

Men's 75 kg at the 2002 Asian Games
- Venue: Busan Citizens' Hall
- Date: 4–6 October 2002
- Competitors: 12 from 11 nations

Medalists
gold medal	Simon Chua	Singapore
silver medal	Yoshihiro Yano	Japan
bronze medal	Min Zaw Oo	Myanmar

The men's 75 kilograms event at the 2002 Asian Games was held on October 4 and October 6, 2002 at the Busan Citizens' Hall in Busan, South Korea.

== Schedule ==
All times are Korea Standard Time (UTC+09:00)

Date	Time	Event
Friday, 4 October 2002	11:30	Preliminary round
Sunday, 6 October 2002	15:20	Final round

== Results ==
=== Preliminary round ===
Order	Athlete	Note
1	Kim Myung-sub (KOR)	
2	Min Zaw Oo (MYA)	Pass
3	Yoshihiro Yano (JPN)	Pass
4	Yang Xinmin (CHN)	
5	Javed Akhtar (PAK)	
6	Abdulrazaq Jafar (UAE)	
7	Alfredo Trazona (PHI)	
8	Hendra (INA)	Pass
9	Tashiro Makoto (JPN)	Pass
10	Durongrit Sukdee (THA)	Pass
11	Simon Chua (SIN)	Pass
12	Baiju Gopinathan (IND)	

=== Final round ===
Rank	Athlete
1st place, gold medalist(s)	Simon Chua (SIN)
2nd place, silver medalist(s)	Yoshihiro Yano (JPN)
3rd place, bronze medalist(s)	Min Zaw Oo (MYA)
4	Hendra (INA)
5	Tashiro Makoto (JPN)
6	Durongrit Sukdee (THA)
