= Synchronized swimming at the 2002 Asian Games – Women's duet =

Women's duet at the 2002 Asian Games
- Venue: Sajik Swimming Pool
- Dates: 30 September – 2 October 2002
- Competitors: 14 from 7 nations

Medalists
gold medal	Miya Tachibana; Miho Takeda	Japan
silver medal	Gu Beibei; Zhang Xiaohuan	China
bronze medal	Jang Yoon-kyeong; Kim Min-jeong	South Korea

The women's duet synchronized swimming competition at the 2002 Asian Games in Busan was held on 30 September and 2 October at the Sajik Swimming Pool.

== Schedule ==
All times are Korea Standard Time (UTC+09:00)

Date	Time	Event
Monday, 30 September 2002	16:00	Technical routine
Wednesday, 2 October 2002	15:00	Free routine

== Results ==
Rank	Team	Technical (50%)	Free (50%)	Total
1st place, gold medalist(s)	Japan (JPN); Miya Tachibana; Miho Takeda	48.917	49.500	98.417
2nd place, silver medalist(s)	China (CHN); Gu Beibei; Zhang Xiaohuan	47.167	47.750	94.917
3rd place, bronze medalist(s)	South Korea (KOR); Jang Yoon-kyeong; Kim Min-jeong	47.250	47.250	94.500
4	Kazakhstan (KAZ); Arna Toktagan; Aliya Karimova	44.167	44.167	88.334
5	Uzbekistan (UZB); Natalya Korneeva; Darya Mojaeva	41.250	42.333	83.583
6	Macau (MAC); Sin Wan I Chan Ian Chi	39.750	39.583	79.333
7	Hong Kong (HKG); Rosita Tse; Wong Man Ting	36.750	37.750	74.500
