= Bowling at the 2002 Asian Games – Men's masters =

Men's masters at the 2002 Asian Games
- Venue: Homeplus Asiad Bowling Alley
- Date: 8–9 October 2002
- Competitors: 16 from 10 nations

Medalists
gold medal	Remy Ong	Singapore
silver medal	Mubarak Al-Merikhi	Qatar
bronze medal	Ahmed Shahin Al-Merikhi	Qatar

The men's masters competition at the 2002 Asian Games in Busan was held on 8 and 9 October 2002 at the Homeplus Asiad Bowling Alley.

The Masters event comprises the top 16 bowlers (maximum two per country) from the all-events category.

== Schedule ==
All times are Korea Standard Time (UTC+09:00)

Date	Time	Event
Tuesday, 8 October 2002	13:00	First block
Wednesday, 9 October 2002	10:00	Second block
Wednesday, 9 October 2002	13:00	2nd/3rd place
Wednesday, 9 October 2002	14:00	1st/2nd place

== Results ==
=== Preliminary ===
Rank	Athlete	Game																Total
Rank	Athlete	1	2	3	4	5	6	7	8	9	10	11	12	13	14	15	16	Total
1	Remy Ong (SIN)	233; 0	213; 0	221; 10	214; 10	258; 10	278; 10	262; 10	227; 0	207; 0	195; 0	226; 10	183; 0	204; 0	259; 10	221; 10	258; 10	3749
2	Mubarak Al-Merikhi (QAT)	247; 10	203; 10	237; 10	195; 0	228; 0	191; 0	269; 10	238; 10	198; 0	204; 0	289; 10	215; 10	236; 10	215; 10	203; 0	173; 0	3631
3	Ahmed Shahin Al-Merikhi (QAT)	169; 0	238; 10	199; 0	243; 0	245; 10	206; 10	222; 10	236; 10	259; 10	182; 0	249; 10	170; 0	267; 10	241; 10	161; 0	234; 10	3621
4	Isao Yamamoto (JPN)	227; 10	234; 10	191; 0	247; 10	192; 0	218; 10	214; 0	234; 10	234; 0	232; 10	181; 0	257; 10	217; 10	215; 10	224; 10	190; 10	3617
5	Byun Ho-jin (KOR)	201; 0	233; 0	212; 10	247; 0	247; 10	206; 10	239; 10	256; 10	184; 0	212; 10	234; 10	243; 10	211; 0	234; 10	167; 10	182; 0	3608
6	Shaker Ali Al-Hassan (UAE)	257; 10	214; 0	200; 10	257; 10	226; 0	203; 0	234; 10	229; 10	174; 0	213; 10	205; 0	188; 0	209; 10	243; 0	240; 10	209; 0	3581
7	Biboy Rivera (PHI)	200; 0	242; 10	226; 10	217; 10	227; 10	201; 0	218; 10	233; 10	226; 10	203; 10	226; 0	201; 0	206; 0	181; 0	222; 10	234; 10	3563
8	Alex Liew (MAS)	207; 0	247; 10	179; 0	198; 0	207; 10	191; 10	270; 10	198; 0	199; 0	249; 10	212; 10	202; 0	235; 0	196; 10	228; 0	231; 10	3529
9	Lee Yu Wen (SIN)	245; 10	186; 0	246; 10	224; 10	189; 0	244; 10	217; 0	225; 0	224; 10	211; 10	204; 10	182; 0	212; 10	191; 10	230; 10	194; 0	3524
10	Chester King (PHI)	226; 10	199; 0	200; 0	257; 10	237; 0	184; 0	218; 0	225; 0	245; 10	194; 0	203; 10	232; 10	206; 10	180; 0	217; 10	213; 0	3506
11	Tsai Ting-yun (TPE)	218; 0	226; 10	207; 0	212; 0	215; 0	204; 0	194; 0	189; 10	228; 10	216; 10	191; 0	201; 10	246; 10	196; 0	193; 0	192; 10	3398
12	Tsai Chun-lin (TPE)	259; 10	164; 0	176; 0	214; 0	247; 10	224; 10	177; 0	222; 0	211; 10	171; 0	237; 10	224; 0	215; 10	195; 0	203; 0	178; 0	3377
13	Yannaphon Larpapharat (THA)	237; 10	215; 10	216; 10	209; 10	159; 0	177; 0	229; 0	234; 10	179; 0	234; 10	231; 0	164; 0	211; 0	182; 10	159; 0	236; 0	3342
14	Jo Nam-yi (KOR)	279; 10	198; 10	149; 0	246; 10	161; 0	187; 10	224; 10	193; 0	179; 0	208; 0	191; 0	213; 10	184; 0	211; 0	200; 0	246; 10	3339
15	Masahiro Hibi (JPN)	203; 0	173; 0	235; 10	155; 0	245; 10	148; 0	212; 0	178; 0	247; 10	196; 0	259; 0	180; 10	202; 0	143; 0	162; 0	242; 10	3230
16	Basel Al-Anzi (KUW)	179; 0	192; 0	168; 0	127; 0	180; 10	202; 0	167; 0	183; 0	211; 10	189; 0	172; 0	258; 10	162; 0	225; 0	213; 10	189; 0	3057

=== Stepladder finals ===
Grand final 2nd/3rd place			Grand final 1st/2nd place
			1	Remy Ong (SIN)	231	213	444
2	Mubarak Al-Merikhi (QAT)	234	2	Mubarak Al-Merikhi (QAT)	211	213	424
3	Ahmed Shahin Al-Merikhi (QAT)	206
