= Bodybuilding at the 2002 Asian Games – Men's 85 kg =

Men's 85 kg at the 2002 Asian Games
- Venue: Busan Citizens' Hall
- Date: 4–6 October 2002
- Competitors: 11 from 10 nations

Medalists
gold medal	Kang Kyung-won	South Korea
silver medal	Sami Al-Haddad	Bahrain
bronze medal	Mohamed Sabah	Bahrain

The men's 85 kilograms event at the 2002 Asian Games was held on October 4 and October 6, 2002 at the Busan Citizens' Hall in Busan, South Korea.

== Schedule ==
All times are Korea Standard Time (UTC+09:00)

Date	Time	Event
Friday, 4 October 2002	13:30	Preliminary round
Sunday, 6 October 2002	16:40	Final round

== Results ==
=== Preliminary round ===
Order	Athlete	Note
1	Chan Yu Kwong (HKG)	
2	Ali Mohammed Abdulla (UAE)	
3	Zhang Huiming (CHN)	
4	Giáp Trí Dũng (VIE)	Pass
5	Sami Al-Haddad (BRN)	Pass
6	Aziz Kulkeyev (KAZ)	
7	Othman Yahya (MAS)	Pass
8	Mohamed Sabah (BRN)	Pass
9	Hsu Chung-huang (TPE)	
10	Hiroshi Inoue (JPN)	Pass
11	Kang Kyung-won (KOR)	Pass

=== Final round ===
Rank	Athlete
1st place, gold medalist(s)	Kang Kyung-won (KOR)
2nd place, silver medalist(s)	Sami Al-Haddad (BRN)
3rd place, bronze medalist(s)	Mohamed Sabah (BRN)
4	Hiroshi Inoue (JPN)
5	Othman Yahya (MAS)
6	Giáp Trí Dũng (VIE)
