= Bodybuilding at the 2002 Asian Games – Men's 80 kg =

Men's 80 kg at the 2002 Asian Games
- Venue: Busan Citizens' Hall
- Date: 3–5 October 2002
- Competitors: 9 from 8 nations

Medalists
gold medal	Lý Đức	Vietnam
silver medal	Liaw Teck Leong	Malaysia
bronze medal	Lee Jin-ho	South Korea

The men's 80 kilograms event at the 2002 Asian Games was held on October 3 and October 5, 2002 at the Busan Citizens' Hall in Busan, South Korea.

== Schedule ==
All times are Korea Standard Time (UTC+09:00)

Date	Time	Event
Thursday, 3 October 2002	13:30	Preliminary round
Saturday, 5 October 2002	16:40	Final round

== Results ==
=== Preliminary round ===
Order	Athlete	Note
1	Igor Ozernoy (KAZ)	
2	Hidetada Yamagishi (JPN)	Pass
3	Mahmood Ali Murad (UAE)	Pass
4	Lee Jin-ho (KOR)	Pass
5	Koichi Aikawa (JPN)	Pass
6	Liaw Teck Leong (MAS)	Pass
7	Fadhel Moussa (BRN)	
8	Lý Đức (VIE)	Pass
9	Liu Xinggang (CHN)	

=== Final round ===
Rank	Athlete
1st place, gold medalist(s)	Lý Đức (VIE)
2nd place, silver medalist(s)	Liaw Teck Leong (MAS)
3rd place, bronze medalist(s)	Lee Jin-ho (KOR)
4	Hidetada Yamagishi (JPN)
5	Koichi Aikawa (JPN)
6	Mahmood Ali Murad (UAE)
