= Bodybuilding at the 2002 Asian Games – Men's 90 kg =

Men's 90 kg at the 2002 Asian Games
- Venue: Busan Citizens' Hall
- Date: 3–5 October 2002
- Competitors: 6 from 5 nations

Medalists
gold medal	Tareq Al-Farsani	Bahrain
silver medal	Mohd Ismail Muhammad	Singapore
bronze medal	Ahmad Al-Saafeen	Qatar

The men's 90 kilograms event at the 2002 Asian Games was held on October 3 and October 5, 2002 at the Busan Citizens' Hall in Busan, South Korea.

== Schedule ==
All times are Korea Standard Time (UTC+09:00)

Date	Time	Event
Thursday, 3 October 2002	15:00	Preliminary round
Saturday, 5 October 2002	18:00	Final round

== Results ==
=== Preliminary round ===
Order	Athlete	Note
1	Kim Myong-hun (KOR)	Pass
2	Ahmad Al-Saafeen (QAT)	Pass
3	Augustine Lee (SIN)	Pass
4	Tareq Al-Farsani (BRN)	Pass
5	Lam Man Shing (HKG)	Pass
6	N. Sanayaima Singh (IND)	
7	Mohd Ismail Muhammad (SIN)	Pass

=== Final round ===
Rank	Athlete
1st place, gold medalist(s)	Tareq Al-Farsani (BRN)
2nd place, silver medalist(s)	Mohd Ismail Muhammad (SIN)
3rd place, bronze medalist(s)	Ahmad Al-Saafeen (QAT)
4	Lam Man Shing (HKG)
5	Kim Myong-hun (KOR)
6	Augustine Lee (SIN)
