= Li Zhen (synchronized swimmer) =

Chinese synchronized swimmer

Personal information
- Born: January 31, 1979 (age 47) Tianjin, China

Sport
- Sport: Synchronised swimming
Medal record
Representing China
Asian Games
| Bronze medal – third place | 2002 Busan | Solo |

Li Zhen (Chinese: 李震, born 31 January 1979) is a Chinese synchronized swimmer who competed in the 2000 Summer Olympics and in the 2004 Summer Olympics and was coached by Suting Zhai.
