= Gu Beibei =

Chinese synchronized swimmer

Personal information
- Born: November 25, 1980 (age 45) Beijing, China

Sport
- Sport: Swimming
Medal record
Representing China
Olympic Games
Bronze medal – third place	2008 Beijing	Team competition
Asian Games
Gold medal – first place	2006 Doha	Women's team
Silver medal – second place	2002 Busan	Women's duet

Gu Beibei (simplified Chinese: 顾贝贝; traditional Chinese: 顧貝貝; pinyin: Gù Bèibèi; born November 25, 1980) is a Chinese synchronized swimmer. She represented China at the 2004 Summer Olympics and the 2008 Summer Olympics.
