= Ai Aoki =

Ai Aoki may refer to:

- Ai Aoki (politician) (born 1965), Japanese politician
- Ai Aoki (synchronised swimmer) (born 1985), Japanese synchronised swimmer
