= Singapore at the 2002 Asian Games =

- IOC code: SIN
- NOC: Singapore National Olympic Council
- Website: www.singaporeolympics.com (in English)

in Busan
- Medals Ranked 13th: Gold 5 Silver 2 Bronze 10 Total 17

Asian Games appearances (overview)
- 1951; 1954; 1958; 1962; 1966; 1970; 1974; 1978; 1982; 1986; 1990; 1994; 1998; 2002; 2006; 2010; 2014; 2018; 2022; 2026

Singapore participated in the 2002 Asian Games held in Busan, South Korea, from September 29 to October 14, 2002. Athletes from Singapore won overall 17 medals (including five golds), and clinched 13th spot in the medal table.

== Medalists ==
Medal	Name	Sport	Event
Gold	Abdul Halim Haron	Bodybuilding	Men's 65 kg
Gold	Simon Chua	Bodybuilding	Men's 75 kg
Gold	Remy Ong	Bowling	Men's singles
Gold	Sam Goh; Lee Yu Wen; Remy Ong	Bowling	Men's trios
Gold	Remy Ong	Bowling	Men's masters
Silver	Ibrahim Sihat	Bodybuilding	Men's 60 kg
Silver	Mohd Ismail Muhammad	Bodybuilding	Men's 90 kg
Bronze	Amir Zainal	Bodybuilding	Men's 65 kg
Bronze	Teo Wee Chin	Sailing	Men's Optimist
Bronze	Tan Wearn Haw; Chung Pei Ming	Sailing	Men's 470
Bronze	Sarah Tan	Sailing	Women's Optimist
Bronze	Toh Liying; Joan Huang	Sailing	Women's 420
Bronze	Joscelin Yeo	Swimming	Women's 100 metre butterfly
Bronze	Nurhisham Adam; Shamsaimon Sabtu; Sharil Abdul Shukor; Eddie Abdul Kadir; Mohd Fami Mohamed	Sepak takraw	Men's regu
Bronze	Li Jiawei	Table tennis	Women's singles
Bronze	Li Jiawei; Jing Junhong; Zhang Xueling; Tan Paey Fern	Table tennis	Women's team
Bronze	Jessie Liew	Wushu	Women's taijiquan
