= Bodybuilding at the 2005 World Games – Men's 85 kg =

Bodybuilding men's 85 kg at the World Games
- Venue: TAM Theatre, Duisburg, Germany
- Date: 16–17 July 2005
- Competitors: 5 from 5 nations

Medalists
1st place, gold medalist(s)		Kamal Abdulsalam	Qatar
2nd place, silver medalist(s)		Tareq Al-Farsani	Bahrain
3rd place, bronze medalist(s)		Frank Schramm	Germany

The men's 85 kg event in bodybuilding at the 2005 World Games in Duisburg was played from 16 to 17 July. The bodybuilding competition took place in TAM Theatre.

== Competition format ==
A total of 5 athletes entered the competition. All of them advanced to the final rounds. Scores from round 1 doesn't count in final rounds.

== Results ==
Rank	Athlete	Nation	Round 1	Round 2	Round 3	Score
1st place, gold medalist(s)	Kamal Abdulsalam	Qatar	5	5	5	10
2nd place, silver medalist(s)	Tareq Al-Farsani	Bahrain	13	11	13	24
3rd place, bronze medalist(s)	Frank Schramm	Germany	15	19	16	35
4	Semion Berkovic	Lithuania	18	18	19	37
	Lee Jin-ho	South Korea	DSQ			
