= Tareq Al-Farsani =

Bahraini bodybuilder (born 1972)

Personal information
- Born: January 1, 1975 (age 51) Manama, Bahrain

Sport
- Country: Bahrain
- Sport: Bodybuilding
Achievements and titles
Bodybuilding
Representing Bahrain
World Games
Silver medal – second place	Duisburg	85 kg
Asian Games
Gold medal – first place	2002 Busan	90 kg
Gold medal – first place	2006 Doha	90+ kg

Tariq Jaafar Al-Farsani (born in Manama, Bahrain, 1972) is a Bahraini bodybuilder. In April 2011 he was arrested after allegedly taking part in pro-democracy reform protests in Bahrain in February 2011. He was detained indefinitely without charge. As of July 2011 his fate is unclear.

== International competitions ==
- 1998 Asian Amateur Championships — IFBB, Light-Heavyweight, Did not place
- 2002 Asian Amateur Championships — IFBB, Light-Heavyweight, 1st
- 2002 Asian Games, Light-Heavyweight, 1st
- 2004 Asian Amateur Championships — IFBB, Light-Heavyweight, 1st
- 2006 Asian Games, Heavyweight, 1st
- 2007 World Amateur Championships — IFBB, Light-Heavyweight, Disqualified
- 2008 World Bodybuilding Championships (Manama, Bahrain) — Silver medallist, 90 kg category

== 2011 detention ==
On 16 April 2011 Tareq Al-Farsani was reported to be one of the international athletes and other sports personalities arrested by the Bahraini authorities following the pro-democracy reform protests. According to Nabeel Rajab of the Bahrain Centre for Human Rights (BCHR), Tareq Al-Farsani's family were not informed of his whereabouts and were afraid that he may have been tortured. Al-Farsani's sister Faiza was also arrested.

On 29 June 2011 the Bahrain News Agency reported that the Bahrain Defence Force military public prosecutor had announced that "defendants involved at medical and sport crimes" had been released, but trials would continue in accordance with Bahraini legal procedures.
