= Bodybuilding at the 2006 Asian Games – Men's +90 kg =

Men's +90 kg at the 2006 Asian Games
- Venue: Al-Dana Banquet Hall
- Date: 9 December 2006
- Competitors: 10 from 8 nations

Medalists
gold medal	Tareq Al-Farsani	Bahrain
silver medal	Jassim Abdulla	Qatar
bronze medal	Ahmad Al-Saafeen	Jordan

The men's +90 kilograms event at the 2006 Asian Games was held on December 9, 2006 at the Al-Dana Banquet Hall in Doha, Qatar.

== Schedule ==
All times are Arabia Standard Time (UTC+03:00)

Date	Time	Event
Saturday, 9 December 2006	12:15	Prejudging round
Saturday, 9 December 2006	18:05	Final round

== Results ==
=== Prejudging round ===
Rank	Athlete	Score
1	Tareq Al-Farsani (BRN)	5
2	Jassim Abdulla (QAT)	11
3	Ahmad Al-Saafeen (JOR)	15
4	Yang Sang-hun (KOR)	19
5	Mohamed Merza (BRN)	22
6	Fereydoun Haghi (IRI)	30
7	Mohsen Ghorannevis (IRI)	36
8	Hsu Chia-hao (TPE)	39
9	Fadi Zaazaa (LIB)	46
DQ	Mohammadullah Mohammadyar (AFG)	~~48~~

- Mohammadullah Mohammadyar of Afghanistan originally finished 10th, but was disqualified.

=== Final round ===
Rank	Athlete	Prej.	Final	Total
1st place, gold medalist(s)	Tareq Al-Farsani (BRN)	5	5	10
2nd place, silver medalist(s)	Jassim Abdulla (QAT)	11	12	23
3rd place, bronze medalist(s)	Ahmad Al-Saafeen (JOR)	15	13	28
4	Yang Sang-hun (KOR)	19	20	39
5	Mohamed Merza (BRN)	22	23	45
