= Simon Chua Ling Fung =

Singaporean bodybuilder

Medal record

Men's bodybuilding

Representing Singapore

Asian Games
Gold medal – first place	2002 Busan	75 kg
Gold medal – first place	2006 Doha	70 kg

Chua Ling Fung Simon is a bodybuilder from Singapore who started off as an instructor in a gymnasium before taking up the sport full-time. In 1991, he came in third in his first participation in a national event at the under-21 National Championship (Lightweight) competition, before going international and representing Singapore at the Pro-Am Classic held in Hong Kong in 1995 where he came in ninth position.

In 1997, he took his first gold medal in the 1997 Southeast Asian Games, before earning more titles in the 2000 Southeast Asian Championship and the 2002 Commonwealth Championship. A fever just a week before departure to Busan for the 2002 Asian Games nearly cost him a medal chance, but he proceeded anyway and came back with a gold medal in the welterweight category (75 kg), earning one of Singapore's first gold medals in the sport alongside Abdul Halim bin Haron.

He earned another gold medal in the 2006 Asian Games at Doha.
