= Pakistan at the 2002 Asian Games =

- IOC code: PAK
- NOC: Pakistan Olympic Association

in Busan
- Medals Ranked 23rd: Gold 1 Silver 6 Bronze 6 Total 13

Asian Games appearances (overview)
- 1954; 1958; 1962; 1966; 1970; 1974; 1978; 1982; 1986; 1990; 1994; 1998; 2002; 2006; 2010; 2014; 2018; 2022; 2026

Pakistan participated in the 2002 Asian Games in Busan, South Korea held from September 29 to October 14, 2002. It won 1 gold, 6 silver and 6 bronze medals.

== Competitors ==
Sport	Men	Women	Total
Athletics	2	0	2
Cue sports	7	0	7
Boxing	10	0	10
Cycling	1	0	1
Field hockey	18	0	18
Football	20	0	20
Gymnastics	2	0	2
Judo	1	0	1
Kabaddi	9	0	9
Karate	2	0	2
Rowing	5	0	5
Sailing	3	2	5
Shooting	8	2	10
Sport climbing	3	2	5
Squash	4	4	8
Swimming	4	3	7
Table tennis	2	3	5
Taekwondo	4	1	5
Tennis	2	2	4
Volleyball	12	0	12
Weightlifting	3	0	3
Wrestling	4	0	4
Wushu	2	2	4
Total	136	53	189

== Medal table ==
Sport	Gold	Silver	Bronze	Total
Boxing	1	4	1	6
Kabaddi	0	0	1	1
Golf	1	0	0	1
Shooting	0	2	0	2
Sailing	0	1	2	3
Hockey	0	1	0	1
Taekwondo	0	0	1	1
Equestrian	0	0	1	1
Rowing	0	0	1	1
Wrestling	0	0	1	1
Boxing	1	4	1	5
Total	11	12	13	36

== Athletics ==
=== Men ===
Track Events

Athletes	Event	Heats		Final	
Athletes	Event	Result	Rank	Result	Rank
Abdul Rashid	110 m hurdles	DNS		—N/a	Did not Advance
Allah Ditta	400 m hurdles	50.77	2 Q	51.22	7

== Bodybuilding ==
Athlete	Event	Preliminary round		Final	
Athlete	Event	Result	Rank	Result	Rank
Khalil Ali	65 kg	DNP		—N/a	Did not Advance
Javed Akhter	75 kg	DNP		—N/a	Did not Advance

== Boxing ==
Athlete	Event	Round of 32	Round of 16	Quarterfinals	Semifinals	Final	Rank
Athlete	Event	Opposition Result	Opposition Result	Opposition Result	Opposition Result	Opposition Result	Rank
Imran Hafeez	48 kg	—N/a	Mohammed Ali Qamar (IND); L RSC	Did not Advance			
Nauman Karim	Men's 51 kg	—N/a	Berik Serikbayev (KAZ); W 14–9	Violito Payla (PHI); W 31–19	Kim Tae-kyu (KOR); W 23–14	Somjit Jongjohor (THA); L 7–26	2nd
Abid Ali	Men's 54 kg	—N/a	Talaibek Kadyraliev (KGZ); L 11–25	Did not Advance			
Mehrullah Lassi	57 kg	—N/a	Uranchimegiin Mönkh-Erdene (MGL); W RSCO	Chung Chun-an (TPE); W RSCO	Chen Tongzhou (CHN); W 30–18	Galib Jafarov (KAZ); W 26–21	1st
Mazhar Hussain	60 kg	—N/a	Abyl Tileberdi Uulu (KGZ); L RSCH	Did not Advance			
Asghar Ali Shah	63.5 kg	—N/a	Yukio Fukaishi (JPN); W 19–17	Romeo Brin (PHI); W 31–15	Shin Myung-hoon (KOR); W 23–13	Nurzhan Karimzhanov (KAZ); L 15–19	2nd
Kashif Mumtaz	71 kg	—N/a	Christopher Camat (PHI); W 18–11	Suriya Prasathinphimai (THA); L RSCH	Did not Advance		
Ahmed Ali Khan	75 kg	—N/a	Bye	Maraon Golez (PHI); W KO	Moon Young-seung (KOR); W RSCO	Utkirbek Haydarov (UZB); L RSCO	2nd
Shaukat Ali	91 kg	—N/a	—N/a	Syrgak Kazakbaev (KGZ); W 33–11	Nasser Al-Shami (SYR); W RSCO	Sergey Mihaylov (UZB); L RSCO	2nd
Muzaffar Iqbal Mirza	+91 kg	—N/a	Bye	Ruslan Avasov (KGZ); W 24–8	Rustam Saidov (UZB); L RSCI	Did not Advance	3rd

== Cycling ==
=== Men ===
Road

Athletes	Event	Final	
Athletes	Event	Result	Rank
Haroon Rashid	Individual time trial	1:11:19.29	14

== Field hockey ==
Summary

Key:

- A.E.T – After extra time.
- P – Match decided by penalty-shootout.

Team	Event	Group Stage				Semifinal	Final / BM/ Classification	
Team	Event	Opposition Score	Opposition Score	Opposition Score	Rank	Opposition Score	Opposition Score	Rank
Pakistan men's	Men's tournament	China; W 8–3	Bangladesh; W 9–0	Malaysia; W 6–1	1	India; L 3–4	Malaysia; L 1–1 (4–2p); A.E.T	4th

=== Men's tournament ===
Team	Pld	W	D	L	GF	GA	GD	Pts
Pakistan	3	3	0	0	23	4	+19	9
Malaysia	3	2	0	1	10	9	+1	6
China	3	1	0	2	8	13	−5	3
Bangladesh	3	0	0	3	3	18	−15	0

30 September
15:30

Pakistan	8–3	China

Gangseo Hockey Stadium, Busan

4 October
12:30

Bangladesh	0–9	Pakistan

Gangseo Hockey Stadium, Busan

6 October
12:30

Malaysia	1–6	Pakistan

Gangseo Hockey Stadium, Busan

=== Semifinals ===
10 October
14:00

Pakistan	3–4	India
Abbas 10', 26'; Sh. Muhammad 63'	Report	Pillay 6', 21'; D. Singh 41'; GA Singh 67'

Gangseo Hockey Stadium, Busan
Umpires:
Murray Grime (AUS)

=== 3rd place match ===
12 October
12:00

Malaysia	1–1 (a.e.t.)	Pakistan
Penalties
	4–2

Gangseo Hockey Stadium, Busan

== Football ==
Team	Event	Group Stage				Quarterfinal	Semifinal	Final / BM/ Classification	
Team	Event	Opposition Score	Opposition Score	Opposition Score	Rank	Opposition Score	Opposition Score	Opposition Score	Rank
Pakistan men's	Men's tournament	Kuwait; L 0–6	North Korea; L 0–5	Hong Kong; L 0–3	4	Did not Advance			23rd

=== Men's tournament ===
Squad

Coach: (Slovakia) Joseph Herel

No.	Pos.	Player	Date of birth (age)	Club
1	GK	Jaffar Khan	20 March 1981 (aged 21)	(Pakistan Football Federation) Army
2	DF	Ashfaq Ahmed	3 January 1983 (aged 19)	(Pakistan Football Federation) ABL
3	DF	Amir Shahzad	7 February 1982 (aged 20)	(Pakistan Football Federation) Army
4	DF	Tanveer Ahmed	15 April 1976 (aged 26)	(Pakistan Football Federation) WAPDA
5	DF	Naseer Ahmed	12 April 1978 (aged 24)	(Pakistan Football Federation) KPT
6	MF	Mehmood Khan	6 January 1983 (aged 19)	(Pakistan Football Federation) Baloch
7	FW	Gohar Zaman	15 December 1979 (aged 22)	(Pakistan Football Federation) ABL
8	MF	Adeel Ahmed	25 November 1983 (aged 18)	(Pakistan Football Federation) PTCL
9	FW	Zulfiqar Ali Shah	25 November 1980 (aged 21)	(Pakistan Football Federation) ABL
10	MF	Muhammad Essa	20 November 1983 (aged 18)	(Pakistan Football Federation) PTCL
11	FW	Attique-ur-Rehman	5 May 1984 (aged 18)	(Pakistan Football Federation) KRL
13	FW	Zaheer Abbas		(Pakistan Football Federation) WAPDA
15	DF	Haroon Yousaf	10 November 1973 (aged 28)	(Pakistan Football Federation) ABL
16	MF	Nomi Martin Gill	9 September 1983 (aged 19)	(Pakistan Football Federation) Navy
17	MF	Arif Mehmood	26 June 1983 (aged 19)	(Pakistan Football Federation) Army
19	GK	Asad Ullah Tariq		(Pakistan Football Federation) WAPDA
20	GK	Muhammad Shahzad	25 August 1983 (aged 19)	(Pakistan Football Federation) HBL

Group stage

Pos	Team	Pld	W	D	L	GF	GA	GD	Pts
1	Kuwait	3	3	0	0	9	0	+9	9
2	North Korea	3	2	0	1	7	3	+4	6
3	Hong Kong	3	1	0	2	4	3	+1	3
4	Pakistan	3	0	0	3	0	14	−14	0

Source: RSSSF
28 September
19:03

Kuwait	6–0	Pakistan
Abdullah 2', 54', 76'; Abdulqoddus 26'; Nahar 42'; Al-Tayyar 65'

Gudeok Stadium, Busan

1 October
19:03

North Korea	5–0	Pakistan
Jon Chol 12', 72'; Rim Kun-u 68'; Kim Yong-su 71', 85'

Yangsan Stadium, Yangsan

5 October
19:03

Pakistan	0–3	Hong Kong
		Chan Yiu Lun 49'; Lo Chi Kwan 78'; Law Chun Bong 90'

Yangsan Stadium, Yangsan

== Gymnastics ==
=== Men's tournament ===
Artistic

Athletes	Event	Qualification							Rank	Final							Rank
Athletes	Event	Floor	Pommel horse	Rings	Vault	Parallel bars	Horizontal bars	Total	Rank	Floor	Pommel horse	Rings	Vault	Parallel bars	Horizontal bars	Total	Rank
Toqeer Ahmed	Individual all-around	6.600	3.350	5.700	8.500	6.600	5.600	36.350	38	7.505	1.150	6.150	8.450	6.400	5.650	34.850	19th
Muhammad Akber	Individual all-around	5.900	3.350	5.950	7.800	6.800	5.350	35.150	40	6.550	3.250	6.950	7.850	6.750	5.450	36.800	18th

== Judo ==
Main round

Athlete	Event	Round 1	Round 2	Round 3	Semifinal	Final
Athlete	Event	Opposition Result	Opposition Result	Opposition Result	Opposition Result	Opposition Result
Muhammad Zeeshan Butt	66 kg	Bye	Mohan Sunuwar (NEP); W 1000–0001	Kim Hyung-ju (KOR); L 0000–1011	Did not Advance	

Repechage

Athlete	Event	Round 1	Round 2	Round 3	Semifinal	Final
Athlete	Event	Opposition Result	Opposition Result	Opposition Result	Opposition Result	Opposition Result
Muhammad Zeeshan Butt	66 kg	Bye	Chen Chih-hung (TPE); L 0100–1100	Did not Advance		

== Kabaddi ==
Team	Event	Group Stage					Final / BM/ Classification
Team	Event	Opposition Score	Opposition Score	Opposition Score	Opposition Score	Opposition Score	Rank
Pakistan	Kabaddi at the 2002 Asian Games	Bangladesh; L 44–10 (13–1)	Sri Lanka; W 20–6 (6–2)	Japan; W 21–12 (3–0)	Malaysia; W 29–7 (11–4)	India; L 7–37 (4–23)	3rd

Squad

Pakistan
- Muhammad Mansha
- Tariq Hussain
- Zubair Ahmed
- Muhammad Akram Shakar
- Mukhtar Ahmed
- Muhammad Latif
- Badshah Gul
- Muhammad Saleem
- Noor Akbar
- Muhammad Akram

== Results ==
All times are Korea Standard Time (UTC+09:00)

Pos	Team	Pld	W	D	L	PF	PA	PD	Pts
1	India	5	5	0	0	224	84	+140	10
2	Bangladesh	5	3	0	2	174	91	+83	6 (Note: Match points difference against the teams which scored 25% or more of the league points: BAN +4, PAK −55.)
3	Pakistan	5	3	0	2	87	106	−19	6
4	Japan	5	2	0	3	83	107	−24	4
5	Malaysia	5	1	0	4	65	145	−80	2 (Note: Match points difference against the teams which scored 25% or more of the league points: MAS −78, SRI −102.)
6	Sri Lanka	5	1	0	4	64	164	−100	2

Source: Report
Notes:

4 October; 14:00	Bangladesh	44–10	Pakistan	Tongmyong University, Busan
4 October; 14:00		(13–1)		Tongmyong University, Busan

5 October; 10:00	Pakistan	20–6	Sri Lanka	Tongmyong University, Busan
5 October; 10:00		(6–2)		Tongmyong University, Busan

5 October; 14:00	Japan	12–21	Pakistan	Tongmyong University, Busan
5 October; 14:00		(0–3)		Tongmyong University, Busan

6 October; 16:00	Malaysia	7–29	Pakistan	Tongmyong University, Busan
6 October; 16:00		(4–11)		Tongmyong University, Busan

7 October; 14:00	India	37–7	Pakistan	Tongmyong University, Busan
7 October; 14:00		(23–4)		Tongmyong University, Busan

== Karate ==
=== Men's tournament ===
Main round

Athlete	Event	Preliminary round	Quarterfinal	Semifinal	Final
Athlete	Event	Result	Result	Result	Result
Farman Ahmed	Kata	Bye	Antonio de Araújo (TMP); W 3–0	Wong Pak Cheong (MAC); L 0–3	Did not Advance
Farman Ahmed	Kumite 75 kg	Che Yong-jung (PRK); W 7–1	Wahid Ahmad Joya (AFG); W DQ	Ahmad Muneer (KUW); L 0–8	Did not Advance

Repechage
Main round

Athlete	Event	Final
Athlete	Event	Result
Farman Ahmed	Kata	Rayappan Jebamalai Edward (SRI); L 0–3
Farman Ahmed	Kumite 75 kg	Tong Kit Siong (BRU); L 5–9
