= Abdul Halim Haron =

Singaporean bodybuilder

Medal record

Men's bodybuilding

Representing Singapore

Asian Games
Gold medal – first place	2002 Busan	65 kg

Abdul Halim bin Haron is bodybuilder from Singapore who was inducted into the Singapore Sports Council's Hall of Fame for his impressive performance over the years. Starting his professional career in the welterweight category in the late 1990s, he won a bronze medal in the Asian Championship in 2000, and came out tops in the Singaporean national competitions a year later.

== Career ==
In 1999, Halim was the national welterweight champion. He was fifth in the Mr Asia contest held at Taiwan. He would also represent Singapore in the lightweight category at the World Amateur Bodybuilding Championships held at Slovakia.

As there is a higher chance of winning medals in the lighter categories, he was asked to switch to the lower weight categories, a request which involved having to shed over 10 kilogrammes over just two years. His efforts allowed him to compete in the Busan 2002 Asian Games in the bantamweight category, and earned him a gold medal.

In 2003, Halim won the lightweight category of the bodybuilding contest at the 2003 SEA Games.
