= Lebanon at the 2002 Asian Games =

- IOC code: LIB
- NOC: Lebanese Olympic Committee

in Busan
- Medals Ranked 27th: Gold 1 Silver 0 Bronze 0 Total 1

Asian Games appearances (overview)
- 1978; 1982; 1986; 1990; 1994; 1998; 2002; 2006; 2010; 2014; 2018; 2022; 2026

Lebanon participated in the 2002 Asian Games held in Busan, South Korea, from September 29 to October 14, 2002. Athletes from Lebanon won only one gold, and clinched 27th spot in the medal table.
