= Saudi Arabia at the 2002 Asian Games =

- IOC code: KSA
- NOC: Saudi Arabian Olympic Committee

in Busan
- Medals Ranked 11th: Gold 7 Silver 1 Bronze 1 Total 9

Asian Games appearances (overview)
- 1978; 1982; 1986; 1990; 1994; 1998; 2002; 2006; 2010; 2014; 2018; 2022; 2026

Saudi Arabia participated in the 2002 Asian Games held in Busan, South Korea, from September 29 to October 14, 2002. Athletes from Saudi Arabia won overall nine medals (including seven golds), and clinched eleventh spot in the medal table.

== Medalists ==
Medal	Name	Sport	Event
Gold	Jamal Al-Saffar	Sport of athletics	100 metres
Gold	Mukhlid Al-Otaibi	Sport of athletics	5000 metres
Gold	Mukhlid Al-Otaibi	Sport of athletics	10,000 metres
Gold	Ismail Al-Sabiani	Sport of athletics	400 metres hurdles
Gold	Hamed Al-Bishi Ismail Al-Sabiani Mohammed Al-Salhi Hamdan Al-Bishi	Sport of athletics	4 × 400 metres relay
Gold	Hussein Al-Sabee	Sport of athletics	Long jump
Gold	Salem Al-Ahmadi	Sport of athletics	Triple jump
Silver	Hamdan Al-Bishi	Sport of athletics	400 metres
Bronze	Ghali Al-Matrafi	Taekwondo	–62 kg
