= Remy Ong =

Singaporean bowler (born 1978)

Medal record

Men's ten-pin bowling

Representing Singapore

World Tenpin Bowling Championships
Gold medal – first place	2006 Busan	Singles
Gold medal – first place	2006 Busan	All Events

Asian Games
Gold medal – first place	2002 Busan	Trios
Gold medal – first place	2002 Busan	Singles
Gold medal – first place	2002 Busan	Masters
Silver medal – second place	2006 Doha	Trios
Silver medal – second place	2006 Doha	Masters
Silver medal – second place	2010 Guangzhou	Doubles

Remy Ong (Chinese: 王雷明; pinyin: Wáng Léi Míng; Pe̍h-ōe-jī: Ông Luî-bîng; born 22 November 1978) is a Singaporean bowler and former world champion.

Remy made his name in the 2002 Asian Games at Busan as the captain for the men's team when he became the nation's only second male multiple-gold medalist in the competition's 51-year history, winning three gold medals. He developed into a national bowler at the age of 16. Remy won his first perfect game at the ATBC Championships in 1998 at the age of 20. The bowler also achieved number one status for bowling in Asia and fifth in the world in 2002 and came close to becoming the champion of the 38th AMF World Cup. In the same year, he was voted sportsman of the year. A year later, he was given the Singapore Youth Award for 2003. His crowning achievement to date is winning the singles title in the WTBA World Tenpin Bowling Championships at Busan, South Korea in 2006.

== See also ==
- List of Singapore world champions in sports
