= Bahrain at the 2002 Asian Games =

- IOC code: BRN
- NOC: Bahrain Olympic Committee

in Busan
- Competitors: 84 in 11 sports
- Medals Ranked 19th: Gold 3 Silver 2 Bronze 2 Total 7

Asian Games appearances (overview)
- 1974; 1978; 1982; 1986; 1990; 1994; 1998; 2002; 2006; 2010; 2014; 2018; 2022; 2026

Athletes from Bahrain participated in the 2002 Asian Games held in Busan, South Korea, from September 29 to October 14, 2002. They won seven medals (including three golds), and clinched 19th spot in the medal table.

== Number of athletes ==
Sport	Athlete number
Athletics	7
Beach volleyball	4
Bodybuilding	6
Bowling	6
Football	20
Golf	4
Handball	16
Modern pentathlon	4
Shooting	6
Taekwondo	8
Weightlifting	3
Total	84
