= Vietnam at the 2002 Asian Games =

- IOC code: VIE
- NOC: Vietnam Olympic Committee
- Website: www.voc.org.vn (in Vietnamese and English)

in Busan
- Medals Ranked 15th: Gold 4 Silver 7 Bronze 7 Total 18

Asian Games appearances (overview)
- 1954; 1958; 1962; 1966; 1970; 1974; 1978; 1982; 1986; 1990; 1994; 1998; 2002; 2006; 2010; 2014; 2018; 2022; 2026

Vietnam participated in the 2002 Asian Games held in Busan, South Korea, from September 29 to October 14, 2002. Athletes from Vietnam won overall 18 medals (including four golds), and clinched 15th spot in the medal table.
