= Macau at the 2002 Asian Games =

- IOC code: MAC
- NOC: Macau Sports and Olympic Committee

in Busan
- Medals Ranked 29th: Gold 0 Silver 2 Bronze 2 Total 4

Asian Games appearances (overview)
- 1990; 1994; 1998; 2002; 2006; 2010; 2014; 2018; 2022; 2026

Macau participated in the 2002 Asian Games held in Busan, South Korea, from September 29 to October 14, 2002. Athletes from Macau won overall four medals, and clinched 29th spot in the medal table.
