= Myanmar at the 2002 Asian Games =

- IOC code: MYA
- NOC: Myanmar Olympic Committee

in Busan
- Medals Ranked 23rd: Gold 1 Silver 5 Bronze 6 Total 12

Asian Games appearances (overview)
- 1951; 1954; 1958; 1962; 1966; 1970; 1974; 1978; 1982; 1986; 1990; 1994; 1998; 2002; 2006; 2010; 2014; 2018; 2022; 2026

Myanmar participated in the 2002 Asian Games held in Busan, South Korea, from 29 September to 14 October 2002. Athletes from Myanmar won twelve medals in total (including one gold), finishing 23rd in the overall medal table.
