= Philippines at the 2002 Asian Games =

- IOC code: PHI
- NOC: Philippine Olympic Committee
- Website: www.olympic.ph (in English)

in Busan
- Medals Ranked 18th: Gold 3 Silver 7 Bronze 16 Total 26

Asian Games appearances (overview)
- 1951; 1954; 1958; 1962; 1966; 1970; 1974; 1978; 1982; 1986; 1990; 1994; 1998; 2002; 2006; 2010; 2014; 2018; 2022; 2026

The Philippines participated in the 2002 Asian Games held in Busan, South Korea from September 29 to October 14, 2002. Ranked 18th with 3 gold medals, 7 silver medals and 16 bronze medals with a total of 26 over-all medals.

== Asian Games performance ==
Equestrian Mikaela Cojuangco Jaworski won an individual gold medal. Bowlers Paeng Nepomuceno and RJ Bautista won the gold in Doubles and Billiards Francisco Bustamante and Antonio Lining won the 9-Pool Doubles.

== Medalists ==
The following Philippine competitors won medals at the Games.

=== Gold ===
No.	Medal	Name	Sport	Event
1	Gold	Paeng Nepomuceno; R. J. Bautista	Bowling	Men's Doubles
2	Gold	Francisco Bustamante; Antonio Lining	Cue sports	9-ball Doubles
3	Gold	Mikee Cojuangco-Jaworski	Equestrian	Individual Jumping

=== Silver ===
No.	Medal	Name	Sport	Event
1	Silver	Christian Jan Suarez; Chester King; Leonardo Rey	Bowling	Men's Trios
2	Silver	Liza del Rosario; Irene Garcia; Liza Clutario; Josephine Canare; Cecilia Yap; Kathleen Ann Lopez	Bowling	Women's Team
3	Silver	Harry Tañamor	Boxing	Light flyweight 48kg
4	Silver	Warren Kiamco	Cue sports	9-ball Singles
5	Silver	Danielle Cojuangco; Mikee Cojuangco-Jaworski; Toni Leviste; Michelle Barrera	Equestrian	Team Jumping
6	Silver	Marvin Sicomen	Wushu	Men's Sanda 52kg
7	Silver	Rexel Nganhayna	Wushu	Men's Sanda 56kg

=== Bronze ===
No.	Medal	Name	Sport	Event
1	Bronze	Liza Clutario	Bowling	Women's Singles
2	Bronze	Efren Reyes	Cue sports	8-ball Singles
3	Bronze	Heidi Chua; Ria Quiazon; Carmelette Villaroman	Golf	Women's Team
4	Bronze	Cherli Tugday	Karate	Women's Kata
5	Bronze	Gretchen Malalad	Karate	Women's Kumite -60kg
6	Bronze	Alvin Amposta; Nestor Cordova	Rowing	Men's Lightweight Double Sculls
7	Bronze	Jethro Dionisio	Shooting	Men's Trap
8	Bronze	Eric Ang; Jethro Dionisio; Jaime Recio	Shooting	Men's Trap Team
9	Bronze	Tshomlee Go	Taekwondo	Men's Flyweight -58kg
10	Bronze	Dindo Simpao	Taekwondo	Men's Middleweight -84kg
11	Bronze	Daleen Cordero	Taekwondo	Women's Flyweight -51kg
12	Bronze	Veronica Domingo	Taekwondo	Women's Welterweight -67kg
13	Bronze	Sally Solis	Taekwondo	Women's Middleweight -72kg
14	Bronze	Arvin Ting	Wushu	Men's Taolu - Changquan
15	Bronze	Bobby Co	Wushu	Men's Taolu - Taijiquan
16	Bronze	Eduard Folayang	Wushu	Men's Sanda 65kg

=== Multiple ===
Name	Sport	Gold	Silver	Bronze	Total
Mikee Cojuangco-Jaworski	Equestrian	1	1	0	2
Liza Clutario	Bowling	0	1	1	2
Jethro Dionisio	Shooting	0	0	2	2

== Medal summary ==
=== Medal by sports ===
Sport	Gold	Silver	Bronze	Total
Bowling	1	2	1	4
Cue sports	1	1	1	3
Equestrian	1	1	0	2
Wushu	0	2	3	5
Boxing	0	1	0	1
Taekwondo	0	0	5	5
Karate	0	0	2	2
Shooting	0	0	2	2
Golf	0	0	1	1
Rowing	0	0	1	1
Totals (10 entries)	3	7	16	26
