= Hong Kong at the 2002 Asian Games =

- IOC code: HKG
- NOC: Sports Federation and Olympic Committee of Hong Kong, China

in Busan
- Medals Ranked 16th: Gold 4 Silver 6 Bronze 11 Total 21

Asian Games appearances (overview)
- 1954; 1958; 1962; 1966; 1970; 1974; 1978; 1982; 1986; 1990; 1994; 1998; 2002; 2006; 2010; 2014; 2018; 2022; 2026

Hong Kong participated in the 2002 Asian Games held in Busan, South Korea, from September 29 to October 14, 2002. Athletes from Hong Kong won overall 21 medals (including four golds), and clinched 16th spot in the medal table.
