= South Korea at the 2002 Asian Games =

- IOC code: KOR
- NOC: Korean Olympic Committee

in Busan
- Competitors: 769 in 36 sports
- Flag bearer: Hwangbo Sung-il
- Officials: 238
- Medals Ranked 2nd: Gold 96 Silver 80 Bronze 84 Total 260

Asian Games appearances (overview)
- 1954; 1958; 1962; 1966; 1970; 1974; 1978; 1982; 1986; 1990; 1994; 1998; 2002; 2006; 2010; 2014; 2018; 2022; 2026

South Korea (officially the Republic of Korea) was the host nation of the 2002 Asian Games held in Busan from September 29 to October 14, 2002. South Korea was represented by the Korean Olympic Committee, and the South Korean delegation was the largest in this edition of the Asian Games. The delegation of 1,008 people included 770 competitors – 460 men, 310 women – and 238 officials (217 men and 21 women). North Korea competed for the first time in an international sporting event hosted by South Korea. Both nations marched together at the opening ceremony with a Korean Unification Flag depicting the Korean Peninsula as United Korea.

Competitors from the South Korea led the bronze medal count with 84 in the general medal table. South Korea also won 96 gold medals, 80 silver medals and a total of 260 medals, finishing second on the medal table.

== Background ==
South Korea hosted the Asian Games for the second time after the 1986 Asian Games in Seoul. 2002 Asian Games (officially known as the 14th Asian Games) came out to be politically successful for the host nation as this was the first time in the history that North Korea competed in an international sporting event hosted by their southern neighbor.

National Olympic Committee of South Korea, Korean Olympic Committee, selected a delegation consisted of 770 athletes (460 men and 310 women) and 238 officials (217 men and 21 women). This was the largest delegation of any nation in the Games, comparing with the second largest delegation of Japan which included 659 athletes and 329 officials.

== Medal summary ==
Korean contingents earned total 260 medals in 38 sports and disciplines. In the national sport Taekwondo, Korean athletes won most medals (twelve gold, three silver and a bronze).

=== Medals by discipline ===
Sport	Gold	Silver	Bronze	Total
Taekwondo	12	3	1	16
Soft tennis	7	3	2	12
Shooting	6	12	11	29
Fencing	6	6	3	15
Wrestling	6	6	0	12
Sailing	6	2	2	10
Cycling	5	2	6	13
Judo	4	5	5	14
Badminton	4	2	3	9
Modern pentathlon	4	1	1	6
Boxing	3	2	5	10
Gymnastics	3	2	4	9
Bowling	3	2	2	7
Athletics	3	2	1	6
Bodybuilding	3	0	2	5
Equestrian	2	4	0	6
Table tennis	2	3	3	8
Archery	2	1	2	5
Handball	2	0	0	2
Rugby union	2	0	0	2
Tennis	1	3	3	7
Swimming	1	2	8	11
Golf	1	2	2	5
Cue sports	1	2	1	4
Weightlifting	1	1	4	6
Basketball	1	1	0	2
Hockey	1	1	0	2
Volleyball	1	1	0	2
Wushu	1	1	0	2
Sepaktakraw	1	0	3	4
Baseball	1	0	0	1
Canoeing	0	5	2	7
Diving	0	2	1	3
Synchronized swimming	0	1	1	2
Rowing	0	0	3	3
Football	0	0	1	1
Karate	0	0	1	1
Squash	0	0	1	1
Totals (38 entries)	96	80	84	260

== See also ==
- South Korea at the 2004 Summer Olympics
