= 2002 Asian Games =

Multi-sport event in Busan, South Korea

XIV Asian Games
- Host city: Busan, South Korea
- Motto: New Vision, New Asia (Korean: 새로운 비전, 새로운 아시아; RR: saeroun bijeon, saeroun asia)
- Nations: 44
- Athletes: 7,711
- Events: 419 in 38 sports
- Opening: 29 September 2002
- Closing: 14 October 2002
- Opened by: Kim Dae-jung; President of South Korea
- Closed by: Samih Moudallal; Vice President of the Olympic Council of Asia
- Athlete's Oath: Moon Dae-sung, Ryu Ji-hye
- Torch lighter: Ha Hyung-joo, Kye Sun-hui
- Main venue: Busan Asiad Main Stadium
- Website: busanasiangames.org (archived)

Summer

Winter

The 2002 Asian Games, (Note: Korean: 2002년 아시아 경기대회, 2002-nyeon Asia gyeonggi daehoe) officially known as the XIV Asian Games (Note: Korean: 제14회 아시아 경기대회, Je sipsa hoe Asia gyeonggi daehoe) and also known as Busan 2002 (부산2002), were an international multi-sport event held in Busan, South Korea from 29 September to 14 October 2002. Due to schedule impediments the football tournament started two days before the opening ceremony.

Busan is the second city in South Korea, after Seoul in 1986, to host the Games. A total of 419 events in 38 sports were contested by 7,711 athletes from 44 countries. The Games were also co-hosted by its four neighbouring cities: Ulsan, Changwon, Masan and Yangsan. It was opened by President of South Korea, Kim Dae-jung, at the Busan Asiad Main Stadium.

The final medal tally was led by China, followed by host South Korea and Japan. China set a new record and became the first nation in the history of Asian Games to cross the 300 medal-mark in one edition. South Korea set a new record with 95 gold medals. 22 world records and 43 Asian records were broken during the Games. In addition, Japanese Swimming Kosuke Kitajima was announced as the most valuable player (MVP) of the Games.

== Bidding process ==
Busan was selected over Kaohsiung at the 14th Olympic Council of Asia (OCA) General Assembly in Seoul, South Korea on 23 May 1995. The voting involved 41 members of the sports governing body, with 37 of them supporting Busan.

2002 Asian Games bidding result
| City | NOC | Votes |
| Busan | South Korea | 37 |
| Kaohsiung | Chinese Taipei | 4 |

== Development and preparations ==
=== Costs ===
A total of US$2.9 billion was spent for the games.

=== Marketing ===
Official mascot

==== Emblem ====
The emblem of the Games is a motif of the Sea of Japan's blue waves in the shape of Taegeuk, symbolising Busan and Korea. It expresses the image of development and unity of the Asian people and the two dynamic powers that are closely intertwined. The wave's shape in the emblem indicates the character B, the first character of Busan.

==== Mascot ====
The mascot of the 2002 Asian Games is a Sea gull, the city bird of Busan named "Duria", whose name is a combination of the two words 'Durative' and 'Asia', which means "You and Me Together" or Everlasting Asia in the Korean language, which expresses the ideal of the Games: to promote harmony, friendship and prosperity among Asian countries. Its thick black ink and free line expression symbolize Korean traditional culture, while its white colour shade represents the image of a powerful spirit and the great hopes for Asia in the 21st century.

==== Medals ====
The medal of the games featured a top-view design of the Korean traditional octagonal building, Palgakjeong, with the old Olympic Council of Asia logo on the obverse and Busan Asia Games Flame, logo, and Oryukdo scenery on the reverse. The design represents solidarity of membership and eternity of the OCA, Busan as host of the games and youth, unity, and friendship of the athletes.

==== Music ====
In conjunction with the Games, eight songs were released as the official music for the Games:

- "The Dream of Asia" – Lee Moon-se
- "Frontier!-Voices from the East" – Yang Bang-ean & Furee
- "We are..." – Baby box
- "Theme from Duria" – Hong Jong-myung, Shin Hyo-bum
- "The Fanfare" – Busan city Orchestra
- "Welcome to Busan Korea" – Kim Hyo-soo
- "Let's Go!!" – Gang Hyun-soo
- "Love to All of Us" – CAN

=== Torch relay ===
The relay itself started at 11 a.m. on 5 September 2002 when two flames were simultaneously lit at Hallasan in South Korea and Paektu Mountain, the Korean Peninsula’s highest mountain, in North Korea. 42 local flames in other participating nations were also lit at the same time. The two Korean flames were unified into one at Imjingak Pavilion at the truce village of Panmunjeom during the morning of 7 September 2002, being dubbed the Unification flame. After that, a nationwide torch relay totalling a distance of 4,294 kilometres in 23 days was held. The relay passed through 904 districts in 16 cities within the country. The Unification flame, joined with the flames of 42 other participating nations, were unified at the main cauldron base during the opening ceremony on 29 September 2002. The torch design was based on a Korean traditional music instrument called taepyeongso.

=== Venues ===
42 competition venues were used in the Games with twelve of them are newly built, including the Asiad Sports Complex which was completed on 31 July 2000. Other venues included an athletes' village and a main press centre.

==== Asiad Sports Complex ====
| Venue | Events | Capacity | Ref. |
|---|---|---|---|
| Busan Asiad Stadium | Athletics, Football (Final), Opening and closing ceremonies | | |
| Sajik Swimming Pool | Aquatics (Swimming, Synchronized Swimming, Diving) | | |
| Sajik Gymnasium | Basketball, Gymnastics | | |
| Sajik Baseball Stadium | Baseball | | |
| Sajik Tennis Courts | Soft tennis and tennis | | |

==== Gangseo Sports Park ====
| Venue | Events | Capacity | Ref. |
|---|---|---|---|
| Gangseo Archery Field | Archery | | |
| Gangseo Gymnasium | Badminton, Fencing | | |
| Gangseo Hockey Stadium | Hockey | | |

==== Geumjeong Sports Park ====
| Venue | Events | Capacity | Ref. |
|---|---|---|---|
| Geumjeong Gymnasium | Basketball | | |
| Geumjeong Velodrome | Cycling (Track) | | |
| Geumjeong Tennis Stadium | Tennis | | |

==== Gudeok Sports Complex ====
| Venue | Events | Capacity | Ref. |
|---|---|---|---|
| Busan Gudeok Stadium | Football | | |
| Gudeok Baseball Stadium | Baseball | | |
| Gudeok Gymnasium | Judo, Taekwondo | | |

==== Stand Alone Venues ====
| Venue | Events | Capacity | Ref. |
|---|---|---|---|
| Nakdong River Rowing and Canoeing Courses | Canoeing, Rowing | | |
| Gijang Gymnasium | Volleyball (Indoor) | | |
| Haeundae Beach | Volleyball (Beach) | | |
| Dongju College Gymnasium | Cue sports | | |
| Gijang Streets | Cycling (Road) | | |
| Gijang Mountain Bike Race Stadium | Cycling (Mountain, Down hill) | | |
| Busan Citizen's Hall | Bodybuilding | | |
| Homeplus Asiad Bowling Alley | Bowling | | |
| Busan Equestrian Grounds | Equestrian, Modern pentathlon (Riding) | | |
| Asiad Country Club | Golf | | |
| Tongmyong University Stadium | Kabaddi | | |
| Samnak River Athletic Park | Modern pentathlon (Running) | | |
| Busan Yachting Center | Sailing | | |
| Pukyong National University Gymnasium | Weightlifting | | |
| Dongseo University Minseok Sports Center | Wushu, Sepak takraw | | |

==== Changwon Sports Park ====
| Venue | Events | Capacity | Ref. |
|---|---|---|---|
| Changwon Swimming Pool | Aquatics (Water polo), Modern pentathlon (Swimming) | | |
| Changwon Stadium | Football | | |
| Changwon Gymnasium | Handball | | |

==== Masan Sports Complex ====
| Venue | Events | Capacity | Ref. |
|---|---|---|---|
| Masan Gymnasium | Boxing | | |
| Masan Stadium | Football | | |
| Changwon Evergreen Hall | Modern pentathlon (Fencing) | | |
| Changwon International Shooting Range | Shooting, Modern pentathlon (Shooting) | | |
| Yangsan College Gymnasium | Karate, Wrestling, Squash | | |
| Yangsan Stadium | Football | | |

==== Ulsan ====
| Venue | Events | Capacity | Ref. |
|---|---|---|---|
| Ulsan Munsu Football Stadium | Football | | |
| Ulsan Stadium | Rugby | | |
| Dongchun Gymnasium | Table tennis | | |

The Asian Village in Property Development Area, Banyeodong, Haeundae District, Busan had 2,290 apartments in 20 buildings which can accommodate 14,000 people.

=== Transport ===
The host city Busan had existing subway and bus services prior to the games.

== The Games ==
=== Opening ceremony ===
The opening ceremony with the theme A Beautiful Meeting was held on 29 September 2002 at the Busan Asiad Main Stadium. Participating nations marched into the stadium in Korean alphabetical order began with Nepal. North Korea and South Korea jointly entered the stadium under one flag for the first time in Asian Games history and the second time after the 2000 Summer Olympics. South Korean president Kim Dae-Jung declared the Games open, Two Korean athletes — Moon Dae-sung (taekwondo) and Ryu Ji-hye (table tennis) — took the oath on behalf of all the participating athletes while South Korean retired judoist Ha Hyung-joo and North Korean judoist Kye Sun-hui lit the games' cauldron. The cultural part was a six-segment show lasting 40 minutes and was about the encounter between King Kim Suro and the Queen Heo Hwang-ok. The main star of the event was the opera diva Sumi Jo.

=== Participating National Olympic Committees ===
All 44 members of the Olympic Council of Asia (OCA) with 7,711 athletes took part in the Games. Timor-Leste (East Timor) participated for the first time since gaining independence, Afghanistan returned to action after the Taliban came to power, and Saudi Arabia returned after previously boycotting the prior event due to political tensions with Thailand, the host of the 1998 Games. Below is a list of all the participating NOCs; the number of competitors per delegation is indicated in brackets.

Participating National Olympic Committees
- Afghanistan (44)
- Bahrain (84)
- Bangladesh (63)
- Bhutan (20)
- Brunei (27)
- Cambodia (17)
- China (688)
- Chinese Taipei (359)
- Hong Kong (218)
- India (356)
- Indonesia (102)
- Iran (151)
- Japan (659)
- Jordan (23)
- Kazakhstan (284)
- Kuwait (163)
- Kyrgyzstan (72)
- Laos (13)
- Lebanon (73)
- Macau (78)
- Malaysia (212)
- Maldives (23)
- Mongolia (181)
- Myanmar (63)
- Nepal (50)
- North Korea (184)
- Oman (42)
- Pakistan (141)
- Palestine (39)
- Philippines (220)
- Qatar (228)
- Saudi Arabia (69)
- Singapore (96)
- South Korea (770) (host)
- Sri Lanka (84)
- Syria (21)
- Tajikistan (43)
- Thailand (267)
- Timor-Leste (15)
- Turkmenistan (47)
- United Arab Emirates (91)
- Uzbekistan (182)
- Vietnam (121)
- Yemen (42)

=== Sports ===
A total of 419 events in 38 sports was contested in the Games across 16 days of competition. The football and basketball events began two days and one day prior to the opening ceremony respectively. Bodybuilding had its debut at the Games.

- Aquatics
  - Synchronized swimming
  - Diving
  - Swimming
  - Water polo
- Archery
- Athletics
- Badminton
- Baseball
- Basketball
- Cue sports
- Bodybuilding
- Bowling
- Boxing
- Canoeing
- Cycling
  - Mountain bike
  - Road
  - Track
- Equestrian
- Fencing
- Field hockey
- Football
- Golf
- Gymnastics
  - Artistic gymnastics
  - Rhythmic gymnastics
- Handball
- Judo
- Kabaddi
- Karate
- Modern pentathlon
- Rowing
- Rugby union
  - Union
  - Sevens
- Sailing
- Sepaktakraw
- Shooting
- Softball
- Soft tennis
- Squash
- Table tennis
- Taekwondo
- Tennis
- Volleyball
  - Beach volleyball
  - Volleyball
- Weightlifting
- Wrestling
- Wushu

=== Calendar ===
All times are in Korea Standard Time (UTC+9)

| OC | Opening ceremony | ● | Event competitions | 1 | Gold medal events | CC | Closing ceremony |

| September / October | | 27th Fri | 28th Sat | 29th Sun | 30th Mon | 1st Tue | 2nd Wed | 3rd Thu | 4th Fri | 5th Sat | 6th Sun | 7th Mon | 8th Tue | 9th Wed | 10th Thu | 11th Fri | 12th Sat | 13th Sun | 14th Mon | Events |
|---|---|---|---|---|---|---|---|---|---|---|---|---|---|---|---|---|---|---|---|---|
| Ceremonies | | | | OC | | | | | | | | | | | | | | | CC | —N/a |
| Aquatics | Diving | | | | | | | | | | | | 2 | 2 | 1 | 1 | 1 | 1 | | 43 |
| Aquatics | Swimming | | | | 5 | 5 | 6 | 6 | 5 | 5 | | | | | | | | | | 43 |
| Aquatics | Synchronized swimming | | | | ● | 1 | 1 | | | | | | | | | | | | | 43 |
| Aquatics | Water polo | | | | ● | ● | ● | | ● | | 1 | | | | | | | | | 43 |
| Archery | | | | | | | | | | | ● | ● | 1 | 1 | 2 | | | | | 4 |
| Athletics | | | | | | | | | | | | 5 | 10 | 7 | 9 | | 5 | 8 | 1 | 45 |
| Badminton | | | | | | | | | | | ● | ● | 1 | 1 | ● | ● | ● | 2 | 3 | 7 |
| Baseball | | | | | | | ● | ● | ● | ● | ● | ● | ● | 1 | | | | | | 1 |
| Basketball | | | ● | ● | ● | | ● | ● | ● | ● | ● | ● | ● | ● | ● | | ● | ● | 2 | 2 |
| Bodybuilding | | | | | | | | ● | ● | 4 | 4 | | | | | | | | | 8 |
| Bowling | | | | | | | | 2 | 2 | ● | 2 | 2 | ● | 2 | | | | | | 10 |
| Boxing | | | | | | | ● | ● | ● | ● | ● | ● | ● | ● | | ● | ● | 12 | | 12 |
| Canoeing | | | | | | | | | | | | | | | 5 | ● | 8 | | | 13 |
| Cue sports | | | | | | 1 | ● | 2 | 1 | 2 | 1 | 2 | 1 | | | | | | | 10 |
| Cycling | Road | | | | 2 | | 1 | 1 | | | | | | | | | | | | 20 |
| Cycling | Track | | | | | | | | 2 | 3 | | 3 | 4 | | | | | | | 20 |
| Cycling | Mountain bike | | | | | | | | | | | | | | 2 | | 1 | 1 | | 20 |
| Equestrian | | | | | | | ● | ● | 2 | | | | 1 | | 1 | ● | 1 | | 1 | 6 |
| Fencing | | | | 2 | 2 | 2 | 2 | 2 | 2 | | | | | | | | | | | 12 |
| Field hockey | | | | | ● | | ● | | ● | ● | ● | ● | | ● | ● | 1 | 1 | | | 2 |
| Football | | ● | ● | | ● | ● | ● | ● | ● | ● | | ● | ● | ● | ● | 1 | | 1 | | 2 |
| Golf | | | | | | | | ● | ● | ● | 4 | | | | | | | | | 4 |
| Gymnastics | Artistic | | | | | 1 | 1 | 2 | 5 | 5 | | | | | | | | | | 16 |
| Gymnastics | Rhythmic | | | | | | | | | | | | 1 | 1 | | | | | | 16 |
| Handball | | | | | ● | ● | ● | ● | ● | ● | ● | ● | ● | ● | | ● | 1 | 1 | | 2 |
| Judo | | | | | 4 | 4 | 4 | 4 | | | | | | | | | | | | 16 |
| Kabaddi | | | | | | | | | ● | ● | ● | 1 | | | | | | | | 1 |
| Karate | | | | | | | | | | | | | | | | 7 | 4 | | | 11 |
| Modern pentathlon | | | | | | | | | | | | | | | 2 | 2 | 1 | 1 | | 6 |
| Rowing | | | | | ● | ● | 6 | 7 | | | | | | | | | | | | 13 |
| Rugby union | | | | | ● | 1 | | | | ● | | | | ● | | | | 1 | | 2 |
| Sailing | | | | | | | | ● | ● | ● | | ● | ● | 15 | | | | | | 15 |
| Sepak takraw | | | | | ● | 2 | ● | ● | ● | ● | 2 | ● | ● | 2 | | | | | | 6 |
| Shooting | | | | | | | 8 | 6 | 6 | 6 | 6 | 6 | 4 | | | | | | | 42 |
| Soft tennis | | | | | | ● | ● | 2 | ● | ● | | 5 | | | | | | | | 7 |
| Softball | | | | | ● | ● | ● | ● | ● | ● | 1 | | | | | | | | | 1 |
| Squash | | | | | ● | ● | ● | ● | 2 | | | | | | | | | | | 2 |
| Table tennis | | | | | | ● | ● | ● | 1 | 1 | 1 | ● | 2 | 2 | | | | | | 7 |
| Taekwondo | | | | | | | | | | | | | | | 4 | 4 | 4 | 4 | | 16 |
| Tennis | | | | | | | ● | ● | ● | 1 | | 1 | ● | ● | ● | 3 | 2 | | | 7 |
| Volleyball | Beach | | | ● | ● | ● | ● | ● | 2 | | | | | | | | | | | 4 |
| Volleyball | Indoor | | | | | | ● | ● | ● | ● | ● | ● | ● | | ● | ● | 1 | 1 | | 4 |
| Weightlifting | | | | | 1 | 2 | 2 | 2 | 1 | | 1 | 2 | 2 | 1 | 1 | | | | | 15 |
| Wrestling | | | | | | | ● | 5 | 4 | | ● | 5 | 4 | | | | | | | 18 |
| Wushu | | | | | | | | | | | | | | | ● | ● | 2 | 9 | | 11 |
| Daily medal events | | | | 2 | 14 | 19 | 31 | 41 | 35 | 27 | 23 | 32 | 33 | 35 | 27 | 19 | 32 | 42 | 7 | 419 |
| Cumulative total | | | | 2 | 16 | 35 | 66 | 107 | 142 | 169 | 192 | 224 | 257 | 292 | 319 | 338 | 370 | 412 | 419 | 419 |
| September / October | | 27th Fri | 28th Sat | 29th Sun | 30th Mon | 1st Tue | 2nd Wed | 3rd Thu | 4th Fri | 5th Sat | 6th Sun | 7th Mon | 8th Tue | 9th Wed | 10th Thu | 11th Fri | 12th Sat | 13th Sun | 14th Mon | Events |

=== Closing ceremony ===
The closing ceremony with the theme Returning to Home was held on the evening of Monday, 14 October 2002 at the Busan Asiad Main Stadium. Japanese swimmer Kosuke Kitajima was announced as the most valuable player (MVP) of the Games. Samih Moudallal, vice president of the Olympic Council of Asia (OCA), on behalf of OCA President Sheikh Ahmad Al-Fahad Al Sabah declared the games closing. The Asian Games flag was handed over to Doha, Qatar, host of the next edition in 2006. A cultural segment of the city was also presented.

== Medal table ==
The top ten ranked NOCs at these Games are listed below. The host nation, South Korea, is highlighted.

* Host nation (South Korea)

| Rank | Nation | Gold | Silver | Bronze | Total |
|---|---|---|---|---|---|
| 1 | China (CHN) | 150 | 84 | 74 | 308 |
| 2 | South Korea (KOR)* | 96 | 80 | 84 | 260 |
| 3 | Japan (JPN) | 44 | 73 | 72 | 189 |
| 4 | Kazakhstan (KAZ) | 20 | 26 | 30 | 76 |
| 5 | Uzbekistan (UZB) | 15 | 12 | 24 | 51 |
| 6 | Thailand (THA) | 14 | 19 | 10 | 43 |
| 7 | India (IND) | 11 | 12 | 13 | 36 |
| 8 | Chinese Taipei (TPE) | 10 | 17 | 25 | 52 |
| 9 | North Korea (PRK) | 9 | 11 | 13 | 33 |
| 10 | Iran (IRI) | 8 | 14 | 14 | 36 |
| 11–39 | Remaining | 50 | 73 | 143 | 266 |
| Totals (39 entries) | | 427 | 421 | 502 | 1,350 |

== Broadcasting ==
Busan Asian Games Radio and Television Organization (BARTO), a joint venture between Korean Broadcasting System (KBS), Munhwa Broadcasting Corporation (MBC) and Seoul Broadcasting System (SBS), served as the host broadcaster of these Games, covered 28 of the 38 sports during the event. The International Broadcast Centre was located at Busan Exhibition and Convention Center (BEXCO) in Haeundae District.

== Concerns and controversies ==
=== Doping issues ===
On 7 October 2002, the Olympic Council of Asia announced that the bodybuilding bronze medalist in the +90 kg weight category Youssef El-Zein of Lebanon was relieved of his medal for not submitting to a drugs test. After El-Zein was disqualified, the bronze medal in the +90 kg category went to Choi Jae-Duck of South Korea (who had finished fourth).

Six days later, Japanese news agency Kyodo News reported that Indian middle-distance runner Sunita Rani had tested positive for a banned substance, which was later confirmed by Lee Choon-Sup, Deputy Secretary General of the Busan Asian Games Organizing Committee; an unofficial report stated that the substance was the anabolic steroid nandrolone. Sunita had won two medals in athletics: a gold in the 1,500 m (setting an Asian Games record) and a bronze in the 5,000 m, (in which Sunita jointly bettered the Games record set by Indonesian Suprianti Sutono in Bangkok during the 1998 Asian Games with six other athletes). The Indian Chef de Mission at the Games backed Sunita—who denied using any banned drug—and asked for a "B" sample test from Bangkok, but tests were run only at the Asian Games’ Doping Control Center (AGDCC) in Seoul (the laboratory accredited by the IOC). On 16 October, the AGDCC confirmed the steroid nandrolone in Sunita's urine sample; as a consequence, the OCA stripped her of both medals and dismissed her Asian Games record for the 1,500 m.

The Indian Olympic Association (IOA) requested the intervention of the International Association of Athletics Federations and the IOC; the samples were jointly reexamined by the World Anti-Doping Agency and the IOC Sub-Commission on Doping and Biochemistry of Sport. In January 2003, the OCA announced that the IOC Medical Director had cleared Sunita of the doping charge and that appropriate action would be taken against the AGDCC. Both of Sunita's medals were reinstated on 4 February 2003, in a ceremony attended by the Secretary General of OCA Randhir Singh and the president of the IOA Suresh Kalmadi.

Three Malaysian sepak takraw players were sent home for failing drug tests after testing positive for morphine.

=== Missing athletes ===
A total of 16 athletes including 12 Nepalese, three Sri Lankans and one Mongolian were reported to be missing, with police and sports officials suspecting them to have found illegal jobs in South Korea.

== See also ==
- 1986 Asian Games
- 2002 FESPIC Games
- List of IOC country codes

== Notes ==
| Preceded by Bangkok | Asian Games; Busan; XIV Asian Games (2002) | Succeeded by Doha |
