= Diving at the 2002 Asian Games =

- Venue: Sajik Swimming Pool
- Dates: 8–13 October 2002
- Competitors: 49 from 12 nations

Diving was contested from 8 October 2002 to 13 October 2002 at the 2002 Asian Games in Sajik Swimming Pool, Busan, South Korea. China dominated the competition winning all gold medals.

== Schedule ==
P	Preliminary	S	Semifinal	F	Final

Event↓/Date →	8th Tue	9th Wed	10th Thu			11th Fri		12th Sat		13th Sun	
Men's 3 m springboard						S	F				
Men's 10 m platform										S	F
Men's synchronized 3 m springboard		F									
Men's synchronized 10 m platform	F										
Women's 3 m springboard			P	S	F						
Women's 10 m platform								S	F		
Women's synchronized 3 m springboard	F										
Women's synchronized 10 m platform		F									

== Medalists ==
=== Men ===
Event	Gold	Silver	Bronze
3 m springboard	Wang Tianling; China	Wang Feng; China	Yeoh Ken Nee; Malaysia
10 m platform	Tian Liang; China	Xu Xiang; China	Jo Chol-ryong; North Korea
Synchronized 3 m springboard	China; Peng Bo; Wang Kenan	South Korea; Cho Kwan-hoon; Kwon Kyung-min	Malaysia; Yeoh Ken Nee; Rossharisham Roslan
Synchronized 10 m platform	China; Hu Jia; Xu Hao	North Korea; Ri Jong-nam; Jo Chol-ryong	South Korea; Cho Kwan-hoon; Kwon Kyung-min

=== Women ===
Event	Gold	Silver	Bronze
3 m springboard	Guo Jingjing; China	Wu Minxia; China	Ryoko Nishii; Japan
10 m platform	Lao Lishi; China	Li Na; China	Kim Kyong-ju; North Korea
Synchronized 3 m springboard	China; Guo Jingjing; Wu Minxia	South Korea; Kang Min-kyung; Im Sung-young	Malaysia; Farah Begum Abdullah; Leong Mun Yee
Synchronized 10 m platform	China; Duan Qing; Li Ting	North Korea; Kim Kyong-ju; Jon Hyon-ju	Japan; Emi Otsuki; Takiri Miyazaki

== Medal table ==
Rank	Nation	Gold	Silver	Bronze	Total
1	China (CHN)	8	4	0	12
2	North Korea (PRK)	0	2	2	4
3	South Korea (KOR)	0	2	1	3
4	Malaysia (MAS)	0	0	3	3
5	Japan (JPN)	0	0	2	2
Totals (5 entries)		8	8	8	24

== Participating nations ==
A total of 49 athletes from 12 nations competed in diving at the 2002 Asian Games:

- China (14)
- Chinese Taipei (3)
- Indonesia (2)
- Japan (6)
- Kazakhstan (1)
- Malaysia (6)
- North Korea (4)
- Philippines (3)
- Qatar (1)
- South Korea (6)
- Thailand (1)
- Vietnam (2)
