= Malaysia at the 2002 Asian Games =

- IOC code: MAS
- NOC: Olympic Council of Malaysia
- Website: www.olympic.org.my (in English)

in Busan
- Competitors: 212 in 25 sports
- Flag bearer: Shalin Zulkifli
- Medals Ranked 12th: Gold 6 Silver 8 Bronze 16 Total 30

Asian Games appearances (overview)
- 1954; 1958; 1962; 1966; 1970; 1974; 1978; 1982; 1986; 1990; 1994; 1998; 2002; 2006; 2010; 2014; 2018; 2022; 2026

Other related appearances
- North Borneo (1954, 1958, 1962); Sarawak (1962)

Malaysia competed in the 2002 Asian Games held in Busan, South Korea, from 29 September to 14 October 2002. Athletes from the Malaysia won overall 30 medals (including six golds), and clinched twelfth spot in the medal table. Mohd Khalid Mohd Yunus was the chief of the delegation.

== Medal summary ==
=== Medals by sport ===
Sport	Gold	Silver	Bronze	Total	Rank
Badminton	0	0	2	2	5
Bodybuilding	0	1	0	1	7
Bowling	2	1	1	4	3
Boxing	0	0	1	1	11
Cycling	0	1	0	1	8
Diving	0	0	3	3	4
Equestrian	0	0	1	1	5
Field hockey	0	0	1	1	4
Karate	2	1	2	5	3
Sailing	0	1	0	1	8
Sepaktakraw	0	1	1	2	5
Squash	1	1	2	4	1
Swimming	0	1	0	1	5
Taekwondo	0	0	2	2	9
Wushu	1	0	0	1	6
Total	6	8	16	30	12

=== Multiple medalists ===
Malaysian competitors that have won at least two medals.

Name	Sport	Gold	Silver	Bronze	Total
Sarah Yap	Bowling	1		1	2
Shalin Zulkifli	Bowling	1		1	2
Wendy Chai	Bowling	1		1	2
Azman Nasruddin	Sepaktakraw		1	1	2
Fauzi Ghadzali	Sepaktakraw		1	1	2
Noor Ariffin Pawanteh	Sepaktakraw		1	1	2
Suhaimi Mat Salim	Sepaktakraw		1	1	2
Zulkarnain Arif	Sepaktakraw		1	1	2
Chan Chong Ming	Badminton			2	2
Yeoh Ken Nee	Diving			2	2

=== Medallists ===
The following Malaysian competitors won medals at the games; all dates are for October 2002.

Medal	Name	Sport	Event	Date
Gold	Sarah Yap; Wendy Chai	Bowling	Women's doubles	4
Gold	Shalin Zulkifli	Bowling	Women's masters	9
Gold	Puvaneswaran Ramasamy	Karate	Men's kumite 55 kg	12
Gold	Premila Supramaniam	Karate	Women's kumite 60 kg	11
Gold	Ong Beng Hee	Squash	Men's singles	4
Gold	Ho Ro Bin	Wushu	Men's nanquan	13
Silver	Liaw Teck Leong	Bodybuilding	Men's 80 kg	5
Silver	Lai Kin Ngoh	Bowling	Women's masters	9
Silver	Josiah Ng	Cycling	Men's sprint	8
Silver	Lim Lee Lee	Karate	Women's individual kata	11
Silver	Kevin Lim	Sailing	Men's laser	9
Silver	Fauzi Ghadzali; Suhaimi Mat Salim; Ahmad Ezzat Zaki; Zulkarnain Arif; Rukman Mustapha; Azman Nasruddin; Noor Ariffin Pawanteh; Zabidi Shariff; Suhaimi Yusof	Sepaktakraw	Men's team	6
Silver	Nicol David	Squash	Women's singles	4
Silver	Alex Lim	Swimming	Men's 100 metre backstroke	3
Bronze	Chan Chong Ming; Chew Choon Eng	Badminton	Men's doubles	14
Bronze	Chan Chong Ming; Chang Kim Wai; Chew Choon Eng; Choong Tan Fook; James Chua; Mohd Zakry Abdul Latif; Muhammad Hafiz Hashim; Lee Tsuen Seng; Ong Ewe Hock; Wong Choong Hann	Badminton	Men's team	9
Bronze	Sarah Yap; Shalin Zulkifli; Wendy Chai	Bowling	Women's trios	6
Bronze	Adnan Yusoh	Boxing	Men's 60 kg	13
Bronze	Yeoh Ken Nee	Diving	Men's 3 metre springboard	11
Bronze	Rossharisham Roslan; Yeoh Ken Nee	Diving	Men's synchronised 3 metre springboard	9
Bronze	Farah Begum Abdullah; Leong Mun Yee	Diving	Women's synchronised 3 metre springboard	8
Bronze	Qabil Ambak Mahamad Fathil; Quzier Ambak Mahamad Fathil; Syed Omar Al-Mohdzar; Syed Zain Al-Mohdzar	Equestrian	Team jumping	12
Bronze	Malaysia national field hockey team: Chairil Anwar Aziz; Shaiful Azli Abdul Rahman; Chua Boon Huat; Roslan Jamaluddin; Keevan Raj Kali; Gobinathan Krishnamurthy; Mohd Rodzhanizam Mat Radzi; Megat Azrafiq Termizi; Azlan Misron; Mohd Madzli Ikmar; Redzuan Ponirin; Mohd Amin Rahim; Norazlan Rahim; Mohd Fairuz Ramli; Kuhan Shanmuganathan; Kumar Subramaniam	Field hockey	Men's tournament	12
Bronze	Ku Jin Keat	Karate	Men's individual kata	11
Bronze	Murugaiyan Srirajarajeswari	Karate	Women's kumite 53 kg	9
Bronze	Fauzi Ghadzali; Suhaimi Mat Salim; Zulkarnain Arif; Azman Nasruddin; Noor Ariffin Pawanteh	Sepaktakraw	Men's regu	4
Bronze	Mohd Azlan Iskandar	Squash	Men's singles	4
Bronze	Sharon Wee	Squash	Women's singles	4
Bronze	Lee Pei Fen	Taekwondo	Women's 63 kg	10
Bronze	Lee Wan Yuen	Taekwondo	Women's +72 kg	13

== Archery ==
Women

Athlete	Event	Ranking round		Round of 32	Round of 16	Quarterfinals	Semifinals	Final	
Athlete	Event	Score	Seed	Opposition Score	Opposition Score	Opposition Score	Opposition Score	Opposition Score	Rank
Anbarasi Subramaniam	Individual	1197	33	Did not advance					
Fairuz Hanisah Che Ibrahim	Individual	1230	29	Did not advance					
Lavanyah Raj Savindarasu	Individual	1244	25 Q	Dorji Dema (BHU); L 141–146	Did not advance				
Mon Redee Sut Txi	Individual	1260	19 Q	Tshering Chhoden (BHU); W 150–148	Yuan Shu-chi (TPE); L 143–155	Did not advance			
Anbarasi Subramaniam; Fairuz Hanisah Che Ibrahim; Lavanyah Raj Savindarasu; Mon Redee Sut Txi	Team	3734	6 Q	—N/a	Bye	Chinese Taipei (TPE); L 217–229	Did not advance		

== Athletics ==
Key

- Note–Ranks given for track events are within the athlete's heat only
- Q = Qualified for the next round
- q = Qualified for the next round as a fastest loser or, in field events, by position without achieving the qualifying target
- NR = National record
- N/A = Round not applicable for the event
- Bye = Athlete not required to compete in round

Men
Track events

Athlete	Event	Round 1		Semifinal		Final	
Athlete	Event	Time	Rank	Time	Rank	Time	Rank
Azmi Ibrahim	200 m	22.87	6	did not advance			
Nazmizan Mohamad	200 m	21.76	6 q	21.60	7	did not advance	
Mohd Faiz Mohamad	110 m hurdles	14.56	4 q	—N/a		14.57	7
Azmi Ibrahim; Mohd Zaiful Zainal Abidin; Nazmizan Mohamad; Tan Kok Lim	4 × 100 m relay	40.30	3 Q	—N/a		41.20	8

Field event

Athlete	Event	Qualification		Final	
Athlete	Event	Distance	Rank	Distance	Rank
Loo Kum Zee	High jump	—N/a		2.10	12

Women
Track and road events

Athlete	Event	Round 1		Semifinal		Final	
Athlete	Event	Time	Rank	Time	Rank	Time	Rank
Moh Siew Wei	100 m hurdles	13.79	4 q	—N/a		13.81	8
Yuan Yufang	20 km road walk	—N/a				1:37:08	6

== Badminton ==
Athlete	Event	Round of 32	Round of 16	Quarterfinal	Semifinal	Final	
Athlete	Event	Opposition Score	Opposition Score	Opposition Score	Opposition Score	Opposition Score	Rank
Muhammad Hafiz Hashim	Men's singles	O Man Tong (MAC); W 15–2, 15–3	Chen Hong (CHN); W 15–7, 11–15, 15–5	Taufik Hidayat (INA); L 11–15, 5–15	Did not advance		
Wong Choong Hann (4)	Men's singles	Bye	Ng Wei (HKG); W 15–8, 3–15, 15–5	Lee Hyun-il (KOR); L 15–12, 9–15, 6–15	Did not advance		
Chan Chong Ming; Chew Choon Eng (4)	Men's doubles	—N/a	Zhang Wei; Wang Wei (CHN); W 15–7, 7–15, 17–14	Candra Wijaya; Sigit Budiarto (INA); W 8–15, 17–14, 15–5	Lee Dong-soo; Yoo Yong-sung (KOR); L 16–17, 12–15	Did not advance	3rd place, bronze medalist(s)
Choong Tan Fook; Chang Kim Wai	Men's doubles	—N/a	Halim Haryanto; Tri Kusharjanto (INA); L 10–15, 9–15	Did not advance			
Wong Mew Choo	Women's singles	—N/a	Wang Chen (HKG); L 4–11, 7–11	Did not advance			
Ng Mee Fen	Women's singles	—N/a	Sujitra Ekmongkolpaisarn (THA); W 11–8, 2–11, 2–1^{r}	Kim Kyeung-ran (KOR); L 1–11, 7–11	Did not advance		
Ang Li Peng; Lim Pek Siah	Women's doubles	—N/a	Cheng Wen-hsing; Chien Yu-chin (TPE); L 2–11, 9–11	Did not advance			
Wong Pei Tty; Chin Eei Hui	Women's doubles	—N/a	Shizuka Yamamoto; Seiko Yamada (JPN); L 7–11, 6–11	Did not advance			
Chang Kim Wai; Wong Pei Tty	Mixed doubles	—N/a	Chen Qiqiu; Zhang Jiewen (CHN); L 5–11, 2–11	Did not advance			
Chew Choon Eng; Chin Eei Hui	Mixed doubles	—N/a	Khunakorn Sudhisodhi; Saralee Thungthongkam (THA); L 5–11, 6–11	Did not advance			

Men's team
Quarterfinal

6 October	Hong Kong	0–3	Malaysia

Ng Wei	1–2	Wong Choong Hann	2–15, 17–14, 8–15
Tam Lok Tin	0–2	Lee Tsuen Seng	6–15, 4–15
Liu Kwok Wa / Yau Tsz Yuk	0–2	Chan Chong Ming / Chew Choon Eng	3–15, 5–15

Semifinal

7 October	South Korea	3–0	Malaysia

Shon Seung-mo	2–1	Wong Choong Hann	4–15, 15–6, 15–7
Lee Hyun-il	2–0	Lee Tsuen Seng	15–5, 15–2
Lee Dong-soo / Yoo Yong-sung	2–1	Chan Chong Ming / Chew Choon Eng	12–15, 15–9, 15–3

Ranked 3rd in final standings

Women's team
Quarterfinal

6 October	Malaysia	2–3	Thailand

Wong Mew Choo	0–2	Sujitra Ekmongkolpaisarn	5–11, 3–11
Ng Mee Fen	2–1	Salakjit Ponsana	0–11, 11–5, 11–8
Wong Miew Kheng	2–0	Sathinee Chankrachangwong	11–2, 11–6
Lim Pek Siah / Ang Li Peng	0–2	Saralee Thungthongkam / Sujitra Ekmongkolpaisarn	4–11, 8–11
Chin Eei Hui / Wong Pei Tty	1–2	Sathinee Chankrachangwong / Salakjit Ponsana	11–7, 4–11, 7–11

== Basketball ==
=== Women's tournament ===
Preliminary round

Team	Pld	W	L	PF	PA	PD	Pts
China	5	5	0	504	341	+163	10
South Korea	5	4	1	495	347	+148	9
Chinese Taipei	5	3	2	430	424	+6	8
Japan	5	2	3	443	436	+7	7
Uzbekistan	5	1	4	344	466	−122	6
Malaysia	5	0	5	267	469	−202	5

4 October
17:00

Malaysia	45–93	South Korea
Scoring by quarter: 12–25, 12–26, 9–21, 12–21
Pts: Chow S.F. 14; Rebs: Chow S.F. 10; Asts: Low M.H. 3		Pts: Kim K.R. 20; Rebs: Jung S.M. 8 Asts: Chun J.W., Park J.E. 3

Geumjeong Gymnasium, Busan

5 October
17:00

Chinese Taipei	84–60	Malaysia
Scoring by quarter: 23–19, 20–13, 23–14, 18–14
Pts: Chien W.C., Chao P.F. 16; Rebs: Cheng H.Y. 18; Asts: Chien W.C. 5		Pts: Chow S.F. 19; Rebs: Tai L.S. 9 Asts: Low B.C. 3

Geumjeong Gymnasium, Busan

7 October
13:00

Malaysia	53–108	China
Scoring by quarter: 22–21, 10–37, 11–23, 10–27
Pts: Tai L.S., Low M.H. 15; Rebs: Tai L.S., Kew S.M. 6 Asts: Kew S.M. 2		Pts: Miao L.J. 15; Rebs: Zhang X.N. 11; Asts: Miao L.J. 3

Geumjeong Gymnasium, Busan

8 October
13:00

Uzbekistan	79–52	Malaysia
Scoring by quarter: 20–5, 17–18, 26–8, 16–21
Pts: Dmitrieva 24; Rebs: Dmitrieva 19; Asts: Shagan, Shmarikova, Reyngold 1		Pts: Choo S.Y. 9 Rebs: Chow S.F. 7 Asts: Tai L.S., Choo S.Y., Yoong S.Y. 1

Geumjeong Gymnasium, Busan

9 October
13:00

Malaysia	57–105	Japan
Scoring by quarter: 14–28, 10–31, 19–26, 14–20
Pts: Chow S.F., Chew Y.Y. 13; Rebs: Tai L.S. 5 Asts: Low M.H., Kew S.M., Chew Y.Y. 1		Pts: Tachikawa 23; Rebs: Yamada 10; Asts: Yano, Kawakami 2

Geumjeong Gymnasium, Busan

Ranked 6th in final standings

== Bodybuilding ==
Men

Athlete	Event	Preliminaries		Final	
Athlete	Event	Result	Rank	Result	Rank
Liaw Teck Leong	80 kg		Q		2nd place, silver medalist(s)
Othman Yahya	85 kg		Q		5

== Bowling ==
Singles

Player	Event	Total	Final rank
Alex Liew Kien Liang	Men's singles	1168	70
Azidi Ameran	Men's singles	1222	48
Ben Heng Boon Hian	Men's singles	1176	68
Daniel Lim Tow Chuang	Men's singles	1337	13
Gerald Samuel	Men's singles	1212	54
Zulmazran Zulkifli	Men's singles	1099	87
Lai Kin Ngoh	Women's singles	1167	26
Lisa Kwan	Women's singles	1143	29
Sarah Yap	Women's singles	1088	42
Shalin Zulkifli	Women's singles	1263	8
Sharon Chai	Women's singles	1181	24
Wendy Chai De Choo	Women's singles	1191	20

Doubles

Player	Event	Total	Final rank
Alex Liew Kien Liang; Gerald Samuel	Men's doubles	2512	16
Ben Heng Boon Hian; Zulmazran Zulkifli	Men's doubles	2498	19
Azidi Ameran; Daniel Lim Tow Chuang	Men's doubles	2343	35
Lai Kin Ngoh; Shalin Zulkifli	Women's doubles	2447	5
Lisa Kwan; Sharon Chai	Women's doubles	2355	16
Sarah Yap; Wendy Chai De Choo	Women's doubles	2589	1st place, gold medalist(s)

Trios

Player	Event	Total	Final rank
Alex Liew Kien Liang; Gerald Samuel; Zulmazran Zulkifli	Men's trios	3663	13
Azidi Ameran; Ben Heng Boon Hian; Daniel Lim Tow Chuang	Men's trios	3692	10
Lai Kin Ngoh; Lisa Kwan; Sharon Chai	Women's trios	3644	7
Sarah Yap; Shalin Zulkifli; Wendy Chai De Choo	Women's trios	3720	3rd place, bronze medalist(s)

Team

Player	Event	Total	Final rank
Alex Liew Kien Liang; Azidi Ameran; Ben Heng Boon Hian; Daniel Lim Tow Chuang; Gerald Samuel; Zulmazran Zulkifli	Men's team	6112	5
Lai Kin Ngoh; Lisa Kwan; Sarah Yap; Shalin Zulkifli; Sharon Chai; Wendy Chai De Choo	Women's team	5899	5

Masters

Player	Event	Preliminary		Stepladder finals	
Player	Event	Score	Rank	Score	Final rank
Alex Liew Kien Liang	Men's masters	3529	8	did not advance	
Lai Kin Ngoh	Women's masters	3517	3 Q	Grand final 2nd – 3rd place Kim Hyo-mi (KOR); W 210–206; Grand final 1st – 2nd place Shalin Zulkifli (MAS); L 381–465	2nd place, silver medalist(s)
Shalin Zulkifli	Women's masters	3612	2 Q	Grand final 2nd – 3rd place Bye; Grand final 1st – 2nd place Lai Kin Ngoh (MAS); W 465–381	1st place, gold medalist(s)

== Boxing ==
Athlete	Event	Round of 32	Round of 16	Quarterfinal	Semifinal	Final	
Athlete	Event	Opposition Score	Opposition Score	Opposition Score	Opposition Score	Opposition Score	Rank
Zamzai Azizi Mohamad	Men's light flyweight (48 kg)	Bye	Xayyaphone Chanthasone (LAO); W 15–11	Kim Ki-suk (KOR); L RSCO	Did not advance		
Adnan Yusoh	Men's lightweight (60 kg)	Bye	Nilonedone Tanovanh (LAO); W 25–14	Abyl Tileberdi Uulu (KGZ); W 40–36	Dilshod Mahmudov (UZB); L 18–34	Did not advance	3rd place, bronze medalist(s)

== Cue sports ==
Men

Athlete	Event	Round of 32	Round of 16	Quarterfinals	Semifinals	Final	Rank
Athlete	Event	Opposition Score	Opposition Score	Opposition Score	Opposition Score	Opposition Score	Rank
Moh Loon Hong	Three-cushion singles	—N/a	Hwang Deuk-hee (KOR); L 16 - 50	did not advance			
Patrick Ooi	Three-cushion singles	—N/a	Siddharth Anand (IND); W 36 - 21	Lee Sang-chun (KOR); L 16 - 50	did not advance		
Moh Loon Hong	Partie libre singles	—N/a	Udon Khaimuk (THA); L 77 - 88	did not advance			
Simon Sim (2)	Partie libre singles	—N/a	Bye	Nobuaki Kobayashi (JPN); L W/O	did not advance		
Moh Loon Hong	English billiards singles	—N/a	Park Seung-chil (KOR); W 2 - 0	Kyaw Oo (MYA); L 0 - 2	did not advance		
Simon Sim	English billiards singles	—N/a	Nguyễn Trung Kiên (VIE); W 2 - 1	Praprut Chaithanasakun (THA); L 0 - 2	did not advance		
Moh Loon Hong; Simon Sim	English billiards doubles	—N/a		Praprut Chaithanasakun; Mongkhon Kanfaklang (THA); L 0 - 2	did not advance		
Alan Tan	Eight-ball singles	Ryu Seung-woo (KOR); L 6 - 9	did not advance				
Ibrahim Amir	Eight-ball singles	Zhang Kai (VIE); W 9 - 5	Bernard Tey (SIN); W 9 - 6	Efren Reyes (PHI); L 6 - 9	did not advance		
Alan Tan	Nine-ball singles	Jeong Young-hwa (KOR); L 7 - 11	did not advance				
Ibrahim Amir	Nine-ball singles	Fu Jianbo (CHN); L 10 - 11	did not advance				
Alan Tan; Ibrahim Amir	Nine-ball doubles	—N/a	Francisco Bustamante; Antonio Lining (PHI); L 6 - 11	did not advance			
Ng Ann Seng (4)	Snooker singles	Mohammed Al-Jokar (UAE); W 3 - 0	Jin Long (CHN); W 3 - 2	Chan Kwok Ming (HKG); L 2 - 3	did not advance		
Sam Chong (2)	Snooker singles	Saleh Mohammad (PAK); L 2 - 3	did not advance				
Ng Ann Seng; Sam Chong (1)	Snooker doubles	—N/a	Bye	Yasin Merchant; Rafat Habib (IND); L 1 - 3	did not advance		
Ng Ann Seng; Patrick Ooi; Sam Chong (4)	Snooker team	—N/a	Wong Chan Keong; Mok Sek Kei; Si Tou Chong Wut (MAC); W 3 - 0	Mohammed Al-Jokar; Eissa Al-Sayed; Mohammed Shehab (UAE); W 3 - 0	Chan Kwok Ming; Fung Kwok Wai; Marco Fu (HKG); L 1 - 2	Bronze medal match Muhammad Yousaf; Saleh Mohammad; Naveen Perwani (PAK); L 0 - 3	4

== Cycling ==
=== Track ===
Sprint

Athlete	Event	Qualifying		1/8 final	1/4 final	Semifinal	Final	
Athlete	Event	Time	Rank	Opposition Time	Opposition Time	Opposition Time	Opposition Time	Rank
Ghaffuan Ghazali	Men's sprint	10.807	8 Q	Gao Zhiguo (CHN); L	Bye		9th – 12th classification Zhang Lei (CHN); Huang Chih-ying (TPE); Chester Lam (HKG); L	11
Ghaffuan Ghazali	Men's sprint	10.807	8 Q	Repechages; Agus Yulianto (INA); Huang Chih-ying (TPE); L	Bye		9th – 12th classification Zhang Lei (CHN); Huang Chih-ying (TPE); Chester Lam (HKG); L	11
Josiah Ng	Men's sprint	10.609	3 Q	Huang Chih-ying (TPE); W 11.663	Cho Hyun-ok (KOR); W 11.808, W 11.203	Kim Hyung-il (KOR); W 11.295, W 11.311	Gold medal match Takashi Kaneko (JPN); L, L	2nd place, silver medalist(s)
Fairuz Izni Abdul Ghani; Ghaffuan Ghazali; Josiah Ng	Men's team sprint	1:04.860	5	—N/a			did not advance	

Points race

Athlete	Event	Qualification		Final	
Athlete	Event	Points	Rank	Points	Rank
Ghaffuan Ghazali	Men's points race	—N/a		0	16

Keirin

Athlete	Event	Round 1		Repechage 1		Semifinal		Final	
Athlete	Event	Opposition Time	Rank	Opposition Time	Rank	Opposition Time	Rank	Opposition Time	Rank
Fairuz Izni Abdul Ghani	Men's keirin	Yuji Yamada (JPN); Hyun Byung-chul (KOR); Bryan Dimacali (PHI); Chester Lam (HKG); L	2 Q	Bye		Shinichi Ota (JPN); Hyun Byung-chul (KOR); Shi Qingyu (CHN); Wu Hsien-tang (TPE); Wawan Setyobudi (INA); L	5	7th – 12th classification Chester Lam (HKG); Wawan Setyobudi (INA); Samai Amari (INA); Wu Hsien-tang (TPE); Lin Chih-hsan (TPE); L	8
Josiah Ng	Men's keirin	Kim Chi-bum (KOR); Shi Qingyu (CHN); Wawan Setyobudi (INA); Wu Hsien-tang (TPE); L	3 Q	Bye		Yuji Yamada (JPN); Kim Chi-bum (KOR); Lin Chih-hsan (TPE); Chester Lam (HKG); Samai Amari (INA); L	2 Q	1st – 6th classification Shinichi Ota (JPN); Yuji Yamada (JPN); Hyun Byung-chul (KOR); Shi Qingyu (CHN); Kim Chi-bum (KOR); L	4

== Diving ==
Men

Athlete	Event	Preliminary		Final		Total score	Rank
Athlete	Event	Score	Rank	Score	Rank	Total score	Rank
Rossharisham Roslan	3 m springboard	224.46	6 Q	393.75	5	618.21	5
Yeoh Ken Nee	3 m springboard	235.05	5 Q	433.53	3	668.58	3rd place, bronze medalist(s)
Low Lap Bun	10 m platform	179.40	7 Q	345.75	10	525.15	10
Nor Aznizal Najib	10 m platform	175.68	9 Q	393.51	7	569.19	7
Rossharisham Roslan; Yeoh Ken Nee	3 m synchronised springboard	—N/a		298.08	3	298.08	3rd place, bronze medalist(s)
Low Lap Bun; Nor Aznizal Najib	10 m synchronised platform	—N/a		284.52	5	284.52	5

Women

Athlete	Event	Preliminary		Semifinal		Final		Total score	Rank
Athlete	Event	Score	Rank	Score	Rank	Score	Rank	Total score	Rank
Farah Begum Abdullah	3 m springboard	257.43	8 Q	194.70	9 Q	255.69	8	450.39	8
Leong Mun Yee	3 m springboard	274.20	5 Q	203.43	6 Q	269.94	5	473.37	5
Leong Mun Yee	10 m platform	—N/a		178.71	3 Q	287.19	9	465.90	6
Farah Begum Abdullah; Leong Mun Yee	3 m synchronised springboard	—N/a				245.34	3	245.34	3rd place, bronze medalist(s)

== Equestrian ==
Dressage

Athlete	Horse	Event	Qualification		Final	
Athlete	Horse	Event	% Score	Rank	% Score	Rank
Nur Quzandria Mahamad Fathil	Grey Cottage	Individual dressage	64.857	5 Q	64.595	5
Putri Alia Soraya	Chagall Junior	Individual dressage	63.714	8 Q	62.432	8

Jumping

Athlete	Horse	Event	Qualifier						Final					
Athlete	Horse	Event	First		Second		Total		First		Second		Total score	
Athlete	Horse	Event	Pen.	Rank	Pen.	Rank	Pen.	Rank	Pen.	Rank	Pen.	Rank	Pen.	Rank
Qabil Ambak Mahamad Fathil	Humpfry	Individual jumping	0	1 Q	0	1	0	1 Q	EL		did not advance			
Quzier Ambak Mahamad Fathil	Calano	Individual jumping	0	1 Q	4	9	4	6 Q	4	5 Q	10	12	14	10
Syed Omar Al-Mohdzar	O Canthus	Individual jumping	3	13 Q	4	9	7	13 Q	EL		did not advance			
Syed Zain Al-Mohdzar	Malibero	Individual jumping	4	14 Q	8	19	12	19	did not advance					
Qabil Ambak Mahamad Fathil; Quzier Ambak Mahamad Fathil; Syed Omar Al-Mohdzar; Syed Zain Al-Mohdzar	Humpfry; Calano; O Canthus; Malibero;	Team jumping	—N/a						3	3 Q	8	3	11	3rd place, bronze medalist(s)

== Field hockey ==
=== Men's tournament ===
Squad list	Preliminary league	Rank	Semifinal	Final	Rank
Amin Rahim; Azlan Misron; Chairil Anwar; Chua Boon Huat; Fairuz Ramli; Gobinathan Krishnamurthy; Keevan Raj Kali; Kuhan Shanmuganathan; Kumar Subramaniam; Madzli Ikmar; Megat Azrafiq Termizi; Norazlan Rahim; Redzuan Ponirin; Rodzhanizam Mat Radzi; Roslan Jamaluddin; Shaiful Azli	Bangladesh; W 6 – 1	2 Q	South Korea; L 0 – 2	Bronze medal match Pakistan; W 1 – 1 (a.e.t.); Penalties 4 – 2	6
Amin Rahim; Azlan Misron; Chairil Anwar; Chua Boon Huat; Fairuz Ramli; Gobinathan Krishnamurthy; Keevan Raj Kali; Kuhan Shanmuganathan; Kumar Subramaniam; Madzli Ikmar; Megat Azrafiq Termizi; Norazlan Rahim; Redzuan Ponirin; Rodzhanizam Mat Radzi; Roslan Jamaluddin; Shaiful Azli	China; W 3 – 2	2 Q	South Korea; L 0 – 2	Bronze medal match Pakistan; W 1 – 1 (a.e.t.); Penalties 4 – 2	6
Amin Rahim; Azlan Misron; Chairil Anwar; Chua Boon Huat; Fairuz Ramli; Gobinathan Krishnamurthy; Keevan Raj Kali; Kuhan Shanmuganathan; Kumar Subramaniam; Madzli Ikmar; Megat Azrafiq Termizi; Norazlan Rahim; Redzuan Ponirin; Rodzhanizam Mat Radzi; Roslan Jamaluddin; Shaiful Azli	Pakistan; L 1 – 6	2 Q	South Korea; L 0 – 2	Bronze medal match Pakistan; W 1 – 1 (a.e.t.); Penalties 4 – 2	6

== Football ==
=== Men's tournament ===
Squad list	Preliminary round		Quarterfinal	Semifinal	Final	Rank
Squad list	Group A	Rank	Quarterfinal	Semifinal	Final	Rank
	Oman; L 0 – 1 Mubarak 63'	3	Did not advance			
	Maldives; L 1 – 3 Jamlus 30', 32', 46'; Fazeel 79'	3	Did not advance			
	South Korea; L 0 – 4 Kim Eun-Jung 20', 72'; Choi Tae-Uk 36'; Lee Dong-Gook 90'	3	Did not advance			

== Golf ==
Men

Athlete	Event	Round 1	Round 2	Round 3	Round 4	Total Score	Par	Final rank
Athlete	Event	Score	Score	Score	Score	Total Score	Par	Final rank
Lim Eng Seng	Individual	83	78	77	78	316	+28	34
Shaaban Hussin	Individual	75	71	80	76	302	+14	14
Shaiful Saedin	Individual	75	75	79	84	313	+25	31
Siva Chandhran Supramaniam	Individual	77	75	82	75	309	+21	25
Lim Eng Seng; Shaaban Hussin; Shaiful Saedin; Siva Chandhran Supramaniam	Team	227	221	236	229	913	+49	8

== Gymnastics ==
=== Artistic ===
Men

Athlete	Event								
Athlete	Event	F Rank	PH Rank	R Rank	V Rank	PB Rank	HB Rank	Total	Rank
Loke Yik Siang	Qualification	8.750; 24	8.300; 32	9.000; 24	9.250; 23	8.725; 26	7.350; 37	51.375	19 Q
Ng Shu Wai	Qualification	8.700; 27	8.875; 27	8.400; 31	9.400; 4 Q	8.775; 25	8.600; 22	52.750	17 Q
Onn Kwang Tung	Qualification	7.900; 37	9.250; 20	7.500; 37	8.750; 38	8.350; 33	8.550; 23	50.300	21
Ooi Wei Siang	Qualification	8.300; 33	7.500; 38	8.150; 33	9.050; 31	8.500; 30	7.750; 33	49.250	23
Loke Yik Siang; Ng Shu Wai; Onn Kwang Tung; Ooi Wei Siang	Team all-around	33.650; 7	33.925; 7	33.050; 7	36.450; 7	34.350; 7	32.250; 7	203.675	7
Loke Yik Siang	Individual all-around	8.700; 14	8.550; 12	9.250; 7	9.250; 12	8.550; 12	8.250; 14	52.550	12
Ng Shu Wai	Individual all-around	9.100; 7	9.350; 7	8.450; 14	9.125; 15	8.525; 14	7.800; 15	52.350	13
Ng Shu Wai	Vault	—N/a			9.225; 7	—N/a		9.225	7

=== Rhythmic ===
Women

Athlete	Event	Qualification						Final					
Athlete	Event	Rope Rank	Hoop Rank	Ball Rank	Clubs Rank	Total	Rank	Rope Rank	Hoop Rank	Ball Rank	Clubs Rank	Total	Rank
Sarina Sundara Rajah	Individual all-around	20.150; 14	20.450; 15	21.550; 14	23.000; 9	65.000	14 Q	22.750; 7	23.300; 7	22.900; 9	22.250; 11	91.200	10

== Kabaddi ==
=== Men's tournament ===
Squad list	Round robin	Rank
Anatharaju Keresnan; Mahendran Kannaiah; Sivabalan Ramachandram; Thanaraj Sivelingam; Sivanesh Rajendran; Nagarajan Rajamanickam; Kumaresan Subramani; Mohanatas Balakerisnan; Rajendran Ramakrishnan; Balamurugan Rengasami Naidu; Balakrishnan Arumugam; Paramasiven Muniandy	(India) India; L 21 – 47	5
Anatharaju Keresnan; Mahendran Kannaiah; Sivabalan Ramachandram; Thanaraj Sivelingam; Sivanesh Rajendran; Nagarajan Rajamanickam; Kumaresan Subramani; Mohanatas Balakerisnan; Rajendran Ramakrishnan; Balamurugan Rengasami Naidu; Balakrishnan Arumugam; Paramasiven Muniandy	(Bangladesh) Bangladesh; L 7 – 46	5
Anatharaju Keresnan; Mahendran Kannaiah; Sivabalan Ramachandram; Thanaraj Sivelingam; Sivanesh Rajendran; Nagarajan Rajamanickam; Kumaresan Subramani; Mohanatas Balakerisnan; Rajendran Ramakrishnan; Balamurugan Rengasami Naidu; Balakrishnan Arumugam; Paramasiven Muniandy	(Sri Lanka) Sri Lanka; L 16 – 18	5
Anatharaju Keresnan; Mahendran Kannaiah; Sivabalan Ramachandram; Thanaraj Sivelingam; Sivanesh Rajendran; Nagarajan Rajamanickam; Kumaresan Subramani; Mohanatas Balakerisnan; Rajendran Ramakrishnan; Balamurugan Rengasami Naidu; Balakrishnan Arumugam; Paramasiven Muniandy	(Pakistan) Pakistan; L 7 – 49	5
Anatharaju Keresnan; Mahendran Kannaiah; Sivabalan Ramachandram; Thanaraj Sivelingam; Sivanesh Rajendran; Nagarajan Rajamanickam; Kumaresan Subramani; Mohanatas Balakerisnan; Rajendran Ramakrishnan; Balamurugan Rengasami Naidu; Balakrishnan Arumugam; Paramasiven Muniandy	(Japan) Japan; W 14 – 5	5

== Karate ==
Men

Athlete	Event	1/16 final	1/8 final	Quarterfinal	Semifinal	Final	Rank
Athlete	Event	Opposition Score	Opposition Score	Opposition Score	Opposition Score	Opposition Score	Rank
Ku Jin Keat	Individual kata	—N/a	Bye	Yukimitsu Hasegawa (JPN); L 1–2	Did not advance	Bronze medal match Wong Pan Pan (HKG); W 3–0	3rd place, bronze medalist(s)
Puvaneswaran Ramasamy	Kumite 55 kg	—N/a	Dilovar Sharipov (TJK); W 5–1	Phạm Trần Nguyên (VIE); W 5–3	Jeong Seong-hun (KOR); W 12–4	Gold medal match Otabek Kasimov (UZB); W 4–2	1st place, gold medalist(s)

Women

Athlete	Event	1/16 final	1/8 final	Quarterfinal	Semifinal	Final	Rank
Athlete	Event	Opposition Score	Opposition Score	Opposition Score	Opposition Score	Opposition Score	Rank
Lim Lee Lee	Individual kata	—N/a		Bye	Cheung Pui Si (MAC); W 5–0	Gold medal match Atsuko Wakai (JPN); L 0–3	2nd place, silver medalist(s)
Murugaiyan Srirajarajeswari	Kumite 53 kg	—N/a		Irina Tishina (KAZ); W 4–2	Eri Fujioka (JPN); L 6–10	Bronze medal match Nigora Tyuryaeva (TJK); W 5–1	3rd place, bronze medalist(s)
Premila Supramaniam	Kumite 60 kg	—N/a		Nguyễn Thị Thu Trang (VIE); W 1–0	Gretchen Malalad (PHI); W 4–2	Gold medal match Chan Ka Man (HKG); W 4–0	1st place, gold medalist(s)

== Rugby sevens ==
=== Men's tournament ===
Squad list	Preliminary round		Quarterfinal	Semifinal	Final	Rank
Squad list	Pool A	Rank	Quarterfinal	Semifinal	Final	Rank
Zamri Abdul Kahar; Khairul Azhar; Syaiful Basyar Azuan; Mohd Shahuddin Baharom; Badrul Hisham Basri; Nor Hazmin Chamili; Mohd Fazarul Helmi; Mazlan Ismail; Lee Wei Ming; Ahmad Farid Rahman; Ahmad Faizal Salim; Yusoff Shahrom	South Korea; L 5–31	4	Did not advance			
Zamri Abdul Kahar; Khairul Azhar; Syaiful Basyar Azuan; Mohd Shahuddin Baharom; Badrul Hisham Basri; Nor Hazmin Chamili; Mohd Fazarul Helmi; Mazlan Ismail; Lee Wei Ming; Ahmad Farid Rahman; Ahmad Faizal Salim; Yusoff Shahrom	Thailand; L 5–24	4	Did not advance			
Zamri Abdul Kahar; Khairul Azhar; Syaiful Basyar Azuan; Mohd Shahuddin Baharom; Badrul Hisham Basri; Nor Hazmin Chamili; Mohd Fazarul Helmi; Mazlan Ismail; Lee Wei Ming; Ahmad Farid Rahman; Ahmad Faizal Salim; Yusoff Shahrom	Sri Lanka; L 14–19	4	Did not advance			

== Sailing ==
Men

Athlete	Event	Race											Net points	Rank
Athlete	Event	1	2	3	4	5	6	7	8	9	10	11	Net points	Rank
Chew Xian Jian	Dinghy Optimist	~~5~~	3	1	2	~~6~~	2	3	4	4	5	4	28	4
Kevin Lim	Laser	~~3~~	2	~~3~~	3	2	2	2	2	1	1	CAN	15	2nd place, silver medalist(s)
Jeremy Koo; Looi Sing Yew	Double Handed Dinghy 420	~~6~~	4	~~6~~	6	6	2	4	3	6	6	CAN	37	6

Women

Athlete	Event	Race											Net points	Rank
Athlete	Event	1	2	3	4	5	6	7	8	9	10	11	Net points	Rank
Sandra Lili Yin	Dinghy Optimist	4	4	3	~~5~~	5	4	4	1	4	~~7~~	4	33	4
Tiffany Koo	Dinghy Europe	~~4~~	~~4~~	3	3	4	4	4	4	1	1	CAN	24	4
Patricia Kelly Yin; Winnie Abah	Double Handed Dinghy 420	5	5	5	~~7~~	6	4	7	1	2	CAN	CAN	35	6

== Sepaktakraw ==
Men

Squad list	Event	Preliminary		Semifinal	Final	Rank
Squad list	Event	Opposition Score	Rank	Opposition Score	Opposition Score	Rank
Azman Nasruddin; Ghazali Abdul Ghani; Mahadi Said; Suhaimi Mat Salim; Suhaimi Yusof; Zulkarnain Arif	Circle	981	6 Q	3519	did not advance	
Azman Nasruddin; Fauzi Ghadzali; Noor Ariffin Pawanteh; Suhaimi Mat Salim; Zulkarnain Arif	Regu	Singapore; W 19-21, 21-11, 15-10	1 Q	Myanmar; L 23-21, 18-21, 7-15	did not advance	3rd place, bronze medalist(s)
Azman Nasruddin; Fauzi Ghadzali; Noor Ariffin Pawanteh; Suhaimi Mat Salim; Zulkarnain Arif	Regu	South Korea; W 21-18, 21-19	1 Q	Myanmar; L 23-21, 18-21, 7-15	did not advance	3rd place, bronze medalist(s)
Azman Nasruddin; Fauzi Ghadzali; Noor Ariffin Pawanteh; Suhaimi Mat Salim; Zulkarnain Arif	Regu	Philippines; W W/O	1 Q	Myanmar; L 23-21, 18-21, 7-15	did not advance	3rd place, bronze medalist(s)
Ahmad Ezzat Zaki; Azman Nasruddin; Fauzi Ghadzali; Noor Ariffin Pawanteh; Rukman Mustapha; Suhaimi Mat Salim; Suhaimi Yusof; Zabidi Shariff; Zulkarnain Arif	Team	Myanmar; W 21-14, 17-21, 15-13; 21-18, 21-16; 21-12, 21-16	1 Q	Thailand; W 21-19, 21-16; 21-15, 21-10; 21-8, 21-13	Gold medal match Thailand; L 17-21, 8-21; 10-21, 14-21	2nd place, silver medalist(s)
Ahmad Ezzat Zaki; Azman Nasruddin; Fauzi Ghadzali; Noor Ariffin Pawanteh; Rukman Mustapha; Suhaimi Mat Salim; Suhaimi Yusof; Zabidi Shariff; Zulkarnain Arif	Team	Brunei; W 21-11, 19-21, 15-10; 21-17, 21-8; 21-15, 21-13	1 Q	Thailand; W 21-19, 21-16; 21-15, 21-10; 21-8, 21-13	Gold medal match Thailand; L 17-21, 8-21; 10-21, 14-21	2nd place, silver medalist(s)

== Shooting ==
Men

Athlete	Event	Qualification		Final	
Athlete	Event	Score	Rank	Score	Rank
Mohamed Hameleay Abdul Mutalib	10 m air rifle	592	9	did not advance	
Mohammed Emran Zakaria	10 m air rifle	580	25	did not advance	
Mohd Sabki Mohd Din	10 m air rifle	579	30	did not advance	
Mohamed Hameleay Abdul Mutalib; Mohammed Emran Zakaria; Mohd Sabki Mohd Din	10 m air rifle team	—N/a		1751	7
Mohamed Hameleay Abdul Mutalib	50 m rifle prone	583	36	did not advance	
Mohammed Emran Zakaria	50 m rifle prone	583	36	did not advance	
Mohd Sabki Mohd Din	50 m rifle prone	584	30	did not advance	
Mohamed Hameleay Abdul Mutalib; Mohammed Emran Zakaria; Mohd Sabki Mohd Din	50 m rifle prone team	—N/a		1750	12
Mohamed Hameleay Abdul Mutalib	50 m rifle three positions	1139	23	did not advance	
Mohammed Emran Zakaria	50 m rifle three positions	1146	15	did not advance	
Mohd Sabki Mohd Din	50 m rifle three positions	1135	27	did not advance	
Mohamed Hameleay Abdul Mutalib; Mohammed Emran Zakaria; Mohd Sabki Mohd Din	50 m rifle three positions team	—N/a		3420	7
Richard Cheong Yew Kwan	Skeet	113	19	did not advance	

Women

Athlete	Event	Qualification		Final	
Athlete	Event	Score	Rank	Score	Rank
Nor Dalilah Abu Bakar	10 m air rifle	388	20	did not advance	
Nurul Huda Baharin	10 m air rifle	393	12	did not advance	
Roslina Bakar	10 m air rifle	379	31	did not advance	
Nor Dalilah Abu Bakar; Nurul Huda Baharin; Roslina Bakar	10 m air rifle team	—N/a		1160	7
Nor Dalilah Abu Bakar	50 m rifle prone	—N/a		578	28
Nurul Huda Baharin	50 m rifle prone	—N/a		588	10
Roslina Bakar	50 m rifle prone	—N/a		582	21
Nor Dalilah Abu Bakar; Nurul Huda Baharin; Roslina Bakar	50 m rifle prone team	—N/a		1748	5
Nor Dalilah Abu Bakar	50 m rifle 3 positions	563	25	did not advance	
Nurul Huda Baharin	50 m rifle 3 positions	580	6 Q	676.2; S-off 8.9	7
Roslina Bakar	50 m rifle 3 positions	565	22	did not advance	
Nor Dalilah Abu Bakar; Nurul Huda Baharin; Roslina Bakar	50 m rifle 3 positions team	—N/a		1708	6

== Squash ==
Individual

Athlete	Event	Round of 32	Round of 16	Quarterfinal	Semifinal	Final	
Athlete	Event	Opposition Score	Opposition Score	Opposition Score	Opposition Score	Opposition Score	Rank
Mohd Azlan Iskandar (4)	Men's singles	Bye	Zeyad Al-Owayish (KUW); W 9–0, 9–4, 9–2	Ritwik Bhattacharya (IND); W 10–9, 9–6, 4–9, 5–9, 9–3	Mansoor Zaman (PAK); L 2–9, 2–9, 9–3, 2–9	Did not advance	3rd place, bronze medalist(s)
Ong Beng Hee (1)	Men's singles	Bye	Saoud Al-Sulaiti (QAT); W 9–4, 9–0, 9–6	Faisal Sarkhouh (KUW); W 9–4, 9–1, 9–0	Shahid Zaman (PAK); W 9–6, 6–9, 4–9, 9–7, 9–4	Gold medal match Mansoor Zaman (PAK); W 9–0, 9–7, 9–0	1st place, gold medalist(s)
Nicol David (1)	Women's singles	—N/a	Bye	Christina Mak (HKG); W 9–5, 9–6, 9–1	Lee Hai-kyung (KOR); W 9–5, 10–8, 9–2	Gold medal match Rebecca Chiu (HKG); L 7–9, 5–9, 7–9	2nd place, silver medalist(s)
Sharon Wee (3)	Women's singles	—N/a	Tehani Guruge (SRI); W 9–0, 9–1, 9–1	Joshna Chinappa (IND); W 9–1, 9–1, 9–6	Rebecca Chiu (HKG); L 9–2, 1–9, 1–9, 2–9	Did not advance	3rd place, bronze medalist(s)

== Swimming ==
Men

Athlete	Event	Heat		Final	
Athlete	Event	Time	Rank	Time	Rank
Allen Ong	50 m freestyle	23.62	7 Q	23.62	7
Lubrey Lim Yu Lung	50 m freestyle	24.89	22	did not advance	
Allen Ong	100 m freestyle	51.74	3 Q	52.27	8
Wong Tuck Kar	100 m freestyle	54.86	20	did not advance	
Wong Tuck Kar	200 m freestyle	2:02.02	16 qB	did not start	
Alex Lim	100 m backstroke	56.70	3 Q	55.18	2nd place, silver medalist(s)
Alex Lim	200 m backstroke	2:09.82	5 Q	2:01.97	5
Elvin Chia	100 m breaststroke	1:04.51	6 Q	1:04.22	5
Elvin Chia	200 m breaststroke	did not start		did not advance	
Lubrey Lim Yu Lung	100 m butterfly	56.69	8 Q	57.09	8
Alex Lim; Allen Ong; Elvin Chia; Lubrey Lim Yu Lung	4 × 100 m medley relay	3:53.69	4 Q	3:47.07	4

Women

Athlete	Event	Heat		Final	
Athlete	Event	Time	Rank	Time	Rank
Sia Wai Yen	800 m freestyle	—N/a		9:10.56	7
Sia Wai Yen	200 m backstroke	2:25.61	9	did not advance	
Siow Yi Ting	100 m breaststroke	1:15.66	13	did not advance	
Siow Yi Ting	200 m breaststroke	2:38.11	6 Q	2:37.04	7
Sia Wai Yen	400 m individual medley	5:02.92	7 Q	5:06.20	7

== Taekwondo ==
Men

Athlete	Event	1/16 final	1/8 final	Quarterfinal	Semifinal	Final	Rank
Athlete	Event	Opposition Score	Opposition Score	Opposition Score	Opposition Score	Opposition Score	Rank
Shahidinshah Mohd Farook	Finweight (54 kg)	Phichet Phibunkhanarak (THA); L 2 – 6	did not advance				
Benjamin Raj Anthonysamy	Bantamweight (62 kg)	Wichit Sittikun (THA); L 4 – 4	did not advance				

Women

Athlete	Event	1/16 final	1/8 final	Quarterfinal	Semifinal	Final	Rank
Athlete	Event	Opposition Score	Opposition Score	Opposition Score	Opposition Score	Opposition Score	Rank
Elaine Teo	Bantamweight (55 kg)	—N/a	Hakima Khashai (AFG); W 14 – 0	Yun Kyung-rim (KOR); L 1 – 4	did not advance		
Lee Pei Fen	Lightweight (63 kg)	—N/a		Fatima Hamidi (AFG); W 8 – 0	Kim Yeon-ji (KOR); L 0 – 6	Did not advance	3rd place, bronze medalist(s)
Lee Wan Yuen	Heavyweight (+72 kg)	—N/a		Bye	Wang I-hsien (TPE); L 4 – 5	Did not advance	3rd place, bronze medalist(s)

== Weightlifting ==
Men

Athlete	Event	Snatch		Clean & Jerk		Total	Rank
Athlete	Event	Result	Rank	Result	Rank	Total	Rank
Amirul Hamizan Ibrahim	56 kg	117.5	5	142.5	7	260.0	7

== Wushu ==
Taolu

Athlete	Event	Changquan Score Rank	Daoshu Score Rank	Gunshu Score Rank	Total	Rank
Lim Kim	Men's changquan	9.21; 7	8.95; 15	9.26; 9	27.42	12
Oh Poh Soon	Men's changquan	9.16; 10	9.25; 9	9.28; 7	27.69	7

Athlete	Event	Qiangshu Score Rank	Changquan Score Rank	Jianshu Score Rank	Total	Rank
Hiew Siaw Fang	Women's changquan	9.18; 6	8.63; 13	9.16; 12	26.97	11
Jong Yen Lu	Women's changquan	9.11; 12	8.40; 14	9.16; 12	26.67	13

Athlete	Event	Nanquan Score Rank	Nandao Score Rank	Nangun Score Rank	Total	Rank
Ho Ro Bin	Men's nanquan	9.45; 1	9.40; 2	9.43; 1	28.28	1st place, gold medalist(s)
Voon Keh Li	Women's nanquan	9.18; 9	9.18; 9	9.20; 9	27.56	9

Athlete	Event	Taijiquan Score Rank	Taijijian Score Rank	Total	Rank
Choo Ee Wee	Men's taijiquan	8.96; 11	8.91; 11	17.87	11
Wong Pei Ling	Women's taijiquan	9.35; 10	9.30; 8	18.65	8
