= Diving at the 2002 Asian Games – Women's synchronized 10 metre platform =

Women's synchronized 10 metre platform at the 2002 Asian Games
- Venue: Sajik Swimming Pool
- Date: 9 October 2002
- Competitors: 10 from 5 nations

Medalists
gold medal	Duan Qing; Li Ting	China
silver medal	Kim Kyong-ju; Jon Hyon-ju	North Korea
bronze medal	Emi Otsuki; Takiri Miyazaki	Japan

The women's synchronised 10 metre platform diving competition at the 2002 Asian Games in Busan was held on 9 October at the Sajik Swimming Pool.

== Schedule ==
All times are Korea Standard Time (UTC+09:00)

Date	Time	Event
Wednesday, 9 October 2002	19:00	Final

== Results ==
Rank	Team	Dive					Total
Rank	Team	1	2	3	4	5	Total
1st place, gold medalist(s)	China (CHN); Duan Qing; Li Ting	50.40	52.20	70.56	72.00	70.20	315.36
2nd place, silver medalist(s)	North Korea (PRK); Kim Kyong-ju; Jon Hyon-ju	45.60	49.20	70.20	71.04	62.16	298.20
3rd place, bronze medalist(s)	Japan (JPN); Emi Otsuki; Takiri Miyazaki	46.20	48.00	57.96	57.96	65.25	275.37
4	South Korea (KOR); Choi Hye-jin; Im Sung-young	46.80	46.20	57.51	55.68	58.80	264.99
5	Indonesia (INA); Shenny Ratna Amelia; Herlyani Dias Sukmahati	43.20	45.00	45.24	60.30	65.28	259.02
