= Diving at the 2002 Asian Games – Women's 10 metre platform =

Women's 10 metre platform at the 2002 Asian Games
- Venue: Sajik Swimming Pool
- Date: 12 October 2002
- Competitors: 12 from 8 nations

Medalists
gold medal	Lao Lishi	China
silver medal	Li Na	China
bronze medal	Kim Kyong-ju	North Korea

The women's 10-metre platform diving competition at the 2002 Asian Games in Busan was held on 12 October at the Sajik Swimming Pool.

== Schedule ==
All times are Korea Standard Time (UTC+09:00)

Date	Time	Event
Saturday, 12 October 2002	10:00	Semifinal
Saturday, 12 October 2002	19:00	Final

== Results ==
=== Semifinal ===
Rank	Athlete	Score
1	Li Na (CHN)	199.80
2	Lao Lishi (CHN)	195.36
3	Leong Mun Yee (MAS)	178.71
4	Im Sung-young (KOR)	177.45
5	Kim Kyong-ju (PRK)	176.10
6	Takiri Miyazaki (JPN)	175.89
7	Jon Hyon-ju (PRK)	170.49
8	Olga Khristoforova (KAZ)	169.74
9	Emi Otsuki (JPN)	166.98
10	Shenny Ratna Amelia (INA)	165.27
11	Hsieh Pei-hua (TPE)	159.21
12	Choi Hye-jin (KOR)	154.29

=== Final ===
Rank	Athlete	SF	Dive					Final	Total
Rank	Athlete	SF	1	2	3	4	5	Final	Total
1st place, gold medalist(s)	Lao Lishi (CHN)	195.36	74.70	84.48	79.68	69.30	79.56	387.72	583.08
2nd place, silver medalist(s)	Li Na (CHN)	199.80	73.92	69.66	80.91	60.30	82.56	367.35	567.15
3rd place, bronze medalist(s)	Kim Kyong-ju (PRK)	176.10	45.90	77.22	66.24	65.61	64.68	319.65	495.75
4	Takiri Miyazaki (JPN)	175.89	63.00	62.64	66.60	63.18	62.16	317.58	493.47
5	Olga Khristoforova (KAZ)	169.74	60.30	61.56	45.24	56.28	73.92	297.30	467.04
6	Leong Mun Yee (MAS)	178.71	59.94	64.68	52.20	52.65	57.72	287.19	465.90
7	Im Sung-young (KOR)	177.45	68.04	52.20	51.03	55.38	61.32	287.97	465.42
6	Jon Hyon-ju (PRK)	170.49	63.90	28.71	73.92	66.42	60.03	292.98	463.47
7	Hsieh Pei-hua (TPE)	159.21	59.64	58.50	56.55	55.08	62.64	292.41	451.62
10	Shenny Ratna Amelia (INA)	165.27	56.94	66.60	39.36	48.60	62.37	273.87	439.14
11	Choi Hye-jin (KOR)	154.29	64.80	53.94	36.12	63.84	53.28	271.98	426.27
12	Emi Otsuki (JPN)	166.98	59.64	29.40	36.54	66.60	62.37	254.55	421.53
