= Squash at the 2006 Asian Games – Men's singles =

Men's singles at the 2006 Asian Games
- Venue: Khalifa International Tennis and Squash Complex
- Dates: 10–14 December 2006
- Competitors: 27 from 15 nations

Medalists
gold medal	Ong Beng Hee	Malaysia
silver medal	Mohd Azlan Iskandar	Malaysia
bronze medal	Mansoor Zaman	Pakistan
bronze medal	Saurav Ghosal	India

The men's singles Squash event was part of the squash programme and took place between December 10 and 14, at the Khalifa International Tennis and Squash Complex.

== Schedule ==
All times are Arabia Standard Time (UTC+03:00)

Date	Time	Event
Sunday, 10 December 2006	15:00	Round 1
Monday, 11 December 2006	15:00	Round 2
Tuesday, 12 December 2006	14:00	Quarterfinals
Wednesday, 13 December 2006	18:00	Semifinals
Thursday, 14 December 2006	19:00	Final

== Results ==
Legend

- WO — Won by walkover

=== Finals ===
Semifinals					Final
1	Mohd Azlan Iskandar (MAS)	10	9	9
3	Mansoor Zaman (PAK)	8	6	7	1	Mohd Azlan Iskandar (MAS)	9	1	9	5
6	Saurav Ghosal (IND)	6	1	3	2	Ong Beng Hee (MAS)	5	9	10	9
2	Ong Beng Hee (MAS)	9	9	9

=== Top half ===
==== Section 1 ====
Round 1
Hussain Khalil (BRN)	5	1	4
Kim Sung-young (KOR)	9	9	9
Navin Samarasinghe (SRI)	9	9	9
Ali Adnan (IRQ)	4	7	0
Ali Al-Miski (LIB)	0	0	1
5	Aamir Atlas Khan (PAK)	9	9	9

Round 2
1	Mohd Azlan Iskandar (MAS)	9	9	9
Kim Sung-young (KOR)	3	2	0
Navin Samarasinghe (SRI)	2	0	5
5	Aamir Atlas Khan (PAK)	9	9	9

Quarterfinals
1	Mohd Azlan Iskandar (MAS)	9	9	9
5	Aamir Atlas Khan (PAK)	7	5	2

==== Section 2 ====
Round 1
7	Wong Wai Hang (HKG)	9	9	9
Abdulrahman Al-Malki (QAT)	0	0	0
Sun Kin Peng (MAC)	9	3	9	9
Michel Al-Zinati (LIB)	4	9	7	4
Ricky Espinola (PHI)	W	O
Mohammad Al-Zubaidi (JOR)

Round 2
7	Wong Wai Hang (HKG)	9	9	9
Sun Kin Peng (MAC)	1	3	2
Ricky Espinola (PHI)	0	1	0
3	Mansoor Zaman (PAK)	9	9	9

Quarterfinals
7	Wong Wai Hang (HKG)	7	5	8
3	Mansoor Zaman (PAK)	9	9	10

=== Bottom half ===
==== Section 3 ====
Round 1
Eyad Al-Samheeji (BRN)	2	3	3
Eranga Alwis (SRI)	9	9	9
Kim Dong-woo (KOR)	9	9	9
Abdulhadi Al-Marri (QAT)	1	1	4
Armando Amante (MAC)	0	3	0
6	Saurav Ghosal (IND)	9	9	9

Round 2
4	Ritwik Bhattacharya (IND)	9	9	9
Eranga Alwis (SRI)	1	2	1
Kim Dong-woo (KOR)	0	3	1
6	Saurav Ghosal (IND)	9	9	9

Quarterfinals
4	Ritwik Bhattacharya (IND)	4	0	9	7
6	Saurav Ghosal (IND)	9	9	6	9

==== Section 4 ====
Round 1
8	Ali Al-Ramezi (KUW)	9	9	9
Robert Garcia (PHI)	2	4	5
Ahmad Al-Zubaidi (JOR)	W	O
Cai Pinghua (CHN)	W	O

Round 2
8	Ali Al-Ramezi (KUW)	2	9	2	9	9
Roger Ngan (HKG)	9	1	9	2	1
Bye
2	Ong Beng Hee (MAS)

Quarterfinals
8	Ali Al-Ramezi (KUW)	6	1	0
2	Ong Beng Hee (MAS)	9	9	9
