= Cycling at the 2002 Asian Games – Men's keirin =

Men's keirin at the 2002 Asian Games
- Venue: Geumjeong Velodrome
- Date: 7–8 October 2002
- Competitors: 15 from 8 nations

Medalists
gold medal	Shinichi Ota	Japan
silver medal	Yuji Yamada	Japan
bronze medal	Hyun Byung-chul	South Korea

The men's keirin competition at the 2002 Asian Games was held on 4 and 5 October at the Geumjeong Velodrome.

== Schedule ==
All times are Korea Standard Time (UTC+09:00)

Date	Time	Event
Monday, 7 October 2002	17:00	Qualification
Monday, 7 October 2002	17:30	Repechage
Monday, 7 October 2002	21:10	Semifinals
Tuesday, 8 October 2002	10:00	Finals

== Results ==
Legend

- DNF — Did not finish
- DNS — Did not start
- DSQ — Disqualified

=== Qualification ===
==== Heat 1 ====
Rank	Athlete	Time
1	Shinichi Ota (JPN)	11.149
2	Lin Chih-hsan (TPE)	
3	Samai Amari (INA)	
4	Domino Chau (HKG)	
5	Yan Liheng (CHN)	DNF

==== Heat 2 ====
Rank	Athlete	Time
1	Yuji Yamada (JPN)	11.317
2	Fairuz Izni Abdul Ghani (MAS)	
3	Hyun Byung-chul (KOR)	
4	Bryan Dimacali (PHI)	
5	Chester Lam (HKG)	

==== Heat 3 ====
Rank	Athlete	Time
1	Kim Chi-bum (KOR)	11.483
2	Shi Qingyu (CHN)	
3	Josiah Ng (MAS)	
4	Wawan Setyobudi (INA)	
5	Wu Hsien-tang (TPE)	

=== Repechage ===
Rank	Athlete	Time
1	Wawan Setyobudi (INA)	11.925
2	Wu Hsien-tang (TPE)	
3	Chester Lam (HKG)	
4	Yan Liheng (CHN)	
5	Bryan Dimacali (PHI)	
6	Domino Chau (HKG)	

=== Semifinals ===
==== Heat 1 ====
Rank	Athlete	Time
1	Shinichi Ota (JPN)	11.308
2	Hyun Byung-chul (KOR)	
3	Shi Qingyu (CHN)	
4	Wu Hsien-tang (TPE)	
5	Fairuz Izni Abdul Ghani (MAS)	
6	Wawan Setyobudi (INA)	DNF

==== Heat 2 ====
Rank	Athlete	Time
1	Yuji Yamada (JPN)	11.774
2	Josiah Ng (MAS)	
3	Kim Chi-bum (KOR)	
4	Lin Chih-hsan (TPE)	
5	Chester Lam (HKG)	
6	Samai Amari (INA)	

=== Finals ===
==== Final (7~12) ====
Rank	Athlete	Time
1	Chester Lam (HKG)	12.006
2	Fairuz Izni Abdul Ghani (MAS)	
—	Wu Hsien-tang (TPE)	DNS
—	Lin Chih-hsan (TPE)	DNS
—	Wawan Setyobudi (INA)	DSQ
—	Samai Amari (INA)	DSQ

==== Final (1~6) ====
Rank	Athlete	Time
1st place, gold medalist(s)	Shinichi Ota (JPN)	11.114
2nd place, silver medalist(s)	Yuji Yamada (JPN)	
3rd place, bronze medalist(s)	Hyun Byung-chul (KOR)	
4	Josiah Ng (MAS)	
5	Shi Qingyu (CHN)	
6	Kim Chi-bum (KOR)	

== Final standing ==
Rank	Athlete
1st place, gold medalist(s)	Shinichi Ota (JPN)
2nd place, silver medalist(s)	Yuji Yamada (JPN)
3rd place, bronze medalist(s)	Hyun Byung-chul (KOR)
4	Josiah Ng (MAS)
5	Shi Qingyu (CHN)
6	Kim Chi-bum (KOR)
7	Chester Lam (HKG)
8	Fairuz Izni Abdul Ghani (MAS)
9	Wu Hsien-tang (TPE)
9	Lin Chih-hsan (TPE)
11	Yan Liheng (CHN)
12	Bryan Dimacali (PHI)
13	Domino Chau (HKG)
—	Wawan Setyobudi (INA)
—	Samai Amari (INA)
