= Squash at the 2002 Asian Games – Men's singles =

Men's singles at the 2002 Asian Games
- Venue: Yangsan College Gymnasium
- Dates: 30 September – 4 October 2002
- Competitors: 18 from 11 nations

Medalists
gold medal	Ong Beng Hee	Malaysia
silver medal	Mansoor Zaman	Pakistan
bronze medal	Shahid Zaman	Pakistan
bronze medal	Mohd Azlan Iskandar	Malaysia

The men's singles Squash event was part of the squash programme at the 2002 Asian Games and took place from September 30 to October 4, at the Yangsan College Gymnasium.

== Schedule ==
All times are Korea Standard Time (UTC+09:00)

Date	Time	Event
Monday, 30 September 2002	12:00	1/16 finals
Tuesday, 1 October 2002	10:30	1/8 finals
Wednesday, 2 October 2002	13:30	Quarterfinals
Thursday, 3 October 2002	13:30	Semifinals
Friday, 4 October 2002	14:30	Final

== Results ==
Legend

- WO — Won by walkover

=== Finals ===
Semifinals							Final
1	Ong Beng Hee (MAS)	9	6	4	9	9
3	Shahid Zaman (PAK)	6	9	9	7	4	1	Ong Beng Hee (MAS)	9	9	9
4	Mohd Azlan Iskandar (MAS)	2	2	9	2		2	Mansoor Zaman (PAK)	0	7	0
2	Mansoor Zaman (PAK)	9	9	3	9

=== Top half ===
==== Section 1 ====
1/16 finals						1/8 finals					Quarterfinals
						1	Ong Beng Hee (MAS)	9	9	9
Saoud Al-Sulaiti (QAT)	3	9	1	9	10		Saoud Al-Sulaiti (QAT)	4	0	6
Saurav Ghosal (IND)	9	6	9	6	8						1	Ong Beng Hee (MAS)	9	9	9
											6	Faisal Sarkhouh (KUW)	4	1	0
							Lee Yong-hee (KOR)	3	7	0
						6	Faisal Sarkhouh (KUW)	9	9	9

==== Section 2 ====
1/16 finals	1/8 finals						Quarterfinals
	8	Abdul Faheem Khan (HKG)	9	9	9
		Ricky Espinola (PHI)	0	0	1
							8	Abdul Faheem Khan (HKG)	2	9	4
							3	Shahid Zaman (PAK)	9	10	9
		Mohammad Al-Said (JOR)	6	1	9	4
	3	Shahid Zaman (PAK)	9	9	6	9

=== Bottom half ===
==== Section 3 ====
1/16 finals	1/8 finals					Quarterfinals
	4	Mohd Azlan Iskandar (MAS)	9	9	9
		Zeyad Al-Owayish (KUW)	0	4	2
						4	Mohd Azlan Iskandar (MAS)	10	9	4	5	9
						5	Ritwik Bhattacharya (IND)	9	6	9	9	3
		Liu Qiwen (CHN)	0	0	0
	5	Ritwik Bhattacharya (IND)	9	9	9

==== Section 4 ====
1/16 finals			1/8 finals					Quarterfinals
				Wong Wai Hang (HKG)	9	9	9
			7	Yoshihiro Watanabe (JPN)	1	0	7
									Wong Wai Hang (HKG)	9	4	1
Ali Al-Qashoti (QAT)								2	Mansoor Zaman (PAK)	10	9	9
Kim Dong-woo (KOR)	W	O		Kim Dong-woo (KOR)	1	0	1
			2	Mansoor Zaman (PAK)	9	9	9
