= Squash at the 2002 Asian Games =

Asian Games squash event

- Venue: Yangsan College Gymnasium
- Dates: 30 September – 4 October 2002
- Competitors: 32 from 13 nations

The Squash events at the 2002 Asian Games were contested from September 30 to October 4 in Busan, South Korea. The competition consisted of men's and women's singles competition, with all the matches played at the Yangsan College Gymnasium.

Ong Beng Hee of Malaysia won the men's gold medal while Rebecca Chiu from Hong Kong won the women's competition.

== Schedule ==
P	Preliminary rounds	¼	Quarterfinals	½	Semifinals	F	Final

Event↓/Date →	30th Mon	1st Tue	2nd Wed	3rd Thu	4th Fri
Men's singles	P	P	¼	½	F
Women's singles	P		¼	½	F

== Medalists ==
Event	Gold	Silver	Bronze
Men's singles	Ong Beng Hee; Malaysia	Mansoor Zaman; Pakistan	Shahid Zaman; Pakistan
Men's singles	Ong Beng Hee; Malaysia	Mansoor Zaman; Pakistan	Mohd Azlan Iskandar; Malaysia
Women's singles	Rebecca Chiu; Hong Kong	Nicol David; Malaysia	Lee Hai-kyung; South Korea
Women's singles	Rebecca Chiu; Hong Kong	Nicol David; Malaysia	Sharon Wee; Malaysia

== Medal table ==
Rank	Nation	Gold	Silver	Bronze	Total
1	Malaysia (MAS)	1	1	2	4
2	Hong Kong (HKG)	1	0	0	1
3	Pakistan (PAK)	0	1	1	2
4	South Korea (KOR)	0	0	1	1
Totals (4 entries)		2	2	4	8

== Participating nations ==
A total of 32 athletes from 13 nations competed in squash at the 2002 Asian Games:

- China (2)
- Hong Kong (4)
- India (4)
- Japan (3)
- Jordan (1)
- Kuwait (2)
- Malaysia (4)
- Pakistan (2)
- Philippines (1)
- Qatar (2)
- Singapore (1)
- South Korea (4)
- Sri Lanka (2)
