= Shooting at the 2002 Asian Games – Men's 10 metre air rifle =

Men's 10 metre air rifle at the 2002 Asian Games
- Venue: Changwon International Shooting Range
- Dates: 2 October 2002
- Competitors: 51 from 20 nations

Medalists
gold medal	Li Jie	China
silver medal	Zhang Fu	China
bronze medal	Naoki Isobe	Japan

The men's 10 metre air rifle competition at the 2002 Asian Games in Busan, South Korea was held on 2 October at the Changwon International Shooting Range.

== Schedule ==
All times are Korea Standard Time (UTC+09:00)

Date	Time	Event
Wednesday, 2 October 2002	11:00	Qualification
Wednesday, 2 October 2002	14:00	Final

== Records ==
Prior to this competition, the existing world, Asian and Games records were as follows.

Qualification
World Record	Tevarit Majchacheep (THA)	600	Langkawi, Malaysia	27 January 2000
Asian Record	Tevarit Majchacheep (THA)	600	Langkawi, Malaysia	27 January 2000
Games Record	Masaru Yanagida (JPN)	597	Bangkok, Thailand	10 December 1998
Final
World Record	Leif Rolland (NOR)	702.4	Seoul, South Korea	13 May 2001
Asian Record	Qiu Jian (CHN)	701.5	Munich, Germany	10 June 2001
Games Record	Cai Yalin (CHN)	696.8	Bangkok, Thailand	10 December 1998

== Results ==
=== Qualification ===
Rank	Athlete	Series						Total	Notes
Rank	Athlete	1	2	3	4	5	6	Total	Notes
1	Li Jie (CHN)	99	99	99	100	100	100	597	
2	Zhang Fu (CHN)	99	99	100	100	99	99	596	
3	Cai Yalin (CHN)	98	99	100	100	99	99	595	
4	Lim Young-sueb (KOR)	99	99	100	99	99	98	594	
5	Naoki Isobe (JPN)	99	99	100	100	98	98	594	
6	Yuri Lomov (KGZ)	99	98	98	100	99	99	593	
7	Abhinav Bindra (IND)	100	100	99	100	97	97	593	
8	Takayuki Okada (JPN)	99	97	99	99	98	100	592	
9	Mohd Hameleay Mutalib (MAS)	100	98	99	99	99	97	592	
10	Sameer Ambekar (IND)	97	96	99	99	100	100	591	
10	Tevarit Majchacheep (THA)	98	99	97	99	98	100	591	
12	Asif Hossain Khan (BAN)	99	97	98	99	99	98	590	
13	Kim Byung-eun (KOR)	96	98	98	100	98	99	589	
13	Lee Woo-jeong (KOR)	99	97	97	99	98	99	589	
15	Vyacheslav Skoromnov (UZB)	100	96	98	99	98	97	588	
16	Ehsan Homayouni (IRI)	96	99	99	98	97	98	587	
17	Masaru Yanagida (JPN)	98	96	97	98	98	99	586	
18	Ivan Shakhov (UZB)	97	98	96	99	98	97	585	
19	Olzodyn Enkhsaikhan (MGL)	98	96	99	95	98	98	584	
19	Emerito Concepcion (PHI)	99	98	98	95	99	95	584	
19	Igor Pirekeýew (TKM)	99	98	97	98	97	95	584	
22	Thanapat Thananchai (THA)	96	98	96	98	99	96	583	
23	Yuriy Melsitov (KAZ)	97	96	98	96	99	96	582	
24	Sergey Kharitonov (UZB)	98	97	95	100	96	95	581	
25	Mohammad Uzzaman (BAN)	97	96	97	95	97	98	580	
25	Bharat Singh (IND)	94	96	99	98	95	98	580	
25	Aleksandr Babchenko (KGZ)	97	95	97	99	96	96	580	
25	Emran Zakaria (MAS)	98	95	95	97	100	95	580	
25	Tsedevdorjiin Mönkh-Erdene (MGL)	98	98	99	96	95	94	580	
30	Nopdao Rueanprang (THA)	96	95	96	96	98	98	579	
30	Sabki Mohd Din (MAS)	96	97	98	96	94	98	579	
30	Khalaf Al-Khatri (OMA)	94	96	97	99	96	97	579	
30	Dawood Muhammad Zai (PAK)	97	98	96	95	97	96	579	
30	Hossein Jahanmiri (IRI)	95	96	97	98	98	95	579	
35	Mohammed Al-Hanai (OMA)	96	97	97	96	96	95	577	
36	Husain Al-Ajmi (KUW)	97	95	98	96	94	96	576	
37	Abdulnasser Al-Shaiba (QAT)	93	96	95	96	95	98	573	
37	Abdulla Al-Ahmad (QAT)	94	97	94	95	96	97	573	
39	Nergüin Enkhbaatar (MGL)	93	94	94	98	97	96	572	
39	Alexandr Shishigin (KAZ)	95	96	96	94	96	95	572	
39	Tachir Ismailov (KGZ)	96	92	97	97	95	95	572	
42	Anwer Zaman (BAN)	95	94	96	95	93	97	570	
42	Tika Shrestha (NEP)	96	92	94	96	97	95	570	
44	Reza Ahmadi (IRI)	96	94	97	94	96	92	569	
44	Meshal Al-Tahous (KUW)	95	97	94	97	94	92	569	
46	Vitaliy Dovgun (KAZ)	95	98	92	96	94	93	568	
47	Khaled Al-Subaie (KUW)	93	94	96	93	95	95	566	
48	Dadallah Al-Bulushi (OMA)	95	94	91	96	96	92	564	
49	Ayaz Tahir (PAK)	92	93	96	93	89	93	556	
50	Saleh Mohamed (BRN)	95	90	91	93	94	92	555	
51	Abdulla Zaman (BRN)	89	92	96	91	91	92	551	

=== Final ===
Rank	Athlete	Qual.	Final											Total	S-off	Notes
Rank	Athlete	Qual.	1	2	3	4	5	6	7	8	9	10	Total	Total	S-off	Notes
1st place, gold medalist(s)	Li Jie (CHN)	597	10.5	10.1	10.7	10.1	10.2	10.6	10.7	10.2	10.8	9.9	103.8	700.8		GR
2nd place, silver medalist(s)	Zhang Fu (CHN)	596	9.9	10.7	10.1	10.2	10.5	9.9	10.5	10.2	10.0	10.5	102.5	698.5		
3rd place, bronze medalist(s)	Naoki Isobe (JPN)	594	10.3	10.2	10.3	10.8	10.1	10.6	10.4	10.2	9.8	10.0	102.7	696.7		
4	Cai Yalin (CHN)	595	9.6	10.6	9.8	9.6	10.1	10.6	10.6	10.5	9.9	10.1	101.4	696.4		
5	Takayuki Okada (JPN)	592	10.1	10.1	9.9	10.6	9.9	10.4	10.8	10.2	10.7	10.3	103.0	695.0		
6	Yuri Lomov (KGZ)	593	10.2	10.6	9.7	8.8	10.5	10.6	10.4	9.7	10.8	10.6	101.9	694.9		
7	Abhinav Bindra (IND)	593	10.7	10.2	10.1	10.0	10.3	10.2	9.9	9.8	9.9	10.2	101.3	694.3		
8	Lim Young-sueb (KOR)	594	10.4	10.2	10.1	10.4	9.7	8.6	10.2	9.6	10.3	10.0	99.5	693.5		
