= Shooting at the 2002 Asian Games – Men's 10 metre air rifle team =

Men's 10 metre air rifle team at the 2002 Asian Games
- Venue: Changwon International Shooting Range
- Dates: 2 October 2002
- Competitors: 42 from 14 nations

Medalists
gold medal	China; Cai Yalin, Li Jie, Zhang Fu
silver medal	Japan; Naoki Isobe, Takayuki Okada, Masaru Yanagida
bronze medal	South Korea; Kim Byung-eun, Lee Woo-jeong, Lim Young-sueb

The men's 10 metre air rifle team competition at the 2002 Asian Games in Busan, South Korea was held on 2 October at the Changwon International Shooting Range.

== Schedule ==
All times are Korea Standard Time (UTC+09:00)

Date	Time	Event
Wednesday, 2 October 2002	11:00	Final

== Records ==
Prior to this competition, the existing world, Asian and Games records were as follows.

World Record	Russia	1785	Lahti, Finland	9 July 2002
Asian Record	Thailand	1774	Langkawi, Malaysia	27 January 2000
Games Record	Thailand	1769	Bangkok, Thailand	10 December 1998

== Results ==
Rank	Team	Series						Total	Notes
Rank	Team	1	2	3	4	5	6	Total	Notes
1st place, gold medalist(s)	China (CHN)	296	297	299	300	298	298	1788	WR
	Cai Yalin	98	99	100	100	99	99	595	
	Li Jie	99	99	99	100	100	100	597	
	Zhang Fu	99	99	100	100	99	99	596	
2nd place, silver medalist(s)	Japan (JPN)	296	292	296	297	294	297	1772	
	Naoki Isobe	99	99	100	100	98	98	594	
	Takayuki Okada	99	97	99	99	98	100	592	
	Masaru Yanagida	98	96	97	98	98	99	586	
3rd place, bronze medalist(s)	South Korea (KOR)	294	294	295	298	295	296	1772	
	Kim Byung-eun	96	98	98	100	98	99	589	
	Lee Woo-jeong	99	97	97	99	98	99	589	
	Lim Young-sueb	99	99	100	99	99	98	594	
4	India (IND)	291	292	297	297	292	295	1764	
	Sameer Ambekar	97	96	99	99	100	100	591	
	Abhinav Bindra	100	100	99	100	97	97	593	
	Bharat Singh	94	96	99	98	95	98	580	
5	Uzbekistan (UZB)	295	291	289	298	292	289	1754	
	Sergey Kharitonov	98	97	95	100	96	95	581	
	Ivan Shakhov	97	98	96	99	98	97	585	
	Vyacheslav Skoromnov	100	96	98	99	98	97	588	
6	Thailand (THA)	290	292	289	293	295	294	1753	
	Tevarit Majchacheep	98	99	97	99	98	100	591	
	Nopdao Rueanprang	96	95	96	96	98	98	579	
	Thanapat Thananchai	96	98	96	98	99	96	583	
7	Malaysia (MAS)	294	290	292	292	293	290	1751	
	Sabki Mohd Din	96	97	98	96	94	98	579	
	Mohd Hameleay Mutalib	100	98	99	99	99	97	592	
	Emran Zakaria	98	95	95	97	100	95	580	
8	Kyrgyzstan (KGZ)	292	285	292	296	290	290	1745	
	Aleksandr Babchenko	97	95	97	99	96	96	580	
	Tachir Ismailov	96	92	97	97	95	95	572	
	Yuri Lomov	99	98	98	100	99	99	593	
9	Bangladesh (BAN)	291	287	291	289	289	293	1740	
	Asif Hossain Khan	99	97	98	99	99	98	590	
	Mohammad Uzzaman	97	96	97	95	97	98	580	
	Anwer Zaman	95	94	96	95	93	97	570	
10	Mongolia (MGL)	289	288	292	289	290	288	1736	
	Nergüin Enkhbaatar	93	94	94	98	97	96	572	
	Olzodyn Enkhsaikhan	98	96	99	95	98	98	584	
	Tsedevdorjiin Mönkh-Erdene	98	98	99	96	95	94	580	
11	Iran (IRI)	287	289	293	290	291	285	1735	
	Reza Ahmadi	96	94	97	94	96	92	569	
	Ehsan Homayouni	96	99	99	98	97	98	587	
	Hossein Jahanmiri	95	96	97	98	98	95	579	
12	Kazakhstan (KAZ)	287	290	286	286	289	284	1722	
	Vitaliy Dovgun	95	98	92	96	94	93	568	
	Yuriy Melsitov	97	96	98	96	99	96	582	
	Alexandr Shishigin	95	96	96	94	96	95	572	
13	Oman (OMA)	285	287	285	291	288	284	1720	
	Dadallah Al-Bulushi	95	94	91	96	96	92	564	
	Mohammed Al-Hanai	96	97	97	96	96	95	577	
	Khalaf Al-Khatri	94	96	97	99	96	97	579	
14	Kuwait (KUW)	285	286	288	286	283	283	1711	
	Husain Al-Ajmi	97	95	98	96	94	96	576	
	Khaled Al-Subaie	93	94	96	93	95	95	566	
	Meshal Al-Tahous	95	97	94	97	94	92	569	
