= Sepak takraw at the 2002 Asian Games – Men's regu =

Men's regu at the 2002 Asian Games
- Venue: Minseok Sports Center
- Date: 7–9 October 2002
- Competitors: 40 from 8 nations

Medalists
| gold medal | Thailand |
| silver medal | Myanmar |
| bronze medal | Singapore |
| bronze medal | Malaysia |

The men's regu sepak takraw competition at the 2002 Asian Games in Busan was held from 7 October to 9 October at the Minseok Sports Center in Dongseo University.

== Squads ==
| Brunei | Japan | Malaysia | Myanmar |
|---|---|---|---|
| Rosmadi Kahar; Ahzaman Muhammad; Junaidi Hj Ahmad; Hasrin Hj Ahmad; Kasyfullah Pg Ahmad | Yoshitaka Iida; Kenji Tajiri; Susumu Teramoto; Fumio Arashi; Junya Yano | Fauzi Ghadzali; Suhaimi Mat Salim; Noor Ariffin Pawanteh; Azman Nasruddin; Zulkarnain Arif | Kyaw Min Soe; Than Zaw Oo; Aung Myo San Myint; Aung Hein; Maung Maung |
| Philippines | Singapore | South Korea | Thailand |
| Danilo Alipan; Charlie Magtangob; Nisan Lejan Cal; Harrison Castañares; Hector Memarion | Nur Hisham Adam; Shamsaimon Sabtu; Sharil Abdul Shukor; Eddie Abdul Kadir; Mohd Fami Mohamed | Lee Jun-pyo; Yoo Dong-young; Kim Jong-hun; Gwak Young-duk; Yoon Ju-hyung | Suebsak Phunsueb; Sarawut Inlek; Pornchai Kaokaew; Worapot Thongsai; Poonsak Permsap |

== Results ==
All times are Korea Standard Time (UTC+09:00)

=== Preliminary round ===
==== Group A ====
| Pos | Team | Pld | W | L | SF | SA | SD | Pts | Qualification |
|---|---|---|---|---|---|---|---|---|---|
| 1 | Thailand | 3 | 3 | 0 | 6 | 1 | +5 | 6 | Semifinals |
| 2 | Myanmar | 3 | 2 | 1 | 5 | 2 | +3 | 4 | Semifinals |
| 3 | Japan | 3 | 1 | 2 | 2 | 4 | −2 | 2 | |
| 4 | Brunei | 3 | 0 | 3 | 0 | 6 | −6 | 0 | |

Source: Official website

| Date | Time | | Score | | Set 1 | Set 2 | Set 3 |
|---|---|---|---|---|---|---|---|
| 07 Oct | 10:00 | Thailand | 2–1 | Myanmar | 21–9 | 19–21 | 15–10 |
| 07 Oct | 10:00 | Brunei | 0–2 | Japan | 9–21 | 18–21 | |
| 07 Oct | 13:00 | Thailand | 2–0 | Brunei | 21–7 | 21–10 | |
| 07 Oct | 13:00 | Myanmar | 2–0 | Japan | 21–16 | 21–15 | |
| 08 Oct | 10:00 | Thailand | 2–0 | Japan | 21–10 | 21–16 | |
| 08 Oct | 10:00 | Myanmar | 2–0 | Brunei | 21–13 | 21–14 | |

==== Group B ====
| Pos | Team | Pld | W | L | SF | SA | SD | Pts | Qualification |
|---|---|---|---|---|---|---|---|---|---|
| 1 | Malaysia | 3 | 3 | 0 | 6 | 1 | +5 | 6 | Semifinals |
| 2 | Singapore | 3 | 2 | 1 | 5 | 2 | +3 | 4 | Semifinals |
| 3 | South Korea | 3 | 1 | 2 | 2 | 4 | −2 | 2 | |
| 4 | Philippines | 3 | 0 | 3 | 0 | 6 | −6 | 0 | |

Source: Official website

| Date | Time | | Score | | Set 1 | Set 2 | Set 3 |
|---|---|---|---|---|---|---|---|
| 07 Oct | 11:30 | Malaysia | 2–1 | Singapore | 19–21 | 21–11 | 15–10 |
| 07 Oct | 11:30 | South Korea | 2–0 | Philippines | Walkover | | |
| 07 Oct | 14:30 | Malaysia | 2–0 | South Korea | 21–18 | 21–19 | |
| 07 Oct | 14:30 | Singapore | 2–0 | Philippines | Walkover | | |
| 08 Oct | 11:30 | Malaysia | 2–0 | Philippines | Walkover | | |
| 08 Oct | 11:30 | Singapore | 2–0 | South Korea | 21–16 | 21–12 | |

=== Knockout round ===
Semifinals
9 October
Thailand | 2
Singapore | 0
9 October
Malaysia | 1
Myanmar | 2

Final
9 October
Thailand | 2
Myanmar | 0

==== Semifinals ====
| Date | Time | | Score | | Set 1 | Set 2 | Set 3 |
|---|---|---|---|---|---|---|---|
| 09 Oct | 10:00 | Thailand | 2–0 | Singapore | 21–12 | 21–12 | |
| 09 Oct | 11:30 | Malaysia | 1–2 | Myanmar | 23–21 | 18–21 | 7–15 |

==== Final ====
| Date | Time | | Score | | Set 1 | Set 2 | Set 3 |
|---|---|---|---|---|---|---|---|
| 09 Oct | 15:30 | Thailand | 2–0 | Myanmar | 21–14 | 21–17 | |
