= Sepak takraw at the 2002 Asian Games – Men's team regu =

Men's team regu at the 2002 Asian Games
- Venue: Minseok Sports Center
- Date: 2–6 October 2002
- Competitors: 66 from 6 nations

Medalists
gold medal	Thailand
silver medal	Malaysia
bronze medal	South Korea
bronze medal	Myanmar

The men's team sepak takraw competition at the 2002 Asian Games in Busan was held from 2 October to 6 October at the Minseok Sports Center in Dongseo University.

== Squads ==
Brunei	Malaysia	Myanmar	Singapore
Omar Hj Ahmad; Hasrin Hj Ahmad; Junaidi Hj Ahmad; Hafni Hj Ahmad; Halmi Hj Ahmad; Samali Hj Hitam; Ramlan Ibrahim; Rosmadi Kahar; Ahzaman Muhammad; Sabtu Omar; Kasyfullah Pg Ahmad; Sofian Timbang	Fauzi Ghadzali; Suhaimi Mat Salim; Ahmad Ezzat Zaki; Zulkarnain Arif; Rukman Mustapha; Azman Nasruddin; Noor Ariffin Pawanteh; Zabidi Shariff; Suhaimi Yusof	Aung Hein; Aung Myo San Myint; Kyaw Min Soe; Kyaw Zay Ya; Maung Maung; Myint Swe; Than Zaw Oo; Thaung Nyunt; Thein Zaw Min	Ahmad Fauzi Omar Bakri; Eddie Abdul Kadir; Mohd Fami Mohamed; Zahari Karim; Farid Ismail; Imran Abdul Rahman; Sufian Seedek; Nur Hisham Adam; Padzli Othman; Shamsaimon Sabtu; Sharil Abdul Shukor; Suhaimi Munir
South Korea	Thailand		
Gwak Young-duk; Jeong Sung-hwa; Jung Yeon-hong; Kim Dae-hee; Kim Hyung-il; Kim Jae-min; Kim Jong-hun; Kim Mu-jin; Lee Jun-pyo; Lee Myung-chul; Yoo Dong-young; Yoon Ju-hyung	Sarawut Inlek; Pornchai Kaokaew; Nattawut Panomai; Rawat Parbchompoo; Suriyan Peachan; Poonsak Permsap; Suebsak Phunsueb; Prasert Pongpung; Prawet Saejung; Chart Singrang; Kamphol Thassit; Worapot Thongsai		

== Results ==
All times are Korea Standard Time (UTC+09:00)

=== Preliminary round ===
==== Group A ====
Pos	Team	Pld	W	L	MF	MA	MD	Pts	Qualification
1	Thailand	2	2	0	6	0	+6	4	Semifinals
2	South Korea	2	1	1	3	3	0	2	Semifinals
3	Singapore	2	0	2	0	6	−6	0	

Source: Official website

Date	Time		Score		Regu 1			Regu 2			Regu 3		
Date	Time		Score		Set 1	Set 2	Set 3	Set 1	Set 2	Set 3	Set 1	Set 2	Set 3
02 Oct	10:00	South Korea	0–3	Thailand	0–2			0–2			0–2		
02 Oct	10:00	South Korea	0–3	Thailand	11–21	8–21		6–21	14–21		9–21	9–21	
03 Oct	10:00	Singapore	0–3	Thailand	0–2			0–2			0–2		
03 Oct	10:00	Singapore	0–3	Thailand	7–21	15–21		9–21	10–21		9–21	9–21	
04 Oct	10:00	South Korea	3–0	Singapore	2–1			2–1			2–0		
04 Oct	10:00	South Korea	3–0	Singapore	15–21	21–18	15–13	21–16	24–25	15–8	21–16	21–18	

==== Group B ====
Pos	Team	Pld	W	L	MF	MA	MD	Pts	Qualification
1	Malaysia	2	2	0	6	0	+6	4	Semifinals
2	Myanmar	2	1	1	2	3	−1	2	Semifinals
3	Brunei	2	0	2	0	5	−5	0	

Source: Official website

Date	Time		Score		Regu 1			Regu 2			Regu 3		
Date	Time		Score		Set 1	Set 2	Set 3	Set 1	Set 2	Set 3	Set 1	Set 2	Set 3
02 Oct	13:00	Malaysia	3–0	Myanmar	2–1			2–0			2–0		
02 Oct	13:00	Malaysia	3–0	Myanmar	21–14	17–21	15–13	21–18	21–16		21–12	21–16	
03 Oct	13:00	Brunei	0–3	Malaysia	1–2			0–2			0–2		
03 Oct	13:00	Brunei	0–3	Malaysia	11–21	21–19	10–15	17–21	8–21		15–21	13–21	
04 Oct	13:00	Brunei	0–2	Myanmar	0–2			1–2					
04 Oct	13:00	Brunei	0–2	Myanmar	18–21	12–21		22–20	12–21	6–15			

=== Knockout round ===
Semifinals
5 October
South Korea	0
Malaysia	3
4 October
Myanmar	0
Thailand	2

Final
6 October
Malaysia	0
Thailand	2

==== Semifinals ====
Date	Time		Score		Regu 1			Regu 2			Regu 3		
Date	Time		Score		Set 1	Set 2	Set 3	Set 1	Set 2	Set 3	Set 1	Set 2	Set 3
04 Oct	16:00	Myanmar	0–2	Thailand	0–2			0–2					
04 Oct	16:00	Myanmar	0–2	Thailand	13–21	14–21		17–21	14–21				
05 Oct	10:00	South Korea	0–3	Malaysia	0–2			0–2			0–2		
05 Oct	10:00	South Korea	0–3	Malaysia	19–21	16–21		15–21	10–21		8–21	13–21	

==== Final ====
Date	Time		Score		Regu 1			Regu 2			Regu 3		
Date	Time		Score		Set 1	Set 2	Set 3	Set 1	Set 2	Set 3	Set 1	Set 2	Set 3
06 Oct	10:00	Malaysia	0–2	Thailand	0–2			0–2					
06 Oct	10:00	Malaysia	0–2	Thailand	17–21	8–21		10–21	14–21				
