= Li Jie (rifle shooter) =

Chinese sports shooter

Personal information
- Born: August 25, 1979 (age 47) Xi'an, Shaanxi, China
- Height: 170 cm (5 ft 7 in)
- Weight: 64 kg (141 lb)
Medal record
Men's shooting
Representing China
Olympic Games
Silver medal – second place	2004 Athens	10 m air rifle
Asian Games
Gold medal – first place	2002 Busan	10 m air rifle
Gold medal – first place	2002 Busan	10 m air rifle team
World Championships
Silver medal – second place	2002 Lahti	10 m air rifle
World Cup Final
Gold medal – first place	2002 Munich	10 m air rifle
Silver medal – second place	2004 Bangkok	10 m air rifle

Li Jie (simplified Chinese: 李杰; traditional Chinese: 李傑; pinyin: Lǐ Jié; born August 25, 1979, in Xi'an, Shaanxi) is a male Chinese sports shooter who competed in the 2004 Summer Olympics. He won the silver medal in the men's 10 metre air rifle competition. He lives in Xi'an, Shaanxi.

== Career ==
Li Jie burst on the scene at the 2002 Asian Games, where he won two gold medals. One was in the 10m air rifle; the other was with his teammates in the men's group 10m air rifle. In winning the gold, he and his teammates Zhang Fu and Cai Yalin set a new world record with 1788 points. Li Jie also set a new Asian record in the 10m air rifle with 700.8 points. At the 2002 ISSF World Shooting Championships, he won the silver medal in the 10m air rifle and won qualification to the 2004 Athens Olympics. Li Jie also won the 10m air rifle at the 2002 World Cup. He came up big in Athens, taking home silver, and has his sights set on another medal in Beijing Olympics.

=== Major achievements ===
- 2002: Asian Games: First, men's 10m air rifle
- 2002: World Championships: Second, men's 10m air rifle
- 2004: Athens ISSF World Cup: Third, men's 10m air rifle
- 2004: Athens Olympic Games: Second, men's 10m air rifle
