= Sameer Ambekar =

Indian sport shooter

Personal information
- Nationality: Indian
- Born: 10 January 1981 (age 45)

Sport
- Sport: Shooting
- Event: Rifle shooting
Medal record
Men's shooting
Representing India
Event / 1st / 2nd / 3rd; Commonwealth Games / 1 / 0 / 0
Commonwealth Games
| Gold medal – first place | 2002 Manchester | 10 m air rifle – pairs |

Sameer Ambekar (born 10 January 1981) is an Indian former sport shooter who competed in rifle shooting events. He won the gold medal in the men's 10 m air rifle pairs event at the 2002 Commonwealth Games in Manchester.

== Biography ==
Sameer Ambekar was born on 10 January 1981. At the 2002 Commonwealth Games in Manchester, Sameer Ambekar partnered Abhinav Bindra in the men's 10 m air rifle pairs event. The Indian pair won the gold medal with a score of 1184 points, setting a new Commonwealth Games record. In the individual men's 10 m air rifle competition, Ambekar finished fifth in the final with an aggregate score of 689.2 points.

Ambekar represented India at the 2002 Asian Games in Busan. He finished 10th in the men's 10 m air rifle individual event with a score of 591 points. In the men's 10 m air rifle team event, the Indian team of Ambedkar, Bindra, and Bharat Singh finished fourth with a combined score of 1764 points. Ambekar competed in the men's air rifle competition at several events of the 2003 ISSF World Cup with a best finish of 20th at Fort Benning. He later represented India at the first World University Shooting Championships in Pilsen, Czech Republic, where he finished 19th in the men's air rifle with a score of 583 out of 600.

After his competitive shooting career, Ambekar moved into work as an armourer and gunsmith. He works with the National Rifle Association of India and has helped customize the guns of Indian shooters, including Elavenil Valarivan and Ramita Jindal.
