= Diving at the 2002 Asian Games – Men's synchronized 10 metre platform =

Men's synchronized 10 metre platform at the 2002 Asian Games
- Venue: Sajik Swimming Pool
- Date: 8 October 2002
- Competitors: 12 from 6 nations

Medalists
gold medal	Hu Jia; Xu Hao	China
silver medal	Ri Jong-nam; Jo Chol-ryong	North Korea
bronze medal	Cho Kwan-hoon; Kwon Kyung-min	South Korea

The women's synchronised 10 metre platform diving competition at the 2002 Asian Games in Busan was held on 8 October at the Sajik Swimming Pool.

== Schedule ==
All times are Korea Standard Time (UTC+09:00)

Date	Time	Event
Tuesday, 8 October 2002	19:00	Final

== Results ==
Rank	Team	Dive					Total
Rank	Team	1	2	3	4	5	Total
1st place, gold medalist(s)	China (CHN); Hu Jia; Xu Hao	54.00	52.80	87.72	73.80	88.32	356.64
2nd place, silver medalist(s)	North Korea (PRK); Ri Jong-nam; Jo Chol-ryong	50.40	49.20	80.64	77.22	68.73	326.19
3rd place, bronze medalist(s)	South Korea (KOR); Cho Kwan-hoon; Kwon Kyung-min	48.60	49.80	69.30	80.64	63.36	311.70
4	Japan (JPN); Kotaro Miyamoto; Kiichiro Miyamoto	44.40	46.80	72.96	68.16	68.40	300.72
5	Philippines (PHI); Jaime Asok; Rexel Fabriga	46.20	43.20	66.60	65.28	77.52	298.80
6	Malaysia (MAS); Noraznizal Najib; Low Lap Bun	43.80	44.40	65.70	64.32	66.30	284.52
