= Squash at the 2002 Asian Games – Women's singles =

Women's singles at the 2002 Asian Games
- Venue: Yangsan College Gymnasium
- Dates: 30 September – 4 October 2002
- Competitors: 14 from 8 nations

Medalists
gold medal	Rebecca Chiu	Hong Kong
silver medal	Nicol David	Malaysia
bronze medal	Lee Hai-kyung	South Korea
bronze medal	Sharon Wee	Malaysia

The women's singles Squash event was part of the squash programme at the 2002 Asian Games and took place from September 30 to October 4, at the Yangsan College Gymnasium, in Yangsan, South Korea.

== Schedule ==
All times are Korea Standard Time (UTC+09:00)

Date	Time	Event
Monday, 30 September 2002	13:30	1/8 finals
Wednesday, 2 October 2002	10:30	Quarterfinals
Thursday, 3 October 2002	10:30	Semifinals
Friday, 4 October 2002	13:00	Final

== Results ==
=== Final ===
Final
1	Nicol David (MAS)	7	5	7
2	Rebecca Chiu (HKG)	9	9	9

=== Top half ===
1/8 finals
Joannah Yue (SIN)	5	2	2
5	Christina Mak (HKG)	9	9	9
7	Chinatsu Matsui (JPN)	6	9	7	6
Vaidehi Reddy (IND)	9	7	9	9
4	Lee Hai-kyung (KOR)	9	9	9
Kushani Daluwatta (SRI)	0	0	0

Quarterfinals
1	Nicol David (MAS)	9	9	9
5	Christina Mak (HKG)	5	6	1
Vaidehi Reddy (IND)	6	2	1
4	Lee Hai-kyung (KOR)	9	9	9

Semifinals
1	Nicol David (MAS)	9	10	9
4	Lee Hai-kyung (KOR)	5	8	2

=== Bottom half ===
1/8 finals
3	Sharon Wee (MAS)	9	9	9
Tehani Guruge (SRI)	0	1	1
6	Joshna Chinappa (IND)	3	9	10	9
Park Eun-ok (KOR)	9	7	8	2
8	Mami Nishio (JPN)	9	9	9
Cheng Jiao (CHN)	0	0	0

Quarterfinals
3	Sharon Wee (MAS)	9	9	9
6	Joshna Chinappa (IND)	1	1	6
8	Mami Nishio (JPN)	5	5	4
2	Rebecca Chiu (HKG)	9	9	9

Semifinals
3	Sharon Wee (MAS)	9	1	1	2
2	Rebecca Chiu (HKG)	2	9	9	9
