= Bowling at the 2002 Asian Games – Women's trios =

Women's trios at the 2002 Asian Games
- Venue: Homeplus Asiad Bowling Alley
- Date: 5–6 October 2002
- Competitors: 48 from 9 nations

Medalists
gold medal	South Korea; Cha Mi-jung, Kim Soo-kyung, Kim Yeau-jin
silver medal	Chinese Taipei; Huang Chung-yao, Wang Yi-fen, Wang Yu-ling
bronze medal	Malaysia; Shalin Zulkifli, Sarah Yap, Wendy Chai

The women's trios competition at the 2002 Asian Games in Busan was held on 5 and 6 October 2002 at the Homeplus Asiad Bowling Alley.

== Schedule ==
All times are Korea Standard Time (UTC+09:00)

Date	Time	Event
Saturday, 5 October 2002	13:10	First block
Sunday, 6 October 2002	09:00	Second block

== Results ==
Rank	Team	Game						Total
Rank	Team	1	2	3	4	5	6	Total
1st place, gold medalist(s)	South Korea 1 (KOR)	658	672	655	594	526	700	3805
	Cha Mi-jung	181	224	215	224	190	264	1298
	Kim Soo-kyung	266	244	212	190	178	247	1337
	Kim Yeau-jin	211	204	228	180	158	189	1170
2nd place, silver medalist(s)	Chinese Taipei 1 (TPE)	606	624	588	628	691	659	3796
	Huang Chung-yao	201	188	202	177	278	229	1275
	Wang Yi-fen	226	209	192	215	178	199	1219
	Wang Yu-ling	179	227	194	236	235	231	1302
3rd place, bronze medalist(s)	Malaysia 1 (MAS)	577	648	573	630	632	660	3720
	Shalin Zulkifli	218	226	205	191	191	243	1274
	Sarah Yap	182	232	149	203	226	239	1231
	Wendy Chai	177	190	219	236	215	178	1215
4	Chinese Taipei 2 (TPE)	629	566	638	632	645	594	3704
	Chou Miao-lin	194	215	221	234	201	192	1257
	Huang Tsai-feng	233	164	194	217	229	199	1236
	Chu Yu-chieh	202	187	223	181	215	203	1211
5	South Korea 2 (KOR)	594	537	716	671	603	564	3685
	Kim Hee-soon	204	172	191	247	207	190	1211
	Kim Hyo-mi	215	197	248	212	192	160	1224
	Nam Bo-ra	175	168	277	212	204	214	1250
6	Hong Kong 2 (HKG)	590	601	653	623	574	638	3679
	Janet Lam	183	200	204	221	165	180	1153
	Jenny Ho	211	193	221	165	194	200	1184
	Vanessa Fung	196	208	228	237	215	258	1342
7	Malaysia 2 (MAS)	640	637	594	572	550	651	3644
	Sharon Chai	233	195	173	158	189	201	1149
	Lisa Kwan	193	222	178	188	196	193	1170
	Lai Kin Ngoh	214	220	243	226	165	257	1325
8	Philippines 2 (PHI)	641	647	618	549	605	581	3641
	Liza del Rosario	209	197	220	188	220	169	1203
	Liza Clutario	214	202	215	181	190	214	1216
	Cecilia Yap	218	248	183	180	195	198	1222
9	Japan 2 (JPN)	492	604	631	697	536	635	3595
	Tomomi Shibata	143	196	179	266	180	223	1187
	Hiroko Shimizu	173	194	226	223	192	200	1208
	Nachimi Itakura	176	214	226	208	164	212	1200
10	Thailand 1 (THA)	609	614	579	568	550	633	3553
	Donlaya Larpapharat	216	182	187	213	169	228	1195
	Thunyaporn Chaintrvong	180	208	189	179	200	181	1137
	Wannasiri Duangdee	213	224	203	176	181	224	1221
11	Singapore 2 (SIN)	542	595	557	622	583	567	3466
	Jennifer Tan	193	166	196	181	192	188	1116
	Alice Tay	179	246	183	257	189	200	1254
	Valerie Teo	170	183	178	184	202	179	1096
12	Japan 1 (JPN)	523	557	652	556	580	574	3442
	Ayano Katai	174	149	207	216	182	184	1112
	Miyuki Kubotani	194	203	233	159	190	217	1196
	Mari Kimura	155	205	212	181	208	173	1134
13	Hong Kong 1 (HKG)	590	513	589	581	543	583	3399
	Veronica Wong	204	159	191	182	192	215	1143
	Choi Suk Yee	187	205	199	226	162	190	1169
	Cookie Lee	199	149	199	173	189	178	1087
14	Singapore 1 (SIN)	605	520	593	563	539	552	3372
	Rena Teng	175	201	231	165	206	173	1151
	Yap Seok Kim	195	158	170	185	163	174	1045
	Jesmine Ho	235	161	192	213	170	205	1176
15	Philippines 1 (PHI)	494	503	630	516	606	542	3291
	Irene Garcia	133	217	191	204	194	170	1109
	Kathleen Ann Lopez	180	147	225	141	217	195	1105
	Josephine Canare	181	139	214	171	195	177	1077
16	Mongolia 1 (MGL)	357	372	386	314	433	330	2192
	Gantömöriin Solongo	91	149	114	94	122	101	671
	Choijingiin Amardelger	142	133	161	124	164	118	842
	Idersaikhany Tungalag	124	90	111	96	147	111	679
Individuals
	Filomena Choi (MAC)	180	169	179	187	170	227	1112
