= Diving at the 2002 Asian Games – Men's synchronized 3 metre springboard =

Men's synchronized 3 metre springboard at the 2002 Asian Games
- Venue: Sajik Swimming Pool
- Date: 9 October 2002
- Competitors: 10 from 5 nations

Medalists
gold medal	Peng Bo; Wang Kenan	China
silver medal	Cho Kwan-hoon; Kwon Kyung-min	South Korea
bronze medal	Yeoh Ken Nee; Rossharisham Roslan	Malaysia

The men's synchronised 3 metre springboard diving competition at the 2002 Asian Games in Busan was held on 9 October at the Sajik Swimming Pool.

== Schedule ==
All times are Korea Standard Time (UTC+09:00)

Date	Time	Event
Wednesday, 9 October 2002	10:00	Final

== Results ==
Rank	Team	Dive					Total
Rank	Team	1	2	3	4	5	Total
1st place, gold medalist(s)	China (CHN); Peng Bo; Wang Kenan	51.60	52.20	78.12	77.52	86.70	346.14
2nd place, silver medalist(s)	South Korea (KOR); Cho Kwan-hoon; Kwon Kyung-min	48.60	51.60	74.40	71.10	76.50	322.20
3rd place, bronze medalist(s)	Malaysia (MAS); Yeoh Ken Nee; Rossharisham Roslan	47.40	45.00	70.20	70.68	64.80	298.08
4	Japan (JPN); Kotaro Miyamoto; Kiichiro Miyamoto	29.40	47.40	61.20	52.20	66.99	257.19
5	Chinese Taipei (TPE); Fan Ching-yao; Lin Tzu-hsiang	43.20	43.20	60.30	37.80	62.10	246.60
