= Karate at the 2002 Asian Games – Women's kumite 53 kg =

Karate competition

Women's kumite 53 kg at the 2002 Asian Games
- Venue: Yangsan College Gymnasium
- Date: 11 October 2002
- Competitors: 8 from 8 nations

Medalists
gold medal	Vũ Kim Anh	Vietnam
silver medal	Eri Fujioka	Japan
bronze medal	Murugaiyan Srirajarajeswari	Malaysia
bronze medal	Hsieh Ai-chen	Chinese Taipei

The women's kumite 53 kilograms competition at the 2002 Asian Games in Busan was held on 11 October at the Yangsan College Gymnasium.

== Schedule ==
All times are Korea Standard Time (UTC+09:00)

Date	Time	Event
Friday, 11 October 2002	15:30	1st preliminary round
Friday, 11 October 2002	15:30	Semifinals
Friday, 11 October 2002	15:30	Final repechage
Friday, 11 October 2002	15:30	Final

== Results ==
=== Main bracket ===
1st preliminary round		Semifinals		Final
Murugaiyan Srirajarajeswari (MAS)	4
Irina Tishina (KAZ)	2	Murugaiyan Srirajarajeswari (MAS)	6
Eri Fujioka (JPN)	5	Eri Fujioka (JPN)	10
Nigora Tyuryaeva (TJK)	1			Eri Fujioka (JPN)	4
Vũ Kim Anh (VIE)	3			Vũ Kim Anh (VIE)	5
Hsieh Ai-chen (TPE)	2	Vũ Kim Anh (VIE)	6
Jenny Zeannet (INA)	8	Jenny Zeannet (INA)	2
Asma Khalid (UAE)	1

=== Repechage ===
Final repechage
Nigora Tyuryaeva (TJK)	1
Murugaiyan Srirajarajeswari (MAS)	5
Jenny Zeannet (INA)	1
Hsieh Ai-chen (TPE)	3
