= Karate at the 2002 Asian Games – Men's kata =

Karate competition

Men's kata at the 2002 Asian Games
- Venue: Yangsan College Gymnasium
- Date: 11 October 2002
- Competitors: 9 from 9 nations

Medalists
gold medal	Yukimitsu Hasegawa	Japan
silver medal	Wong Pak Cheong	Macau
bronze medal	Rayappan Jebamalai Edward	Sri Lanka
bronze medal	Ku Jin Keat	Malaysia

The men's individual kata competition at the 2002 Asian Games in Busan was held on 11 October at the Yangsan College Gymnasium.

== Schedule ==
All times are Korea Standard Time (UTC+09:00)

Date	Time	Event
Friday, 11 October 2002	11:00	1st preliminary round
Friday, 11 October 2002	11:00	Quarterfinals
Friday, 11 October 2002	11:00	Semifinals
Friday, 11 October 2002	11:00	Final repechage
Friday, 11 October 2002	14:55	Final

== Results ==
Legend

- WO — Won by walkover

=== Main bracket ===
1st preliminary round
Fuad Al-Sharabi (YEM)
Abdul Malik Mohd Zaini (BRU)	WO

Quarterfinals
Rayappan Jebamalai Edward (SRI)	1
Wong Pak Cheong (MAC)	2
Antonio de Araújo (TMP)	0
Farman Ahmed (PAK)	3
Ku Jin Keat (MAS)	1
Yukimitsu Hasegawa (JPN)	2
Abdul Malik Mohd Zaini (BRU)	1
Wong Pan Pan (HKG)	2

Semifinals
Wong Pak Cheong (MAC)	3
Farman Ahmed (PAK)	0
Yukimitsu Hasegawa (JPN)	3
Wong Pan Pan (HKG)	0

Final
Wong Pak Cheong (MAC)	0
Yukimitsu Hasegawa (JPN)	3

=== Repechage ===
Final repechage
Rayappan Jebamalai Edward (SRI)	3
Farman Ahmed (PAK)	0
Wong Pan Pan (HKG)	0
Ku Jin Keat (MAS)	3
