= Diving at the 2002 Asian Games – Men's 10 metre platform =

Men's 10 metre platform at the 2002 Asian Games
- Venue: Sajik Swimming Pool
- Date: 13 October 2002
- Competitors: 10 from 6 nations

Medalists
gold medal	Tian Liang	China
silver medal	Xu Xiang	China
bronze medal	Jo Chol-ryong	North Korea

The men's 10 metre platform diving competition at the 2002 Asian Games in Busan was held on 13 October at the Sajik Swimming Pool.

== Schedule ==
All times are Korea Standard Time (UTC+09:00)

Date	Time	Event
Sunday, 13 October 2002	10:00	Semifinal
Sunday, 13 October 2002	19:00	Final

== Results ==
=== Semifinal ===
Rank	Athlete	Score
1	Xu Xiang (CHN)	196.38
2	Tian Liang (CHN)	194.04
3	Jo Chol-ryong (PRK)	189.00
4	Kwon Kyung-min (KOR)	184.14
5	Kiichiro Miyamoto (JPN)	183.84
6	Rexel Fabriga (PHI)	180.90
7	Low Lap Bun (MAS)	179.40
8	Hong Myung-ho (KOR)	178.56
9	Noraznizal Najib (MAS)	175.68
10	Kotaro Miyamoto (JPN)	172.71

=== Final ===
Rank	Athlete	SF	Dive						Final	Total
Rank	Athlete	SF	1	2	3	4	5	6	Final	Total
1st place, gold medalist(s)	Tian Liang (CHN)	194.04	83.64	71.10	87.15	90.72	79.68	82.62	494.91	688.95
2nd place, silver medalist(s)	Xu Xiang (CHN)	196.38	74.70	75.60	80.19	84.48	68.34	88.74	472.05	668.43
3rd place, bronze medalist(s)	Jo Chol-ryong (PRK)	189.00	73.80	82.56	79.20	84.66	80.64	74.82	475.68	664.68
4	Rexel Fabriga (PHI)	180.90	72.00	60.90	69.60	78.72	73.44	76.80	431.46	612.36
5	Kwon Kyung-min (KOR)	184.14	66.60	77.76	67.32	61.56	77.76	62.10	413.10	597.24
6	Kiichiro Miyamoto (JPN)	183.84	38.61	69.12	78.54	66.24	67.20	72.00	391.71	575.55
7	Noraznizal Najib (MAS)	175.68	59.13	65.25	59.13	67.50	70.08	72.42	393.51	569.19
8	Hong Myung-ho (KOR)	178.56	66.60	70.08	64.38	58.32	56.94	64.68	381.00	559.56
9	Kotaro Miyamoto (JPN)	172.71	46.11	72.00	68.31	68.16	59.52	67.50	381.60	554.31
10	Low Lap Bun (MAS)	179.40	52.65	70.47	28.35	71.10	52.80	70.38	345.75	525.15
