= Sailing at the 2002 Asian Games – Women's Europe =

Women's Europe at the 2002 Asian Games
- Venue: Busan Yachting Center
- Date: 3–9 October 2002
- Competitors: 4 from 4 nations

Medalists
gold medal	Lu Chunfeng	China
silver medal	Maiko Sato	Japan
bronze medal	Hong Jin-young	South Korea

The women's Europe competition at the 2002 Asian Games in Busan was held from 3 to 9 October 2002.

== Schedule ==
All times are Korea Standard Time (UTC+09:00)

Date	Time	Event
Thursday, 3 October 2002	11:00	Race 1
Thursday, 3 October 2002	14:00	Race 2
Friday, 4 October 2002	11:00	Race 3
Saturday, 5 October 2002	10:00	Race 4
Saturday, 5 October 2002	11:00	Race 5
Saturday, 5 October 2002	14:00	Race 6
Monday, 7 October 2002	11:00	Race 7
Monday, 7 October 2002	14:00	Race 8
Tuesday, 8 October 2002	11:00	Race 9
Tuesday, 8 October 2002	14:00	Race 10
Wednesday, 9 October 2002	11:00	Race 11

== Results ==
Legend

- RAF — Retired after finishing

Rank	Athlete	Race											Total
Rank	Athlete	1	2	3	4	5	6	7	8	9	10	11	Total
1st place, gold medalist(s)	Lu Chunfeng (CHN)	1	1	1	1	1	1	1	1	~~(2)~~	~~(5)~~; RAF	X	8
2nd place, silver medalist(s)	Maiko Sato (JPN)	2	2	2	2	2	2	2	2	~~(4)~~	~~(3)~~	X	16
3rd place, bronze medalist(s)	Hong Jin-young (KOR)	3	3	~~(4)~~	~~(4)~~	3	3	3	3	3	2	X	23
4	Tiffany Koo (MAS)	~~(4)~~	~~(4)~~	3	3	4	4	4	4	1	1	X	24
