= Karate at the 2002 Asian Games – Men's kumite 55 kg =

Karate competition

Men's kumite 55 kg at the 2002 Asian Games
- Venue: Yangsan College Gymnasium
- Date: 12 October 2002
- Competitors: 14 from 14 nations

Medalists
gold medal	Puvaneswaran Ramasamy	Malaysia
silver medal	Otabek Kasimov	Uzbekistan
bronze medal	Bambang Maulidin	Indonesia
bronze medal	Phạm Trần Nguyên	Vietnam

The men's kumite 55 kilograms competition at the 2002 Asian Games in Busan was held on 12 October at the Yangsan College Gymnasium.

== Schedule ==
All times are Korea Standard Time (UTC+09:00)

Date	Time	Event
Saturday, 12 October 2002	09:00	1st preliminary round
Saturday, 12 October 2002	09:00	Quarterfinals
Saturday, 12 October 2002	09:00	Semifinals
Saturday, 12 October 2002	09:00	1st repechage
Saturday, 12 October 2002	09:00	Final repechage
Saturday, 12 October 2002	16:30	Final

== Results ==
=== Main bracket ===
1st preliminary round
Mahinda Udawaththa (SRI)	1
Otabek Kasimov (UZB)	9
Bambang Maulidin (INA)	9
Wan Chi Iat (MAC)	1
Abdullah Dalloul (QAT)	1
Bader Al-Otaibi (KUW)	4
Damang Syngkon (IND)	3
Jeong Seong-hun (KOR)	9
Khalid Sulaiman (UAE)	5
Hj Eddie Jofriani Hj Johari (BRU)	7
Dilovar Sharipov (TJK)	1
Puvaneswaran Ramasamy (MAS)	5

Quarterfinals
Amrit Adhikari (NEP)	3
Otabek Kasimov (UZB)	12
Bambang Maulidin (INA)	2
Bader Al-Otaibi (KUW)	0
Jeong Seong-hun (KOR)	8
Hj Eddie Jofriani Hj Johari (BRU)	5
Puvaneswaran Ramasamy (MAS)	5
Phạm Trần Nguyên (VIE)	3

Semifinals
Otabek Kasimov (UZB)	9
Bambang Maulidin (INA)	4
Jeong Seong-hun (KOR)	4
Puvaneswaran Ramasamy (MAS)	12

Final
Otabek Kasimov (UZB)	2
Puvaneswaran Ramasamy (MAS)	4

=== Repechage ===
1st repechage
Mahinda Udawaththa (SRI)	2
Amrit Adhikari (NEP)	9
Phạm Trần Nguyên (VIE)	3
Dilovar Sharipov (TJK)	1

Final repechage
Amrit Adhikari (NEP)	0
Bambang Maulidin (INA)	3
Jeong Seong-hun (KOR)	1
Phạm Trần Nguyên (VIE)	3
