= Maiko Sato =

Japanese sailor (born 1978)

Personal information
- Nationality: Japan
- Born: 29 May 1978 (age 48) Yamaguchi Prefecture, Japan
- Height: 1.55 m (5 ft 1 in)
- Weight: 65 kg (143 lb)

Sailing career
- Sport: Sailing
- Class: Dinghy
Medal record
Women's sailing
Representing Japan
Asian Games
Silver medal – second place	2002 Busan	Europe

Maiko Sato (佐藤 麻衣子, Sato Maiko; born 29 May 1978) is a Japanese former sailor, who specialized in both Europe and Laser Radial classes. She captured a silver medal in her respective single-handed boat category at the 2002 Asian Games in Busan, South Korea, and was also selected to compete for Japan in two editions of the Olympic Games (2000 and 2004).

Sato made her Olympic debut in Sydney 2000, where she finished twenty-third in the Europe class with a satisfying net grade of 172, surpassing Belarusian sailor Tatiana Drozdovskaya by a close, four-point margin.

When South Korea hosted the 2002 Asian Games, Sato sailed away vigorously towards a silver-medal finish in the Europe class with a grade of 16 points, an exact double of the score attained by her Chinese rival and eventual champion Lu Chunfeng.

At the 2004 Summer Olympics in Athens, Sato qualified for her second Japanese team in the Europe class by virtue of her status as the country's top sailor in her respective category, placing among the top 30 from the Semaine Olympique Francaise nearly three months earlier in Hyères, France. As her previous Games, Sato could not be able to improve her Olympic feat with mediocre marks recorded throughout the eleven-race series, sitting her in twenty-fourth position with 192 net points. Furthermore, Sato's overall score spared her from the far bottom of the leaderboard by a twelve-point edge over the Russian rookie Natalia Ivanova.
