= Bowling at the 2002 Asian Games – Women's masters =

Women's masters at the 2002 Asian Games
- Venue: Homeplus Asiad Bowling Alley
- Date: 8–9 October 2002
- Competitors: 16 from 8 nations

Medalists
gold medal	Shalin Zulkifli	Malaysia
silver medal	Lai Kin Ngoh	Malaysia
bronze medal	Kim Hyo-mi	South Korea

The women's masters competition at the 2002 Asian Games in Busan was held on 8 and 9 October 2002 at the Homeplus Asiad Bowling Alley.

The Masters event comprises the top 16 bowlers (maximum two per country) from the all-events category.

== Schedule ==
All times are Korea Standard Time (UTC+09:00)

Date	Time	Event
Tuesday, 8 October 2002	13:00	First block
Wednesday, 9 October 2002	10:00	Second block
Wednesday, 9 October 2002	13:00	2nd/3rd place
Wednesday, 9 October 2002	14:00	1st/2nd place

== Results ==
=== Preliminary ===
Rank	Athlete	Game																Total
Rank	Athlete	1	2	3	4	5	6	7	8	9	10	11	12	13	14	15	16	Total
1	Shalin Zulkifli (MAS)	235; 10	201; 10	201; 5	223; 10	198; 0	213; 0	206; 0	222; 5	244; 10	258; 10	268; 10	213; 10	197; 0	187; 0	220; 10	226; 10	3612
2	Kim Hyo-mi (KOR)	190; 10	169; 0	212; 0	221; 10	247; 10	234; 10	237; 10	232; 10	238; 10	170; 0	211; 10	207; 10	221; 0	223; 10	248; 10	225; 0	3595
3	Lai Kin Ngoh (MAS)	231; 0	183; 10	226; 10	196; 10	244; 10	192; 0	233; 10	189; 0	192; 0	244; 10	220; 10	200; 10	187; 0	198; 0	234; 10	248; 10	3517
4	Wannasiri Duangdee (THA)	268; 10	165; 0	233; 10	223; 10	206; 10	189; 0	227; 10	204; 0	197; 10	224; 0	222; 10	222; 10	189; 10	188; 0	213; 0	214; 0	3474
5	Liza Clutario (PHI)	196; 10	204; 0	199; 0	246; 10	192; 0	226; 10	211; 0	259; 10	182; 0	236; 0	197; 10	173; 0	217; 10	202; 0	217; 10	234; 10	3471
6	Nachimi Itakura (JPN)	190; 0	186; 10	207; 0	165; 0	237; 10	177; 0	183; 10	247; 10	181; 0	208; 10	277; 10	212; 10	226; 10	211; 10	213; 10	224; 0	3444
7	Huang Chung-yao (TPE)	210; 0	226; 10	204; 0	244; 10	215; 10	213; 10	229; 10	222; 5	180; 0	203; 0	146; 0	200; 0	220; 10	205; 10	191; 0	207; 10	3400
8	Janet Lam (HKG)	233; 10	156; 0	201; 5	212; 0	213; 0	207; 0	224; 10	201; 0	254; 10	229; 10	200; 10	203; 0	176; 0	186; 10	205; 10	201; 10	3386
9	Liza del Rosario (PHI)	177; 0	179; 0	164; 0	220; 10	213; 0	205; 10	210; 10	179; 0	195; 10	176; 0	226; 0	216; 10	222; 10	224; 10	233; 10	248; 10	3377
10	Wang Yu-ling (TPE)	217; 10	214; 10	179; 0	198; 0	214; 10	188; 10	178; 0	215; 0	229; 10	237; 10	217; 0	202; 0	227; 10	180; 0	224; 0	173; 0	3362
11	Mari Kimura (JPN)	195; 10	184; 10	220; 10	170; 0	203; 0	247; 10	223; 0	244; 10	202; 10	184; 10	182; 0	190; 0	224; 0	232; 0	202; 0	169; 0	3341
12	Kim Soo-kyung (KOR)	178; 0	197; 0	216; 10	245; 10	220; 10	191; 10	185; 0	222; 10	167; 0	185; 10	206; 0	176; 0	190; 0	203; 10	207; 10	219; 0	3287
13	Valerie Teo (SIN)	182; 0	166; 10	225; 10	238; 0	207; 0	186; 0	202; 0	195; 0	178; 0	206; 10	178; 0	189; 10	243; 10	173; 0	183; 0	222; 10	3233
14	Alice Tay (SIN)	211; 10	194; 10	203; 10	203; 0	192; 0	178; 0	203; 10	237; 10	172; 10	177; 0	163; 0	174; 0	214; 10	253; 10	180; 0	162; 0	3196
15	Vanessa Fung (HKG)	189; 0	182; 0	215; 0	188; 0	200; 0	199; 10	181; 0	190; 10	175; 0	181; 0	184; 10	183; 0	141; 0	222; 10	209; 0	207; 10	3096
16	Donlaya Larpapharat (THA)	173; 0	162; 0	213; 10	225; 0	216; 10	201; 0	203; 0	179; 0	207; 0	157; 0	189; 0	197; 10	172; 0	164; 0	168; 0	192; 0	3048

=== Stepladder finals ===
Grand final 2nd/3rd place			Grand final 1st/2nd place
			1	Shalin Zulkifli (MAS)	256	209	465
2	Kim Hyo-mi (KOR)	206	3	Lai Kin Ngoh (MAS)	184	197	381
3	Lai Kin Ngoh (MAS)	210
