= Diving at the 2002 Asian Games – Men's 3 metre springboard =

Men's 3 metre springboard at the 2002 Asian Games
- Venue: Sajik Swimming Pool
- Date: 11 October 2002
- Competitors: 10 from 6 nations

Medalists
gold medal	Wang Tianling	China
silver medal	Wang Feng	China
bronze medal	Yeoh Ken Nee	Malaysia

The men's 3 metre springboard diving competition at the 2002 Asian Games in Busan was held on 11 October at the Sajik Swimming Pool.

== Schedule ==
All times are Korea Standard Time (UTC+09:00)

Date	Time	Event
Friday, 11 October 2002	10:00	Semifinal
Friday, 11 October 2002	19:00	Final

== Results ==
Legend

- DNS — Did not start

=== Semifinal ===
Rank	Athlete	Score
1	Wang Feng (CHN)	243.84
2	Wang Tianling (CHN)	242.40
3	Suchart Pichi (THA)	240.90
4	Cho Kwan-hoon (KOR)	237.00
5	Yeoh Ken Nee (MAS)	235.05
6	Rossharisham Roslan (MAS)	224.46
7	Kwon Kyung-min (KOR)	223.77
8	Kotaro Miyamoto (JPN)	221.82
9	Kiichiro Miyamoto (JPN)	209.58
10	Mubarak Al-Nuaimi (QAT)	195.06

=== Final ===
Rank	Athlete	SF	Dive						Final	Total
Rank	Athlete	SF	1	2	3	4	5	6	Final	Total
1st place, gold medalist(s)	Wang Tianling (CHN)	242.40	77.40	79.98	80.58	86.70	87.15	87.15	498.96	741.36
2nd place, silver medalist(s)	Wang Feng (CHN)	243.84	81.00	80.91	86.70	78.75	89.25	75.48	492.09	735.93
3rd place, bronze medalist(s)	Yeoh Ken Nee (MAS)	235.05	71.10	69.75	70.20	75.60	73.80	73.08	433.53	668.58
4	Suchart Pichi (THA)	240.90	71.10	60.30	71.40	70.20	68.82	84.15	425.97	666.87
5	Rossharisham Roslan (MAS)	224.46	66.60	75.33	52.20	54.00	77.22	68.40	393.75	618.21
6	Cho Kwan-hoon (KOR)	237.00	67.89	67.50	56.55	53.10	49.50	72.90	367.44	604.44
7	Kotaro Miyamoto (JPN)	221.82	62.31	71.10	72.00	67.50	42.63	63.90	379.44	601.26
8	Kiichiro Miyamoto (JPN)	209.58	63.00	67.89	63.90	54.00	63.90	62.64	375.33	584.91
9	Kwon Kyung-min (KOR)	223.77	72.54	65.70	0.00	74.70	65.70	73.80	352.44	576.21
—	Mubarak Al-Nuaimi (QAT)	195.06								DNS
