= Bowling at the 2002 Asian Games – Women's doubles =

Women's doubles at the 2002 Asian Games
- Venue: Homeplus Asiad Bowling Alley
- Date: 4 October 2002
- Competitors: 46 from 9 nations

Medalists
gold medal	Sarah Yap; Wendy Chai	Malaysia
silver medal	Cha Mi-jung; Kim Soo-kyung	South Korea
bronze medal	Wang Yi-fen; Wang Yu-ling	Chinese Taipei

The women's doubles competition at the 2002 Asian Games in Busan was held on 4 October 2002 at the Homeplus Asiad Bowling Alley.

== Schedule ==
All times are Korea Standard Time (UTC+09:00)

Date	Time	Event
Friday, 4 October 2002	09:00	Squad A

== Results ==
Rank	Team	Game						Total
Rank	Team	1	2	3	4	5	6	Total
1st place, gold medalist(s)	Malaysia 1 (MAS)	408	394	439	455	435	458	2589
	Sarah Yap	192	202	226	258	230	212	1320
	Wendy Chai	216	192	213	197	205	246	1269
2nd place, silver medalist(s)	South Korea 1 (KOR)	435	442	403	416	464	398	2558
	Cha Mi-jung	233	258	170	221	206	183	1271
	Kim Soo-kyung	202	184	233	195	258	215	1287
3rd place, bronze medalist(s)	Chinese Taipei 1 (TPE)	399	415	435	401	397	461	2508
	Wang Yi-fen	171	222	214	202	201	216	1226
	Wang Yu-ling	228	193	221	199	196	245	1282
4	Chinese Taipei 3 (TPE)	347	397	473	425	501	353	2496
	Huang Chung-yao	208	215	247	237	243	204	1354
	Chu Yu-chieh	139	182	226	188	258	149	1142
5	Malaysia 3 (MAS)	425	413	416	411	407	375	2447
	Shalin Zulkifli	201	219	195	199	214	202	1230
	Lai Kin Ngoh	224	194	221	212	193	173	1217
6	Singapore 1 (SIN)	335	416	371	447	443	430	2442
	Alice Tay	178	215	189	232	220	228	1262
	Rena Teng	157	201	182	215	223	202	1180
7	Japan 1 (JPN)	383	382	419	393	464	395	2436
	Miyuki Kubotani	189	193	175	212	187	190	1146
	Mari Kimura	194	189	244	181	277	205	1290
8	Chinese Taipei 2 (TPE)	410	423	354	401	428	419	2435
	Chou Miao-lin	204	217	186	220	183	205	1215
	Huang Tsai-feng	206	206	168	181	245	214	1220
9	Japan 3 (JPN)	411	433	371	360	445	412	2432
	Ayano Katai	211	234	180	179	246	176	1226
	Nachimi Itakura	200	199	191	181	199	236	1206
10	Philippines 1 (PHI)	448	406	386	404	427	358	2429
	Liza del Rosario	226	223	193	214	231	163	1250
	Liza Clutario	222	183	193	190	196	195	1179
11	Hong Kong 2 (HKG)	404	338	400	419	430	437	2428
	Janet Lam	189	158	197	258	224	236	1262
	Jenny Ho	215	180	203	161	206	201	1166
12	Singapore 2 (SIN)	377	418	409	416	389	405	2414
	Jennifer Tan	225	219	195	202	194	214	1249
	Jesmine Ho	152	199	214	214	195	191	1165
13	South Korea 2 (KOR)	385	384	423	397	438	377	2404
	Kim Yeau-jin	194	189	226	193	204	213	1219
	Nam Bo-ra	191	195	197	204	234	164	1185
14	South Korea 3 (KOR)	376	374	399	370	436	444	2399
	Kim Hee-soon	179	181	204	188	214	202	1168
	Kim Hyo-mi	197	193	195	182	222	242	1231
15	Philippines 2 (PHI)	326	433	368	494	376	381	2378
	Irene Garcia	167	219	181	225	151	193	1136
	Cecilia Yap	159	214	187	269	225	188	1242
16	Malaysia 2 (MAS)	350	396	370	429	397	413	2355
	Sharon Chai	182	201	205	224	226	233	1271
	Lisa Kwan	168	195	165	205	171	180	1084
17	Japan 2 (JPN)	353	383	364	435	445	365	2345
	Tomomi Shibata	174	198	183	201	197	183	1136
	Hiroko Shimizu	179	185	181	234	248	182	1209
18	Singapore 3 (SIN)	442	343	364	369	385	420	2323
	Valerie Teo	248	191	205	188	202	220	1254
	Yap Seok Kim	194	152	159	181	183	200	1069
19	Hong Kong 3 (HKG)	356	361	360	378	420	441	2316
	Cookie Lee	194	175	178	179	186	222	1134
	Vanessa Fung	162	186	182	199	234	219	1182
20	Hong Kong 1 (HKG)	409	376	379	326	379	363	2232
	Veronica Wong	205	189	180	170	177	204	1125
	Choi Suk Yee	204	187	199	156	202	159	1107
21	Philippines 3 (PHI)	334	356	327	395	381	363	2156
	Kathleen Ann Lopez	157	184	146	188	183	180	1038
	Josephine Canare	177	172	181	207	198	183	1118
22	Thailand 1 (THA)	376	307	348	366	361	359	2117
	Donlaya Larpapharat	177	157	158	193	172	179	1036
	Wannasiri Duangdee	199	150	190	173	189	180	1081
23	Mongolia 1 (MGL)	217	251	250	291	224	282	1515
	Choijingiin Amardelger	111	156	140	151	123	165	846
	Idersaikhany Tungalag	106	95	110	140	101	117	669
Individuals
	Filomena Choi (MAC)	154	164	158	169	170	190	1005
	Gantömöriin Solongo (MGL)	116	92	116	87	94	159	664
	Thunyaporn Chaintrvong (THA)	203	181	217	195	204	156	1156
