= Sepak takraw at the 2002 Asian Games – Men's circle =

Men's circle at the 2002 Asian Games
- Venue: Minseok Sports Center
- Date: 30 September – 1 October 2002
- Competitors: 41 from 7 nations

Medalists
gold medal	South Korea
silver medal	Thailand
bronze medal	Myanmar
bronze medal	Japan

The men's circle sepak takraw competition at the 2002 Asian Games in Busan was held from 30 September to 1 October at the Minseok Sports Center in Dongseo University.

== Schedule ==
All times are Korea Standard Time (UTC+09:00)

Date	Time	Event
Monday, 30 September 2002	10:00	Preliminary round
Monday, 30 September 2002	14:00	Semifinals
Tuesday, 1 October 2002	11:00	Final

== Squads ==
Japan	Malaysia	Myanmar	Philippines
Yoshitaka Iida; Kenji Tajiri; Susumu Teramoto; Fumio Arashi; Junya Yano	Zulkarnain Arif; Suhaimi Yusof; Ghazali Abdul Ghani; Mahadi Said; Azman Nasruddin; Suhaimi Mat Salim	Thein Zaw Min; Than Zaw Oo; Kyaw Zay Ya; Kyaw Min Soe; Aung Myo San Myint; Myint Swe	Danilo Alipan; Charlie Magtangob; Nisan Lejan Cal; Harrison Castañares; Hector Memarion; Gedemthor Singco
Singapore	South Korea	Thailand	
Nur Hisham Adam; Ahmad Fauzi Omar Bakri; Zahari Karim; Suhaimi Munir; Eddie Abdul Kadir; Mohd Fami Mohamed	Lee Jun-pyo; Yoo Dong-young; Kim Jong-hun; Lee Myung-chul; Gwak Young-duk; Yoon Ju-hyung	Yothin Jorsao; Sawat Sangpakdee; Ekachai Masuk; Saharat Uonumpai; Surasak Jitchuen; Thanakorn Ritsaranchai	

== Results ==
=== Preliminary round ===
Rank	Team	Score	Seed
1	Thailand	1883	Group 1
2	Myanmar	1871	Group 2
3	South Korea	1868	Group 1
4	Japan	1381	Group 2
5	Philippines	1154	Group 1
6	Malaysia	981	Group 2
7	Singapore	655	Group 1

=== Semifinals ===
==== Group 1 ====
Rank	Team	Set			Total
Rank	Team	1	2	3	Total
1	Thailand	1675	1664	1682	5021
2	South Korea	1634	1649	1658	4941
3	Philippines	1384	1541	1464	4389
4	Singapore	637	821	782	2240

==== Group 2 ====
Rank	Team	Set			Total
Rank	Team	1	2	3	Total
1	Myanmar	1624	1651	1665	4940
2	Japan	1222	1288	1290	3800
3	Malaysia	1160	1210	1149	3519

=== Final ===
Rank	Team	Set			Total
Rank	Team	1	2	3	Total
1st place, gold medalist(s)	South Korea	1892	1940	1949	5781
2nd place, silver medalist(s)	Thailand	1890	1945	1888	5723
3rd place, bronze medalist(s)	Myanmar	1656	1757	1767	5180
3rd place, bronze medalist(s)	Japan	1189	1332	1306	3827
