= Lee Pei Fen =

Singaporean host and singer (born 1987)

- Born: December 1987 (age 38–39); Singapore
- Other name: Li Peifen
- Occupations: Host; singer; actress
- Years active: 1993–present

Chinese name
- Chinese: 李佩芬
- Hanyu Pinyin: Lǐ Pèifēn

Lee Pei Fen (born December 1987) is a Singaporean host, singer and actress who has been active in the getai industry since 1993.

== Life and career ==
Lee's housewife mother is her manager and hairstylist, while Lee's father, who works as a painter, drives her to her getai shows.

One of the few effectively bilingual getai hosts who speaks English and Mandarin as well as dialects, Lee's first getai performance was at the age of six. After graduating with a diploma in business administration, Lee started performing full-time in the industry. Outside of her getai gigs, Lee hosts about 20 shows a month for clan associations, temples, community centres and corporate entities.

In 2022, Lee acted in her first web series Gong Dou Gong Lüe, directed by Jack Neo.

In 2023, Lee appeared in the dialect series Whatever Will Be, Will Be; it was her first acting role on television in her thirty years of entertainment career.

== Filmography ==
Lee has appeared in the following programmes and films:

=== Television series ===
- Whatever Will Be, Will Be (2023)

=== Film ===
- 3688 (2015)

=== Web series ===
- My Job My Story (2021; episode 3 "Getai Singers")
- Gong Dou Gong Lüe (2022)
- Happy Sing-Along (2023)

== Awards and nominations ==
Year	Award	Category	Nominated work	Result	Ref
2009	3rd Stomp Getai Awards	Best Female Singer	—N/a	Won	
2013	Shin Min-Wanbao Getai Awards 2013	Most Popular Female Host	—N/a	Won	
2013	Shin Min-Wanbao Getai Awards 2013	Online Popularity Award	—N/a	Won	
2015	Shin Min-Wanbao Getai Awards 2016	Best Female Emcee	—N/a	Won	
2017	Shin Min-Wanbao Getai Awards 2017	Top 10 Most Popular Singers	—N/a	Won	
2017	Shin Min-Wanbao Getai Awards 2017	Most Popular Singer (online votes)	—N/a	Won	
2017	Shin Min-Wanbao Getai Awards 2017	Best Female Emcee	—N/a	Won	
