= Diving at the 2002 Asian Games – Women's synchronized 3 metre springboard =

Women's synchronized 3 metre springboard at the 2002 Asian Games
- Venue: Sajik Swimming Pool
- Date: 8 October 2002
- Competitors: 10 from 5 nations

Medalists
gold medal	Guo Jingjing; Wu Minxia	China
silver medal	Kang Min-kyung; Im Sung-young	South Korea
bronze medal	Farah Begum Abdullah; Leong Mun Yee	Malaysia

The women's synchronised 3 metre springboard diving competition at the 2002 Asian Games in Busan was held on 9 October at the Sajik Swimming Pool.

== Schedule ==
All times are Korea Standard Time (UTC+09:00)

Date	Time	Event
Tuesday, 8 October 2002	10:00	Final

== Results ==
Rank	Team	Dive					Total
Rank	Team	1	2	3	4	5	Total
1st place, gold medalist(s)	China (CHN); Guo Jingjing; Wu Minxia	48.00	50.40	71.10	75.60	74.70	319.80
2nd place, silver medalist(s)	South Korea (KOR); Kang Min-kyung; Im Sung-young	46.20	46.80	51.12	51.84	52.08	248.04
3rd place, bronze medalist(s)	Malaysia (MAS); Farah Begum Abdullah; Leong Mun Yee	43.20	42.60	48.96	53.46	57.12	245.34
4	Japan (JPN); Ryoko Nishii; Mayumi Higuchi	42.60	42.60	47.52	51.24	55.08	239.04
5	Vietnam (VIE); Mai Thị Hải Yến; Hoàng Thanh Trà	41.40	39.00	46.80	49.41	52.08	228.69
