= Shenny Ratna Amelia =

Indonesian diver (born 1983)

Personal information
- Nationality: Indonesian
- Born: 28 October 1983 (age 42) Jakarta, Indonesia

Sport
- Sport: Diving
Medal record
Southeast Asian Games
Gold medal – first place	2007 Thailand	10 m platform
Silver medal – second place	2005 Philippines	10 m platform
Silver medal – second place	2007 Thailand	Synchro platform

Shenny Ratna Amelia (born 28 October 1983) is an Indonesian diver. She competed in the women's 10 metre platform event at the 2000 Summer Olympics.
