= Lim Young-sueb =

South Korean sport shooter

Lim Young-sueb (born December 5, 1973, in Seoul) is a South Korean sport shooter. He competed in rifle shooting events at the Summer Olympics in 1996 and 2000.

== Olympic results ==
Event	1996	2000
10 metre air rifle (men)	T-11th	T-11th
