= Samai Amari =

Indonesian cyclist (born 1980)

Personal information
- Full name: Samai Amari
- Born: 26 September 1980 (age 46) Raha, Indonesia

Cycling career
- Sport: Cycling
- Discipline: Road
- Role: Rider
- Rider type: Sprinter

Professional teams
- 2004–2006: Wismilak Cycling Team
- 2009: LeTua Cycling Team

Major wins
- 1st World Championship, 1 KM Track, Elite B (2007)

Samai Amari (born 26 September 1980) is an Indonesian former professional racing cyclist.

== Major results ==
2003
1st Stages 2, 6 & 7 Jelajah Malaysia
2004
1st Stage 7 Tour of Sunraysia
2005
1st Criterium, Southeast Asian Games
1st Stages 3 & 5 Tour of East Java
2007
1st Kilometer, UCI World B Track Cycling Championships
2009
1st Stage 4 Tour de Langkawi
