= Choi Hye-jin (diver) =

South Korean diver

Personal information
- Nationality: South Korean
- Born: 21 September 1982 (age 44)

Sport
- Sport: Diving

Choi Hye-jin (born 21 September 1982) is a South Korean diver. She competed in the women's 10 metre platform event at the 2000 Summer Olympics.
