= Takiri Miyazaki =

Japanese diver (born 1978)

Personal information
- Nationality: Japanese
- Born: 23 August 1978 (age 47)

Sport
- Sport: Diving
Medal record
Representing Japan
World Championships
Bronze medal – third place	2001 Fukuoka	10m platform synchro
Summer Universiade
Bronze medal – third place	2001 Beijing	10m platform synchro
Asian Games
Bronze medal – third place	2002 Busan	10m platform synchro

Takiri Miyazaki (宮嵜多紀理, Miyazaki; born 23 August 1978) is a Japanese diver. She competed in the women's 10 metre platform event at the 2004 Summer Olympics.
