= Jon Hyon-ju =

North Korean diver (born 1983)

Personal information
- Nationality: North Korean
- Born: 16 February 1983 (age 43)

Sport
- Sport: Diving
Medal record
Representing North Korea
Summer Universiade
Silver medal – second place	2003 Daegu	10m platforn synchro
Bronze medal – third place	2003 Daegu	Team
Asian Games
Silver medal – second place	2002 Busan	10m platform synchro

Jon Hyon-ju (born 16 February 1983) is a North Korean diver. She competed in the women's 10 metre platform event at the 2004 Summer Olympics.
