= Shinichi Ota =

Japanese cyclist (born 1975)

Personal information
- Born: 11 October 1975 (age 51) Saitama, Japan

Cycling career
- Sport: Cycling

Shinichi Ota (太田 真一, Ōta Shin'ichi; born 11 October 1975) is a Japanese cyclist. He competed in two events at the 2000 Summer Olympics.
