= Kim Kyong-ju =

North Korean diver (born 1983)

Personal information
- Native name: 김경주
- Nationality: North Korean
- Born: 19 January 1983 (age 43)

Sport
- Sport: Diving
Medal record
Representing North Korea
Summer Universiade
| Silver medal – second place | 2003 Daegu | 10m platform synchro |
| Bronze medal – third place | 2003 Daegu | Team |
Asian Games
| Silver medal – second place | 2002 Busan | 10m platform synchro |
| Bronze medal – third place | 2002 Busan | 10m platform |

Kim Kyong-ju (born 19 January 1983) is a North Korean diver. She competed in the women's 10 metre platform event at the 2004 Summer Olympics.
