= Ritwik Bhattacharya =

Indian squash player (born 1979)

Personal information
- Born: 14 October 1979 (age 46)

Sport
- Country: India
- Highest ranking: 38 (November 2008)
Medal record
Men's squash
Representing India
World Doubles Championships
Silver medal – second place	2004 Chennai	Doubles

Ritwik Bhattacharya (Bengali: ঋত্বিক ভট্টাচার্য; born 14 October 1979 in Pathankot) is a squash player from India.

The flag bearer of Indian Squash on Professional Squash Association tour, as an accomplished junior players he brought momentum in the Indian squash scene.

Ritwik trained in England for five years under coach Neil Harvey, and was once India's highest ranked squash player (until superseded by Saurav Ghosal in 2013) and its most successful with nine PSA tour titles till date. His highest world ranking was #38 in November 2008. He was the first Indian to break into the top 50 of the PSA World Rankings (May 2006).

- He has won the Indian National Squash Championship five times (1998, 2000, 2001, 2003, 2005).
- He was the finalist at the World Doubles 2004 (Team India, partner: Saurav Ghosal).
- Has earned more than 70 caps playing for India and captained the Indian Team to a top 8 finish in the World Team Championships in 2007.

Ritwik who is now out of competitive squash has set up a squash academy START ( Squash Temple and Real Training) which currently trains over 150 tribal children who have never been exposed to sports and hail from economically and educationally poor background from villages in and around Mokashi on the outskirts of Mumbai in India. Trainees at Bhattacharya's academy are now a regular fixture on the Junior National Circuit.

== Personal life ==
Ritwik Bhattacharya was in relationship with Bollywood actress Neha Dhupia but they split in June 2010. In 2013, Bhattacharya married model Pia Trivedi.

== Television appearances ==
Year	Show	Role	Channel	Notes	Ref
2013	Khatron Ke Khiladi 3	Himself	Colors TV	1st Runner-up	
