= Mansoor Zaman =

Pakistani squash player (born 1980)

Personal information
- Born: April 14, 1980 (age 46) Peshawar, Pakistan
- Height: 1.62 m (5 ft 4 in)
- Weight: 60 kg (132 lb)

Sport
- Country: Pakistan
- Handedness: Left
- Turned pro: 1998
- Coached by: Qamar Zaman
- Racquet used: E-squash

Men's singles
- Highest ranking: 11 (May, 2003)
- Current ranking: 266 (June, 2013)
- Title: 5
- Tour final: 17
- Updated on May 15, 2009

Mansoor Zaman (born April 14, 1980 in Peshawar) is a Pakistani professional squash player.

In 2007, Mansoor won the Governor NWFP International and then the President PSF International 2007, where he defeated his compatriot Aamir Atlas Khan.

== 2002 ==
Mansoor Zaman won the silver medal in the men's singles event at the 2002 Asian Games in Busan, South Korea.

== 2006 ==
Zaman won a bronze medal at the 2006 Asian Games in Doha, Qatar.
