= Shahid Zaman =

Pakistani squash player (born 1982)

Shahid Zaman Khan
Personal information
- Nickname: Shahid Zaman
- Born: Shahid Zaman Khan; August 12, 1982 (age 43) Quetta, Pakistan
- Height: 1.72 m (5 ft 8 in)
- Weight: 118 kg (260 lb)

Sport
- Country: Pakistan
- Handedness: Right
- Turned pro: 1998
- Coached by: Qamar Zaman
- Retired: 2009
- Racquet used: Dunlop

Men's singles
- Highest ranking: 14 (July, 2005)
- Updated on May 28, 2009

Shahid Zaman Khan (born August 12, 1982) is a Pakistani former professional squash player. He is a nephew of the 1975 World squash champion, Qamar Zaman, the famous master of the drop shots and deception.

In 2004, he won his first title at the Pakistan circuit in Event I. In 2005, he won the Virginia Professional Squash championship and went on to win the COAS international 2005 and the Pakistan circuit 2005 - Event II.

In mid-2005, he rose to his career-high PSA ranking of World No.14.

He is now working as a head squash professional in the Tennis and Racquet Club, the oldest athletic and social club in the city of Boston. In 2023, Zaman was appointed as squash instructor at the Harvard Business School.
