= Kwon Kyung-min =

South Korean diver (born 1982)

Personal information
- Nationality: South Korean
- Born: 3 January 1982 (age 44) Seoul, South Korea

Sport
- Sport: Diving
Medal record
Men's diving
Representing South Korea
Summer Universiade
Bronze medal – third place	2003 Daegu	Team
Bronze medal – third place	2003 Daegu	Synchronised Platform
Asian Games
Silver medal – second place	2002 Busan	3m synchro
Bronze medal – third place	2006 Doha	3m synchro

Kwon Kyung-min (born 3 January 1982) is a South Korean diver. He competed at the 1996 Summer Olympics and the 2000 Summer Olympics.
