= Cue sports at the Asian Games =

- Governing bodies: WCBS (World) / ACBS (Asia)
- Events: 10 (men: 6; women: 4)

Games
- 1951; 1954; 1958; 1962; 1966; 1970; 1974; 1978; 1982; 1986; 1990; 1994; 1998; 2002; 2006; 2010; 2014; 2018; 2022; 2026
- Medalists

Cue sports events were contested at the Asian Games starting from the 1998 Games in Bangkok.

== Editions ==
Games	Year	Host city	Best nation
XIII	1998	Bangkok, Thailand	Chinese Taipei
XIV	2002	Busan, South Korea	Chinese Taipei & Thailand
XV	2006	Doha, Qatar	China
XVI	2010	Guangzhou, China	China

== Events ==
Event	98	02	06	10	Years
Carom billiards
Men's three-cushion singles	X	X	X	X	4
Men's straight rail singles		X			1
English billiards
Men's English billiards singles	X	X	X	X	4
Men's English billiards doubles	X	X	X		3
Pool
Men's eight-ball singles	X	X	X	X	4
Men's eight-ball doubles	X				1
Men's nine-ball singles	X	X	X	X	4
Men's nine-ball doubles	X	X			2
Women's eight-ball singles			X	X	2
Women's nine-ball singles			X	X	2
Snooker
Men's snooker singles	X	X	X	X	4
Men's snooker doubles	X	X	X		3
Men's snooker team	X	X	X	X	4
Women's six-red snooker singles				X	1
Women's six-red snooker team				X	1
Total	10	10	10	10	

== Medal table ==
Rank	Nation	Gold	Silver	Bronze	Total
1	Chinese Taipei (TPE)	8	5	8	21
2	China (CHN)	8	4	4	16
3	India (IND)	5	4	6	15
4	Philippines (PHI)	4	4	1	9
5	Japan (JPN)	4	3	4	11
6	Hong Kong (HKG)	4	3	3	10
7	Thailand (THA)	3	4	7	14
8	South Korea (KOR)	1	4	4	9
9	Malaysia (MAS)	1	3	0	4
10	Vietnam (VIE)	1	2	2	5
11	Pakistan (PAK)	1	0	5	6
12	Myanmar (MYA)	0	3	2	5
13	Singapore (SGP)	0	1	2	3
14	Indonesia (INA)	0	0	1	1
14	Kuwait (KUW)	0	0	1	1
Totals (15 entries)		40	40	50	130

== Participating nations ==
Nation	98	02	06	10	Years
Afghanistan			2	4	2
Bahrain			13		1
Bangladesh	3		5	3	3
Brunei	3	6		1	3
Cambodia		2	2		2
China	6	5	7	13	4
Chinese Taipei	12	10	11	11	4
Hong Kong	3	4	5	8	3
India	14	12	17	17	4
Indonesia		3	2	2	3
Iran				3	1
Iraq			3	3	2
Japan	9	9	6	6	4
Jordan			5		1
Kazakhstan	1				1
Kuwait	6	4	11	10	4
Kyrgyzstan				2	1
Lebanon				2	1
Macau	2	5	3		3
Malaysia	10	7	7	7	4
Maldives				6	1
Mongolia	4		10	10	3
Myanmar		2	3	2	3
Pakistan	4	7	12	5	4
Philippines	8	9	9	14	4
Qatar		8	10	6	3
Saudi Arabia			4	11	2
Singapore	7	5	9	6	4
South Korea	2	12	10	11	4
Sri Lanka	3	2	5		3
Syria			2	3	2
Thailand	16	11	11	14	4
United Arab Emirates	3	3	3	3	4
Uzbekistan	5				1
Vietnam	2	6	9	8	4
Number of nations	21	21	28	28	
Number of athletes	123	132	196	191	

== See also ==
- Billiards and snooker at the SEA Games
- Cue sports at the World Games
