= List of Asian Games medalists in cue sports =

This is the complete list of Asian Games medalists in cue sports from 1998 to 2010.

== Men ==
=== Three-cushion singles ===
Games	Gold	Silver	Bronze
1998 Bangkok	Akio Shimada (JPN)	Ryuji Umeda (JPN)	Kim Jung-gyu (KOR)
2002 Busan	Hwang Deuk-hee (KOR)	Lee Sang-chun (KOR)	Akio Shimada (JPN)
2006 Doha	Ryuji Umeda (JPN)	Dương Anh Vũ (VIE)	Kim Kyung-roul (KOR)
2010 Guangzhou	Tsuyoshi Suzuki (JPN)	Joji Kai (JPN)	Dương Anh Vũ (VIE)
2010 Guangzhou	Tsuyoshi Suzuki (JPN)	Joji Kai (JPN)	Lý Thế Vinh (VIE)

=== Straight rail singles ===
Games	Gold	Silver	Bronze
2002 Busan	Trần Đình Hòa (VIE)	Dương Hoàng Anh (VIE)	Nobuaki Kobayashi (JPN)

=== English billiards singles ===
Games	Gold	Silver	Bronze
1998 Bangkok	Ashok Shandilya (IND)	Geet Sethi (IND)	Praprut Chaithanasakun (THA)
2002 Busan	Praprut Chaithanasakun (THA)	Kyaw Oo (MYA)	Geet Sethi (IND)
2006 Doha	Pankaj Advani (IND)	Ashok Shandilya (IND)	Peter Gilchrist (SIN)
2010 Guangzhou	Pankaj Advani (IND)	Nay Thway Oo (MYA)	Kyaw Oo (MYA)
2010 Guangzhou	Pankaj Advani (IND)	Nay Thway Oo (MYA)	Peter Gilchrist (SIN)

=== English billiards doubles ===
Games	Gold	Silver	Bronze
1998 Bangkok	Geet Sethi and Ashok Shandilya (IND)	Praprut Chaithanasakun and Mongkhon Kanfaklang (THA)	Devendra Joshi and Balachandra Bhaskar (IND)
2002 Busan	Praprut Chaithanasakun and Mongkhon Kanfaklang (THA)	Geet Sethi and Alok Kumar (IND)	Kyaw Oo and Aung San Oo (MYA)
2006 Doha	Praprut Chaithanasakun and Udon Khaimuk (THA)	Aung San Oo and Kyaw Oo (MYA)	Geet Sethi and Ashok Shandilya (IND)

=== Eight-ball singles ===
Games	Gold	Silver	Bronze
1998 Bangkok	Chao Fong-pang (TPE)	Tan Tiong Boon (SIN)	Kunihiko Takahashi (JPN)
2002 Busan	Hsia Hui-kai (TPE)	Huang Kun-chang (TPE)	Efren Reyes (PHI)
2006 Doha	Satoshi Kawabata (JPN)	Antonio Gabica (PHI)	Huang Kun-chang (TPE)
2010 Guangzhou	Kuo Po-cheng (TPE)	Ibrahim Amir (MAS)	Irsal Nasution (INA)
2010 Guangzhou	Kuo Po-cheng (TPE)	Ibrahim Amir (MAS)	Alok Kumar (IND)

=== Eight-ball doubles ===
Games	Gold	Silver	Bronze
1998 Bangkok	Lai Chia-hsiung and Chang Hao-ping (TPE)	Yang Ching-shun and Chao Fong-pang (TPE)	Kunihiko Takahashi and Satoshi Kawabata (JPN)

=== Nine-ball singles ===
Games	Gold	Silver	Bronze
1998 Bangkok	Yang Ching-shun (TPE)	Kunihiko Takahashi (JPN)	Chao Fong-pang (TPE)
2002 Busan	Yang Ching-shun (TPE)	Warren Kiamco (PHI)	Jeong Young-hwa (KOR)
2006 Doha	Antonio Gabica (PHI)	Jeff de Luna (PHI)	Yang Ching-shun (TPE)
2010 Guangzhou	Dennis Orcollo (PHI)	Warren Kiamco (PHI)	Jeong Young-hwa (KOR)
2010 Guangzhou	Dennis Orcollo (PHI)	Warren Kiamco (PHI)	Ko Pin-yi (TPE)

=== Nine-ball doubles ===
Games	Gold	Silver	Bronze
1998 Bangkok	Gandy Valle and Romeo Villanueva (PHI)	Lai Chia-hsiung and Chang Hao-ping (TPE)	Anan Terananon and Worawit Suriyasriwan (THA)
2002 Busan	Francisco Bustamante and Antonio Lining (PHI)	Jeong Young-hwa and Kim Won-suk (KOR)	Khaled Al-Mutairi and Aref Al-Awadhi (KUW)

=== Snooker singles ===
Games	Gold	Silver	Bronze
1998 Bangkok	Shokat Ali (PAK)	Sam Chong (MAS)	Chan Kwok Ming (HKG)
2002 Busan	Ding Junhui (CHN)	Supoj Saenla (THA)	Chan Kwok Ming (HKG)
2006 Doha	Ding Junhui (CHN)	Liang Wenbo (CHN)	Atthasit Mahitthi (THA)
2010 Guangzhou	Marco Fu (HKG)	Ding Junhui (CHN)	Aditya Mehta (IND)
2010 Guangzhou	Marco Fu (HKG)	Ding Junhui (CHN)	Dechawat Poomjaeng (THA)

=== Snooker doubles ===
Games	Gold	Silver	Bronze
1998 Bangkok	Sam Chong and Ooi Chin Kay (MAS)	Phaitoon Phonbun and Noppadon Noppachorn (THA)	Shokat Ali and Saleh Mohammad (PAK)
2002 Busan	Yasin Merchant and Rafat Habib (IND)	Marco Fu and Au Chi Wai (HKG)	Saleh Mohammad and Naveen Perwani (PAK)
2006 Doha	Ding Junhui and Tian Pengfei (CHN)	Chan Wai Ki and Marco Fu (HKG)	Atthasit Mahitthi and Phaitoon Phonbun (THA)

=== Snooker team ===
Games	Gold	Silver	Bronze
1998 Bangkok	Hong Kong (HKG); Chan Kwok Ming; Chan Wai Tat; Marco Fu	Thailand (THA); Wattana Pu-ob-orm; Phaitoon Phonbun; Chuchart Trirattanapradit; Noppadon Noppachorn	Pakistan (PAK); Shokat Ali; Farhan Mirza; Saleh Mohammad
2002 Busan	Hong Kong (HKG); Chan Kwok Ming; Marco Fu; Fung Kwok Wai	China (CHN); Ding Junhui; Jin Long; Pang Weiguo	Pakistan (PAK); Saleh Mohammad; Naveen Perwani; Muhammad Yousaf
2006 Doha	China (CHN); Liang Wenbo; Tian Pengfei; Ding Junhui	Hong Kong (HKG); Fung Kwok Wai; Marco Fu; Chan Wai Ki	India (IND); Aditya Mehta; Yasin Merchant; Rupesh Shah
2010 Guangzhou	China (CHN); Ding Junhui; Liang Wenbo; Tian Pengfei	India (IND); Brijesh Damani; Aditya Mehta; Yasin Merchant	Pakistan (PAK); Shahram Changezi; Imran Shahzad; Sohail Shahzad
2010 Guangzhou	China (CHN); Ding Junhui; Liang Wenbo; Tian Pengfei	India (IND); Brijesh Damani; Aditya Mehta; Yasin Merchant	Thailand (THA); Noppadon Noppachorn; Ratchapol Pu-ob-orm; Thepchaiya Un-nooh

== Women ==
=== Eight-ball singles ===
Games	Gold	Silver	Bronze
2006 Doha	Lin Yuan-chun (TPE)	Kim Ga-young (KOR)	Pan Xiaoting (CHN)
2010 Guangzhou	Liu Shasha (CHN)	Kim Ga-young (KOR)	Chang Shu-han (TPE)
2010 Guangzhou	Liu Shasha (CHN)	Kim Ga-young (KOR)	Chou Chieh-yu (TPE)

=== Nine-ball singles ===
Games	Gold	Silver	Bronze
2006 Doha	Liu Shin-mei (TPE)	Esther Kwan (MAS)	Pan Xiaoting (CHN)
2010 Guangzhou	Pan Xiaoting (CHN)	Chou Chieh-yu (TPE)	Fu Xiaofang (CHN)
2010 Guangzhou	Pan Xiaoting (CHN)	Chou Chieh-yu (TPE)	Lin Yuan-chun (TPE)

=== Six-red snooker singles ===
Games	Gold	Silver	Bronze
2010 Guangzhou	Chen Siming (CHN)	Lai Hui-shan (TPE)	Bi Zhuqing (CHN)
2010 Guangzhou	Chen Siming (CHN)	Lai Hui-shan (TPE)	Ng On Yee (HKG)

=== Six-red snooker team ===
Games	Gold	Silver	Bronze
2010 Guangzhou	Hong Kong (HKG); Jaique Ip; Ng On Yee; So Man Yan	China (CHN); Bi Zhuqing; Chen Siming; Chen Xue	Thailand (THA); Suweenut Maungin; Nicha Pathomekmongkhon; Maliwan Sangklar
2010 Guangzhou	Hong Kong (HKG); Jaique Ip; Ng On Yee; So Man Yan	China (CHN); Bi Zhuqing; Chen Siming; Chen Xue	Chinese Taipei (TPE); Chan Ya-ting; Lai Hui-shan; Liu Shin-mei
