= Cue sports at the 2002 Asian Games =

- Venue: Dongju College Gymnasium
- Dates: 1–8 October 2002
- Competitors: 132 from 21 nations

Cue sports was one of the many sports which was held at the 2002 Asian Games in Busan, South Korea, between 1 and 8 October 2002. The competition took place at Dongju College Gymnasium. The competition included only men's events.

There were ten events at the competition, Carom billiards, English billiards, Pool and Snooker.

== Schedule ==
P	Preliminary rounds	¼	Quarterfinals	½	Semifinals	F	Finals

Event↓/Date →	1st Tue				2nd Wed		3rd Thu			4th Fri	5th Sat				6th Sun			7th Mon			8th Tue
Three-cushion singles											P				¼		½	F			
Straight rail singles					P		¼		½	F											
English billiards singles																		P	¼	½	F
English billiards doubles															¼	½	F				
Eight-ball singles					P		¼	½	F												
Nine-ball singles										P	P	¼	½	F							
Nine-ball doubles															P	¼	½	F			
Snooker singles										P	¼		½	F							
Snooker doubles	P	¼	½	F																	
Snooker team					P	¼	¼	½	F												

== Medalists ==
Event	Gold	Silver	Bronze
Three-cushion singles	Hwang Deuk-hee; South Korea	Lee Sang-chun; South Korea	Akio Shimada; Japan
Straight rail singles	Trần Đình Hòa; Vietnam	Dương Hoàng Anh; Vietnam	Nobuaki Kobayashi; Japan
English billiards singles	Praprut Chaithanasakun; Thailand	Kyaw Oo; Myanmar	Geet Sethi; India
English billiards doubles	Thailand; Praprut Chaithanasakun; Mongkhon Kanfaklang	India; Geet Sethi; Alok Kumar	Myanmar; Kyaw Oo; Aung San Oo
Eight-ball singles	Hsia Hui-kai; Chinese Taipei	Huang Kun-chang; Chinese Taipei	Efren Reyes; Philippines
Nine-ball singles	Yang Ching-shun; Chinese Taipei	Warren Kiamco; Philippines	Jeong Young-hwa; South Korea
Nine-ball doubles	Philippines; Francisco Bustamante; Antonio Lining	South Korea; Jeong Young-hwa; Kim Won-suk	Kuwait; Khaled Al-Mutairi; Aref Al-Awadhi
Snooker singles	Ding Junhui; China	Supoj Saenla; Thailand	Chan Kwok Ming; Hong Kong
Snooker doubles	India; Yasin Merchant; Rafat Habib	Hong Kong; Marco Fu; Au Chi Wai	Pakistan; Saleh Mohammad; Naveen Perwani
Snooker team	Hong Kong; Chan Kwok Ming; Marco Fu; Fung Kwok Wai	China; Ding Junhui; Jin Long; Pang Weiguo	Pakistan; Saleh Mohammad; Naveen Perwani; Muhammad Yousaf

== Medal table ==
Rank	Nation	Gold	Silver	Bronze	Total
1	Chinese Taipei (TPE)	2	1	0	3
1	Thailand (THA)	2	1	0	3
3	South Korea (KOR)	1	2	1	4
4	Hong Kong (HKG)	1	1	1	3
4	India (IND)	1	1	1	3
4	Philippines (PHI)	1	1	1	3
7	China (CHN)	1	1	0	2
7	Vietnam (VIE)	1	1	0	2
9	Myanmar (MYA)	0	1	1	2
10	Japan (JPN)	0	0	2	2
10	Pakistan (PAK)	0	0	2	2
12	Kuwait (KUW)	0	0	1	1
Totals (12 entries)		10	10	10	30

== Participating nations ==
A total of 132 athletes from 21 nations competed in cue sports at the 2002 Asian Games:

- Brunei (6)
- Cambodia (2)
- China (5)
- Chinese Taipei (10)
- Hong Kong (4)
- India (12)
- Indonesia (3)
- Japan (9)
- Kuwait (4)
- Macau (5)
- Malaysia (7)
- Myanmar (2)
- Pakistan (7)
- Philippines (9)
- Qatar (8)
- Singapore (5)
- South Korea (12)
- Sri Lanka (2)
- Thailand (11)
- United Arab Emirates (3)
- Vietnam (6)
