= Cue sports at the 2002 Asian Games – Men's snooker team =

Men's snooker team at the 2002 Asian Games
- Venue: Dongju College Gymnasium
- Dates: 2–3 October 2002
- Competitors: 42 from 14 nations

Medalists
gold medal	Hong Kong; Chan Kwok Ming, Marco Fu, Fung Kwok Wai
silver medal	China; Ding Junhui, Jin Long, Pang Weiguo
bronze medal	Pakistan; Saleh Mohammad, Naveen Perwani, Muhammad Yousaf

The men's snooker team tournament at the 2002 Asian Games in Busan took place from 2 to 3 October 2002 at Dongju College Gymnasium.

14 teams entered for the tournament. The teams were seeded based on their final ranking at the same event at the 1998 Asian Games in Bangkok. Chan Kwok Ming, Marco Fu and Fung Kwok Chai lifted the Snooker Team Gold in Busan on Thursday with a 2–1 win over the strong Chinese Team (Pang Weiguo, Jin Long, Ding Jun Hui) in the final. Pakistan picked up the bronze medal after beating Malaysia 3–0 in the third place play off.

== Schedule ==
All times are Korea Standard Time (UTC+09:00)

Date	Time	Event
Wednesday, 2 October 2002	10:00	Pre-quarterfinals
Wednesday, 2 October 2002	19:00	Quarterfinals
Thursday, 3 October 2002	10:00	Quarterfinals
Thursday, 3 October 2002	13:00	Semifinals
Thursday, 3 October 2002	16:00	Finals

== Results ==
Pre-quarterfinals
Kamarulzaman Pungut (BRU); Randy Wong (BRU); Shari Hj Emran (BRU)	3
Lee Wan-soo (KOR); Lee Jae-ho (KOR); Park Seung-chil (KOR)	0
Mohammed Al-Jokar (UAE); Eissa Al-Sayed (UAE); Mohammed Shehab (UAE)	2
Adel Al-Amadi (QAT); Mohsen Bukshaisha (QAT); Ahmed Al-Sada (QAT)	1
Wong Chan Keong (MAC); Mok Sek Kei (MAC); Si Tou Chong Wut (MAC)	0
4	Sam Chong (MAS); Ng Ann Seng (MAS); Patrick Ooi (MAS)	3
3	Naveen Perwani (PAK); Saleh Mohammad (PAK); Muhammad Yousaf (PAK)	3
Ang Boon Chin (SIN); Keith E (SIN); Marvin Lim (SIN)	0
Ku Chih-wei (TPE); Yang Ching-shun (TPE); Lee Kun-fang (TPE)	1
Benjamin Guevarra (PHI); Marlon Manalo (PHI); James Ortega (PHI)	2
Pang Weiguo (CHN); Ding Junhui (CHN); Jin Long (CHN)	2
Pankaj Advani (IND); Yasin Merchant (IND); Manan Chandra (IND)	1

Quarterfinals
1	Marco Fu (HKG); Chan Kwok Ming (HKG); Fung Kwok Wai (HKG)	3
Kamarulzaman Pungut (BRU); Shari Hj Emran (BRU); Randy Wong (BRU)	0
Mohammed Al-Jokar (UAE); Eissa Al-Sayed (UAE); Mohammed Shehab (UAE)	0
4	Patrick Ooi (MAS); Sam Chong (MAS); Ng Ann Seng (MAS)	3
3	Saleh Mohammad (PAK); Naveen Perwani (PAK); Muhammad Yousaf (PAK)	2
Benjamin Guevarra (PHI); Marlon Manalo (PHI); James Ortega (PHI)	1
Jin Long (CHN); Pang Weiguo (CHN); Ding Junhui (CHN)	2
2	Sahatat Wiwatarangkoon (THA); Supoj Saenla (THA); Wanshana Poomjaeng (THA)	1

Semifinals
1	Chan Kwok Ming (HKG); Fung Kwok Wai (HKG); Marco Fu (HKG)	2
4	Ng Ann Seng (MAS); Sam Chong (MAS); Patrick Ooi (MAS)	1
3	Naveen Perwani (PAK); Saleh Mohammad (PAK); Muhammad Yousaf (PAK)	0
Pang Weiguo (CHN); Ding Junhui (CHN); Jin Long (CHN)	3

Final
1	Marco Fu (HKG); Fung Kwok Wai (HKG); Chan Kwok Ming (HKG)	2
Pang Weiguo (CHN); Ding Junhui (CHN); Jin Long (CHN)	1
3rd/4th place
4	Ng Ann Seng (MAS); Patrick Ooi (MAS); Sam Chong (MAS)	0
3	Muhammad Yousaf (PAK); Saleh Mohammad (PAK); Naveen Perwani (PAK)	3
