= Cue sports at the 2002 Asian Games – Men's snooker singles =

Men's snooker singles at the 2002 Asian Games
- Venue: Dongju College Gymnasium
- Dates: 4–5 October 2002
- Competitors: 31 from 16 nations

Medalists
gold medal	Ding Junhui	China
silver medal	Supoj Saenla	Thailand
bronze medal	Chan Kwok Ming	Hong Kong

The men's snooker singles tournament at the 2002 Asian Games in Busan took place from 4 October to 5 October at Dongju College Gymnasium.

== Schedule ==
All times are Korea Standard Time (UTC+09:00)

Date	Time	Event
Friday, 4 October 2002	10:00	Preliminary 32
Friday, 4 October 2002	16:00	Pre-quarterfinals
Saturday, 5 October 2002	10:00	Quarterfinals
Saturday, 5 October 2002	13:00	Semifinals
Saturday, 5 October 2002	16:00	Finals

== Results ==
=== Finals ===
Final
Supoj Saenla (THA)	1
Ding Junhui (CHN)	3

3rd/4th place
Chan Kwok Ming (HKG)	3
Neang Tola (CAM)	2

=== Top half ===
Preliminary 32
Marvin Lim (SIN)	1
Marlon Manalo (PHI)	3
Lee Jae-ho (KOR)	3
Chrin Sophanna (CAM)	1
Supoj Saenla (THA)	3
Lee Kun-fang (TPE)	0
Mohsen Bukshaisha (QAT)	1
Mok Sek Kei (MAC)	3
Chan Kwok Ming (HKG)	3
Randy Wong (BRU)	0
Jin Long (CHN)	3
Yasin Merchant (IND)	1
Mohammed Al-Jokar (UAE)	0
4	Ng Ann Seng (MAS)	3

Pre-quarterfinals
1	Muhammad Yousaf (PAK)	3
Marlon Manalo (PHI)	2
Lee Jae-ho (KOR)	0
Supoj Saenla (THA)	3
Mok Sek Kei (MAC)	1
Chan Kwok Ming (HKG)	3
Jin Long (CHN)	2
4	Ng Ann Seng (MAS)	3

Quarterfinals
1	Muhammad Yousaf (PAK)	2
Supoj Saenla (THA)	3
Chan Kwok Ming (HKG)	3
4	Ng Ann Seng (MAS)	2

Semifinals
Supoj Saenla (THA)	3
Chan Kwok Ming (HKG)	2

=== Bottom half ===
Preliminary 32
3	Marco Fu (HKG)	3
Wong Chan Keong (MAC)	0
Noppadol Sangnil (THA)	1
Manan Chandra (IND)	3
Neang Tola (CAM)	3
Shari Hj Emran (BRU)	2
Keith E (SIN)	3
Ahmed Saif (QAT)	0
Park Seung-chil (KOR)	0
Ku Chih-wei (TPE)	3
Ding Junhui (CHN)	3
Shinya Egashira (JPN)	0
Mohammed Shehab (UAE)	3
James Ortega (PHI)	0
Saleh Mohammad (PAK)	3
2	Sam Chong (MAS)	2

Pre-quarterfinals
3	Marco Fu (HKG)	1
Manan Chandra (IND)	3
Neang Tola (CAM)	3
Keith E (SIN)	2
Ku Chih-wei (TPE)	1
Ding Junhui (CHN)	3
Mohammed Shehab (UAE)	0
Saleh Mohammad (PAK)	3

Quarterfinals
Manan Chandra (IND)	1
Neang Tola (CAM)	3
Ding Junhui (CHN)	3
Saleh Mohammad (PAK)	0

Semifinals
Neang Tola (CAM)	1
Ding Junhui (CHN)	3
