= Cue sports at the 2006 Asian Games – Men's snooker singles =

Cue sports Asian Games event

Men's snooker singles at the 2006 Asian Games
- Venue: Al-Sadd Multi-Purpose Hall
- Dates: 6–7 December 2006
- Competitors: 44 from 24 nations

Medalists
gold medal	Ding Junhui	China
silver medal	Liang Wenbo	China
bronze medal	Atthasit Mahitthi	Thailand

The men's snooker singles tournament at the 2006 Asian Games in Doha took place from 6 December to 7 December at Al-Sadd Multi-Purpose Hall.

Ding Junhui won the competition by beating Liang Wenbo 4–2 in the final.

== Schedule ==
All times are Arabia Standard Time (UTC+03:00)

Date	Time	Event
Wednesday, 6 December 2006	10:00	Round of 64
Wednesday, 6 December 2006	10:00	Round of 32
Thursday, 7 December 2006	10:00	Round of 16
Thursday, 7 December 2006	13:00	Quarterfinals
Thursday, 7 December 2006	16:00	Semifinals
Thursday, 7 December 2006	19:30	Finals

== Results ==
Legend

- WO — Won by walkover

=== Finals ===
Semifinals
1	Ding Junhui (CHN)	4
Atthasit Mahitthi (THA)	1
Liang Wenbo (CHN)	4
Mohammed Shehab (UAE)	3

Gold medal match
1	Ding Junhui (CHN)	4
Liang Wenbo (CHN)	2
Bronze medal match
Atthasit Mahitthi (THA)	4
Mohammed Shehab (UAE)	2

=== Top half ===
==== Section 1 ====
Round of 64
Mohammed Al-Jokar (UAE)	2
Khurram Hussain Agha (PAK)	4
Thor Chuan Leong (MAS)	1
Saleh Mohammad (AFG)	4
Si Tou Chong Wut (MAC)	3
Ammar Taqi (KUW)	4

Round of 32
1	Ding Junhui (CHN)	4
Lương Chí Dũng (VIE)	0
Tseveendashiin Temüüjin (MGL)	4
Felipe Tauro (PHI)	2
Khurram Hussain Agha (PAK)	4
Saleh Mohammad (AFG)	3
Ammar Taqi (KUW)	0
Fung Kwok Wai (HKG)	4

Round of 16
1	Ding Junhui (CHN)	4
Tseveendashiin Temüüjin (MGL)	0
Khurram Hussain Agha (PAK)	2
Fung Kwok Wai (HKG)	4

Quarterfinals
1	Ding Junhui (CHN)	4
Fung Kwok Wai (HKG)	3

==== Section 2 ====
Round of 64
Yasin Merchant (IND)	4
Firas Kamel (IRQ)	3
Munther Al-Basri (BRN)	4
Wela Henrige Jayawardena (SRI)	3
Jung Tae-hoon (KOR)	0
Nezar Aseeri (KSA)	4

Round of 32
Yasin Merchant (IND)	4
Munther Al-Basri (BRN)	1
Mohsen Bukshaisha (QAT)	1
Nezar Aseeri (KSA)	4
Atthasit Mahitthi (THA)	4
Ku Chih-wei (TPE)	2
Salman Haroon (BAN)	WO
4	Neang Tola (CAM)

Round of 16
Yasin Merchant (IND)	0
Nezar Aseeri (KSA)	4
Atthasit Mahitthi (THA)	4
Salman Haroon (BAN)	1

Quarterfinals
Nezar Aseeri (KSA)	0
Atthasit Mahitthi (THA)	4

=== Bottom half ===
==== Section 3 ====
Round of 64
Manan Chandra (IND)	4
Mubarak Al-Owais (KUW)	1
Reenat Walem (IRQ)	4
Vong Wai Si (MAC)	0
Habib Subah (BRN)	4
Zamarai Asaas (AFG)	1

Round of 32
3	Marco Fu (HKG)	4
Keith E (SIN)	1
Đỗ Hoàng Quân (VIE)	4
Lee Po-hsien (TPE)	2
Manan Chandra (IND)	2
Reenat Walem (IRQ)	4
Habib Subah (BRN)	3
Liang Wenbo (CHN)	4

Round of 16
3	Marco Fu (HKG)	4
Đỗ Hoàng Quân (VIE)	0
Reenat Walem (IRQ)	3
Liang Wenbo (CHN)	4

Quarterfinals
3	Marco Fu (HKG)	3
Liang Wenbo (CHN)	4

==== Section 4 ====
Round of 64
Ahmed Aseeri (KSA)	0
Moh Keen Hoo (MAS)	4
Lee Wan-soo (KOR)	2
Shokat Ali (PAK)	4
Prasanna Pushpakumara (SRI)	0
Mohammed Shehab (UAE)	4

Round of 32
Moh Keen Hoo (MAS)	4
Shokat Ali (PAK)	1
Chrin Sophanna (CAM)	1
Mohammed Shehab (UAE)	4
Ahmed Saif (QAT)	4
Tüvshinjargalyn Khash-Ochir (MGL)	1
Ahmad Al-Okaily (JOR)
2	Supoj Saenla (THA)	WO

Round of 16
Moh Keen Hoo (MAS)	2
Mohammed Shehab (UAE)	4
Ahmed Saif (QAT)	1
2	Supoj Saenla (THA)	4

Quarterfinals
Mohammed Shehab (UAE)	4
2	Supoj Saenla (THA)	1
