= Cue sports at the 2002 Asian Games – Men's nine-ball singles =

Men's nine-ball singles at the 2002 Asian Games
- Venue: Dongju College Gymnasium
- Dates: 4–5 October 2002
- Competitors: 32 from 16 nations

Medalists
gold medal	Yang Ching-shun	Chinese Taipei
silver medal	Warren Kiamco	Philippines
bronze medal	Jeong Young-hwa	South Korea

The men's nine-ball singles tournament at the 2002 Asian Games in Busan took place from 4 October to 5 October at Dongju College Gymnasium.

== Schedule ==
All times are Korea Standard Time (UTC+09:00)

Date	Time	Event
Friday, 4 October 2002	10:00	Preliminary 32
Friday, 4 October 2002	19:00	Pre-quarterfinals
Saturday, 5 October 2002	10:00	Pre-quarterfinals
Saturday, 5 October 2002	13:00	Quarterfinals
Saturday, 5 October 2002	16:00	Semifinals
Saturday, 5 October 2002	19:00	Finals

== Results ==
=== Finals ===
Final
1	Yang Ching-shun (TPE)	11
	Warren Kiamco (PHI)	3

3rd/4th place
Antonio Lining (PHI)	5
Jeong Young-hwa (KOR)	11

=== Top half ===
Preliminary 32
1	Yang Ching-shun (TPE)	11
Imran Shahzad (PAK)	6
Fu Jianbo (CHN)	11
Ibrahim Amir (MAS)	10
Bernard Tey (SIN)	11
Dharminder Lilly (IND)	4
Henry Boteju (SRI)	11
Al-Muhtadee Billah (BRU)	0
Park Shin-young (KOR)	11
Kiyotaka Ohashi (JPN)	6
Ieng San Fat (MAC)	4
Antonio Lining (PHI)	11
Mishal Al-Kandari (KUW)	3
Muhamad Junarto (INA)	11
Nasser Al-Hebabi (QAT)	1
4	Surathep Phoochalam (THA)	11

Pre-quarterfinals
1	Yang Ching-shun (TPE)	11
Fu Jianbo (CHN)	7
Bernard Tey (SIN)	11
Henry Boteju (SRI)	6
Park Shin-young (KOR)	8
Antonio Lining (PHI)	11
Muhamad Junarto (INA)	8
4	Surathep Phoochalam (THA)	11

Quarterfinals
1	Yang Ching-shun (TPE)	11
Bernard Tey (SIN)	3
Antonio Lining (PHI)	11
4	Surathep Phoochalam (THA)	3

Semifinals
1	Yang Ching-shun (TPE)	11
Antonio Lining (PHI)	10

=== Bottom half ===
Preliminary 32
3	Chen Huang-wu (TPE)	11
Khurram Hussain Agha (PAK)	2
Alan Tan (MAS)	7
Jeong Young-hwa (KOR)	11
Tareq Al-Mulla (KUW)	11
Khobala Sirisoma (SRI)	4
Chatchawan Rutphae (THA)	11
Tan Tiong Boon (SIN)	8
Wong Tin Hong (MAC)	1
Warren Kiamco (PHI)	11
Siauw Wieto (INA)	11
Lim Tat Hwe (BRU)	8
Mubarak Al-Khayarin (QAT)	5
Zhang Kai (CHN)	11
Mukesh Rehani (IND)	11
2	Akikumo Toshikawa (JPN)	7

Pre-quarterfinals
3	Chen Huang-wu (TPE)	10
Jeong Young-hwa (KOR)	11
Tareq Al-Mulla (KUW)	10
Chatchawan Rutphae (THA)	11
Warren Kiamco (PHI)	11
Siauw Wieto (INA)	4
Zhang Kai (CHN)	9
Mukesh Rehani (IND)	11

Quarterfinals
Jeong Young-hwa (KOR)	11
Chatchawan Rutphae (THA)	2
Warren Kiamco (PHI)	11
Mukesh Rehani (IND)	7

Semifinals
Jeong Young-hwa (KOR)	8
Warren Kiamco (PHI)	11
