= Cue sports at the 2006 Asian Games – Men's snooker doubles =

Asian Games snooker event

Men's snooker doubles at the 2006 Asian Games
- Venue: Al-Sadd Multi-Purpose Hall
- Dates: 4–5 December 2006
- Competitors: 44 from 22 nations

Medalists
gold medal	Ding Junhui; Tian Pengfei	China
silver medal	Chan Wai Ki; Marco Fu	Hong Kong
bronze medal	Atthasit Mahitthi; Phaitoon Phonbun	Thailand

The men's snooker doubles tournament at the 2006 Asian Games in Doha took place from 4 December to 5 December at Al-Sadd Multi-Purpose Hall.

== Schedule ==
All times are Arabia Standard Time (UTC+03:00)

Date	Time	Event
Monday, 4 December 2006	10:00	Round of 32
Monday, 4 December 2006	13:30	Round of 16
Monday, 4 December 2006	16:00	Quarterfinals
Monday, 4 December 2006	20:35	Semifinals
Tuesday, 5 December 2006	19:30	Finals

== Results ==
Legend

- WO — Won by walkover

=== Finals ===
Gold medal match
	Ding Junhui (CHN); Tian Pengfei (CHN)	3
2	Chan Wai Ki (HKG); Marco Fu (HKG)	1

Bronze medal match
Atthasit Mahitthi (THA); Phaitoon Phonbun (THA)	3
Lai Chee Wei (MAS); Moh Keen Hoo (MAS)	1

=== Top half ===
Round of 32
Reenat Walem (IRQ); Firas Kamel (IRQ)	1
Altanzulyn Mönkhgerel (MGL); Tüvshinjargalyn Khash-Ochir (MGL)	3
Mohammed Shehab (UAE); Mohammed Al-Jokar (UAE)	3
Zia Azad (BAN); Salman Haroon (BAN)	2
Si Tou Chong Wut (MAC); Vong Tin Hong (MAC)	1
Ding Junhui (CHN); Tian Pengfei (CHN)	3

Round of 16
1	Manan Chandra (IND); Yasin Merchant (IND)	3
Wela Henrige Jayawardena (SRI); Prasanna Pushpakumara (SRI)	0
Atthasit Mahitthi (THA); Phaitoon Phonbun (THA)	3
Altanzulyn Mönkhgerel (MGL); Tüvshinjargalyn Khash-Ochir (MGL)	0
Mohammed Shehab (UAE); Mohammed Al-Jokar (UAE)	0
Ding Junhui (CHN); Tian Pengfei (CHN)	3
Mohsen Bukshaisha (QAT); Ahmed Saif (QAT)	3
4	Ku Chih-wei (TPE); Lee Po-hsien (TPE)	2

Quarterfinals
1	Manan Chandra (IND); Yasin Merchant (IND)	1
Atthasit Mahitthi (THA); Phaitoon Phonbun (THA)	3
Ding Junhui (CHN); Tian Pengfei (CHN)	3
Mohsen Bukshaisha (QAT); Ahmed Saif (QAT)	0

Semifinals
Atthasit Mahitthi (THA); Phaitoon Phonbun (THA)	2
Ding Junhui (CHN); Tian Pengfei (CHN)	3

=== Bottom half ===
Round of 32
Keith E (SIN); Peter Gilchrist (SIN)
Lai Chee Wei (MAS); Moh Keen Hoo (MAS)	WO
Đỗ Hoàng Quân (VIE); Lương Chí Dũng (VIE)	3
Leonardo Andam (PHI); Alvin Punzalan (PHI)	0
Munther Al-Basri (BRN); Habib Subah (BRN)	3
Ahmed Aseeri (KSA); Nezar Aseeri (KSA)	1

Round of 16
3	Naveen Perwani (PAK); Muhammad Yousaf (PAK)	3
Jung Tae-hoon (KOR); Lee Wan-soo (KOR)	0
Lai Chee Wei (MAS); Moh Keen Hoo (MAS)	3
Đỗ Hoàng Quân (VIE); Lương Chí Dũng (VIE)	1
Munther Al-Basri (BRN); Habib Subah (BRN)	3
Ibrahim Al-Fawdari (KUW); Ahmad Al-Tarkait (KUW)	0
Chrin Sophanna (CAM); Neang Tola (CAM)	1
2	Chan Wai Ki (HKG); Marco Fu (HKG)	3

Quarterfinals
3	Naveen Perwani (PAK); Muhammad Yousaf (PAK)	1
Lai Chee Wei (MAS); Moh Keen Hoo (MAS)	3
Munther Al-Basri (BRN); Habib Subah (BRN)	2
2	Chan Wai Ki (HKG); Marco Fu (HKG)	3

Semifinals
Lai Chee Wei (MAS); Moh Keen Hoo (MAS)	0
2	Chan Wai Ki (HKG); Marco Fu (HKG)	3
