= Cue sports at the 2002 Asian Games – Men's nine-ball doubles =

Men's nine-ball doubles at the 2002 Asian Games
- Venue: Dongju College Gymnasium
- Dates: 6–7 October 2002
- Competitors: 32 from 16 nations

Medalists
gold medal	Francisco Bustamante; Antonio Lining	Philippines
silver medal	Jeong Young-hwa; Kim Won-suk	South Korea
bronze medal	Khaled Al-Mutairi; Aref Al-Awadhi	Kuwait

The men's nine-ball doubles tournament at the 2002 Asian Games in Busan took place from 6 October to 7 October at Dongju College Gymnasium.

16 teams entered for the tournament. The teams were seeded based on their final ranking at the same event at the 1998 Asian Games in Bangkok.

Top seed Philippines (Francisco Bustamante and Antonio Lining) won the gold after beating South Korean team of Jeong Young-hwa and Kim Won-suk in the final 11 to 9. Kuwait (Khaled Al-Mutairi and Aref Al-Awadhi) won the bronze medal after an 11–6 win against Japan in bronze medal match.

== Schedule ==
All times are Korea Standard Time (UTC+09:00)

Date	Time	Event
Sunday, 6 October 2002	10:00	Pre-quarterfinals
Sunday, 6 October 2002	16:00	Quarterfinals
Sunday, 6 October 2002	19:00	Semifinals
Monday, 7 October 2002	10:00	Finals

== Results ==
Pre-quarterfinals
1	Francisco Bustamante (PHI); Antonio Lining (PHI)	11
Ibrahim Amir (MAS); Alan Tan (MAS)	6
Zhang Kai (CHN); Fu Jianbo (CHN)	11
Muhamad Junarto (INA); Siauw Wieto (INA)	9
Khurram Hussain Agha (PAK); Arifullah (PAK)	8
Khaled Al-Mutairi (KUW); Aref Al-Awadhi (KUW)	11
Henry Boteju (SRI); Khobala Sirisoma (SRI)	0
Ieng San Fat (MAC); Wong Tin Hong (MAC)	11
3	Surathep Phoochalam (THA); Chatchawan Rutphae (THA)	7
Jeong Young-hwa (KOR); Kim Won-suk (KOR)	11
Mohammed Al-Binali (QAT); Mubarak Al-Khayarin (QAT)	0
Tan Tiong Boon (SIN); Bernard Tey (SIN)	11
Kunihiko Takahashi (JPN); Akikumo Toshikawa (JPN)	11
Dharminder Lilly (IND); Amit Khansaheb (IND)	7
Al-Muhtadee Billah (BRU); Lim Tat Hwe (BRU)	0
2	Chen Wei-chih (TPE); Fu Che-wei (TPE)	11

Quarterfinals
1	Francisco Bustamante (PHI); Antonio Lining (PHI)	11
Zhang Kai (CHN); Fu Jianbo (CHN)	8
Khaled Al-Mutairi (KUW); Aref Al-Awadhi (KUW)	11
Ieng San Fat (MAC); Wong Tin Hong (MAC)	1
Jeong Young-hwa (KOR); Kim Won-suk (KOR)	11
Tan Tiong Boon (SIN); Bernard Tey (SIN)	4
Kunihiko Takahashi (JPN); Akikumo Toshikawa (JPN)	11
2	Chen Wei-chih (TPE); Fu Che-wei (TPE)	9

Semifinals
1	Francisco Bustamante (PHI); Antonio Lining (PHI)	11
Khaled Al-Mutairi (KUW); Aref Al-Awadhi (KUW)	5
Jeong Young-hwa (KOR); Kim Won-suk (KOR)	11
Kunihiko Takahashi (JPN); Akikumo Toshikawa (JPN)	9

Final
1	Francisco Bustamante (PHI); Antonio Lining (PHI)	11
Jeong Young-hwa (KOR); Kim Won-suk (KOR)	9
3rd/4th place
Khaled Al-Mutairi (KUW); Aref Al-Awadhi (KUW)	11
Kunihiko Takahashi (JPN); Akikumo Toshikawa (JPN)	6
