= Cue sports at the 2010 Asian Games – Men's snooker team =

Men's snooker team at the 2010 Asian Games
- Venue: Asian Games Town Gymnasium
- Dates: 13–15 November 2010
- Competitors: 58 from 20 nations

Medalists
gold medal	China; Ding Junhui, Liang Wenbo, Tian Pengfei
silver medal	India; Brijesh Damani, Aditya Mehta, Yasin Merchant
bronze medal	Thailand; Noppadon Noppachorn, Ratchapol Pu-ob-orm, Thepchaiya Un-nooh
bronze medal	Pakistan; Shahram Changezi, Imran Shahzad, Sohail Shahzad

The men's snooker team tournament at the 2010 Asian Games in Guangzhou took place on November 13–15 at the Asian Games Town Gymnasium.

== Schedule ==
All times are China Standard Time (UTC+08:00)

Date	Time	Event
Saturday, 13 November 2010	10:00	Preliminary
Saturday, 13 November 2010	16:00	Last 16
Sunday, 14 November 2010	20:00	Quarterfinals
Monday, 15 November 2010	10:00	Semifinals
Monday, 15 November 2010	16:30	Final

== Results ==
=== Bracket ===
==== Final ====
Final
1	China	3
3	India	1

==== Top half ====
Preliminary
Syria	1
United Arab Emirates	3
Thailand	3
Lebanon	0

Last 16
1	China	3
United Arab Emirates	0
Qatar	3
South Korea	1
Iran	3
Philippines	1
Thailand	3
4	Malaysia	0

Quarterfinals
1	China	3
Qatar	0
Iran	2
Thailand	3

Semifinals
1	China	3
Thailand	2

==== Bottom half ====
Preliminary
Saudi Arabia	0
Afghanistan	3
Pakistan	3
Athletes from Kuwait	0

Last 16
3	India	3
Afghanistan	2
Chinese Taipei	1
Singapore	3
Iraq	3
Mongolia	0
Pakistan	3
2	Hong Kong	1

Quarterfinals
3	India	3
Singapore	1
Iraq	0
Pakistan	3

Semifinals
3	India	3
Pakistan	0

=== Preliminary ===
Syria	1–3	United Arab Emirates

Omar Al-Kojah	1–0	Mohammed Shehab
Haitham Khalil	0–1	Mohammed Al-Jokar
Omar Al-Kojah / Haitham Khalil	0–1	Mohammed Shehab / Mohammed Al-Jokar
Omar Al-Kojah	0–1	Mohammed Al-Jokar

Thailand	3–0	Lebanon

Thepchaiya Un-nooh	1–0	Mazen Berjaoui
Noppadon Noppachorn	1–0	Mohamad Ali Berjaoui
Thepchaiya Un-nooh / Noppadon Noppachorn	1–0	Mazen Berjaoui / Mohamad Ali Berjaoui

Saudi Arabia	0–3	Afghanistan

Nezar Aseeri	0–1	Nader Khan Sultani
Abdulraouf Saigh	0–1	Saleh Mohammad
Abdulrahman Al-Ammar / Abdulraouf Saigh	0–1	Nader Khan Sultani / Saleh Mohammad

Pakistan	3–0	Athletes from Kuwait

Sohail Shahzad	1–0	Ahmad Al-Tarkait
Shahram Changezi	1–0	Meqdad Taqi
Sohail Shahzad / Shahram Changezi	1–0	Ahmad Al-Tarkait / Meqdad Taqi

=== Last 16 ===
China	3–0	United Arab Emirates

Liang Wenbo	1–0	Mohammed Shehab
Ding Junhui	1–0	Mohammed Al-Jokar
Ding Junhui / Tian Pengfei	1–0	Mohammed Shehab / Eissa Al-Sayed

Qatar	3–1	South Korea

Ali Al-Obaidly	1–0	Jung Tae-hoon
Ahmed Saif	0–1	Baek Min-hu
Ali Al-Obaidly / Ahmed Saif	1–0	Jung Tae-hoon / Hwang Chul-ho
Ali Al-Obaidly	1–0	Baek Min-hu

Iran	3–1	Philippines

Soheil Vahedi	1–0	Marlon Manalo
Ehsan Heidarinejad	1–0	Alvin Barbero
Soheil Vahedi / Ehsan Heidarinejad	0–1	Marlon Manalo / Alvin Barbero
Ehsan Heidarinejad	1–0	Marlon Manalo

Thailand	3–0	Malaysia

Ratchapol Pu-ob-orm	1–0	Moh Keen Hoo
Thepchaiya Un-nooh	1–0	Thor Chuan Leong
Ratchapol Pu-ob-orm / Thepchaiya Un-nooh	1–0	Moh Keen Hoo / Thor Chuan Leong

India	3–2	Afghanistan

Aditya Mehta	0–1	Nader Khan Sultani
Yasin Merchant	1–0	Saleh Mohammad
Yasin Merchant / Brijesh Damani	1–0	Nader Khan Sultani / Saleh Mohammad
Aditya Mehta	0–1	Saleh Mohammad
Yasin Merchant	1–0	Nader Khan Sultani

Chinese Taipei	1–3	Singapore

Lee Po-hsien	0–1	Marvin Lim
Wu Yu-lun	0–1	Ang Boon Chin
Lee Po-hsien / Wu Yu-lun	1–0	Marvin Lim / Ang Boon Chin
Wu Yu-lun	0–1	Marvin Lim

Iraq	3–0	Mongolia

Firas Kamel	1–0	Enkhtaivany Büüveibaatar
Ayhab Hasan	1–0	Davaasürengiin Ölziitogtokh
Firas Kamel / Ayhab Hasan	1–0	Enkhtaivany Büüveibaatar / Davaasürengiin Ölziitogtokh

Pakistan	3–1	Hong Kong

Shahram Changezi	1–0	Fung Kwok Wai
Imran Shahzad	0–1	Marco Fu
Imran Shahzad / Sohail Shahzad	1–0	Marco Fu / Chan Kwok Ming
Shahram Changezi	1–0	Marco Fu

=== Quarterfinals ===
China	3–0	Qatar

Ding Junhui	1–0	Ali Al-Obaidly
Liang Wenbo	1–0	Ahmed Saif
Ding Junhui / Tian Pengfei	1–0	Ali Al-Obaidly / Ahmed Saif

Iran	2–3	Thailand

Soheil Vahedi	0–1	Ratchapol Pu-ob-orm
Ehsan Heidarinejad	1–0	Thepchaiya Un-nooh
Soheil Vahedi / Hossein Vafaei	0–1	Ratchapol Pu-ob-orm / Thepchaiya Un-nooh
Ehsan Heidarinejad	1–0	Ratchapol Pu-ob-orm
Soheil Vahedi	0–1	Thepchaiya Un-nooh

India	3–1	Singapore

Aditya Mehta	1–0	Marvin Lim
Yasin Merchant	1–0	Ang Boon Chin
Yasin Merchant / Brijesh Damani	0–1	Marvin Lim / Ang Boon Chin
Aditya Mehta	1–0	Ang Boon Chin

Iraq	0–3	Pakistan

Firas Kamel	0–1	Shahram Changezi
Ayhab Hasan	0–1	Imran Shahzad
Firas Kamel / Ayhab Hasan	0–1	Imran Shahzad / Sohail Shahzad

=== Semifinals ===
China	3–2	Thailand

Ding Junhui	1–0	Ratchapol Pu-ob-orm
Liang Wenbo	0–1	Thepchaiya Un-nooh
Ding Junhui / Tian Pengfei	1–0	Ratchapol Pu-ob-orm / Thepchaiya Un-nooh
Liang Wenbo	0–1	Ratchapol Pu-ob-orm
Ding Junhui	1–0	Thepchaiya Un-nooh

India	3–0	Pakistan

Aditya Mehta	1–0	Sohail Shahzad
Yasin Merchant	1–0	Imran Shahzad
Yasin Merchant / Brijesh Damani	1–0	Imran Shahzad / Shahram Changezi

=== Final ===
China	3–1	India

Ding Junhui	1–0	Yasin Merchant
Liang Wenbo	0–1	Aditya Mehta
Ding Junhui / Tian Pengfei	1–0	Yasin Merchant / Aditya Mehta
Liang Wenbo	1–0	Yasin Merchant

== Non-participating athletes ==
- Mohammad Rais Senzahi (AFG)
- Ali Jalil (IRQ)
- Abdullah Al-Kandari (IOC)
- Lai Chee Wei (MAS)
- Tüvshinjargalyn Khash-Ochir (MGL)
- Benjamin Guevarra (PHI)
- Mohanna Al-Obaidly (QAT)
- Chan Keng Kwang (SIN)
- Karam Fatima (SYR)
