= Brijesh Damani =

Indian snooker player

Brijesh Damani (born 22 November 1982 at Kolkata, West Bengal) is an Indian snooker player. He won the 2008 Indian National Snooker Championship. He also won silver medal in 2010 Asian Games in China. Brijesh did his school from Shri Daulatram Nopany Vidyalaya, Kolkata

== Performance and rankings timeline ==
Tournament	2014/ 15
Ranking (Note: It shows the ranking at the beginning of the season)	(Note: He was an amateur)
Ranking tournaments
Indian Open	WR

Performance Table Legend
LQ	lost in the qualifying draw	#R	lost in the early rounds of the tournament (WR = Wildcard round, RR = Round robin)	QF	lost in the quarter-finals
SF	lost in the semi-finals	F	lost in the final	W	won the tournament
DNQ	did not qualify for the tournament	A	did not participate in the tournament	WD	withdrew from the tournament

NH / Not Held	means an event was not held.
NR / Non-Ranking Event	means an event is/was no longer a ranking event.
R / Ranking Event	means an event is/was a ranking event.
MR / Minor-Ranking Event	means an event is/was a minor-ranking event.

== Career finals ==
=== Team finals: 1 ===
Outcome	No.	Year	Championship	Team/Partner	Opponent(s) in the final	Score
Runner-up	1.	2010	Asian Games	India; Aditya Mehta; Yasin Merchant	China; Ding Junhui; Liang Wenbo; Tian Pengfei	1–3

=== Amateur finals: 2 ===
Outcome	No.	Year	Championship	Opponent in the final	Score
Runner-up	1.	2013	Indian Amateur Championship	(India) Manan Chandra	2–6
Runner-up	2.	2022	SAARC Championship	(India) Ishpreet Singh Chadha	3–7
