= Cue sports at the 2002 Asian Games – Men's snooker doubles =

Men's snooker doubles at the 2002 Asian Games
- Venue: Dongju College Gymnasium
- Dates: 1 October 2002
- Competitors: 30 from 15 nations

Medalists
gold medal	Yasin Merchant; Rafat Habib	India
silver medal	Marco Fu; Au Chi Wai	Hong Kong
bronze medal	Saleh Mohammad; Naveen Perwani	Pakistan

The men's snooker doubles tournament at the 2002 Asian Games in Busan took place on 1 October 2002 at Dongju College Gymnasium.

15 teams entered for the tournament. The teams were seeded based on their final ranking at the same event at the 1998 Asian Games in Bangkok.

India (Yasin Merchant and Rafat Habib) won the gold after beating Hong Kong team of Marco Fu and Au Chi Wai in the final 3 to 1. Pakistan (Saleh Mohammad and Naveen Perwani) won the bronze medal after a 3–1 win against Chinese Taipei in bronze medal match.

== Schedule ==
All times are Korea Standard Time (UTC+09:00)

Date	Time	Event
Tuesday, 1 October 2002	10:00	Pre-quarterfinals
Tuesday, 1 October 2002	13:00	Quarterfinals
Tuesday, 1 October 2002	16:00	Semifinals
Tuesday, 1 October 2002	19:00	Finals

== Results ==
Pre-quarterfinals
Yasin Merchant (IND); Rafat Habib (IND)	3
Mohsen Bukshaisha (QAT); Ahmed Al-Sada (QAT)	1
Randy Wong (BRU); Shari Hj Emran (BRU)	0
Ku Chih-wei (TPE); Lee Kun-fang (TPE)	3
Si Tou Chong Wut (MAC); Mok Sek Kei (MAC)	0
Mohammed Shehab (UAE); Mohammed Al-Jokar (UAE)	3
3	Saleh Mohammad (PAK); Naveen Perwani (PAK)	3
Ding Junhui (CHN); Jin Long (CHN)	1
Park Seung-chil (KOR); Lee Jae-ho (KOR)	2
Neang Tola (CAM); Chrin Sophanna (CAM)	3
Marco Fu (HKG); Au Chi Wai (HKG)	3
Keith E (SIN); Marvin Lim (SIN)	1
Marlon Manalo (PHI); Benjamin Guevarra (PHI)	3
2	Noppadol Sangnil (THA); Wanshana Poomjaeng (THA)	2

Quarterfinals
1	Sam Chong (MAS); Ng Ann Seng (MAS)	1
Yasin Merchant (IND); Rafat Habib (IND)	3
Ku Chih-wei (TPE); Lee Kun-fang (TPE)	3
Mohammed Shehab (UAE); Mohammed Al-Jokar (UAE)	2
3	Saleh Mohammad (PAK); Naveen Perwani (PAK)	3
Neang Tola (CAM); Chrin Sophanna (CAM)	1
Marco Fu (HKG); Au Chi Wai (HKG)	3
Marlon Manalo (PHI); Benjamin Guevarra (PHI)	0

Semifinals
Yasin Merchant (IND); Rafat Habib (IND)	3
Ku Chih-wei (TPE); Lee Kun-fang (TPE)	0
3	Saleh Mohammad (PAK); Naveen Perwani (PAK)	0
Marco Fu (HKG); Au Chi Wai (HKG)	3

Final
Yasin Merchant (IND); Rafat Habib (IND)	3
Marco Fu (HKG); Au Chi Wai (HKG)	1
3rd/4th place
Ku Chih-wei (TPE); Lee Kun-fang (TPE)	1
3	Saleh Mohammad (PAK); Naveen Perwani (PAK)	3
