= Cue sports at the 2002 Asian Games – Men's eight-ball singles =

Men's eight-ball singles at the 2002 Asian Games
- Venue: Dongju College Gymnasium
- Dates: 2–3 October 2002
- Competitors: 26 from 13 nations

Medalists
gold medal	Hsia Hui-kai	Chinese Taipei
silver medal	Huang Kun-chang	Chinese Taipei
bronze medal	Efren Reyes	Philippines

The men's eight-ball singles tournament at the 2002 Asian Games in Busan took place from 2 October to 3 October at Dongju College Gymnasium.

== Schedule ==
All times are Korea Standard Time (UTC+09:00)

Date	Time	Event
Wednesday, 2 October 2002	10:00	Preliminary 32
Wednesday, 2 October 2002	16:00	Pre-quarterfinals
Thursday, 3 October 2002	10:00	Quarterfinals
Thursday, 3 October 2002	13:00	Semifinals
Thursday, 3 October 2002	16:00	Finals

== Results ==
=== Finals ===
Final
1	Hsia Hui-kai (TPE)	9
	Huang Kun-chang (TPE)	5

3rd/4th place
4	Efren Reyes (PHI)	9
2	Tan Tiong Boon (SIN)	4

=== Top half ===
Preliminary 32
Muhamad Junarto (INA)	5
Tomoki Mekari (JPN)	9
Lee Yeol (KOR)	5
Mohammed Asim (IND)	9
Lim Tat Hwe (BRU)	0
Bernard Tey (SIN)	9
Zhang Kai (CHN)	5
Ibrahim Amir (MAS)	9
Khaled Al-Mutairi (KUW)	9
Mohammed Al-Binali (QAT)	2

Pre-quarterfinals
1	Hsia Hui-kai (TPE)	9
Tomoki Mekari (JPN)	7
Mohammed Asim (IND)	5
Worawit Suriyasriwan (THA)	9
Bernard Tey (SIN)	6
Ibrahim Amir (MAS)	9
Khaled Al-Mutairi (KUW)	1
4	Efren Reyes (PHI)	9

Quarterfinals
1	Hsia Hui-kai (TPE)	9
Worawit Suriyasriwan (THA)	4
Ibrahim Amir (MAS)	6
4	Efren Reyes (PHI)	9

Semifinals
1	Hsia Hui-kai (TPE)	9
4	Efren Reyes (PHI)	7

=== Bottom half ===
Preliminary 32
Tan Hsu Huei (BRU)	4
Siauw Wieto (INA)	9
Amnuayporn Chotipong (THA)	6
Huang Kun-chang (TPE)	9
Lee Vann Corteza (PHI)	7
Fu Jianbo (CHN)	9
Ryu Seung-woo (KOR)	9
Alan Tan (MAS)	6
Meshlesh Al-Khayarin (QAT)	5
Dharminder Lilly (IND)	9

Pre-quarterfinals
3	Kunihiko Takahashi (JPN)	7
Siauw Wieto (INA)	9
Huang Kun-chang (TPE)	9
Fu Jianbo (CHN)	5
Aref Al-Awadhi (KUW)	4
Ryu Seung-woo (KOR)	9
Dharminder Lilly (IND)	8
2	Tan Tiong Boon (SIN)	9

Quarterfinals
Siauw Wieto (INA)	5
Huang Kun-chang (TPE)	9
Ryu Seung-woo (KOR)	1
2	Tan Tiong Boon (SIN)	9

Semifinals
Huang Kun-chang (TPE)	9
2	Tan Tiong Boon (SIN)	4
