= ACBS Asian Snooker Championship =

The ACBS Asian Snooker Championship is the premier non-professional snooker tournament in Asia. The event series is sanctioned by the Asian Confederation of Billiard Sports and started from 1984.

== Winners ==
=== Men's ===
Year	Venue	Winner	Runner-up	Score
1984	Thailand	(Thailand) Sakchai Sim Ngam	(Thailand) Vichien Sangthong	8–5
1985	Singapore	(Hong Kong) Gary Kwok	(Thailand) Sakchai Sim Ngam	8–5
1986	Sri Lanka	(Thailand) James Wattana	(Hong Kong) Gary Kwok	8–1
1987	Malaysia	(Thailand) Udon Khaimuk	(Thailand) James Wattana	8–6
1988	Sri Lanka	(Thailand) James Wattana	(Hong Kong) Kenny Kwok	8–1
1989	India	(India) Yasin Merchant	(Thailand) Udon Khaimuk	8–6
1990	Indonesia	(Malaysia) Sam Chong	(Hong Kong) Stanley Leung	8–1
1991	Pakistan	(Thailand) Chuchart Triritanapradit	(India) Yasin Merchant	8–3
1992	Thailand	(Thailand) Praput Chaithanasakul	(Thailand) Chuchart Triritanapradit	8–7
1993	China	(Thailand) Praput Chaithanasakul	(Thailand) Chuchart Triritanapradit	8–5
1994	Bangladesh	(Malaysia) Ooi Chin Kay	(Thailand) Samporn Kanthawung	8–7
1995	Thailand	(Thailand) Anurat Wongjan	(Thailand) Thephachai Woratraiphob	8–7
1996	China	(Thailand) Anan Terananon	(Thailand) Amnuayorn Chotipong	8–5
1997	United Arab Emirates	(Thailand) Anurat Wongjan	(Philippines) Marlon Manalo	8–6
1998	Pakistan	(Pakistan) Muhammad Yousaf	(Thailand) Phirom Ritthiprasong	8–7
1999	Thailand	(Thailand) Noppadon Noppachorn	(Malaysia) Sam Chong	8–4
2000	Hong Kong	(Philippines) Marlon Manalo	(Thailand) Noppadol Sangnil	8–6
2001	Pakistan	(India) Yasin Merchant	(China) Jin Long	8–4
2002	China	(China) Ding Junhui	(Singapore) Keith E. Boon	8–1
2004	Aqaba, Jordan	(India) Alok Kumar	(India) Pankaj Advani	6–3
2005	Thailand	(China) Jin Long	(China) Cai Jianzhong	6–4
2006	Colombo, Sri Lanka	(Thailand) Issara Kachaiwong	(United Arab Emirates) Mohammed Shehab	6–3
2007	Karachi, Pakistan	(Thailand) Supoj Saenla	(India) Yasin Merchant	7–0
2008	Dubai, United Arab Emirates	(China) Jin Long	(India) Aditya Mehta	7–3
2009	Tangshan, China	(Thailand) James Wattana	(China) Mei Xiwen	7–3
2010	Chanthaburi, Thailand	(Thailand) Issara Kachaiwong	(Pakistan) Muhammad Sajjad	7–3
2011	Indore, India	(Thailand) Passakorn Suwannawat	(India) Aditya Mehta	6–2
2012	Doha, Qatar	(India) Aditya Mehta	(India) Pankaj Advani	7–5
2013	Karachi, Pakistan	(Afghanistan) Saleh Mohammad	(Syria) Omar Al Kojah	7–2
2014	Al Fujairah, United Arab Emirates	(Malaysia) Thor Chuan Leong	(Taiwan) Hung Chuang Ming	7–3
2015	Kuala Lumpur, Malaysia	(Pakistan) Hamza Akbar	(India) Pankaj Advani	7–6
2016	Doha, Qatar	(Thailand) Kritsanut Lertsattayathorn	(United Arab Emirates) Mohamed Shehab	6–2
2017	Doha, Qatar	(China) Lyu Haotian	(India) Pankaj Advani	6–3
2018	Tabriz, Iran	(Iran) Amir Sarkhosh	(Iran) Ali Ghareghouzlo	6–1
2019	Doha, Qatar	(India) Pankaj Advani	(Thailand) Thanawat Thirapongpaiboon	6–3
2021	Doha, Qatar	(India) Pankaj Advani	(Iran) Amir Sarkhosh	6–3
2022	Doha, Qatar	(Iran) Amir Sarkhosh	(India) Ishpreet Singh Chadha	5–0
2023	Doha, Qatar	(Iran) Amir Sarkhosh	(Malaysia) Thor Chuan Leong	5–1
2024	Doha, Qatar	(Iran) Ali Gharahgozlou	(Pakistan) Awais Munir	5–2
2025	Doha, Qatar	(India) Pankaj Advani	(Iran) Amir Sarkhosh	4–1
2026	Doha, Qatar	(China) Deng Haohui	(India) Pankaj Advani	4–1

=== Women's ===
Year	Venue	Winner	Runner-up	Score
2017	Chandigarh, India	(Hong Kong) Ng On Yee	(Thailand) Waratthanun Sukritthanes	3–2
2018	Yangon, Myanmar	(India) Amee Kamani	(Thailand) Siripaporn Nuanthakhamjan	3–0
2019	Chandigarh, India	(Hong Kong) Ng On Yee	(China) Bai Yulu	3–2
2022	Doha, Qatar	(Thailand) Siripaporn Nuanthakhamjan	(Thailand) Nutcharut Wongharuthai	3–2
2023	Doha, Qatar	(China) Bai Yulu	(Thailand) Panchaya Channoi	3–0
2024	Riyadh, Saudi Arabia	(India) Anupama Ramachandran	(Thailand) Panchaya Channoi	3–1
2025	Doha, Qatar	(Mongolia) Narantuya Bayarsaikhan	(Hong Kong) Ng On Yee	3–0
2026	Doha, Qatar	(Mongolia) Narantuya Bayarsaikhan	(India) Keerthana Pandian	3–1

== Winners (6Reds & Team Snooker) ==
ACBS Asian 6 Reds Snooker Championship: Indian Pankaj Advani claimed the 5th edition ACBS Asian 6 Reds Snooker Championship on in Abu Dhabi.

1- 2012

2- 2013 - Doha - Qatar

3- 2014 - Karachi - Pakistan 3rd Snooker 6-Red and 2nd Snooker Team Championships

4- 2015 - Kish Island - Iran

5- 2016 - Abu Dhabi - UAE

6- 2017 - Bishkek - Kyrgyzstan

7- 2018 - Doha - Qatar

8- 2019 - Doha - Qatar

== Billiards Sports ==
1st Asian Billiards Sport 2016 was held in 24 September - 2 October 2016 - Al Fujairah - UAE.

== 100 up Billiard ==
17th Asian 100 up Billiards Championship → Yangon - Myanmar 2018

== English Billiards Championships ==
=== Hosts ===
Year	Venue	Winner	Runner-up	Score
2001	Thailand			
2002	India			
2004	Malaysia			
2005	Thailand			
2006	Iran			
2007	Doha, Qatar			
2008	Yangon, Myanmar			
2009	Pune, India			
2010	Indore, India			
2011	Kish, Iran	(India) Alok Kumar	(Thailand) Praput Chaithanasukan	6–0
2012	Goa, India	(India) Pankaj Advani	(Thailand) Thawat Sujaritthurakarn	6–3
2013	Indore, India			
2014	Chandigarh, India			
2015	Beijing, China			
2016	Colombo, Sri Lanka			
2017	Chandigarh, India			
2018	Yangon, Myanmar			
2019	Chandigarh, India			

== ACBS Asian Tour 10 RED ==
1st ACBS ASIAN TOUR 10 RED : Doha - Qatar 2018

2nd ACBS ASIAN TOUR 10 RED : Jinan – China 2018

== Stats ==
=== Champions by country (Men's) ===
Rank	Nation	Gold	Silver	Bronze	Total
1	Thailand (THA)	17	12	10	39
2	India (IND)	14	8	7	29
3	Pakistan (PAK)	9	3	6	18
4	China (CHN)	4	4	5	13
5	Iran (IRI)	3	2	5	10
6	Malaysia (MAS)	3	0	2	5
7	Hong Kong (HKG)	1	3	5	9
8	Philippines (PHI)	1	1	1	3
9	Afghanistan (AFG)	1	0	3	4
10	United Arab Emirates (UAE)	0	2	1	3
11	Singapore (SGP)	0	1	1	2
12	Chinese Taipei (TPE)	0	1	0	1
12	Syria (SYR)	0	1	0	1
14	Sri Lanka (SRI)	0	0	2	2
15	Bahrain (BHR)	0	0	1	1
Totals (15 entries)		53	38	49	140

=== Champions by country (Women's) ===
Rank	Nation	Gold	Silver	Bronze	Total
1	Hong Kong (HKG)	2	0	1	3
2	Thailand (THA)	1	3	0	4
3	India (IND)	1	0	6	7
4	China (CHN)	0	1	0	1
5	Mongolia (MGL)	0	0	1	1
Totals (5 entries)		4	4	8	16

== See also ==
- World Snooker Tour
- IBSF World Billiards Championship
- World Billiards Championship (English billiards)
- Cue sports at the Asian Games
