= Au Chi-wai =

Hong Kong snooker and pool player

Personal information
- Born: November 19, 1969 (age 56) Hong Kong

Sport
- Country: Hong Kong
- Sport: Snooker

Medal record

Men's snooker

Representing Hong Kong

Asian Games
| Silver medal – second place | 2002 Busan | Doubles |

Asian Championship
| Bronze medal – third place | 2009 Tangshan | Singles |

Au Chi-wai
- Traditional Chinese: 區志偉
- Simplified Chinese: 区志伟
Transcriptions
Standard Mandarin
- Hanyu Pinyin: Ōu Zhìwěi
Yue: Cantonese
- Jyutping: Au^{1} Zi^{3} Wai^{5}
- IPA: [ɐw˥ tsi˧.wɐj˩˧]

Au Chi-wai (Chinese: 區志偉; born 19 November 1969), sometimes referred to as Au Chi Wai or Chi-wai Au in Western media), is an amateur snooker and pool player from Hong Kong. In snooker, he won (with Marco Fu), the silver medal in the snooker doubles event at the 2002 Asian Games in Busan. Au was also the second runner-up in the 2009 Asian Snooker Championships. In pool, he was the first runner-up in the 2006 Asian 9-Ball Challenge, in Bangkok, on the WPA Asian 9-Ball Tour.

Au's highest snooker break in competition is 147.

== Performance and rankings timeline ==
| Tournament | 1997/ 98 | 2004/ 05 | 2008/ 09 | 2009/ 10 | 2012/ 13 | 2013/ 14 | 2014/ 15 | 2015/ 16 | 2019/ 20 |
|---|---|---|---|---|---|---|---|---|---|
| Ranking (Note: From the 2010/2011 season it shows the ranking at the beginning of the season) | (Note: He was an amateur) | | | | | | | | |
Ranking tournaments
| Players Tour Championship Final | Tournament Not Held | | | | DNQ | DNQ | DNQ | DNQ | DNQ |
| World Championship | LQ | A | A | A | A | A | A | A | A |
Non-ranking tournaments
| Six-red World Championship (Note: The event was called the Six-red International (2008/2009) and the Six-red World Grand Prix (2009/2010)) | Not Held | | RR | RR | A | A | A | A | A |
| World Seniors Championship | Tournament Not Held | | | | A | A | A | A | 2R |
Former ranking tournaments
| China Open (Note: The event was called the China International (1997/1998)) | A | A | A | WR | A | A | A | A | NH |
Former ranking tournaments
| General Cup (Note: The event was called the General Cup International (2004/2005–2011/2012)) | NH | RR | NH | A | A | A | A | A | NH |

Performance table legend
| LQ | lost in the qualifying draw | #R | lost in the early rounds of the tournament (WR = Wildcard round, RR = Round robin) | QF | lost in the quarter-finals |
| SF | lost in the semi–finals | F | lost in the final | W | won the tournament |
| DNQ | did not qualify for the tournament | A | did not participate in the tournament | WD | withdrew from the tournament |

| NH / Not Held | means an event was not held. |
| NR / Non-Ranking Event | means an event is/was no longer a ranking event. |
| R / Ranking Event | means an event is/was a ranking event. |
| MR / Minor-Ranking Event | means an event is/was a minor-ranking event. |

== Top finishes ==
- First runner-up - 2002 East Asian Games - Busan (doubles, with Marco Fu)
- First runner-up - 2006 Asian Snooker Challenge (team)
- First runner-up - 2009 Asian 9-Ball Challenge (Bangkok)
- First runner-up - 2004 Asian Snooker Challenge (team)
- Second runner-up - 2009 Asian Snooker Championship
