= Rowing at the 2002 Asian Games – Men's coxless four =

Men's coxless four at the 2002 Asian Games
- Venue: Nakdong River
- Date: 2 October 2002
- Competitors: 24 from 6 nations

Medalists
gold medal	China; Sun Jian, Chen Zheng, Wang Bo, Chi Huanqi
silver medal	Uzbekistan; Nasrullo Nazarov, Bahadir Davletyarov, Vladimir Tremasov, Ruslan Bichurin
bronze medal	India; Jenil Krishnan, Inderpal Singh, Roshan Lal, Paulose Pandari Kunnel

The men's coxless four competition at the 2002 Asian Games in Busan was held on 2 October 2002 at the Nakdong River.

== Schedule ==
All times are Korea Standard Time (UTC+09:00)

Date	Time	Event
Wednesday, 2 October 2002	11:15	Final

== Results ==
Rank	Team	Time
1st place, gold medalist(s)	China (CHN); Sun Jian; Chen Zheng; Wang Bo; Chi Huanqi	6:46.25
2nd place, silver medalist(s)	Uzbekistan (UZB); Nasrullo Nazarov; Bahadir Davletyarov; Vladimir Tremasov; Ruslan Bichurin	6:58.79
3rd place, bronze medalist(s)	India (IND); Jenil Krishnan; Inderpal Singh; Roshan Lal; Paulose Pandari Kunnel	7:02.91
4	South Korea (KOR); Kim Jeung-wook; Woo Jae-moon; Im Won-hyuk; Lee Seung-hwan	7:06.53
5	Chinese Taipei (TPE); Wu Chi-hsiu; Kung Tai-yuan; Hsu Wei-chieh; Kao Kun-cheng	7:14.84
6	Pakistan (PAK); Allah Rakha; Romay Khan; Naseer Ahmed Tahir; Muhammad Adeel Sultan	7:26.22
