= Cue sports at the 2002 Asian Games – Men's English billiards doubles =

Men's English billiards doubles at the 2002 Asian Games
- Venue: Dongju College Gymnasium
- Dates: 6 October 2002
- Competitors: 16 from 8 nations

Medalists
gold medal	Praprut Chaithanasakun; Mongkhon Kanfaklang	Thailand
silver medal	Geet Sethi; Alok Kumar	India
bronze medal	Kyaw Oo; Aung San Oo	Myanmar

The men's English billiards doubles tournament at the 2002 Asian Games in Busan took place on 6 October 2002 at Dongju College Gymnasium.

== Schedule ==
All times are Korea Standard Time (UTC+09:00)

Date	Time	Event
Sunday, 6 October 2002	10:00	Quarterfinals
Sunday, 6 October 2002	13:00	Semifinals
Sunday, 6 October 2002	16:00	Finals

== Results ==
Quarterfinals
1	Geet Sethi (IND); Alok Kumar (IND)	2
Nguyễn Thanh Long (VIE); Nguyễn Trung Kiên (VIE)	0
Henry Boteju (SRI); Khobala Sirisoma (SRI)	1
Kyaw Oo (MYA); Aung San Oo (MYA)	2
Park Seung-chil (KOR); Lee Wan-soo (KOR)	0
Muhammad Hussain Khalil (PAK); Muhammad Yousaf (PAK)	2
Moh Loon Hong (MAS); Simon Sim (MAS)	0
2	Praprut Chaithanasakun (THA); Mongkhon Kanfaklang (THA)	2

Semifinals
1	Geet Sethi (IND); Alok Kumar (IND)	2
Kyaw Oo (MYA); Aung San Oo (MYA)	1
Muhammad Hussain Khalil (PAK); Muhammad Yousaf (PAK)	0
2	Praprut Chaithanasakun (THA); Mongkhon Kanfaklang (THA)	2

Final
1	Geet Sethi (IND); Alok Kumar (IND)	1
2	Praprut Chaithanasakun (THA); Mongkhon Kanfaklang (THA)	2
3rd/4th place
Kyaw Oo (MYA); Aung San Oo (MYA)	2
Muhammad Hussain Khalil (PAK); Muhammad Yousaf (PAK)	0
