= Cue sports at the 2002 Asian Games – Men's English billiards singles =

Men's English billiards singles at the 2002 Asian Games
- Venue: Dongju College Gymnasium
- Dates: 7–8 October 2002
- Competitors: 16 from 8 nations

Medalists
| gold medal | Praprut Chaithanasakun | Thailand |
| silver medal | Kyaw Oo | Myanmar |
| bronze medal | Geet Sethi | India |

The men's English billiards singles tournament at the 2002 Asian Games in Busan took place from 7 October to 8 October at Dongju College Gymnasium.

The players were seeded based on their final ranking at the same event at the 1998 Asian Games in Bangkok. Praprut Chaithanasakun of Thailand won the gold after beating Kyaw Oo of Myanmar in the final.

== Schedule ==
All times are Korea Standard Time (UTC+09:00)

| Date | Time | Event |
|---|---|---|
| Monday, 7 October 2002 | 13:00 | Pre-quarterfinals |
| Monday, 7 October 2002 | 16:00 | Quarterfinals |
| Monday, 7 October 2002 | 19:00 | Semifinals |
| Tuesday, 8 October 2002 | 10:00 | Finals |

== Results ==
Pre-quarterfinals
1 | Geet Sethi (IND) | 2
Muhammad Hussain Khalil (PAK) | 0
Udon Khaimuk (THA) | 2
Nguyễn Thanh Long (VIE) | 1
Henry Boteju (SRI) | 0
Kyaw Oo (MYA) | 2
Park Seung-chil (KOR) | 0
Moh Loon Hong (MAS) | 2
3 | Praprut Chaithanasakun (THA) | 2
Lee Wan-soo (KOR) | 0
Nguyễn Trung Kiên (VIE) | 1
Simon Sim (MAS) | 2
Muhammad Yousaf (PAK) | 0
Aung San Oo (MYA) | 2
Khobala Sirisoma (SRI) | 1
2 | Devendra Joshi (IND) | 2

Quarterfinals
1 | Geet Sethi (IND) | 2
Udon Khaimuk (THA) | 1
Kyaw Oo (MYA) | 2
Moh Loon Hong (MAS) | 0
3 | Praprut Chaithanasakun (THA) | 2
Simon Sim (MAS) | 0
Aung San Oo (MYA) | 2
2 | Devendra Joshi (IND) | 0

Semifinals
1 | Geet Sethi (IND) | 1
Kyaw Oo (MYA) | 2
3 | Praprut Chaithanasakun (THA) | 2
Aung San Oo (MYA) | 0

Final
Kyaw Oo (MYA) | 0
3 | Praprut Chaithanasakun (THA) | 2
3rd/4th place
1 | Geet Sethi (IND) | 2
Aung San Oo (MYA) | 0
