= Cue sports at the 2002 Asian Games – Men's straight rail singles =

Men's straight rail singles at the 2002 Asian Games
- Venue: Dongju College Gymnasium
- Dates: 2–4 October 2002
- Competitors: 13 from 8 nations

Medalists
gold medal	Trần Đình Hòa	Vietnam
silver medal	Dương Hoàng Anh	Vietnam
bronze medal	Nobuaki Kobayashi	Japan

The men's Straight rail (as partie libre) singles tournament at the 2002 Asian Games in Busan took place from 2 October to 4 October at Dongju College Gymnasium.

== Schedule ==
All times are Korea Standard Time (UTC+09:00)

Date	Time	Event
Wednesday, 2 October 2002	13:00	Pre-quarterfinals
Thursday, 3 October 2002	10:00	Quarterfinals
Thursday, 3 October 2002	19:00	Semifinals
Friday, 4 October 2002	13:00	Finals

== Results ==
Legend

- WO — Won by walkover

Pre-quarterfinals
Trần Đình Hòa (VIE)	400
Ananta Sigit Sidharta (INA)	254
Moh Loon Hong (MAS)	77
Udon Khaimuk (THA)	88
Siddharth Anand (IND)	40
Kim Jung-kyoum (KOR)	359
Dương Hoàng Anh (VIE)	83
Mongkhon Kanfaklang (THA)	48
Kim Hyo-soo (KOR)	202
Nobuaki Kobayashi (JPN)	351

Quarterfinals
Tadashi Machida (JPN)	41
Trần Đình Hòa (VIE)	400
Udon Khaimuk (THA)	86
Kim Jung-kyoum (KOR)	127
Reynaldo Grandea (PHI)	205
Dương Hoàng Anh (VIE)	215
Nobuaki Kobayashi (JPN)	WO
Simon Sim (MAS)

Semifinals
Trần Đình Hòa (VIE)	371
Kim Jung-kyoum (KOR)	344
Dương Hoàng Anh (VIE)	400
Nobuaki Kobayashi (JPN)	204

Final
Trần Đình Hòa (VIE)	400
Dương Hoàng Anh (VIE)	142
3rd/4th place
Kim Jung-kyoum (KOR)	149
Nobuaki Kobayashi (JPN)	400
