= Athletics at the 2002 Asian Games – Men's shot put =

Men's shot put at the 2002 Asian Games
- Venue: Busan Asiad Main Stadium
- Date: 8 October 2002
- Competitors: 9 from 6 nations

Medalists
gold medal	Bahadur Singh Sagoo	India
silver medal	Bilal Saad Mubarak	Qatar
bronze medal	Shakti Singh	India

The men's shot put competition at the 2002 Asian Games in Busan, South Korea was held on 8 October at the Busan Asiad Main Stadium.

== Schedule ==
All times are Korea Standard Time (UTC+09:00)

Date	Time	Event
Tuesday, 8 October 2002	12:00	Final

== Records ==
Prior to this competition, the existing world, Asian and Games records were as follows.

World Record	Randy Barnes (USA)	23.12	Los Angeles, United States	20 May 1990
Asian Record	Sergey Rubtsov (KAZ)	20.45	Almaty, Kazakhstan	15 June 1996
Games Record	Liu Hao (CHN)	19.26	Hiroshima, Japan	14 October 1994

== Results ==
Rank	Athlete	Attempt						Result	Notes
Rank	Athlete	1	2	3	4	5	6	Result	Notes
1st place, gold medalist(s)	Bahadur Singh Sagoo (IND)	X	19.03	X	X	X	X	19.03	
2nd place, silver medalist(s)	Bilal Saad Mubarak (QAT)	18.98	X	18.86	X	18.75	18.86	18.98	
3rd place, bronze medalist(s)	Shakti Singh (IND)	17.49	X	X	X	18.27	18.16	18.27	
4	Ahmad Gholoum (KUW)	X	18.05	17.97	X	18.27	17.84	18.27	
5	Kim Jae-il (KOR)	17.80	17.66	X	17.15	18.16	X	18.16	
6	Sultan Al-Hebshi (KSA)	16.28	16.54	X	X	17.05	16.97	17.05	
7	Satoshi Hatase (JPN)	16.79	16.09	16.26	15.88	16.10	16.34	16.79	
8	Amin Al-Aradi (KSA)	14.82	16.19	16.28	16.35	X	15.92	16.35	
9	Ibrahim Al-Mannai (QAT)	X	15.91	15.97				15.97	
