= Cue sports at the 2002 Asian Games – Men's three-cushion singles =

Men's three-cushion singles at the 2002 Asian Games
- Venue: Dongju College Gymnasium
- Dates: 5–7 October 2002
- Competitors: 15 from 8 nations

Medalists
gold medal	Hwang Deuk-hee	South Korea
silver medal	Lee Sang-chun	South Korea
bronze medal	Akio Shimada	Japan

The men's three-cushion billiards singles tournament at the 2002 Asian Games in Busan took place from 5 October to 7 October at Dongju College Gymnasium.

The players were seeded based on their final ranking at the same event at the 1998 Asian Games in Bangkok. Hwang Deuk-hee of Korea won the gold after beating his compatriot Lee Sang-chun in the final.

== Schedule ==
All times are Korea Standard Time (UTC+09:00)

Date	Time	Event
Saturday, 5 October 2002	10:00	Pre-quarterfinals
Sunday, 6 October 2002	10:00	Quarterfinals
Sunday, 6 October 2002	16:00	Semifinals
Monday, 7 October 2002	16:00	Finals

== Results ==
Pre-quarterfinals
Worawit Suriyasriwan (THA)	16
Lý Thế Vinh (VIE)	50
Yang Yao-huei (TPE)	34
Efren Reyes (PHI)	50
Moh Loon Hong (MAS)	16
4	Hwang Deuk-hee (KOR)	50
3	Lee Sang-chun (KOR)	50
Đặng Đình Tiến (VIE)	30
Patrick Ooi (MAS)	36
Siddharth Anand (IND)	21
Amnuayporn Chotipong (THA)	17
Reynaldo Grandea (PHI)	50
Yuan Yung-kuo (TPE)	50
2	Akira Hida (JPN)	33

Quarterfinals
1	Akio Shimada (JPN)	50
Lý Thế Vinh (VIE)	32
Efren Reyes (PHI)	33
4	Hwang Deuk-hee (KOR)	50
3	Lee Sang-chun (KOR)	50
Patrick Ooi (MAS)	16
Reynaldo Grandea (PHI)	50
Yuan Yung-kuo (TPE)	49

Semifinals
1	Akio Shimada (JPN)	29
4	Hwang Deuk-hee (KOR)	50
3	Lee Sang-chun (KOR)	50
Reynaldo Grandea (PHI)	17

Final
4	Hwang Deuk-hee (KOR)	50
3	Lee Sang-chun (KOR)	24
3rd/4th place
1	Akio Shimada (JPN)	50
Reynaldo Grandea (PHI)	21
