= 2017 ACBS Asian Snooker Championship =

ACBS Asian Snooker Championship
Tournament information
- Dates: 22–28 April 2017
- City: Doha
- Country: Qatar
- Organisation: ACBS
- Highest break: (China) Li Yuan (129)

Final
- Champion: (China) Lyu Haotian
- Runner-up: (India) Pankaj Advani
- Score: 6–3

The 2017 ACBS Asian Snooker Championship was an amateur snooker tournament that took place from 22 April to 28 April 2017 in Doha, Qatar. It was the 33rd edition of the ACBS Asian Snooker Championship and also doubles as a qualification event for the World Snooker Tour.

The tournament was won by the number 2 seed Lyu Haotian of China who defeated Pankaj Advani 6–3 in the final to win the championship, as a result Lyu was given a two-year card on the professional World Snooker Tour for the 2017/2018 and 2018/2019 seasons.

== Results ==
Round 1 Best of 7 frames
1	(India) Pankaj Advani	4
32	(Chinese Taipei) Shu Hung Lin	0
17	(Syria) Abdulkarim Maksoud	1
16	(Iran) Ali Roshanikiya	4
9	(Bahrain) Habib Subah	2
24	(Myanmar) Aung Phyo	4
25	(United Arab Emirates) Mohammed Al Joaker	4
8	(Iran) Amir Sarkhosh	3
5	(Thailand) Issara Kachaiwong	3
28	(Iran) Hamed Zarehdoost	4
21	(United Arab Emirates) Eissa Ali Al Hashmi	0
12	(Malaysia) Mohd Reza Hassan	4
13	(Thailand) Thanawat Tirapongpaiboon	2
20	(Pakistan) Mohammad Bilal	4
29	(Pakistan) Asjad Iqbal	4
4	(China) Li Yuan	1
3	(India) Dharminder Lilly	4
30	(Myanmar) Maung Maung	3
19	(Qatar) Ahmed Saif	1
14	(United Arab Emirates) Mohamed Shehab	4
11	(Malaysia) Patrick Ooi	4
22	(Myanmar) Ko Htet	3
27	(Qatar) Ali Alobaidli	2
6	(Hong Kong) Ka Wai Cheung	4
7	(Saudi Arabia) Omar Alajlani	1
26	(Iraq) Omar Ali	4
23	(Malaysia) Moh Keen Hoo	4
10	(Hong Kong) Lee Chun Wai	1
15	(Afghanistan) Mohammad Rais Senzahi	4
18	(Pakistan) Muhammad Sajjad	3
31	(South Korea) Daegyu Lee	0
2	(China) Lyu Haotian	4

Round 2 Best of 7 frames
1	(India) Pankaj Advani	4
16	(Iran) Ali Roshanikiya	3
24	(Myanmar) Aung Phyo	3
25	(United Arab Emirates) Mohammed Al Joaker	4
28	(Iran) Hamed Zarehdoost	1
12	(Malaysia) Mohd Reza Hassan	4
20	(Pakistan) Mohammad Bilal	4
29	(Pakistan) Asjad Iqbal	3
3	(India) Dharminder Lilly	1
14	(United Arab Emirates) Mohamed Shehab	4
11	(Malaysia) Patrick Ooi	4
6	(Hong Kong) Ka Wai Cheung	2
26	(Iraq) Omar Ali	2
23	(Malaysia) Moh Keen Hoo	4
15	(Afghanistan) Mohammad Rais Senzahi	1
2	(China) Lyu Haotian	4

Quarter-Finals; Best of 9 frames
1	(India) Pankaj Advani	5
25	(United Arab Emirates) Mohammed Al Joaker	1
12	(Malaysia) Mohd Reza Hassan	2
20	(Pakistan) Mohammad Bilal	5
14	(United Arab Emirates) Mohamed Shehab	5
11	(Malaysia) Patrick Ooi	4
23	(Malaysia) Moh Keen Hoo	4
2	(China) Lyu Haotian	5

Semi-Finals; Best of 9 frames
1	(India) Pankaj Advani	5
20	(Pakistan) Mohammad Bilal	0
14	(United Arab Emirates) Mohamed Shehab	3
2	(China) Lyu Haotian	5

Final; Best of 11 frames
1	(India) Pankaj Advani	3
2	(China) Lyu Haotian	6
