= Cue sports at the 1998 Asian Games – Men's three-cushion singles =

Men's three-cushion singles at the 1998 Asian Games
- Venue: Land Sports Complex
- Dates: 7–9 December 1998
- Competitors: 14 from 8 nations

Medalists
| gold medal | Akio Shimada | Japan |
| silver medal | Ryuji Umeda | Japan |
| bronze medal | Kim Jung-gyu | South Korea |

The men's three-cushion billiards singles tournament at the 1998 Asian Games in Thailand took place from 7 December to 9 December at Land Sports Complex.

Akio Shimada of Japan won the gold after beating his compatriot Ryuji Umeda in the final.

== Schedule ==
All times are Indochina Time (UTC+07:00)

| Date | Time | Event |
|---|---|---|
| Monday, 7 December 1998 | 10:00 | First round |
| Tuesday, 8 December 1998 | 10:00 | Quarterfinals |
| Wednesday, 9 December 1998 | 10:00 | Semifinals |
| Wednesday, 9 December 1998 | 16:00 | Finals |

== Results ==
First round
Ewin Lean (MAS) | 19
Jira Jaidee (THA) | 27
Mukesh Rehani (IND) | 25
Yang Yao-huei (TPE) | 27
Lý Thế Vinh (VIE) | 45
Kim Jung-gyu (KOR) | 50
Suriya Suwannasingh (THA) | 25
Moh Loon Hong (MAS) | 14
Geet Sethi (IND) | 23
Reynaldo Grandea (PHI) | 50
Lin Sheng-yung (TPE) | 30
Ryuji Umeda (JPN) | 50

Quarterfinals
Akio Shimada (JPN) | 50
Jira Jaidee (THA) | 28
Yang Yao-huei (TPE) | 27
Kim Jung-gyu (KOR) | 50
Kim Moo-soon (KOR) | 50
Suriya Suwannasingh (THA) | 35
Reynaldo Grandea (PHI) | 38
Ryuji Umeda (JPN) | 50

Semifinals
Akio Shimada (JPN) | 50
Kim Jung-gyu (KOR) | 37
Kim Moo-soon (KOR) | 47
Ryuji Umeda (JPN) | 50

Final
Akio Shimada (JPN) | 50
Ryuji Umeda (JPN) | 40
3rd place match
Kim Jung-gyu (KOR) | 50
Kim Moo-soon (KOR) | 32
