= Pakistan at the Asian Games =

- IOC code: PAK
- NOC: Pakistan Olympic Association
- Medals Ranked 18th: Gold 44 Silver 66 Bronze 107 Total 217

Summer appearances
- 1954; 1958; 1962; 1966; 1970; 1974; 1978; 1982; 1986; 1990; 1994; 1998; 2002; 2006; 2010; 2014; 2018; 2022; 2026

Winter appearances
- 1996; 1999; 2003; 2007; 2011; 2017; 2025; 2029

Pakistan is a member of the South Asian Zone of the Olympic Council of Asia (OCA), and has participated in the Asian Games since their second edition in 1954. The Pakistan Olympic Association, established in 1948, and recognised in the same year by the International Olympic Committee, is the National Olympic Committee for Pakistan.

Pakistan was one of the first five founding members of the Asian Games Federation on 13 February 1949, in New Delhi, the organisation which was disbanded on 26 November 1981, and replaced by the Olympic Council of Asia.

== Membership of Olympic Council of Asia ==
Pakistan is a member of the South Asian Zone of the Olympic Council of Asia, the governing body of all the sports in Asia, recognised by the International Olympic Committee as the continental association of Asia.^{[a]} Being a member of South Asian Zone, Pakistan also participates in the South Asian Games, sub-regional Games for South Asia.

The OCA organises five major continental-level multi-sport events: the Asian Summer Games (which are commonly known as the Asian Games), Asian Winter Games, Asian Indoor-Martial Arts Games, Asian Beach Games, and Asian Youth Games. Before 2009, Indoor and Martial Arts were two separate events, specialised for indoor and martial arts sports respectively. However, the OCA has since amalgamated them into a single event, Asian Indoor and Martial Arts Games, which will be debuted in 2013 in Incheon, South Korea. As a member of OCA, Pakistan is privileged to participate in all these multi-sport events.

== Summer Games results ==
Pakistan has been a regular participant in the Asian Games, having competed in every edition since their inception in 1951, with the exception of the inaugural Games held in New Delhi, which it declined to attend due to the Kashmir conflict with India. The country's finest performance came at the 1962 Jakarta Asian Games, where Pakistan secured 8 gold, 11 silver, and 9 bronze medals, finishing fourth overall in the medal standings. As of the 2026 Asian Games, Pakistan's medal tally is largely dominated by a few key sports, with Boxing contributing the highest number of medals at 61, followed by Athletics with 40, Wrestling with 34, Field hockey with 15, Squash with 12, Sailing with 10, and Kabaddi with 9.

Peach colour indicates best performance

Year	Gold	Silver	Bronze	Total	Rank
1951 New Delhi (India)	did not participate				
1954 Manila (Philippines)	5	6	2	13	4
1958 Tokyo (Japan)	6	11	9	26	6
1962 Jakarta (Indonesia)	8	11	9	28	4
1966 Bangkok (Thailand)	2	4	2	8	11
1970 Bangkok (Thailand)	1	2	7	10	13
1974 Tehran (Iran)	2	0	9	11	11
1978 Bangkok (Thailand)	4	4	9	17	8
1982 New Delhi (India)	3	3	5	11	8
1986 Seoul (South Korea)	2	3	4	9	8
1990 Beijing (China)	4	1	7	12	6
1994 Hiroshima (Japan)	0	4	6	10	22
1998 Bangkok (Thailand)	2	4	9	15	16
2002 Busan (South Korea)	1	6	6	13	22
2006 Doha (Qatar)	0	1	3	4	31
2010 Guangzhou (China)	3	2	3	8	20
2014 Incheon (South Korea)	1	1	3	5	23
2018 Jakarta / Palembang (Indonesia)	0	0	4	4	34
2022 Hangzhou (China)	0	1	2	3	31
2026 Aichi-Nagoya (Japan)	0	2	8	10	29
2030 Doha (Qatar)	future event				
2034 Riyadh (Saudi Arabia)	future event				
Total	44	66	107	217	18

- Gold
- Silver
- Bronze

=== Asian Games Medals by sport ===
Sport	Gold	Silver	Bronze	Total	Rank
Athletics	14	13	13	40	9
Field hockey	8	3	4	15	2
Boxing	6	19	36	61	10
Wrestling	6	14	14	34	10
Sailing	5	3	2	10	8
Squash	2	5	5	12	4
Cricket	2	1	2	5	2
Cue sports	1	0	5	6	11
Kabaddi	0	2	7	9	4
Cycling	0	2	1	3	15
Weightlifting	0	1	3	4	23
Tennis	0	1	2	3	15
Wushu	0	1	2	3	19
Equestrian	0	1	0	1	15
Rowing	0	0	3	3	15
Shooting	0	0	2	2	27
Volleyball	0	0	2	2	8
Badminton	0	0	1	1	11
Esports	0	0	1	1	15
Karate	0	0	1	1	27
Mixed martial arts	0	0	1	1	9
Total	44	66	107	217	18

== Winter Games results ==
Pakistan has never won a medal in the Asian Winter Games. Pakistan's winter sports history began with representation at the 3rd and 4th Asian Winter Games in 1996 and 1999. The 2017 Asian Winter Games marked a significant milestone as Pakistan fielded its first-ever female athletes in the event, with a delegation of 12 athletes (8 men and 4 women) competing in alpine skiing and cross-country skiing.

== Para Games results ==
Pakistan has competed in the Asian Para Games since their inception in 2010, achieving a total of 10 medals (5 gold, 2 silver, 3 bronze) across four editions, placing them 22nd on the all-time medal table. At the inaugural 2010 Games in Guangzhou, Pakistan finished 13th with four medals, including two golds. Pakistan secured a single bronze medal at the 2014 Incheon Games, awarded to Muhammad Awais in the men's javelin throw. At the 2018 Jakarta Games, Pakistan won 3 medals, all won by Haider Ali, two golds in discus and javelin, and a bronze in long jump. At the 2022 Hangzhou Games, Haider Ali won a solitary gold in the men's discus throw, followed by a silver at the 2026 Nagoya Games.

Games	Rank	Gold	Silver	Bronze	Total
2010 Guangzhou	13	2	1	1	4
2014 Incheon	32	0	0	1	1
2018 Jakarta	20	2	0	1	3
2022 Hangzhou	24	1	0	0	1
2026 Aichi-Nagoya	27	0	1	0	1
Total	22	5	2	3	10

== Indoor Games results ==
Pakistan has sent athletes in all the revisions of the Asian Indoor Games except the 2009 Games in Hanoi. Pakistan has never won a gold medal in these Games. In the 2005 Asian Indoor Games, held in Bangkok, Thailand from 12 to 19 November 2005, only one Pakistani athlete, Abdul Rashid, succeeded in winning a medal, a silver in the 60 m sprint. Pakistan won several medals in the 2007 Macau Games, held from 26 October to 3 November 2007; a silver was won by the Pakistan national kabaddi team and Muhammad Sajjad earned a bronze in the 60 m hurdles. Pakistan didn't compete in the 2009 games.

Games	Rank	Gold	Silver	Bronze	Total
2005 Bangkok	22	0	1	0	1
2007 Macau	24	0	1	1	2
Total	29	0	2	1	3

== Beach Games results ==
Pakistan has sent its delegation to all the editions of Asian Beach Games, a biennial multi-sport event which features sporting events played on a seaside beach. In the 2008 Asian Beach Games, held in Bali, Indonesia, from 18 to 26 October 2008, Pakistani athletes won a total of seven medals, with two gold. In the 2010 Asian Beach Games, organised in Muscat, Oman from 8 to 16 December, Pakistan won a total of six medals, but no gold, and finished at the 15th spot in the medal table. In the 2012 edition in Haiyang, China, they won a silver medal in beach kabaddi after a loss to Iran and a total of two medals. The 2014 Games in Phuket, Thailand, saw Pakistan win 10 medals, including two golds, with the beach kabaddi team once again securing silver after reaching the final. At the 2016 Games in Da Nang, Vietnam, Pakistan's ju-jitsu team contributed significantly to the overall tally, and the beach kabaddi team won gold by defeating India 30-28. In the 2026 edition held in Sanya, China, Pakistan finished with three medals, two silvers won by wrestlers Muhammad Inam and Asadullah, and one bronze from the beach kabaddi team.

Games	Rank	Gold	Silver	Bronze	Total
2008 Bali	11	2	2	3	7
2010 Muscat	15	0	4	2	6
2012 Haiyang	13	0	1	1	2
2014 Phuket	16	2	4	4	10
2016 Danang	21	2	3	6	11
2026 Sanya	15	0	2	1	3
Total		6	16	17	39

== Martial Arts Games results ==
Pakistan participated in the First Asian Martial Arts Games held in Bangkok, Thailand, from 1 to 9 August 2009. Pakistan won a total of nine medals in the Games, including three gold, two silver and four bronze.

Games	Rank	Gold	Silver	Bronze	Total
2009 Bangkok	11	3	2	4	9

== Youth Games results ==
Pakistan participated in the First Asian Youth Games held in Singapore from 29 June to 7 July 2009. The delegation from Pakistan consisted of 12 officials and 27 competitors (five women and twenty-two men). Pakistani athletes competed in sailing, athletics, swimming and table tennis. Raheem Khan won a bronze in the javelin throw event of athletics. Khan was the only medalist from the Pakistani side. None of the remaining athletes advanced past the qualifying stages, and thus did not win any medals. Pakistan ranked 21st and finished last in the medal table of the Games, a position shared with four other Asian National Olympic Committees. Pakistan didn't win any medal in 2013 games. Pakistan won three medals at the 2025 Games including a silver by boys volleyball team, and bronze medals by boys Kabaddi team and wrestler Hassan Ali in Beach Wrestling.

Games	Rank	Gold	Silver	Bronze	Total
2009 Singapore	21	0	0	1	1
2013 Nanjing	–	0	0	0	0
2025 Bahrain	32	0	1	2	3
Total	34	0	1	3	4

== Indoor and Martial Arts Games results ==
Asian Indoor Games and Martial Arts Games were combined into one event and called Asian Indoor and Martial Arts Games. The first edition of these games was held in Incheon in 2013. Pakistan sent 8 athletes to the event but couldn't win any medal. Pakistan sent 107 athletes to Ashgabat 2017 and won 21 medals including 2 gold, 3 silver and 16 bronze.

Games	Rank	Gold	Silver	Bronze	Total
2013 Incheon	–	0	0	0	0
2017 Ashgabat	22	2	3	16	21
2026 Riyadh	future event				
Total		2	3	16	21

== South Asian Games results ==
A red box around the year indicates the games were hosted by Pakistan

Being a part of South Asian region, Pakistan takes part in the South Asian Games, which were previously known as SAF Games. 13 editions of these games have taken place so far. Pakistan finished at second place in seven of these. It finished third four times and on two occasions, it ended up in fourth place. Pakistan's biggest haul came in 2006 games in Colombo when it won 158 medals including 43 golds. Eight nations including India, Pakistan, Sri Lanka, Bangladesh, Nepal, Bhutan, Maldives and Afghanistan take part in South Asian games.

Games	Rank	Gold	Silver	Bronze	Total
(Nepal) 1984 Kathmandu	3	5	3	2	10
(Bangladesh) 1985 Dhaka	2	21	26	12	59
(India) 1987 Calcutta	2	16	36	14	66
(Pakistan) 1989 Islamabad	2	42	33	22	97
(Sri Lanka) 1991 Colombo	3	28	32	25	85
(Bangladesh) 1993 Dhaka	2	23	22	20	65
(India) 1995 Madras	3	10	33	36	79
(Nepal) 1999 Kathmandu	4	10	36	30	76
(Pakistan) 2004 Islamabad	2	38	55	50	143
(Sri Lanka) 2006 Colombo	2	43	44	71	158
(Bangladesh) 2010 Dhaka	2	19	25	36	80
(India) 2016 Guwahati / Shillong	3	12	35	57	104
(Nepal) 2019 Kathmandu/Pokhara/Jankpur	4	30	41	57	128
Total	2	297	421	432	1150

== See also ==
- Pakistan at the Olympics
- Pakistan at the Commonwealth Games

== Notes and references ==
Notes

- ^{a} The National Olympic Committees are all members of the Association of National Olympic Committees (ANOC), which is also split among five continental associations: Association of National Olympic Committees of Africa, Pan American Sports Organization, Olympic Council of Asia, European Olympic Committees, and Oceania National Olympic Committees.
