= Bahadur Singh Sagoo =

Indian shot putter

Bahadur Singh
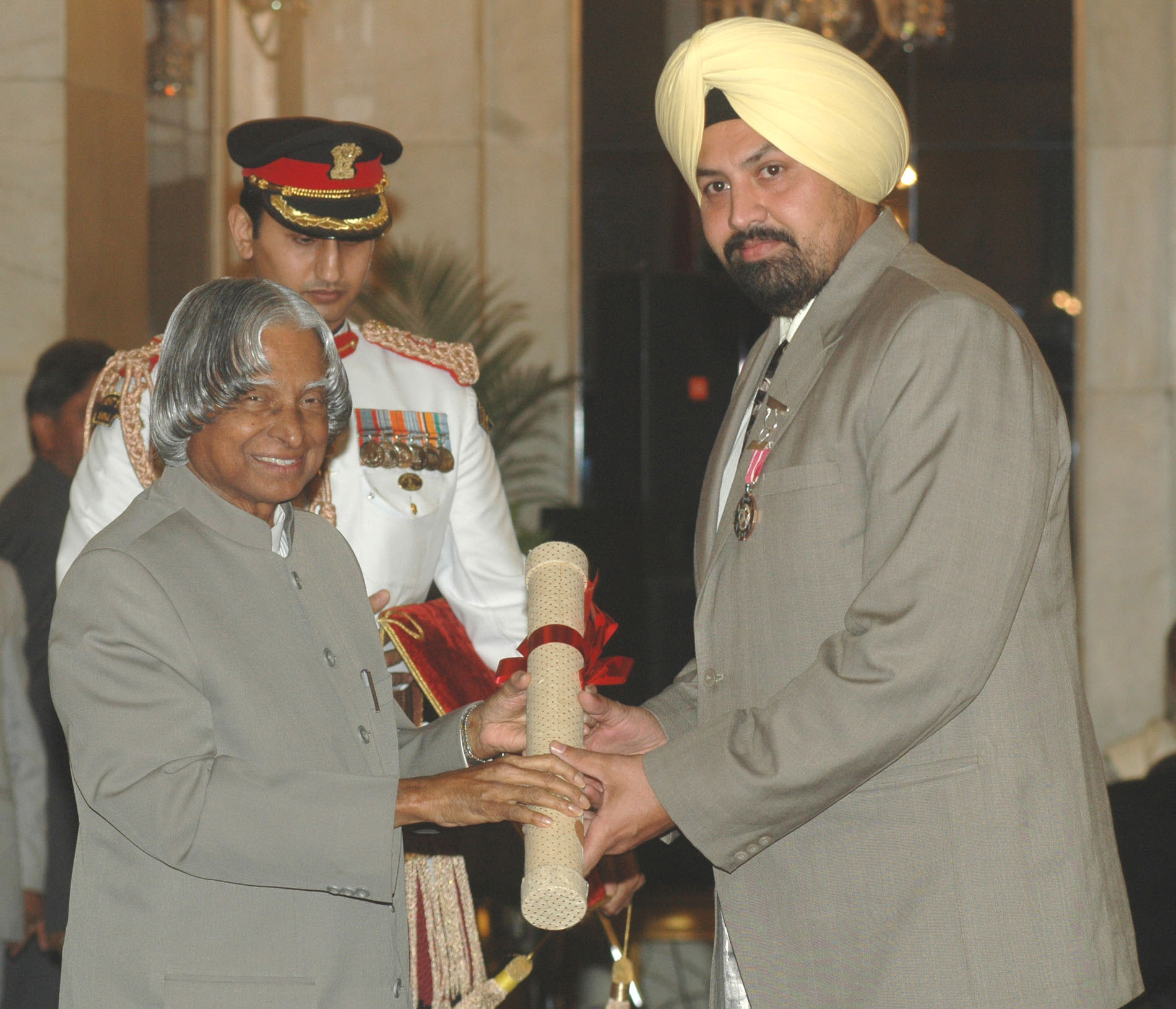
- Bahadur Singh Sagoo receiving Padma Shri

Personal information
- Nationality: Indian
- Born: 9 May 1973 (age 53)

Sport
- Country: India
- Sport: Track and field
- Event: Shot put

Achievements and titles
- Personal best: Shot put: 20.40 m
Medal record
Men's Athletics
Representing India
Asian Games
Gold medal – first place	2002 Busan	Shot put

Bahadur Singh Sagoo (born 7 May 1973) is an Indian former shot putter who competed in the 2000 Summer Olympics and in the 2004 Summer Olympics. He is a recipient of the civilian honour of Padma Shri.
