= Supoj Saenla =

Thai snooker player (born 1980)

Personal information
- Born: August 15, 1980 (age 46)

Sport
- Country: Thailand
- Sport: Snooker
- Professional: 2003/2004, 2007–2009
- Highest ranking: 72 (2008/2009)
Medal record
Men's snooker
Representing Thailand
Asian Games
Silver medal – second place	2002 Busan	Individual
Southeast Asian Games
Gold medal – first place	2001 Kuala Lumpur	Team
Silver medal – second place	2005 Manila	Team
Gold medal – first place	2009 Vientiane	Individual

Supoj Saenla (Thai: สุพจน์ แสนหล้า; born August 15, 1980) is a former Thai professional snooker player.

== Career ==
Saenla joined the professional tour for the first time in 2003 by winning the 2001 Asian U-21 Championship. He was relegated after the 2004/05 season. In 2007, he earned his place back by winning the 2007 Asian Championship. He beat India's Yasin Merchant 7–0 in the final of that tournament. Saenla finished the 2008/09 season 82nd in the world rankings, and lost his place on the main tour for the second time.

== Career finals ==
=== Pro-am finals: 2 (1 title) ===
Outcome	No.	Year	Championship	Opponent in the final	Score
Runner-up	1.	2002	Asian Games	(China) Ding Junhui	1–3
Winner	1.	2009	Southeast Asian Games	(Malaysia) Thor Chuan Leong	4–3

=== Team finals: 1 ===
Outcome	No.	Year	Championship	Team	Opponent in the final	Score
Runner-up	1.	2007	Euro-Asia Team Challenge	Team Asia	Europe	3–5

=== Amateur finals: 5 (4 titles) ===
Outcome	No.	Year	Championship	Opponent in the final	Score
Winner	1.	2001	Asian Under-21 Championship	(India) Manan Chandra	6–0
Winner	2.	2007	Asian Amateur Championship	(India) Yasin Merchant	7–0
Winner	3.	2007	Thailand Amateur Championship	(Thailand) Thepchaiya Un-Nooh	5–4
Winner	4.	2009	Thailand Amateur Championship (2)	(Thailand) Kobkit Palajin	5–1
Runner-upr	1.	2010	Thailand Amateur Championship	(Thailand) Noppadol Sangnil	3–5
