= Hsia Hui-kai =

Taiwanese professional pool player

Personal information
- Born: 1975 (age 50–51)

Sport
- Country: Taiwan
- Sport: Snooker
- Professional: 1992-2007
- Best ranking finish: Winner

Tournament wins
- Ranking: 4
- Minor-ranking: 0

Hsia Hui-kai (Chinese: 夏揮凱; pinyin: Xià Huìkǎi) is a retired professional pool player from Taiwan. He has competed in various regional and international cue sports tournaments and is nicknamed "Assassin" and "Invincible Iron Man" by the Taiwanese media.

== Biography ==
Hsia Hui-kai, born in 1975, first encountered billiards at the age of thirteen. Despite initial parental disapproval due to prevailing social stereotypes that unfairly associated billiards with academic underachievement and smoking, Hsia demonstrated exceptional talent for the sport. His early aptitude quickly translated into success in domestic competitions, leading his family to shift from opposition to active support. In 1992, at the age of sixteen, Hsia secured the World Cup Nine-Ball Junior Championship, a title he successfully defended in 1993. Upon graduating from high school, he committed to a professional billiards career. Distinguished by a muscular physique uncommon among billiard players, he earned the moniker "Invincible Iron Man". By the age of twenty-three, Hsia had attained a national ranking of second.

After several international competition wins, retired in 2008 after enrolling in the Cheng Shiu University and later became a tutor.

== Career ==
Hsia Hui-kai has competed in several professional pool tournaments, representing Taiwan several in international events.

He has attended Asian Games and numerous individual competitions while representing Taiwan. In 2002 he won the Men's eight-ball singles at the 2002 Asian Games and won Taiwan's first gold medal at the event. In 2003, Hsia went to the final of the 2003 World Pool Masters losing 8–6 to Tony Drago of Malta. In 2007, Hsai advanced to the quarter finals of the World Pool Championship but failed to progress any further.

Competition Name	Year	Placement	Reference
2008 Intercollegiate Billiards Championship	2008	Unknown	
World Pool Championship	2007	9th	
San Miguel Asian 9-Ball Tour Stop ?	2004	13th	
San Miguel Asian 9-Ball Tour Stop ?	2004	2nd	
San Miguel Asian 9-Ball Tour Stop ?	2004	9th	
BCA Open 9-Ball Championship Men's Division	2004	17th	
San Miguel Asian 9-Ball Tour Stop ?	2004	17th	
World Pool Championship	2004	17th	
San Miguel Asian 9-Ball Tour Stop ?	2003	3rd	
San Miguel Asian 9-Ball Tour Stop 2	2003	17th	
World Pool Championship	2003	5th	
World Pool Masters	2003	2nd	
World Pool League	2003	3rd	
Asian Games - Men's Eight-Ball Singles	2002	1st	
IBC Pool Stop 1	2002	9th	
BCA Open 9-Ball Championship Men's Division	2001	49th	
Admiral World Championship	2001	33rd	
Tokyo 9-Ball Event	2001	33rd	
World Pool Championship	2000	33rd	
Asian Cup Championship	2000	1st	
World Nine-Ball Junior Championship	1993	1st	
World Cup Nine-Ball Junior Championship	1992	1st	

== See also ==
- Pool (cue sports)
