= Ryuuji Umeda =

Medal record

Representing Japan

Men's Three-cushion billiards

Asian Games
Silver medal – second place	1998 Bangkok	Individual
Gold medal – first place	2006 Doha	Individual

Asian Indoor and Martial Arts Games
Gold medal – first place	2013 Incheon	Individual

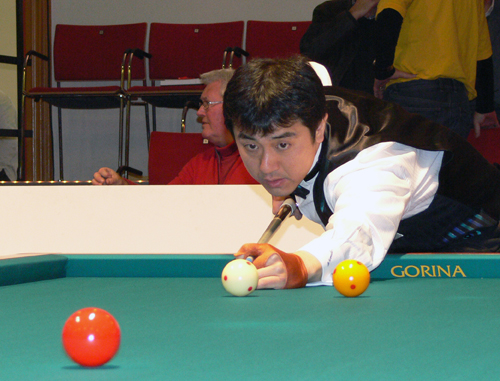

Ryūji Umeda (梅田 竜二; sometimes transliterated Ryuji or Ryugi, and often rendered as Umeda Ryuuji in Western media; born October 22, 1968, in Tokyo) is a Japanese professional three-cushion billiards player.

== Career ==
In 1998, Umeda finished 2nd to fellow Japanese Akio Shimada in the three-cushion event of the Asian Games. He later won it against Duong Anh Vu of Vietnam in 2006.

A year afterward, he dominated the UMB World Three-cushion Championship by defeating Daniel Sánchez, the two-time world champion from Spain. With the victory, he became the second Asian to win it in 34 years after Nobuaki Kobayashi.
