= Inderpal Singh (rower) =

Indian rower (born 1975)

Personal information
- Nationality: Indian
- Born: 2 March 1975 (age 51)

Sport
- Sport: Rowing

Inderpal Singh (born 2 March 1975) is an Indian rower. He competed in the men's coxless pair event at the 2000 Summer Olympics. At the 2002 Busan Asian Games, he won a bronze medal in the men's coxless four. He is now an Indian coach.

His son Parminder Singh won a bronze medal in the 2022 Asian Games at Hangzhou, China; journalists documented the emulation of father-and-son duo who have won medals at the Asian Games.
