= Chan Wai Ki =

Hong Kong snooker player (born 1973)

Medal record

Men's Snooker

Asian Games
| Silver medal – second place | 2006 Doha | Doubles |
| Silver medal – second place | 2006 Doha | Team |

Asian Indoor Games
| Gold medal – first place | 2007 Macau | Team |

Chan Wai Ki
- Traditional Chinese: 陳偉麒
- Simplified Chinese: 陈伟麒
Transcriptions
Standard Mandarin
- Hanyu Pinyin: Chén Wěiqí
Yue: Cantonese
- Jyutping: Can^{4} Wai^{5} Kei^{4}
- IPA: [tsʰɐn˩ wɐj˩˧.kʰej˩]

Chan Wai Ki (Chinese: 陳偉麒; born 4 May 1973) is a snooker player from Hong Kong, China who won two silver medals at the 2006 Asian Games in the doubles and team competitions. Earlier in 2006 he had become the first player in a Malaysian tournament to score a maximum 147 break.
