= Saleh Mohammad (snooker player) =

Afghan snooker player (born 1973)

Saleh Mohammad Mohammadi
Personal information
- Born: 24 February 1973 (age 53) Kingdom of Afghanistan

Sport
- Country: Afghanistan (2009–present); Pakistan (1988–2008)
- Sport: Snooker
- Professional: 1998/1999
Medal record
Men's Snooker
Representing Pakistan
Asian Games
Bronze medal – third place	2002 Busan	Doubles
Bronze medal – third place	2002 Busan	Team
Representing Afghanistan
Asian Indoor and Martial Arts Games
Bronze medal – third place	2013 Incheon	Individual
Bronze medal – third place	2017 Ashgabat	6-Red Singles
Bronze medal – third place	2017 Ashgabat	Team

Saleh Mohammad Mohammadi (born 24 February 1973) is a professional snooker player from Afghanistan. He represented Pakistan between 1988 and 2006. He reached the final of the IBSF World Snooker Championship in 2003 and won two medals at 2002 Asian Games.

== Life and career ==
Mohammadi was born in Afghanistan and lived as a refugee among the Afghans in Pakistan. He began representing Pakistan in 1988 as an international snooker player. Mohammadi turned pro in 1995, but lost his place after just one season. In 2003, he reached the finals of the IBSF World Snooker Championship by winning 14 consecutive matches, but lost 5–11 against Pankaj Advani. At the cue sports competitions of the 2002 Asian Games, he won two bronze medals in doubles and team category. At the 2008 ACBS Asian Snooker Championship, Mohammadi compiled a maximum break against Nguyen Nhat Thanh. At the end of the same year, he decided to retire in protest, because he "couldn't bear such injustice where cricketers were showered with cash awards on normal victories" and he "wasn't given anything."

In November 2010, after moving back to Afghanistan, Mohammadi told the Gulf News, "I want to give back something to my country and the only way I can do this is to assist Afghanistan's development in sports, particularly in snooker as that is what I am good at." He represented Afghanistan at the 2012 ACBS Asian Snooker Championship, reaching the quarter-finals, and at the 2012 Six-red World Championship, reaching the last 32. In the Jubilee Insurance 29th Asian Snooker Championship, he decisively beat his Pakistani, Mongolian and Iranian rivals. On 19 June 2013, the World Snooker announced that Mohammadi did not confirm his intention to compete in the Main Tour, and was replaced by Ratchayothin Yotharuck.

== Performance and rankings timeline ==
Tournament	1995/ 96	1998/ 99	2008/ 09	2012/ 13
Ranking (Note: It shows the ranking at the beginning of the season)	(Note: He was an amateur)	(Note: New players on the Main Tour do not have a ranking)		
Ranking tournaments
UK Championship	A	LQ	A	A
Welsh Open	A	LQ	A	A
World Open (Note: The event was called the Grand Prix (1995/1996, 1998/1999 and 2008/2009))	A	LQ	A	WR
Players Tour Championship Final	Tournament Not Held			DNQ
China Open (Note: The event was called the China International (1998/1999))	NH	LQ	A	A
World Championship	A	WD	A	A
Non-ranking tournaments
Six-red World Championship (Note: The event was called the Six-red Snooker International (2008/2009))	A	A	QF	2R
Former ranking tournaments
Irish Open (Note: The event was called the European Open (1995/1996))	A	LQ	Not Held	
Scottish Open (Note: The event was called the International Open (1995/1996))	A	WD	NH	MR
Thailand Masters (Note: The event was called the Thailand Open (1995/1996))	A	LQ	Not Held	
British Open	A	WD	Not Held	
Former non-ranking tournaments
Red & White Challenge	QF	Tournament Not Held		

Performance Table Legend
LQ	lost in the qualifying draw	#R	lost in the early rounds of the tournament (WR = Wildcard round, RR = Round robin)	QF	lost in the quarter-finals
SF	lost in the semi-finals	F	lost in the final	W	won the tournament
DNQ	did not qualify for the tournament	A	did not participate in the tournament	WD	withdrew from the tournament

NH / Not Held	event was not held
NR / Non-Ranking Event	event is/was no longer a ranking event
R / Ranking Event	event is/was a ranking event
MR / Minor-Ranking Event	event is/was a minor-ranking event

== Amateur finals: 8 (4 titles) ==
Outcome	No.	Year	Championship	Opponent in the final	Score
Winner	1.	1995	Pakistan Amateur Championship (1)	(Pakistan) Mohammed Shafiq	8–5
Winner	2.	1999	Pakistan Amateur Championship (2)	(Pakistan) Farhan Mirza	8–6
Runner-up	1.	2000	Pakistan Amateur Championship (1)	(Pakistan) Muhammad Yousaf	4–8
Runner-up	2.	2003	IBSF World Snooker Championship	(India) Pankaj Advani	5–11
Winner	3.	2005	Pakistan Amateur Championship (3)	(Pakistan) Naveen Perwani	6–2
Runner-up	3.	2008	Pakistan Amateur Championship (2)	(Pakistan) Muhammad Sajjad	3–7
Winner	4.	2013	Asian Snooker Championship	(Syria) Omar Al Kojah	7–2
Runner-up	4.	2018	World Amateur Championship - Masters	(Wales) Darren Morgan	0–6
