= Antonio Lining =

Filipino pool player (born 1963)

Personal information
- Nickname: "Nikoy"
- Born: 9 May 1963 (age 63) Mindoro, Philippines

Pool career
- Country: Philippines
- Pool games: Nine-ball, Ten-ball
- Best finish: Semi finals 2010 WPA World Nine-ball Championship; Semi finals 2009 WPA World Ten-ball Championship; Runner up 2010 China Nine-ball Open
Medal record
Representing Philippines
Men's nine-ball
Southeast Asian Games
Gold medal – first place	2001 Kuala Lumpur	Singles

Antonio Lining (born May 9, 1963, in Mindoro, Philippines) is a Filipino pool player, nicknamed "Nikoy". He is one of the few left-handed Asian players. Lining reached the semifinals of the WPA World Ten-Ball Championship in 2009 and the WPA World Nine-Ball Championship in 2010.

Lining's most notable appearance was in the Motolite International Nine-ball Tournament in 2000, where he finished second to Francisco Bustamante, having beaten Efren Reyes in the quarter-finals. Also in 2000, Lining won the All Japan Championship Nine-ball, beating Chao Fong-pang in the final.

At the 2002 Busan Asian Games, Lining and Bustamante won the gold medal at the nine-ball doubles event.

Between 1992 and 2017, Lining has played in one or more of the All Japan Championship (Nine Ball), U.S. Open Championship (Nine Ball) and the World Pool Championship (Nine Ball).

== Achievements ==
- 2024 Tokai Grand Prix
- 2024 KKKing Imperial X Han Billiards Nine-ball
- 2016 Taom Tips Tour Stop 1
- 2015 Kantō Ten-ball Open
- 2014 Japan Open Ten-ball
- 2006 Japan Open Nine-ball
- 2005 Brunswick Tokyo Open
- 2002 Asian Games Nine-ball doubles
- 2001 Southeast Asian Games Nine-ball Singles
- 2000 All Japan Championship Nine-ball
- 1999 Muntinlupa Nine-ball Open
- 1998 Hokuriku Nine-ball Open
- 1998 Amagasaki Nine-ball Open
- 1997 Davao Nine-ball Open
- 1995 Davao Nine-ball Open
- 1994 Asian Nine-ball Championship
- 1994 Indonesian Nine-ball Open
- 1993 JJ's Billiards Nine-ball Open
- 1992 Tung Pa Nine-ball Open
- 1992 Himeji Nine-ball Open
- 1989 Scratch Nine-ball Open
