= Yang Ching-shun =

Taiwanese pool player (1978–2023)

Medal record

Men's nine-ball

Representing Chinese Taipei

World Games
Gold medal – first place	2001 Akita	Individual
Silver medal – second place	2009 Kaohsiung	Individual

Asian Games
Gold medal – first place	1998 Bangkok	Individual
Gold medal – first place	2002 Busan	Individual
Bronze medal – third place	2006 Doha	Individual

East Asian Games
Silver medal – second place	2009 Hong Kong	Singles

Yang Ching-shun (Chinese: 楊清順; 3 April 1978 – 6 December 2023) was a Taiwanese professional pool player, nicknamed "the Son of Pool".

== Biography ==
Yang won the nine-ball event of the 1998 Asian Games against then World Pool champion Kunihiko Takahashi. He defended it in 2002 against Warren Kiamco. In an unsuccessful attempt to defend that title for the second time, Yang settled for third place as he was bested in the semi-finals by Jeff de Luna who then finished second to Antonio Gabica.

Even though he never won a world championship in any discipline of pool as his fellow Taiwanese player Chao Fong-pang did, Yang was often regarded as a potential world champion.

His best finish in the World Pool Championship is third where he reached the semi-finals in 2002. However, he was bested by Francisco Bustamante who eventually lost to Earl Strickland in the finals.

When his father died while he was still a child, Yang was left to fend for himself along with his mother. He expressed no interest in his studies and chose to work in a local billiard hall near his home, where he met Chao Fong-pang. He first started playing pool at the age of 14 and by the time he was 16, he was Japan Open champion beating Francisco Bustamante. His hobbies included golf and fishing.

Yang Ching-shun died on 6 December 2023, at the age of 45. Billiards coach and commentator Chang Ming-hsiung stated that Yang died of cancer.

== Titles ==
- 2008 Guinness Asian 9-Ball Tour (Jakarta Leg)
- 2007 Guinness Asian 9-Ball Tour (Singapore Leg)
- 2007 Guinness Asian 9-Ball Tour (China Leg)
- 2007 Guinness Asian 9-Ball Tour (Kaohshiung Leg)
- 2007 Money Game King Showdown
- 2006 Mezz Crowd Nine-ball Doubles Cup
- 2005 Guinness Asian 9-Ball Tour (Kaohsiung Leg)
- 2004 Guinness Asian 9-Ball Tour (Hong Kong Leg)
- 2003 Guinness Asian 9-Ball Tour (Singapore Leg)
- 2002 Asian Games Nine-ball Singles
- 2001 World Games Nine-ball Singles
- 2002 Asian Games Nine-ball Singles
- 1996 All Japan Championship 9-Ball
