= Fung Kwok Wai =

Hong Kong snooker player (born 1977)

Personal information
- Born: 22 August 1977 (age 49)

Sport
- Country: Hong Kong
- Sport: Snooker

Fung Kwok Wai
Medal record

Men's Snooker

Asian Games
| Gold medal – first place | 2002 Busan | Team |
| Silver medal – second place | 2006 Doha | Team |

East Asian Games
| Gold medal – first place | 2009 Hong Kong | Team |

Asian Indoor Games
| Gold medal – first place | 2007 Macau | Team |

East Asian Games
| Gold medal – first place | 2009 Hong Kong | Team |

Fung Kwok Wai
- Traditional Chinese: 馮國威
- Simplified Chinese: 冯国威
Transcriptions
Standard Mandarin
- Hanyu Pinyin: Féng Guówēi
Yue: Cantonese
- Jyutping: fung^{4} gwok^{3} wai^{1}
- IPA: [fʊŋ˩ kʷɔk̚˧.wɐj˥]

Fung Kwok Wai (Chinese: 馮國威; born 22 August 1977) is an amateur snooker player from Hong Kong.

Fung reached the quarter final at the 2006 IBSF World Championships in Amman, Jordan, where he was eliminated by Daniel Ward 6–3. He won the silver medal in the 2006 Asian Games with the men's snooker team. He also won the gold medal in the 2009 East Asian Games with the men's snooker team.

== Biography ==
Fung Kwok Wai was born in Great Britain on 22 August 1977. When he was four years old, he moved to Belgium. As a nine-year-old, he took up snooker with his father. At the age of 16, he trained with the British snooker player Paul Hunter. Around 1992, he took lessons at a snooker club in Belgium where coaches trained him. Fung moved from Belgium to Hong Kong in 2001.

Fung competed in two snooker team events at the 1998 Asian Games in Bangkok. He received a gold medal in a snooker team event at the 2002 Asian Games in Busan and a silver medal in a snooker team event at the 2006 Asian Games in Doha.
