= India at the 2002 Asian Games =

- IOC code: IND
- NOC: Indian Olympic Association

in Busan
- Flag bearer: Dhanraj Pillay
- Medals Ranked 7th: Gold 11 Silver 12 Bronze 13 Total 36

Asian Games appearances (overview)
- 1951; 1954; 1958; 1962; 1966; 1970; 1974; 1978; 1982; 1986; 1990; 1994; 1998; 2002; 2006; 2010; 2014; 2018; 2022; 2026

India competed at the 2002 Asian Games held in Busan, South Korea. India was ranked 8th with 10 gold medals. Sunita Rani's gold and bronze medals, which she won in the women's 1,500 m and 5,000 m was reinstated after she appealed in the dope scam. India moved up to the seventh spot from the previous eighth spot in the medals table.

== Medal table ==
Sport	Gold	Silver	Bronze	Total
Athletics	7	6	4	17
Tennis	1	1	2	4
Cue Sports	1	1	1	3
Kabaddi	1	0	0	1
Golf	1	0	0	1
Shooting	0	2	0	2
Sailing	0	1	2	3
Hockey	0	1	0	1
Taekwondo	0	0	1	1
Equestrian	0	0	1	1
Rowing	0	0	1	1
Wrestling	0	0	1	1
Total	11	12	13	36

== Medalists ==
Medal	Name	Sport	Event
Gold	Saraswati Saha	Athletics	Women's 200 metres
Gold	K. M. Beenamol	Athletics	Women's 400 metres
Gold	Sunita Rani	Athletics	Women's 1500 metres
Gold	Neelam Jaswant Singh	Athletics	Women's Discus Throw
Gold	Anju Bobby George	Athletics	Women's Long Jump
Gold	Manjeet Kaur; Soma Biswas; K. M. Beenamol; Jincy Phillip	Athletics	Women's 4 × 400 metres relay
Gold	Bahadur Singh Sagoo	Athletics	Men's Shot Put
Gold	Men's Team	Kabaddi	Men
Gold	Shiv Kapur	Golf	Men's Individual
Gold	Leander Paes; Mahesh Bhupathi	Tennis	Men's Double
Gold	Yasin Merchant; Rafat Habib	Cue sports	Snooker Doubles
Silver	K. M. Beenamol	Athletics	Women's 400 metres
Silver	Madhuri Singh	Athletics	Women's 800 metres
Silver	Bobby Aloysius	Athletics	Women's High Jump
Silver	Soma Biswas	Athletics	Women's Heptathlon
Silver	K. M. Binu	Athletics	Men's 800 metres
Silver	Purakkotte Ramachandran; K. J. Manoj Lal; Satvir Singh; Bhupinder Singh	Athletics	Men's 4 × 400 metres relay
Silver	Geet Sethi; Alok Kumar	Cue sports	English Billiards Doubles
Silver	Manavjit Singh Sandhu; Mansher Singh; Anwer Sultan	Shooting	Men's Trap Team
Silver	Anjali Bhagwat; Deepali Deshpande; Suma Shirur	Shooting	Women's 10 metre Air Rifle Team
Silver	Nitin Mongia	Sailing	OK Dinghy
Silver	Men's Team	Hockey	Men
Silver	Manisha Malhotra; Mahesh Bhupathi	Tennis	Mixed Double
Bronze	Sunita Rani	Athletics	Women's 5000 metres
Bronze	J. J. Shobha	Athletics	Women's Heptathlon
Bronze	Shakti Singh	Athletics	Men's Shot Put
Bronze	Anil Kumar	Athletics	Men's Discus Throw
Bronze	Vishal Uppal; Mustafa Ghouse	Tennis	Men's Double
Bronze	Leander Paes; Sania Mirza	Tennis	Mixed Double
Bronze	Geet Sethi	Cue sports	English Billiards Singles
Bronze	Palwinder Singh Cheema	Wrestling	Men's freestyle 120 kg
Bronze	Jenil Krishnan; Inderpal Singh; Roshan Lal; Paulose Pandari Kunnel	Rowing	Men's Coxless Four
Bronze	Indrajit Lamba; Bhagirath Singh; Rajesh Pattu; Deep Kumar Ahlawat	Equestrian	Team Eventing
Bronze	Rajesh Choudhary	Sailing	Laser Radial
Bronze	Aashim Mongia; Mahesh Ramchandran	Sailing	Enterprise
Bronze	Surendra Bhandari	Taekwondo	Men's 58 kg

== Athletics ==
=== Men ===
Track & road events

Athletes	Event	Heats		Semifinal		Final	
Athletes	Event	Result	Rank	Result	Rank	Result	Rank
Anand Menezes	200 m	21.53	5 Q	21.77	8	did not advance	
Purukottam Ramachandran	400 m	46.79	2 Q	47.42	4 Q	46.15	5
Paramjit Singh	400 m	47.58	4 Q	47.50	5	did not advance	
K.M. Binu	800 m	1:47.63	2 Q	—N/a		1:47.57	2nd place, silver medalist(s)
Kuldeep Kumar	1500 m	—N/a				3:49.37	7
Gulab Chand	10000 m	DNF					
Anil Kumar Prakash; Clifford Joshua (H); Piyush Kumar; Sanjay Ghosh; Anand Menezes	Men's 4 × 100 metres relay	39.71	3 Q	—N/a		39.36	4
Bhupinder Singh; Purukottam Ramachandran; Paramjit Singh (H); Jata Shankar (H); Manoj Lal; Satvir Singh	Men's 4 × 400 metres relay	3:06.14	2 Q	—N/a		3:04.22	2nd place, silver medalist(s)

Field events

Athletes	Event	Final	
Athletes	Event	Result	Rank
Anil Kumar	Discus Throw	59.81	3rd place, bronze medalist(s)
Shakti Singh	Shot Put	18.27	3rd place, bronze medalist(s)
Bahadur Singh Sagoo	Shot Put	19.03	1st place, gold medalist(s)
Harminder Singh	Javelin Throw	75.93	6
Pramod Tiwari	Hammer Throw	64.54	6

== Badminton ==
Athlete	Event	Round of 32	Round of 16	Quarterfinal	Semifinal	Final / BM
Athlete	Event	Opposition Score	Opposition Score	Opposition Score	Opposition Score	Rank
Abhinn Shyam Gupta	Men's Singles	Hendrawan (INA); L 0-2(5–15,5-15)	did not advance			
Pullela Gopichand	Men's Singles	Francisco Yong (TMP); W 2-0(15–0,15-0)	Boonsak Ponsana (THA); W 2-0(17–15,15-6)	Shon Seung-mo (KOR); L 0-2(9–15,11-15)	did not advance	

== Field hockey ==
=== Men ===
Team

- Devesh Chauhan
- Bharat Chettri
- Dilip Tirkey
- Jugraj Singh
- Kamalpreet Singh
- Dinesh Nayak
- Viren Rasquinha
- Vikram Pillay
- Ignace Tirkey
- Bimal Lakra
- Dhanraj Pillay
- Deepak Thakur
- Prabhjot Singh
- Daljit Singh Dhillon
- Gagan Ajit Singh
- Tejbir Singh

=== Preliminary ===
==== Group A ====
Team	Pld	W	D	L	GF	GA	GD	Pts	Qualification
South Korea	3	2	1	0	19	2	+17	7	Semifinals
India	3	2	1	0	9	2	+7	7	Semifinals
Japan	3	1	0	2	4	10	−6	3	
Hong Kong	3	0	0	3	5	23	−18	0	

30 September
10:00

India	5–1	Hong Kong

Gangseo Hockey Stadium, Busan

2 October
12:30

India	3–0	Japan

Gangseo Hockey Stadium, Busan

4 October
15:00

South Korea	1–1	India

Gangseo Hockey Stadium, Busan

=== Knockout round ===
==== Semifinals ====
10 October
14:00

Pakistan	3–4	India
Abbas 10', 26'; Sh. Muhammad 63'	Report	Pillay 6', 21'; D. Singh 41'; GA Singh 67'

Gangseo Hockey Stadium, Busan
Umpires:
Murray Grime (AUS)

==== Final ====
12 October
15:00

South Korea (gold)	4–3	India (silver)
Keon-wook 24'; Woon-kon 30', 68'; Seung-tae 44'	Report	J. Singh 48', 60'; GA Singh 53'

Gangseo Hockey Stadium, Busan
Umpires:
Colin Hutchinson (IRE)

=== Women ===
Team

- Tingonleima Chanu
- Amandeep Kaur
- Suman Bala
- Suraj Lata Devi
- Sita Gussain
- Sumrai Tete
- Pritam Rani Siwach
- Mamta Kharab
- Jyoti Sunita Kullu
- Helen Mary
- Masira Surin
- Adline Kerketta
- Kanti Baa
- Manjinder Kaur
- Saba Anjum Karim
- Sanggai Chanu

=== Preliminary round ===
==== Pool ====
Pos	Team	Pld	W	D	L	GF	GA	GD	Pts	Qualification
1	South Korea (H)	3	2	0	1	8	4	+4	6	Gold-medal match
2	China	3	2	0	1	5	2	+3	6	Gold-medal match
3	Japan	3	2	0	1	7	6	+1	6	Bronze-medal match
4	India	3	0	0	3	2	10	−8	0	Bronze-medal match

Source: Reddif
Rules for classification: 1) points; 2) goal difference; 3) goals scored; 4) head-to-head result.
(H) Hosts

==== Fixtures ====
5 October 2002
12:30

China	2–0	India
Chen Z. 38', 61'	Report

7 October 2002
15:00

India	0–5	South Korea
	Report	Oh 32'; Kim J. 48'; Lee M. 59'; Kim E. 61', 67'

9 October 2002
15:00

India	2–3	Japan
Suman 59'; Jyoti 66'	Report	Miura 19', 69'; Kato 63'

=== Final round ===
==== Bronze-medal match ====
11 October 2002
12:00

Japan	2–0	India
Morimoto 29', 44'	Report

== Football ==
=== Men ===
Team Coach: (England) Stephen Constantine

No.	Pos.	Player	Date of birth (age)	Club
1	GK	Rajat Ghosh Dastidar	8 October 1979 (aged 22)	(All India Football Federation) Mohun Bagan
3	DF	Satish Kumar Bharti	26 January 1982 (aged 20)	(All India Football Federation) Mohun Bagan
4	DF	Debjit Ghosh	23 February 1974 (aged 28)	(All India Football Federation) Mohun Bagan
6	MF	Shanmugam Venkatesh	21 November 1978 (aged 23)	(All India Football Federation) East Bengal
7	MF	Tomba Singh	3 April 1982 (aged 20)	(All India Football Federation) Salgaocar
8	MF	Renedy Singh	20 June 1979 (aged 23)	(All India Football Federation) Mohun Bagan
9	FW	Abhishek Yadav	10 June 1980 (aged 22)	(All India Football Federation) Mahindra United
10	FW	Bijen Singh	10 February 1979 (aged 23)	(All India Football Federation) Dempo
11	MF	Jo Paul Ancheri	2 August 1975 (aged 27)	(All India Football Federation) JCT Mills
12	FW	Alex Ambrose	8 September 1982 (aged 20)	(All India Football Federation) Salgaocar
13	DF	Manitombi Singh	10 June 1981 (aged 21)	(All India Football Federation) Salgaocar
14	DF	Mahesh Gawli	23 January 1980 (aged 22)	(All India Football Federation) Churchill Brothers
15	FW	Bhaichung Bhutia	15 December 1976 (aged 25)	(All India Football Federation) Mohun Bagan
16	DF	Samir Subash Naik	8 August 1979 (aged 23)	(All India Football Federation) Dempo
17	DF	Deepak Mondal	12 October 1979 (aged 22)	(All India Football Federation) East Bengal
18	MF	Krishnan Nair Ajayan	30 May 1979 (aged 23)	(All India Football Federation) State Bank of Travancore
19	FW	Parveen Kumar	2 July 1980 (aged 22)	(All India Football Federation) Punjab Police
20	GK	Sangram Mukherjee	6 November 1981 (aged 20)	(All India Football Federation) East Bengal
21	GK	Naseem Akhtar	10 July 1980 (aged 22)	(All India Football Federation) Mahindra United

=== Preliminary round ===
==== Group C ====
Pos	Team	Pld	W	D	L	GF	GA	GD	Pts
1	China	3	3	0	0	9	0	+9	9
2	India	3	2	0	1	6	3	+3	6
3	Turkmenistan	3	1	0	2	4	8	−4	3
4	Bangladesh	3	0	0	3	1	9	−8	0

Source: RSSSF
27 September
19:03

India	3–0	Bangladesh
Bhutia 46', 65'; R. Singh 66'

Munsu Football Stadium, Ulsan

30 September
16:33

Turkmenistan	1–3	India
W. Baýramow 21'		Bhutia 53', 77'; Yadav 56'

Yangsan Stadium, Yangsan

3 October
19:03

China	2–0	India
Yu Tao 16', 45+1'

Yangsan Stadium, Yangsan

== Kabaddi ==
- Ram Mehar Singh
- Shamsher Singh
- Neer Gulia
- B. C. Ramesh
- Manpreet Singh
- Ramesh Kumar
- Sunder Singh
- Jagdish Kumble
- B. C. Suresh
- K. K. Jagdeesha
- Dinesh Kumar
- Sanjeev Kumar

All times are Korea Standard Time (UTC+09:00)

Pos	Team	Pld	W	D	L	PF	PA	PD	Pts
1	India	5	5	0	0	224	84	+140	10
2	Bangladesh	5	3	0	2	174	91	+83	6 (Note: Match points difference against the teams which scored 25% or more of the league points: BAN +4, PAK −55.)
3	Pakistan	5	3	0	2	87	106	−19	6
4	Japan	5	2	0	3	83	107	−24	4
5	Malaysia	5	1	0	4	65	145	−80	2 (Note: Match points difference against the teams which scored 25% or more of the league points: MAS −78, SRI −102.)
6	Sri Lanka	5	1	0	4	64	164	−100	2

Source: Report
Notes:

4 October; 11:00	India	47–21	Malaysia	Tongmyong University, Busan
4 October; 11:00		(32–9)		Tongmyong University, Busan

4 October; 15:00	India	53–21	Japan	Tongmyong University, Busan
4 October; 15:00		(39–3)		Tongmyong University, Busan

5 October; 11:00	Bangladesh	14–37	India	Tongmyong University, Busan
5 October; 11:00		(7–24)		Tongmyong University, Busan

6 October; 17:00	India	50–21	Sri Lanka	Tongmyong University, Busan
6 October; 17:00		(27–6)		Tongmyong University, Busan

7 October; 14:00	India	37–7	Pakistan	Tongmyong University, Busan
7 October; 14:00		(23–4)		Tongmyong University, Busan

=== Final standing ===
Rank	Team	Pld	W	D	L
1st place, gold medalist(s)	India	5	5	0	0
2nd place, silver medalist(s)	Bangladesh	5	3	0	2
3rd place, bronze medalist(s)	Pakistan	5	3	0	2

== Volleyball ==
=== Men ===
Team

- M. S. Rajesh
- Tom Joseph
- Abhijeet Bhattacharya
- Joby Joseph
- Ravikanth Reddy
- Avnish Kumar Yadav
- P. V. Sunil Kumar
- Yejju Subba Rao
- Raghuveer Singh
- Arun Jakhmola
- Amir Singh
- K. J. Kapil Dev

=== Preliminary round ===
==== Pool A ====
Pos	Team	Pld	W	L	Pts	SW	SL	SR	SPW	SPL	SPR
1	South Korea	4	4	0	8	12	0	MAX	302	198	1.525
2	Iran	4	3	1	7	9	5	1.800	327	301	1.086
3	India	4	2	2	6	8	6	1.333	336	308	1.091
4	Qatar	4	1	3	5	3	10	0.300	251	305	0.823
5	Macau	4	0	4	4	1	12	0.083	214	318	0.673

Source: Results

Date	Time		Score		Set 1	Set 2	Set 3	Set 4	Set 5	Total
02 Oct	16:00	South Korea	3–0	India	25–22	25–17	27–25			77–64
03 Oct	16:00	India	2–3	Iran	20–25	23–25	39–37	28–26	12–15	122–128
04 Oct	12:00	Macau	0–3	India	13–25	16–25	21–25			50–75
08 Oct	10:00	India	3–0	Qatar	25–22	25–17	25–14			75–53

=== Rank round ===
5th–8th place
10 October
Chinese Taipei	3
Qatar	0
10 October
India	3
Pakistan	0

5th–6th place
12 October
Chinese Taipei	1
India	3

==== Semifinals ====
Date	Time		Score		Set 1	Set 2	Set 3	Set 4	Set 5	Total
10 Oct	12:00	India	3–0	Pakistan	25–15	25–17	25–15			75–47

==== 5th–6th place ====
Date	Time		Score		Set 1	Set 2	Set 3	Set 4	Set 5	Total
12 Oct	14:00	Chinese Taipei	1–3	India	23–25	21–25	25–18	32–34		101–102
