= Manan Chandra =

Indian snooker and pool player (born 1981)

Personal information
- Born: 28 February 1981 (age 45)

Sport
- Country: India
- Sport: Snooker
- Professional: 2002/2003

Manan Chandra
Medal record

Representing India

Men's Snooker

Asian Indoor Games
Bronze medal – third place	2007 Macau	Team
Gold medal – first place	2009 Ho Chi Minh City	Team

Asian Team Snooker Championship
Gold medal – first place	2013 Asian Team Snooker Championship	Team

World Snooker Team Cup
Gold medal – first place	2018 Doha	Team

Manan Chandra (born 28 February 1981 in New Delhi) is an Indian amateur snooker and pool player.

Chandra reached the semi-final at the 2006 IBSF World Championships in Amman, Jordan, where he was eliminated by Daniel Ward 8–7. Chandra is married to Anuja Thakur, who is also a successful Indian amateur snookers and billiards player.

Partnering with Pankaj Advani, Manan Chandra won the IBSG Snooker Team World Cup in 2018 when they defeated the Pakistan2 team of Muhammad Asif and Babar Masih 3–2.
