= Muhammad Yousaf (snooker player) =

Pakistani snooker player (born 1952)

Personal information
- Born: 1952 (age 73–74) Mumbai, India

Sport
- Country: Pakistan
- Sport: Snooker

Muhammad Yousaf
Medal record

Men's Snooker

Representing Pakistan

IBSF World Masters Championship
Gold medal – first place	2006 Jordan	

Asian Games
Bronze medal – third place	2002 Busan	Team

ACBS Asian Snooker Championship
Gold medal – first place	1998 Pakistan	

IBSF World Snooker Championship
Gold medal – first place	1994 Johannesburg	

Muhammad Yousaf
- Awards: Pride of Performance Award by the Government of Pakistan in 1994

Muhammad Yousaf (Urdu: محمد یوسف, born 1952), also spelled as Mohammed Yousuf, is a Pakistani snooker player. He is the winner of the 1994 IBSF World Snooker Championship, 2006 IBSF World Masters Championship, and 1998 ACBS Asian Snooker Championship.

== Biography ==
Yousaf was born in Mumbai, India and later migrated to Lahore, Punjab, Pakistan. Currently, he is resident in Lahore and coaches young snooker players in one of the largest snooker clubs of Pakistan, Dolphin Snooker Club, situated in Chandni Chowk, Lahore, Pakistan.

== Career ==
In 1994, at the IBSF World Snooker Championship at Johannesburg, he defeated Iceland’s Johannes R. Johanneson 11–9 to become the IBSF World Snooker Champion.

In 2006, he beat Glen Wilkinson of Australia in Amman 5–4 to win the IBSF World Masters Championship in Jordan. He also competed at the 2006 Asian Games in Doha, Qatar.

== Achievements ==
- 2006 IBSF World Masters Champion
- 2002 Asian Champion
- 2000 IBSF World Championship Quarter Final
- 1998 ACBS Asian Snooker Champion
- 1994 IBSF World Snooker Champion
- 1996 Asian champion

== Awards ==
- Pride of Performance Award by the Government of Pakistan in 1994.
