= Brunei at the 2002 Asian Games =

- IOC code: BRU
- NOC: Brunei Darussalam National Olympic Council
- Website: www.bruneiolympic.org (in English)

in Busan
- Medals Ranked 36th: Gold 0 Silver 0 Bronze 1 Total 1

Asian Games appearances (overview)
- 1990; 1994; 1998; 2002; 2006; 2010; 2014; 2018; 2022; 2026

Brunei participated in the 2002 Asian Games held in Busan, South Korea, from September 29 to October 14, 2002. Athletes from Brunei won only one bronze medal, and finished at the 36th spot in the medal table.
