= Yasin Merchant =

Indian snooker player (born 1966)

Personal information
- Born: 17 December 1966 (age 59) Mumbai, India

Sport
- Country: India
- Sport: Snooker
- Professional: 1992–1997
- Highest ranking: 65 (1996/1997)
- Best ranking finish: Last 32 (x2)

Yasin Merchant
Medal record

Men's Snooker

Asian Games
Gold medal – first place	2002 Busan	Doubles
Silver medal – second place	2010 Guangzhou	Team
Bronze medal – third place	2006 Doha	Team

Asian Indoor Games
Bronze medal – third place	2007 Macau	Team

Yasin Merchant (born 17 December 1966) is India's second professional snooker player. The late Omprakesh Agrawal was the first.

Merchant won the National Snooker championships on 3 occasions, in 2001, 2000 and 1991. He was honoured by Khar Gymkhana which has named its snooker hall after him as Yasin Merchant Snooker Hall.

== Career ==
In 2011 he retired from the sport.

== Tournament finals ==
- 2010 Silver medalist Asian Games China
- 2006 Bronze medalist - Indoor Asian games, Macau
- 2007 ACBS Asian Snooker Championship runner-up
- 2002 Asian Games – Snooker Doubles Gold Medal
- 2001 ACBS Asian Champion, Indian Snooker Champion
- 2000 Indian Snooker Champion
- 1991 ACBS Asian Championship runner-up, Indian Snooker Champion
- 1989 ACBS Asian Championship Champion
- 1991 Arjuna Award
- 1991 Shiv Chattrapati Award
- WPBSA World Snooker Coach Grade 2
