= Dongju College =

Private technical college in Busan, South Korea

Coordinates: 35.10486°N 128.99685°E

- 동주대학교
- Type: Private
- Established: 1978; 48 years ago
- Location: Busan, South Korea

- Dongju College
- Hangul: 동주대학교
- Hanja: 東州大學校
- RR: Dongju daehakgyo
- MR: Tongju taehakkyo

Dongju College (Korean: 동주대학교) is a private technical college in Busan, South Korea. About 110 instructors are employed.

== Academics ==
Dongju College offers instruction in the fields of health and social welfare, hotel and tourism management, early childhood education, information technology, and design.

== History ==
The college was opened in 1978 as Dongju Women's Vocational School (동주여자실업전문학교), with 480 students. It became a technical college in 1981.

== Notable people ==
- Song Seon-mi, actress

== See also ==
- List of colleges and universities in South Korea
- Education in South Korea
