= Sepak takraw at the Asian Games =

- Governing bodies: ISTAF (World) / ASTAF (Asia)
- Events: 6 (men: 3; women: 3)

Games
- 1951; 1954; 1958; 1962; 1966; 1970; 1974; 1978; 1982; 1986; 1990; 1994; 1998; 2002; 2006; 2010; 2014; 2018; 2022; 2026
- Medalists

Sepak takraw has been included in the Asian Games since the 1990 Asian Games in Beijing, China.

== Editions ==
Games	Year	Host city	Best nation
XI	1990	Beijing, China	Malaysia
XII	1994	Hiroshima, Japan	Malaysia
XIII	1998	Bangkok, Thailand	Thailand
XIV	2002	Busan, South Korea	Thailand
XV	2006	Doha, Qatar	Thailand
XVI	2010	Guangzhou, China	Thailand
XVII	2014	Incheon, South Korea	Thailand
XVIII	2018	Jakarta–Palembang, Indonesia	Thailand
XIX	2022	Hangzhou, China	Thailand
XX	2026	Aichi–Nagoya, Japan	Thailand

== Events ==
Event	90	94	98	02	06	10	14	18	22	26	Years
Men's circle			X	X							2
Men's doubles					X	X	X				3
Men's regu	X	X	X	X	X	X	X	X	X	X	10
Men's quadrant								X	X	X	3
Men's team doubles								X			1
Men's team regu	X		X	X	X	X	X	X	X	X	9
Women's circle			X	X							2
Women's doubles					X	X	X			X	4
Women's regu			X	X	X	X	X		X		6
Women's quadrant								X	X	X	3
Women's team regu			X	X	X	X	X	X	X	X	8
Total	2	1	6	6	6	6	6	6	6	6	51

== Medal table ==
As of 2026 edition

Rank	Nation	Gold	Silver	Bronze	Total
1	Thailand (THA)	34	9	1	44
2	Malaysia (MAS)	6	12	5	23
3	Myanmar (MYA)	6	8	12	26
4	Vietnam (VIE)	5	6	11	22
5	South Korea (KOR)	1	8	10	19
6	Indonesia (INA)	1	4	15	20
7	Japan (JPN)	1	1	12	14
8	China (CHN)	0	3	10	13
9	Laos (LAO)	0	2	5	7
10	Philippines (PHI)	0	1	3	4
11	Singapore (SGP)	0	0	8	8
12	India (IND)	0	0	4	4
13	Brunei (BRU)	0	0	1	1
Totals (13 entries)		54	54	97	205

== Participating nations ==
Nation	90	94	98	02	06	10	14	18	22	Years
Brunei	X	X	14	12			7			5
Cambodia			X							1
China	12	X	10	10	10	21	25	6	10	9
India					24	24	24	24	16	5
Indonesia		X	11		12	23	23	24	24	7
Iran					4			12		2
Japan	X	X	10	11	18	18	17	18	24	9
Laos	X	X	X				10	22	21	6
Malaysia	12	4	18	11	13	12	20	24	12	9
Myanmar			24	18	15	11	16	23	14	7
Nepal							4	5		2
Pakistan								6		1
Philippines			5	6	7	3		10	12	6
Singapore	10	4	14	12			5	7	6	7
South Korea	X	X	4	24	22	24	24	27	26	9
Thailand	12	4	36	36	30	24	24	27	24	9
Vietnam			12	13	16	12	11	18	12	7
Number of nations	8	9	13	10	11	10	13	15	12	
Number of athletes				153	171	172	210	253	201	
