= List of Asian Games medalists in sepak takraw =

This is the complete list of Asian Games medalists in sepak takraw from 1990 to 2022.

== Men ==
=== Circle ===
Games	Gold	Silver	Bronze
1998 Bangkok	Thailand (THA); Chayan Chinnawong; Surasak Jitchuen; Yothin Jorsao; Ekachai Masuk; Thanakorn Ritsaranchai; Sawat Sangpakdee	Myanmar (MYA); Aung Myo San Myint; Aung Than; Kyaw Min Soe; Kyaw Zay Ya; Phyo Wai Lwin; Than Zaw Oo	Malaysia (MAS); Ghazali Abdul Ghani; Burhanuddin Asiman; Noorhisham Ghani; Mustapha Kamal Hussin; Zahar Hj Ismail; Mahadi Said
2002 Busan	South Korea (KOR); Lee Jun-pyo; Yoo Dong-young; Kim Jong-hun; Lee Myung-chul; Gwak Young-duk; Yoon Ju-hyung	Thailand (THA); Yothin Jorsao; Sawat Sangpakdee; Ekachai Masuk; Saharat Uonumpai; Surasak Jitchuen; Thanakorn Ritsaranchai	Japan (JPN); Yoshitaka Iida; Kenji Tajiri; Susumu Teramoto; Fumio Arashi; Junya Yano
2002 Busan	South Korea (KOR); Lee Jun-pyo; Yoo Dong-young; Kim Jong-hun; Lee Myung-chul; Gwak Young-duk; Yoon Ju-hyung	Thailand (THA); Yothin Jorsao; Sawat Sangpakdee; Ekachai Masuk; Saharat Uonumpai; Surasak Jitchuen; Thanakorn Ritsaranchai	Myanmar (MYA); Thein Zaw Min; Than Zaw Oo; Kyaw Zay Ya; Kyaw Min Soe; Aung Myo San Myint; Myint Swe

=== Doubles ===
Games	Gold	Silver	Bronze
2006 Doha	Thailand (THA); Rawat Parbchompoo; Purich Pansira; Rattikorn Pealun	Myanmar (MYA); Zaw Latt; Aung Cho Myint; Si Thu Lin	Indonesia (INA); Yudi Purnomo; Jusri Pakke; Husni Uba
2006 Doha	Thailand (THA); Rawat Parbchompoo; Purich Pansira; Rattikorn Pealun	Myanmar (MYA); Zaw Latt; Aung Cho Myint; Si Thu Lin	Malaysia (MAS); Azman Nasruddin; Saiful Nizam Mohd; Saufi Salleh
2010 Guangzhou	Myanmar (MYA); Si Thu Lin; Zaw Latt; Zaw Zaw Aung	South Korea (KOR); Jeong Won-deok; Lee Gyu-nam; Lee Jun-ho	Indonesia (INA); Husni Uba; Jusri Pakke; Yudi Purnomo
2010 Guangzhou	Myanmar (MYA); Si Thu Lin; Zaw Latt; Zaw Zaw Aung	South Korea (KOR); Jeong Won-deok; Lee Gyu-nam; Lee Jun-ho	Japan (JPN); Yuichi Matsuda; Susumu Teramoto; Takeshi Terashima
2014 Incheon	Myanmar (MYA); Zaw Zaw Aung; Zaw Latt; Wai Lin Aung	South Korea (KOR); Kim Young-man; Im An-soo; Jeong Won-deok	Japan (JPN); Susumu Teramoto; Seiya Takano; Takeshi Terashima
2014 Incheon	Myanmar (MYA); Zaw Zaw Aung; Zaw Latt; Wai Lin Aung	South Korea (KOR); Kim Young-man; Im An-soo; Jeong Won-deok	Singapore (SIN); Farhan Amran; Eddy Nor Shafiq Sahari; Hafiz Nor Izam Jaafar

=== Regu ===
Games	Gold	Silver	Bronze
1990 Beijing	Malaysia (MAL); Noor Rani Adnan; Rehan Mohamad Din; Nordin Sabarudin; Malik Samsudin	Thailand (THA); Pakdee Dangwatanapaibul; Chucheep Kongmeechon; Kriengkrai Mutalai; Surat Na Chiengmai	Singapore (SIN); Eddie Abdul Kadir; Rafi Abdul Majid; Nur Hisham Adam; Padzli Othman
1994 Hiroshima	Malaysia (MAS); Iskandar Arshad; Ahmad Jais Baharun; Malik Samsudin; Zabidi Shariff	Thailand (THA); Narongchai Kaewnopparat; Udomsak Kiatchupipat; Kampol Tassit; Tawit Wongkluen	Singapore (SIN); Nur Hisham Adam; Mohd Fami Mohamed; Mislan Munjari; Ahmad Yasin
1998 Bangkok	Thailand (THA); Kittipoom Namsook; Suriyan Peachan; Poonsak Permsap; Suebsak Phunsueb	Malaysia (MAS); Rommi Suhendra Norsal; Kaharuddin Shamsuddin; Zabidi Shariff; Suhaimi Yusof	Brunei (BRU)
1998 Bangkok	Thailand (THA); Kittipoom Namsook; Suriyan Peachan; Poonsak Permsap; Suebsak Phunsueb	Malaysia (MAS); Rommi Suhendra Norsal; Kaharuddin Shamsuddin; Zabidi Shariff; Suhaimi Yusof	Myanmar (MYA)
2002 Busan	Thailand (THA); Suebsak Phunsueb; Sarawut Inlek; Pornchai Kaokaew; Worapot Thongsai; Poonsak Permsap	Myanmar (MYA); Kyaw Min Soe; Than Zaw Oo; Aung Myo San Myint; Aung Hein; Maung Maung	Malaysia (MAS); Fauzi Ghadzali; Suhaimi Mat Salim; Noor Ariffin Pawanteh; Azman Nasruddin; Zulkarnain Arif
2002 Busan	Thailand (THA); Suebsak Phunsueb; Sarawut Inlek; Pornchai Kaokaew; Worapot Thongsai; Poonsak Permsap	Myanmar (MYA); Kyaw Min Soe; Than Zaw Oo; Aung Myo San Myint; Aung Hein; Maung Maung	Singapore (SIN); Nur Hisham Adam; Shamsaimon Sabtu; Sharil Abdul Shukor; Eddie Abdul Kadir; Mohd Fami Mohamed
2006 Doha	Thailand (THA); Suebsak Phunsueb; Panomporn Aiemsaard; Pornchai Kaokaew; Somporn Jaisinghol; Singha Somsakul	Malaysia (MAS); Normanizam Ahmad; Sulaiman Salleh; Futra Abd Ghani; Azlan Abdul Mubin; Zulkarnain Arif	Indonesia (INA); Yudi Purnomo; Muhammad Nasrum; Jusri Pakke; Husni Uba; Edy Suwarno
2006 Doha	Thailand (THA); Suebsak Phunsueb; Panomporn Aiemsaard; Pornchai Kaokaew; Somporn Jaisinghol; Singha Somsakul	Malaysia (MAS); Normanizam Ahmad; Sulaiman Salleh; Futra Abd Ghani; Azlan Abdul Mubin; Zulkarnain Arif	Myanmar (MYA); Yazar Tun; Zaw Latt; Oaka Soe; Aung Cho Myint; Zaw Zaw Aung
2010 Guangzhou	Thailand (THA); Anuwat Chaichana; Kriangkrai Kaewmian; Pornchai Kaokaew; Wirawut Nanongkhai; Pattarapong Yupadee	Malaysia (MAS); Futra Abd Ghani; Noor Azman Abd Hamid; Farhan Adam; Normanizam Ahmad; Nor Shahruddin Mad Ghani	China (CHN); Ge Yusheng; Xu Mingchi; Yang Jiapeng; Zhang Linye; Zhou Haiyang
2010 Guangzhou	Thailand (THA); Anuwat Chaichana; Kriangkrai Kaewmian; Pornchai Kaokaew; Wirawut Nanongkhai; Pattarapong Yupadee	Malaysia (MAS); Futra Abd Ghani; Noor Azman Abd Hamid; Farhan Adam; Normanizam Ahmad; Nor Shahruddin Mad Ghani	Myanmar (MYA); Aung Cho Myint; Aung Myo Swe; Si Thu Lin; Zaw Latt; Zaw Zaw Aung
2014 Incheon	Thailand (THA); Anuwat Chaichana; Siriwat Sakha; Pornchai Kaokaew; Pattarapong Yupadee; Sittipong Khamchan	South Korea (KOR); Park Hyeon-geun; Shim Jae-chul; Kim Young-man; Im An-soo; Jeong Won-deok	Malaysia (MAS); Ahmad Aizat Nor Azmi; Syazreenqamar Salehan; Fadzli Roslan; Zamree Dahan; Syahir Rosdi
2014 Incheon	Thailand (THA); Anuwat Chaichana; Siriwat Sakha; Pornchai Kaokaew; Pattarapong Yupadee; Sittipong Khamchan	South Korea (KOR); Park Hyeon-geun; Shim Jae-chul; Kim Young-man; Im An-soo; Jeong Won-deok	Myanmar (MYA); Htoo Aung Kyaw; Zaw Zaw Aung; Naing Lin Aung; Aung Pyae Tun; Kyaw Soe Win
2018 Jakarta–Palembang	Malaysia (MAS); Azlan Alias; Zulkifli Abd Razak; Norhaffizi Abd Razak; Farhan Adam; Syahir Rosdi	Indonesia (INA); Mohamad Herson Saipul; Muhammad Hardiansyah Muliang; Nofrizal; Abdul Halim Radjiu; Victoria Eka Prasetyo	South Korea (KOR); Lim Tae-gyun; Lee Jun-ho; Kim Young-man; Shim Jae-chul; Jeong Won-deok
2018 Jakarta–Palembang	Malaysia (MAS); Azlan Alias; Zulkifli Abd Razak; Norhaffizi Abd Razak; Farhan Adam; Syahir Rosdi	Indonesia (INA); Mohamad Herson Saipul; Muhammad Hardiansyah Muliang; Nofrizal; Abdul Halim Radjiu; Victoria Eka Prasetyo	Singapore (SGP); Afif Safiee; Farhan Aman; Mohd Asri Aron; Asfandi Ja'al; Farhan Amran
2022 Hangzhou	Thailand (THA); Siriwat Sakha; Pattarapong Yupadee; Sittipong Khamchan; Varayut Jantarasena; Pichet Pansan	Malaysia (MAS); Zarif Marican; Azlan Alias; Afifuddin Razali; Amirul Zazwan Amir; Syahir Rosdi	Philippines (PHI); Jason Huerte; Mark Joseph Gonzales; Rheyjey Ortouste; Ronsited Gabayeron; Jom Lerry Rafael
2022 Hangzhou	Thailand (THA); Siriwat Sakha; Pattarapong Yupadee; Sittipong Khamchan; Varayut Jantarasena; Pichet Pansan	Malaysia (MAS); Zarif Marican; Azlan Alias; Afifuddin Razali; Amirul Zazwan Amir; Syahir Rosdi	Vietnam (VIE); Nguyễn Hoàng Lân; Ngô Thành Long; Huỳnh Ngọc Sang; Đầu Văn Hoàng; Vương Minh Châu

=== Quadrant ===
Games	Gold	Silver	Bronze
2018 Jakarta–Palembang	Indonesia (INA); Muhammad Hardiansyah Muliang; Nofrizal; Saiful Rijal; Husni Uba; Rizky Abdul Rahman Pago; Abdul Halim Radjiu	Japan (JPN); Yuki Sato; Seiya Takano; Takeshi Terashima; Toshitaka Naito; Hirokazu Kobayashi; Masanori Hayashi	Singapore (SGP); Mohd Al-Haj Kasmanani; Afif Safiee; Farhan Aman; Khairilshamy Shamsudin; Mohd Asri Aron; Farhan Amran
2018 Jakarta–Palembang	Indonesia (INA); Muhammad Hardiansyah Muliang; Nofrizal; Saiful Rijal; Husni Uba; Rizky Abdul Rahman Pago; Abdul Halim Radjiu	Japan (JPN); Yuki Sato; Seiya Takano; Takeshi Terashima; Toshitaka Naito; Hirokazu Kobayashi; Masanori Hayashi	Vietnam (VIE); Đỗ Mạnh Tuấn; Nguyễn Quốc Anh; Nguyễn Hoàng Lân; Nguyễn Hữu Danh; Đầu Văn Hoàng; Lê Văn Nghĩa
2022 Hangzhou	Myanmar (MYA); Thant Zin Oo; Aung Khant Thu; Zin Min Oo; Thant Zin Tun; Zin Ko Ko; Shein Wunna Zaw	Indonesia (INA); Diky Apriyadi; Muhammad Hardiansyah Muliang; Saiful Rijal; Muhammad Hafidz; Rusdi; Abdul Halim Radjiu	Japan (JPN); Yuki Sato; Seiya Takano; Ryota Haruhara; Toshitaka Naito; Wataru Narawa; Yota Ichikawa
2022 Hangzhou	Myanmar (MYA); Thant Zin Oo; Aung Khant Thu; Zin Min Oo; Thant Zin Tun; Zin Ko Ko; Shein Wunna Zaw	Indonesia (INA); Diky Apriyadi; Muhammad Hardiansyah Muliang; Saiful Rijal; Muhammad Hafidz; Rusdi; Abdul Halim Radjiu	Philippines (PHI); Jason Huerte; Mark Joseph Gonzales; Rheyjey Ortouste; Ronsited Gabayeron; Jom Lerry Rafael; Vince Alyson Torno

=== Team doubles ===
Games	Gold	Silver	Bronze
2018 Jakarta–Palembang	Thailand (THA); Anuwat Chaichana; Seksan Tubtong; Pornchai Kaokaew; Wichan Temkort; Pattarapong Yupadee; Assadin Wongyota; Rachan Viphan; Jirasak Pakbuangoen; Suriyon Koonpimon	Laos (LAO); Yothin Sombatphouthone; Chanthalak Chanthavong; Xaibandith Thadanabouth; Noum Souvannalith; Phitthasanh Bounpaseuth; Kantana Nanthisen; Laksanaxay Bounphaivanh; Kongsy Yang; Phonsavanh Keoviseth	Indonesia (INA); Mohamad Herson Saipul; Muhammad Hardiansyah Muliang; Rezki Yusuf Djaina; Nofrizal; Saiful Rijal; Husni Uba; Hendra Pago; Rizky Abdul Rahman Pago; Abdul Halim Radjiu
2018 Jakarta–Palembang	Thailand (THA); Anuwat Chaichana; Seksan Tubtong; Pornchai Kaokaew; Wichan Temkort; Pattarapong Yupadee; Assadin Wongyota; Rachan Viphan; Jirasak Pakbuangoen; Suriyon Koonpimon	Laos (LAO); Yothin Sombatphouthone; Chanthalak Chanthavong; Xaibandith Thadanabouth; Noum Souvannalith; Phitthasanh Bounpaseuth; Kantana Nanthisen; Laksanaxay Bounphaivanh; Kongsy Yang; Phonsavanh Keoviseth	Japan (JPN); Yuki Sato; Seiya Takano; Takeshi Terashima; Toshitaka Naito; Ryo Masuda; Tsubasa Sato; Masahiro Yamada; Hirokazu Kobayashi; Masanori Hayashi

=== Team regu ===
Games	Gold	Silver	Bronze
1990 Beijing	Malaysia (MAL); Rosli Abdul Rahman; Mohd Noor Abdullah; Noor Rani Adnan; Ahmad Jais Baharun; Rehan Mohamad Din; Shaari Hashim; Raziman Hassan; Baharum Jahar; Engku Halim Ku Musa; Nordin Sabarudin; Malik Samsudin; Suhaimi Yusof	Thailand (THA); Wisut Boonsuya; Pakdee Dangwatanapaibul; Somsak Duangmuang; Narongchai Kaewnopparat; Ittiphol Komchaisak; Chucheep Kongmeechon; Chairat Kreungdi; Paisal Maihunla; Kriengkrai Mutalai; Surat Na Chiengmai; Wirat Pomuang; Khamnuan Sonnanon	Singapore (SIN); Eddie Abdul Kadir; Rafi Abdul Majid; Nur Hisham Adam; Raffi Buang; Hairulnizam Hamzah; Shaharuddin Jumani; Zulkefle Khamis; Mohd Fami Mohamed; Hassan Nanang; Padzli Othman
1998 Bangkok	Thailand (THA); Worapong Jodpimay; Panuchit Kaewnoi; Paisal Maihunla; Kriengkrai Mutalai; Kittipoom Namsook; Suriyan Peachan; Poonsak Permsap; Dumrong Phakaedum; Suebsak Phunsueb; Supap Rakwongrit; Kampol Tassit; Worapot Thongsai	Malaysia (MAS); Awaluddin Abdul Hamid; Suhaimi Abdul Rahman; Iskandar Arshad; Jamry Ederis; Nasir Ismail; Khairulnizam Jidin; Ahmad Rafi Noh; Rommi Suhendra Norsal; Kaharuddin Shamsuddin; Zabidi Shariff; Suhaimi Yusof; Ahmad Ezzat Zaki	Myanmar (MYA); Aung Hein; Aung Myo San Myint; Aung Than; Kyaw Min Soe; Kyaw Zay Ya; Maung Maung; Min Min Naing; Phyo Wai Lwin; San Tun Oo; Saw Tin Moe; Than Zaw Oo; Zin Tun Win
1998 Bangkok	Thailand (THA); Worapong Jodpimay; Panuchit Kaewnoi; Paisal Maihunla; Kriengkrai Mutalai; Kittipoom Namsook; Suriyan Peachan; Poonsak Permsap; Dumrong Phakaedum; Suebsak Phunsueb; Supap Rakwongrit; Kampol Tassit; Worapot Thongsai	Malaysia (MAS); Awaluddin Abdul Hamid; Suhaimi Abdul Rahman; Iskandar Arshad; Jamry Ederis; Nasir Ismail; Khairulnizam Jidin; Ahmad Rafi Noh; Rommi Suhendra Norsal; Kaharuddin Shamsuddin; Zabidi Shariff; Suhaimi Yusof; Ahmad Ezzat Zaki	Singapore (SIN); Eddie Abdul Kadir; Herwan Abdul Wahid; Mohd Nazri Abdullah; Nur Hisham Adam; Raffi Buang; Raimon Budin; Irwan Kamis; Mohd Fami Mohamed; Mislan Munjari; Shamon Sabtu; Shamsaimon Sabtu; Ahmad Yasin
2002 Busan	Thailand (THA); Sarawut Inlek; Pornchai Kaokaew; Nattawut Panomai; Rawat Parbchompoo; Suriyan Peachan; Poonsak Permsap; Suebsak Phunsueb; Prasert Pongpung; Prawet Saejung; Chart Singrang; Kamphol Thassit; Worapot Thongsai	Malaysia (MAS); Fauzi Ghadzali; Suhaimi Mat Salim; Ahmad Ezzat Zaki; Zulkarnain Arif; Rukman Mustapha; Azman Nasruddin; Noor Ariffin Pawanteh; Zabidi Shariff; Suhaimi Yusof	South Korea (KOR); Gwak Young-duk; Jeong Sung-hwa; Jung Yeon-hong; Kim Dae-hee; Kim Hyung-il; Kim Jae-min; Kim Jong-hun; Kim Mu-jin; Lee Jun-pyo; Lee Myung-chul; Yoo Dong-young; Yoon Ju-hyung
2002 Busan	Thailand (THA); Sarawut Inlek; Pornchai Kaokaew; Nattawut Panomai; Rawat Parbchompoo; Suriyan Peachan; Poonsak Permsap; Suebsak Phunsueb; Prasert Pongpung; Prawet Saejung; Chart Singrang; Kamphol Thassit; Worapot Thongsai	Malaysia (MAS); Fauzi Ghadzali; Suhaimi Mat Salim; Ahmad Ezzat Zaki; Zulkarnain Arif; Rukman Mustapha; Azman Nasruddin; Noor Ariffin Pawanteh; Zabidi Shariff; Suhaimi Yusof	Myanmar (MYA); Aung Hein; Aung Myo San Myint; Kyaw Min Soe; Kyaw Zay Ya; Maung Maung; Myint Swe; Than Zaw Oo; Thaung Nyunt; Thein Zaw Min
2006 Doha	Thailand (THA); Sakol Jandoung; Suebsak Phunsueb; Panomporn Aiemsaard; Sarawut Inlek; Pornchai Kaokaew; Rangsirod Sirisamutsarn; Worapot Thongsai; Terdsak Pilae; Somporn Jaisinghol; Suriyan Peachan; Singha Somsakul; Prasert Pongpung	Malaysia (MAS); Normanizam Ahmad; Sulaiman Salleh; Saifudin Hussin; Ahmad Sufi Hashim; Futra Abd Ghani; Azlan Abdul Mubin; Azman Nasruddin; Noor Ariffin Pawanteh; Zulhafizazudin Rosslan; Zulkarnain Arif; Rukman Mustapha; Saufi Salleh	Indonesia (INA); Abrian Sihab Aldilatama; Suko Hartono; Yudi Purnomo; Wisnu Dwi Suhantoro; Muhammad Nasrum; Triaji; Jusri Pakke; Husni Uba; Muhammad Suardi; Edy Suwarno; Nurkholis; Stephanus Sampe
2006 Doha	Thailand (THA); Sakol Jandoung; Suebsak Phunsueb; Panomporn Aiemsaard; Sarawut Inlek; Pornchai Kaokaew; Rangsirod Sirisamutsarn; Worapot Thongsai; Terdsak Pilae; Somporn Jaisinghol; Suriyan Peachan; Singha Somsakul; Prasert Pongpung	Malaysia (MAS); Normanizam Ahmad; Sulaiman Salleh; Saifudin Hussin; Ahmad Sufi Hashim; Futra Abd Ghani; Azlan Abdul Mubin; Azman Nasruddin; Noor Ariffin Pawanteh; Zulhafizazudin Rosslan; Zulkarnain Arif; Rukman Mustapha; Saufi Salleh	Myanmar (MYA); Thein Zaw Min; Yazar Tun; Zaw Latt; Oaka Soe; Zaw Zaw Aung; Aung Cho Myint; Sithu Linn; Aung Myo Swe; Kyaw Thi Ha Oo; Zaw Zaw Aung; Tun Tun Naing
2010 Guangzhou	Thailand (THA); Anuwat Chaichana; Somporn Jaisinghol; Kriangkrai Kaewmian; Pornchai Kaokaew; Supachai Maneenat; Wirawut Nanongkhai; Suriyan Peachan; Suebsak Phunsueb; Siriwat Sakha; Singha Somsakul; Kritsana Tanakorn; Pattarapong Yupadee	Malaysia (MAS); Futra Abd Ghani; Noor Azman Abd Hamid; Farhan Adam; Normanizam Ahmad; Syazwan Husin; Mohd Helmi Ismail; Nor Shahruddin Mad Ghani; Mohd Hafizie Manap; Zulkarnain Arif; Ahmad Sufi Hashim; Azman Nasruddin; Ariff Ramli	Japan (JPN); Masanori Hayashi; Yoshitaka Iida; Yuichi Matsuda; Jun Motohashi; Tomoyuki Nakatsuka; Seiya Takano; Susumu Teramoto; Takeshi Terashima; Masahiro Yamada
2010 Guangzhou	Thailand (THA); Anuwat Chaichana; Somporn Jaisinghol; Kriangkrai Kaewmian; Pornchai Kaokaew; Supachai Maneenat; Wirawut Nanongkhai; Suriyan Peachan; Suebsak Phunsueb; Siriwat Sakha; Singha Somsakul; Kritsana Tanakorn; Pattarapong Yupadee	Malaysia (MAS); Futra Abd Ghani; Noor Azman Abd Hamid; Farhan Adam; Normanizam Ahmad; Syazwan Husin; Mohd Helmi Ismail; Nor Shahruddin Mad Ghani; Mohd Hafizie Manap; Zulkarnain Arif; Ahmad Sufi Hashim; Azman Nasruddin; Ariff Ramli	South Korea (KOR); Go Jae-uk; Im An-soo; Jeong Won-deok; Kim Young-man; Kwon Hyuk-jin; Lee Gyu-nam; Lee Jun-ho; Lee Myung-jung; Park Hyeon-geun; Sin Seung-tae; Woo Gyeong-han; Yoo Dong-young
2014 Incheon	Thailand (THA); Anuwat Chaichana; Siriwat Sakha; Kritsana Tanakorn; Assadin Wongyota; Pornchai Kaokaew; Sahachat Sakhoncharoen; Pattarapong Yupadee; Thanawat Chumsena; Somporn Jaisinghol; Suriyan Peachan; Supachai Maneenat; Sittipong Khamchan	South Korea (KOR); Park Hyeon-geun; Woo Gyeong-han; Jeon Young-man; Kim Hyun-jun; Shim Jae-chul; Kim Young-man; Go Jae-uk; Sin Seung-tae; Im An-soo; Shin Choo-kwang; Jeong Won-deok; Hong Seung-hyun	Indonesia (INA); Syamsul Hadi; Syamsul Akmal; Yovi Hendra Utama; Muhammad Ruswan Wajib; Andi Paturay; Firmansyah; Saiful Rijal; Husni Uba; Nofrizal; Hendra Pago; Abrian Sihab Aldilatama; Victoria Eka Prasetyo
2014 Incheon	Thailand (THA); Anuwat Chaichana; Siriwat Sakha; Kritsana Tanakorn; Assadin Wongyota; Pornchai Kaokaew; Sahachat Sakhoncharoen; Pattarapong Yupadee; Thanawat Chumsena; Somporn Jaisinghol; Suriyan Peachan; Supachai Maneenat; Sittipong Khamchan	South Korea (KOR); Park Hyeon-geun; Woo Gyeong-han; Jeon Young-man; Kim Hyun-jun; Shim Jae-chul; Kim Young-man; Go Jae-uk; Sin Seung-tae; Im An-soo; Shin Choo-kwang; Jeong Won-deok; Hong Seung-hyun	Malaysia (MAS); Ahmad Aizat Nor Azmi; Izurin Refin; Syazreenqamar Salehan; Mohd Helmi Ismail; Fadzli Roslan; Kamal Alfiza Shafie; Amirul Zazwan Amir; Muqlis Borhan; Zuleffendi Sumari; Zamree Dahan; Syahir Rosdi; Idham Sulaiman
2018 Jakarta–Palembang	Thailand (THA); Anuwat Chaichana; Siriwat Sakha; Thawisak Thongsai; Pornchai Kaokaew; Pattarapong Yupadee; Assadin Wongyota; Thanawat Chumsena; Rachan Viphan; Sittipong Khamchan; Jirasak Pakbuangoen; Kritsanapong Nontakote; Jantarit Khukaeo	Malaysia (MAS); Said Ezwan Said De; Noraizat Mohd Nordin; Syazreenqamar Salehan; Azlan Alias; Afifuddin Razali; Kamal Ishak; Zulkifli Abd Razak; Norhaffizi Abd Razak; Farhan Adam; Hairul Hazizi Haidzir; Aidil Aiman Azwawi; Syahir Rosdi	Indonesia (INA); Mohamad Herson Saipul; Syamsul Akmal; Muhammad Hardiansyah Muliang; Rezki Yusuf Djaina; Andi Try Sandi Saputra; Nofrizal; Saiful Rijal; Husni Uba; Hendra Pago; Rizky Abdul Rahman Pago; Abdul Halim Radjiu; Victoria Eka Prasetyo
2018 Jakarta–Palembang	Thailand (THA); Anuwat Chaichana; Siriwat Sakha; Thawisak Thongsai; Pornchai Kaokaew; Pattarapong Yupadee; Assadin Wongyota; Thanawat Chumsena; Rachan Viphan; Sittipong Khamchan; Jirasak Pakbuangoen; Kritsanapong Nontakote; Jantarit Khukaeo	Malaysia (MAS); Said Ezwan Said De; Noraizat Mohd Nordin; Syazreenqamar Salehan; Azlan Alias; Afifuddin Razali; Kamal Ishak; Zulkifli Abd Razak; Norhaffizi Abd Razak; Farhan Adam; Hairul Hazizi Haidzir; Aidil Aiman Azwawi; Syahir Rosdi	India (IND); Niken Singh Khangembam; Sanjeck Singh Waikhom; Dheeraj Kumar; Jotin Singh Ngathem; Lalit Kumar; Sandeep Kumar; Seitaram Singh Thokchom; Harish Kumar; Malemnganba Sorokhaibam; Gurumayum Jiteshor Sharma; Henary Singh Wahengbam; Akash Yumnam
2022 Hangzhou	Thailand (THA); Siriwat Sakha; Thawisak Thongsai; Pattarapong Yupadee; Rachan Viphan; Pornthep Tinbangbon; Sittipong Khamchan; Varayut Jantarasena; Wichan Temkort; Kritsanapong Nontakote; Pichet Pansan; Tanaphon Sapyen; Marukin Phanmakon	Malaysia (MAS); Zarif Marican; Noraizat Mohd Nordin; Azlan Alias; Afifuddin Razali; Amirul Zazwan Amir; Aidil Aiman Azwawi; Hairul Hazizi Haidzir; Farhan Adam; Khairol Zaman Hamir Akhbar; Haziq Hairul Nizam; Syahir Rosdi; Zaim Razali	South Korea (KOR); Lim Tae-gyun; Lee Jun-uk; Lee Min-ju; Seo Seung-beom; Kim Jung-man; Kim Hyun-soo; Im An-soo; Seonwoo Young-su; Jeong Ha-sung; Kim Young-cheol; Lee Woo-jin; Lee Jae-seong
2022 Hangzhou	Thailand (THA); Siriwat Sakha; Thawisak Thongsai; Pattarapong Yupadee; Rachan Viphan; Pornthep Tinbangbon; Sittipong Khamchan; Varayut Jantarasena; Wichan Temkort; Kritsanapong Nontakote; Pichet Pansan; Tanaphon Sapyen; Marukin Phanmakon	Malaysia (MAS); Zarif Marican; Noraizat Mohd Nordin; Azlan Alias; Afifuddin Razali; Amirul Zazwan Amir; Aidil Aiman Azwawi; Hairul Hazizi Haidzir; Farhan Adam; Khairol Zaman Hamir Akhbar; Haziq Hairul Nizam; Syahir Rosdi; Zaim Razali	Laos (LAO); Daophachanh Moungsin; Sommanyvanh Phakonekham; Daovy Xanavongxay; Phitthasanh Bounpaseuth; Noum Souvannalith; Po Masopha; Yothin Sombatphouthone; Kantana Nanthisen; Phonesavanh Phimmachak; Adong Phoumisin; Soukkaserm Chanthahieng

== Women ==
=== Circle ===
Games	Gold	Silver	Bronze
1998 Bangkok	Thailand (THA); Nittiya Boonjunag; Kobkul Chinchaiyaphom; Lumpiang Pumpim; Buaphan Sawatdipon; Wanwipa Seelahoi; Warn Sochaiyan	Myanmar (MYA); Mar Mar Win; Moe Moe Lwin; Nu Nu Yin; San San Htay; San San Htay; Tin Tin Htwe	Vietnam (VIE); Đặng Thị Ngọc; Lê Thị Hồng Thơm; Lưu Thị Thanh; Nguyễn Thị Thúy Vinh; Trần Nguyễn Anh Phương; Trần Thị Vui
2002 Busan	Thailand (THA); Lampieng Poompin; Buaphan Sawatdipon; Wanwipa Seelahoi; Kobkul Chinchaiyaphum; Buarian Faisong; Warn Sochaiyan	Myanmar (MYA); Naing Naing Win; San San Htay; Mar Mar Win; San San Htay; Nu Nu Yin; Moe Moe Lwin	South Korea (KOR); Lee Myung-eun; Kim Mi-hyeon; Kim Mi-jin; Na Yu-mi; Kim Sin-jung; Park Jeong-hyeon
2002 Busan	Thailand (THA); Lampieng Poompin; Buaphan Sawatdipon; Wanwipa Seelahoi; Kobkul Chinchaiyaphum; Buarian Faisong; Warn Sochaiyan	Myanmar (MYA); Naing Naing Win; San San Htay; Mar Mar Win; San San Htay; Nu Nu Yin; Moe Moe Lwin	Vietnam (VIE); Nguyễn Đức Thu Hiền; Lưu Thị Thanh; Vũ Hải Anh; Trần Nguyễn Anh Phương; Lê Thị Hồng Thơm; Mai Tuyết Hoa

=== Doubles ===
Games	Gold	Silver	Bronze
2006 Doha	Vietnam (VIE); Nguyễn Đức Thu Hiền; Lưu Thị Thanh; Nguyễn Hải Thảo	Myanmar (MYA); Kyu Kyu Thin; May Zin Phyoe; Khin Aye Maw	China (CHN); Sun Xiaodan; Wang Xiaohua; Wang Jianshuang
2006 Doha	Vietnam (VIE); Nguyễn Đức Thu Hiền; Lưu Thị Thanh; Nguyễn Hải Thảo	Myanmar (MYA); Kyu Kyu Thin; May Zin Phyoe; Khin Aye Maw	Japan (JPN); Sawa Aoki; Chiharu Oku; Mari Nakagawa
2010 Guangzhou	Myanmar (MYA); Kyu Kyu Thin; May Zin Phyoe; Phyu Phyu Than	China (CHN); Cui Yonghui; Sun Xiaodan; Wang Xiaohua	Japan (JPN); Sawa Aoki; Yukie Sato; Chiharu Yano
2010 Guangzhou	Myanmar (MYA); Kyu Kyu Thin; May Zin Phyoe; Phyu Phyu Than	China (CHN); Cui Yonghui; Sun Xiaodan; Wang Xiaohua	South Korea (KOR); Ahn Soon-ok; Kim Mi-jin; Park Keum-duk
2014 Incheon	Myanmar (MYA); Kyu Kyu Thin; Khin Hnin Wai; Phyu Phyu Than	Laos (LAO); Nouandam Volabouth; Koy Xayavong; Sonsavan Keosouliya	Japan (JPN); Yukie Sato; Sawa Aoki; Chiharu Yano
2014 Incheon	Myanmar (MYA); Kyu Kyu Thin; Khin Hnin Wai; Phyu Phyu Than	Laos (LAO); Nouandam Volabouth; Koy Xayavong; Sonsavan Keosouliya	Vietnam (VIE); Nguyễn Thị Quyên; Lê Thị Tâm; Dương Thị Xuyên

=== Regu ===
Games	Gold	Silver	Bronze
1998 Bangkok	Myanmar (MYA); Khin Cho Latt; Mar Mar Win; San San Htay; San San Htay	Vietnam (VIE); Hoàng Thị Thái Xuân; Lưu Thị Thanh; Nguyễn Thị Thúy Vinh; Trần Thị Vui	China (CHN); Sun Xiaodan; Wang Xiaohua; Yu Ying; Zhou Ronghong
1998 Bangkok	Myanmar (MYA); Khin Cho Latt; Mar Mar Win; San San Htay; San San Htay	Vietnam (VIE); Hoàng Thị Thái Xuân; Lưu Thị Thanh; Nguyễn Thị Thúy Vinh; Trần Thị Vui	Thailand (THA); Nongluck Darachoo; Puangnoi Jenkij; Yupayong Namboonla; Arun Sirikhan
2002 Busan	Thailand (THA); Nitinadda Kaewkamsai; Kanjana Yanyajan; Tidawan Daosakul; Pinporn Klongbungkar; Sahattiya Faksra	China (CHN); Zhou Ronghong; Sun Xiaodan; Bai Jie; Wang Xiaohua; Hu Zhengyi	Japan (JPN); Keiko Ishikawa; Sawa Aoki; Chiharu Oku; Masumi Aikawa; Mari Nakagawa
2002 Busan	Thailand (THA); Nitinadda Kaewkamsai; Kanjana Yanyajan; Tidawan Daosakul; Pinporn Klongbungkar; Sahattiya Faksra	China (CHN); Zhou Ronghong; Sun Xiaodan; Bai Jie; Wang Xiaohua; Hu Zhengyi	Vietnam (VIE); Lưu Thị Thanh; Hoàng Thị Thái Xuân; Trần Thị Vui; Lê Thị Hồng Thơm; Lương Thị Việt Anh
2006 Doha	Thailand (THA); Areerat Takan; Nitinadda Kaewkamsai; Tidawan Daosakul; Pinporn Klongbungkar; Phutsadi Suancharun	Vietnam (VIE); Lưu Thị Thanh; Nguyễn Thị Thúy An; Nguyễn Thị Bích Thủy; Nguyễn Thịnh Thu Ba; Nguyễn Hải Thảo	China (CHN); Zhou Ronghong; Sun Xiaodan; Wang Xiaohua; Wang Jianshuang; Lu Jiajia
2006 Doha	Thailand (THA); Areerat Takan; Nitinadda Kaewkamsai; Tidawan Daosakul; Pinporn Klongbungkar; Phutsadi Suancharun	Vietnam (VIE); Lưu Thị Thanh; Nguyễn Thị Thúy An; Nguyễn Thị Bích Thủy; Nguyễn Thịnh Thu Ba; Nguyễn Hải Thảo	Myanmar (MYA); Kyu Kyu Thin; May Zin Phyoe; Naing Naing Win; Khin Aye Maw
2010 Guangzhou	Thailand (THA); Tidawan Daosakul; Sunthari Rupsung; Phikun Seedam; Nareerat Takan; Daranee Wongcharern	Vietnam (VIE); Lại Thị Huyền Trang; Lưu Thị Thanh; Nguyễn Hải Thảo; Nguyễn Thị Bích Thủy; Nguyễn Thịnh Thu Ba	China (CHN); Cui Yonghui; Gu Xihui; Song Cheng; Wang Xiaohua; Zhou Ronghong
2010 Guangzhou	Thailand (THA); Tidawan Daosakul; Sunthari Rupsung; Phikun Seedam; Nareerat Takan; Daranee Wongcharern	Vietnam (VIE); Lại Thị Huyền Trang; Lưu Thị Thanh; Nguyễn Hải Thảo; Nguyễn Thị Bích Thủy; Nguyễn Thịnh Thu Ba	Myanmar (MYA); Ei Thin Zar; Kay Zin Htut; Kyu Kyu Thin; May Zin Phyoe; Naing Naing Win
2014 Incheon	Thailand (THA); Masaya Duangsri; Sunthari Rupsung; Fueangfa Praphatsarang; Wanwisa Jankaen; Payom Srihongsa	South Korea (KOR); Park Seon-ju; Kim I-seul; Lee Min-ju; Lee Jin-hee; Sim Su-yeon	China (CHN); Lao Tianxue; Zhang Yanan; Liu Xiaofang; Song Cheng; Cui Yonghui
2014 Incheon	Thailand (THA); Masaya Duangsri; Sunthari Rupsung; Fueangfa Praphatsarang; Wanwisa Jankaen; Payom Srihongsa	South Korea (KOR); Park Seon-ju; Kim I-seul; Lee Min-ju; Lee Jin-hee; Sim Su-yeon	Indonesia (INA); Leni; Florensia Cristy; Lena; Rike Media Sari; Dini Mita Sari
2022 Hangzhou	Thailand (THA); Primprapha Kaewkhamsai; Ratsamee Thongsod; Somruedee Pruepruk; Wiphada Chitphuan; Sirinan Khiaopak	Vietnam (VIE); Trần Thị Hồng Nhung; Trần Thị Ngọc Yến; Lê Thị Tú Trinh; Nguyễn Thị Yến; Nguyễn Thị Ngọc Huyền	India (IND); Maipak Devi Ayekpam; Leirentonbi Devi Elangbam; Chaoba Devi Oinam; Khushbu; Priya Devi Elangbam
2022 Hangzhou	Thailand (THA); Primprapha Kaewkhamsai; Ratsamee Thongsod; Somruedee Pruepruk; Wiphada Chitphuan; Sirinan Khiaopak	Vietnam (VIE); Trần Thị Hồng Nhung; Trần Thị Ngọc Yến; Lê Thị Tú Trinh; Nguyễn Thị Yến; Nguyễn Thị Ngọc Huyền	South Korea (KOR); Bae Han-oul; Park Seon-ju; Wi Ji-seon; Lee Jin-hee; Jeon Gyu-mi

=== Quadrant ===
Games	Gold	Silver	Bronze
2018 Jakarta–Palembang	Thailand (THA); Masaya Duangsri; Sasiwimol Janthasit; Fueangfa Praphatsarang; Somruedee Pruepruk; Payom Srihongsa; Wiphada Chitphuan	Vietnam (VIE); Nguyễn Thị Quyên; Giáp Thị Hiền; Dương Thị Xuyên; Hoàng Thị Hoà; Nguyễn Thị Phương Trinh; Nguyễn Thị My	Indonesia (INA); Leni; Dini Mita Sari; Florensia Cristy; Lena; Akyko Micheel Kapito; Kusnelia
2018 Jakarta–Palembang	Thailand (THA); Masaya Duangsri; Sasiwimol Janthasit; Fueangfa Praphatsarang; Somruedee Pruepruk; Payom Srihongsa; Wiphada Chitphuan	Vietnam (VIE); Nguyễn Thị Quyên; Giáp Thị Hiền; Dương Thị Xuyên; Hoàng Thị Hoà; Nguyễn Thị Phương Trinh; Nguyễn Thị My	Laos (LAO); Koy Xayavong; Norkham Vongxay; Sonsavan Keosouliya; Santisouk Chandala; Chiep Banxavang; Nouandam Volabouth
2022 Hangzhou	Vietnam (VIE); Nguyễn Thị Mỹ; Trần Thị Hồng Nhung; Trần Thị Ngọc Yến; Lê Thị Tú Trinh; Nguyễn Thị Yến; Nguyễn Thị Ngọc Huyền	Indonesia (INA); Leni; Dita Pratiwi; Fujy Lestari; Florensia Cristy; Lena; Kusnelia	China (CHN); Chen Shishi; Zhou Jiawen; Feng Jingyan; Tang Rongmei; Cui Yonghui; Chen Yan
2022 Hangzhou	Vietnam (VIE); Nguyễn Thị Mỹ; Trần Thị Hồng Nhung; Trần Thị Ngọc Yến; Lê Thị Tú Trinh; Nguyễn Thị Yến; Nguyễn Thị Ngọc Huyền	Indonesia (INA); Leni; Dita Pratiwi; Fujy Lestari; Florensia Cristy; Lena; Kusnelia	Laos (LAO); Aksonesavanh Philavong; Lae Inthavong; Koy Xayavong; Norkham Vongxay; Nouandam Volabouth; Namfonh Morladok

=== Team regu ===
Games	Gold	Silver	Bronze
1998 Bangkok	Thailand (THA); Nongluck Darachoo; Sahattiya Faksra; Puangnoi Jenkij; Pimporn Maksorn; Yupayong Namboonla; Kanjana Pantaraj; Mayuret Paobang; Chutima Rattanakratum; Charantree Samngamya; Arun Sirikhan; Wanlaya Somchue; Areerat Takan	Myanmar (MYA); Khin Cho Latt; Khin Khin Hla; Mar Mar Win; Maw Maw; Min Min Maw; Moe Moe Lwin; Nan Soe Soe; Nu Nu Yin; San San Htay; San San Htay; Thida Shwe; Tin Tin Htwe	China (CHN); Bai Jie; Chen Jinling; Sun Xiaodan; Tong Baoying; Wang Xiaohua; Wei Li; Yu Ying; Zhang Yu; Zhao Yuxiu; Zhou Ronghong
1998 Bangkok	Thailand (THA); Nongluck Darachoo; Sahattiya Faksra; Puangnoi Jenkij; Pimporn Maksorn; Yupayong Namboonla; Kanjana Pantaraj; Mayuret Paobang; Chutima Rattanakratum; Charantree Samngamya; Arun Sirikhan; Wanlaya Somchue; Areerat Takan	Myanmar (MYA); Khin Cho Latt; Khin Khin Hla; Mar Mar Win; Maw Maw; Min Min Maw; Moe Moe Lwin; Nan Soe Soe; Nu Nu Yin; San San Htay; San San Htay; Thida Shwe; Tin Tin Htwe	Vietnam (VIE); Đặng Thị Hiền; Đặng Thị Ngọc; Hoàng Thị Thái Xuân; Lê Thị Hồng Thơm; Lưu Thị Thanh; Mai Tuyết Hoa; Nguyễn Huỳnh Bích Châu; Nguyễn Thị Thúy Vinh; Nguyễn Thị Thu Ba; Trần Nguyễn Anh Phương; Trần Thị Vui; Vũ Hải Anh
2002 Busan	Thailand (THA); Tidawan Daosakul; Sahattiya Faksra; Nitinadda Kaewkamsai; Pinporn Klongbungkar; Yupayong Namboonla; Varee Nantasing; Viparat Ruangrat; Payom Srihongsa; Pudsadee Sunajarun; Anchalee Suvanmajo; Areerat Takan; Kanjana Yanyajan	Vietnam (VIE); Đậu Bảo Hiền; Hoàng Thị Thái Xuân; Lê Thị Hồng Thơm; Lương Thị Việt Anh; Lưu Thị Thanh; Mai Tuyết Hoa; Nguyễn Đức Thu Hiền; Nguyễn Hải Thảo; Nguyễn Thị Bích Thủy; Nguyễn Thịnh Thu Ba; Trần Nguyễn Anh Phương; Trần Thị Vui	China (CHN); Bai Jie; Chen Yutong; Guo Dan; Hu Zhengyi; Jin Yuzhu; Liu Lei; Sun Xiaodan; Wang Xiaohua; Yu Ying; Zhou Ronghong
2002 Busan	Thailand (THA); Tidawan Daosakul; Sahattiya Faksra; Nitinadda Kaewkamsai; Pinporn Klongbungkar; Yupayong Namboonla; Varee Nantasing; Viparat Ruangrat; Payom Srihongsa; Pudsadee Sunajarun; Anchalee Suvanmajo; Areerat Takan; Kanjana Yanyajan	Vietnam (VIE); Đậu Bảo Hiền; Hoàng Thị Thái Xuân; Lê Thị Hồng Thơm; Lương Thị Việt Anh; Lưu Thị Thanh; Mai Tuyết Hoa; Nguyễn Đức Thu Hiền; Nguyễn Hải Thảo; Nguyễn Thị Bích Thủy; Nguyễn Thịnh Thu Ba; Trần Nguyễn Anh Phương; Trần Thị Vui	South Korea (KOR); Ahn Soon-ok; Jung Ji-yung; Kim Gun-sun; Kim Mi-hyeon; Kim Mi-jin; Kim Sin-jung; Lee Myung-eun; Na Yu-mi; Park Ah-ram; Park Jeong-hyeon; Park Keum-duk; Park Mi-ri
2006 Doha	Vietnam (VIE); Nguyễn Đức Thu Hiền; Lưu Thị Thanh; Nguyễn Thị Thúy An; Nguyễn Thị Hoa; Nguyễn Thị Bích Thủy; Nguyễn Thịnh Thu Ba; Nguyễn Hải Thảo; Lê Thị Hạnh; Đỗ Thị Thu Hiền; Cao Thị Yến; Nguyễn Bạch Vân	Thailand (THA); Areerat Takan; Nitinadda Kaewkamsai; Nittaya Tukaew; Anchalee Suvanmajo; Nisa Thanaattawut; Tidawan Daosakul; Payom Srihongsa; Pinporn Klongbungkar; Phutsadi Suancharun; Sahattiya Faksra; Chotika Boonthong; Viparat Ruangrat	China (CHN); Zhou Ronghong; Sun Xiaodan; Wang Xiaohua; Wang Jianshuang; Lu Jiajia; Song Cheng; Chen Caiping; Feng Zhiying; Wang Yan; Li Yajing
2006 Doha	Vietnam (VIE); Nguyễn Đức Thu Hiền; Lưu Thị Thanh; Nguyễn Thị Thúy An; Nguyễn Thị Hoa; Nguyễn Thị Bích Thủy; Nguyễn Thịnh Thu Ba; Nguyễn Hải Thảo; Lê Thị Hạnh; Đỗ Thị Thu Hiền; Cao Thị Yến; Nguyễn Bạch Vân	Thailand (THA); Areerat Takan; Nitinadda Kaewkamsai; Nittaya Tukaew; Anchalee Suvanmajo; Nisa Thanaattawut; Tidawan Daosakul; Payom Srihongsa; Pinporn Klongbungkar; Phutsadi Suancharun; Sahattiya Faksra; Chotika Boonthong; Viparat Ruangrat	South Korea (KOR); Lee Myung-eun; Park Keum-duk; Jung Ji-yung; Ahn Soon-ok; Jeong In-seon; Yu Yeong-sim; Kim Hee-jin; Park Na-yeon; Song Jung-a; Kim Mi-jeong
2010 Guangzhou	Thailand (THA); Tidawan Daosakul; Masaya Duangsri; Wanwisa Jankaen; Nitinadda Kaewkamsai; Kaewjai Pumsawangkaew; Sunthari Rupsung; Phikun Seedam; Payom Srihongsa; Nareerat Takan; Rungtip Tanaking; Nisa Thanaattawut; Daranee Wongcharern	China (CHN); Cui Yonghui; Gu Xihui; Lao Tianxue; Liu Xiaofang; Liu Yanhong; Song Cheng; Sun Xiaodan; Wang Xiaohua; Zhang Yanan; Zhao Tengfei; Zhou Ronghong	Indonesia (INA); Aliya Prihatini; Asmira; Dini Mita Sari; Florensia Cristy; Hasmawati Umar; Jumasiah; Lena; Leni; Mega Citra Kusuma; Nur Qadriyanti; Rike Media Sari
2010 Guangzhou	Thailand (THA); Tidawan Daosakul; Masaya Duangsri; Wanwisa Jankaen; Nitinadda Kaewkamsai; Kaewjai Pumsawangkaew; Sunthari Rupsung; Phikun Seedam; Payom Srihongsa; Nareerat Takan; Rungtip Tanaking; Nisa Thanaattawut; Daranee Wongcharern	China (CHN); Cui Yonghui; Gu Xihui; Lao Tianxue; Liu Xiaofang; Liu Yanhong; Song Cheng; Sun Xiaodan; Wang Xiaohua; Zhang Yanan; Zhao Tengfei; Zhou Ronghong	Vietnam (VIE); Đinh Thị Thúy Hằng; Lại Thị Huyền Trang; Lê Thị Hạnh; Lưu Thị Thanh; Nguyễn Bạch Vân; Nguyễn Hải Thảo; Nguyễn Thị Bích Thủy; Nguyễn Thị Dung; Nguyễn Thị Hạnh Ngân; Nguyễn Thị Thuý An; Nguyễn Thịnh Thu Ba; Trương Thị Vân
2014 Incheon	Thailand (THA); Masaya Duangsri; Sunthari Rupsung; Rungtip Tanaking; Kaewjai Pumsawangkaew; Priyapat Saton; Wiphada Chitphuan; Fueangfa Praphatsarang; Sasiwimol Janthasit; Wanwisa Jankaen; Somruedee Pruepruk; Payom Srihongsa; Nattiya Chantavet	Myanmar (MYA); Ei Thin Zar; Nant Yin Yin Myint; Kyu Kyu Thin; Khin Hnin Wai; Htut Kay Zin; Phyu Phyu Than; Thin Zar Soe Nyunt; Nan Su Myat San; Nwe Nwe Htwe	Indonesia (INA); Irma Wati; Leni; Widya Andrini Modjundju; Jumasiah; Florensia Cristy; Lena; Rike Media Sari; Nur Isni Chikita Sumito; Kusnelia; Dini Mita Sari; Hasmawati Umar
2014 Incheon	Thailand (THA); Masaya Duangsri; Sunthari Rupsung; Rungtip Tanaking; Kaewjai Pumsawangkaew; Priyapat Saton; Wiphada Chitphuan; Fueangfa Praphatsarang; Sasiwimol Janthasit; Wanwisa Jankaen; Somruedee Pruepruk; Payom Srihongsa; Nattiya Chantavet	Myanmar (MYA); Ei Thin Zar; Nant Yin Yin Myint; Kyu Kyu Thin; Khin Hnin Wai; Htut Kay Zin; Phyu Phyu Than; Thin Zar Soe Nyunt; Nan Su Myat San; Nwe Nwe Htwe	Vietnam (VIE); Nguyễn Thị Quyên; Cao Thị Hải Yến; Lê Thị Tâm; Trần Thị Thùy Linh; Cao Thị Yến; Nguyễn Thị Bích Thủy; Dương Thị Xuyên; Nguyễn Thị Hòa; Bùi Thị Hải Yến; Nguyễn Bạch Vân; Trần Thị Thu Hoài
2018 Jakarta–Palembang	Thailand (THA); Masaya Duangsri; Suputtra Beartong; Thitima Mahakusol; Kaewjai Pumsawangkaew; Sasiwimol Janthasit; Thidarat Soda; Fueangfa Praphatsarang; Nisa Thanaattawut; Nipaporn Salupphon; Somruedee Pruepruk; Payom Srihongsa; Wiphada Chitphuan	South Korea (KOR); Kim Dong-hee; Kim I-seul; Bae Han-oul; Jeon Gyu-mi; Kim Ji-eun; Lee Min-ju; Choi Ji-na; Yu Seong-hee; Kim Ji-young; Kim Hee-jin; Park Seon-ju; Jung Ju-seung	Myanmar (MYA); Kyu Kyu Thin; Khin Hnin Wai; Aye Aye Than; Nant Yin Yin Myint; Phyu Phyu Than; Su Mon Kyaw; Lairo Eng; Su Mon Aung; Nan Su Myat San; Ya Mong Zin; Nyein Chan Thu; Su Yee Htet
2018 Jakarta–Palembang	Thailand (THA); Masaya Duangsri; Suputtra Beartong; Thitima Mahakusol; Kaewjai Pumsawangkaew; Sasiwimol Janthasit; Thidarat Soda; Fueangfa Praphatsarang; Nisa Thanaattawut; Nipaporn Salupphon; Somruedee Pruepruk; Payom Srihongsa; Wiphada Chitphuan	South Korea (KOR); Kim Dong-hee; Kim I-seul; Bae Han-oul; Jeon Gyu-mi; Kim Ji-eun; Lee Min-ju; Choi Ji-na; Yu Seong-hee; Kim Ji-young; Kim Hee-jin; Park Seon-ju; Jung Ju-seung	Vietnam (VIE); Nguyễn Thị Quyên; Giáp Thị Hiền; Nguyễn Thị Thu Hạnh; Dương Thị Xuyên; Đặng Thị Phương Thanh; Hoàng Thị Hoà; Bùi Thị Hải Yến; Phạm Thị Hằng; Nguyễn Thị Phương Trinh; Trần Thị Thu Hoài; Nguyễn Thị My; Đặng Thị Mỹ Linh
2022 Hangzhou	Thailand (THA); Masaya Duangsri; Primprapha Kaewkhamsai; Kaewjai Pumsawangkaew; Pruksa Maneewong; Ratsamee Thongsod; Manlika Bunthod; Somruedee Pruepruk; Wiphada Chitphuan; Sirinan Khiaopak; Usa Srikhamlue; Nipaporn Salupphon; Wassana Soiraya	South Korea (KOR); Kim Ji-eun; Kim Se-young; Bae Han-oul; Park Seon-ju; Choi Ji-na; Lee Min-ju; Wi Ji-seon; Park Sung-gyung; Han Ye-ji; Bae Chae-eun; Jo Seo-hyeon; Jeon Gyu-mi	Indonesia (INA); Asmira; Leni; Dita Pratiwi; Fujy Lestari; Florensia Cristy; Lena; Wan Annisa Rachmadi; Asmaaul Husna; Kusnelia; Dona Aulia; Fitra Siu; Frisca Kharisma Indrasari
2022 Hangzhou	Thailand (THA); Masaya Duangsri; Primprapha Kaewkhamsai; Kaewjai Pumsawangkaew; Pruksa Maneewong; Ratsamee Thongsod; Manlika Bunthod; Somruedee Pruepruk; Wiphada Chitphuan; Sirinan Khiaopak; Usa Srikhamlue; Nipaporn Salupphon; Wassana Soiraya	South Korea (KOR); Kim Ji-eun; Kim Se-young; Bae Han-oul; Park Seon-ju; Choi Ji-na; Lee Min-ju; Wi Ji-seon; Park Sung-gyung; Han Ye-ji; Bae Chae-eun; Jo Seo-hyeon; Jeon Gyu-mi	Laos (LAO); Aksonesavanh Philavong; Lae Inthavong; Koy Xayavong; Norkham Vongxay; Nouandam Volabouth; Aliya Navasit; Vansone Bouavong; Sone Amphay Soulinthone; Neechapad Mapha; Namfonh Morladok
