= Sepak takraw at the 1998 Asian Games – Men's team regu =

Men's team regu at the 1998 Asian Games
- Venue: Indoor Stadium Huamark
- Date: 7–12 December 1998
- Nations: 7

Medalists
gold medal	Thailand
silver medal	Malaysia
bronze medal	Myanmar
bronze medal	Singapore

The men's team regu sepak takraw competition at the 1998 Asian Games in Bangkok was held from 7 to 12 December at the Indoor Stadium Huamark.

== Results ==
All times are Indochina Time (UTC+07:00)

=== Preliminaries ===
==== Group A ====
Pos	Team	Pld	W	L	MF	MA	MD	Pts	Qualification
1	Thailand	3	3	0	9	0	+9	6	Semifinals
2	Singapore	3	2	1	5	4	+1	4	Semifinals
3	Brunei	3	1	2	4	5	−1	2	
4	Cambodia	3	0	3	0	9	−9	0	

Source: Results

Date		Score	
07 Dec	Brunei	3–0	Cambodia
07 Dec	Thailand	3–0	Singapore
08 Dec	Singapore	3–0	Cambodia
08 Dec	Thailand	3–0	Brunei
09 Dec	Thailand	3–0	Cambodia
09 Dec	Singapore	2–1	Brunei

==== Group B ====
Pos	Team	Pld	W	L	MF	MA	MD	Pts	Qualification
1	Malaysia	2	2	0	6	0	+6	4	Semifinals
2	Myanmar	2	1	1	3	3	0	2	Semifinals
3	Laos	2	0	2	0	6	−6	0	

Source: Results

Date		Score	
07 Dec	Malaysia	3–0	Myanmar
08 Dec	Myanmar	3–0	Laos
09 Dec	Malaysia	3–0	Laos

=== Knockout round ===
Semifinals
11 December
Thailand	3
Myanmar	0
11 December
Malaysia	3
Singapore	0

Final
12 December
Thailand	3
Malaysia	0

==== Semifinals ====
Date	Time		Score		Regu 1			Regu 2			Regu 3		
Date	Time		Score		Set 1	Set 2	Set 3	Set 1	Set 2	Set 3	Set 1	Set 2	Set 3
11 Dec	15:00	Thailand	3–0	Myanmar	2–0			2–0			2–0		
11 Dec	15:00	Thailand	3–0	Myanmar	15–2	15–1		15–1	15–1		15–5	15–3	
11 Dec	15:00	Malaysia	3–0	Singapore	2–0			2–0			2–0		
11 Dec	15:00	Malaysia	3–0	Singapore	15–8	15–6		15–14	15–13		15–8	15–1	

==== Final ====
Date	Time		Score		Regu 1			Regu 2			Regu 3		
Date	Time		Score		Set 1	Set 2	Set 3	Set 1	Set 2	Set 3	Set 1	Set 2	Set 3
12 Dec	18:00	Thailand	3–0	Malaysia	2–0			2–0			2–0		
12 Dec	18:00	Thailand	3–0	Malaysia	15–9	15–3		15–3	15–5		15–5	15–5	
