= Sepak takraw at the 1998 Asian Games – Men's regu =

Men's regu at the 1998 Asian Games
- Venue: Indoor Stadium Huamark
- Date: 13–17 December 1998
- Nations: 11

Medalists
gold medal	Thailand
silver medal	Malaysia
bronze medal	Myanmar
bronze medal	Brunei

The men's regu sepak takraw competition at the 1998 Asian Games in Bangkok was held from 13 to 17 December at the Indoor Stadium Huamark.

== Results ==
=== Preliminaries ===
==== Group A ====
Pos	Team	Pld	W	L	SF	SA	SD	Pts	Qualification
1	Thailand	3	3	0	6	0	+6	6	Round 2
2	Singapore	3	2	1	4	2	+2	4	Round 2
3	Japan	3	1	2	2	4	−2	2	
4	Cambodia	3	0	3	0	6	−6	0	

Source: Results

Date		Score		Set 1	Set 2	Set 3
13 Dec	Japan	0–2	Singapore	7–15	10–15	
13 Dec	Thailand	2–0	Cambodia	15–2	15–1	
13 Dec	Japan	0–2	Thailand	4–15	5–15	
13 Dec	Singapore	2–0	Cambodia	15–4	15–5	
14 Dec	Cambodia	0–2	Japan	10–15	7–15	
14 Dec	Thailand	2–0	Singapore	15–2	15–12	

==== Group B ====
Pos	Team	Pld	W	L	SF	SA	SD	Pts	Qualification
1	Myanmar	3	3	0	6	0	+6	6	Round 2
2	Brunei	3	2	1	4	2	+2	4	Round 2
3	Laos	3	1	2	2	5	−3	2	
4	Philippines	3	0	3	1	6	−5	0	

Source: Results

Date		Score		Set 1	Set 2	Set 3
13 Dec	Laos	2–1	Philippines	12–15	15–11	6–2
13 Dec	Brunei	0–2	Myanmar	13–15	3–15	
14 Dec	Myanmar	2–0	Philippines	15–2	15–6	
14 Dec	Laos	0–2	Brunei	14–15	12–15	
14 Dec	Brunei	2–0	Philippines	15–11	15–7	
14 Dec	Laos	0–2	Myanmar	10–15	2–15	

==== Group C ====
Pos	Team	Pld	W	L	SF	SA	SD	Pts	Qualification
1	Malaysia	2	2	0	4	0	+4	4	Round 2
2	South Korea	2	1	1	2	3	−1	2	Round 2
3	Indonesia	2	0	2	1	4	−3	0	

Source: Results

Date		Score		Set 1	Set 2	Set 3
13 Dec	Indonesia	1–2	South Korea	15–4	12–15	2–6
14 Dec	Malaysia	2–0	Indonesia	15–2	15–4	
14 Dec	Malaysia	2–0	South Korea	15–4	15–2	

=== Round 2 ===
==== Group A ====
Pos	Team	Pld	W	L	SF	SA	SD	Pts	Qualification
1	Thailand	2	2	0	4	0	+4	4	Semifinals
2	Brunei	2	1	1	2	2	0	2	Semifinals
3	South Korea	2	0	2	0	4	−4	0	

Source: Results

Date		Score		Set 1	Set 2	Set 3
15 Dec	Thailand	2–0	South Korea	15–3	15–2	
15 Dec	South Korea	0–2	Brunei	10–15	10–15	
15 Dec	Thailand	2–0	Brunei	15–1	15–1	

==== Group B ====
Pos	Team	Pld	W	L	SF	SA	SD	Pts	Qualification
1	Malaysia	2	2	0	4	0	+4	4	Semifinals
2	Myanmar	2	1	1	2	2	0	2	Semifinals
3	Singapore	2	0	2	0	4	−4	0	

Source: Results

Date		Score		Set 1	Set 2	Set 3
15 Dec	Singapore	0–2	Malaysia	10–15	13–15	
15 Dec	Malaysia	2–0	Myanmar	15–1	15–4	
15 Dec	Singapore	0–2	Myanmar	7–15	8–15	

=== Knockout round ===
Semifinals
16 December
Thailand	2
Myanmar	0
16 December
Malaysia	2
Brunei	0

Final
17 December
Thailand	2
Malaysia	0

==== Semifinals ====
Date		Score		Set 1	Set 2	Set 3
16 Dec	Thailand	2–0	Myanmar	15–4	15–2	
16 Dec	Malaysia	2–0	Brunei	15–8	15–2	

==== Final ====
Date		Score		Set 1	Set 2	Set 3
17 Dec	Thailand	2–0	Malaysia	15–3	15–8	
