= Sepak takraw at the 1998 Asian Games – Men's circle =

Men's circle at the 1998 Asian Games
- Venue: Indoor Stadium Huamark
- Date: 18–19 December 1998
- Competitors: 56 from 10 nations

Medalists
gold medal	Thailand
silver medal	Myanmar
bronze medal	Malaysia

The men's circle sepak takraw competition at the 1998 Asian Games in Bangkok was held from 18 to 19 December at the Indoor Stadium Huamark.

== Schedule ==
All times are Indochina Time (UTC+07:00)

Date	Time	Event
Friday, 18 December 1998	14:00	Preliminaries
Friday, 18 December 1998	17:00	Round 2
Saturday, 19 December 1998	14:00	Final

== Squads ==
Brunei	Cambodia	Indonesia	Japan
H. Hj Ahmad; Supardi Hj Ahmad; Ahzaman Muhammad; H. Hj Muhammad; Sabtu Omar; H. Hj Untong	Chhin Vitou; Chhuon Ponnarith; So Supheb; Troeng Lee; Ung Narith; Yin Kompheak	Bahar Baharuddin; Iwan Irwansyah; Jusri Pakke; Iwan Rasiwan; Edy Suwarno	Tomonori Arai; Kentaro Nomi; Kenji Tajiri; Susumu Teramoto; Junya Yano
Laos	Malaysia	Myanmar	Philippines
Souphoth Bouakham; Khankab Phongoudom; Ngordxhi Phongoudom; P. Phouangmala; Khamsone Vongxay	Ghazali Abdul Ghani; Burhanuddin Asiman; Noorhisham Ghani; Mustapha Kamal Hussin; Zahar Hj Ismail; Mahadi Said	Aung Myo San Myint; Aung Than; Kyaw Min Soe; Kyaw Zay Ya; Phyo Wai Lwin; Than Zaw Oo	Junmar Aleta; Harrison Castañares; Rodolfo Eco; Jaime Mora; Metodio Suico
Singapore	Thailand		
Mohd Nazri Abdullah; Ahmad Fauzi Omar Bakri; Raffi Buang; Irwan Kamis; Lee Soon Chai; Mohd Fami Mohamed	Chayan Chinnawong; Surasak Jitchuen; Yothin Jorsao; Ekachai Masuk; Thanakorn Ritsaranchai; Sawat Sangpakdee		

== Results ==
=== Preliminaries ===
Rank	Team	Score	Seed
1	Myanmar	1550	Group 1
2	Thailand	1450	Group 2
3	Malaysia	1131	Group 1
4	Indonesia	937	Group 2
5	Japan	861	Group 1
6	Laos	720	Group 2
7	Cambodia	708	Group 1
8	Singapore	562	Group 2
9	Philippines	449	Group 1
10	Brunei	367	Group 2

=== Round 2 ===
==== Group 1 ====
Rank	Team	Score
1	Myanmar	4983
2	Malaysia	3449
3	Japan	2875
4	Cambodia	2531
5	Philippines	1522

==== Group 2 ====
Rank	Team	Score
1	Thailand	5058
2	Indonesia	3404
3	Laos	2540
4	Singapore	1877
5	Brunei	1521

=== Final ===
Rank	Team	Score
1st place, gold medalist(s)	Thailand	5134
2nd place, silver medalist(s)	Myanmar	4701
3rd place, bronze medalist(s)	Malaysia	3593
4	Indonesia	3581
