= Brunei at the Asian Games =

- IOC code: BRU
- NOC: Brunei Darussalam National Olympic Council
- Website: www.bruneiolympic.org (in English)
- Medals Ranked 42nd: Gold 0 Silver 1 Bronze 6 Total 7

Summer appearances
- 1990; 1994; 1998; 2002; 2006; 2010; 2014; 2018; 2022; 2026

Brunei first competed at the Asian Games in 1990 and have not missed an edition since then but has never taken part at the Asian Winter Games.

Brunei won its first ever medal in the Asian Games at the 1994 games in Hiroshima.

== Asian Games ==
=== Medals by sport ===
Sport	Gold	Silver	Bronze	Total
Wushu	0	1	1	2
Karate	0	0	4	4
Sepak takraw	0	0	1	1
Totals (3 entries)	0	1	6	7

=== List of medalists ===
Medal	Name	Games	Sport	Event
Silver	Basma Lachkar	2022 Hangzhou	Wushu	Women's Taijiquan / Taijijian
Bronze	Marliza binti Pengiran Omar	1994 Hiroshima	Karate	Women's Kumite −60 kg
Bronze	Meghan Loo	1994 Hiroshima	Karate	Women's Kumite +60 kg
Bronze	National team	1998 Bangkok	Sepak takraw	Men's Regu
Bronze	Tong Kit Siong	2002 Busan	Karate	Men's Kumite −75 kg
Bronze	Shamrin Farhah Syahirah Mohamad; Rodhyatul Adhwanna binti Bakar; Farhana Najeeha	2022 Hangzhou	Karate	Women's team kata
Bronze	Basma Lachkar	2026 Aichi–Nagoya	Wushu	Women's Taijiquan / Taijijian

== Asian Para Games ==
=== Medals by Games ===
Games	Rank	Gold	Silver	Bronze	Total
(China) 2010 Guangzhou	25	0	2	2	4
(South Korea) 2014 Incheon	29	0	0	2	2
(Indonesia) 2018 Jakarta	0	0	0	0	0
(China) 2022 Hangzhou	0	0	0	0	0
(Japan) 2026 Aichi–Nagoya	0	0	0	0	0
Total	34	0	2	4	6

== Asian Beach Games ==
=== List of medalists ===
Medal	Name	Games	Sport	Event
Gold	Ismail Ang; Hafizuddin Jamaluddin; Nur Alimin Sungoh; Mohd Shukri Jaineh; Jamaluddin Hj Marzi	2014 Phuket	Beach sepak takraw	Men's trios
Silver	Amirul Ahat	2008 Bali	Pencak silat	Men's tanding class A 45–50 kg
Silver	Siti Zuliza Omar	2008 Bali	Pencak silat	Women's tanding class D 60–65 kg
Bronze	Norleyermah Hj Raya	2008 Bali	Pencak silat	Women's tunggal
Bronze	Ismail Ang; Mohd Basyiruddin Hj Kamis; Mohd Shukri Jaineh; Abdul Amin Mahari; Nur Alimin Sungoh; Mohd Azri Tahir	2012 Haiyang	Beach sepak takraw	Men's regu
Bronze	Abdul Hadi Ariffin Matali; Alliffuddin Jamaludin; Zatie Hidayat Saidi; Md Selamat Yakup	2016 Da Nang	Beach sepak takraw	Men's trios
