= Sepak takraw at the 1998 Asian Games – Women's circle =

Women's circle at the 1998 Asian Games
- Venue: Indoor Stadium Huamark
- Date: 18–19 December 1998
- Competitors: 47 from 8 nations

Medalists
gold medal	Thailand
silver medal	Myanmar
bronze medal	Vietnam

The women's circle sepak takraw competition at the 1998 Asian Games in Bangkok was held from 18 to 19 December at the Indoor Stadium Huamark.

== Schedule ==
All times are Indochina Time (UTC+07:00)

Date	Time	Event
Friday, 18 December 1998	09:00	Preliminaries
Friday, 18 December 1998	12:00	Round 2
Saturday, 19 December 1998	09:00	Final

== Squads ==
Cambodia	China	Indonesia	Japan
Duch Sorphorn; Em Pisey; Ouk Sok San; San Sopheap; San Sophorn; Suon Sarath	Bai Jie; Sun Xiaodan; Tong Baoying; Wang Xiaohua; Yu Ying; Zhou Ronghong	Siti Hawa Djamalu; S. Kaliey; Cici Miarsi; Ita Hatijah Rauf; Rice; Alberthina Suryani	Masumi Aikawa; Keiko Ishikawa; Chiharu Oku; Yumiko Shiba; Chihiro Toyoizumi
Laos	Myanmar	Thailand	Vietnam
Sanakhone Ekkavong; Sisakhone Luanglath; S. Phanthanivong; S. Phengvenevongsoth; Noly Samontry; Soukthavy Sirivong	Mar Mar Win; Moe Moe Lwin; Nu Nu Yin; San San Htay; San San Htay; Tin Tin Htwe	Nittiya Boonjunag; Kobkul Chinchaiyaphom; Lumpiang Pumpim; Buaphan Sawatdipon; Wanwipa Seelahoi; Warn Sochaiyan	Đặng Thị Ngọc; Lê Thị Hồng Thơm; Lưu Thị Thanh; Nguyễn Thị Thúy Vinh; Trần Nguyễn Anh Phương; Trần Thị Vui

== Results ==
=== Preliminaries ===
Rank	Team	Score	Seed
1	Thailand	1147	Group 1
2	Myanmar	900	Group 2
3	Vietnam	777	Group 1
4	Indonesia	738	Group 2
5	Japan	565	Group 1
6	China	541	Group 2
7	Cambodia	392	Group 1
8	Laos	280	Group 2

=== Round 2 ===
==== Group 1 ====
Rank	Team	Score
1	Thailand	3221
2	Vietnam	2567
3	Japan	1804
4	Cambodia	1357

==== Group 2 ====
Rank	Team	Score
1	Myanmar	3272
2	Indonesia	2291
3	China	1797
4	Laos	1150

=== Final ===
Rank	Team	Score
1st place, gold medalist(s)	Thailand	3708
2nd place, silver medalist(s)	Myanmar	3374
3rd place, bronze medalist(s)	Vietnam	2543
4	Indonesia	2494
