= Sepak takraw at the 1998 Asian Games – Women's regu =

Women's regu at the 1998 Asian Games
- Venue: Indoor Stadium Huamark
- Date: 13–17 December 1998
- Nations: 8

Medalists
gold medal	Myanmar
silver medal	Vietnam
bronze medal	Thailand
bronze medal	China

The women's regu sepak takraw competition at the 1998 Asian Games in Bangkok was held from 13 to 17 December at the Indoor Stadium Huamark.

== Results ==
=== Preliminaries ===
==== Group A ====
Pos	Team	Pld	W	L	SF	SA	SD	Pts	Qualification
1	Vietnam	3	3	0	6	1	+5	6	Semifinals
2	Myanmar	3	2	1	5	2	+3	4	Semifinals
3	Japan	3	1	2	2	4	−2	2	
4	Laos	3	0	3	0	6	−6	0	

Source: Results

Date		Score		Set 1	Set 2	Set 3
13 Dec	Japan	2–0	Laos	15–8	15–5	
13 Dec	Myanmar	1–2	Vietnam	12–15	15–13	2–6
14 Dec	Japan	0–2	Myanmar	1–15	2–15	
14 Dec	Laos	0–2	Vietnam	3–15	7–15	
15 Dec	Myanmar	2–0	Laos	15–2	15–2	
15 Dec	Vietnam	2–0	Japan	15–4	15–4	

==== Group B ====
Pos	Team	Pld	W	L	SF	SA	SD	Pts	Qualification
1	China	3	3	0	6	0	+6	6	Semifinals
2	Thailand	3	2	1	4	3	+1	4	Semifinals
3	Indonesia	3	1	2	3	4	−1	2	
4	Cambodia	3	0	3	0	6	−6	0	

Source: Results

Date		Score		Set 1	Set 2	Set 3
13 Dec	Thailand	2–0	Cambodia	15–2	15–0	
13 Dec	China	2–0	Indonesia	15–3	15–3	
14 Dec	Cambodia	0–2	China	0–15	2–15	
14 Dec	Thailand	2–1	Indonesia	13–15	15–2	6–4
15 Dec	China	2–0	Thailand	15–9	15–13	
15 Dec	Cambodia	0–2	Indonesia	1–15	2–15	

=== Knockout round ===
Semifinals
16 December
Vietnam	2
Thailand	1
16 December
China	1
Myanmar	2

Final
17 December
Vietnam	1
Myanmar	2

==== Semifinals ====
Date		Score		Set 1	Set 2	Set 3
16 Dec	Vietnam	2–1	Thailand	15–13	9–15	6–4
16 Dec	China	1–2	Myanmar	12–15	15–13	2–6

==== Final ====
Date		Score		Set 1	Set 2	Set 3
17 Dec	Vietnam	1–2	Myanmar	15–8	5–15	5–6
