= Sepak takraw at the 1998 Asian Games – Women's team regu =

Women's team regu at the 1998 Asian Games
- Venue: Indoor Stadium Huamark
- Date: 7–12 December 1998
- Nations: 6

Medalists
gold medal	Thailand
silver medal	Myanmar
bronze medal	China
bronze medal	Vietnam

The women's team regu sepak takraw competition at the 1998 Asian Games in Bangkok was held from 7 to 12 December at the Indoor Stadium Huamark.

== Results ==
All times are Indochina Time (UTC+07:00)

=== Preliminaries ===
==== Group A ====
Pos	Team	Pld	W	L	MF	MA	MD	Pts	Qualification
1	Thailand	2	2	0	6	0	+6	4	Semifinals
2	Vietnam	2	1	1	3	3	0	2	Semifinals
3	Cambodia	2	0	2	0	6	−6	0	

Source: Results

Date		Score	
07 Dec	Thailand	3–0	Cambodia
08 Dec	Vietnam	3–0	Cambodia
09 Dec	Thailand	3–0	Vietnam

==== Group B ====
Pos	Team	Pld	W	L	MF	MA	MD	Pts	Qualification
1	Myanmar	2	2	0	5	1	+4	4	Semifinals
2	China	2	1	1	4	2	+2	2	Semifinals
3	Laos	2	0	2	0	6	−6	0	

Source: Results

Date		Score	
07 Dec	Myanmar	3–0	Laos
08 Dec	Myanmar	2–1	China
09 Dec	China	3–0	Laos

=== Knockout round ===
Semifinals
10 December
Thailand	3
China	0
10 December
Myanmar	2
Vietnam	1

Final
12 December
Thailand	3
Myanmar	0

==== Semifinals ====
Date	Time		Score		Regu 1			Regu 2			Regu 3		
Date	Time		Score		Set 1	Set 2	Set 3	Set 1	Set 2	Set 3	Set 1	Set 2	Set 3
10 Dec	15:00	Thailand	3–0	China	2–1			2–0			2–0		
10 Dec	15:00	Thailand	3–0	China	15–10	6–15	6–4	15–2	15–11		15–3	15–11	
10 Dec	15:00	Myanmar	2–1	Vietnam									

==== Final ====
Date	Time		Score		Regu 1			Regu 2			Regu 3		
Date	Time		Score		Set 1	Set 2	Set 3	Set 1	Set 2	Set 3	Set 1	Set 2	Set 3
12 Dec	15:00	Thailand	3–0	Myanmar	2–0			2–0			2–0		
12 Dec	15:00	Thailand	3–0	Myanmar	15–6	15–13		15–5	15–9		15–2	15–4	
