= Sepak takraw at the 2002 Asian Games =

- Venue: Minseok Sports Center
- Dates: 30 September – 9 October 2002
- Competitors: 153 from 10 nations

Sepak takraw was contested at the 2002 Asian Games in Busan, South Korea by both men and women, with all games taking place at Dongseo University Minseok Sports Center.

== Schedule ==
P	Preliminary round	½	Semifinals	F	Final

Event↓/Date →	30th Mon		1st Tue	2nd Wed	3rd Thu	4th Fri		5th Sat	6th Sun	7th Mon	8th Tue		9th Wed	
Men's circle	P	½	F											
Men's regu										P	P		½	F
Men's team regu				P	P	P	½	½	F					
Women's circle	P	½	F											
Women's regu										P	P	½	F	
Women's team regu				P	P	P		½	F					

== Medalists ==
=== Men ===
Event	Gold	Silver	Bronze
Circle	South Korea; Lee Jun-pyo; Yoo Dong-young; Kim Jong-hun; Lee Myung-chul; Gwak Young-duk; Yoon Ju-hyung	Thailand; Yothin Jorsao; Sawat Sangpakdee; Ekachai Masuk; Saharat Uonumpai; Surasak Jitchuen; Thanakorn Ritsaranchai	Myanmar; Thein Zaw Min; Than Zaw Oo; Kyaw Zay Ya; Kyaw Min Soe; Aung Myo San Myint; Myint Swe
Circle	South Korea; Lee Jun-pyo; Yoo Dong-young; Kim Jong-hun; Lee Myung-chul; Gwak Young-duk; Yoon Ju-hyung	Thailand; Yothin Jorsao; Sawat Sangpakdee; Ekachai Masuk; Saharat Uonumpai; Surasak Jitchuen; Thanakorn Ritsaranchai	Japan; Yoshitaka Iida; Kenji Tajiri; Susumu Teramoto; Fumio Arashi; Junya Yano
Regu	Thailand; Suebsak Phunsueb; Sarawut Inlek; Pornchai Kaokaew; Worapot Thongsai; Poonsak Permsap	Myanmar; Kyaw Min Soe; Than Zaw Oo; Aung Myo San Myint; Aung Hein; Maung Maung	Singapore; Nur Hisham Adam; Shamsaimon Sabtu; Sharil Abdul Shukor; Eddie Abdul Kadir; Mohd Fami Mohamed
Regu	Thailand; Suebsak Phunsueb; Sarawut Inlek; Pornchai Kaokaew; Worapot Thongsai; Poonsak Permsap	Myanmar; Kyaw Min Soe; Than Zaw Oo; Aung Myo San Myint; Aung Hein; Maung Maung	Malaysia; Fauzi Ghadzali; Suhaimi Mat Salim; Noor Ariffin Pawanteh; Azman Nasruddin; Zulkarnain Arif
Team regu	Thailand; Sarawut Inlek; Pornchai Kaokaew; Nattawut Panomai; Rawat Parbchompoo; Suriyan Peachan; Poonsak Permsap; Suebsak Phunsueb; Prasert Pongpung; Prawet Saejung; Chart Singrang; Kamphol Thassit; Worapot Thongsai	Malaysia; Fauzi Ghadzali; Suhaimi Mat Salim; Ahmad Ezzat Zaki; Zulkarnain Arif; Rukman Mustapha; Azman Nasruddin; Noor Ariffin Pawanteh; Zabidi Shariff; Suhaimi Yusof	South Korea; Gwak Young-duk; Jeong Sung-hwa; Jung Yeon-hong; Kim Dae-hee; Kim Hyung-il; Kim Jae-min; Kim Jong-hun; Kim Mu-jin; Lee Jun-pyo; Lee Myung-chul; Yoo Dong-young; Yoon Ju-hyung
Team regu	Thailand; Sarawut Inlek; Pornchai Kaokaew; Nattawut Panomai; Rawat Parbchompoo; Suriyan Peachan; Poonsak Permsap; Suebsak Phunsueb; Prasert Pongpung; Prawet Saejung; Chart Singrang; Kamphol Thassit; Worapot Thongsai	Malaysia; Fauzi Ghadzali; Suhaimi Mat Salim; Ahmad Ezzat Zaki; Zulkarnain Arif; Rukman Mustapha; Azman Nasruddin; Noor Ariffin Pawanteh; Zabidi Shariff; Suhaimi Yusof	Myanmar; Aung Hein; Aung Myo San Myint; Kyaw Min Soe; Kyaw Zay Ya; Maung Maung; Myint Swe; Than Zaw Oo; Thaung Nyunt; Thein Zaw Min

=== Women ===
Event	Gold	Silver	Bronze
Circle	Thailand; Lampieng Poompin; Buaphan Sawatdipon; Wanwipa Seelahoi; Kobkul Chinchaiyaphum; Buarian Faisong; Warn Sochaiyan	Myanmar; Naing Naing Win; San San Htay; Mar Mar Win; San San Htay; Nu Nu Yin; Moe Moe Lwin	South Korea; Lee Myung-eun; Kim Mi-hyeon; Kim Mi-jin; Na Yu-mi; Kim Sin-jung; Park Jeong-hyeon
Circle	Thailand; Lampieng Poompin; Buaphan Sawatdipon; Wanwipa Seelahoi; Kobkul Chinchaiyaphum; Buarian Faisong; Warn Sochaiyan	Myanmar; Naing Naing Win; San San Htay; Mar Mar Win; San San Htay; Nu Nu Yin; Moe Moe Lwin	Vietnam; Nguyễn Đức Thu Hiền; Lưu Thị Thanh; Vũ Hải Anh; Trần Nguyễn Anh Phương; Lê Thị Hồng Thơm; Mai Tuyết Hoa
Regu	Thailand; Nitinadda Kaewkamsai; Kanjana Yanyajan; Tidawan Daosakul; Pinporn Klongbungkar; Sahattiya Faksra	China; Zhou Ronghong; Sun Xiaodan; Bai Jie; Wang Xiaohua; Hu Zhengyi	Japan; Keiko Ishikawa; Sawa Aoki; Chiharu Oku; Masumi Aikawa; Mari Nakagawa
Regu	Thailand; Nitinadda Kaewkamsai; Kanjana Yanyajan; Tidawan Daosakul; Pinporn Klongbungkar; Sahattiya Faksra	China; Zhou Ronghong; Sun Xiaodan; Bai Jie; Wang Xiaohua; Hu Zhengyi	Vietnam; Lưu Thị Thanh; Hoàng Thị Thái Xuân; Trần Thị Vui; Lê Thị Hồng Thơm; Lương Thị Việt Anh
Team regu	Thailand; Tidawan Daosakul; Sahattiya Faksra; Nitinadda Kaewkamsai; Pinporn Klongbungkar; Yupayong Namboonla; Varee Nantasing; Viparat Ruangrat; Payom Srihongsa; Pudsadee Sunajarun; Anchalee Suvanmajo; Areerat Takan; Kanjana Yanyajan	Vietnam; Đậu Bảo Hiền; Hoàng Thị Thái Xuân; Lê Thị Hồng Thơm; Lương Thị Việt Anh; Lưu Thị Thanh; Mai Tuyết Hoa; Nguyễn Đức Thu Hiền; Nguyễn Hải Thảo; Nguyễn Thị Bích Thủy; Nguyễn Thịnh Thu Ba; Trần Nguyễn Anh Phương; Trần Thị Vui	China; Bai Jie; Chen Yutong; Guo Dan; Hu Zhengyi; Jin Yuzhu; Liu Lei; Sun Xiaodan; Wang Xiaohua; Yu Ying; Zhou Ronghong
Team regu	Thailand; Tidawan Daosakul; Sahattiya Faksra; Nitinadda Kaewkamsai; Pinporn Klongbungkar; Yupayong Namboonla; Varee Nantasing; Viparat Ruangrat; Payom Srihongsa; Pudsadee Sunajarun; Anchalee Suvanmajo; Areerat Takan; Kanjana Yanyajan	Vietnam; Đậu Bảo Hiền; Hoàng Thị Thái Xuân; Lê Thị Hồng Thơm; Lương Thị Việt Anh; Lưu Thị Thanh; Mai Tuyết Hoa; Nguyễn Đức Thu Hiền; Nguyễn Hải Thảo; Nguyễn Thị Bích Thủy; Nguyễn Thịnh Thu Ba; Trần Nguyễn Anh Phương; Trần Thị Vui	South Korea; Ahn Soon-ok; Jung Ji-yung; Kim Gun-sun; Kim Mi-hyeon; Kim Mi-jin; Kim Sin-jung; Lee Myung-eun; Na Yu-mi; Park Ah-ram; Park Jeong-hyeon; Park Keum-duk; Park Mi-ri

== Medal table ==
Rank	Nation	Gold	Silver	Bronze	Total
1	Thailand (THA)	5	1	0	6
2	South Korea (KOR)	1	0	3	4
3	Myanmar (MYA)	0	2	2	4
4	Vietnam (VIE)	0	1	2	3
5	China (CHN)	0	1	1	2
5	Malaysia (MAS)	0	1	1	2
7	Japan (JPN)	0	0	2	2
8	Singapore (SIN)	0	0	1	1
Totals (8 entries)		6	6	12	24

== Participating nations ==
A total of 153 athletes from 10 nations competed in sepak takraw at the 2002 Asian Games:

- Brunei (12)
- China (10)
- Japan (11)
- Malaysia (11)
- Myanmar (18)
- Philippines (6)
- Singapore (12)
- South Korea (24)
- Thailand (36)
- Vietnam (13)
