= Sepak takraw at the 1998 Asian Games =

- Venue: Indoor Stadium Huamark
- Dates: 7–19 December 1998
- Nations: 13

Sepak takraw was contested at the 1998 Asian Games in Bangkok, Thailand from 9 to 19 December by both men and women, with all games taking place at Indoor Stadium Huamark.

== Medalists ==
=== Men ===
Event	Gold	Silver	Bronze
Circle	Thailand; Chayan Chinnawong; Surasak Jitchuen; Yothin Jorsao; Ekachai Masuk; Thanakorn Ritsaranchai; Sawat Sangpakdee	Myanmar; Aung Myo San Myint; Aung Than; Kyaw Min Soe; Kyaw Zay Ya; Phyo Wai Lwin; Than Zaw Oo	Malaysia; Ghazali Abdul Ghani; Burhanuddin Asiman; Noorhisham Ghani; Mustapha Kamal Hussin; Zahar Hj Ismail; Mahadi Said
Regu	Thailand; Kittipoom Namsook; Suriyan Peachan; Poonsak Permsap; Suebsak Phunsueb	Malaysia; Rommi Suhendra Norsal; Kaharuddin Shamsuddin; Zabidi Shariff; Suhaimi Yusof	Myanmar
Regu	Thailand; Kittipoom Namsook; Suriyan Peachan; Poonsak Permsap; Suebsak Phunsueb	Malaysia; Rommi Suhendra Norsal; Kaharuddin Shamsuddin; Zabidi Shariff; Suhaimi Yusof	Brunei
Team regu	Thailand; Worapong Jodpimay; Panuchit Kaewnoi; Paisal Maihunla; Kriengkrai Mutalai; Kittipoom Namsook; Suriyan Peachan; Poonsak Permsap; Dumrong Phakaedum; Suebsak Phunsueb; Supap Rakwongrit; Kampol Tassit; Worapot Thongsai	Malaysia; Awaluddin Abdul Hamid; Suhaimi Abdul Rahman; Iskandar Arshad; Jamry Ederis; Nasir Ismail; Khairulnizam Jidin; Ahmad Rafi Noh; Rommi Suhendra Norsal; Kaharuddin Shamsuddin; Zabidi Shariff; Suhaimi Yusof; Ahmad Ezzat Zaki	Myanmar; Aung Hein; Aung Myo San Myint; Aung Than; Kyaw Min Soe; Kyaw Zay Ya; Maung Maung; Min Min Naing; Phyo Wai Lwin; San Tun Oo; Saw Tin Moe; Than Zaw Oo; Zin Tun Win
Team regu	Thailand; Worapong Jodpimay; Panuchit Kaewnoi; Paisal Maihunla; Kriengkrai Mutalai; Kittipoom Namsook; Suriyan Peachan; Poonsak Permsap; Dumrong Phakaedum; Suebsak Phunsueb; Supap Rakwongrit; Kampol Tassit; Worapot Thongsai	Malaysia; Awaluddin Abdul Hamid; Suhaimi Abdul Rahman; Iskandar Arshad; Jamry Ederis; Nasir Ismail; Khairulnizam Jidin; Ahmad Rafi Noh; Rommi Suhendra Norsal; Kaharuddin Shamsuddin; Zabidi Shariff; Suhaimi Yusof; Ahmad Ezzat Zaki	Singapore; Eddie Abdul Kadir; Herwan Abdul Wahid; Mohd Nazri Abdullah; Nur Hisham Adam; Raffi Buang; Raimon Budin; Irwan Kamis; Mohd Fami Mohamed; Mislan Munjari; Shamon Sabtu; Shamsaimon Sabtu; Ahmad Yasin

=== Women ===
Event	Gold	Silver	Bronze
Circle	Thailand; Nittiya Boonjunag; Kobkul Chinchaiyaphom; Lumpiang Pumpim; Buaphan Sawatdipon; Wanwipa Seelahoi; Warn Sochaiyan	Myanmar; Mar Mar Win; Moe Moe Lwin; Nu Nu Yin; San San Htay; San San Htay; Tin Tin Htwe	Vietnam; Đặng Thị Ngọc; Lê Thị Hồng Thơm; Lưu Thị Thanh; Nguyễn Thị Thúy Vinh; Trần Nguyễn Anh Phương; Trần Thị Vui
Regu	Myanmar; Khin Cho Latt; Mar Mar Win; San San Htay; San San Htay	Vietnam; Hoàng Thị Thái Xuân; Lưu Thị Thanh; Nguyễn Thị Thúy Vinh; Trần Thị Vui	Thailand; Nongluck Darachoo; Puangnoi Jenkij; Yupayong Namboonla; Arun Sirikhan
Regu	Myanmar; Khin Cho Latt; Mar Mar Win; San San Htay; San San Htay	Vietnam; Hoàng Thị Thái Xuân; Lưu Thị Thanh; Nguyễn Thị Thúy Vinh; Trần Thị Vui	China; Sun Xiaodan; Wang Xiaohua; Yu Ying; Zhou Ronghong
Team regu	Thailand; Nongluck Darachoo; Sahattiya Faksra; Puangnoi Jenkij; Pimporn Maksorn; Yupayong Namboonla; Kanjana Pantaraj; Mayuret Paobang; Chutima Rattanakratum; Charantree Samngamya; Arun Sirikhan; Wanlaya Somchue; Areerat Takan	Myanmar; Khin Cho Latt; Khin Khin Hla; Mar Mar Win; Maw Maw; Min Min Maw; Moe Moe Lwin; Nan Soe Soe; Nu Nu Yin; San San Htay; San San Htay; Thida Shwe; Tin Tin Htwe	China; Bai Jie; Chen Jinling; Sun Xiaodan; Tong Baoying; Wang Xiaohua; Wei Li; Yu Ying; Zhang Yu; Zhao Yuxiu; Zhou Ronghong
Team regu	Thailand; Nongluck Darachoo; Sahattiya Faksra; Puangnoi Jenkij; Pimporn Maksorn; Yupayong Namboonla; Kanjana Pantaraj; Mayuret Paobang; Chutima Rattanakratum; Charantree Samngamya; Arun Sirikhan; Wanlaya Somchue; Areerat Takan	Myanmar; Khin Cho Latt; Khin Khin Hla; Mar Mar Win; Maw Maw; Min Min Maw; Moe Moe Lwin; Nan Soe Soe; Nu Nu Yin; San San Htay; San San Htay; Thida Shwe; Tin Tin Htwe	Vietnam; Đặng Thị Hiền; Đặng Thị Ngọc; Hoàng Thị Thái Xuân; Lê Thị Hồng Thơm; Lưu Thị Thanh; Mai Tuyết Hoa; Nguyễn Huỳnh Bích Châu; Nguyễn Thị Thúy Vinh; Nguyễn Thị Thu Ba; Trần Nguyễn Anh Phương; Trần Thị Vui; Vũ Hải Anh

== Medal table ==
Rank	Nation	Gold	Silver	Bronze	Total
1	Thailand (THA)	5	0	1	6
2	Myanmar (MYA)	1	3	2	6
3	Malaysia (MAS)	0	2	1	3
4	Vietnam (VIE)	0	1	2	3
5	China (CHN)	0	0	2	2
6	Brunei (BRU)	0	0	1	1
6	Singapore (SIN)	0	0	1	1
Totals (7 entries)		6	6	10	22

== Participating nations ==
- Brunei (14)
- Cambodia
- China (10)
- Indonesia (11)
- Japan (10)
- Laos
- Malaysia (18)
- Myanmar (24)
- Philippines (5)
- Singapore (14)
- South Korea (4)
- Thailand (36)
- Vietnam (12)
