= Beach sepak takraw at the 2016 Asian Beach Games =

- Venue: Mỹ Khê Beach
- Dates: 25 September – 2 October 2016

Beach sepak takraw competition at the 2016 Asian Beach Games was held in Danang, Vietnam from 25 September to 2 October 2016 at My Khe Beach, Danang, Vietnam.

== Medalists ==
Event	Gold	Silver	Bronze
Men's trios	Myanmar; Aung Myo Swe; Thant Zin Oo; Wai Lin Aung; Myo Myint Zaw; Aung Myo Naing	Laos; Alounsack Khounmeuangsene; Daovy Sanavongxay; Noum Souvannalith; Phitthasanh Bounpaseuth; Vanhkham Sonmani	Indonesia; Wisnu Dwi Suhantoro; Yudi Purnomo; Andi Paturay; Syaifudin; Arfin
Men's trios	Myanmar; Aung Myo Swe; Thant Zin Oo; Wai Lin Aung; Myo Myint Zaw; Aung Myo Naing	Laos; Alounsack Khounmeuangsene; Daovy Sanavongxay; Noum Souvannalith; Phitthasanh Bounpaseuth; Vanhkham Sonmani	Brunei; Abdul Hadi Ariffin Matali; Alliffuddin Jamaludin; Zatie Hidayat Saidi; Md Selamat Yakup
Men's regu	Thailand; Komkid Suapimpa; Uthen Kukheaw; Phakpong Dejaroen; Yotsawat Uthaijaronsri; Seksan Tubtong; Jackrit Wijara	Myanmar; Aung Myo Swe; Thant Zin Oo; Wai Lin Aung; Myo Myint Zaw; Aung Myo Naing; Aung Naing Oo	Indonesia; Wisnu Dwi Suhantoro; Yudi Purnomo; Andi Paturay; Syaifudin; Arfin
Men's regu	Thailand; Komkid Suapimpa; Uthen Kukheaw; Phakpong Dejaroen; Yotsawat Uthaijaronsri; Seksan Tubtong; Jackrit Wijara	Myanmar; Aung Myo Swe; Thant Zin Oo; Wai Lin Aung; Myo Myint Zaw; Aung Myo Naing; Aung Naing Oo	Laos; Alounsack Khounmeuangsene; Daovy Sanavongxay; Noum Souvannalith; Phitthasanh Bounpaseuth; Anousone Vilavongsa; Vanhkham Sonmani
Men's team regu	Thailand; Komkid Suapimpa; Uthen Kukheaw; Aphisak Sarachon; Phakpong Dejaroen; Thinnagon Phanted; Alongkon Raoklang; Yotsawat Uthaijaronsri; Sornpithak Sriring; Wannimit Promdee; Seksan Tubtong; Jackrit Wijara; Tanusard Ravirod	Vietnam; Bùi Trung Mạnh; Lê Phúc Phương; Huỳnh Đức Quý; Phạm Văn Cường; Lê Anh Tuấn; Bùi Thanh Sang; Liêu Ngọc; Châu Hận; Nguyễn Trường Quyết; Lê Văn Nghĩa; Nguyễn Quốc Bằng; Trần Ngọc Vũ	Malaysia; Shahrul Ahmad Kamal; Anwar Saadon; Noraizat Mohd Nordin; Nur Akram Mustalib; Lutfil Hadi Azmi; Afiq Aiman Zairi; Hafizzudin Zulkifle; Mustaqim Zainordin; Wan Mohd Syazwan Asri; Ahmad Badrie Amin Azmi
Men's team regu	Thailand; Komkid Suapimpa; Uthen Kukheaw; Aphisak Sarachon; Phakpong Dejaroen; Thinnagon Phanted; Alongkon Raoklang; Yotsawat Uthaijaronsri; Sornpithak Sriring; Wannimit Promdee; Seksan Tubtong; Jackrit Wijara; Tanusard Ravirod	Vietnam; Bùi Trung Mạnh; Lê Phúc Phương; Huỳnh Đức Quý; Phạm Văn Cường; Lê Anh Tuấn; Bùi Thanh Sang; Liêu Ngọc; Châu Hận; Nguyễn Trường Quyết; Lê Văn Nghĩa; Nguyễn Quốc Bằng; Trần Ngọc Vũ	South Korea; Choi Yong-rim; Lee Min-soo; Nam Sang-hun; Choi Mun-jung; Wi Seong-uk; Yoon In-chul; Cho Jin-hyeok; Nam Gyu-ho; Kim Min-hyeok
Women's trios	Vietnam; Nguyễn Thái Linh; Trần Hồng Nhung; Đỗ Thị Nguyên; Trần Thị Việt Mỹ; Nguyễn Thị Mỹ	Myanmar; Nant Yin Yin Myint; Su Tin Zar Naing; Khin Hnin Wai; Thin Zar Soe Nyunt; Phyu Phyu Than	Laos; Nouandam Volabouth; Koy Xayavong; Norkham Vongxay; Chiep Banxavang; Damdouane Lattanavongsa
Women's trios	Vietnam; Nguyễn Thái Linh; Trần Hồng Nhung; Đỗ Thị Nguyên; Trần Thị Việt Mỹ; Nguyễn Thị Mỹ	Myanmar; Nant Yin Yin Myint; Su Tin Zar Naing; Khin Hnin Wai; Thin Zar Soe Nyunt; Phyu Phyu Than	Philippines; Gelyn Evora; Josefina Maat; Deseree Autor
Women's regu	Thailand; Thiwaphon Nueangchamnong; Nisa Thanaattawut; Somruedee Pruepruk; Thidarat Soda; Orathai Buasri; Jariya Seesawad	Vietnam; Nguyễn Thái Linh; Trần Hồng Nhung; Phạm Thị Nguyệt; Đỗ Thị Nguyên; Nguyễn Thị Mỹ; Thạch Thị Mỹ Linh	Myanmar; Nant Yin Yin Myint; Su Tin Zar Naing; Khin Hnin Wai; Su Mon Aung; Thin Zar Soe Nyunt; Phyu Phyu Than
Women's regu	Thailand; Thiwaphon Nueangchamnong; Nisa Thanaattawut; Somruedee Pruepruk; Thidarat Soda; Orathai Buasri; Jariya Seesawad	Vietnam; Nguyễn Thái Linh; Trần Hồng Nhung; Phạm Thị Nguyệt; Đỗ Thị Nguyên; Nguyễn Thị Mỹ; Thạch Thị Mỹ Linh	China; Zhang Yanan; Wang Qiyue; Qin Tong; Zhai Heyang
Women's team regu	Thailand; Apinya Thongpoo; Thiwaphon Nueangchamnong; Natkidta Inbua; Nisa Thanaattawut; Nongnuch Inruengsorn; Somruedee Pruepruk; Jiranan Bunvisas; Thidarat Soda; Siriphol Chaiyasit; Orathai Buasri; Jariya Seesawad; Priyapat Saton	Vietnam; Nguyễn Thái Linh; Trần Hồng Nhung; Nguyễn Thị Hiến; Phạm Thị Nguyệt; Nguyễn Thị Mơ; Đỗ Thị Nguyên; Trần Thị Việt Mỹ; Trần Thị Kiều Anh; Nguyễn Thị Yến; Nguyễn Thị Mỹ; Thạch Thị Mỹ Linh; Nguyễn Thị Kiều Oanh	Laos; Ladsamee Vilaysouk; Nouandam Volabouth; Koy Xayavong; Norkham Vongxay; Chiep Banxavang; Santisouk Chandala; Damdouane Lattanavongsa; Falida Duangmala
Women's team regu	Thailand; Apinya Thongpoo; Thiwaphon Nueangchamnong; Natkidta Inbua; Nisa Thanaattawut; Nongnuch Inruengsorn; Somruedee Pruepruk; Jiranan Bunvisas; Thidarat Soda; Siriphol Chaiyasit; Orathai Buasri; Jariya Seesawad; Priyapat Saton	Vietnam; Nguyễn Thái Linh; Trần Hồng Nhung; Nguyễn Thị Hiến; Phạm Thị Nguyệt; Nguyễn Thị Mơ; Đỗ Thị Nguyên; Trần Thị Việt Mỹ; Trần Thị Kiều Anh; Nguyễn Thị Yến; Nguyễn Thị Mỹ; Thạch Thị Mỹ Linh; Nguyễn Thị Kiều Oanh	India; Annam Tharangini; Valarmathi Raja; Nachammai Kannappan; Namita Sinha; Mamuni Mahata; Indhu Krishna Arumugam; Thamarai Selvi; Thirumalai Rajan

== Medal table ==
Rank	Nation	Gold	Silver	Bronze	Total
1	Thailand (THA)	4	0	0	4
2	Vietnam (VIE)	1	3	0	4
3	Myanmar (MYA)	1	2	1	4
4	Laos (LAO)	0	1	3	4
5	Indonesia (INA)	0	0	2	2
6	Brunei (BRU)	0	0	1	1
6	China (CHN)	0	0	1	1
6	India (IND)	0	0	1	1
6	Malaysia (MAS)	0	0	1	1
6	Philippines (PHI)	0	0	1	1
6	South Korea (KOR)	0	0	1	1
Totals (11 entries)		6	6	12	24

== Results ==
=== Men's trios ===
==== Preliminary ====
===== Group A =====
Pos	Team	Pld	W	L	SF	SA	SD	Pts
1	Indonesia	3	3	0	6	1	+5	6
2	Brunei	3	2	1	5	2	+3	4
3	India	3	1	2	2	4	−2	2
4	Nepal	3	0	3	0	6	−6	0

Source: OCA

Date		Score		Set 1	Set 2	Set 3
25 Sep	Brunei	1–2	Indonesia	12–21	21–15	13–21
25 Sep	India	0–2	Indonesia	23–25	12–21	
25 Sep	Brunei	2–0	India	21–8	21–12	
25 Sep	India	2–0	Nepal	21–11	21–13	
26 Sep	Brunei	2–0	Nepal	21–4	21–6	
26 Sep	Nepal	0–2	Indonesia	14–21	13–21	

===== Group B =====
Pos	Team	Pld	W	L	SF	SA	SD	Pts
1	Myanmar	3	3	0	6	0	+6	6
2	Laos	3	2	1	4	2	+2	4
3	Vietnam	3	1	2	2	4	−2	2
4	South Korea	3	0	3	0	6	−6	0

Source: OCA

Date		Score		Set 1	Set 2	Set 3
25 Sep	South Korea	0–2	Vietnam	6–21	11–21	
25 Sep	Laos	0–2	Myanmar	13–21	12–21	
25 Sep	South Korea	0–2	Laos	6–21	13–21	
25 Sep	Vietnam	0–2	Myanmar	16–21	14–21	
26 Sep	South Korea	0–2	Myanmar	10–21	4–21	
26 Sep	Vietnam	0–2	Laos	15–21	16–21	

==== Knockout round ====
Semifinals; 26 September				Gold medal match 27 September
Indonesia	15	4
Laos	21	21		Laos	23	18
Myanmar	19	21	21	Myanmar	25	21
Brunei	21	5	14

=== Men's regu ===
==== Preliminary ====
===== Group A =====
Pos	Team	Pld	W	L	SF	SA	SD	Pts
1	Thailand	3	3	0	6	0	+6	6
2	Laos	3	2	1	4	2	+2	4
3	Vietnam	3	1	2	2	5	−3	2
4	Malaysia	3	0	3	1	6	−5	0

Source: OCA

Date		Score		Set 1	Set 2	Set 3
27 Sep	Thailand	2–0	Vietnam	21–7	21–12	
27 Sep	Laos	2–0	Malaysia	21–17	21–15	
28 Sep	Thailand	2–0	Laos	21–12	21–14	
28 Sep	Vietnam	2–1	Malaysia	21–12	17–21	21–18
28 Sep	Thailand	2–0	Malaysia	21–12	21–12	
28 Sep	Vietnam	0–2	Laos	16–21	20–22	

===== Group B =====
Pos	Team	Pld	W	L	SF	SA	SD	Pts
1	Myanmar	3	3	0	6	0	+6	6
2	Indonesia	3	2	1	4	3	+1	4
3	Brunei	3	1	2	3	4	−1	2
4	Nepal	3	0	3	0	6	−6	0

Source: OCA

Date		Score		Set 1	Set 2	Set 3
27 Sep	Indonesia	2–0	Nepal	21–17	24–22	
27 Sep	Myanmar	2–0	Brunei	21–13	21–12	
28 Sep	Indonesia	0–2	Myanmar	11–21	19–21	
28 Sep	Nepal	0–2	Brunei	14–21	8–21	
28 Sep	Indonesia	2–1	Brunei	13–21	21–18	21–15
28 Sep	Nepal	0–2	Myanmar	12–21	11–21	

==== Knockout round ====
29 September

Semifinals				Gold medal match
Thailand	21	21
Indonesia	18	7		Thailand	21	21
Laos	8	21	19	Myanmar	8	9
Myanmar	21	15	21

=== Men's team regu ===
Pos	Team	Pld	W	L	MF	MA	MD	Pts
1	Thailand	4	4	0	12	0	+12	8
2	Vietnam	4	3	1	9	3	+6	6
3	Malaysia	4	2	2	5	7	−2	4
4	South Korea	4	1	3	2	10	−8	2
5	India	4	0	4	2	10	−8	0

Source: OCA

Date		Score		Regu 1	Regu 2	Regu 3
30 Sep	Thailand	3–0	South Korea	2–0	2–0	2–0
30 Sep	Malaysia	0–3	Vietnam	0–2	0–2	0–2
30 Sep	Vietnam	3–0	India	2–0	2–0	2–0
30 Sep	Thailand	3–0	Malaysia	2–0	2–0	2–0
01 Oct	Malaysia	3–0	South Korea	2–0	2–0	2–1
01 Oct	Thailand	3–0	India	2–0	2–0	2–0
01 Oct	Thailand	3–0	Vietnam	2–0	2–0	2–0
01 Oct	South Korea	2–1	India	0–2	2–0	2–1
02 Oct	Malaysia	2–1	India	2–0	0–2	2–0
02 Oct	Vietnam	3–0	South Korea	2–0	2–0	2–0

=== Women's trios ===
==== Preliminary ====
===== Group A =====
Pos	Team	Pld	W	L	SF	SA	SD	Pts
1	Laos	2	2	0	4	0	+4	4
2	Philippines	2	1	1	2	2	0	2
3	India	2	0	2	0	4	−4	0

Source: OCA

Date		Score		Set 1	Set 2	Set 3
25 Sep	Laos	2–0	India	21–8	21–8	
25 Sep	Laos	2–0	Philippines	21–13	22–20	
26 Sep	India	0–2	Philippines	8–21	2–21	

===== Group B =====
Pos	Team	Pld	W	L	SF	SA	SD	Pts
1	Vietnam	2	2	0	4	0	+4	4
2	Myanmar	2	1	1	2	2	0	2
3	China	2	0	2	0	4	−4	0

Source: OCA

Date		Score		Set 1	Set 2	Set 3
25 Sep	Myanmar	2–0	China	21–19	21–9	
25 Sep	Myanmar	0–2	Vietnam	17–21	15–21	
26 Sep	China	0–2	Vietnam	17–21	15–21	

==== Knockout round ====
Semifinals; 26 September			Gold medal match 27 September
Laos	10	17
Myanmar	21	21	Myanmar	9	15
Vietnam	21	21	Vietnam	21	21
Philippines	11	11

=== Women's regu ===
Pos	Team	Pld	W	L	SF	SA	SD	Pts
1	Thailand	3	3	0	6	0	+6	6
2	Vietnam	3	2	1	4	2	+2	4
3	Myanmar	3	1	2	2	4	−2	2
4	China	3	0	3	0	6	−6	0

Source: OCA

Date		Score		Set 1	Set 2	Set 3
27 Sep	Thailand	2–0	Vietnam	21–12	21–10	
27 Sep	Myanmar	2–0	China	21–15	21–17	
28 Sep	Thailand	2–0	China	21–10	21–14	
28 Sep	Myanmar	0–2	Vietnam	12–21	18–21	
28 Sep	Thailand	2–0	Myanmar	21–8	21–16	
28 Sep	Vietnam	2–0	China	21–19	21–13	

=== Women's team regu ===
Pos	Team	Pld	W	L	MF	MA	MD	Pts
1	Thailand	3	3	0	9	0	+9	6
2	Vietnam	3	2	1	5	4	+1	4
3	Laos	3	1	2	4	5	−1	2
4	India	3	0	3	0	9	−9	0

Source: OCA

Date		Score		Regu 1	Regu 2	Regu 3
29 Sep	Laos	1–2	Vietnam	0–2	0–2	2–1
29 Sep	India	0–3	Thailand	0–2	0–2	0–2
30 Sep	Laos	3–0	India	2–0	2–0	2–0
30 Sep	Vietnam	0–3	Thailand	0–2	0–2	0–2
01 Oct	Laos	0–3	Thailand	0–2	0–2	0–2
01 Oct	Vietnam	3–0	India	2–0	2–0	2–0
