= Sepak takraw at the 2002 Asian Games – Women's regu =

Women's regu at the 2002 Asian Games
- Venue: Minseok Sports Center
- Date: 7–9 October 2002
- Competitors: 30 from 6 nations

Medalists
gold medal	Thailand
silver medal	China
bronze medal	Japan
bronze medal	Vietnam

The women's regu sepak takraw competition at the 2002 Asian Games in Busan was held from 7 October to 9 October at the Minseok Sports Center in Dongseo University.

== Squads ==
China	Japan	Myanmar	South Korea
Zhou Ronghong; Sun Xiaodan; Bai Jie; Wang Xiaohua; Hu Zhengyi	Keiko Ishikawa; Sawa Aoki; Chiharu Oku; Masumi Aikawa; Mari Nakagawa	San San Htay; Mar Mar Win; San San Htay; Khin Cho Latt; May Zin Phyoe	Lee Myung-eun; Kim Mi-hyeon; Kim Mi-jin; Park Ah-ram; Jung Ji-yung
Thailand	Vietnam		
Nitinadda Kaewkamsai; Kanjana Yanyajan; Tidawan Daosakul; Pinporn Klongbungkar; Sahattiya Faksra	Lưu Thị Thanh; Hoàng Thị Thái Xuân; Trần Thị Vui; Lê Thị Hồng Thơm; Lương Thị Việt Anh		

== Results ==
All times are Korea Standard Time (UTC+09:00)

=== Preliminary round ===
==== Group A ====
Pos	Team	Pld	W	L	SF	SA	SD	Pts	Qualification
1	Thailand	2	2	0	4	0	+4	4	Semifinals
2	China	2	1	1	2	2	0	2	Semifinals
3	Myanmar	2	0	2	0	4	−4	0	

Source: Official website

Date	Time		Score		Set 1	Set 2	Set 3
07 Oct	10:00	Myanmar	0–2	Thailand	11–21	8–21	
07 Oct	14:30	Myanmar	0–2	China	19–21	19–21	
08 Oct	10:00	Thailand	2–0	China	21–16	21–18	

==== Group B ====
Pos	Team	Pld	W	L	SF	SA	SD	Pts	Qualification
1	Vietnam	2	2	0	4	1	+3	4	Semifinals
2	Japan	2	1	1	2	2	0	2	Semifinals
3	South Korea	2	0	2	1	4	−3	0	

Source: Official website

Date	Time		Score		Set 1	Set 2	Set 3
07 Oct	10:00	Vietnam	2–0	Japan	21–13	21–17	
07 Oct	14:30	Vietnam	2–1	South Korea	13–21	21–12	15–8
08 Oct	10:00	Japan	2–0	South Korea	21–13	21–18	

=== Knockout round ===
Semifinals
8 October
Thailand	2
Japan	0
8 October
Vietnam	0
China	2

Final
9 October
Thailand	2
China	0

==== Semifinals ====
Date	Time		Score		Set 1	Set 2	Set 3
08 Oct	14:00	Thailand	2–0	Japan	21–13	21–7	
08 Oct	15:30	Vietnam	0–2	China	11–21	14–21	

==== Final ====
Date	Time		Score		Set 1	Set 2	Set 3
09 Oct	14:00	Thailand	2–0	China	21–9	22–20	
