= Sepak takraw at the 2002 Asian Games – Women's circle =

Women's comp in Busan

Women's circle at the 2002 Asian Games
- Venue: Minseok Sports Center
- Date: 30 September – 1 October 2002
- Competitors: 35 from 6 nations

Medalists
gold medal	Thailand
silver medal	Myanmar
bronze medal	South Korea
bronze medal	Vietnam

The women's circle sepak takraw competition at the 2002 Asian Games in Busan was held from 30 September to 1 October at the Minseok Sports Center in Dongseo University.

== Schedule ==
All times are Korea Standard Time (UTC+09:00)

Date	Time	Event
Monday, 30 September 2002	11:00	Preliminary round
Monday, 30 September 2002	15:00	Semifinals
Tuesday, 1 October 2002	10:00	Final

== Squads ==
China	Japan	Myanmar	South Korea
Guo Dan; Yu Ying; Bai Jie; Wang Xiaohua; Jin Yuzhu	Keiko Ishikawa; Sawa Aoki; Chiharu Oku; Masumi Aikawa; Mari Nakagawa; Azusa Negishi	Naing Naing Win; San San Htay; Mar Mar Win; San San Htay; Nu Nu Yin; Moe Moe Lwin	Lee Myung-eun; Kim Mi-hyeon; Kim Mi-jin; Na Yu-mi; Kim Sin-jung; Park Jeong-hyeon
Thailand	Vietnam		
Lampieng Poompin; Buaphan Sawatdipon; Wanwipa Seelahoi; Kobkul Chinchaiyaphum; Buarian Faisong; Warn Sochaiyan	Nguyễn Đức Thu Hiền; Lưu Thị Thanh; Vũ Hải Anh; Trần Nguyễn Anh Phương; Lê Thị Hồng Thơm; Mai Tuyết Hoa		

== Results ==
=== Preliminary round ===
Rank	Team	Score	Seed
1	Myanmar	1172	Group 1
2	Vietnam	1166	Group 2
3	South Korea	1149	Group 1
4	Thailand	957	Group 2
5	Japan	546	Group 1
6	China	0	Group 2

=== Semifinals ===
==== Group 1 ====
Rank	Team	Set			Total
Rank	Team	1	2	3	Total
1	Myanmar	1328	1404	1460	4192
2	South Korea	1180	1326	1212	3718
3	Japan	560	570	664	1794

==== Group 2 ====
Rank	Team	Set			Total
Rank	Team	1	2	3	Total
1	Thailand	1492	1585	1738	4815
2	Vietnam	1220	1367	1309	3896
3	China	0	0	0	0

=== Final ===
Rank	Team	Set			Total
Rank	Team	1	2	3	Total
1st place, gold medalist(s)	Thailand	1718	1731	1749	5198
2nd place, silver medalist(s)	Myanmar	1464	1501	1466	4431
3rd place, bronze medalist(s)	South Korea	1248	1296	1339	3883
3rd place, bronze medalist(s)	Vietnam	1197	1318	1362	3877
