= Sepak takraw at the 2002 Asian Games – Women's team regu =

Women's team regu at the 2002 Asian Games
- Venue: Minseok Sports Center
- Date: 2–6 October 2002
- Competitors: 55 from 5 nations

Medalists
gold medal	Thailand
silver medal	Vietnam
bronze medal	China
bronze medal	South Korea

The women's team regu sepak takraw competition at the 2002 Asian Games in Busan was held from 2 October to 6 October at the Minseok Sports Center in Dongseo University.

== Squads ==
China	Myanmar	South Korea	Thailand
Bai Jie; Chen Yutong; Guo Dan; Hu Zhengyi; Jin Yuzhu; Liu Lei; Sun Xiaodan; Wang Xiaohua; Yu Ying; Zhou Ronghong	Khin Cho Latt; Khin Nu Nu Phyoe; Mar Mar Win; May Zin Phyoe; Moe Moe Lwin; Naing Naing Win; Nu Nu Yin; San San Htay; San San Htay	Ahn Soon-ok; Jung Ji-yung; Kim Gun-sun; Kim Mi-hyeon; Kim Mi-jin; Kim Sin-jung; Lee Myung-eun; Na Yu-mi; Park Ah-ram; Park Jeong-hyeon; Park Keum-duk; Park Mi-ri	Tidawan Daosakul; Sahattiya Faksra; Nitinadda Kaewkamsai; Pinporn Klongbungkar; Yupayong Namboonla; Varee Nantasing; Viparat Ruangrat; Payom Srihongsa; Pudsadee Sunajarun; Anchalee Suvanmajo; Areerat Takan; Kanjana Yanyajan
Vietnam			
Đậu Bảo Hiền; Hoàng Thị Thái Xuân; Lê Thị Hồng Thơm; Lương Thị Việt Anh; Lưu Thị Thanh; Mai Tuyết Hoa; Nguyễn Đức Thu Hiền; Nguyễn Hải Thảo; Nguyễn Thị Bích Thủy; Nguyễn Thịnh Thu Ba; Trần Nguyễn Anh Phương; Trần Thị Vui			

== Results ==
All times are Korea Standard Time (UTC+09:00)

=== Preliminary round ===
==== Group A ====
Pos	Team	Pld	W	L	MF	MA	MD	Pts	Qualification
1	Thailand	1	1	0	3	0	+3	2	Semifinals
2	South Korea	1	0	1	0	3	−3	0	Semifinals

Source: Official website

Date	Time		Score		Regu 1			Regu 2			Regu 3		
Date	Time		Score		Set 1	Set 2	Set 3	Set 1	Set 2	Set 3	Set 1	Set 2	Set 3
03 Oct	10:00	South Korea	0–3	Thailand	0–2			0–2			0–2		
03 Oct	10:00	South Korea	0–3	Thailand	9–21	3–21		5–21	5–21		7–21	11–21	

==== Group B ====
Pos	Team	Pld	W	L	MF	MA	MD	Pts	Qualification
1	Vietnam	2	2	0	4	1	+3	4	Semifinals
2	China	2	1	1	2	3	−1	2	Semifinals
3	Myanmar	2	0	2	2	4	−2	0	

Source: Official website

Date	Time		Score		Regu 1			Regu 2			Regu 3		
Date	Time		Score		Set 1	Set 2	Set 3	Set 1	Set 2	Set 3	Set 1	Set 2	Set 3
02 Oct	10:00	China	2–1	Myanmar	1–2			2–0			2–0		
02 Oct	10:00	China	2–1	Myanmar	19–21	21–10	10–15	21–10	21–10		21–12	21–18	
03 Oct	13:00	Myanmar	1–2	Vietnam	1–2			2–1			0–2		
03 Oct	13:00	Myanmar	1–2	Vietnam	6–21	14–21		24–22	15–21	15–13	14–21	9–21	
04 Oct	10:00	China	0–2	Vietnam	0–2			1–2					
04 Oct	10:00	China	0–2	Vietnam	16–21	12–21		15–21	21–19	14–16			

=== Knockout round ===
Semifinals
5 October
China	0
Thailand	3
5 October
South Korea	0
Vietnam	3

Final
6 October
Thailand	2
Vietnam	0

==== Semifinals ====
Date	Time		Score		Regu 1			Regu 2			Regu 3		
Date	Time		Score		Set 1	Set 2	Set 3	Set 1	Set 2	Set 3	Set 1	Set 2	Set 3
05 Oct	13:00	China	0–3	Thailand	0–2			0–2			0–2		
05 Oct	13:00	China	0–3	Thailand	16–21	18–21		13–21	12–21		13–21	11–21	
05 Oct	16:00	South Korea	0–3	Vietnam	0–2			0–2			0–2		
05 Oct	16:00	South Korea	0–3	Vietnam	20–22	13–21		6–21	16–21		7–21	7–21	

==== Final ====
Date	Time		Score		Regu 1			Regu 2			Regu 3		
Date	Time		Score		Set 1	Set 2	Set 3	Set 1	Set 2	Set 3	Set 1	Set 2	Set 3
06 Oct	13:00	Thailand	2–0	Vietnam	2–0			2–1					
06 Oct	13:00	Thailand	2–0	Vietnam	21–12	21–7		21–10	19–21	15–9			
