= Suebsak Phunsueb =

Thai sportsperson and actor (born 1977)

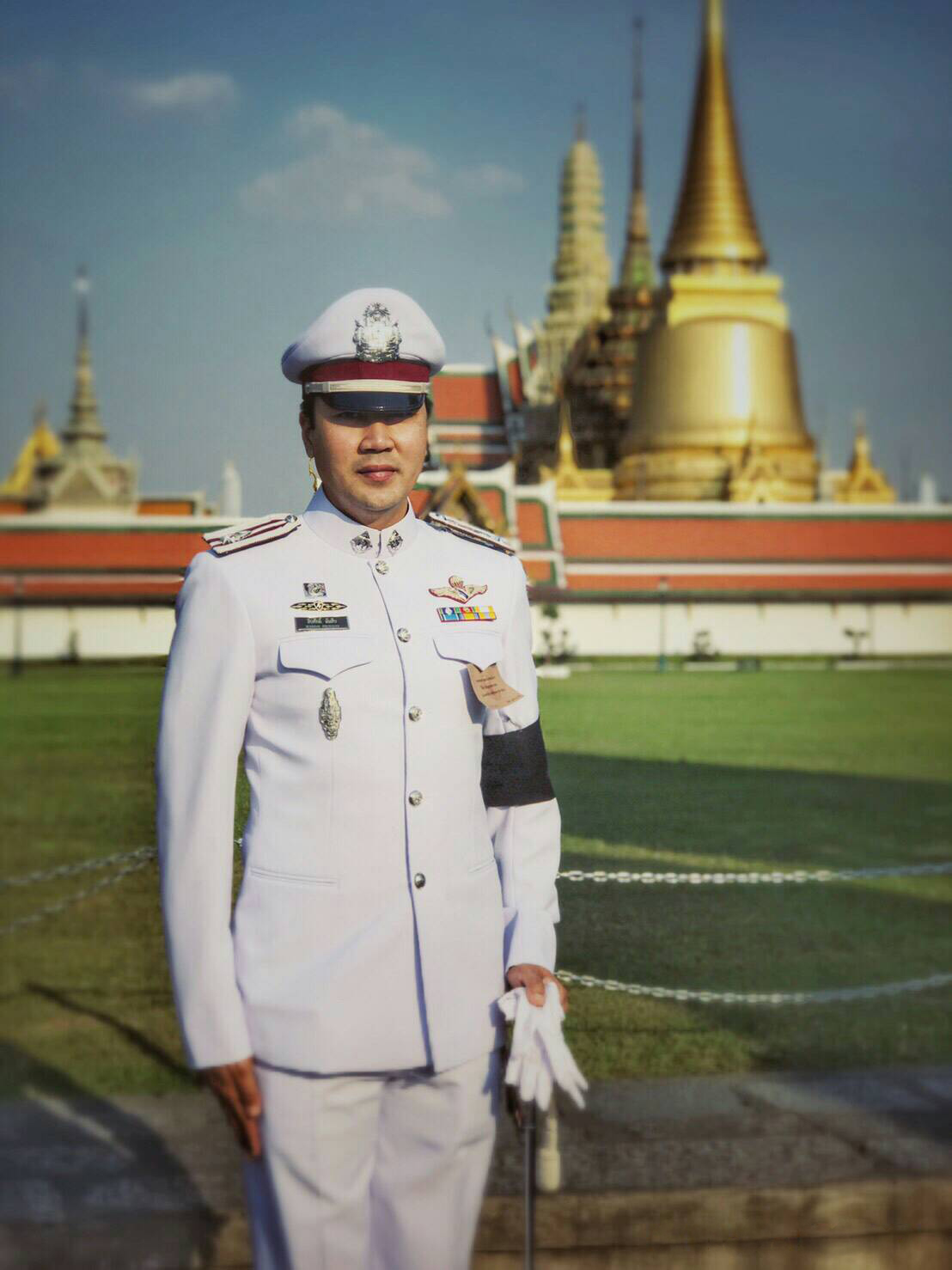
- Suebsak Phunsueb in 2017

Personal information
- Native name: สืบศักดิ์ ผันสืบ
- Born: 14 December 1977 (age 48) Ban Pong District, Ratchaburi Province, Thailand
Medal record
Men's sepak takraw
Representing Thailand
Asian Games
Gold medal – first place	1998 Bangkok	Regu
Gold medal – first place	1998 Bangkok	Team regu
Gold medal – first place	2002 Busan	Regu
Gold medal – first place	2002 Busan	Team regu
Gold medal – first place	2006 Doha	Regu
Gold medal – first place	2006 Doha	Team regu
Gold medal – first place	2010 Guangzhou	Team regu
Southeast Asian Games
Gold medal – first place	2007 Nakhon Ratchasima	Regu
Gold medal – first place	2007 Nakhon Ratchasima	Team regu
Silver medal – second place	2005 Manila	Regu

Suebsak Phansueb (Thai: สืบศักดิ์ ผันสืบ, RTGS: Suepsak Phansuep; born 14 December 1977) is a Thai sportsperson and actor. He appeared in the film Kerd ma lui (Born to Fight) as Jo, a sepak takraw (kick volleyball) player who is among several national athletes held hostage in a rural village by a drug lord's militia.

He was tasked to read the Athletes' Oath at the opening ceremony of the 2007 Southeast Asian Games, held in his country.
