= Thailand at the 2002 Asian Games =

- IOC code: THA
- NOC: National Olympic Committee of Thailand
- Website: www.olympicthai.or.th/eng (in English and Thai)

in Busan
- Medals Ranked 6th: Gold 14 Silver 19 Bronze 10 Total 43

Asian Games appearances (overview)
- 1951; 1954; 1958; 1962; 1966; 1970; 1974; 1978; 1982; 1986; 1990; 1994; 1998; 2002; 2006; 2010; 2014; 2018; 2022; 2026

Thailand participated in the 2002 Asian Games held in Busan, South Korea from 29 September to 14 October 2002. Thailand ended the games at 43 overall medals including 14 gold medals.

== Medalists ==
Medal	Name	Sport	Event
Gold	Reanchai Seerhawong, Vissanu Sophanich, Ekkachai Janthana, Sittichai Suwonprateep	Athletics	Men - 4 × 100 m relay
Gold	Somjit Jongjohor	Boxing	Flyweight
Gold	Praprut Chaithanasakun	Cue sports	English billiards singles
Gold	Praprut Chaithanasakun, Mongkhon Kanfaklang	Cue sports	English billiards doubles
Gold	Pongsiree Bunluewong	Equestrian	Eventing Individual
Gold	Suebsak Phunsueb, Sarawut Inlek, Pornchai Kaokaew, Worapot Thongsai, Poonsak Permsap	Sepaktakraw	Men's regu
Gold	Sarawut Inlek, Pornchai Kaokaew, Nattawut Panomai, Rawat Parbchompoo, Suriyan Peachan, Poonsak Permsap, Suebsak Phunsueb, Prasert Pongpung, Prawet Saejung, Chart Singrang, Kamphol Thassit, Worapot Thongsai	Sepaktakraw	Men's team
Gold	Tidawan Daosakul, Sahattiya Faksra, Nitinadda Kaewkamsai, Pinporn Klongbungkar, Yupayong Namboonla, Varee Nantasing, Viparat Ruangrat, Payom Srihongsa, Pudsadee Sunajarun, Anchalee Suvanmajo, Areerat Takan, Kanjana Yanyajan	Sepaktakraw	Women's team
Gold	Nitinadda Kaewkamsai, Kanjana Yanyajan, Tidawan Daosakul, Pinporn Klongbungkar, Sahattiya Faksra	Sepaktakraw	Women's regu
Gold	Lampieng Poompin, Buaphan Sawatdipon, Wanwipa Seelahoi, Kobkul Chinchaiyaphum, Buarian Faisong, Warn Sochaiyan	Sepaktakraw	Women's circle
Gold	Opas Ruengpanyawoodhi	Shooting	Men - Rapid Fire Pistol 25 Metres
Gold	Paradorn Srichaphan	Tennis	Men's Singles
Gold	Sanchai Chomphuphuang	Wushu	Men's Sanshou 56 kg
Gold	Angkarn Chomphuphuang	Wushu	Men's Sanshou 65 kg
