= Laos at the 1998 Asian Games =

- IOC code: LAO
- NOC: National Olympic Committee of Laos

in Bangkok
- Medals Ranked 30th: Gold 0 Silver 0 Bronze 1 Total 1

Asian Games appearances (overview)
- 1974; 1978; 1982; 1986; 1990; 1994; 1998; 2002; 2006; 2010; 2014; 2018; 2022; 2026

Laos participated in the 1998 Asian Games held in Bangkok, Thailand from 6 December 1998 to 20 December 1998. Laos won only a single bronze medal and finished at 30th position in a medal table.
