= Myanmar at the 1998 Asian Games =

- IOC code: MYA
- NOC: Myanmar Olympic Committee

in Bangkok
- Medals Ranked 20th: Gold 1 Silver 6 Bronze 4 Total 11

Asian Games appearances (overview)
- 1951; 1954; 1958; 1962; 1966; 1970; 1974; 1978; 1982; 1986; 1990; 1994; 1998; 2002; 2006; 2010; 2014; 2018; 2022; 2026

Myanmar participated in the 1998 Asian Games held in Bangkok, Thailand from December 6, 1998 to December 20, 1998. Athletes from Myanmar succeeded in winning one gold, six silvers and four bronzes, making a total of eleven medals. Myanmar finished in twentieth position in the medal table.
