= Iran at the 1998 Asian Games =

- IOC code: IRI
- NOC: National Olympic Committee of the Islamic Republic of Iran

in Bangkok
- Competitors: 199 in 24 sports
- Flag bearer: Zahra Mahroughi
- Medals Ranked 7th: Gold 10 Silver 11 Bronze 13 Total 34

Asian Games appearances (overview)
- 1951; 1954; 1958; 1962; 1966; 1970; 1974; 1978; 1982; 1986; 1990; 1994; 1998; 2002; 2006; 2010; 2014; 2018; 2022; 2026

Iran participated in the 1998 Asian Games held in the capital city of Bangkok. This country is ranked 7th with 10 gold medals in this edition of the Asiad.

== Competitors ==
Sport	Men	Women	Total
Diving			
Archery			
Athletics	8		8
Badminton	4		4
Basketball	12		12
Beach volleyball	2		2
Boxing	10		10
Canoeing			
Cycling	4		4
Equestrian	3	1	4
Fencing			
Football	20		20
Gymnastics			
Handball			
Judo	7		7
Karate	5		5
Shooting			
Squash	2		2
Swimming			
Table tennis	3		3
Taekwondo	6		6
Tennis	3		3
Water polo			
Weightlifting	8		8
Wrestling	16		16
Wushu	7		7
Total			

== Medal summary ==
=== Medals by sport ===
Sport	Gold	Silver	Bronze	Total
Athletics		1	1	2
Boxing		1	1	2
Cycling road	1			1
Cycling track			1	1
Fencing			1	1
Football	1			1
Judo		1	3	4
Karate	1	3		4
Taekwondo	1	1	3	5
Weightlifting	1	2	2	5
Wrestling	5	1	1	7
Wushu		1		1
Total	10	11	13	34

=== Medalists ===
Medal	Name	Sport	Event
Gold	Ghader Mizbani	Cycling road	Men's individual time trial
Gold	Behzad Gholampour; Mehdi Mahdavikia; Javad Zarincheh; Mohammad Khakpour; Nader Mohammadkhani; Karim Bagheri; Alireza Mansourian; Sattar Hamedani; Hamid Estili; Ali Daei; Ali Mousavi; Dariush Yazdani; Mohammad Navazi; Vahid Hashemian; Ali Karimi; Ali Janmaleki; Rasoul Khatibi; Mahmoud Fekri; Nima Nakisa; Hamid Reza Babaei	Football	Men
Gold	Alireza Katiraei	Karate	Men's kumite 75 kg
Gold	Mehdi Bibak	Taekwondo	Men's 58 kg
Gold	Shahin Nassirinia	Weightlifting	Men's 85 kg
Gold	Amir Tavakkolian	Wrestling	Men's freestyle 69 kg
Gold	Alireza Heidari	Wrestling	Men's freestyle 85 kg
Gold	Abbas Jadidi	Wrestling	Men's freestyle 97 kg
Gold	Alireza Rezaei	Wrestling	Men's freestyle 130 kg
Gold	Mehdi Sabzali	Wrestling	Men's Greco-Roman 130 kg
Silver	Hamid Sajjadi	Athletics	Men's 3000 m steeplechase
Silver	Mohammad Reza Samadi	Boxing	Men's +91 kg
Silver	Mahmoud Miran	Judo	Men's +100 kg
Silver	Alaeddin Nekoufar	Karate	Men's individual kata
Silver	Mehdi Amouzadeh	Karate	Men's kumite 70 kg
Silver	Ali Shaterzadeh	Karate	Men's kumite +75 kg
Silver	Majid Aflaki	Taekwondo	Men's 76 kg
Silver	Mohammad Hossein Barkhah	Weightlifting	Men's 77 kg
Silver	Kourosh Bagheri	Weightlifting	Men's 94 kg
Silver	Behnam Tayyebi	Wrestling	Men's freestyle 54 kg
Silver	Hossein Ojaghi	Wushu	Men's sanshou 70 kg
Bronze	Jafar Babakhani	Athletics	Men's 3000 m steeplechase
Bronze	Rouhollah Hosseini	Boxing	Men's 91 kg
Bronze	Amir Zargari	Cycling track	Men's points race
Bronze	Peyman Fakhri; Mohammad Mirmohammadi; Amir Mohaymen Rahimi; Abbas Sheikholeslami	Fencing	Men's team sabre
Bronze	Arash Miresmaeili	Judo	Men's 66 kg
Bronze	Kazem Sarikhani	Judo	Men's 81 kg
Bronze	Farhad Maabi	Judo	Men's 100 kg
Bronze	Bijan Moghanloo	Taekwondo	Men's 64 kg
Bronze	Majid Amintorabi	Taekwondo	Men's 83 kg
Bronze	Hassan Aslani	Taekwondo	Men's +83 kg
Bronze	Mehdi Panzvan	Weightlifting	Men's 56 kg
Bronze	Hossein Rezazadeh	Weightlifting	Men's +105 kg
Bronze	Mohammad Talaei	Wrestling	Men's freestyle 58 kg

== Results by event ==
=== Aquatics ===
==== Diving ====
Athlete	Event	Preliminary		Final	
Athlete	Event	Score	Rank	Score	Rank
Mohammad Reza Hedayati	Men's 3 m springboard	327.15	14	Did not advance	
Mohammad Reza Hedayati	Men's 10 m platform	—N/a		306.33	12

==== Swimming ====
Athlete	Event	Heats		Final	
Athlete	Event	Time	Rank	Time	Rank
Farshid Karami	Men's 50 m freestyle	25.74	22	Did not advance	
Hamid Reza Mobarrez	Men's 50 m freestyle	25.97	25	Did not advance	
Farshid Karami	Men's 100 m freestyle	56.25	22	Did not advance	
Hamid Reza Mobarrez	Men's 100 m freestyle	56.26	23	Did not advance	
Farshid Karami	Men's 200 m freestyle	2:09.34	22	Did not advance	
Hamed Rezakhani	Men's 200 m freestyle	2:04.48	21	Did not advance	
Hamed Rezakhani	Men's 400 m freestyle	4:24.32	16	Did not advance	
Hamed Rezakhani	Men's 1500 m freestyle	17:06.98	11	—N/a	
Majid Imani	Men's 100 m backstroke	1:06.52	18	Did not advance	
Majid Imani	Men's 200 m backstroke	2:30.11	17	Did not advance	
Pirouz Eftekhar-Manavi	Men's 100 m butterfly	1:01.76	23	Did not advance	
Hamid Reza Mobarrez	Men's 100 m butterfly	1:00.88	21	Did not advance	
Pirouz Eftekhar-Manavi	Men's 200 m butterfly	2:20.36	18	Did not advance	
Pirouz Eftekhar-Manavi	Men's 200 m individual medley	2:22.53	16 QB	Final B 2:23.37	13
Hamid Reza Mobarrez; Pirouz Eftekhar-Manavi; Farshid Karami; Hamed Rezakhani	Men's 4 × 100 m freestyle relay	3:47.00	11	Did not advance	
Hamid Reza Mobarrez; Pirouz Eftekhar-Manavi; Farshid Karami; Hamed Rezakhani	Men's 4 × 200 m freestyle relay	8:29.96	11	Did not advance	

==== Water polo ====
Men

Squad list	Preliminary round		Final round		Rank
Squad list	Group	Rank	Group I	Rank	Rank
Ahmad Hosseini; Alireza Amirian; Bahman Mouchehkiani; Kianoush Afshin; Kambiz Rakhshani-Mehr; Aram Eidipour; Mohsen Rezvani; Saeid Karimi; Masoud Rezvani; Amir Abbas Akbarnejad; Majid Gholami; Coach: Zsolt Poskay	Japan; L 7–8	2 Q	Singapore; W 13–6	5	5
Ahmad Hosseini; Alireza Amirian; Bahman Mouchehkiani; Kianoush Afshin; Kambiz Rakhshani-Mehr; Aram Eidipour; Mohsen Rezvani; Saeid Karimi; Masoud Rezvani; Amir Abbas Akbarnejad; Majid Gholami; Coach: Zsolt Poskay	Japan; L 7–8	2 Q	China; L 5–12	5	5
Ahmad Hosseini; Alireza Amirian; Bahman Mouchehkiani; Kianoush Afshin; Kambiz Rakhshani-Mehr; Aram Eidipour; Mohsen Rezvani; Saeid Karimi; Masoud Rezvani; Amir Abbas Akbarnejad; Majid Gholami; Coach: Zsolt Poskay	Kuwait; W 15–7	2 Q	Kazakhstan; L 5–13	5	5
Ahmad Hosseini; Alireza Amirian; Bahman Mouchehkiani; Kianoush Afshin; Kambiz Rakhshani-Mehr; Aram Eidipour; Mohsen Rezvani; Saeid Karimi; Masoud Rezvani; Amir Abbas Akbarnejad; Majid Gholami; Coach: Zsolt Poskay	Kuwait; W 15–7	2 Q	Uzbekistan; L 7–11	5	5

=== Archery ===
Athlete	Event	Ranking round		Round of 32	Round of 16	Quarterfinal	Semifinal	Final	Rank
Athlete	Event	Score	Rank	Round of 32	Round of 16	Quarterfinal	Semifinal	Final	Rank
Kourosh Karimzadeh	Men's individual	DNS	—	Did not advance					—
Vigen Shahbazian	Men's individual	1082	39	Did not advance					39

=== Athletics ===
Track & Field

Athlete	Event	Round 1		Final	Rank
Athlete	Event	Time	Rank	Time / Result	Rank
Mehdi Jelodarzadeh	Men's 800 m	1:50.28	2 Q	1:48.58	6
Mohammad Reza Molaei	Men's 800 m	1:52.61	5	Did not advance	13
Farhad Heidari	Men's 1500 m	3:51.12	4 Q	3:45.01	5
Jafar Babakhani	Men's 10,000 m	—N/a		29:31.19	6
Hamid Reza Fardinpour	Men's 400 m hurdles	51.94	6	Did not advance	10
Jafar Babakhani	Men's 3000 m steeplechase	—N/a		8:55.04	3rd place, bronze medalist(s)
Hamid Sajjadi	Men's 3000 m steeplechase	—N/a		8:42.53	2nd place, silver medalist(s)
Abbas Samimi	Men's discus throw	—N/a		54.80 m	5

Combined

Athlete	Event	100m	LJ	SP	HJ	400m	110mH	DT	PV	JT	1500m	Total	Rank
Ali Feizi	Men's decathlon	11.63; 725	6.58 m 716	12.25 m 622	1.92 m 731	51.24; 758	15.94; 740	36.51 m 594	4.10 m 645	57.08 m 694	4:27.52; 761	6986	8

=== Badminton ===
Athlete	Event	Round of 32	Round of 16	Quarterfinal	Semifinal	Final	Rank
Afshin Bozorgzadeh	Men's singles	Hidayat (INA); L 0–2 (5–15, 1–15)	Did not advance				17
Sadegh Karbasi	Men's singles	Shimogami (JPN); L 0–2 (7–15, 4–15)	Did not advance				17
Gholamreza Bagheri; Reza Roshanomid	Men's doubles	Bye	Zhang and Zhang (CHN); L 0–2 (1–15, 3–15)	Did not advance			9
Sadegh Karbasi; Afshin Bozorgzadeh	Men's doubles	Lee and Lin (TPE); L 0–2 (0–15, 4–15)	Did not advance				17
Gholamreza Bagheri; Afshin Bozorgzadeh; Sadegh Karbasi; Reza Roshanomid	Men's team	—N/a	Hong Kong; L 0–5 (0–2, 0–2, 0–2, 0–2, 0–2)	Did not advance			9

=== Basketball ===
Team	Event	Preliminary round			Second round				Semifinal	Final	Rank
Team	Event	Round 1	Round 2	Rank	Round 1	Round 2	Round 3	Rank	Semifinal	Final	Rank
Iran	Men	South Korea; L 75–84	Uzbekistan; W 82–78	2 Q	China; L 86–106	Chinese Taipei; L 84–86	Kazakhstan; L 55–61	4	Did not advance	7th place match United Arab Emirates; W 70–50	7
Roster: Mehdi Davanizadeh; Saeid Khani; Mohammad Kasaeipour; Ali Akbar Shirian; Touraj Emdadi; Ali Tofigh; Mehran Hatami; Behzad Afradi; Hamid Kashani; Hamid Reza Kolasangiani; Mohsen Sadeghzadeh; Safa Ali Kamalian; Coach: Enayatollah Atashi

=== Boxing ===
Athlete	Event	Round of 32	Round of 16	Quarterfinal	Semifinal	Final	Rank
Akbar Ahadi	Men's 54 kg	Sheikhan (SYR); W 15–6	Tulyakov (UZB); L 4–12	Did not advance			9
Bijan Batmani	Men's 57 kg	—N/a	Hamidi (SYR); W 9–4	Canoy (PHI); L 4–5	Did not advance		5
Hassan Moradnejad	Men's 60 kg	—N/a	Barriga (PHI); L 7–8	Did not advance			9
Babak Moghimi	Men's 63.5 kg	—N/a	Papilaya (INA); L 10–18	Did not advance			9
Anoushiravan Nourian	Men's 67 kg	—N/a	Bae (KOR); L 4–5	Did not advance			9
Esfandiar Mohammadi	Men's 71 kg	—N/a	Bye	Nanakon (THA); L 7–13	Did not advance		5
Ebrahim Mousavi	Men's 75 kg	—N/a	Burba (KAZ); L RET	Did not advance			9
Ali Darvish	Men's 81 kg	—N/a	Al-Yousef (SYR); W 20–13	Lee (KOR); L 7–18	Did not advance		5
Rouhollah Hosseini	Men's 91 kg	—N/a		Ma (CHN); W 20–12	Chagaev (UZB); L 2–17	Did not advance	3rd place, bronze medalist(s)
Mohammad Reza Samadi	Men's +91 kg	—N/a		Abuduxikeer (CHN); W 10–3	Hussain (PAK); W 15–8	Dildabekov (KAZ); L KO	2nd place, silver medalist(s)

=== Canoeing ===
Athlete	Event	Heat		Semifinal		Final	Rank
Athlete	Event	Time	Rank	Time	Rank	Time	Rank
Elias Eghlimi; Mahmoud Reza Zarinderakht	Men's C2 500 m	1:55.79	4 QS	1:55.75	4	Did not advance	8
Elias Eghlimi; Mahmoud Reza Zarinderakht	Men's C2 1000 m	4:46.25	5 QS	4:14.05	4	Did not advance	8
Hossein Fathalizadeh	Men's K1 500 m	1:46.79	2 QS	1:52.50	2 Q	DSQ	—
Alireza Mohammadi	Men's K1 1000 m	4:38.88	3 QS	3:59.86	6	Did not advance	9
Mohsen Milad; Alireza Sohrabian	Men's K2 500 m	1:44.62	3 QS	1:38.02	3 Q	1:52.11	6
Nader Hedayati; Alireza Mohammadi	Men's K2 1000 m	3:56.95	2 QF	Bye		4:04.11	5
Hossein Fathalizadeh; Nader Hedayati; Mohsen Milad; Alireza Sohrabian	Men's K4 1000 m	3:16.12	2 QS	3:11.58	3 Q	3:26.54	4
Fariba Khaledi	Women's K1 500 m	2:23.90	5 QS	2:29.13	6	Did not advance	10
Farahnaz Amirshaghaghi; Negin Farjad	Women's K2 500 m	2:07.96	5 QS	2:15.59	6	Did not advance	10
Farahnaz Amirshaghaghi; Fariba Khaledi; Negin Farjad; Fatemeh Bibak	Women's K4 500 m	DNF	—	Did not advance			—

=== Cycling ===
==== Road ====
Athlete	Event	Time	Rank
Mehran Esmaeili	Men's road race	4:44:17	18
Ahad Kazemi	Men's road race	4:41:21	9
Majid Nasseri	Men's road race	4:44:17	17
Ahad Kazemi	Men's individual time trial	1:07:07.96	16
Ghader Mizbani	Men's individual time trial	1:03:16.94	1st place, gold medalist(s)

==== Track ====
Men

Athlete	Event	Qualification		Quarterfinal	Semifinal	Final	Rank
Athlete	Event	Time	Rank	Quarterfinal	Semifinal	Final	Rank
Alireza Farid-Jafarnejad	Sprint	11.540	8 Q	(Japan) Kamiyama; L 0–2	Did not advance		5
Alireza Farid-Jafarnejad	1 km time trial	N/A				1:08.851	5
Ghader Mizbani	4 km individual pursuit	4:57.148	10	Did not advance			10
Amir Zargari	4 km individual pursuit	4:59.170	11	Did not advance			11
Amir Zargari	40 km points race	N/A				21 pts	Bronze medal
Alireza Haghi	40 km points race	N/A				3 pts	13
Mousa Arbati; Hossein Askari; Alireza Haghi; Hassan Maleki	4 km team pursuit	4:35.962	5 Q	South Korea; L 4:34.805–4:32.394	Did not advance		5

=== Equestrian ===
Jumping

Athlete	Horse	Event	Qualification		Final		Rank
Athlete	Horse	Event	Score	Rank	Penalty	Rank	Rank
Arsia Ardalan	Outrageous	Individual	83.50	13 Q	8.00	6	6
Tara Ardalan	Bardame	Individual	74.50	23 Q	did not finish		–
Khodadad Aslani	Soldier	Individual	42.00	35	did not advance		35
Farrokh Moshar	Gallypoli	Individual	15.00	43	did not advance		43
Arsia Ardalan; Tara Ardalan; Khodadad Aslani; Farrokh Moshar	Outrageous; Bardame; Soldier; Gallypoli	Team	N/A		130.00 pts	7	7

=== Fencing ===
Épée

Athlete	Event	Pool round		Round of 32	Round of 16	Quarterfinal	Semifinal	Final	Rank
Athlete	Event	Results	Rank	Round of 32	Round of 16	Quarterfinal	Semifinal	Final	Rank
Siamak Feiz-Asgari	Men's individual	Boodratana (THA) W 5–2; Dimov (KAZ) W 5–3; Gomez (PHI) W 5–4; Lee (KOR) L 3–5; Takiguchi (JPN) L 2–5; Wang (CHN) L 4–5	14 Q	Gomez (PHI); W 15–12	Wang (CHN); L 12–15	Did not advance			12
Farhad Rezaei	Men's individual	Al-Zamel (KUW) W 5–2; Segui (PHI) W 5–4; Shabalin (KAZ) W 5–3; Smerdin (KGZ) L 4–5; Xiao (CHN) L 4–5; Yang (KOR) L 1–5	14 Q	Rathprasert (THA); W 15–14	Yang (KOR); L 5–15	Did not advance			13
Ghodratollah Rezaei	Men's individual	Malallah (KUW) L 3–5; Kato (JPN) L 4–5; Poddubny (KGZ) L 1–5; Rathprasert (THA) L 2–5; Zhao (CHN) L 3–5	25 Q	Shabalin (KAZ); L 13–15	Did not advance				26
Siamak Feiz-Asgari; Farhad Rezaei; Ghodratollah Rezaei	Men's team	—N/a			Bye	Kazakhstan; L 35–45	Did not advance		6

Foil

Athlete	Event	Pool round		Round of 32	Round of 16	Quarterfinal	Semifinal	Final	Rank
Athlete	Event	Results	Rank	Round of 32	Round of 16	Quarterfinal	Semifinal	Final	Rank
Keivan Javanshir	Men's individual	Gubaidullin (KAZ) W 5–2; Lin (CHN) L 1–5; Mohammad (KUW) L 4–5; Tuntiruk (THA) L 2–5; Wong (HKG) L 2–5; You (KOR) L 3–5	25 Q	Shahrayen (KUW); L 9–15	Did not advance				25
Mohammad Mirmohammadi	Men's individual	Shahrayen (KUW) L 3–5; Endriano (PHI) L 4–5; Kim (KOR) L 1–5; Okazaki (JPN) L 0–5; Tsui (HKG) W 5–1	21 Q	Lin (CHN); L 7–15	Did not advance				21
Hamid Reza Veisi	Men's individual	Cena (PHI) W 5–4; Fujii (JPN) L 2–5; Kim (KOR) L 0–5; Kolganov (KAZ) L 3–5; Udomsuk (THA) W 5–0; Wang (CHN) L 1–5	19 Q	Al-Shammari (KUW); W 15–10	Dong (CHN); L 4–15	Did not advance			16
Keivan Javanshir; Mohammad Mirmohammadi; Hamid Reza Veisi	Men's team	—N/a			Bye	South Korea; L 18–45	Did not advance		7

Sabre

Athlete	Event	Pool round		Round of 64	Round of 32	Round of 16	Quarterfinal	Semifinal	Final	Rank
Athlete	Event	Results	Rank	Round of 64	Round of 32	Round of 16	Quarterfinal	Semifinal	Final	Rank
Peyman Fakhri	Men's individual	Faisal (KUW) W 5–0; Guo (CHN) L 4–5; Huang (TPE) W 5–1; Raimbekov (KAZ) L 3–5; Savinkov (UZB) W 5–3	13 Q	Bye	Zhang (CHN); L 14–15	Did not advance				19
Amir Mohaymen Rahimi	Men's individual	Al-Shamlan (KUW) W 5–2; Yegorov (KAZ) L 1–5; Huang (TPE) L 1–5; Kong (HKG) L 3–5; Shimoda (JPN) L 4–5	26 Q	Bye	Limkangwanmongkol (THA); W 15–13	Tsel (KAZ); W 15–11	Seo (KOR); W 15–14	Guo (CHN); L 6–15	3rd place match Zhang (CHN); L 4–15	4
Abbas Sheikholeslami	Men's individual	Al-Fadhli (KUW) W 5–2; Chuensiwa (THA) W 5–2; Munekata (JPN) L 2–5; Segui (PHI) W 5–1; Seo (KOR) L 4–5; Yan (CHN) L 1–5	17 Q	Bye	Lee (TPE); W 15–7	Ko (KOR); L 11–15	Did not advance			15
Peyman Fakhri; Mohammad Mirmohammadi; Amir Mohaymen Rahimi; Abbas Sheikholeslami	Men's team	—N/a				Bye	Uzbekistan; W 45–38	China; L 30–45	3rd place match Kazakhstan; W 45–43	3rd place, bronze medalist(s)

=== Football ===
Team	Event	Preliminary round			Second round				Quarterfinal	Semifinal	Final	Rank
Team	Event	Round 1	Round 2	Rank	Round 1	Round 2	Round 3	Rank	Quarterfinal	Semifinal	Final	Rank
Iran	Men	Kazakhstan; W 2–0	Laos; W 6–1	1 Q	Oman; L 2–4	Tajikistan; W 5–0	China; W 2–1	2 Q	Uzbekistan; W 4–0	China; W 1–0	Kuwait; W 2–0	1st place, gold medalist(s)
Roster: Behzad Gholampour; Mehdi Mahdavikia; Javad Zarincheh; Mohammad Khakpour; Nader Mohammadkhani; Karim Bagheri; Alireza Mansourian; Sattar Hamedani; Hamid Estili; Ali Daei; Ali Mousavi; Dariush Yazdani; Mohammad Navazi; Vahid Hashemian; Ali Karimi; Ali Janmaleki; Rasoul Khatibi; Mahmoud Fekri; Nima Nakisa; Hamid Reza Babaei; Coach: Mansour Pourheidari

=== Gymnastics ===
==== Artistic ====
Men

Athlete	Event	Score	Rank
Mahmoud Arab	Individual all-around	47.175	21
Mahan Bajrang	Individual all-around	48.750	19
Mohammad Hadi Ghasemi	Individual all-around	46.650	22
Mahmoud Arab; Mahan Bajrang; Arman Bakhtiarian; Mohammad Hadi Ghasemi; Gholamreza Alizadeh	Team	186.450	8

=== Handball ===
Men

Squad list	Main round		Semifinal	Final	Rank
Squad list	Group B	Rank	Semifinal	Final	Rank
Mohsen Fakhar; Majid Rahimizadeh; Ahmad Reza Faghihi; Mohsen Taheri; Shahdad Mortaji; Ali Zokaei; Hamid Sadeghi; Armen Amirkhanian; Javad Hashemian; Mehdi Azad-Manjiri; Hassan Khosh-Shiveh; Farid Alimoradi; Coach: Ghasem Shabanpour	Qatar; W 27–25	2 Q	Kuwait; L 26–32	3rd place match Japan; L 23–28	4
Mohsen Fakhar; Majid Rahimizadeh; Ahmad Reza Faghihi; Mohsen Taheri; Shahdad Mortaji; Ali Zokaei; Hamid Sadeghi; Armen Amirkhanian; Javad Hashemian; Mehdi Azad-Manjiri; Hassan Khosh-Shiveh; Farid Alimoradi; Coach: Ghasem Shabanpour	South Korea; L 26–40	2 Q	Kuwait; L 26–32	3rd place match Japan; L 23–28	4
Mohsen Fakhar; Majid Rahimizadeh; Ahmad Reza Faghihi; Mohsen Taheri; Shahdad Mortaji; Ali Zokaei; Hamid Sadeghi; Armen Amirkhanian; Javad Hashemian; Mehdi Azad-Manjiri; Hassan Khosh-Shiveh; Farid Alimoradi; Coach: Ghasem Shabanpour	China; W 24–21	2 Q	Kuwait; L 26–32	3rd place match Japan; L 23–28	4

=== Judo ===
Athlete	Event	Round of 32	Round of 16	Quarterfinal	Semifinal	Repechage	Final	Rank
Masoud Haji Akhondzadeh	Men's 60 kg	Suleimenov (KAZ); L	Did not advance	Repechage; Mukhtarov (UZB); L	Did not advance			13
Arash Miresmaeili	Men's 66 kg	—N/a	Baglayev (KAZ); L	Did not advance	Repechage; Abdullah (KUW); W	Repechage; Lucero (PHI); W	3rd place match Hwang (KOR); W	3rd place, bronze medalist(s)
Behrouz Parhizgar	Men's 73 kg	Bye	Alpysbayev (KAZ); W	Nakamura (JPN); L	Repechage; Shturbabin (UZB); L	Did not advance		9
Kazem Sarikhani	Men's 81 kg	Lin (TPE); W	Turayev (UZB); W	Ochirbat (MGL); W	Kwak (PRK); L	Bye	3rd place match Solanki (IND); W	3rd place, bronze medalist(s)
Ali Chamanpa	Men's 90 kg	—N/a	Bye	Ao (CHN); L	Repechage; Al-Hamwy (SYR); W WO	Repechage; Shakimov (KAZ); L	Did not advance	7
Farhad Maabi	Men's 100 kg	—N/a	Bye	Ganbold (MGL); W	Bagdasarov (UZB); L	Bye	3rd place match Sergeyev (KGZ); W	3rd place, bronze medalist(s)
Mahmoud Miran	Men's +100 kg	—N/a	Rakhimov (TJK); W	Pan (CHN); W	Berduta (KAZ); W	Bye	Shinohara (JPN); L 0001–1001	2nd place, silver medalist(s)

=== Karate ===
Kata

Athlete	Event	Preliminary		Final	
Athlete	Event	Score	Rank	Score	Rank
Alaeddin Nekoufar	Men's individual	36.4	2 Q	41.8	2nd place, silver medalist(s)

Kumite

Athlete	Event	Round of 16	Quarterfinal	Semifinal	Final	Rank
Majid Abdolhosseini	Men's 65 kg	Al-Farran (JOR); W 6–0	Lei (MAC); W 6–1	Narazaki (JPN); L 5–6	3rd place match Đỗ (VIE); L 3–6	5
Mehdi Amouzadeh	Men's 70 kg	Mariano (PHI); W 1–0	Somchaichana (THA); W 3–0	Shiina (JPN); W 6–2	Muniandy (MAS); L 1–6	2nd place, silver medalist(s)
Alireza Katiraei	Men's 75 kg	Roldan (PHI); W 6–0	Ali (SYR); W 5–0	Arivalagan (MAS); W 3–0	Niki (JPN); W 1–0	1st place, gold medalist(s)
Ali Shaterzadeh	Men's +75 kg	Chu (TPE); W 4–1	Syarief (INA); W 4–3	Khajaisornsit (THA); W	Al-Hammad (KUW); L 1–6	2nd place, silver medalist(s)

=== Shooting ===
Men

Athlete	Event	Final	
Athlete	Event	Score	Rank
Navid Bagheri	Centre fire pistol	551	37
Ahmad Samaei	Centre fire pistol	569	30
Hassan Zolfaghari	Centre fire pistol	521	41
Navid Bagheri; Ahmad Samaei; Hassan Zolfaghari	Centre fire pistol team	1641	12

Women

Athlete	Event	Qualification		Final		
Athlete	Event	Score	Rank	Score	Total	Rank
Manijeh Kazemi	Sport pistol		EL			
Manijeh Kazemi	Air pistol	363	26	Did not advance		
Marzieh Mehrabi	Sport pistol		EL			
Marzieh Mehrabi	Air pistol	366	21	Did not advance		
Hourieh Seyed-Derakhshani	Sport pistol		EL			
Hourieh Seyed-Derakhshani	Air pistol	359	31	Did not advance		
Lida Fariman	Air rifle	382	31	Did not advance		
Elham Hashemi	Air rifle	384	27	Did not advance		
Elham Hashemi	Sport rifle prone	N/A		572		34
Elham Hashemi	Sport rifle three positions	526	39	Did not advance		
Raheleh Kheirollahzadeh	Air rifle	385	25	Did not advance		
Kobra Allahkarami	Sport rifle prone	N/A		576		25
Kobra Allahkarami	Sport rifle three positions	521	40	Did not advance		
Zahra Mahroughi	Sport rifle prone	N/A		579		17
Zahra Mahroughi	Sport rifle three positions	545	37	Did not advance		
Manijeh Kazemi; Marzieh Mehrabi; Hourieh Seyed-Derakhshani	Sport pistol team	N/A		1646		9
Manijeh Kazemi; Marzieh Mehrabi; Hourieh Seyed-Derakhshani	Air pistol team	N/A		1088		8
Lida Fariman; Elham Hashemi; Raheleh Kheirollahzadeh	Air rifle team	N/A		1151		10
Kobra Allahkarami; Elham Hashemi; Zahra Mahroughi	Sport rifle prone team	N/A		1727		7
Kobra Allahkarami; Elham Hashemi; Zahra Mahroughi	Sport rifle three positions team	N/A		1592		13

=== Squash ===
Athlete	Event	Round of 32	Round of 16	Quarterfinal	Semifinal	Final	Rank
Shahyar Dolatshahi	Men's singles	Watanabe (JPN); L 0–3 (0–9, 2–9, 3–9)	Did not advance				17
Jamshad Pourtork	Men's singles	Al-Hijazi (JOR); L 0–3 (4–9, 0–9, 5–9)	Did not advance				17

=== Table tennis ===
Men

Athlete	Event	Round of 64	Round of 32	Round of 16	Quarterfinal	Semifinal	Final	Rank
Amin Eskandari	Singles	(Macau) Ho; L 2–3	Did not advance					33
Behnam Rahmatpanah	Singles	Bye		(China) Kong; L 0–3	Did not advance			9
Mohammad Reza Akhlaghpasand; Behnam Rahmatpanah	Doubles	N/A	(Thailand) Sanguansin and Ariyachontima; L 1–2	Did not advance				17

Athlete	Event	Preliminary		Quarterfinal	Semifinal	Final	Rank
Athlete	Event	Group A	Rank	Quarterfinal	Semifinal	Final	Rank
Mohammad Reza Akhlaghpasand; Amin Eskandari; Behnam Rahmatpanah	Team	Maldives; W 3–0	2 Q	China; L 0–3	did not advance		5
Mohammad Reza Akhlaghpasand; Amin Eskandari; Behnam Rahmatpanah	Team	Japan; L 0–3	2 Q	China; L 0–3	did not advance		5

=== Taekwondo ===
Athlete	Event	Round of 32	Round of 16	Quarterfinal	Semifinal	Final	Rank
Mehdi Bibak	Men's 58 kg	Bye	Kosianenko (TJK); W	Huang (TPE); W	Liu (CHN); W	Yodanyamaneewong (THA); W	1st place, gold medalist(s)
Bijan Moghanloo	Men's 64 kg	—N/a	Al-Enezi (KUW); W	Dong (CHN); W	Kang (KOR); L 1–5	Did not advance	3rd place, bronze medalist(s)
Hadi Saei	Men's 70 kg	—N/a	Noikoed (THA); L	Did not advance			9
Majid Aflaki	Men's 76 kg	—N/a		Jumpathong (THA); W	Sagindykov (KAZ); W RET	Ryu (KOR); L KO (2–3)	2nd place, silver medalist(s)
Majid Amintorabi	Men's 83 kg	—N/a	Bye	Younes (LIB); W	Kang (KOR); L	Did not advance	3rd place, bronze medalist(s)
Hassan Aslani	Men's +83 kg	—N/a		Halim (INA); W	Kim (KOR); L 0–3	Did not advance	3rd place, bronze medalist(s)

=== Tennis ===
Athlete	Event	Round of 32	Round of 16	Quarterfinal	Semifinal	Final	Rank
Ramin Raziani	Men's singles	Erdenebileg (MGL); W 2–0 (6–0, 6–0)	Yoon (KOR); L 0–2 (3–6, 3–6)	Did not advance			9
Akbar Taheri	Men's singles	Junio (PHI); L 0–2 (4–6, 3–6)	Did not advance				17
Ramin Raziani; Akbar Taheri	Men's doubles	Bye	Kirtane and Kannan (IND); L 0–2 (4–6, 2–6)	Did not advance			9
Shahab Hassani; Ramin Raziani; Akbar Taheri	Men's team	—N/a	Chinese Taipei; L 0–3	Did not advance			9

=== Volleyball ===
==== Beach ====
Athlete	Event	Double elimination round					Semifinal	Final	Rank
Athlete	Event	Round 1	Round 2	Round 3	Round 4	Round 5	Semifinal	Final	Rank
Reza Bonyadi; Ebrahim Hosseinpour	Men	Mashebin and Aristarkhov (KAZ); W 15–3	Thongkamnerd and Sawangreung (THA); L 5–15	Bye	Gu and Li (CHN); L 7–15	Did not advance	Did not advance		7

=== Weightlifting ===
Athlete	Event	Snatch		Clean & Jerk		Total	
Athlete	Event	Result	Rank	Result	Rank	Result	Rank
Mehdi Panzvan	Men's 56 kg	122.5 GR	1	145.0	4	267.5	3rd place, bronze medalist(s)
Mehran Azari	Men's 77 kg	147.5	8	180.0	7	327.5	9
Mohammad Hossein Barkhah	Men's 77 kg	155.0	4	197.5 GR	1	352.5	2nd place, silver medalist(s)
Shahin Nassirinia	Men's 85 kg	170.0 GR	1	210.0 GR	1	380.0 GR	1st place, gold medalist(s)
Kourosh Bagheri	Men's 94 kg	175.0	2	202.5	5	377.5	2nd place, silver medalist(s)
Kamal Mousavi	Men's 105 kg	170.0	6	205.0	6	375.0	6
Hossein Tavakkoli	Men's 105 kg	175.0	5	215.0	5	390.0	5
Hossein Rezazadeh	Men's +105 kg	187.5	3	228.0	3	415.0	3rd place, bronze medalist(s)

=== Wrestling ===
Freestyle

Athlete	Event	Elimination round					Final	Rank
Athlete	Event	Round 1	Round 2	Round 3	Round 4	Round 5	Final	Rank
Behnam Tayyebi	Men's 54 kg	Tanabe (JPN); W 3–2	Mamyrov (KAZ); W 3–0	Achilov (UZB); W 8–5	Bye		Jin (PRK); L 2–3	2nd place, silver medalist(s)
Mohammad Talaei	Men's 58 kg	Boburbekov (KGZ); W 8–0	Mambetov (KAZ); L 2–3	Bye	Repechage; Jung (KOR); W 3–2	Repechage; Ibadov (UZB); W 9–0	3rd place match Mambetov (KAZ); W 5–2	3rd place, bronze medalist(s)
Mehdi Kaveh	Men's 63 kg	Dengelbayev (KAZ); W 8–0	Madjinov (KGZ); W 4–3	Jang (KOR); L 0–7	Bye	Repechage; Su (CHN); L 2–3	Did not advance	6
Amir Tavakkolian	Men's 69 kg	Jo (PRK); W 3–1	Kupeev (UZB); W 4–2	Katsu (JPN); W 9–0	Bye		Al-Osta (SYR); W 2–1	1st place, gold medalist(s)
Pejman Dorostkar	Men's 76 kg	Veliyev (KAZ); W 3–2	Han (PRK); W 0–0	Moon (KOR); L 0–2	Bye	Repechage; Izabekov (KGZ); L 0–3	Did not advance	5
Alireza Heidari	Men's 85 kg	Kipituck (THA); W Fall (7–0)	Yang (KOR); W 1–1	Gankhuyag (MGL); W 13–9	Bye	—N/a	Katinovasov (UZB); W 5–3	1st place, gold medalist(s)
Abbas Jadidi	Men's 97 kg	Ba (CHN); W 10–0	Bye	Fraev (UZB); W 4–0	Bye	—N/a	Sumiyaabazar (MGL); W 3–0	1st place, gold medalist(s)
Alireza Rezaei	Men's 130 kg	Ösökhbayar (MGL); W 4–0	Bye	Obata (JPN); W 10–0	Bye	—N/a	Kaysinov (UZB); W 2–0	1st place, gold medalist(s)

Greco-Roman

Athlete	Event	Elimination round					Final	Rank
Athlete	Event	Round 1	Round 2	Round 3	Round 4	Round 5	Final	Rank
Ali Ashkani	Men's 54 kg	Suwanna (THA); W 10–0	Wang (CHN); L 4–9	Repechage; Aripov (UZB); L 2–3	Did not advance		Did not advance	8
Sardar Pashaei	Men's 58 kg	Tumasis (PHI); W 12–0	Bye	Khudoyberdiev (UZB); L 5–8	Repechage; Nishimi (JPN); W 3–2	—N/a	3rd place match Sheng (CHN); L 0–3	4
Parviz Zeidvand	Men's 63 kg	Mamedow (TKM); W 3–0	Yi (CHN); L 1–2, DSQ	Did not advance			Did not advance	—
Gholam Hossein Pezeshki	Men's 69 kg	Al-Saleh (SYR); W 5–0	Bye	Manukyan (KAZ); L 0–10	Repechage; Jong (PRK); L 2–3	—N/a	Did not advance	6
Mehdi Rahimi	Men's 76 kg	Baiseitov (KAZ); L 0–4	Repechage; Al-Ken (SYR); L 3–11	Did not advance		—N/a	Did not advance	10
Behrouz Jamshidi	Men's 85 kg	Park (KOR); L 2–4	Repechage; Rejepow (TKM); W 4–0	Bye	Repechage; Achilov (UZB); W 7–0	—N/a	3rd place match Yokoyama (JPN); L 2–4	4
Mohammad Sharabiani	Men's 97 kg	Matviyenko (KAZ); L 0–3	Repechage; Iwabuchi (JPN); W 7–0	Bye	Repechage; Park (KOR); L 0–4	—N/a	Did not advance	6
Mehdi Sabzali	Men's 130 kg	Bye	Zhao (CHN); W 0–0	Hamaue (JPN); W 3–0	Bye	—N/a	Kuziev (UZB); W 6–3	1st place, gold medalist(s)

=== Wushu ===
Taolu

Athlete	Event	Score	Rank
Mohammad Hossein Farshbaf	Men's changquan combined		17
Habib Zareei	Men's changquan combined	26.57	16

Sanshou

Athlete	Event	Round of 16	Quarterfinal	Semifinal	Final	Rank
Alireza Saadat	Men's 52 kg	Chulhang (PHI); L 0–2	Did not advance			9
Alireza Rouzbahani	Men's 56 kg	Zheng (CHN); L 0–2	Did not advance			9
Ali Khodaei	Men's 60 kg	—N/a	Zhunuspekov (KAZ); L 1–2	Did not advance		5
Mansour Norouzi	Men's 65 kg	Bye	Zhamash (KAZ); L 1–2	Did not advance		5
Hossein Ojaghi	Men's 70 kg	—N/a	Bye	Lumabas (PHI); W 2–0	Xiao (CHN); L 1–2	2nd place, silver medalist(s)
