= Boxing at the 1998 Asian Games =

Boxing competitions

- Venue: Land Sports Complex
- Dates: 7–18 December 1998
- Competitors: 159 from 27 nations

The Boxing Tournament at the 1998 Asian Games was held at the IMPACT Arena in Bangkok, Thailand from 7 December to 18 December 1998.

The competition included only men's events.

== Schedule ==
| P | Round of 32 | R | Round of 16 | ¼ | Quarterfinals | ½ | Semifinals | F | Final |

| Event↓/Date → | 7th Mon | 8th Tue | 9th Wed | 10th Thu | 11th Fri | 12th Sat | 13th Sun | 14th Mon | 15th Tue | 16th Wed | 17th Thu | 18th Fri |
|---|---|---|---|---|---|---|---|---|---|---|---|---|
| Men's 48 kg | R | | | ¼ | | | | ½ | | | F | |
| Men's 51 kg | P | R | | | ¼ | | | | ½ | | | F |
| Men's 54 kg | P | | R | | | ¼ | | ½ | | | F | |
| Men's 57 kg | | R | | | | | ¼ | | ½ | | | F |
| Men's 60 kg | | R | | ¼ | | | | ½ | | | F | |
| Men's 63.5 kg | | | R | | ¼ | | | | ½ | | | F |
| Men's 67 kg | R | | | | | ¼ | | ½ | | | F | |
| Men's 71 kg | | | R | | | | ¼ | | ½ | | | F |
| Men's 75 kg | | R | | ¼ | | | | ½ | | | F | |
| Men's 81 kg | | | R | | ¼ | | | | ½ | | | F |
| Men's 91 kg | | | | | | ¼ | | ½ | | | F | |
| Men's +91 kg | | | | | | | ¼ | | ½ | | | F |

== Medalists ==
| Event | Gold | Silver | Bronze |
|---|---|---|---|
| Light flyweight (48 kg) | Suban Pannon; Thailand | Yang Xiangzhong; China | Pak Chun; North Korea |
| Light flyweight (48 kg) | Suban Pannon; Thailand | Yang Xiangzhong; China | Kim Sung-soo; South Korea |
| Flyweight (51 kg) | Pramuansak Phosuwan; Thailand | Hermensen Ballo; Indonesia | Haider Ali; Pakistan |
| Flyweight (51 kg) | Pramuansak Phosuwan; Thailand | Hermensen Ballo; Indonesia | Choi Jin-woo; South Korea |
| Bantamweight (54 kg) | Dingko Singh; India | Timur Tulyakov; Uzbekistan | Sontaya Wongprates; Thailand |
| Bantamweight (54 kg) | Dingko Singh; India | Timur Tulyakov; Uzbekistan | Marat Mazimbayev; Kazakhstan |
| Featherweight (57 kg) | Somluck Kamsing; Thailand | Tulkunbay Turgunov; Uzbekistan | Eric Canoy; Philippines |
| Featherweight (57 kg) | Somluck Kamsing; Thailand | Tulkunbay Turgunov; Uzbekistan | Norihisa Tomimoto; Japan |
| Lightweight (60 kg) | Pongsith Wiangwiset; Thailand | Timur Suleymanov; Uzbekistan | Shin Eun-chul; South Korea |
| Lightweight (60 kg) | Pongsith Wiangwiset; Thailand | Timur Suleymanov; Uzbekistan | Tümentsetsegiin Üitümen; Mongolia |
| Light welterweight (63.5 kg) | Muhammad Abdullaev; Uzbekistan | Willem Papilaya; Indonesia | Pongsak Rientuanthong; Thailand |
| Light welterweight (63.5 kg) | Muhammad Abdullaev; Uzbekistan | Willem Papilaya; Indonesia | Densmaagiin Enkhsaikhan; Mongolia |
| Welterweight (67 kg) | Parkpoom Jangphonak; Thailand | Nurzhan Smanov; Kazakhstan | Nariman Ataev; Uzbekistan |
| Welterweight (67 kg) | Parkpoom Jangphonak; Thailand | Nurzhan Smanov; Kazakhstan | Bae Ho-jo; South Korea |
| Light middleweight (71 kg) | Yermakhan Ibraimov; Kazakhstan | Im Jung-bin; South Korea | Komgrit Nanakon; Thailand |
| Light middleweight (71 kg) | Yermakhan Ibraimov; Kazakhstan | Im Jung-bin; South Korea | Batmönkhiin Enkhbayar; Mongolia |
| Middleweight (75 kg) | Vyacheslav Burba; Kazakhstan | Dilshod Yarbekov; Uzbekistan | Mohammad Kaddour; Syria |
| Middleweight (75 kg) | Vyacheslav Burba; Kazakhstan | Dilshod Yarbekov; Uzbekistan | Kim Ho-chul; South Korea |
| Light heavyweight (81 kg) | Sergey Mihaylov; Uzbekistan | Lee Seung-bae; South Korea | Gurcharan Singh; India |
| Light heavyweight (81 kg) | Sergey Mihaylov; Uzbekistan | Lee Seung-bae; South Korea | Shaukat Ali; Pakistan |
| Heavyweight (91 kg) | Ruslan Chagaev; Uzbekistan | Muzaffar Iqbal Mirza; Pakistan | Mohammad Abukhadijeh; Jordan |
| Heavyweight (91 kg) | Ruslan Chagaev; Uzbekistan | Muzaffar Iqbal Mirza; Pakistan | Rouhollah Hosseini; Iran |
| Super heavyweight (+91 kg) | Mukhtarkhan Dildabekov; Kazakhstan | Mohammad Reza Samadi; Iran | Lazizbek Zokirov; Uzbekistan |
| Super heavyweight (+91 kg) | Mukhtarkhan Dildabekov; Kazakhstan | Mohammad Reza Samadi; Iran | Shahid Hussain; Pakistan |

== Medal table ==
| Rank | Nation | Gold | Silver | Bronze | Total |
|---|---|---|---|---|---|
| 1 | Thailand (THA) | 5 | 0 | 3 | 8 |
| 2 | Uzbekistan (UZB) | 3 | 4 | 2 | 9 |
| 3 | Kazakhstan (KAZ) | 3 | 1 | 1 | 5 |
| 4 | India (IND) | 1 | 0 | 1 | 2 |
| 5 | South Korea (KOR) | 0 | 2 | 5 | 7 |
| 6 | Indonesia (INA) | 0 | 2 | 0 | 2 |
| 7 | Pakistan (PAK) | 0 | 1 | 3 | 4 |
| 8 | Iran (IRI) | 0 | 1 | 1 | 2 |
| 9 | China (CHN) | 0 | 1 | 0 | 1 |
| 10 | Mongolia (MGL) | 0 | 0 | 3 | 3 |
| 11 | Japan (JPN) | 0 | 0 | 1 | 1 |
| 11 | Jordan (JOR) | 0 | 0 | 1 | 1 |
| 11 | North Korea (PRK) | 0 | 0 | 1 | 1 |
| 11 | Philippines (PHI) | 0 | 0 | 1 | 1 |
| 11 | Syria (SYR) | 0 | 0 | 1 | 1 |
| Totals (15 entries) | | 12 | 12 | 24 | 48 |

== Participating nations ==
A total of 159 athletes from 27 nations competed in boxing at the 1998 Asian Games:

- Bangladesh (2)
- Cambodia (4)
- China (7)
- Chinese Taipei (3)
- India (4)
- Indonesia (6)
- Iran (10)
- Japan (8)
- Jordan (3)
- Kazakhstan (10)
- Kuwait (1)
- Kyrgyzstan (9)
- Laos (6)
- Lebanon (2)
- Macau (2)
- Malaysia (3)
- Mongolia (9)
- Nepal (6)
- North Korea (7)
- Pakistan (8)
- Palestine (5)
- Philippines (7)
- South Korea (10)
- Syria (6)
- Thailand (10)
- Turkmenistan (1)
- Uzbekistan (10)
