= Boxing at the 1998 Asian Games – Men's 75 kg =

Boxing competitions

Men's 75 kg at the 1998 Asian Games
- Venue: Land Sports Complex
- Date: 8–17 December 1998
- Competitors: 12 from 12 nations

Medalists
gold medal	Vyacheslav Burba	Kazakhstan
silver medal	Dilshod Yarbekov	Uzbekistan
bronze medal	Mohammad Kaddour	Syria
bronze medal	Kim Ho-chul	South Korea

The men's middleweight boxing competition at the 1998 Asian Games in Bangkok, Thailand was held from 8 to 17 December at the Land Sports Complex.

Like all Asian Games boxing events, the competition was a straight single-elimination tournament. This event consisted of 12 boxers. The competition began with the round of 16 on 8 December, where the number of competitors was reduced to eight, and concluded with the final on 17 December. As there were fewer than 16 boxers in the competition, a number of boxers received a bye through the preliminary round. Both semi-final losers were awarded bronze medals.

All bouts consisted of five three-minute rounds. The boxers receive points for every successful punch they land on their opponent's head or upper body. The boxer with the most points at the end of the bouts wins. If a boxer is knocked to the ground and cannot get up before the referee counts to ten then the bout is over and the opponent wins.

== Schedule ==
All times are Indochina Time (UTC+07:00)

Date	Time	Event
Tuesday, 8 December 1998	14:00	Round of 16
Thursday, 10 December 1998	14:00	Quarterfinals
Monday, 14 December 1998	14:00	Semifinals
Thursday, 17 December 1998	14:00	Final

== Results ==
Legend

- RET — Won by retirement
- RSCI — Won by referee stop contest injury
- RSCO — Won by referee stop contest outclassed

Round of 16
Ebrahim Mousavi (IRI)
Vyacheslav Burba (KAZ)	RET
Jitender Kumar (IND)	RSCI
Ri Kum-chol (PRK)
Nurken Akmataliev (KGZ)
Kim Ho-chul (KOR)	RSCO
Batbuyangiin Enkhtaivan (MGL)	8
Albert Papilaya (INA)	10

Quarterfinals
Dilshod Yarbekov (UZB)	12
Sayidkhan Kulamahmad (THA)	10
Mohammad Kaddour (SYR)	10
Rajan Dangol (NEP)	7
Vyacheslav Burba (KAZ)	8
Jitender Kumar (IND)	7
Kim Ho-chul (KOR)	12
Albert Papilaya (INA)	7

Semifinals
Dilshod Yarbekov (UZB)	RSCO
Mohammad Kaddour (SYR)
Vyacheslav Burba (KAZ)	14
Kim Ho-chul (KOR)	12

Final
Dilshod Yarbekov (UZB)	5
Vyacheslav Burba (KAZ)	6
