= Wrestling at the 1998 Asian Games – Men's freestyle 85 kg =

Men's freestyle 85 kg at the 1998 Asian Games
- Venue: Thammasat Gymnasium 1
- Dates: 17–18 December 1998
- Competitors: 10 from 10 nations

Medalists
gold medal	Alireza Heidari	Iran
silver medal	Rasul Katinovasov	Uzbekistan
bronze medal	Magomed Kurugliyev	Kazakhstan

The men's freestyle 85 kilograms wrestling competition at the 1998 Asian Games in Bangkok was held on 17 December and 18 December at the Thammasat Gymnasium 1.

The gold and silver medalists were determined by the final match of the main single-elimination bracket. The losers advanced to the repechage. These matches determined the bronze medalist for the event.

== Schedule ==
All times are Indochina Time (UTC+07:00)

Date	Time	Event
Thursday, 17 December 1998	09:00	Round 1
Thursday, 17 December 1998	16:00	Round 2
Friday, 18 December 1998	09:00	Round 3
Friday, 18 December 1998	09:00	Round 4
Friday, 18 December 1998	16:00	Finals

== Results ==
=== Round 1 ===
	Score		CP
1/8 finals
Tatsuo Kawai (JPN)	0–8	Yang Hyung-mo (KOR)	0–3 PO
Alireza Heidari (IRI)	7–0 Fall	Chatee Kitpituck (THA)	4–0 TO
Jalal Baker (SYR)	0–11	Ganzorigiin Gankhuyag (MGL)	0–4 ST
Rasul Katinovasov (UZB)	10–0	Baj Yadav (NEP)	4–0 ST
Bolotbek Omurakunov (KGZ)	1–3	Magomed Kurugliyev (KAZ)	1–3 PP

=== Round 2 ===
	Score		CP
Quarterfinals
Yang Hyung-mo (KOR)	1–1	Alireza Heidari (IRI)	1–3 PP
Ganzorigiin Gankhuyag (MGL)		Bye	
Rasul Katinovasov (UZB)		Bye	
Magomed Kurugliyev (KAZ)		Bye	
Repechage
Tatsuo Kawai (JPN)	11–0	Chatee Kitpituck (THA)	4–0 ST
Jalal Baker (SYR)	10–0	Baj Yadav (NEP)	4–0 ST
Bolotbek Omurakunov (KGZ)		Bye	

=== Round 3 ===
	Score		CP
Semifinals
Alireza Heidari (IRI)	13–9	Ganzorigiin Gankhuyag (MGL)	3–1 PP
Rasul Katinovasov (UZB)	3–2	Magomed Kurugliyev (KAZ)	3–1 PP
Repechage
Bolotbek Omurakunov (KGZ)	1–8	Tatsuo Kawai (JPN)	1–3 PP
Jalal Baker (SYR)	0–5	Yang Hyung-mo (KOR)	0–3 PO

=== Round 4 ===
	Score		CP
Repechage
Ganzorigiin Gankhuyag (MGL)	2–3	Tatsuo Kawai (JPN)	1–3 PP
Yang Hyung-mo (KOR)	0–1	Magomed Kurugliyev (KAZ)	0–3 PO

=== Finals ===
	Score		CP
Bronze medal match
Tatsuo Kawai (JPN)	0–3	Magomed Kurugliyev (KAZ)	0–3 PO
Gold medal match
Alireza Heidari (IRI)	5–3	Rasul Katinovasov (UZB)	3–1 PP

== Final standing ==
Rank	Athlete
1st place, gold medalist(s)	Alireza Heidari (IRI)
2nd place, silver medalist(s)	Rasul Katinovasov (UZB)
3rd place, bronze medalist(s)	Magomed Kurugliyev (KAZ)
4	Tatsuo Kawai (JPN)
5	Yang Hyung-mo (KOR)
6	Ganzorigiin Gankhuyag (MGL)
7	Jalal Baker (SYR)
8	Bolotbek Omurakunov (KGZ)
9	Baj Yadav (NEP)
9	Chatee Kitpituck (THA)
