= Athletics at the 1998 Asian Games – Men's decathlon =

Men's decathlon at the 1998 Asian Games
- Venue: Thammasat Stadium
- Dates: 17–18 December 1998
- Competitors: 12 from 9 nations

Medalists
gold medal	Oleg Veretelnikov	Uzbekistan
silver medal	Ramil Ganiyev	Uzbekistan
bronze medal	Toru Yasui	Japan

The men's decathlon competition at the 1998 Asian Games in Bangkok, Thailand was held on 17 and 18 December at the Thammasat Stadium.

== Schedule ==
All times are Indochina Time (UTC+07:00)

Date	Time	Event
Thursday, 17 December 1998	08:30	100 metres
Thursday, 17 December 1998	09:20	Long jump
Thursday, 17 December 1998	10:40	Shot put
Thursday, 17 December 1998	14:30	High jump
Thursday, 17 December 1998	17:20	400 metres
Friday, 18 December 1998	08:30	110 metres hurdles
Friday, 18 December 1998	09:20	Discus throw
Friday, 18 December 1998	11:00	Pole vault
Friday, 18 December 1998	14:30	Javelin throw
Friday, 18 December 1998	16:45	1500 metres

== Results ==
Legend

- DNF — Did not finish
- DNS — Did not start
- NM — No mark

=== 100 metres ===
Rank	Heat	Athlete	Time	Points	Notes
1	1	Oleg Veretelnikov (UZB)	10.77	912	
2	1	Toru Yasui (JPN)	11.04	852	
3	2	Ramil Ganiyev (UZB)	11.10	838	
4	2	Kim Sang-ryong (PRK)	11.15	827	
5	1	David Yimsumruay (THA)	11.22	812	
6	2	Hitoshi Maruono (JPN)	11.37	780	
7	1	Ahmad Hassan Moussa (QAT)	11.42	769	
8	1	Song Shulin (CHN)	11.43	767	
8	2	Viravut Jampatong (THA)	11.43	767	
10	2	Ivan Yarkin (KAZ)	11.55	742	
11	1	Ali Feizi (IRI)	11.63	725	
12	2	Kim Tae-keun (KOR)	11.76	699	

=== Long jump ===
Rank	Athlete	Result	Points	Notes
1	Ramil Ganiyev (UZB)	7.66	975	
2	Oleg Veretelnikov (UZB)	7.58	955	
3	Toru Yasui (JPN)	7.24	871	
4	Viravut Jampatong (THA)	7.08	833	
5	Ivan Yarkin (KAZ)	7.04	823	
6	Kim Sang-ryong (PRK)	7.00	814	
7	Hitoshi Maruono (JPN)	6.99	811	
8	Song Shulin (CHN)	6.95	802	
9	David Yimsumruay (THA)	6.70	743	
10	Ali Feizi (IRI)	6.58	716	
—	Kim Tae-keun (KOR)	NM	0	
—	Ahmad Hassan Moussa (QAT)	NM	0	

=== Shot put ===
Rank	Athlete	Result	Points	Notes
1	Ramil Ganiyev (UZB)	14.37	751	
2	Oleg Veretelnikov (UZB)	14.34	749	
3	Song Shulin (CHN)	14.33	749	
4	Ivan Yarkin (KAZ)	14.23	742	
5	Hitoshi Maruono (JPN)	13.22	681	
6	Kim Sang-ryong (PRK)	12.59	642	
7	Ali Feizi (IRI)	12.25	622	
8	David Yimsumruay (THA)	11.96	604	
9	Viravut Jampatong (THA)	11.87	599	
10	Toru Yasui (JPN)	11.56	580	
—	Kim Tae-keun (KOR)	DNS		
—	Ahmad Hassan Moussa (QAT)	DNS		

=== High jump ===
Rank	Athlete	Result	Points	Notes
1	Song Shulin (CHN)	2.04	840	
2	Ivan Yarkin (KAZ)	2.01	813	
3	Ramil Ganiyev (UZB)	2.01	813	
4	Oleg Veretelnikov (UZB)	1.98	785	
5	Hitoshi Maruono (JPN)	1.98	785	
6	Kim Sang-ryong (PRK)	1.95	758	
7	Viravut Jampatong (THA)	1.95	758	
8	David Yimsumruay (THA)	1.92	731	
9	Ali Feizi (IRI)	1.92	731	
10	Toru Yasui (JPN)	1.86	679	

=== 400 metres ===
Rank	Heat	Athlete	Time	Points	Notes
1	1	Kim Sang-ryong (PRK)	48.20	899	
2	2	Oleg Veretelnikov (UZB)	48.25	897	
3	2	Toru Yasui (JPN)	49.21	851	
4	2	Ramil Ganiyev (UZB)	50.53	790	
5	1	Ali Feizi (IRI)	51.24	758	
6	1	David Yimsumruay (THA)	51.63	741	
7	2	Song Shulin (CHN)	52.17	717	
8	2	Hitoshi Maruono (JPN)	52.59	699	
9	1	Ivan Yarkin (KAZ)	52.68	695	
10	1	Viravut Jampatong (THA)	53.83	647	

=== 110 metres hurdles ===
Rank	Heat	Athlete	Time	Points	Notes
1	2	Ramil Ganiyev (UZB)	14.67	890	
2	2	Toru Yasui (JPN)	14.70	886	
3	2	Oleg Veretelnikov (UZB)	14.97	853	
4	2	Song Shulin (CHN)	15.01	848	
5	1	Ivan Yarkin (KAZ)	15.07	841	
6	1	Hitoshi Maruono (JPN)	15.12	835	
7	1	Kim Sang-ryong (PRK)	15.42	799	
8	1	Ali Feizi (IRI)	15.94	740	
9	2	David Yimsumruay (THA)	16.21	709	
10	1	Viravut Jampatong (THA)	16.97	627	

=== Discus throw ===
Rank	Athlete	Result	Points	Notes
1	Oleg Veretelnikov (UZB)	43.07	727	
2	Ramil Ganiyev (UZB)	42.07	707	
3	Ivan Yarkin (KAZ)	42.02	706	
4	Song Shulin (CHN)	41.76	700	
5	Hitoshi Maruono (JPN)	39.15	647	
6	David Yimsumruay (THA)	38.59	636	
7	Toru Yasui (JPN)	37.39	612	
8	Ali Feizi (IRI)	36.51	594	
9	Kim Sang-ryong (PRK)	36.27	589	
10	Viravut Jampatong (THA)	30.44	473	

=== Pole vault ===
Rank	Athlete	Result	Points	Notes
1	Ramil Ganiyev (UZB)	5.20	972	
2	Toru Yasui (JPN)	5.00	910	
3	Oleg Veretelnikov (UZB)	4.70	819	
3	Song Shulin (CHN)	4.70	819	
3	Hitoshi Maruono (JPN)	4.70	819	
6	Kim Sang-ryong (PRK)	4.50	760	
7	Ivan Yarkin (KAZ)	4.30	702	
8	David Yimsumruay (THA)	4.20	673	
9	Ali Feizi (IRI)	4.10	645	
—	Viravut Jampatong (THA)	NM	0	

=== Javelin throw ===
Rank	Athlete	Result	Points	Notes
1	Hitoshi Maruono (JPN)	64.97	813	
2	Oleg Veretelnikov (UZB)	64.68	808	
3	Toru Yasui (JPN)	59.95	737	
4	Song Shulin (CHN)	58.13	710	
5	Ivan Yarkin (KAZ)	57.11	694	
6	Ali Feizi (IRI)	57.08	694	
7	Viravut Jampatong (THA)	52.49	626	
8	Ramil Ganiyev (UZB)	51.98	618	
9	Kim Sang-ryong (PRK)	49.03	574	
10	David Yimsumruay (THA)	47.85	557	

=== 1500 metres ===
Rank	Athlete	Time	Points	Notes
1	Oleg Veretelnikov (UZB)	4:25.71	773	
2	Ali Feizi (IRI)	4:27.52	761	
3	David Yimsumruay (THA)	4:40.62	676	
4	Ivan Yarkin (KAZ)	4:42.32	666	
5	Toru Yasui (JPN)	4:47.39	634	
6	Song Shulin (CHN)	4:53.50	598	
7	Hitoshi Maruono (JPN)	4:59.49	563	
8	Kim Sang-ryong (PRK)	5:09.86	504	
9	Ramil Ganiyev (UZB)	5:10.17	503	
—	Viravut Jampatong (THA)	DNS		

=== Summary ===
Rank	Athlete	100m	LJ	SP	HJ	400m	110mH	DT	PV	JT	1500m	Total	Notes
1st place, gold medalist(s)	Oleg Veretelnikov (UZB)	912	955	749	785	897	853	727	819	808	773	8278	GR
2nd place, silver medalist(s)	Ramil Ganiyev (UZB)	838	975	751	813	790	890	707	972	618	503	7857	
3rd place, bronze medalist(s)	Toru Yasui (JPN)	852	871	580	679	851	886	612	910	737	634	7612	
4	Song Shulin (CHN)	767	802	749	840	717	848	700	819	710	598	7550	
5	Hitoshi Maruono (JPN)	780	811	681	785	699	835	647	819	813	563	7433	
6	Ivan Yarkin (KAZ)	742	823	742	813	695	841	706	702	694	666	7424	
7	Kim Sang-ryong (PRK)	827	814	642	758	899	799	589	760	574	504	7166	
8	Ali Feizi (IRI)	725	716	622	731	758	740	594	645	694	761	6986	
9	David Yimsumruay (THA)	812	743	604	731	741	709	636	673	557	676	6882	
—	Viravut Jampatong (THA)	767	833	599	758	647	627	473	0	626	DNS	DNF	
—	Kim Tae-keun (KOR)	699	0	DNS								DNF	
—	Ahmad Hassan Moussa (QAT)	769	0	DNS								DNF	
