= Swimming at the 1998 Asian Games – Men's 4 × 200 metre freestyle relay =

Men's 4 × 200 metre freestyle relay at the 1998 Asian Games
- Venue: Thammasat Aquatic Center
- Date: 8 December 1998
- Nations: 11

Medalists
gold medal	Japan; Hideaki Hara, Shunsuke Ito, Shusuke Ito, Yosuke Ichikawa
silver medal	China; Wang Chuan, Du Jie, Xiong Guoming, Deng Qingsong
bronze medal	South Korea; Kim Bang-hyun, Woo Chul, Koh Yun-ho, Han Kyu-chul

The men's 4 × 200 metre freestyle relay swimming competition at the 1998 Asian Games in Bangkok was held on 8 December at the Thammasat Aquatic Center.

== Schedule ==
All times are Indochina Time (UTC+07:00)

Date	Time	Event
Tuesday, 8 December 1998	09:00	Heats
Tuesday, 8 December 1998	18:00	Final

== Results ==
=== Heats ===
Rank	Heat	Team	Time	Notes
1	2	South Korea (KOR)	7:45.17	
2	2	Singapore (SIN)	7:45.80	
3	1	China (CHN)	7:47.24	
4	1	Japan (JPN)	7:47.56	
5	1	Chinese Taipei (TPE)	7:47.81	
6	2	Hong Kong (HKG)	7:48.64	
7	2	Thailand (THA)	7:48.93	
8	2	Uzbekistan (UZB)	7:50.60	
9	2	Kazakhstan (KAZ)	8:01.00	
10	1	Kyrgyzstan (KGZ)	8:22.92	
11	1	Iran (IRI); Hamed Rezakhani; Farshid Karami; Hamid Reza Mobarrez; Pirouz Eftekhar-Manavi	8:29.96	

=== Final ===
Rank	Team	Time	Notes
1st place, gold medalist(s)	Japan (JPN); Hideaki Hara; Shunsuke Ito; Shusuke Ito; Yosuke Ichikawa	7:30.53	
2nd place, silver medalist(s)	China (CHN); Wang Chuan; Du Jie; Xiong Guoming; Deng Qingsong	7:34.11	
3rd place, bronze medalist(s)	South Korea (KOR); Kim Bang-hyun; Woo Chul; Koh Yun-ho; Han Kyu-chul	7:36.07	
4	Hong Kong (HKG)	7:38.91	
5	Singapore (SIN)	7:45.36	
6	Uzbekistan (UZB)	7:45.49	
7	Chinese Taipei (TPE)	7:46.85	
8	Thailand (THA)	7:53.60	
