= Judo at the 1998 Asian Games – Men's 66 kg =

Judo competition

Men's 66 kg at the 1998 Asian Games
- Venue: Thammasat Gymnasium 1
- Date: 7 December 1998
- Competitors: 16 from 16 nations

Medalists
gold medal	Yukimasa Nakamura	Japan
silver medal	Ivan Baglayev	Kazakhstan
bronze medal	Erdenebaataryn Uuganbayar	Mongolia
bronze medal	Arash Miresmaeili	Iran

The men's 66 kilograms (Half lightweight) competition at the 1998 Asian Games in Bangkok was held on 7 December 1998 at the Thammasat Gymnasium 1.

== Schedule ==
All times are Indochina Time (UTC+07:00)

Date	Time	Event
Monday, 7 December 1998	14:00	Round 1
Monday, 7 December 1998	14:00	Quarterfinals
Monday, 7 December 1998	14:00	Repechage
Monday, 7 December 1998	14:00	Semifinals
Monday, 7 December 1998	14:00	Finals

== Results ==
Legend

- DEC — Won by decision
- DQ — Won by disqualification
- IPP — Won by ippon
- KOK — Won by koka
- WAZ — Won by waza-ari
- WO — Won by walkover
- YUK — Won by yuko

=== Main bracket ===
Round 1
Yukimasa Nakamura (JPN)	IPP
Rami Dasouqi (JOR)
Erdenebaataryn Uuganbayar (MGL)	IPP
Mansur Jumaev (UZB)
Raed Mohra (PLE)
Hwang In-soo (KOR)	IPP
Kim Myong-gil (PRK)	DEC
Taalai Israilov (KGZ)
Arash Miresmaeili (IRI)
Ivan Baglayev (KAZ)	KOK
Naser Abdullah (KUW)	IPP
Bodin Panjabutra (THA)
Aristotle Lucero (PHI)
Guwanç Nurmuhammedow (TKM)	YUK
Sherali Bozorov (TJK)
Chong Ka Weng (MAC)	WO

Quarterfinals
Yukimasa Nakamura (JPN)	YUK
Erdenebaataryn Uuganbayar (MGL)
Hwang In-soo (KOR)	IPP
Kim Myong-gil (PRK)
Ivan Baglayev (KAZ)	IPP
Naser Abdullah (KUW)
Guwanç Nurmuhammedow (TKM)	IPP
Chong Ka Weng (MAC)

Semifinals
Yukimasa Nakamura (JPN)	WAZ
Hwang In-soo (KOR)
Ivan Baglayev (KAZ)	DQ
Guwanç Nurmuhammedow (TKM)

Final
Yukimasa Nakamura (JPN)	IPP
Ivan Baglayev (KAZ)

=== Repechage ===
Repechage 1
Rami Dasouqi (JOR)
Erdenebaataryn Uuganbayar (MGL)	IPP
Raed Mohra (PLE)
Kim Myong-gil (PRK)	IPP
Arash Miresmaeili (IRI)	WAZ
Naser Abdullah (KUW)
Aristotle Lucero (PHI)	IPP
Chong Ka Weng (MAC)

Repechage 2
Erdenebaataryn Uuganbayar (MGL)	IPP
Kim Myong-gil (PRK)
Arash Miresmaeili (IRI)	WAZ
Aristotle Lucero (PHI)

Bronze medals
Erdenebaataryn Uuganbayar (MGL)	WO
Guwanç Nurmuhammedow (TKM)
Arash Miresmaeili (IRI)	KOK
Hwang In-soo (KOR)
