= Wrestling at the 1998 Asian Games – Men's Greco-Roman 69 kg =

Men's Greco-Roman 69 kg at the 1998 Asian Games
- Venue: Thammasat Gymnasium 1
- Dates: 13–14 December 1998
- Competitors: 10 from 10 nations

Medalists
gold medal	Son Sang-pil	South Korea
silver medal	Mkhitar Manukyan	Kazakhstan
bronze medal	Grigori Pulyaev	Uzbekistan

The men's Greco-Roman 69 kilograms wrestling competition at the 1998 Asian Games in Bangkok was held on 13 December and 14 December at the Thammasat Gymnasium 1.

The gold and silver medalists were determined by the final match of the main single-elimination bracket. The losers advanced to the repechage. These matches determined the bronze medalist for the event.

== Schedule ==
All times are Indochina Time (UTC+07:00)

Date	Time	Event
Sunday, 13 December 1998	09:00	Round 1
Sunday, 13 December 1998	16:00	Round 2
Monday, 14 December 1998	09:00	Round 3
Monday, 14 December 1998	09:00	Round 4
Monday, 14 December 1998	16:00	Finals

== Results ==
Legend

- WO — Won by walkover

=== Round 1 ===
	Score		CP
1/8 finals
Auaz Ordobaev (KGZ)	2–8	Son Sang-pil (KOR)	1–3 PP
Katsuhiko Nagata (JPN)	10–0	Apisit Buain (THA)	4–0 ST
Jong Kon-i (PRK)	0–10	Grigori Pulyaev (UZB)	0–4 ST
Mkhitar Manukyan (KAZ)	10–0	Wu Cheng-hsun (TPE)	4–0 ST
Gholam Hossein Pezeshki (IRI)	5–0	Yaser Al-Saleh (SYR)	3–0 PO

=== Round 2 ===
	Score		CP
Quarterfinals
Son Sang-pil (KOR)	3–1	Katsuhiko Nagata (JPN)	3–1 PP
Grigori Pulyaev (UZB)		Bye	
Mkhitar Manukyan (KAZ)		Bye	
Gholam Hossein Pezeshki (IRI)		Bye	
Repechage
Auaz Ordobaev (KGZ)	14–0	Apisit Buain (THA)	4–0 ST
Jong Kon-i (PRK)	12–5	Wu Cheng-hsun (TPE)	3–1 PP
Yaser Al-Saleh (SYR)		Bye	

=== Round 3 ===
	Score		CP
Semifinals
Son Sang-pil (KOR)	6–0	Grigori Pulyaev (UZB)	3–0 PO
Mkhitar Manukyan (KAZ)	10–0	Gholam Hossein Pezeshki (IRI)	4–0 ST
Repechage
Yaser Al-Saleh (SYR)	0–10	Auaz Ordobaev (KGZ)	0–4 ST
Jong Kon-i (PRK)	5–4	Katsuhiko Nagata (JPN)	3–1 PP

=== Round 4 ===
	Score		CP
Repechage
Grigori Pulyaev (UZB)	14–1	Auaz Ordobaev (KGZ)	4–1 SP
Jong Kon-i (PRK)	3–2	Gholam Hossein Pezeshki (IRI)	3–1 PP

=== Finals ===
	Score		CP
Bronze medal match
Grigori Pulyaev (UZB)	WO	Jong Kon-i (PRK)	4–0 PA
Gold medal match
Son Sang-pil (KOR)	1–0	Mkhitar Manukyan (KAZ)	3–0 PO

== Final standing ==
Rank	Athlete
1st place, gold medalist(s)	Son Sang-pil (KOR)
2nd place, silver medalist(s)	Mkhitar Manukyan (KAZ)
3rd place, bronze medalist(s)	Grigori Pulyaev (UZB)
4	Jong Kon-i (PRK)
5	Auaz Ordobaev (KGZ)
6	Gholam Hossein Pezeshki (IRI)
7	Katsuhiko Nagata (JPN)
8	Yaser Al-Saleh (SYR)
9	Wu Cheng-hsun (TPE)
10	Apisit Buain (THA)
