= Weightlifting at the 1998 Asian Games – Men's 77 kg =

Men's 77 kg at the 1998 Asian Games
- Venue: Thunder Dome
- Date: 10 December 1998
- Competitors: 19 from 15 nations

Medalists
gold medal	Zhan Xugang	China
silver medal	Mohammad Hossein Barkhah	Iran
bronze medal	Sergey Filimonov	Kazakhstan

The men's 77 kilograms event at the 1998 Asian Games took place on 10 December 1998 at Thunder Dome, Maung Thong Thani Sports Complex.

The weightlifter from China won the gold, with a combined lift of 355 kg.

Total score was the sum of the lifter's best result in each of the snatch and the clean and jerk, with three lifts allowed for each lift. In case of a tie, the lighter lifter won; if still tied, the lifter who took the fewest attempts to achieve the total score won. Lifters without a valid snatch score were allowed to perform the clean and jerk.

== Results ==
Legend

- NM — No mark

Rank	Athlete	Body weight	Snatch (kg)				Clean & Jerk (kg)				Total
Rank	Athlete	Body weight	1	2	3	Result	1	2	3	Result	Total
1st place, gold medalist(s)	Zhan Xugang (CHN)	76.40	152.5	157.5	160.0	160.0	195.0	~~205.5~~	~~205.5~~	195.0	355.0
2nd place, silver medalist(s)	Mohammad Hossein Barkhah (IRI)	76.85	150.0	155.0	~~157.5~~	155.0	192.5	197.5	~~205.0~~	197.5	352.5
3rd place, bronze medalist(s)	Sergey Filimonov (KAZ)	76.65	155.0	160.0	~~165.0~~	160.0	190.0	~~195.0~~	~~195.0~~	190.0	350.0
4	Kim Jong-shik (KOR)	75.80	~~145.0~~	145.0	150.0	150.0	175.0	187.5	~~200.0~~	187.5	337.5
5	Mital Sharipov (KGZ)	76.65	145.0	150.0	155.0	155.0	177.5	~~182.5~~	~~185.0~~	177.5	332.5
6	Lee Kang-suk (KOR)	76.50	~~150.0~~	150.0	~~155.0~~	150.0	180.0	~~195.0~~	~~200.0~~	180.0	330.0
7	Gennadiy Yermakov (KAZ)	76.85	~~147.5~~	147.5	150.0	150.0	175.0	180.0	~~185.0~~	180.0	330.0
8	Shuhrat Kochkorov (KGZ)	76.50	135.0	140.0	~~145.0~~	140.0	175.0	182.5	187.5	187.5	327.5
9	Mehran Azari (IRI)	76.60	~~147.5~~	~~147.5~~	147.5	147.5	180.0	~~185.0~~	~~185.0~~	180.0	327.5
10	Satheesha Rai (IND)	76.70	~~140.0~~	140.0	~~145.0~~	140.0	~~177.5~~	~~177.5~~	177.5	177.5	317.5
11	Mahmood Ahmed Ali (QAT)	75.90	130.0	135.0	~~137.5~~	135.0	162.5	170.0	172.5	172.5	307.5
12	Chamnan Srinoul (THA)	76.10	130.0	135.0	~~137.5~~	135.0	~~165.0~~	165.0	172.5	172.5	307.5
13	Abdulla Ibadullaev (UZB)	76.20	135.0	140.0	~~145.0~~	140.0	~~165.0~~	165.0	~~170.0~~	165.0	305.0
14	Khodor Alaywan (LIB)	76.80	~~132.5~~	132.5	~~137.5~~	132.5	~~160.0~~	~~160.0~~	160.0	160.0	292.5
15	Aldanete Alfonsito (PHI)	75.45	125.0	~~130.0~~	~~130.0~~	125.0	160.0	~~165.0~~	~~165.0~~	160.0	285.0
16	Punti Lal Yadav (NEP)	75.20	100.0	105.0	~~107.5~~	105.0	125.0	~~130.0~~	~~130.0~~	125.0	230.0
—	Abdallah Al-Sebaei (SYR)	76.75	147.5	~~152.5~~	~~155.0~~	147.5	~~177.5~~	~~177.5~~	~~177.5~~	—	NM
—	Tsai Hung-chang (TPE)	76.15	~~132.5~~	~~137.5~~	~~137.5~~	—	—	—	—	—	NM
—	Nguyễn Quốc Thành (VIE)	76.95	~~130.0~~	~~135.0~~	~~135.0~~	—	—	—	—	—	NM
