= Weightlifting at the 1998 Asian Games – Men's 94 kg =

Weightlifting Event, 12 December 1998

Men's 94 kg at the 1998 Asian Games
- Venue: Thunder Dome
- Date: 12 December 1998
- Competitors: 15 from 12 nations

Medalists
gold medal	Andrey Makarov	Kazakhstan
silver medal	Kourosh Bagheri	Iran
bronze medal	Chun Yong-sung	South Korea

The men's 94 kilograms event at the 1998 Asian Games took place on 12 December 1998 at Thunder Dome, Maung Thong Thani Sports Complex.

A total of fifteen weightlifters from twelve national Olympic committees participated in this event. Andrey Makarov from Kazakhstan won the gold, with a combined lift of 385 kilograms, Kourosh Bagheri from Iran and South Korean Chun Yong-sung completed the podium.

Total score was the sum of the lifter's best result in each of the snatch and the clean and jerk, with three lifts allowed for each lift. In case of a tie, the lighter lifter won; if still tied, the lifter who took the fewest attempts to achieve the total score won. Lifters without a valid snatch score were allowed to perform the clean and jerk.

== Results ==
Rank	Athlete	Body weight	Snatch (kg)				Clean & Jerk (kg)				Total
Rank	Athlete	Body weight	1	2	3	Result	1	2	3	Result	Total
1st place, gold medalist(s)	Andrey Makarov (KAZ)	92.20	167.5	175.0	180.0	180.0	195.0	~~205.0~~	205.0	205.0	385.0
2nd place, silver medalist(s)	Kourosh Bagheri (IRI)	93.55	170.0	~~175.0~~	175.0	175.0	202.5	~~210.0~~	~~212.5~~	202.5	377.5
3rd place, bronze medalist(s)	Chun Yong-sung (KOR)	93.90	162.5	~~167.5~~	~~167.5~~	162.5	205.0	210.0	~~217.5~~	210.0	372.5
4	Qin Guang (CHN)	91.65	162.5	~~167.5~~	~~167.5~~	162.5	~~202.5~~	202.5	207.5	207.5	370.0
5	Fazilbek Urazimbetov (UZB)	92.25	160.0	~~165.0~~	~~165.0~~	160.0	202.5	~~207.5~~	~~212.5~~	202.5	362.5
6	Slavik Nyu (KAZ)	91.95	160.0	167.5	~~172.5~~	167.5	~~190.0~~	190.0	~~210.0~~	190.0	357.5
7	Ulugbek Mahmudov (UZB)	93.90	155.0	162.5	~~165.0~~	162.5	195.0	~~205.0~~	~~212.5~~	195.0	357.5
8	Almaz Askeev (KGZ)	93.05	157.5	~~162.5~~	~~162.5~~	157.5	190.0	~~195.0~~	~~195.0~~	190.0	347.5
9	Chiang Ming-cheng (TPE)	93.45	150.0	~~155.0~~	~~155.0~~	150.0	~~190.0~~	190.0	~~200.0~~	190.0	340.0
10	Mamoru Sano (JPN)	93.85	140.0	150.0	152.5	152.5	180.0	~~190.0~~	~~190.0~~	180.0	332.5
11	Narongsak Panyaake (THA)	90.25	125.0	132.5	137.5	137.5	165.0	177.5	~~185.0~~	177.5	315.0
12	Abdulkhalid Ahmed Ali (QAT)	93.05	135.0	140.0	~~145.0~~	140.0	170.0	175.0	~~180.0~~	175.0	315.0
13	Wen Chen-yen (TPE)	93.65	145.0	~~150.0~~	~~150.0~~	145.0	~~170.0~~	170.0	~~180.0~~	170.0	315.0
14	Kim Te-yang (PRK)	92.90	120.0	125.0	~~130.0~~	125.0	~~155.0~~	~~160.0~~	160.0	160.0	285.0
15	Bidyut Kumar Roy (BAN)	92.90	120.0	125.0	127.5	127.5	150.0	~~160.0~~	~~160.0~~	150.0	277.5
