= Boxing at the 1998 Asian Games – Men's 57 kg =

Boxing competitions

Men's 57 kg at the 1998 Asian Games
- Venue: Land Sports Complex
- Date: 8–18 December 1998
- Competitors: 14 from 14 nations

Medalists
gold medal	Somluck Kamsing	Thailand
silver medal	Tulkunbay Turgunov	Uzbekistan
bronze medal	Eric Canoy	Philippines
bronze medal	Norihisa Tomimoto	Japan

The men's featherweight boxing competition at the 1998 Asian Games in Bangkok, Thailand was held from 8 to 18 December at the Land Sports Complex.

Like all Asian Games boxing events, the competition was a straight single-elimination tournament. This event consisted of 14 boxers. The competition began with the round of 16 on 8 December, where the number of competitors was reduced to 8, and concluded with the final on 18 December. As there were fewer than 16 boxers in the competition, a number of boxers received a bye through the preliminary round. Both semi-final losers were awarded bronze medals.

All bouts consisted of five three-minute rounds. The boxers receive points for every successful punch they land on their opponent's head or upper body. The boxer with the most points at the end of the bouts wins. If a boxer is knocked to the ground and cannot get up before the referee counts to 10 then the bout is over and the opponent wins.

== Schedule ==
All times are Indochina Time (UTC+07:00)

Date	Time	Event
Tuesday, 8 December 1998	14:00	Round of 16
Sunday, 13 December 1998	14:00	Quarterfinals
Tuesday, 15 December 1998	14:00	Semifinals
Friday, 18 December 1998	14:00	Final

== Results ==
Legend

- KO — Won by knockout
- RSCI — Won by referee stop contest injury

Round of 16
Bijan Batmani (IRI)	9
Yousef Hamidi (SYR)	4
Eric Canoy (PHI)	9
Pak Chol-jun (PRK)	5
Somluck Kamsing (THA)	17
Lim Jae-hwan (KOR)	6
Jamgany Narantsogt (MGL)	RSCI
Faisal Karim (PAK)
Vilasack Khouandy (LAO)	18
Muzaffar Yusupbekov (KGZ)	9
Norihisa Tomimoto (JPN)	KO
Hem Sokhet (CAM)

Quarterfinals
Tulkunbay Turgunov (UZB)	8
Işanguly Meretnyýazow (TKM)	5
Bijan Batmani (IRI)	4
Eric Canoy (PHI)	5
Somluck Kamsing (THA)	20
Jamgany Narantsogt (MGL)	3
Vilasack Khouandy (LAO)	3
Norihisa Tomimoto (JPN)	14

Semifinals
Tulkunbay Turgunov (UZB)	15
Eric Canoy (PHI)	7
Somluck Kamsing (THA)	16
Norihisa Tomimoto (JPN)	2

Final
Tulkunbay Turgunov (UZB)	3
Somluck Kamsing (THA)	8
