= Weightlifting at the 1998 Asian Games – Men's 85 kg =

Men's 85 kg at the 1998 Asian Games
- Venue: Thunder Dome
- Date: 11 December 1998
- Competitors: 12 from 11 nations

Medalists
gold medal	Shahin Nassirinia	Iran
silver medal	Yuan Aijun	China
bronze medal	Bakhtiyor Nurullaev	Uzbekistan

The men's 85 kilograms event at the 1998 Asian Games took place on 11 December 1998 at Thunder Dome, Maung Thong Thani Sports Complex.

The weightlifter from Iran won the gold, with a combined lift of 380 kg.

Total score was the sum of the lifter's best result in each of the snatch and the clean and jerk, with three lifts allowed for each lift. In case of a tie, the lighter lifter won; if still tied, the lifter who took the fewest attempts to achieve the total score won. Lifters without a valid snatch score were allowed to perform the clean and jerk.

== Results ==
Legend

- NM — No mark

Rank	Athlete	Body weight	Snatch (kg)				Clean & Jerk (kg)				Total
Rank	Athlete	Body weight	1	2	3	Result	1	2	3	Result	Total
1st place, gold medalist(s)	Shahin Nassirinia (IRI)	84.35	170.0	~~178.5~~	~~178.5~~	170.0	205.0	~~205.0~~	210.0	210.0	380.0
2nd place, silver medalist(s)	Yuan Aijun (CHN)	84.50	160.0	~~165.0~~	165.0	165.0	192.5	200.0	205.0	205.0	370.0
3rd place, bronze medalist(s)	Bakhtiyor Nurullaev (UZB)	81.95	150.0	157.5	162.5	162.5	185.0	~~190.0~~	~~190.0~~	185.0	347.5
4	Ri Kyong-nam (PRK)	78.80	~~150.0~~	150.0	155.0	155.0	177.5	185.0	~~190.0~~	185.0	340.0
5	Khajik Khajoyan (SYR)	85.00	150.0	~~155.0~~	~~155.0~~	150.0	180.0	185.0	~~192.5~~	185.0	335.0
6	Kazumi Suzuki (JPN)	83.15	137.5	142.5	~~145.0~~	142.5	182.5	187.5	~~192.5~~	187.5	330.0
7	Chiu Yen-chun (TPE)	84.75	140.0	145.0	~~150.0~~	145.0	180.0	185.0	~~190.0~~	185.0	330.0
8	Anuchit Saengsiriat (THA)	84.30	135.0	~~140.0~~	~~140.0~~	135.0	175.0	182.5	185.0	185.0	320.0
9	Masoud Ahmed Ali (QAT)	81.75	~~120.0~~	~~120.0~~	120.0	120.0	160.0	~~170.0~~	175.0	175.0	295.0
—	Jeevan Gautam (NEP)	82.60	~~105.0~~	~~105.0~~	105.0	105.0	~~130.0~~	~~130.0~~	~~130.0~~	—	NM
—	Zhang Yong (CHN)	82.40	~~150.0~~	~~150.0~~	~~150.0~~	—	~~192.5~~	192.5	200.0	200.0	NM
—	Jin Myung-sung (KOR)	84.30	~~155.0~~	~~155.0~~	~~155.0~~	—	185.0	~~200.0~~	~~200.0~~	185.0	NM
