= Weightlifting at the 1998 Asian Games – Men's 56 kg =

Men's 56 kg at the 1998 Asian Games
- Venue: Thunder Dome
- Date: 7 December 1998
- Competitors: 15 from 14 nations

Medalists
gold medal	Lan Shizhang	China
silver medal	Wang Shin-yuan	Chinese Taipei
bronze medal	Mehdi Panzvan	Iran

The men's 56 kilograms event at the 1998 Asian Games took place on 7 December 1998 at Thunder Dome, Maung Thong Thani Sports Complex.

The weightlifter from China won the gold, with a combined lift of 275 kg.

Total score was the sum of the lifter's best result in each of the snatch and the clean and jerk, with three lifts allowed for each lift. In case of a tie, the lighter lifter won; if still tied, the lifter who took the fewest attempts to achieve the total score won. Lifters without a valid snatch score were allowed to perform the clean and jerk.

== Results ==
Legend

- NM — No mark

Rank	Athlete	Body weight	Snatch (kg)				Clean & Jerk (kg)				Total
Rank	Athlete	Body weight	1	2	3	Result	1	2	3	Result	Total
1st place, gold medalist(s)	Lan Shizhang (CHN)	55.75	120.0	~~125.0~~	~~125.0~~	120.0	155.0	~~166.0~~	~~166.0~~	155.0	275.0
2nd place, silver medalist(s)	Wang Shin-yuan (TPE)	55.05	~~115.0~~	115.0	~~120.0~~	115.0	~~150.0~~	152.5	~~155.0~~	152.5	267.5
3rd place, bronze medalist(s)	Mehdi Panzvan (IRI)	55.75	115.0	120.0	122.5	122.5	140.0	145.0	~~147.5~~	145.0	267.5
4	Kim Chol-min (PRK)	55.70	115.0	~~120.0~~	120.0	120.0	145.0	~~152.5~~	~~152.5~~	145.0	265.0
5	Yang Chin-yi (TPE)	55.15	~~110.0~~	110.0	~~115.0~~	110.0	140.0	~~145.0~~	~~145.0~~	140.0	250.0
6	Toshiyuki Notomi (JPN)	55.35	~~107.5~~	107.5	~~110.0~~	107.5	135.0	137.5	~~142.5~~	137.5	245.0
7	Karitha Pandian Arumugam (IND)	55.90	102.5	107.5	~~110.0~~	107.5	132.5	137.5	~~142.5~~	137.5	245.0
8	Antonio Agustin (PHI)	55.60	102.5	~~107.5~~	~~107.5~~	102.5	~~135.0~~	~~135.0~~	135.0	135.0	237.5
9	Viktor Yansky (UZB)	55.75	~~105.0~~	~~105.0~~	105.0	105.0	132.5	~~137.5~~	~~137.5~~	132.5	237.5
10	Matin Guntali (MAS)	55.75	102.5	~~107.5~~	~~107.5~~	102.5	132.5	~~137.5~~	~~140.0~~	132.5	235.0
11	Ümürbek Bazarbaýew (TKM)	55.70	100.0	105.0	~~110.0~~	105.0	122.5	~~127.5~~	127.5	127.5	232.5
12	Rakesh Ranjeet (NEP)	55.35	90.0	~~95.0~~	~~95.0~~	90.0	~~120.0~~	122.5	~~127.5~~	122.5	212.5
—	Muhammad Ishtiaq Ghafoor (PAK)	53.50	~~90.0~~	95.0	~~100.0~~	95.0	~~120.0~~	~~120.0~~	~~120.0~~	—	NM
—	Apisit Rittideach (THA)	55.20	~~110.0~~	~~110.0~~	—	—	—	—	—	—	NM
DQ	Ayed Khawaldeh (JOR)	55.85	~~105.0~~	~~105.0~~	107.5	107.5	~~135.0~~	~~135.0~~	~~135.0~~	—	~~NM~~

- Ayed Khawaldeh of Jordan originally finished with no mark, but was disqualified after he tested positive for triamterene.
