= Wrestling at the 1998 Asian Games – Men's Greco-Roman 97 kg =

Men's Greco-Roman 97 kg at the 1998 Asian Games
- Venue: Thammasat Gymnasium 1
- Dates: 12–13 December 1998
- Competitors: 9 from 9 nations

Medalists
gold medal	Sergey Matviyenko	Kazakhstan
silver medal	Mohammad Al-Haiek	Syria
bronze medal	Park Woo	South Korea

The men's Greco-Roman 97 kilograms wrestling competition at the 1998 Asian Games in Bangkok was held on 12 December and 13 December at the Thammasat Gymnasium 1.

The gold and silver medalists were determined by the final match of the main single-elimination bracket. The losers advanced to the repechage. These matches determined the bronze medalist for the event.

== Schedule ==
All times are Indochina Time (UTC+07:00)

Date	Time	Event
Saturday, 12 December 1998	09:00	Round 1
Saturday, 12 December 1998	16:00	Round 2
Saturday, 12 December 1998	16:00	Round 3
Sunday, 13 December 1998	09:00	Round 4
Sunday, 13 December 1998	16:00	Finals

== Results ==
=== Round 1 ===
	Score		CP
1/8 finals
Nasser Bechara (LIB)	0–10	Mohammad Al-Haiek (SYR)	0–4 ST
Zhang Yuankai (CHN)	0–4	Park Woo (KOR)	0–3 PO
Sergey Matviyenko (KAZ)	3–0	Mohammad Sharabiani (IRI)	3–0 PO
Isomjon Kenjaev (UZB)	12–0	Toshinori Iwabuchi (JPN)	4–0 ST
Nopporn Yoosumraan (THA)		Bye	

=== Round 2 ===
	Score		CP
Quarterfinals
Nopporn Yoosumraan (THA)	0–6 Fall	Mohammad Al-Haiek (SYR)	0–4 TO
Park Woo (KOR)		Bye	
Sergey Matviyenko (KAZ)		Bye	
Isomjon Kenjaev (UZB)		Bye	
Repechage
Nasser Bechara (LIB)	0–11	Zhang Yuankai (CHN)	0–4 ST
Mohammad Sharabiani (IRI)	7–0	Toshinori Iwabuchi (JPN)	3–0 PO

=== Round 3 ===
	Score		CP
Semifinals
Mohammad Al-Haiek (SYR)	3–0	Park Woo (KOR)	3–0 PO
Sergey Matviyenko (KAZ)	4–0 Fall	Isomjon Kenjaev (UZB)	4–0 TO
Repechage
Zhang Yuankai (CHN)	4–0 Fall	Nopporn Yoosumraan (THA)	4–0 TO
Mohammad Sharabiani (IRI)		Bye	

=== Round 4 ===
	Score		CP
Repechage
Park Woo (KOR)	4–0	Mohammad Sharabiani (IRI)	3–0 PO
Zhang Yuankai (CHN)	2–1	Isomjon Kenjaev (UZB)	3–1 PP

=== Finals ===
	Score		CP
Bronze medal match
Park Woo (KOR)	0–0	Zhang Yuankai (CHN)	0–3 PO
Gold medal match
Mohammad Al-Haiek (SYR)	0–3	Sergey Matviyenko (KAZ)	0–3 PO

== Final standing ==
Rank	Athlete
1st place, gold medalist(s)	Sergey Matviyenko (KAZ)
2nd place, silver medalist(s)	Mohammad Al-Haiek (SYR)
3rd place, bronze medalist(s)	Park Woo (KOR)
4	Zhang Yuankai (CHN)
5	Isomjon Kenjaev (UZB)
6	Mohammad Sharabiani (IRI)
7	Nopporn Yoosumraan (THA)
8	Toshinori Iwabuchi (JPN)
8	Nasser Bechara (LIB)
