= Swimming at the 1998 Asian Games – Men's 400 metre freestyle =

Men's 400 metre freestyle at the 1998 Asian Games
- Venue: Thammasat Aquatic Center
- Date: 10 December 1998
- Competitors: 17 from 11 nations

Medalists
gold medal	Torlarp Sethsothorn	Thailand
silver medal	Masato Hirano	Japan
bronze medal	Mark Kwok	Hong Kong

The men's 400 metre freestyle swimming competition at the 1998 Asian Games in Bangkok was held on 10 December at the Thammasat Aquatic Center.

== Schedule ==
All times are Indochina Time (UTC+07:00)

Date	Time	Event
Thursday, 10 December 1998	09:00	Heats
Thursday, 10 December 1998	18:00	Final

== Results ==
=== Heats ===
Rank	Heat	Athlete	Time	Notes
1	3	Masato Hirano (JPN)	4:00.45	
2	1	Torwai Sethsothorn (THA)	4:01.99	
3	3	Torlarp Sethsothorn (THA)	4:02.08	
4	3	Mark Kwok (HKG)	4:02.56	
5	1	Woo Chul (KOR)	4:04:09	
6	3	Hisham Al-Masri (SYR)	4:05.51	
7	2	Yosuke Ichikawa (JPN)	4:06.49	
8	2	Deng Qingsong (CHN)	4:06.58	
9	2	Li Yun-lun (TPE)	4:06.75	
10	2	Alex Fong (HKG)	4:08.80	
11	1	Sng Ju Wei (SIN)	4:09.06	
12	3	Mark Chay (SIN)	4:09.08	
13	2	Lee Gyu-chang (KOR)	4:09.24	
14	3	Carlo Piccio (PHI)	4:10.01	
15	1	Raymond Papa (PHI)	4:13.99	
16	2	Hamed Rezakhani (IRI)	4:24.32	
17	1	Hem Kiry (CAM)	4:45.78	

=== Final ===
Rank	Athlete	Time	Notes
1st place, gold medalist(s)	Torlarp Sethsothorn (THA)	3:53.61	GR
2nd place, silver medalist(s)	Masato Hirano (JPN)	3:54.13	
3rd place, bronze medalist(s)	Mark Kwok (HKG)	4:00.44	
4	Woo Chul (KOR)	4:00.66	
5	Yosuke Ichikawa (JPN)	4:00.75	
6	Torwai Sethsothorn (THA)	4:03.62	
7	Hisham Al-Masri (SYR)	4:05.92	
8	Deng Qingsong (CHN)	4:13.19	
