= Wushu at the 1998 Asian Games – Men's sanshou 56 kg =

Men's sanshou 56 kg at the 1998 Asian Games
- Venue: Thammasat Gymnasium 6
- Dates: 16–19 December 1998
- Competitors: 10 from 10 nations

Medalists
gold medal	Zheng Kunyou	China
silver medal	Pichit Jaisak	Thailand
bronze medal	Roger Chulhang	Philippines
bronze medal	Yeh Chun-chang	Chinese Taipei

The men's sanshou 56 kilograms at the 1998 Asian Games in Bangkok, Thailand was held from 16 to 19 December at the Thammasat Gymnasium 6.

Sanda, formerly knows as Sanshou is the official Chinese full contact combat sport. Sanda (Sanshou) is a fighting system which was originally developed by the Chinese military based upon the study and practices of traditional Kung fu and modern combat fighting techniques.

A total of 10 men from 10 different countries competed in this event, limited to fighters whose body weight was less than 56 kilograms.

Zheng Kunyou from China won the gold medal after beating Pichit Jaisaka of the host nation Thailand in gold medal bout 2–0, The bronze medal was shared by Roger Chulhang from the Philippines and Yeh Chun-chang of Chinese Taipei.

== Schedule ==
All times are Indochina Time (UTC+07:00)

Date	Time	Event
Wednesday, 16 December 1998	14:00	Round of 16
Thursday, 17 December 1998	14:00	Quarterfinals
Friday, 18 December 1998	14:00	Semifinals
Saturday, 19 December 1998	14:00	Final

== Results ==
Round of 16
Alireza Rouzbahani (IRI)	0
Zheng Kunyou (CHN)	2
Pichit Jaisak (THA)	2
Zagaryn Batkhuyag (MGL)	0

Quarterfinals
Chum Piseth (CAM)	0
Zheng Kunyou (CHN)	2
Roger Chulhang (PHI)	2
Chhemang Dorj Lama (NEP)	0
Đào Việt Lập (VIE)	1
Yeh Chun-chang (TPE)	2
Pichit Jaisak (THA)	2
Vanxay Baophom (LAO)	0

Semifinals
Zheng Kunyou (CHN)	2
Roger Chulhang (PHI)	0
Yeh Chun-chang (TPE)	0
Pichit Jaisak (THA)	2

Final
Zheng Kunyou (CHN)	2
Pichit Jaisak (THA)	0
