= Wushu at the 1998 Asian Games – Men's sanshou 60 kg =

Men's sanshou 60 kg at the 1998 Asian Games
- Venue: Thammasat Gymnasium 6
- Dates: 16–19 December 1998
- Competitors: 8 from 8 nations

Medalists
gold medal	Sun Xunchang	China
silver medal	Komsan Thongtup	Thailand
bronze medal	Nurlan Zhunuspekov	Kazakhstan
bronze medal	Wang Yeh-hao	Chinese Taipei

The men's sanshou 60 kilograms at the 1998 Asian Games in Bangkok, Thailand was held from 16 to 19 December at the Thammasat Gymnasium 6.

== Schedule ==
All times are Indochina Time (UTC+07:00)

Date	Time	Event
Wednesday, 16 December 1998	14:00	Quarterfinals
Thursday, 17 December 1998	14:00	Quarterfinals
Friday, 18 December 1998	14:00	Semifinals
Saturday, 19 December 1998	14:00	Final

== Results ==
Quarterfinals		Semifinals		Final
Sun Xunchang (CHN)	2
Diệp Bảo Minh (VIE)	0	Sun Xunchang (CHN)	2
Nurlan Zhunuspekov (KAZ)	2	Nurlan Zhunuspekov (KAZ)	0
Ali Khodaei (IRI)	1			Sun Xunchang (CHN)	2
Wang Yeh-hao (TPE)	2			Komsan Thongtup (THA)	0
Narayan Shrestha (NEP)	0	Wang Yeh-hao (TPE)	0
Vanxay Oudomphon (LAO)	0	Komsan Thongtup (THA)	2
Komsan Thongtup (THA)	2
