= Wushu at the 1998 Asian Games – Men's sanshou 52 kg =

Men's sanshou 52 kg at the 1998 Asian Games
- Venue: Thammasat Gymnasium 6
- Dates: 16–19 December 1998
- Competitors: 10 from 10 nations

Medalists
gold medal	Xing Zhijie	China
silver medal	Rolly Chulhang	Philippines
bronze medal	Teerawat Donniart	Thailand
bronze medal	Phoukhong Khamsounthone	Laos

The men's sanshou 52 kilograms at the 1998 Asian Games in Bangkok, Thailand was held from 16 to 19 December at the Thammasat Gymnasium 6.

Sanda, formerly knows as Sanshou is the official Chinese full contact combat sport. Sanda (Sanshou) is a fighting system which was originally developed by the Chinese military based upon the study and practices of traditional Kung fu and modern combat fighting techniques.

A total of 10 men from 10 different countries competed in this event, limited to fighters whose body weight was less than 52 kilograms.

Xing Zhijie from China won the gold medal after beating Rolly Chulhang of the Philippines in gold medal bout 2–0, The bronze medal was shared by Teerawat Donniart from Thailand and Phoukhong Khamsounthone of Laos.

== Schedule ==
All times are Indochina Time (UTC+07:00)

Date	Time	Event
Wednesday, 16 December 1998	14:00	Round of 16
Thursday, 17 December 1998	14:00	Quarterfinals
Friday, 18 December 1998	14:00	Semifinals
Saturday, 19 December 1998	14:00	Final

== Results ==
Round of 16
Nguyễn Chí Sơn (VIE)	2
Satya Man Lama (NEP)	0
Rolly Chulhang (PHI)	2
Alireza Saadat (IRI)	0

Quarterfinals
Xing Zhijie (CHN)	2
Nguyễn Chí Sơn (VIE)	0
Teerawat Donniart (THA)	2
Lee Hou-cheng (TPE)	1
Phoukhong Khamsounthone (LAO)	2
Em Sothearath (CAM)	0
Rolly Chulhang (PHI)	2
Saken Aubakirov (KAZ)	0

Semifinals
Xing Zhijie (CHN)	2
Teerawat Donniart (THA)	0
Phoukhong Khamsounthone (LAO)	0
Rolly Chulhang (PHI)	2

Final
Xing Zhijie (CHN)	2
Rolly Chulhang (PHI)	0
