= Wrestling at the 1998 Asian Games – Men's freestyle 97 kg =

Men's freestyle 97 kg at the 1998 Asian Games
- Venue: Thammasat Gymnasium 1
- Dates: 16–17 December 1998
- Competitors: 10 from 10 nations

Medalists
gold medal	Abbas Jadidi	Iran
silver medal	Dolgorsürengiin Sumiyaabazar	Mongolia
bronze medal	Soslan Fraev	Uzbekistan

The men's freestyle 97 kilograms wrestling competition at the 1998 Asian Games in Bangkok was held on 16 December and 17 December at the Thammasat Gymnasium 1.

The gold and silver medalists were determined by the final match of the main single-elimination bracket. The losers advanced to the repechage. These matches determined the bronze medalist for the event.

== Schedule ==
All times are Indochina Time (UTC+07:00)

Date	Time	Event
Wednesday, 16 December 1998	09:00	Round 1
Wednesday, 16 December 1998	16:00	Round 2
Wednesday, 16 December 1998	16:00	Round 3
Thursday, 17 December 1998	09:00	Round 4
Thursday, 17 December 1998	16:00	Finals

== Results ==
=== Round 1 ===
	Score		CP
1/8 finals
Soslan Fraev (UZB)	10–0	Yao Chen-hung (TPE)	4–0 ST
Islam Bayramukov (KAZ)	10–0	Moustafa Saleh (LIB)	4–0 ST
Ba Tumengke (CHN)	0–10	Abbas Jadidi (IRI)	0–4 ST
Kim Kil-soo (KOR)	12–0	Brammadev Yadav (NEP)	4–0 ST
Dolgorsürengiin Sumiyaabazar (MGL)	4–1	Hiroshi Kosuge (JPN)	3–1 PP

=== Round 2 ===
	Score		CP
Quarterfinals
Soslan Fraev (UZB)	4–3	Islam Bayramukov (KAZ)	3–1 PP
Abbas Jadidi (IRI)		Bye	
Kim Kil-soo (KOR)		Bye	
Dolgorsürengiin Sumiyaabazar (MGL)		Bye	
Repechage
Yao Chen-hung (TPE)	6–0 Fall	Moustafa Saleh (LIB)	4–0 TO
Ba Tumengke (CHN)	3–0 Fall	Brammadev Yadav (NEP)	4–0 TO
Hiroshi Kosuge (JPN)		Bye	

=== Round 3 ===
	Score		CP
Semifinals
Soslan Fraev (UZB)	0–4	Abbas Jadidi (IRI)	0–3 PO
Kim Kil-soo (KOR)	0–3	Dolgorsürengiin Sumiyaabazar (MGL)	0–3 PO
Repechage
Hiroshi Kosuge (JPN)	10–0	Yao Chen-hung (TPE)	4–0 ST
Ba Tumengke (CHN)	0–10	Islam Bayramukov (KAZ)	0–4 ST

=== Round 4 ===
	Score		CP
Repechage
Soslan Fraev (UZB)	7–0	Hiroshi Kosuge (JPN)	3–0 PO
Islam Bayramukov (KAZ)	6–0	Kim Kil-soo (KOR)	3–0 PO

=== Finals ===
	Score		CP
Bronze medal match
Soslan Fraev (UZB)	5–1	Islam Bayramukov (KAZ)	3–1 PP
Gold medal match
Abbas Jadidi (IRI)	3–0	Dolgorsürengiin Sumiyaabazar (MGL)	3–0 PO

== Final standing ==
Rank	Athlete
1st place, gold medalist(s)	Abbas Jadidi (IRI)
2nd place, silver medalist(s)	Dolgorsürengiin Sumiyaabazar (MGL)
3rd place, bronze medalist(s)	Soslan Fraev (UZB)
4	Islam Bayramukov (KAZ)
5	Hiroshi Kosuge (JPN)
6	Kim Kil-soo (KOR)
7	Yao Chen-hung (TPE)
8	Ba Tumengke (CHN)
9	Moustafa Saleh (LIB)
9	Brammadev Yadav (NEP)
