= Wushu at the 1998 Asian Games – Men's sanshou 65 kg =

Men's sanshou 65 kg at the 1998 Asian Games
- Venue: Thammasat Gymnasium 6
- Dates: 16–19 December 1998
- Competitors: 9 from 9 nations

Medalists
gold medal	You Bangmeng	China
silver medal	Hsu Chin-kun	Chinese Taipei
bronze medal	Trần Đức Trang	Vietnam
bronze medal	Dias Zhamash	Kazakhstan

The men's sanshou 65 kilograms at the 1998 Asian Games in Bangkok, Thailand was held from 16 to 19 December at the Thammasat Gymnasium 6.

Sanda, formerly knows as Sanshou is the official Chinese full contact combat sport. Sanda (Sanshou) is a fighting system which was originally developed by the Chinese military based upon the study and practices of traditional Kung fu and modern combat fighting techniques.

9 men from 9 countries competed in this event, limited to fighters whose body weight was less than 65 kilograms.

You Bangmeng from China won the gold medal after beating You Bangmeng of Chinese Taipei in gold medal bout 2–0, The bronze medal was shared by Trần Đức Trang and Dias Zhamash.

== Schedule ==
All times are Indochina Time (UTC+07:00)

Date	Time	Event
Wednesday, 16 December 1998	14:00	Round of 16
Thursday, 17 December 1998	14:00	Quarterfinals
Friday, 18 December 1998	14:00	Semifinals
Saturday, 19 December 1998	14:00	Final

== Results ==
Round of 16
Batjargalyn Ganzorig (MGL)	0
Ronald Bingwaoel (PHI)	2

Quarterfinals
You Bangmeng (CHN)	2
Ronald Bingwaoel (PHI)	0
Trần Đức Trang (VIE)	2
P. Phalangthong (LAO)	0
Mansour Norouzi (IRI)	1
Dias Zhamash (KAZ)	2
Hsu Chin-kun (TPE)	2
Chatree Chalieosil (THA)	0

Semifinals
You Bangmeng (CHN)	2
Trần Đức Trang (VIE)	0
Dias Zhamash (KAZ)	0
Hsu Chin-kun (TPE)	2

Final
You Bangmeng (CHN)	2
Hsu Chin-kun (TPE)	0
