= 1996 in the decathlon =

This page lists the World Best Year Performance in the year 1996 in the men's decathlon. One of the main events during this season were the 1996 Olympic Games in Atlanta, Georgia, where the competition started on July 31, 1996, and ended on August 1, 1996.

== Records ==
Standing records prior to the 1996 season in track and field
World Record	Dan O'Brien (USA)	8891	September 5, 1992	Talence, France

== 1996 World Year Ranking ==
Rank	Points	Athlete	Venue	Date	Note
1	8824	Dan O'Brien (USA)	Atlanta, United States	1996-08-01	
2	8706	Frank Busemann (GER)	Atlanta, United States	1996-08-01	PB
3	8664	Tomáš Dvořák (CZE)	Atlanta, United States	1996-08-01	
4	8644	Steve Fritz (USA)	Atlanta, United States	1996-08-01	PB
5	8626	Michael Smith (CAN)	Götzis, Austria	1996-05-26	NR
6	8613	Eduard Hämäläinen (BLR)	Atlanta, United States	1996-08-01	
7	8546	Chris Huffins (USA)	Atlanta, United States	1996-06-22	
8	8543	Erki Nool (EST)	Atlanta, United States	1996-08-01	
9	8425	Robert Změlík (CZE)	Talence, France	1996-09-15	
10	8404	Ricky Barker (USA)	College Station, United States	1996-03-15	PB
11	8393	Sébastien Levicq (FRA)	Talence, France	1996-09-15	
12	8345	Kip Janvrin (USA)	Atlanta, United States	1996-06-22	
13	8318	Ramil Ganiyev (UZB)	Atlanta, United States	1996-08-01	
14	8315	Lev Lobodin (RUS)	Götzis, Austria	1996-05-26	
15	8307	Antonio Peñalver (ESP)	Atlanta, United States	1996-08-01	
16	8282	Christian Plaziat (FRA)	Atlanta, United States	1996-08-01	
17	8274	Jón Arnar Magnússon (ISL)	Atlanta, United States	1996-08-01	
18	8256	Kamil Damašek (CZE)	Lage, Germany	1996-06-16	PB
19	8253	Frank Müller (GER)	Atlanta, United States	1996-08-01	
20	8249	Sebastian Chmara (POL)	Atlanta, United States	1996-08-01	
21	8230	Michael Kohnle (GER)	Bernhausen, Germany	1996-06-16	
22	8227	Andrew Fucci (USA)	Atlanta, United States	1996-06-22	PB
23	8216	Oleg Veretelnikov (UZB)	Tashkent, Uzbekistan	1996-06-06	
24	8210	Roman Šebrle (CZE)	Prague, Czech Republic	1996-07-10	
25	8189	Raúl Duany (CUB)	Santiago de Cuba, Cuba	1996-02-10	

== See also ==
- 1996 Hypo-Meeting
- Athletics at the 1996 Summer Olympics – Men's decathlon
