= Manijeh (given name) =

Manijeh, also romanized Manizheh (Iranian Persian: منیژه, romanized: Maniže; from Classical Persian منیژه Manēža) is a Persian feminine given name. It is most famously borne by the legendary princess Manijeh, daughter of Afrasiab in the Shahnameh, an epic by Ferdowsi. The name is used across Persian-speaking regions, with the modern Eastern variant being Manizha (Afghan Persian: منیژه, romanized: Manīža; Tajik Persian: Манижа, romanized: Maniža).

== Given name ==
=== Manijeh ===
- Manijeh Hekmat (born 1962), Iranian film director
- Manijeh Kazemi (born 1974) is an Iranian sport shooter
- Manijeh Razeghi (born 1942), Iranian-American scientist

=== Manizha ===
- Manizha Dalerovna Sangin (born 1991), Tajikistani-born Russian singer
- Manizha Bakhtari, Afghan diplomat
- Manizha Talash (born 2002), Afghan breakdancer
- Manizha Wafeq, Afghan entrepreneur

== Sources ==
- Steingass, Francis Joseph (1892). "منیژه". A Comprehensive Persian-English Dictionary.
