= Boxing at the 1998 Asian Games – Men's +91 kg =

Boxing competitions

Men's +91 kg at the 1998 Asian Games
- Venue: Land Sports Complex
- Date: 13–18 December 1998
- Competitors: 7 from 7 nations

Medalists
gold medal	Mukhtarkhan Dildabekov	Kazakhstan
silver medal	Mohammad Reza Samadi	Iran
bronze medal	Lazizbek Zokirov	Uzbekistan
bronze medal	Shahid Hussain	Pakistan

The men's super heavyweight boxing competition at the 1998 Asian Games in Bangkok, Thailand was held from 13 to 18 December at the Land Sports Complex.

Like all Asian Games boxing events, the competition was a straight single-elimination tournament. This event consisted of 7 boxers. The competition began with the quarterfinal round on 13 December, where the number of competitors was reduced to 4, and concluded with the final on 18 December. As there were fewer than 8 boxers in the competition, Mukhtarkhan Dildabekov received a bye through the quarterfinal round. Both semi-final losers were awarded bronze medals.

All bouts consisted of five three-minute rounds. The boxers receive points for every successful punch they land on their opponent's head or upper body. The boxer with the most points at the end of the bouts wins. If a boxer is knocked to the ground and cannot get up before the referee counts to 10 then the bout is over and the opponent wins.

== Schedule ==
All times are Indochina Time (UTC+07:00)

Date	Time	Event
Sunday, 13 December 1998	14:00	Quarterfinals
Tuesday, 15 December 1998	14:00	Semifinals
Friday, 18 December 1998	14:00	Final

== Results ==
Legend

- KO — Won by knockout

Quarterfinals
Lazizbek Zokirov (UZB)	10
Ali Mansour (LIB)	7
Shahid Hussain (PAK)	19
Harpal Singh (IND)	7
Mohammad Reza Samadi (IRI)	10
Abuduxikeer Mijiti (CHN)	3

Semifinals
Mukhtarkhan Dildabekov (KAZ)	9
Lazizbek Zokirov (UZB)	5
Shahid Hussain (PAK)	8
Mohammad Reza Samadi (IRI)	15

Final
Mukhtarkhan Dildabekov (KAZ)	KO
Mohammad Reza Samadi (IRI)
