= Wushu at the 1998 Asian Games – Men's sanshou 70 kg =

Men's sanshou 70 kg at the 1998 Asian Games
- Venue: Thammasat Gymnasium 6
- Dates: 16–19 December 1998
- Competitors: 6 from 6 nations

Medalists
gold medal	Xiao Xiaobang	China
silver medal	Hossein Ojaghi	Iran
bronze medal	Oon Srikolam	Thailand
bronze medal	Jerome Lumabas	Philippines

The men's sanshou 70 kilograms at the 1998 Asian Games in Bangkok, Thailand was held from 16 to 19 December at the Thammasat Gymnasium 6.

== Schedule ==
All times are Indochina Time (UTC+07:00)

Date	Time	Event
Wednesday, 16 December 1998	14:00	Quarterfinals
Thursday, 17 December 1998	14:00	Semifinals
Friday, 18 December 1998	14:00	Semifinals
Saturday, 19 December 1998	14:00	Final

== Results ==
Quarterfinals		Semifinals		Final
		Xiao Xiaobang (CHN)	2
Oon Srikolam (THA)	2	Oon Srikolam (THA)	0
Wu Fen-mo (TPE)	0			Xiao Xiaobang (CHN)	2
Phùng Anh Tuấn (VIE)	0			Hossein Ojaghi (IRI)	1
Jerome Lumabas (PHI)	2	Jerome Lumabas (PHI)	0
		Hossein Ojaghi (IRI)	2
