= Athletics at the 1998 Asian Games – Men's 3000 metres steeplechase =

Men's 3000 metres steeplechase at the 1998 Asian Games
- Venue: Thammasat Stadium
- Dates: 15 December 1998
- Competitors: 6 from 4 nations

Medalists
| gold medal | Yasunori Uchitomi | Japan |
| silver medal | Hamid Sajjadi | Iran |
| bronze medal | Jafar Babakhani | Iran |

The men's 3000 metres steeplechase competition at the 1998 Asian Games in Bangkok, Thailand was held on 15 December at the Thammasat Stadium.

== Schedule ==
All times are Indochina Time (UTC+07:00)

| Date | Time | Event |
|---|---|---|
| Tuesday, 15 December 1998 | 16:20 | Final |

== Results ==
Legend

- DNF — Did not finish

| Rank | Athlete | Time | Notes |
|---|---|---|---|
| 1st place, gold medalist(s) | Yasunori Uchitomi (JPN) | 8:41.00 | |
| 2nd place, silver medalist(s) | Hamid Sajjadi (IRI) | 8:42.53 | |
| 3rd place, bronze medalist(s) | Jafar Babakhani (IRI) | 8:55.04 | |
| 4 | Jirasak Suthichat (THA) | 9:04.69 | |
| 5 | Nanthakorn Chookeaw (THA) | 9:24.15 | |
| — | Djamched Rasulov (TJK) | DNF | |
