= 1999 Asian Weightlifting Championships =

International weightlifting competition

The 1999 Asian Weightlifting Championships were held in Wuhan, China between August 29 and September 5, 1999. It was the 31st men's and 12th women's championship. The event was organised by the Asian Weightlifting Federation.

== Medal summary ==
=== Men ===
Event	Gold		Silver		Bronze	
56 kg
Snatch	Liao Weixiao; China	122.5 kg	Yang Chin-yi; Chinese Taipei	120.0 kg	Wang Shin-yuan; Chinese Taipei	115.0 kg
Clean & Jerk	Wang Shin-yuan; Chinese Taipei	150.0 kg	Yang Chin-yi; Chinese Taipei	140.0 kg	Thandava Murthy Muthu; India	140.0 kg
Total	Wang Shin-yuan; Chinese Taipei	265.0 kg	Yang Chin-yi; Chinese Taipei	260.0 kg	Thandava Murthy Muthu; India	252.5 kg
62 kg
Snatch	Shi Zhiyong; China	147.5 kg	Mehdi Panzvan; Iran	130.0 kg	Lee Sang-hyuk; South Korea	122.5 kg
Clean & Jerk	Le Maosheng; China	175.0 kg	Shi Zhiyong; China	172.5 kg	Kim Young-tae; South Korea	165.0 kg
Total	Shi Zhiyong; China	320.0 kg	Kim Young-tae; South Korea	285.0 kg	Mehdi Panzvan; Iran	282.5 kg
69 kg
Snatch	Wan Jianhui; China	157.5 kg	Zhang Guozheng; China	155.0 kg	Javad Khoshdel; Iran	142.5 kg
Clean & Jerk	Zhang Guozheng; China	185.0 kg	Wan Jianhui; China	185.0 kg	Javad Khoshdel; Iran	180.0 kg
Total	Wan Jianhui; China	342.5 kg AR	Zhang Guozheng; China	340.0 kg	Javad Khoshdel; Iran	322.5 kg
77 kg
Snatch	Li Hongli; China	160.0 kg	Zhan Xugang; China	160.0 kg	Mohammad Hossein Barkhah; Iran	155.0 kg
Clean & Jerk	Zhan Xugang; China	206.0 kg WR	Kim Jong-shik; South Korea	192.5 kg	Li Hongli; China	190.0 kg
Total	Zhan Xugang; China	365.0 kg	Li Hongli; China	350.0 kg	Mohammad Hossein Barkhah; Iran	345.0 kg
85 kg
Snatch	Shahin Nassirinia; Iran	170.0 kg	Bakhyt Akhmetov; Kyrgyzstan	155.0 kg	Hassan Pasham; Iran	155.0 kg
Clean & Jerk	Shahin Nassirinia; Iran	200.0 kg	Hassan Pasham; Iran	187.5 kg	Yang Jae-woon; South Korea	180.0 kg
Total	Shahin Nassirinia; Iran	370.0 kg	Hassan Pasham; Iran	342.5 kg	Bakhyt Akhmetov; Kyrgyzstan	335.0 kg
94 kg
Snatch	Kourosh Bagheri; Iran	170.0 kg	Almaz Askeev; Kyrgyzstan	160.0 kg	Chun Yong-sung; South Korea	155.0 kg
Clean & Jerk	Kourosh Bagheri; Iran	210.5 kg AR	Chun Yong-sung; South Korea	205.0 kg	Almaz Askeev; Kyrgyzstan	192.5 kg
Total	Kourosh Bagheri; Iran	380.0 kg AR	Chun Yong-sung; South Korea	360.0 kg	Almaz Askeev; Kyrgyzstan	352.5 kg
105 kg
Snatch	Cui Wenhua; China	187.5 kg	Hossein Tavakkoli; Iran	175.0 kg	None awarded	
Clean & Jerk	Hossein Tavakkoli; Iran	225.5 kg AR	Cui Wenhua; China	207.5 kg	None awarded	
Total	Hossein Tavakkoli; Iran	400.0 kg	Cui Wenhua; China	395.0 kg	None awarded	
+105 kg
Snatch	Hossein Rezazadeh; Iran	200.0 kg AR	Dalbir Singh; India	165.0 kg	None awarded	
Clean & Jerk	Hossein Rezazadeh; Iran	230.0 kg	Dalbir Singh; India	197.5 kg	None awarded	
Total	Hossein Rezazadeh; Iran	430.0 kg	Dalbir Singh; India	362.5 kg	None awarded	

=== Women ===
Event	Gold		Silver		Bronze	
48 kg
Snatch	Li Zhuo; China	84.0 kg WR	Chu Nan-mei; Chinese Taipei	77.5 kg	Sanamacha Chanu; India	75.0 kg
Clean & Jerk	Li Zhuo; China	113.0 kg WR	Sanamacha Chanu; India	97.5 kg	Masumi Imaoka; Japan	90.0 kg
Total	Li Zhuo; China	195.0 kg WR	Sanamacha Chanu; India	172.5 kg	Chu Nan-mei; Chinese Taipei	167.5 kg
53 kg
Snatch	Li Feng-ying; Chinese Taipei	95.0 kg	Wang Xiufen; China	92.5 kg	Penphan Moonmongkol; Thailand	77.5 kg
Clean & Jerk	Li Feng-ying; Chinese Taipei	121.0 kg WR	Wang Xiufen; China	120.0 kg	Penphan Moonmongkol; Thailand	100.0 kg
Total	Li Feng-ying; Chinese Taipei	215.0 kg	Wang Xiufen; China	212.5 kg	Penphan Moonmongkol; Thailand	177.5 kg
58 kg
Snatch	Kuo Ping-chun; Chinese Taipei	95.0 kg	Ri Song-hui; North Korea	95.0 kg	Xu Xiongying; China	90.0 kg
Clean & Jerk	Ri Song-hui; North Korea	125.0 kg	Xu Xiongying; China	122.5 kg	Kuo Ping-chun; Chinese Taipei	115.0 kg
Total	Ri Song-hui; North Korea	220.0 kg	Xu Xiongying; China	212.5 kg	Kuo Ping-chun; Chinese Taipei	210.0 kg
63 kg
Snatch	Xu Xuefeng; China	97.5 kg	Yoon I-sook; South Korea	92.5 kg	Nansita Devi; India	80.0 kg
Clean & Jerk	Xu Xuefeng; China	117.5 kg	Yoon I-sook; South Korea	110.0 kg	Nansita Devi; India	105.0 kg
Total	Xu Xuefeng; China	215.0 kg	Yoon I-sook; South Korea	202.5 kg	Nansita Devi; India	185.0 kg
69 kg
Snatch	Lin Weining; China	110.0 kg	Huang Hsi-li; Chinese Taipei	105.0 kg	Miya Kageyama; Japan	77.5 kg
Clean & Jerk	Lin Weining; China	142.5 kg WR	Huang Hsi-li; Chinese Taipei	125.0 kg	Miya Kageyama; Japan	100.0 kg
Total	Lin Weining; China	252.5 kg WR	Huang Hsi-li; Chinese Taipei	230.0 kg	Miya Kageyama; Japan	177.5 kg
75 kg
Snatch	Tang Weifang; China	116.0 kg WR	Kuo Yi-hang; Chinese Taipei	107.5 kg	Kim Soon-hee; South Korea	102.5 kg
Clean & Jerk	Tang Weifang; China	141.0 kg WR	Kuo Yi-hang; Chinese Taipei	132.5 kg	Kim Soon-hee; South Korea	132.5 kg
Total	Tang Weifang; China	255.0 kg WR	Kuo Yi-hang; Chinese Taipei	240.0 kg	Kim Soon-hee; South Korea	235.0 kg
+75 kg
Snatch	Wang Yanmei; China	123.5 kg WR	Kim Dong-ok; South Korea	102.5 kg	Bharti Singh; India	100.0 kg
Clean & Jerk	Wang Yanmei; China	150.0 kg	Bharti Singh; India	130.0 kg	Kim Dong-ok; South Korea	130.0 kg
Total	Wang Yanmei; China	272.5 kg	Kim Dong-ok; South Korea	232.5 kg	Bharti Singh; India	230.0 kg

== Medal table ==
Ranking by Big (Total result) medals

Rank	Nation	Gold	Silver	Bronze	Total
1	China	8	5	0	13
2	Iran	4	1	3	8
3	Chinese Taipei	2	3	2	7
4	North Korea	1	0	0	1
5	South Korea	0	4	1	5
6	India	0	2	3	5
7	Kyrgyzstan	0	0	2	2
8	Japan	0	0	1	1
8	Thailand	0	0	1	1
Totals (9 entries)		15	15	13	43

Ranking by all medals: Big (Total result) and Small (Snatch and Clean & Jerk)

Rank	Nation	Gold	Silver	Bronze	Total
1	China	26	13	2	41
2	Iran	11	4	7	22
3	Chinese Taipei	6	10	4	20
4	North Korea	2	1	0	3
5	South Korea	0	9	8	17
6	India	0	6	8	14
7	Kyrgyzstan	0	2	3	5
8	Japan	0	0	4	4
9	Thailand	0	0	3	3
Totals (9 entries)		45	45	39	129

== Participating nations ==
71 athletes from 9 nations competed.

- China (15)
- Chinese Taipei (12)
- India (12)
- Iran (8)
- Japan (6)
- Kyrgyzstan (4)
- North Korea (1)
- South Korea (9)
- Thailand (4)
