= Hossein Ojaghi =

Iranian martial artist (born 1975)

Medal record

Representing Iran

Men's Sanshou

Olympic Games (unofficial)
Silver medal – second place	2008 Beijing	85 kg

Asian Games
Gold medal – first place	2002 Busan	70 kg
Silver medal – second place	1998 Bangkok	70 kg

World Championships
Gold medal – first place	1997 Rome	75 kg
Gold medal – first place	1999 Hong Kong	75 kg
Gold medal – first place	2009 Toronto	80 kg
Silver medal – second place	2001 Yerevan	75 kg
Silver medal – second place	2007 Beijing	85 kg
Bronze medal – third place	2003 Macau	75 kg

Hossein Ojaghi (Persian: حسین اجاقی, born 30 August 1975 in Tehran) is a former competitive wushu athlete and sanshou fighter from Iran. He has had an impressive run as a competitive wushu athlete from the late 1990s to the late 2000s and became world champion in 1997, 1999 and 2009, as well as won medals in the Asian Games and the 2008 Beijing Wushu Tournament.

== Achievements ==
- 1997 World Wushu Championships (gold)
- 1998 Asian Games (silver)
- 1999 World Wushu Championships (gold)
- 2000 Asian Wushu Championships (gold)
- 2001 World Wushu Championships (silver)
- 2002 Sanshou World Cup (gold)
- 2002 Asian Games (gold)
- 2003 World Wushu Championships (bronze)
- 2004 Asian Wushu Championships (gold)
- 2007 World Wushu Championships (silver)
- 2008 Asian Wushu Championships (gold)
- 2008 Wushu Tournament Beijing (silver)
- 2008 Sanshou World Cup (gold)
- 2009 World Wushu Championships (gold)
