= Abbas Jadidi =

Iranian wrestler (born 1969)

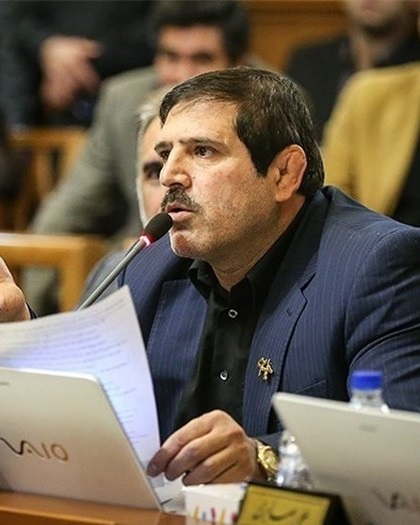

Member of City Council of Tehran
- In office 3 September 2013 – 22 August 2017

Personal details
- Born: 13 January 1969 (age 57) Tehran, Imperial State of Iran
- Party: Independent
- Sports career
- Country: Iran
- Sport: freestyle wrestling
Medal record
Men's freestyle wrestling
Olympic Games
| Silver medal – second place | 1996 Atlanta | 100 kg |
World Championships
| Gold medal – first place | 1998 Tehran | 97 kg |
| Bronze medal – third place | 1995 Atlanta | 100 kg |
| Bronze medal – third place | 1999 Ankara | 130 kg |
Asian Games
| Gold medal – first place | 1998 Bangkok | 97 kg |
| Silver medal – second place | 2002 Busan | 120 kg |
Asian Championships
| Gold medal – first place | 1993 Ulaanbaatar | 100 kg |
| Gold medal – first place | 1996 Xiaoshan | 100 kg |
| Silver medal – second place | 1992 Tehran | 90 kg |

Abbas Jadidi (Persian: عباس جدیدی; born 13 January 1969) is an Iranian wrestler who competed in the Freestyle Heavyweight (90–100 kg) category at the 1996 Summer Olympics, losing to Kurt Angle and winning the silver medal. He won the 1993 FILA World Wrestling Championships, but later tested positive for a banned substance. He was stripped of the title and suspended from competing for two years for doping. He was elected as a member of Tehran City Council in 2013 local elections.
