= Hamid Reza Babaei =

Iranian footballer

Hamidreza Babaei
Personal information
- Full name: Hamidreza Babaei
- Date of birth: 22 April 1975 (age 51)
- Place of birth: Iran
- Position: Goalkeeper

Team information
- Current team: Esteghlal Ahvaz

Senior career*
Years	Team	Apps	(Gls)
1998–1999	Esteghlal		
- Pegah Gilan
2006–2010	Esteghlal Ahvaz	73	(0)
- * Club domestic league appearances and goals

Hamidreza Babaei (born April 22, 1975) is an Iranian footballer. He currently plays for Esteghlal Ahvaz F.C. in the IPL.

== Career ==
Babaei has been with Esteghlal Ahvaz F.C. since 2006.

=== Club Career Statistics ===
Last Update 12 May 2010

Club performance			League		Cup		Continental		Total	
Season	Club	League	Apps	Goals	Apps	Goals	Apps	Goals	Apps	Goals
Iran			League		Hazfi Cup		Asia		Total	
2006–07	Esteghlal Ahvaz	IPL	24	0		0	-	-		0
2007–08	Esteghlal Ahvaz	IPL	18	0		0	-	-		0
2008–09	Esteghlal Ahvaz	IPL	27	0		0	-	-		0
2009–10	Esteghlal Ahvaz	IPL	4	0		0	-	-		0
Total	Iran		73	0		0	0	0		0
Career total			73	0		0	0	0		0
