= Mehdi Panzvan =

Iranian weightlifter (born 1981)

Personal information
- Native name: سید مهدی پانزوان لنگرودی
- Full name: Seyed Mahdi Panzvan Langroudi
- Nationality: Iranian
- Born: 17 February 1981 (age 45)
- Weight: 67.79 kg (149.5 lb)

Sport
- Country: Iran
- Sport: Weightlifting
- Event: 69 kg

Achievements and titles
- Personal bests: Snatch: 150 kg (2002); Clean and jerk: 180 kg (2002); Total: 325 kg (2002)
Medal record
Men's weightlifting
Representing Iran
Asian Games
Bronze medal – third place	1998 Bangkok	56 kg
Bronze medal – third place	2002 Busan	69 kg
Asian Championships
Bronze medal – third place	1999 Wuhan	62 kg

Seyed Mahdi Panzvan Langroudi (Persian: سید مهدی پانزوان لنگرودی; born 17 February 1981) is an Iranian weightlifter. He won the bronze medal in the Men's 62 kg weight class at the 1999 Asian Weightlifting Championships.

== Major result ==
Year	Venue	Weight	Snatch (kg)				Clean & Jerk (kg)				Total	Rank
Year	Venue	Weight	1	2	3	Rank	1	2	3	Rank	Total	Rank
Olympic Games
2000	Sydney, Australia	62 kg	~~140~~	140	~~145~~	5	162.5	~~172.5~~	~~172.5~~	7	302.5	5
2004	Athen, Greece	69 kg	147.5	~~152.5~~	~~152.5~~	4	~~172.5~~	~~172.5~~	~~172.5~~	--	--	--
World Championships
2002	Warsaw, Poland	69 kg	~~145~~	~~145~~	~~145~~	--	175	180	~~185~~	6	--	--
2003	Vancouver, Canada	69 kg	135	140	145	7	167.5	~~172.5~~	172.5	14	317.5	10
Asian Games
1998	Bangkok, South Korea	56 kg	122.5			1	145			4	267.5	3rd place, bronze medalist(s)
2002	Busan, South Korea	69 kg	~~145~~	145	150	3	175	~~180~~	~~180~~	3	325	3rd place, bronze medalist(s)
2010	Guangzhou, China	69 kg	143	147	~~149~~	1	173	~~176~~	~~176~~	4	320	4
Asian Championships
1999	Wuhan, China	62 kg	130			2nd place, silver medalist(s)	152.5			6	282.5	3rd place, bronze medalist(s)
2003	Qinhuangdao, China	77 kg	150			5	170			6	320	6
World Junior Championships
1997	Cape Town, South Africa	54 kg	90	~~95~~	95	7	112.5	117.5	~~122.5~~	8	212.5	7
1998	Sofia, Bulgaria	56 kg	107.5	~~112.5~~	~~112.5~~	6	130	135	~~137.5~~	4	242.5	5
2001	Thessaloniki, Greece	62 kg	~~125~~	~~127.5~~	~~127.5~~	--	--	--	--	--	--	--
