= Kourosh Bagheri =

Iranian weightlifter (born 1977)

Personal information
- Nationality: Iranian
- Born: 21 September 1977 (age 48) Kermanshah, Iran
- Height: 182 cm (6 ft 0 in)
- Weight: 93.31 kg (205.7 lb)
- Awards: Order of Courage (3rd class)

Sport
- Sport: Weightlifting
- Event: 94 kg

Achievements and titles
- Personal bests: Snatch: 187.5 kg (2000,OR); Clean and jerk: 222.5 kg (2001); Total: 407.5 kg (2001)
Medal record
Men's weightlifting
Representing Iran
World Championships
Gold medal – first place	2001 Antalya	94 kg
Asian Games
Silver medal – second place	1998 Bangkok	94 kg
Silver medal – second place	2002 Busan	94 kg
Asian Championships
Gold medal – first place	1999 Wuhan	94 kg
Gold medal – first place	2003 Qinhuangdao	94 kg

Kourosh Bagheri (Persian: كوروش باقری, born 21 September 1977) is a former Iranian weightlifter who won the gold medal in the Men's 94 kg weight class at the 2001 World Weightlifting Championships. Bagheri was also holding the Asian Record of Snatch in 94 kg at the 2000 Summer Olympics in Sydney, as well as the Asian Record of Total in 94 kg at the 2001 World Weightlifting Championships. He was the head coach of Iran's weightlifting team at the London Olympics in summer 2012 in which he coached Iranian weightlifters who won three gold and two silver medals.

== Major results ==
Year	Venue	Weight	Snatch (kg)				Clean & Jerk (kg)				Total	Rank
Year	Venue	Weight	1	2	3	Rank	1	2	3	Rank	Total	Rank
Olympic Games
2000	Sydney, Australia	94 kg	180	187.5	~~190~~	2	215	~~220~~	~~220~~	7	402.5	4
World Championships
1999	Athens, Greece	94 kg	175	~~180~~	180	5	210	~~217.5~~	~~217.5~~	11	390	9
2001	Antalya, Turkey	94 kg	~~185~~	~~185~~	185	1st place, gold medalist(s)	215	220	222.5	3rd place, bronze medalist(s)	407.5	1st place, gold medalist(s)
2002	Warsaw, Poland	94 kg	~~177.5~~	~~177.5~~	~~180~~	--	210	~~215~~	~~217.5~~	3rd place, bronze medalist(s)	--	--
2003	Vancouver, Canada	94 kg	175	~~180~~	~~180~~	9	~~207.5~~	207.5	~~212.5~~	9	382.5	8
Asian Games
1998	Bangkok, Thailand	94 kg	175			2	202.5			5	377.5	2nd place, silver medalist(s)
2002	Busan, South Korea	94 kg	~~175~~	175	~~180~~	3	210	~~225~~	--	2	385	2nd place, silver medalist(s)
Asian Championships
1999	Wuhan, China	94 kg	170			2nd place, silver medalist(s)	210			1st place, gold medalist(s)	380.5	1st place, gold medalist(s)
2003	Qinhuangdao, China	94 kg	170			1st place, gold medalist(s)	202.5			1st place, gold medalist(s)	372.5	1st place, gold medalist(s)
World Junior Championships
1996	Warsaw, Poland	83 kg	140	150	152.5	4	172.5	~~175~~	175	8	325	4
1997	Cape Town, South Africa	91 kg	~~155~~	155	162.5	1st place, gold medalist(s)	185	190	~~197.5~~	4	352.5	1st place, gold medalist(s)
