= Shahin Nassirinia =

Iranian weightlifter (born 1976)

Personal information
- Nationality: Iranian
- Born: 25 February 1976 (age 50)
- Height: 180 cm (5 ft 11 in)
- Weight: 92.89 kg (204.8 lb)

Sport
- Country: Iran
- Sport: Weightlifting
- Event: 94 kg

Achievements and titles
- Personal bests: Snatch: 175 kg (1999); Clean and jerk: 220 kg (2004); Total: 392.5 kg (2004)
Medal record
Men's weightlifting
Representing Iran
World Championships
Gold medal – first place	1999 Athens	85 kg
Asian Games
Gold medal – first place	1998 Bangkok	85 kg
Asian Championships
Gold medal – first place	1999 Wuhan	85 kg
Bronze medal – third place	2004 Almaty	94 kg
West Asian Games
Gold medal – first place	1997 Tehran	83 kg

Shahin Nassirinia (Persian: شاهین نصیری‌نیا, born 25 February 1976 in Shiraz) is an Iranian weightlifter who won the gold medal in the Men's 85 kg weight class at the 1999 World Weightlifting Championships. He participated in the 2000 Summer Olympics in Sydney, but was injured performing his first attempt at the snatch.

== Major results ==
Year	Venue	Weight	Snatch (kg)				Clean & Jerk (kg)				Total	Rank
Year	Venue	Weight	1	2	3	Rank	1	2	3	Rank	Total	Rank
Olympic Games
2000	Sydney, Australia	85 kg	~~175~~	--	--	--	--	--	--	--	--	--
2004	Athens, Greece	94 kg	172.5	~~177.5~~	~~177.5~~	11	215	220	~~225~~	2	392.5	4
World Championships
1999	Athens, Greece	85 kg	170	175	~~177.5~~	4	205	210	215	1st place, gold medalist(s)	390	1st place, gold medalist(s)
2001	Antalya, Turkey	85 kg	~~172.5~~	~~172.5~~	172.5	4	~~210~~	~~210~~	~~215~~	--	--	--
Asian Games
1998	Bangkok, Thailand	85 kg	170			1	210			1	380	1st place, gold medalist(s)
2002	Busan, South Korea	85 kg	~~170~~	~~170~~	~~170~~	--	--	--	--	--	--	--
Asian Championships
1999	Wuhan, China	85 kg	170			1st place, gold medalist(s)	200			1st place, gold medalist(s)	370	1st place, gold medalist(s)
2004	Almaty, Kazakhstan	94 kg	165			4	210			2nd place, silver medalist(s)	375	3rd place, bronze medalist(s)
World Junior Championships
1996	Warsaw, Poland	76 kg	142.5	147.5	~~150~~	4	170	~~180~~	180	3rd place, bronze medalist(s)	327.5	3rd place, bronze medalist(s)
