= Oleg Veretelnikov =

Uzbekistani decathlete

Medal record

Men's athletics

Representing Uzbekistan

Asian Championships
Gold medal – first place	1993 Manila	Decathlon

Oleg Veretelnikov (Олег Веретелников; born 20 January 1972) is a retired Uzbekistani decathlete.

== Achievements ==
Year	Competition	Venue	Position	Event	Notes
Representing Uzbekistan
1993	Asian Championships	Manila, Philippines	1st	Decathlon	
1994	Asian Games	Hiroshima, Japan	2nd	Decathlon	
1997	World Championships	Athens, Greece	20th	Decathlon	
1997	Central Asian Games	Almaty, Kazakhstan	1st	Decathlon	
1998	Asian Games	Bangkok, Thailand	1st	Decathlon	
1999	Hypo-Meeting	Götzis, Austria	15th	Decathlon	
1999	World Championships	Seville, Spain	11th	Decathlon	
