= Ramil Ganiyev =

Uzbekistani decathlete

Medal record

Men's athletics

Representing Uzbekistan

Asian Championships
Silver medal – second place	1993 Manila	Decathlon

Ramil Ganiyev (Рамиль Ганиев; born 23 September 1968 in Yangiabad, Tashkent Region) is a retired Uzbekistani decathlete of Tatar parents.

== Achievements ==
Year	Competition	Venue	Position	Notes
Representing Unified Team
1992	Olympic Games	Barcelona, Spain	8th	Decathlon
Representing Uzbekistan
1993	Hypo-Meeting	Götzis, Austria	24th	Decathlon
1993	World Championships	Stuttgart, Germany	15th	Decathlon
1993	Asian Championships	Manila, Philippines	2nd	Decathlon
1994	Hypo-Meeting	Götzis, Austria	17th	Decathlon
1994	Asian Games	Hiroshima, Japan	1st	Decathlon
1995	Hypo-Meeting	Götzis, Austria	10th	Decathlon
1995	World Championships	Gothenburg, Sweden	DNF	Decathlon
1996	Olympic Games	Atlanta, United States	8th	Decathlon
1997	Hypo-Meeting	Götzis, Austria	8th	Decathlon
1997	World Championships	Athens, Greece	5th	Decathlon
1998	Hypo-Meeting	Götzis, Austria	12th	Decathlon
1998	Asian Games	Bangkok, Thailand	2nd	Decathlon
