= Manijeh Kazemi =

Iranian sports shooter

Personal information
- Born: 15 June 1974 (age 52)

Sport
- Country: Iran
- Sport: Shooting

Manijeh Kazemi (Persian: منیژه کاظمی, born 15 June 1974) is an Iranian sport shooter. She competed at the 2000 Summer Olympics in Sydney, in the women's 10 metre air pistol.
