= Woo Chul =

South Korean swimmer (born 1978)

Personal information
- Full name: Woo Chul
- National team: South Korea
- Born: 20 June 1978 (age 48) Seoul, South Korea
- Height: 1.71 m (5 ft 7 in)
- Weight: 66 kg (146 lb)

Korean name
- Hangul: 우철
- RR: U Cheol
- MR: U Ch'ŏl

Sport
- Sport: Swimming
- Strokes: Freestyle
Medal record
Men's swimming
Representing South Korea
Asian Games
Silver medal – second place	1994 Hiroshima	4×200 m freestyle
Bronze medal – third place	1998 Bangkok	4×200 m freestyle

Woo Chul (Korean: 우철; born June 20, 1978, in Seoul) is a retired South Korean swimmer, who specialized in middle-distance freestyle events. He is a two-time Olympian (1996 and 2000), and a double medalist at the Asian Games (1994 and 1998).

Woo started his competitive swimming, as a 16-year-old South Korean teenager, at the 1994 Asian Games in Hiroshima, Japan. He helped the South Koreans earn a silver medal in the 4×200 m freestyle relay with a time of 7:33.61.

Woo's Olympic debut came at the 1996 Summer Olympics in Atlanta. He failed to reach the top 16 final in the 400 m freestyle, finishing thirtieth in a time of 4:03.11. He also placed fifteenth as a member of the South Korean team in the 4×200 m freestyle relay (7:45.98).

At the 1998 Asian Games in Bangkok, Thailand, Woo added a bronze medal to his collection for the South Korean swimming team in the 4×200 m freestyle relay. He also attempted for his first individual medal in the 400 m freestyle (4:00.66), but missed the podium by 0.22 seconds behind Hong Kong's Mark Kwok.

Woo competed only in two swimming events at the 2000 Summer Olympics in Sydney. He posted FINA B-standards of 1:53.44 (200 m freestyle) and 3:59.35 (400 m freestyle) from the Dong-A Swimming Tournament in Ulsan. On the first day of the Games, Woo placed twenty-seventh in the 400 m freestyle. He held off his rival Kwok by almost half the body length to lead the second heat in a lifetime best of 3:58.31. The following day, in the 200 m freestyle, Woo placed twenty-ninth on the morning prelims. Swimming in heat three, he came up short in second place by 0.27 of a second behind 17-year-old Damian Alleyne of Barbados, breaking a South Korean record of 1:53.02.
