= Hamed Rezakhani =

Iranian swimmer

Personal information
- Born: 1 January 1979 (age 47)

Sport
- Sport: Swimming

Hamed Rezakhani (born 1 January 1979) is an Iranian swimmer. He competed in the men's 1500 metre freestyle event at the 1996 Summer Olympics.

Rezakhani later served as head coach of the national open water swimming team.
