= Mongolia at the 1998 Asian Games =

- IOC code: MGL
- NOC: Mongolian National Olympic Committee

in Bangkok
- Medals Ranked 19th: Gold 2 Silver 2 Bronze 10 Total 14

Asian Games appearances (overview)
- 1974; 1978; 1982; 1986; 1990; 1994; 1998; 2002; 2006; 2010; 2014; 2018; 2022; 2026

Mongolia participated in the 1998 Asian Games held in Bangkok, Thailand from December 6, 1998, to December 20, 1998. Athletes from Mongolia succeeded in winning two golds, two silvers and ten bronzes, making total fourteen medals. Mongolia finished nineteenth in a medal table.

== Medal summary ==
=== Medals by sport ===
Sport	Gold	Silver	Bronze	Total
Boxing			3	3
Judo	2		4	6
Shooting			1	1
Wrestling		2	2	4
Total	2	2	10	14

=== Medalists ===
Medal	Athlete	Sport	Event
Gold	Khaliuny Boldbaatar	Judo	Men's 73 kg
Gold	Khishigbatyn Erdenet-Od	Judo	Women's 57 kg
Silver	Oyuunbilegiin Pürevbaatar	Wrestling	Men's freestyle 58 kg
Silver	Dolgorsürengiin Sumyaabazar	Wrestling	Men's 97 kg
Bronze	Erdenebaataryn Uuganbayar	Judo	Men's 66 kg
Bronze	Dashzevegiin Pürevsüren	Judo	Men's 90 kg
Bronze	Ochiryn Odgerel	Judo	Men's + 100 kg
Bronze	Sambuugiin Dashdulam	Judo	Women's 78 kg
Bronze	Buyantogtokhyn Tsogtbaatar	Wrestling	Men's 63 kg
Bronze	Gelegjamtsyn Ösökhbayar	Wrestling	Men's 130 kg
Bronze	Tümentsetsegiin Üitümen	Boxing	Men's 60 kg
Bronze	Densmaagiin Enkhsaikhan	Boxing	Men's 63.5 kg
Bronze	Batmönkhiin Enkhbayar	Boxing	Men's 71 kg
Bronze	Otryadyn Gündegmaa; Dorjsürengiin Mönkhbayar; Davaajantsangiin Oyuun	Shooting	Women's 25 metre pistol team
