= North Korea at the 1998 Asian Games =

- IOC code: PRK
- NOC: Olympic Committee of the Democratic People's Republic of Korea

in Bangkok
- Medals Ranked 8th: Gold 7 Silver 14 Bronze 12 Total 33

Asian Games appearances (overview)
- 1974; 1978; 1982; 1986; 1990; 1994; 1998; 2002; 2006; 2010; 2014; 2018; 2022; 2026

North Korea participated in the 1998 Asian Games held in Bangkok, Thailand from December 6, 1998 to December 20, 1998. Athletes from North Korea succeeded in winning 7 golds, 14 silvers and 12 bronzes, making total 33 medals. North Korea finished eighth in a medal table.
