= Kyrgyzstan at the 1998 Asian Games =

- IOC code: KGZ
- NOC: National Olympic Committee of the Republic of Kyrgyzstan

in Bangkok
- Medals Ranked 24th: Gold 0 Silver 3 Bronze 3 Total 6

Asian Games appearances (overview)
- 1994; 1998; 2002; 2006; 2010; 2014; 2018; 2022; 2026

Kyrgyzstan participated in the 1998 Asian Games held in Bangkok, Thailand from December 6, 1998, to December 20, 1998. Athletes from Kyrgyzstan succeeded in winning three silvers and same number of bronzes, making total six medals. Kyrgyzstan finished at 24th position in a medal table.
