= Syria at the 1998 Asian Games =

- IOC code: SYR
- NOC: Syrian Olympic Committee

in Bangkok
- Medals Ranked 26th: Gold 0 Silver 2 Bronze 4 Total 6

Asian Games appearances (overview)
- 1951; 1954; 1958; 1962; 1966; 1970; 1974; 1978; 1982; 1986; 1990; 1994; 1998; 2002; 2006; 2010; 2014; 2018; 2022; 2026

Syria (SYR) competed at the 1998 Asian Games in Bangkok, Thailand. The total medal tally was 6, of which 2 were silver and 4 were bronze medals.

== Medals ==
=== Silver ===
Wrestling

- Men's freestyle 69 kg: Ahmad al-Osta

=== Bronze ===
Swimming

- Men's 1500 m freestyle: Hisham Al-Masri

== See also ==
- Syria at the 2002 Asian Games
