= Nepal at the 1998 Asian Games =

- IOC code: NEP
- NOC: Nepal Olympic Committee

in Bangkok
- Medals Ranked 27th: Gold 0 Silver 1 Bronze 3 Total 4

Asian Games appearances (overview)
- 1951; 1954; 1958; 1962; 1966; 1970; 1974; 1978; 1982; 1986; 1990; 1994; 1998; 2002; 2006; 2010; 2014; 2018; 2022; 2026

Nepal participated in the 1998 Asian Games held in Bangkok, Thailand from December 6, 1998 to December 20, 1998. Athletes from Nepal succeeded in winning four total medals -- one silver and three bronzes. Nepal finished twenty-seventh in a medal table.
