= Kazakhstan at the 1998 Asian Games =

- IOC code: KAZ
- NOC: National Olympic Committee of the Republic of Kazakhstan

in Bangkok
- Competitors: 462
- Medals Ranked 5th: Gold 24 Silver 24 Bronze 30 Total 78

Asian Games appearances (overview)
- 1994; 1998; 2002; 2006; 2010; 2014; 2018; 2022; 2026

Kazakhstan participated in the 1998 Asian Games held in Bangkok, Thailand from December 6, 1998 to December 20, 1998. Athletes from Kazakhstan succeeded in winning 24 golds, 24 silvers and 30 bronzes, making total 78 medals. Kazakhstan finished fifth in a medal table, just one rank behind to host nation, Thailand.
