= Uzbekistan at the 1998 Asian Games =

- IOC code: UZB
- NOC: National Olympic Committee of the Republic of Uzbekistan

in Bangkok
- Medals Ranked 10th: Gold 6 Silver 22 Bronze 12 Total 40

Asian Games appearances (overview)
- 1994; 1998; 2002; 2006; 2010; 2014; 2018; 2022; 2026

Uzbekistan participated in the 1998 Asian Games held in Bangkok, Thailand from 6 December 1998 to 20 December 1998. Athletes from Uzbekistan succeeded in winning 6 golds, 22 silvers and 12 bronzes, making total 40 medals. Uzbekistan finished tenth in a medal table.
