= Thailand at the 1998 Asian Games =

- IOC code: THA
- NOC: National Olympic Committee of Thailand
- Website: www.olympicthai.or.th/eng (in English and Thai)

in Bangkok
- Medals Ranked 4th: Gold 24 Silver 26 Bronze 40 Total 90

Asian Games appearances (overview)
- 1951; 1954; 1958; 1962; 1966; 1970; 1974; 1978; 1982; 1986; 1990; 1994; 1998; 2002; 2006; 2010; 2014; 2018; 2022; 2026

Thailand was the host nation for the 1998 Asian Games in Bangkok on 6–20 December 1998. Thailand ended the games at 90 overall medals including 24 gold medals which is the best showing of Thailand ever since inception of Asian Games in 1951.
