= Bowling at the Asian Games =

- Governing bodies: IBF (World) / ABF (Asia)
- Events: 6 (men: 3; women: 3)

Games
- 1951; 1954; 1958; 1962; 1966; 1970; 1974; 1978; 1982; 1986; 1990; 1994; 1998; 2002; 2006; 2010; 2014; 2018; 2022; 2026
- Medalists; Records

Bowling events have been contested at every Asian Games since 1978 Asian Games in Bangkok. After not being included in 1982 and 1990.

== Editions ==
| Games | Year | Host city | Best nation |
|---|---|---|---|
| VIII | 1978 | Bangkok, Thailand | Philippines |
| X | 1986 | Seoul, South Korea | Japan |
| XII | 1994 | Hiroshima, Japan | South Korea |
| XIII | 1998 | Bangkok, Thailand | Chinese Taipei |
| XIV | 2002 | Busan, South Korea | South Korea |
| XV | 2006 | Doha, Qatar | South Korea |
| XVI | 2010 | Guangzhou, China | South Korea |
| XVII | 2014 | Incheon, South Korea | South Korea |
| XVIII | 2018 | Jakarta–Palembang, Indonesia | South Korea |

== Events ==
| Event | 78 | 86 | 94 | 98 | 02 | 06 | 10 | 14 | 18 | Years |
|---|---|---|---|---|---|---|---|---|---|---|
| Men's singles | X | X | X | X | X | X | X | X | | 8 |
| Men's doubles | X | X | X | X | X | X | X | X | | 8 |
| Men's trios | X | X | X | X | X | X | X | X | X | 9 |
| Men's team | X | X | X | X | X | X | X | X | X | 9 |
| Men's all-events | | X | X | | | X | X | X | | 5 |
| Men's masters | X | X | X | X | X | X | X | X | X | 9 |
| Women's singles | X | X | X | X | X | X | X | X | | 8 |
| Women's doubles | X | X | X | X | X | X | X | X | | 8 |
| Women's trios | X | X | X | X | X | X | X | X | X | 9 |
| Women's team | X | X | X | X | X | X | X | X | X | 9 |
| Women's all-events | | X | X | | | X | X | X | | 5 |
| Women's masters | X | X | X | X | X | X | X | X | X | 9 |
| Total | 10 | 12 | 12 | 10 | 10 | 12 | 12 | 12 | 6 | |

== Medal table ==
| Rank | Nation | Gold | Silver | Bronze | Total |
|---|---|---|---|---|---|
| 1 | South Korea (KOR) | 33 | 22 | 23 | 78 |
| 2 | Japan (JPN) | 18 | 15 | 7 | 40 |
| 3 | Malaysia (MAS) | 12 | 13 | 7 | 32 |
| 4 | Chinese Taipei (TPE) | 9 | 6 | 9 | 24 |
| 5 | Philippines (PHI) | 7 | 8 | 8 | 23 |
| 6 | Thailand (THA) | 6 | 10 | 8 | 24 |
| 7 | Singapore (SGP) | 6 | 9 | 9 | 24 |
| 8 | Hong Kong (HKG) | 2 | 4 | 4 | 10 |
| 9 | Saudi Arabia (KSA) | 2 | 0 | 2 | 4 |
| 10 | Indonesia (INA) | 1 | 3 | 4 | 8 |
| 11 | United Arab Emirates (UAE) | 0 | 5 | 6 | 11 |
| 12 | Qatar (QAT) | 0 | 2 | 3 | 5 |
| 13 | Kuwait (KUW) | 0 | 2 | 0 | 2 |
| 14 | China (CHN) | 0 | 1 | 4 | 5 |
| Totals (14 entries) | | 96 | 100 | 94 | 290 |
