= Bowling at the 1998 Asian Games =

- Venue: P.S. Bowling Bangkapi
- Dates: 9–14 December 1998
- Competitors: 133 from 17 nations

Bowling took place for the men's and women's individual, doubles, trios, and team events at the 1998 Asian Games in P.S. Bowl of the Mall Shopping Center Bangkapi, Bangkok, Thailand from December 9 to December 14.

== Schedule ==
●	Round	●	Last round	P	Preliminary	F	Final

Event↓/Date →	9th Wed	10th Thu	11th Fri	12th Sat	13th Sun	14th Mon	
Men's singles	●						
Men's doubles		●					
Men's trios			●	●			
Men's team of 5			●	●			
Men's masters					P	P	F
Women's singles	●						
Women's doubles		●					
Women's trios			●	●			
Women's team of 5			●	●			
Women's masters					P	P	F

== Medalists ==
=== Men ===
Event	Gold	Silver	Bronze
Singles	Wu Fu-lung; Chinese Taipei	Kritchawat Jampakao; Thailand	Virgilio Sablan; Philippines
Doubles	Chinese Taipei; Wang Yu-jen; Cheng Chao-yu	Thailand; Prasert Panturat; Kritchawat Jampakao	South Korea; Kim Myung-jo; Park Young-su
Trios	Thailand; Prasert Panturat; Kritchawat Jampakao; Seri Krausing	Chinese Taipei; Wang Yu-jen; Wu Fu-lung; Cheng Chao-yu	United Arab Emirates; Sultan Al-Marzouqi; Mohammed Al-Qubaisi; Hulaiman Al-Hameli
Team of 5	Chinese Taipei; Wang Yu-jen; Lin Han-chen; Wu Fu-lung; Chen Chun-fu; Cheng Chao-yu; Wang Tien-fu	South Korea; Choi Byung-jae; Byun Ho-jin; Seo Kook; Suh Bom-sok; Kim Myung-jo; Park Young-su	Japan; Masaru Ito; Osamu Hamada; Kengo Tagata; Shigeo Saito; Kosei Wada; Yoshio Koike
Masters	Hui Cheung Kwok; Hong Kong	Wu Fu-lung; Chinese Taipei	Lin Han-chen; Chinese Taipei

=== Women ===
Event	Gold	Silver	Bronze
Singles	Lee Ji-yeon; South Korea	Lee Mi-young; South Korea	Sarah Yap; Malaysia
Doubles	South Korea; Lee Ji-yeon; Lee Mi-young	Thailand; Butsaracum Poskrisana; Supaporn Chuanprasertkit	Chinese Taipei; Tseng Su-fen; Chou Miao-lin
Trios	Chinese Taipei; Tseng Su-fen; Chou Miao-lin; Kuo Shu-chen	Thailand; Wannasiri Duangdee; Phetchara Kaewsuk; Supaporn Chuanprasertkit	Singapore; Jesmine Ho; Alice Tay; Grace Young
Team of 5	Chinese Taipei; Chou Miao-lin; Wang Yu-ling; Tseng Su-fen; Huang Chiung-yao; Kuo Shu-chen; Ku Hui-chin	South Korea; Kim Yeau-jin; Kim Hee-soon; Lee Mi-young; Lee Ji-yeon; Kim Sook-young; Cha Mi-jung	Japan; Mari Kimura; Ayano Katai; Shima Washizuka; Tomomi Shibata; Tomie Kawaguchi; Nachimi Itakura
Masters	Chou Miao-lin; Chinese Taipei	Jesmine Ho; Singapore	Huang Chiung-yao; Chinese Taipei

== Medal table ==
Rank	Nation	Gold	Silver	Bronze	Total
1	Chinese Taipei (TPE)	6	2	3	11
2	South Korea (KOR)	2	3	1	6
3	Thailand (THA)	1	4	0	5
4	Hong Kong (HKG)	1	0	0	1
5	Singapore (SIN)	0	1	1	2
6	Japan (JPN)	0	0	2	2
7	Malaysia (MAS)	0	0	1	1
7	Philippines (PHI)	0	0	1	1
7	United Arab Emirates (UAE)	0	0	1	1
Totals (9 entries)		10	10	10	30

== Participating nations ==
A total of 133 athletes from 17 nations competed in bowling at the 1998 Asian Games:

- Bahrain (6)
- China (6)
- Chinese Taipei (12)
- Hong Kong (5)
- Japan (12)
- Jordan (1)
- Kuwait (6)
- Macau (5)
- Malaysia (12)
- Mongolia (5)
- North Korea (3)
- Philippines (12)
- Qatar (6)
- Singapore (12)
- South Korea (12)
- Thailand (12)
- United Arab Emirates (6)
