= List of Asian Games medalists in bowling =

This is the complete list of Asian Games medalists in ten-pin bowling from 1978 to 2018.

== Men ==
=== Singles ===
Games	Gold	Silver	Bronze
1978 Bangkok	Masami Hirai (JPN)	Lee Sung-jin (KOR)	Wong Chin Wah (SIN)
1986 Seoul	Masami Hirai (JPN)	Rene Reyes (PHI)	Ringo Wang (MAL)
1994 Hiroshima	Lin Han-chen (TPE)	Hendro Pratono (INA)	Richard Phua (MAS)
1998 Bangkok	Wu Fu-lung (TPE)	Kritchawat Jampakao (THA)	Virgilio Sablan (PHI)
2002 Busan	Remy Ong (SIN)	Yannaphon Larpapharat (THA)	Shared silver
2002 Busan	Remy Ong (SIN)	Shaker Ali Al-Hassan (UAE)	Shared silver
2006 Doha	Ryan Leonard Lalisang (INA)	Choi Bok-eum (KOR)	Mahmood Al-Attar (UAE)
2010 Guangzhou	Biboy Rivera (PHI)	Mohammad Al-Regeebah (IOC)	Frederick Ong (PHI)
2014 Incheon	Yannaphon Larpapharat (THA)	Du Jianchao (CHN)	Sithiphol Kunaksorn (THA)

=== Doubles ===
Games	Gold	Silver	Bronze
1978 Bangkok	Japan (JPN); Masami Hirai; Kiyoshi Taneda	Hong Kong (HKG); Abdoul Akber; Francis Kam	Thailand (THA); Tave Vacharakasemsin; Pooh Nakeesatit
1986 Seoul	Japan (JPN); Kengo Tagata; Hiroshi Ishihara	Philippines (PHI); Delfin Garcia; Jorge Fernandez	Thailand (THA); Montri Setvipisinee; Surachai Kasemsiriroj
1994 Hiroshima	Japan (JPN); Kengo Tagata; Hiroshi Yamamoto	South Korea (KOR); Min Cheol-ki; Seo Kook	United Arab Emirates (UAE); Faraj Al-Marri; Mohammed Al-Qubaisi
1998 Bangkok	Chinese Taipei (TPE); Wang Yu-jen; Cheng Chao-yu	Thailand (THA); Prasert Panturat; Kritchawat Jampakao	South Korea (KOR); Kim Myung-jo; Park Young-su
2002 Busan	Philippines (PHI); Paeng Nepomuceno; R. J. Bautista	Japan (JPN); Isao Yamamoto; Seiji Watanabe	South Korea (KOR); Kim Myung-jo; Jo Nam-yi
2002 Busan	Philippines (PHI); Paeng Nepomuceno; R. J. Bautista	Japan (JPN); Isao Yamamoto; Seiji Watanabe	Chinese Taipei (TPE); Tsai Ting-yun; Chen Chih-wen
2006 Doha	Saudi Arabia (KSA); Hassan Al-Shaikh; Bader Al-Shaikh	Qatar (QAT); Abdulla Al-Qattan; Saeed Al-Hajri	Shared silver
2006 Doha	Saudi Arabia (KSA); Hassan Al-Shaikh; Bader Al-Shaikh	United Arab Emirates (UAE); Jamal Ali Mohammed; Nayef Eqab	Shared silver
2010 Guangzhou	Malaysia (MAS); Adrian Ang; Alex Liew	Japan (JPN); Tomokatsu Yamashita; Shogo Wada	Shared silver
2010 Guangzhou	Malaysia (MAS); Adrian Ang; Alex Liew	Singapore (SIN); Remy Ong; Jason Yeong-Nathan	Shared silver
2014 Incheon	Japan (JPN); Toshihiko Takahashi; Yoshinao Masatoki	Japan (JPN); Tomoyuki Sasaki; Daisuke Yoshida	Indonesia (INA); Billy Muhammad Islam; Hardy Rachmadian

=== Trios ===
Games	Gold	Silver	Bronze
1978 Bangkok	Thailand (THA); Samran Banyen; Kasem Minalai; Montri Setvipisinee	Japan (JPN); Masami Hirai; Toshihiro Takahashi; Kiyoshi Taneda	Philippines (PHI); Tito Sotto; Manny Sugatan; Jose Santos
1986 Seoul	Japan (JPN); Masami Hirai; Kengo Tagata; Hiroshi Ishihara	Singapore (SIN); Mike Wee; Jansen Chan; Ronnie Ng	Malaysia (MAL); Allan Lee; Stanley Tai; Edward Lim
1994 Hiroshima	Japan (JPN); Kengo Tagata; Hiroshi Yamamoto; Kosaku Tatemoto	South Korea (KOR); Min Cheol-ki; Seo Kook; Byun Ho-jin	United Arab Emirates (UAE); Faraj Al-Marri; Mohammed Al-Ghazal; Mohammed Al-Qubaisi
1998 Bangkok	Thailand (THA); Prasert Panturat; Kritchawat Jampakao; Seri Krausing	Chinese Taipei (TPE); Wang Yu-jen; Wu Fu-lung; Cheng Chao-yu	United Arab Emirates (UAE); Sultan Al-Marzouqi; Mohammed Al-Qubaisi; Hulaiman Al-Hameli
2002 Busan	Singapore (SIN); Sam Goh; Lee Yu Wen; Remy Ong	Philippines (PHI); Christian Jan Suarez; Chester King; Leonardo Rey	Shared silver
2002 Busan	Singapore (SIN); Sam Goh; Lee Yu Wen; Remy Ong	United Arab Emirates (UAE); Mohammed Al-Qubaisi; Shaker Ali Al-Hassan; Hulaiman Al-Hameli	Shared silver
2006 Doha	Malaysia (MAS); Daniel Lim; Ben Heng; Aaron Kong	Singapore (SIN); Lee Yu Wen; Jason Yeong-Nathan; Remy Ong	Saudi Arabia (KSA); Bader Al-Shaikh; Faisal Al-Juraifani; Hassan Al-Shaikh
2010 Guangzhou	South Korea (KOR); Choi Yong-kyu; Jang Dong-chul; Choi Bok-eum	South Korea (KOR); Suh Sang-cheon; Cho Young-seon; Hong Hae-sol	Qatar (QAT); Mansour Al-Awami; Mubarak Al-Merikhi; Fahad Al-Emadi
2014 Incheon	Japan (JPN); Tomoyuki Sasaki; Shogo Wada; Shusaku Asato	Malaysia (MAS); Syafiq Ridhwan; Timmy Tan; Zulmazran Zulkifli	South Korea (KOR); Kim Kyung-min; Park Jong-woo; Choi Bok-eum
2018 Jakarta–Palembang	Japan (JPN); Tomoyuki Sasaki; Shogo Wada; Shusaku Asato	Malaysia (MAS); Timmy Tan; Ahmad Muaz Fishol; Muhammad Rafiq Ismail	Singapore (SGP); Alex Chong; Darren Ong; Jaris Goh

=== Team ===
- Team of 5: 1978–2014
- Team of 6: 2018

Games	Gold	Silver	Bronze
1978 Bangkok	Malaysia (MAL); Alan Hooi; Khoo Boo Jin; Edward Lim; Holloway Cheah; P. S. Nathan; Lee Kok Hong	Thailand (THA); Samran Banyen; Kasem Minalai; Tawal Srisarakam; Montri Setvipisinee; Pooh Nakeesatit; Tave Vacharakasemsin	South Korea (KOR); Lee Sung-jin; Byun Chul; Kim Bum-joon; Kim Jung-sam; Ahn Byung-ku
1986 Seoul	Thailand (THA); Montri Setvipisinee; Sinchai Khluabkaew; Saravut Maneerat; Surachai Kasemsiriroj; Supote Peerasophon	Japan (JPN); Masami Hirai; Takashi Shino; Sasagu Tokashiki; Kengo Tagata; Hiroshi Ishihara; Kosaku Tatemoto	South Korea (KOR); Cho Kwang-myung; Byun Yong-hwan; Baek Hung-kee; Yoo Chung-hee; Suh Bom-sok; Huh Jung-chul
1994 Hiroshima	South Korea (KOR); Min Cheol-ki; Seo Kook; Lee Yun-jae; Byun Ho-jin; Kim Sung-joo; Lee Jae-ho	Philippines (PHI); Jorge Fernandez; Paeng Nepomuceno; Rene Reyes; Paulo Valdez; Angelo Constantino	Japan (JPN); Kengo Tagata; Hiroshi Yamamoto; Nobuyuki Takahama; Kosei Wada; Kosaku Tatemoto
1998 Bangkok	Chinese Taipei (TPE); Wang Yu-jen; Lin Han-chen; Wu Fu-lung; Chen Chun-fu; Cheng Chao-yu; Wang Tien-fu	South Korea (KOR); Choi Byung-jae; Byun Ho-jin; Seo Kook; Suh Bom-sok; Kim Myung-jo; Park Young-su	Japan (JPN); Masaru Ito; Osamu Hamada; Kengo Tagata; Shigeo Saito; Kosei Wada; Yoshio Koike
2002 Busan	Japan (JPN); Shigeo Saito; Isao Yamamoto; Seiji Watanabe; Masahiro Hibi; Hirofumi Morimoto; Masaru Ito	South Korea (KOR); Seo Kook; Byun Ho-jin; Kim Myung-jo; Kim Jae-hoon; Jo Nam-yi; Kim Kyung-min	Chinese Taipei (TPE); Kao Hai-yuan; Tsai Chun-lin; Tsai Ting-yun; Hsieh Yu-ping; Chen Chih-wen; Tsai Te-ko
2002 Busan	Japan (JPN); Shigeo Saito; Isao Yamamoto; Seiji Watanabe; Masahiro Hibi; Hirofumi Morimoto; Masaru Ito	South Korea (KOR); Seo Kook; Byun Ho-jin; Kim Myung-jo; Kim Jae-hoon; Jo Nam-yi; Kim Kyung-min	United Arab Emirates (UAE); Nayef Eqab; Mohammed Al-Qubaisi; Sultan Al-Marzouqi; Shaker Ali Al-Hassan; Hulaiman Al-Hameli; Sayed Ibrahim Al-Hashemi
2006 Doha	Japan (JPN); Toshihiko Takahashi; Masaaki Takemoto; Tomoyuki Sasaki; Tomokatsu Yamashita; Masaru Ito; Yoshinao Masatoki	South Korea (KOR); Choi Bok-eum; Joung Seoung-joo; Byun Ho-jin; Kang Hee-won; Jo Nam-yi; Park Sang-pil	Saudi Arabia (KSA); Hassan Al-Shaikh; Bader Al-Shaikh; Faisal Al-Juraifani; Ahmed Al-Hdyan; Yousif Akbar; Faisal Sugati
2010 Guangzhou	South Korea (KOR); Suh Sang-cheon; Choi Yong-kyu; Jang Dong-chul; Cho Young-seon; Choi Bok-eum; Hong Hae-sol	Malaysia (MAS); Adrian Ang; Aaron Kong; Alex Liew; Syafiq Ridhwan; Mohd Nur Aiman; Zulmazran Zulkifli	Hong Kong (HKG); Wu Siu Hong; Eric Tseng; Michael Mak; Wicky Yeung; Michael Tsang; Cyrus Cheung
2014 Incheon	South Korea (KOR); Park Jong-woo; Choi Bok-eum; Kim Kyung-min; Shin Seung-hyeon; Kang Hee-won; Hong Hae-sol	Malaysia (MAS); Syafiq Ridhwan; Adrian Ang; Timmy Tan; Zulmazran Zulkifli; Alex Liew; Muhammad Rafiq Ismail	Hong Kong (HKG); Wicky Yeung; Kam Siu Lun; Eric Tseng; Wu Siu Hong; Michael Mak; Chan Yat Long
2018 Jakarta–Palembang	South Korea (KOR); Choi Bok-eum; Hong Hae-sol; Park Jong-woo; Kim Jong-wook; Koo Seong-hoi; Kang Hee-won	Hong Kong (HKG); Ivan Tse; Lau Kwun Ho; Wong Kwan Yuen; Eric Tseng; Michael Mak; Wu Siu Hong	Chinese Taipei (TPE); Wu Hao-ming; Chen Hsin-an; Hung Kun-yi; Chen Ming-tang; Lin Pai-feng; Hsieh Chin-liang

=== All-events ===
Games	Gold	Silver	Bronze
1986 Seoul	Hiroshi Ishihara (JPN)	Ringo Wang (MAL)	Takashi Shino (JPN)
1994 Hiroshima	Kengo Tagata (JPN)	Mohammed Al-Qubaisi (UAE)	Min Cheol-ki (KOR)
2006 Doha	Bader Al-Shaikh (KSA)	Nayef Eqab (UAE)	Yannaphon Larpapharat (THA)
2010 Guangzhou	Alex Liew (MAS)	Choi Yong-kyu (KOR)	Choi Bok-eum (KOR)
2014 Incheon	Park Jong-woo (KOR)	Yannaphon Larpapharat (THA)	Kang Hee-won (KOR)

=== Masters ===
Games	Gold	Silver	Bronze
1978 Bangkok	Ahn Byung-ku (KOR)	Masami Hirai (JPN)	Samran Banyen (THA)
1986 Seoul	Byun Yong-hwan (KOR)	Takashi Shino (JPN)	Masami Hirai (JPN)
1994 Hiroshima	Hiroshi Yamamoto (JPN)	Tsai Chun-lin (TPE)	Saeed Al-Hajri (QAT)
1998 Bangkok	Hui Cheung Kwok (HKG)	Wu Fu-lung (TPE)	Lin Han-chen (TPE)
2002 Busan	Remy Ong (SIN)	Mubarak Al-Merikhi (QAT)	Ahmed Shahin Al-Merikhi (QAT)
2006 Doha	Jo Nam-yi (KOR)	Remy Ong (SIN)	Choi Bok-eum (KOR)
2010 Guangzhou	Choi Bok-eum (KOR)	Mohammad Al-Regeebah (IOC)	Du Jianchao (CHN)
2014 Incheon	Park Jong-woo (KOR)	Wu Siu Hong (HKG)	Shaker Ali Al-Hassan (UAE)
2018 Jakarta–Palembang	Muhammad Rafiq Ismail (MAS)	Park Jong-woo (KOR)	Koo Seong-hoi (KOR)

== Women ==
=== Singles ===
Games	Gold	Silver	Bronze
1978 Bangkok	Bong Coo (PHI)	Rosario de Leon (PHI)	Catherine Che (HKG)
1986 Seoul	Catherine Che (HKG)	Wannasiri Duangdee (THA)	Pannipa Sangtian (THA)
1994 Hiroshima	Kim Sook-young (KOR)	Noriko Inauchi (JPN)	Grace Young (SIN)
1998 Bangkok	Lee Ji-yeon (KOR)	Lee Mi-young (KOR)	Sarah Yap (MAS)
2002 Busan	Kim Soo-kyung (KOR)	Miyuki Kubotani (JPN)	Liza Clutario (PHI)
2006 Doha	Esther Cheah (MAS)	Putty Armein (INA)	Angkana Netrviseth (THA)
2010 Guangzhou	Hwang Sun-ok (KOR)	Shayna Ng (SIN)	New Hui Fen (SIN)
2014 Incheon	Chou Chia-chen (TPE)	Jazreel Tan (SIN)	Lee Na-young (KOR)

=== Doubles ===
Games	Gold	Silver	Bronze
1978 Bangkok	Thailand (THA); Tooh Daroonprasith; Anantita Hongsophon	Japan (JPN); Miyuki Motoi; Satomi Kiyofuji	Philippines (PHI); Lita dela Rosa; Nellie Castillo
1986 Seoul	Japan (JPN); Kumiko Inatsu; Yoshiko Ichiba	Japan (JPN); Atsuko Asai; Mayumi Hayashi	Philippines (PHI); Bong Coo; Arianne Cerdeña
1994 Hiroshima	South Korea (KOR); Kim Sook-young; Kim Young-sim	Malaysia (MAS); Lydia Kwah; Shirley Chow	Japan (JPN); Tomomi Shibata; Naoko Sekine
1998 Bangkok	South Korea (KOR); Lee Ji-yeon; Lee Mi-young	Thailand (THA); Butsaracum Poskrisana; Supaporn Chuanprasertkit	Chinese Taipei (TPE); Tseng Su-fen; Chou Miao-lin
2002 Busan	Malaysia (MAS); Sarah Yap; Wendy Chai	South Korea (KOR); Cha Mi-jung; Kim Soo-kyung	Chinese Taipei (TPE); Wang Yi-fen; Wang Yu-ling
2006 Doha	Singapore (SIN); Michelle Kwang; Valerie Teo	South Korea (KOR); Choi Jin-a; Kim Yeau-jin	Japan (JPN); Maki Nakano; Kanako Ishimine
2010 Guangzhou	South Korea (KOR); Choi Jin-a; Gang Hye-eun	South Korea (KOR); Hong Su-yeon; Son Yun-hee	China (CHN); Zhang Yuhong; Yang Suiling
2014 Incheon	South Korea (KOR); Lee Na-young; Son Yun-hee	Malaysia (MAS); Jane Sin; Shalin Zulkifli	South Korea (KOR); Lee Yeong-seung; Jung Da-wun

=== Trios ===
Games	Gold	Silver	Bronze
1978 Bangkok	Thailand (THA); Porntip Singha; Orawan Nithinawakorn; Anantita Hongsophon	Philippines (PHI); Bong Coo; Lolita Reformado; Lita dela Rosa	Hong Kong (HKG); Vivien Lau; Maria Chong; Catherine Che
1986 Seoul	Japan (JPN); Kumiko Inatsu; Kyoko Yamaguchi; Yoshiko Ichiba	Thailand (THA); Sudsomying Sukkasung; Wannasiri Duangdee; Anantita Hongsophon	Indonesia (INA); Sri Mulyani Ruzgar; Fenny Tjahjo; Charlotte Sjamsuddin
1994 Hiroshima	Malaysia (MAS); Lydia Kwah; Shirley Chow; Shalin Zulkifli	Japan (JPN); Atsuko Asai; Noriko Inauchi; Kumiko Inatsu	South Korea (KOR); Kim Sook-young; Kim Min-jung; Lee Ji-yeon
1998 Bangkok	Chinese Taipei (TPE); Tseng Su-fen; Chou Miao-lin; Kuo Shu-chen	Thailand (THA); Wannasiri Duangdee; Phetchara Kaewsuk; Supaporn Chuanprasertkit	Singapore (SIN); Jesmine Ho; Alice Tay; Grace Young
2002 Busan	South Korea (KOR); Cha Mi-jung; Kim Soo-kyung; Kim Yeau-jin	Chinese Taipei (TPE); Huang Chung-yao; Wang Yi-fen; Wang Yu-ling	Malaysia (MAS); Shalin Zulkifli; Sarah Yap; Wendy Chai
2006 Doha	South Korea (KOR); Kim Hyo-mi; Hwang Sun-ok; Nam Bo-ra	Malaysia (MAS); Esther Cheah; Zandra Aziela; Shalin Zulkifli	South Korea (KOR); Choi Jin-a; Gang Hye-eun; Kim Yeau-jin
2010 Guangzhou	Singapore (SIN); Cherie Tan; Geraldine Ng; Shayna Ng	South Korea (KOR); Choi Jin-a; Son Yun-hee; Hwang Sun-ok	China (CHN); Zhang Yuhong; Yang Suiling; Chen Dongdong
2014 Incheon	South Korea (KOR); Lee Na-young; Jung Da-wun; Son Yun-hee	Singapore (SIN); Cherie Tan; New Hui Fen; Jazreel Tan	South Korea (KOR); Lee Yeong-seung; Jeon Eun-hee; Kim Jin-sun
2018 Jakarta–Palembang	Malaysia (MAS); Esther Cheah; Siti Safiyah; Syaidatul Afifah	Chinese Taipei (TPE); Pan Yu-fen; Chou Chia-chen; Tsai Hsin-yi	Singapore (SGP); Joey Yeo; Daphne Tan; Bernice Lim

=== Team ===
- Team of 5: 1978–2014
- Team of 6: 2018

Games	Gold	Silver	Bronze
1978 Bangkok	Philippines (PHI); Lita dela Rosa; Rosario de Leon; Lolita Reformado; Nellie Castillo; Bong Coo	Thailand (THA); Benjaporn Thongsunsra; Porntip Singha; Orawan Nithinawakorn; Pranee Kitipongpithya; Anantita Hongsophon; Tooh Daroonprasith	South Korea (KOR); Chun Kyong-ok; Hong Bong-ok; Kim Byung-soon; Kim Chung-ja; Choi Jung-ja
1986 Seoul	Philippines (PHI); Bong Coo; Catalina Solis; Rebecca Watanabe; Arianne Cerdeña; Cecilia Gaffud	Japan (JPN); Kumiko Inatsu; Kyoko Yamaguchi; Atsuko Asai; Mayumi Hayashi; Yoshiko Ichiba; Yoshiko Sakamaru	South Korea (KOR); Lee Ji-yeon; Sun Yeon-suk; Lee Sang-jin; Kim Hee-sook; Yang Ae-suk; Choi Myung-ji
1994 Hiroshima	Chinese Taipei (TPE); Chen Ling-i; Weng Feng-ying; Chiu Shu-mei; Yang Lin-hua; Chou Miao-lin	Japan (JPN); Atsuko Asai; Noriko Inauchi; Tomomi Shibata; Naoko Sekine; Kumiko Inatsu	South Korea (KOR); Kim Sook-young; Kim Young-sim; Kim Min-jung; Kim Sung-hee; Lee Ji-yeon; Kim Min-soo
1998 Bangkok	Chinese Taipei (TPE); Chou Miao-lin; Wang Yu-ling; Tseng Su-fen; Huang Chiung-yao; Kuo Shu-chen; Ku Hui-chin	South Korea (KOR); Kim Yeau-jin; Kim Hee-soon; Lee Mi-young; Lee Ji-yeon; Kim Sook-young; Cha Mi-jung	Japan (JPN); Mari Kimura; Ayano Katai; Shima Washizuka; Tomomi Shibata; Tomie Kawaguchi; Nachimi Itakura
2002 Busan	South Korea (KOR); Kim Hee-soon; Cha Mi-jung; Kim Soo-kyung; Kim Yeau-jin; Kim Hyo-mi; Nam Bo-ra	Philippines (PHI); Liza del Rosario; Irene Garcia; Liza Clutario; Josephine Canare; Cecilia Yap; Kathleen Ann Lopez	Chinese Taipei (TPE); Chou Miao-lin; Huang Chung-yao; Wang Yi-fen; Wang Yu-ling; Huang Tsai-feng; Chu Yu-chieh
2006 Doha	Malaysia (MAS); Esther Cheah; Sharon Koh; Wendy Chai; Zandra Aziela; Shalin Zulkifli; Choy Poh Lai	South Korea (KOR); Choi Jin-a; Hwang Sun-ok; Gang Hye-eun; Kim Yeau-jin; Nam Bo-ra; Kim Hyo-mi	Singapore (SIN); Jennifer Tan; Cherie Tan; Evelyn Chan; Michelle Kwang; Valerie Teo; Sabrina Lim
2010 Guangzhou	South Korea (KOR); Choi Jin-a; Gang Hye-eun; Hong Su-yeon; Son Yun-hee; Hwang Sun-ok; Jeon Eun-hee	Indonesia (INA); Putty Armein; Ivana Hie; Novie Phang; Sharon Limansantoso; Tannya Roumimper; Shalima Zalsha	Malaysia (MAS); Esther Cheah; Sharon Koh; Zatil Iman; Shalin Zulkifli; Zandra Aziela; Jane Sin
2014 Incheon	Singapore (SIN); Cherie Tan; Daphne Tan; Shayna Ng; New Hui Fen; Jazreel Tan; Joey Yeo	South Korea (KOR); Lee Na-young; Jung Da-wun; Kim Jin-sun; Son Yun-hee; Jeon Eun-hee; Lee Yeong-seung	Indonesia (INA); Tannya Roumimper; Novie Phang; Alisha Nabila Larasati; Sharon Limansantoso; Putty Armein; Cheya Chantika
2018 Jakarta–Palembang	South Korea (KOR); Baek Seung-ja; Han Byul; Kim Hyun-mi; Lee Yeon-ji; Ryu Seo-yeon; Lee Na-young	Malaysia (MAS); Esther Cheah; Syaidatul Afifah; Natasha Roslan; Jane Sin; Siti Safiyah; Shalin Zulkifli	Chinese Taipei (TPE); Chang Yu-hsuan; Pan Yu-fen; Chou Chia-chen; Tsai Hsin-yi; Huang Chiung-yao; Wang Ya-ting

=== All-events ===
Games	Gold	Silver	Bronze
1986 Seoul	Bong Coo (PHI)	Mayumi Hayashi (JPN)	Poppy Marijke Tambis (INA)
1994 Hiroshima	Shalin Zulkifli (MAS)	Kim Sook-young (KOR)	Lydia Kwah (MAS)
2006 Doha	Choi Jin-a (KOR)	Esther Cheah (MAS)	Valerie Teo (SIN)
2010 Guangzhou	Hwang Sun-ok (KOR)	Choi Jin-a (KOR)	Zhang Yuhong (CHN)
2014 Incheon	Lee Na-young (KOR)	Jane Sin (MAS)	Jazreel Tan (SIN)

=== Masters ===
Games	Gold	Silver	Bronze
1978 Bangkok	Bong Coo (PHI)	Rosario de Leon (PHI)	Anantita Hongsophon (THA)
1986 Seoul	Lee Ji-yeon (KOR)	Catherine Che (HKG)	Catalina Solis (PHI)
1994 Hiroshima	Lee Ji-yeon (KOR)	Kim Sook-young (KOR)	Irene Garcia (PHI)
1998 Bangkok	Chou Miao-lin (TPE)	Jesmine Ho (SIN)	Huang Chiung-yao (TPE)
2002 Busan	Shalin Zulkifli (MAS)	Lai Kin Ngoh (MAS)	Kim Hyo-mi (KOR)
2006 Doha	Choi Jin-a (KOR)	Esther Cheah (MAS)	Kim Yeau-jin (KOR)
2010 Guangzhou	Hwang Sun-ok (KOR)	Cherie Tan (SIN)	Choi Jin-a (KOR)
2014 Incheon	Lee Na-young (KOR)	Wang Ya-ting (TPE)	Son Yun-hee (KOR)
2018 Jakarta–Palembang	Mirai Ishimoto (JPN)	Lee Yeon-ji (KOR)	Lee Na-young (KOR)
