= Bowling at the 1998 Asian Games – Men's trios =

Bowling competition in Asian Games in 1998

Men's trios at the 1998 Asian Games
- Venue: P.S. Bowling Bangkapi
- Date: 11–12 December 1998
- Competitors: 81 from 15 nations

Medalists
gold medal	Thailand; Prasert Panturat, Kritchawat Jampakao, Seri Krausing
silver medal	Chinese Taipei; Wang Yu-jen, Wu Fu-lung, Cheng Chao-yu
bronze medal	United Arab Emirates; Sultan Al-Marzouqi, Mohammed Al-Qubaisi, Hulaiman Al-Hameli

The men's trios competition at the 1998 Asian Games in Bangkok was held on 11 and 12 December 1998 at P.S. Bowling.

== Schedule ==
All times are Indochina Time (UTC+07:00)

Date	Time	Event
Friday, 11 December 1998	09:00	1st block
Saturday, 12 December 1998	16:00	2nd block

== Results ==
Rank	Team	Score
1st place, gold medalist(s)	Thailand (THA); Prasert Panturat; Kritchawat Jampakao; Seri Krausing	3760
2nd place, silver medalist(s)	Chinese Taipei (TPE); Wang Yu-jen; Wu Fu-lung; Cheng Chao-yu	3696
3rd place, bronze medalist(s)	United Arab Emirates (UAE); Sultan Al-Marzouqi; Mohammed Al-Qubaisi; Hulaiman Al-Hameli	3690
4	Chinese Taipei (TPE); Chen Chun-fu; Lin Han-chen; Wang Tien-fu	3684
5	Singapore (SIN); Tommy Ong; Jack Wong; Tan Yong Seng	3642
6	Philippines (PHI); Paeng Nepomuceno; Paulo Valdez; Virgilio Sablan	3633
7	South Korea (KOR); Park Young-su; Suh Bom-sok; Choi Byung-jae	3617
8	Singapore (SIN); Jeremy Fang; Adam Chew; Rick Tan	3603
9	Japan (JPN); Masaru Ito; Kengo Tagata; Shigeo Saito	3595
10	China (CHN); Zhao Dongshan; Zhang Zhiliang; Lu Hengchuan	3593
11	Qatar (QAT); Khalifa Al-Kubaisi; Salem Al-Mansoori; Bandar Al-Shafi	3590
12	United Arab Emirates (UAE); Ibrahim Al-Shamsi; Shaker Ali Al-Hassan; Khalifa Al-Nuami	3564
13	Philippines (PHI); George Fernandez; Biboy Rivera; Ernesto Gatchalian	3545
14	Malaysia (MAS); Lai Chuen Lian; Alex Liew; Kenny Ang	3509
15	South Korea (KOR); Byun Ho-jin; Seo Kook; Kim Myung-jo	3500
16	China (CHN); Sha Mingjian; Zhao Jun; Xiong Guoliang	3488
17	Thailand (THA); Pasagorn Kongkarrat; Siriphon Mayura; Bunsong Numthuam	3482
18	Bahrain (BRN); Adel Qudrat Rasti; Mohamed Sharif; Mohamed Al-Shawoosh	3464
19	Kuwait (KUW); Sabah Mesbeh; Fadhel Al-Mousawi; Mohammad Abbas	3457
20	Malaysia (MAS); Vincent Low; Ben Heng; Daniel Lim	3437
21	Qatar (QAT); Saeed Al-Hajri; Ahmed Shahin Al-Merikhi; Khalifa Khaled	3410
22	Japan (JPN); Yoshio Koike; Kosei Wada; Osamu Hamada	3386
23	Hong Kong (HKG); Chung Him; Alfred Pang; Chiang Kwok Fai	3378
24	Kuwait (KUW); Abduljalil Ali; Nouri Al-Ameeri; Ayad Al-Amiri	3357
25	Macau (MAC); Wong Chi Kuong; Jose Manuel Machon; Luis Miguel Machado	3303
26	Bahrain (BRN); Mahdi Asadallah; Abdulhamed Asadallah; Masoud Rasti	3292
27	Mongolia (MGL); Enkhbayaryn Enkhbold; J. Enkhsaikhan; Vandangiin Erdenebayar	2691
