= Bowling at the 1998 Asian Games – Men's singles =

Men's singles at the 1998 Asian Games
- Venue: P.S. Bowling Bangkapi
- Date: 9 December 1998
- Competitors: 85 from 16 nations

Medalists
gold medal	Wu Fu-lung	Chinese Taipei
silver medal	Kritchawat Jampakao	Thailand
bronze medal	Virgilio Sablan	Philippines

The men's singles competition at the 1998 Asian Games in Bangkok was held on 9 December 1998 at P.S. Bowling.

== Schedule ==
All times are Indochina Time (UTC+07:00)

Date	Time	Event
Wednesday, 9 December 1998	09:00	1st squad
Wednesday, 9 December 1998	12:00	2nd squad

== Results ==
Rank	Athlete	Score
1st place, gold medalist(s)	Wu Fu-lung (TPE)	1393
2nd place, silver medalist(s)	Kritchawat Jampakao (THA)	1368
3rd place, bronze medalist(s)	Virgilio Sablan (PHI)	1363
4	Prasert Panturat (THA)	1362
5	Seo Kook (KOR)	1347
6	Kengo Tagata (JPN)	1341
6	Byun Ho-jin (KOR)	1341
8	Paulo Valdez (PHI)	1331
9	Cheng Chao-yu (TPE)	1320
10	Lu Hengchuan (CHN)	1317
11	Lin Han-chen (TPE)	1308
12	Vincent Low (MAS)	1295
13	Wang Yu-jen (TPE)	1282
14	Kim Myung-jo (KOR)	1267
14	Jeremy Fang (SIN)	1267
16	Tommy Ong (SIN)	1259
16	Paeng Nepomuceno (PHI)	1259
18	Ahmed Shahin Al-Merikhi (QAT)	1243
19	Mohamed Al-Shawoosh (BRN)	1242
20	Lai Chuen Lian (MAS)	1237
21	Ernesto Gatchalian (PHI)	1229
22	Fadhel Al-Mousawi (KUW)	1226
23	Ibrahim Al-Shamsi (UAE)	1224
23	Kenny Ang (MAS)	1224
25	Tan Yong Seng (SIN)	1221
26	Zhao Dongshan (CHN)	1220
27	Daniel Lim (MAS)	1213
27	Chen Chun-fu (TPE)	1213
29	Park Young-su (KOR)	1210
30	Shigeo Saito (JPN)	1206
31	Mohammad Abbas (KUW)	1205
32	Biboy Rivera (PHI)	1202
33	Siriphon Mayura (THA)	1200
34	Masaru Ito (JPN)	1199
35	Sultan Al-Marzouqi (UAE)	1196
36	Zhang Zhiliang (CHN)	1193
37	Hui Cheung Kwok (HKG)	1192
38	Chui Po Chung (HKG)	1191
38	Wang Tien-fu (TPE)	1191
40	Mohamed Sharif (BRN)	1190
41	Adel Qudrat Rasti (BRN)	1189
42	Suh Bom-sok (KOR)	1186
43	Chung Him (HKG)	1175
44	Bandar Al-Shafi (QAT)	1174
45	Khalifa Khaled (QAT)	1171
46	Seri Krausing (THA)	1170
47	Mohammed Al-Qubaisi (UAE)	1166
48	Pasagorn Kongkarrat (THA)	1165
49	Yoshio Koike (JPN)	1156
50	Chiang Kwok Fai (HKG)	1155
51	Jose Manuel Machon (MAC)	1154
51	Alex Liew (MAS)	1154
53	Salem Al-Mansoori (QAT)	1152
54	Hulaiman Al-Hameli (UAE)	1151
55	George Fernandez (PHI)	1149
56	Saeed Al-Hajri (QAT)	1148
57	Jack Wong (SIN)	1147
58	Shaker Ali Al-Hassan (UAE)	1146
59	Rick Tan (SIN)	1144
60	Sabah Mesbeh (KUW)	1141
60	Ayad Al-Amiri (KUW)	1141
62	Alfred Pang (HKG)	1134
63	Masoud Rasti (BRN)	1129
64	Ben Heng (MAS)	1128
65	Adam Chew (SIN)	1125
66	Luis Miguel Machado (MAC)	1124
67	Choi Byung-jae (KOR)	1120
68	Osamu Hamada (JPN)	1118
69	Mahdi Asadallah (BRN)	1110
70	Abduljalil Ali (KUW)	1102
71	Wong Chi Kuong (MAC)	1094
72	Kosei Wada (JPN)	1090
73	Khalifa Al-Kubaisi (QAT)	1089
74	Nouri Al-Ameeri (KUW)	1087
75	Xiong Guoliang (CHN)	1086
76	Khalifa Al-Nuami (UAE)	1085
77	Abdulhamed Asadallah (BRN)	1084
77	Bunsong Numthuam (THA)	1084
79	Sha Mingjian (CHN)	1077
80	Enkhbayaryn Enkhbold (MGL)	985
81	Zhao Jun (CHN)	975
82	Vandangiin Erdenebayar (MGL)	974
83	Mohammad Al-Masri (JOR)	965
84	Mönkhgereliin Samdan (MGL)	947
85	J. Enkhsaikhan (MGL)	866
