= Bowling at the 1998 Asian Games – Men's doubles =

Men's doubles at the 1998 Asian Games
- Venue: P.S. Bowling Bangkapi
- Date: 10 December 1998
- Competitors: 82 from 15 nations

Medalists
gold medal	Wang Yu-jen; Cheng Chao-yu	Chinese Taipei
silver medal	Prasert Panturat; Kritchawat Jampakao	Thailand
bronze medal	Kim Myung-jo; Park Young-su	South Korea

The men's doubles competition at the 1998 Asian Games in Bangkok was held on 10 December 1998 at P.S. Bowling.

== Schedule ==
All times are Indochina Time (UTC+07:00)

Date	Time	Event
Thursday, 10 December 1998	09:00	1st squad
Thursday, 10 December 1998	12:00	2nd squad

== Results ==
Rank	Team	Score
1st place, gold medalist(s)	Chinese Taipei (TPE); Wang Yu-jen; Cheng Chao-yu	2660
2nd place, silver medalist(s)	Thailand (THA); Prasert Panturat; Kritchawat Jampakao	2652
3rd place, bronze medalist(s)	South Korea (KOR); Kim Myung-jo; Park Young-su	2633
4	Hong Kong (HKG); Chui Po Chung; Alfred Pang	2590
5	Singapore (SIN); Adam Chew; Jack Wong	2587
6	Japan (JPN); Yoshio Koike; Kengo Tagata	2537
7	Philippines (PHI); Paulo Valdez; Virgilio Sablan	2530
8	Chinese Taipei (TPE); Lin Han-chen; Wu Fu-lung	2487
9	China (CHN); Zhao Dongshan; Lu Hengchuan	2483
10	Japan (JPN); Masaru Ito; Osamu Hamada	2467
11	Qatar (QAT); Saeed Al-Hajri; Ahmed Shahin Al-Merikhi	2445
12	Singapore (SIN); Tan Yong Seng; Tommy Ong	2432
13	Japan (JPN); Shigeo Saito; Kosei Wada	2414
13	Chinese Taipei (TPE); Chen Chun-fu; Wang Tien-fu	2414
15	Singapore (SIN); Jeremy Fang; Rick Tan	2406
16	Qatar (QAT); Bandar Al-Shafi; Salem Al-Mansoori	2397
17	South Korea (KOR); Byun Ho-jin; Seo Kook	2393
18	Malaysia (MAS); Lai Chuen Lian; Kenny Ang	2391
19	South Korea (KOR); Choi Byung-jae; Suh Bom-sok	2382
20	Malaysia (MAS); Daniel Lim; Ben Heng	2381
20	United Arab Emirates (UAE); Sultan Al-Marzouqi; Ibrahim Al-Shamsi	2381
22	Malaysia (MAS); Vincent Low; Alex Liew	2370
23	Hong Kong (HKG); Hui Cheung Kwok; Chung Him	2367
24	Thailand (THA); Pasagorn Kongkarrat; Siriphon Mayura	2362
25	Bahrain (BRN); Mahdi Asadallah; Mohamed Al-Shawoosh	2321
26	Kuwait (KUW); Fadhel Al-Mousawi; Abduljalil Ali	2313
27	Philippines (PHI); Ernesto Gatchalian; George Fernandez	2298
27	United Arab Emirates (UAE); Hulaiman Al-Hameli; Mohammed Al-Qubaisi	2298
29	Kuwait (KUW); Nouri Al-Ameeri; Sabah Mesbeh	2283
29	Qatar (QAT); Khalifa Khaled; Khalifa Al-Kubaisi	2283
31	Bahrain (BRN); Masoud Rasti; Abdulhamed Asadallah	2278
32	Macau (MAC); Wong Chi Kuong; Jose Manuel Machon	2276
32	Philippines (PHI); Paeng Nepomuceno; Biboy Rivera	2276
34	Bahrain (BRN); Mohamed Sharif; Adel Qudrat Rasti	2264
35	Thailand (THA); Seri Krausing; Bunsong Numthuam	2255
36	Kuwait (KUW); Mohammad Abbas; Ayad Al-Amiri	2237
37	China (CHN); Zhang Zhiliang; Zhao Jun	2232
38	China (CHN); Sha Mingjian; Xiong Guoliang	2180
39	United Arab Emirates (UAE); Shaker Ali Al-Hassan; Khalifa Al-Nuami	2128
40	Mongolia (MGL); Vandangiin Erdenebayar; Enkhbayaryn Enkhbold	1927
41	Mongolia (MGL); Mönkhgereliin Samdan; J. Enkhsaikhan	1880
