= Bowling at the 1998 Asian Games – Men's team =

Men's team of 5 at the 1998 Asian Games
- Venue: P.S. Bowling Bangkapi
- Date: 11–12 December 1998
- Competitors: 77 from 13 nations

Medalists
gold medal	Chinese Taipei; Wang Yu-jen, Lin Han-chen, Wu Fu-lung, Chen Chun-fu, Cheng Chao-yu, Wang Tien-fu
silver medal	South Korea; Choi Byung-jae, Byun Ho-jin, Seo Kook, Suh Bom-sok, Kim Myung-jo, Park Young-su
bronze medal	Japan; Masaru Ito, Osamu Hamada, Kengo Tagata, Shigeo Saito, Kosei Wada, Yoshio Koike

The men's team of five competition at the 1998 Asian Games in Bangkok was held on 11 and 12 December 1998 at P.S. Bowling.

== Schedule ==
All times are Indochina Time (UTC+07:00)

Date	Time	Event
Friday, 11 December 1998	16:00	1st block
Saturday, 12 December 1998	09:00	2nd block

== Results ==
Rank	Team	Score
1st place, gold medalist(s)	Chinese Taipei (TPE); Wang Yu-jen; Lin Han-chen; Wu Fu-lung; Chen Chun-fu; Cheng Chao-yu; Wang Tien-fu	6073
2nd place, silver medalist(s)	South Korea (KOR); Choi Byung-jae; Byun Ho-jin; Seo Kook; Suh Bom-sok; Kim Myung-jo; Park Young-su	6045
3rd place, bronze medalist(s)	Japan (JPN); Masaru Ito; Osamu Hamada; Kengo Tagata; Shigeo Saito; Kosei Wada; Yoshio Koike	5972
4	China (CHN); Sha Mingjian; Zhao Dongshan; Zhao Jun; Zhang Zhiliang; Xiong Guoliang; Lu Hengchuan	5926
5	Qatar (QAT); Saeed Al-Hajri; Khalifa Al-Kubaisi; Ahmed Shahin Al-Merikhi; Salem Al-Mansoori; Khalifa Khaled; Bandar Al-Shafi	5908
6	United Arab Emirates (UAE); Khalifa Al-Nuami; Sultan Al-Marzouqi; Mohammed Al-Qubaisi; Shaker Ali Al-Hassan; Ibrahim Al-Shamsi; Hulaiman Al-Hameli	5862
7	Thailand (THA); Prasert Panturat; Pasagorn Kongkarrat; Kritchawat Jampakao; Bunsong Numthuam; Seri Krausing; Siriphon Mayura	5852
8	Singapore (SIN); Tommy Ong; Jack Wong; Adam Chew; Rick Tan; Tan Yong Seng; Jeremy Fang	5834
9	Bahrain (BRN); Adel Qudrat Rasti; Abdulhamed Asadallah; Mohamed Sharif; Mohamed Al-Shawoosh; Mahdi Asadallah; Masoud Rasti	5802
10	Malaysia (MAS); Vincent Low; Daniel Lim; Alex Liew; Ben Heng; Lai Chuen Lian; Kenny Ang	5799
11	Kuwait (KUW); Sabah Mesbeh; Nouri Al-Ameeri; Fadhel Al-Mousawi; Mohammad Abbas; Abduljalil Ali; Ayad Al-Amiri	5757
12	Hong Kong (HKG); Hui Cheung Kwok; Alfred Pang; Chung Him; Chiang Kwok Fai; Chui Po Chung	5731
13	Philippines (PHI); Paeng Nepomuceno; Ernesto Gatchalian; Paulo Valdez; Virgilio Sablan; Biboy Rivera; George Fernandez	5564
