= Bowling at the 2002 Asian Games – Men's doubles =

Men's doubles at the 2002 Asian Games
- Venue: Homeplus Asiad Bowling Alley
- Date: 4 October 2002
- Competitors: 96 from 17 nations

Medalists
gold medal	Paeng Nepomuceno; R. J. Bautista	Philippines
silver medal	Isao Yamamoto; Seiji Watanabe	Japan
bronze medal	Kim Myung-jo; Jo Nam-yi	South Korea
bronze medal	Tsai Ting-yun; Chen Chih-wen	Chinese Taipei

The men's doubles competition at the 2002 Asian Games in Busan was held on 4 October 2002 at the Homeplus Asiad Bowling Alley.

== Schedule ==
All times are Korea Standard Time (UTC+09:00)

Date	Time	Event
Friday, 4 October 2002	13:30	Squad A
Friday, 4 October 2002	18:00	Squad B

== Results ==
Rank	Team	Game						Total
Rank	Team	1	2	3	4	5	6	Total
1st place, gold medalist(s)	Philippines 1 (PHI)	445	504	419	489	426	431	2714
	Paeng Nepomuceno	218	279	248	213	195	205	1358
	R. J. Bautista	227	225	171	276	231	226	1356
2nd place, silver medalist(s)	Japan 1 (JPN)	408	477	403	461	458	463	2670
	Isao Yamamoto	213	265	206	237	236	229	1386
	Seiji Watanabe	195	212	197	224	222	234	1284
3rd place, bronze medalist(s)	South Korea 2 (KOR)	404	423	446	441	447	502	2663
	Kim Myung-jo	199	197	240	203	198	279	1316
	Jo Nam-yi	205	226	206	238	249	223	1347
3rd place, bronze medalist(s)	Chinese Taipei 3 (TPE)	418	480	496	446	425	398	2663
	Tsai Ting-yun	212	258	268	221	246	191	1396
	Chen Chih-wen	206	222	228	225	179	207	1267
5	Singapore 3 (SIN)	480	478	470	384	446	403	2661
	Lee Yu Wen	224	211	222	203	246	169	1275
	Remy Ong	256	267	248	181	200	234	1386
6	Hong Kong 2 (HKG)	425	443	480	432	426	432	2638
	Hui Cheung Kwok	236	223	236	208	213	216	1332
	Chung Him	189	220	244	224	213	216	1306
7	Philippines 3 (PHI)	374	430	426	440	520	425	2615
	Biboy Rivera	193	186	229	238	265	189	1300
	Chester King	181	244	197	202	255	236	1315
8	United Arab Emirates 1 (UAE)	405	377	443	454	463	444	2586
	Mohammed Al-Qubaisi	204	174	193	216	199	218	1204
	Shaker Ali Al-Hassan	201	203	250	238	264	226	1382
9	Qatar 3 (QAT)	393	435	370	452	469	456	2575
	Mubarak Al-Merikhi	182	256	202	238	245	258	1381
	Khalifa Al-Kubaisi	211	179	168	214	224	198	1194
10	China 1 (CHN)	411	514	379	396	453	411	2564
	Sha Mingjian	238	256	190	201	195	228	1308
	Zhang Ye	173	258	189	195	258	183	1256
11	South Korea 1 (KOR)	436	431	438	471	370	417	2563
	Kim Jae-hoon	235	209	206	247	173	181	1251
	Kim Kyung-min	201	222	232	224	197	236	1312
12	Japan 3 (JPN)	409	407	459	436	423	412	2546
	Shigeo Saito	183	215	235	181	230	216	1260
	Masaru Ito	226	192	224	255	193	196	1286
13	Chinese Taipei 1 (TPE)	400	419	407	412	415	479	2532
	Hsieh Yu-ping	216	247	205	211	203	212	1294
	Tsai Te-ko	184	172	202	201	212	267	1238
14	United Arab Emirates 2 (UAE)	352	423	474	444	419	406	2518
	Nayef Eqab	152	220	269	200	220	179	1240
	Hulaiman Al-Hameli	200	203	205	244	199	227	1278
15	Japan 2 (JPN)	373	416	405	453	449	421	2517
	Masahiro Hibi	195	190	225	247	279	208	1344
	Hirofumi Morimoto	178	226	180	206	170	213	1173
16	Malaysia 2 (MAS)	395	425	401	471	442	378	2512
	Alex Liew	207	215	211	267	253	213	1366
	Gerald Samuel	188	210	190	204	189	165	1146
17	Chinese Taipei 2 (TPE)	429	416	406	401	398	460	2510
	Kao Hai-yuan	238	216	189	206	205	213	1267
	Tsai Chun-lin	191	200	217	195	193	247	1243
18	Thailand 1 (THA)	434	421	455	419	388	390	2507
	Chawasit Phasukthaworn	207	201	213	235	191	181	1228
	Pachon Nilta	227	220	242	184	197	209	1279
19	Malaysia 3 (MAS)	453	413	403	403	375	451	2498
	Zulmazran Zulkifli	217	200	219	183	192	259	1270
	Ben Heng	236	213	184	220	183	192	1228
20	Singapore 2 (SIN)	452	486	381	401	391	378	2489
	Alvin Kwang	218	253	169	170	197	201	1208
	Sam Goh	234	233	212	231	194	177	1281
21	Kuwait 3 (KUW)	406	470	441	363	414	381	2475
	Fadhel Al-Mousawi	197	223	219	177	187	181	1184
	Basel Al-Anzi	209	247	222	186	227	200	1291
22	China 2 (CHN)	464	344	458	425	382	385	2458
	Liu Shaoyi	242	169	213	202	214	192	1232
	Sun Huaqiang	222	175	245	223	168	193	1226
23	Qatar 2 (QAT)	398	368	412	383	426	470	2457
	Saeed Al-Hajri	184	181	164	199	172	238	1138
	Ahmed Shahin Al-Merikhi	214	187	248	184	254	232	1319
24	Thailand 2 (THA)	410	416	384	418	434	389	2451
	Yannaphon Larpapharat	221	213	185	247	234	223	1323
	Bunsong Numthuam	189	203	199	171	200	166	1128
25	Philippines 2 (PHI)	377	427	412	438	386	400	2440
	Christian Jan Suarez	182	200	227	222	183	190	1204
	Leonardo Rey	195	227	185	216	203	210	1236
26	Bahrain 3 (BRN)	393	392	372	385	459	437	2438
	Yusuf Mohamed Falah	177	184	186	198	255	211	1211
	Osama Khalfan	216	208	186	187	204	226	1227
26	Kuwait 2 (KUW)	441	400	380	378	417	422	2438
	Saleh Al-Jahjouh	192	217	177	190	207	203	1186
	Yaqeb Al-Shatei	249	183	203	188	210	219	1252
28	South Korea 3 (KOR)	415	399	361	407	418	427	2427
	Seo Kook	205	221	169	219	192	199	1205
	Byun Ho-jin	210	178	192	188	226	228	1222
29	Saudi Arabia 1 (KSA)	397	350	392	423	427	434	2423
	Talal Al-Towireb	212	147	168	187	213	232	1159
	Mohammed Al-Najrani	185	203	224	236	214	202	1264
30	Kuwait 1 (KUW)	441	403	351	385	414	417	2411
	Nader Nazar	246	222	191	182	224	268	1333
	Tariq Al-Hajeri	195	181	160	203	190	149	1078
31	Saudi Arabia 2 (KSA)	393	411	441	394	328	428	2395
	Tammam Sharif	180	242	234	212	145	225	1238
	Abidah Al-Bargi	213	169	207	182	183	203	1157
32	Hong Kong 3 (HKG)	323	363	383	457	412	436	2374
	Norman Law	145	192	156	212	210	245	1160
	Rocky Hui	178	171	227	245	202	191	1214
33	China 3 (CHN)	386	370	358	417	429	392	2352
	Li Zhibin	207	190	168	207	193	184	1149
	Jiang Yong	179	180	190	210	236	208	1203
34	Hong Kong 1 (HKG)	389	375	414	376	393	398	2345
	Eric Lau	202	196	199	182	179	196	1154
	Wu Siu Hong	187	179	215	194	214	202	1191
35	Malaysia 1 (MAS)	355	421	362	365	414	426	2343
	Azidi Ameran	166	201	199	199	202	247	1214
	Daniel Lim	189	220	163	166	212	179	1129
36	Kazakhstan 2 (KAZ)	411	385	382	344	402	407	2331
	Galymzhan Tashimov	212	208	177	182	200	214	1193
	Dulat Turlykhanov	199	177	205	162	202	193	1138
37	Kazakhstan 1 (KAZ)	436	364	387	332	347	450	2316
	Marat Turlykhanov	224	163	178	163	157	193	1078
	Kairat Baibolatov	212	201	209	169	190	257	1238
38	Singapore 1 (SIN)	332	342	408	460	397	340	2279
	Dominic Lim	182	166	189	246	202	182	1167
	Carl de Vries	150	176	219	214	195	158	1112
39	Macau 2 (MAC)	400	337	383	375	364	418	2277
	Sou Wai Chon	198	180	203	179	157	201	1118
	Choi Iao Man	202	157	180	196	207	217	1159
40	Qatar 1 (QAT)	380	353	419	376	339	386	2253
	Khalifa Al-Khalifa	192	213	216	211	180	224	1236
	Abdulla Al-Qattan	188	140	203	165	159	162	1017
41	Saudi Arabia 3 (KSA)	367	350	435	402	352	332	2238
	Meshal Handi	180	144	225	204	142	154	1049
	Bassam Ghonaim	187	206	210	198	210	178	1189
42	Macau 1 (MAC)	351	350	371	382	369	364	2187
	Jose Manuel Machon	193	185	170	233	203	191	1175
	Choi Io Fai	158	165	201	149	166	173	1012
43	United Arab Emirates 3 (UAE)	358	365	348	388	391	326	2176
	Sultan Al-Marzouqi	188	175	191	226	181	180	1141
	Sayed Ibrahim Al-Hashemi	170	190	157	162	210	146	1035
44	Bahrain 2 (BRN)	372	366	401	345	358	316	2158
	Ahmed Al-Awadhi	170	190	211	188	194	177	1130
	Mahdi Asadalla	202	176	190	157	164	139	1028
45	Bahrain 1 (BRN)	376	366	332	354	349	374	2151
	Khalid Al-Khaja	220	173	152	185	172	169	1071
	Ayoob Hassan	156	193	180	169	177	205	1080
46	Mongolia 1 (MGL)	380	324	283	313	452	363	2115
	Gendenjamtsyn Badamsambuu	176	169	138	140	196	161	980
	Tsend-Ochiryn Bolor-Erdene	204	155	145	173	256	202	1135
47	Mongolia 2 (MGL)	298	356	341	356	358	367	2076
	Miyegombyn Tüvshinsanaa	144	198	140	208	176	165	1031
	Adilbishiin Baatarbold	154	158	201	148	182	202	1045
48	Mongolia 3 (MGL)	303	319	315	333	281	349	1900
	Tulgyn Altangerel	124	179	147	109	130	177	866
	Galbadrakhyn Sunduijav	179	140	168	224	151	172	1034
Individuals
	Shaik Abdul Hameed (IND)	183	180	198	224	222	215	1222
	Abdrakhman Abinayev (KAZ)	159	168	144	214	156	167	1008
	Andre Souza (MAC)	151	147	149	159	164	153	923
	Terdporn Manophaiboon (THA)	182	239	174	215	191	191	1192
