= Bowling at the 2002 Asian Games – Men's team =

Men's team of 5 at the 2002 Asian Games
- Venue: Homeplus Asiad Bowling Alley
- Date: 5–7 October 2002
- Competitors: 97 from 17 nations

Medalists
gold medal	Japan; Shigeo Saito, Isao Yamamoto, Seiji Watanabe, Masahiro Hibi, Hirofumi Morimoto, Masaru Ito
silver medal	South Korea; Seo Kook, Byun Ho-jin, Kim Myung-jo, Kim Jae-hoon, Jo Nam-yi, Kim Kyung-min
bronze medal	Chinese Taipei; Kao Hai-yuan, Tsai Chun-lin, Tsai Ting-yun, Hsieh Yu-ping, Chen Chih-wen, Tsai Te-ko
bronze medal	United Arab Emirates; Nayef Eqab, Mohammed Al-Qubaisi, Sultan Al-Marzouqi, Shaker Ali Al-Hassan, Hulaiman Al-Hameli, Sayed Ibrahim Al-Hashemi

The men's team of five competition at the 2002 Asian Games in Busan was held on 5 and 7 October 2002 at the Homeplus Asiad Bowling Alley.

== Schedule ==
All times are Korea Standard Time (UTC+09:00)

Date	Time	Event
Saturday, 5 October 2002	17:20	First block
Monday, 7 October 2002	09:00	Second block

== Results ==
Rank	Team	Game						Total
Rank	Team	1	2	3	4	5	6	Total
1st place, gold medalist(s)	Japan (JPN)	1051	1055	1055	1045	1101	1082	6389
	Shigeo Saito	213	199	224	222	234	202	1294
	Isao Yamamoto	224	201	205	204	193	213	1240
	Seiji Watanabe	215	203	235	190	216	245	1304
	Masahiro Hibi	199	226	185	202	273	214	1299
	Hirofumi Morimoto	200	226	206	227	185	208	1252
2nd place, silver medalist(s)	South Korea (KOR)	925	1052	1098	1057	1137	1004	6273
	Seo Kook	181	189	174	215	212	260	1231
	Byun Ho-jin	180	244	193	210	243	188	1258
	Kim Myung-jo				210	237	204	651
	Kim Jae-hoon	196	202	256				654
	Jo Nam-yi	157	228	259	198	200	191	1233
	Kim Kyung-min	211	189	216	224	245	161	1246
3rd place, bronze medalist(s)	Chinese Taipei (TPE)	927	1080	1000	1091	1062	978	6138
	Kao Hai-yuan	180	184	187	211	214	190	1166
	Tsai Chun-lin	144	236	232	235	233	181	1261
	Tsai Ting-yun	243	248	204	181	247	227	1350
	Hsieh Yu-ping	199	216	208	237	146	183	1189
	Chen Chih-wen	161	196	169	227	222	197	1172
3rd place, bronze medalist(s)	United Arab Emirates (UAE)	1018	996	933	1102	1035	1054	6138
	Nayef Eqab	221	238	201	186	199	181	1226
	Mohammed Al-Qubaisi	223	202	148	279	219	226	1297
	Sultan Al-Marzouqi	191	198	208	235	216	216	1264
	Shaker Ali Al-Hassan	223	180	191	190	189	248	1221
	Hulaiman Al-Hameli	160	178	185	212	212	183	1130
5	Malaysia (MAS)	1076	1006	972	1031	943	1084	6112
	Zulmazran Zulkifli	181	203	193	213	184	213	1187
	Alex Liew	247	212	182	193	235	235	1304
	Daniel Lim	231	221	226	220	154	191	1243
	Ben Heng	194	202	205	235	192	201	1229
	Gerald Samuel	223	168	166	170	178	244	1149
6	Thailand (THA)	948	996	1002	957	1104	1074	6081
	Terdporn Manophaiboon	188	172	168	206	233	221	1188
	Yannaphon Larpapharat	221	225	216	161	244	227	1294
	Bunsong Numthuam	180	202	213	202	234	221	1252
	Chawasit Phasukthaworn	185	178	224	206	234	213	1240
	Pachon Nilta	174	219	181	182	159	192	1107
7	Saudi Arabia (KSA)	888	1015	992	1025	1079	1077	6076
	Meshal Handi				213	204	206	623
	Talal Al-Towireb	176	203	231	202	244	228	1284
	Mohammed Al-Najrani	191	214	183	224	203	214	1229
	Tammam Sharif	189	210	179	186	211	223	1198
	Bassam Ghonaim	136	184	173				493
	Abidah Al-Bargi	196	204	226	200	217	206	1249
8	Philippines (PHI)	1004	1114	1059	913	981	999	6070
	Biboy Rivera	181	268	223	170	206	223	1271
	Chester King	215	201	190	223	166	208	1203
	Leonardo Rey	203	206	246	146	212	177	1190
	Paeng Nepomuceno	177	246	204	216	182	190	1215
	R. J. Bautista	228	193	196	158	215	201	1191
9	China (CHN)	981	1040	1091	1004	1030	922	6068
	Li Zhibin	184	224	184	157	194	217	1160
	Sha Mingjian	224	223	268	190	198	173	1276
	Zhang Ye	193	203	200	214	214	159	1183
	Liu Shaoyi	198	183	214	218	214	171	1198
	Sun Huaqiang	182	207	225	225	210	202	1251
10	Singapore (SIN)	985	944	1065	1066	1035	972	6067
	Alvin Kwang	188	169	184	236	202	214	1193
	Dominic Lim	169	197	192	212	237	213	1220
	Sam Goh	178	190	247	152	202	193	1162
	Lee Yu Wen	227	182	215	265	189	171	1249
	Remy Ong	223	206	227	201	205	181	1243
11	Hong Kong (HKG)	996	951	970	1029	985	1118	6049
	Hui Cheung Kwok	224	206	224	190	180	208	1232
	Chung Him	200	171	186	192	185	188	1122
	Eric Lau	188	195	164	191	227	256	1221
	Wu Siu Hong	210	181	220	279	192	239	1321
	Rocky Hui	174	198	176	177	201	227	1153
12	Qatar (QAT)	972	964	1061	1080	929	924	5930
	Mubarak Al-Merikhi	180	186	233	210	225	190	1224
	Saeed Al-Hajri	212	192	193	257	201	178	1233
	Khalifa Al-Khalifa	201	223	194	202	161	199	1180
	Khalifa Al-Kubaisi	189	148	219	177	172	164	1069
	Ahmed Shahin Al-Merikhi	190	215	222	234	170	193	1224
13	Kuwait (KUW)	959	924	989	1026	969	1002	5869
	Saleh Al-Jahjouh	213	191	189	257	197	195	1242
	Fadhel Al-Mousawi	177	185	131	181	186	205	1065
	Basel Al-Anzi	206	186	201	207	244	247	1291
	Nader Nazar	192	172	201	191	157	189	1102
	Yaqeb Al-Shatei	171	190	267	190	185	166	1169
14	Bahrain (BRN)	796	1035	963	930	1006	1040	5770
	Khalid Al-Khaja	142	181	181	197	179	182	1062
	Yusuf Mohamed Falah	181	258	160	219	170	218	1206
	Ahmed Al-Awadhi	194	175	208	169	235	209	1190
	Mahdi Asadalla	144	219	224	142	207	209	1145
	Osama Khalfan	135	202	190	203	215	222	1167
15	Macau (MAC)	990	828	1005	849	895	938	5505
	Sou Wai Chon	201	150	225	153	147	193	1069
	Choi Iao Man	216	175	196	162	212	224	1185
	Andre Souza	193	185	184	166	177	148	1053
	Jose Manuel Machon	179	191	223	189	178	184	1144
	Choi Io Fai	201	127	177	179	181	189	1054
16	Kazakhstan (KAZ)	866	859	923	1032	967	835	5482
	Abdrakhman Abinayev	149	179	175	159	158	185	1005
	Galymzhan Tashimov	145	186	142	215	169	172	1029
	Dulat Turlykhanov	180	158	214	185	198	152	1087
	Marat Turlykhanov	193	182	190	225	201	169	1160
	Kairat Baibolatov	199	154	202	248	241	157	1201
17	Mongolia (MGL)	811	818	755	859	940	897	5080
	Gendenjamtsyn Badamsambuu	158	153	138	158	212	150	969
	Miyegombyn Tüvshinsanaa	190	201	179	235	247	202	1254
	Galbadrakhyn Sunduijav	156	157	145	193	168	170	989
	Tsend-Ochiryn Bolor-Erdene	160	137	122	133	159	182	893
	Adilbishiin Baatarbold	147	170	171	140	154	193	975
Individuals
	Ayoob Hassan (BRN)	185	147	236	158	188	236	1150
	Jiang Yong (CHN)	184	174	210	149	181	246	1144
	Norman Law (HKG)	165	197	236	223	232	166	1219
	Shaik Abdul Hameed (IND)	244	192	224	154	179	202	1195
	Masaru Ito (JPN)	174	191	236	184	212	224	1221
	Kim Jae-hoon (KOR)				0	0	0	0
	Kim Myung-jo (KOR)	142	159	196				497
	Bassam Ghonaim (KSA)				190	168	216	574
	Meshal Handi (KSA)	217	226	211				654
	Tariq Al-Hajeri (KUW)	218	171	195	199	183	244	1210
	Azidi Ameran (MAS)	170	185	214	247	247	213	1276
	Tulgyn Altangerel (MGL)	160	134	192	171	146	148	951
	Christian Jan Suarez (PHI)	224	203	248	193	245	210	1323
	Abdulla Al-Qattan (QAT)	222	190	161	155	212	201	1141
	Carl de Vries (SIN)	147	185	206	171	158	198	1065
	Tsai Te-ko (TPE)	206	146	193	217	186	225	1173
	Sayed Ibrahim Al-Hashemi (UAE)	162	170	187	244	199	181	1143
