= Soft tennis at the 1998 Asian Games =

- Venue: Thammasat Tennis Field
- Dates: 11–15 December 1998
- Competitors: 86 from 11 nations

Soft tennis was a discipline of the tennis competitions at the 1998 Asian Games. Competition took place from December 11 to December 15. All events were held at the Tennis Field 3 in Thammasat University, Bangkok, Thailand.

There were four doubles and team events at the competition.

== Schedule ==
P	Preliminary rounds	¼	Quarterfinals	½	Semifinals	F	Finals

Event↓/Date →	11th Fri	12th Sat		13th Sun		14th Mon	15th Tue		
Men's doubles						P	¼	½	F
Men's team	P	P		½	F				
Women's doubles						P	¼	½	F
Women's team	P	P	½	F					

== Medalists ==
Event	Gold	Silver	Bronze
Men's doubles	Chinese Taipei; Kuo Hsu-tung; Fang Tung-hsien	Chinese Taipei; Liao Nan-kai; Yeh I-ming	South Korea; Jun In-soo; You Young-dong
Men's team	South Korea; Choi Ji-hun; Jun In-soo; Kim Hee-soo; Kim Kyung-han; You Young-dong	Chinese Taipei; Fang Tung-hsien; Kuo Hsu-tung; Liao Nan-kai; Sie Shun-feng; Yeh I-ming	Japan; Takahisa Hirayama; Hideyuki Kitamoto; Shigeo Nakahori; Hironobu Saito; Tsuneo Takagawa
Women's doubles	South Korea; Kang Ji-sook; Lee Mi-kyung	Chinese Taipei; Lin Li-jung; Cheng Shu-chen	Japan; Naoko Higashi; Yuko Miyaji
Women's team	South Korea; Kang Ji-sook; Lee Mi-hwa; Lee Mi-kyung; Yang Kum-yo; Yoon Sun-kyung	Japan; Naoko Higashi; Satoko Ishikawa; Yuko Miyaji; Shino Mizukami; Tomoka Oku	Chinese Taipei; Chang Shu-chuan; Cheng Shu-chen; Hsu I-chia; Lin Li-jung; Lin Mei-ling

== Medal table ==
Rank	Nation	Gold	Silver	Bronze	Total
1	South Korea (KOR)	3	0	1	4
2	Chinese Taipei (TPE)	1	3	1	5
3	Japan (JPN)	0	1	2	3
Totals (3 entries)		4	4	4	12

== Participating nations ==
A total of 86 athletes from 11 nations competed in soft tennis at the 1998 Asian Games:

- China (10)
- Chinese Taipei (10)
- Japan (10)
- Kazakhstan (4)
- Maldives (5)
- Mongolia (8)
- Nepal (5)
- Philippines (10)
- South Korea (10)
- Thailand (10)
- Vietnam (4)
