= Soft tennis at the 1998 Asian Games – Women's doubles =

Women's doubles at the 1998 Asian Games
- Venue: Thammasat Tennis Field
- Dates: 14–15 December 1998
- Competitors: 28 from 7 nations

Medalists
gold medal	Kang Ji-sook; Lee Mi-kyung	South Korea
silver medal	Lin Li-jung; Cheng Shu-chen	Chinese Taipei
bronze medal	Naoko Higashi; Yuko Miyaji	Japan

The women's doubles soft tennis event was part of the soft tennis programme and took place between 14 and 15 December 1998, at the Thammasat Tennis Field.

== Schedule ==
All times are Indochina Time (UTC+07:00)

Date	Time	Event
Monday, 14 December 1998	08:30	Round robin
Tuesday, 15 December 1998	08:30	Quarterfinals
Tuesday, 15 December 1998	09:40	Semifinals
Tuesday, 15 December 1998	13:00	Finals

== Results ==
=== Round robin ===
==== Pool A ====
Pos	Team	Pld	W	L	GF	GA	GD	Qualification
1	Yoon Sun-kyung (KOR) Lee Mi-hwa (KOR)	3	3	0	15	3	+12	Quarterfinals
2	Liu Ya (CHN) Bai Xia (CHN)	3	2	1	11	9	+2	Quarterfinals
3	Nuttayanee Thanowsri (THA) Sawitre Naree (THA)	3	1	2	11	11	0	
4	Tömörbaataryn Batchimeg (MGL) Nyangaryn Enkhmaa (MGL)	3	0	3	1	15	−14	

Source: Results

	Score		Game								
	Score		1	2	3	4	5	6	7	8	9
Tömörbaataryn Batchimeg (MGL); Nyangaryn Enkhmaa (MGL)	0–5	Liu Ya (CHN); Bai Xia (CHN)	0–4	1–4	0–4	1–4	1–4				
Yoon Sun-kyung (KOR); Lee Mi-hwa (KOR)	5–2	Nuttayanee Thanowsri (THA); Sawitre Naree (THA)	4–1	4–0	0–4	5–3	4–1	3–5	4–1		
Liu Ya (CHN); Bai Xia (CHN)	5–4	Nuttayanee Thanowsri (THA); Sawitre Naree (THA)	4–1	1–4	2–4	4–1	3–5	2–4	4–0	5–3	7–4
Yoon Sun-kyung (KOR); Lee Mi-hwa (KOR)	5–0	Tömörbaataryn Batchimeg (MGL); Nyangaryn Enkhmaa (MGL)	4–2	4–0	4–2	4–1	5–3				
Yoon Sun-kyung (KOR); Lee Mi-hwa (KOR)	5–1	Liu Ya (CHN); Bai Xia (CHN)	4–1	3–5	4–2	4–1	4–1	5–3			
Nuttayanee Thanowsri (THA); Sawitre Naree (THA)	5–1	Tömörbaataryn Batchimeg (MGL); Nyangaryn Enkhmaa (MGL)	5–3	5–3	4–2	4–1	2–4	5–3			

==== Pool B ====
Pos	Team	Pld	W	L	GF	GA	GD	Qualification
1	Satoko Ishikawa (JPN) Tomoka Oku (JPN)	2	2	0	10	5	+5	Quarterfinals
2	Lin Li-jung (TPE) Cheng Shu-chen (TPE)	2	1	1	7	6	+1	Quarterfinals
3	Dorothy-Jane Suarez (PHI) Petrona Bantay (PHI)	2	0	2	4	10	−6	

Source: Results

	Score		Game								
	Score		1	2	3	4	5	6	7	8	9
Lin Li-jung (TPE); Cheng Shu-chen (TPE)	5–1	Dorothy-Jane Suarez (PHI); Petrona Bantay (PHI)	4–0	4–2	4–0	4–0	3–5	4–1			
Satoko Ishikawa (JPN); Tomoka Oku (JPN)	5–3	Dorothy-Jane Suarez (PHI); Petrona Bantay (PHI)	4–0	1–4	4–1	3–5	1–4	4–0	4–1	4–2	
Lin Li-jung (TPE); Cheng Shu-chen (TPE)	2–5	Satoko Ishikawa (JPN); Tomoka Oku (JPN)	2–4	5–3	3–5	3–5	1–4	4–1	3–5		

==== Pool C ====
Pos	Team	Pld	W	L	GF	GA	GD	Qualification
1	Naoko Higashi (JPN) Yuko Miyaji (JPN)	2	2	0	10	2	+8	Quarterfinals
2	Kang Ji-sook (KOR) Lee Mi-kyung (KOR)	2	1	1	7	5	+2	Quarterfinals
3	Josephine Paguyo (PHI) Divina Escala (PHI)	2	0	2	0	10	−10	

Source: Results

	Score		Game								
	Score		1	2	3	4	5	6	7	8	9
Kang Ji-sook (KOR); Lee Mi-kyung (KOR)	2–5	Naoko Higashi (JPN); Yuko Miyaji (JPN)	3–5	1–4	3–5	4–1	5–3	3–5	2–4		
Kang Ji-sook (KOR); Lee Mi-kyung (KOR)	5–0	Josephine Paguyo (PHI); Divina Escala (PHI)	4–1	4–2	5–3	4–2	4–1				
Naoko Higashi (JPN); Yuko Miyaji (JPN)	5–0	Josephine Paguyo (PHI); Divina Escala (PHI)	4–0	4–2	4–2	4–2	4–0				

==== Pool D ====
Pos	Team	Pld	W	L	GF	GA	GD	Qualification
1	Chang Shu-chuan (TPE) Hsu I-chia (TPE)	3	3	0	15	9	+6	Quarterfinals
2	Cao Lei (CHN) Luo Xiaojie (CHN)	3	2	1	13	7	+6	Quarterfinals
3	Tanikarn Jala (THA) Walaiwan Salakhontanawat (THA)	3	1	2	10	12	−2	
4	Myagmaryn Bolorkhishig (MGL) Düürenbayaryn Mönkhtuyaa (MGL)	3	0	3	5	15	−10	

Source: Results

	Score		Game								
	Score		1	2	3	4	5	6	7	8	9
Myagmaryn Bolorkhishig (MGL); Düürenbayaryn Mönkhtuyaa (MGL)	0–5	Cao Lei (CHN); Luo Xiaojie (CHN)	1–4	3–5	1–4	2–4	0–4				
Chang Shu-chuan (TPE); Hsu I-chia (TPE)	5–3	Tanikarn Jala (THA); Walaiwan Salakhontanawat (THA)	4–0	3–5	5–3	5–3	2–4	3–5	4–0	4–2	
Cao Lei (CHN); Luo Xiaojie (CHN)	5–2	Tanikarn Jala (THA); Walaiwan Salakhontanawat (THA)	4–0	4–1	4–1	4–1	3–5	3–5	4–1		
Chang Shu-chuan (TPE); Hsu I-chia (TPE)	5–3	Myagmaryn Bolorkhishig (MGL); Düürenbayaryn Mönkhtuyaa (MGL)	4–1	4–0	4–2	2–4	4–1	2–4	3–5	4–2	
Tanikarn Jala (THA); Walaiwan Salakhontanawat (THA)	5–2	Myagmaryn Bolorkhishig (MGL); Düürenbayaryn Mönkhtuyaa (MGL)	4–0	2–4	3–5	5–3	4–2	4–2	4–1		
Chang Shu-chuan (TPE); Hsu I-chia (TPE)	5–3	Cao Lei (CHN); Luo Xiaojie (CHN)	4–0	4–2	1–4	1–4	4–2	4–1	3–5	4–0	

=== Final round ===
Quarterfinals
A1	Yoon Sun-kyung (KOR); Lee Mi-hwa (KOR)	4	2	1	1	2	3
B2	Lin Li-jung (TPE); Cheng Shu-chen (TPE)	2	4	4	4	4	5
B1	Satoko Ishikawa (JPN); Tomoka Oku (JPN)	0	0	4	3	3	1
A2	Liu Ya (CHN); Bai Xia (CHN)	4	4	0	5	5	4
C1	Naoko Higashi (JPN); Yuko Miyaji (JPN)	4	4	5	5	4
D2	Cao Lei (CHN); Luo Xiaojie (CHN)	2	1	3	3	2
D1	Chang Shu-chuan (TPE); Hsu I-chia (TPE)	1	2	4	3	4	0	0
C2	Kang Ji-sook (KOR); Lee Mi-kyung (KOR)	4	4	2	5	1	4	4

Semifinals
B2	Lin Li-jung (TPE); Cheng Shu-chen (TPE)	4	5	4	4	5
A2	Liu Ya (CHN); Bai Xia (CHN)	2	3	2	2	3
C1	Naoko Higashi (JPN); Yuko Miyaji (JPN)	3	3	5	1	1	5	4	2
C2	Kang Ji-sook (KOR); Lee Mi-kyung (KOR)	5	5	3	4	4	3	2	4

Final
B2	Lin Li-jung (TPE); Cheng Shu-chen (TPE)	3	1	2	4	2	2
C2	Kang Ji-sook (KOR); Lee Mi-kyung (KOR)	5	4	4	2	4	4
3rd–4th place
A2	Liu Ya (CHN); Bai Xia (CHN)	0	2	2	4	1	4	2
C1	Naoko Higashi (JPN); Yuko Miyaji (JPN)	4	4	4	2	4	2	4

5th–6th semifinals											5th–6th place
A1	Yoon Sun-kyung (KOR); Lee Mi-hwa (KOR)	3	5	3	5	4	4	3	3	7
B1	Satoko Ishikawa (JPN); Tomoka Oku (JPN)	5	3	5	3	1	0	5	5	5	A1	Yoon Sun-kyung (KOR); Lee Mi-hwa (KOR)	4	4	5	1	4	4
D2	Cao Lei (CHN); Luo Xiaojie (CHN)	4	4	4	2	4	1	4			D2	Cao Lei (CHN); Luo Xiaojie (CHN)	2	2	3	4	1	0
D1	Chang Shu-chuan (TPE); Hsu I-chia (TPE)	2	1	2	4	1	4	2
