= Soft tennis at the 1998 Asian Games – Men's team =

Men's team at the 1998 Asian Games
- Venue: Thammasat Tennis Field
- Dates: 11–13 December 1998
- Competitors: 52 from 11 nations

Medalists
gold medal	South Korea; Choi Ji-hun, Jun In-soo, Kim Hee-soo, Kim Kyung-han, You Young-dong
silver medal	Chinese Taipei; Fang Tung-hsien, Kuo Hsu-tung, Liao Nan-kai, Sie Shun-feng, Yeh I-ming
bronze medal	Japan; Takahisa Hirayama, Hideyuki Kitamoto, Shigeo Nakahori, Hironobu Saito, Tsuneo Takagawa

The men's team soft tennis event was part of the soft tennis programme and took place between 11 and 13 December 1998, at the Thammasat Tennis Field.

== Schedule ==
All times are Indochina Time (UTC+07:00)

Date	Time	Event
Friday, 11 December 1998	08:30	Round robin
Saturday, 12 December 1998	08:30	Round robin
Sunday, 13 December 1998	09:00	Semifinals
Sunday, 13 December 1998	13:00	Finals

== Results ==
=== Round robin ===
==== Pool A ====
Pos	Team	Pld	W	L	MF	MA	MD	Qualification
1	South Korea	5	5	0	15	2	+13	Semifinals
2	Japan	5	4	1	14	3	+11	Semifinals
3	Philippines	5	3	2	9	8	+1	5th–6th semifinals
4	Mongolia	5	2	3	8	10	−2	5th–6th semifinals
5	Kazakhstan	5	1	4	3	14	−11	
6	Nepal	5	0	5	3	15	−12	

Source: Results

11 December	South Korea	3–2	Japan

Jun In-soo / Kim Hee-soo	5–2	Hideyuki Kitamoto / Tsuneo Takagawa	5–3, 5–3, 5–3, 0–4, 4–2, 3–5, 5–3
Kim Kyung-han	3–4	Shigeo Nakahori	4–1, 4–1, 5–3, 3–5, 2–4, 2–4, 5–7
Choi Ji-hun / You Young-dong	4–5	Takahisa Hirayama / Hironobu Saito	5–3, 4–1, 4–1, 3–5, 4–1, 3–5, 2–4, 3–5, 6–8
Kim Hee-soo	4–3	Tsuneo Takagawa	1–4, 1–4, 4–0, 5–3, 5–3, 0–4, 7–5
Jun In-soo / You Young-dong	5–3	Hideyuki Kitamoto / Hironobu Saito	4–0, 4–2, 0–4, 4–1, 1–4, 4–1, 3–5, 4–1

11 December	Philippines	3–0	Nepal

Richmond Paguyo / Ali Serquina	5–0	Manoj Subba / Ashok Singh
Samuel Noguit	4–1	Bikash Pandya
Wenifredo de Leon / Samuel Noguit	5–1	Bikash Pandya / Nirmal Kaji Sthapit

11 December	Kazakhstan	0–3	Mongolia

Askhad Sydykov / Rustem Milushev	1–5	Damdinbazaryn Erdenesaikhan / Yondongiin Khuyagbaatar
Rustem Milushev	0–4	Yondongiin Khuyagbaatar
Olzhas Doskarayev / Dias Doskarayev	3–5	Naranbaataryn Mandakhnaran / Erdene-Ochiryn Enkhmönkh

11 December	Nepal	1–3	Mongolia

Nirmal Kaji Sthapit / Dushyanta Thapa	2–5	Yondongiin Khuyagbaatar / Damdinbazaryn Erdenesaikhan
Manoj Subba	4–2	Erdene-Ochiryn Enkhmönkh
Bikash Pandya / Ashok Singh	2–5	Erdene-Ochiryn Enkhmönkh / Naranbaataryn Mandakhnaran
Bikash Pandya	1–4	Yondongiin Khuyagbaatar

11 December	Japan	3–0	Kazakhstan

Hideyuki Kitamoto / Tsuneo Takagawa	5–1	Olzhas Doskarayev / Rustem Milushev
Shigeo Nakahori	4–0	Olzhas Doskarayev
Takahisa Hirayama / Hironobu Saito	5–0	Askhad Sydykov / Dias Doskarayev

11 December	South Korea	3–0	Philippines

Jun In-soo / Kim Kyung-han	5–0	Wenifredo de Leon / Samuel Noguit
Kim Hee-soo	4–0	Wenifredo de Leon
Choi Ji-hun / You Young-dong	5–1	Richmond Paguyo / Orlando Silvoza

11 December	Japan	3–0	Mongolia

Hideyuki Kitamoto / Tsuneo Takagawa	5–0	Yondongiin Khuyagbaatar / Damdinbazaryn Erdenesaikhan
Shigeo Nakahori	4–2	Yondongiin Khuyagbaatar
Takahisa Hirayama / Hironobu Saito	5–1	Erdene-Ochiryn Enkhmönkh / Naranbaataryn Mandakhnaran

11 December	Philippines	3–0	Kazakhstan

Richmond Paguyo / Orlando Silvoza	5–1	Dias Doskarayev / Olzhas Doskarayev
Richmond Paguyo	4–1	Dias Doskarayev
Wenifredo de Leon / Samuel Noguit	5–0	Rustem Milushev / Askhad Sydykov

11 December	South Korea	3–0	Nepal

Choi Ji-hun / Kim Kyung-han	5–0	Dushyanta Thapa / Manoj Subba
You Young-dong	4–1	Ashok Singh
Jun In-soo / Kim Hee-soo	5–0	Bikash Pandya / Nirmal Kaji Sthapit

12 December	South Korea	3–0	Kazakhstan

Choi Ji-hun / Kim Hee-soo	5–0	Dias Doskarayev / Olzhas Doskarayev
Kim Kyung-han	4–3	Olzhas Doskarayev
Jun In-soo / You Young-dong	5–0	Rustem Milushev / Askhad Sydykov

12 December	Philippines	3–2	Mongolia

Richmond Paguyo / Wenifredo de Leon	5–3	Yondongiin Khuyagbaatar / Damdinbazaryn Erdenesaikhan
Richmond Paguyo	4–1	Erdene-Ochiryn Enkhmönkh
Samuel Noguit / Orlando Silvoza	3–5	Naranbaataryn Mandakhnaran / Erdene-Ochiryn Enkhmönkh
Wenifredo de Leon	1–4	Yondongiin Khuyagbaatar
Samuel Noguit / Ali Serquina	5–2	Damdinbazaryn Erdenesaikhan / Naranbaataryn Mandakhnaran

12 December	Japan	3–0	Nepal

Shigeo Nakahori / Hironobu Saito	5–1	Bikash Pandya / Ashok Singh
Tsuneo Takagawa	4–0	Dushyanta Thapa
Takahisa Hirayama / Hideyuki Kitamoto	5–1	Manoj Subba / Nirmal Kaji Sthapit

12 December	Nepal	2–3	Kazakhstan

Bikash Pandya / Nirmal Kaji Sthapit	4–5	Olzhas Doskarayev / Dias Doskarayev
Manoj Subba	2–4	Olzhas Doskarayev
Ashok Singh / Manoj Subba	5–2	Rustem Milushev / Askhad Sydykov
Bikash Pandya	4–1	Askhad Sydykov
Nirmal Kaji Sthapit / Dushyanta Thapa	4–5	Rustem Milushev / Dias Doskarayev

12 December	South Korea	3–0	Mongolia

Jun In-soo / Kim Hee-soo	5–1	Yondongiin Khuyagbaatar / Damdinbazaryn Erdenesaikhan
Kim Kyung-han	4–2	Yondongiin Khuyagbaatar
Choi Ji-hun / You Young-dong	5–0	Erdene-Ochiryn Enkhmönkh / Naranbaataryn Mandakhnaran

12 December	Japan	3–0	Philippines

Takahisa Hirayama / Tsuneo Takagawa	5–0	Samuel Noguit / Orlando Silvoza
Shigeo Nakahori	4–0	Richmond Paguyo
Hideyuki Kitamoto / Hironobu Saito	5–1	Richmond Paguyo / Wenifredo de Leon

==== Pool B ====
Pos	Team	Pld	W	L	MF	MA	MD	Qualification
1	Chinese Taipei	4	4	0	12	2	+10	Semifinals
2	China	4	3	1	11	3	+8	Semifinals
3	Thailand	4	2	2	6	6	0	5th–6th semifinals
4	Maldives	4	1	3	3	10	−7	5th–6th semifinals
5	Vietnam	4	0	4	1	12	−11	

Source: Results

11 December	Vietnam	1–3	Maldives

Nguyễn Hữu Đức / Lê Minh Sơn	0–5	Amir Mansoor / Ibrahim Fareeh
Trần Duy Hưng	4–2	Ibrahim Fareeh
Lý Đức Trung / Trần Duy Hưng	Ignaz Mansoor / Hassan Shaam
Lê Minh Sơn	0–4	Mohamed Fazeeh

11 December	Chinese Taipei	3–2	China

Liao Nan-kai / Yeh I-ming	2–5	Wang Dazhi / Zhang Binbing	4–2, 3–5, 5–3, 0–4, 0–4, 2–4, 3–5
Sie Shun-feng	1–4	Chen Yadong	0–4, 5–3, 1–4, 1–4, 3–5
Fang Tung-hsien / Kuo Hsu-tung	5–0	Chen Yadong / Jiang Bin	4–2, 4–2, 4–2, 5–3, 4–1
Liao Nan-kai	4–1	Zhang Zhuo	4–1, 5–3, 3–5, 4–0, 4–0
Sie Shun-feng / Yeh I-ming	5–0	Wang Dazhi / Jiang Bin	4–2, 4–1, 4–1, 4–1, 4–2

11 December	Chinese Taipei	3–0	Vietnam

Yeh I-ming / Liao Nan-kai	5–0	Lê Minh Sơn / Trần Duy Hưng
Sie Shun-feng	4–0	Lê Minh Sơn
Fang Tung-hsien / Kuo Hsu-tung	5–0	Nguyễn Hữu Đức / Lý Đức Trung

11 December	China	3–0	Thailand

Chen Yadong / Jiang Bin	5–2	Chanapong Sirisap / Vichapan Tepkasikul
Chen Yadong	4–2	Akkasit Tepkasikul
Wang Dazhi / Zhang Binbing	5–2	Wachirachai Suwannaseri / Akkasit Tepkasikul

11 December	Chinese Taipei	3–0	Maldives

Sie Shun-feng / Fang Tung-hsien	5–0	Amir Mansoor / Mohamed Fazeeh
Kuo Hsu-tung	4–0	Mohamed Fazeeh
Yeh I-ming / Liao Nan-kai	5–1	Ignaz Mansoor / Hassan Shaam

11 December	Vietnam	0–3	Thailand

Lê Minh Sơn / Trần Duy Hưng	0–5	Chanapong Sirisap / Vichapan Tepkasikul
Trần Duy Hưng	0–4	Akkasit Tepkasikul
Nguyễn Hữu Đức / Lý Đức Trung	0–5	Wachirachai Suwannaseri / Akkasit Tepkasikul

12 December	Chinese Taipei	3–0	Thailand

Kuo Hsu-tung / Fang Tung-hsien	5–0	Chanapong Sirisap / Akkasit Tepkasikul
Liao Nan-kai	4–0	Akkasit Tepkasikul
Sie Shun-feng / Yeh I-ming	5–2	Wachirachai Suwannaseri / Vichapan Tepkasikul

12 December	China	3–0	Maldives

Chen Yadong / Jiang Bin	5–2	Amir Mansoor / Mohamed Fazeeh
Wang Dazhi	4–1	Ibrahim Fareeh
Zhang Zhuo / Zhang Binbing	5–2	Ignaz Mansoor / Hassan Shaam

12 December	China	3–0	Vietnam

Chen Yadong / Jiang Bin	5–0	Trần Duy Hưng / Nguyễn Hữu Đức
Wang Dazhi	4–1	Trần Duy Hưng
Zhang Zhuo / Zhang Binbing	5–0	Lê Minh Sơn / Lý Đức Trung

12 December	Maldives	0–3	Thailand

Amir Mansoor / Mohamed Fazeeh	0–5	Chanapong Sirisap / Vichapan Tepkasikul
Ibrahim Fareeh	2–4	Akkasit Tepkasikul
Ignaz Mansoor / Hassan Shaam	0–5	Wachirachai Suwannaseri / Akkasit Tepkasikul

=== 5th–6th place ===
5th–6th semifinals			5th–6th final
A3	Philippines	3
B4	Maldives	0	A3	Philippines	0
B3	Thailand	3	B3	Thailand	3
A4	Mongolia	0

==== 5th–6th semifinals ====
13 December	Philippines	3–0	Maldives

Wenifredo de Leon / Richmond Paguyo
Richmond Paguyo
Samuel Noguit / Orlando Silvoza

Amir Mansoor / Mohamed Fazeeh
Ibrahim Fareeh
Hassan Shaam / Ignaz Mansoor

13 December	Thailand	3–0	Mongolia

Chanapong Sirisap / Vichapan Tepkasikul
Akkasit Tepkasikul
Wachirachai Suwannaseri / Akkasit Tepkasikul

Yondongiin Khuyagbaatar / Damdinbazaryn Erdenesaikhan
Yondongiin Khuyagbaatar
Naranbaataryn Mandakhnaran / Erdene-Ochiryn Enkhmönkh

==== 5th–6th final ====
13 December	Philippines	0–3	Thailand

Wenifredo de Leon / Samuel Noguit
Richmond Paguyo
Richmond Paguyo / Orlando Silvoza

Chanapong Sirisap / Vichapan Tepkasikul
Akkasit Tepkasikul
Wachirachai Suwannaseri / Akkasit Tepkasikul

=== Final round ===
Semifinals
A1	South Korea	3
B2	China	0
B1	Chinese Taipei	3
A2	Japan	2

Final
A1	South Korea	3
B1	Chinese Taipei	2
3rd–4th place
B2	China	1
A2	Japan	3

==== Semifinals ====
13 December	South Korea	3–0	China

Jun In-soo / You Young-dong	5–1	Chen Yadong / Jiang Bin
Kim Hee-soo	4–0	Zhang Zhuo
Choi Ji-hun / Kim Kyung-han	5–2	Wang Dazhi / Zhang Binbing

13 December	Chinese Taipei	3–2	Japan

Liao Nan-kai / Yeh I-ming	5–4	Hideyuki Kitamoto / Tsuneo Takagawa
Fang Tung-hsien	2–4	Shigeo Nakahori
Fang Tung-hsien / Kuo Hsu-tung	3–5	Takahisa Hirayama / Hironobu Saito
Liao Nan-kai	4–1	Tsuneo Takagawa
Sie Shun-feng / Yeh I-ming	5–3	Hideyuki Kitamoto / Hironobu Saito

==== 3rd–4th place ====
13 December	China	1–3	Japan

Wang Dazhi / Zhang Binbing
Chen Yadong
Chen Yadong / Jiang Bin
Zhang Binbing

Takahisa Hirayama / Tsuneo Takagawa
Shigeo Nakahori
Hideyuki Kitamoto / Hironobu Saito
Tsuneo Takagawa

==== Final ====
13 December	South Korea	3–2	Chinese Taipei

Jun In-soo / Kim Hee-soo	2–5	Liao Nan-kai / Yeh I-ming	2–4, 1–4, 4–2, 4–1, 1–4, 2–4, 2–4
Kim Kyung-han	4–3	Sie Shun-feng	3–5, 5–3, 1–4, 4–2, 1–4, 4–1, 7–2
Choi Ji-hun / You Young-dong	2–5	Fang Tung-hsien / Kuo Hsu-tung	3–5, 1–4, 4–1, 0–4, 2–4, 4–2, 2–4
Kim Hee-soo	4–3	Liao Nan-kai	5–3, 2–4, 3–5, 3–5, 5–3, 4–2, 7–5
Jun In-soo / You Young-dong	5–1	Sie Shun-feng / Yeh I-ming	5–3, 4–1, 2–4, 4–2, 4–1, 4–2

== Non-participating athletes ==
- Wachira Bunsiri (THA)
