= Soft tennis at the 1998 Asian Games – Men's doubles =

Men's doubles at the 1998 Asian Games
- Venue: Thammasat Tennis Field
- Dates: 14–15 December 1998
- Competitors: 44 from 11 nations

Medalists
gold medal	Kuo Hsu-tung; Fang Tung-hsien	Chinese Taipei
silver medal	Liao Nan-kai; Yeh I-ming	Chinese Taipei
bronze medal	Jun In-soo; You Young-dong	South Korea

The men's doubles soft tennis event was part of the soft tennis programme and took place between 14 and 15 December 1998, at the Thammasat Tennis Field.

== Schedule ==
All times are Indochina Time (UTC+07:00)

Date	Time	Event
Monday, 14 December 1998	08:30	Round robin
Tuesday, 15 December 1998	08:30	Quarterfinals
Tuesday, 15 December 1998	09:40	Semifinals
Tuesday, 15 December 1998	13:00	Finals

== Results ==
=== Round robin ===
==== Pool A ====
Pos	Team	Pld	W	L	GF	GA	GD	Qualification
1	Liao Nan-kai (TPE) Yeh I-ming (TPE)	2	2	0	10	1	+9	Quarterfinals
2	Wachirachai Suwannaseri (THA) Akkasit Tepkasikul (THA)	2	1	1	6	5	+1	
3	Rustem Milushev (KAZ) Olzhas Doskarayev (KAZ)	2	0	2	0	10	−10	

Source: Results

	Score		Game								
	Score		1	2	3	4	5	6	7	8	9
Liao Nan-kai (TPE); Yeh I-ming (TPE)	5–1	Wachirachai Suwannaseri (THA); Akkasit Tepkasikul (THA)	3–5	4–2	4–0	4–0	5–3	5–3			
Liao Nan-kai (TPE); Yeh I-ming (TPE)	5–0	Rustem Milushev (KAZ); Olzhas Doskarayev (KAZ)	4–0	4–1	4–1	4–0	4–1				
Rustem Milushev (KAZ); Olzhas Doskarayev (KAZ)	0–5	Wachirachai Suwannaseri (THA); Akkasit Tepkasikul (THA)	2–4	3–5	3–5	3–5	1–4				

==== Pool B ====
Pos	Team	Pld	W	L	GF	GA	GD	Qualification
1	Hideyuki Kitamoto (JPN) Hironobu Saito (JPN)	2	2	0	10	0	+10	Quarterfinals
2	Erdene-Ochiryn Enkhmönkh (MGL) Naranbaataryn Mandakhnaran (MGL)	2	1	1	5	8	−3	
3	Nguyễn Hữu Đức (VIE) Lý Đức Trung (VIE)	2	0	2	3	10	−7	

Source: Results

	Score		Game								
	Score		1	2	3	4	5	6	7	8	9
Hideyuki Kitamoto (JPN); Hironobu Saito (JPN)	5–0	Nguyễn Hữu Đức (VIE); Lý Đức Trung (VIE)	4–1	4–0	4–1	4–0	4–1				
Hideyuki Kitamoto (JPN); Hironobu Saito (JPN)	5–0	Erdene-Ochiryn Enkhmönkh (MGL); Naranbaataryn Mandakhnaran (MGL)	4–0	4–1	4–0	4–0	4–2				
Nguyễn Hữu Đức (VIE); Lý Đức Trung (VIE)	3–5	Erdene-Ochiryn Enkhmönkh (MGL); Naranbaataryn Mandakhnaran (MGL)	5–3	3–5	3–5	0–4	0–4	4–2	4–2	0–4	

==== Pool C ====
Pos	Team	Pld	W	L	GF	GA	GD	Qualification
1	Jun In-soo (KOR) You Young-dong (KOR)	1	1	0	5	1	+4	Quarterfinals
2	Samuel Noguit (PHI) Orlando Silvoza (PHI)	1	0	1	1	5	−4	

Source: Results

	Score		Game								
	Score		1	2	3	4	5	6	7	8	9
Jun In-soo (KOR); You Young-dong (KOR)	5–1	Samuel Noguit (PHI); Orlando Silvoza (PHI)	4–0	4–1	4–0	4–1	1–4	4–1			

==== Pool D ====
Pos	Team	Pld	W	L	GF	GA	GD	Qualification
1	Zhang Binbing (CHN) Wang Dazhi (CHN)	2	2	0	10	0	+10	Quarterfinals
2	Manoj Subba (NEP) Dushyanta Thapa (NEP)	2	1	1	5	7	−2	
3	Hassan Shaam (MDV) Ignaz Mansoor (MDV)	2	0	2	2	10	−8	

Source: Results

	Score		Game								
	Score		1	2	3	4	5	6	7	8	9
Zhang Binbing (CHN); Wang Dazhi (CHN)	5–0	Manoj Subba (NEP); Dushyanta Thapa (NEP)	4–0	4–1	4–1	4–1	4–1				
Zhang Binbing (CHN); Wang Dazhi (CHN)	5–0	Hassan Shaam (MDV); Ignaz Mansoor (MDV)	4–0	4–0	4–1	4–1	4–0				
Manoj Subba (NEP); Dushyanta Thapa (NEP)	5–2	Hassan Shaam (MDV); Ignaz Mansoor (MDV)	0–4	4–0	1–4	5–3	4–0	4–2	5–3		

==== Pool E ====
Pos	Team	Pld	W	L	GF	GA	GD	Qualification
1	Kuo Hsu-tung (TPE) Fang Tung-hsien (TPE)	2	2	0	10	1	+9	Quarterfinals
2	Damdinbazaryn Erdenesaikhan (MGL) Yondongiin Khuyagbaatar (MGL)	2	1	1	5	6	−1	
3	Trần Duy Hưng (VIE) Lê Minh Sơn (VIE)	2	0	2	2	10	−8	

Source: Results

	Score		Game								
	Score		1	2	3	4	5	6	7	8	9
Kuo Hsu-tung (TPE); Fang Tung-hsien (TPE)	5–1	Trần Duy Hưng (VIE); Lê Minh Sơn (VIE)	4–0	4–1	4–1	2–4	4–0	4–0			
Kuo Hsu-tung (TPE); Fang Tung-hsien (TPE)	5–0	Damdinbazaryn Erdenesaikhan (MGL); Yondongiin Khuyagbaatar (MGL)	4–2	4–1	4–0	4–1	4–0				
Trần Duy Hưng (VIE); Lê Minh Sơn (VIE)	1–5	Damdinbazaryn Erdenesaikhan (MGL); Yondongiin Khuyagbaatar (MGL)	0–4	2–4	0–4	4–0	3–5	1–4			

==== Pool F ====
Pos	Team	Pld	W	L	GF	GA	GD	Qualification
1	Shigeo Nakahori (JPN) Tsuneo Takagawa (JPN)	1	1	0	5	0	+5	Quarterfinals
2	Bikash Pandya (NEP) Ashok Singh (NEP)	1	0	1	0	5	−5	

Source: Results

	Score		Game								
	Score		1	2	3	4	5	6	7	8	9
Shigeo Nakahori (JPN); Tsuneo Takagawa (JPN)	5–0	Bikash Pandya (NEP); Ashok Singh (NEP)	4–0	4–1	4–0	4–0	5–3				

==== Pool G ====
Pos	Team	Pld	W	L	GF	GA	GD	Qualification
1	Choi Ji-hun (KOR) Kim Kyung-han (KOR)	2	2	0	10	3	+7	Quarterfinals
2	Wachirachai Suwannaseri (THA) Akkasit Tepkasikul (THA)	2	1	1	6	7	−1	
3	Rustem Milushev (KAZ) Olzhas Doskarayev (KAZ)	2	0	2	4	10	−6	

Source: Results

	Score		Game								
	Score		1	2	3	4	5	6	7	8	9
Choi Ji-hun (KOR); Kim Kyung-han (KOR)	5–1	Wenifredo de Leon (PHI); Richmond Paguyo (PHI)	4–2	3–5	4–0	4–2	5–3	4–2			
Choi Ji-hun (KOR); Kim Kyung-han (KOR)	5–2	Amir Mansoor (MDV); Mohamed Fazeeh (MDV)	4–0	5–3	4–0	1–4	4–1	2–4	4–1		
Wenifredo de Leon (PHI); Richmond Paguyo (PHI)	5–2	Amir Mansoor (MDV); Mohamed Fazeeh (MDV)	2–4	3–5	5–3	5–3	4–2	4–0	4–1		

==== Pool H ====
Pos	Team	Pld	W	L	GF	GA	GD	Qualification
1	Chen Yadong (CHN) Jiang Bin (CHN)	2	2	0	10	1	+9	Quarterfinals
2	Wachirachai Suwannaseri (THA) Akkasit Tepkasikul (THA)	2	1	1	6	5	+1	
3	Rustem Milushev (KAZ) Olzhas Doskarayev (KAZ)	2	0	2	0	10	−10	

Source: Results

	Score		Game								
	Score		1	2	3	4	5	6	7	8	9
Chen Yadong (CHN); Jiang Bin (CHN)	5–0	Askhad Sydykov (KAZ); Olzhas Doskarayev (KAZ)	4–2	5–3	4–1	4–1	4–2				
Chen Yadong (CHN); Jiang Bin (CHN)	5–4	Akkasit Tepkasikul (THA); Chanapong Sirisap (THA)	4–0	4–2	3–5	4–1	1–4	2–4	1–4	4–2	8–6
Askhad Sydykov (KAZ); Olzhas Doskarayev (KAZ)	0–5	Akkasit Tepkasikul (THA); Chanapong Sirisap (THA)	2–4	2–4	2–4	3–5	2–4				

=== Final round ===
Quarterfinals
A1	Liao Nan-kai (TPE); Yeh I-ming (TPE)	4	3	2	1	4	4	4	2	7
D1	Zhang Binbing (CHN); Wang Dazhi (CHN)	1	5	4	4	1	2	0	4	3
B1	Hideyuki Kitamoto (JPN); Hironobu Saito (JPN)	0	5	4	3	3	2	5	2
C1	Jun In-soo (KOR); You Young-dong (KOR)	4	3	0	5	5	4	3	4
E1	Kuo Hsu-tung (TPE); Fang Tung-hsien (TPE)	4	4	5	4	5
H1	Chen Yadong (CHN); Jiang Bin (CHN)	2	1	3	1	3
F1	Shigeo Nakahori (JPN); Tsuneo Takagawa (JPN)	1	1	4	3	4	1	4	4	4
G1	Choi Ji-hun (KOR); Kim Kyung-han (KOR)	4	4	2	5	2	4	2	1	7

Semifinals
A1	Liao Nan-kai (TPE); Yeh I-ming (TPE)	4	2	4	4	2	2	4	0	7
C1	Jun In-soo (KOR); You Young-dong (KOR)	1	4	2	0	4	4	2	4	5
E1	Kuo Hsu-tung (TPE); Fang Tung-hsien (TPE)	4	4	2	4	4	2	5
G1	Choi Ji-hun (KOR); Kim Kyung-han (KOR)	1	2	4	0	1	4	3

Final
A1	Liao Nan-kai (TPE); Yeh I-ming (TPE)	5	0	3	5	0	3	0
E1	Kuo Hsu-tung (TPE); Fang Tung-hsien (TPE)	3	4	5	3	4	5	4
3rd–4th place
C1	Jun In-soo (KOR); You Young-dong (KOR)	2	3	4	2	5	3	4	4	7
G1	Choi Ji-hun (KOR); Kim Kyung-han (KOR)	4	5	0	4	3	5	0	1	5

5th–6th semifinals								5th–6th place
D1	Zhang Binbing (CHN); Wang Dazhi (CHN)	0	4	2	3	2	2
B1	Hideyuki Kitamoto (JPN); Hironobu Saito (JPN)	4	2	4	5	4	4	B1	Hideyuki Kitamoto (JPN); Hironobu Saito (JPN)	4	0	3	5	5	5	2	4
H1	Chen Yadong (CHN); Jiang Bin (CHN)	2	2	5	3	1	0	F1	Shigeo Nakahori (JPN); Tsuneo Takagawa (JPN)	1	4	5	3	3	3	4	0
F1	Shigeo Nakahori (JPN); Tsuneo Takagawa (JPN)	4	4	3	5	4	4
