= Soft tennis at the 1998 Asian Games – Women's team =

Women's team at the 1998 Asian Games
- Venue: Thammasat Tennis Field
- Dates: 11–13 December 1998
- Competitors: 34 from 7 nations

Medalists
gold medal	South Korea; Kang Ji-sook, Lee Mi-hwa, Lee Mi-kyung, Yang Kum-yo, Yoon Sun-kyung
silver medal	Japan; Naoko Higashi, Satoko Ishikawa, Yuko Miyaji, Shino Mizukami, Tomoka Oku
bronze medal	Chinese Taipei; Chang Shu-chuan, Cheng Shu-chen, Hsu I-chia, Lin Li-jung, Lin Mei-ling

The women's team soft tennis event was part of the soft tennis programme and took place between 11 and 13 December 1998, at the Thammasat Tennis Field.

== Schedule ==
All times are Indochina Time (UTC+07:00)

Date	Time	Event
Friday, 11 December 1998	10:15	Round robin
Saturday, 12 December 1998	08:30	Round robin
Saturday, 12 December 1998	13:40	Semifinals
Sunday, 13 December 1998	09:00	Finals

== Results ==
=== Round robin ===
==== Pool A ====
Pos	Team	Pld	W	L	MF	MA	MD	Qualification
1	South Korea	3	3	0	9	0	+9	Semifinals
2	China	3	2	1	6	3	+3	Semifinals
3	Thailand	3	1	2	3	7	−4	5th–6th place
4	Mongolia	3	0	3	1	9	−8	

Source: Results

11 December	South Korea	3–0	China

Yoon Sun-kyung / Lee Mi-hwa	5–4	Bai Xia / Liu Ya
Kang Ji-sook	4–3	Luo Xiaojie
Yang Kum-yo / Lee Mi-kyung	5–0	Luo Xiaojie / Cao Lei

11 December	Thailand	3–1	Mongolia

Panadda Sunthornkalam / Walaiwan Salakhontanawat	3–5	Myagmaryn Bolorkhishig / Düürenbayaryn Mönkhtuyaa
Sawitre Naree	4–1	Düürenbayaryn Mönkhtuyaa
Sawitre Naree / Nuttayanee Thanowsri	Myagmaryn Bolorkhishig / Tömörbaataryn Batchimeg
Tanikarn Jala	4–0	Nyangaryn Enkhmaa

11 December	South Korea	3–0	Thailand

Kang Ji-sook / Lee Mi-hwa	5–4	Sawitre Naree / Nuttayanee Thanowsri
Yoon Sun-kyung	4–0	Sawitre Naree
Yang Kum-yo / Lee Mi-kyung	5–3	Tanikarn Jala / Walaiwan Salakhontanawat

11 December	China	3–0	Mongolia

Luo Xiaojie / Liu Ya	5–0	Nyangaryn Enkhmaa / Tömörbaataryn Batchimeg
Cao Lei	4–0	Myagmaryn Bolorkhishig
Bai Xia / Cao Lei	5–1	Düürenbayaryn Mönkhtuyaa / Myagmaryn Bolorkhishig

12 December	South Korea	3–0	Mongolia

Yoon Sun-kyung / Lee Mi-hwa	5–1	Myagmaryn Bolorkhishig / Düürenbayaryn Mönkhtuyaa
Kang Ji-sook	4–2	Myagmaryn Bolorkhishig
Yang Kum-yo / Lee Mi-kyung	5–0	Tömörbaataryn Batchimeg / Nyangaryn Enkhmaa

12 December	China	3–0	Thailand

Luo Xiaojie / Liu Ya	5–0	Panadda Sunthornkalam / Sawitre Naree
Cao Lei	4–2	Tanikarn Jala
Bai Xia / Cao Lei	5–1	Nuttayanee Thanowsri / Sawitre Naree

==== Pool B ====
Pos	Team	Pld	W	L	MF	MA	MD	Qualification
1	Japan	2	2	0	6	1	+5	Semifinals
2	Chinese Taipei	2	1	1	3	3	0	Semifinals
3	Philippines	2	0	2	1	6	−5	5th–6th place

Source: Results

11 December	Chinese Taipei	0–3	Japan

Lin Mei-ling / Hsu I-chia	1–5	Naoko Higashi / Yuko Miyaji	1–4, 2–4, 0–4, 2–4, 5–3, 2–4
Chang Shu-chuan	2–4	Shino Mizukami	2–4, 3–5, 5–3, 2–4, 4–2, 3–5
Lin Li-jung / Cheng Shu-chen	4–5	Satoko Ishikawa / Tomoka Oku	4–1, 4–1, 3–5, 4–1, 4–2, 2–4, 3–5, 2–4, 6–8

12 December	Japan	3–1	Philippines

Naoko Higashi / Yuko Miyaji	5–3	Josephine Paguyo / Dorothy-Jane Suarez	4–1, 0–4, 0–4, 2–4, 4–0, 5–3, 4–0, 4–0
Shino Mizukami	1–4	Josephine Paguyo	2–4, 1–4, 0–4, 4–1, 0–4
Satoko Ishikawa / Tomoka Oku	5–2	Divina Escala / Petrona Bantay	3–5, 4–0, 3–5, 4–1, 4–2, 4–2, 5–3
Naoko Higashi	4–0	Petrona Bantay	4–2, 4–0, 4–0, 5–3

12 December	Chinese Taipei	3–0	Philippines

Lin Li-jung / Cheng Shu-chen	5–1	Petrona Bantay / Divina Escala
Chang Shu-chuan	4–0	Josephine Paguyo
Hsu I-chia / Lin Mei-ling	5–3	Josephine Paguyo / Dorothy-Jane Suarez

=== 5th–6th place ===
13 December	Thailand	3–1	Philippines

Panadda Sunthornkalam / Walaiwan Salakhontanawat
Sawitre Naree
Sawitre Naree / Nuttayanee Thanowsri
Tanikarn Jala

Dorothy-Jane Suarez / Karen Bundalian
Josephine Paguyo
Josephine Paguyo / Divina Escala
Petrona Bantay

=== Final round ===
Semifinals
A1	South Korea	3
B2	Chinese Taipei	0
B1	Japan	3
A2	China	0

Final
A1	South Korea	3
B1	Japan	1
3rd–4th place
B2	Chinese Taipei	3
A2	China	2

==== Semifinals ====
12 December	South Korea	3–0	Chinese Taipei

Yoon Sun-kyung / Lee Mi-hwa	5–0	Lin Li-jung / Cheng Shu-chen	4–1, 5–3, 4–2, 5–3, 5–3
Kang Ji-sook	4–1	Chang Shu-chuan	5–3, 5–3, 3–5, 4–2, 4–0
Yang Kum-yo / Lee Mi-kyung	Lin Mei-ling / Cheng Shu-chen

12 December	Japan	3–0	China

Naoko Higashi / Yuko Miyaji	5–2	Luo Xiaojie / Liu Ya	4–1, 4–2, 3–5, 4–0, 1–4, 4–1, 5–3
Shino Mizukami	4–1	Cao Lei	4–2, 4–2, 1–4, 5–3, 4–2
Satoko Ishikawa / Tomoka Oku	5–2	Bai Xia / Cao Lei	4–2, 4–2, 4–2, 5–3, 2–4, 1–4, 4–1

==== 3rd–4th place ====
13 December	Chinese Taipei	3–2	China

Lin Li-jung / Cheng Shu-chen	Luo Xiaojie / Cao Lei
Lin Mei-ling	Luo Xiaojie
Chang Shu-chuan / Hsu I-chia	Wang Mei / Liu Ya
Lin Li-jung	Cao Lei
Lin Mei-ling / Cheng Shu-chen	Bai Xia / Liu Ya

==== Final ====
13 December	South Korea	3–1	Japan

Yoon Sun-kyung / Lee Mi-hwa	5–3	Naoko Higashi / Yuko Miyaji	3–5, 4–2, 1–4, 4–1, 4–1, 0–4, 4–2, 4–2
Kang Ji-sook	4–1	Shino Mizukami	5–3, 4–2, 5–3, 1–4, 4–1
Yang Kum-yo / Lee Mi-kyung	2–5	Satoko Ishikawa / Tomoka Oku	2–4, 5–3, 1–4, 3–5, 3–5, 4–2, 1–4
Yoon Sun-kyung	4–2	Naoko Higashi	2–4, 4–0, 3–5, 4–2, 5–3, 4–0
