= Bowling at the 1998 Asian Games – Women's trios =

Women's trios at the 1998 Asian Games
- Venue: P.S. Bowling Bangkapi
- Date: 11–12 December 1998
- Competitors: 45 from 8 nations

Medalists
gold medal	Chinese Taipei; Tseng Su-fen, Chou Miao-lin, Kuo Shu-chen
silver medal	Thailand; Wannasiri Duangdee, Phetchara Kaewsuk, Supaporn Chuanprasertkit
bronze medal	Singapore; Jesmine Ho, Alice Tay, Grace Young

The women's trios competition at the 1998 Asian Games in Bangkok was held on 11 and 12 December 1998 at P.S. Bowling.

== Schedule ==
All times are Indochina Time (UTC+07:00)

Date	Time	Event
Friday, 11 December 1998	09:00	1st block
Saturday, 12 December 1998	16:00	2nd block

== Results ==
Rank	Team	Score
1st place, gold medalist(s)	Chinese Taipei (TPE); Tseng Su-fen; Chou Miao-lin; Kuo Shu-chen	3776
2nd place, silver medalist(s)	Thailand (THA); Wannasiri Duangdee; Phetchara Kaewsuk; Supaporn Chuanprasertkit	3682
3rd place, bronze medalist(s)	Singapore (SIN); Jesmine Ho; Alice Tay; Grace Young	3607
4	Japan (JPN); Mari Kimura; Shima Washizuka; Nachimi Itakura	3559
5	Chinese Taipei (TPE); Huang Chiung-yao; Wang Yu-ling; Ku Hui-chin	3536
6	Malaysia (MAS); Low Poh Lian; Shalin Zulkifli; Sarah Yap	3525
7	South Korea (KOR); Lee Ji-yeon; Lee Mi-young; Cha Mi-jung	3512
8	Philippines (PHI); Bong Coo; Cecilia Yap; Arianne Cerdeña	3463
9	South Korea (KOR); Kim Yeau-jin; Kim Sook-young; Kim Hee-soon	3397
10	Philippines (PHI); Lizette Garcia; Josephine Canare; Liza Clutario	3356
11	Japan (JPN); Ayano Katai; Tomomi Shibata; Tomie Kawaguchi	3354
12	Malaysia (MAS); Karen Lian; Lai Kin Ngoh; Sharon Low	3340
13	Singapore (SIN); Doreen Pang; Catherine Kang; Lee Poh Leng	3258
14	North Korea (PRK); Kang Yong-sun; O Kum-ok; Kim Yon-ok	3232
15	Thailand (THA); Butsaracum Poskrisana; Penpaka Chaintrvong; Panumart Srisuratpipit	3141
