= Bowling at the 2002 Asian Games – Women's singles =

Women's singles at the 2002 Asian Games
- Venue: Homeplus Asiad Bowling Alley
- Date: 3 October 2002
- Competitors: 49 from 10 nations

Medalists
gold medal	Kim Soo-kyung	South Korea
silver medal	Miyuki Kubotani	Japan
bronze medal	Liza Clutario	Philippines

The women's singles competition at the 2002 Asian Games in Busan was held on 3 October 2002 at the Homeplus Asiad Bowling Alley.

== Schedule ==
All times are Korea Standard Time (UTC+09:00)

Date	Time	Event
Thursday, 3 October 2002	13:30	Squad A

== Results ==
Rank	Athlete	Game						Total
Rank	Athlete	1	2	3	4	5	6	Total
1st place, gold medalist(s)	Kim Soo-kyung (KOR)	256	212	171	233	246	244	1362
2nd place, silver medalist(s)	Miyuki Kubotani (JPN)	235	195	201	256	235	212	1334
3rd place, bronze medalist(s)	Liza Clutario (PHI)	198	217	196	234	227	236	1308
4	Liza del Rosario (PHI)	236	177	214	213	205	259	1304
5	Kim Hyo-mi (KOR)	192	222	218	202	255	211	1300
6	Valerie Teo (SIN)	165	171	264	212	279	203	1294
7	Wang Yi-fen (TPE)	235	215	217	179	204	228	1278
8	Shalin Zulkifli (MAS)	225	191	234	186	208	219	1263
9	Wang Yu-ling (TPE)	203	212	225	214	195	211	1260
9	Mari Kimura (JPN)	239	202	230	206	214	169	1260
11	Kim Hee-soon (KOR)	214	237	180	179	246	196	1252
12	Nachimi Itakura (JPN)	190	214	203	243	190	203	1243
13	Janet Lam (HKG)	187	203	178	205	231	236	1240
14	Jennifer Tan (SIN)	181	203	224	182	236	208	1234
15	Chou Miao-lin (TPE)	204	185	212	257	224	147	1229
16	Huang Tsai-feng (TPE)	212	204	199	179	193	235	1222
17	Cha Mi-jung (KOR)	191	209	202	204	212	203	1221
18	Jesmine Ho (SIN)	185	191	184	212	225	199	1196
19	Huang Chung-yao (TPE)	215	182	211	187	194	204	1193
20	Wendy Chai (MAS)	169	209	193	193	190	237	1191
21	Ayano Katai (JPN)	202	164	236	213	183	191	1189
22	Tomomi Shibata (JPN)	187	205	160	246	200	189	1187
23	Jenny Ho (HKG)	216	167	203	181	199	220	1186
24	Sharon Chai (MAS)	181	189	194	206	177	234	1181
25	Kim Yeau-jin (KOR)	196	161	216	247	173	182	1175
26	Lai Kin Ngoh (MAS)	213	180	194	223	162	195	1167
27	Cookie Lee (HKG)	248	155	135	225	190	194	1147
28	Nam Bo-ra (KOR)	179	171	177	216	204	198	1145
29	Lisa Kwan (MAS)	167	245	183	205	162	181	1143
29	Donlaya Larpapharat (THA)	201	199	155	202	173	213	1143
31	Josephine Canare (PHI)	235	189	174	191	180	173	1142
32	Irene Garcia (PHI)	183	158	169	197	211	223	1141
33	Vanessa Fung (HKG)	221	190	177	160	179	204	1131
34	Rena Teng (SIN)	220	182	149	174	203	200	1128
35	Hiroko Shimizu (JPN)	202	170	204	193	182	175	1126
36	Veronica Wong (HKG)	179	187	168	188	211	179	1112
37	Chu Yu-chieh (TPE)	216	164	205	177	193	155	1110
38	Kathleen Ann Lopez (PHI)	159	192	193	178	181	203	1106
39	Cecilia Yap (PHI)	182	177	210	193	181	161	1104
40	Wannasiri Duangdee (THA)	159	125	163	214	226	216	1103
41	Alice Tay (SIN)	181	226	146	205	149	188	1095
42	Sarah Yap (MAS)	170	197	176	201	185	159	1088
43	Yap Seok Kim (SIN)	159	200	194	160	164	198	1075
44	Thunyaporn Chaintrvong (THA)	151	182	203	164	160	201	1061
45	Choi Suk Yee (HKG)	196	192	166	189	154	156	1053
46	Filomena Choi (MAC)	202	184	166	147	171	178	1048
47	Choijingiin Amardelger (MGL)	101	159	144	132	162	112	810
48	Idersaikhany Tungalag (MGL)	100	114	131	133	119	93	690
49	Gantömöriin Solongo (MGL)	113	156	100	83	105	88	645
