= Bowling at the 1998 Asian Games – Women's doubles =

Women's doubles at the 1998 Asian Games
- Venue: P.S. Bowling Bangkapi
- Date: 10 December 1998
- Competitors: 46 from 9 nations

Medalists
gold medal	Lee Ji-yeon; Lee Mi-young	South Korea
silver medal	Butsaracum Poskrisana; Supaporn Chuanprasertkit	Thailand
bronze medal	Tseng Su-fen; Chou Miao-lin	Chinese Taipei

The women's doubles competition at the 1998 Asian Games in Bangkok was held on 10 December 1998 at P.S. Bowling.

== Schedule ==
All times are Indochina Time (UTC+07:00)

Date	Time	Event
Thursday, 10 December 1998	16:00	Final

== Results ==
Rank	Team	Score
1st place, gold medalist(s)	South Korea (KOR); Lee Ji-yeon; Lee Mi-young	2583
2nd place, silver medalist(s)	Thailand (THA); Butsaracum Poskrisana; Supaporn Chuanprasertkit	2566
3rd place, bronze medalist(s)	Chinese Taipei (TPE); Tseng Su-fen; Chou Miao-lin	2509
4	Japan (JPN); Mari Kimura; Shima Washizuka	2479
5	Chinese Taipei (TPE); Huang Chiung-yao; Ku Hui-chin	2402
6	Philippines (PHI); Lizette Garcia; Liza Clutario	2388
7	Philippines (PHI); Arianne Cerdeña; Cecilia Yap	2377
8	Thailand (THA); Wannasiri Duangdee; Phetchara Kaewsuk	2374
9	Singapore (SIN); Jesmine Ho; Grace Young	2372
10	Japan (JPN); Ayano Katai; Nachimi Itakura	2356
10	Chinese Taipei (TPE); Kuo Shu-chen; Wang Yu-ling	2356
12	South Korea (KOR); Cha Mi-jung; Kim Hee-soon	2355
13	Malaysia (MAS); Lai Kin Ngoh; Shalin Zulkifli	2343
14	North Korea (PRK); Kang Yong-sun; O Kum-ok	2315
15	Singapore (SIN); Lee Poh Leng; Alice Tay	2311
16	Philippines (PHI); Bong Coo; Josephine Canare	2293
17	Singapore (SIN); Doreen Pang; Catherine Kang	2279
18	Malaysia (MAS); Low Poh Lian; Sarah Yap	2258
19	South Korea (KOR); Kim Yeau-jin; Kim Sook-young	2220
20	Malaysia (MAS); Sharon Low; Karen Lian	2212
21	Japan (JPN); Tomie Kawaguchi; Tomomi Shibata	2186
22	Thailand (THA); Penpaka Chaintrvong; Panumart Srisuratpipit	2087
23	Macau (MAC); Choi Kit Fan; Janthip Supachana	2005
