= Bowling at the 1998 Asian Games – Women's singles =

Women's singles at the 1998 Asian Games
- Venue: P.S. Bowling Bangkapi
- Date: 9 December 1998
- Competitors: 48 from 10 nations

Medalists
gold medal	Lee Ji-yeon	South Korea
silver medal	Lee Mi-young	South Korea
bronze medal	Sarah Yap	Malaysia

The women's singles competition at the 1998 Asian Games in Bangkok was held on 9 December 1998 at P. S. Bowling.

== Schedule ==
All times are Indochina Time (UTC+07:00)

Date	Time	Event
Wednesday, 9 December 1998	16:00	Final

== Results ==
Rank	Athlete	Score
1st place, gold medalist(s)	Lee Ji-yeon (KOR)	1330
2nd place, silver medalist(s)	Lee Mi-young (KOR)	1327
3	Cha Mi-jung (KOR)	1289
3rd place, bronze medalist(s)	Sarah Yap (MAS)	1281
5	Low Poh Lian (MAS)	1278
6	Tseng Su-fen (TPE)	1270
7	Chou Miao-lin (TPE)	1268
8	Ku Hui-chin (TPE)	1267
9	Kim Hee-soon (KOR)	1254
10	Kim Yeau-jin (KOR)	1225
11	Supaporn Chuanprasertkit (THA)	1210
12	Grace Young (SIN)	1209
13	Wannasiri Duangdee (THA)	1208
14	Huang Chiung-yao (TPE)	1207
15	Kuo Shu-chen (TPE)	1202
16	Lai Kin Ngoh (MAS)	1198
17	Jesmine Ho (SIN)	1193
18	Cecilia Yap (PHI)	1187
19	Wang Yu-ling (TPE)	1182
20	Karen Lian (MAS)	1177
21	Doreen Pang (SIN)	1159
22	Mari Kimura (JPN)	1155
23	Ayano Katai (JPN)	1153
24	Nachimi Itakura (JPN)	1151
25	Kim Yon-ok (PRK)	1142
26	Choi Kit Fan (MAC)	1140
26	Arianne Cerdeña (PHI)	1140
28	Butsaracum Poskrisana (THA)	1139
29	O Kum-ok (PRK)	1133
30	Josephine Canare (PHI)	1132
31	Phetchara Kaewsuk (THA)	1129
32	Tomomi Shibata (JPN)	1121
33	Sharon Low (MAS)	1118
34	Penpaka Chaintrvong (THA)	1113
35	Liza Clutario (PHI)	1101
35	Shalin Zulkifli (MAS)	1101
37	Kim Sook-young (KOR)	1094
38	Catherine Kang (SIN)	1089
39	Bong Coo (PHI)	1087
40	Shima Washizuka (JPN)	1084
41	Kang Yong-sun (PRK)	1077
42	Alice Tay (SIN)	1076
43	Tomie Kawaguchi (JPN)	1049
44	Lee Poh Leng (SIN)	1047
45	Lizette Garcia (PHI)	1018
46	Panumart Srisuratpipit (THA)	932
47	Janthip Supachana (MAC)	915
48	Shatarbalyn Gerlee (MGL)	796

- Sarah Yap was awarded bronze because of no three-medal sweep per country rule.
