= Bowling at the 1998 Asian Games – Men's masters =

Men's masters at the 1998 Asian Games
- Venue: P.S. Bowling Bangkapi
- Date: 13–14 December 1998
- Competitors: 16 from 8 nations

Medalists
gold medal	Hui Cheung Kwok	Hong Kong
silver medal	Wu Fu-lung	Chinese Taipei
bronze medal	Lin Han-chen	Chinese Taipei

The men's masters competition at the 1998 Asian Games in Bangkok was held on 13 and 14 December 1998 at P. S. Bowling.

The Masters event comprises the top 16 bowlers from the all-events category.

== Schedule ==
All times are Indochina Time (UTC+07:00)

Date	Time	Event
Sunday, 13 December 1998	13:00	1st block
Monday, 14 December 1998	10:00	2nd block
Monday, 14 December 1998	14:00	Finals

== Results ==
=== Preliminary ===
Rank	Athlete	Score
1	Wu Fu-lung (TPE)	3577
2	Hui Cheung Kwok (HKG)	3478
3	Lin Han-chen (TPE)	3476
4	Lu Hengchuan (CHN)	3441
5	Kritchawat Jampakao (THA)	3438
6	Kengo Tagata (JPN)	3391
7	Wang Yu-jen (TPE)	3343
8	Zhao Dongshan (CHN)	3334
9	Seo Kook (KOR)	3316
10	Cheng Chao-yu (TPE)	3295
11	Paulo Valdez (PHI)	3282
12	Chen Chun-fu (TPE)	3264
13	Prasert Panturat (THA)	3189
14	Sultan Al-Marzouqi (UAE)	3168
15	Virgilio Sablan (PHI)	3140
16	Kim Myung-jo (KOR)	2848

=== Stepladder finals ===
2nd/3rd place			1st/2nd place
			1	Wu Fu-lung (TPE)	200	186	386
2	Hui Cheung Kwok (HKG)	212	2	Hui Cheung Kwok (HKG)	213	246	459
3	Lin Han-chen (TPE)	166
