= Bowling at the 2002 Asian Games – Women's team =

Women's team of 5 at the 2002 Asian Games
- Venue: Homeplus Asiad Bowling Alley
- Date: 6–7 October 2002
- Competitors: 42 from 7 nations

Medalists
gold medal	South Korea; Kim Hee-soon, Cha Mi-jung, Kim Soo-kyung, Kim Yeau-jin, Kim Hyo-mi, Nam Bo-ra
silver medal	Philippines; Liza del Rosario, Irene Garcia, Liza Clutario, Josephine Canare, Cecilia Yap, Kathleen Ann Lopez
bronze medal	Chinese Taipei; Chou Miao-lin, Huang Chung-yao, Wang Yi-fen, Wang Yu-ling, Huang Tsai-feng, Chu Yu-chieh

The women's team of five competition at the 2002 Asian Games in Busan was held on 6 and 7 October 2002 at the Homeplus Asiad Bowling Alley.

== Schedule ==
All times are Korea Standard Time (UTC+09:00)

Date	Time	Event
Sunday, 6 October 2002	17:20	First block
Monday, 7 October 2002	14:00	Second block

== Results ==
Rank	Team	Game						Total
Rank	Team	1	2	3	4	5	6	Total
1st place, gold medalist(s)	South Korea (KOR)	956	1041	1092	1077	1156	950	6272
	Kim Hee-soon				231	236	189	656
	Cha Mi-jung	197	214	156	187	278	146	1178
	Kim Soo-kyung	163	202	253	236	226	211	1291
	Kim Yeau-jin	190	188	228				606
	Kim Hyo-mi	255	229	186	205	226	178	1279
	Nam Bo-ra	151	208	269	218	190	226	1262
2nd place, silver medalist(s)	Philippines (PHI)	949	967	1076	979	1048	1076	6095
	Liza del Rosario	168	217	223	215	219	232	1274
	Irene Garcia	189	180	191	190	216	191	1157
	Liza Clutario	213	234	201	221	195	236	1300
	Josephine Canare	176	147	214	160	183	190	1070
	Cecilia Yap	203	189	247	193	235	227	1294
3rd place, bronze medalist(s)	Chinese Taipei (TPE)	1051	932	1000	1058	1088	957	6086
	Chou Miao-lin	223	149	194	202	236	191	1195
	Huang Chung-yao	220	168	188	211	209	214	1210
	Wang Yi-fen	181	204	193	184	256	180	1198
	Wang Yu-ling	227	222	189	279	179	144	1240
	Huang Tsai-feng	200	189	236	182	208	228	1243
4	Japan (JPN)	1044	986	1052	986	1067	945	6080
	Tomomi Shibata				223	234	166	623
	Hiroko Shimizu	215	199	166				580
	Ayano Katai	208	186	225	176	204	186	1185
	Miyuki Kubotani	203	157	221	182	193	190	1146
	Nachimi Itakura	203	207	211	163	214	208	1206
	Mari Kimura	215	237	229	242	222	195	1340
5	Malaysia (MAS)	970	974	992	969	1010	984	5899
	Shalin Zulkifli	182	197	204	209	217	192	1201
	Lisa Kwan	166	181	184	195	197	184	1107
	Sarah Yap	186	212	198	170	202	194	1162
	Wendy Chai	181	203	180	189	211	181	1145
	Lai Kin Ngoh	255	181	226	206	183	233	1284
6	Singapore (SIN)	936	972	995	950	1037	980	5870
	Jennifer Tan	186	191	181	197	189	180	1124
	Alice Tay	168	237	243	191	179	234	1252
	Valerie Teo	198	168	181	191	230	188	1156
	Rena Teng	162	183	205	178	223	206	1157
	Jesmine Ho	222	193	185	193	216	172	1181
7	Hong Kong (HKG)	903	946	942	908	942	1024	5665
	Veronica Wong	176	225	170	156	183	194	1104
	Janet Lam	175	190	207	186	205	225	1188
	Jenny Ho	181	144	211	222	178	225	1161
	Choi Suk Yee	219	203	165	173	163	216	1139
	Vanessa Fung	152	184	189	171	213	164	1073
Individuals
	Cookie Lee (HKG)	215	179	199	151	192	196	1132
	Tomomi Shibata (JPN)	289	179	190				658
	Hiroko Shimizu (JPN)				194	154	248	596
	Kim Hee-soon (KOR)	240	194	156				590
	Kim Yeau-jin (KOR)				188	245	215	648
	Filomena Choi (MAC)	185	213	145	162	148	203	1056
	Sharon Chai (MAS)	180	169	158	207	192	205	1111
	Choijingiin Amardelger (MGL)	135	144	140	149	156	211	935
	Gantömöriin Solongo (MGL)	153	142	105	122	153	122	797
	Idersaikhany Tungalag (MGL)	102	87	143	115	119	107	673
	Kathleen Ann Lopez (PHI)	172	163	180	189	146	183	1033
	Yap Seok Kim (SIN)	197	214	218	191	160	213	1193
	Thunyaporn Chaintrvong (THA)	174	170	156	211	168	191	1070
	Wannasiri Duangdee (THA)	166	159	214	196	206	170	1111
	Donlaya Larpapharat (THA)	136	169	226	188	203	191	1113
	Chu Yu-chieh (TPE)	184	190	170	192	148	226	1110
