= Bowling at the 1998 Asian Games – Women's team =

Women's team of 5 at the 1998 Asian Games
- Venue: P.S. Bowling Bangkapi
- Date: 11–12 December 1998
- Competitors: 42 from 7 nations

Medalists
| gold medal | Chinese Taipei; Chou Miao-lin, Wang Yu-ling, Tseng Su-fen, Huang Chiung-yao, Kuo Shu-chen, Ku Hui-chin |
| silver medal | South Korea; Kim Yeau-jin, Kim Hee-soon, Lee Mi-young, Lee Ji-yeon, Kim Sook-young, Cha Mi-jung |
| bronze medal | Japan; Mari Kimura, Ayano Katai, Shima Washizuka, Tomomi Shibata, Tomie Kawaguchi, Nachimi Itakura |

The women's team of five competition at the 1998 Asian Games in Bangkok was held on 11 and 12 December 1998 at P.S. Bowling.

== Schedule ==
All times are Indochina Time (UTC+07:00)

| Date | Time | Event |
|---|---|---|
| Friday, 11 December 1998 | 16:00 | 1st block |
| Saturday, 12 December 1998 | 09:00 | 2nd block |

== Results ==
| Rank | Team | Score |
|---|---|---|
| 1st place, gold medalist(s) | Chinese Taipei (TPE); Chou Miao-lin; Wang Yu-ling; Tseng Su-fen; Huang Chiung-yao; Kuo Shu-chen; Ku Hui-chin | 6098 |
| 2nd place, silver medalist(s) | South Korea (KOR); Kim Yeau-jin; Kim Hee-soon; Lee Mi-young; Lee Ji-yeon; Kim Sook-young; Cha Mi-jung | 6045 |
| 3rd place, bronze medalist(s) | Japan (JPN); Mari Kimura; Ayano Katai; Shima Washizuka; Tomomi Shibata; Tomie Kawaguchi; Nachimi Itakura | 5613 |
| 4 | Malaysia (MAS); Low Poh Lian; Sharon Low; Shalin Zulkifli; Sarah Yap; Lai Kin Ngoh; Karen Lian | 5591 |
| 5 | Singapore (SIN); Jesmine Ho; Catherine Kang; Alice Tay; Grace Young; Doreen Pang; Lee Poh Leng | 5585 |
| 6 | Philippines (PHI); Liza Clutario; Lizette Garcia; Bong Coo; Josephine Canare; Cecilia Yap; Arianne Cerdeña | 5584 |
| 7 | Thailand (THA); Panumart Srisuratpipit; Wannasiri Duangdee; Phetchara Kaewsuk; Supaporn Chuanprasertkit; Penpaka Chaintrvong; Butsaracum Poskrisana | 5484 |
