= Bowling at the 1998 Asian Games – Women's masters =

Women's masters at the 1998 Asian Games
- Venue: P.S. Bowling Bangkapi
- Date: 13–14 December 1998
- Competitors: 16 from 7 nations

Medalists
gold medal	Chou Miao-lin	Chinese Taipei
silver medal	Jesmine Ho	Singapore
bronze medal	Huang Chiung-yao	Chinese Taipei

The women's masters competition at the 1998 Asian Games in Bangkok was held on 13 and 14 December 1998 at P. S. Bowling.

The Masters event comprises the top 16 bowlers from the all-events category.

== Schedule ==
All times are Indochina Time (UTC+07:00)

Date	Time	Event
Sunday, 13 December 1998	13:00	1st block
Monday, 14 December 1998	10:00	2nd block
Monday, 14 December 1998	13:00	Finals

== Results ==
=== Preliminary ===
Rank	Athlete	Score
1	Chou Miao-lin (TPE)	3624
2	Jesmine Ho (SIN)	3556
3	Huang Chiung-yao (TPE)	3464
4	Tseng Su-fen (TPE)	3419
5	Kuo Shu-chen (TPE)	3367
6	Cha Mi-jung (KOR)	3358
7	Lee Ji-yeon (KOR)	3349
8	Mari Kimura (JPN)	3306
9	Cecilia Yap (PHI)	3278
10	Lee Mi-young (KOR)	3258
11	Wang Yu-ling (TPE)	3257
12	Kim Hee-soon (KOR)	3242
13	Supaporn Chuanprasertkit (THA)	3237
14	Grace Young (SIN)	3157
15	Ku Hui-chin (TPE)	3047
16	Low Poh Lian (MAS)	2945

=== Stepladder finals ===
2nd/3rd place			1st/2nd place
			1	Chou Miao-lin (TPE)	177	205	382
2	Jesmine Ho (SIN)	183	2	Jesmine Ho (SIN)	179	157	336
3	Huang Chiung-yao (TPE)	180
