= Shaik Abdul Hameed =

Indian ten-pin bowling player

Sport
- Country: India
- Sport: Bowling
Medal record
Representing India
Men's Ten-pin Bowling
Commonwealth Tenpin Bowling Championships
Gold medal – first place	Stirling 2002	Singles
Gold medal – first place	Stirling 2002	Masters
Silver medal – second place	Stirling 2002	All Events

Shaik Abdul Hameed is an Indian ten-pin bowling player. In 2014, he won Thailand Tour Title of Asian Bowling Federation (ABF) in Thailand and became first Indian to win the title of ABF.

Shaik won India's first-ever medal in the sport during the Commonwealth Tenpin Bowling Championship 2002 in which he won gold medals in Singles and Masters and a silver medal in All Events.

In 2015, Shaik moved to Delhi High Court seeking direction to the government to nominate him for that year's Arjun Award.
