= Qatar at the 1998 Asian Games =

- IOC code: QAT
- NOC: Qatar Olympic Committee

in Bangkok
- Medals Ranked 18th: Gold 2 Silver 3 Bronze 3 Total 8

Asian Games appearances (overview)
- 1978; 1982; 1986; 1990; 1994; 1998; 2002; 2006; 2010; 2014; 2018; 2022; 2026

Qatar participated in the 1998 Asian Games held in Bangkok, Thailand from December 6, 1998 to December 20, 1998. Athletes from Qatar succeeded in winning two golds, three silvers and three bronzes, making total eight medals. Qatar finished eighteenth in a medal table.
