= United Arab Emirates at the 1998 Asian Games =

- IOC code: UAE
- NOC: United Arab Emirates National Olympic Committee

in Bangkok
- Medals Ranked 28th: Gold 0 Silver 1 Bronze 1 Total 2

Asian Games appearances (overview)
- 1978; 1982; 1986; 1990; 1994; 1998; 2002; 2006; 2010; 2014; 2018; 2022; 2026

United Arab Emirates participated in the 1998 Asian Games held in Bangkok, Thailand from 6 December 1998 to 20 December 1998. United Arab Emirates won a silver and a bronze medal and finished at 28th position in a medal table.
