= Saeed Al-Hajri (bowler) =

Qatari ten-pin bowler

Saeed Al Hajri is a Qatari ten-pin bowler. He finished in 16th position of the combined rankings at the 2006 AMF World Cup and won the 2008 Kingdom of Bahrain and Batelco International Bowling Championship.
