= Nachimi Itakura =

Japanese professional bowler (born 1975)

Personal information
- Native name: Kanji: 板倉奈智美; Spaced hiragana: いたくら なちみ
- Born: June 17, 1975 (age 51)
- Height: 1.60 m (5 ft 3 in)

Bowling Information
- Affiliation: JPBA
- License no.: 372, Class 36
- Rookie year: 2003
- Dominant hand: Right
- Wins: 7
- 300-games: 3

Nachimi Itakura (板倉 奈智美, Itakura Nachimi; born June 17, 1975) is a Japanese female professional ten-pin bowler. She is a member of the Japan Professional Bowling Association, license no. 372.

== Biography ==
At the age of 13, Itakura was interested in swimming. She was talented enough to compete in the Junior Olympics. After retiring from swimming, she took up bowling at her mother's suggestion. She was coached by Yoshikazu Nishida. During her high school years, she won three tournaments, including the 17th All-Japan High School Championship in 1993.

After graduating from high school, Itakura planned on working in the bowling business, starting off as an office lady at a bowling center. In 1997, at the age of 22 years, she gave up her job when she was selected as a member of the Japan national team. Between 1999 and 2000, Itakura competed in various professional and amateur tournaments. She competed in the NHK Cup Japan All-Star Championships. And, she became the first and only Japanese to win the AMF World Cup (2001).

Itakura became a professional in 2003, becoming the first bowler to enter the JPBA under a waiver, based on her success as an amateur, thereby bypassing the qualifying stages (usually, a bowler has to qualify via a series of difficult tests, which for many bowlers takes multiple years before they are successful.)

In 2011, Itakura-pro finished the JPBA season 24th in points (980), 19th in scoring average (206.21), and 24th in money with 784,000 yen.

== Major accomplishments ==
Amateur

- 1993 - 17th All-Japan High School Championship (winner)
- 1999 - 33rd Japan Invitational Bowling Championships (winner)
- 1999 - 12th All-Japan Ladies Tournament, Youth Division (winner)
- 2000 - 34th Japan Invitational Bowling Championships (winner)
- 2001 - 37th AMF World Cup (winner)

Professional

- 2003 - 35th All Japan Women's Pro Bowling Championship (winner)
- 2004 - 36th All Japan Women's Pro Bowling Championship (winner)
- 2005 - 27th Kansai Women's Open (winner)
- 2005 - Pro Bowling Ladies 新人戦 (winner)
- 2007 - BIGBOX Higashi Yamato Cup (winner)
- 2010 - 26th Rokko Queens (winner)

DHC

- 2006 DHC Ladies Bowling Tour 2005/2006 - 5th-leg (winner)

P★League

- Tournament 4 - 2nd place
