= Philippines at the 1998 Asian Games =

- IOC code: PHI
- NOC: Philippine Olympic Committee
- Website: www.olympic.ph (in English)

in Bangkok
- Medals Ranked 21st: Gold 1 Silver 5 Bronze 12 Total 18

Asian Games appearances (overview)
- 1951; 1954; 1958; 1962; 1966; 1970; 1974; 1978; 1982; 1986; 1990; 1994; 1998; 2002; 2006; 2010; 2014; 2018; 2022; 2026

The Philippines participated in the 1998 Asian Games held in Bangkok, Thailand from December 6 to December 20, 1998. Ranked 21st with one gold medal, five silver medals, and 12 bronze medals with a total of 18 over-all medals.

== Asian Games Performance ==
It was a dismal harvest compared to four years ago. Billiards and Snooker players Romeo Villanueva and Gandy Valle captured the 9-ball doubles title to give the Philippines its first taste of gold. The country's first silver was earned by reigning world cudgel champion and Jakarta SEA games double gold medalist Mark Robert Rosales in the 3-event changquan. Rolly Chulhang settled for a silver in the men's 52-kg and below finals in sanshou for Wushu's second silver medal.

The Philippine Centennial team defeated Kazakhstan, 73-68, to salvage the bronze medal in basketball.

== Medalists ==
The following Philippine competitors won medals at the Games.

=== Gold ===
No.	Medal	Name	Sport	Event
1	Gold	Gandy Valle; Romeo Villanueva	Cue sports	Men's 9-Ball Doubles

=== Silver ===
No.	Medal	Name	Sport	Event
1	Silver	Gerald Rosales	Golf	Men's Individual
2	Silver	Cookie LaO; Rhey Luna; Angelo Que	Golf	Men's Team
3	Silver	Donald Geisler	Taekwondo	Men's Featherweight -64kg
4	Silver	Mark Robert Rosales	Wushu	Men's Taolu Changquan
5	Silver	Rolly Chulhang	Wushu	Men's Sanda 52kg

=== Bronze ===
No.	Medal	Name	Sport	Event
1	Bronze	Johnny Abarrientos; Marlou Aquino; Allan Caidic; Kenneth Duremdes; Dennis Espino; E. J. Feihl; Jojo Lastimosa; Jun Limpot; Vergel Meneses; Alvin Patrimonio; Olsen Racela; Andy Seigle	Basketball	Men's Team
2	Bronze	Virgilio Sablan	Bowling	Men's Singles
3	Bronze	Eric Canoy	Boxing	Men's Featherweight 57kg
4	Bronze	Victor Espiritu	Cycling	Men's Road Race
5	Bronze	Dorothy Delasin; Ria Quiazon; Jennifer Rosales	Golf	Women's Team
6	Bronze	Raymond Papa	Swimming	Men's 100m Backstroke
7	Bronze	Raymond Papa	Swimming	Men's 200m Backstroke
8	Bronze	Rodolfo Abratique	Taekwondo	Men's Flyweight -54kg
9	Bronze	Nelia Sy	Taekwondo	Women's Lightweight -60kg
10	Bronze	Margarita Bonifacio	Taekwondo	Women's Heavyweight +70kg
11	Bronze	Roger Chulhang	Wushu	Men's Sanda 56kg
12	Bronze	Jerome Lumabas	Wushu	Men's Sanda 70kg

=== Multiple ===
Name	Sport	Gold	Silver	Bronze	Total
Gerald Rosales	Golf	0	2	0	2
Raymond Papa	Swimming	0	0	2	2

== Medal summary ==
=== Medal by sports ===
Sport	Gold	Silver	Bronze	Total
Cue sports	1	0	0	1
Wushu	0	2	2	4
Golf	0	2	1	3
Taekwondo	0	1	3	4
Swimming	0	0	2	2
Basketball	0	0	1	1
Bowling	0	0	1	1
Boxing	0	0	1	1
Cycling	0	0	1	1
Totals (9 entries)	1	5	12	18
