= Boxing at the 2000 Summer Olympics – Light heavyweight =

Boxing competitions

Men's light heavyweight boxing at the Games of the XXVII Olympiad
- Venue: Sydney Convention and Exhibition Centre
- Date: 20 September to 1 October 2000
- Competitors: 28 from 28 nations

Medalists
1st place, gold medalist(s)		Aleksandr Lebziak	Russia
2nd place, silver medalist(s)		Rudolf Kraj	Czech Republic
3rd place, bronze medalist(s)		Andriy Fedchuk	Ukraine
3rd place, bronze medalist(s)		Sergey Mihaylov	Uzbekistan

The men's light heavyweight boxing competition at the 2000 Olympic Games in Sydney was held from 20 September to 1 October at the Sydney Convention and Exhibition Centre.

31-year-old Aleksandr Lebziak of Russia won gold in his third Olympic appearance.

== Competition format ==
Like all Olympic boxing events, the competition was a straight single-elimination tournament. This event consisted of 28 boxers who have qualified for the competition through various qualifying tournaments held in 1999 and 2000. The competition began with a preliminary round on 20 September, where the number of competitors was reduced to 16, and concluded with the final on 1 October. As there were fewer than 32 boxers in the competition, a number of boxers received a bye through the preliminary round. Both semi-final losers were awarded bronze medals.

All bouts consisted of four rounds of two minutes each, with one-minute breaks between rounds. Punches scored only if the white area on the front of the glove made full contact with the front of the head or torso of the opponent. Five judges scored each bout; three of the judges had to signal a scoring punch within one second for the punch to score. The winner of the bout was the boxer who scored the most valid punches by the end of the bout.

== Competitors ==
Name	Country
Tory Amos-Ross	Canada
Jegbefumere Albert	Nigeria
Olanda Anderson	United States
Rudolf Kraj	Czech Republic
Andriy Fedchuk	Ukraine
Azize Raguig	Morocco
Charles Adamu	Ghana
Courtney Fry	Great Britain
Gurcharan Singh	India
Choi Ki-soo	South Korea
Danie Venter	South Africa
Ihab Al-Youssef	Syria
Giacobbe Fragomeni	Italy
Isael Álvarez	Cuba
Olzhas Orazaliyev	Kazakhstan
Hugo Garay	Argentina
Claudio Rîșco	Romania
Sergey Mihaylov	Uzbekistan
Ali Ismayilov	Azerbaijan
Emil Krastev	Bulgaria
Shawn Terry Cox	Barbados
John Dovi	France
Alexey Katulievsky	Kyrgyzstan
George Olwande Odindo	Kenya
Laudelino Barros	Brazil
Danny Green	Australia
Aleksandr Lebziak	Russia
Djibril Fall	Senegal

== Schedule ==
All times are Australian Time (UTC+10)

Date	Time	Round
Wednesday, September 20, 2000	13:00 & 19:30	Round of 32
Sunday, September 24, 2000	13:00 & 19:30	Round of 16
Wednesday, September 27, 2000	13:00 & 19:30	Quarterfinals
Friday, September 29, 2000	19:30	Semifinals
Sunday, October 1, 2000	13:00	Final Bout

== Results ==
Round of 32
Andriy Fedchuk (UKR)	RSC
Azize Raguig (MAR)
Charles Adamu (GHA)	16
Courtney Fry (GBR)	3
Gurcharan Singh (IND)	11
Choi Ki-Soo (KOR)	9
Danie Venter (RSA)	12
Ihab El-Youssef (SYR)	9
Giacobbe Fragomeni (ITA)
Isael Álvarez (CUB)	RSC
Olzhas Orazaliyev (KAZ)	RSC
Hugo Garay (ARG)
Claudio Rîșco (ROM)	6
Sergey Mihaylov (UZB)	15
Ali Ismayilov (AZE)	14
Emil Krastev (BUL)	9
Shawn Terry Cox (BAR)	10
John Dovi (FRA)	14
Aleksey Katulevsky (KGZ)	11
George Olwande Odindo (KEN)	2
Laudelino Barros (BRA)
Danny Green (AUS)	RSC
Aleksandr Lebziak (RUS)	RSC
Djibril Fall (SEN)

Round of 16
Troy Amos-Ross (CAN)
Jegbefumere Albert (NGR)	RSC
Olanda Anderson (USA)	12
Rudolf Kraj (CZE)	13
Andriy Fedchuk (UKR)	13
Charles Adamu (GHA)	5
Gurcharan Singh (IND)	RSC
Danie Venter (RSA)
Isael Álvarez (CUB)
Olzhas Orazaliyev (KAZ)	RSC
Sergey Mihaylov (UZB)	23
Ali Ismayilov (AZE)	18
John Dovi (FRA)	RSC
Alexey Katulievsky (KGZ)
Danny Green (AUS)
Aleksandr Lebziak (RUS)	RSC

Quarter-finals
Jegbefumere Albert (NGR)	7
Rudolf Kraj (CZE)	8
Andriy Fedchuk (UKR)	12^{+}
Gurcharan Singh (IND)	12
Olzhas Orazaliyev (KAZ)
Sergey Mihaylov (UZB)	RSC
John Dovi (FRA)	11
Aleksandr Lebziak (RUS)	13

Semi-finals
Rudolf Kraj (CZE)	11
Andriy Fedchuk (UKR)	7
Sergey Mihaylov (UZB)
Aleksandr Lebziak (RUS)	RSC

Final
Rudolf Kraj (CZE)	6
Aleksandr Lebziak (RUS)	20
