= Aleksandr Lebziak =

Russian boxer (born 1969)

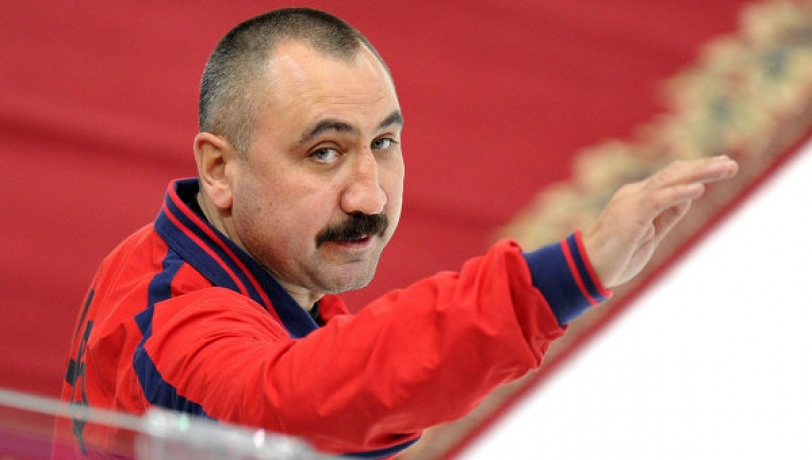

Personal information
- Full name: Александр Борисович Лебзяк
- Nationality: Russia
- Born: 15 April 1969 (age 57) Donetsk, Ukrainian SSR, Soviet Union
- Height: 1.88 m (6 ft 2 in)
- Weight: 81 kg (179 lb)

Sport
- Sport: Boxing
- Weight class: Light Heavyweight
- Club: CSKA Moskva, Moskva
Medal record
Olympic Games
Gold medal – first place	2000 Sydney	Light Heavyweight
World Amateur Championships
Gold medal – first place	1997 Budapest	Light Heavyweight
Silver medal – second place	1991 Sydney	Middleweight
European Amateur Championships
Gold medal – first place	1998 Minsk	Light Heavyweight
Gold medal – first place	2000 Tampere	Light Heavyweight
Silver medal – second place	1993 Bursa	Middleweight
Bronze medal – third place	1991 Gothenburg	Middleweight
Bronze medal – third place	1996 Vejle	Middleweight

Aleksandr Borisovich Lebziak (Russian: Александр Борисович Лебзяк, born 15 April 1969) is a Russian boxer, a three-time Olympian who won the Gold medal in the men's Light Heavyweight (81 kg) category at the 2000 Summer Olympics in Sydney. He beat Rudolf Kraj in the final.

Lebziak also won the World Amateur Boxing Championships in 1997. At the 1991 World Amateur Championships he won a silver medal in the Middleweight (75 kg) category. He also triumphed at the 2000 European Amateur Boxing Championships in Tampere, Finland.

== Biography ==
Aleksandr Lebziak was born on April 15, 1969, in Donetsk, Ukraine. In 1999 he graduated from the Moscow State Academy of Physical Culture. In 1980 he started boxing. He has been training at CSKA since 1995.

== Highlights ==
- 1987 Junior World Champion at Light Middleweight (Havana, Cuba)
- 1990 Middleweight Bronze Medalist at Goodwill Games in Seattle, United States. Results were:
  - Defeated Ray Downey (Canada) points
  - Lost to Torsten Schmitz (Germany) points
- 1991 Lost to Sven Ottke (Germany) as a Middleweight at European Championships in Gothenburg, Sweden
- 1991 2nd place at Middleweight at World Championships in Sydney, Australia. Results were:
  - Defeated Robert Buda (Poland) TKO 2
  - Defeated Sven Ottke (Germany) points
  - Defeated Ramon Garbey (Cuba) points
  - Lost to Tommaso Russo (Italy) points
- Represented the Unified Team at the 1992 Barcelona Olympics as a Middleweight. Results were:
  - Defeated Justann Crawford (Australia) RSC 3 (1:56)
  - Lost to Chris Byrd (United States) 7–16
- 1993 Lost to Sven Ottke (Germany) as a Middleweight at World Championships in Tampere, Finland.
- 1993 2nd place at Middleweight in European Championships in Bursa, Turkey. Results were:
  - Defeated Mkhitar Vanesian (Armenia) points
  - Defeated Akin Kuloglu (Turkey) points
  - Lost to Dirk Eigenbrodt (Germany) points
- 1994 Bronze Medalist at Middleweight at Goodwill Games in St. Petersburg, Russia. Results were:
  - Defeated Vitaly Kopitko (Ukraine) points
  - Lost to Ariel Hernandez (Cuba) points
- 1996 3rd place in European Championships at Middleweight, held in Vejle, Denmark. Results were:
  - Defeated Vitaly Kopitko (Ukraine) points
  - Defeated Raffaele Bergamasco (Italy) points
  - Defeated Akaki Kakauridze (Georgia) points
  - Lost to Zsolt Erdei (Hungary) points
- 1996 Represented Russia at 1996 Olympic Games in Atlanta, as a Middleweight. Results were:
  - Defeated Rowan Donaldson (Jamaica) 20–4
  - Defeated Justann Crawford (Australia) RSC 3 (0:34)
  - Lost to Ariel Hernandez (Cuba) 8–15
- 1997 World Champion at Light Heavyweight in competition held in Budapest, Hungary. Results were:
  - Defeated Igor Dzagouev (Georgia) forfeit
  - Defeated Tomasz Borowski (Poland) points
  - Defeated Stephen Kirk (Ireland) KO 2
  - Defeated Frederic Serrat (France) points
- 1998 European Champion at Light Heavyweight in competition held in Minsk, Belarus. Results were:
  - Defeated Gyorgy Hidvegi (Hungary) TKO 3
  - Defeated Thorsten Bengtson (Germany) points
  - Defeated Tomasz Adamek (Poland) points
  - Defeated Courtney Fry (England) TKO 1
- 2000 European Champion at Light Heavyweight in competition held in Tampere, Finland. Results were:
  - Defeated Yildirim Tarhan (Turkey) points
  - Defeated Milorad Gajovic (Yugoslavia) points
  - Defeated Claudio Rasco (Romania) points
- 2000 Olympic Gold Medalist at Light Heavyweight in competition held in Sydney, Australia. Results were:
  - Defeated El Hadji Djibril (Senegal) RSC 3
  - Defeated Danny Green (Australia) RSC 4
  - Defeated John Dovi (France) 13–11
  - Defeated Sergey Mihaylov (Uzbekistan) RSC 1
  - Defeated Rudolf Kraj (Czech Republic) 20–6

== Pro career ==
Lebziak turned pro in 2001, fighting only one fight and retiring with a record of 1–0–0.

== Awards and honours ==
- 1995 – Order of Honour
- 1997 – Medal "In Commemoration of the 850th Anniversary of Moscow"
- 1999 – Order "For Merit to the Fatherland", II degree
- 2001 – Order "For Merit to the Fatherland", IV degree
- 2009 – Order of Mirotvorets
- 2013 – Honoured Worker of Physical Culture of the Russian Federation
