= 1998 European Amateur Boxing Championships =

Boxing competitions

- Host city: Minsk
- Country: Belarus
- Nations: 38
- Athletes: 180
- Dates: 17–24 May

The Men's 1998 European Amateur Boxing Championships were held in Minsk, Belarus from May 17 to May 24. The 32nd edition of the bi-annual competition, in which 180 fighters from 38 countries participated this time, was organised by the European governing body for amateur boxing, EABA.

== Medal winners ==
Event	Gold	Silver	Bronze
Light Flyweight (– 48 kilograms)	Sergey Kazakov; Russia	Ivanas Stapovičius; Lithuania	Pál Lakatos; Hungary Oleg Kiryukhin; Ukraine
Flyweight (– 51 kilograms)	Vladimir Sidorenko; Ukraine	Ilfat Razyapov; Russia	Vachtang Darchinyan; Armenia (Georgia (country)) Ramaz Gazashvili; Georgia
Bantamweight (– 54 kilograms)	Sergey Danilchenko; Ukraine	Marian Alexandru; Romania	Raimkul Malakhbekov; Russia Reidar Walstad; Norway
Featherweight (– 57 kilograms)	Ramaz Paliani; Turkey	Artyom Simonyan; Armenia	Sayan Sanchat; Russia János Nagy; Hungary
Lightweight (– 60 kilograms)	Kay Huste; Germany	(Georgia (country)) Koba Gogoladze; Georgia	Tigran Ouzlian; Greece Artur Gevorgyan; Armenia
Light Welterweight (– 63.5 kilograms)	Dorel Simion; Romania	Nurhan Süleymanoglu; Turkey	Dimitri Pavluschenko; Russia Sergei Bykovski; Belarus
Welterweight (– 67 kilograms)	Oleg Saitov; Russia	Sergei Dzinziryuk; Ukraine	Marian Simion; Romania Vadim Mezga; Belarus
Light Middleweight (– 71 kilograms)	Frédéric Esther; France	Ercüment Aslan; Turkey	Christopher Bessey; England Adrian Diaconu; Romania
Middleweight (– 75 kilograms)	Zsolt Erdei; Hungary	(Republic of Ireland) Brian Magee; Ireland	Jean-Paul Mendy; France Dimitri Strelchinin; Russia
Light Heavyweight (– 81 kilograms)	Aleksandr Lebziak; Russia	Courtney Fry; England	Tomasz Adamek; Poland Claudiu Rasko; Romania
Heavyweight (– 91 kilograms)	Giacobbe Fragomeni; Italy	Sergei Dytchkov; Belarus	Evgeny Makarenko; Russia Kwamena Turkson; Sweden
Super Heavyweight (+ 91 kilograms)	Alexei Lezin; Russia	Vladimir Lazebnik; Ukraine	Sinan Samil Sam; Turkey Tofik Basisi; Israel

== MEDAL TABLE ==
Rank	Nation	Gold	Silver	Bronze	Total
1	Russia (RUS)	4	1	5	10
2	Ukraine (UKR)	2	2	1	5
3	Turkey (TUR)	1	2	1	4
4	Romania (ROM)	1	1	3	5
5	Hungary (HUN)	1	0	2	3
6	France (FRA)	1	0	1	2
7	Germany (GER)	1	0	0	1
7	Italy (ITA)	1	0	0	1
9	Armenia (ARM)	0	1	2	3
9	Belarus (BLR)	0	1	2	3
11	England (ENG)	0	1	1	2
11	Georgia (GEO)	0	1	1	2
13	Ireland (IRL)	0	1	0	1
13	Lithuania (LTU)	0	1	0	1
15	Greece (GRE)	0	0	1	1
15	Israel (ISR)	0	0	1	1
15	Norway (NOR)	0	0	1	1
15	Poland (POL)	0	0	1	1
15	Sweden (SWE)	0	0	1	1
Totals (19 entries)		12	12	24	48
