= 1997 World Amateur Boxing Championships =

Boxing competitions

1997 AIBA World Boxing Championships
- Location: Budapest, Hungary
- Start date: October 18, 1997
- End date: October 26, 1997

The Men's 1997 World Amateur Boxing Championships were held in Budapest, Hungary from October 18 to October 26. The ninth edition of this competition, a year after the Summer Olympics in Atlanta, Georgia, was organised by the world governing body for amateur boxing AIBA. The tournament saw the increase in the age limit of boxers from (32) years to (35) years of age.

== Medal table ==
| Rank | Nation | Gold | Silver | Bronze | Total |
|---|---|---|---|---|---|
| 1 | Cuba (CUB) | 4 | 3 | 3 | 10 |
| 2 | Russia (RUS) | 4 | 2 | 1 | 7 |
| 3 | Hungary (HUN) | 2 | 0 | 0 | 2 |
| 4 | Romania (ROU) | 1 | 0 | 2 | 3 |
| 5 | Georgia (GEO) | 1 | 0 | 1 | 2 |
| 6 | Germany (GER) | 0 | 2 | 1 | 3 |
| 7 | France (FRA) | 0 | 1 | 1 | 2 |
| 7 | Kazakhstan (KAZ) | 0 | 1 | 1 | 2 |
| 9 | Mongolia (MGL) | 0 | 1 | 0 | 1 |
| 9 | Philippines (PHI) | 0 | 1 | 0 | 1 |
| 9 | Ukraine (UKR) | 0 | 1 | 0 | 1 |
| 12 | Italy (ITA) | 0 | 0 | 2 | 2 |
| 12 | Turkey (TUR) | 0 | 0 | 2 | 2 |
| 14 | Argentina (ARG) | 0 | 0 | 1 | 1 |
| 14 | Armenia (ARM) | 0 | 0 | 1 | 1 |
| 14 | Belarus (BLR) | 0 | 0 | 1 | 1 |
| 14 | Bulgaria (BUL) | 0 | 0 | 1 | 1 |
| 14 | Czech Republic (CZE) | 0 | 0 | 1 | 1 |
| 14 | Denmark (DEN) | 0 | 0 | 1 | 1 |
| 14 | Ireland (IRL) | 0 | 0 | 1 | 1 |
| 14 | Slovakia (SVK) | 0 | 0 | 1 | 1 |
| 14 | South Korea (KOR) | 0 | 0 | 1 | 1 |
| 14 | Sweden (SWE) | 0 | 0 | 1 | 1 |
| Totals (23 entries) | | 12 | 12 | 24 | 48 |

== Medal winners ==
| Event | Gold | Silver | Bronze |
|---|---|---|---|
| Light Flyweight (– 48 kilograms) | Maikro Romero; Cuba | Roel Velasco; Philippines | Rudolf Dydi; Slovakia Daniel Petrov; Bulgaria |
| Flyweight (– 51 kilograms) | Manuel Mantilla; Cuba | Ilfat Razyapov; Russia | Omar Andrés Narváez; Argentina Bulat Jumadilov; Kazakhstan |
| Bantamweight (– 54 kilograms) | Raimkul Malakhbekov; Russia | Waldemar Font; Cuba | Soner Karagöz; Turkey Aram Ramazyan; Armenia |
| Featherweight (– 57 kilograms) | István Kovács; Hungary | Falk Huste; Germany | Sayan Sanszat; Russia Rusinelson Hardy; Cuba |
| Lightweight (– 60 kilograms) | Aleksander Maletin; Russia | Tümentsetsegiin Üitümen; Mongolia | (Georgia (country)) Koba Gogoladze; Georgia Shin Eun-Chul; South Korea |
| Light Welterweight (– 63,5 kilograms) | Dorel Simion; Romania | Paata Gvasalia; Russia | Tonton Semakala; Sweden Lukáš Konecný; Czech Republic |
| Welterweight (– 67 kilograms) | Oleg Saitov; Russia | Serhiy Dzyndzyruk; Ukraine | Juan Hernández Sierra; Cuba Marian Simion; Romania |
| Light Middleweight (– 71 kilograms) | Alfredo Duvergel; Cuba | Yermakhan Ibraimov; Kazakhstan | Ercüment Aslan; Turkey Adrian Diaconu; Romania |
| Middleweight (– 75 kilograms) | Zsolt Erdei; Hungary | Ariel Hernández; Cuba | Dirk Eigenbrodt; Germany Jean-Paul Mendy; France |
| Light Heavyweight (– 81 kilograms) | Aleksandr Lebziak; Russia | Frédéric Serrat; France | Isael Álvarez; Cuba (Republic of Ireland) Stephen Kirk; Ireland |
| Heavyweight (– 91 kilograms) | Félix Savón; Cuba | Mike Hanke; Germany | Giacobbe Fragomeni; Italy; Tue Bjørn Thomsen; Denmark |
| Super Heavyweight (+ 91 kilograms) | (Georgia (country)) Georgi Kandelaki; Georgia | Alexis Rubalcaba; Cuba | Sergei Liakhovich; Belarus Paolo Vidoz; Italy |
