= Andriy Fedchuk =

Ukrainian boxer (1980–2009)

Personal information
- Full name: Андрій Васильович Федчук
- Nationality: Ukraine
- Born: January 12, 1980 Kolomyia, Ivano-Frankivsk, Ukrainian SSR, Soviet Union
- Died: November 15, 2009 (aged 29) Kolomyia, Ivano-Frankivsk, Ukraine
- Height: 1.84 m (6 ft 0 in)
- Weight: 81 kg (179 lb)

Sport
- Sport: Boxing
- Weight class: Light Heavyweight
- Club: Dynamo, Ukraina Kolomyya
Medal record
Olympic Games
Bronze medal – third place	2000 Sydney	Light Heavyweight
European Amateur Championships
Bronze medal – third place	2004 Pula	Light Heavyweight
World Junior Boxing Championships
Bronze medal – third place	1998 Buenos Aires	Middleweight

Andriy Vasylyovych Fedchuk (Ukrainian: Андрій Васильович Федчук; January 12, 1980 – November 15, 2009), was a boxer from Ukraine, who won the bronze medal in the light heavyweight division (– 81 kg) at the 2000 Summer Olympics in Sydney, Australia. In the semifinals he was defeated by eventual runner-up Rudolf Kraj from the Czech Republic. He also represented his native country at the 2004 Summer Olympics in Athens, Greece, after having won the bronze medal in the same year at the 2004 European Amateur Boxing Championships in Pula, Croatia. He was born in Kolomyia, Ivano-Frankivsk Oblast and, on November 15, 2009, died in a traffic collision near Kolomyia.

== Olympic results ==
- Defeated Azziz Raguig (Morocco) RSC 3
- Defeated Charles Adamu (Ghana) 13–5
- Defeated Gurcharan Singh (India) 12-12 (Fedchuck won the decision)
- Lost to Rudolf Kraj (Czech Republic) 7-11
