= Boxing at the 1998 Goodwill Games =

- Location: (United States) New York City
- Start date: 27 July
- End date: 1 August

The boxing competition at the 1998 Goodwill Games was held in New York City, United States from 27 July to 1 August.

== Medal winners ==
Event	Gold	Silver	Bronze
Light Flyweight (– 48 kilograms)	Maikro Romero; Cuba	Alexandr Nalbadyan; Russia	Roel Velasco; Philippines Sergei Kazakov; Russia
Flyweight (– 51 kilograms)	Ersin Zheylelov; Kazakhstan	Roberto Benite; United States	John Medina; United States Vakhtang Darchinyan; Armenia
Bantamweight (– 54 kilograms)	Timur Tulyakov; Uzbekistan	Waldemar Font; Cuba	Antonio Rodriguez; United States Jose Santa Cruz; United States
Featherweight (– 57 kilograms)	Teaunce Shepherd; United States	Andrey Kozlovskiy; Russia	Alexandr Mitishev; Russia Michael Evans; United States
Lightweight (– 60 kilograms)	Mario Kindelán; Cuba	Jacob Hudson; United States	Alexandr Leonov; Russia Alexandr Maletin; Russia
Light Welterweight (– 63,5 kilograms)	Ricardo Williams; United States	Ebo Elder; United States	Paata Gvasalia; Russia Dmitriy Pavluchenkov; Russia
Welterweight (– 67 kilograms)	Andrey Mishin; Russia	Larry Mosley; United States	Miguel Espino; United States Roberto Guerra; Cuba
Light Middleweight (– 71 kilograms)	Juan Hernandez Sierra; Cuba	Gaydarbek Gaydarbekov; Russia	Jermain Taylor; United States Darnell Wilson; United States
Middleweight (– 75 kilograms)	Ariel Hernandez; Cuba	Jean-Paul Mendy; France	Dmitriy Strelchinin; Russia Dilshod Yarbekov; Uzbekistan
Light Heavyweight (– 81 kilograms)	Isael Alvarez; Cuba	Olanda Anderson; United States	Evgeniy Makarenko; Russia Denis Lebedev; Russia
Heavyweight (– 91 kilograms)	Felix Savon; Cuba	DaVarryll Williamson; United States	Igor Kshinin; Russia Malcolm Tann; United States
Super Heavyweight (+ 91 kilograms)	Paolo Vidoz; Italy	Alexis Rubalcaba; Cuba	Dmitriy Diagilev; Russia Dominick Guinn; United States
