= Olzhas =

Olzhas or Oljas (Kazakh: Олжас) is a masculine given name. Notable people with the name include:

- Oljas Bektenov (born 1980), Prime Minister of Kazakhstan
- Olzhas Kerimzhanov (born 1989), Kazakh football defender
- Olzhas Orazaliyev (born 1980), Kazakh amateur boxer
- Olzhas Sattibayev (born 1988), Kazakh boxer
- Olzhas Suleimenov, Kazakh poet, politician, and activist
