= Shivute =

Shivute is a surname. Notable people with the surname include:

- Eliphas Shivute (born 1979), Namibian retired footballer
- Peter Shivute (born 1963), Namibian judge
- Sackey Shivute (born 1965), Namibian boxer
