= Sergey Mihaylov =

Uzbek boxer (born 1976)

Personal information
- Full name: Сергей Михайлов
- Nationality: Uzbekistan
- Born: March 5, 1976 (age 50)
- Height: 1.87 m (6 ft 2 in)
- Weight: 91 kg (201 lb)

Sport
- Sport: Boxing
- Weight class: Light heavyweight, Heavyweight
Medal record
Olympic Games
Bronze medal – third place	2000 Sydney	Light heavyweight
Asian Games
Gold medal – first place	1998 Bangkok	Light heavyweight
Gold medal – first place	2002 Busan	Heavyweight
Asian Championships
Bronze medal – third place	2002 Seremban	Heavyweight

Sergey Mihaylov (born March 5, 1976) is an Uzbek boxer, who competed in the light heavyweight (81 kg) division at the 2000 Summer Olympics and won the bronze medal.

== Career ==
He won the Asian light heavy title in 1998.

Olympic Results 2000

- Defeated Claudiu Rasco (Romania) 15–6
- Defeated Ali Ismailov (Azerbaijan) 23–18
- Defeated Olzhas Orazaliev (Kazakhstan) RSC 4
- Lost to Alexander Lebziak (Russia) RSC 1

He went up to 201 lbs and won the Asian title in 2002.

At the 2003 world championships he lost in the quarterfinals (30:35) to Steffen Kretschmann.
