= Boxing at the 1998 Asian Games – Men's 81 kg =

Boxing competitions

Men's 81 kg at the 1998 Asian Games
- Venue: Land Sports Complex
- Date: 9–18 December 1998
- Competitors: 13 from 13 nations

Medalists
gold medal	Sergey Mihaylov	Uzbekistan
silver medal	Lee Seung-bae	South Korea
bronze medal	Gurcharan Singh	India
bronze medal	Shaukat Ali	Pakistan

The men's light heavyweight boxing competition at the 1998 Asian Games in Bangkok, Thailand was held from 9 to 18 December at the Land Sports Complex.

Like all Asian Games boxing events, the competition was a straight single-elimination tournament. This event consisted of 13 boxers. The competition began with the round of 16 on 9 December, where the number of competitors was reduced to 8, and concluded with the final on 18 December. As there were fewer than 16 boxers in the competition, a number of boxers received a bye through the preliminary round. Both semi-final losers were awarded bronze medals.

All bouts consisted of five three-minute rounds. The boxers receive points for every successful punch they land on their opponent's head or upper body. The boxer with the most points at the end of the bouts wins. If a boxer is knocked to the ground and cannot get up before the referee counts to 10 then the bout is over and the opponent wins.

== Schedule ==
All times are Indochina Time (UTC+07:00)

Date	Time	Event
Wednesday, 9 December 1998	14:00	Round of 16
Friday, 11 December 1998	14:00	Quarterfinals
Tuesday, 15 December 1998	14:00	Semifinals
Friday, 18 December 1998	14:00	Final

== Results ==
Legend

- RSCH — Won by referee stop contest head blow
- RSCI — Won by referee stop contest injury
- RSCO — Won by referee stop contest outclassed

Round of 16
Gurcharan Singh (IND)	RSCO
Basel Al-Hindawi (JOR)
Lee Seung-bae (KOR)	17
Emil Boylo (KGZ)	4
Ali Darvish (IRI)	20
Ihab Al-Yousef (SYR)	13
Shaukat Ali (PAK)	RSCI
Lo Shang-che (TPE)
Talgat Dossanov (KAZ)	RSCI
Munir Abukeshek (PLE)

Quarterfinals
Sergey Mihaylov (UZB)	RSCH
Somsak Chantraporn (THA)
Bisal Masri (LIB)
Gurcharan Singh (IND)	RSCO
Lee Seung-bae (KOR)	18
Ali Darvish (IRI)	7
Shaukat Ali (PAK)	14
Talgat Dossanov (KAZ)	10

Semifinals
Sergey Mihaylov (UZB)	13
Gurcharan Singh (IND)	5
Lee Seung-bae (KOR)	12
Shaukat Ali (PAK)	3

Final
Sergey Mihaylov (UZB)	9
Lee Seung-bae (KOR)	5
