= Justann Crawford =

Australian boxer (born 1973)

Personal information
- Born: 24 July 1973 (age 53) Burnie Australia
- Weight: Light heavyweight

Boxing career
- Stance: Orthodox

Boxing record
- Total fights: 123
- Wins: 98
- Win by KO: 48
- Losses: 25
- Draws: 0

Justann John Crawford (born 24 July 1973) is a retired indigenous Australian Olympic boxer. Justann earned 9 international gold medals and represented Australia at the 1992, 1996 Olympic Games and 1994 Commonwealth Games. He also held 9 Australian boxing titles mainly in the middleweight division, or in the light heavyweight division.

Justann Crawford's boxing career was cut short because of an eye injury and mild brain damage in 1998 at age 25. However, he was one of the first few indigenous Australians to compete in the Olympic Games.

His commitment to boxing has put him in the Aboriginal and Islander Sports Hall of Fame to recognise his multiple international titles in representing Australia as an aboriginal.

Following his retirement from the ring, Crawford became a personal boxing trainer at Balmain Fitness.

== Early life ==
Justann Crawford was born and raised in Tasmania, Australia. He attended Parklands High School in Burnie, Cosgrove High School in Hobart for the duration of Year 9 and 10, and studied boxing at Elizabeth College for Year 11 and 12 .

Crawford began boxing at the age of 12. His grandfather on his mother's side was boxer, Bobby Whelan, who died on the West Gate Bridge when it collapsed in 1970. Crawford was constantly picked on as a child for having freckles, blisters and red hair, he wanted to participate in boxing for a boost of confidence and to be able to look after himself. However, he was rejected from the PCYC Gym at the age of 10 since he was too young to join the gym.

When Crawford reached the age requirements to join the gym, he frequented the gym with his friend Ross under the guidance of Ron Miles, his boxing coach in Burnie. As a training exercise, Miles instructed Crawford and Ross to fight each other, and Ross had the upper hand at the beginning of their training. Crawford feels that this form of training is harsh and does more harm than good. Crawford sparred with boys larger in size, which made him cry. The harsh training resulted in a broken nose in the first few months of training at the age of 13, when he was knocked out by a senior boxer, Bernard Shields. Crawford disagrees with this teaching method where fighters are put into the ring lacking proper training on techniques, while he disagrees with this method of learning, he feels that it has made him tough.

As Crawford developed a great interest in boxing, he ran from Parklands High School to Burnie PCYC Gym four to five times a week, where he would spend three nights training by himself and two nights under the guidance of his trainer. Crawford also takes an interest in watching videos of senior boxers - Sugar Ray Robinson and Muhammad Ali competing in boxing matches while taking care of his two-year-old brother.

Crawford was offered the opportunity to compete two months into his training. While Crawford was ill-equipped for gym wars, a type of training where boxers fight with the intensity of an actual competition, Crawford still felt eager to fight and joined his first boxing competition. Crawford made his debut into competitive boxing on 19 October 1985, weighing 38 kg (84 lb). Crawford lost his first fight against a competitor from Melbourne, Tony Prestinezi who trained under Max Bowman, the referee had to stop the fight at the second round. While Crawford lost his next two bouts, he defeated Jason Baxter of the Queensland Boxing Association at a Queenstown tournament on 19 April 1989. Crawford then defeated Dean Parker from Hobart in the third round.

Following his multiple wins, Crawford began to set goals for his career. He believed in "the power of the mind" and would visualize his goals, he believes that "the more you see it, the more you believe it, the more you achieve.". This mindset was inspired by Crawford's mentor, Billy Barr, a professional squash player. Barr trained Crawford's mental strength with training techniques like shuttle runs and wall sits, Crawford feels that Barr's training has taught his mind to "reject a body that is desperate to quit". Suzanne Kim, a director who worked with Crawford on a music video featuring him commented on Crawford's visualisation method being "a big part of his boxing career"

At age 14, Crawford won six out of ten bouts, which included fights in a State junior lightweight 60 kg (130 lb) title and the selection of boxers to compete in the national titles in Sydney. Crawford started his training at the Burnie Police Boys Club in August 1985, and was seen sparring with Burnie's local champions Mark Filleul and Cole Thompson in preparation for the Adelaide association titles. On 16 August 1986, Crawford defeated Brendon Barber of the Hobart Police Boys Club.

In August 1987, Crawford, aged 14, competed in a tournament promoted by Peter Lord in the Glenorchy Football Clubroom, Crawford defeated a 16-year-old member of the Latrobe Boxing Club, Darren Woods, who also trained under world champion Gene Chugg.

=== Move to Hobart ===
In 1988, when Crawford was 14 turning 15, Burnie PCYC Gym made the decision to break away from the Tasmanian Boxing Association to work with the Tasmanian Boxing League. However, the Tasmanian Boxing League was excluded from the Olympic selection system, so fighters belonging to the league would not be able to compete as Olympic boxers.

Crawford's family decided to further his boxing career and moved to Hobart to stay with the Tasmanian Boxing Association, which led to his departure from Burnie PCYC Gym.

By the age of 17, Crawford competed in 33 boxing contests. He was a dual Australian junior champion with a title in Hobart, 1988 and for Melbourne, 1989. Retired boxing world champion Jeff Harding was at the ringside at Crawford's match during the 1988 Wrest Point Titles, he made a comment about the 17-year-old Justann Crawford as "a fighter with a very bright future". Johnny Lewis, a senior boxer from Sydney also described Crawford as "absolutely outstanding". Crawford's bout against Bo Belbin at the Hobart Hellenic Hall was described as the "Tasmanian fight of the year"

== 1992 Barcelona Olympics ==
The 1992 Summer Olympics was held in Barcelona, Spain. Prior to the games, the Tasmanian team spokesperson Michael Hodgman expressed that "If he does well in the worlds, then he'll be looking great to make The Australian team for next year's Barcelona Olympics." Crawford successfully entered his first Olympic Games where he competed in the Middleweight Division, but was defeated by Aleksandr Lebzyak of the Unified Team. He was defeated again fighting Aleksandr Lebziak in Round 16. The referee stopped both fights in the third round.

== International tournaments ==
=== Oceania Championship ===
In the 1993 Oceania championship, Justann defeated Greg Bell from Canterbury in the Light Heavyweight Division.

In the 1997 Championship hosted in Port Moresby, Papua New Guinea, Crawford was defeated by Regan Foley from Auckland at 3:2 points.

In 1998, the championship was hosted in Upper Hutt, New Zealand. Crawford defeats Stephen McIver from Canterbury where the referee stopped the contest.

=== King's Cup ===
In the 1993 King's Cup Championship hosted in Khon Kaen, Thailand]. On 6 April, Crawford competed in the Light Heavyweight Division semi-finals at 81 kg (179 lb) and defeated Young Deuk from Korea where the referee stopped the contest, resulting in an automatic win for Crawford, and proceeded to quarterfinals, where he defeated a Canadian competitor. He then defeated Ong-Art Prasertsung from Thailand. He proceeded to finals on 8 April and defeated Pino Bahari from Indonesia.

=== Mayors Cup ===
Crawford competed in the Mayor's Cup hosted in Manila, Philippines. On 8 December, Crawford at the weight of 81 kg (179 lb) defeated Sung-You Chang from Korea in the semi-finals where the referee stopped the match resulting in an automatic win for Crawford, he then defeated Pino Bahari from Indonesia at 17:4 points.

In 1998, Crawford competed in the Mayor's Cup hosted in Bacolod, Philippines. In the quarterfinals round, Crawford at 81 kg (179 lb) defeated Marco Bangard from Mauritius where the referee stopped the contest. Then Crawford proceeded to the semifinals and was defeated by Ernesto Coronel from the Philippines at 13:11 points.

== World ranking ==
In 1993, Crawford internationally ranked second in Light Heavyweight. In 1995, Crawford ranked fifth internationally in the Middleweight Division.

== 1994 Commonwealth Games ==
The 1994 Commonwealth Games was held in Victoria, Canada. The Australian team consisted of 256 competitors with five Aboriginal competitors in it. Justann Crawford competed with two other boxers, James Swan and Robert Peden.

== 1996 Summer Olympics ==
The 1996 Summer Olympics was held in Atlanta, US. Crawford won Round 1 with 12:3 points, but lost Round 2 because the referee stopped the contest, resulting in an automatic loss.

== End of career ==
In 1998, Crawford was appointed team captain of the Australian national team for the Commonwealth Games. However, Crawford was defeated in a fight in West Samoa before the games, he was then called in for a neuropsychological test by the Institute of Sport following growing concerns over his mental health. The reports to the Institute described Crawford to be "losing his mind" and showed signs of worsening memory, this concerned his peers as well as the institute. Crawford claimed that nothing was wrong with him and that the only problem was that his septum was going across his nose which distorted his voice, yet he still agreed to take the test. Prior to the test, Crawford consumed alcohol with his girlfriend, the night before he went to a training camp in Thailand, and failed the test since Crawford was hungover the next day. As a result, the Institute refused to let Crawford compete in boxing matches for failing the test. Crawford had a second attempt and showed improvements, but it was insufficient for him to return to the boxing ring. This put an end to his career as a boxer.

=== Controversy ===
Crawford's departure from the ring was considered controversial due to the lack of information on why Crawford was deemed unfit to compete in the Commonwealth Games despite being elected as team captain, while also being qualified to compete in the Commonwealth Games in the first place and the reason behind his sudden retirement from the boxing ring. It was concluded that the reason to his early retirement was an eye injury. However, Crawford spoke about the neuropsychological medical exam conducted on him in later years, revealing that the eye injury was not the only reason that he retired young.

== Amateur career ==
After retiring from the ring at age 25, Crawford returned to Tasmania Institute of Sport to be a manager of the boxing team. He described one of his jobs being "holding a microphone in the middle of the ring at the Carlyle Hotel in Hobart."

Crawford then dedicated his skills as a personal trainer at Balmain Fitness.

== Popular culture ==
Crawford starred in Lazy Colts' YouTube music video for his song "Be The One" . The video was released on 8 February 2019, on a channel under the name of "Lacey Cole", the video was directed by Suzanne Kim, produced by Tom Slater from Playtime Production Company.

The music video was awarded Best Directing (Australia) and nominated for Best Video (Australia) by Clipped TV's Clipped Music Video Festival 2019.

== Amateur boxing records ==
No.	Result	Date	Competition	Opponent	Win/Loss/Draw	Type	Age	Location
1	Loss	26 July 1996	Olympic Games (Middleweight)	(Russia) Alexander Lebziak	21/10/0	RSCH	23	(United States) Alexander Memorial Coliseum, Atlanta, U.S.
2	Win	22 July 1996	Olympic Games (Middleweight)	(Namibia) Sackey Shivute	6/4/0	PTS	22	(United States) Alexander Memorial Coliseum, Atlanta, U.S.
3	Loss	20 August 1994	Commonwealth Games (Light Heavyweight)	(United Kingdom) Kelly Oliver	5/0/0	PTS	21	Centennial Stadium, Victoria, Canada
4	Win	31 October 1992	Australian National Championships (Light Heavyweight)	(Australia) Garry Large	1/2/0	RSC	19	Darwin, Australia
5	Loss	26 July 1992	Olympic Games (Middleweight)	(Russia) Alexander Lebziak	12/5/0	RSCH	19	Pavello Club Joventut, Badalona, Spain
6	Loss	1 May 1992	Canada Cup (Middleweight)	(United States) Chris Byrd	23/14/0	PTS	18	Ottawa, Canada
7	Loss	19 November 1991	World Championships (Middleweight)	(Cuba) Ramon Garbey	10/3/0	RSC	18	Sydney Convention and Exhibition Centre, Sydney, Australia
8	Win	29 September 1991	Australian National Championships (Middleweight)	(Australia) Marc Bargero	4/0/0	PTS	18	Civic Centre, Perth, Australia
9	Win	28 October 1990	Australian National Championships (75Kilo)	(Australia) Steve Dack	1/2/0	KO	17	Dom Polski Centre, Adelaide, Australia
10	Win	26 October 1990	Australian National Championships (75Kilo)	(Australia) Ian McLeod	2/0/0	RSC	17	Dom Polski Centre, Adelaide, Australia
11	Win	5 November 1989	Australian Junior Championships	(Australia) Steven Satour	1/0/0	RSC	16	Town Hall, Preston, Australia
12	Win	13 November 1989	Australian Junior Championships	(Australia) Craig McFadden	0/0/0	PTS	16	Town Hall, Preston, Australia
