= Aleksey Katulevsky =

Kyrgyzstani boxer (born 1978)

Personal information
- Nationality: Kyrgyzstani
- Born: 19 December 1978 (age 46)

Sport
- Sport: Boxing

Aleksey Katulevsky (born 19 December 1978) is a Kyrgyzstani former boxer. He competed in the men's light heavyweight event at the 2000 Summer Olympics.
