= Ercüment Aslan =

Turkish boxer

Ercument Aslan
Personal information
- Nationality: Turkish
- Born: Ercument Aslan Ankara, Turkey
- Height: 1.82 m (6 ft 0 in)
- Weight: super middleweight

Boxing career
- Reach: 73 in (185 cm)
- Stance: Orthodox

Boxing record
- Total fights: 10 Archived 15 October 2012 at the Wayback Machine
- Wins: 8
- Losses: 2
- Draws: 0
- No contests: 0
Medal record
Men's boxing
Representing Turkey
World Amateur Championships
Gold medal – first place	1994 Istanbul	Welterweight
World Amateur Championships
Bronze medal – third place	1997 Budapest	Light Middleweight
European Amateur Boxing Championships
Silver medal – second place	1998 Minsk	Light Middleweight

Ercument Aslan is a Turkish boxer. He was born in Ankara (June 7, 1976). He spent his education and training life in Ankara. When he was 12, he started boxing in B.B.Ankaraspor. After 2 years, he elected to the national team. He represented the national team for 10 years. During this time he won the championship of Turkey 8 times. He moved to Australia in 2002 and continued boxing until 2009. He returned to Turkey in 2015. Then he started to work in Altındağ Belediyesi Spor Kulübü as a board member and a football branch manager in 2016. Then he led the team to the next league without any loses.

== Career ==
A member of the Turkey national boxing team since 1988, Ercument's amateur career record was 175-25. Highlights include being the Junior world amateur boxing championships in Istanbul in 1994, 3rd at the 1997 World Amateur Boxing Championships in Budapest in 1997 and 2nd at the 1998 European Amateur Boxing Championships. Unfortunately an injury at the World Amateur Championships in Houston in 1999 caused him to miss out on selection for the 2000 Olympic Games. He had a successful professional career with 8 wins and 2 losses.

- He won the state athlete title
- Turkey's National Olympic Torch award (1995)
- Athlete of the year two times
- Championships of Turkey 8 times (1992-2000)
- Junior World Amateur Boxing Championships in Istanbul (1994)
- He won the Championship of Golden Belt (1995, Romania)
- He became 3rd at the World Amateur Boxing Championships (1997, Hungary)
- He won the Mediterranean Olympics Championships (1997, Italy)
- He become 2nd at the European Amateur Boxing Championships (1998, Russia)
- Professional Boxing Career: 8 wins, 2 losses (2002-2008, Australia)
