= Boxing at the 2002 Asian Games – Men's 91 kg =

Boxing competitions

Men's 91 kg at the 2002 Asian Games
- Venue: Masan Gymnasium
- Date: 9–13 October 2002
- Competitors: 7 from 7 nations

Medalists
gold medal	Sergey Mihaylov	Uzbekistan
silver medal	Shaukat Ali	Pakistan
bronze medal	Lee Hyun-sung	South Korea
bronze medal	Nasser Al-Shami	Syria

The men's heavyweight (91 kilograms) event at the 2002 Asian Games took place from 9 to 13 October 2002 at Masan Gymnasium, Masan, South Korea.

== Schedule ==
All times are Korea Standard Time (UTC+09:00)

Date	Time	Event
Wednesday, 9 October 2002	14:00	Quarterfinals
Saturday, 12 October 2002	14:00	Semifinals
Sunday, 13 October 2002	14:00	Final

== Results ==
Legend

- RSCH — Won by referee stop contest head blow
- RSCO — Won by referee stop contest outclassed

Quarterfinals
Lee Hyun-sung (KOR)	27
Yousef Hasan (JOR)	24
Shaukat Ali (PAK)	33
Syrgak Kazakbaev (KGZ)	11
Nasser Al-Shami (SYR)	RSCH
Varghese Johnson (IND)

Semifinals
Sergey Mihaylov (UZB)	RSCO
Lee Hyun-sung (KOR)
Shaukat Ali (PAK)	RSCO
Nasser Al-Shami (SYR)

Final
Sergey Mihaylov (UZB)	RSCO
Shaukat Ali (PAK)
