= John Dovi =

French boxer (born 1973)

Personal information
- Full name: John Dovi
- Nationality: France
- Born: 2 January 1973 (age 53) Saint-Maurice, Val-de-Marne
- Height: 1.81 m (5 ft 11 in)
- Weight: 81 kg (179 lb)

Sport
- Sport: Boxing
- Weight class: Light Heavyweight
- Club: CSL Aulnay Sous Bois
Medal record
World Amateur Championships
Silver medal – second place	1999 Houston	Light Heavyweight
Bronze medal – third place	2001 Belfast	Light Heavyweight
European Amateur Championships
Silver medal – second place	2002 Perm	Light Heavyweight
EU Amateur Championships
Bronze medal – third place	2003 Strasbourg	Light Heavyweight

John Dovi (born 2 January 1973 in Saint-Maurice, Val-de-Marne, France) is a former French amateur boxer who medaled repeatedly in international competitions.

== Career ==
He was 7 times French light-heavy champ from 1999 to 2005. In Houston at the 1999 World Amateur Boxing Championships he controversially lost the final to Michael Simms.

In Sydney 2000 he beat Shawn Terry Cox but lost to eventual winner Alexander Lebziak 11:13.

In 2001 he won the bronze medal at Belfast defeating Artak Malumyan (ARM) 12–8, and Ireland's Alan Reynolds but losing to favorite southpaw Evgeny Makarenko 10:25.
