= Yuri Barashian =

Ukrainian boxer

Personal information
- Nationality: Ukrainian
- Born: Юрій Барашян; October 18, 1979 (age 46) Feodosiya, Ukraine
- Weight: Light heavyweight

Boxing career
- Stance: Southpaw

Boxing record
- Total fights: 37
- Wins: 28
- Win by KO: 19
- Losses: 9

Yuri Barashian (Ukrainian: Юрій Барашян (born October 18, 1979 in Feodosiya, Ukraine) is a Ukrainian professional boxer who held the European light-heavyweight title and challenged for the WBA light-heavyweight title in 2008.

== Professional career ==
Barashian won the European light-heavyweight title in February 2008 with a knockout win over Thomas Ulrich. Following the win, he was ranked as a top contender for the WBA light-heavyweight title. He faced Hugo Garay in July 2008, but lost a unanimous decision. In his next bout, Barashian challenged WBO champion Zsolt Erdei but was again defeated via unanimous decision. The bout would have been contested for Erdei's title, but Barashian missed the weight limit, making it a non-title bout.

== Professional boxing record ==
37 fights	28 wins	9 losses
By knockout	19	2
By decision	9	7

No.	Result	Record	Opponent	Type	Round, time	Date	Location	Notes
37	Win	28–9	(Ukraine) Roman Sergienko	RTD	4 (8), 3:00	20 May 2016	Theodoros Boxing Club, Kharkov, Ukraine	
36	Loss	27–9	(Gabon) Taylor Mabika	TKO	4 (8)	30 May 2015	Libreville, Gabon	
35	Loss	27–8	(Russia) Yury Kashinsky	RTD	7 (10), 3:00	28 Nov 2014	Sport Palace, Barnaul, Russia	
34	Loss	27–7	(Russia) Ruslan Fayfer	UD	8	26 Sep 2014	Basket-Hall, Krasnodar, Russia	For vacant WBC Baltic Silver cruiserweight title
33	Loss	27–6	(Latvia) Arturs Kulikauskis	UD	6	23 Feb 2013	Studio 69, Riga, Latvia	
32	Win	27–5	(Argentina) Juan Manuel Garay	MD	8	21 Oct 2012	Sport Complex "Prometey", Dniprodzerzhynsk, Ukraine	
31	Win	26–5	(Russia) Yuri Potanin	TKO	6 (6)	29 Oct 2010	Yubileiny Sports Palace, Saint Petersburg, Russia	
30	Loss	25–5	(Hungary) Zsolt Erdei	UD	12	10 Jan 2009	Bordelandhalle, Magdeburg, Germany	
29	Loss	25–4	(Argentina) Hugo Garay	UD	12	3 Jul 2008	Estadio Luna Park, Buenos Aires, Argentina	For vacant WBA light-heavyweight title
28	Win	25–3	(Germany) Thomas Ulrich	KO	8 (12), 0:56	23 Feb 2008	Brandberge Arena, Halle, Germany	Won European light-heavyweight title

Sporting positions
Regional boxing titles
Vacant Title last held by Vadym Safonov	Ukraine light-heavyweight champion 13 Feb 2005 – May 2005; Vacated	Title discontinued
Vacant Title last held by Silvio Branco	WBA Inter-Continental light-heavyweight champion 20 Jul 2005 – Jun 2006; Vacated	Vacant Title next held by Vyacheslav Uzelkov
Preceded by Thomas Ulrich	European light-heavyweight champion 23 Feb 2008 – 3 Jul 2008; Lost bid for WBA title	Vacant Title next held by Jürgen Brähmer
