= George Olwande Odindo =

Kenyan boxer

Personal information
- Nationality: Kenyan
- Born: 12 October 1971 (age 53)

Sport
- Sport: Boxing

George Olwande Odindo (born 12 October 1971) is a Kenyan boxer. He competed in the men's light heavyweight event at the 2000 Summer Olympics.
