= Giacobbe Fragomeni =

Italian boxer (born 1969)

Personal information
- Nickname: Gabibbo
- Nationality: Italian
- Born: 13 August 1969 (age 56) Milan, Lombardy, Italy
- Height: 1.77 m (5 ft 10 in)
- Weight: Cruiserweight

Boxing career
- Stance: Orthodox

Boxing record
- Total fights: 42
- Wins: 35
- Win by KO: 14
- Losses: 5
- Draws: 2
Medal record
Men's amateur boxing
Representing Italy
World Championships
Bronze medal – third place	1997 Budapest	Heavyweight
European Championships
Gold medal – first place	1998 Minsk	Heavyweight
Mediterranean Games
Gold medal – first place	1997 Bari	Heavyweight

Giacobbe Fragomeni (born 13 August 1969) is an Italian former professional boxer who competed from 2001 to 2017. He held the World Boxing Council (WBC) cruiserweight title from 2008 to 2009. As an amateur, he won a bronze medal at the 1997 World Championships; and gold at the 1997 Mediterranean Games and 1998 European Championships. Outside of boxing, he won the eleventh series of L'isola dei famosi in 2016.

== Professional career ==
Fragomeni made his professional debut on 19 May 2001, winning a four-round points decision against Henry Kolle Njume. Having won his next twenty fights, Fragomeni lost for the first time against European cruiserweight champion (and future heavyweight world champion) David Haye on 17 November 2006. This was a grudge match from their amateur days, as Fragomeni had defeated Haye in the final qualifiers for the 2000 Olympics. Fragomeni bounced back by winning the vacant European Union cruiserweight title with a unanimous decision (UD) over Vincenzo Rossitto on 31 July 2007, and went on to make two successful defences.

On 24 October 2008, Fragomeni won the vacant WBC cruiserweight title after a sixth-round technical decision against Rudolf Kraj. Their fight was stopped due to Fragomeni receiving a cut over the eye from an accidental headbutt by Kraj in round five. His first defence of the title, against Krzysztof Włodarczyk on 16 May 2009, ended in a split draw despite Fragomeni suffering two knockdowns but only one of them being considered legal by the referee. Fragomeni was not as fortunate in his next defence, on 21 November 2009, when he lost a very close majority decision to undefeated former light-heavyweight world champion Zsolt Erdei.

A rematch with Włodarczyk on 15 May 2010, almost exactly a year after their first fight, saw Fragomeni lose by stoppage in the eighth round. The WBC cruiserweight title, vacated by Erdei, was again at stake. A third fight between the two took place on 6 December 2013, with Włodarczyk's WBC title on the line once more. This time, Fragomeni was forced to retire in his corner after six largely one-sided rounds due to a cut which was caused by an accidental punch from Włodarczyk on the break.

Fragomeni faced Rakhim Chakhkiev for the vacant European cruiserweight title at Luzhniki Stadium in Moscow, Russia, on 24 October 2014, losing by stoppage in the fourth round.

== Professional boxing record ==
42 fights	35 wins	5 losses
By knockout	14	4
By decision	21	1
Draws	2	

No.	Result	Record	Opponent	Type	Round, time	Date	Location	Notes
42	Win	35–5–2	Vitaliy Neveselyy	UD	6	24 Jun 2017	Teatro Nuovo, Milan, Italy	
41	Win	34–5–2	Tamas Polster	KO	3 (6), 0:52	14 Jan 2017	Teatro della Luna, Assago, Italy	
40	Win	33–5–2	Marko Martinjak	PTS	8	4 Oct 2015	Piazza Garibaldi, Sorbolo, Italy	
39	Loss	32–5–2	Rakhim Chakhkiev	KO	4 (12), 0:52	24 Oct 2014	Luzhniki Stadium, Moscow, Russia	For vacant European cruiserweight title
38	Win	32–4–2	Olegs Lopajevs	TKO	2 (6), 1:53	26 Apr 2014	Molinello Play Village, Rho, Italy	
37	Loss	31–4–2	Krzysztof Włodarczyk	RTD	6 (12), 3:00	6 Dec 2013	UIC Pavilion, Chicago, Illinois, US	For WBC cruiserweight title
36	Win	31–3–2	Toni Visic	PTS	8	27 Jul 2013	Centro Sportivo Scolastico, Ferrara, Italy	
35	Win	30–3–2	Silvio Branco	SD	12	15 Dec 2012	PalaGarda, Riva del Garda, Italy	Won vacant WBC Silver cruiserweight title
34	Draw	29–3–2	Silvio Branco	MD	12	17 Mar 2012	PalaRavizza, Pavia, Italy	For vacant WBC Silver cruiserweight title
33	Win	29–3–1	Remigijus Ziausys	UD	6	8 Jul 2011	Piazza XX Settembre, Civitanova Marche, Italy	
32	Win	28–3–1	Laszlo Hubert	TKO	7 (12), 1:18	30 Apr 2011	Coliseum Don King, Texcoco, Mexico	Won vacant WBC International cruiserweight title
31	Win	27–3–1	Eduardo Ayala	TKO	6 (10), 1:47	5 Nov 2010	The Royal, Cancún, Mexico	
30	Loss	26–3–1	Krzysztof Włodarczyk	TKO	8 (12), 0:44	15 May 2010	Atlas Arena, Lodz, Poland	For vacant WBC cruiserweight title
29	Loss	26–2–1	Zsolt Erdei	MD	12	21 Nov 2009	Sparkassen-Arena, Kiel, Germany	Lost WBC cruiserweight title
28	Draw	26–1–1	Krzysztof Włodarczyk	SD	12	16 May 2009	GranTeatro, Rome, Italy	Retained WBC cruiserweight title
27	Win	26–1	Rudolf Kraj	TD	8 (12)	24 Oct 2008	PalaLido, Milan, Italy	Won vacant WBC cruiserweight title; Unanimous TD after Fragomeni was cut from an accidental head clash
26	Win	25–1	Konstantin Semerdjiev	UD	12	15 Apr 2008	Casinò, Campione d'Italia, Italy	Retained European Union cruiserweight title
25	Win	24–1	Rachid El Hadak	MD	12	22 Dec 2007	Datch Forum, Milan, Italy	Retained European Union cruiserweight title
24	Win	23–1	Vincenzo Rossitto	UD	12	31 Jul 2007	Centro Polifunzionale, San Genesio ed Uniti, Italy	Won vacant European Union cruiserweight title
23	Win	22–1	Adrian Rajkai	KO	4 (8)	21 Apr 2007	Stradella, Italy	
22	Loss	21–1	David Haye	TKO	9 (12), 1:29	17 Nov 2006	York Hall, London, England	For European cruiserweight title
21	Win	21–0	Andreas Günther	RTD	5 (8), 3:00	26 May 2006	Pabellón de Sa Blanca Dona, Ibiza, Spain	
20	Win	20–0	Rene Hübner	PTS	8	31 Jan 2006	Palazzetto dello Sport, Vobarno, Italy	
19	Win	19–0	Zoltán Béres	TKO	4 (6)	16 Dec 2005	PalaLido, Milan, Italy	
18	Win	18–0	Daniel Bispo	UD	12	12 Mar 2005	Mazda Palace, Milan, Italy	Retained WBC International cruiserweight title
17	Win	17–0	Frédéric Serrat	MD	12	13 Nov 2004	Palasport Palabrera, San Martino Siccomario, Italy	Won vacant WBC International cruiserweight title
16	Win	16–0	Radoslav Milutinovic	TKO	5 (6)	4 Sep 2004	Mede, Italy	
15	Win	15–0	Alessandro Guni	TKO	11 (12)	11 Jun 2004	PalaRavizza, Pavia, Italy	Won vacant IBF Mediterranean cruiserweight title
14	Win	14–0	Ismail Abdoul	PTS	8	10 Feb 2004	Cava Manara, Italy	
13	Win	13–0	Luis Oscar Ricail	UD	8	9 Dec 2003	PalaLido, Milan, Italy	
12	Win	12–0	Héctor Alfredo Ávila	PTS	8	14 Oct 2003	Pala Italia Online, Milan, Italy	
11	Win	11–0	Bruce Oezbek	PTS	6	9 Aug 2003	Villasimius, Italy	
10	Win	10–0	Otto Nemeth	TKO	4 (6)	22 Jul 2003	Piazza della Vittoria, Pavia, Italy	
9	Win	9–0	Radoslav Milutinovic	TKO	3 (6)	5 Nov 2002	Villa Erba, Italy	
8	Win	8–0	Radouana Ferchichi	PTS	6	23 Feb 2002	Milan, Italy	
7	Win	7–0	Christopher Robert	PTS	6	15 Dec 2001	Milan, Italy	
6	Win	6–0	Salah Rhouzi	KO	3 (6)	1 Dec 2001	Padua, Italy	
5	Win	5–0	Manfred Kong	PTS	6	10 Nov 2001	Milan, Italy	
4	Win	4–0	Jose Carlos Maia	TKO	4 (6)	13 Oct 2001	Milan, Italy	
3	Win	3–0	Cyril Bongi	PTS	6	10 Aug 2001	Catanzaro, Calabria, Italy	
2	Win	2–0	Velimir Listes	KO	1 (6)	28 Jul 2001	Piove di Sacco, Italy	
1	Win	1–0	Henry Kolle Njume	PTS	4	19 May 2001	Milan, Italy	

Sporting positions
Regional boxing titles
New title	IBF Mediterranean cruiserweight champion 11 June 2004 – November 2004; Vacated	Vacant Title next held by Fabio Tuiach
Vacant Title last held by Vincenzo Rossitto	WBC International cruiserweight champion 13 November 2004 – July 2006; Vacated	Vacant Title next held by Grigory Drozd
Vacant Title last held by Marco Huck	European Union cruiserweight champion 31 July 2007 – October 2008; Vacated	Vacant Title next held by Lubos Suda]
Vacant Title last held by Silvio Branco	WBC International cruiserweight champion 30 April 2011 – November 2011; Vacated	Vacant Title next held by Aleksandr Alekseyev
Vacant Title last held by David Quinonero	WBC Silver cruiserweight champion 15 December 2012 – July 2013; Vacated	Vacant Title next held by Silvio Branco
World boxing titles
Vacant Title last held by David Haye	WBC cruiserweight champion 24 October 2008 – 21 November 2009	Succeeded by Zsolt Erdei
