= Daniel Bispo =

Brazilian boxer (born 1974)

Daniel Bispo dos Santos (born June 16, 1974, in São Paulo) is a boxer from Brazil. He represented his native country at the 1996 Summer Olympics in Atlanta, United States.

== Pro ==
He made his professional debut in 1997. On March 12, 2005, he was defeated in the fight for the World Boxing Council International cruiserweight title by Italy's Giacobbe Fragomeni in the Mazda Palace in Milan.

== Professional boxing record ==
22 Wins (16 knockouts, 6 decisions), 16 Losses (7 knockouts, 9 decisions)
Result	Record	Opponent	Type	Round	Date	Location	Notes
Loss	8-0	(United Kingdom) Richard Towers	TKO	2	26 Feb 2011	(United Kingdom) Bolton, England	Referee stopped the bout at 2:51 of the second round.
Loss	47-4	(Argentina) Gonzalo Basile	UD	6	4 Sep 2010	Mar del Plata, Argentina	
Loss	46-4	(Argentina) Gonzalo Basile	UD	10	23 Jul 2010	Lomas de Zamora, Argentina	WBC Latino/Mundo Hispano Heavyweight titles
Loss	32-0	(United States) David Rodriguez	TKO	2	27 Mar 2010	Monterrey, Mexico	Referee stopped the bout at 1:50 of the second round.
Win	--	(Brazil) Fidel Jorge Mando	RTD	1	26 Feb 2010	São Paulo, Brazil	Mando retired at 1:24 of the first round.
Loss	22-1	(Canada) Troy Ross	KO	1	5 Dec 2009	Montreal, Quebec, Canada	Bispo knocked out at 1:12 of the first round.
Win	0-1	(Brazil) Jose Raimundo	TKO	1	24 Mar 2009	São Paulo, Brazil	
Loss	11-0	(Russia) Alexander Ustinov	KO	2	22 Aug 2008	Beijing, China	
Loss	15-0	(France) Carlos Takam	TKO	3	5 Jun 2008	Paris, France	
Loss	11-1-1	(Azerbaijan) Ali Ismailov	UD	8	3 Apr 2008	Saint Petersburg, Russia	
Win	0-10	(Brazil) Dacio Pereira da Silva	TKO	4	27 Oct 2007	São Paulo, Brazil	
Loss	11-0	(Cuba) Yoan Pablo Hernandez	KO	1	18 Aug 2007	Prenzlauer Berg, Berlin, Germany	WBA Fedelatin Cruiserweight title Bispo knocked out at 1:01 of the first round.
Loss	41-3	(South Africa) Corrie Sanders	UD	10	12 May 2007	Kempton Park, South Africa	
Win	0-1	(Brazil) Paulo Dos Santos Aragao	KO	2	5 Apr 2007	São Paulo, Brazil	
Loss	22-1	(Czech Republic) Roman Kracik	UD	10	1 Dec 2006	Prague, Czech Republic	Czech International Cruiserweight title
Loss	31-4-1	(Italy) Vincenzo Cantatore	UD	10	21 Oct 2006	Rome, Lazio, Italy	
Win	2-5	(Brazil) Wesley Barbosa	KO	3	16 Sep 2006	São Paulo, Brazil	
Loss	9-0-1	(United States) Kevin Johnson	UD	10	10 Jun 2006	(United States) Atlantic City, New Jersey, U.S.	
Win	0-4	(Brazil) Ramiro Borges	KO	2	6 May 2006	São Paulo, Brazil	
Loss	24-3	(United States) Fres Oquendo	TKO	9	16 Feb 2006	(United States) New York City, U.S.	Referee stopped the bout at 1:55 of the ninth round.
Win	0-5	(Brazil) Dacio Pereira da Silva	KO	2	30 Sep 2005	São Paulo, Brazil	Silva knocked out at 1:20 of the second round.
Loss	5-1	(Romania) Claudio Rasco	UD	6	9 Apr 2005	Montreal, Quebec, Canada	
Loss	17-0	(Italy) Giacobbe Fragomeni	UD	12	12 Mar 2005	Milan, Lombardia, Italy	WBC International Cruiserweight title
Win	10-6-2	(United States) Jonathan Young	UD	6	5 Nov 2004	(United States) Las Vegas, Nevada, U.S.	
Win	0-2	(Brazil) Josemir De Oliveira	KO	4	7 Aug 2004	São Paulo, Brazil	CBBP Brazil Heavyweight title
Win	31-8	(Brazil) Rogério Lobo	UD	10	24 Jan 2004	São Paulo, Brazil	CBBP Brazil Heavyweight title
Win	1-8	(Brazil) Richard Da Gloria	TKO	5	15 Nov 2003	São Paulo, Brazil	
Win	0-1	(Brazil) Luis Americo Kihara	TKO	3	25 Jul 2003	Araras, Brazil	
Win	--	(Brazil) Luis Uizcarra	KO	2	18 May 2002	Araras, Brazil	
Win	0-1	(Brazil) Reinaldo Fidelis	UD	6	20 Apr 2002	Avaré, Brazil	
Win	0-4	(Brazil) Richard Da Gloria	UD	4	23 Dec 2001	Carapicuiba, Brazil	
Win	0-5	(Brazil) Marival Sobral Sobrinho	TKO	1	21 Oct 2001	Curitiba, Brazil	
Win	1-28	(Brazil) Lourival Luiz Da Silva	UD	6	20 Jul 2001	São Paulo, Brazil	
Win	--	(Brazil) Silvio Silva Nascimento	KO	2	8 Jun 2001	Ferraz de Vasconcelos, Brazil	
Win	--	(Brazil) Aloisio Vieira	KO	2	5 May 2001	Cabreuva, Brazil	
Win	0-2	(Brazil) Josevaldo Alves de Oliveira	TKO	4	10 Jun 2000	Araras, Brazil	
Win	0-1-1	(Brazil) Ricardo Lobo	TKO	2	13 May 2000	Juquia, Brazil	
Win	--	(Brazil) Gerson Uletra	UD	6	12 Apr 1997	Aguas de Lindoia, Brazil	
