= Artur Gevorgyan =

Armenian boxer

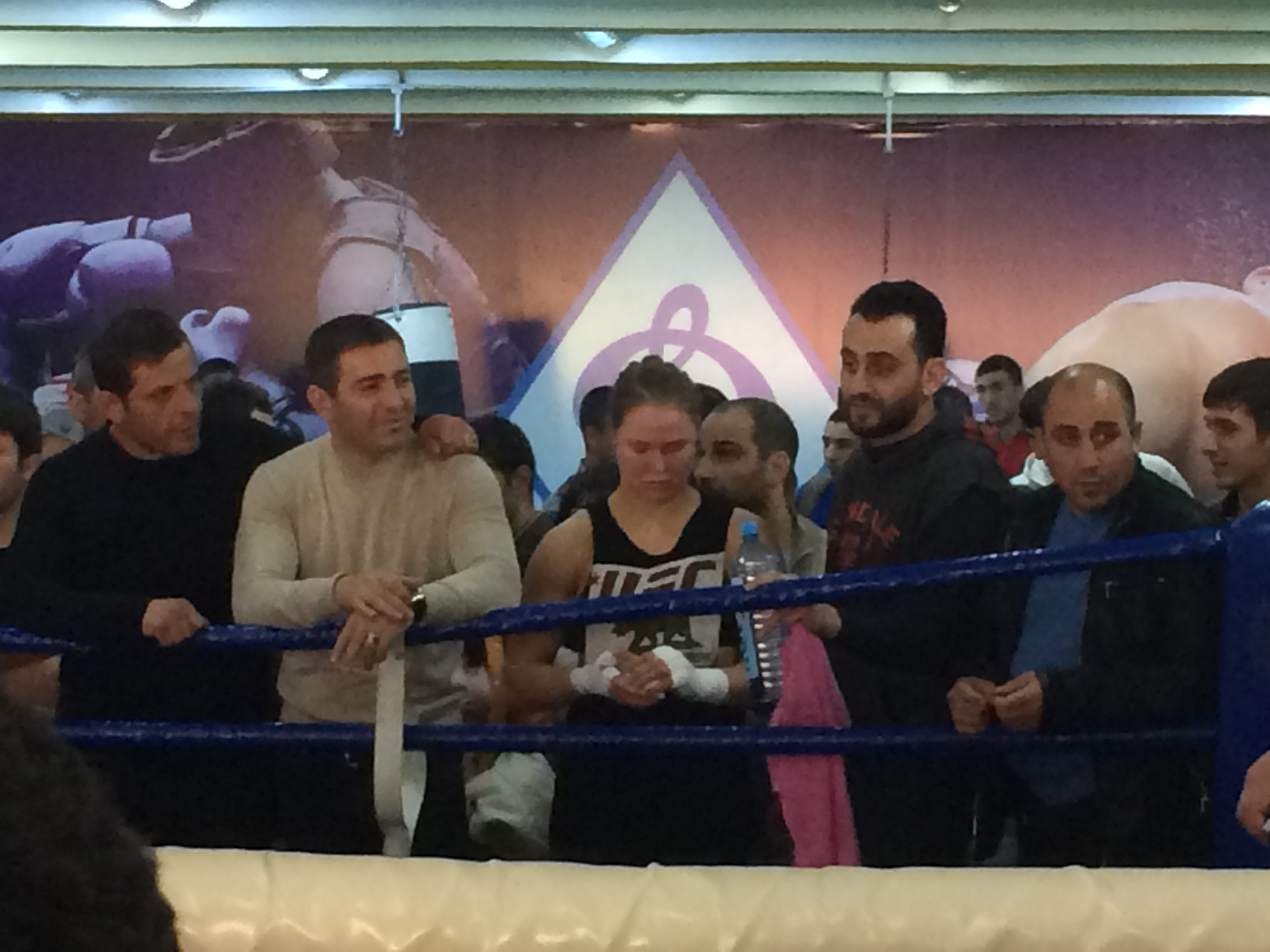
- Gevorgyan (second from the left) with Ronda Rousey

Personal information
- Native name: Արթուր Սամվելի Գևորգյան
- Full name: Artur Samveli Gevorgyan
- Nationality: Armenian
- Born: April 1, 1975 (age 51) Yerevan, Armenian SSR, Soviet Union
- Height: 1.76 m (5 ft 9 in)
- Weight: 60 kg (130 lb)

Sport
- Sport: Boxing
- Weight class: Lightweight
Medal record
European Amateur Championships
Bronze medal – third place	1998 Minsk	Lightweight

Artur Samveli Gevorgyan (Armenian: Արթուր Սամվելի Գևորգյան, born April 1, 1975) is an Armenian boxer, now based in Los Angeles, California. He is a two-time Olympian who competed at the 1996 Summer Olympics and 2000 Summer Olympics in the lightweight division. Gevorgyan also won a bronze medal at the 1998 European Amateur Boxing Championships. He later turned professional and had a record of 6–2.

Since 1987 He has been involved in boxing. In 1989 He became the winner of the Junior Championships of the Union of Soviet Socialist Republics, completing the master of sports norms. In 1994-1996 He served in the Armenian army. In 1996, He graduated from the Yerevan State Institute of Physical Culture. In 1998 his name was registered in the epic book of the Armenian State Institute of Physical Culture. In 2012-2014 He entered and graduated from the Yerevan State University's Master of International Relations Department. He has a diploma qualification.

He had been awarded the title of Master of International Sport.

From 2005 to 2008, He was the deputy head of Davtashen community in Yerevan. On May 18, 2008, he was elected head of Davtashen community. On June 15, 2009, he was appointed head of the Davtashen administrative district of Yerevan ։ He was elected Member of National Assembly in the 2012 and 2017 parliamentary elections: In 2012, He was awarded the highest award of Yerevan, the gold medal of Yerevan Mayor: In 2014, He was awarded the National Medal of Honor for the contribution to the development and prosperity of Armenian sport. In 2013, He was elected the President of the Armenian Boxing Federation.
