= Rudolf Kraj =

Czech boxer

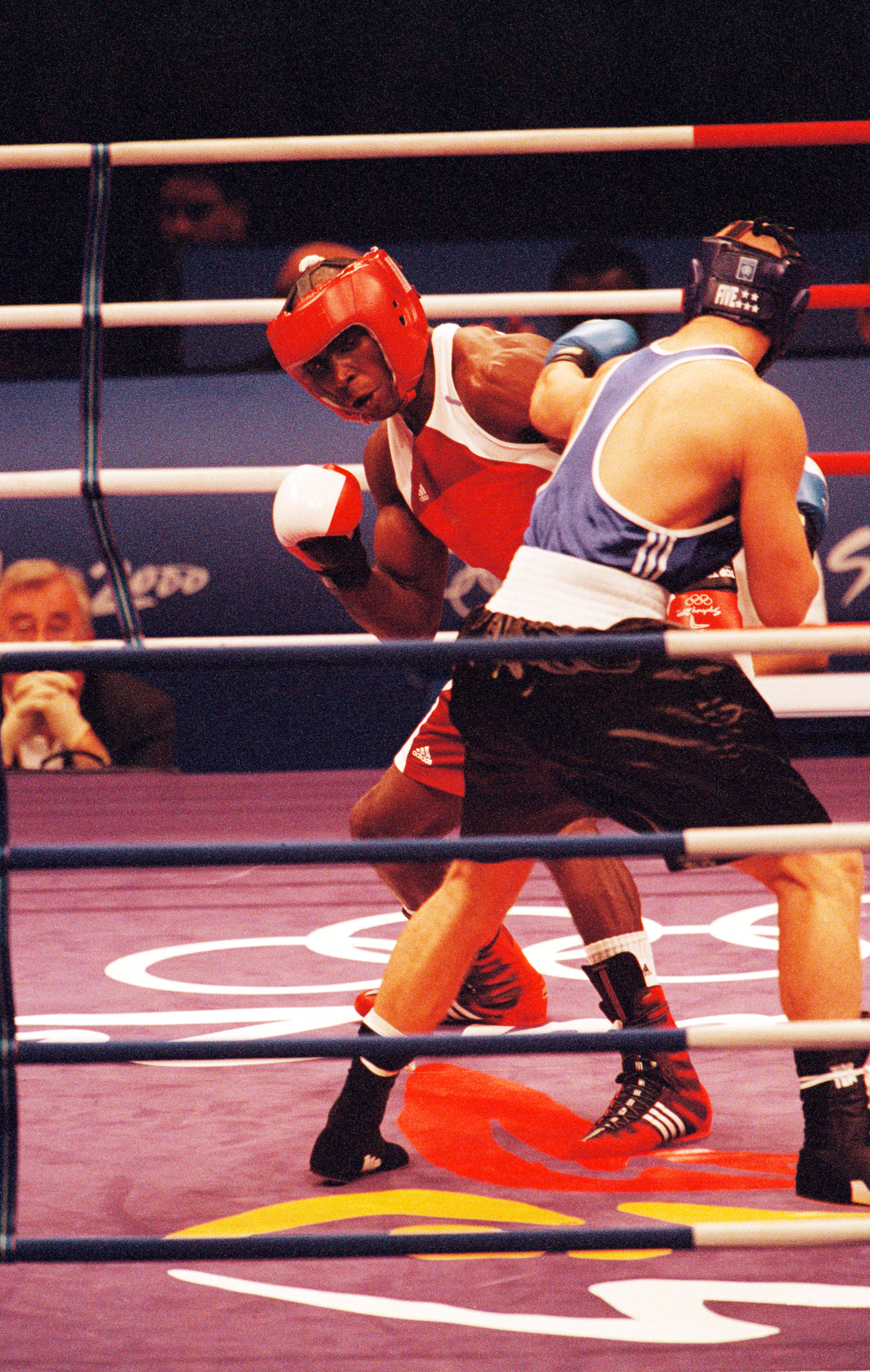
- Olanda Anderson (left), avoids a jab from his opponent Rudolf Kraj, of the Czech Republic, during the men's light heavyweight boxing match at the 2000 Olympic Games in Sydney, Australia, on 24 September 2000.

Personal information
- Nationality: Czech
- Born: 5 December 1977 (age 48) Mělník, Czech Republic
- Height: 6 ft 1 in (1.85 m)
- Weight: Cruiserweight

Boxing career
- Stance: Orthodox

Boxing record
- Total fights: 15
- Wins: 14
- Win by KO: 10
- Losses: 1
- Draws: 0

Rudolf Kraj
Medal record

Representing Czech Republic

Men's Boxing

Olympic Games
Silver medal – second place	2000 Sydney	Light Heavyweight

World Amateur Championships
Bronze medal – third place	2003 Bangkok	Light Heavyweight

Rudolf Kraj (Czech pronunciation: [ˈrudolf ˈkraj]) (born 5 December 1977 in Mělník, Czechoslovakia) is a Czech boxer.

== Amateur ==
He won the silver medal in the men's Light Heavyweight (81 kg) category at the 2000 Summer Olympics in Sydney. He lost to Aleksandr Lebziak in the final.

He also won a bronze medal at the World Amateur Boxing Championships in Bangkok losing to another Russian, the eventual winner Evgeny Makarenko. He won 170 out of 200 amateur matches.

=== Olympic results ===
  - 1st round bye
  - Defeated Olanda Anderson (United States) 13–12
  - Defeated Jegbefumer Albert (Nigeria) 8–7
  - Defeated Andriy Fedchuk (Ukraine) 11–7
  - Lost to Aleksandr Lebziak (Russia) 6–20

== Professional ==
Kraj began his professional career in 2005 in Germany and won all his thirteen bouts in the cruiserweight division including a stoppage of Armenian Melkomian (record 20–1).

He fought Giacobbe Fragomeni for the WBC Cruiserweight title on 24 October 2008 and lost the fight by technical decision after eight rounds after and accidental headbutt earlier in the fight. His record is 14–1 with 10 knockouts.

== Professional boxing record ==
14 Wins (10 knockouts), 1 Loss, 0 Draws
Res.	Record	Opponent	Type	Round	Date	Location	Notes
Loss	14–1	(Italy) Giacobbe Fragomeni	TD	8 (12)	2008-10-24	(Italy) PalaLido, Milan	for the vacant WBC cruiserweight title
Win	14–0	(United States) Matt Godfrey	UD	12 (12)	2008-03-08	(Germany) König Palast, Krefeld, North Rhine-Westphalia	
Win	13–0	(Argentina) Orlando Antonio Farias	KO	1 (12)	2007-12-04	Freizeit Arena, Sölden, Austria	retained the WBC International cruiserweight title
Win	12–0	(Morocco) Ismail Abdoul	UD	12 (12)	2007-06-12	Tabor Arena, Maribor, Slovenia	retained the WBC International cruiserweight title
Win	11–0	(Argentina) Mauro Adrian Ordiales	TKO	3 (12)	2007-04-28	(Germany) König Pilsener Arena, Oberhausen, North Rhine-Westphalia	retained the WBC International cruiserweight title
Win	10–0	(Argentina) Cesar David Crenz	TKO	8 (12)	2007-01-13	(Germany) Brandberge Arena, Halle an der Saale, Saxony-Anhalt	retained the WBC International cruiserweight title
Win	9–0	(Armenia) Pavel Melkomyan	MD	10 (10)	2006-10-10	T-Mobile Arena, Prague, Czech Republic	won the vacant WBC International cruiserweight title
Win	8–0	(France) Rachid El Hadak	UD	6 (6)	2006-07-25	(Germany) Sportschule Sachsenwald, Eimsbüttel, Hamburg	
Win	7–0	(Czech Republic) Jindrich Velecky	UD	10 (10)	2006-05-09	Sazka Arena, Prague, Czech Republic	
Win	6–0	(Romania) Mircea Telecan	TKO	4 (6)	2009-04-15	(Germany) Maritim Hotel, Magdeburg, Saxony-Anhalt	
Win	5–0	(Armenia) Vage Kocharyan	RTD	3 (6)	2009-02-28	(Germany) Alte Reithalle, Stuttgart, Baden-Württemberg	
Win	4–0	(Slovakia) Robert Borok	TKO	1 (4)	2005-11-15	(Germany) Hohenstaufenhalle, Göppingen, Baden-Württemberg	
Win	3–0	(Latvia) Rustams Tumasevics	KO	1 (4)	2005-10-29	(Germany) TURM Erlebnis City, Oranienburg, Brandenburg	
Win	2–0	(Romania) Valeriu Vasili Dobrin	TKO	1 (4)	2005-09-20	T-Mobile Arena, Prague, Czech Republic	
Win	1–0	(Czech Republic) Tomáš Mrázek	TKO	1 (4)	2005-03-26	(Germany) Erdgas Arena, Riesa, Saxony	Kraj's professional debut
