= Olzhas Orazaliyev =

Kazakhstani boxer (born 1980)

Personal information
- Nationality: Kazakhstan
- Born: January 2, 1980 (age 46) Shymkent, Kazakh SSR, Soviet Union
- Height: 1.82 m (6 ft 0 in)
- Weight: 81 kg (179 lb)

Sport
- Sport: Boxing
- Event: Light heavyweight

Olzhas Orazaliyev (Kazakh: Олжас Оразалиев, Oljas Orazaliev; born January 2, 1980) is a Kazakhstani amateur boxer from Shymkent.

At the 2000 Summer Olympics, Orazaliyev defeated Argentina's Hugo Garay and Cuba's Isael Álvarez in the first two rounds, until he lost to Sergey Mihaylov of Uzbekistan in the quarterfinal match.
