= Djibril Fall =

Senegalese boxer (born 1976)

Personal information
- Nationality: Senegalese
- Born: 12 December 1976 (age 48)

Sport
- Sport: Boxing

El Hadji Djibril Fall (born 12 December 1976) is a Senegalese boxer. He competed in the men's light heavyweight event at the 2000 Summer Olympics.
