= Hugo Garay =

Argentine boxer (born 1980)

Personal information
- Nickname: Pigu
- Born: Hugo Hernán Garay; 27 November 1980 (age 45) Tigre, Buenos Aires, Argentina
- Height: 6 ft 0 in (183 cm)
- Weight: Light heavyweight; Cruiserweight

Boxing career
- Reach: 77 in (196 cm)
- Stance: Orthodox

Boxing record
- Total fights: 41
- Wins: 34
- Win by KO: 18
- Losses: 7
Medal record
Men's Boxing
Representing Argentina
Pan American Games
Bronze medal – third place	1999 Winnipeg	Light heavyweight

Hugo Hernán Garay (born 27 November 1980) is an Argentine professional boxer who fights at light heavyweight.

== Career ==
Garay won the silver medal in Buenos Aires World Junior Championships in 1998. In the 1999 Pan American Games, he won the bronze medal in the men's light-heavyweight category.

Garay represented Argentina at the 2000 Summer Olympics. There he was stopped in the first round of the men's light-heavyweight division (– 81 kg) by Kazakhstan's Olzhas Orazaliev. He made his professional debut on 2001-07-14, defeating Abel Alejandro Rodríguez.

Garay was to fight champion Danny Green for the WBA Light Heavyweight Title on 27 April 2008 at Challenge Stadium in Perth, Australia. However, following the sudden retirement of Green in March of that year, Garay fought Yuri Barashian instead on 3 July 2008 in Buenos Aires for the vacant belt, winning via twelve-round unanimous decision. On 22 November, he defeated Jürgen Brähmer by unanimous decision in his first title defense.

== Professional boxing record ==
41 fights	34 wins	7 losses
By knockout	18	3
By decision	16	3
By disqualification	0	1

No.	Result	Record	Opponent	Type	Round, time	Date	Location	Notes
41	Loss	34–7	Cesar David Crenz	TKO	5 (8)	2011-10-14	Estadio Luna Park, Buenos Aires, Argentina	
40	Loss	34–6	Marco Huck	KO	10 (12)	2011-07-16	Olympia Eishalle, Munich, Bavaria, Germany	For WBO World Cruiserweight title.
39	Win	34–5	Martin David Islas	UD	6 (6)	2011-04-08	Club Ciclista Juninense, Junin, Buenos Aires Province, Argentina	
38	Win	33–5	Marcelo Leandro Da Silva	KO	1 (8)	2010-08-14	Hogar de los Tigres, Sunchales, Santa Fe, Argentina	
37	Loss	32–5	Chris Henry	TKO	1 (12)	2010-03-27	Arena Monterrey, Monterrey, Nuevo Leon, Mexico	
36	Loss	32–4	Gabriel Campillo	MD	12 (12)	2009-06-20	Hogar de los Tigres, Sunchales, Santa Fe, Argentina	Lost WBA World Light Heavyweight title.
35	Win	32–3	Jürgen Brähmer	UD	12 (12)	2008-11-22	Stadthalle, Rostock, Mecklenburg-Vorpommern, Germany	Retained WBA World Light Heavyweight title.
34	Win	31–3	Yuri Barashian	UD	12 (12)	2008-07-03	Estadio Luna Park, Buenos Aires, Argentina	Won vacant WBA World Light Heavyweight title.
33	Win	30–3	Eduardo Franca	KO	2 (11)	2007-11-25	Club Sportivo Barraca, Armstrong, Santa Fe, Argentina	Won vacant WBA Fedelatin Light Heavyweight title.
32	Loss	29–3	Franco Raul Sanchez	DQ	2 (8)	2007-10-27	Ce.De.M. N° 2, Caseros, Buenos Aires, Argentina	Garay disqualified for hitting after the bell.
31	Win	29–2	Orlando Antonio Farias	KO	1 (10)	2007-07-27	Hogar de los Tigres, Sunchales, Santa Fe, Argentina	
30	Win	28–2	Alejandro Agustin Alvarez	KO	2 (10)	2007-03-24	Ce.De.M. N° 2, Caseros, Buenos Aires, Argentina	
29	Win	27–2	Fernando Roberto Vera	KO	4 (8)	2006-12-16	Estadio Libertadores de América, Avellaneda, Argentina	
28	Win	26–2	Gustavo Enriquez	UD	10 (10)	2006-04-08	Estadio Luna Park, Buenos Aires, Argentina	Won vacant WBA Fedelatin Light Heavyweight title.
27	Win	25–2	Cristian Dario Leal	UD	10 (10)	2005-10-07	Estadio Luna Park, Buenos Aires, Argentina	Retained Argentina Light Heavyweight title.
26	Win	24–2	Miguel Angel Robledo	TKO	4 (10)	2005-06-25	Club Aguada, Montevideo, Uruguay	
25	Loss	23–2	Zsolt Erdei	SD	12 (12)	2005-02-26	Color Line Arena, Altona, Hamburg, Germany	For WBO World Light Heavyweight title.
24	Win	23–1	Sergio Martin Beaz	UD	6 (6)	2004-12-10	Club General Paz Juniors, Cordoba, Argentina	
23	Win	22–1	Felix Jose Hernandez	KO	6 (10)	2004-11-10	Ce.De.M. N° 2, Caseros, Buenos Aires, Argentina	
22	Win	21–1	Nestor Fabian Casanova	KO	1 (10)	2004-08-21	Ce.De.M. N° 2, Caseros, Buenos Aires, Argentina	
21	Loss	20–1	Zsolt Erdei	MD	12 (12)	2004-05-08	Westfallenhalle, Dortmund, North Rhine-Westphalia, Germany	For WBO World Light Heavyweight title.
20	Win	20–0	Sergio Martin Beaz	UD	12 (12)	2004-02-21	Polideportivo Municipal Carlos Cerutti, Villa Carlos Paz, Argentina	Won South America Light Heavyweight title.
19	Win	19–0	Alejandro Lakatos	TKO	12 (12)	2003-11-06	Pabellon B, Alcobendas, Comunidad de Madrid, Spain	Retained WBO Latino Light Heavyweight title.
18	Win	18–0	Peter Venancio	UD	12 (12)	2003-09-20	Conrad Hotel & Casino, Punta del Este, Uruguay	Retained WBO Latino Light Heavyweight title.
17	Win	17–0	Sergio Martin Beaz	UD	10 (10)	2003-07-12	Estadio FAB, Buenos Aires, Argentina	
16	Win	16–0	Hector Ricardo Sotelo	TKO	1 (10)	2003-05-24	Radisson Victoria Plaza, Montevideo, Uruguay	Won Argentina Light Heavyweight title.
15	Win	15–0	Peter Venancio	KO	4 (12)	2003-03-22	Radisson Victoria Plaza, Montevideo, Uruguay	Won vacant WBO Latino Light Heavyweight title.
14	Win	14–0	Hector Ricardo Sotelo	UD	8 (8)	2003-02-15	Polideportivo Municipal Carlos Cerutti, Villa Carlos Paz, Argentina	
13	Win	13–0	Juan Eduardo Zabala	TKO	3 (8)	2002-12-06	Hotel Cordoba Plaza, Cordoba, Argentina	
12	Win	12–0	Daniel Adrian Arruda	TKO	2 (6)	2002-10-19	Estadio Luna Park, Buenos Aires, Argentina	
11	Win	11–0	Hugo Ricardo Rodriguez	UD	6 (6)	2002-09-13	Gimnasio Municipal Nº 1, Trelew, Chubut Province, Argentina	
10	Win	10–0	Walter Fabian Basabez	TKO	1 (6)	2002-08-31	Estadio Pascual Perez, Mendoza, Argentina	
9	Win	9–0	Jorge Enrique Arguello	KO	1 (6)	2002-07-13	Estadio Luna Park, Buenos Aires, Argentina	
8	Win	8–0	Hector Ricardo Sotelo	UD	8 (8)	2002-05-25	Villa Gesell, Buenos Aires Province, Argentina	
7	Win	7–0	Orlando Javier Acuna	UD	8 (8)	2002-04-13	Estadio FAB, Buenos Aires, Argentina	
6	Win	6–0	Adolfo Obando	UD	6 (6)	2002-03-02	Estadio FAB, Buenos Aires, Argentina	
5	Win	5–0	Aaron Orlando Soria	UD	4 (4)	2002-01-19	Estadio FAB, Buenos Aires, Argentina	
4	Win	4–0	Juan Eduardo Zabala	TKO	3 (4)	2001-11-17	Estadio FAB, Buenos Aires, Argentina	
3	Win	3–0	Jose Daniel Velazquez	UD	4 (4)	2001-10-20	Estadio FAB, Buenos Aires, Argentina	
2	Win	2–0	Gabriel Gustavo Heck	RTD	1 (4)	2001-08-11	Estadio Malvinas Argentinas, Mendoza, Argentina	
1	Win	1–0	Abel Alejandro Rodriguez	KO	1 (4)	2001-07-14	CeDeM N 2, Caseros, Buenos Aires, Argentina	

== See also ==
- List of world light-heavyweight boxing champions

Sporting positions
Regional boxing titles
Preceded by Sergio Martin Beaz	South American light heavyweight champion 21 February 2004 – 2005; Vacated	Vacant Title next held by Julio César Domínguez
World boxing titles
Vacant Title last held by Danny Green	WBA light heavyweight champion 3 July 2008 – 20 June 2009	Succeeded by Gabriel Campillo
