= Michael Evans (boxer) =

American boxer

Michael Evans (born July 22, 1977) is a 140 lb. 5'9" American lightweight boxer from Dayton, Ohio. Evans has won numerous titles including the 1999 and 2005 Golden Gloves championships, National US Senior Open Gold Medalist-2005, and a National PAL Championships Gold Medalist in 2004. Michael also represented the United States at the Olympic Team Trials finishing as a bronze medalist in 2000 and a bronze medalist in the World Goodwill Games in 1998.

Evans was raised in poverty and has spent seven years in prison, including a stint for dealing crack-cocaine. In 2010 Evans re-entered boxing after serving time in prison.
