= Evgeny Makarenko =

Russian boxer

Yevgeny Makarenko
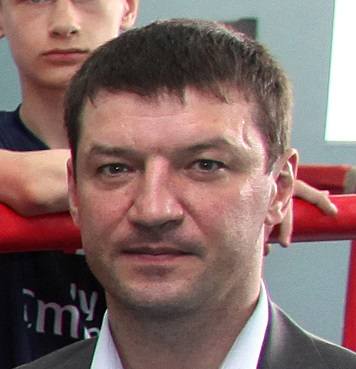

Personal information
- Full name: Евгений Михайлович Макаренко
- Nationality: Russia
- Born: October 10, 1975 (age 50) Nizhnevartovsk, Tyumen
- Height: 1.96 m (6 ft 5 in)
- Weight: 81 kg (179 lb)

Sport
- Sport: Boxing
- Weight class: Light Heavyweight
- Club: Dynamo, Nizhnevartovsk
Medal record
World Amateur Championships
| Gold medal – first place | 2001 Belfast | Light Heavyweight |
| Gold medal – first place | 2003 Bangkok | Light Heavyweight |
European Amateur Championships
| Gold medal – first place | 2002 Perm | Heavyweight |
| Gold medal – first place | 2004 Pula | Light Heavyweight |
| Bronze medal – third place | 1998 Minsk | Heavyweight |
World Cup
| Gold medal – first place | 2005 Moscow | Light Heavyweight |

Yevgeny Mikhaylovich Makarenko (born 10 October 1975) is a boxer from Russia best known to win two world titles 2001 and 2003 at light heavyweight, and him being a part of the 2005 Russian team at the Boxing World Cup.

== Career ==
Makarenko won a bronze in 1998 and dominated light heavyweight between 2001 and 2006.

In 2005 he was part of the Russian team that won the 2005 Boxing World Cup.

He won gold medals at

- the 2001 World Amateur Boxing Championships,
- the 2002 European Amateur Boxing Championships
- the 2003 World Amateur Boxing Championships where he beat Rudolf Kraj.
- the 2004 European Amateur Boxing Championships in Pula, Croatia.
- and the 2005 Boxing World Cup.

He also participated in the 2004 Summer Olympics but was upset in the quarterfinals of the Light heavyweight (81 kg) division by USA's eventual winner Andre Ward.

2006 he beat highly touted newcomer Artur Beterbiev but lost to him in 2007 hindering from participating in the World Championships.
