= Imendyashevo =

Imendyashevo Имендяшево
- Selo
- Location within Bashkortostan Location within Russia
- Coordinates: 54°08′N 56°45′E
- Country: Russia
- Region: Bashkortostan
- District: Gafuriysky District
- Time zone: UTC+5:00

Imendyashevo (Russian: Имендяшево; Bashkir: Имәндәш, İmändäş) is a rural locality (a selo) in Imendyashevsky Selsoviet, Gafuriysky District, Bashkortostan, Russia. The population was 341 as of 2010. There are 6 streets.

== Geography ==
Imendyashevo is located 53 km northeast of Krasnousolsky (the district's administrative centre) by road. Taishevo is the nearest rural locality.
