= Laudelino Barros =

Brazilian boxer (born 1975)

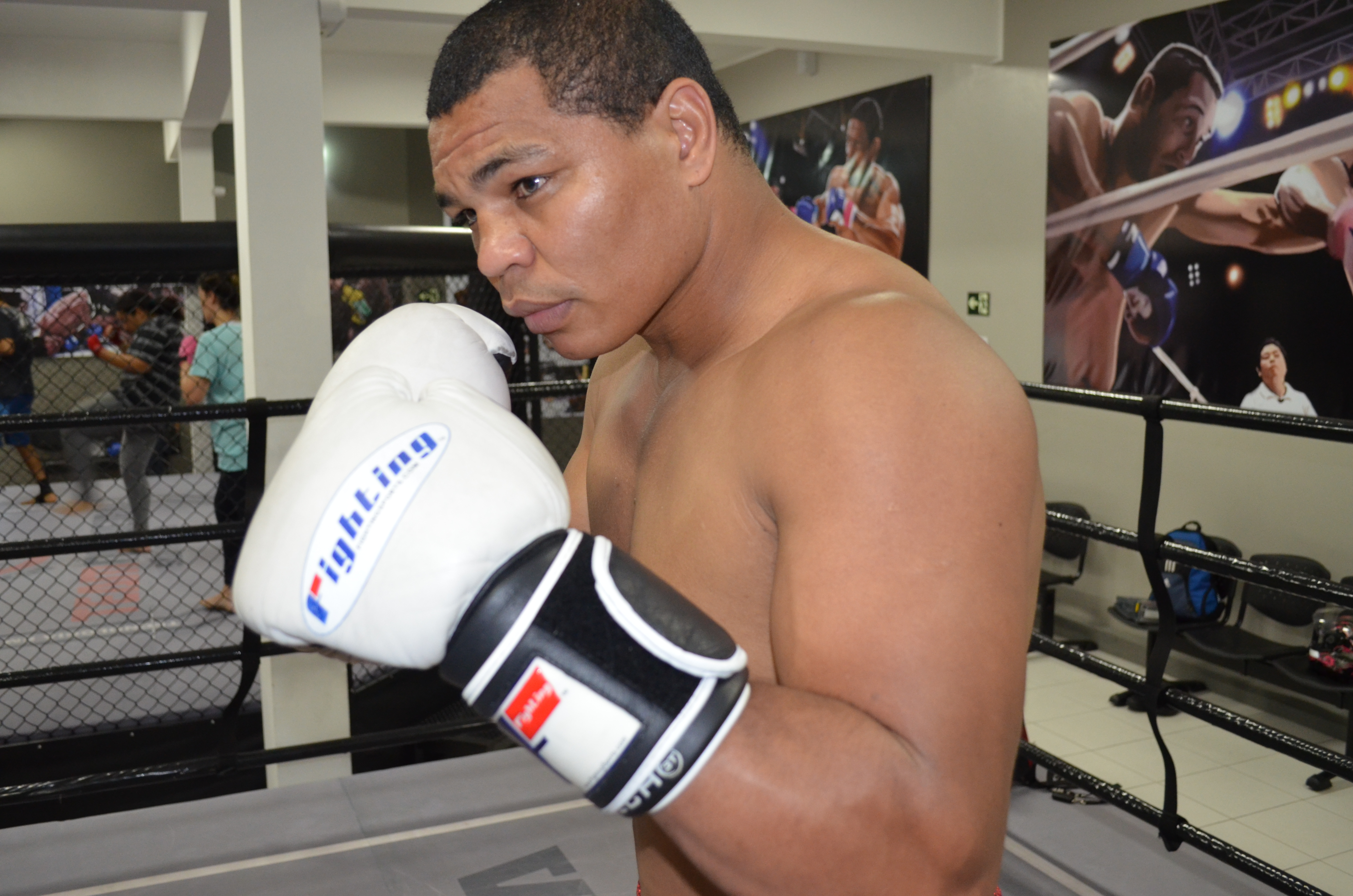

Personal information
- Full name: Laudelino José "Lino" de Barros
- Nationality: Brazil
- Born: June 29, 1975 (age 51) Bonito, Mato Grosso do Sul
- Height: 1.82 m (6 ft 0 in)
- Weight: 81 kg (179 lb)

Sport
- Sport: Boxing
- Weight class: Light Heavyweight
- Club: Osasco
Medal record
Pan American Games
Silver medal – second place	1999 Winnipeg	Light Heavyweight

Laudelino José "Lino" de Barros (born June 29, 1975) is a Brazilian former professional boxer who competed from 2001 to 2016. As an amateur, he represented his native country in the light heavyweight division at the 2000 Summer Olympics. There he was eliminated in the first round by Australia's Danny Green. A year earlier, at the 1999 Pan American Games, Barros won the silver medal in his weight division.

In 2001 he turned pro.
