= Frédéric Serrat =

French boxer

Medal record

Representing France

Men's Boxing

World Amateur Championships
Silver medal – second place	Budapest 1997	Light Heavyweight

Frédéric Serrat (born March 15, 1977, in Grasse, Provence-Alpes-Côte d'Azur) is a French former professional boxer who competed from 1998 to 2005. Serrat's most notable performance as an amateur was winning the silver medal at the 1997 World Amateur Boxing Championships in Budapest, Hungary. There he was defeated in the final by Russia's Aleksandr Lebziak in the light heavyweight division (– 81 kilograms). A year later he turned professional. Serrat last fought in 2005, in a loss by PTS against British boxer Carl Thompson.
