= Sackey Shivute =

Namibian boxer (born 1965)

Sakaria 'Sackey' Shivute (born 10 October 1965) is a Namibian boxer. Shivute competed for Namibia at the 1996 Summer Olympics. Fighting as a middleweight, Shivute lost to Australian Justann Crawford in the first round. He also represented Namibia at the 1994 Commonwealth Games and at the 1995 All-Africa Games, where he won a silver medal.
