= Zsolt Erdei =

Hungarian boxer (born 1974)

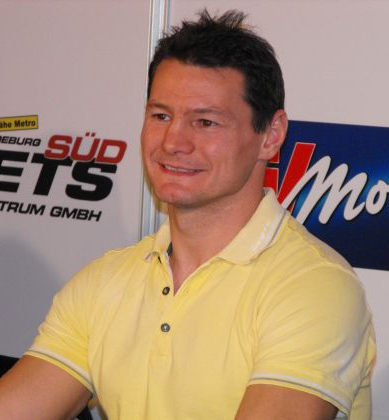
- Erdei in 2009

Personal information
- Nickname: Madár ("Bird")
- Nationality: Hungarian
- Born: 31 May 1974 (age 52) Budapest, Hungarian People's Republic (now Hungary)
- Height: 5 ft 10 in (178 cm)
- Weight: Light heavyweight; Cruiserweight

Boxing career
- Reach: 72 in (183 cm)
- Stance: Orthodox

Boxing record
- Total fights: 35
- Wins: 34
- Win by KO: 18
- Losses: 1
Medal record
Men's Amateur boxing
Representing Hungary
Olympic Games
Bronze medal – third place	2000 Sydney	Middleweight
World Championships
Gold medal – first place	1997 Budapest	Middleweight
European Championships
Gold medal – first place	1998 Minsk	Middleweight
Gold medal – first place	2000 Tampere	Middleweight
Silver medal – second place	1996 Vejle	Middleweight

Zsolt Erdei (born 31 May 1974) is a Hungarian former professional boxer who competed from 2000 to 2014. He held world championships in two weight classes, including the World Boxing Organization (WBO) light-heavyweight title from 2004 to 2009, and the World Boxing Council (WBC) cruiserweight title from 2009 to 2010. Erdei is the first boxer from Hungary to win world titles in two weight divisions. As an amateur, he won a bronze medal in the middleweight division at the 2000 Olympics. He also competed at the 1996 Summer Olympics.

== Amateur career ==
- 1997 World Champion in Budapest
- 1998 and 2000 European Champion
- Representing Hungary, won the Middleweight bronze medal at the 2000 Olympics in Sydney
- Amateur Record: 212–20
- 1996 Olympic Results
  - Defeated Juan Pablo López (Mexico) RSC 3 (2:20)
  - Lost to Malik Beyleroğlu (Turkey) 8–9
- 2000 Olympic Results - Boxed as a Middleweight (75 kg)
  - Defeated Vladislav Vizilter (Kyrgyzstan) RSC-3
  - Defeated Alexander Zubrikhin (Ukraine) 14–9
  - Lost to Gaydarbek Gaydarbekov (Russia) 16–24

== Professional career ==
Erdei turned professional in December 2000 and won the WBO Inter-Continental light heavyweight title in October 2002. On 17 January 2004 Erdei won the Lineal and WBO light heavyweight titles from Julio César González by unanimous decision, and successfully defended the titles eleven times.

On 13 November 2009 he relinquished his WBO light heavyweight title and moved up to cruiserweight. Erdei defeated Giacobbe Fragomeni on 21 November 2009 for the WBC cruiserweight title. Most of Erdei's matches during his professional career were promoted by Universum boxing.

After announcing his retirement in January 2010 and thus relinquishing his claim as Lineal light heavyweight champion, Erdei decided to have more matches in 2011 in the US and fought Samson Onyango and Byron Mitchell as his first opponents there. The Mitchell fight which was set up by Lou DiBella ended with Erdei knocking Mitchell out in the 6th round (TKO).

Erdei finally returned on 30 March 2013, losing a 10-round split decision to Denis Grachev.

After retiring in 2014, Erdei made a comeback at the age of 51 on 20 December 2025, fighting out a six-round draw against 40 year old boxing debutant Attila Vegh in Budapest.

== Professional boxing record ==
35 fights	34 wins	1 loss
By knockout	18	0
By decision	16	1

No.	Result	Record	Opponent	Type	Round, time	Date	Location	Notes
35	Win	34–1	Shalva Jomardashvili	UD	10	9 Mar 2014	Messzi István Sportcsarnok, Kecskemét, Hungary	Won vacant WBO European light-heavyweight title
34	Loss	33–1	Denis Grachev	SD	10	30 Mar 2013	Salle des Etoiles, Monte Carlo, Monaco	
33	Win	33–0	Byron Mitchell	TKO	6 (10), 1:58	4 Jun 2011	Boardwalk Hall, Atlantic City, New Jersey, US	
32	Win	32–0	Samson Onyango	UD	8	20 Nov 2010	Boardwalk Hall, Atlantic City, New Jersey, US	
31	Win	31–0	Giacobbe Fragomeni	MD	12	21 Nov 2009	Sparkassen-Arena, Kiel, Germany	Won WBC cruiserweight title
30	Win	30–0	Yuri Barashian	UD	12	10 Jan 2009	Bördelandhalle, Magdeburg, Germany	Retained WBO light-heavyweight title
29	Win	29–0	DeAndrey Abron	UD	12	26 Apr 2008	Freiberger Arena, Dresden, Germany	Retained WBO light-heavyweight title
28	Win	28–0	Tito Mendoza	SD	12	24 Nov 2007	Freiberger Arena, Dresden, Germany	Retained WBO light-heavyweight title
27	Win	27–0	George Blades	TKO	11 (12), 2:27	16 Jun 2007	SYMA Sports and Conference Centre, Budapest, Hungary	Retained WBO light-heavyweight title
26	Win	26–0	Danny Santiago	TKO	8 (12), 1:55	27 Jan 2007	Burg-Wächter Castello, Düsseldorf, Germany	Retained WBO light-heavyweight title
25	Win	25–0	Thomas Ulrich	UD	12	29 Jul 2006	König Pilsener Arena, Oberhausen, Germany	Retained WBO light-heavyweight title
24	Win	24–0	Paul Murdoch	TKO	10 (12), 0:19	6 May 2006	Burg-Wächter Castello, Düsseldorf, Germany	Retained WBO light-heavyweight title
23	Win	23–0	Mehdi Sahnoune	TKO	12 (12), 2:17	22 Oct 2005	Brandberge Arena, Halle, Germany	Retained WBO light-heavyweight title
22	Win	22–0	Hugo Garay	SD	12	26 Feb 2005	Color Line Arena, Hamburg, Germany	Retained WBO light-heavyweight title
21	Win	21–0	Alejandro Lakatos	UD	12	11 Sep 2004	Kisstadion, Budapest, Hungary	Retained WBO light-heavyweight title
20	Win	20–0	Hugo Garay	MD	12	8 May 2004	Westfalenhallen, Dortmund, Germany	Retained WBO light-heavyweight title
19	Win	19–0	Julio César González	UD	12	17 Jan 2004	Dm-Arena, Karlsruhe, Germany	Won WBO light-heavyweight title
18	Win	18–0	Ramdane Serdjane	KO	1 (8)	15 Nov 2003	Oberfrankenhalle, Bayreuth, Germany	
17	Win	17–0	Juan Nelongo	UD	12	6 Sep 2003	Újszeged Sports Hall, Szeged, Hungary	Retained WBO Inter-Continental light-heavyweight title
16	Win	16–0	Massimiliano Saiani	TKO	7 (12), 2:43	12 Jul 2003	Wilhelm Dopatka Halle, Leverkusen, Germany	Retained WBO Inter-Continental light-heavyweight title
15	Win	15–0	Jose Hilton Dos Santos	TKO	10 (12), 2:45	29 Mar 2003	Color Line Arena, Hamburg, Germany	Retained WBO Inter-Continental light-heavyweight title
14	Win	14–0	Juan Carlos Giménez	TKO	8 (12)	23 Nov 2002	Westfalenhallen, Dortmund, Germany	Retained WBO Inter-Continental light-heavyweight title
13	Win	13–0	Jim Murray	KO	5 (12), 1:58	5 Oct 2002	Főnix Aréna, Debrecen, Hungary	Won vacant WBO Inter-Continental light-heavyweight title
12	Win	12–0	Roberto Coelho	UD	8	17 Aug 2002	Estrel Hotel, Berlin, Germany	
11	Win	11–0	Daren Whitley	UD	6	29 Jun 2002	Etess Arena, Atlantic City, New Jersey, US	
10	Win	10–0	Anthony Stephens	KO	2 (8)	16 Mar 2002	Hanns-Martin-Schleyer-Halle, Stuttgart, Germany	
9	Win	9–0	Jesse Corona	TKO	4 (8)	15 Dec 2001	Estrel Hotel, Berlin, Germany	
8	Win	8–0	Alban Girouard	KO	2 (8), 0:55	3 Nov 2001	Hansehalle, Lübeck, Germany	
7	Win	7–0	Julius Gal	TKO	2 (4)	1 Sep 2001	Berlin, Germany	
6	Win	6–0	Dennis Matthews	TKO	3 (4), 1:18	4 Aug 2001	Mandalay Bay Events Center, Paradise, Nevada, US	
5	Win	5–0	Oleksandr Garashchenko	UD	4	16 Jun 2001	Kisstadion, Budapest, Hungary	
4	Win	4–0	Henry Mobio	KO	4 (4)	7 Apr 2001	Universum Gym, Hamburg, Germany	
3	Win	3–0	Dennis McKinney	UD	4	27 Jan 2001	Rudi-Sedlmayer-Halle, Munich, Germany	
2	Win	2–0	Willie McDonald	TKO	2 (4)	16 Dec 2000	Grugahalle, Essen, Germany	
1	Win	1–0	Philip Houthoofdt	TKO	1 (4)	5 Dec 2000	Universum Gym, Hamburg, Germany	

== Titles in boxing ==
=== Major world titles ===
- WBO light-heavyweight champion (175 lbs)
- WBC cruiserweight champion (200 lbs)

=== Regional/International titles ===
- WBO European light-heavyweight champion (175 lbs)
- WBO Inter-Continental light-heavyweight champion (175 lbs)

== See also ==
- Lineal championship
- List of world light-heavyweight boxing champions
- List of world cruiserweight boxing champions

Sporting positions
Regional boxing titles
Vacant Title last held by Glen Johnson	WBO Inter-Continental light-heavyweight champion 5 October 2002 – 17 January 2004; Won world title	Vacant Title next held by Tomasz Adamek
Vacant Title last held by Jonathan Profichet	WBO European light heavyweight champion 8 March 2014 – November 2014; Vacated	Vacant Title next held by Umar Salamov
World boxing titles
Preceded by Julio César González	WBO light heavyweight champion 17 January 2004 – 13 November 2009; Vacated	Vacant Title next held by Jürgen Brähmer
Preceded by Giacobbe Fragomeni	WBC cruiserweight champion 21 November 2009 – 22 January 2010; Vacated	Vacant Title next held by Krzysztof Wlodarczyk
