= Ilfat Razyapov =

Russian boxer

Ilfat Raziapov
Personal information
- Nationality: Russian
- Born: 23 November 1975 (age 50) Imendyashevo, Bashkir ASSR, Soviet Union

Sport
- Sport: Boxing

Ilfat Sultanovich Raziapov (Russian: Ильфат Султанович Разяпов; also transliterated as Ilfat Razyapov; born 23 November 1975) is a Russian former boxer. He competed in the men's flyweight event at the 2000 Summer Olympics.

== Career ==
- 1996 – Champion of Russia
- 1997 – Silver medalist of the World Championships and champion of Russia
- 1998 – Silver medalist of the European Championships and champion of Russia
- 1999 – Champion of Russia
- 2000 – Competed at the 2000 Summer Olympics in Sydney

Raziapov was also a four-time Russian national champion and a winner of multiple international amateur boxing tournaments.

From 2008 to 2011, Raziapov served as the head of the Department of Theory and Methodology of Boxing at the Ural State University of Physical Culture in Chelyabinsk.

From 2011 to 2019, he served as Chairman of the Boxing Federation of the Republic of Bashkortostan.

== Olympic record ==
Raziapov represented Russia in the men's flyweight division at the 2000 Summer Olympics in Sydney. He received a bye in the opening round and lost his next bout to Vakhtang Darchinyan of Armenia by 20–11, finishing the competition without advancing further.

Olympic results and other contemporary boxing records list his name as Ilfat Raziapov.
