= Azize Raguig =

Moroccan boxer

Personal information
- Nationality: Moroccan
- Born: 23 January 1975 (age 50); Strasbourg, France

Sport
- Sport: Boxing

Azize Raguig (born 23 January 1975) is a Moroccan boxer. He competed in the men's light heavyweight event at the 2000 Summer Olympics.
