= Jegbefumere Albert =

Nigerian boxer

Jegbefumere Albert (born 27 July 1981) is a Nigerian boxer who competed in the light heavyweight division. At the 2000 Summer Olympics, Albert was defeated by Rudolf Kraj from the Czech Republic during the quarterfinal match. In 2002 Commonwealth Games Jegbefumere Albert defeated Joseph Lubega (Ugandan) in the final to win a gold medal for Nigeria.
