= Gurcharan Singh (boxer) =

Indian boxer (born 1977)

Gurcharan Singh Nagar
Personal information
- Nickname: The Storm
- Nationality: India
- Born: 10 April 1977 (age 49) Rurawal Punjab, India
- Height: 1.91 m (6 ft 3 in)
- Weight: Light heavyweight

Boxing career
- Stance: Orthodox

Boxing record
- Total fights: 21
- Wins: 20
- Win by KO: 11
- Losses: 1
- Draws: 0
- No contests: 0

Gurcharan Singh (born 10 April 1977) is an Indian professional boxer born in Rurewal, Punjab, and currently settled in Philadelphia, US.

He competed in the light heavyweight division at the 1996 Summer Olympics in Atlanta and the 2000 Summer Olympics in Sydney. Although he lost in the first round at the 1996 Summer Olympics, Singh excelled his boxing performance at the Sydney games by defeating South Korea's Ki Soo-Choi, and South Africa's Danie Venter in the first two rounds. During the quarterfinal match, Singh made an early lead against Ukraine's Andriy Fedchuk; however, he failed to evade a punch in the last round until Fedchuk drew a sudden death point to end the match. As a result, the judges made a decision to break a deadlock and earned a score of 60–42 to the Ukrainian boxer; therefore, Singh did not advance into the semi-final match.

Gurucharan Singh was last employed as a Naik Subedar in the 17 Sikh Battalion in the Indian Army.

Gurucharan Singh relocated to the US and settled in the boxing town of Philadelphia while pursuing his professional boxing career from 2001 to 2010.

== Olympic results ==
1996 (as a light heavyweight boxer)

- Lost to Enrique Flores (Puerto Rico) 7–15

2000 (as a light heavyweight boxer)

- Defeated Ki Soo-Choi (South Korea) 11–9
- Defeated Danie Venter (South Africa) – won after the referee stopped the fourth and final round in the boxing match
- Lost to Andriy Fedchuk (Ukraine) 12–+12 (lost by a sudden death point)

== Professional boxing ==
After his disappointing loss in the Olympics semifinal to Andriy Fedchuk, which Gurucharan still believes was an unfair result against him due to a sudden death point, 6 months after the Olympic loss while he was training in Czech at a boxing camp he left without informing anyone, only after a while it was realized that he migrated to USA. As he left without informing anyone at workplace or in the Indian Boxing Federation his then employer Indian Army considered him AWOL (Absent Without Official Leave) and faced and inquiry on arrival.

=== Career ===
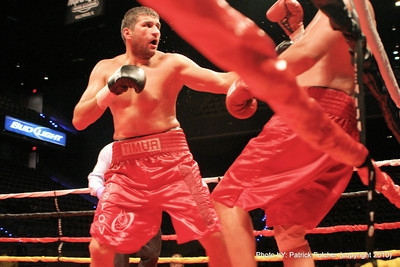
Singh vs. Ibragmiov (left)

In 2001 Gurucharan signed up for Pro Boxing in the United States. His first bout was with a lesser known Derrick Minter which he won in the first round on TKO. He was nicknamed Guru "The Storm" Nagra and had unbeatable run for record 20 straight fights with 11 KO/TKO's before he was stopped in the 10th round by Timur Ibragimov in 2010. Guru was also promoted as "The world's first professional Asian Heavyweight Boxer". In the later part of his professional boxing career Guru suffered various bodily injuries and subsequent surgeries that kept him away from the ring with only professional 4 bouts from 2004 to 2010.

=== Return to India ===
With the AIBA easing its restrictions on professional boxers participating in Olympics or other international boxing events, in 2014 Guru patched up with the Indian Boxing Confederation and the Indian Army and returned to Indian 15 years after he had disappeared with a desire to represent India at the 2016 Rio Olympics.

== Professional boxing record ==
21 fights	20 wins	1 loss
By knockout	11	1
By decision	9	0

No.	Result	Record	Opponent	Type	Round, time	Date	Location	Notes
21	Loss	20–1	Timur Ibragimov	TKO	10 (10), 1:45	24 Aug 2010	Seminole Hard Rock Hotel and Casino, Hollywood, Florida, US	
20	Win	20–0	Aleksandrs Selezens	PTS	6	7 Mar 2009	New Bingley Hall, Birmingham, England	
19	Win	19–0	Colin Kenna	KO	4 (8)	27 Sep 2008	Bracknell Leisure Centre, Bracknell, England	
18	Win	18–0	Mike Miller	UD	6	19 Oct 2007	The Spectrum, Philadelphia, Pennsylvania, US	
17	Win	17–0	Jermell Barnes	MD	10	4 Jun 2004	Tropicana Hotel & Casino, Atlantic City, New Jersey, US	
16	Win	16–0	Charles Brown	UD	6	6 Mar 2004	The Blue Horizon, Philadelphia, Pennsylvania, US	
15	Win	15–0	Cliff Nellon	KO	3 (6), 2:59	9 Dec 2003	Pikesville Armory, Pikesville, Maryland, US	
14	Win	14–0	Scott Jones	UD	6	27 Jun 2003	Tropicana Hotel & Casino, Atlantic City, New Jersey, US	
13	Win	13–0	John Battle	UD	6	6 Jun 2003	Boardwalk Hall, Atlantic City, New Jersey, US	
12	Win	12–0	Alejandro Torres	UD	4	18 Mar 2003	Boardwalk Hall, Atlantic City, New Jersey, US	
11	Win	11–0	Bryan Blakely	TKO	1 (4)	31 Jan 2003	Tropicana Hotel & Casino, Atlantic City, New Jersey, US	
10	Win	10–0	Francisco Pena	TKO	2 (4)	13 Dec 2002	World Fitness Center, Philadelphia, Pennsylvania, US	
9	Win	9–0	Andrew Hutchinson	UD	4	9 Aug 2002	Tropicana Hotel & Casino, Atlantic City, New Jersey, US	
8	Win	8–0	Donald Colbert	KO	2 (?)	22 Jun 2002	Sovereign Center, Reading, Pennsylvania, US	
7	Win	7–0	Phil Ford	TKO	1 (?), 2:35	26 Apr 2002	Holiday Inn, Rutland, Vermont, US	
6	Win	6–0	Jesse Oltmanns	TKO	1 (6)	16 Mar 2002	Fernwood Resort, Bushkill, Pennsylvania, US	
5	Win	5–0	Thomas Talley	TKO	1 (?)	18 Jan 2002	Sports Arena, Raleigh, North Carolina, US	
4	Win	4–0	Forrest McFarland	TKO	2 (4)	19 Dec 2001	Essington, Pennsylvania, US	
3	Win	3–0	Benny Garcia	TKO	1 (4)	9 Nov 2001	The Blue Horizon, Philadelphia, Pennsylvania, US	
2	Win	2–0	Jerry Arentzen	PTS	4	28 Apr 2001	Pottstown, Pennsylvania, US	
1	Win	1–0	Derrick Minter	TKO	1 (?)	24 Mar 2001	Pottstown, Pennsylvania, US	
