= Claudio Rîșco =

Romanian boxer

Claudio Rîşco
Personal information
- Full name: Grigore Claudio Rîşco
- Nickname: Claudio Rasco
- Nationality: (Romania) Romanian
- Born: August 22, 1978 (age 47) Sighetu Marmaţiei, Maramureş
- Height: 196 cm (6 ft 5 in)
- Weight: 81 kg (179 lb)

Sport
- Sport: Boxing
- Weight class: Heavyweight
Medal record
World Amateur Championships
Bronze medal – third place	2001 Belfast	Light Heavyweight
European Amateur Championships
Silver medal – second place	2000 Tampere	Light Heavyweight
Bronze medal – third place	1998 Minsk	Light Heavyweight

Grigore Claudio Rîşco (born August 22, 1978), also known as Claudio Rasco, is a retired Romanian boxer.

== Amateur ==
The 196 cm (6 ft 5 in) Rasco won the bronze medal at the European Championships 1998 in Minsk, 2000 the silver medal losing to Russian Aleksandr Lebziak at the 2000 European Amateur Boxing Championships. At the 2001 World Amateur Boxing Championships he won the bronze medal in Belfast.

== Pro ==
Rasco turned pro in Canada to fight as a Heavyweight. He lost his pro debut but upset heavyweight David Cadieux in his pro debut. In 2005 he lost his bid for the Canadian Cruiserweight title against Troy Ross by stoppage and was KOd in 2006 by undefeated German Cruiserweight prospect Marco Huck.

== Professional boxing record ==
13 fights	10 wins	3 losses
By knockout	3	2
By decision	7	1

No.	Result	Record	Opponent	Method	Round, time	Date	Location	Notes
13	Win	10–3	(Barbados) Curtis Murray	KO	5 (6), 2:20	June 23, 2006	(Canada) Docks Entertainment Complex, Toronto, Ontario	
12	Loss	9–3	(Germany) Marco Huck	KO	7 (8), 2:15	Jan 28, 2006	(Germany) Tempodrom, Kreuzberg	
11	Win	9–2	(United States) Harold Sconiers	TKO	5 (8), 3:00	Nov 12, 2005	(Canada) Montreal Casino, Montreal, Quebec	
10	Win	8–2	(United States) John Battle	UD	8	Oct 15, 2005	(Canada) Montreal Casino, Montreal, Quebec	
9	Win	7–2	(United States) Sebastian Hill	UD	6	Sep 10, 2005	(Canada) Montreal Casino, Montreal, Quebec	
8	Loss	6–2	(Canada) Troy Ross	TKO	8 (10), 1:25	May 28, 2005	(Canada) Casino Lac Leamy, Hull, Quebec	For Vacant CBF Cruiserweight Title
7	Win	6–1	(Brazil) Daniel Bispo	UD	6	April 9, 2005	(Canada) Montreal Casino, Montreal, Quebec	
6	Win	5–1	(United States) Cliff Nellon	UD	6	Mar 12, 2005	(Canada) Montreal Casino, Montreal, Quebec	
5	Win	4–1	(United States) Larry Robinson	UD	4	Feb 26, 2005	(Canada) Casino Lac Leamy, Hull, Quebec	
4	Win	3–1	(United States) Jesse Corona	UD	4	Nov 13, 2004	(Canada) Montreal Casino, Montreal, Quebec	
3	Win	2–1	(Canada) David Cadieux	SD	4	Sep 29, 2004	(Canada) Club Soda, Montreal, Quebec	
2	Win	1–1	(Canada) Mark Newton	KO	3 (4), 1:15	Sep 9, 2004	(Canada) Fort Garry Place, Winnipeg, Manitoba	
1	Loss	0–1	(Cameroon) Paul Mbongo	MD	4	April 17, 2004	(Canada) Hershey Centre, Mississauga, Ontario	Professional debut
