= Courtney Fry =

English boxer

Personal information
- Nationality: British
- Born: 19 May 1975 (age 51) Enfield, London, England
- Height: 6 ft 1 1/2 in (187 cm)
- Weight: Light-heavyweight; Cruiserweight

Boxing career
- Club: Salisbury ABC, Liverpool
- Reach: 73 in (185 cm)
- Stance: Orthodox

Boxing record
- Total fights: 27
- Wins: 19
- Win by KO: 6
- Losses: 8
Medal record
Men's Boxing
Representing England
Commonwealth Games
Gold medal – first place	1998 Kuala Lumpur	Light-heavyweight

Courtney Fry (born 19 May 1975) is a British former boxer who competed professionally from 2003 to 2015. As an amateur, he won a gold medal at the 1998 Commonwealth Games and represented Great Britain at the 2000 Sydney Olympics. As a professional, he challenged once for the British, and Commonwealth light-heavyweight titles in 2009.

== Amateur career ==
In addition to competing at the Olympic Games he represented England and won a gold medal in the light heavyweight 81 kg division, at the 1998 Commonwealth Games in Kuala Lumpur, Malaysia.

Four years later, Fry represented the 2002 English team at the 2002 Commonwealth Games in Manchester, England, where he competed in the light-heavyweight division, where he beat Bertrand Tietsia of Cameroon before losing to Jegbefumere Albert of Nigeria in the quarter-final bout.

== Professional boxing record ==
27 fights	19 wins	8 losses
By knockout	6	3
By decision	13	5

No.	Result	Record	Opponent	Type	Round, time	Date	Location	Notes
27	Loss	19–8	(Republic of Ireland) Tommy McCarthy	PTS	8	1 Aug 2015	(United Kingdom) Falls Park, Belfast, Northern Ireland	
26	Loss	19–7	(United Kingdom) Craig Kennedy	UD	10	19 Jun 2015	(United Kingdom) Newport Centre, Newport, Wales	
25	Win	19–6	(United Kingdom) Jon-Lewis Dickinson	PTS	10	29 Nov 2014	(United Kingdom) Gateshead Leisure Centre, Gateshead, England	
24	Loss	18–6	(United States) Roy Jones Jr.	RTD	5 (12), 3:00	26 Jul 2014	Kipsala Exhibition Centre, Riga, Latvia	
23	Loss	18–5	(United Kingdom) Nathan King	PTS	4	24 May 2014	(United Kingdom) Deeside Leisure Centre, Queensferry, Wales	
22	Loss	18–4	(United Kingdom) Enzo Maccarinelli	TKO	7 (10), 1:46	7 Dec 2013	(United Kingdom) Echo Arena, Liverpool, England	
21	Win	18–3	(United Kingdom) Matty Clarkson	PTS	6	12 Oct 2012	(United Kingdom) Bowlers Exhibition Centre, Manchester, England	
20	Win	17–3	(United Kingdom) Carl Wild	PTS	6	30 Jun 2012	(United Kingdom) Olympia, Liverpool, England	
19	Win	16–3	(United Kingdom) Jody Meikle	PTS	4	3 Feb 2012	(United Kingdom) Bowlers Exhibition Centre, Manchester, England	
18	Win	15–3	(United Kingdom) Simeon Cover	TKO	5 (6), 2:58	18 Dec 2011	(United Kingdom) De Vere Whites Hotel, Bolton, England	
17	Win	14–3	(United Kingdom) Jamie Ambler	PTS	6	30 Sep 2011	(United Kingdom) Olympia, Liverpool, England	
16	Loss	13–3	(United Kingdom) Nathan Cleverly	TKO	8 (12), 2:51	9 Sep 2009	(United Kingdom) York Hall, London, England	For British, and Commonwealth light-heavyweight titles
15	Loss	13–2	(United Kingdom) Tony Oakey	UD	3	20 Feb 2009	(United Kingdom) York Hall, London, England	Prizefighter: The Light-heavyweights – Semi-final
14	Win	13–1	(United Kingdom) Shon Davies	UD	3	20 Feb 2009	(United Kingdom) York Hall, London, England	Prizefighter: The Light-heavyweights – Quarter-final
13	Win	12–1	(Latvia) Jevgēņijs Andrejevs	PTS	6	10 Oct 2008	(United Kingdom) Café Royal, London, England	
12	Win	11–1	(Niger) Tony Salam	KO	6 (8), 1:07	1 Feb 2008	(United Kingdom) York Hall, London, England	
11	Win	10–1	(Kenya) Nick Okoth	TKO	1 (6), 1:43	21 Sep 2007	(United Kingdom) York Hall, London, England	
10	Win	9–1	(Ukraine) Vasyl Kondor	PTS	6	7 Apr 2006	(United Kingdom) Whitchurch Sports Centre, Bristol, England	
9	Loss	8–1	(United Kingdom) Ovill McKenzie	PTS	4	13 May 2005	(United Kingdom) Everton Park Sports Centre, Liverpool, England	
8	Win	8–0	(Armenia) Varujan Davtyan	RTD	2 (6), 3:00	17 Dec 2004	(United Kingdom) Everton Park Sports Centre, Liverpool, England	
7	Win	7–0	(Guadeloupe) Valery Odin	PTS	8	19 Jun 2004	(United Kingdom) Alexandra Palace, London, England	
6	Win	6–0	(United Kingdom) Radcliffe Green	PTS	6	8 May 2004	(United Kingdom) Whitchurch Sports Centre, Bristol, England	
5	Win	5–0	(Portugal) Paulino Da Silva	PTS	4	2 Apr 2004	(United Kingdom) Plymouth Marjon University, Plymouth, England	
4	Win	4–0	(United Kingdom) Clint Johnson	TKO	2 (6), 2:28	20 Mar 2004	(United Kingdom) Wembley Arena, London, England	
3	Win	3–0	(United Kingdom) Ovill McKenzie	PTS	4	24 Oct 2003	(United Kingdom) York Hall, London, England	
2	Win	2–0	(United Kingdom) Darren Ashton	PTS	4	31 May 2003	(United Kingdom) York Hall, London, England	
1	Win	1–0	(United Kingdom) Harry Butler	TKO	3 (4)	29 Mar 2003	(United Kingdom) Wembley Conference Centre, London, England	
