= Isael Álvarez =

Cuban boxer

Personal information
- Nationality: Cuban
- Born: 2 February 1974 (age 52)

Sport
- Sport: Boxing
Medal record
Men's amateur boxing
Representing Cuba
Goodwill Games
Gold medal – first place	1998 New York	Light Heavyweight

Isael Álvarez (born 2 February 1974) is a Cuban boxer. He competed in the men's light heavyweight event at the 2000 Summer Olympics.
