= Malaysia at the 1998 Asian Games =

- IOC code: MAS
- NOC: Olympic Council of Malaysia
- Website: www.olympic.org.my (in English)

in Bangkok
- Competitors: 134 in 18 sports
- Medals Ranked 12th: Gold 5 Silver 10 Bronze 14 Total 29

Asian Games appearances (overview)
- 1954; 1958; 1962; 1966; 1970; 1974; 1978; 1982; 1986; 1990; 1994; 1998; 2002; 2006; 2010; 2014; 2018; 2022; 2026

Other related appearances
- North Borneo (1954, 1958, 1962); Sarawak (1962)

Malaysia competed in the 1998 Asian Games in Bangkok, Thailand from 6 to 20 December 1998. Malaysia ended the games at 29 overall medals. Its chef-de-mission was Zakaria Ahmad.

== Medal summary ==
=== Medals by sport ===
| Sport | Gold | Silver | Bronze | Total | Rank |
|---|---|---|---|---|---|
| Badminton | 0 | 0 | 2 | 2 | 6 |
| Cue sports | 1 | 1 | 0 | 2 | 4 |
| Equestrian | 0 | 1 | 1 | 2 | 4 |
| Karate | 2 | 0 | 4 | 6 | 2 |
| Sailing | 0 | 3 | 0 | 3 | 8 |
| Sepaktakraw | 0 | 2 | 1 | 3 | 3 |
| Squash | 1 | 0 | 1 | 2 | 2 |
| Swimming | 1 | 1 | 1 | 3 | 4 |
| Taekwondo | 0 | 1 | 1 | 2 | 10 |
| Wushu | 0 | 1 | 1 | 2 | 7 |
| Total | 5 | 10 | 14 | 29 | 12 |

=== Multiple medalists ===
Malaysian competitors that have won at least two medals.

| Name | Sport | Gold | Silver | Bronze | Total |
|---|---|---|---|---|---|
| Alex Lim | Swimming | 1 | 1 | | 2 |
| Sam Chong | Cue sports | 1 | 1 | | 2 |
| Yong Hock Kin | Badminton | | | 2 | 2 |

=== Medallists ===
| Medal | Name | Sport | Event |
|---|---|---|---|
| Gold | Ooi Chin Kay; Sam Chong | Cue sports | Men's snooker doubles |
| Gold | Muralitharan Chandra | Karate | Men's kumite 55 kg |
| Gold | Muniandy Rajoo | Karate | Men's kumite 70 kg |
| Gold | Nicol David | Squash | Women's singles |
| Gold | Alex Lim | Swimming | Men's 100 metre backstroke |
| Silver | Sam Chong | Cue sports | Men's snooker singles |
| Silver | Nur Quzandria Mahamad Fathil; Qabil Ambak Mahamad Fathil; Syed Omar Al-Mohdzar; Wan Zaleha Radzi | Equestrian | Team dressage |
| Silver | Mohd Nazmi Sharif | Sailing | Men's optimist |
| Silver | Kevin Lim | Sailing | Men's laser |
| Silver | Malik Sulaiman | Sailing | Super Moth |
| Silver | | Sepaktakraw | Men's regu |
| Silver | | Sepaktakraw | Men's team |
| Silver | Alex Lim | Swimming | Men's 200 metre backstroke |
| Silver | Lee Wan Yuen | Taekwondo | Women's +70 kg |
| Silver | Oh Poh Soon | Wushu | Men's changquan |
| Bronze | Yong Hock Kin | Badminton | Men's singles |
| Bronze | Chan Chong Ming; Cheah Soon Thoe; James Chua; Jeremy Gan; Roslin Hashim; Pang Cheh Chang; Wong Choong Hann; Yong Hock Kin | Badminton | Men's team |
| Bronze | Sarah Yap | Bowling | Women's singles |
| Bronze | Quzier Ambak Mahamad Fathil | Equestrian | Individual jumping |
| Bronze | Arivalagan Ponniah | Karate | Men's kumite 75 kg |
| Bronze | Suresh Rao Subramaniam | Karate | Men's kumite +75 kg |
| Bronze | Lim Lee Lee | Karate | Women's individual kata |
| Bronze | Premila Supramaniam | Karate | Women's kumite +60 kg |
| Bronze | | Sepaktakraw | Men's circle |
| Bronze | Kenneth Low | Squash | Men's singles |
| Bronze | Elvin Chia | Swimming | Men's 100 metre breaststroke |
| Bronze | Soo Lai Yin | Taekwondo | Women's 55 kg |
| Bronze | Ho Ro Bin | Wushu | Men's nanquan |

== Athletics ==
Key

- Note–Ranks given for track events are within the athlete's heat only
- Q = Qualified for the next round
- q = Qualified for the next round as a fastest loser or, in field events, by position without achieving the qualifying target
- NR = National record
- N/A = Round not applicable for the event
- Bye = Athlete not required to compete in round

Men
Track events

| Athlete | Event | Round 1 | | Semifinal | | Final | |
| Athlete | Event | Time | Rank | Time | Rank | Time | Rank |
|---|---|---|---|---|---|---|---|
| Watson Nyambek | 100 m | 10.25 | 1 Q | | | 11.41 | 4 |
| Romzi Bakar | 400 m | 47.69 | 3 q | 47.73 | 5 | Did not advance | |
| Yazid Parlan | 400 m | 48.37 | 3 q | 48.41 | 8 | Did not advance | |
| Teoh Boon Lim | 20 km road walk | —N/a | | | | Disqualified | |
| Govindasamy Saravanan | 50 km road walk | —N/a | | | | Did not finish | |
| Teoh Boon Lim | 50 km road walk | —N/a | | | | 4:45:36 | 5 |
| | 4 × 400 m relay | | | 3:09.01 | 4 q | 3:10.31 | 8 |

Field event

| Athlete | Event | Qualification | | Final | |
| Athlete | Event | Distance | Rank | Distance | Rank |
|---|---|---|---|---|---|
| Loo Kum Zee | High jump | —N/a | | 2.19 | 14 |

Women
Track and road events

| Athlete | Event | Round 1 | | Semifinal | | Final | |
| Athlete | Event | Time | Rank | Time | Rank | Time | Rank |
|---|---|---|---|---|---|---|---|
| Shanti Govindasamy | 100 m | 11.47 | 3 Q | —N/a | | 11.41 | 4 |
| Shanti Govindasamy | 200 m | 23.56 | 2 Q | —N/a | | 23.42 | 4 |
| Yuan Yufang | 10,000 m track walk | —N/a | | | | 45:33.92 | 4 |

== Badminton ==
| Athlete | Event | Round of 32 | Round of 16 | Quarterfinal | Semifinal | Final | |
| Athlete | Event | Opposition Score | Opposition Score | Opposition Score | Opposition Score | Opposition Score | Rank |
|---|---|---|---|---|---|---|---|
| Roslin Hashim | Men's singles | Ng Wei (HKG); W 15–9, 15–7 | Boonsak Ponsana (THA); W 15–8, 11–15, 17–16 | Hendrawan (INA); L 11–15, 6–15 | Did not advance | | |
| Yong Hock Kin (2) | Men's singles | Bye | Tam Kai Chuen (HKG); W 17–14, 15–5 | Pullela Gopichand (IND); W 15–7, 15–4 | Dong Jiong (CHN); L 5–15, 10–15 | Did not advance | 3rd place, bronze medalist(s) |
| Chan Chong Ming; Jeremy Gan | Men's doubles | Fumihiko Machida; Seiichi Watanabe (JPN); W 15–12, 15–9 | Lee Wei-jen; Horng Shin-jeng (TPE); W 15–12, 14–17, 15–10 | Pramote Teerawiwatana; Siripong Siripool (THA); L 7–15, 15–13, 4–15 | Did not advance | | |
| Ng Mee Fen | Women's singles | Koon Wai Chee (HKG); W 10–13, 11–7, 11–6 | Aparna Popat (IND); W 11–7, 11–8 | Gong Zhichao (CHN); L 7–11, 3–11 | Did not advance | | |
| Woon Sze Mei | Women's singles | Chan Ya-lin (TPE); L 2–11, 2–11 | Did not advance | | | | |
| Joanne Quay; Law Pei Pei | Women's doubles | —N/a | Ra Kyung-min; Chung Jae-hee (KOR); L 2–15, 4–15 | Did not advance | | | |
| Lim Pek Siah; Chor Hooi Yee | Women's doubles | —N/a | Sathinee Chankrachangwong; Mathinee Naraweerawut (THA); L 4–15, 8–15 | Did not advance | | | |
| Chan Chong Ming; Joanne Quay | Mixed doubles | Kennevic Asuncion; Amparo Lim (PHI); W 15–0, 15–11 | Budi Santoso; Meiluawati (INA); W 15–10, 15–5 | Kim Dong-moon; Ra Kyung-min (KOR); L 3–15, 4–15 | Did not advance | | |
| Wong Choong Hann; Chor Hooi Yee | Mixed doubles | Chang Jeng-shyuang; Chen Li-chin (TPE); W 12–15, 15–13, 15–11 | Lee Dong-soo; Yim Kyung-jin (KOR); L 2–15, 7–15 | Did not advance | | | |

Men's team
Quarterfinal

| 9 December | Chinese Taipei | 1–4 | Malaysia |

| Chen Feng | 0–2 | Yong Hock Kin | 13–15, 11–15 |
| Horng Shin-jeng / Lee Wei-jen | 2–1 | Pang Cheh Chang / Cheah Soon Thoe | 15–10, 5–15, 12–15 |
| Lee Mou-chou | 0–2 | Roslin Hashim | 7–15, 9–15 |
| Lee Sung-yuan / Lin Wei-hsiang | 0–2 | Chan Chong Ming / Jeremy Gan | 14–17, 6–15 |
| Chien Yu-hsiu | 0–2 | Wong Choong Hann | 15–10, 15–9 |

Semifinal

| 10 December | Indonesia | 4–1 | Malaysia |

| Hendrawan | 2–0 | Yong Hock Kin | 15–4, 15–7 |
| Ricky Subagja / Rexy Mainaky | 2–0 | Pang Cheh Chang / Cheah Soon Thoe | 15–5, 15–5 |
| Taufik Hidayat | 0–2 | Roslin Hashim | 10–15, 14–17 |
| Candra Wijaya / Tony Gunawan | 2–0 | Chan Chong Ming / Jeremy Gan | 15–5, 15–4 |
| Budi Santoso | 2–0 | Wong Choong Hann | 15–9, 15–9 |

Ranked 3rd in final standings

Women's team
Quarterfinal

| 8 December | Malaysia | 0–5 | Indonesia |

| Woon Sze Mei | 0–2 | Mia Audina | 1–11, 2–11 |
| Lim Pek Siah / Chor Hooi Yee | 0–2 | Eliza Nathanael / Deyana Lomban | 6–15, 10–15 |
| Lee Yin Yin | 0–2 | Meiluawati | 3–11, 2–11 |
| Law Pei Pei / Joanne Quay | 0–2 | Indarti Isolina / Carmelita | 0–15, 1–15 |
| Ng Mee Fen | 0–2 | Cindana Hartono | 3–15, 7–15 |

== Bowling ==
Women

| Athlete | Event | Final | |
| Athlete | Event | Result | Rank |
|---|---|---|---|
| Sarah Yap | Singles | | 3rd place, bronze medalist(s) |
| Low Poh Lian | Masters | 1524 | 15 |

== Boxing ==
| Athlete | Event | Round of 32 | Round of 16 | Quarterfinal | Semifinal | Final | |
| Athlete | Event | Opposition Score | Opposition Score | Opposition Score | Opposition Score | Opposition Score | Rank |
|---|---|---|---|---|---|---|---|
| Rakib Ahmad | Men's flyweight (51 kg) | Bye | Bulat Zhumadilov (KAZ); L 9–20 | Did not advance | | | |
| Adnan Yusoh | Men's bantamweight (54 kg) | Bye | Ihab Tafesh (PLE); W RSC | Sontaya Wongprates (THA); L 6–19 | Did not advance | | |
| Muruguthevan Balakrishnan | Men's lightweight (60 kg) | —N/a | Asghar Ali Shah (PAK); L 2–5 | Did not advance | | | |

== Cue sports ==
Men

| Athlete | Event | Preliminary | Round of 32 | Round of 16 | Quarterfinals | Semifinals | Final | Rank |
| Athlete | Event | Opposition Score | Opposition Score | Opposition Score | Opposition Score | Opposition Score | Opposition Score | Rank |
|---|---|---|---|---|---|---|---|---|
| Ewin Lean Kam Beng | English billiards singles | —N/a | | Praput Chaithanasakun (THA); L 0–3 | Did not advance | | | |
| Moh Loon Hong | English billiards singles | —N/a | | Mongkol Kanfaklang (THA); L 0–3 | Did not advance | | | |
| Lee Thye Hong; Ooi Chin Kay | English billiards doubles | —N/a | | Mikhail Kim; Bahtiyor Umarov (UZB); W | Devendra Joshi; Balchandra Bhaskar (IND); L 0–3 | Did not advance | | |
| Moh Loon Hong; Ewin Lean Kam Beng | English billiards doubles | —N/a | | Kohobala Sirisama; Sabdeen Shaharwardi (SRI); W 3–0 | Reynaldo Grandea; Ricardo Ancaja (PHI); L 1–3 | Did not advance | | |
| Tan Kah Thiam; Chew Lean Teng | Eight-ball doubles | —N/a | | Chong Wei Onn; Tan Lai Huat (SIN); W 7–6 | Yang Ching-shun; Chao Fong-pang (TPE); L 3–9 | Did not advance | | |
| Ng Aun Seng; Ooi Fuk Yuen | Eight-ball doubles | —N/a | | Kuniko Takahashi; Satoshi Kawabata (JPN); L 2–7 | Romeo Villanueva; Gandy Valle (PHI); L 10–11 | Did not advance | | |
| Ng Aun Seng | Nine-ball singles | —N/a | | Chatchawan Ruptae (THA); L 6–9 | Did not advance | | | |
| Ooi Fuk Yuen | Nine-ball singles | —N/a | | Morishima Mitsuyoshi (JPN); L 7–9 | Did not advance | | | |
| Ng Aun Seng; Ooi Fuk Yuen | Nine-ball doubles | —N/a | | Lin Didi; Zhang Kai (CHN); W 9–8 | Romeo Villanueva; Gandy Valle (PHI); L 10–11 | Did not advance | | |
| Tan Kah Thiam; Chong Tin Sam | Nine-ball doubles | —N/a | | Mikhail Kim; Bahtiyor Umarov (UZB); W | Kuniko Takahashi; Morishima Mitsuyoshi (JPN); L 5–9 | Did not advance | | |
| Ooi Chin Kay | Snooker singles | Bye | Jamsran Enkhlur (MGL); W 5–0 | Marco Fu (HKG); W 5–3 | Mohammed Al-Hashemi (IND); W 5–2 | Shokat Ali (PAK); L 5–6 | Bronze medal match Chan Kwok Ming (HKG); L 0–5 | 4 |
| Sam Chong | Snooker singles | Bye | Bernard Tey Choon Kiat (SIN); W 5–4 | Hung Chung Ming (TPE); W 5–2 | Yashin Merchant (IND); W 5–4 | Chan Kwok Ming (HKG); W 6–2 | Gold medal match Shokat Ali (PAK); L 6–7 | 2nd place, silver medalist(s) |
| Sam Chong; Ooi Chin Kay | Snooker doubles | —N/a | | | | | Gold medal match Phaitoon Phonbun; Noppadon Noppachorn (THA); W 6–4 | 1st place, gold medalist(s) |
| Sam Chong; Ooi Chin Kay | Snooker team | —N/a | | Mongolia (MGL); W 3–0 | Singapore (SIN); W 2–1 | Thailand (THA); L 1–2 | Bronze medal match Pakistan (PAK); L 1–2 | 4 |

== Cycling ==
=== Road ===
| Athlete | Event | Time | Rank |
|---|---|---|---|
| Nor Effandy Rosli | Men's road race | 4:41:21 | 8 |
| Shahrulneeza Razali | Men's road race | 4:59:32 | 26 |
| Mohd Mahazir Hamad | Men's road race | 4:59:32 | 29 |

== Equestrian ==
Dressage

| Athlete | Horse | Event | Qualification | | Final | |
| Athlete | Horse | Event | Result | Rank | Result | Rank |
|---|---|---|---|---|---|---|
| Nur Quzandria Mahamad Fathil | ?? | Individual dressage | | | Did not advance | |
| Qabil Ambak Mahamad Fathil | Pizazz Girande; Camelias | Individual dressage | 1108 | 5 Q | 1179 | 5 |
| Syed Omar Al-Mohdzar | Jirlow | Individual dressage | 1100 | 6 Q | 1093 | 13 |
| Wan Zaleha Radzi | Chagall Junior | Individual dressage | 1066 | 8 Q | 1114 | 8 |
| Nur Quzandria Mahamad Fathil; Qabil Ambak Mahamad Fathil; Syed Omar Al-Mohdzar; Wan Zaleha Radzi | ??; Pizazz Girande; Jirlow; Chagall Junior; | Team dressage | —N/a | | 3274 | 2nd place, silver medalist(s) |

Jumping

| Athlete | Horse | Event | Qualification | | Final | |
| Athlete | Horse | Event | Result | Rank | Result | Rank |
|---|---|---|---|---|---|---|
| Koh Thong Hau | Roberto Bold | Individual jumping | 55.50 | 20 Q | 52.50 | 32 |
| Qabil Ambak Mahamad Fathil | San Patrignano | Individual jumping | 71.00 | 6 Q | 104.00 | 6 |
| Quzier Ambak Mahamad Fathil | Heros | Individual jumping | 78.50 | 3 Q | 121.00 | 3rd place, bronze medalist(s) |
| Tunku Mokhsin | Domingo | Individual jumping | 44.50 | 25 Q | 54.50 | 31 |
| Koh Thong Hau; Qabil Ambak Mahamad Fathil; Quzier Ambak Mahamad Fathil; Tunku Mokhsin | Roberto Bold; San Patrignano; Heros; Domingo; | Team jumping | 96.00 | 4 Q | 159.50 | 4 |

Eventing

| Athlete | Horse | Event | Penalties | | | Total | Rank |
| Athlete | Horse | Event | Dressage | Cross-country | Jumping | Total | Rank |
|---|---|---|---|---|---|---|---|
| Tunku Nazroff | Sprite | Individual eventing | 80.40 | 0.00 | 5.00 | 85.40 | 9 |
| Husref Malek | McPherson | Individual eventing | 124.80 | 0.00 | 10.00 | 134.80 | 13 |
| Ashraff Denal Ali | Deutsche Mark | Individual eventing | 81.80 | WD | – | 1000.00 | – |
| James Ravindra | Alf | Individual eventing | 62.60 | EL | – | 1000.00 | – |
| Tunku Nazroff; Husref Malek; Ashraff Denal Ali; James Ravindra | Sprite; McPherson; Deutsche Mark; Alf; | Team eventing | 267.80 | 937.40 | 15.00 | 1220.20 | 4 |

== Field hockey ==
=== Men's tournament ===
| Squad list | Pool matches | | Semifinal | Final | Rank |
| Squad list | Opposition Score | Rank | Opposition Score | Opposition Score | Rank |
|---|---|---|---|---|---|
| | Japan; T 1–1; Hong Kong; W 9–0; Pakistan; L 1–2; Singapore; W 6–0 | | Did not advance | | |

== Gymnastics ==
=== Rhythmic ===
Women

| Athlete | Event | | | | | | |
| Athlete | Event | Rope Rank | Hoop Rank | Clubs Rank | Ribbon Rank | Total | Rank |
|---|---|---|---|---|---|---|---|
| Carolyn Au Yong | Individual all-around | | | | | 37.023 | 13 |

== Karate ==
Men
Kumite

| Athlete | Event | Round of 16 | Quarterfinal | Semifinal | Final | |
| Athlete | Event | Opposition Score | Opposition Score | Opposition Score | Opposition Score | Rank |
|---|---|---|---|---|---|---|
| Muralitharan Chandra | 55 kg | Ho Pak Chun (MAC); W 6–0 | Muhammed Shukri Masri (BRU); W 6–0 | Isfan Tanjung (INA); W 6–5 | Gold medal match Bader Al-Otaibi (KUW); W 6–1 | 1st place, gold medalist(s) |
| Puvaneswaran Ramasamy | 60 kg | Arif Taufan Syamsuddin (INA); L 0–6 | Did not advance | | | |
| Muniandy Rajoo | 70 kg | Dipak Shrestha (NEP); W 6–0 | Vu Quoc Huy (VIE); W 6–5 | Raafat Al-Karad (SYR); W 6–2 | Gold medal match Mehdi Amouzadeh (IRI); W 6–1 | 1st place, gold medalist(s) |
| Arivalagan Ponniah | 75 kg | Sadullo Kosimov (TJK); W 2–0 | Liao Yun-chih (TPE); W 2–2 | Alireza Katiraei (IRI); L 1–11 | Bronze medal match Osama Ali (SYR); W 3–1 | 3rd place, bronze medalist(s) |
| Suresh Rao Subramaniam | +75 kg | Krishna Gurung (NEP); W 3–2 | Nour Shamseh (SYR); W 2–1 | | Bronze medal match Moukhammad Bodakov (TJK); W 6–2 | 3rd place, bronze medalist(s) |

Women
Kata

| Athlete | Event | Qualification | | Final | |
| Athlete | Event | Result | Rank | Result | Rank |
|---|---|---|---|---|---|
| Lim Lee Lee | Individual kata | 36.2 | 3 Q | 41.5 | 3rd place, bronze medalist(s) |

Kumite

| Athlete | Event | Round of 16 | Quarterfinal | Semifinal | Final | |
| Athlete | Event | Opposition Score | Opposition Score | Opposition Score | Opposition Score | Rank |
|---|---|---|---|---|---|---|
| Ng Chai Lin | 53 kg | | Lamis Al-Sabsabi (SYR); L 0–2 | Did not advance | | |
| Lim Lee Lee | 60 kg | | | Tham Pham Hong (VIE); L 1–3 | Bronze medal match Phetlada Ausabay (THA); L 1–2 | 4 |
| Premila Supramaniam | +60 kg | | Natalya Solodilova (KAZ); W 6–3 | Panadda Tamchuchaichana (THA); L 2–3 | | 3rd place, bronze medalist(s) |

== Sailing ==
Men

| Athlete | Event | Final | |
| Athlete | Event | Net points | Rank |
|---|---|---|---|
| Mohd Nazmi Sharif | Optimist | 18 | 2nd place, silver medalist(s) |
| Kevin Lim | Laser | 18 | 2nd place, silver medalist(s) |

Open

| Athlete | Event | Final | |
| Athlete | Event | Net points | Rank |
|---|---|---|---|
| Malik Sulaiman | Super Moth | 17 | 2nd place, silver medalist(s) |

== Squash ==
Individual

| Athlete | Event | Round of 32 | Round of 16 | Quarterfinal | Semifinal | Final | |
| Athlete | Event | Opposition Score | Opposition Score | Opposition Score | Opposition Score | Opposition Score | Rank |
|---|---|---|---|---|---|---|---|
| Kenneth Low (3) | Men's singles | Bye | Koo Ryun-hoe (KOR); W 9–0, 9–1, 9–1 | Jackie Lee (HKG); W 9–1, 9–5, 9–1 | Zarak Jahan Khan (PAK); L 8–10, 7–9, 0–9 | Did not advance | 3rd place, bronze medalist(s) |
| Ong Beng Hee (5) | Men's singles | Bye | Saman Tillekeratne (SRI); W 9–6, 9–3, 9–5 | Amjad Khan (PAK); L 4–9, 6–9, 9–1, 8–10 | Did not advance | | |
| Kuan Choy Lin (3) | Women's singles | —N/a | Sohini Kumari (IND); W 9–4, 9–0, 9–0 | Della Lee (SIN); L 5–9, 6–9, 10–9, 8–10 | Did not advance | | |
| Nicol David (1) | Women's singles | —N/a | Bye | Masami Kofuji (JPN); W 9–3, 9–2, 9–0 | Mah Li Lian (SIN); W 9–5, 9–1, 9–7 | Gold medal match Rebecca Chiu (HKG); W 9–3, 9–1, 9–6 | 1st place, gold medalist(s) |

== Swimming ==
Men

| Athlete | Event | Qualification | | Final | |
| Athlete | Event | Time | Rank | Time | Rank |
|---|---|---|---|---|---|
| Alex Lim | 100 m backstroke | 57.65 | 3 Q | 55.53 | 1st place, gold medalist(s) |
| Alex Lim | 200 m backstroke | | Q | 2:00.94 NR | 2nd place, silver medalist(s) |
| Elvin Chia | 100 m breaststroke | 1:03.81 | 4 Q | 1:03.09 | 3rd place, bronze medalist(s) |

== Wushu ==
Men

| Athlete | Event | Final | |
| Athlete | Event | Result | Rank |
|---|---|---|---|
| Oh Poh Soon | Changquan | 27.78 | 2nd place, silver medalist(s) |
| Ho Ro Bin | Nanquan | 9.30 | 3rd place, bronze medalist(s) |
