= Squash at the 1998 Asian Games – Men's singles =

Men's singles at the 1998 Asian Games
- Venue: Ambassador City Jomtien Hotel
- Dates: 8–12 December 1998
- Competitors: 19 from 12 nations

Medalists
gold medal	Zarak Jahan Khan	Pakistan
silver medal	Amjad Khan	Pakistan
bronze medal	Abdul Faheem Khan	Hong Kong
bronze medal	Kenneth Low	Malaysia

The men's singles Squash event at the 1998 Asian Games was part of the squash programme, taking place from 8 to 12 December, at the Ambassador City Jomtien Hotel, Pattaya, Thailand.

== Schedule ==
All times are Indochina Time (UTC+07:00)

Date	Time	Event
Tuesday, 8 December 1998	10:00	1st round
Wednesday, 9 December 1998	10:00	2nd round
Thursday, 10 December 1998	10:00	Quarterfinals
Friday, 11 December 1998	10:00	Semifinals
Saturday, 12 December 1998	10:00	Final

== Results ==
=== Finals ===
Semifinals					Final
1	Amjad Khan (PAK)	9	9	9
4	Abdul Faheem Khan (HKG)	0	3	3	1	Amjad Khan (PAK)	9	0	9	7	3
3	Kenneth Low (MAS)	8	7	0	2	Zarak Jahan Khan (PAK)	1	9	6	9	9
2	Zarak Jahan Khan (PAK)	10	9	9

=== Top half ===
==== Section 1 ====
1st round	2nd round					Quarterfinals
	1	Amjad Khan (PAK)	9	9	9
		Lim Jit Uei (SIN)	3	3	5
						1	Amjad Khan (PAK)	9	9	1	10
						5	Ong Beng Hee (MAS)	4	6	9	8
	5	Ong Beng Hee (MAS)	9	9	9
		Saman Tillekeratne (SRI)	6	3	6

==== Section 2 ====
1st round
Saad Al-Hijazi (JOR)	9	9	9
Jamshad Pourtork (IRI)	4	0	5

2nd round
4	Abdul Faheem Khan (HKG)	9	9	9
Supich Ansvananda (THA)	0	0	0
8	Faisal Sarkhouh (KUW)	9	9	9
Saad Al-Hijazi (JOR)	0	3	1

Quarterfinals
4	Abdul Faheem Khan (HKG)	9	9	9
8	Faisal Sarkhouh (KUW)	3	0	6

=== Bottom half ===
==== Section 3 ====
1st round	2nd round					Quarterfinals
		Gihan Fernando (SRI)	0	3	0
	6	Jackie Lee (HKG)	9	9	9
						6	Jackie Lee (HKG)	1	5	1
						3	Kenneth Low (MAS)	9	9	9
		Koo Ryun-hoe (KOR)	0	1	1
	3	Kenneth Low (MAS)	9	9	9

==== Section 4 ====
1st round
Visuth Tepabutra (THA)	8	7	1
Khaled Al-Subaie (KUW)	10	9	9
Shahyar Dolatshahi (IRI)	0	2	3
Yoshihiro Watanabe (JPN)	9	9	9

2nd round
Khaled Al-Subaie (KUW)	1	9	2	7
7	Mohammad Al-Said (JOR)	9	7	9	9
Yoshihiro Watanabe (JPN)	1	1	0
2	Zarak Jahan Khan (PAK)	9	9	9

Quarterfinals
7	Mohammad Al-Said (JOR)	6	9	2	1
2	Zarak Jahan Khan (PAK)	9	5	9	9
