= Cue sports at the 1998 Asian Games – Men's snooker doubles =

Men's snooker doubles at the 1998 Asian Games
- Venue: Land Sports Complex
- Dates: 9–11 December 1998
- Competitors: 54 from 17 nations

Medalists
gold medal	Sam Chong; Ooi Chin Kay	Malaysia
silver medal	Phaitoon Phonbun; Noppadon Noppachorn	Thailand
bronze medal	Shokat Ali; Saleh Mohammad	Pakistan

The men's snooker singles tournament at the 1998 Asian Games in Thailand took place from 9 to 11 December 1998 at Land Sports Complex.

== Schedule ==
All times are Indochina Time (UTC+07:00)

Date	Time	Event
Wednesday, 9 December 1998	09:00	First round
Thursday, 10 December 1998	09:00	Third round
Thursday, 10 December 1998	16:00	Quarterfinals
Friday, 11 December 1998	09:00	Semifinals
Friday, 11 December 1998	16:00	Finals

== Results ==
Legend

- WO — Won by walkover

=== Finals ===
Final
Sam Chong (MAS); Ooi Chin Kay (MAS)	6
Phaitoon Phonbun (THA); Noppadon Noppachorn (THA)	4

3rd place match
Wattana Pu-ob-orm (THA); Chuchart Trirattanapradit (THA)	1
Shokat Ali (PAK); Saleh Mohammad (PAK)	5

=== Top half ===
First round
Pang Weiguo (CHN); Da Hailin (CHN)	4
Yasin Merchant (IND); Alok Kumar (IND)	5
Sultankhodja Marifkhodjaev (UZB); Rustam Usmanov (UZB)
Freddie Soh (SIN); Keith E (SIN)	WO
Chou Wen-hsien (TPE); Kuo Che-an (TPE)	3
Ahmad Al-Tarkait (KUW); Yaqoub Al-Anezi (KUW)	5
Farhan Mirza (PAK); Muhammad Yousaf (PAK)	5
Baldandorjiin Batsükh (MGL); Dashdorjiin Amarjargal (MGL)	0
Mok Sek Kei (MAC); Chou Nim Sam (MAC)	5
Mohammed Shehab (UAE); Mohammed Al-Jokar (UAE)	1
Abdullah Rahim Mohiddin (BRU); Kamarulzaman Pungut (BRU)	0
Marco Fu (HKG); Chan Wai Tat (HKG)	5

Second round
Wattana Pu-ob-orm (THA); Chuchart Trirattanapradit (THA)	5
Yasin Merchant (IND); Alok Kumar (IND)	3
Freddie Soh (SIN); Keith E (SIN)	2
Ahmad Al-Tarkait (KUW); Yaqoub Al-Anezi (KUW)	5
Farhan Mirza (PAK); Muhammad Yousaf (PAK)	4
Mok Sek Kei (MAC); Chou Nim Sam (MAC)	5
Marco Fu (HKG); Chan Wai Tat (HKG)	3
Sam Chong (MAS); Ooi Chin Kay (MAS)	5

Quarterfinals
Wattana Pu-ob-orm (THA); Chuchart Trirattanapradit (THA)	5
Ahmad Al-Tarkait (KUW); Yaqoub Al-Anezi (KUW)	1
Mok Sek Kei (MAC); Chou Nim Sam (MAC)	1
Sam Chong (MAS); Ooi Chin Kay (MAS)	5

Semifinals
Wattana Pu-ob-orm (THA); Chuchart Trirattanapradit (THA)	2
Sam Chong (MAS); Ooi Chin Kay (MAS)	5

=== Bottom half ===
First round
Hung Chung-ming (TPE); Hsia Hui-kai (TPE)	5
Syedul Majumder (BAN); Morazzal Hossain (BAN)	0
Devendra Joshi (IND); Ashok Shandilya (IND)	4
Chew Lean Teng (MAS); Yong Kien Foot (MAS)	5
Adrian Tan (SIN); Bernard Tey (SIN)	5
Shinya Egashira (JPN); Junsuke Inoue (JPN)	0
Waleed Al-Hatem (KUW); Ibrahim Al-Fawdari (KUW)	2
Guo Hua (CHN); Yang Jianyue (CHN)	5
Marlon Manalo (PHI); Benjamin Guevarra (PHI)	WO
Bahtiyor Umarov (UZB); Mikhail Kim (UZB)

Second round
Shokat Ali (PAK); Saleh Mohammad (PAK)	5
Hung Chung-ming (TPE); Hsia Hui-kai (TPE)	3
Chew Lean Teng (MAS); Yong Kien Foot (MAS)	0
Adrian Tan (SIN); Bernard Tey (SIN)	5
Jamsrangiin Enkhtör (MGL); Dashdorjiin Orgil (MGL)	0
Guo Hua (CHN); Yang Jianyue (CHN)	5
Marlon Manalo (PHI); Benjamin Guevarra (PHI)	0
Phaitoon Phonbun (THA); Noppadon Noppachorn (THA)	5

Quarterfinals
Shokat Ali (PAK); Saleh Mohammad (PAK)	5
Adrian Tan (SIN); Bernard Tey (SIN)	0
Guo Hua (CHN); Yang Jianyue (CHN)	1
Phaitoon Phonbun (THA); Noppadon Noppachorn (THA)	5

Semifinals
Shokat Ali (PAK); Saleh Mohammad (PAK)	1
Phaitoon Phonbun (THA); Noppadon Noppachorn (THA)	5
