= Cue sports at the 1998 Asian Games – Men's snooker singles =

Men's snooker singles at the 1998 Asian Games
- Venue: Land Sports Complex
- Dates: 6–8 December 1998
- Competitors: 36 from 19 nations

Medalists
gold medal	Shokat Ali	Pakistan
silver medal	Sam Chong	Malaysia
bronze medal	Chan Kwok Ming	Hong Kong

The men's snooker singles tournament at the 1998 Asian Games in Thailand took place from 6 to 8 December 1998 at Land Sports Complex.

== Schedule ==
All times are Indochina Time (UTC+07:00)

Date	Time	Event
Sunday, 6 December 1998	09:00	First round
Sunday, 6 December 1998	16:00	Second round
Monday, 7 December 1998	09:00	Third round
Monday, 7 December 1998	16:00	Quarterfinals
Tuesday, 8 December 1998	09:00	Semifinals
Tuesday, 8 December 1998	16:00	Finals

== Results ==
=== Finals ===
Semifinals
Chan Kwok Ming (HKG)	2
Sam Chong (MAS)	6
Ooi Chin Kay (MAS)	4
Shokat Ali (PAK)	6

Final
Sam Chong (MAS)	6
Shokat Ali (PAK)	7
3rd place match
Chan Kwok Ming (HKG)	5
Ooi Chin Kay (MAS)	0

=== Top half ===
==== Section 1 ====
First round
Chan Kwok Ming (HKG)	5
Benjamin Guevarra (PHI)	1

Second round
Shinya Egashira (JPN)	5
Vasiliy Lazarev (UZB)	2
Chan Kwok Ming (HKG)	5
Wattana Pu-ob-orm (THA)	1
Baldandorjiin Batsükh (MGL)	5
Shari Hj Emran (BRU)	4
Morazzal Hossain (BAN)	0
Mohammed Shehab (UAE)	5

Third round
Shinya Egashira (JPN)	0
Chan Kwok Ming (HKG)	5
Baldandorjiin Batsükh (MGL)	1
Mohammed Shehab (UAE)	5

Quarterfinals
Chan Kwok Ming (HKG)	5
Mohammed Shehab (UAE)	2

==== Section 2 ====
First round
Bernard Tey (SIN)	5
Susantha Boteju (SRI)	2

Second round
Hung Chung-ming (TPE)	5
Mok Sek Kei (MAC)	1
Bernard Tey (SIN)	4
Sam Chong (MAS)	5
Mohammed Al-Jokar (UAE)	5
Hiroshi Noro (JPN)	1
Waleed Al-Hatem (KUW)	5
Syed Mohammed Sajjad (BAN)	1

Third round
Hung Chung-ming (TPE)	2
Sam Chong (MAS)	5
Mohammed Al-Jokar (UAE)	5
Waleed Al-Hatem (KUW)	0

Quarterfinals
Sam Chong (MAS)	5
Mohammed Al-Jokar (UAE)	2

=== Bottom half ===
==== Section 3 ====
First round
Hsia Hui-kai (TPE)	5
Chou Nim Sam (MAC)	1

Second round
Yasin Merchant (IND)	5
Saleh Mohammad (PAK)	4
Pang Weiguo (CHN)	5
Ibrahim Al-Fawdari (KUW)	0
Jamsrangiin Enkhtör (MGL)	0
Ooi Chin Kay (MAS)	5
Hsia Hui-kai (TPE)	4
Marco Fu (HKG)	5

Third round
Yasin Merchant (IND)	5
Pang Weiguo (CHN)	1
Ooi Chin Kay (MAS)	5
Marco Fu (HKG)	3

Quarterfinals
Yasin Merchant (IND)	4
Ooi Chin Kay (MAS)	5

==== Section 4 ====
First round
Abdullah Rahim Mohiddin (BRU)	3
Marlon Manalo (PHI)	5

Second round
Keith E (SIN)	5
Phaitoon Phonbun (THA)	3
Sultankhodja Marifkhodjaev (UZB)	0
Guo Hua (CHN)	5
Alok Kumar (IND)	5
Lê Công Đức (VIE)	1
Marlon Manalo (PHI)	4
Shokat Ali (PAK)	5

Third round
Keith E (SIN)	5
Guo Hua (CHN)	4
Alok Kumar (IND)	3
Shokat Ali (PAK)	5

Quarterfinals
Keith E (SIN)	2
Shokat Ali (PAK)	5
