= Cue sports at the 1998 Asian Games – Men's snooker team =

Men's snooker team at the 1998 Asian Games
- Venue: Land Sports Complex
- Dates: 12–14 December 1998
- Nations: 11

The men's snooker team tournament at the 1998 Asian Games in Thailand took place from 12 to 14 December 1998 at Land Sports Complex.

== Results ==
First round
United Arab Emirates	1
India	2
China	3
Chinese Taipei	0
Brunei	0
Philippines	3
Singapore	3
Kuwait	0
Mongolia	0
Malaysia	3

Quarterfinals
Hong Kong	2
India	1
China	1
Pakistan	2
Thailand	3
Philippines	0
Singapore	1
Malaysia	2

Semifinals
Hong Kong	2
Pakistan	1
Thailand	2
Malaysia	1

Final
Hong Kong	2
Thailand	1
3rd place match
Pakistan	2
Malaysia	1

=== First round ===
Mongolia	0–3	Malaysia

Jamsrangiin Enkhtör	0–5	Sam Chong
Baldandorjiin Batsükh	0–5	Ooi Chin Kay
Dashdorjiin Amarjargal	0–5	Yong Kien Foot

=== Quarterfinals ===
Hong Kong	2–1	India

Marco Fu	5–1	Yasin Merchant
Chan Kwok Ming	5–1	Devendra Joshi
Chan Wai Tat	0–5	Alok Kumar

China	1–2	Pakistan

Da Hailin	5–2	Saleh Mohammad
Yang Jianyue	3–5	Farhan Mirza
Pang Weiguo	3–5	Shokat Ali

Singapore	1–2	Malaysia

Bernard Tey	1–5	Sam Chong
Adrian Tan	3–5	Ooi Chin Kay

=== Semifinals ===
Hong Kong	2–1	Pakistan

Marco Fu	5–4	Shokat Ali
Chan Wai Tat	5–1	Saleh Mohammad
Chan Kwok Ming	3–5	Farhan Mirza

Thailand	2–1	Malaysia

Phaitoon Phonbun	5–1	Ooi Chin Kay
Noppadon Noppachorn	5–1	Elvin Lean
Wattana Pu-ob-orm	2–5	Sam Chong

=== 3rd place match ===
Pakistan	2–1	Malaysia

Shokat Ali	5–1	Ooi Chin Kay
Farhan Mirza	5–3	Elvin Lean
Saleh Mohammad	2–5	Sam Chong

=== Final ===
Hong Kong	2–1	Thailand

Chan Kwok Ming	0–6	Chuchart Trirattanapradit
Marco Fu	6–5	Phaitoon Phonbun
Chan Wai Tat	6–5	Noppadon Noppachorn
