= Squash at the 1998 Asian Games – Women's singles =

Squash competition

Women's singles at the 1998 Asian Games
- Venue: Ambassador City Jomtien Hotel
- Dates: 9–12 December 1998
- Competitors: 14 from 8 nations

Medalists
gold medal	Nicol David	Malaysia
silver medal	Rebecca Chiu	Hong Kong
bronze medal	Mah Li Lian	Singapore
bronze medal	Della Lee	Singapore

The women's singles Squash event was part of the squash programme at the 1998 Asian Games. The event was held from 9 to 12 December, at the Ambassador City Jomtien Hotel, Pattaya, Thailand.

== Schedule ==
All times are Indochina Time (UTC+07:00)

Date	Time	Event
Wednesday, 9 December 1998	14:00	1st round
Thursday, 10 December 1998	08:00	Quarterfinals
Friday, 11 December 1998	14:00	Semifinals
Saturday, 12 December 1998	12:00	Final

== Results ==
=== Final ===
Final
1	Nicol David (MAS)	9	9	9
2	Rebecca Chiu (HKG)	3	1	6

=== Top half ===
1st round
7	Mekhala Subedar (IND)	3	9	9	7	8
Masami Kofuji (JPN)	9	1	5	9	10
4	Mah Li Lian (SIN)	9	9	9
Nucharee Wangchai (THA)	1	0	0
5	Christina Mak (HKG)	9	9	9
Najada Majed (JOR)	3	0	2

Quarterfinals
1	Nicol David (MAS)	9	9	9
Masami Kofuji (JPN)	3	2	0
4	Mah Li Lian (SIN)	9	9	9
5	Christina Mak (HKG)	0	2	6

Semifinals
1	Nicol David (MAS)	9	9	9
4	Mah Li Lian (SIN)	5	1	7

=== Bottom half ===
1st round
Park Eun-ok (KOR)	0	9	0	0
6	Della Lee (SIN)	9	6	9	9
Sohini Kumari (IND)	4	0	0
3	Kuan Choy Lin (MAS)	9	9	9
Sopahpen Grachangnetara (THA)	2	3	0
8	Yuko Kimura (JPN)	9	9	9

Quarterfinals
6	Della Lee (SIN)	9	9	9	10
3	Kuan Choy Lin (MAS)	5	6	10	8
8	Yuko Kimura (JPN)	0	1	3
2	Rebecca Chiu (HKG)	9	9	9

Semifinals
6	Della Lee (SIN)	0	1	3
2	Rebecca Chiu (HKG)	9	9	9
