= 1998 Asian Games medal table =

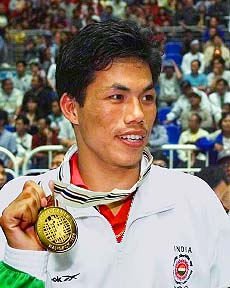
- Ngangom Dingko Singh of India shows his gold medal to photographers during the awarding ceremony for the 54kg class boxing final in the 13th Asian Games in Bangkok. Singh defeated Timur Tulyakov of Uzbekistan.
- Location: Bangkok, Thailand

Highlights
- Most gold medals: China 129
- Most total medals: China 274
- Medalling NOCs: 33

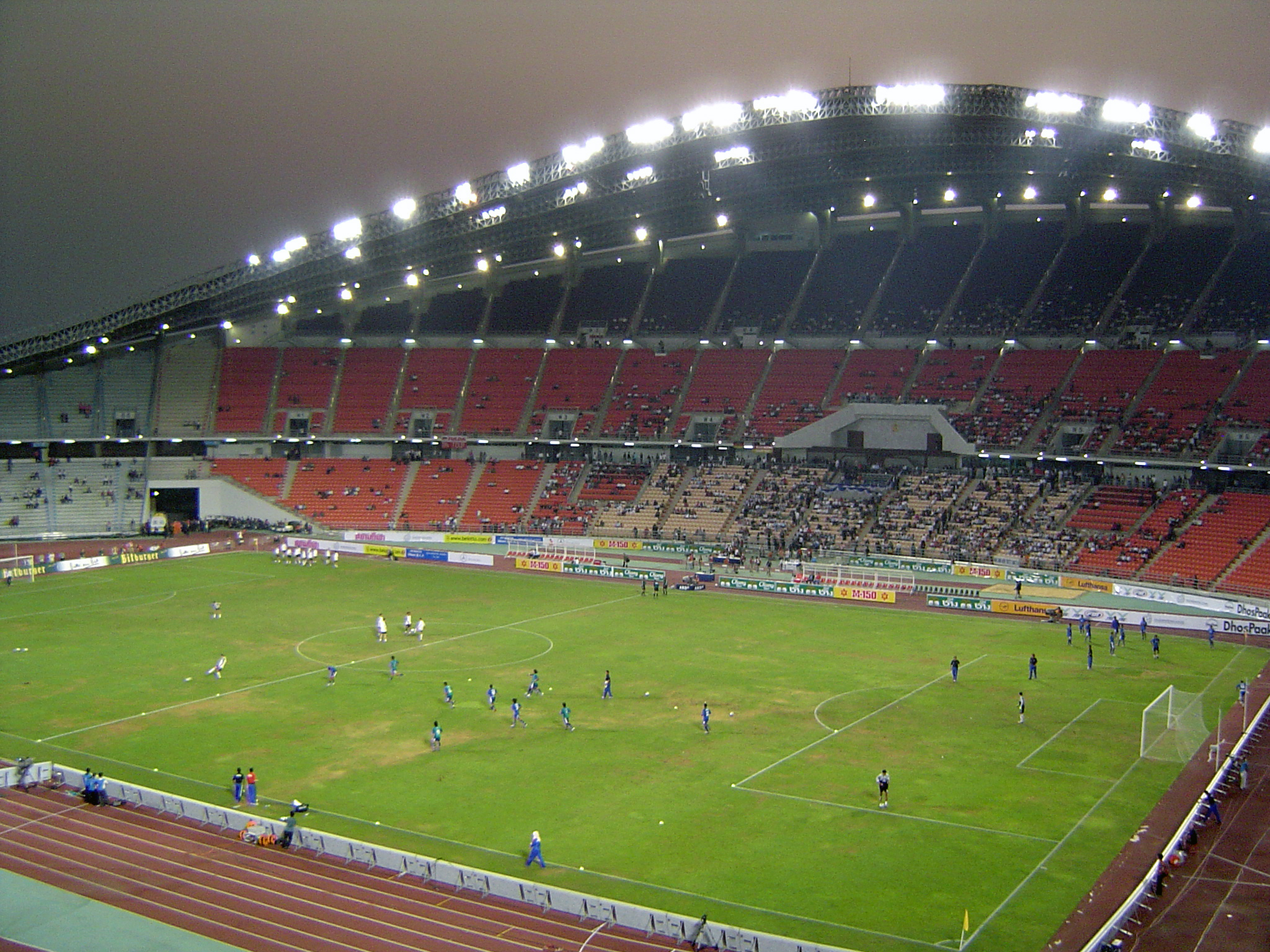
Rajamangala Stadium (used for many football matches) hosted the opening and closing ceremonies of the Games.

The 1998 Asian Games (officially known as the 13th Asian Games) was a multi-sport event held in Bangkok, Thailand from December 6 to December 20, 1998. A total of 6,544 athletes from 41 Asian National Olympic Committees (NOCs) participated in these games, competing in 376 events in 36 sports. This edition of the Games marked the addition of three sports—squash, rugby union and cue sports—to the list of Asian Games sports; squash was included after seven years of lobbying by the Asian Squash Federation.

Athletes from 33 NOCs won at least one medal, and athletes from 23 of these NOCs secured at least one gold; contingents from eight NOCs did not win any medals. China won the most gold medals (129) and the most medals overall (274), topping the medal table. South Korean athletes claimed 164 medals in total (including 65 gold), earning second spot on the table. Japan finished third with a total of 181 medals, including 52 gold. Host nation Thailand improved its medal-table rank compared with the last Asian Games held in Hiroshima, where it finished twelfth. In this Games Thailand ranked fourth in the medal table, with 24 gold and 90 medals overall.

== Medal table ==
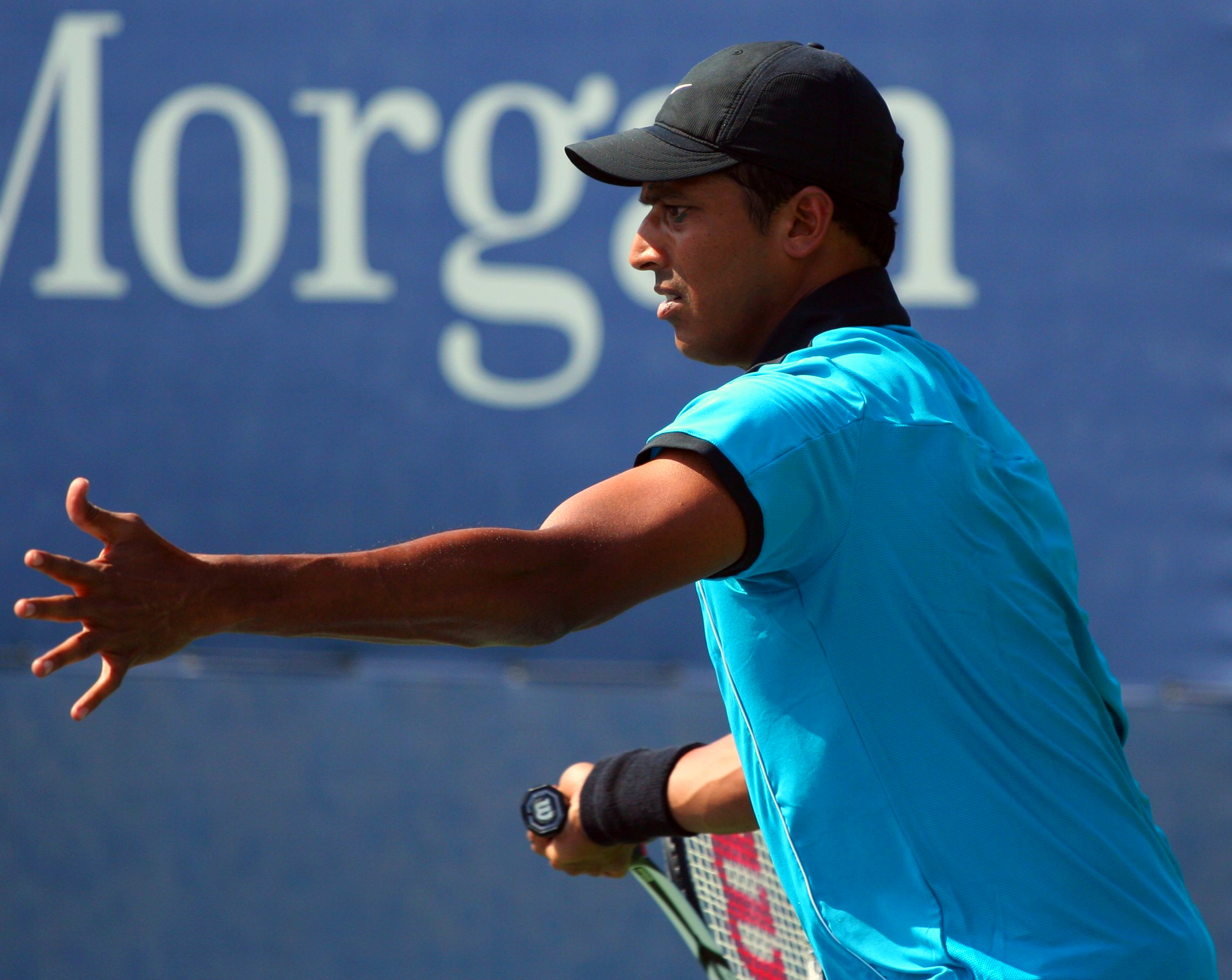
Mahesh Bhupathi of India won a bronze in men's singles, a bronze with Nirupama Vaidyanathan in mixed doubles and another bronze as a member of the Indian men's team.

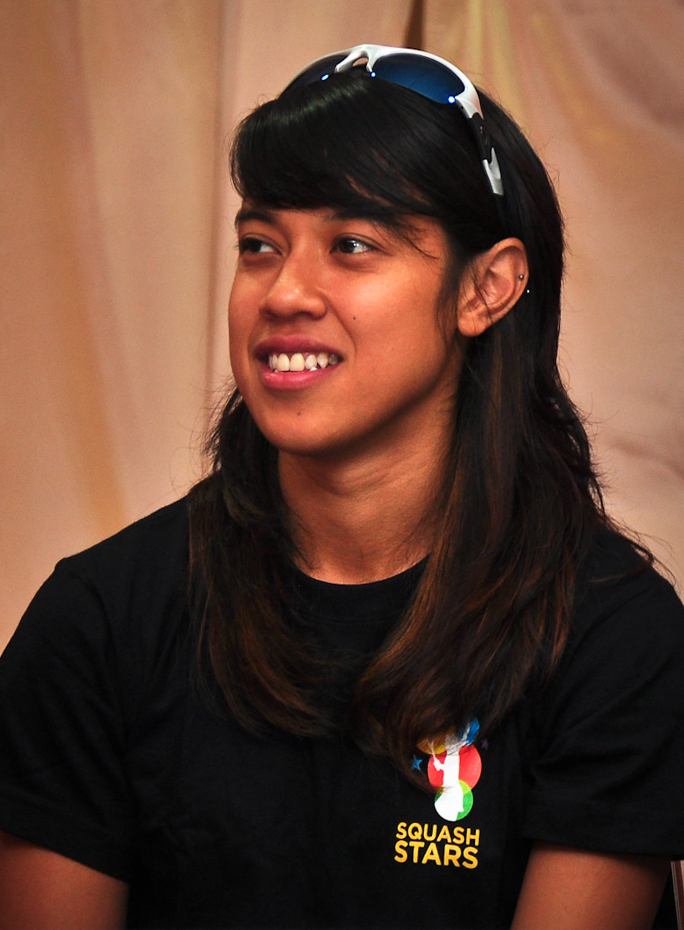
Nicol David of Malaysia won a gold medal in women's singles squash.

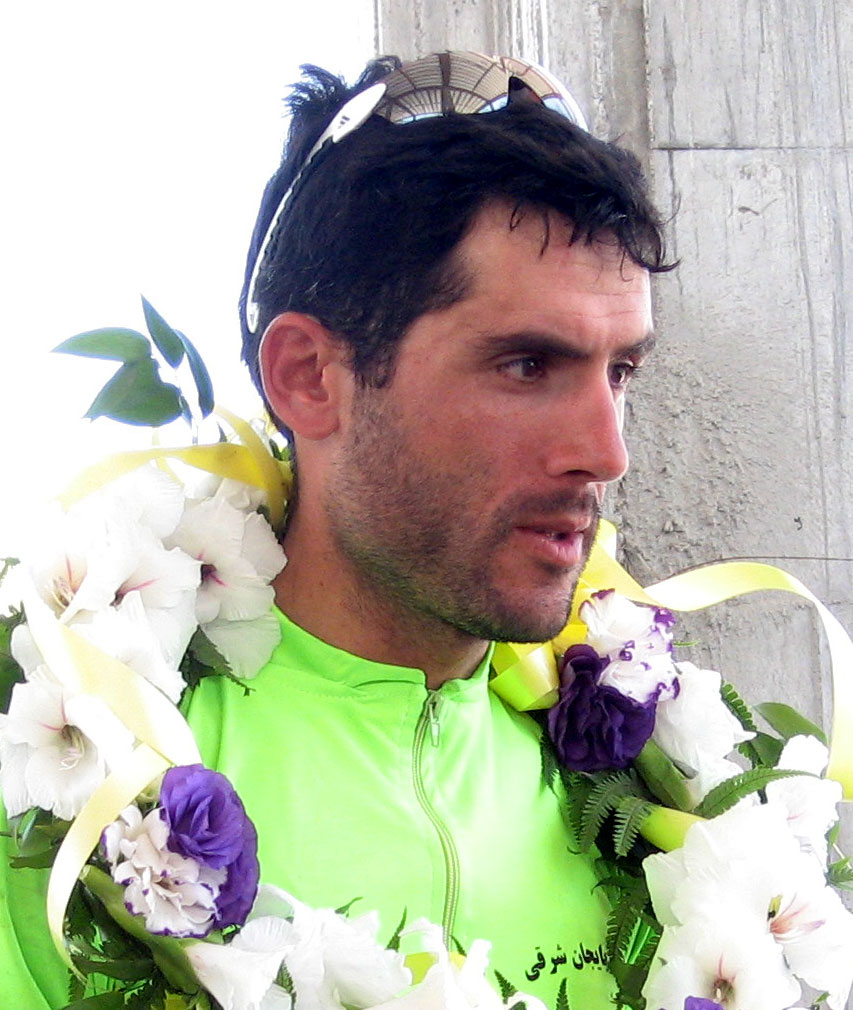
Ghader Mizbani of Iran won a gold in the men's road cycling individual time trial.

The ranking in this table is consistent with International Olympic Committee convention in its published medal tables. By default, the table is ordered by the number of gold medals the athletes from a nation have won (in this context, a nation is an entity represented by a National Olympic Committee). The number of silver medals is taken into consideration next, and then the number of bronze medals. If nations are still tied, equal ranking is given; they are listed alphabetically by IOC country code.

A total of 1,225 medals (378 gold, 380 silver and 467 bronze) were awarded. The total number of bronze medals is greater than the total number of gold or silver medals because two bronze medals were awarded per event in ten sports: badminton, boxing, judo, karate (except men's and women's individual kata), wushu (sanshou event only), sepak takraw (except men's and women's circle), squash, table tennis, taekwondo and tennis.

In swimming there was a three-way tie in the men's 100 m freestyle event, and three bronze medals were awarded; a tie for second place in the women's 100 m freestyle event meant that no bronze was awarded. In athletics, two bronze medals were awarded in the men's high jump event. In wushu, a tie for the silver-medal position in the men's changquan event (taolu discipline) resulted in no bronze being awarded; a three-way tie in the men's nanquan event (also taolu discipline) resulted in three bronze medals being awarded. In gymnastics, many shared medals were awarded. A tie for first place in the pommel horse resulted in two gold medals, and thus no silver was awarded; a tie for third place in the horizontal bar, pommel horse, rings, women's vault and women's floor exercises meant that two bronzes were awarded for each event. A four-way tie for second position in the parallel bars meant that no bronze medal was awarded.

* Host nation (Thailand)

Rank	Nation	Gold	Silver	Bronze	Total
1	China (CHN)	129	78	67	274
2	South Korea (KOR)	65	46	53	164
3	Japan (JPN)	52	61	68	181
4	Thailand (THA)*	24	26	40	90
5	Kazakhstan (KAZ)	24	24	30	78
6	Chinese Taipei (TPE)	19	17	41	77
7	Iran (IRI)	10	11	13	34
8	North Korea (PRK)	7	14	12	33
9	India (IND)	7	11	17	35
10	Uzbekistan (UZB)	6	22	12	40
11	Indonesia (INA)	6	10	11	27
12	Malaysia (MAS)	5	10	14	29
13	Hong Kong (HKG)	5	6	6	17
14	Kuwait (KUW)	4	6	4	14
15	Sri Lanka (SRI)	3	0	3	6
16	Pakistan (PAK)	2	4	9	15
17	Singapore (SIN)	2	3	9	14
18	Qatar (QAT)	2	3	3	8
19	Mongolia (MGL)	2	2	10	14
20	Myanmar (MYA)	1	6	4	11
21	Philippines (PHI)	1	5	12	18
22	Vietnam (VIE)	1	5	11	17
23	Turkmenistan (TKM)	1	0	1	2
24	Kyrgyzstan (KGZ)	0	3	3	6
25	Jordan (JOR)	0	3	2	5
26	Syria (SYR)	0	2	4	6
27	Nepal (NEP)	0	1	3	4
28	Macau (MAC)	0	1	0	1
29	Bangladesh (BAN)	0	0	1	1
29	Brunei (BRU)	0	0	1	1
29	Laos (LAO)	0	0	1	1
29	Oman (OMA)	0	0	1	1
29	United Arab Emirates (UAE)	0	0	1	1
Totals (33 entries)		378	380	467	1,225

== Changes in medal standings ==
Ruling date	Sport	Event	Nation	Gold	Silver	Bronze	Total
23 December 1998	Karate	Men's 75 kg	United Arab Emirates		–1		–1

After failing a drug test, Fakhruddin Abdulmajid Taher of the United Arab Emirates (UAE) was stripped of his silver medal in the men's kumite event (60 kg category) of karate. This disqualification left the UAE with only a single bronze medal, placing the country joint-last in the medal table with four other nations. The silver medal was not awarded to any other athlete.^{[a]}

== Notes ==
- ^{a} Initially the Olympic Council of Asia decided to give silver medals to Nepal and Syria, bronze medalists of the event. However, the decision was never carried out as both the nations were never promoted in the medal table.
