= Squash at the 1998 Asian Games =

- Venue: Ambassador City Jomtien Hotel
- Dates: 8–12 December 1998
- Competitors: 33 from 12 nations

Squash was contested from December 8 to December 12 at the 1998 Asian Games in Ambassador City Jomtien, Pattaya, Thailand. Competition consists of men's and women's singles competition.

Zarak Jahan Khan of Pakistan won the men's gold medal while Nicol David of Malaysia won the women's competition.

== Schedule ==
P	Preliminary rounds	¼	Quarterfinals	½	Semifinals	F	Final

Event↓/Date →	8th Tue	9th Wed	10th Thu	11th Fri	12th Sat
Men's singles	P	P	¼	½	F
Women's singles		P	¼	½	F

== Medalists ==
Event	Gold	Silver	Bronze
Men's singles	Zarak Jahan Khan; Pakistan	Amjad Khan; Pakistan	Abdul Faheem Khan; Hong Kong
Men's singles	Zarak Jahan Khan; Pakistan	Amjad Khan; Pakistan	Kenneth Low; Malaysia
Women's singles	Nicol David; Malaysia	Rebecca Chiu; Hong Kong	Mah Li Lian; Singapore
Women's singles	Nicol David; Malaysia	Rebecca Chiu; Hong Kong	Della Lee; Singapore

== Medal table ==
Rank	Nation	Gold	Silver	Bronze	Total
1	Pakistan (PAK)	1	1	0	2
2	Malaysia (MAS)	1	0	1	2
3	Hong Kong (HKG)	0	1	1	2
4	Singapore (SIN)	0	0	2	2
Totals (4 entries)		2	2	4	8

== Participating nations ==
A total of 33 athletes from 12 nations competed in squash at the 1998 Asian Games:

- Hong Kong (4)
- India (2)
- Iran (2)
- Japan (3)
- Jordan (3)
- Kuwait (2)
- Malaysia (4)
- Pakistan (2)
- Singapore (3)
- South Korea (2)
- Sri Lanka (2)
- Thailand (4)
