= Cycling at the 1998 Asian Games – Men's road race =

Men's road race at the 1998 Asian Games
- Venue: Phahonyothin Road
- Date: 19 December 1998
- Competitors: 47 from 17 nations

Medalists
gold medal	Wong Kam Po	Hong Kong
silver medal	Makoto Iijima	Japan
bronze medal	Victor Espiritu	Philippines

The men's 169.4 kilometres road race competition at the 1998 Asian Games was held on 19 December.

== Schedule ==
All times are Indochina Time (UTC+07:00)

Date	Time	Event
Saturday, 19 December 1998	12:00	Final

== Results ==
Legend

- DNF — Did not finish

Rank	Athlete	Time
1st place, gold medalist(s)	Wong Kam Po (HKG)	4:39:27
2nd place, silver medalist(s)	Makoto Iijima (JPN)	4:39:27
3rd place, bronze medalist(s)	Victor Espiritu (PHI)	4:39:27
4	Thongchai Wangardjaingam (THA)	4:41:06
5	Park Min-soo (KOR)	4:41:11
6	Warren Davadilla (PHI)	4:41:20
7	Sergey Derevyanov (KGZ)	4:41:20
8	Nor Effandy Rosli (MAS)	4:41:21
9	Ahad Kazemi (IRI)	4:41:21
10	Kazuyuki Manabe (JPN)	4:41:22
11	Jamsrangiin Ölzii-Orshikh (MGL)	4:41:26
12	Tomokazu Fujino (JPN)	4:42:25
13	Sergey Krushevskiy (UZB)	4:42:25
14	Dashnyamyn Tömör-Ochir (MGL)	4:42:25
15	Kim Bong-min (KOR)	4:42:26
16	Tang Xuezhong (CHN)	4:42:26
17	Majid Nasseri (IRI)	4:44:17
18	Mehran Esmaeili (IRI)	4:44:17
19	Sergey Belussov (KAZ)	4:44:17
20	Ali Sayed Darwish (UAE)	4:48:49
21	Dmitriy Fofonov (KAZ)	4:51:28
22	Alexandr Nadobenko (KAZ)	4:59:21
23	Li Fuyu (CHN)	4:59:32
24	Sergey Arkov (UZB)	4:59:32
25	Somboon Saetiew (THA)	4:59:32
26	Shahrulneeza Razali (MAS)	4:59:32
27	Humaid Al-Sabbagh (UAE)	4:59:32
28	Lloyd Reynante (PHI)	4:59:32
29	Mohd Mahazir Hamad (MAS)	4:59:32
30	Supart Thipbumroong (THA)	4:59:32
31	Khuyagtyn Pürevsüren (MGL)	4:59:32
32	Hamdani Hj Besar (BRU)	4:59:32
33	Ng Kwok Wah (HKG)	4:59:38
34	Sergey Yazov (KGZ)	4:59:39
35	Rafael Nuritdinov (UZB)	4:59:40
36	Pg Dato Hj Asmalee (BRU)	5:03:48
37	Ho Siu Lun (HKG)	5:03:49
38	Cheong Wai Chong (MAC)	5:03:52
39	Filipe Luis Alves (MAC)	5:03:52
40	Chan Lam Fai (MAC)	5:03:52
—	Hsieh Kuo-fang (TPE)	DNF
—	Mu Chih-hsin (TPE)	DNF
—	John Ong (SIN)	DNF
—	Chen Teng-tien (TPE)	DNF
—	Leonid Petrov (KGZ)	DNF
—	Ma Ye (CHN)	DNF
—	Lee Chieng Chien (BRU)	DNF
