= Cue sports at the 1998 Asian Games =

- Venue: Land Sports Complex
- Dates: 6–19 December 1998
- Competitors: 123 from 21 nations

Cue sports was contested at the Asian Games for the first time at the 1998 Asian Games in Bangkok, Thailand. The competition took place from 6 to 19 December at the Land Sports Complex. The competition included only men's events.

There were ten events at the competition, Carom billiards, English billiards, Pool and Snooker.

== Medalists ==
Event	Gold	Silver	Bronze
Three-cushion singles	Akio Shimada; Japan	Ryuji Umeda; Japan	Kim Jung-gyu; South Korea
English billiards singles	Ashok Shandilya; India	Geet Sethi; India	Praprut Chaithanasakun; Thailand
English billiards doubles	India; Geet Sethi; Ashok Shandilya	Thailand; Praprut Chaithanasakun; Mongkhon Kanfaklang	India; Devendra Joshi; Balachandra Bhaskar
Eight-ball singles	Chao Fong-pang; Chinese Taipei	Tan Tiong Boon; Singapore	Kunihiko Takahashi; Japan
Eight-ball doubles	Chinese Taipei; Lai Chia-hsiung; Chang Hao-ping	Chinese Taipei; Yang Ching-shun; Chao Fong-pang	Japan; Kunihiko Takahashi; Satoshi Kawabata
Nine-ball singles	Yang Ching-shun; Chinese Taipei	Kunihiko Takahashi; Japan	Chao Fong-pang; Chinese Taipei
Nine-ball doubles	Philippines; Gandy Valle; Romeo Villanueva	Chinese Taipei; Lai Chia-hsiung; Chang Hao-ping	Thailand; Anan Terananon; Worawit Suriyasriwan
Snooker singles	Shokat Ali; Pakistan	Sam Chong; Malaysia	Chan Kwok Ming; Hong Kong
Snooker doubles	Malaysia; Sam Chong; Ooi Chin Kay	Thailand; Phaitoon Phonbun; Noppadon Noppachorn	Pakistan; Shokat Ali; Saleh Mohammad
Snooker team	Hong Kong; Chan Kwok Ming; Chan Wai Tat; Marco Fu	Thailand; Wattana Pu-ob-orm; Phaitoon Phonbun; Chuchart Trirattanapradit; Noppadon Noppachorn	Pakistan; Shokat Ali; Farhan Mirza; Saleh Mohammad

== Medal table ==
Rank	Nation	Gold	Silver	Bronze	Total
1	Chinese Taipei (TPE)	3	2	1	6
2	India (IND)	2	1	1	4
3	Japan (JPN)	1	2	2	5
4	Malaysia (MAS)	1	1	0	2
5	Pakistan (PAK)	1	0	2	3
6	Hong Kong (HKG)	1	0	1	2
7	Philippines (PHI)	1	0	0	1
8	Thailand (THA)	0	3	2	5
9	Singapore (SIN)	0	1	0	1
10	South Korea (KOR)	0	0	1	1
Totals (10 entries)		10	10	10	30

== Participating nations ==
A total of 123 athletes from 21 nations competed in cue sports at the 1998 Asian Games:

- Bangladesh (3)
- Brunei (3)
- China (6)
- Chinese Taipei (12)
- Hong Kong (3)
- India (14)
- Japan (9)
- Kazakhstan (1)
- Kuwait (6)
- Macau (2)
- Malaysia (10)
- Mongolia (4)
- Pakistan (4)
- Philippines (8)
- Singapore (7)
- South Korea (2)
- Sri Lanka (3)
- Thailand (16)
- United Arab Emirates (3)
- Uzbekistan (5)
- Vietnam (2)
