= Handball at the 1998 Asian Games – Men's tournament =

Men at the 1998 Asian Games
- Venue: Thammasat Gymnasium 3
- Date: 7–16 December 1998
- Nations: 8

Medalists
gold medal	South Korea
silver medal	Kuwait
bronze medal	Japan

Men's handball at the 1998 Asian Games was held in Thammasat University, Bangkok from December 7 to December 16, 1998.

== Results ==
All times are Indochina Time (UTC+07:00)

=== Preliminary round ===
==== Group A ====
Pos	Team	Pld	W	D	L	GF	GA	GD	Pts	Qualification
1	Kuwait	3	2	1	0	104	54	+50	5 (Note: Head-to-head result: KUW 20–20 JPN. Overall goal difference was used as the tiebreaker.)	Semifinals
2	Japan	3	2	1	0	103	54	+49	5	Semifinals
3	United Arab Emirates	3	1	0	2	79	69	+10	2	Placement 5–6
4	Thailand	3	0	0	3	48	157	−109	0	Placement 7–8

Source: Results
Notes:

7 December; 15:00	Kuwait	21–20	United Arab Emirates	Thammasat Gymnasium 3, Bangkok
7 December; 15:00		(9–11)		Thammasat Gymnasium 3, Bangkok

7 December; 17:00	Thailand	15–54	Japan	Thammasat Gymnasium 3, Bangkok
7 December; 17:00		(9–26)		Thammasat Gymnasium 3, Bangkok

9 December; 15:00	Japan	20–20	Kuwait	Thammasat Gymnasium 3, Bangkok
9 December; 15:00		(9–10)		Thammasat Gymnasium 3, Bangkok

9 December; 17:00	United Arab Emirates	40–19	Thailand	Thammasat Gymnasium 3, Bangkok
9 December; 17:00		(22–11)		Thammasat Gymnasium 3, Bangkok

11 December; 15:00	United Arab Emirates	19–29	Japan	Thammasat Gymnasium 3, Bangkok
11 December; 15:00		(8–11)		Thammasat Gymnasium 3, Bangkok

11 December; 17:00	Kuwait	63–14	Thailand	Thammasat Gymnasium 3, Bangkok
11 December; 17:00		(29–6)		Thammasat Gymnasium 3, Bangkok

==== Group B ====
Pos	Team	Pld	W	D	L	GF	GA	GD	Pts	Qualification
1	South Korea	3	3	0	0	105	74	+31	6	Semifinals
2	Iran	3	2	0	1	77	86	−9	4	Semifinals
3	China	3	1	0	2	78	83	−5	2	Placement 5–6
4	Qatar	3	0	0	3	75	92	−17	0	Placement 7–8

Source: Results

8 December; 15:00	South Korea	32–25	China	Thammasat Gymnasium 3, Bangkok
8 December; 15:00		(17–10)		Thammasat Gymnasium 3, Bangkok

8 December; 17:00	Qatar	25–27	Iran	Thammasat Gymnasium 3, Bangkok
8 December; 17:00		(10–13)		Thammasat Gymnasium 3, Bangkok

10 December; 15:00	Iran	26–40	South Korea	Thammasat Gymnasium 3, Bangkok
10 December; 15:00		(9–21)		Thammasat Gymnasium 3, Bangkok

10 December; 17:00	China	32–27	Qatar	Thammasat Gymnasium 3, Bangkok
10 December; 17:00		(12–13)		Thammasat Gymnasium 3, Bangkok

12 December; 15:00	China	21–24	Iran	Thammasat Gymnasium 3, Bangkok
12 December; 15:00		(15–12)		Thammasat Gymnasium 3, Bangkok

12 December; 17:00	South Korea	33–23	Qatar	Thammasat Gymnasium 3, Bangkok
12 December; 17:00		(20–9)		Thammasat Gymnasium 3, Bangkok

=== Classification 5th–8th ===
==== Placement 7–8 ====
13 December; 15:00	Thailand	15–37	Qatar	Thammasat Gymnasium 3, Bangkok
13 December; 15:00		(6–22)		Thammasat Gymnasium 3, Bangkok

==== Placement 5–6 ====
13 December; 17:00	United Arab Emirates	29–23	China	Thammasat Gymnasium 3, Bangkok
13 December; 17:00		(13–13)		Thammasat Gymnasium 3, Bangkok

=== Final round ===
Semifinals
14 December
Kuwait	32
Iran	26
14 December
South Korea	35
Japan	27

Gold medal match
16 December
Kuwait	18
South Korea	29
Bronze medal match
16 December
Iran	23
Japan	28

==== Semifinals ====
14 December; 15:00	Kuwait	32–26	Iran	Thammasat Gymnasium 3, Bangkok
14 December; 15:00		(15–11)		Thammasat Gymnasium 3, Bangkok

14 December; 17:00	South Korea	35–27	Japan	Thammasat Gymnasium 3, Bangkok
14 December; 17:00		(18–11)		Thammasat Gymnasium 3, Bangkok

==== Bronze medal match ====
16 December; 15:00	Iran	23–28	Japan	Thammasat Gymnasium 3, Bangkok
16 December; 15:00		(12–16)		Thammasat Gymnasium 3, Bangkok

==== Gold medal match ====
16 December; 17:00	Kuwait	18–29	South Korea	Thammasat Gymnasium 3, Bangkok
16 December; 17:00		(12–15)		Thammasat Gymnasium 3, Bangkok

== Final standing ==
Rank	Team	Pld	W	D	L
1st place, gold medalist(s)	South Korea	5	5	0	0
2nd place, silver medalist(s)	Kuwait	5	3	1	1
3rd place, bronze medalist(s)	Japan	5	3	1	1
4	Iran	5	2	0	3
5	United Arab Emirates	4	2	0	2
6	China	4	1	0	3
7	Qatar	4	1	0	3
8	Thailand	4	0	0	4
