= Pakistan International =

Details
- Event name: Pakistan International Squash Championship
- Location: Islamabad Pakistan

Men's Winner
- Category: Challenger 10 (2020)
- Prize money: $12,000
- Most recent champion(s): (Pakistan) Tayyab Aslam (2020)

The Pakistan International is a squash tournament that takes place in Islamabad.

== Past Results ==
=== Men's ===
Year	Champion	Runner-up	Score in final
2020	(Pakistan) Tayyab Aslam	(Pakistan) Nasir Iqbal	11–7, 6–11, 3–11, 12–10, 13–11
2019 (Dec.)	(Pakistan) Tayyab Aslam	(Pakistan) Farhan Mehboob	11–8, 13–11, 11–4
2019 (Apr.)	(Egypt) Mohamed ElSherbini	(Pakistan) Farhan Mehboob	11–5, 5–11, 8–11, 11–7, 11–8
2015	No competition		
2014	No competition		
2013	No competition		
2012	No competition		
2011	No competition		
2010	No competition		
2009	No competition		
2008	(Pakistan) Aamir Atlas Khan	(Pakistan) Farhan Mehboob	11–8, 7–11, 5–11, 5–11
2007	No competition		
2006	(France) Thierry Lincou	(France) Grégory Gaultier	11–8, 6–11, 11–5, 11–5
2005	(France) Thierry Lincou	(Australia) David Palmer	11–9, 8–11, 11–1, 4–11, 11–7
2004	(England) James Willstrop	(Australia) Anthony Ricketts	6–11, 11–9, 13–11, 11–3
2003	No competition		
2002	(Canada) Jonathon Power	(England) Peter Nicol	15–10, 13–15, 15–10, 15–14
2001	No competition		
2000	No competition		
1999	(England) Peter Marshall	(Pakistan) Amjad Khan	8–15, 15–13, 15–12, 15–10
1998	(Pakistan) Amjad Khan	(Canada) Graham Ryding	15–8, 11–15, 15–9, 13–15, 15–9
1997	(Pakistan) Jansher Khan	(Australia) Anthony Hill	15–11, 15–7, 15–8
1996	No competition		
1995	(Pakistan) Jansher Khan	(Australia) Rodney Eyles	15–9, 15–12, 15–8
1994	(Pakistan) Jansher Khan	(England) Peter Marshall	14–15, 15–14, 15–10, 9–15, 15–6
1993	No competition		
1992	(Pakistan) Jansher Khan	(Pakistan) Jahangir Khan	15–13, 15–5, 15–12
1991	(Pakistan) Jahangir Khan	(Pakistan) Jansher Khan	9–15, 15–10, 15–10, 15–5
1990	(Pakistan) Jansher Khan	(Pakistan) Jahangir Khan	9–2, 4–9, 9–2, 9–2
1989	(Pakistan) Jahangir Khan	(Pakistan) Jansher Khan	15–11, 15–12, 15–10
1988	(Pakistan) Jahangir Khan	(Pakistan) Jansher Khan	16–17, 10–15, 15–9, 15–9, 15–7
1987	(Pakistan) Jansher Khan	(Pakistan) Jahangir Khan	1–9, 9–1, 10–8, 9–5, 9–0
1986	(Pakistan) Jahangir Khan	(Australia) Ross Thorne	9–2, 9–0, 9–2
1985	(Pakistan) Jahangir Khan	(Pakistan) Qamar Zaman	
1984	(Pakistan) Jahangir Khan	(Australia) Chris Dittmar	
1983	(Pakistan) Jahangir Khan	(Pakistan) Qamar Zaman	
1982	(Pakistan) Jahangir Khan	(England) Hiddy Jahan	
1981	(Pakistan) Jahangir Khan	(Pakistan) Qamar Zaman	
1980	(Pakistan) Jahangir Khan	(Pakistan) Qamar Zaman	
