= 2007 UCI Track Cycling World Championships – Men's scratch =

Men's scratch at the 2007 UCI Track Cycling World Championships
- Venue: Palma Arena
- Location: Palma de Mallorca, Spain
- Date: 30 March 2007
- Competitors: 27 from 27 nations

Medalists
| gold medal | Kam-Po Wong | Hong Kong |
| silver medal | Wim Stroetinga | Netherlands |
| bronze medal | Rafał Ratajczyk | Poland |

The Men's Scratch was one of the 10 men's events contested at the 2007 UCI Track World Championship, held in Palma de Mallorca, Spain.

27 Cyclists from 27 countries participated in the scratch race. After the 2 qualifying heats, the best 11 of each heat advanced to the Final.

The qualifying heats began at 15:10 and the Final was run at 21:05 on March 30.

== Qualification ==
The qualifying competition consisted of 30 laps, making a total of 7.5 km.

=== Heat 1 ===
| Rank | Name | Country | Q |
|---|---|---|---|
| 1 | Vasil Kiryienka | Belarus | Q |
| 2 | Kazuhiro Mori | Japan | Q |
| 3 | Martin Bláha | Czech Republic | Q |
| 4 | Jonathan Bellis | United Kingdom | Q |
| 5 | Danilo Napolitano | Italy | Q |
| 6 | Ioannis Tamouridis | Greece | Q |
| 7 | Henning Bommel | Germany | Q |
| 8 | Jérôme Beuville | France | Q |
| 9 | Andris José Hernandez | Venezuela | Q |
| 10 | Ivan Kovalev | Russia | Q |
| 11 | Mitchell Docker | Australia | Q |
| 12 | Ignatas Konovalovas | Lithuania | |
| 13 | Mahammad Alakbarov | Azerbaijan | |
| 14 | Michael Færk Christensen | Denmark | |

=== Heat 2 ===
| Rank | Name | Country | Q |
|---|---|---|---|
| 1 | Kam-Po Wong | Hong Kong | Q |
| 2 | Charles Bradley Huff | United States | Q |
| 3 | Vladimir Tuychiev | Uzbekistan | Q |
| 4 | Rafał Ratajczyk | Poland | Q |
| 5 | Greg Henderson | New Zealand | Q |
| 6 | Unai Elorriaga Zubiaur | Spain | Q |
| 7 | Wim Stroetinga | Netherlands | Q |
| 8 | Franco Marvulli | Switzerland | Q |
| 9 | Steve Schets | Belgium | Q |
| 10 | Roland Garber | Austria | Q |
| 11 | Angel Dario Colla | Argentina | Q |
| 12 | Volodymyry Rybin | Ukraine | |
| 13 | Juha-Matti Alaluusua | Finland | |

== Final ==
The Final competition consisted of 60 laps, making a total of 15 km. The champion Kam-Po Wong overtook the lead pack when there were 9 laps remaining and he crossed the finishing line at roughly 17 minutes 43 seconds.

| Rank | Name | Country |
|---|---|---|
| | Kam-Po Wong | Hong Kong |
| | Wim Stroetinga | Netherlands |
| | Rafał Ratajczyk | Poland |
| 4 | Martin Bláha | Czech Republic |
| 5 | Ivan Kovalev | Russia |
| 6 | Unai Elorriaga Zubiaur | Spain |
| 7 | Steve Schets | Belgium |
| 8 | Ioannis Tamouridis | Greece |
| 9 | Vasil Kiryienka | Belarus |
| 10 | Roland Garber | Austria |
| 11 | Danilo Napolitano | Italy |
| 12 | Mitchell Docker | Australia |
| 13 | Charles Bradley Huff | United States |
| 14 | Jonathan Bellis | United Kingdom |
| 15 | Vladimir Tuychiev | Uzbekistan |
| DNF | Angel Dario Colla | Argentina |
| DNF | Jérôme Neuville | France |
| DNF | Henning Bommel | Germany |
| DNF | Kazuhiro Mori | Japan |
| DNF | Greg Henderson | New Zealand |
| DNF | Franco Marvulli | Switzerland |
| DNF | Andris José Hernandez | Venezuela |
