= Equestrian at the 1998 Asian Games – Individual eventing =

Individual eventing at the 1998 Asian Games
- Venue: Fort Adison Riding Club
- Date: 6–8 December 1998
- Competitors: 21 from 5 nations

Medalists
gold medal	Ikko Murakami	Japan
silver medal	Nagone Kamolsiri	Thailand
bronze medal	Kiatnarong Klongkarn	Thailand

Individual eventing equestrian at the 1998 Asian Games was held in Fort Adison Riding Club, Saraburi, Thailand, from December 8 to 10, 1998.

== Schedule ==
All times are Indochina Time (UTC+07:00)

Date	Time	Event
Tuesday, 8 December 1998	07:00	Dressage
Wednesday, 9 December 1998	08:00	Cross-country
Thursday, 10 December 1998	15:00	Jumping

== Results ==
Legend

- EL — Eliminated
- RT — Retired
- WD — Withdrawn

Rank	Athlete	Horse	Penalties			Total
Rank	Athlete	Horse	Dressage	X-country	Jumping	Total
1st place, gold medalist(s)	Ikko Murakami (JPN)	Onward Caesar	53.40	0.00	0.00	53.40
2nd place, silver medalist(s)	Nagone Kamolsiri (THA)	Chor Chuthima	54.60	0.00	0.00	54.60
3rd place, bronze medalist(s)	Kiatnarong Klongkarn (THA)	Stylish Amb.	62.40	0.00	5.00	67.40
4	Fuangvich Aniruth-deva (THA)	Venetian Waltz	58.20	0.00	10.00	68.20
5	Vithai Laithomya (THA)	Montana	58.60	0.00	10.00	68.60
6	Sachiko Kodera (JPN)	Stars de Riols	69.40	0.00	0.00	69.40
7	Park Jae-hong (KOR)	Buddy Good	64.80	0.00	5.00	69.80
8	Keizo Eto (JPN)	Gipsy Joe	72.00	0.00	5.00	77.00
9	Tunku Nazroff (MAS)	Sprite	80.40	0.00	5.00	85.40
10	Amlokjit Singh (IND)	Smart	76.40	0.00	25.00	101.40
11	Imtiaz Anees (IND)	Mirza	82.40	0.00	20.00	102.40
12	Mana Sonkratok (THA)	Jarungsap	100.80	2.75	12.75	116.30
13	Husref Malek (MAS)	McPherson	124.80	0.00	10.00	134.80
14	Kim Hyung-chil (KOR)	Hello Henry	366.00	0.00	0.00	366.00
—	Ashraff Denal Ali (MAS)	Deutsche Mark	81.80	WD		WD
—	James Ravindra (MAS)	Alf	62.60	EL		EL
—	Choi Myung-jin (KOR)	Cool Spirit	79.40	EL		EL
—	Shigeyuki Hosono (JPN)	As du Perche	51.80	WD		WD
—	Palwinder Singh (IND)	Nector	76.40	EL		EL
—	Rajesh Pattu (IND)	Ringo	88.20	RT		RT
—	Yang Hi-won (KOR)	It's Hollywood	73.20	EL		EL
