= Wong Kam-po =

Hong Kong cyclist (born 1973)

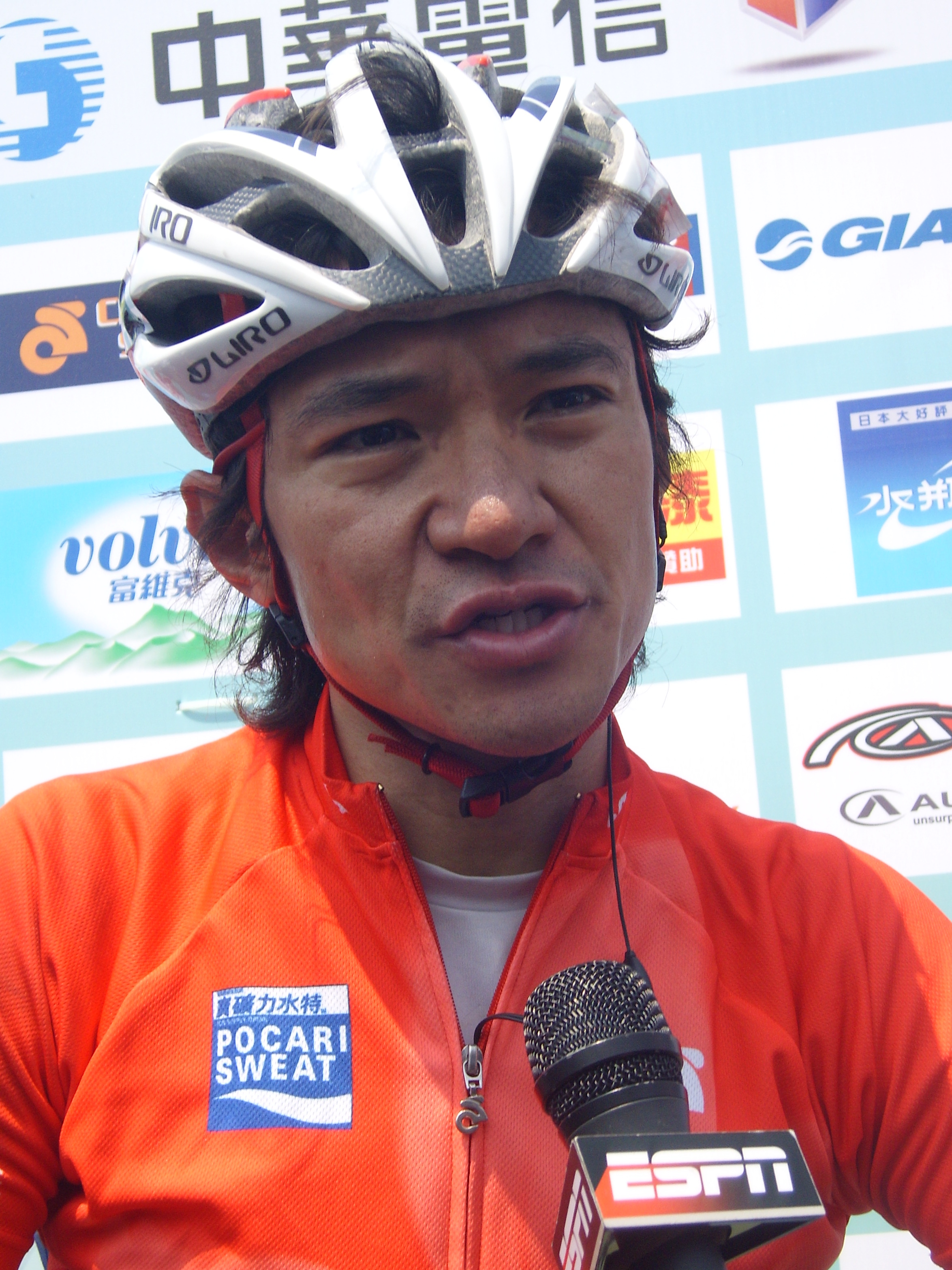

Personal information
- Full name: Wong Kam-po
- Born: 13 March 1973 (age 53) British Hong Kong
- Height: 1.73 m (5 ft 8 in)

Cycling career
- Sport: Cycling
- Disciplines: Track, road
- Role: Coach

Professional teams
- 2000-2003: Telekom Malaysia
- 2003-2004: Marco Polo Cycling Team
- 2005-2006: Purapharm
- 2006: Tarbes Pyrénées Cyclisme
- 2007: Hong Kong Pro Cycling Team

Major wins
- World 15 km Scratch race champion (2007)
Medal record
Representing Hong Kong
Men's track cycling
World Championships
Gold medal – first place	2007 Palma de Mallorca	Men's Scratch 15 km
Asian Games
Bronze medal – third place	2002 Busan	Madison
Silver medal – second place	2010 Guangzhou	Points race
Men's road bicycle racing
Asian Games
Gold medal – first place	1998 Bangkok	Individual Road Race
Gold medal – first place	2006 Doha	Individual Road Race
Gold medal – first place	2010 Guangzhou	Individual Road Race
Bronze medal – third place	2002 Busan	Individual Road Race

Wong Kam-po
- Traditional Chinese: 黃金寶
- Simplified Chinese: 黄金宝
Transcriptions
Standard Mandarin
- Hanyu Pinyin: Huáng Jīnbǎo
Yue: Cantonese
- Jyutping: wong^{4} gam^{1} bou^{2}

Wong Kam-po SBS MH (Chinese: 黃金寶; Jyutping: wong^{4} gam^{1} bou^{2}, born 13 March 1973) is a Hong Kong racing cyclist. A specialist in road bicycle racing, at age 34 he became a track cycling world champion in the scratch race of the 2007 World Championships, which was not his specialty.

Wong Kam-po is a five-time Olympian (the most of any Hong Kong athlete) and much-lauded sports icon. He won Asian Games individual road race three times (1998, 2006, 2010) under competition from Pro tour cyclists of Central Asia countries such as Kazakhstan and won the track World Cup twice. After his professional career, he became a couch for the Hong Kong national team before later joining the Sports Federation and Olympic Committee of Hong Kong.

== Biography ==
=== Early career and Asian Games gold medalist ===
Wong Kam-po joined the Hong Kong cycling team in 1990. He quit the team after allegedly fighting with a teammate. After meeting his current coach Shen Jiang-Kong (Chinese: 沈金康), he rejoined the team and began a successful career, winning golds in the National Games of China (1997 and 2001) and the Asian Games (1998, 2006, 2010). In 1997, he won the Tour de Filipinas cycling race.

In 1992, he was banned from international races for one year for deserting the trouble-plagued 1992 pre-Olympic training squad in France, in support of his coach Chow Tat-ming who was in dispute with the Hong Kong Cycling Association over wages. Wong returned to racing in the opening race of the 1993-94 season. He won his third Asian Games Gold Medal in Guangzhou.

=== 2007 World Champion in scratch race ===
A specialist in road bicycle racing, at age 34 he became a track cycling world champion in the scratch race of the 2007 World Championships, which is not his specialty. In the race, he overtook the lead pack with nine laps remaining and crossed the finishing line at 17 minutes 45 seconds. He earned the right to wear the Rainbow Jersey for the year 2007-08.

=== 2008 and 2012 Olympics ===
Wong performed well at the 2007 UCI B World Championships road race, with a 4th-place finish. He qualified for the track cycling points race of the 2008 Beijing Olympics and finished at the 15th out of 23 cyclists. He is the flag bearer for Hong Kong.

At the 2012 London Olympics, Wong Kam-Po was the sole Hong Kong rider to attend Men's road race. He finished 37th, just 40 seconds behind winner Alexander Vinokurov.

=== As a sports icon ===
Wong Kam-Po performed consistently throughout his career in international competition, and got "Best of the Best" title of Hong Kong Sports Stars Award in 2006, 2007 and 2010.

In 2007 he became the first HongKonger World Champion cyclist and thereby became the sports icon of Hong Kong.

On 29 June 2007, Hu Jintao, then-General Secretary of the Chinese Communist Party, visited Hong Kong and met Wong. Hu commented, "you brought glory for Hong Kong and for your country. You are a darling more precious than gold." (Chinese: 你為香港、為國家爭得了榮譽，你是比黃金還珍貴的寶貝) Hu's remarks became a viral wordplay on Wong Kam-po's name, as Po means darling and Wong Kam means gold.

After Wong Kam-Po won his third Asian Games Gold Medal in Guangzhou, Hong Kong's Secretary for Home Affairs Tsang Tak-sing said, "I would like to pay my particular tribute to our cyclist Wong Kam-po who has won three gold, one silver and one bronze, including the gold medal grabbed today, during his various performances at the Asian Games. He epitomises Hong Kong people's determination and perseverance. This is legendary."

Wong was the first Hong Kong rider to gain Category One status in Europe.

=== After professional cyclist career ===
Wong Kam-Po became a coach of Hong Kong National cycling team after retirement in 2013.

In 2017, Wong left coach position and joined Sports Federation and Olympic Committee of Hong Kong.

From 2022, Wong is chairman of Athletes Committee of SPORTS FEDERATION & OLYMPIC COMMITTEE OF HONG KONG, CHINA. In the 2022 Hangzhou Asian Games, Wong once again represented Hong Kong as the torch bearer.

=== Brand Spokesman and TV advertisement ===
Wong Kam-Po was spokesman of Giant Bicycles, KMC Chain, Polar cycling computer covering Greater China Regions.

He is also Hong Kong region spokesman of Nike, Uniqlo, Panasonic etc.

Po is the protagonist of commercial TV advertisements including:

2007 : Hong Kong School of Motoring - Safety drive.

2011 : Beauty Choice - Skeleton Plus.

2011 : Dah Sing Life Insurance - Hong Kong Spirit.

2015 : Dah Sing Life Insurance - Wong Kam Po vs Shark.

2022 : Panasonic - Golden Rice Cooker.

== 2023 Asian Games bid ==
Wong Kam-po is a supporter of Hong Kong's 2023 Asian Games bid. On 29 November 2010, speaking at the Legislative Council Home Affairs Panel special meeting on the proposed hosting of the 2023 Asian Games, Wong Kam-po said political parties' resistance to the proposal broke his heart. He said Hong Kong needs the spirit of sport, urging legislators to view the issue from a long-term and global perspective.

== Palmarès ==
1995
1st Tour de Okinawa
1st Pacific Ocean Games
1997
1st General Classification Tour of the Philippines
1998
1st Tour de Okinawa
1999
1st General Classification Tour of South China Sea
2000
1st Stage 4 Tour de Langkawi
1st Tour de Okinawa
1st in Stage 3 Tour of South China Sea
2001
1st Meridian Circuit, Englewood, Colorado (USA)
1st Stage 10 Superweek International Cycling Classic (USA)
1st Road Race, Asian Championships
1st General Classification Tour of South China Sea

1st Stage 2
1st Stage 3
1st Stage 4

Tour de Langkawi

1st Asian Rider Classification

2002
3rd Road Race, Asian Championships
3rd Road Race, Asian Games
1st Stage 5 Tour of Wellington
1st Stage 7 Tour of Wellington
3rd Langnau (SUI)
1st Stage 4 Tour of Qinghai Lake
2003
1st Steinfurt (GER)
1st Stage 3 Tour Nord-Isère (FRA)
1st Stage 1 Tour de Korea
1st Stage 5 Tour de Korea
1st Gippingen (SUI)
1st Stage 1 Tour of Qinghai Lake
2nd General Classification Tour of South China Sea

1st Stage 2

2004
2nd Points Race, Asian Championships
3rd Scratch Race, Asian Championships
1st General Classification Tour de Hokkaido

1st Stage 1

1st Stage 5 Tour d'Indonesia, Madiun (IDN)
1st Tour de Okinawa (JPN)
3rd General Classification Tour of South China Sea
2005
1st Stage 7 Tour of South China Sea
1st Stage 1 Tour of Siam
1st in Stage 2 Tour of China, Hefei (CHN)
1st in Stage 3 Tour of China, Hefei (CHN)
1st in Stage 4 Tour of China, Hefei (CHN)
1st in Stage 9 Tour d'Indonesia, DenPasar (IDN)
2nd in General Classification Tour of South China Sea (HKG)

1st in Stage 2
1st in Stage 4
1st in Stage 5
1st in Stage 6

2006
1st GP des fêtes du Coux et Bigaroque (FRA)
1st Stage 3 Cepa Tour, Hong Kong, Asia World-Expo (HKG)
1st Stage 4 Cepa Tour, Hong Kong Shatin (HKG)
1st Stage 1 Tour of Japan, Osaka (JPN)
1st Road Race, Asian Games
1st Stage 4 Tour of South China Sea
2007
1st Stage 5 Jelajah Malaysia, Taiping (MAS)
1st Stage 2 Tour de Taiwan, Tainan (TPE)
1st Scratch Race, World Championships
2nd Hong Kong National Road Race Championships
2008
1st Scratch Race, Track World Cup, Los Angeles (USA)
1st in Stage 1 Tour de Taiwan, Love River (TPE)
1st in Stage 7 Tour de Taiwan, Jingmao (TPE)
2009
1st Point Race, Track World Cup, Copenhagen
2010
1st Road Race, Asian Games
2nd Point Race, Asian Games
2012
1st Stage 2 Tour de Taiwan
37th overall Men's road race, Summer Olympics

== 2009 National Games assault incident ==
In the week of 16 October, Wong Kam-po was preparing for the 11th National Games in Shandong. In preparing for the event, Wong and his team were 10 minutes early, and the security guards did not let them enter the venue. The team was then assaulted by the security. Cyclist Wong Kam-po was pushed down to the floor by the guards. Hong Kong Sports Institute coach Zhang Pak-ming (張百鳴) was surrounded by four security guards and beaten. His leg was injured. A threat was also made to destroy the Hong Kong team's car. The incident was reported to the police, after which they were allowed to enter the venue. President of the Sports Federation and Olympic Committee of Hong Kong, China, Timothy Fok, expressed concern about the case.

== See also ==
- Kwok Ho Ting, another World Champion track cyclist from Hong Kong
- Wai Sze Lee, Hong Kong track racing cyclist

Summer Olympics
Preceded by Sherry Tsai	Flagbearer for Hong Kong; Beijing 2008	Succeeded by Lee Wai-sze
