= Cycling at the 2010 Asian Games – Men's road race =

Men's road race at the 2010 Asian Games
- Venue: Guangzhou Triathlon Venue
- Date: 22 November 2010
- Competitors: 41 from 22 nations

Medalists
gold medal	Wong Kam Po	Hong Kong
silver medal	Takashi Miyazawa	Japan
bronze medal	Zou Rongxi	China

The men's 180 kilometres road race competition at the 2010 Asian Games was held on 22 November.

Park Sung-baek of South Korea originally won the race, but was relegated to 19th place for dangerous sprinting.

== Schedule ==
All times are China Standard Time (UTC+08:00)

Date	Time	Event
Monday, 22 November 2010	09:00	Final

== Results ==
Legend

- DNF — Did not finish
- DNS — Did not start

Rank	Athlete	Time
1st place, gold medalist(s)	Wong Kam Po (HKG)	4:14:54
2nd place, silver medalist(s)	Takashi Miyazawa (JPN)	4:14:54
3rd place, bronze medalist(s)	Zou Rongxi (CHN)	4:14:54
4	Lee Wei-cheng (TPE)	4:14:54
5	Bùi Minh Thụy (VIE)	4:14:54
6	Maxim Iglinskiy (KAZ)	4:14:54
7	Eugen Wacker (KGZ)	4:14:54
8	Sergey Lagutin (UZB)	4:14:54
9	Mehdi Sohrabi (IRI)	4:14:54
10	Sayed Ahmed Alawi (BRN)	4:14:54
11	Ruslan Karimov (UZB)	4:14:54
12	Shinri Suzuki (JPN)	4:14:54
13	Jang Kyung-gu (KOR)	4:14:54
14	Mansoor Jawad (BRN)	4:14:54
15	Narangiin Khangarid (MGL)	4:14:54
16	Tuulkhangain Tögöldör (MGL)	4:14:54
17	Ji Xitao (CHN)	4:14:54
18	Anuar Manan (MAS)	4:14:54
19	Park Sung-baek (KOR)	4:14:54
20	Kwok Ho Ting (HKG)	4:15:01
21	Laxman Wijerathna (SRI)	4:15:04
22	Choi Heng Wa (MAC)	4:15:04
23	Ryan Ariehaan Hilmant (INA)	4:15:07
24	Irish Valenzuela (PHI)	4:15:07
25	Sultan Assiri (KSA)	4:15:11
26	Lloyd Reynante (PHI)	4:15:14
27	Sombir (IND)	4:15:15
28	Adiq Husainie Othman (MAS)	4:15:15
29	Ayman Al-Habriti (KSA)	4:15:19
30	Fadi Shaikhouni (SYR)	4:15:19
31	Khalil Al-Rahman (QAT)	4:15:30
32	Atul Kumar (IND)	4:15:59
33	Feng Chun-kai (TPE)	4:16:48
34	Hassan Maleki (IRI)	4:17:05
—	Tonton Susanto (INA)	DNF
—	Valentin Iglinskiy (KAZ)	DNF
—	Yousif Mirza (UAE)	DNF
—	Mohammed Al-Murawwi (UAE)	DNF
—	Mai Nguyễn Hưng (VIE)	DNF
—	Cheang Tong Hin (MAC)	DNF
—	Ahmed Al-Bardiny (QAT)	DNS
