= Sandra Wu =

Malaysian squash player (born 1976)

Personal information
- Full name: Sandra Wu Pom San
- Born: 16 May 1976 (age 50)
- Years active: 1991-1999

Sport
- Country: Malaysia

Sandra Wu Pom San (born 16 May 1976) is a Malaysian retired professional squash player who is also the former national no 1 player and a cancer survivor. She has played for Malaysia from 1991 to 1999. Sandra confronted with breast cancer in January 2018. She also took part in the 2018 Asia Pacific Masters Games and claimed gold medal in women's 1500m event.

== Career ==
Sandra Wu represented Malaysia at the 1991 Southeast Asian Games before winning 1992 Asian Individual Junior Squash Championships. She was defeated by former Singaporean number one player Mah Li Lian at the 1992 and 1994 Asian Individual Squash Championships finals before losing to Malaysian counterpart Nicol David at the 1998 Asian Squash Championships.

Wu began her coaching career in 2004 with having brief stint with Malaysian women's squash team between 2005 and 2006. She also went on to become the head coach for the Singapore women's squash team in 2007 and coached until 2016 before becoming the team's technical director. She started a squash academy in Singapore along with former Singaporean squash player Della Lee.
