= 1996 China Masters =

Invitational snooker tournament

China Masters
Tournament information
- Venue: Haidian Gymnasium, Beijing
- Country: China
- Format: Non-ranking event
- Winner's share: £4,000
- Highest break: Shokat Ali (PAK), 133

Final
- Champion: Rod Lawler (ENG)
- Runner-up: Shokat Ali (PAK)
- Score: 6–3

The 1996 Strachan China Masters was an invitational non-ranking snooker tournament held at the Haidian Gymnasium in Beijing, China in 1996. Rod Lawler won the tournament defeating Shokat Ali 6–3 in the final. Ali compiled the highest break of the tournament, 133.

== Results ==
Last 16; Best of 7 frames
(England) Rod Lawler | 4
(China) Zhang Kai | 0
(Republic of Ireland) David McDonnell | 4
(Malaysia) Sammy Chong | 3
(Wales) Matthew Stevens | 4
(Afghanistan) Saleh Mohammad | 2
(Thailand) Tai Pichit | 4
(China) Pang Weiguo | 2
(Pakistan) Shokat Ali | 4
(Belgium) Yvan van Velthoven | 0
(China) Guo Hua | 4
(Thailand) Kwan Poomjang | 0
(Republic of Ireland) Fergal O'Brien | 4
(Thailand) Noppadon Noppachorn | 3
(China) Da Hai Lin | 4
(China) Tao Shan | 2

Quarter-finals; Best of 7 frames
(England) Rod Lawler | 4
(Republic of Ireland) David McDonnell | 2
(Wales) Matthew Stevens | 4
(Thailand) Tai Pichit | 1
(Pakistan) Shokat Ali | 4
(China) Guo Hua | 3
(Republic of Ireland) Fergal O'Brien | 4
(China) Da Hai Lin | 2

Semi-finals; Best of 9 frames
(England) Rod Lawler | 5
(Wales) Matthew Stevens | 4
(Pakistan) Shokat Ali | 5
(Republic of Ireland) Fergal O'Brien | 2

Final; Best of 11 frames
(England) Rod Lawler | 6
(Pakistan) Shokat Ali | 3
