= Karate at the 1998 Asian Games =

Karate competition

- Venue: Thammasat Gymnasium 7
- Dates: 15–17 December 1998

Karate was competed by men and women at the 1998 Asian Games in Rangsit Sports Complex, Bangkok, Thailand. Kata was contested along with Kumite. There were 11 gold medals contested for this sport. All competition took place on December 15, 16 and 17.

== Medalists ==
=== Men ===
Event	Gold	Silver	Bronze
Kata	Ryoki Abe; Japan	Alaeddin Nekoufar; Iran	Abdullah Kadir; Indonesia
Kumite −55 kg	Muralitharan Chandra; Malaysia	Bader Al-Otaibi; Kuwait	Isfan Tanjung; Indonesia
Kumite −55 kg	Muralitharan Chandra; Malaysia	Bader Al-Otaibi; Kuwait	Lê Tùng Dương; Vietnam
Kumite −60 kg	Arief Taufan Syamsuddin; Indonesia	None awarded	Sambar Bahadur Gole; Nepal
Kumite −60 kg	Arief Taufan Syamsuddin; Indonesia	None awarded	Adnan Laoundi; Syria
Kumite −65 kg	Norihide Narazaki; Japan	Chen Teng-tien; Chinese Taipei	Đỗ Tuấn Cương; Vietnam
Kumite −65 kg	Norihide Narazaki; Japan	Chen Teng-tien; Chinese Taipei	Eakarach Loongban; Thailand
Kumite −70 kg	Muniandy Rajoo; Malaysia	Mehdi Amouzadeh; Iran	Raafat Al-Karad; Syria
Kumite −70 kg	Muniandy Rajoo; Malaysia	Mehdi Amouzadeh; Iran	Shizuo Shiina; Japan
Kumite −75 kg	Alireza Katiraei; Iran	Takahiro Niki; Japan	Arivalagan Ponniah; Malaysia
Kumite −75 kg	Alireza Katiraei; Iran	Takahiro Niki; Japan	Ahmad Al-Khaledi; Kuwait
Kumite +75 kg	Jaber Al-Hammad; Kuwait	Ali Shaterzadeh; Iran	Suresh Rao Subramaniam; Malaysia
Kumite +75 kg	Jaber Al-Hammad; Kuwait	Ali Shaterzadeh; Iran	Chu Tien-lai; Chinese Taipei

=== Women ===
Event	Gold	Silver	Bronze
Kata	Atsuko Wakai; Japan	Omita Olga Ompi; Indonesia	Lim Lee Lee; Malaysia
Kumite −53 kg	Eri Fujioka; Japan	Sandra Aryani; Indonesia	Chang Chin-chih; Chinese Taipei
Kumite −53 kg	Eri Fujioka; Japan	Sandra Aryani; Indonesia	Phạm Hồng Hà; Vietnam
Kumite −60 kg	Li Wan-yu; Chinese Taipei	Phạm Hồng Thắm; Vietnam	Nilawati Daud; Indonesia
Kumite −60 kg	Li Wan-yu; Chinese Taipei	Phạm Hồng Thắm; Vietnam	Phetlada Ausabay; Thailand
Kumite +60 kg	Izumi Nabeki; Japan	Panadda Tamchuchaichana; Thailand	Premila Supramaniam; Malaysia
Kumite +60 kg	Izumi Nabeki; Japan	Panadda Tamchuchaichana; Thailand	Hà Thị Kiều Trang; Vietnam

== Medal table ==
Rank	Nation	Gold	Silver	Bronze	Total
1	Japan (JPN)	5	1	1	7
2	Malaysia (MAS)	2	0	4	6
3	Iran (IRI)	1	3	0	4
4	Indonesia (INA)	1	2	3	6
5	Chinese Taipei (TPE)	1	1	2	4
6	Kuwait (KUW)	1	1	1	3
7	Vietnam (VIE)	0	1	4	5
8	Thailand (THA)	0	1	2	3
9	Syria (SYR)	0	0	2	2
10	Nepal (NEP)	0	0	1	1
Totals (10 entries)		11	10	20	41
