= Mikhail Kim =

Soviet hydraulic engineer and geophysicist

Mikhail Vasilyevich Kim
- Михаил Васильевич Ким
- Born: August 8, 1907
- Died: September 4, 1970 (aged 63); Krasnoyarsk, Soviet Union
- Citizenship: Soviet Union
- Awards: Lenin Prize
- Scientific career
- Fields: hydraulic engineering

Mikhail Vasilyevich Kim (Russian: Михаил Васильевич Ким; 8 August 1907 – 4 September 1970) was a Soviet hydraulic engineer and geophysicist. He was awarded the Lenin Prize in 1966 for his work on permafrost engineering, particularly pioneering the use of deep piling to elevate a building's foundation, keeping it from warming the ground below.

== Biography ==
Kim was born into a Korean family in the village of Kedrovaya Pad, Primorsky Region in the Russian Far East. From 1923 he lived in Vladivostok and from 1927 in Leningrad. He graduated from the workers' faculty at the Far Eastern Federal University (1927) and the Leningrad Polytechnic Institute (1932).

Kim was arrested on October 5, 1935, and accused of founding a counter-revolutionary group with ties with anti-party groups in Korea and Manchuria, etc. He was sentenced to 4 years of imprisonment, which he served at Norillag in Norilsk as a hydraulic engineer and senior foreman.

He was released on March 1, 1939, and became head of the permafrost station and the head of the survey department of the design office of the Norilsk Combine.

In 1966, he was awarded the Lenin Prize for his participation in the creation of the theory of pile foundations: he proved that houses on piles with a ventilated underground, if properly operated, will stand firmly.

He died on September 4, 1970, in Krasnoyarsk during a meeting on construction issues in Siberia and the Far East.
