= Shokat Ali (snooker player) =

Pakistani snooker player

Personal information
- Born: March 4, 1970 (age 56)

Sport
- Country: Pakistan
- Sport: Snooker
- Professional: 1991–2007
- Highest ranking: 34 (2002/2003)
- Best ranking finish: Quarter-final (x1)
Medal record
Men's snooker
Representing Pakistan
Asian Games
Gold medal – first place	1998 Bangkok	Individual
Bronze medal – third place	1998 Bangkok	Doubles
Bronze medal – third place	1998 Bangkok	Team
World Games
Bronze medal – third place	2001 Akita	Individual

Shokat Ali (born 4 March 1970) is a snooker player who has represented Pakistan in international tournaments.

== Career ==
Ali turned professional in 1991. He appeared on the BBC1 game programme Big Break in 1997.

At the 1998 Asian Games, he won a gold medal in the snooker singles, a bronze medal in the snooker doubles and a bronze medal in the snooker team event.

He defeated Jimmy White to reach the last 16 of the 1998 Grand Prix. At the 2001 Thailand Masters, Ali reached the quarter-finals, beating Ronnie O'Sullivan en route.

In 2005, his cue was stolen from his car parked at his garage in Lancashire, and he suffered a deterioration of results as he struggled to find another cue he could show his best form using.

He represented Pakistan in the 2006 Asian Games held in Doha, Qatar.

He dropped off the game's main professional tour in 2007, but showed signs of a return to form in 2008, winning an event on the secondary PIOS Tour.

== Personal life ==
He runs Elite Snooker Club in Lostock Hall, Lancashire along with fellow professional player, Chris Norbury.

== Performance and rankings timeline ==
Tournament	1991/ 92	1992/ 93	1993/ 94	1994/ 95	1995/ 96	1996/ 97	1997/ 98	1998/ 99	1999/ 00	2000/ 01	2001/ 02	2002/ 03	2003/ 04		2004/ 05	2005/ 06	2006/ 07
Ranking (Note: From the 2010/2011 season it shows the ranking at the beginning of the season.)	(Note: New players on the Main Tour don't have a ranking.)	143	110	83	87	76	59	49	69	68	40	34	49		65	54	55
Ranking tournaments
Northern Ireland Trophy	Tournament Not Held															NR	LQ
Grand Prix (Note: The event was also called the LG Cup (2001/2002–2003/2004))	LQ	LQ	LQ	1R	2R	LQ	LQ	3R	LQ	1R	1R	2R	LQ		1R	LQ	LQ
UK Championship	1R	LQ	LQ	LQ	LQ	2R	2R	LQ	2R	LQ	1R	LQ	LQ		1R	LQ	LQ
Malta Cup (Note: The event was called the European Open (1991/1992–2003/2004) and the Irish Open (1998/1999))	LQ	LQ	LQ	LQ	LQ	LQ	NH	LQ	Not Held		LQ	LQ	LQ		LQ	LQ	LQ
Welsh Open	LQ	1R	LQ	LQ	LQ	2R	LQ	LQ	1R	LQ	LQ	LQ	LQ		2R	LQ	LQ
China Open (Note: The event was called the China International (1997/1998–1998/1999))	Tournament Not Held						NR	LQ	2R	LQ	LQ	Not Held			LQ	LQ	LQ
World Championship	LQ	LQ	LQ	LQ	LQ	LQ	LQ	LQ	LQ	LQ	LQ	LQ	LQ		LQ	LQ	LQ
Non-ranking tournaments
The Masters	LQ	LQ	LQ	A	LQ	LQ	LQ	LQ	LQ	LQ	LQ	LQ	LQ		A	A	A
Former ranking tournaments
Classic	LQ	Tournament Not Held															
Strachan Open (Note: The event was called the Strachan Challenge (1992/1993–1993/1994))	LQ	MR	NR	Tournament Not Held													
Dubai Classic (Note: The event was called the Thailand Classic (1995/1996) and the Asian Classic (1996/1997))	LQ	3R	LQ	LQ	LQ	LQ	Tournament Not Held										
German Masters (Note: The event was called the German Open (1995/1996–1997/1998))	Tournament Not Held				LQ	LQ	2R	NR	Tournament Not Held								
Malta Grand Prix	Not Held			Non-Ranking Event					LQ	NR	Tournament Not Held						
Thailand Masters (Note: The event was called the Asian Open (1991/1992–1992/1993) and the Thailand Open (1993/1994–1996/1997))	LQ	1R	LQ	LQ	LQ	LQ	LQ	LQ	LQ	QF	LQ	NR	Not Held				NR
Scottish Open (Note: The event was called the International Open (1992/1993–1996/1997) and the Players Championship (2003/2004))	NH	LQ	LQ	LQ	LQ	2R	1R	LQ	LQ	LQ	1R	LQ	LQ		Not Held		
British Open	LQ	LQ	LQ	LQ	LQ	1R	1R	LQ	LQ	2R	1R	LQ	LQ		LQ	Not Held	
Irish Masters	Non-Ranking Event											LQ	LQ		LQ	NH	NR
Former non-ranking tournaments
China Masters	Tournament Not Held				F	Tournament Not Held											
Pakistan Masters	Tournament Not Held				1R	Tournament Not Held											
Malta Masters	Tournament Not Held				1R	Tournament Not Held											
Poland Masters	Tournament Not Held				QF	Tournament Not Held											
Euro-Asia Masters Challenge	Tournament Not Held												RR	RR	Not Held		

Performance Table Legend
LQ	lost in the qualifying draw	#R	lost in the early rounds of the tournament (WR = Wildcard round, RR = Round robin)	QF	lost in the quarter-finals
SF	lost in the semi-finals	F	lost in the final	W	won the tournament
DNQ	did not qualify for the tournament	A	did not participate in the tournament	WD	withdrew from the tournament
DQ	disqualified from the tournament				

NH / Not Held	event was not held.
NR / Non-Ranking Event	event is/was no longer a ranking event.
R / Ranking Event	event is/was a ranking event.
MR / Minor-Ranking Event	means an event is/was a minor-ranking event.
PA / Pro-am Event	means an event is/was a pro-am event.

== Career finals ==
=== Non-ranking finals: 2 (1 title) ===
Outcome	No.	Year	Championship	Opponent in the final	Score
Runner-up	1.	1996	China Masters	(England) Rod Lawler	3–6
Winner	1.	1998	Asian Games	(Malaysia) Sam Chong	7–6

=== Amateur finals: 1 (1 title) ===
Outcome	No.	Year	Championship	Opponent in the final	Score
Winner	1.	2008	PIOS – Event 3	(Wales) Michael White	6–3
