= Mah Li Lian =

Singaporean squash player (born 1968)

Personal information
- Born: 24 May 1968 (age 58) Singapore
- Height: 167 cm (5 ft 6 in)

Sport
- Highest ranking: 52 (16 November 1991)
Medal record
Representing Singapore
Women's squash
Asian Squash Championships
Gold medal – first place	1988 Kuwait City	individual
Gold medal – first place	1990 Kolkata	individual
Gold medal – first place	1992 Peshawar	individual
Gold medal – first place	1994 Kuala Lumpur	individual
Asian Games
Bronze medal – third place	1998 Pattaya	singles
Southeast Asian Games
Gold medal – first place	1991 Manila	singles
Gold medal – first place	1995 Chiang Mai	singles
Silver medal – second place	1995 Chiang Mai	women's team

Mah Li Lian PBM (born 24 May 1968) is a Singaporean former professional squash player. She is regarded as the greatest ever squash player to represent Singapore on the international circuit. Mah won the Asian Individual Squash Championships on four successive times in 1988, 1990, 1992 and in 1994. She was the first Singaporean player to win Asian Squash Women's singles Championships twice and held the record for winning the most number of Asian Individual Squash Championships until 2006 which was broken by Malaysian veteran Nicol David.

== Education ==
In October 1992, Mah went to study Physical Education at Loughborough University at Leicestershire, England.

== Squash career ==
Mah won the women's single Squash gold medal at the 1991 Southeast Asian Games held at Manila, Philippines.

Mah was awarded the Sportsgirl of the Year in 1986 and the Sportswoman of the Year in 1988 and 1991.

In 1992, Mah was awarded the Public Service Medal.

Mah won the women’s team gold medal with Della Lee, Lina Ong and Josephine Choo at the 1993 Southeast Asian Games held in Singapore.

In 1994, Mah beat Malaysian Sandra Wu to win her fourth Asian Individual Squash Championships. Mah also won the women team's gold medal, with Lee and Choo, at the 1994 East Asian Squash Championships.

Mah won the women's single gold and the women's team silver at the 1995 Southeast Asian Games held at Chiang Mai, Thailand.

Mah competed at her maiden Asian Games event in 1998 and claimed a bronze medal in the women's singles.

== Personal life ==
Mah worked as a physical education teacher at Outram Institute.

Contributions and Legacy

Promotion of Squash: Beyond her competitive career, Mah Li Lian has been involved in promoting squash in Singapore. She has contributed to the development of the sport by coaching youth athletes.
