= Jordan at the 1998 Asian Games =

- IOC code: JOR
- NOC: Jordan Olympic Committee

in Bangkok
- Medals Ranked 25th: Gold 0 Silver 3 Bronze 2 Total 5

Asian Games appearances (overview)
- 1986; 1990; 1994; 1998; 2002; 2006; 2010; 2014; 2018; 2022; 2026

Jordan participated in the 1998 Asian Games held in Bangkok, Thailand from December 6, 1998 to December 20, 1998. Athletes from Jordan succeeded in winning three silvers and two bronzes, making total five medals. Jordan finished at 25th position in a medal table.
