= Pakistan at the 1998 Asian Games =

- IOC code: PAK
- NOC: Pakistan Olympic Association

in Bangkok
- Medals Ranked 16th: Gold 2 Silver 4 Bronze 9 Total 15

Asian Games appearances (overview)
- 1954; 1958; 1962; 1966; 1970; 1974; 1978; 1982; 1986; 1990; 1994; 1998; 2002; 2006; 2010; 2014; 2018; 2022; 2026

Pakistan participated in the 1998 Asian Games in Bangkok, Thailand from 6 to 20 December 1998. It won 2 gold, 4 silver and 9 bronze medals.

== Medallists ==
| Medal | Name | Sport | Discipline | Date |
|---|---|---|---|---|
| Gold | Zarak Jahan Khan | Squash | Men - individual | |
| Gold | Shokat Ali | Snooker | Men - individual | |
| Silver | Amjad Khan | Squash | Men - individual | |
| Silver | Pakistan national kabaddi team | Kabaddi | Men | |

== Cue Sports ==
- Shokat Ali

== Squash ==
- Zarak Jahan Khan
- Amjad Khan
