= Della Lee =

Former Singaporean squash player

Personal information
- Born: Singapore

Sport
- Highest ranking: 66 (May 1999)
Medal record
Representing Singapore
Women's squash
Southeast Asian Games
Silver medal – second place	2001 Penang	team
Bronze medal – third place	2001 Penang	singles
Bronze medal – third place	1998 Pattaya	singles

Della Lee is a Singaporean former professional squash player who currently serves as the coach of the Singapore women's squash team. She has represented Singapore at a number of international competitions, including the Women's World Team Squash Championships, Asian Games, Southeast Asian Games and the Asian Squash Championships. She reached her highest career PSA world ranking of 66 in May 1999.

== Education ==
Lee holds a master's degree in international marketing.

== Career ==
Lee competed at the PSA World Tour from 1997 to 2001 until her retirement. As a part of the PSA World Tour, she represented the Singaporean team which took part at the 1992 Women's World Team Squash Championships as well as at the 1994 Women's World Team Squash Championships.

Lee won the women’s team gold medal with Mah Li Lian, Lina Ong and Josephine Choo at the 1993 Southeast Asian Games held in Singapore.

In 1994, Lee won the women team's gold medal, with Mah and Choo, at the 1994 East Asian Squash Championships.

Lee competed at her maiden Asian Games event in 1998 and claimed a bronze medal in the women's singles.

After winning a silver and a bronze at the 2001 Southeast Asian Games, she retired from playing squash and started a squash academy in Singapore along with former Malaysian squash player Sandra Wu.

Lee was also Singapore national squash team coach.
