= Singapore at the 1998 Asian Games =

- IOC code: SIN
- NOC: Singapore National Olympic Council
- Website: www.singaporeolympics.com (in English)

in Bangkok
- Flag bearer: Vincent Ng (Wushu)
- Medals Ranked 17th: Gold 2 Silver 3 Bronze 9 Total 14

Asian Games appearances (overview)
- 1951; 1954; 1958; 1962; 1966; 1970; 1974; 1978; 1982; 1986; 1990; 1994; 1998; 2002; 2006; 2010; 2014; 2018; 2022; 2026

Singapore participated in the 1998 Asian Games held in Bangkok, Thailand from December 6, 1998 to December 20, 1998. Athletes from Singapore succeeded in winning two golds, three silvers and nine bronzes, making total fourteen medals. Singapore finished seventeenth in a medal table.

== Medalists ==
Medal	Name	Sport	Event
Gold	Siew Shaw Her; Colin Ng	Sailing	Men's 420
Gold	Joan Huang; Naomi Tan	Sailing	Women's 420
Silver	Jesmine Ho	Bowling	Women's masters
Silver	Tan Tiong Boon	Cue sports	Eight-ball singles
Silver	Anthony Kiong	Sailing	OK Dinghy
Bronze	Grace Young; Alice Tay; Jesmine Ho	Bowling	Women's trios
Bronze	Roy Tay	Sailing	Men's Optimist
Bronze	Tan Wearn Haw; Charles Lim	Sailing	Men's 470
Bronze	Tracey Tan	Sailing	Women's Europe
Bronze	Eddie Abdul Kadir; Herwan Abdul Wahid; Mohd Nazri Abdullah; Nurhisham Adam; Raffi Buang; Raimon Budin; Irwan Kamis; Mohd Fami Mohamed; Mislan Munjari; Shamon Sabtu; Shamsaimon Sabtu; Ahmad Yasin	Sepak takraw	Men's team
Bronze	Chng Seng Mok; Lee Wung Yew; Tan Chee Keong	Shooting	Men's double trap team
Bronze	Mah Li Lian	Squash	Women's singles
Bronze	Della Lee	Squash	Women's singles
Bronze	Picasso Tan	Wushu	Men's nanquan
