= Amjad Khan (squash player) =

Pakistani squash player (born 1980)

Personal information
- Born: 25 February 1980 (age 46) Peshawar

Sport
- Country: Pakistan
- Turned pro: 1996
- Coached by: Fahim Gul
- Retired: 2010

Men's Singles
- Highest ranking: 12 (October 1999)
- Title: 7
- Tour final: 12
- Updated on February 2018

Amjad Khan (Urdu: امجد خان; born February 25, 1980) is a Pakistani former professional squash player.

He has won a total of 7 PSA titles. His last two titles came in 2000, first at the Pakistan circuit event II, followed by the Pakistan circuit event IV.

While representing Pakistan at the 1998 Asian Games, Khan won the silver medal in the men's singles event.
