= Kuwait at the 1998 Asian Games =

- IOC code: KUW
- NOC: Kuwait Olympic Committee

in Bangkok
- Medals Ranked 14th: Gold 4 Silver 6 Bronze 4 Total 14

Asian Games appearances (overview)
- 1974; 1978; 1982; 1986; 1990; 1994; 1998; 2002; 2006; 2010; 2014; 2018; 2022; 2026

Other related appearances
- Athletes from Kuwait (2010)

Kuwait participated in the 1998 Asian Games held in Bangkok, Thailand from December 6, 1998 to December 20, 1998. Athletes from Kuwait succeeded in winning 4 golds, 6 silvers and 4 bronzes, making total 14 medals. Kuwait finished fourteenth in a medal table.
