= Swimming at the 2002 Asian Games =

- Venue: Sajik Swimming Pool
- Dates: 30 September – 5 October 2002
- Competitors: 220 from 28 nations

Swimming was contested from September 30 to October 5 at the 2002 Asian Games in Busan, South Korea.

== Schedule ==
| H | Heats | F | Final |

| Event↓/Date → | 30th Mon | | 1st Tue | | 2nd Wed | | 3rd Thu | | 4th Fri | | 5th Sat | |
|---|---|---|---|---|---|---|---|---|---|---|---|---|
| Men's 50 m freestyle | | | | | | | | | | | H | F |
| Men's 100 m freestyle | | | | | | | H | F | | | | |
| Men's 200 m freestyle | | | H | F | | | | | | | | |
| Men's 400 m freestyle | | | | | H | F | | | | | | |
| Men's 1500 m freestyle | | | | | | | | | F | | | |
| Men's 100 m backstroke | | | | | | | H | F | | | | |
| Men's 200 m backstroke | | | | | | | | | | | H | F |
| Men's 100 m breaststroke | H | F | | | | | | | | | | |
| Men's 200 m breaststroke | | | | | H | F | | | | | | |
| Men's 100 m butterfly | | | | | | | H | F | | | | |
| Men's 200 m butterfly | | | H | F | | | | | | | | |
| Men's 200 m individual medley | H | F | | | | | | | | | | |
| Men's 400 m individual medley | | | | | | | | | H | F | | |
| Men's 4 × 100 m freestyle relay | | | | | H | F | | | | | | |
| Men's 4 × 200 m freestyle relay | F | | | | | | | | | | | |
| Men's 4 × 100 m medley relay | | | | | | | | | H | F | | |
| Women's 50 m freestyle | | | | | | | | | H | F | | |
| Women's 100 m freestyle | | | | | H | F | | | | | | |
| Women's 200 m freestyle | H | F | | | | | | | | | | |
| Women's 400 m freestyle | | | | | | | H | F | | | | |
| Women's 800 m freestyle | | | | | | | | | | | F | |
| Women's 100 m backstroke | | | | | H | F | | | | | | |
| Women's 200 m backstroke | | | | | | | | | H | F | | |
| Women's 100 m breaststroke | | | H | F | | | | | | | | |
| Women's 200 m breaststroke | | | | | | | H | F | | | | |
| Women's 100 m butterfly | | | | | H | F | | | | | | |
| Women's 200 m butterfly | H | F | | | | | | | | | | |
| Women's 200 m individual medley | | | H | F | | | | | | | | |
| Women's 400 m individual medley | | | | | | | | | | | H | F |
| Women's 4 × 100 m freestyle relay | | | | | | | F | | | | | |
| Women's 4 × 200 m freestyle relay | | | F | | | | | | | | | |
| Women's 4 × 100 m medley relay | | | | | | | | | | | F | |

== Medalists ==
=== Men ===
| Event | Gold | | Silver | | Bronze | |
|---|---|---|---|---|---|---|
| 50 m freestyle | Kim Min-suk; South Korea | 22.86 | Shared gold | | Issei Nakanishi; Japan | 23.14 |
| 50 m freestyle | Ravil Nachaev; Uzbekistan | 22.86 | Shared gold | | Issei Nakanishi; Japan | 23.14 |
| 100 m freestyle | Chen Zuo; China | 50.76 | Liu Yu; China | 50.83 | Daisuke Hosokawa; Japan | 51.22 |
| 200 m freestyle | Liu Yu; China | 1:49.29; GR | Yoshihiro Okumura; Japan | 1:49.36 | Yosuke Ichikawa; Japan | 1:50.66 |
| 400 m freestyle | Shunichi Fujita; Japan | 3:50.41; GR | Yu Cheng; China | 3:54.57 | Han Kyu-chul; South Korea | 3:56.10 |
| 1500 m freestyle | Yu Cheng; China | 15:10.99; AR | Cho Sung-mo; South Korea | 15:12.32 | Han Kyu-chul; South Korea | 15:22.38 |
| 100 m backstroke | Atsushi Nishikori; Japan | 55.17 | Alex Lim; Malaysia | 55.18 | Tomomi Morita; Japan | 55.32 |
| 200 m backstroke | Wu Peng; China | 2:00.40 | Takashi Nakano; Japan | 2:00.76 | Naoya Sonoda; Japan | 2:01.22 |
| 100 m breaststroke | Kosuke Kitajima; Japan | 1:00.45; GR | Zeng Qiliang; China | 1:03.04 | Yoshihisa Yamaguchi; Japan | 1:03.22 |
| 200 m breaststroke | Kosuke Kitajima; Japan | 2:09.97; WR | Daisuke Kimura; Japan | 2:13.60 | Ratapong Sirisanont; Thailand | 2:15.81 |
| 100 m butterfly | Takashi Yamamoto; Japan | 52.59; GR | Kohei Kawamoto; Japan | 53.22 | Jin Hao; China | 53.56 |
| 200 m butterfly | Wu Peng; China | 1:56.63; GR | Takashi Yamamoto; Japan | 1:57.18 | Takeshi Matsuda; Japan | 1:57.26 |
| 200 m individual medley | Takahiro Mori; Japan | 2:00.53; AR | Jiro Miki; Japan | 2:02.07 | Ouyang Kunpeng; China | 2:03.34 |
| 400 m individual medley | Wu Peng; China | 4:15.38; AR | Takahiro Mori; Japan | 4:16.63 | Shinya Taniguchi; Japan | 4:17.03 |
| 4 × 100 m freestyle relay | China; Huang Shaohua; Jin Hao; Chen Zuo; Liu Yu | 3:21.07; AR | Japan; Naoki Nagura; Yoshihiro Okumura; Daisuke Hosokawa; Hiroaki Akebe | 3:23.43 | South Korea; Sung Min; Koh Yun-ho; Kim Min-suk; Han Kyu-chul | 3:23.58 |
| 4 × 200 m freestyle relay | Japan; Shunichi Fujita; Yoshihiro Okumura; Daisuke Hosokawa; Yosuke Ichikawa | 7:20.59; AR | China; Wu Peng; Chen Zuo; Yu Cheng; Liu Yu | 7:25.36 | South Korea; Choi Won-il; Koh Yun-ho; Kim Bang-hyun; Han Kyu-chul | 7:29.36 |
| 4 × 100 m medley relay | Japan; Atsushi Nishikori; Kosuke Kitajima; Takashi Yamamoto; Yoshihiro Okumura | 3:37.45; AR | China; Ouyang Kunpeng; Zeng Qiliang; Jin Hao; Chen Zuo | 3:42.07 | South Korea; Sung Min; Son Sung-uk; Yoo Jung-nam; Koh Yun-ho | 3:46.44 |

=== Women ===
| Event | Gold | | Silver | | Bronze | |
|---|---|---|---|---|---|---|
| 50 m freestyle | Xu Yanwei; China | 25.42 | Sun So-eun; South Korea | 25.63 | Zhou Xiaowei; China | 25.76 |
| 100 m freestyle | Xu Yanwei; China | 54.92 | Tomoko Nagai; Japan | 55.51 | Shared silver | |
| 100 m freestyle | Xu Yanwei; China | 54.92 | Yang Yu; China | 55.51 | Shared silver | |
| 200 m freestyle | Yang Yu; China | 1:58.43; GR | Xu Yanwei; China | 1:59.42 | Tomoko Nagai; Japan | 2:00.52 |
| 400 m freestyle | Sachiko Yamada; Japan | 4:07.23; GR | Chen Hua; China | 4:12.24 | Tang Jingzhi; China | 4:15.82 |
| 800 m freestyle | Chen Hua; China | 8:25.36; AR | Sachiko Yamada; Japan | 8:28.77 | Zhang Yan; China | 8:44.80 |
| 100 m backstroke | Zhan Shu; China | 1:01.82 | Noriko Inada; Japan | 1:02.16 | Aya Terakawa; Japan | 1:02.35 |
| 200 m backstroke | Reiko Nakamura; Japan | 2:11.44 | Aya Terakawa; Japan | 2:12.38 | Zhan Shu; China | 2:13.25 |
| 100 m breaststroke | Luo Xuejuan; China | 1:06.84; AR | Qi Hui; China | 1:08.35 | Fumiko Kawanabe; Japan | 1:10.11 |
| 200 m breaststroke | Qi Hui; China | 2:24.01; GR | Luo Xuejuan; China | 2:24.67 | Fumiko Kawanabe; Japan | 2:29.82 |
| 100 m butterfly | Zhou Yafei; China | 58.88 | Yuko Nakanishi; Japan | 1:00.18 | Joscelin Yeo; Singapore | 1:01.06 |
| 200 m butterfly | Yuko Nakanishi; Japan | 2:08.99 | Maki Mita; Japan | 2:11.57 | Liu Yin; China | 2:12.07 |
| 200 m individual medley | Qi Hui; China | 2:13.94 | Zhou Yafei; China | 2:14.67 | Maiko Fujino; Japan | 2:16.37 |
| 400 m individual medley | Qi Hui; China | 4:40.37 | Maiko Fujino; Japan | 4:43.49 | Zhou Yafei; China | 4:47.09 |
| 4 × 100 m freestyle relay | China; Yang Yu; Zhu Yingwen; Ju Jielei; Xu Yanwei | 3:40.95; GR | Japan; Maki Mita; Tomoko Nagai; Norie Urabe; Sachiko Yamada | 3:44.59 | South Korea; Ryu Yoon-ji; Kim Hyun-joo; Shim Min-ji; Sun So-eun | 3:44.81 |
| 4 × 200 m freestyle relay | China; Zhu Yingwen; Tang Jingzhi; Xu Yanwei; Yang Yu | 7:58.46; GR | Japan; Maki Mita; Tomoko Nagai; Sachiko Yamada; Norie Urabe | 8:02.76 | South Korea; Ha Eun-ju; Kim Ye-sul; Kim Hyun-joo; Shim Min-ji | 8:19.62 |
| 4 × 100 m medley relay | China; Zhan Shu; Luo Xuejuan; Zhou Yafei; Xu Yanwei | 4:00.21; AR | Japan; Noriko Inada; Fumiko Kawanabe; Yuko Nakanishi; Tomoko Nagai | 4:05.75 | South Korea; Shim Min-ji; Ku Hyo-jin; Park Kyung-hwa; Sun So-eun | 4:13.41 |

== Medal table ==
| Rank | Nation | Gold | Silver | Bronze | Total |
|---|---|---|---|---|---|
| 1 | China (CHN) | 20 | 11 | 8 | 39 |
| 2 | Japan (JPN) | 11 | 18 | 13 | 42 |
| 3 | South Korea (KOR) | 1 | 2 | 8 | 11 |
| 4 | Uzbekistan (UZB) | 1 | 0 | 0 | 1 |
| 5 | Malaysia (MAS) | 0 | 1 | 0 | 1 |
| 6 | Singapore (SIN) | 0 | 0 | 1 | 1 |
| 6 | Thailand (THA) | 0 | 0 | 1 | 1 |
| Totals (7 entries) | | 33 | 32 | 31 | 96 |

== Participating nations ==
A total of 220 athletes from 28 nations competed in swimming at the 2002 Asian Games:

- Bangladesh (2)
- Cambodia (2)
- China (31)
- Chinese Taipei (5)
- Hong Kong (18)
- India (5)
- Indonesia (1)
- Japan (33)
- Jordan (1)
- Kazakhstan (5)
- Lebanon (2)
- Macau (6)
- Malaysia (7)
- Maldives (2)
- Mongolia (7)
- Nepal (3)
- Pakistan (7)
- Palestine (2)
- Philippines (8)
- Qatar (10)
- Saudi Arabia (4)
- Singapore (10)
- South Korea (32)
- Syria (1)
- Tajikistan (1)
- Thailand (8)
- Uzbekistan (5)
- Vietnam (2)
