= Swimming at the 2002 Asian Games – Men's 4 × 100 metre freestyle relay =

Men's 4 × 100 metre freestyle relay at the 2002 Asian Games
- Venue: Sajik Swimming Pool
- Date: 2 October 2002
- Competitors: 43 from 9 nations

Medalists
gold medal	China; Huang Shaohua, Jin Hao, Chen Zuo, Liu Yu
silver medal	Japan; Naoki Nagura, Yoshihiro Okumura, Daisuke Hosokawa, Hiroaki Akebe
bronze medal	South Korea; Sung Min, Koh Yun-ho, Kim Min-suk, Han Kyu-chul

The men's 4 × 100 metre freestyle relay swimming competition at the 2002 Asian Games in Busan was held on 2 October at the Sajik Swimming Pool.

== Schedule ==
All times are Korea Standard Time (UTC+09:00)

Date	Time	Event
Wednesday, 2 October 2002	10:00	Heats
Wednesday, 2 October 2002	19:00	Final

== Records ==
Prior to this competition, the existing world, Asian and Games records were as follows.

World Record	Australia	3:13.67	Sydney, Australia	16 September 2000
Asian Record	Japan	3:22.01	Fukuoka, Japan	22 July 2001
Games Record	Japan	3:23.80	Hiroshima, Japan	6 October 1994

== Results ==
=== Heats ===
Rank	Heat	Team	Time	Notes
1	1	China (CHN)	3:23.88	
		Huang Shaohua	50.36	GR
		Jin Hao	51.06	
		Shi Cheng	51.54	
		Chen Zuo	50.92	
2	2	Japan (JPN)	3:25.86	
		Yoshihiro Okumura	50.93	
		Yosuke Ichikawa	51.36	
		Jiro Miki	52.40	
		Naoki Nagura	51.17	
3	1	Kazakhstan (KAZ)	3:26.89	
		Andrey Kvassov	51.60	
		Igor Sitnikov	51.11	
		Vyacheslav Titarenko	51.93	
		Oleg Shteynikov	52.25	
4	2	South Korea (KOR)	3:27.75	
		Sung Min	51.34	
		Lee Yong-uk	52.65	
		Park Kyong-ho	52.16	
		Kim Min-suk	51.60	
5	2	Uzbekistan (UZB)	3:31.50	
		Petr Vasiliev	53.71	
		Ravil Nachaev	51.58	
		Albert Galyautdinov	53.47	
		Oleg Pukhnatiy	52.74	
6	2	Hong Kong (HKG)	3:35.09	
		Kenneth Doo	53.22	
		Wong Kwok Kei	55.33	
		Charles Szeto	53.87	
		Harbeth Fu	52.67	
7	1	Singapore (SIN)	3:36.58	
		Ng Cheng Xun	55.84	
		Gary Tan	53.55	
		Gerald Koh	54.21	
		Mark Chay	52.98	
8	2	Macau (MAC)	3:44.87	
		Victor Wong	54.39	
		Tang Chon Kit	54.75	
		Ma Chan Wai	57.62	
		Lou Keng Ip	58.11	
9	1	Mongolia (MGL)	3:57.05	
		Bayar-Erdeniin Sonin-Erdene	1:01.00	
		Andryein Tamir	58.01	
		Ganboldyn Urnultsaikhan	59.84	
		Ganaagiin Galbadrakh	58.20	

=== Final ===
Rank	Team	Time	Notes
1st place, gold medalist(s)	China (CHN)	3:21.07	AR
	Huang Shaohua	50.70	
	Jin Hao	50.63	
	Chen Zuo	50.02	
	Liu Yu	49.72	
2nd place, silver medalist(s)	Japan (JPN)	3:23.43	
	Naoki Nagura	51.48	
	Yoshihiro Okumura	50.06	
	Daisuke Hosokawa	50.67	
	Hiroaki Akebe	51.22	
3rd place, bronze medalist(s)	South Korea (KOR)	3:23.58	
	Sung Min	51.40	
	Koh Yun-ho	50.61	
	Kim Min-suk	50.65	
	Han Kyu-chul	50.92	
4	Kazakhstan (KAZ)	3:27.58	
	Andrey Kvassov	52.02	
	Igor Sitnikov	51.45	
	Vyacheslav Titarenko	51.74	
	Oleg Shteynikov	52.37	
5	Uzbekistan (UZB)	3:29.62	
	Ravil Nachaev	51.84	
	Aleksandr Agafonov	52.44	
	Petr Vasiliev	52.53	
	Oleg Pukhnatiy	52.81	
6	Hong Kong (HKG)	3:30.29	
	Kenneth Doo	53.26	
	Mark Kwok	51.85	
	Charles Szeto	52.94	
	Harbeth Fu	52.24	
7	Singapore (SIN)	3:30.29	
	Gerald Koh	53.23	
	Gary Tan	51.45	
	Ng Cheng Xun	54.70	
	Mark Chay	51.51	
8	Macau (MAC)	3:30.29	
	Tang Chon Kit	54.70	
	Victor Wong	53.69	
	Ma Chan Wai	58.21	
	Lou Keng Ip	57.62	
