= Swimming at the 2002 Asian Games – Men's 4 × 200 metre freestyle relay =

Men's 4 × 200 metre freestyle relay at the 2002 Asian Games
- Venue: Sajik Swimming Pool
- Date: 30 September 2002
- Competitors: 32 from 8 nations

Medalists
gold medal	Japan; Shunichi Fujita, Yoshihiro Okumura, Daisuke Hosokawa, Yosuke Ichikawa
silver medal	China; Wu Peng, Chen Zuo, Yu Cheng, Liu Yu
bronze medal	South Korea; Choi Won-il, Koh Yun-ho, Kim Bang-hyun, Han Kyu-chul

The men's 4 × 200 metre freestyle relay swimming competition at the 2002 Asian Games in Busan was held on 30 September at the Sajik Swimming Pool.

== Schedule ==
All times are Korea Standard Time (UTC+09:00)

Date	Time	Event
Monday, 30 September 2002	19:00	Final

== Records ==
Prior to this competition, the existing world, Asian and Games records were as follows.

World Record	Australia	7:04.66	Fukuoka, Japan	21 July 2001
Asian Record	Japan	7:20.60	Fukuoka, Japan	21 July 2001
Games Record	Japan	7:27.18	Hiroshima, Japan	4 October 1994

== Results ==
Rank	Team	Time	Notes
1st place, gold medalist(s)	Japan (JPN)	7:20.59	AR
	Shunichi Fujita	1:50.14	GR
	Yoshihiro Okumura	1:49.57	
	Daisuke Hosokawa	1:50.60	
	Yosuke Ichikawa	1:50.28	
2nd place, silver medalist(s)	China (CHN)	7:25.36	
	Wu Peng	1:51.33	
	Chen Zuo	1:50.23	
	Yu Cheng	1:53.75	
	Liu Yu	1:50.05	
3rd place, bronze medalist(s)	South Korea (KOR)	7:29.36	
	Choi Won-il	1:54.87	
	Koh Yun-ho	1:50.72	
	Kim Bang-hyun	1:52.85	
	Han Kyu-chul	1:50.92	
4	Kazakhstan (KAZ)	7:44.58	
	Andrey Kvassov	1:54.48	
	Igor Sitnikov	1:55.66	
	Vyacheslav Titarenko	1:55.07	
	Oleg Shteynikov	1:59.37	
5	Hong Kong (HKG)	7:44.73	
	Mark Kwok	1:53.72	
	Charles Szeto	1:56.64	
	Fung Hok Him	1:57.43	
	Chung Kwok Leung	1:56.94	
6	Uzbekistan (UZB)	7:51.23	
	Petr Vasiliev	1:55.68	
	Albert Galyautdinov	1:58.04	
	Aleksandr Agafonov	1:58.57	
	Oleg Pukhnatiy	1:58.94	
7	Saudi Arabia (KSA)	8:20.34	
	Maher Al-Motar	2:01.19	
	Mohammed Al-Yousef	2:02.59	
	Ahmed Al-Kudmani	2:10.43	
	Mohammed Yamani	2:06.13	
8	Qatar (QAT)	8:40.27	
	Moyssara El-Aarag	2:04.88	
	Anas Abu Yousuf	2:04.66	
	Abdulla Al-Ollan	2:12.31	
	Ahmed Salamoun	2:18.42	
