= Swimming at the 2006 Asian Games – Men's 100 metre freestyle =

Men's 100 metre freestyle at the 2006 Asian Games
- Venue: Hamad Aquatic Centre
- Date: 6 December 2006
- Competitors: 42 from 25 nations

Medalists
| gold medal | Chen Zuo | China |
| silver medal | Park Tae-hwan | South Korea |
| bronze medal | Daisuke Hosokawa | Japan |

The men's 100 m freestyle swimming event at the 2006 Asian Games was held on December 6, 2006, at the Hamad Aquatic Centre in Doha, Qatar.

== Schedule ==
All times are Arabia Standard Time (UTC+03:00)

| Date | Time | Event |
|---|---|---|
| Wednesday, 6 December 2006 | 10:13 | Heats |
| Wednesday, 6 December 2006 | 18:06 | Final |

== Records ==
Prior to this competition, the existing world, Asian and Games records were as follows.

| World Record | Pieter van den Hoogenband (NED) | 47.84 | Sydney, Australia | 19 September 2000 |
| Asian Record | Chen Zuo (CHN) | 49.56 | Nanjing, China | 17 October 2005 |
| Games Record | Huang Shaohua (CHN) | 50.36 | Busan, South Korea | 2 October 2002 |

== Results ==
=== Heats ===
| Rank | Heat | Athlete | Time | Notes |
|---|---|---|---|---|
| 1 | 4 | Daisuke Hosokawa (JPN) | 50.83 | |
| 2 | 6 | Park Tae-hwan (KOR) | 50.99 | |
| 3 | 5 | Chen Zuo (CHN) | 51.13 | |
| 4 | 6 | Takamitsu Kojima (JPN) | 51.15 | |
| 5 | 5 | Vitaliy Khan (KAZ) | 51.30 | |
| 6 | 5 | Huang Shaohua (CHN) | 51.38 | |
| 7 | 4 | Alexandr Sklyar (KAZ) | 51.45 | |
| 8 | 5 | Bryan Tay (SIN) | 51.75 | |
| 9 | 4 | Rafed Al-Masri (SYR) | 52.11 | |
| 10 | 4 | Virdhawal Khade (IND) | 52.12 | |
| 11 | 6 | Daniel Bego (MAS) | 52.17 | |
| 12 | 3 | Mohammad Bidarian (IRI) | 52.44 | |
| 13 | 6 | Wang Shao-an (TPE) | 52.62 | |
| 14 | 5 | Gary Tan (SIN) | 52.67 | |
| 15 | 4 | Sung Min (KOR) | 52.77 | |
| 16 | 5 | Kendrick Uy (PHI) | 52.83 | |
| 17 | 5 | Mohammad Madwa (KUW) | 53.06 | |
| 18 | 6 | Ankur Poseria (IND) | 53.22 | |
| 19 | 4 | Petr Vasiliev (UZB) | 53.30 | |
| 20 | 6 | Ravil Nachaev (UZB) | 53.43 | |
| 21 | 6 | Macgyver Tse (HKG) | 53.47 | |
| 22 | 6 | Waleed Al-Qahtani (KUW) | 53.68 | |
| 23 | 4 | Pasha Vahdati (IRI) | 53.89 | |
| 24 | 3 | Lao Kuan Fong (MAC) | 53.94 | |
| 24 | 3 | Obaid Al-Jasmi (UAE) | 53.94 | |
| 26 | 4 | Philip Yee (HKG) | 54.41 | |
| 27 | 3 | Moyssara El-Aarag (QAT) | 54.56 | |
| 28 | 3 | Anas Abu Yousuf (QAT) | 55.01 | |
| 29 | 2 | Heshan Unamboowe (SRI) | 55.02 | |
| 30 | 2 | Daniel Lee (SRI) | 55.39 | |
| 31 | 3 | Jamil Yamout (LIB) | 56.17 | |
| 32 | 2 | Andryein Tamir (MGL) | 56.41 | |
| 33 | 3 | Mohammed Al-Khudhori (OMA) | 56.47 | |
| 34 | 3 | Rashid Iunusov (KGZ) | 57.56 | |
| 35 | 2 | Fadi Awesat (PLE) | 59.08 | |
| 36 | 2 | Ali Adel (IRQ) | 1:00.12 | |
| 37 | 2 | Mendbayaryn Batchuluun (MGL) | 1:00.15 | |
| 38 | 2 | Issam Halawani (PLE) | 1:01.20 | |
| 39 | 1 | Ali Majeed (IRQ) | 1:02.99 | |
| 40 | 1 | Hassan Ashraf (MDV) | 1:04.42 | |
| 41 | 1 | Ali Mohamed Raaidh (MDV) | 1:06.37 | |
| 42 | 5 | Victor Wong (MAC) | 1:07.67 | |

=== Final ===
| Rank | Athlete | Time | Notes |
|---|---|---|---|
| 1st place, gold medalist(s) | Chen Zuo (CHN) | 49.06 | AR |
| 2nd place, silver medalist(s) | Park Tae-hwan (KOR) | 50.02 | |
| 3rd place, bronze medalist(s) | Daisuke Hosokawa (JPN) | 50.25 | |
| 4 | Huang Shaohua (CHN) | 50.32 | |
| 5 | Takamitsu Kojima (JPN) | 50.47 | |
| 6 | Vitaliy Khan (KAZ) | 51.05 | |
| 7 | Alexandr Sklyar (KAZ) | 51.07 | |
| 8 | Bryan Tay (SIN) | 51.44 | |
