= Swimming at the 2002 Asian Games – Men's 4 × 100 metre medley relay =

Men's 4 × 100 metre medley relay at the 2002 Asian Games
- Venue: Sajik Swimming Pool
- Date: 4 October 2002
- Competitors: 49 from 10 nations

Medalists
gold medal	Japan; Atsushi Nishikori, Kosuke Kitajima, Takashi Yamamoto, Yoshihiro Okumura
silver medal	China; Ouyang Kunpeng, Zeng Qiliang, Jin Hao, Chen Zuo
bronze medal	South Korea; Sung Min, Son Sung-uk, Yoo Jung-nam, Koh Yun-ho

The men's 4 × 100 metre medley relay swimming competition at the 2002 Asian Games in Busan was held on 4 October at the Sajik Swimming Pool.

== Schedule ==
All times are Korea Standard Time (UTC+09:00)

Date	Time	Event
Friday, 4 October 2002	10:00	Heats
Friday, 4 October 2002	19:00	Final

== Records ==
Prior to this competition, the existing world, Asian and Games records were as follows.

World Record	United States	3:33.48	Yokohama, Japan	29 August 2002
Asian Record	Japan	3:38.88	Osaka, Japan	26 May 2001
Games Record	Japan	3:41.70	Hiroshima, Japan	8 October 1994

== Results ==
=== Heats ===
Rank	Heat	Team	Time	Notes
1	2	Japan (JPN)	3:42.12	
		Tomomi Morita	55.44	
		Yoshihisa Yamaguchi	1:03.05	
		Kohei Kawamoto	53.24	
		Daisuke Hosokawa	50.39	
2	1	South Korea (KOR)	3:51.40	
		Sung Min	58.18	
		Son Sung-uk	1:05.68	
		Yoo Jung-nam	55.47	
		Park Kyong-ho	52.07	
3	2	China (CHN)	3:53.23	
		Ouyang Kunpeng	57.34	
		Cheng Hao	1:06.74	
		Tang Wenjun	56.23	
		Liu Yu	52.92	
4	1	Malaysia (MAS)	3:53.69	
		Alex Lim	57.84	
		Elvin Chia	1:04.21	
		Lubrey Lim	59.33	
		Allen Ong	52.31	
5	1	Hong Kong (HKG)	3:54.01	
		Dickson Fai	1:00.05	
		Tam Chi Kin	1:04.61	
		Mark Kwok	56.86	
		Harbeth Fu	52.49	
6	2	Chinese Taipei (TPE)	3:55.43	
		Wu Nien-pin	59.01	
		Yang Shang-hsuan	1:04.77	
		Tseng Cheng-hua	58.44	
		Wang Shao-an	53.21	
7	1	Kazakhstan (KAZ)	3:58.53	
		Igor Sitnikov	1:00.11	
		Yevgeniy Ryzhkov	1:07.60	
		Vyacheslav Titarenko	58.30	
		Andrey Kvassov	52.52	
8	2	Uzbekistan (UZB)	4:02.49	
		Albert Galyautdinov	1:01.71	
		Oleg Pukhnatiy	1:06.90	
		Petr Vasiliev	58.91	
		Aleksandr Agafonov	54.97	
9	2	Macau (MAC)	4:15.70	
		Tang Chon Kit	1:09.40	
		Ma Chan Wai	1:09.25	
		Victor Wong	58.76	
		Lou Keng Ip	58.29	
10	2	Mongolia (MGL)	4:24.37	
		Ganboldyn Urnultsaikhan	1:07.34	
		Khürleegiin Enkhmandakh	1:15.32	
		Bayar-Erdeniin Sonin-Erdene	1:03.16	
		Ganaagiin Galbadrakh	58.55	

=== Final ===
Rank	Team	Time	Notes
1st place, gold medalist(s)	Japan (JPN)	3:37.45	AR
	Atsushi Nishikori	55.20	
	Kosuke Kitajima	59.81	
	Takashi Yamamoto	52.26	
	Yoshihiro Okumura	50.18	
2nd place, silver medalist(s)	China (CHN)	3:42.07	
	Ouyang Kunpeng	55.28	
	Zeng Qiliang	1:02.13	
	Jin Hao	53.58	
	Chen Zuo	51.08	
3rd place, bronze medalist(s)	South Korea (KOR)	3:46.44	
	Sung Min	56.43	
	Son Sung-uk	1:05.05	
	Yoo Jung-nam	54.71	
	Koh Yun-ho	50.25	
4	Malaysia (MAS)	3:47.07	
	Alex Lim	55.44	
	Elvin Chia	1:03.75	
	Lubrey Lim	56.37	
	Allen Ong	51.51	
5	Chinese Taipei (TPE)	3:49.88	
	Wu Nien-pin	58.32	
	Yang Shang-hsuan	1:03.87	
	Tseng Cheng-hua	56.00	
	Wang Shao-an	51.69	
6	Hong Kong (HKG)	3:51.07	
	Alex Fong	59.75	
	Tam Chi Kin	1:03.81	
	Mark Kwok	55.56	
	Harbeth Fu	51.95	
7	Kazakhstan (KAZ)	3:59.31	
	Igor Sitnikov	1:01.13	
	Yevgeniy Ryzhkov	1:07.63	
	Vyacheslav Titarenko	57.24	
	Andrey Kvassov	53.31	
8	Uzbekistan (UZB)	4:00.90	
	Albert Galyautdinov	1:01.62	
	Oleg Pukhnatiy	1:07.40	
	Petr Vasiliev	58.62	
	Aleksandr Agafonov	53.26	
