= Aquatics at the 2005 East Asian Games =

Aquatics at the 2005 East Asian Games in Macau, included competition in 3 disciplines:

- Swimming (2–6 November); swum in a 50m pool (i.e. "long course meters")
- Diving (30 October - 1 November)
- Synchronized Swimming (3–5 November).

== Swimming ==
=== Schedule ===
Date	Wednesday; 2 November 2005	Thursday; 3 November 2005	Friday; 4 November 2005	Saturday; 5 November 2005	Sunday; 6 November 2005
E v e n t s	200 back (w); 100 breast (m); 100 free (w); 200 IM (m); 50 breast (w); 1500 free (m); 200 fly (w); 4x200 Free Relay (m)	200 free (m); 200 IM (w); 50 fly (m); 50 back (w); 200 back (m); 50 fly (w); 800 free (m); 4x200 Free Relay (w)	200 free (w); 50 back (m); 100 fly (w); 400 IM (m); 100 breast (w); 200 breast (m); 1500 free (w); 4x100 Free Relay (m)	50 free (w); 50 breast (m); 100 back (w); 100 free (m); 400 free (w); 100 fly (m); 200 breast (w); 100 back (m); 4x100 Free Relay (w)	50 free (m); 400 IM (w); 200 fly (m); 800 free (w); 400 free (m); 4x100 Medley Relay (w); 4x100 Medley Relay (m)

Prelims began at 9:00 a.m.; Finals at 7:00 p.m. These Games marked the first time the 50s of stroke (50 back, 50 breast, 50 fly) were sum at the Games; consequently, new Games Records (GR) were established in each of these events.

=== Participating countries ===
- China
- Chinese Taipei
- Guam
- Hong Kong
- North Korea
- Japan
- South Korea
- Macau
- Mongolia

=== Results ===
==== Men ====
Games	Gold		Silver		Bronze	
50m Free	Cai Li; China	22.65	Junya Koga; Japan	23.16	Takeru Sasaki; Japan	23.30
100m Free	Huang Shaohua; China	49.79; GR	Chen Zuo; China	50.09	Hisayoshi Sato; Japan	50.56
200m Free	Zhang Lin; China	1:48.64; GR	HAN Kyuchul (South Korea) Korea	1:50.08	YU Cheng Long; China	1:51.03
400m Free	Park Tae-Hwan (South Korea) Korea	3:48.71; GR	Zhang Lin; China	3:48.94	Takeshi Matsuda; Japan	3:52.52
800m Free	Takeshi Matsuda; Japan	8:03.19	Xin Tong; China	8:09.05	Taishi Okude; Japan	8:10.84
1500m Free	Zhang Lin; China	15:00.27; GR	Park Tae-Hwan (South Korea) Korea	15:00.32	Takeshi Matsuda; Japan	15:37.94
50m Back	Ouyang Kunpeng; China	25.18; GR	Junya Koga; Japan	25.68	Sung Min (South Korea) Korea	25.71
100m Back	Ouyang Kunpeng; China	54.41; GR	Takashi Nakano; Japan	55.36	Masafumi Yamaguchi; Japan	56.15
200m Back	Ouyang Kunpeng; China	1:58.24; GR	Takashi Nakano; Japan	1:58.79	Masafumi Yamaguchi; Japan	2:03.11
50m Breast	Zeng Qiliang; China	27.83; GR	Wang Haibo; China	28.27	You Seung-Hun (South Korea) Korea	29.24
100m Breast	Zeng Qiliang; China	1:02.34	Genki Imamura; Japan	1:02.77	Daisuke Kimura; Japan	1:03.14
200m Breast	Daisuke Kimura; Japan	2:14.67; GR	Xue Ruipeng; China	2:16.18	Genki Imamura; Japan	2:17.61
50m Fly	Zhou Jia Wei; China	23.98; GR	Ryo Takayasu; Japan	24.34	Sung Min (South Korea) Korea	24.81
100m Fly	Zhou Jia Wei; China	52.70; GR	Ryo Takayasu; Japan	53.24	Masahiro Okuno; Japan	54.80
200m Fly	Takeshi Matsuda; Japan	1:56.72; GR	Wu Peng; China	1:57.59	Yoo Jung-Nam (South Korea) Korea	1:59.13
200m IM	Yuta Shoji; Japan	2:02.56	Hidemasa Sano; Japan	2:03.24	Han Kyuchul (South Korea) Korea	2:03.47
400m IM	Wu Peng; China	4:20.50	Hidemasa Sano; Japan; Taishi Okude; Japan	4:23.55	not awarded	
4x100m Free Relay	China; Cai Li, Huang Shaohua, Liu Yu, Chen Zuo	3:20.52; GR	Japan; Takamitsu Kojima, Hisayoshi Sato, Takeshi Matsuda, Junya Koga	3:21.85	(South Korea) Korea; Lim Namgyun, Han Kyuchul, Sung Min, Park Tae-Hwan	3:25.46
4x200m Free Relay	China; Huang Shaohua, Zheng Kunliang, Xin Tong, Yu Cheng Long	7:22.83; GR	(South Korea) Korea; Han Kyuchul, Park Tae-Hwan, Yu Jeong-Nam, Han Kukin	7:25.61	Japan; Takamitsu Kojima, Hisato Matsumoto, Hisayoshi Sato, Takeshi Matsuda	7:27.03
4x100m Medley Relay	China; Ouyang Kunpeng, Zeng Qiliang, Zhou Jia Wei, Chen Zuo	3:39.29; GR	Japan; Takashi Nakano, Genki Imamura, Ryo Takayasu, Hisayoshi Sato	3:40.59	(South Korea) Korea; Sung Min, You Seunghun, Yu Jeonghnam Jeonghnam, Han Kyuchul	3:46.91

==== Women ====
Games	Gold		Silver		Bronze	
50m Free	Zhu Yingwen; China	24.87; GR	Xu Yanwei; China	25.25	Ryu Yoonji (South Korea) Korea	26.12
100m Free	Pang Jiaying; China	54.65; GR	Yang Yu; China	55.53	Ryu Yoonji (South Korea) Korea	55.78
200m Free	Pang Jiaying; China	1:58.49; GR	Yang Yu; China	1:59.62	Yang Chinkuei; Chinese Taipei	2:01.65
400m Free	Zheng Jing; China	4:14.89	Lee Jieun (South Korea) Korea	4:15.72	Yurie Yano; Japan	4:15.93
800m Free	Yang Jieqiao; China	8:39.03	Chen Hua; China	8:39.81	Yurie Yano; Japan	8:43.90
1500m Free	Yang Jieqiao; China	16:24.10	Yurie Yano; Japan	16:34.50	Yumi Kida; Japan	16:42.98
50m Back	Gao Chang; China	28.52; GR	Aya Terakawa; Japan	28.83	Masaki Oikawa; Japan	29.15
100m Back	Gao Chang; China; Aya Terakawa; Japan	1:01.70	not awarded		Chen Yanyan; China	1:02.68
200m Back	Takami Igarashi; Japan; Aya Terakawa; Japan	2:12.15	not awarded		Chen Xiujun; China	2:13.34
50m Breast	Luo Xuejuan; China	31.67; GR	Sayaka Nakamura; Japan	32.67	Kayi Suen; Hong Kong	33.45
100m Breast	Wang Qun; China	1:08.56	Luo Xuejuan; China	1:09.14	Sayaka Nakamura; Japan	1:10.76
200m Breast	Wang Qun; China	2:26.05	Luo Nan; China	2:28.38	Megumi Taneda; Japan	2:29.24
50m Fly	Xu Yanwei; China	26.93; GR	Zhou Yafei; China	26.71	Ayako Doi; Japan	27.34
100m Fly	Zhou Yafei; China	58.43; GR	Xu Yanwei; China	58.92	Yuko Nakanishi; Japan	1:00.31
200m Fly	Li Jie; China	2:10.26 =GR	Yuko Nakanishi; Japan	2:10.39	Huang Xiaotong; China	2:10.88
200m IM	Zhao Jing; China	2:16.00	Jung Jiyeon (South Korea) Korea	2:16.20	Nam Yoosun (South Korea) Korea	2:16.85
400m IM	Jung Jiyeon (South Korea) Korea	4:43.29	Nam Yoosun (South Korea) Korea	4:45.41	Liu Jing; China	4:48.43
4x100m Free Relay	China; Yang Yu, Pang Jiaying, Xu Yanwei, Zhu Yingwen	3:40.79; GR	Japan; Kaori Yamada, Alsumi Yamada, Mai Aoyagi, Kei Aoki	3:48.16	(South Korea) Korea; Lee Nameun, Ryu Yoonji, Park Nari, Kown Youri	3:49.44
4x200m Free Relay	China; Pang Jiaying, Xu Yanwei, Zhu Yingwen, Yang Yu	8:10.26	(South Korea) Korea; Seo Younjeong, Lee Jieun, Park Nari, Jung Eahyun	8:12.30	Japan; Mai Aoyagi, Yumi Kida, Takami Igarashi, Kaori Yamada	8:18.95
4x100m Medley Relay	China; Gao Chang, Luo Xuejuan, Zhou Yafei, Zhu Yingwen	4:02.49; GR	Japan; Aya Terakawa, Sayaka Nakamura, Yuko Nakanishi, Kei Aoki	4:09.10	(South Korea) Korea; Lee Nameun, Jung Seulki, Choi Hyera, Ryu Yoonji	4:12.92

=== Medal table ===
Rank	Nation	Gold	Silver	Bronze	Total
1	China (CHN)	33	14	5	52
2	Japan (JPN)	7	18	20	45
3	South Korea (KOR)	2	7	12	21
4	Chinese Taipei (TPE)	0	0	1	1
4	Hong Kong (HKG)	0	0	1	1
Totals (5 entries)		42	39	39	120

== Diving ==
=== Schedule ===
Date	Sunday; 30 October 2005	Monday; 31 October 2005	Tuesday; 1 November 2005
Events	3m Springboard (m); 1m Springboard (w); 10m Platform-Synchro (m)	1m Springboard (m); 10m Platform-Synchro (w); 3m Springboard (w)	10m Platform (w); 3m Springboard-Synchro (m); 3m Springboard-Synchro (w); 10m Platform (m)

=== Results ===
==== Men ====
Games	Gold	Silver	Bronze
Men's 1m Springboard	Luo Yutong; China	Chen Jiaming; China	Ken Terauchi; Japan
Men's 3m Springboard	Luo Yutong; China	Pan Zhaowei; China	Ken Terauchi; Japan
Men's 3m Synchronised Springboard	China	South Korea	Japan
Men's 10m Platform	Lin Yue; China	Chen Zhang; China	Kin Jinyong; South Korea
Men's 10m Synchronised Platform	China	North Korea	South Korea

==== Women ====
Games	Gold	Silver	Bronze
Women's 1m Springboard	Guo Jingjing; China	Ma Qianli; China	Ryoko Nishii; Japan
Women's 3m Springboard	Ma Qianli; China	Ryoko Nishii; Japan	Xu Mian; China
Women's 3m Synchronised Springboard	China	Japan	Chinese Taipei
Women's 10m Platform	Jiang Lishuang; China	Wang Han; China	Hong Insun; North Korea
Women's 10m Synchronised Platform	North Korea	China	Japan

=== Medal table ===
Rank	Nation	Gold	Silver	Bronze	Total
1	China (CHN)	9	6	1	16
2	North Korea (PRK)	1	1	1	3
3	Japan (JPN)	0	2	5	7
4	South Korea (KOR)	0	1	2	3
5	Chinese Taipei (TPE)	0	0	1	1
Totals (5 entries)		10	10	10	30

== Synchronised swimming ==
=== Schedule ===
Date	Thursday; 3 November 2005	Friday; 4 November 2005	Saturday; 5 November 2005
Events	Solo - Technical; Duet - Technical	Solo - Free	Duet - Free

=== Results ===
Games	Gold	Silver	Bronze
Women's solo	Emiko Suzuki; Japan	Sun Wenyan; China	Yoo Nami; South Korea
Women's duet	Japan	China	South Korea

=== Medal table ===
Rank	Nation	Gold	Silver	Bronze	Total
1	Japan (JPN)	2	0	0	2
2	China (CHN)	0	2	0	2
3	South Korea (KOR)	0	0	2	2
Totals (3 entries)		2	2	2	6

== See also ==
- Aquatics at the 2005 Southeast Asian Games
