= Swimming at the 2006 Asian Games – Men's 4 × 100 metre freestyle relay =

Men's 4 × 100 metre freestyle relay at the 2006 Asian Games
- Venue: Hamad Aquatic Centre
- Date: 5 December 2006
- Competitors: 62 from 15 nations

Medalists
gold medal	Japan; Takamitsu Kojima, Hiroaki Yamamoto, Makoto Ito, Daisuke Hosokawa
silver medal	China; Huang Shaohua, Chen Zuo, Cai Li, Qu Jingyu
bronze medal	South Korea; Han Kyu-chul, Sung Min, Lim Nam-gyun, Park Tae-hwan

The men's 4 × 100 m freestyle relay swimming event at the 2006 Asian Games was held on December 5, 2006 at the Hamad Aquatic Centre in Doha, Qatar.

== Schedule ==
All times are Arabia Standard Time (UTC+03:00)

Date	Time	Event
Tuesday, 5 December 2006	11:36	Heats
Tuesday, 5 December 2006	19:31	Final

== Records ==
Prior to this competition, the existing world, Asian and Games records were as follows.

World Record	United States	3:12.46	Victoria, Canada	19 August 2006
Asian Record	Japan	3:19.20	Montreal, Canada	24 July 2005
Games Record	China	3:21.07	Busan, South Korea	2 October 2002

== Results ==
=== Heats ===
Rank	Heat	Team	Time	Notes
1	2	China (CHN)	3:23.35	
		Qu Jingyu	51.55	
		Cai Li	50.83	
		Chen Zuo	51.07	
		Huang Shaohua	49.90	
2	2	Kazakhstan (KAZ)	3:24.45	
		Stanislav Kuzmin	50.77	
		Alexandr Sklyar	51.30	
		Vyacheslav Titarenko	52.03	
		Vitaliy Khan	50.35	
3	1	Japan (JPN)	3:25.55	
		Yuji Sakurai	51.42	
		Hiroaki Yamamoto	51.62	
		Makoto Ito	51.30	
		Takamitsu Kojima	51.21	
4	2	South Korea (KOR)	3:31.24	
		Chung Yong	54.16	
		Lim Nam-gyun	51.32	
		Sung Min	53.62	
		Han Kyu-chul	52.14	
5	2	Philippines (PHI)	3:31.91	
		Kendrick Uy	52.94	
		Daniel Coakley	54.21	
		James Walsh	53.71	
		Miguel Molina	51.05	
6	1	Uzbekistan (UZB)	3:32.37	
		Petr Vasiliev	53.82	
		Petr Romashkin	52.95	
		Danil Bugakov	52.72	
		Ravil Nachaev	52.88	
7	2	Kuwait (KUW)	3:32.40	
		Mohammad Madwa	52.80	
		Waleed Al-Qahtani	53.24	
		Humoud Al-Humoud	53.16	
		Marzouq Al-Salem	53.20	
8	1	Hong Kong (HKG)	3:33.03	
		Harbeth Fu	53.21	
		Philip Yee	53.65	
		Eric Chan	53.45	
		Macgyver Tse	52.72	
9	1	Iran (IRI)	3:33.09	
		Emin Noshadi	53.65	
		Mohammad Bidarian	52.35	
		Pasha Vahdati	53.73	
		Soheil Maleka Ashtiani	53.36	
10	1	Chinese Taipei (TPE)	3:35.76	
		Chen Te-tung	55.37	
		Tsai Kuo-chuan	53.87	
		Yuan Ping	53.67	
		Wang Shao-an	52.85	
11	1	India (IND)	3:35.94	
		Virdhawal Khade	52.39	
		Rehan Poncha	55.63	
		Arjun Muralidharan	55.23	
		Ankur Poseria	52.69	
12	2	Macau (MAC)	3:39.52	
		Victor Wong	53.80	
		Tang Chon Kit	56.31	
		Antonio Tong	56.62	
		Lao Kuan Fong	52.79	
13	2	Kyrgyzstan (KGZ)	3:40.22	
		Vasilii Danilov	52.77	
		Pavel Kuleshov	57.78	
		Rashid Iunusov	56.07	
		Iurii Zakharov	53.60	
14	2	Qatar (QAT)	3:43.28	
		Moyssara El-Aarag	55.30	
		Anas Abu Yousuf	55.05	
		Osama El-Aarag	55.99	
		Ahmed Salamoun	56.94	
15	1	Palestine (PLE)	4:07.17	
		Fadi Awesat	59.56	
		Wasseim Surey	1:01.77	
		Ahmed Al-Demery	1:04.45	
		Issam Halawani	1:01.39	

=== Final ===
Rank	Team	Time	Notes
1st place, gold medalist(s)	Japan (JPN)	3:18.95	AR
	Takamitsu Kojima	50.43	
	Hiroaki Yamamoto	50.24	
	Makoto Ito	49.33	
	Daisuke Hosokawa	48.95	
2nd place, silver medalist(s)	China (CHN)	3:19.26	
	Huang Shaohua	50.53	
	Chen Zuo	48.73	
	Cai Li	49.73	
	Qu Jingyu	50.27	
3rd place, bronze medalist(s)	South Korea (KOR)	3:22.16	
	Han Kyu-chul	51.07	
	Sung Min	51.07	
	Lim Nam-gyun	50.34	
	Park Tae-hwan	49.68	
4	Kazakhstan (KAZ)	3:23.09	
	Stanislav Kuzmin	50.87	
	Alexandr Sklyar	51.02	
	Vyacheslav Titarenko	51.41	
	Vitaliy Khan	49.79	
5	Uzbekistan (UZB)	3:28.89	
	Ravil Nachaev	52.54	
	Petr Romashkin	51.84	
	Petr Vasiliev	52.80	
	Danil Bugakov	51.71	
6	Philippines (PHI)	3:31.00	
	Miguel Molina	51.66	
	Daniel Coakley	54.00	
	James Walsh	53.03	
	Kendrick Uy	52.31	
7	Kuwait (KUW)	3:32.98	
	Mohammad Madwa	52.97	
	Waleed Al-Qahtani	53.05	
	Humoud Al-Humoud	52.83	
	Marzouq Al-Salem	54.13	
8	Hong Kong (HKG)	3:34.41	
	Harbeth Fu	53.29	
	Philip Yee	53.92	
	Eric Chan	53.41	
	Macgyver Tse	53.79	
