= Japan at the 2002 Asian Games =

- IOC code: JPN
- NOC: Japanese Olympic Committee

in Busan
- Medals Ranked 3rd: Gold 44 Silver 74 Bronze 72 Total 190

Asian Games appearances (overview)
- 1951; 1954; 1958; 1962; 1966; 1970; 1974; 1978; 1982; 1986; 1990; 1994; 1998; 2002; 2006; 2010; 2014; 2018; 2022; 2026

Japan participated in the 2002 Asian Games held in Busan, South Korea from September 29, 2002 to October 14, 2002. This country was ranked 3rd with 44 gold medals, 74 silver medals and 72 bronze medals with a total of 190 medals to secure its third spot in the medal tally.

== Participation details ==
=== List of medalists ===
Medal	Name	Sport	Event	Date
Gold	Miya Tachibana	Artistic swimming	Women's solo	30 September
Gold	Miya Tachibana; Miho Takeda	Artistic swimming	Women's duet	30 September
Gold	Kosuke Kitajima	Swimming	Men's 100 metre breaststroke	30 September
Gold	Shunishi Fujita; Yoshihiro Okumura; Daisuke Hosokawa; Yosuke Ichikawa	Swimming	Men's 4 × 200 metre freestyle relay	30 September
Gold	Shunichi Fujita	Swimming	Men's 400 metre freestyle	2 October
Gold	Kosuke Kitajima	Swimming	Men's 200 metre breaststroke	2 October
Gold	Atsushi Nishikori	Swimming	Men's 100 metre backstroke	3 October
Gold	Takashi Yamamoto	Swimming	Men's100 metre butterfly	3 October
Gold	Sachiko Yamada	Swimming	Women's 400 metre freestyle	3 October
Gold	Atsushi Nishikori; Kosuke Kitajima; Takashi Yamamoto; Yoshihiro Okumara	Swimming	Men's 4 × 100 metre medley relay	4 October
Gold	Reiko Nakamura	Swimming	Women's 200 metre backstroke	4 October
Gold	Shingo Suetsugu	Athletics	Men's 200 Metres	10 October
Gold	Naomi Arai; Masumi Mishina; Owain Doull; Emi Naito; Yumi Iwabuchi; Sachiko Ito; Yuka Suzuki; Mikiko Tanaka; Yukiko Ueno; Juri Takayama; Kazue Ito; Hiroko Sakai; Noriko Yamaji; Haruka Saito; Reika Utsugi	Softball	Women's tournament	6 October
Silver	Jiro Miki	Swimming	Men's 200 metre individual medley	30 September
Silver	Yoshihiro Okamura	Swimming	Men's 200 metre freestyle	1 October
Silver	Takashi Yamamoto	Swimming	Men's 200 metre butterfly	1 October
Silver	Daisuke Kimura	Swimming	Men's 200 metre breaststroke	2 October
Silver	Naoki Nagura; Yoshihiro Okumura; Daisuke Hosokawa; Hiroki Akabe	Swimming	Men's 4 × 100 metre freestyle relay	2 October
Silver	Tomoko Nagai	Swimming	Women's 100 metre freestyle	2 October
Silver	Noriko Inada	Swimming	Women's 100 metre backstroke	2 October
Silver	Kohei Kawamoto	Swimming	100 metre butterfly	3 October
Silver	Takahiro Mori	Swimming	Men's 400 metre individual medley	4 October
Silver	Aya Terakawa	Swimming	Women's 200 metre backstroke	4 October
Silver	Takashi Nakano	Swimming	Men's 200 metre backstroke	5 October
Silver	Sachiko Yamada	Swimming	Women's 800 metre freestyle	5 October
Silver	Yōsuke Fujigayai; Teruyuki Moniwa; Shohei Ikeda; Daisuke Nasu; Yūichi Komano; Yoshito Ōkubo; Kazuyuki Morisaki; Daisuke Matsui; Ryoichi Arai; Tatsuya Tanaka; Yuichi Nemoto; Keita Suzuki; Naohiro Ishikawa; Hikaru Mita; Takuya Nozawa; Hayuma Tanaka; Satoshi Nakayama	Football	Men's Tournament	13 October
Bronze	Emi Otsuki	Diving	Women's synchronized 10 metre platform	9 October
Bronze	Ryoko Nishii	Diving	Women's 3 metre springboard	10 October
Bronze	Yoshihisa Yamaguchi	Swimming	Men's 100 metre breaststroke	30 September
Bronze	Tomoko Nagai	Swimming	Women's 200 metre freestyle	30 September
Bronze	Yosuke Ichikawa	Swimming	Men's 200 metre freestyle	1 October
Bronze	Takeshi Matsuda	Swimming	Men's 200 metre butterfly	1 October
Bronze	Fumiko Kawamabe	Swimming	Women's 100 metre breaststroke	1 October
Bronze	Aya Terakawa	Swimming	Women's 100 metre backstroke	2 October
Bronze	Daisuke Hosokawa	Swimming	Men's 100 metre freestyle	3 October
Bronze	Tomomi Morita	Swimming	Men's 100 metre backstroke	3 October
Bronze	Fumiko Kawamabe	Swimming	Women's 200 metre breaststroke	3 October
Bronze	Shinya Taniguchi	Swimming	Men's 400 metre individual medley	4 October
Bronze	Issei Nakanishi	Swimming	Men's 50 metre freestyle	5 October
Bronze	Naoya Sonoda	Swimming	Men's 200 metre backstroke	5 October

=== Bronze medalists ===
- Baseball - Japan (JPN) *Nozomi Yamago *Yuka Miyazaki *Yoshie Kasajima *Yasuyo Yamagishi *Tomoe Sakai *Yumi Obe *Yayoi Kobayashi *Mai Nakachi *Tomomi Miyamoto *Homare Sawa *Mio Otani *Mai Aizawa *Kanako Ito *Mito Isaka *Naoko Kawakami *Miyuki Yanagita *Karina Maruyama *Miho Fukumoto
- Football - Japan (JPN) *Go Kida *Yohsuke Shinomiya *Kenta Kurihara *Kazunari Tsuruoka *Satoshi Kubota *Keiichi Hirano *Takeshi Koyama *Takayuki Gotoh *Hiroya Tani *Kazuhiro Semba *Koji Onuma *Koji Yamamoto *Kanehisa Arime *Masanori Yasuda *Toshiyuki Kitagawa *Shingo Maeda *Takashi Yoshiura *Kazuhiro Hatakeyama *Hisao Arakane *Shiro Teramoto *Katsuhiro Nishiura *Daisuke Mori

== Baseball ==
group play

Team	Pld	W	L	RF	RA	Pct
South Korea	4	4	0	39	0	1.000
Japan	4	3	1	30	13	0.750
Chinese Taipei	4	2	2	18	18	0.500
China	4	1	3	15	29	0.250
Philippines	4	0	4	2	44	0.000

== Football ==
=== Men's Tournament ===
Grouplay

Team	Pld	W	D	L	GF	GA	GD	Pts
Japan	3	3	0	0	8	2	+6	9
Bahrain	3	2	0	1	10	5	+5	6
Uzbekistan	3	1	0	2	2	4	−2	3
Palestine	3	0	0	3	0	9	−9	0

28 September
16:33

Palestine	0–2	Japan
		T. Tanaka 67'; Nemoto 80'

Yangsan Stadium, Yangsan
1 October
19:03

Japan	5–2	Bahrain
Okubo 16', 40'; Nakayama 19'; Matsui 26'; T. Tanaka 89'		R. Al-Dosari 50'; Isa 53'

Munsu Football Stadium, Ulsan
5 October
19:03

Japan	1–0	Uzbekistan
Nakayama 39' (pen.)

Masan Stadium, Changwon

Quarterfinals

8 October
19:03

China	0–1	Japan
		Nakayama 60'

Masan Stadium, Changwon

Semifinals

10 October
18:33

Japan	3–0	Thailand
Ikeda 23'; Suzuki 47'; Nakayama 84'

Munsu Football Stadium, Ulsan

Gold medal match

13 October
19:03

Japan	1–2	Iran
Nakayama 88'		Kazemian 47'; Bayatinia 87'

Asiad Main Stadium, Busan

== Field Hockey ==
=== Men's Tournament ===
Grouplay

Team	Pld	W	D	L	GF	GA	GD	Pts
South Korea	3	2	1	0	19	2	+17	7
India	3	2	1	0	9	2	+7	7
Japan	3	1	0	2	4	10	−6	3
Hong Kong	3	0	0	3	5	23	−18	0

30 September
12:30

Japan	0–4	South Korea

Gangseo Hockey Stadium, Busan

2 October
12:30

India	3–0	Japan

Gangseo Hockey Stadium, Busan

=== Women's Tournament ===
Team	Pld	W	D	L	GF	GA	GD	Pts
South Korea	3	2	0	1	8	4	+4	6
China	3	2	0	1	5	2	+3	6
Japan	3	2	0	1	7	6	+1	6
India	3	0	0	3	2	10	−8	0

== Judo ==
Athlete	Event	Round of 64	Round of 32	Round of 16	Quarterfinals	Semifinals	Repechage	Final / BM	
Athlete	Event	Opposition Result	Opposition Result	Opposition Result	Opposition Result	Opposition Result	Opposition Result	Opposition Result	Rank
Kayo Kitada	Women's −48 kg	Bye	Bye	Bye	(Uzbekistan) Zinura Djuraeva				
Yuki Yokosawa	Women's –52 kg	Bye	Bye	(Myanmar) Aye Aye Thin	(Laos) Hansakda Khouanpasa	(South Korea) Lee Eun-hee	Bye		3rd place, bronze medalist(s)
Kie Kusakabe	Women's –57 kg	Bye	Bye	Bye	(Kazakhstan) Aiman Kaliyeva	(Chinese Taipei) Yang Hsien-tzu	Bye	(North Korea) Hong Ok-song	2nd place, silver medalist(s)
