= Swimming at the 1998 Asian Games – Men's 200 metre freestyle =

Men's 200 metre freestyle at the 1998 Asian Games
- Venue: Thammasat Aquatic Center
- Date: 7 December 1998
- Competitors: 27 from 17 nations

Medalists
gold medal	Yosuke Ichikawa	Japan
silver medal	Torlarp Sethsothorn	Thailand
bronze medal	Shusuke Ito	Japan

The men's 200 metre freestyle swimming competition at the 1998 Asian Games in Bangkok was held on 7 December at the Thammasat Aquatic Center.

== Schedule ==
All times are Indochina Time (UTC+07:00)

Date	Time	Event
Monday, 7 December 1998	09:00	Heats
Monday, 7 December 1998	18:00	Finals

== Results ==
Legend

- DNS — Did not start

=== Heats ===
Rank	Heat	Athlete	Time	Notes
1	4	Torlarp Sethsothorn (THA)	1:52.77	
2	4	Wang Chuan (CHN)	1:52.97	
3	2	Kim Bang-hyun (KOR)	1:53.69	
4	4	Mark Chay (SIN)	1:54.36	
5	4	Yosuke Ichikawa (JPN)	1:54.49	
6	2	Koh Yun-ho (KOR)	1:54.50	
7	3	Sng Ju Wei (SIN)	1:54.53	
8	3	Shusuke Ito (JPN)	1:54.91	
9	2	Vicha Ratanachote (THA)	1:54.99	
10	2	Du Jie (CHN)	1:55.02	
11	3	Andrey Kvassov (KAZ)	1:55.54	
12	3	Oleg Tsvetkovskiy (UZB)	1:55.77	
13	4	Zachary Moffatt (HKG)	1:56.38	
14	4	Carlo Piccio (PHI)	1:58.22	
15	1	Wu Nien-pin (TPE)	1:58.40	
16	3	Petr Vasiliev (UZB)	1:58.57	
17	3	Tang Chon Kit (MAC)	1:59.15	
18	4	Sun Fat Yee (HKG)	1:59.43	
19	1	Chen Yi-chung (TPE)	2:00.35	
20	2	Fahad Al-Otaibi (KUW)	2:03.31	
21	2	Hamed Rezakhani (IRI)	2:04.48	
22	1	Farshid Karami (IRI)	2:09.34	
23	3	Ibrahim Shafee (UAE)	2:12.41	
24	4	Hem Kiry (CAM)	2:13.27	
25	3	Ammar Al-Ejji (QAT)	2:16.42	
—	2	Kamal Masud (PAK)	DNS	
—	2	Mumtaz Ahmed (PAK)	DNS	

=== Finals ===
==== Final B ====
Rank	Athlete	Time	Notes
1	Vicha Ratanachote (THA)	1:54.52	
2	Andrey Kvassov (KAZ)	1:54.69	
3	Oleg Tsvetkovskiy (UZB)	1:55.69	
4	Zachary Moffatt (HKG)	1:56.53	
5	Du Jie (CHN)	1:57.12	
6	Petr Vasiliev (UZB)	1:58.63	
7	Wu Nien-pin (TPE)	1:58.80	
8	Carlo Piccio (PHI)	1:59.93	

==== Final A ====
Rank	Athlete	Time	Notes
1st place, gold medalist(s)	Yosuke Ichikawa (JPN)	1:52.46	
2nd place, silver medalist(s)	Torlarp Sethsothorn (THA)	1:52.53	
3rd place, bronze medalist(s)	Shusuke Ito (JPN)	1:52.81	
4	Kim Bang-hyun (KOR)	1:53.04	
5	Wang Chuan (CHN)	1:53.16	
6	Koh Yun-ho (KOR)	1:53.82	
7	Mark Chay (SIN)	1:54.57	
8	Sng Ju Wei (SIN)	1:55.26	
