= Swimming at the 2002 Asian Games – Men's 200 metre freestyle =

Men's 200 metre freestyle at the 2002 Asian Games
- Venue: Sajik Swimming Pool
- Date: 1 October 2002
- Competitors: 21 from 16 nations

Medalists
gold medal	Liu Yu	China
silver medal	Yoshihiro Okumura	Japan
bronze medal	Yosuke Ichikawa	Japan

The men's 200 metre freestyle swimming competition at the 2002 Asian Games in Busan was held on 3 October at the Sajik Swimming Pool.

== Schedule ==
All times are Korea Standard Time (UTC+09:00)

Date	Time	Event
Tuesday, 1 October 2002	10:00	Heats
Tuesday, 1 October 2002	19:00	Finals

== Records ==
Prior to this competition, the existing world, Asian and Games records were as follows.

World Record	Ian Thorpe (AUS)	1:44.06	Fukuoka, Japan	25 July 2001
Asian Record	Yoshihiro Okumura (JPN)	1:49.23	Tokyo, Japan	28 August 2001
Games Record	Shunichi Fujita (JPN)	1:50.14	Busan, South Korea	30 September 2002

== Results ==
Legend

- DNS — Did not start

=== Heats ===
Rank	Heat	Athlete	Time	Notes
1	1	Yoshihiro Okumura (JPN)	1:50.48	
2	1	Koh Yun-ho (KOR)	1:52.58	
3	3	Yosuke Ichikawa (JPN)	1:52.93	
4	2	Liu Yu (CHN)	1:53.49	
5	3	Miguel Molina (PHI)	1:53.51	
6	3	Gary Tan (SIN)	1:53.84	
7	2	Yu Cheng (CHN)	1:53.88	
8	3	Han Kyu-chul (KOR)	1:54.18	
9	3	Mark Kwok (HKG)	1:54.22	Withdrew
10	2	Wu Nien-pin (TPE)	1:54.32	
11	1	Mark Chay (SIN)	1:54.44	
12	1	Petr Vasiliev (UZB)	1:55.86	
13	2	Dulyarit Phuangthong (THA)	1:58.17	
14	2	Naeem Al-Masri (SYR)	1:58.33	
15	3	Fung Hok Him (HKG)	1:58.78	
16	1	Wong Tuck Kar (MAS)	2:02.02	Withdrew
17	1	Anas Abu Yousuf (QAT)	2:08.13	Advanced
18	3	Omar Daaboul (LIB)	2:09.26	Advanced
19	2	Muhammad Khan (PAK)	2:09.93	
20	1	Imran Abdul Rahman (MDV)	2:33.65	
—	2	Maher Al-Motar (KSA)	DNS	

=== Finals ===
==== Final B ====
Rank	Athlete	Time	Notes
1	Wu Nien-pin (TPE)	1:53.60	
2	Petr Vasiliev (UZB)	1:55.85	
3	Mark Chay (SIN)	1:55.93	
4	Dulyarit Phuangthong (THA)	1:56.33	
5	Naeem Al-Masri (SYR)	1:57.87	
6	Fung Hok Him (HKG)	1:58.37	
7	Anas Abu Yousuf (QAT)	2:05.58	
8	Omar Daaboul (LIB)	2:08.87	

==== Final A ====
Rank	Athlete	Time	Notes
1st place, gold medalist(s)	Liu Yu (CHN)	1:49.29	GR
2nd place, silver medalist(s)	Yoshihiro Okumura (JPN)	1:49.36	
3rd place, bronze medalist(s)	Yosuke Ichikawa (JPN)	1:50.66	
4	Han Kyu-chul (KOR)	1:50.97	
5	Miguel Molina (PHI)	1:52.99	
6	Koh Yun-ho (KOR)	1:53.24	
7	Yu Cheng (CHN)	1:53.91	
8	Gary Tan (SIN)	1:54.25	
