= Swimming at the 2002 Asian Games – Men's 200 metre individual medley =

Men's 200 metre individual medley at the 2002 Asian Games
- Venue: Sajik Swimming Pool
- Date: 30 September 2002
- Competitors: 20 from 15 nations

Medalists
gold medal	Takahiro Mori	Japan
silver medal	Jiro Miki	Japan
bronze medal	Ouyang Kunpeng	China

The men's 200 metre individual medley swimming competition at the 2002 Asian Games in Busan was held on 30 September at the Sajik Swimming Pool.

== Schedule ==
All times are Korea Standard Time (UTC+09:00)

Date	Time	Event
Monday, 30 September 2002	10:00	Heats
Monday, 30 September 2002	19:00	Finals

== Records ==
Prior to this competition, the existing world, Asian and Games records were as follows.

World Record	Jani Sievinen (FIN)	1:58.16	Rome, Italy	11 September 1994
Asian Record	Takahiro Mori (JPN)	2:00.61	Yokohama, Japan	29 August 2002
Games Record	Xiong Guoming (CHN)	2:03.34	Bangkok, Thailand	12 December 1998

== Results ==
Legend

- DNS — Did not start

=== Heats ===
Rank	Heat	Athlete	Time	Notes
1	2	Takahiro Mori (JPN)	2:03.03	GR
2	3	Ouyang Kunpeng (CHN)	2:03.79	
3	3	Jiro Miki (JPN)	2:04.27	
4	1	Xie Xufeng (CHN)	2:05.19	
5	1	Miguel Molina (PHI)	2:05.97	
6	1	Kim Bang-hyun (KOR)	2:06.64	
7	2	Ratapong Sirisanont (THA)	2:06.74	
8	1	Gary Tan (SIN)	2:07.09	
9	2	Wu Nien-pin (TPE)	2:07.65	
10	2	Kim Sung-tae (KOR)	2:07.73	
11	3	Mark Kwok (HKG)	2:08.21	
12	3	Gerald Koh (SIN)	2:08.53	
13	2	Oleg Pukhnatiy (UZB)	2:09.33	
14	3	Dulyarit Phuangthong (THA)	2:11.76	
15	1	Mohammed Al-Yousef (KSA)	2:14.65	
16	3	Rehan Poncha (IND)	2:14.80	
17	3	Rubel Rana (BAN)	2:19.51	
18	2	Anas Abu Yousuf (QAT)	2:23.32	
19	1	Zulfiqar Ali (PAK)	2:23.87	
20	2	François Ghattas (LIB)	2:28.60	

=== Finals ===
==== Final B ====
Rank	Athlete	Time	Notes
1	Wu Nien-pin (TPE)	2:06.24	
2	Kim Sung-tae (KOR)	2:08.35	
3	Gerald Koh (SIN)	2:09.25	
4	Oleg Pukhnatiy (UZB)	2:10.10	
5	Dulyarit Phuangthong (THA)	2:11.42	
6	Rehan Poncha (IND)	2:14.17	
—	Mohammed Al-Yousef (KSA)	DNS	
—	Mark Kwok (HKG)	DNS	

==== Final A ====
Rank	Athlete	Time	Notes
1st place, gold medalist(s)	Takahiro Mori (JPN)	2:00.53	AR
2nd place, silver medalist(s)	Jiro Miki (JPN)	2:02.07	
3rd place, bronze medalist(s)	Ouyang Kunpeng (CHN)	2:03.34	
4	Kim Bang-hyun (KOR)	2:05.12	
5	Ratapong Sirisanont (THA)	2:05.18	
6	Miguel Molina (PHI)	2:06.45	
7	Xie Xufeng (CHN)	2:06.81	
8	Gary Tan (SIN)	2:07.22	
