= Swimming at the 2002 Asian Games – Men's 1500 metre freestyle =

Men's 1500 metre freestyle at the 2002 Asian Games
- Venue: Sajik Swimming Pool
- Date: 4 October 2002
- Competitors: 12 from 7 nations

Medalists
gold medal	Yu Cheng	China
silver medal	Cho Sung-mo	South Korea
bronze medal	Han Kyu-chul	South Korea

The men's 1500 metre freestyle swimming competition at the 2002 Asian Games in Busan was held on 4 October at the Sajik Swimming Pool. This was a timed-final event, meaning that each swimmer only swam once, with the fastest eight (8) entrants swimming in the finals.

== Schedule ==
All times are Korea Standard Time (UTC+09:00)

Date	Time	Event
Friday, 4 October 2002	10:00	Final 1
Friday, 4 October 2002	19:00	Final 2

== Records ==
Prior to this competition, the existing world, Asian and Games records were as follows.

World Record	Grant Hackett (AUS)	14:34.56	Fukuoka, Japan	29 July 2001
Asian Record	Masato Hirano (JPN)	15:14.43	Sydney, Australia	22 September 2000
Games Record	Masato Hirano (JPN)	15:22.20	Bangkok, Thailand	6 December 1998

== Results ==
Legend

- DNS — Did not start

Rank	Heat	Athlete	Time	Notes
1st place, gold medalist(s)	2	Yu Cheng (CHN)	15:10.99	AR
2nd place, silver medalist(s)	2	Cho Sung-mo (KOR)	15:12.32	
3rd place, bronze medalist(s)	2	Han Kyu-chul (KOR)	15:22.38	
4	2	Shunichi Fujita (JPN)	15:24.64	
5	2	Zheng Shibin (CHN)	15:46.13	
6	2	Miguel Mendoza (PHI)	15:46.40	
7	2	Takeshi Matsuda (JPN)	15:57.29	
8	1	Chung Kwok Leung (HKG)	16:05.79	
9	1	Naeem Al-Masri (SYR)	16:37.91	
10	1	Anas Abu Yousuf (QAT)	17:41.59	
11	1	Ahmed Salamoun (QAT)	19:12.90	
—	2	Carlo Piccio (PHI)	DNS	
