= Kim Min-suk (swimmer) =

South Korean swimmer (born 1979)

Personal information
- Full name: Kim Min-suk
- National team: South Korea
- Born: 3 February 1979 (age 47) Seoul, South Korea
- Height: 1.82 m (6 ft 0 in)
- Weight: 75 kg (165 lb)

Korean name
- Hangul: 김민석
- RR: Gim Minseok
- MR: Kim Minsŏk

Sport
- Sport: Swimming
- Strokes: Freestyle, backstroke
- Club: Hanjin Heavy Industries
- College team: Dong-a University
Medal record
Men's swimming
Representing South Korea
Swimming at the Asian Games
Gold medal – first place	2002 Busan	50 m freestyle
Bronze medal – third place	2002 Busan	4×100 m freestyle

Kim Min-suk (Korean: 김민석; born 3 February 1979) is a retired South Korean swimmer, who specialized in sprint freestyle and backstroke events. He is a two-time Olympian (1996 and 2000), and a double medalist at the 2002 Asian Games in Busan.

Kim made his official debut, as a 17-year-old, at the 1996 Summer Olympics in Atlanta. He failed to reach the top 16 final in the 100 m backstroke, finishing in thirty-ninth place with a time of 58.43. He also placed fifteenth as a member of the South Korean team in the 4×200 m freestyle relay (7:45.98), and seventeenth in the 4×100 m medley relay (3:50.84).

At the 2000 Summer Olympics in Sydney, Kim decided to experiment with the sprint freestyle, competing only in two swimming events. He posted FINA B-standards of 22.99 (50 m freestyle) and 51.14 (100 m freestyle) from the Dong-A Swimming Tournament in Ulsan. In the 100 m freestyle, Kim placed twenty-fourth on the morning's prelims. Swimming in heat six, he picked up a second spot by 0.21 of a second behind winner Peter Mankoč of Slovenia in a lifetime best of 50.49. Two days later, in the 50 m freestyle, Kim missed the semifinals by a small fraction of 0.02 seconds, finishing a tie with China's Jiang Chengji in a South Korean record of 22.82.

When his nation hosted the 2002 Asian Games in Busan, Kim won a total of two medals, one gold and one bronze. In the 50 m freestyle, Kim was delighted and overwhelmed by the home crowd, as he shared a gold medal with Uzbekistan's Ravil Nachaev in a matching time of 22.86, just 0.04 seconds outside his record from Sydney two years before. He also captured a bronze, along with his teammates Sung Min, Han Kyu-Chul, and Ko Yun-Ho, in the 4×100 m freestyle relay (3:23.58).
