= Swimming at the 2006 Asian Games – Men's 400 metre individual medley =

Men's 400 metre individual medley at the 2006 Asian Games
- Venue: Hamad Aquatic Centre
- Date: 2 December 2006
- Competitors: 17 from 12 nations

Medalists
gold medal	Hidemasa Sano	Japan
silver medal	Shinya Taniguchi	Japan
bronze medal	Han Kyu-chul	South Korea

The Men's 400m Individual Medley swimming event at the 2006 Asian Games was held on December 2, 2006 at the Hamad Aquatic Centre in Doha, Qatar.

== Schedule ==
All times are Arabia Standard Time (UTC+03:00)

Date	Time	Event
Saturday, 2 December 2006	10:52	Heats
Saturday, 2 December 2006	18:43	Final

== Records ==
Prior to this competition, the existing world, Asian and Games records were as follows.

World Record	Michael Phelps (USA)	4:08.26	Athens, Greece	14 August 2004
Asian Record	Jiro Miki (JPN)	4:14.79	Tokyo, Japan	20 April 2004
Games Record	Wu Peng (CHN)	4:15.38	Busan, South Korea	4 October 2002

== Results ==
=== Heats ===
Rank	Heat	Athlete	Time	Notes
1	3	Hidemasa Sano (JPN)	4:25.21	
2	2	Shinya Taniguchi (JPN)	4:25.62	
3	1	Han Kyu-chul (KOR)	4:27.33	
4	1	Miguel Molina (PHI)	4:28.99	
5	1	Dmitriy Gordiyenko (KAZ)	4:32.98	
6	3	Park Beom-ho (KOR)	4:34.08	
7	3	Vasilii Danilov (KGZ)	4:34.79	
8	2	Lim Zhi Cong (SIN)	4:35.27	
9	1	Iurii Zakharov (KGZ)	4:38.99	
10	3	Tsai Kuo-chuan (TPE)	4:39.95	
11	3	Rehan Poncha (IND)	4:40.69	
12	2	Kevin Chu (HKG)	4:41.23	
13	2	Lin Yu-an (TPE)	4:42.11	
14	1	Shahin Baradaran (IRI)	4:43.61	
15	2	Abdulrahman Al-Bader (KUW)	4:44.14	
16	3	Saeid Maleka Ashtiani (IRI)	4:45.13	
17	2	Lei Hong Nam (MAC)	5:08.93	

=== Final ===
Rank	Athlete	Time	Notes
1st place, gold medalist(s)	Hidemasa Sano (JPN)	4:16.18	
2nd place, silver medalist(s)	Shinya Taniguchi (JPN)	4:17.91	
3rd place, bronze medalist(s)	Han Kyu-chul (KOR)	4:21.78	
4	Miguel Molina (PHI)	4:28.44	
5	Park Beom-ho (KOR)	4:29.47	
6	Dmitriy Gordiyenko (KAZ)	4:29.77	
7	Lim Zhi Cong (SIN)	4:35.56	
8	Vasilii Danilov (KGZ)	4:35.81	
