= Swimming at the 2002 Asian Games – Men's 100 metre backstroke =

Men's 100 metre backstroke at the 2002 Asian Games
- Venue: Sajik Swimming Pool
- Date: 3 October 2002
- Competitors: 15 from 12 nations

Medalists
gold medal	Atsushi Nishikori	Japan
silver medal	Alex Lim	Malaysia
bronze medal	Tomomi Morita	Japan

The men's 100 metre backstroke swimming competition at the 2002 Asian Games in Busan was held on 3 October at the Sajik Swimming Pool.

== Schedule ==
All times are Korea Standard Time (UTC+09:00)

Date	Time	Event
Thursday, 3 October 2002	10:00	Heats
Thursday, 3 October 2002	19:00	Final

== Records ==
Prior to this competition, the existing world, Asian and Games records were as follows.

World Record	Lenny Krayzelburg (USA)	53.60	Sydney, Australia	24 August 1999
Asian Record	Daichi Suzuki (JPN)	55.05	Seoul, South Korea	24 September 1988
Games Record	Alex Lim (MAS)	55.53	Bangkok, Thailand	11 December 1998

== Results ==
=== Heats ===
Rank	Heat	Athlete	Time	Notes
1	1	Atsushi Nishikori (JPN)	55.06	GR
2	1	Tomomi Morita (JPN)	56.16	
3	2	Alex Lim (MAS)	56.70	
4	2	Ouyang Kunpeng (CHN)	56.84	
5	1	Yu Rui (CHN)	57.96	
6	2	Sung Min (KOR)	57.98	
7	2	Gerald Koh (SIN)	59.30	
8	2	Dulyarit Phuangthong (THA)	59.66	
9	1	Alex Fong (HKG)	1:00.49	
10	1	Dickson Fai (HKG)	1:00.57	
11	2	Akbar Ali Mir (IND)	1:01.74	
12	2	Albert Galyautdinov (UZB)	1:02.31	
13	1	Rubel Rana (BAN)	1:03.14	
14	2	Ganboldyn Urnultsaikhan (MGL)	1:09.03	
15	1	Rashid Al-Mohannadi (QAT)	1:09.84	

=== Final ===
Rank	Athlete	Time	Notes
1st place, gold medalist(s)	Atsushi Nishikori (JPN)	55.17	
2nd place, silver medalist(s)	Alex Lim (MAS)	55.18	
3rd place, bronze medalist(s)	Tomomi Morita (JPN)	55.32	
4	Ouyang Kunpeng (CHN)	55.61	
5	Sung Min (KOR)	56.23	
6	Yu Rui (CHN)	56.29	
7	Dulyarit Phuangthong (THA)	59.04	
8	Gerald Koh (SIN)	59.41	
