= Swimming at the 2002 Asian Games – Men's 200 metre backstroke =

Swimming Competition

Men's 200 metre backstroke at the 2002 Asian Games
- Venue: Sajik Swimming Pool
- Date: 5 October 2002
- Competitors: 11 from 9 nations

Medalists
gold medal	Wu Peng	China
silver medal	Takashi Nakano	Japan
bronze medal	Naoya Sonoda	Japan

The men's 200 metre backstroke swimming competition at the 2002 Asian Games in Busan was held on 5 October at the Sajik Swimming Pool.

== Schedule ==
All times are Korea Standard Time (UTC+09:00)

Date	Time	Event
Saturday, 5 October 2002	10:00	Heats
Saturday, 5 October 2002	19:00	Final

== Records ==
Prior to this competition, the existing world, Asian and Games records were as follows.

World Record	Aaron Peirsol (USA)	1:55.15	Minneapolis, United States	20 March 2002
Asian Record	Fu Yong (CHN)	1:58.72	Shanghai, China	19 October 1997
Games Record	Fu Yong (CHN)	1:59.30	Bangkok, Thailand	7 December 1998

== Results ==
Legend

- DNS — Did not start

=== Heats ===
Rank	Heat	Athlete	Time	Notes
1	2	Takashi Nakano (JPN)	2:01.28	
2	2	Naoya Sonoda (JPN)	2:04.83	
3	1	Sung Min (KOR)	2:07.61	
4	2	Wu Peng (CHN)	2:09.57	
5	1	Alex Lim (MAS)	2:09.82	
6	1	Yu Rui (CHN)	2:09.88	
7	2	Dickson Fai (HKG)	2:10.10	
8	2	Gerald Koh (SIN)	2:19.25	
9	2	Rashid Al-Mohannadi (QAT)	2:32.86	
—	1	Maher Al-Motar (KSA)	DNS	
—	1	François Ghattas (LIB)	DNS	

=== Final ===
Rank	Athlete	Time	Notes
1st place, gold medalist(s)	Wu Peng (CHN)	2:00.40	
2nd place, silver medalist(s)	Takashi Nakano (JPN)	2:00.76	
3rd place, bronze medalist(s)	Naoya Sonoda (JPN)	2:01.22	
4	Yu Rui (CHN)	2:01.28	
5	Alex Lim (MAS)	2:01.97	
6	Sung Min (KOR)	2:03.23	
7	Gerald Koh (SIN)	2:08.51	
8	Dickson Fai (HKG)	2:11.39	
