= Swimming at the 2002 Asian Games – Men's 200 metre butterfly =

Men's 200 metre butterfly at the 2002 Asian Games
- Venue: Sajik Swimming Pool
- Date: 1 October 2002
- Competitors: 15 from 10 nations

Medalists
gold medal	Wu Peng	China
silver medal	Takashi Yamamoto	Japan
bronze medal	Takeshi Matsuda	Japan

The men's 200 metre butterfly swimming competition at the 2002 Asian Games in Busan was held on 1 October at the Sajik Swimming Pool.

== Schedule ==
All times are Korea Standard Time (UTC+09:00)

Date	Time	Event
Tuesday, 1 October 2002	10:00	Heats
Tuesday, 1 October 2002	19:00	Final

== Records ==
Prior to this competition, the existing world, Asian and Games records were as follows.

World Record	Michael Phelps (USA)	1:54.58	Fukuoka, Japan	24 July 2001
Asian Record	Takashi Yamamoto (JPN)	1:55.57	Yokohama, Japan	27 August 2002
Games Record	Takashi Yamamoto (JPN)	1:56.75	Bangkok, Thailand	11 December 1998

== Results ==
Legend

- DNS — Did not start

=== Heats ===
Rank	Heat	Athlete	Time	Notes
1	2	Takashi Yamamoto (JPN)	2:00.02	
2	1	Takeshi Matsuda (JPN)	2:00.36	
3	2	Wu Peng (CHN)	2:01.85	
4	2	Yoo Jung-nam (KOR)	2:02.00	
5	2	Cho Jae-hyun (KOR)	2:02.44	
6	1	Jin Hao (CHN)	2:02.51	
7	1	Tseng Cheng-hua (TPE)	2:03.83	
8	1	Mark Kwok (HKG)	2:06.19	
9	2	Charles Szeto (HKG)	2:06.31	
10	2	Mohammed Al-Yousef (KSA)	2:08.84	
11	1	Ng Cheng Xun (SIN)	2:11.04	
12	1	Zulfiqar Ali (PAK)	2:19.67	
13	2	Moyssara El-Aarag (QAT)	2:27.11	
14	2	Rad Aweisat (PLE)	2:37.24	
—	1	Mohammed Al-Hamadi (QAT)	DNS	

=== Final ===
Rank	Athlete	Time	Notes
1st place, gold medalist(s)	Wu Peng (CHN)	1:56.63	GR
2nd place, silver medalist(s)	Takashi Yamamoto (JPN)	1:57.18	
3rd place, bronze medalist(s)	Takeshi Matsuda (JPN)	1:57.26	
4	Jin Hao (CHN)	1:59.54	
5	Yoo Jung-nam (KOR)	2:00.77	
6	Cho Jae-hyun (KOR)	2:02.78	
7	Tseng Cheng-hua (TPE)	2:03.87	
8	Mark Kwok (HKG)	2:03.91	
