= Swimming at the 2002 Asian Games – Men's 400 metre individual medley =

Men's 400 metre individual medley at the 2002 Asian Games
- Venue: Sajik Swimming Pool
- Date: 4 October 2002
- Competitors: 15 from 10 nations

Medalists
gold medal	Wu Peng	China
silver medal	Takahiro Mori	Japan
bronze medal	Shinya Taniguchi	Japan

The men's 400 metre individual medley swimming competition at the 2002 Asian Games in Busan was held on 4 October at the Sajik Swimming Pool.

== Schedule ==
All times are Korea Standard Time (UTC+09:00)

Date	Time	Event
Friday, 4 October 2002	10:00	Heats
Friday, 4 October 2002	19:00	Final

== Records ==
Prior to this competition, the existing world, Asian and Games records were as follows.

World Record	Michael Phelps (USA)	4:11.09	Fort Lauderdale, United States	15 August 2002
Asian Record	Takahiro Mori (JPN)	4:15.41	Yokohama, Japan	25 August 2002
Games Record	Ratapong Sirisanont (THA)	4:20.03	Hiroshima, Japan	4 October 1994

== Results ==
Legend

- DNS — Did not start

=== Heats ===
Rank	Heat	Athlete	Time	Notes
1	2	Takahiro Mori (JPN)	4:24.97	
2	2	Shinya Taniguchi (JPN)	4:25.84	
3	2	Kim Bang-hyun (KOR)	4:30.58	
4	1	Wu Peng (CHN)	4:30.77	
5	1	Carlo Piccio (PHI)	4:31.49	
6	1	Xie Xufeng (CHN)	4:31.64	
7	1	Ratapong Sirisanont (THA)	4:31.73	
8	2	Miguel Molina (PHI)	4:32.78	
9	2	Kim Sung-tae (KOR)	4:44.15	
10	1	Rehan Poncha (IND)	4:49.04	
11	2	Fung Hok Him (HKG)	4:50.71	
12	1	Zulfiqar Ali (PAK)	5:08.76	
—	2	Mohammed Al-Hamadi (QAT)	DNS	
—	1	Omar Daaboul (LIB)	DNS	
—	2	François Ghattas (LIB)	DNS	

=== Final ===
Rank	Athlete	Time	Notes
1st place, gold medalist(s)	Wu Peng (CHN)	4:15.38	AR
2nd place, silver medalist(s)	Takahiro Mori (JPN)	4:16.63	
3rd place, bronze medalist(s)	Shinya Taniguchi (JPN)	4:17.03	
4	Kim Bang-hyun (KOR)	4:27.46	
5	Xie Xufeng (CHN)	4:29.34	
6	Miguel Molina (PHI)	4:31.35	
7	Ratapong Sirisanont (THA)	4:32.30	
8	Carlo Piccio (PHI)	4:33.88	
