= Swimming at the 2006 Asian Games – Men's 200 metre backstroke =

Men's 200 metre backstroke at the 2006 Asian Games
- Venue: Hamad Aquatic Centre
- Date: 4 December 2006
- Competitors: 20 from 14 nations

Medalists
gold medal	Ryosuke Irie	Japan
silver medal	Ouyang Kunpeng	China
bronze medal	Takashi Nakano	Japan

The men's 200m backstroke swimming event at the 2006 Asian Games was held on December 4, 2006 at the Hamad Aquatic Centre in Doha, Qatar.

== Schedule ==
All times are Arabia Standard Time (UTC+03:00)

Date	Time	Event
Monday, 4 December 2006	11:02	Heats
Monday, 4 December 2006	19:10	Final

== Records ==
Prior to this competition, the existing world, Asian and Games records were as follows.

World Record	Aaron Peirsol (USA)	1:54.44	Victoria, Canada	19 August 2006
Asian Record	Takashi Nakano (JPN)	1:57.17	Tokyo, Japan	1 September 2006
Games Record	Fu Yong (CHN)	1:59.30	Bangkok, Thailand	7 December 1998

== Results ==
=== Heats ===
Rank	Heat	Athlete	Time	Notes
1	3	Takashi Nakano (JPN)	2:01.42	
2	1	Ryosuke Irie (JPN)	2:02.27	
3	2	Ouyang Kunpeng (CHN)	2:04.09	
4	2	Sergey Pankov (UZB)	2:05.44	
5	3	Zhang Bodong (CHN)	2:06.19	
6	2	Lee Seung-hyeon (KOR)	2:06.97	
7	1	Geoffrey Cheah (HKG)	2:07.08	
8	1	Oleg Rabota (KAZ)	2:07.55	
9	3	Yuan Ping (TPE)	2:08.67	
10	2	Lin Yu-an (TPE)	2:09.20	
11	1	Danil Bugakov (UZB)	2:10.98	
12	2	Rehan Poncha (IND)	2:11.53	
13	3	Đỗ Huy Long (VIE)	2:13.21	
14	2	Shahin Baradaran (IRI)	2:13.61	
15	1	Antonio Tong (MAC)	2:14.19	
16	3	Aiman Al-Kulaibi (OMA)	2:16.11	
17	3	Chung Kwok Ting (HKG)	2:17.07	
18	1	Heshan Unamboowe (SRI)	2:18.85	
19	3	Cheong Kin Wa (MAC)	2:25.00	
20	2	Amir Adnan (IRQ)	2:47.28	

=== Final ===
Rank	Athlete	Time	Notes
1st place, gold medalist(s)	Ryosuke Irie (JPN)	1:58.85	GR
2nd place, silver medalist(s)	Ouyang Kunpeng (CHN)	1:59.15	
3rd place, bronze medalist(s)	Takashi Nakano (JPN)	1:59.34	
4	Zhang Bodong (CHN)	2:00.84	
5	Lee Seung-hyeon (KOR)	2:05.23	
6	Sergey Pankov (UZB)	2:06.65	
7	Oleg Rabota (KAZ)	2:06.81	
8	Geoffrey Cheah (HKG)	2:07.65	
