= Swimming at the 2002 Asian Games – Men's 400 metre freestyle =

Men's 400 metre freestyle at the 2002 Asian Games
- Venue: Sajik Swimming Pool
- Date: 2 October 2002
- Competitors: 10 from 7 nations

Medalists
gold medal	Shunichi Fujita	Japan
silver medal	Yu Cheng	China
bronze medal	Han Kyu-chul	South Korea

The men's 400 metre freestyle swimming competition at the 2002 Asian Games in Busan was held on 2 October at the Sajik Swimming Pool.

== Schedule ==
All times are Korea Standard Time (UTC+09:00)

Date	Time	Event
Wednesday, 2 October 2002	10:00	Heats
Wednesday, 2 October 2002	19:00	Final

== Records ==
Prior to this competition, the existing world, Asian and Games records were as follows.

World Record	Ian Thorpe (AUS)	3:40.08	Manchester, United Kingdom	30 July 2002
Asian Record	Shunichi Fujita (JPN)	3:50.36	Fukuoka, Japan	22 July 2001
Games Record	Torlarp Sethsothorn (THA)	3:53.61	Bangkok, Thailand	10 December 1998

== Results ==
Legend

- DNS — Did not start

=== Heats ===
Rank	Heat	Athlete	Time	Notes
1	2	Shunichi Fujita (JPN)	3:53.23	GR
2	1	Cho Sung-mo (KOR)	3:56.75	
3	2	Han Kyu-chul (KOR)	3:57.49	
4	2	Yu Cheng (CHN)	3:57.52	
5	2	Miguel Mendoza (PHI)	4:03.94	
6	1	Zheng Shibin (CHN)	4:04.13	
7	1	Takeshi Matsuda (JPN)	4:04.18	
8	1	Chung Kwok Leung (HKG)	4:05.59	
9	2	Naeem Al-Masri (SYR)	4:10.38	
—	1	Anas Abu Yousuf (QAT)	DNS	

=== Final ===
Rank	Athlete	Time	Notes
1st place, gold medalist(s)	Shunichi Fujita (JPN)	3:50.41	GR
2nd place, silver medalist(s)	Yu Cheng (CHN)	3:54.57	
3rd place, bronze medalist(s)	Han Kyu-chul (KOR)	3:56.10	
4	Cho Sung-mo (KOR)	3:57.87	
5	Miguel Mendoza (PHI)	4:01.11	
6	Zheng Shibin (CHN)	4:02.09	
7	Takeshi Matsuda (JPN)	4:02.98	
8	Chung Kwok Leung (HKG)	4:06.10	
