= Genki Imamura =

Japanese swimmer (born 1982)

Personal information
- Born: 17 March 1982 (age 44) Tomisato, Chiba, Japan
- Education: Tokai University
- Height: 1.73 m (5 ft 8 in)
- Weight: 65 kg (143 lb)

Sport
- Sport: Swimming
Medal record
Representing Japan
World Championships
Bronze medal – third place	2005 Montreal	200 m breaststroke
Universiade
Bronze medal – third place	2005 Izmir	200 m breaststroke
East Asian Games
Silver medal – second place	2005 Macau	4×100 m medley
Silver medal – second place	2005 Macau	100 m breaststroke
Bronze medal – third place	2005 Macau	200 m breaststroke

Genki Imamura (今村 元気, Imamura Genki; born March 17, 1982) is a Japanese swimmer who won a bronze medal in the 200 m breaststroke at the 2005 World Aquatics Championships. He finished 11th in the same event at the 2004 Summer Olympics.

== Biography ==
Imamura was named after the main character of the sports manga Ganbare Genki. At first, he competed in baseball, and only in high school started seriously training in swimming. In 2004, at the national championships he finished second after Kosuke Kitajima in the 200 m breaststroke. He thus qualified for the 2004 Olympics, but did not reach the finals. His peak came in 2005 when he won the national title in 200 m breaststroke, beating Kitajima, and finished second in the 100 m breaststroke. He then won a bronze medal at the World Championships, a bronze medal at the Universiade, and three medals at the 2005 East Asian Games.
