= Swimming at the 2002 Asian Games – Women's 400 metre freestyle =

Women's 400 metre freestyle at the 2002 Asian Games
- Venue: Sajik Swimming Pool
- Date: 3 October 2002
- Competitors: 10 from 6 nations

Medalists
gold medal	Sachiko Yamada	Japan
silver medal	Chen Hua	China
bronze medal	Tang Jingzhi	China

The women's 400 metre freestyle swimming competition at the 2002 Asian Games in Busan was held on 3 October at the Sajik Swimming Pool.

== Schedule ==
All times are Korea Standard Time (UTC+09:00)

Date	Time	Event
Thursday, 3 October 2002	10:00	Heats
Thursday, 3 October 2002	19:00	Final

== Records ==
Prior to this competition, the existing world, Asian and Games records were as follows.

World Record	Janet Evans (USA)	4:03.85	Seoul, South Korea	22 September 1988
Asian Record	Chen Yan (CHN)	4:05.00	Shanghai, China	17 October 1997
Games Record	Chen Hua (CHN)	4:12.31	Bangkok, Thailand	9 December 1998

== Results ==
=== Heats ===
Rank	Heat	Athlete	Time	Notes
1	2	Sachiko Yamada (JPN)	4:13.62	
2	2	Ha Eun-ju (KOR)	4:19.65	
3	2	Chen Hua (CHN)	4:19.71	
4	1	Tang Jingzhi (CHN)	4:21.39	
5	1	Pilin Tachakittiranan (THA)	4:23.21	
6	1	Madoka Ochi (JPN)	4:24.28	
7	1	Kim Ye-sul (KOR)	4:24.68	
8	2	Chorkaew Choompol (THA)	4:29.42	
9	2	Lizza Danila (PHI)	4:31.47	
10	1	U-Nice Chan (SIN)	4:33.55	

=== Final ===
Rank	Athlete	Time	Notes
1st place, gold medalist(s)	Sachiko Yamada (JPN)	4:07.23	GR
2nd place, silver medalist(s)	Chen Hua (CHN)	4:12.24	
3rd place, bronze medalist(s)	Tang Jingzhi (CHN)	4:15.82	
4	Ha Eun-ju (KOR)	4:19.89	
5	Pilin Tachakittiranan (THA)	4:21.46	
6	Madoka Ochi (JPN)	4:21.67	
7	Kim Ye-sul (KOR)	4:24.32	
8	Chorkaew Choompol (THA)	4:27.10	
