= Kim Bang-hyun =

South Korean swimmer (born 1979)

Kim Bang-Hyun OLY
Personal information
- Full name: Kim Bang-Hyun
- Nickname: Bryan Kim
- National team: South Korea
- Born: June 25, 1979 (age 47) Yangjae-dong, Seoul, South; Korea
- Height: 1.85 m (6 ft 1 in)
- Weight: 73 kg (161 lb)

Sport
- Sport: Swimming
- Strokes: Freestyle, butterfly, medley
- College team: University of Florida (U.S.)
- Coach: Gregg Troy (U.S.)
Medal record
Men's swimming
Representing South Korea
Asian Games
Bronze medal – third place	1998 Bangkok	4×200 m freestyle
Bronze medal – third place	2002 Busan	4×200 m freestyle

Kim Bang-Hyun OLY (also Bryan Kim, Korean: 김방현; born June 25, 1979) is a South Korean former swimmer who specialized in the individual medley but also competed in freestyle and butterfly events. He is a three-time Olympian (1996, 2000, and 2004), and a two-time bronze medalist in the freestyle relays at the Asian Games (1998 and 2002). Kim became the first ever South Korean swimmer to train in the United States, where he attended the University of Florida on a full athletic scholarship. While swimming for the Florida Gators under head coach Gregg Troy, Kim earned four All-American swimming honors in both the 200 and 400-meter individual medley events at the NCAA Championships. Kim also holds a total of eighteen South Korean records, set while competing for the Korean national team.

== Early years and education ==
Kim was born in Yangjae-dong, Seoul, South Korea, the son of Kevin and Jennifer Kim. He started swimming at the age of 10, despite that he did not like the sport much at first. He finally enjoyed the sport, when his family moved to Singapore and he trained for Mark Habel at the Singapore American School. He held school records in all individual events, and was eventually named the Most Valuable Swimmer of the Year by his school in 1994 and in 1995. Kim decided to return to his home South Korea in 1996, when he eventually became a member of the nation's swimming team.

After graduating from Yangjae High School, Kim attended the University of Florida in Gainesville, Florida on an athletic scholarship, and competed for the Florida Gators swimming and diving team under head coach Gregg Troy from 1997 to 2000. While swimming for the Gators, he received five All-American honors, and placed fourth in the 400 m individual medley at the Southeastern Conference (SEC) championships, with the school's sixth-fastest all-time record of 3:51.90.

== International career ==
Kim made his first South Korean team, as a 17-year-old, at the 1996 Summer Olympics in Atlanta. There, he failed to reach the top 16 final in any of his individual events, finishing twenty-sixth in the 200 m individual medley (2:06.99), and twenty-first in the 400 m individual medley (4:31.16).

At the 1998 FINA World Championships in Perth, Australia, Kim competed in three events, including the 200 m butterfly. In the 400 m individual medley, Kim missed the top 16 again by 0.08 of a second, but managed to pull off a seventeenth-place effort, as his best personal result, in a time of 4:30.91. In 1999, Kim entered his junior season for the Florida Gators, when he placed eighth in the same program at the U.S. Open in San Antonio, Texas, touching the wall in 4:30.19.

Kim shortened his program at the 2000 Summer Olympics in Sydney, when he swam only in the 400 m individual medley. Swimming in heat three, he picked up a seventh seed by a 6.35-second margin behind winner Alexey Kovrigin in 4:28.56. Kim failed to reach the top 8 final, as he placed thirty-third overall on the second day of preliminaries.

When his nation hosted the 2002 Asian Games in Busan, Kim won only a bronze medal, as a member of the South Korean team, in the 4×200 m freestyle relay (7:29.36). Kim also attempted for his first solo medal, but missed the podium twice in the 200 m individual medley (2:05.12), and 400 m individual medley (4:27.46) by more than two seconds.

At the 2004 Summer Olympics in Athens, Kim competed again in two swimming events, and also, served as a senior captain for the South Korean swimming team. After reaching the top 16 final from the Summer Universiade in Daegu, his entry times of 2:05.43 (200 m individual medley) and 4:25.40 (400 m individual medley) were both officially accredited under a FINA B-standard. On the first morning of the Games, Kim placed twentieth in the 400 m individual medley, his best finish in an Olympic career. Swimming in heat two, he set a South Korean record of 4:23.05 to claim a second spot by a 4.50-second margin behind winner Dean Kent of New Zealand. In the 200 m individual medley, Kim participated in heat three against seven other swimmers, including fellow three-time Olympian Jacob Carstensen of Denmark. He edged out Philippines' Miguel Molina to take another second spot by 0.22 of a second in 2:05.06. Kim ended his third Olympic stint with a thirty-second place effort in the preliminaries.

== Life after swimming ==
Kim graduated from the University of Florida with a bachelor's degree in psychology in 2001, and later, with a master's degree in applied physiology and kinesiology in 2005. He also received a doctor of philosophy in the same course at Temple University in Philadelphia, Pennsylvania in 2009, and has been named coordinator for the health sciences program at the University of the Sciences in 2011. Currently, he is working for the Federal Government. In addition, Dr. Kim is a part-time private swimming coach for CoachUp company, and a registered coach for USA Swimming.

Spending most of his time in United States since his collegiate swimming career, Kim is fluent in Korean and English.

== Personal bests (long course) ==
Kim held a South Korean record (4:23.05) in the 400 m individual medley from his third Olympics in 2004, until it was broken by Han Kyu-Chul at the Asian Games two years later (4:21.75).

Event	Time	Notes
100 m freestyle	51.66	
200 m freestyle	1:52.30	
200 m butterfly	2:02.03	
200 m individual medley	2:04.32	NR
400 m individual medley	4:23.05	NR

== See also ==
- List of University of Florida alumni
- List of University of Florida Olympians
