= Swimming at the 2002 Asian Games – Women's 800 metre freestyle =

Women's 800 metre freestyle at the 2002 Asian Games
- Venue: Sajik Swimming Pool
- Date: 5 October 2002
- Competitors: 11 from 8 nations

Medalists
gold medal	Chen Hua	China
silver medal	Sachiko Yamada	Japan
bronze medal	Zhang Yan	China

The women's 800 metre freestyle swimming competition at the 2002 Asian Games in Busan was held on 5 October at the Sajik Swimming Pool. It was a timed-final event, meaning that each swimmer only swam once, with the fastest eight (8) entrants swimming in the finals.

== Schedule ==
All times are Korea Standard Time (UTC+09:00)

Date	Time	Event
Saturday, 5 October 2002	10:00	Final 1
Saturday, 5 October 2002	19:00	Final 2

== Records ==
Prior to this competition, the existing world, Asian and Games records were as follows.

World Record	Janet Evans (USA)	8:16.22	Tokyo, Japan	20 August 1989
Asian Record	Zhang Liang (CHN)	8:26.48	Guangzhou, China	18 November 2001
Games Record	Luo Ping (CHN)	8:31.57	Hiroshima, Japan	7 October 1994

== Results ==
Rank	Heat	Athlete	Time	Notes
1st place, gold medalist(s)	2	Chen Hua (CHN)	8:25.36	AR
2nd place, silver medalist(s)	2	Sachiko Yamada (JPN)	8:28.77	
3rd place, bronze medalist(s)	2	Zhang Yan (CHN)	8:44.80	
4	2	Madoka Ochi (JPN)	8:57.47	
5	2	Kim Mi-ryung (KOR)	9:01.89	
6	2	Pilin Tachakittiranan (THA)	9:05.22	
7	2	Sia Wai Yen (MAS)	9:10.56	
8	1	Cho A-rum (KOR)	9:10.70	
9	1	Võ Thị Thanh Vy (VIE)	9:11.74	
10	1	U-Nice Chan (SIN)	9:27.13	
11	2	Lizza Danila (PHI)	9:27.92	
