= Ratapong Sirisanont =

Thai swimmer (born 1976)

Personal information
- Nickname: Nuk
- National team: Thailand
- Born: 1 July 1976 (age 50) Bangkok, Thailand
- Height: 1.80 m (5 ft 11 in)
- Weight: 76 kg (168 lb)

Sport
- Sport: Swimming
- Strokes: Freestyle, breaststroke, medley
- Club: Oakland Undercurrent (U.S.)
- College team: University of California, Berkeley (U.S.)
- Coach: Nort Thornton (U.S.)
Medal record
Men's swimming
Representing Thailand
Asian Games
| Gold medal – first place | 1994 Hiroshima | 200 m medley |
| Gold medal – first place | 1994 Hiroshima | 400 m medley |
| Silver medal – second place | 1998 Bangkok | 200 m breaststroke |
| Bronze medal – third place | 1994 Hiroshima | 200 m breaststroke |
| Bronze medal – third place | 1998 Bangkok | 400 m medley |
| Bronze medal – third place | 2002 Busan | 200 m breaststroke |
Southeast Asian Games
| Gold medal – first place | 2003 Hanoi | 100 m breaststroke |
| Gold medal – first place | 2003 Hanoi | 200 m breaststroke |
| Gold medal – first place | 2003 Hanoi | 200 m medley |
| Gold medal – first place | 2003 Hanoi | 400 m medley |

Ratapong "Nuk" Sirisanont (Thai: รัฐพงศ์ ศิริสานนท์; born July 1, 1976) is a Thai former swimmer, who specialized in breaststroke, but also competed in long-distance freestyle and individual medley. He is a four-time Olympian (1992, 1996, 2000, and 2004), a three-time Asian Games participant (1994, 1998, and 2002), and a seven-time SEA Games athlete (1991–2003). Regarded as Thailand's top swimmer, he has won a total of sixteen medals at the Southeast Asian Games since 1995, and six at the Asian Games, including two golds in the 200 and 400 m individual medley. At the 1996 Summer Olympics in Atlanta, Sirisanont became the first Thai swimmer to reach the final twice (both 200 and 400 m individual medley). Sirisanont is also one of three Southeast Asian swimmers, along with Malaysia's Alex Lim and Philippines' Miguel Molina, to train for the California Golden Bears in the United States, under head coach Nort Thornton.

== Swimming career ==
=== Early international career ===
Sirisanont began swimming at age seven, despite that he did not like the sport much at first. Admittedly, he had some breathing problems while jumping off into the water. In 1991, Sirisanont was selected to the Thai national team at his first Southeast Asian Games in Manila, where he won six medals (four golds and two bronze). His name was reached towards an early sport popularity, when he broke SEA Games records in three different events.

Sirisanont made his first Thai team, as a sixteen-year-old teen, at the 1992 Summer Olympics in Barcelona. He was ranked about the "middle of the road" in his individual events, finishing twenty-seventh in the 1500 m freestyle (16:08.02), twenty-ninth in the 400 m individual medley (4:37.95), and thirty-ninth each in the 400 m freestyle (4:07.95) and 200 m individual medley (2:11.02).

Shortly after his first Olympics, Sirisanont left his home nation Thailand to train for the Bolles School in Jacksonville, Florida, United States. While playing for Bolles, he had achieved numerous medals and school records in both long-distance freestyle and individual medley, including his first ever title from the Bishop Moore Invitational in Longwood, Florida|Longwood.

When he qualified for the 1994 Asian Games in Hiroshima, Japan, Sirisanont made his name as Thailand's best swimmer after winning two gold medals in swimming. During the Games, his nickname Nuk was echoing around the Hiroshima Big Wave Pool, when he swam with only 100 metres left to race against China's Xiong Guoming in the 400 m individual medley. Sirisanont missed the title by less than one second behind Xiong in a time of 4:20.03, leaving his country's fans to a distress. Few days later, he was eventually awarded a gold when Xiong failed the doping test.

At the 1996 Summer Olympics in Atlanta, Sirisanont competed in five swimming events, including his nation's place in the men's medley relay. He failed to reach the final (A or B) in two of his individual events, finishing twenty-sixth in the 100 m breaststroke (1:03.81), and twentieth in the 200 m breaststroke (2:17.32). After having a massive breakthrough at the Asian Games, Sirisanont had finally pulled off a top 16 effort in his two remaining tries. He placed fifteenth in the 200 m individual medley (2:05.02), and twelfth in the 400 m individual medley (4:26.35), which were both considered a best result for Thailand in swimming.

=== Golden Bears era ===
After graduating from Bolles School in 1997, Sirisanont moved to Berkeley, California to attend college at the University of California, Berkeley. He was also a member of the swimming and diving team for the California Golden Bears under head coach Nort Thornton. In 1999, Sirisanont became the first swimmer in Southeast Asia to earn two Pac-10 Championship titles in the 200 m breaststroke and 400 m individual medley.

When Thailand hosted the 1998 Asian Games in Bangkok, Sirisanont was expected to defend his titles in both 200 and 400 m individual medley. Before the start of the Games, he was rumored to be sick, and may lose his chances of claiming another gold medal because of failure to meet expectations from the SEA Games one year earlier. According to his Chinese coach, he had an allergy upon returning from the United States, and he went to get some medicine. Despite his media allegations, Sirisanont won only a silver and bronze medal in his home nation. He lost both of his titles to Japan's Takahiro Mori (400 m individual medley) and China's Xiong Guoming (200 m individual medley), who rivaled him in Hiroshima four years earlier.

At the 2000 Summer Olympics in Sydney, Sirisanont drastically shortened his program, swimming only in the 200 m breaststroke. Because he made poor decisions to drop most of his events, including the 200 and 400 m individual medley, Sirisanont delivered his worst Olympic feat with a forty-first-place effort on the morning prelims, finishing in a time of 2:23.95.

=== Redemption and retirement ===
Following his graduation from UC Berkeley in the spring of 2001, Sirisanont still continued to train for the California Golden Bears, but made his decision to consider retirement. In 2002, he rebounded from a severe distress by finishing second in the 200 m breaststroke (2:16.74) at the Janet Evans Invitational in Los Angeles, California. Sirisanont's appearance from a said tournament also signified his official return to the Thailand national team for the Asian Games in Busan, South Korea.

At his third Asian Games, Sirisanont won a bronze in the 200 m breaststroke, with his personal best of 2:15.81. He also campaigned for another medal in the 400 m individual medley, but pulled off with a seventh-place effort in 4:32.30.

In his sixth and final SEA Games stint, Sirisanont emerged himself again as Thailand's best swimmer after nine years. He won a total of four gold medals each in the 100 m breaststroke (1:03.13, pulling away from his teammate Vorrawuti Aumpiwan in the final 25 metres), 200 m breaststroke (2:16.67), 200 m individual medley (2:03.54), and 400 m individual medley (4:23.20, barely touching out Philippines' Miguel Molina by 0.06 seconds in a close race).

At the 2004 Summer Olympics in Athens, Sirisanont decided to focus more on the breaststroke, in which he had performed poorly in Sydney four years earlier. After producing a best tally of four gold medals from the SEA Games, his entry times of 1:03.13 (100 m breaststroke) and 2:16.67 (200 m breaststroke) were officially accredited under a FINA B-standard. On the first day of the Games, Sirisanont started his prelim run with another poor result. He swam in heat four of the 100 m breaststroke with a reaction time of 0.77, but was eventually disqualified for a false start. In his second event, 200 m breaststroke, Sirisanont lowered his personal best of 2:15.39 to lead the third heat. Sirisanont missed the semifinals by 0.71 of a second, finishing his Olympic run in nineteenth overall from the preliminaries. Since his debut 1992, Sirisanont was among the swimmers who campaigned for their fourth Olympics, along with Carl Probert (Fiji), Derya Büyükuncu (Turkey), Martina Moravcová (Slovakia), Lars Frölander (Sweden), and two-time freestyle champion Alexander Popov (Russia), who later became an official IOC member.

Shortly after his fourth Olympics, Sirisanont officially announced his retirement.

== See also ==
- List of University of California, Berkeley alumni
