= Takashi Nakano =

Japanese swimmer (born 1984)

Personal information
- National team: Japan
- Born: 21 July 1984 (age 42) Tachikawa, Tokyo, Japan
- Height: 1.73 m (5 ft 8 in)
- Weight: 64 kg (141 lb)

Sport
- Sport: Swimming
- Strokes: Backstroke
- Club: Mizuno
Medal record
Men's swimming
Representing Japan
Asian Games
Silver medal – second place	2002 Busan	200 m backstroke
Bronze medal – third place	2006 Doha	200 m backstroke
East Asian Games
Silver medal – second place	2005 Macau	100 m backstroke
Silver medal – second place	2005 Macau	200 m backstroke
Universiade
Silver medal – second place	2003 Daegu	200 m backstroke
Silver medal – second place	2005 İzmir	200 m backstroke
Silver medal – second place	2007 Bangkok	200 m backstroke

Takashi Nakano (中野 高, Nakano Takashi; born July 21, 1984) is a Japanese former swimmer, who specialized in backstroke events. He collected a total of three silver medals in the 200 m backstroke at the Universiade (2003 in Daegu, 2005 in İzmir, and 2007 in Bangkok). Nakano is also a graduate of Hosei University in Tokyo.

Nakano made his international debut at the 2002 Asian Games in Busan, South Korea, where he earned a silver medal in the 200 m backstroke, clocking at 2:00.78.

At the 2005 FINA World Championships in Montreal, Quebec, Canada, Nakano broke the two-minute barrier, but rounded out the final field in last place by 0.17 of a second behind Croatia's Gordan Kozulj in 1:58.91. Nakano also improved his personal best to 1:59.34, adding a bronze to his silver from Busan in the same stroke at the 2006 Asian Games in Doha, Qatar.

Nakano competed for the Japanese squad in the men's 200 m backstroke at the 2008 Summer Olympics in Beijing. Leading up to the Games, he placed second behind Ryosuke Irie at the Olympic trials in Tokyo with a FINA A-standard entry time of 1:58.22. He challenged seven other swimmers on the fourth heat, including Austrian duo Sebastian Stoss and two-time Olympic silver medalist Markus Rogan. Nakano raced to sixth place by a 0.15 of a second behind Stoss in a time of 1:59.59. Nakano missed out the semifinals by 0.65 of a second, as he placed twenty-first overall in the preliminary heats.

At the 2009 FINA World Championships in Rome, Italy, Nakano broke his personal best of 1:57.02 in the 200 m backstroke, but finished only in twelfth place and did not qualify for the final.
