= Oleg Shteynikov =

Kazakhstani swimmer (born 1985)

Personal information
- Native name: Олег Вячеславович Штейников
- Full name: Oleg Vyacheslavovich Shteynikov
- National team: Kazakhstan
- Born: 11 July 1985 (age 40) Almaty, Kazakhstan

Sport
- Sport: Swimming
Medal record
Men's swimming
Representing Kazakhstan
Islamic Solidarity Games
Gold medal – first place	2005 Mecca	50 m freestyle

Oleg Vyacheslavovich Shteynikov (Kazakh: Олег Вячеславович Штейников; born 11 July 1985 in Almaty) is a male freestyle swimmer from Kazakhstan, who competed for his native country at the 2004 Summer Olympics in Athens, Greece. There he ended up in 55th place in the men's 50m freestyle event.
