= Carlo Piccio =

Filipino swimmer (born 1981)

Personal information
- Full name: Juan Carlos Tanpinco Piccio
- National team: Philippines
- Born: 6 July 1981 (age 45) Bacolod, Philippines
- Height: 1.73 m (5 ft 8 in)
- Weight: 64 kg (141 lb)

Sport
- Sport: Swimming
- Strokes: Freestyle, medley
- Club: Mission Viejo Nadadores (U.S.)
- College team: University of Cincinnati (U.S.)
- Coach: Monty Hopkins (U.S.)
Medal record
Men's swimming
Representing the Philippines
Southeast Asian Games
Gold medal – first place	2003 Hanoi	4×200 m freestyle
Silver medal – second place	1999 Brunei	1500 m freestyle
Silver medal – second place	2001 Kuala Lumpur	400 m medley
Bronze medal – third place	2001 Kuala Lumpur	4×200 m freestyle
Bronze medal – third place	2003 Hanoi	400 m medley

Juan Carlos Tanpinco Piccio (born July 6, 1981) is a Filipino former swimmer, who specialized in long-distance freestyle and in individual medley events. He won a total of three medals, two silvers and one bronze, at the Southeast Asian Games (1999 and 2001), and later represented the Philippines at the 2000 Summer Olympics. He also holds numerous age group titles, including seven golds from the Philippine National Games, and more than five Filipino records in long-distance freestyle (400 and 1500 m) and in individual medley (400 m) during his sporting career. While residing in the United States, Piccio played for the Davie Nadadores Club in Mission Viejo, California, and later for the Cincinnati Bearcats swimming and diving team at the University of Cincinnati in Cincinnati, Ohio, where he became the team's rookie of the year (2002).

== Early years ==
Piccio was born in Bacolod, Negros Occidental, the son of Ernesto Piccio and Gina Tanpinco, and the eldest of three siblings in the family. His father Ernesto worked as a registered sugar planter, while his mother Gina owned a popular Bacolod Business Inn. His sister Patricia graduated with a bachelor's degree in organizational communication at the University of Cincinnati in Ohio, and later worked in Los Angeles. Piccio's youngest sister Mia, played for the Florida Gators golf team, and became a certified golfer.

Piccio started his sporting career at the age of nine under his father's urgency and desire. In 1995, he made his competitive debut at the Philippine National Games (Tagalog: Palarong Pambansa) in Manila, winning a total of seven golds. Three years later, he picked up four gold medals in the same tournament, and registered the same number of meet records, three of which remained unbroken until the present.

After competing in the National Games, Piccio attended the University of St. La Salle in Bacolod, but he decided to stop schooling for a year because of his long preparation for international tournaments, particularly the Olympic Games. In late 1998, Piccio left the Philippines to further continue his education and training in the United States. During his two-year visit, he lived with his aunt in Tustin, California, and later transferred to his foster father Brian Goodell, a 1976 Olympic champion in long-distance freestyle double (both 400 and 1500 m), in Mission Viejo. Piccio studied in his junior and senior season at the Mission Viejo High School, where he played for the Davie Nadadores Club, along with two other world-elite swimmers Juan Veloz of Mexico and Torwai Sethsothorn of Thailand.

== Career ==
=== College career ===
After graduating from Mission Viejo High School in 2000, Piccio accepted an athletic scholarship to attend the University of Cincinnati in Cincinnati, Ohio, where he played for the Cincinnati Bearcats swimming and diving team, under head coach Monty Hopkins. During his senior season, Piccio captured two gold medals in the 1650-yard freestyle (15:41.36) and in the 400-yard individual medley (3:54.93), his third straight title, at the Conference-USA Invitational in Houston, Texas. Piccio was also named Rookie of the Year in 2002, and was honored to be the team's top performer in long-distance freestyle (500, 1000, and 1650), in the 200-yard butterfly, and in the individual medley (200 and 400 m). In spring 2005, Piccio graduated from the university with a bachelor's degree in international marketing.

=== International career ===
Piccio made his official worldwide debut, as a member of the Philippine Olympic team, at the 1999 Southeast Asian Games in Bandar Seri Begawan, Brunei. He became the first Filipino to swim the 1500 m freestyle under a 16-minute barrier, earning a silver medal in 15:57.47.

At the 2000 Summer Olympics in Sydney, Piccio competed in two long-distance swimming events. He posted FINA B-standards of 15:57.47 (1500 m freestyle) from the SEA Games, and 4:33.49 (400 m individual medley) from the U.S. National Championships in Federal Way, Washington. In the 400 m individual medley, Piccio challenged seven other swimmers in heat two, including his high school teammate Juan Veloz of Mexico, 1996 Olympic silver medalist Jani Sievinen of Finland, and 16-year-old George Bovell of Trinidad and Tobago. He raced to fourth place and thirty-seventh overall by half the body length behind Bovell, lowering his Filipino record and a lifetime best to 4:30.17. Six days later, in the 1500 m freestyle, Piccio placed thirty-first on the morning prelims. Swimming in the same heat, he stormed home with an unexpected triumph over Argentina's Agustín Fiorilli by a 1.12-second advantage, breaking a new Filipino record of 15:51.50.

At the 2001 Southeast Asian Games in Kuala Lumpur, Malaysia, Piccio collected a silver in the 400 m individual medley (4:30.31), and bronze, as a member of the Philippine squad, in the 4 × 200 m freestyle relay (7:41.17).

Piccio was expected to compete in three swimming events at the 2002 Asian Games in Busan, South Korea, but arrived late as he was stranded in Japan for a long period because of a strong typhoon. In his only event, 400 m individual medley, Piccio rounded out the final to eighth place with a time of 4:33.88.

At the 2003 Southeast Asian Games in Hanoi, Vietnam, Piccio pocketed a bronze medal in the 400 m individual medley at 4:31.52, handing an entire medal haul for the Philippines in a 2–3 finish with Miguel Molina. He also helped the Filipinos capture the title in the 4 × 200 m freestyle, but they were eventually disqualified for an alleged technical infraction. On February 18, 2004, Piccio, along with Molina, Miguel Mendoza, and Mark Kalaw, reinstated their gold medals in the event, after the Philippine Olympic Committee, headed by Celso Dayrit, lodged an official protest to the SEA Games organizers about the Omega automatic timing system's erroneous results.

Piccio also sought his bid for the 2004 Summer Olympics in Athens, but eventually lost to Molina, who registered a much faster time in the 400 m individual medley under a FINA B-standard (a country was allowed to enter one swimmer per event).

Shortly after his graduation from the university in 2005, Piccio announced his retirement from swimming. He informed Philippine Amateur Swimming Association (PASA) president Mark Joseph of his final decision in a letter: "Swimming has been my life for 15 years now and I have gone through four Southeast (SEA) Asian Games, two Asian Games, one World Championships and one Olympics".
