= Wu Peng =

Chinese swimmer

Personal information
- Full name: Wu Peng
- Nationality: Chinese
- Born: May 16, 1987 (age 39) Hangzhou, Zhejiang, China
- Height: 1.80 m (5 ft 11 in) (2008)
- Weight: 72 kg (159 lb) (2008)

Sport
- Sport: Swimming
- Strokes: Butterfly
Medal record
World Championships (LC)
Silver medal – second place	2007 Melbourne	200 m butterfly
Bronze medal – third place	2005 Montreal	200 m butterfly
Bronze medal – third place	2011 Shanghai	200 m butterfly
Bronze medal – third place	2013 Barcelona	200 m butterfly
World Championships (SC)
Gold medal – first place	2006 Shanghai	200 m butterfly
Bronze medal – third place	2004 Indianapolis	200 m butterfly
Asian Games
Gold medal – first place	2002 Busan	200m backstroke
Gold medal – first place	2002 Busan	200m butterfly
Gold medal – first place	2002 Busan	400m individual medley
Silver medal – second place	2002 Busan	4×200m freestyle relay
Gold medal – first place	2006 Doha	200m butterfly

Wu Peng (simplified Chinese: 吴鹏; traditional Chinese: 吳鵬; pinyin: Wú Péng; born May 16, 1987, in Hangzhou, Zhejiang) is a Chinese swimmer. He has concentrated on the butterfly since the 10th National Games in 2005.

== Early life and career ==
Wu's parents first sent him to the pool when he was four years old as an exercise for weight-loss.

He first decided to dedicate himself to swimming while watching swimming in the 1996 Olympics; the best result for Chinese men's swimming was 4th place in 50m freestyle, while Chinese women's swimming got gold. Wu said to his father that he wanted to be the first Chinese man to stand on the podium for Olympic swimming.

Wu's father died of a heart attack in 2003 while meeting Wu to bring him home for the weekend after practice.

== Career ==
At the 2004 Athens Olympics, when he was only 17, Wu Peng made the 200 m butterfly final and became the only Chinese swimmer to finish in the top eight at the games. It was only Wu's first Olympics, and the team was satisfied with his performance.

At the 2006 short course World Championships in Shanghai, Wu won the 200 m butterfly in a championships record. He also won the bronze medal at the 2005 World Long Course Championships in Montreal, and the silver behind Michael Phelps at the 2007 World Long Course Championships in Melbourne, both times at 200 m butterfly. At the Beijing Olympics, he carried the nation's hopes for a breakthrough in swimming. Although making it to the finals, he managed a joint fourth with the New Zealand swimmer Moss Burmester.

He suffered an injury in 2009 and could not make it to the World Long Course Championships to try for the podium once again.

Wu himself has said that if he were to medal in the London 2012 Olympics, he would consider his career to have been full and satisfying.

Wu Peng defeated Michael Phelps in the 200 fly in consecutive events, at the Michigan Grand Prix and Charlotte UltraSwim, in 2012 ending Michael Phelps' streak of 60 wins in nearly 9 years.

In 2023, Wu staged a comeback at the Chinese Spring National Championships and the Chinese National Championships, a decade after his retirement. His aim was to take part in the 2023 Asian Games which would be held in his home city of Hangzhou. However he failed to qualify after finishing 5th in the 50m butterfly event.

== Major achievements ==
- 2002 Asian Games: First, men's 200 m backstroke, 200 m butterfly and 400 m individual medley
- 2004 Olympics – Finalist, 200m butterfly
- 2004 National Swimming Championship & Olympic Trial – First, men's 400 m individual medley and 200 m butterfly
- 2005 National Swimming Championship & National Games Qualifiers – First, men's 400 m individual medley
- 2005 World Championships – bronze, men's 200m butterfly
- 2005 East Asian Games – First, 400 IM; Second, 200 fly
- 2006 Short Course Worlds – First, men's 200 m butterfly
- 2007 World Championships – silver, men's 200m butterfly
- 2008 Olympics – Finalist (fourth-place finish), 200m butterfly
- 2011 World Aquatics Championships – Bronze, 200m butterfly
