= Yoo Jung-nam =

South Korean swimmer (born 1983)

Personal information
- Full name: Yoo Jung-nam
- National team: South Korea
- Born: 12 September 1983 (age 42) Busan, South Korea
- Height: 1.76 m (5 ft 9 in)
- Weight: 70 kg (154 lb)

Korean name
- Hangul: 유정남
- RR: Yu Jeongnam
- MR: Yu Chŏngnam

Sport
- Sport: Swimming
- Strokes: Butterfly
- College team: Seoul National University
Medal record
Men's swimming
Representing South Korea
Asian Games
Bronze medal – third place	2002 Busan	4×100 m medley
East Asian Games
Silver medal – second place	2005 Macau	4×200 m freestyle
Bronze medal – third place	2005 Macau	200 m butterfly
Bronze medal – third place	2005 Macau	4×100 m medley

Yoo Jung-nam (Korean: 유정남; born 12 September 1983) is a South Korean swimmer, who specialized in butterfly events. He represented his nation South Korea at the 2008 Summer Olympics, and has won a career total of four medals (one silver and three bronze) in a major international competition, spanning the 2002 Asian Games and the 2005 East Asian Games. Yoo is also a member of the swimming team and a graduate of physical education at Seoul National University.

Yoo competed for the South Korean swimming team in the men's 200 m butterfly at the 2008 Summer Olympics in Beijing. Leading up to the Games, he topped the field with a time of 2:00.77 to make the FINA B-cut at the Dong-A Swimming Championships in Ulsan. Rallying from sixth at the 150-metre turn in heat two, Yoo put in a late surge on the final lap to edge out the frontrunners Douglas Lennox-Silva of Puerto Rico and Vladan Marković of Serbia by almost a full-body length for the fourth spot in 2:01.00. Yoo failed to advance into the semifinals, as he placed thirty-fourth out of 44 swimmers in the prelims.
