= Jiro Miki =

Japanese swimmer (born 1983)

Jiro Miki OLY
Personal information
- Full name: Jiro Miki
- National team: Japan
- Born: 31 May 1983 (age 43) Ōtsu, Shiga, Japan
- Height: 1.81 m (5 ft 11 1/2 in)
- Weight: 72 kg (159 lb)

Sport
- Sport: Swimming
- Strokes: Individual medley
Medal record
Men's swimming
Representing Japan
Asian Games
Silver medal – second place	2002 Busan	200 m medley

Jiro Miki (三木 二郎, Miki Jiro; born May 31, 1983) is a Japanese former swimmer, who specialized in individual medley events. He is a two-time Olympian (2000 and 2004), a double Olympic finalist in both 200 and 400 m individual medley, and a silver medalist at the 2002 Asian Games in Busan, South Korea.

Miki made his first Japanese team, as a 17-year-old teen, at the 2000 Summer Olympics in Sydney. He failed to reach the top 8 final of the 200 m individual medley, finishing his semifinal run with a slowest time of 2:03.90.

At the 2002 Asian Games in Busan, South Korea, Miki touched out China's Ouyang Kunpeng to earn a silver medal in the men's 200 m individual medley (2:02.07), giving Japan its straight 1–2 finish.

Miki extended his swimming program at the 2004 Summer Olympics in Athens, competing in two medley events. He achieved FINA A-standards of 1:59.99 (200 m individual medley) and 4:14.79 (400 m individual medley) from the Olympic trials in Tokyo. On the first day of the Games, Miki placed seventh in the 400 m individual medley with a time of 4:19.97, edging out Australia's Travis Nederpelt by 0.11 seconds. Five days later, in the 200 m individual medley, Miki rounded out the top 8 final to last place in 2:02.16, five seconds behind winner, U.S. swimmer, and eventual Olympic record holder Michael Phelps.
