= Mark Kwok (swimmer) =

Hong Kong swimmer

Personal information
- Native name: 郭建明
- Full name: Mark Kwok Kin-ming
- National team: Hong Kong
- Born: 20 June 1977 (age 49) Laguna Hills, California, U.S.
- Height: 1.75 m (5 ft 9 in)
- Weight: 77 kg (170 lb)

Sport
- Sport: Swimming
- Strokes: Freestyle, butterfly, medley
- Club: HYFCO Travel Agency
- College team: University of Southern California (U.S.)
- Coach: Mark Schubert (U.S.)
Medal record
Men's swimming
Representing Hong Kong
Asian Games
Bronze medal – third place	1998 Bangkok	400 m freestyle

Mark Kwok Kin-ming (Jyutping: gwok^{3} gin^{3}ming^{4}; born 20 June 1977) is a former swimmer for Hong Kong, who specialized in middle-distance freestyle but also competed in butterfly and individual medley. He is a two-time Olympian (1996 and 2000), and a bronze medalist at the 1998 Asian Games in Bangkok, Thailand. He also holds numerous Hong Kong records in 200, 400, and 800 m freestyle, and retains a dual resident status to compete internationally for his father's homeland. While studying in the United States, Kwok has competed for the USC Trojans, and has received four All-American honors at the NCAA Men's Swimming and Diving Championships in four consecutive seasons.

== Early years ==
Kwok was born in Laguna Hills, California from a Hong Kong father and an American mother, giving him distinct, blond-haired and blue-eyed features, and a dual residential status. He started swimming at the age of four, when his mother sent him to a small local club: "I loved it. I never wanted to get out of the water, whether it was in the pool or at the beach. I guess I took to the water right away." During his early childhood Kwok learned the essentials of competitive swimming, and then moved on to South Coast Aquatics, where the workouts and skills became more challenging for him. After South Coast Aquatics ceased operations, Kwok joined numerous small clubs until he finally settled with the Mission Viejo Nadadores under head coach Terry Stoddard.

Kwok attended Laguna Hills High School, where he competed for the swimming team, and achieved senior national marks in the 200 and 400 m individual medley, and in the long-distance freestyle (400 and 1500 m). He also earned the Laguna Hills High Academic Achievement Award and U.S. Swimming Scholastic All-American Award for his continuous success in the sport, received all-league honors, and became one of the school's top students on the academic honor roll with a 4.02 grade-point average.

== Career ==
=== College career ===
After graduating from Laguna Hills High School in 1995, Kwok accepted an athletic scholarship to attend the University of Southern California in Los Angeles, where he represented the USC Trojans swimming and diving team under head coach Mark Schubert. While swimming for the Trojans, he received four All-American honors in the 400-yard freestyle, and in the 4×200-yard freestyle relay. In his junior season, Kwok won the 200-yard freestyle (1:37.53), the 500-yard freestyle (4:25.09) and the 400-yard individual medley (3:55.26) at a dual college meet in Santa Barbara, California; all of his triumphs in each event were considered an NCAA mark. Kwok also competed for four consecutive seasons at the NCAA Men's Swimming and Diving Championships before he graduated from the university with a bachelor's degree in business administration in 1999.

=== International career ===
Due to his paternal heritage, Kwok retained an independent athletic status and held his family dual residency to compete internationally for Hong Kong in swimming. Kwok's major international debut came as a 19-year-old at the 1996 Summer Olympics in Atlanta. There, he failed to reach the top 16 final in any of his individual events, finishing twentieth in the 400 m individual medley (4:31.13), thirty-fourth in the 200 m butterfly (2:04.01), and twenty-ninth each in the 400 m freestyle (4:02.68) and in the 200 m individual medley (2:07.61).

At the 1998 FINA World Championships in Perth, Australia, Kwok placed twenty-second in the 400 m freestyle (4:00.94), thirty-second in the 200 m butterfly (2:04.42), and twenty-third in the 200 m individual medley (2:07.30), all from the prelims. Out of four individual tries, Kwok only reached the B-Final in the 400 m individual medley, where he pulled off a fifteenth-place effort in a time of 4:30.66.

In that same year at the Asian Games in Bangkok, Thailand, Kwok powered home with a well-deserved bronze medal in the 400 m freestyle, earning Hong Kong's first podium finish in swimming. He established a national record of 4:00.44 to hold off South Korea's Woo Chul in his last-gasp surge by 0.22 of a second.

At the 2000 Summer Olympics in Sydney, Kwok decided to drop all of his individual medley events, and experiment with the 200 m freestyle. He posted FINA B-standards of 1:52.48 (200 m freestyle), 4:01.97 (400 m freestyle), and 2:04.00 (200 m butterfly) from the Asian Championships in Busan, South Korea. On the first day of the Games, Kwok placed thirtieth in the 400 m freestyle. Swimming in heat two, he broke a four-minute barrier and a new Hong Kong record of 3:58.94 to earn a second spot by almost half the body length behind his former rival Woo. The following day, in the 200 m freestyle, Kwok finished twenty-sixth with a time of 1:52.71, just 0.23 seconds off his entry time. In his final event, 200 m butterfly, Kwok placed thirty-second on the morning prelims. Swimming again in heat two, he blasted a Hong Kong record of 2:01.99 to pick up a third seed by almost two seconds behind winner Anthony Ang of Malaysia.

Two years later, at the 2002 Asian Games in Busan, South Korea, Kwok rounded out the final to eighth place in the 200 m butterfly with a time of 2:03.91. He also placed fifth as a member of the Hong Kong team in the 4 × 200 m freestyle relay (7:44.73), and sixth in the 4 × 100 m medley relay (3:54.01). Shortly after the Games, Kwok announced his retirement from swimming to pursue other opportunities.

== See also ==
- USC Trojans
- List of University of Southern California people
- List of Hong Kong records in swimming
