= Huang Shaohua =

Chinese swimmer (born 1984)

Personal information
- Born: January 31, 1984 (age 42) Nanning, Guangxi, China

Sport
- Sport: Swimming
Medal record
Representing China
Asian Games
Gold medal – first place	2002 Busan	4x100m freestyle relay
Silver medal – second place	2006 Doha	4x100m freestyle relay

Huang Shaohua (born January 31, 1984) is a Chinese swimmer who competed for Team China at the 2008 Summer Olympics.

== Major achievements ==
- 2000 Guangxi Regional Games - 1st 100 m free;
- 2002 Asian Games - 1st 4×100 m free relay;
- 2003 National Intercity Games - 1st 100 m free;
- 2003 World Championships - 8th 4×200 m free relay;
- 2004 National Champions Tournament & Olympic Selective Trials - 2nd 100 m/200 m free;
- 2005 National Games - 2nd 100 m free

== Records ==
- 2008 National Champions Tournament - 3:17.9, 4×100 m free relay (AR)
