= Takahiro Mori =

Japanese swimmer (born 1980)

Personal information
- Full name: 森 隆弘
- Nationality: Japan
- Born: March 2, 1980 (age 46) Kumamoto
- Height: 1.76 m (5 ft 9 in)
- Weight: 74 kg (163 lb)

Sport
- Sport: Swimming
- Strokes: Medley
Medal record
Men's swimming
Pan Pacific Championships
| Silver medal – second place | 2002 Yokohama | 200m Medley |
| Bronze medal – third place | 2002 Yokohama | 400m Medley |
Asian Games
| Gold medal – first place | 2002 Busan | 200m Medley |
| Silver medal – second place | 2002 Busan | 400m Medley |
Summer Universiade
| Gold medal – first place | 2001 Beijing | 200m Medley |
| Gold medal – first place | 2003 Daegu | 200m Medley |
| Gold medal – first place | 2003 Daegu | 400m Medley |
| Bronze medal – third place | 1999 Palma | 200m Medley |
| Bronze medal – third place | 1999 Palma | 400m Medley |

Takahiro Mori (森 隆弘, Mori Takahiro; born March 2, 1980 in Kumamoto) is a retired male medley swimmer from Japan. He represented his native country at the 2004 Summer Olympics in Athens, Greece. He is best known for winning three gold medals at the Summer Universiade.
