= Han Kyu-chul =

South Korean swimmer (born 1981)

Personal information
- Full name: Han Kyu-chul
- National team: South Korea
- Born: 24 December 1981 (age 44)
- Height: 1.81 m (5 ft 11 in)
- Weight: 75 kg (165 lb)

Korean name
- Hangul: 한규철
- RR: Han Gyucheol
- MR: Han Kyuch'ŏl

Sport
- Sport: Swimming
- Strokes: Freestyle, butterfly, medley
Medal record
Men's swimming
Representing South Korea
Asian Games
Bronze medal – third place	2002 Busan	400 m freestyle
Bronze medal – third place	2002 Busan	1500 m freestyle
Bronze medal – third place	2002 Busan	4×100 m freestyle
Bronze medal – third place	2002 Busan	4×200 m freestyle
Bronze medal – third place	2006 Doha	200 m medley
Bronze medal – third place	2006 Doha	400 m medley
Bronze medal – third place	2006 Doha	4×100 m freestyle
Bronze medal – third place	2006 Doha	4×200 m freestyle

Han Kyu-chul (Korean: 한규철; born December 24, 1981) is a South Korean former swimmer, who specialized in freestyle, butterfly, and individual medley events. He is a two-time Olympian (2000 and 2004), and an eight-time bronze medalist at the Asian Games (2002 and 2006).

Han made his first South Korean team, as an eighteen-year-old junior, at the 2000 Summer Olympics in Sydney. There, he failed to reach the semifinals in any of his individual events, finishing nineteenth in the 200 m butterfly (1:59.85), and thirty-third in the 200 m individual medley (2:06.42).

When South Korea hosted the 2002 Asian Games in Busan, Han won a total of four medals, including two in the freestyle relays. He also enjoyed his teammate Cho Sung-Mo by giving the Koreans a 2–3 finish in the 1500 m freestyle, earning him a bronze in 15:22.38.

At the 2004 Summer Olympics in Athens, Han shortened his program, swimming only in the men's 200 m freestyle. He cleared a FINA B-standard entry time of 1:50.54 from the World Championships in Barcelona, Spain. He challenged seven other swimmers in heat five, including three-time Olympian Jacob Carstensen of Denmark. Han rounded out the field to last place by two hundredths of a second (0.02) behind Hungary's Tamás Szűcs, outside his entry time of 1:52.28. Han failed to advance into the semifinals, as he placed thirty-third overall in the preliminaries.

At the 2006 Asian Games in Doha, Han added four more bronze medals to his collection for a total of eight. He also helped out his South Korean team, including three-time champion Park Tae-Hwan, to defend their medals from Busan in the 400 and 800 m freestyle relays.
