= Koh Yun-ho =

South Korean swimmer (born 1978)

Personal information
- Born: 26 August 1978 (age 48) Pyeongchang County, Gangwon Province, South Korea

Sport
- Sport: Swimming
Medal record
Representing South Korea
Asian Games
Bronze medal – third place	1998 Bangkok	4x200m freestyle relay
Bronze medal – third place	2002 Busan	4x100m freestyle relay
Bronze medal – third place	2002 Busan	4x200m freestyle relay
Bronze medal – third place	2002 Busan	4x100m medley relay

Koh Yun-ho (Korean: 고운호; born 26 August 1978) is a South Korean swimmer. He competed in four events at the 1996 Summer Olympics.
