= Yoshihiro Okumura (swimmer) =

Japanese swimmer (born 1983)

Medal record

Men's swimming

Representing Japan

Olympic Games
| Bronze medal – third place | 2004 Athens | 4x100 m medley relay |

Asian Games
| Silver medal – second place | 2002 Busan | 200 metre freestyle |

Summer Universiade
| Gold medal – first place | 2003 Daegu | 200 m freestyle |
| Silver medal – second place | 2005 Izmir | 4x200 m freestyle |

Pan Pacific Championships
| Silver medal – second place | 2010 Irvine | 4x200 m freestyle |

Yoshihiro Okumura (奥村 幸大, Okumura Yoshihiro; born 9 May 1983 in Osaka, Japan) is a Japanese international swimmer, competing in the freestyle. At the 2003 Summer Universiade, he won the title in the Men's 200m Freestyle. He won the bronze medal in the 2004 Summer Olympics in the Men's 4 × 100 m Medley Relay.
