= Ouyang Kunpeng =

Chinese swimmer (born 1982)

Personal information
- Full name: Ouyang Kunpeng
- Nationality: China
- Born: November 19, 1982 (age 43) Jiangxi
- Height: 1.86 m (6 ft 1 in)
- Weight: 77 kg (170 lb)

Sport
- Sport: Swimming
- Strokes: backstroke
Medal record
Asian Games
| Silver medal – second place | 2006 Doha | 50 m backstroke |
| Silver medal – second place | 2006 Doha | 100 m backstroke |
| Silver medal – second place | 2006 Doha | 200 m backstroke |
| Silver medal – second place | 2006 Doha | 4×100 m medley |
| Bronze medal – third place | 2002 Busan | 200m medley |

Ouyang Kunpeng (simplified Chinese: 欧阳鲲鹏; traditional Chinese: 歐陽鯤鵬; pinyin: Ōuyáng Kūnpéng; born November 19, 1982, in Jiangxi) is a Chinese swimmer and China's top male backstroker, holding the Chinese record in the long course and short course 50m, 100m, and 200m backstroke. He competed at the 2000 and 2004 Summer Olympics.

In May 2008, he was banned for life from the sport for a positive anti-doping test. In July 2008, FINA announced his lifetime ban by the Chinese Swimming Association with a posting on their anti-doping website. As of December 2010, this posting has been updated with a change of the ban from lifetime to 2-years.

In December 2010, an AP report surfaced which indicated that his lifetime ban had been converted to a more-conventional 2-year ban; however, Ouyang was experience difficulties in return to competition in China, where the lifetime ban originated and was still in place.

== Personal bests ==
In long course

- 50m backstroke: 25.18 (December 4, 2005)
- 100m backstroke: 54.41 (December 5, 2005)
