= Liu Yu (swimmer) =

Chinese swimmer (born 1982)

Personal information
- Born: January 19, 1982 (age 44) Dandong, China

Sport
- Sport: Swimming
Medal record
Representing China
Asian Games
Gold medal – first place	2002 Busan	200m freestyle
Gold medal – first place	2002 Busan	4x100m freestyle relay
Silver medal – second place	2002 Busan	100m freestyle
Silver medal – second place	2002 Busan	4x200m freestyle relay

Liu Yu (born 19 January 1982) is a Chinese former freestyle swimmer who competed in the 2004 Summer Olympics.
