= Sung Min (swimmer) =

South Korean swimmer (born 1982)

Personal information
- National team: South Korea
- Born: 15 October 1982 (age 43) Cerritos, California, United States
- Height: 1.80 m (5 ft 11 in)
- Weight: 64 kg (141 lb)

Sport
- Sport: Swimming
- Strokes: Freestyle, backstroke
- College team: Korea National Sports University
Medal record
Men's swimming
Representing South Korea
Universiade
Silver medal – second place	2005 İzmir	50 m backstroke
Asian Games
Bronze medal – third place	2002 Busan	4×100 m freestyle
Bronze medal – third place	2002 Busan	4×100 m medley
Bronze medal – third place	2006 Doha	50 m backstroke
Bronze medal – third place	2006 Doha	4×100 m freestyle
Bronze medal – third place	2006 Doha	4×100 m medley

Sung Min (also Seong Min, Korean: 성민; born 15 October 1982) is a South Korean former swimmer, who specialized in freestyle and backstroke events. He represented South Korea in three editions of the Olympic Games (2000 to 2008), and held multiple national championship titles and swimming records in the relay freestyle and backstroke events (50, 100, and 200 m). Sung had also won a total of five bronze medals, including one from the 50 m backstroke, at the 2002 Asian Games in Busan, South Korea, and at the 2006 Asian Games in Doha, Qatar.

== Career ==
Sung's Olympic debut came as a seventeen-year-old teen at the 2000 Summer Olympics in Sydney. There, he posted a lifetime best of 57.12 to lead the second heat of men's 100 m backstroke by exactly one second ahead of Uruguay's Diego Gallo, but finished only in thirty-first place from the prelims. Two years later, Sung won two bronze medals, as a member of the South Korean swimming team, in the men's 400 m freestyle and medley relay at the 2002 Asian Games in Busan, with a total time of 3:23.58 and 3:46.44, respectively.

On his second Olympic appearance in Athens 2004, Sung failed to reach the top 16 in any of his individual events, finishing thirtieth in the 100 m backstroke (56.78), and thirty-second in the 200 m backstroke (2:04.86).

At the 2005 Summer Universiade in İzmir, Turkey, Sung defeated Japan's Masafumi Yamaguchi and United States' Matt Grevers to earn a silver medal by two hundredths of a second (0.02) in the 50 m backstroke, posting a lifetime best of 25.59. The following year, he snared the bronze medal in the same event at the 2006 Asian Games in Doha, Qatar, lowering his time at 25.57 seconds.

Eight years after competing in his first Olympics, Sung qualified for his third South Korean team, as a 25-year-old, at the 2008 Summer Olympics in Beijing. He broke a new South Korean record on a bodysuit and cleared a FINA B-cut time of 55.43 (100 m backstroke) from the Good Luck Beijing China Open. In the 100 m backstroke, Sung challenged seven other swimmers on the third heat, including five-time Olympian Derya Büyükuncu of Turkey. He finished ahead of France's Benjamin Stasiulis in fourth place by a nine hundredth (0.09) margin, lowering his Olympic time to 54.99 seconds. Sung failed to advance into the semifinals, as he placed twenty-third out of 45 swimmers in the evening preliminaries.

== Personal life ==
Born and raised in Cerritos, California, United States, Sung holds a dual citizenship to train and compete internationally for South Korea in swimming. He is now a founder and coach for age group swimmers at the Rapids Swim Club in Los Angeles.
