= Daisuke Hosokawa =

Japanese swimmer (born 1982)

Personal information
- Full name: Daisuke Hosokawa
- Nationality: Japan
- Born: April 18, 1982 (age 44) Amagasaki, Hyōgo
- Height: 188 cm (6 ft 2 in)
- Weight: 89 kg (196 lb)

Sport
- Sport: Swimming
- Strokes: Freestyle
Medal record
World Championships (LC)
Silver medal – second place	2007 Melbourne	4x100 m medley relay
Bronze medal – third place	2003 Barcelona	4x100 m medley relay
Bronze medal – third place	2005 Montreal	4x100 m medley relay
Asian Games
Gold medal – first place	2002 Busam	4x200 m freestyle relay
Gold medal – first place	2006 Doha	4x100 m medley relay
Gold medal – first place	2006 Doha	4x100 m freestyle relay
Gold medal – first place	2006 Doha	4x200 m freestyle relay
Silver medal – second place	2002 Busam	4x100 m freestyle relay
Bronze medal – third place	2002 Busam	100 m freestyle
Bronze medal – third place	2006 Doha	100 m freestyle
Bronze medal – third place	2006 Doha	200 m freestyle
Summer Universiade
Silver medal – second place	2005 Izmir	4x200 m freestyle relay

Daisuke Hosokawa (細川 大輔, Hosokawa Daisuke) (born April 18, 1982, in Amagasaki, Hyōgo) is a Japanese freestyle swimmer.

He is married to former swimmer Aya Terakawa.

== Personal bests ==
In long course:

- 50m freestyle: 23.08 (October 2, 2006)
- 100m freestyle: 49.86 (April 1, 2007)
- 200m freestyle: 1:49.22 (August 23, 2007)
