= Chen Zuo =

Chinese swimmer (born 1982)

Personal information
- Full name: Chen Zuo
- National team: China
- Born: January 19, 1982 (age 44) Beijing, China
- Height: 1.85 m (6 ft 1 in)
- Weight: 79 kg (174 lb)

Sport
- Sport: Swimming
- Strokes: Freestyle
Medal record
Representing China
Asian Games
Gold medal – first place	2002 Busan	100m freestyle
Gold medal – first place	2002 Busan	4x100m freestyle relay
Gold medal – first place	2006 Doha	100m freestyle
Gold medal – first place	2010 Guangzhou	4x100m freestyle relay
Silver medal – second place	2002 Busan	4x200m freestyle relay
Silver medal – second place	2002 Busan	4x100m medley relay
Silver medal – second place	2006 Doha	4x100m freestyle relay
Silver medal – second place	2006 Doha	4x200m freestyle relay
Silver medal – second place	2006 Doha	4x100m medley relay

Chen Zuo (born 19 January 1982 in Beijing) is a Chinese swimmer, who competed for Team China at the 2004 Summer Olympics, the 2008 Summer Olympics and the 2012 Summer Olympics. In 2004 he competed in the men's 50 m freestyle and the 4 x 100 and 4 × 200 m freestyle relays. In 2008 he competed in the men's 100 m freestyle and the 4 × 100 m freestyle relay. He served as the former captain of the Chinese National Swimming Team from 2006 to 2013.

== Major achievements ==
- 1998 National Games – 1st 1500m free;
- 2000 National Champions Tournament - 2nd 200 m free；
- 2001/2005 National Games – 1st 100 m free;
- 2002 Asian Games – 1st 100 m free/4×100 m free relay;
- 2003 World Championships – 8th 4×200 m free relay;
- 2003 National Champions Tournament – 1st 50 m free/100 m free/200 m free/4x200 m free relay;
- 2004 National Champions Tournament – 1st 100 m free;
- 2005 National Champions Tournament – 1st 100 m free;
- 2006 Asian Games – 1st 100 m free

== Records ==
- 2003 National Champions Tournament – (NR);
- 2006 Asian Games – 49.06 (AR);
- 2008 National Champions Tournament – (AR);
- 2009 National Champions Tournament – 48.73 (AR)

== See also ==
- China at the 2012 Summer Olympics – Swimming
