= Petr Vasiliev =

Uzbekistani swimmer (born 1981)

Personal information
- Full name: Petr Vasiliev
- National team: Uzbekistan
- Born: 21 April 1981 (age 45)
- Height: 1.77 m (5 ft 10 in)
- Weight: 76 kg (168 lb)

Sport
- Sport: Swimming
- Strokes: Freestyle

Petr Vasiliev (also Pyotr Vasiliev, Uzbek: Пётр Васильев; born April 21, 1981) is an Uzbek former swimmer, who specialized in freestyle events. He is a two-time Olympian (2000 and 2004), and a top 16 finalist in the 200 m freestyle at the 2002 Asian Games in Busan, South Korea.

Vasiliev made his first Uzbek squad at the 2000 Summer Olympics in Sydney, where he competed only in the 4×100 m freestyle relay, along with Ravil Nachaev, Oleg Tsvetkovskiy, and Oleg Pukhnatiy. Vasiliev supposedly swam a third leg in the first heat, but his team was disqualified due to an early relay takeoff by Pukhnatiy.

At the 2004 Summer Olympics in Athens, Vasiliev qualified as an individual swimmer for the men's 200 m freestyle. He cleared a FINA B-standard entry time of 1:54.94 from the World Championships in Barcelona, Spain. He challenged seven other swimmers in heat two, including dual citizen Mihail Alexandrov of Bulgaria. He rounded out the field to last place by less than 0.18 of a second behind Kazakhstan's Vitaliy Khan, outside his entry time of 1:56.93. Vasiliev failed to advance into the semifinals, as he placed fifty-seventh overall in the preliminaries.
