= Anas Abu Yousuf =

Qatari swimmer (born 1989)

Anas Abu-Yousuf
Personal information
- Full name: Anas Sameer Abu-Yousuf
- National team: Qatar
- Born: 16 November 1989 (age 36) Doha, Qatar
- Height: 1.81 m (5 ft 11 in)
- Weight: 77 kg (170 lb)

Sport
- Sport: Swimming
- Strokes: Freestyle

Anas Sameer N.H. Abu-Yousuf (Arabic: أنس سمير أبو يوسف; born November 16, 1989) is a Qatari swimmer, who specializes in freestyle events.

Abu-Yousuf was one of the youngest swimmers (aged 14) to compete at the 2004 Summer Olympics in Athens. He qualified for the men's 400 m freestyle by receiving a Universality place from FINA, with an entry time of 4:18.70. Swimming in heat one, he posted a lifetime best of 4:11.99 to pull off a fourth-place effort by exactly 10 seconds behind winner Miguel Molina of the Philippines. Abu-Yousuf failed to reach the top 8 final, as he placed forty-third overall on the first day of preliminaries.
