= Swimming at the 1998 World Aquatics Championships – Women's 200 metre individual medley =

Women's 200 metre individual medley at the 1998 FINA World Championships
- Date: 16 January 1998
- Winning time: 2 minutes 10.88 seconds

Medalists
gold medal	Wu Yanyan	China
silver medal	Chen Yan	China
bronze medal	Martina Moravcová	Slovakia

The finals and the qualifying heats of the women's 200 metre individual medley event at the 1998 World Aquatics Championships were held on Friday 16 January 1998 in Perth, Western Australia.

== A Final ==
Rank	Name	Time
Gold medal	Wu Yanyan (CHN)	2:10.88 CR
Silver medal	Chen Yan (CHN)	2:13.66
Bronze medal	Martina Moravcová (SVK)	2:14.26
4	Yana Klochkova (UKR)	2:15.01
5	Maddy Crippen (USA)	2:16.02
5	Marianne Limpert (CAN)	2:16.02
7	Beatrice Câșlaru (ROM)	2:16.20
8	Elli Overton (AUS)	2:16.74

== B Final ==
Rank	Name	Time
9	Oxana Verevka (RUS)	2:16.29
10	Yasuko Tajima (JPN)	2:17.19
11	Sue Rolph (GBR)	2:17.33
12	Joanne Malar (CAN)	2:17.65
13	Lourdes Becerra (ESP)	2:17.89
14	Nicole Hetzer (GER)	2:18.29
15	Emma Johnson (AUS)	2:19.86
16	Aikaterini Sarakatsani (GRE)	2:22.44

== Qualifying heats ==
Rank	Name	Time
1	Martina Moravcová (SVK)	2:15.67
2	Chen Yan (CHN)	2:15.99
3	Wu Yanyan (CHN)	2:16.19
4	Elli Overton (AUS)	2:16.28
5	Beatrice Câșlaru (ROM)	2:16.76
6	Maddy Crippen (USA)	2:16.78
7	Yana Klochkova (UKR)	2:16.89
8	Marianne Limpert (CAN)	2:16.91
9	Nicole Hetzer (GER)	2:16.96
10	Kristine Quance (USA)	2:17.31
11	Joanne Malar (CAN)	2:17.45
12	Sue Rolph (GBR)	2:17.47
13	Yasuko Tajima (JPN)	2:18.50
14	Oxana Verevka (RUS)	2:18.59
15	Malin Svahnström (SWE)	2:18.96
16	Lourdes Becerra (ESP)	2:18.97
17	Aikaterini Sarakatsani (GRE)	2:19.30
18	Emma Johnson (AUS)	2:19.38
19	Alenka Kejžar (SLO)	2:19.57
20	Lenka Maňhalová (CZE)	2:19.67
21	Hana Černá (CZE)	2:19.75
22	Simona Păduraru (ROM)	2:20.47
23.	Yseult Gervy (BEL)	2:20.94
24	Nicole Zahnd (SUI)	2:20.95
25	Nataša Kejžar (SLO)	2:21.09
26	Julia Russell (RSA)	2:21.36
27	Sabine Herbst (GER)	2:21.41
28	Maria Santos (POR)	2:21.71
29	Ravee Intporn-Udom (THA)	2:22.21

== See also ==
- 1996 Women's Olympic Games 200m Individual Medley (Atlanta)
- 1997 Women's World SC Championships 200m Individual Medley (Gothenburg)
- 1997 Women's European LC Championships 200m Individual Medley (Seville)
- 2000 Women's Olympic Games 200m Individual Medley (Sydney)
