= Swimming at the 1998 World Aquatics Championships – Women's 400 metre individual medley =

Women's 400metre individual medley at the 1998 FINA World Championships
- Date: 12 January 1998
- Winning time: 4 minutes 36.66 seconds

Medalists
gold medal	Chen Yan	China
silver medal	Yana Klochkova	Ukraine
bronze medal	Yasuko Tajima	Japan

The finals and the qualifying heats of the women's 400 metre individual medley event at the 1998 World Aquatics Championships were held on Monday 12 January 1998 in Perth, Western Australia.

== A Final ==
Rank	Name	Time
Gold medal	Chen Yan (CHN)	4:36.66
Silver medal	Yana Klochkova (UKR)	4:38.60
Bronze medal	Yasuko Tajima (JPN)	4:39.45
4	Wu Yanyan (CHN)	4:40.16
5	Kristine Quance (USA)	4:42.01
6	Maddy Crippen (USA)	4:43.45
7	Joanne Malar (CAN)	4:46.91
8	Nadine Neumann (AUS)	4:48.84

== B Final ==
Rank	Name	Time
9	Beatrice Câșlaru (ROM)	4:46.91
10	Nicole Hetzer (GER)	4:46.93
11	Lourdes Becerra (ESP)	4:47.52
12	Hana Černá (CZE)	4:48.86
13	Emma Johnson (AUS)	4:50.99
14	Simona Păduraru (ROM)	4:52.09
15	Mirjana Boševska (MKD)	4:53.43
16	Carolyn Adel (SUR)	4:55.33

== Qualifying heats ==
Rank	Name	Time
1	Chen Yan (CHN)	4:40.72
2	Yasuko Tajima (JPN)	4:41.45
3	Maddy Crippen (USA)	4:42.13
4	Joanne Malar (CAN)	4:44.85
5	Kristine Quance (USA)	4:44.95
6	Nadine Neumann (AUS)	4:45.83
7	Yana Klochkova (UKR)	4:45.94
8	Wu Yanyan (CHN)	4:46.00
9	Beatrice Câșlaru (ROM)	4:46.80
10	Nicole Hetzer (GER)	4:48.64
11	Hana Černá (CZE)	4:48.64
12	Emma Johnson (AUS)	4:49.94
13	Simona Păduraru (ROM)	4:50.11
14	Lourdes Becerra (ESP)	4:50.46
15	Carolyn Adel (SUR)	4:54.30
16	Mirjana Boševska (MKD)	4:55.56
17	Ravee Intporn-Udom (THA)	4:55.92
18	Yseult Gervy (BEL)	4:56.25
19	Sabine Herbst (GER)	4:57.16
20	Oxana Verevka (RUS)	4:57.59
21	Karine Chevrier (CAN)	4:59.22
22	Aikaterini Sarakatsani (GRE)	4:59.88

== See also ==
- 1996 Women's Olympic Games 400m Individual Medley (Atlanta)
- 1997 Women's World SC Championships 400m Individual Medley (Gothenburg)
- 1997 Women's European LC Championships 400m Individual Medley (Seville)
- 2000 Women's Olympic Games 400m Individual Medley (Sydney)
