= Swimming at the 1997 European Aquatics Championships – Women's 200 metre individual medley =

The final of the Women's 200 metres Individual Medley event at the 1997 European Aquatics Championships was held in Saturday 23 August 1997 in Seville, Spain.

== Finals ==
RANK	FINAL A	TIME
	Oxana Verevka (RUS)	2:14.74
	Martina Moravcová (SVK)	2:15.02
	Yana Klochkova (UKR)	2:15.03
4.	Sabine Herbst (GER)	2:15.99
5.	Sue Rolph (GBR)	2:16.56
6.	Beatrice Câșlaru (ROM)	2:17.17
7.	Brigitte Becue (BEL)	2:17.22
8.	Alicja Pęczak (POL)	2:17.42

RANK	FINAL B	TIME
9.	Cathleen Rund (GER)	2:16.89
10.	Lourdes Becerra (ESP)	2:18.06
11.	Hana Černá (CZE)	2:19.03
12.	Britta Vestergaard (DEN)	2:19.05
13.	Maria Carlos Santos (POR)	2:20.46
14.	Cătălina Cășaru (ROM)	2:21.04
15.	Natalia Kozlova (RUS)	2:21.40
16.	Nadège Cliton (FRA)	2:25.82

== Qualifying heats ==
RANK	FINAL A	TIME
1.	Martina Moravcová (SVK)	2:16.57
2.	Sue Rolph (GBR)	2:17.08
3.	Sabine Herbst (GER)	2:17.48
4.	Yana Klochkova (UKR)	2:17.57
5.	Oxana Verevka (RUS)	2:18.01
6.	Alicja Pęczak (POL)	2:18.04
7.	Beatrice Câșlaru (ROM)	2:18.24
8.	Brigitte Becue (BEL)	2:18.28
9.	Hana Černá (CZE)	2:18.58
10.	Cathleen Rund (GER)	2:18.72
11.	Britta Vestergaard (DEN)	2:19.72
12.	Nadège Cliton (FRA)	2:19.77
13.	Lourdes Becerra (ESP)	2:19.88
14.	Cătălina Cășaru (ROM)	2:20.26
15.	Natalia Kozlova (RUS)	2:20.33
16.	Maria Carlos Santos (POR)	2:20.44
17.	Yseult Gervy (BEL)	2:20.54
18.	Minouche Smit (NED)	2:21.15
19.	Madelon Baans (NED)	2:21.24
20.	Nicole Zahnd (SUI)	2:21.30
21.	Aikaterini Sarakatsani (GRE)	2:21.45
22.	Petra Chaves (POR)	2:21.52
23.	Alenka Kejžar (SLO)	2:22.12
24.	Nataša Kejžar (SLO)	2:22.94
25.	Pavla Chrástová (CZE)	2:23.21
26.	Tina Gretlund (DEN)	2:23.31
27.	Samantha Nesbit (GBR)	2:23.90
28.	María Peláez (ESP)	2:24.05
29.	Martina Nemec (AUT)	2:24.12

== See also ==
- 1996 Women's Olympic Games 200m Individual Medley
- 1997 Women's World Championships (SC) 200m Individual Medley
