= Swimming at the 1997 European Aquatics Championships – Women's 400 metre individual medley =

The final of the Women's 400 metres Individual Medley event at the European LC Championships 1997 was held in Tuesday 19 August 1997 in Seville, Spain.

== Finals ==
RANK	FINAL A	TIME
	Michelle Smith (IRL)	4:42.08
	Yana Klochkova (UKR)	4:43.07
	Hana Černá (CZE)	4:44.05
4.	Sabine Herbst (GER)	4:44.87
5.	Oxana Verevka (RUS)	4:47.59
6.	Beatrice Câșlaru (ROM)	4:48.73
7.	Lourdes Becerra (ESP)	4:50.47
8.	Natalya Kozlova (RUS)	4:52.92

RANK	FINAL B	TIME
9.	Cathleen Rund (GER)	4:50.84
10.	Samantha Nesbit (GBR)	4:51.25
11.	Pavla Chrástová (CZE)	4:54.99
12.	Yseult Gervy (BEL)	4:55.70
13.	Aikaterini Sarakatsani (GRE)	4:56.65
14.	Martina Nemec (AUT)	4:56.86
15.	María Bardina (ESP)	4:57.04
16.	Tina Gretlund (DEN)	5:00.76

== Qualifying heats ==
RANK	HEAT RANKINGS	TIME
1.	Yana Klochkova (UKR)	4:47.52
2.	Hana Černá (CZE)	4:47.58
3.	Oxana Verevka (RUS)	4:48.70
4.	Michelle Smith (IRL)	4:48.75
5.	Sabine Herbst (GER)	4:50.45
6.	Lourdes Becerra (ESP)	4:51.19
7.	Beatrice Câșlaru (ROM)	4:52.35
8.	Natalya Kozlova (RUS)	4:54.60
9.	Samantha Nesbit (GBR)	4:54.95
10.	Cathleen Rund (GER)	4:55.53
11.	María Bardina (ESP)	4:55.80
12.	Aikaterini Sarakatsani (GRE)	4:55.82
13.	Pavla Chrástová (CZE)	4:55.95
14.	Britta Vestergaard (DEN)	4:56.02
15.	Tina Gretlund (DEN)	4:56.20
16.	Yseult Gervy (BEL)	4:56.29
17.	Martina Nemec (AUT)	4:59.06
18.	Nadège Cliton (FRA)	5:01.10
19.	Petra Chaves (POR)	5:02.06

== See also ==
- 1996 Women's Olympic Games 400m Individual Medley
- 1997 Women's World Championships (SC) 400m Individual Medley
