= 1998 European Short Course Swimming Championships – Women's 400 metre individual medley =

The finals and the qualifying heats of the Women's 400 metres Individual Medley event at the 1998 European Short Course Swimming Championships were held on the first day of the competition, on Friday 11 December 1998 in Sheffield, England.

== Finals ==
RANK	FINAL	TIME
Gold medal	Hana Černá (CZE)	4:36.03
Silver medal	Nicole Hetzer (GER)	4:36.37
Bronze medal	Lourdes Becerra (ESP)	4:39.56
4.	Rachael Corner (GBR)	4:42.61
5.	Yseult Gervy (BEL)	4:43.12
6.	Mirjana Boševska (MKD)	4:44.72
7.	Ann-Mari Lillejørd (NOR)	4:47.94
7.	Aikaterini Sarakatsani (GRE)	4:47.94

== Qualifying Heats ==
RANK	HEATS RANKING	TIME
1.	Lourdes Becerra (ESP)	4:39.16
2.	Hana Černá (CZE)	4:40.41
3.	Yseult Gervy (BEL)	4:43.22
4.	Rachael Corner (GBR)	4:44.44
5.	Mirjana Boševska (MKD)	4:45.57
6.	Nicole Hetzer (GER)	4:46.11
7.	Aikaterini Sarakatsani (GRE)	4:47.14
8.	Ann-Mari Lillejørd (NOR)	4:48.16
9.	Pavla Chrástová (CZE)	4:48.78
10.	Malin Svahnström (SWE)	4:48.85
11.	Elisenda Pérez (ESP)	4:48.98
12.	Samantha Nesbit (GBR)	4:49.01
13.	Emely Zakrisson (SWE)	4:50.58
14.	Adi Bichman (ISR)	4:50.96
15.	Andrea Gross (SUI)	4:53.65
16.	Tina Gretlund (DEN)	4:53.74
17.	Majorie Distel (FRA)	4:57.30
18.	Annika Mehlhorn (GER)	4:57.85

== See also ==
- 1996 Women's Olympic Games 400m Individual Medley
- 1997 Women's World SC Championships 400m Individual Medley
- 1997 Women's European LC Championships 400m Individual Medley
- 1998 Women's World LC Championships 400m Individual Medley
- 2000 Women's Olympic Games 400m Individual Medley
