= Swimming at the 2000 Summer Olympics – Women's 400 metre individual medley =

Women's 400 metre individual medley at the Games of the XXVII Olympiad
- Venue: Sydney International Aquatic Centre
- Date: September 16, 2000 (heats & final)
- Competitors: 28 from 24 nations
- Winning time: 4:33.59 WR

Medalists
1st place, gold medalist(s)		Yana Klochkova	Ukraine
2nd place, silver medalist(s)		Yasuko Tajima	Japan
3rd place, bronze medalist(s)		Beatrice Câșlaru	Romania

The women's 400 metre individual medley event at the 2000 Summer Olympics took place on 16 September at the Sydney International Aquatic Centre in Sydney, Australia.

Yana Klochkova blasted the world record to become Ukraine's first ever Olympic gold medalist in swimming. She pulled away from the rest of the field to hit the wall first with a blistering time of 4:33.59. Her spectacular swim shattered the previous global standard of 4:34.79, set by China's Chen Yan from the 1997 Chinese City Games in Shanghai, and lopped three seconds off an old, drug-tainted 1980 Olympic record from former East Germany's Petra Schneider. Japan's Yasuko Tajima kept the pressure on all the way and took the silver in 4:35.96. Storming from fifth at the halfway turn, Beatrice Câșlaru raced to bronze with a Romanian record of 4:37.18 on the rear of a dominant breaststroke leg.

For the first time in Olympic history, Kaitlin Sandeno shut out the medal podium for the Americans with a fourth-place time of 4:41.03. Germany's Nicole Hetzer finished fifth in 4:43.56, while Sandeno's teammate Maddy Crippen, swimming outside in lane eight, earned a sixth spot in 4:44.63. Canada's Joanne Malar (4:45.17) and Aussie favorite Jennifer Reilly (4:45.99) rounded out the historic finale.

== Records ==
Prior to this competition, the existing world and Olympic records were as follows.

World record	Chen Yan (CHN)	4:34.79	Shanghai, China	13 October 1997
Olympic record	Petra Schneider (GDR)	4:36.29	Moscow, Soviet Union	26 July 1980

The following new world and Olympic records were set during this competition.

Date	Event	Name	Nationality	Time	Record
16 September	Final	Yana Klochkova	Ukraine	4:33.59	WR

== Results ==
=== Heats ===
Rank	Heat	Lane	Name	Nationality	Time	Notes
1	4	4	Yana Klochkova	Ukraine	4:37.64	Q, NR
2	2	4	Yasuko Tajima	Japan	4:40.35	Q
3	4	5	Kaitlin Sandeno	United States	4:40.89	Q
4	3	5	Beatrice Câșlaru	Romania	4:41.04	Q
5	4	6	Jennifer Reilly	Australia	4:41.51	Q
6	3	4	Joanne Malar	Canada	4:42.65	Q
7	2	5	Nicole Hetzer	Germany	4:43.23	Q
8	4	3	Maddy Crippen	United States	4:44.00	Q
9	3	6	Hana Černá	Czech Republic	4:44.11	
10	2	7	Oxana Verevka	Russia	4:45.07	
11	2	3	Chen Yan	China	4:45.65	
12	2	6	Rachel Harris	Australia	4:46.02	
13	2	2	Helen Norfolk	New Zealand	4:46.42	NR
14	3	7	Lourdes Becerra	Spain	4:47.50	
15	4	7	Federica Biscia	Italy	4:47.56	NR
16	3	2	Sabine Herbst	Germany	4:47.79	
17	2	8	Mirjana Boševska	Macedonia	4:48.08	NR
18	4	2	Yseult Gervy	Belgium	4:48.31	
19	3	3	Liu Yin	China	4:50.33	
20	2	1	Artemis Dafni	Greece	4:53.52	
21	1	4	Georgina Bardach	Argentina	4:54.31	NR
22	3	1	Carolyn Adel	Suriname	4:57.90	
23	4	1	Lee Ji-hyun	South Korea	4:58.94	
24	1	5	Jana Korbasová	Slovakia	4:59.05	
25	4	8	Sia Wai Yen	Malaysia	4:59.18	
26	3	8	Adi Bichman	Israel	5:06.72	
27	1	3	Alexandra Zertsalova	Kyrgyzstan	5:09.03	
28	1	6	Nguyen Thi Huong	Vietnam	5:26.56	

=== Final ===
Rank	Lane	Name	Nationality	Time	Notes
1st place, gold medalist(s)	4	Yana Klochkova	Ukraine	4:33.59	WR
2nd place, silver medalist(s)	5	Yasuko Tajima	Japan	4:35.96	NR
3rd place, bronze medalist(s)	6	Beatrice Câșlaru	Romania	4:37.18	NR
4	3	Kaitlin Sandeno	United States	4:41.03	
5	1	Nicole Hetzer	Germany	4:43.56	
6	8	Maddy Crippen	United States	4:44.63	
7	7	Joanne Malar	Canada	4:45.17	
8	2	Jennifer Reilly	Australia	4:45.99	
