= Swimming at the 2003 World Aquatics Championships – Women's 400 metre individual medley =

Women's 400m I.M. at the 2003 FINA World Aquatics Championships
- Dates: 27 July 2003 (prelims & finals)

Medalists
gold medal	Yana Klochkova	Ukraine
silver medal	Éva Risztov	Hungary
bronze medal	Beatrice Câșlaru	Romania

The Women's 400m Individual Medley event at the 10th FINA World Aquatics Championships swam 27 July 2003 in Barcelona, Spain. Preliminary heats swam in the morning session, with the top-8 finishers advancing to swim again in the Final that evening.

At the start of the event, the World (WR) and Championship (CR) records were:

- WR: 4:33.59 swum by Yana Klochkova (Ukraine) on September 16, 2000 in Sydney, Australia.
- CR: 4:36.10 swum by Petra Schneider (East Germany) on August 1, 1982 in Guayaquil, Ecuador

== Results ==
=== Final ===
Place	Swimmer	Nation	Time	Notes
1	Yana Klochkova	Ukraine	4:36.74	
2	Éva Risztov	Hungary	4:37.39	
3	Beatrice Câșlaru	Romania	4:41.86	
4	Maggie Bowen	USA	4:43.21	
5	Nicole Hetzer	Germany	4:43.32	
6	Diana Remenyi	Hungary	4:45.67	
7	Georgina Bardach	Argentina	4:46.06	
8	Jennifer Reilly	Australia	4:48.11	

=== Preliminaries ===
Rank	Heat+Lane	Swimmer	Nation	Time	Notes
1	H4 L4	Éva Risztov	Hungary	4:42.89	q
2	H4 L5	Nicole Hetzer	Germany	4:43.48	q
3	H5 L4	Yana Klochkova	Ukraine	4:44.14	q
4	H3 L3	Beatrice Câșlaru	Romania	4:44.26	q
5	H4 L3	Diana Remenyi	Hungary	4:44.77	q
6	H4 L2	Georgina Bardach	Argentina	4:45.16	q
7	H5 L5	Jennifer Reilly	Australia	4:45.57	q
8	H3 L5	Maggie Bowen	United States	4:47.08	q
9	H3 L6	Maiko Fujino	Japan	4:47.17	
10	H3 L4	Hui Qi	China	4:47.20	
11	H5 L2	Yana Tolkatcheva	Russia	4:47.72	
12	H4 L6	Tianyi Zhang	China	4:47.84	
13	H2 L6	Otylia Jędrzejczak	Poland	4:48.59	
14	H2 L4	Kirsty Coventry	Zimbabwe	4:48.75	
15	H3 L1	Joanna Maranhão	Brazil	4:49.04	
16	H3 L2	Elizabeth Warden	Canada	4:49.28	
17	H5 L3	Maddy Crippen	United States	4:50.28	
18	H5 L1	Paula Carballido	Spain	4:50.44	
19	H5 L6	Elizabeth Van Welie	New Zealand	4:51.42	
20	H4 L1	Helen Norfolk	New Zealand	4:51.54	
21	H4 L7	Jessica Abbott	Australia	4:52.72	
22	H5 L7	Yana Martynova	Russia	4:53.77	
23	H4 L8	Julie Hjorth-Hansen	Denmark	4:54.30	
24	H3 L8	Inbal Levavi	Israel	4:54.31	
25	H3 L7	Yuliya Pidlisna	Ukraine	4:55.12	
26	H2 L5	Yi Ting Siow	Malaysia	5:01.20	
27	H5 L8	Veronica Massari	Italy	5:01.50	
28	H2 L3	Elisabeth Jarland	Norway	5:02.54	
29	H2 L7	Vanessa Duenas Uribe	Colombia	5:07.33	
30	H2 L8	Richa Mishra	India	5:11.67	
31	H2 L2	Wing Suet Chan	Hong Kong	5:11.69	
32	H2 L1	Sabria Dahane	Algeria	5:15.88	
33	H1 L4	Shrone Austin	Seychelles	5:17.39	
34	H1 L5	Jamie Shufflebarger	Virgin Islands	5:24.89	
35	H1 L3	Susan Anchia	Costa Rica	5:28.37	
36	H1 L6	Ana Galindo	Honduras	5:37.85	
-	-	Jakie Wellman	Zambia	DNS	
