= Swimming at the 2001 World Aquatics Championships – Women's 200 metre individual medley =

Women's 200 metre individual medley at the 2001 FINA World Championships
- Dates: 26 July 2001 (heats, semifinals); 27 July 2001 (final)
- Competitors: 35
- Winning time: 2 minutes 11.93 seconds

Medalists
gold medal	Martha Bowen	United States
silver medal	Yana Klochkova	Ukraine
bronze medal	Qi Hui	China

The women's 200 metre individual medley event at the 2001 World Aquatics Championships took place 26 July. The heats and semifinals took place 25 July, with the final being held on 26 July.

== Records ==
Prior to the competition, the existing world and championship records were as follows:

World record	Wu Yanyan (CHN)	2:09.72	Shanghai, China	17 October 1997
World record	Wu Yanyan (CHN)	2:10.88	Perth, Australia	16 January 1998

== Results ==
=== Heats ===
Rank	Name	Nationality	Time	Notes
1	Yana Klochkova	Ukraine	2:14.07	Q
2	Martha Bowen	United States	2:14.23	Q
3	Annika Mehlhorn	Germany	2:14.88	Q
4	Nicole Hetzer	Germany	2:15.07	Q, WD
4	Lori Munz	Australia	2:15.07	Q
6	Cristina Teuscher	United States	2:15.23	Q
7	Tomoko Hagiwara	Japan	2:15.47	Q
8	Jennifer Reilly	Australia	2:16.15	Q
9	Marianne Limpert	Canada	2:16.16	Q
10	Oxana Verevka	Russia	2:16.70	Q
11	Beatrice Câșlaru	Romania	2:16.79	Q
12	Sara Nordenstam	Sweden	2:17.23	Q
13	Qi Hui	China	2:18.49	Q
14	Miriana Bosevska	North Macedonia	2:18.56	Q
15	Ayane Sato	Japan	2:18.83	Q
16	Georgina Bardach	Argentina	2:19.20	Q
17	Tatiana Rouba	Spain	2:19.39	WD
17	Hinkelien Schreuder	Netherlands	2:19.39	Q
19	Alenka Kejžar	Slovenia	2:19.47	
20	Éva Risztov	Hungary	2:19.99	
21	Hana Netrefová	Czech Republic	2:20.06	
22	Helen Nolfolk	New Zealand	2:21.03	
23	Lára Hrund Bjargardóttir	Iceland	2:22.66	
24	Yi Ting Siow	Malaysia	2:23.02	
25	Wai Yen Sia	Malaysia	2:24.86	
26	Kuan Chia-Hsien	Chinese Taipei	2:28.07	
27	Yang Chin-Kuei	Chinese Taipei	2:29.53	
28	Maria Wong	Peru	2:29.67	
29	Xenavee Pangelinan	Northern Mariana Islands	2:29.84	
30	Ayeisha Collymore	Trinidad and Tobago	2:30.35	
31	Khadisa Ciss	Senegal	2:31.23	
32	Shun Kwan Andrea Chum	Macau	2:35.64	
33	Perla Martinez	Honduras	2:38.26	
34	Weng Lam Cheong	Macau	2:42.07	
35	Lasm Meledje	Ivory Coast	2:45.10	
–	Jennifer Fratesi	Canada	DNS	

=== Semifinals ===
Rank	Name	Nationality	Time	Notes
1	Yana Klochkova	Ukraine	2:13.07	Q
2	Martha Bowen	United States	2:13.55	Q
3	Oxana Verevka	Russia	2:13.56	Q
4	Annika Mehlhorn	Germany	2:14.11	Q
5	Tomoko Hagiwara	Japan	2:14.22	Q
6	Cristina Teuscher	United States	2:14.37	Q
7	Qi Hui	China	2:14.40	Q
8	Beatrice Câșlaru	Romania	2:14.42	Q
9	Marianne Limpert	Canada	2:15.40	
10	Lori Munz	Australia	2:16.10	
11	Jennifer Reilly	Australia	2:16.32	
12	Sara Nordenstam	Sweden	2:17.17	
13	Hinkelien Schreuder	Netherlands	2:17.78	
14	Ayane Sato	Japan	2:18.56	
15	Georgina Bardach	Argentina	2:19.11	
16	Miriana Bosevska	North Macedonia	2:19.22	

=== Final ===
Rank	Name	Nationality	Time	Notes
1st place, gold medalist(s)	Martha Bowen	United States	2:11.93	
2nd place, silver medalist(s)	Yana Klochkova	Ukraine	2:12.30	
3rd place, bronze medalist(s)	Qi Hui	China	2:12.46	
4	Oxana Verevka	Russia	2:13.62	
5	Beatrice Câșlaru	Romania	2:13.78	
6	Cristina Teuscher	United States	2:14.82	
7	Tomoko Hagiwara	Japan	2:14.93	
8	Annika Mehlhorn	Germany	2:15.15	
