= 1997 FINA Short Course World Championships – Women's 400m individual medley =

The qualifying heats and the finals of the women's 400 metres individual medley event at the 1997 FINA Short Course World Championships were held on the first day of the championships, on Thursday 17 April 1997 in Gothenburg, Sweden.

== Finals ==
RANK	FINAL A	TIME
	Emma Johnson (AUS)	4:35.18
	Sabine Herbst (GER)	4:36.02
	Joanne Malar (CAN)	4:37.46
4.	Chen Yan (CHN)	4:39.22
5.	Jennifer Parmenter (USA)	4:39.97
6.	Rachel Harris (AUS)	4:42.27
7.	Carrie Burgoyne (CAN)	4:42.58
8.	Wu Yanyan (CHN)	4:42.99

RANK	FINAL B	TIME
9.	Pavla Chrástová (CZE)	4:42.59
10.	Shelly Ripple (USA)	4:43.98
11.	Nadège Cliton (FRA)	4:48.30
12.	Mirjana Boševska (MKD)	4:49.10
13.	Martina Nemec (AUT)	4:49.32
14.	Dagmar Majerová (CZE)	4:50.47
15.	Amanda Clegg (RSA)	4:52.49
16.	Petra Chaves (POR)	4:54.99

== Qualifying heats ==
RANK	HEATS RANKING	TIME
1.	Sabine Herbst (GER)	4:39.18
2.	Joanne Malar (CAN)	4:39.73
3.	Emma Johnson (AUS)	4:40.20
4.	Jennifer Parmenter (USA)	4:41.32
5.	Chen Yan (CHN)	4:41.89
6.	Wu Yanyan (CHN)	4:42.24
7.	Rachel Harris (AUS)	4:42.43
8.	Carrie Burgoyne (CAN)	4:43.58
9.	Shelly Ripple (USA)	4:45.38
10.	Pavla Chrástová (CZE)	4:46.32
11.	Nadège Cliton (FRA)	4:47.72
12.	Dagmar Majerová (CZE)	4:49.60
13.	Martina Nemec (AUT)	4:50.43
14.	Mirjana Boševska (MKD)	4:52.47
15.	Amanda Clegg (RSA)	4:53.62
16.	Petra Chaves (POR)	4:54.34
17.	Aikaterina Sarakatsani (GRE)	4:54.60
18.	Praphalsai Minpraphal (THA)	4:56.59
19.	Flavia Rigamonti (SUI)	4:56.91
20.	Isabel Ceballos (COL)	4:57.76

== See also ==
- 1996 Women's Olympic Games 400m Individual Medley
- 1997 Women's European LC Championships 400m Individual Medley
