= 2002 Pan Pacific Swimming Championships – Women's 400 metre individual medley =

Women's 400 metre individual medley at the 2002 Pan Pacific Swimming Championships
- Venue: Yokohama International Swimming Pool
- Dates: August 24, 2002 (heats & finals)
- Competitors: 20 from 8 nations
- Winning time: 4:40.84

Medalists
gold medal	Jennifer Reilly	Australia
silver medal	Martha Bowen	United States
bronze medal	Maiko Fujino	Japan

The women's 400 metre individual medley competition at the 2002 Pan Pacific Swimming Championships took place on August 24 at the Yokohama International Swimming Pool. The last champion was Joanne Malar of Canada.

This race consisted of eight lengths of the pool. The first two lengths were swum using the butterfly stroke, the second pair with the backstroke, the third pair of lengths in breaststroke, and the final two were freestyle.

== Records ==
Prior to this competition, the existing world and Pan Pacific records were as follows:

World record	Yana Klochkova (UKR)	4:33.59	Sydney, Australia	September 16, 2000
Pan Pacific Championships record	Kristine Quance (USA)	4:39.25	Kobe, Japan	August 13, 1993

== Results ==
All times are in minutes and seconds.

KEY:	q	Fastest non-qualifiers	Q	Qualified	CR	Championships record	NR	National record	PB	Personal best	SB	Seasonal best

=== Heats ===
The first round was held on August 24.

Rank	Heat	Lane	Name	Nationality	Time	Notes
1	2	4	Jennifer Reilly	Australia	4:44.24	Q
2	3	4	Martha Bowen	United States	4:46.03	Q
3	2	3	Elizabeth Warden	Canada	4:46.38	Q
4	1	4	Madeleine Crippen	United States	4:49.15	Q
5	3	3	Maiko Fujino	Japan	4:49.20	Q
6	2	6	Emily Mason	United States	4:49.85	Q
7	1	3	Jessica Abbott	Australia	4:49.89	Q
8	3	5	Elizabeth Van Welie	New Zealand	4:50.06	Q
9	1	5	Andrea Cassidy	United States	4:50.06	
10	3	6	Sawami Fujita	Japan	4:50.65	
11	2	5	Ayane Sato	Japan	4:52.15	
12	1	2	Dena Durand	Canada	4:53.27	
13	1	7	Joanna Maranhão	Brazil	4:53.50	
14	1	6	Yvette Rodier	Australia	4:53.55	
15	2	2	Kelly Doody	Canada	4:54.05	
16	3	2	Helen Norfolk	New Zealand	4:56.51	
17	2	7	Bárbara Jatobá	Brazil	4:58.20	
18	3	1	Wing Suet Chan	Hong Kong	5:07.03	
19	3	7	Carissa Thompson	New Zealand	5:07.72	
20	2	1	U Nice Chan	Singapore	5:16.17	

=== Final ===
The final was held on August 24.

Rank	Lane	Name	Nationality	Time	Notes
1st place, gold medalist(s)	4	Jennifer Reilly	Australia	4:40.84	
2nd place, silver medalist(s)	5	Martha Bowen	United States	4:44.39	
3rd place, bronze medalist(s)	2	Maiko Fujino	Japan	4:45.79	
4	3	Elizabeth Warden	Canada	4:45.80	
5	8	Sawami Fujita	Japan	4:48.40	
6	1	Elizabeth Van Welie	New Zealand	4:49.95	
7	6	Madeleine Crippen	United States	4:50.49	
8	7	Jessica Abbott	Australia	4:51.59	
