= Swimming at the 2001 World Aquatics Championships – Women's 400 metre individual medley =

Women's 400-metre individual medley at the 2001 FINA World Championships
- Dates: 22 July 2001
- Competitors: 22
- Winning time: 4 minutes 36.98 seconds

Medalists
gold medal	Yana Klochkova	Ukraine
silver medal	Martha Bowen	United States
bronze medal	Beatrice Câșlaru	Romania

The women's 400-metre individual medley event at the 2001 World Aquatic Championships took place 22 July. Both the heats and final were held on 22 July.

== Records ==
Prior to the competition, the existing world and championship records were as follows:

World record	Yana Klochkova (UKR)	4:33.59	Sydney, Australia	16 September 2000
Championship record	Petra Schneider (GDR)	4:36.10	Guayaquil, Ecuador	1 August 1982

== Results ==
=== Heats ===
Rank	Swimmer	Nation	Time	Notes
1	Beatrice Câșlaru	Romania	4:40.36	Q
2	Martha Bowen	United States	4:41.31	Q
3	Nicole Hetzer	Germany	4:41.81	Q
4	Yana Klochkova	Ukraine	4:42.52	Q
5	Kaitlin Sandeno	United States	4:43.88	Q
6	Qi Hui	China	4:44.65	Q
7	Tomoko Hagiwara	Japan	4:45.94	Q
8	Ayane Sato	Japan	4:46.05	Q
9	Jennifer Reilly	Australia	4:46.29	
10	Hana Netrefová	Czech Republic	4:47.46	
11	Oxana Verevka	Russia	4:47.55	
12	Paula Carballido	Spain	4:48.54	
13	Sara Nordenstam	Sweden	4:49.26	
14	Simona Păduraru	Romania	4:49.45	
15	Helen Nolfolr	New Zealand	4:50.60	
16	Georgina Bardach	Argentina	4:52.31	
17	Miriana Bosevska	North Macedonia	4:53.01	
18	Megan McMahon	Australia	4:57.73	
19	Wai Yen Sia	Malaysia	4:57.91	
20	Lin Chi-Chan	Chinese Taipei	5:04.79	
21	Lára Hrund Bjargardóttir	Iceland	5:09.31	
22	Kuan Chia-Hsien	Chinese Taipei	5:11.33	

=== Final ===
Rank	Name	Nationality	Time	Notes
1st place, gold medalist(s)	Yana Klochkova	Ukraine	4:36.98	
2nd place, silver medalist(s)	Martha Bowen	United States	4:39.06	
3rd place, bronze medalist(s)	Beatrice Câșlaru	Romania	4:39.33	
4	Qi Hui	China	4:41.64	
5	Kaitlin Sandeno	United States	4:43.13	
6	Nicole Hetzer	Germany	4:44.77	
7	Tomoko Hagiwara	Japan	4:48.47	
–	Ayane Sato	Japan	DSQ	

Key: WR = World record
