= 1999 Pan Pacific Swimming Championships – Women's 200 metre individual medley =

Women's 200 metre individual medley at the 1999 Pan Pacific Swimming Championships
- Venue: Sydney International Aquatic Centre
- Dates: August 24, 1999 (heats & semifinals); August 25, 1999 (final)
- Competitors: 24 from 8 nations
- Winning time: 2:13.63

Medalists
| gold medal | Joanne Malar | Canada |
| silver medal | Cristina Teuscher | United States |
| bronze medal | Elli Overton | Australia |

The women's 200 metre individual medley competition at the 1999 Pan Pacific Swimming Championships took place on August 24–25 at the Sydney International Aquatic Centre. The last champion was Kristine Quance of US.

This race consisted of four lengths of the pool, one each in backstroke, breaststroke, butterfly and freestyle swimming.

== Records ==
Prior to this competition, the existing world and Pan Pacific records were as follows:

| World record | Wu Yanyan (CHN) | 2:09.72 | Shanghai, China | October 17, 1997 |
| Pan Pacific Championships record | Allison Wagner (USA) | 2:12.54 | Kobe, Japan | August 15, 1993 |

== Results ==
All times are in minutes and seconds.

| KEY: | q | Fastest non-qualifiers | Q | Qualified | CR | Championships record | NR | National record | PB | Personal best | SB | Seasonal best |

=== Heats ===
The first round was held on August 24.

| Rank | Name | Nationality | Time | Notes |
|---|---|---|---|---|
| 1 | Cristina Teuscher | United States | 2:15.64 | Q |
| 2 | Lori Munz | Australia | 2:15.73 | Q |
| 2 | Joanne Malar | Canada | 2:15.73 | Q |
| 4 | Madeleine Crippen | United States | 2:16.15 | Q |
| 5 | Elli Overton | Australia | 2:16.65 | Q |
| 6 | Tomoko Hagiwara | Japan | 2:17.00 | Q |
| 7 | Marianne Limpert | Canada | 2:17.36 | Q |
| 8 | Rachel Harris | Australia | 2:17.84 | Q |
| 9 | Natalie Coughlin | United States | 2:18.16 | Q |
| 10 | Yasuko Tajima | Japan | 2:18.48 | Q |
| 11 | Megan McMahon | Australia | 2:18.52 | Q |
| 12 | Emma Johnson | Australia | 2:18.76 | |
| 13 | Elizabeth Van Welie | New Zealand | 2:18.94 | Q |
| 14 | Elizabeth Warden | Canada | 2:19.06 | Q |
| 15 | Helen Norfolk | New Zealand | 2:19.20 | Q |
| 16 | Jennifer Reilly | Australia | 2:20.40 | |
| 17 | Miyuki Ishikawa | Japan | 2:20.48 | Q |
| 18 | Kristen Bradley | Canada | 2:20.53 | Q |
| 19 | Nadine Neumann | Australia | 2:21.08 | |
| 20 | Amanda Loots | South Africa | 2:22.45 | |
| 21 | Carissa Thompson | New Zealand | 2:24.49 | |
| 22 | Sia Wai Yen | Malaysia | 2:26.89 | |
| 23 | Kuan Chia-hsien | Chinese Taipei | 2:28.30 | |
| 24 | Sung Yi-chieh | Chinese Taipei | 2:30.66 | |

=== Semifinals ===
The semifinals were held on August 24.

| Rank | Name | Nationality | Time | Notes |
|---|---|---|---|---|
| 1 | Joanne Malar | Canada | 2:13.95 | Q, CWR |
| 2 | Tomoko Hagiwara | Japan | 2:14.79 | Q |
| 3 | Cristina Teuscher | United States | 2:15.11 | Q |
| 4 | Madeleine Crippen | United States | 2:15.33 | Q |
| 5 | Marianne Limpert | Canada | 2:15.76 | Q |
| 6 | Elli Overton | Australia | 2:16.24 | Q |
| 7 | Lori Munz | Australia | 2:16.61 | Q |
| 8 | Natalie Coughlin | United States | 2:16.68 | |
| 9 | Yasuko Tajima | Japan | 2:17.39 | Q |
| 10 | Helen Norfolk | New Zealand | 2:18.06 | |
| 11 | Rachel Harris | Australia | 2:18.58 | |
| 12 | Megan McMahon | Australia | 2:18.72 | |
| 13 | Miyuki Ishikawa | Japan | 2:19.43 | |
| 14 | Elizabeth Warden | Canada | 2:19.90 | |
| 15 | Elizabeth Van Welie | New Zealand | 2:20.29 | |
| 16 | Kristen Bradley | Canada | 2:20.37 | |

=== Final ===
The final was held on August 25.

| Rank | Lane | Nationality | Time | Notes |
|---|---|---|---|---|
| 1st place, gold medalist(s) | Joanne Malar | Canada | 2:13.63 | CWR |
| 2nd place, silver medalist(s) | Cristina Teuscher | United States | 2:14.31 | |
| 3rd place, bronze medalist(s) | Elli Overton | Australia | 2:14.51 | |
| 4 | Tomoko Hagiwara | Japan | 2:14.70 | |
| 5 | Marianne Limpert | Canada | 2:15.77 | |
| 6 | Lori Munz | Australia | 2:16.85 | |
| 7 | Madeleine Crippen | United States | 2:16.96 | |
| 8 | Yasuko Tajima | Japan | 2:18.44 | |
