= 1999 Pan Pacific Swimming Championships – Women's 400 metre individual medley =

Women's 400 metre individual medley at the 1999 Pan Pacific Swimming Championships
- Venue: Sydney International Aquatic Centre
- Dates: August 22, 1999 (heats & finals)
- Competitors: 21 from 8 nations
- Winning time: 4:40.23

Medalists
gold medal	Joanne Malar	Canada
silver medal	Yasuko Tajima	Japan
bronze medal	Cristina Teuscher	United States

The women's 400 metre individual medley competition at the 1999 Pan Pacific Swimming Championships took place on August 22 at the Sydney International Aquatic Centre. The last champion was Kristine Quance of US.

This race consisted of eight lengths of the pool. The first two lengths were swum using the butterfly stroke, the second pair with the backstroke, the third pair of lengths in breaststroke, and the final two were freestyle.

== Records ==
Prior to this competition, the existing world and Pan Pacific records were as follows:

World record	Chen Yan (CHN)	4:34.79	Shanghai, China	October 13, 1997
Pan Pacific Championships record	Kristine Quance (USA)	4:39.25	Kobe, Japan	August 13, 1993

== Results ==
All times are in minutes and seconds.

KEY:	q	Fastest non-qualifiers	Q	Qualified	CR	Championships record	NR	National record	PB	Personal best	SB	Seasonal best

=== Heats ===
The first round was held on August 22.

Rank	Name	Nationality	Time	Notes
1	Madeleine Crippen	United States	4:43.13	Q
2	Joanne Malar	Canada	4:44.76	Q
3	Yasuko Tajima	Japan	4:45.07	Q
4	Cristina Teuscher	United States	4:45.77	Q
5	Jennifer Reilly	Australia	4:46.63	Q
6	Elli Overton	Australia	4:48.06	Q
7	Helen Norfolk	New Zealand	4:48.55	Q
8	Emma Johnson	Australia	4:49.23	
9	Rachel Harris	Australia	4:50.44	
10	Elizabeth Van Welie	New Zealand	4:50.58	Q
11	Miyuki Ishikawa	Japan	4:50.64	
12	Elizabeth Warden	Canada	4:52.94	
13	Catherine Street	United States	4:53.22	
14	Charlene Benzie	Australia	4:54.31	
15	Amanda Loots	South Africa	4:55.37	
16	Jacinta van Lint	Australia	4:55.82	
17	Natalie du Toit	South Africa	4:58.40	
18	Kristen Bradley	Canada	5:00.19	
19	Kuan Chia-hsien	Chinese Taipei	5:06.82	
20	Carissa Thompson	New Zealand	5:08.20	
21	Sia Wai Yen	Malaysia	5:08.61	

=== Final ===
The final was held on August 22.

Rank	Lane	Nationality	Time	Notes
1st place, gold medalist(s)	Joanne Malar	Canada	4:40.23	
2nd place, silver medalist(s)	Yasuko Tajima	Japan	4:40.56	
3rd place, bronze medalist(s)	Cristina Teuscher	United States	4:41.21	
4	Madeleine Crippen	United States	4:41.30	
5	Jennifer Reilly	Australia	4:46.06	
6	Elli Overton	Australia	4:46.44	
7	Helen Norfolk	New Zealand	4:47.46	
8	Elizabeth Van Welie	New Zealand	4:52.61	
