= Swimming at the 1996 Summer Olympics – Women's 400 metre individual medley =

Women's 400 metre individual medley at the Games of the XXVI Olympiad
- Venue: Georgia Tech Aquatic Center
- Date: 20 July 1996 (heats & finals)
- Competitors: 31 from 24 nations
- Winning time: 4:39.18 NR

Medalists
| 1st place, gold medalist(s) | | Michelle Smith | Ireland |
| 2nd place, silver medalist(s) | | Allison Wagner | United States |
| 3rd place, bronze medalist(s) | | Krisztina Egerszegi | Hungary |

The women's 400 metre individual medley event at the 1996 Summer Olympics took place on 20 July at the Georgia Tech Aquatic Center in Atlanta, United States.

== Records ==
Prior to this competition, the existing world and Olympic records were as follows.

| World record | Petra Schneider (GDR) | 4:36.10 | Guayaquil, Ecuador | 1 August 1982 |
| Olympic record | Petra Schneider (GDR) | 4:36.29 | Moscow, Soviet Union | 26 July 1980 |

== Results ==
=== Heats ===
Rule: The eight fastest swimmers advance to final A (Q), while the next eight to final B (q).

| Rank | Heat | Lane | Name | Nationality | Time | Notes |
|---|---|---|---|---|---|---|
| 1 | 4 | 4 | Krisztina Egerszegi | Hungary | 4:43.09 | Q |
| 2 | 4 | 3 | Emma Johnson | Australia | 4:43.45 | Q |
| 3 | 3 | 5 | Michelle Smith | Ireland | 4:43.79 | Q |
| 4 | 4 | 5 | Allison Wagner | United States | 4:44.06 | Q |
| 5 | 4 | 1 | Beatrice Câșlaru | Romania | 4:44.66 | Q |
| 6 | 3 | 2 | Whitney Metzler | United States | 4:44.74 | Q |
| 7 | 2 | 3 | Sabine Herbst | Germany | 4:45.36 | Q |
| 8 | 2 | 7 | Lourdes Becerra | Spain | 4:45.54 | Q, NR |
| 9 | 2 | 5 | Joanne Malar | Canada | 4:47.85 | q |
| 10 | 3 | 3 | Fumie Kurotori | Japan | 4:48.51 | q |
| 11 | 4 | 7 | Nancy Sweetnam | Canada | 4:48.56 | q |
| 12 | 3 | 7 | Hideko Hiranaka | Japan | 4:49.32 | q |
| 13 | 4 | 2 | Hana Černá | Czech Republic | 4:49.43 | q, NR |
| 14 | 2 | 6 | Elli Overton | Australia | 4:49.82 | q |
| 15 | 3 | 1 | Pavla Chrástová | Czech Republic | 4:51.35 | q |
| 16 | 1 | 4 | Yseult Gervy | Belgium | 4:53.11 | q, NR |
| 17 | 3 | 4 | Chen Yan | China | 4:53.87 | |
| 18 | 2 | 4 | Wu Yanyan | China | 4:54.07 | |
| 19 | 4 | 8 | Sarah Hardcastle | Great Britain | 4:54.64 | |
| 20 | 3 | 8 | Britta Vestergaard | Denmark | 4:55.03 | |
| 21 | 3 | 6 | Cathleen Rund | Germany | 4:55.30 | |
| 22 | 1 | 7 | Carolyn Adel | Suriname | 4:55.48 | NR |
| 23 | 1 | 5 | Mirjana Boševska | Macedonia | 4:55.57 | |
| 24 | 2 | 2 | Anna Wilson | New Zealand | 4:55.72 | |
| 25 | 1 | 1 | Aikaterini Sarakatsani | Greece | 4:56.32 | NR |
| 26 | 4 | 6 | Darya Shmeleva | Russia | 4:57.06 | |
| 27 | 1 | 3 | Praphalsai Minpraphal | Thailand | 4:58.33 | |
| 28 | 1 | 2 | Lee Ji-hyun | South Korea | 4:59.52 | |
| 29 | 1 | 6 | Hsieh Shu-tzu | Chinese Taipei | 5:01.70 | |
| 30 | 2 | 8 | Martina Nemec | Austria | 5:02.52 | |
| 31 | 2 | 1 | Nadège Cliton | France | 5:06.46 | |

=== Finals ===
==== Final B ====
| Rank | Lane | Name | Nationality | Time | Notes |
|---|---|---|---|---|---|
| 9 | 4 | Joanne Malar | Canada | 4:46.34 | |
| 10 | 2 | Hana Černá | Czech Republic | 4:46.78 | NR |
| 11 | 3 | Nancy Sweetnam | Canada | 4:47.55 | |
| 12 | 5 | Fumie Kurotori | Japan | 4:47.98 | |
| 13 | 6 | Hideko Hiranaka | Japan | 4:48.72 | |
| 14 | 7 | Elli Overton | Australia | 4:50.73 | |
| 15 | 8 | Yseult Gervy | Belgium | 4:52.89 | |
| 16 | 1 | Pavla Chrástová | Czech Republic | 4:56.23 | |

==== Final A ====
| Rank | Lane | Name | Nationality | Time | Notes |
|---|---|---|---|---|---|
| 1st place, gold medalist(s) | 3 | Michelle Smith | Ireland | 4:39.18 | NR |
| 2nd place, silver medalist(s) | 6 | Allison Wagner | United States | 4:42.03 | |
| 3rd place, bronze medalist(s) | 4 | Krisztina Egerszegi | Hungary | 4:42.53 | |
| 4 | 1 | Sabine Herbst | Germany | 4:43.78 | |
| 5 | 5 | Emma Johnson | Australia | 4:44.02 | |
| 6 | 2 | Beatrice Câșlaru | Romania | 4:44.91 | |
| 7 | 8 | Lourdes Becerra | Spain | 4:45.17 | NR |
| 8 | 7 | Whitney Metzler | United States | 4:46.20 | |
