= 1997 FINA Short Course World Championships – Women's 200m individual medley =

The finals and the qualifying heats of the women's 200 metres individual medley event at the 1997 FINA Short Course World Championships were held on the last day of the championships, on Sunday 20 April 1997 in Gothenburg, Sweden.

== Finals ==
RANK	FINAL A	TIME
	Louise Karlsson (SWE)	2:11.19
	Martina Moravcová (SVK)	2:11.39
	Sue Rolph (GBR)	2:12.39
4.	Sabine Herbst (GER)	2:12.72
5.	Britta Vestergaard (DEN)	2:13.04
6.	Rachel Harris (AUS)	2:13.15
7.	Alicja Pęczak (POL)	2:13.70
8.	Wu Yanyan (CHN)	2:14.01

RANK	FINAL B	TIME
9.	Joanne Malar (CAN)	2:13.79
10.	Jennifer Parmenter (USA)	2:14.18
11.	Chen Yan (CHN)	2:14.73
12.	Angela Kennedy (AUS)	2:15.32
13.	Shelly Ripple (USA)	2:15.44
14.	Katrin Jäke (GER)	2:15.93
15.	Julia Russell (RSA)	2:17.27
16.	Carrie Burgoyne (CAN)	2:17.32

== Qualifying heats ==
RANK	HEATS RANKING	TIME
1.	Louise Karlsson (SWE)	2:11.42
2.	Martina Moravcová (SVK)	2:12.62
3.	Britta Vestergaard (DEN)	2:13.16
4.	Alicja Pęczak (POL)	2:13.21
5.	Sabine Herbst (GER)	2:13.28
6.	Sue Rolph (GBR)	2:13.31
7.	Wu Yanyan (CHN)	2:13.53
8.	Rachel Harris (AUS)	2:13.86
9.	Chen Yan (CHN)	2:15.02
10.	Angela Kennedy (AUS)	2:15.08
11.	Julia Russell (RSA)	2:15.15
12.	Jennifer Parmenter (USA)	2:15.18
13.	Joanne Malar (CAN)	2:15.30
14.	Shelly Ripple (USA)	2:16.42
15.	Katrin Jäke (GER)	2:16.60
16.	Carrie Burgoyne (CAN)	2:16.70
17.	Nataša Kejžar (SLO)	2:16.74
18.	Hitomi Kashima (JPN)	2:16.91
19.	Malin Svahnström (SWE)	2:17.26
20.	María Santos (POR)	2:17.51
21.	Pavla Chrástová (CZE)	2:17.57
22.	Amanda Clegg (RSA)	2:19.22
23.	Praphalsai Minpraphal (THA)	2:19.81
24.	Aikaterina Sarakatsani (GRE)	2:20.06
25.	Dagmar Majerová (CZE)	2:20.26
26.	Mirjana Boševska (MKD)	2:20.36
27.	Martina Nemec (AUT)	2:20.86
28.	Isabel Ceballos (COL)	2:21.46
29.	Petra Chaves (POR)	2:21.57
30.	Daniela Hornaková (SVK)	2:21.60

== See also ==
- 1996 Women's Olympic Games 200m Individual Medley
- 1997 Women's European LC Championships 200m Individual Medley
