= 2002 Pan Pacific Swimming Championships – Women's 200 metre individual medley =

Women's 200 metre individual medley at the 2002 Pan Pacific Swimming Championships
- Venue: Yokohama International Swimming Pool
- Dates: August 25, 2002 (heats & semifinals); August 26, 2002 (final)
- Competitors: 25 from 8 nations
- Winning time: 2:13.42

Medalists
gold medal	Tomoko Hagiwara	Japan
silver medal	Gabrielle Rose	United States
bronze medal	Maggie Bowen	United States

The women's 200 metre individual medley competition at the 2002 Pan Pacific Swimming Championships took place on August 25–26 at the Yokohama International Swimming Pool. The last champion was Joanne Malar of Canada.

This race consisted of four lengths of the pool, one each in backstroke, breaststroke, butterfly and freestyle swimming.

== Records ==
Prior to this competition, the existing world and Pan Pacific records were as follows:

World record	Wu Yanyan (CHN)	2:09.72	Shanghai, China	October 17, 1997
Pan Pacific Championships record	Allison Wagner (USA)	2:12.54	Kobe, Japan	August 15, 1993

== Results ==
All times are in minutes and seconds.

KEY:	q	Fastest non-qualifiers	Q	Qualified	CR	Championships record	NR	National record	PB	Personal best	SB	Seasonal best

=== Heats ===
The first round was held on August 25.

Rank	Heat	Lane	Name	Nationality	Time	Notes
1	3	4	Tomoko Hagiwara	Japan	2:15.51	Q
2	2	4	Gabrielle Rose	United States	2:15.89	Q
3	3	6	Corrie Clark	United States	2:16.02	Q
4	2	5	Elizabeth Warden	Canada	2:17.25	Q
5	4	4	Martha Bowen	United States	2:17.47	Q
6	4	5	Zhou Yafei	China	2:17.48	Q
7	3	3	Alice Mills	Australia	2:18.07	Q
8	3	2	Sawami Fujita	Japan	2:18.23	Q
9	4	3	Kristy Cameron	Canada	2:18.51	Q
10	2	3	Jessica Abbott	Australia	2:18.71	Q
11	3	5	Jennifer Reilly	Australia	2:18.96	Q
12	4	6	Madeleine Crippen	United States	2:20.25	Q
13	4	1	Kelly Doody	Canada	2:20.31	Q
14	4	2	Joscelin Yeo	Singapore	2:20.33	Q
15	3	8	Joanna Maranhão	Brazil	2:20.35	Q
16	4	8	Andrea Cassidy	United States	2:20.40	Q
17	2	2	Yvette Rodier	Australia	2:20.52	
18	3	7	Maiko Fujino	Japan	2:20.59	
19	2	7	Ayane Sato	Japan	2:20.93	
20	2	1	Dena Durand	Canada	2:21.24	
21	4	7	Helen Norfolk	New Zealand	2:21.41	
22	2	6	Elizabeth Van Welie	New Zealand	2:21.61	
23	1	5	Jane Copland	New Zealand	2:25.15	
24	1	4	Carissa Thompson	New Zealand	2:25.48	
25	1	6	Tse May Heng	Singapore	2:29.55	
-	1	3	Jenny Guerrero	Philippines	DNS	
-	2	8	Brooke Hanson	Australia	DNS	
-	3	1	Amanda Beard	United States	DNS	

=== Semifinals ===
The semifinals were held on August 25.

Rank	Name	Nationality	Time	Notes
1	Tomoko Hagiwara	Japan	2:14.23	Q
2	Martha Bowen	United States	2:14.31	Q
3	Gabrielle Rose	United States	2:14.95	Q
4	Elizabeth Warden	Canada	2:15.70	Q
5	Jennifer Reilly	Australia	2:16.34	Q
6	Alice Mills	Australia	2:16.36	Q
7	Corrie Clark	United States	2:17.53	Q
8	Zhou Yafei	China	2:17.61	Q
9	Jessica Abbott	Australia	2:17.63	
10	Kristy Cameron	Canada	2:18.72	
11	Sawami Fujita	Japan	2:18.96	
12	Kelly Doody	Canada	2:20.07	
13	Yvette Rodier	Australia	2:20.78	
14	Madeleine Crippen	United States	2:20.88	
15	Joanna Maranhão	Brazil	2:20.97	
16	Joscelin Yeo	Singapore	2:21.30	

=== Final ===
The final was held on August 26.

Rank	Lane	Name	Nationality	Time	Notes
1st place, gold medalist(s)	4	Tomoko Hagiwara	Japan	2:13.42	
2nd place, silver medalist(s)	3	Gabrielle Rose	United States	2:13.93	
3rd place, bronze medalist(s)	5	Maggie Bowen	United States	2:14.28	
4	1	Zhou Yafei	China	2:16.23	
5	7	Alice Mills	Australia	2:16.51	
6	6	Elizabeth Warden	Canada	2:16.99	
7	2	Jennifer Reilly	Australia	2:18.70	
8	8	Kristy Cameron	Canada	2:18.72	
