= Swimming at the 2002 Commonwealth Games – Women's 200 metre individual medley =

Women's 200 metre individual medley at the 2002 Commonwealth Games
- Venue: Manchester Aquatics Centre
- Dates: 30 July 2002
- Competitors: 19 from 13 nations
- Winning time: 2:14.53

Medalists
gold medal	Kirsty Coventry	Zimbabwe
silver medal	Jennifer Reilly	Australia
bronze medal	Marianne Limpert	Canada

The women's 200 metres individual medley event at the 2002 Commonwealth Games was held on 30 July at the Manchester Aquatics Centre.

== Results ==
=== Heats ===
Rank	Heat	Lane	Name	Nationality	Time	Notes
1	2	4	Jennifer Reilly	Australia	2:15.54	Q
2	3	4	Elizabeth Warden	Canada	2:16.16	Q
3	1	4	Marianne Limpert	Canada	2:16.73	Q
4	2	6	Joscelin Yeo	Singapore	2:17.28	Q
5	2	3	Alice Mills	Australia	2:17.34	Q
6	1	3	Elizabeth van Welie	New Zealand	2:17.46	Q
7	1	5	Jessica Abbott	Australia	2:17.50	Q
8	3	5	Kirsty Coventry	Zimbabwe	2:18.08	Q
9	2	5	Kristy Cameron	Canada	2:19.28	
10	3	3	Kathryn Evans	England	2:19.83	
11	3	6	Jo Mullins	England	2:20.43	
12	1	6	Holly Fox	England	2:20.71	
13	3	7	Natalie Bree	Jersey	2:21.40	
14	1	2	Gemma Howells	Wales	2:21.45	
15	2	2	Siow Yi Ting	Malaysia	2:23.83	
16	2	7	Emily Crookall-Nixon	Isle of Man	2:27.39	
17	1	7	Gail Strobridge	Guernsey	2:27.88	
18	3	1	Linda McEachrane	Trinidad and Tobago	2:31.97	
—	3	2	Mandy Loots	South Africa	DNS	

=== Final ===
Rank	Lane	Name	Nationality	Time	Notes
1st place, gold medalist(s)	8	Kirsty Coventry	Zimbabwe	2:14.53	GR
2nd place, silver medalist(s)	4	Jennifer Reilly	Australia	2:14.99	
3rd place, bronze medalist(s)	3	Marianne Limpert	Canada	2:15.07	
4	5	Elizabeth Warden	Canada	2:16.12	
5	2	Alice Mills	Australia	2:16.35	
6	1	Jessica Abbott	Australia	2:17.00	
7	7	Elizabeth van Welie	New Zealand	2:17.04	
8	6	Joscelin Yeo	Singapore	2:17.13	
