= Swimming at the 2002 Commonwealth Games – Women's 400 metre individual medley =

Women's 400 metre individual medley at the 2002 Commonwealth Games
- Venue: Manchester Aquatics Centre
- Dates: 4 August
- Competitors: 15 from 10 nations
- Winning time: 4:43.59

Medalists
| gold medal | Jennifer Reilly | Australia |
| silver medal | Elizabeth Van Welie | New Zealand |
| bronze medal | Jessica Abbott | Australia |

The women's 400 metre individual medley event at the 2002 Commonwealth Games as part of the swimming programme took place on 4 August at the Manchester Aquatics Centre in Manchester, England.

== Records ==
Prior to this competition, the existing world and games records were as follows.

| World record | (Ukraine) Yana Klochkova | 4:33.59 | Sydney, Australia | 16 September 2000 |
| Games record | (Australia) Hayley Lewis | 4:42.65 | Auckland, New Zealand | 25 January 1990 |

== Schedule ==
The schedule was as follows:

All times are local time

| Date | Time | Round |
|---|---|---|
| Sunday 4 August | 10:32 | Heats |
| Sunday 4 August | 18:05 | Final |

== Results ==
=== Heats ===
The 8 fastest swimmers in the heats qualified for the final.

| Rank | Heat | Lane | Name | Nationality | Time | Notes |
|---|---|---|---|---|---|---|
| 1 | 2 | 4 | Jennifer Reilly | Australia | 4:44.57 | Q |
| 2 | 1 | 5 | Elizabeth Van Welie | New Zealand | 4:47.82 | Q |
| 3 | 2 | 5 | Yvette Rodier | Australia | 4:49.34 | Q |
| 4 | 2 | 6 | Rebecca Cooke | England | 4:50.60 | Q |
| 5 | 1 | 4 | Elizabeth Warden | Canada | 4:50.96 | Q |
| 6 | 1 | 3 | Jessica Abbott | Australia | 4:51.25 | Q |
| 7 | 2 | 2 | Mandy Loots | South Africa | 4:53.46 | Q |
| 8 | 1 | 6 | Dena Durand | Canada | 4:54.92 | Q |
| 9 | 2 | 3 | Holly Fox | England | 4:54.96 | |
| 10 | 1 | 2 | Gemma Mary Howells | Wales | 4:57.67 | |
| 11 | 2 | 7 | Kristy Cameron | Canada | 5:00.05 | |
| 12 | 1 | 7 | Natalie Bree | Jersey | 5:03.01 | |
| 13 | 2 | 8 | Gail Strobridge | Guernsey | 5:11.26 | |
| 14 | 2 | 1 | Emily Crookall-Nixon | Isle of Man | 5:16.14 | |
| 15 | 1 | 1 | Heather Roffey | Cayman Islands | 5:20.04 | |

=== Final ===
The final was held on 4 August at 18:05.

Mandy Loots did not participate in the final despite qualifying, and so Holly Fox took the spot instead.

| Rank | Lane | Name | Nationality | Time | Notes |
|---|---|---|---|---|---|
| 1st place, gold medalist(s) | 4 | Jennifer Reilly | Australia | 4:43.59 | |
| 2nd place, silver medalist(s) | 5 | Elizabeth Van Welie | New Zealand | 4:44.56 | |
| 3rd place, bronze medalist(s) | 7 | Jessica Abbott | Australia | 4:47.11 | |
| 4 | 2 | Elizabeth Warden | Canada | 4:47.23 | |
| 4 | 6 | Rebecca Cooke | England | 4:47.23 | |
| 6 | 3 | Yvette Rodier | Australia | 4:52.29 | |
| 7 | 8 | Holly Fox | England | 4:54.06 | |
| 8 | 1 | Dena Durand | Canada | 4:54.22 | |
