= Swimming at the 1998 Asian Games – Women's 200 metre individual medley =

Women's 200 metre individual medley at the 1998 Asian Games
- Venue: Thammasat Aquatic Center
- Date: 11 December 1998
- Competitors: 21 from 14 nations

Medalists
gold medal	Wu Yanyan	China
silver medal	Chen Yan	China
bronze medal	Cho Hee-yeon	South Korea

The women's 200 metre individual medley swimming at the 1998 Asian Games in Bangkok was held on 11 December at the Thammasat Aquatic Center.

== Schedule ==
All times are Indochina Time (UTC+07:00)

Date	Time	Event
Friday, 11 December 1998	09:00	Heats
Friday, 11 December 1998	18:00	Final

== Results ==
Legend

- DNS — Did not start

=== Heats ===
Rank	Heat	Athlete	Time	Notes
1	1	Yasuko Tajima (JPN)	2:18.54	
2	2	Chen Yan (CHN)	2:19.76	
3	3	Cho Hee-yeon (KOR)	2:20.21	
4	2	Miyuki Ishikawa (JPN)	2:21.21	
5	3	Wu Yanyan (CHN)	2:22.38	
6	1	May Ooi (SIN)	2:23.77	
7	3	Lee Ji-hyun (KOR)	2:24.45	
8	2	Sherry Tsai (HKG)	2:26.54	Withdrew
9	3	Kuan Chia-hsien (TPE)	2:27.08	Advanced
10	1	Duangruthai Thammaphanya (THA)	2:28.60	
11	2	Lizza Danila (PHI)	2:29.14	
12	1	Pamela Tung (HKG)	2:30.24	
13	2	Chiang Tzu-ying (TPE)	2:30.48	
14	3	Kathy Echiverri (PHI)	2:30.86	
15	3	Saida Iskandarova (UZB)	2:33.66	
16	1	Rola El-Haress (LIB)	2:34.55	
17	2	Richa Mishra (IND)	2:36.96	
18	1	Nguyễn Thị Hương (VIE)	2:38.07	
—	1	Hem Raksmey (CAM)	DNS	
—	2	Natasha Kodituwakku (SRI)	DNS	
—	3	Praphalsai Minpraphal (THA)	DNS	

=== Final ===
Rank	Athlete	Time	Notes
1st place, gold medalist(s)	Wu Yanyan (CHN)	2:15.12	
2nd place, silver medalist(s)	Chen Yan (CHN)	2:15.54	
3rd place, bronze medalist(s)	Cho Hee-yeon (KOR)	2:15.95	
4	Yasuko Tajima (JPN)	2:16.30	
5	Miyuki Ishikawa (JPN)	2:18.33	
6	Lee Ji-hyun (KOR)	2:21.24	
7	May Ooi (SIN)	2:24.88	
8	Kuan Chia-hsien (TPE)	2:26.51	
