= Swimming at the 1998 Asian Games – Women's 400 metre individual medley =

Women's 400 metre individual medley at the 1998 Asian Games
- Venue: Thammasat Aquatic Center
- Date: 7 December 1998
- Competitors: 13 from 10 nations

Medalists
gold medal	Yasuko Tajima	Japan
silver medal	Wu Yanyan	China
bronze medal	Chen Yan	China

The women's 400 metre individual medley swimming at the 1998 Asian Games in Bangkok was held on 7 December at the Thammasat Aquatic Center.

== Schedule ==
All times are Indochina Time (UTC+07:00)

Date	Time	Event
Monday, 7 December 1998	09:00	Heats
Monday, 7 December 1998	18:00	Final

== Results ==
=== Heats ===
Rank	Heat	Athlete	Time	Notes
1	2	Yasuko Tajima (JPN)	4:46.91	
2	1	Miyuki Ishikawa (JPN)	4:51.67	
3	2	Chen Yan (CHN)	4:53.71	
4	2	Lee Ji-hyun (KOR)	4:56.49	
5	1	Wu Yanyan (CHN)	5:03.39	
6	1	Kuan Chia-hsien (TPE)	5:04.06	
7	1	Duangruthai Thammaphanya (THA)	5:06.97	
8	1	Lizza Danila (PHI)	5:07.29	
9	2	Sherry Tsai (HKG)	5:14.47	
10	2	K. Khantidilokvongsa (THA)	5:18.71	
11	1	Saida Iskandarova (UZB)	5:25.41	
12	2	Nguyễn Thị Hương (VIE)	5:31.38	
13	2	Rola El-Haress (LIB)	5:35.18	

=== Final ===
Rank	Athlete	Time	Notes
1st place, gold medalist(s)	Yasuko Tajima (JPN)	4:39.92	
2nd place, silver medalist(s)	Wu Yanyan (CHN)	4:46.74	
3rd place, bronze medalist(s)	Chen Yan (CHN)	4:47.34	
4	Miyuki Ishikawa (JPN)	4:47.47	
5	Lee Ji-hyun (KOR)	4:52.85	
6	Duangruthai Thammaphanya (THA)	5:07.53	
7	Lizza Danila (PHI)	5:08.38	
8	Kuan Chia-hsien (TPE)	5:11.20	
