= Ramon Klenz =

German swimmer

Personal information
- Nationality: German
- Born: 2 August 1998 (age 28)
- Height: 1.90 m (6 ft 3 in)
- Weight: 95 kg (209 lb)

Sport
- Sport: Swimming
Medal record
European Championships (SC)
Silver medal – second place	2019 Glasgow	200 m butterfly

Ramon Klenz (born 2 August 1998) is a German swimmer. He is known for breaking the German 200m butterfly record previously held by Michael Groß for 32 years. Ramon Klenz currently swims at ONEflow Aquatics in Neckarsulm, Germany, under the coaching of Matt Magee.

He is the son of retired German Olympic swimmer Sabine Herbst-Klenz, the nephew of swimmer Stefan Herbst, and the grandson of Eva Wittke and Jochen Herbst, also Olympic swimmers.

He competed in the men's 200 metre butterfly event at the 2018 FINA World Swimming Championships (25 m), in Hangzhou, China.
