= 2002 Pan Pacific Swimming Championships – Women's 200 metre butterfly =

Women's 200 metre butterfly at the 2002 Pan Pacific Swimming Championships
- Venue: Yokohama International Swimming Pool
- Dates: August 26, 2002 (heats & semifinals); August 27, 2002 (final)
- Competitors: 30 from 9 nations
- Winning time: 2:08.31

Medalists
gold medal	Petria Thomas	Australia
silver medal	Mary Descenza	United States
bronze medal	Emily Mason	United States

The women's 200 metre butterfly competition at the 2002 Pan Pacific Swimming Championships took place on August 26–27 at the Yokohama International Swimming Pool. The last champion was Susie O'Neill of Australia.

This race consisted of four lengths of the pool, all lengths being in butterfly stroke.

== Records ==
Prior to this competition, the existing world and Pan Pacific records were as follows:

World record	Otylia Jędrzejczak (POL)	2:05.78	Berlin, Germany	August 4, 2002
Pan Pacific Championships record	Susie O'Neill (AUS)	2:06.53	Sydney, Australia	August 25, 1999

== Results ==
All times are in minutes and seconds.

KEY:	q	Fastest non-qualifiers	Q	Qualified	CR	Championships record	NR	National record	PB	Personal best	SB	Seasonal best

=== Heats ===
The first round was held on August 26.

Rank	Heat	Lane	Name	Nationality	Time	Notes
1	2	5	Emily Mason	United States	2:10.37	Q
2	2	4	Petria Thomas	Australia	2:10.86	Q
3	2	3	Jen Button	Canada	2:11.05	Q
4	4	5	Mary Descenza	United States	2:11.25	Q
5	3	5	Yurie Yano	Japan	2:12.22	Q
6	3	2	Margaret Hoelzer	United States	2:12.40	Q
7	3	4	Yuko Nakanishi	Japan	2:12.55	Q
8	4	3	Dana Kirk	United States	2:12.68	Q
9	3	3	Liu Yin	China	2:12.96	Q
10	4	4	Maki Mita	Japan	2:13.42	Q
11	3	6	Felicity Galvez	Australia	2:13.55	Q
12	4	6	Jessica Deglau	Canada	2:14.17	Q
13	2	6	Audrey Lacroix	Canada	2:14.71	Q
14	1	4	Monique Ferreira	Brazil	2:14.77	Q
15	4	8	Sawami Fujita	Japan	2:14.85	Q
16	4	7	Heidi Crawford	Australia	2:16.54	Q
17	3	7	Madeleine Crippen	United States	2:17.13	
18	4	2	Mary Hill	United States	2:17.41	
19	2	2	Elizabeth Van Welie	New Zealand	2:17.51	
20	1	5	Bárbara Jatobá	Brazil	2:17.65	
21	2	1	Andrea Cassidy	United States	2:18.43	
22	3	1	Jessica Abbott	Australia	2:18.65	
23	2	8	Wing Suet Chan	Hong Kong	2:18.69	
24	3	8	Yvette Rodier	Australia	2:18.79	
25	1	2	Dena Durand	Canada	2:19.53	
26	1	6	Nathalie Bernard	New Zealand	2:19.55	
27	4	1	Megan Allan	New Zealand	2:21.04	
28	2	7	Rachel Coffee	Australia	2:21.28	
29	1	3	Carissa Thompson	New Zealand	2:22.92	
30	1	7	U Nice Chan	Singapore	2:23.77	

=== Semifinals ===
The semifinals were held on August 26.

Rank	Heat	Lane	Name	Nationality	Time	Notes
1	2	4	Emily Mason	United States	2:10.48	Q
2	1	5	Mary Descenza	United States	2:10.57	Q
3	1	4	Petria Thomas	Australia	2:10.74	Q
4	2	3	Yurie Yano	Japan	2:10.96	Q
5	1	6	Dana Kirk	United States	2:11.04	Q
6	2	6	Yuko Nakanishi	Japan	2:11.15	Q
7	1	3	Margaret Hoelzer	United States	2:11.41	Q
8	2	5	Jen Button	Canada	2:11.91	Q
9	2	7	Felicity Galvez	Australia	2:12.06	
10	2	1	Audrey Lacroix	Canada	2:12.54	
11	2	2	Liu Yin	China	2:12.69	
12	1	2	Maki Mita	Japan	2:12.93	
13	1	1	Sawami Fujita	Japan	2:14.65	
14	1	8	Elizabeth Van Welie	New Zealand	2:15.26	
15	1	7	Jessica Deglau	Canada	2:16.01	
16	2	8	Heidi Crawford	Australia	2:16.18	

=== Final ===
The final was held on August 27.

Rank	Lane	Name	Nationality	Time	Notes
1st place, gold medalist(s)	3	Petria Thomas	Australia	2:08.31	
2nd place, silver medalist(s)	5	Mary Descenza	United States	2:09.56	
3rd place, bronze medalist(s)	4	Emily Mason	United States	2:10.59	
4	1	Felicity Galvez	Australia	2:11.27	
5	2	Yuko Nakanishi	Japan	2:11.97	
6	8	Audrey Lacroix	Canada	2:12.45	
7	7	Jen Button	Canada	2:12.64	
8	6	Yurie Yano	Japan	2:14.10	
