= 1997 FINA Short Course World Championships – Women's 4 × 200 metre freestyle relay =

The finals and the qualifying heats of the Women's 4 × 200 metres Freestyle Relay event at the 1997 FINA Short Course World Championships were held on the first day of the competition, on Thursday 17 April 1997 in Gothenburg, Sweden.

== Finals ==
| Rank | Final | Time |
|---|---|---|
| | China; Wang Luna; Nian Yun; CHEN Yan; Shan Ying | 7:51.92 WR; 1:57.01; 1:56.35; 1:59.76; 1:58.80 |
| | Sweden; Johanna Sjöberg; Josefin Lillhage; Louise Jöhncke; Malin Nilsson | 7:56.04 |
| | Australia; Julie Greville; Natasha Bowron; Samantha Mackie; Emma Johnson | 7:56.12 |
| 4. | Germany | 7:58.04 |
| 5. | Great Britain | 7:59.18 |
| 6. | Canada | 8:02.80 |
| 7. | Denmark | 8:03.37 |
| 8. | Czech Republic | 8:20.97 |

== Qualifying heats ==
| Rank | Heats | Time |
|---|---|---|
| 1. | Australia | 7:59.65 |
| 2. | Sweden | 8:01.96 |
| 3. | China | 8:03.80 |
| 4. | Great Britain | 8:04.04 |
| 5. | Denmark | 8:05.14 |
| 6. | Germany | 8:06.54 |
| 7. | Canada | 8:07.68 |
| 8. | Czech Republic | 8:19.35 |
| 9. | Brazil | 8:25.09 |

== See also ==
- 1996 Women's Olympic Games 4 × 200 m Freestyle Relay
- 1997 Women's European LC Championships 4 × 200 m Freestyle Relay
