= Alexandra Zertsalova =

Kyrgyzstani swimmer

Personal information
- Full name: Alexandra Zertsalova
- National team: Kyrgyzstan
- Born: 18 January 1982 (age 44) Frunze, Kirghiz SSR, Soviet Union
- Height: 1.74 m (5 ft 9 in)
- Weight: 62 kg (137 lb)

Sport
- Sport: Swimming
- Strokes: Individual medley

Alexandra Zertsalova (Russian: Александра Зерцалова; born January 18, 1982) is a Kyrgyz former swimmer, who specialized in individual medley events. Zertsalova competed in a medley double at the 2000 Summer Olympics in Sydney. She achieved FINA B-standards of 2:23.30 (200 m individual medley) and 4:59.24 (400 m individual medley) from the Russian Open Championships in Saint Petersburg. On the first day of the Games, Zertsalova placed twenty-seventh in the 400 m individual medley. Swimming in heat one, she raced to the third seed by more than ten seconds behind Argentina's Georgina Bardach and Slovakia's Jana Korbasová in 5:09.03. Two days later, in the 200 m individual medley, Zertsalova posted a second-place time of 2:24.09 in the same heat, but finished in thirty-second place among 36 other swimmers from the prelims.
