= Swimming at the 1997 European Aquatics Championships – Women's 4 × 200 metre freestyle relay =

The final of the Women's 4 × 200 m Freestyle Relay event at the European LC Championships 1997 was held on Tuesday 1997-08-19 in Seville, Spain.

== Results ==
RANK	FINAL	TIME
	GERMANY; Dagmar Hase; Kristin Götz; Antje Buschschulte; Kerstin Kielgass	8:03.59; 2:01.23; 2:03.23; 2:00.39; 1:58.74
	SWEDEN; Louise Jöhncke; Josefin Lillhage; Johanna Sjöberg; Malin Svahnström	8:04.53; 2:00.62; 2:00.40; 2:02.30; 2:01.21
	DENMARK; Britt Raaby; Berit Puggaard; Mette Jacobsen; Ditte Jensen	8:07.26; 2:03.08; 2:02.02; 2:00.76; 2:01.40
4.	ROMNANIA; Camelia Potec; Simona Păduraru; Ioana Diaconescu; Luminița Dobrescu	8:08.49; 2:01.51; 2:02.73; 2:03.49; 2:00.76
5.	GREAT BRITAIN; Claire Huddart; Jessica Craig; Janing Benton; Karen Pickering	8:09.44; 2:01.72; 2:02.42; 2:03.34; 2:01.96
6.	NETHERLANDS; Carla Geurts; Minouche Smit; Wilma van Hofwegen; Kirsten Vlieghuis	8:11.49; 2:02.06; 2:04.79; 2:02.78; 2:01.86
7.	FRANCE; Solenne Figuès; Laetitia Choux; Ingrid Bourre; Hélène Ricardo	8:11.93; 2:02.97; 2:03.27; 2:03.84; 2:02.85
8.	ITALY; Cecilia Vianini; Luisa Striani; Anna Simoni; Caterina Borgato	8:18.28; 2:03.20; 2:05.88; 2:03.89; 2:05.31

== See also ==
- 1996 Women's Olympic Games 4 × 200 m Freestyle Relay
- 1997 Women's World Championships (SC) 4 × 200 m Freestyle Relay
