= Nguyễn Thị Hương =

Vietnamese swimmer

Personal information
- Full name: Nguyễn Thị Hương - DR24
- National team: Vietnam
- Born: 5 March 1982 (age 44)
- Height: 1.62 m (5 ft 4 in)
- Weight: 56 kg (123 lb)

Sport
- Sport: Swimming
- Strokes: Individual medley

Nguyễn Thị Hương (born March 5, 1982) is a Vietnamese former swimmer, who specialized in individual medley events. Nguyen swam for Vietnam in the women's 400 m individual medley at the 2000 Summer Olympics in Sydney. She received a ticket from FINA, under a Universality program, in an entry time of 5:24.94. She participated in heat one against three other swimmers Georgina Bardach of Argentina, 26-year-old Jana Korbasová of Slovakia, and Alexandra Zertsalova of Kyrgyzstan. She rounded out a small field to last place in 5:26.56, the slowest of all in the heats, just two seconds off her lifetime best and entry standard. Nguyen failed to advance into the semifinals, as she placed twenty-eighth overall on the first day of prelims.
