= Bill Peak =

American swimming coach

- Bill Peak, circa 1983, as Lakeside coach

Biographical details
- Born: 1945
- Died: December 23, 1996 Age 51; Orlando, Florida

Coaching career (HC unless noted)
- 1977–1984: Lakeside Swim Club; Louisville, Kentucky
- 1984–1995: Old Dominion Aquatic Club (Virginia Beach, Virginia)
- 1995–1996: Trinity Aquatic Club; Trinity Prep School (Orlando, Florida)

Accomplishments and honors

Awards
- 2007 ASCAA Hall of Fame

Bill Peak (1945 – December 23, 1996) was a swimming coach from the United States. He is probably best known for having coached Mary T. Meagher, a 1984 Olympic triple gold medalist, to World Records in the women's 100 and 200 fly, while both were with Lakeside Swim Team in Louisville, Kentucky. Meagher held her 100 and 200-meter butterfly World marks for 19 and 20 years, respectively; and as of 2014, her 2:05.96 time in the 200-meter butterfly from 1981 still remained the US Open mark fastest time swum in the United States.

Peak served in the U.S. Army in Viet Nam, winning a bronze star for combat service.

He coached the following swimming teams during his career:

- Lakeside Swim Team, Louisville, KY (1977–1984)
- Old Dominion Aquatic Club, Norfolk, Virginia (1984–1995)
- Trinity Aquatics, and Trinity Prep School Orlando, FL (1995–1996)

== Coaching overview ==
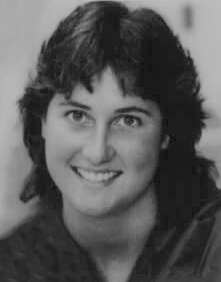
Mary T. Meagher in 1984

=== Lakeside Swim Club ===
During his years at Lakeside Swim Club, in addition to coaching Mary Meagher, Peak coached 1984 Olympian Tori Trees who placed fifth in the 200 meter backstroke in the 1984 Olympics, and Kara McGrath Chavey, a University of Texas Hall of Fame butterfly swimmer, and a 1987 Pan American gold medalist in the 200-meter butterfly.

In 1983, Peak's Lakeside Swim Club met at a pool in the Crescent Hill area of Louisville, which had been provided a plastic dome to accommodate winter swimming. In the summer, the Lakeside team moved back to the outdoor Lakeside pool. Peak's top group of around 40 swimmers which included Meagher in the prior year, had elite level training, meeting around 4:45–6:15 am to swim around 5000 yards, and meeting again from 3:30–6:30 pm to swim up to an additional 7000 yards. The Lakeside program in 1983 consisted of 160 total age-group swimmers.

Working with Meagher, Peak successfully integrated strength training into her program several days a week.

Due to budget cuts while at Lakeside, Peak was forced to resign in April 1983, and found employment at Old Dominion Aquatic Club in Norfolk, Virginia.

=== Old Dominion Swim Club ===
At Old Dominion in Virginia Beach, Virginia, in greater Norfolk, where Peak was hired in August 1984, he acted as both adviser and coach, and brought along Mike Powell, one of his assistant coaches at Lakeside Swim Club. At the time, the Dominion club was three years old, and had around 160 age group swimmers.

Beginning in February 1988 at Old Dominion, he helped train Mary T. Meagher for the 1988 Olympics. Meagher credited Peak's efforts with returning her to a level of fitness capable of making the 1988 U.S. team. In March 1988, under Peak's guidance, Meagher won the 200 meter butterfly event at the U.S. Indoor National Meet. She won both the 100 and 200 butterfly events in June at the Las Vegas Sports Festival, and won again at the Swim to Seoul Meet. Peak informed Meagher that making a third Olympic team would require total commitment. When she qualified for the 1988 team, she became only the third American woman to qualify for three Olympics, and would later win two Olympic medals swimming butterfly events in Seoul. At Old Dominion, Peak also coached Kathy Arris, a 200 Individual Medley champion in National competition. He also coached Darby Chang while at Old Dominion, an NCAA champion in six events as a Freshman at the University of Texas.

From 1995 to 1996, in his late career in Florida, he trained 1996 Atlanta Olympian Mirjana Bosevska as a sophomore at Trinity High School, as part of the Trinity Aquatic Swim Team. Bosevka would become the first swimmer to represent the country of Macedonia as an Olympic competitor first in the 1996 Atlanta Olympics and later in the 2000 Sydney Games.

=== Honors ===
He was elected to the American Swimming Coaches Association's Hall of Fame in 2007.

After a three-year struggle with cancer, he died on December 23, 1996, at 51 at his home in Orlando, Florida, and was survived by his wife the former Diane Peace, a daughter, and two sons.
