= Tori Trees =

American swimmer (born 1965)

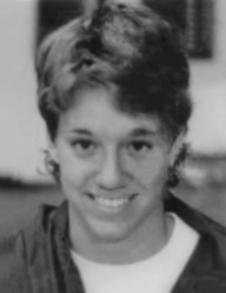
- Trees in 1984

Personal information
- Full name: Tori Leigh Trees
- National team: United States
- Born: June 6, 1965 (age 61) Louisville, Kentucky, U.S.
- Height: 5 ft 10 in (1.78 m)
- Weight: 146 lb (66 kg)

Sport
- Sport: Swimming
- Strokes: Backstroke
- Club: Lakeside Swim Club; Louisville, Kentucky
- College team: University of Texas
- Coach: Bill Peak (Lakeside SC); Richard Quick (U. Texas)

Tori Leigh Trees (born June 6, 1965), later known by her married name Tori Smith, is an American former competition swimmer who competed for the University of Texas, and represented the United States at the 1984 Summer Olympics in Los Angeles, placing fifth in the finals of the 200 meter backstroke.

Trees was born June 6, 1965, in Louisville, Kentucky, and swam for the Lakeside Swim Club, and attended Louisville's Atherton High School. Swimming for Lakeside at the girls 10 and under age group in the 200 Individual Medley at the Ohio Valley Swimming Championships in June, 1975, Trees placed third with a time of 3:03.762. Through much of her High School career, Trees swam for Bill Peak at the Lakeside Swim Club of Louisville who coached at Lakeside from 1979 to 1984. On February 11, 1983, at the High School Regional Swimming Championships at the Crescent Hill Pool, Trees won the 200 Individual Medley in a time of 2:10.96, and placed first with a 59.81 in the 100 backstroke. Trees was the holder of state records in both the 200 I.M. and the 100 backstroke.

== University of Texas ==
Trees attended the University of Texas at Austin, where she competed for coach Richard Quick's Texas Longhorns swimming and diving team in National Collegiate Athletic Association (NCAA) competition from 1984 to 1987. In 1984, swimming for Texas, she placed second in the 100 backstroke with a time of 56.79 at the Women's Southwest Conference Swimming and Diving Championships in Austin. In 1985, she won the NCAA national championship in the 200-yard backstroke, recording a time of 1:59.11. With a strong career at Texas, she was an NCAA champion six times, earned 14-time All-American honors 14 times. Significantly, Trees helped the Texas Women's team to capture four NCAA team titles.

== 1984 Olympics ==
At the 1984 Los Angeles Olympics, she competed in the women's 200-meter backstroke event in early August, and finished fifth in the final with a time of 2:15.73. Jolanda de Rover of the Netherlands won the event in a time of 2:12.38, with American Amy White placing second for the silver with a time of 2:13.04, and Romanian Anca Patrascoui taking the bronze for third place with a time of 2:13.29.

Trees married John Smith, who also swam for the University of Texas. Their son, Clark Smith, also competed in swimming for the University of Texas and was a gold medalist in the 2016 Olympics in the 4x200 freestyle relay.

=== Coaching ===
Dedicated to the sport of swimming, after her time as a competitor at the University of Texas, Trees-Smith served as Aquatics Director for the Houstonian Club in 1989, where she coached United States Swimming age-group teams and summer leagues. Moving to Denver in 2000, she served with Greenwood Athletic Club as an age group coach, and also was a high school swim coach. Their son Clark, a 2016 Olympian, would swim for the Denver Swim Academy.

=== Honors ===
In 2015, Trees was inducted into the University of Texas Hall of Honor, partly for her contributions leading the Texas women's swimming team to NCAA Championships.

== See also ==
- List of University of Texas at Austin alumni
