= Gabrielle Rose =

Gabrielle Rose may refer to:

- Gabrielle Rose (swimmer) (born 1977), American swimmer
- Gabrielle Rose (actress) (born 1954), Canadian actress
