= Whitney Metzler =

American swimmer (born 1978)

Personal information
- Full name: Whitney Beth Metzler
- National team: United States
- Born: April 19, 1978 (age 48)
- Height: 5 ft 9 in (1.75 m)
- Weight: 121 lb (55 kg)

Sport
- Sport: Swimming
- Strokes: Freestyle, individual medley
- Club: North Baltimore Aquatic Club
- College team: University of Florida

Whitney Beth Metzler (born April 19, 1978) is an American former competition swimmer.

Metzler grew up in York, Pennsylvania. She followed her older sister Staci into swimming for the York YWCA, Sonship Aquatics, and ultimately, to the North Baltimore Aquatic Club.

Metzler represented the United States at the 1996 Summer Olympics in Atlanta, Georgia. She competed in the women's 400-meter individual medley, advanced to the event final, and finished eighth overall with a time of 4:46.20.

Metzler attended the University of Florida in Gainesville, Florida, where she swam for the Florida Gators swimming and diving team in National Collegiate Athletic Association (NCAA) and Southeastern Conference (SEC) competition from 1996 to 1998. She was recognized as the Gators' outstanding freshman, and later, as an All-American for her performance as a member of the Gators' 4×200-yard freestyle relay team in 1997. Her college swimming career was cut short after two years by a shoulder injury. She graduated from the University of Florida with a bachelor's degree in public relations in 1999.

Metzler later graduated the Pace University School of Law in White Plains, New York. She worked as an attorney for the Greenberg Traurig law firm from 2005 to 2008. She is licensed as an attorney in New York, Pennsylvania and Florida. She worked as an attorney for the Pennsylvania House of Representatives from 2010 to 2021, writing that state's medical marijuana law, among other health care advancements. She is now the Chief Compliance Officer of Insa, a medical and adult use cannabis company.

She was inducted into the Maryland Swimming Hall of Fame in 2001. She has three sons and two daughters.

== See also ==
- List of University of Florida alumni
- List of University of Florida Olympians
