= Jochen Herbst =

German swimmer

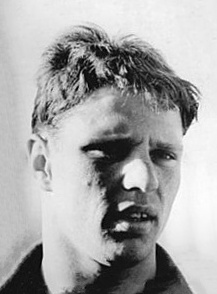
- Jochen Herbst in 1968

Personal information
- Born: 16 October 1942 (age 83) Halle (Saale), Germany
- Height: 1.85 m (6 ft 1 in)
- Weight: 75 kg (165 lb)

Sport
- Sport: Swimming
- Club: ASK Vorwärts Rostock

Jochen Herbst (born 16 October 1942) is a retired German swimmer. He competed in the 4×200 m freestyle relay at the 1968 Summer Olympics and finished in seventh place. During his career he won eight national titles in the 200 m (1962, 1969), 400 m (1962), 1500 m (1962), 4×100 m (1963, 1965) and 4×200 m (1963, 1965) freestyle events.

He married Eva Wittke, a German swimmer who also competed at the 1968 Olympics. Their daughter Sabine Herbst-Klenz (born 1974) and son Stefan Herbst are also retired Olympic swimmers.
