= Jessica Abbott =

Australian swimmer (born 1985)

Personal information
- Full name: Jessica Abbott
- Nationality: Australian
- Born: 22 July 1985 (age 40)
- Height: 1.67 m (5 ft 6 in)
- Weight: 53 kg (117 lb)

Sport
- Sport: Swimming
- Strokes: freestyle
Medal record
Commonwealth Games
Bronze medal – third place	2002 Manchester	400 m medley
Oceania Championships
Gold medal – first place	2000 Christchurch	4×100 m freestyle
Bronze medal – third place	2000 Christchurch	50 m backstroke
- Updated on 16 January 2014

Jessica Abbott (born 22 July 1985) is an Australian swimmer.

== Career ==
Abbott first competed for Australia at the 2000 Oceania Swimming Championships in Christchurch where she won gold in the 4 × 100 metre freestyle relay alongside Melinda Geraghty, Michelle Engelsman and Joy Symons and won bronze in the 50 metre backstroke event.

At the 2002 Commonwealth Games in Manchester, Abbott won bronze in the 400 metre individual medley in 4:47.11. and finished 6th 200 metre individual medley in 2:17.00.

She competed in the 2002 Pan Pacific Swimming Championships in Yokohama, Japan in the 200 metre butterfly and made the finals both the 200 and 400 metre individual medleys.

At the 2003 World Championships in Barcelona, Abbott finished 21st in the 400 metre individual medley in 4:52.72.

At the 2003 World Swimming Championships in Barcelona, both Jessica and her sister Chloe Abbott represented Australia in swimming simultaneously – the first sisters to do so since Karen and Narelle Moras at the 1972 Munich Olympics.
