= Eva Wittke =

German swimmer

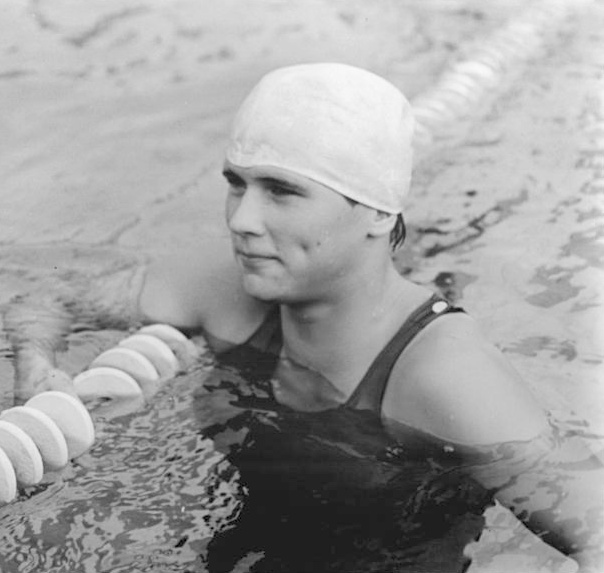
- Eva Wittke in 1968

Personal information
- Born: 18 July 1951 (age 74) Freital, East Germany
- Height: 1.72 m (5 ft 8 in)
- Weight: 63 kg (139 lb)

Sport
- Sport: Swimming
- Club: SC DHfK, Leipzig

Eva Wittke (born 18 July 1951) is a retired German swimmer. She competed in the 400 m individual medley and 4×100 m medley relay at the 1968 Summer Olympics and finished fifth in the latter event.

She married Jochen Herbst, a German swimmer who also competed at the 1968 Olympics. Their daughter Sabine Herbst-Klenz (born 1974) and son Stefan Herbst are also retired Olympic swimmers. Her grandson Ramon Klenz is also a good swimmer.
