= Lee Ji-hyun (swimmer, born 1982) =

South Korean swimmer

Personal information
- Full name: Lee Ji-hyun
- National team: South Korea
- Born: 10 March 1982 (age 44) Gyeonggi-do, South Korea
- Height: 1.68 m (5 ft 6 in)
- Weight: 55 kg (121 lb)

Korean name
- Hangul: 이지현
- RR: I Jihyeon
- MR: I Chihyŏn

Sport
- Sport: Swimming
- Strokes: Individual medley

Lee Ji-hyun (Korean: 이지현; born March 10, 1982) is a South Korean former swimmer, who specialized in individual medley events. She represented her nation South Korea in two editions of the Olympic Games (1996 and 2000), and also a top eight finalist in the 400 m individual medley at the 1998 Asian Games in Bangkok, Thailand.

Lee made her first South Korean team, as a fourteen-year-old teen, at the 1996 Summer Olympics in Atlanta, swimming only in the women's 400 m individual medley. There, she fought off a sprint freestyle challenge from Hsieh Shu-tzu to invincibly dip the five-minute barrier for the sixth spot and twenty-eighth overall in the opening heat, finishing with a time of 4:59.52.

At the 2000 Summer Olympics in Sydney, Lee qualified for the second time in the 400 m individual medley by clearing FINA B-cut of 4:48.76 from the Dong-A Swimming Championships in Ulsan. Swimming in the last of four heats, Lee came from behind at the final turn to edge out Malaysia's Sia Wai Yen with a robust freestyle kick for the seventh seed in 4:58.94, just ten seconds below her submitted entry standard. Lee failed to advance into the semifinals, as she placed twenty-third overall on the first day of prelims.
