= Jana Korbasová =

Slovak swimmer

Personal information
- Full name: Jana Korbasová
- National team: Slovakia
- Born: 20 March 1974 (age 52) Košice, Czechoslovakia
- Height: 1.64 m (5 ft 5 in)
- Weight: 60 kg (132 lb)

Sport
- Sport: Swimming
- Strokes: Backstroke, medley

Jana Korbasová (born March 20, 1974) is a Slovak former swimmer, who specialized in backstroke and in individual medley events. She represented Slovakia at the 2000 Summer Olympics, and later became a sixth-place finalist in the 200 m backstroke (2:12.81) at the European Short Course Championships in Valencia, Spain on that same year. Since her retirement came in 2001, Korbasova currently serves as the acting head coach for Howick Pakuranga Swim Club in New Zealand. She has competed in several New Zealand Ironman in Taupo achieving the fastest swim time for women in the non professional division. She won the 2018 New Zealand Coach of the Year.

Korbasova competed only in two individual events at the 2000 Summer Olympics in Sydney. She achieved FINA B-standards of 2:20.38 (200 m backstroke) from the Slovakia Grand Prix in Bratislava and 4:55.45 (400 m individual medley) from the European Championships in Helsinki, Finland. On the first day of the Games, Korbasova placed twenty-fourth in the 400 m individual medley. Swimming in heat one, she came up with a spectacular swim on the dominant backstroke leg to overhaul a five-minute barrier and pick up a second seed in 4:59.05, nearly five seconds behind the leader Georgina Bardach of Argentina. Five days later, in the 200 m backstroke, Korbasova edged out Hungary's Annamária Kiss on the final stretch to establish a Slovak record and a sixth-seeded time of 2:19.37 from heat two, but her relentless effort was worthy enough for a twenty-seventh spot on the morning prelims.
