= Lára Hrund Bjargardóttir =

Icelandic swimmer (born 1981)

Personal information
- Full name: Lára Hrund Bjargardóttir
- National team: Iceland
- Born: 15 July 1981 (age 45) Reykjavík, Iceland
- Height: 1.67 m (5 ft 6 in)
- Weight: 58 kg (128 lb)

Sport
- Sport: Swimming
- Strokes: Freestyle, medley
- Club: Sundfélagið Húnar
- College team: University of California, Irvine (U.S.)

Lára Hrund Bjargardóttir (born 15 July 1981) is an Icelandic former swimmer, who specialized in freestyle and individual medley events. She is a multiple-time Big West Conference honoree, four-time Icelandic record holder, and a member of the swimming team for the UC Irvine Anteaters at the University of California, Irvine.

Bjargardottir made her first Icelandic team at the 2000 Summer Olympics in Sydney. There, she failed to advance into the semifinals in any of her individual events, finishing twenty-seventh in the 200 m freestyle (2:05.22), and thirty-sixth in the 100 m freestyle (58.44).

At the 2004 Summer Olympics in Athens, Bjargardottir shortened her program on her second Olympic appearance, swimming only in the 200 m individual medley. She achieved a FINA B-standard of 2:20.35 from the World Championships in Barcelona, Spain. Bjargardottir challenged five other swimmers in heat one, including two-time Olympians Marina Mulyayeva of Kazakhstan and Vered Borochovski of Israel. She raced to fourth place by 0.62 of a second behind 16-year-old swimmer Park Na-Ri of South Korea with a time of 2:22.00. Bjargardottir failed to qualify for the semifinals, as she placed twenty-seventh overall for the second time in the preliminaries.
