= Samantha Nesbit =

English swimmer (born 1982)

Personal information
- Nationality: British
- Born: 25 February 1982 (age 44) Portsmouth

Sport
- Sport: Swimming
- Strokes: medley
- Club: Portsmouth Northsea

Samantha Jane Nesbit (born 1982) is a female former international swimmer from England.

== Swimming career ==
Nesbit became a British champion after winning the ASA National British Championships over 400 metres medley in 1998.

Nesbit represented England in the 200 and 400 metres individual medley event, at the 1998 Commonwealth Games in Kuala Lumpur, Malaysia. She also won four gold medals at the 1995 Youth Olympics which were held in Bath which was a record medal haul at the time. Also in 1995 Nesbit won 12 National Championship Gold medals in one meet, losing only in her 13th final to Melanie Marhsall. No UK swimmer has won more National Golds in one meeting to date.
