= Yana Klochkova =

Ukrainian swimmer (born 1982)

Hero of Ukraine Yana Klochkova OGS
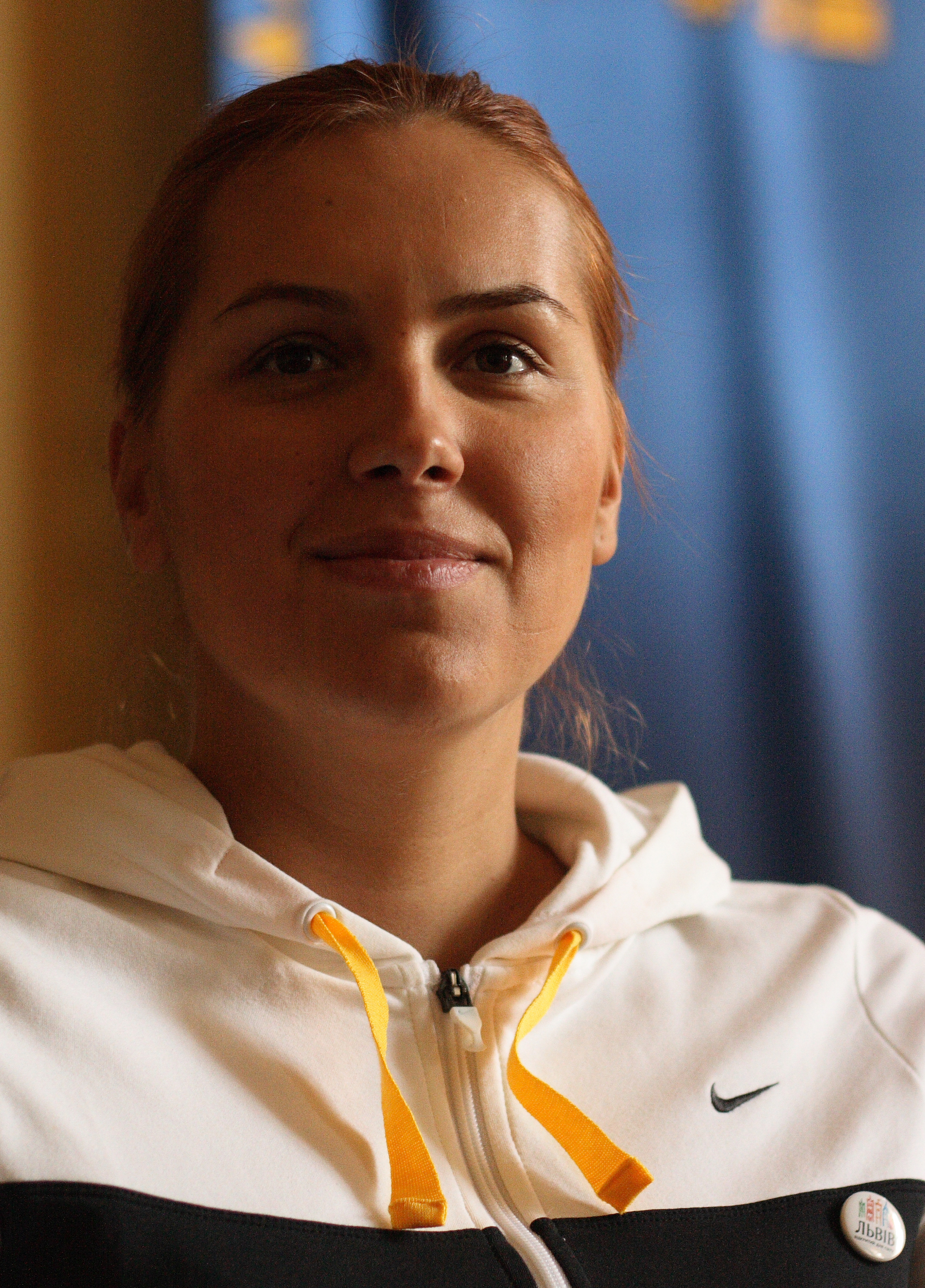

Personal information
- Full name: Yana Oleksandrivna Klochkova
- Nickname: The Goldfish
- Nationality: Ukraine
- Born: 7 August 1982 (age 44) Simferopol, Crimean Oblast, Ukrainian SSR, Soviet Union
- Height: 1.82 m (6 ft 0 in)
- Weight: 70 kg (154 lb)

Sport
- Sport: Swimming
- Strokes: Freestyle, Individual medley
- Club: Dynamo (Ukraine)
- Coach: Nina Kozhukh; Oleksandr Kozhukh
Medal record
Women's swimming
Representing Ukraine
Event	1st	2nd	3rd
Olympic Games	4	1	0
World Championships (LC)	4	2	0
World Championships (SC)	6	2	0
European Championships (LC)	10	2	4
European Championships (SC)	9	3	0
Summer Universiade	7	1	0
Goodwill Games	2	2	1
European Junior Championships	4	2	0
Total	46	15	5
Olympic Games
Gold medal – first place	2000 Sydney	200 m medley
Gold medal – first place	2000 Sydney	400 m medley
Gold medal – first place	2004 Athens	200 m medley
Gold medal – first place	2004 Athens	400 m medley
Silver medal – second place	2000 Sydney	800 m freestyle
World Championships (LC)
Gold medal – first place	2001 Fukuoka	400 m medley
Gold medal – first place	2001 Fukuoka	400 m freestyle
Gold medal – first place	2003 Barcelona	200 m medley
Gold medal – first place	2003 Barcelona	400 m medley
Silver medal – second place	1998 Perth	400 m medley
Silver medal – second place	2001 Fukuoka	200 m medley
World Championships (SC)
Gold medal – first place	1999 Hong Kong	400 m medley
Gold medal – first place	2000 Athens	200 m medley
Gold medal – first place	2000 Athens	400 m medley
Gold medal – first place	2002 Moscow	400 m freestyle
Gold medal – first place	2002 Moscow	200 m medley
Gold medal – first place	2002 Moscow	400 m medley
Silver medal – second place	1999 Hong Kong	200 m medley
Silver medal – second place	2000 Athens	400 m freestyle
European Championships (LC)
Gold medal – first place	1999 Istanbul	200 m medley
Gold medal – first place	1999 Istanbul	400 m medley
Gold medal – first place	2000 Helsinki	400 m freestyle
Gold medal – first place	2000 Helsinki	200 m medley
Gold medal – first place	2000 Helsinki	400 m medley
Gold medal – first place	2002 Berlin	400 m freestyle
Gold medal – first place	2002 Berlin	200 m medley
Gold medal – first place	2002 Berlin	400 m medley
Gold medal – first place	2004 Madrid	200 m medley
Gold medal – first place	2004 Madrid	400 m medley
Silver medal – second place	1997 Sevilla	400 m medley
Silver medal – second place	2004 Madrid	4×100 m medley
Bronze medal – third place	1997 Sevilla	200 m medley
Bronze medal – third place	1999 Istanbul	400 m freestyle
Bronze medal – third place	2002 Berlin	4×100 m medley
Bronze medal – third place	2004 Madrid	400 m freestyle
European Championships (SC)
Gold medal – first place	1999 Lisbon	400 m freestyle
Gold medal – first place	1999 Lisbon	800 m freestyle
Gold medal – first place	1999 Lisbon	200 m medley
Gold medal – first place	1999 Lisbon	400 m medley
Gold medal – first place	2000 Valencia	200 m medley
Gold medal – first place	2000 Valencia	400 m medley
Gold medal – first place	2001 Antwerp	200 m medley
Gold medal – first place	2002 Riesa	200 m medley
Gold medal – first place	2002 Riesa	400 m medley
Silver medal – second place	2001 Antwerp	400 m freestyle
Silver medal – second place	2001 Antwerp	400 m medley
Silver medal – second place	2002 Riesa	400 m freestyle
Summer Universiade
Gold medal – first place	2001 Beijing	800 m freestyle
Gold medal – first place	2001 Beijing	200 m medley
Gold medal – first place	2003 Daegu	200 m freestyle
Gold medal – first place	2003 Daegu	200 m butterfly
Gold medal – first place	2003 Daegu	200 m medley
Gold medal – first place	2003 Daegu	400 m medley
Gold medal – first place	2007 Bangkok	400 m medley
Silver medal – second place	2007 Bangkok	200 m medley
Goodwill Games
Gold medal – first place	2001 Brisbane	800 m freestyle
Gold medal – first place	2001 Brisbane	400 m medley
Silver medal – second place	2001 Brisbane	400 m freestyle
Silver medal – second place	2001 Brisbane	200 m medley
Bronze medal – third place	2001 Brisbane	Team
European Junior Championships
Gold medal – first place	1997 Glasgow	200 m medley
Gold medal – first place	1997 Glasgow	400 m medley
Gold medal – first place	1998 Antwerp	200 m medley
Gold medal – first place	1998 Antwerp	400 m medley
Silver medal – second place	1996 København	400 m medley
Silver medal – second place	1998 Antwerp	200 m breaststroke

Yana Oleksandrivna Klochkova (Ukrainian: Яна Олександрівна Клочкова; born 7 August 1982) is a Ukrainian swimmer, who has won five Olympic medals in her career, with four of them being gold. She is Merited Master of Sports (1998), Hero of Ukraine (2004). Klochkova was the most awarded Olympian from Ukraine until in 2024 fencer Olga Kharlan overtook her.

Yana Klochkova set 50 Ukrainian records in 25- and 50-meter swimming pools at distances of 100, 200, 400 meters with integrated swimming; 200, 400 and 800 meters freestyle; 100 and 200 meters on the back; 200 meters butterfly and relay swimming. At the Olympic Games in Sydney, she set a world record in a 400-meter medley swimming and a European record in a 200-meter medley swimming.

== Biography ==
Klochkova was born on 7 August 1982 in the city of Simferopol (situated in Crimea). She moved from there to Kharkiv, then to Kyiv.

Sports Society — "Dynamo", Major of the Ministry of Internal Affairs of Ukraine.

Coaches⁣ — Honored Trainer of Ukraine, Honored Worker of Physical Culture of Ukraine Nina Kozhukh and Honored Trainer of the USSR, Honored Worker of Physical Culture of Ukraine Alexander Kozhukh.

In the 2006 Ukrainian local elections Klochkova was elected to the Kharkiv City Council joining the faction of and became a member of the Party of Regions.

She retired in 2009 at the age of 26.

Klochkova has a son named Oleksandr born 21 June 2010. The father is Georgian athlete and businessman Nodarovich Rostoshvili. The relationship between Rostoshvili and Klochkova lasted 18 months and Rostoshvili moved back to Georgia before their son was born and Klochkova raised her son alone.

Following the Russian invasion and unilaterally annexation of Crimea in 2014 Klochkova publicly continued to visit Crimea while living in Kyiv. When questioned about this she stated that the peninsula is her home and her parents continued to live there.

In 2021 Klochkova complained that she had not been invited to the celebration of the 30th anniversary of Ukrainian independence. She stated that it was important to have Olympic champions present on such celebrations since "These are the people who represent our country abroad, play the anthem of our country, raise the flag." At the time her son Oleksandr lived permanently with his grandparents in Crimea and she speculated that that could have been a reason not to invite her. (Note: According to Klochkova (in September 2021) her son "likes it there. Maybe in time something will change.") According to then Ukraine's Youth and Sport Minister Vadym Gutzeit the Ukrainian Swimming Federation had tried to contact Klochkova, but she had not responded. On 16 September 2021 Klochkova organised a swimming cross of the Dnipro river in Kyiv in honor of swimming day and the 30th anniversary of Ukrainian independence.

In 2022, Klochkova left Kyiv to live in Crimea. According to the Ukrainian news website Obozrevatel she lives with her son in Gurzuf. Klochkova has never publicly made a statement on the 2022 Russian invasion of Ukraine.

=== Farewell to the track ===
In January 2008, Klochkova announced her retirement from sports.

On 24 March 2009 in the Olympic swimming pool "Aquarena" in Kharkiv, during the first stage of the Ukrainian Swimming Cup, with completely filled stands, Yana Klochkova's official "parting with water" took place. Officials (Kharkiv Mayor Mykhailo Dobkin, Vice Governor Sergei Storozhenko, Head of the Ukrainian Swimming Federation Oleg Dyomin, two-time Olympic champion volleyball player Yuriy Poyarkov and many others) spoke about the swimmers, followed by the presentation of flowers and gifts from everyone. Klochkova, nicknamed "the goldfish" in Ukraine, was symbolically presented with an aquarium with a live goldfish.

In 2011, Yana Klochkova headed the Kyiv branch of the National Olympic Committee of Ukraine, but in 2012, without waiting for support for her initiatives from the executive committee of the Olympic Committee, she left this post.

== Awards ==
Her gold medals came in the 200 meter individual medley and the 400 meter individual medley at the 2000 and 2004 Summer Olympics; her silver medal came in the 800 meter freestyle at the 2000 Summer Olympics. She has also won ten titles at swimming's world championships, nineteen European championship titles. She currently holds the short-course world record in the 400 meter individual medley. Her 400 m individual medley world record was broken by American Katie Hoff at the 2007 World Championships in Melbourne.

On 28 July 2001, she won a silver medal by defeating Qi Hui of China in the women's 200-meter individual medley at the 2001 World Aquatics Championships in Fukuoka, Japan. The same year, she won gold medal for 400-meter individual medley at the same event and on two days later won another gold in the 400-meter freestyle. In 2003, she won four golds at the Summer Universiade in South Korea. In 2004, she was named by Swimming World magazine as the World Female Swimmer of the Year and the same year was awarded Hero of Ukraine medal by President Leonid Kuchma.

== Titles ==
Yana Klochkova's titles include:

=== Olympic Champion ===
- 2000, Sydney: 200 m individual medley
- 2000, Sydney: 400 m individual medley
- 2004, Athens: 200 m individual medley
- 2004, Athens: 400 m individual medley

=== World Champion, Long Course ===
- 2001, Fukuoka: 400 m freestyle
- 2001, Fukuoka: 400 m individual medley
- 2003, Barcelona: 200 m individual medley
- 2003, Barcelona: 400 m individual medley

=== World Champion, Short Course ===
- 1999, Hong Kong: 400 m individual medley
- 2000, Athens: 200 m individual medley
- 2000, Athens: 400 m individual medley
- 2002, Moscow: 400 m freestyle
- 2002, Moscow: 200 m individual medley
- 2002, Moscow: 400 m individual medley

=== European Champion, Long Course ===
- 1999, Istanbul: 200 m individual medley
- 1999, Istanbul: 400 m individual medley
- 2000, Helsinki: 400 m freestyle
- 2000, Helsinki: 200 m individual medley
- 2000, Helsinki: 400 m individual medley
- 2002, Berlin: 400 m freestyle
- 2002, Berlin: 200 m individual medley
- 2002, Berlin: 400 m individual medley
- 2004, Madrid: 200 m individual medley
- 2004, Madrid: 400 m individual medley

=== European Champion, Short Course ===
- 1999, Lisbon: 400 m freestyle
- 1999, Lisbon: 800 m freestyle
- 1999, Lisbon: 200 m individual medley
- 1999, Lisbon: 400 m individual medley
- 2000, Valencia: 200 m individual medley
- 2000, Valencia: 400 m individual medley
- 2001, Antwerp: 200 m individual medley
- 2002, Riesa: 200 m individual medley
- 2002, Riesa: 400 m individual medley

=== Universiade Champion, Long Course ===
- 2003, Daegu: 200 m freestyle
- 2003, Daegu: 200 m butterfly
- 2003, Daegu: 200 m individual medley
- 2003, Daegu: 400 m individual medley
- 2007, Bangkok: 400 m individual medley

=== Honorary titles ===
"Person of the Year 2000" in the nomination "Sportsman of the Year".

"Person of the Year 2003" in the nomination "Sportsman of the Year".

Honorary Citizen of Kharkiv and Donetsk.

== International championships (50 m) ==
Meet	400 free	800 free	200 fly	200 medley	400 medley	4×100 free	4×100 medley
EC 1997			23rd	3rd place, bronze medalist(s)	2nd place, silver medalist(s)		
WC 1998				4th	2nd place, silver medalist(s)		
EC 1999	3rd place, bronze medalist(s)			1st place, gold medalist(s)	1st place, gold medalist(s)		
EC 2000	1st place, gold medalist(s)			1st place, gold medalist(s)	1st place, gold medalist(s)		
OG 2000		2nd place, silver medalist(s)		1st place, gold medalist(s)	1st place, gold medalist(s)		
WC 2001	1st place, gold medalist(s)			2nd place, silver medalist(s)	1st place, gold medalist(s)		
EC 2002	1st place, gold medalist(s)			1st place, gold medalist(s)	1st place, gold medalist(s)		3rd place, bronze medalist(s)
WC 2003			heats^{[a]}	1st place, gold medalist(s)	1st place, gold medalist(s)		
EC 2004	3rd place, bronze medalist(s)			1st place, gold medalist(s)	1st place, gold medalist(s)		2nd place, silver medalist(s)
OG 2004				1st place, gold medalist(s)	1st place, gold medalist(s)		10th
WC 2005							
EC 2006				4th		9th	4th
WC 2007							
EC 2008				8th	12th	5th	

^{a} Klochkova qualified from the heats, but scratched the semi-finals

== See also ==
- World record progression 400 metres medley
- List of multiple Olympic gold medalists
- List of top Olympic gold medalists in swimming
- List of individual gold medalists in swimming at the Olympics and World Aquatics Championships (women)
- List of European Aquatics Championships medalists in swimming (women)
- List of European Short Course Swimming Championships medalists (women)
- List of World Aquatics Championships medalists in swimming (women)

== Notes ==
Records
Preceded by (China) Chen Yan	World Record Holder; Women's 400 Individual Medley; 16 September 2000 – 1 April 2007	Succeeded by (United States) Katie Hoff
Preceded by (China) Dai Guohong	World Record Holder; Women's 400 Individual Medley (25 m); 20 January 2002 – 9 April 2008	Succeeded by (Zimbabwe) Kirsty Coventry
Awards
Preceded by (Germany) Hannah Stockbauer	Swimming World's World Swimmer of the Year; 2004	Succeeded by (Australia) Leisel Jones
Preceded by (Germany) Hannah Stockbauer	Swimming World's European Swimmer of the Year; 2004	Succeeded by (Poland) Otylia Jędrzejczak
Summer Olympics
Preceded by Denys Sylantyev	Flagbearer for Ukraine; Beijing 2008	Succeeded by Roman Gontiuk
