= Maggie Bowen =

American swimmer

Personal information
- Born: 1980 (age 45–46) Jackson, Mississippi, US

Sport
- Sport: Swimming
- Club: Auburn Aquatics
Medal record
Swimming
Representing United States
World Championships
Gold medal – first place	2001 Fukuoka	200 m medley
Silver medal – second place	2001 Fukuoka	400 m medley
Pan Pacific Championships
Silver medal – second place	2002 Yokohama	400m medley
Bronze medal – third place	2002 Yokohama	200m medley
Pan American Games
Silver medal – second place	1999 Winnipeg	200m medley
Silver medal – second place	1999 Winnipeg	400m medley

Martha "Maggie" Bowen-Hanna (née Bowen; born 1980) is a retired American swimmer who won two medals in individual medley events at the 2001 World Aquatics Championships.

In 2000, she narrowly missed Olympic qualification by finishing third in the 200 m medley in the US trials. She won several National Collegiate Athletic Association titles in medley and freestyle events in 2001–2003.

== See also ==
- List of World Aquatics Championships medalists in swimming (women)
