= Petra Chaves =

Portuguese swimmer

Personal information
- Born: 2 February 1978 (age 48)

Sport
- Sport: Swimming

Petra Chaves (born 2 February 1978) is a Portuguese backstroke and medley swimmer. She competed in two events at the 1996 Summer Olympics.
