= Yasuko Tajima =

Japanese swimmer (born 1981)

Personal information
- Full name: Yasuko Tajima
- Nationality: Japan
- Born: 8 May 1981 (age 45) Kanagawa, Japan

Sport
- Sport: Swimming
- Strokes: Individual medley
Medal record
Women's swimming
Representing Japan
Olympic Games
Silver medal – second place	2000 Sydney	400 m medley
World Championships (LC)
Bronze medal – third place	1998 Perth	400 m medley
Pan Pacific Championships
Silver medal – second place	1999 Sydney	400 m medley

Yasuko Tajima (田島 寧子, Tajima Yasuko) (born 8 May 1981 in Kanagawa) is a former medley swimmer from Japan. She won the silver medal in the 400m Individual Medley at the 2000 Summer Olympics in Sydney, Australia.
