= Nadège Cliton =

French swimmer (born 1978)

Personal information
- Born: June 18, 1978 (age 48)

Sport
- Sport: Swimming
- Strokes: Medley
Medal record
Representing France
Mediterranean Games
Gold medal – first place	1993 Languedoc-Roussillon	200m individual medley
Gold medal – first place	1997 Bari	200m individual medley
Gold medal – first place	1997 Bari	400m individual medley

Nadège Cliton (born 18 June 1978) is a French former medley swimmer who competed in the 1996 Summer Olympics.
