= Martina Nemec =

Austrian swimmer

Personal information
- Born: 21 January 1976 (age 50) Mödling, Austria

Sport
- Sport: Swimming

Martina Nemec (born 21 January 1976) is an Austrian breaststroke, freestyle and medley swimmer. She competed at the 1992 Summer Olympics and the 1996 Summer Olympics.
