= Lourdes Becerra =

Spanish swimmer

Personal information
- Full name: María Lourdes Becerra Portero
- Born: 4 June 1973 (age 53) Sabadell, Catalonia, Spain
- Height: 172 cm (5 ft 8 in)
- Weight: 58 kg (128 lb)

Sport
- Sport: Swimming
- Strokes: breaststroke and medley
- Club: Club Natació Sabadell
Medal record
Women's swimming
Representing Spain
World Championships (SC)
Bronze medal – third place	1999 Hong Kong	400 m medley
European Championships (SC)
Silver medal – second place	1998 Sheffield	200 m breaststroke
Bronze medal – third place	1998 Sheffield	400 m medley

María Lourdes Becerra Portero (Note: In this Spanish name, the first or paternal surname is Becerra and the second or maternal family name is Portero.) (born 4 June 1973 in Sabadell, Catalonia) is a former medley and breaststroke swimmer, who competed at three consecutive Summer Olympics, starting in 1992 in Barcelona. Her best Olympic result came in 1996, when she finished seventh in the 400 m individual medley.

At the 1999 FINA World Swimming Championships (25 m) in Hong Kong she won the bronze medal in the 400 m individual medley. At the 1998 European Short Course Swimming Championships in Sheffield she won silver in the 200 m breaststroke and bronze in the 400 m individual medley.

She started to swim at 10 years old, in the Club Natació Sabadell, her only ever club.
