= Chen Yan (swimmer, born 1981) =

Chinese swimmer

Personal information
- Full name: Chen Yan
- Nationality: China
- Born: March 27, 1981 (age 45) Dalian, Liaoning, China

Sport
- Sport: Swimming
- Strokes: Individual medley
Medal record
Women's swimming
Representing China
World Championships (LC)
| Gold medal – first place | 1998 Perth | 400 m freestyle |
| Gold medal – first place | 1998 Perth | 400 m medley |
| Silver medal – second place | 1998 Perth | 200 m medley |
World Championships (SC)
| Gold medal – first place | 1997 Gothenburg | 4×200 m freestyle |
Asian Games
| Silver medal – second place | 1998 Bangkok | 200 m medley |
| Bronze medal – third place | 1998 Bangkok | 400 m medley |

Chen Yan (simplified Chinese: 陈妍; traditional Chinese: 陳妍; pinyin: Chén Yán; born March 27, 1981, in Dalian, Liaoning) is a retired Chinese swimmer. She won Gold medal at 4×200m freestyle at 1997 FINA Short Course World Championships. Later that year at Chinese National Games, she broke world record at 400m individual medley. She then won 400m individual medley and 400m freestyle at 1998 Perth World Aquatics Championships. She participated in 1996 and 2000 two Olympic Games but did not medal. Not to be confused with Chen Yan (swimmer, born 1979), she has never tested positive in any drug test.

She started college in China and transferred to UH Manoa in 2002 as a sophomore. She earned her BS in 3 years, and swam on an Athlete Full Scholarship. She has recently completed a master's degree at UH and has been working in recreation management. She was the head coach for Punahou Aquatics in Honolulu, HI. She resigned on May 20, 2016, and is now a real-estate broker for Aloha Properties.

== Personal Bests ==
In long course

- 400m medley: 4:34.79 World Record (October 13, 1997)
- 400m freestyle: 4:05.00 Asian Record (October 17, 1997)
- 800m freestyle: 8:27.94 Asian Record (October 20, 1997)

Records
| Preceded by (East Germany) Petra Schneider | Women's 400 metre individual medley world record holder (long course); October 13, 1997 – September 16, 2000 | Succeeded by (Ukraine) Yana Klochkova |
