= Pavla Chrástová =

Czech swimmer (born 1979)

Personal information
- Full name: Pavla Chrástová
- Nationality: Czech Republic
- Born: 14 March 1979 (age 47) Znojmo, Czechoslovakia
- Height: 1.76 m (5 ft 9 1/2 in)
- Weight: 68 kg (150 lb)

Sport
- Sport: Swimming
- Strokes: Medley
- Club: TJ Znojmo
Medal record
European Championships (SC)
Bronze medal – third place	1996 Rostock	400 m medley

Pavla Chrástová (born 14 March 1979) is a retired female medley swimmer from the Czech Republic, who competed for her native country at the 1996 Olympic Games in Atlanta, Georgia.
