= Emma Johnson (swimmer) =

Australian swimmer (born 1980)

Personal information
- Full name: Emma Clare Johnson
- National team: Australia
- Born: 24 February 1980 (age 46) Sydney, New South Wales
- Height: 1.79 m (5 ft 10 in)
- Weight: 72 kg (159 lb)

Sport
- Sport: Swimming
- Strokes: Freestyle, medley
Medal record
Women's swimming
Representing Australia
Olympic Games
| Bronze medal – third place | 1996 Atlanta | 4×200 m freestyle |
World Championships (SC)
| Gold medal – first place | 1997 Gothenburg | 400 m medley |
| Bronze medal – third place | 1997 Gothenburg | 4×200 m freestyle |
Pan Pacific Swimming Championships
| Silver medal – second place | 1995 Atlanta | 4×200 m freestyle |

Emma Clare Johnson (born 24 February 1980) is an Australian freestyle and medley swimmer of the 1990s, who won a bronze medal in the 4×200-metre freestyle relay at the 1996 Summer Olympics in Atlanta, Georgia, at the age of just 16 (whilst attending the Presbyterian Ladies' College, Sydney as a boarder).

She combined with Susie O'Neill, Julia Greville and Nicole Stevenson to register a bronze medal in the 4×200-metre freestyle relay, trailing the American and German teams home. She finished fifth in the 400-metre individual medley, and 9th and 10th respectively in the 200-metre individual medley and 400-metre freestyle in individual events at the same Olympics.

Emma won the 400-metre individual medley at the 1997 World Short Course Championships in Sweden. She represented Australia at the 1998 World Championships in Perth, and the 1995 and 1999 Pan Pacific Championships. She retired from competitive swimming in 2000.

Johnson completed a Bachelor of Law and Bachelor of Psychology at the Australian National University (ANU) in 2005.

== See also ==
- List of Olympic medalists in swimming (women)
