= Mirjana Boševska =

Macedonian swimmer (born 1981)

Personal information
- Full name: Мирјана Бошевска
- Nationality: North Macedonia
- Born: June 25, 1981 (age 45) Skopje
- Height: 1.70 m (5 ft 7 in)
- Weight: 59 kg (130 lb)

Sport
- Sport: Swimming
- Strokes: Freestyle and medley
- Club: Trinity Aquatic Club; Orlando, Florida
- College team: University of Virginia (1998-2002)
- Coach: Bill Peak (Trinity Aquatic); Mark Bernardino (U. Virginia)

Mirjana Boševska (born June 25, 1981, in Skopje) is a retired female freestyle and medley swimmer from Macedonia, who competed for the University of Virginia, and became the first woman to represent Macedonia at the Olympics, competing for her country in the 1996 Atlanta and 2000 Sydney games.

Boševska was born June 25, 1981, in Skopje, North Macedonia and attended Trinity High School in Orlando, Florida, graduating around 1998. From 1995 to 1996, during her Sophomore year at Trinity, she was trained by ASCA Hall of Fame Coach Bill Peak who coached her at the Trinity Aquatic Club. Skilled in training elite stroke competitors, Peak had formerly coached 1984 Olympic triple gold butterfly medalist Mary T. Meagher for five years during her youth at Lakeside Swim Club, and later helped prepare her for the 2008 Olympics. Benefitting from her training at Trinity Aquatics, at 14 at the Charlotte Ultra Swim in June 1996, Boševska won the 400 Individual Medley, placed second in the 800 freestyle, placed second in the mile, third in the 200 Individual Medley, fourth in the 400 freestyle, ninth in the 200 butterfly, and tenth in the 200 freestyle. She was the meet's leading point scorer, and as a high achieving multi-stroke competitor, outperformed American Olympians Trina Jackson, Brook Bennett, Catherine Fox and Jenny Thompson. Her one-mile swim time of 16:43.89, was the world's fourth fastest behind elite American Olympic swimmers Brooke Bennett, Janet Evans, and Australia's Haley Lewis.

== University of Virginia ==
Boševska attended the University of Virginia in the Atlantic Coast Conference and competed on their Women's Swim team in Division I NCAA competition under long serving coach Mark Bernardino. An accomplished swimming team, the Women's Cavaliers were ACC Champions in 1998 and 1999 during Bosevska's tenure. In 1999, Bernardino was an ACC Coach of the year. Achieving as a Junior at Virginia in the three day Cavalier Invitational in December 2001, Bosevska won the 200-meter butterfly, with a time of 2:01.44. While competing for the Women's Cavalier, Bosevska was a first team All-American in four successive years.

== Olympics ==
She twice competed for her native country at the Summer Olympics. In the 1996 Atlanta Olympics, she placed 22nd in the 400-and 800-meter freestyles, and 23rd in the 400 meter individual medley. At the 2000 Sydney Olympics, she placed 18th in the 200 meter freestyle, 20th in the 200 meter butterfly, and 17th in the 400 meter Individual Medley.

== Honors ==
As a Virginia Senior in 2002, Boševska was honored as an Atlantic Coast Conference Women's Swimmer of the Year, with her Coach Mark Bernardino again being honored as the ACC men's Coach of the Year.
