= Nicole Hetzer =

German swimmer

Personal information
- Born: February 18, 1979 (age 47) Leipzig, Saxony, East Germany
- Height: 1.76 m (5 ft 9 in)
- Weight: 63 kg (139 lb)

Sport
- Sport: Swimming
- Strokes: Medley
- Club: Sportverein Wacker Burghausen
Medal record
World Championships (SC)
Silver medal – second place	2000 Athens	400 m medley
European Championships (LC)
Silver medal – second place	2006 Budapest	400 m medley
Bronze medal – third place	2002 Berlin	400 m medley
European Championships (SC)
Gold medal – first place	2001 Antwerp	400 m medley
Silver medal – second place	1998 Sheffield	200 m medley
Silver medal – second place	1998 Sheffield	400 m medley
Silver medal – second place	1999 Lisbon	400 m medley
Silver medal – second place	2001 Antwerp	200 m medley
Universiade
Bronze medal – third place	2005 Izmir	200 m medley
Bronze medal – third place	2005 Izmir	400 m medley

Nicole Hetzer (born February 18, 1979) is a German retired female medley swimmer.

== Swimming career ==
Hetzer competed twice for her native country at the Summer Olympics: 2000 and 2004. Hetzer collected several medals at international tournaments in the late 1990s and early 2000s, especially in the short course (25 metres). Despite being of German nationality she won the 400 metres medley title in 1997 at the ASA National British Championships.
