= Elizabeth Warden (swimmer) =

Canadian swimmer

Personal information
- Full name: Elizabeth Warden
- National team: Canada
- Born: February 3, 1978 (age 48) Scarborough, Ontario
- Height: 1.70 m (5 ft 7 in)
- Weight: 57 kg (126 lb)

Sport
- Sport: Swimming
- Strokes: Backstroke, medley
- College team: University of Toronto
Medal record
Women's swimming
Representing Canada
Commonwealth Games
| Silver medal – second place | 1998 Kuala Lumpur | 400 m medley |

Elizabeth Warden (born February 3, 1978) is a Canadian former competitive swimmer who specialized in backstroke and individual medley events. She won a silver medal in the 400-metre individual medley at the 1998 Commonwealth Games in Kuala Lumpur, Malaysia, with a time of 4:47.69. Warden was also a member of the swimming team, and a graduate of the University of Toronto.

Warden qualified for three swimming events at the 2004 Summer Olympics in Athens, by attaining an A-standard entry time of 2:13.60 in the 200-metre individual medley from the Canadian national championships in Victoria, British Columbia. On the first day of the competition, Warden placed second behind Hungary's Éva Risztov in the third heat of the women's 400-metre individual medley, with a time of 4:46.27. In the 200-metre individual medley, Warden failed to qualify for the final, as she finished fifteenth overall in the semifinal run, in a second slowest time of 2:17.32. In her third event, 200-metre backstroke, Warden missed two places in the semifinals, by 0.76 of a second behind Croatia's Sanja Jovanović, on the morning's preliminary heats with a time of 2:15.77.
