= Yseult Gervy =

Belgian swimmer (born 1979)

Personal information
- Born: 20 January 1979 (age 47) Nivelles, Belgium
- Height: 1.73 m (5 ft 8 in)
- Weight: 60 kg (130 lb)

Sport
- Club: Cercle de Natation Bruxelles Atalante
Medal record
Women's swimming
Representing Belgium
European Championships
Bronze medal – third place	2000 Helsinki	400 m medley

Yseult Gervy (born 20 January 1979) is a retired Belgian swimmer who won the bronze medal in the 400 m medley at the 2000 European Aquatics Championships. She also competed in the 1996 and 2000 Summer Olympics in the 100 m and 200 m backstroke, 200 m and 400 m medley, and 4 × 200 m freestyle relay events. Her best Olympic achievement was 12th place in the relay.

Gervy had serious health problems in the early 2001 that forced her to retire in 2002. Before the retirement she was trained by her brother at the club Cercle de Natation Bruxelles Atalante. Between 1994 and 2000 she won 20 national titles and set 17 national records.
