= Hana Černá =

Czech swimmer

Personal information
- Full name: Hana Černá
- Nationality: Czech Republic
- Born: May 17, 1974 (age 52) Brno, Jihomoravský
- Height: 1.72 m (5 ft 8 in)
- Weight: 60 kg (132 lb)

Sport
- Sport: Swimming
- Strokes: Medley and freestyle
- Club: Športovný Klub Policie Kometa Brno
Medal record
European Championships (LC)
Bronze medal – third place	1993 Sheffield	400 m medley
Bronze medal – third place	1997 Seville	400 m medley
Bronze medal – third place	1999 Istanbul	400 m medley
European Championships (SC)
Gold medal – first place	1998 Sheffield	400 m medley
Bronze medal – third place	1999 Lisbon	400 m medley
Summer Universiade
Gold medal – first place	1999 Mallorca	400 m freestyle
Gold medal – first place	1999 Mallorc	400 m medley
Silver medal – second place	1993 Buffalo	400 m medley
Silver medal – second place	1997 Messina	400 m medley
Bronze medal – third place	2001 Beijing	400 m medley

Hana Černá (born May 17, 1974 in Brno, Jihomoravský) is a retired female freestyle and medley swimmer from the Czech Republic. She competed in three consecutive Summer Olympics, starting in 1992 for Czechoslovakia.
