= Oxana Verevka =

Ukrainian swimmer (born 1977)

Personal information
- Born: 22 November 1977 (age 48)
Medal record
Women's swimming
Representing Russia
European Championships (LC)
Gold medal – first place	1997 Seville	200 m medley
World Championships (SC)
Bronze medal – third place	1999 Hong Kong	100 m medley
Bronze medal – third place	2002 Moscow	200 m medley
European Championships (SC)
Silver medal – second place	2000 Valencia	200 m medley
Bronze medal – third place	2001 Antwerp	100 m medley

Oksana Aleksandrovna Verevka (Russian: Оксана Александровна Веревка; born 22 November 1977 in Chernihiv, Ukraine) is a retired medley swimmer from Russia. She twice competed at the Summer Olympics (2000 and 2004), and is best known for winning the gold medal in the women's 200 m individual medley at the 1997 European Championships (LC).
