= Sabine Herbst =

German swimmer

Personal information
- Full name: Sabine Herbst-Klenz
- Nationality: Germany
- Born: 27 June 1974 (age 52) Leipzig, East Germany
- Height: 1.78 m (5 ft 10 in)
- Weight: 75 kg (165 lb)

Sport
- Sport: Swimming
- Strokes: Medley and butterfly
- Club: SSV Leutzsch
Medal record
World Championships (SC)
| Silver medal – second place | 1997 Gothenburg | 400 m medley |
European Championships (LC)
| Silver medal – second place | 1991 Athens | 200 m butterfly |
| Bronze medal – third place | 1999 Istanbul | 200 m medley |
European Championships (SC)
| Gold medal – first place | 1996 Rostock | 400 m medley |
| Bronze medal – third place | 1996 Rostock | 100 m medley |
| Bronze medal – third place | 1996 Rostock | 200 m medley |
Summer Universiade
| Silver medal – second place | 1999 Mallorca | 200 m medley |

Sabine Herbst-Klenz, (née Klenz; born 27 June 1974, in Leipzig, Sachsen) is a retired female swimmer from Germany. She had competed in medley swimming and the butterfly stroke. She had twice competed for Germany at the Summer Olympics, in 1996 and in 2000. Sabine Herbst is the daughter of Olympians Eva Wittke and Jochen Herbst, the sister of swimmer Stefan Herbst, and the mother of swimmer Ramon Klenz.
