= Elizabeth Van Welie =

New Zealand swimmer

Personal information
- Born: 17 November 1979 (age 46)
Medal record
Women's swimming
Representing New Zealand
Commonwealth Games
Silver medal – second place	2002 Manchester	400m medley

Elizabeth Jelaine Van Welie (born 17 November 1979 in Dunedin, New Zealand) is a former swimmer from New Zealand. She competed at the 2000 Summer Olympics, and at the 2002 Commonwealth Games where she won a silver medal in the women's 400m individual medley.

At the 2000 Summer Olympics, Van Welie qualified for the semifinals in the Women's 200 metre butterfly event.
