= Maddy Crippen =

American swimmer (born 1980)

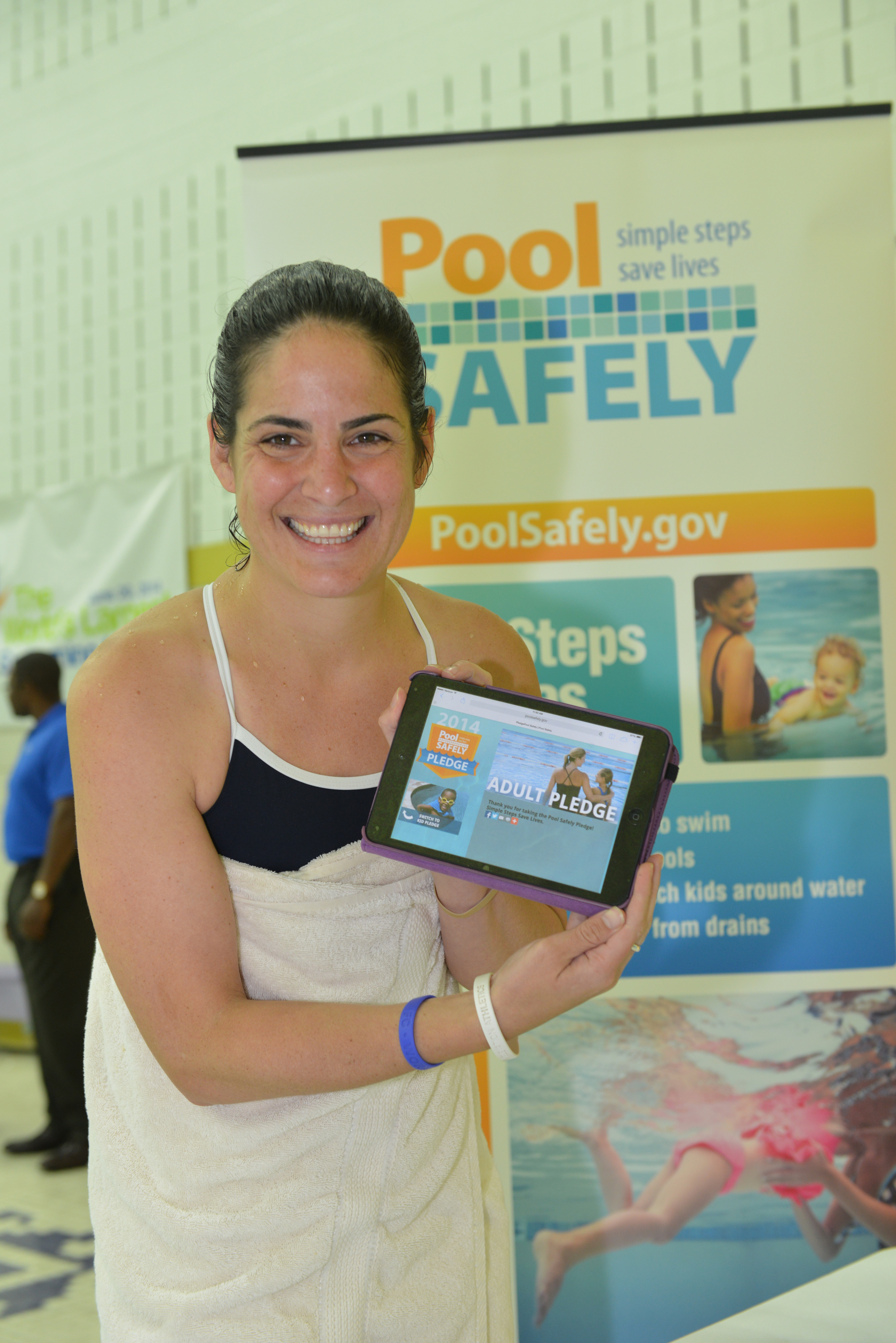
- Crippen in 2014

Personal information
- Full name: Madeleine Marie Crippen
- Nickname: "Maddy"
- National team: United States
- Born: July 10, 1980 (age 45) Conshohocken, Pennsylvania, U.S.
- Height: 5 ft 7 in (1.70 m)
- Weight: 141 lb (64 kg)

Sport
- Sport: Swimming
- Strokes: Individual medley
- Club: Germantown Academy Aquatic Club
- College team: Villanova University
- Coach: Dick Shoulberg; Germantown Academy
Medal record
Women's swimming
Representing the United States
Pan Pacific Championships
Silver medal – second place	1997 Fukuoka	400 m medley

Madeleine Marie Crippen (born July 10, 1980), also known by her married name as Madeleine Plankey, is an American former competition swimmer. Crippen represented the United States at the 2000 Summer Olympics.

== Career ==
In 1997 Crippen earned a silver medal as a part of Team USA at the Pan Pacific Championship in Fukuoka, Japan. She followed that performance with a fifth-place finish in the 400-meter individual medley and a sixth-place finish in the 200-meter individual medley at the 1998 World Aquatics Championships in Perth, Australia. She represented the United States at the Pan Pacific Championships in 1999 where she placed fourth in the 400-meter individual medley.

Crippen earned a spot on the 2000 Olympic Team by placing second in the 400-meter individual medley at the U.S. Olympic Trials. In the 2000 Summer Olympics, she placed sixth in the event. Following her Olympic showing, Crippen competed at the 2002 Pan Pacific Championships and 2003 World Championships in Barcelona, Spain. Crippen is a three-time U.S. national champion, winning two national titles in the 400-meter individual medley and one in the 200-meter breaststroke. Her 2000 Olympic Coaches included Hall of Fame Coach Dick Shoulberg, who was an Advisory Women's Coach to the games that year.

While attending Villanova University, she swam for the Villanova Wildcats swimming and diving team in National Collegiate Athletic Association (NCAA) and Big East Conference competition. During her college swimming career, Crippen won an NCAA championship in the 400-yard individual medley and ten Big East championships, and was named Big East "Swimmer of the Year" in 1999 and 2001. She was named Villanova "Swimmer of the Year" in 1999, 2001 and 2002. In 2019, Maddy was inducted into the Villanova Athletic Hall of Fame.

== Personal life ==
Crippen is the daughter of Peter and Patrica Crippen. She, her late brother Fran, and sisters Teresa and Claire were all members of the Germantown Academy swim team and swam for coach Richard "Dick" Shoulberg; all four have qualified for the U.S. Olympic Team Trials in swimming. Her brother Fran won a bronze in the 10-kilometer open water race at the 2009 World Aquatics Championships. He swam for the University of Virginia where he was an 11-time All-American and two-time Atlantic Coast Conference (ACC) swimmer of the year in 2006 and 2008. He died on October 23, 2010, due to exhaustion after he did not pass the line during a race with inadequate safety measures. Her sister, Claire Crippen, is a national finalist, an NCAA All-American, and swam for the University of Virginia. Her sister Teresa is a Pan American Games Champion in the 200-meter backstroke and was a U.S. National Team member, competing at the 2011 FINA World Championships in Shanghai, CN; Teresa swam for the University of Florida.

Crippen retired from swimming in 2004, and works as a marketing professional. She was a member of USA Swimming's board of directors and the Athletes Executive Committee.

Crippen is married to Sean Plankey, a commander in the U.S. Coast Guard.
