= Jennifer Reilly =

Australian swimmer

Personal information
- Full name: Jennifer Louise Reilly
- National team: Australia
- Born: 6 July 1983 (age 43) Geraldton, Western Australia
- Height: 1.74 m (5 ft 9 in)
- Weight: 79 kg (174 lb)

Sport
- Sport: Swimming
- Strokes: Medley
Medal record
Women's swimming
Representing Australia
Pan Pacific Championships
Gold medal – first place	2002 Yokohama	400 m medley
Commonwealth Games
Gold medal – first place	2002 Manchester	400 m medley
Silver medal – second place	2002 Manchester	200 m medley
Bronze medal – third place	1998 Kuala Lumpur	400 m medley
Bronze medal – third place	2006 Melbourne	400 m medley

Jennifer Louise Reilly (born 6 July 1983) is an Australian medley swimmer.

== Career ==
Reilly, born in Geraldton, Western Australia, and growing up in Perth, Western Australia, was a strong junior swimmer winning four gold and two silver medals at the 1998 Australian Age Championships and later that year at the 1998 Commonwealth Games in Kuala Lumpur, at the age of 15, won her first international medal with third in the 400-metre individual medley.

At the 1999 FINA Short Course World Championships in Hong Kong she finished fourth in final of the 400-metre individual medley. Later in August at the 1999 Pan Pacific Swimming Championships in Sydney she was finished fifth in the same event.

In 2000, after now competing in three international meets, she continued her great form at Australian Age Championships picking up three gold and two silver medals. At the Australian Championships and Olympic Selection Trails she won the 400 metre individual medley beating both Rachel Harris and Hayley Lewis home to qualify for first Olympics. At the 2000 Summer Olympics itself, she finished eighth in the final.

At the 2001 Australian Age Championships she added another four gold and two silver medals. However, she did not perform as well at the 2001 FINA World Championships in Fukuoka, Japan as she would have liked, finishing ninth in the 400-metre individual medley and eleventh in the 200-metre individual medley.

2002 was by far and away her best year to date. In April, at the FINA Short Course World Championships, she finished fifth in the 400-metre individual medley, eighth in 200-metre individual medley and 15th in 800-metre freestyle event. At the Australia Championships in Brisbane she took out the 400-metre individual medley for the fourth consecutive year and for first time was crowned the Australian Champion in the 200-metre individual medley. In July, at the 2002 Commonwealth Games in Manchester, England, she won first gold medal in an international meet taking out the 400 metre individual medley in a time of 4 mins 43.59 sec. To complement this she also won silver the 200-metre individual medley and finished fourth in the 800 metre freestyle event. She backed this up in August, at the 2002 Pan Pacific Swimming Championships in Yokohama, Japan, winning gold in the 400-metre individual medley in a time of 4 min 40.84 sec.

In April 2003 at the inaugural Mutual of Omaha Duel in the Pool in Indianapolis, Indiana, she won silver the 400-metre individual medley. At the 2003–04 FINA Swimming World Cup event in Melbourne, she won the 400-metre individual medley. At the Australian Short Course Championships in Hobart she took the silver medal in both the 200 and the 400-metre individual medley. In July, at the 2003 FINA World Championships, she improved by one position on her result in 2001, finishing eighth in 400-metre individual medley.

At the 2004 Australian Championships and Olympic Selection Trails she won the 400 metre individual medley event for the sixth consecutive year and in process broke the broke Australian record in a time of 4 mins 40.71 sec. She also finished fourth in the 800 metre freestyle and seventh in the 200 metre individual medley. At the Olympics itself, she failed to make the final of 400 metre individual medley, finishing 19th overall.

In March 2005, at the Australian Championships and World Championships Selection Trails, after qualifying fastest in the heats of 400-metre individual medley, she had to withdraw from the final meaning she was unable qualify for the 2005 FINA World Championships in Montreal, Canada. Lara Carroll was crowned the Australian Champion in the event, the first time in seven years that someone other than Reilly had won the event. In August, at the Australian Short Course Championships and World Short Course Championships Selection Trails in Melbourne, she finished behind Carroll to take silver in 400-metre individual medley. However, silver wasn't enough to make the squad for 2006 FINA Short Course World Championships in Shanghai, China.

In February 2006, at the Australian Championships and Commonwealth Games Selection Trails, Reilly claimed back her 400-metre individual medley national crown from Lara Carroll and in process earned the chance to defend her Commonwealth title. She also finished fourth in 200-metre individual medley and seventh in 200-metre breaststroke events. In March at the 2006 Commonwealth Games in Melbourne, Australia, she was unable to retain her title as 400-metre individual medley Commonwealth Champion, touching the wall after Stephanie Rice and Rebecca Cooke. In August at the 2006 Pan Pacific Swimming Championships in Victoria, British Columbia, Canada, she failed to the make the final of the 400-metre individual medley finishing 12th overall.

In December 2006, at the 2007 Australian Championships and World Championships Selection Trails in Brisbane, Reilly took out, for the eighth time in nine years, the 400 metre individual medley event and in the process breaking her own national record by more than two seconds, stopping the clock at 4 mins 38.62 sec. This result also meant she qualified for the 2007 FINA World Championships to commence on 17 March 2007 in Melbourne.

== See also ==
- List of Commonwealth Games medallists in swimming (women)
