= Swimming at the 1998 Asian Games =

- Venue: Thammasat Aquatic Center
- Dates: 7–12 December 1998

Swimming was contested from December 7 to December 19 at the 1998 Asian Games in Bangkok, Thailand.

== Schedule ==
H	Heats	F	Final

Event↓/Date →	7th Mon		8th Tue		9th Wed		10th Thu		11th Fri		12th Sat	
Men's 50 m freestyle									H	F		
Men's 100 m freestyle					H	F						
Men's 200 m freestyle	H	F										
Men's 400 m freestyle							H	F				
Men's 1500 m freestyle											F	
Men's 100 m backstroke									H	F		
Men's 200 m backstroke					H	F						
Men's 100 m breaststroke	H	F										
Men's 200 m breaststroke							H	F				
Men's 100 m butterfly			H	F								
Men's 200 m butterfly									H	F		
Men's 200 m individual medley											H	F
Men's 400 m individual medley			H	F								
Men's 4 × 100 m freestyle relay							H	F				
Men's 4 × 200 m freestyle relay			H	F								
Men's 4 × 100 m medley relay											H	F
Women's 50 m freestyle											H	F
Women's 100 m freestyle	H	F										
Women's 200 m freestyle			H	F								
Women's 400 m freestyle					H	F						
Women's 800 m freestyle									F			
Women's 100 m backstroke					H	F						
Women's 200 m backstroke											H	F
Women's 100 m breaststroke							H	F				
Women's 200 m breaststroke			H	F								
Women's 100 m butterfly							H	F				
Women's 200 m butterfly											H	F
Women's 200 m individual medley									H	F		
Women's 400 m individual medley	H	F										
Women's 4 × 100 m freestyle relay					H	F						
Women's 4 × 200 m freestyle relay	F											
Women's 4 × 100 m medley relay									F			

== Medalists ==
=== Men ===
Event	Gold		Silver		Bronze	
50 m freestyle	Jiang Chengji; China	22.38; GR	Tomohiro Yamanoi; Japan	23.26	Hirosuke Hamano; Japan	23.43
100 m freestyle	Shunsuke Ito; Japan	51.29	Shusuke Ito; Japan	52.07	Zhao Lifeng; China	52.21
100 m freestyle	Shunsuke Ito; Japan	51.29	Shusuke Ito; Japan	52.07	Huang Chih-yung; Chinese Taipei	52.21
100 m freestyle	Shunsuke Ito; Japan	51.29	Shusuke Ito; Japan	52.07	Igor Sitnikov; Kazakhstan	52.21
200 m freestyle	Yosuke Ichikawa; Japan	1:52.46	Torlarp Sethsothorn; Thailand	1:52.53	Shusuke Ito; Japan	1:52.81
400 m freestyle	Torlarp Sethsothorn; Thailand	3:53.61; GR	Masato Hirano; Japan	3:54.13	Mark Kwok; Hong Kong	4:00.44
1500 m freestyle	Masato Hirano; Japan	15:22.20; GR	Torlarp Sethsothorn; Thailand	15:40.17	Hisham Al-Masri; Syria	15:51.60
100 m backstroke	Alex Lim; Malaysia	55.53; GR	Fu Yong; China	56.40	Raymond Papa; Philippines	56.83
200 m backstroke	Fu Yong; China	1:59.30; GR	Alex Lim; Malaysia	2:00.94	Raymond Papa; Philippines	2:01.80
100 m breaststroke	Zeng Qiliang; China	1:02.32	Akira Hayashi; Japan	1:02.55	Elvin Chia; Malaysia	1:03.09
200 m breaststroke	Zhu Yi; China	2:16.26	Ratapong Sirisanont; Thailand	2:16.47	Yoshinobu Miyazaki; Japan	2:16.97
100 m butterfly	Takashi Yamamoto; Japan	53.34; GR	Zhang Xiao; China	54.40	Han Kyu-chul; South Korea	54.83
200 m butterfly	Takashi Yamamoto; Japan	1:56.75; GR	Xie Xufeng; China	1:59.67	Han Kyu-chul; South Korea	2:00.46
200 m individual medley	Xiong Guoming; China	2:03.34; GR	Jo Yoshimi; Japan	2:04.93	Xie Xufeng; China	2:05.45
400 m individual medley	Takahiro Mori; Japan	4:20.98	Xiong Guoming; China	4:22.57	Ratapong Sirisanont; Thailand	4:24.15
4 × 100 m freestyle relay	Japan; Hirosuke Hamano; Shunsuke Ito; Tomohiro Yamanoi; Shusuke Ito	3:25.53	China; Wang Chuan; Deng Qingsong; Zhang Qiang; Zhao Lifeng	3:25.86	Kazakhstan; Igor Sitnikov; Sergey Borisenko; Pavel Sidorov; Andrey Kvassov	3:28.53
4 × 200 m freestyle relay	Japan; Hideaki Hara; Shunsuke Ito; Shusuke Ito; Yosuke Ichikawa	7:30.53	China; Wang Chuan; Du Jie; Xiong Guoming; Deng Qingsong	7:34.11	South Korea; Kim Bang-hyun; Woo Chul; Koh Yun-ho; Han Kyu-chul	7:36.07
4 × 100 m medley relay	Japan; Atsushi Nishikori; Akira Hayashi; Takashi Yamamoto; Shunsuke Ito	3:41.98	China; Fu Yong; Zeng Qiliang; Zhang Xiao; Deng Qingsong	3:44.40	Kazakhstan; Pavel Sidorov; Alexandr Savitskiy; Andrey Gavrilov; Igor Sitnikov	3:51.13

=== Women ===
Event	Gold		Silver		Bronze	
50 m freestyle	Shan Ying; China	25.88	Han Xue; China	26.04	Sumika Minamoto; Japan	26.08
100 m freestyle	Shan Ying; China	56.20	Sumika Minamoto; Japan	56.39	Shared silver	
100 m freestyle	Shan Ying; China	56.20	Chao Na; China	56.39	Shared silver	
200 m freestyle	Tsai Shu-min; Chinese Taipei	2:00.89	Qin Caini; China	2:01.75	Sachiko Yamada; Japan	2:03.14
400 m freestyle	Chen Hua; China	4:12.31; GR	Sachiko Yamada; Japan	4:14.53	Tsai Shu-min; Chinese Taipei	4:15.66
800 m freestyle	Chen Hua; China	8:38.00	Sachiko Yamada; Japan	8:39.21	Eri Yamanoi; Japan	8:56.90
100 m backstroke	Tomoko Hagiwara; Japan	1:01.84	Mai Nakamura; Japan	1:02.11	Choi Soo-min; South Korea	1:03.37
200 m backstroke	Tomoko Hagiwara; Japan	2:12.25	Mai Nakamura; Japan	2:14.79	Shim Min-ji; South Korea	2:16.46
100 m breaststroke	Li Wei; China	1:08.95; GR	Xu Shan; China	1:10.00	Masami Tanaka; Japan	1:10.30
200 m breaststroke	Masami Tanaka; Japan	2:28.44	Qi Hui; China	2:28.71	Junko Isoda; Japan	2:32.39
100 m butterfly	Ayari Aoyama; Japan	59.44	Ruan Yi; China	1:00.57	Hitomi Kashima; Japan	1:00.87
200 m butterfly	Cho Hee-yeon; South Korea	2:11.34	Ruan Yi; China	2:12.51	Hitomi Kashima; Japan	2:13.26
200 m individual medley	Wu Yanyan; China	2:15.12	Chen Yan; China	2:15.54	Cho Hee-yeon; South Korea	2:15.95
400 m individual medley	Yasuko Tajima; Japan	4:39.92	Wu Yanyan; China	4:46.74	Chen Yan; China	4:47.34
4 × 100 m freestyle relay	China; Shan Ying; Qian Min; Han Xue; Chao Na	3:45.51; GR	Japan; Kaori Yamada; Ayari Aoyama; Sumika Minamoto; Junko Nakatani	3:47.65	Chinese Taipei; Tsai Shu-min; Chiang Tzu-ying; Lin Chi-chan; Lin Meng-chieh	3:51.42
4 × 200 m freestyle relay	China; Qin Caini; Qian Min; Yang Lina; Chen Hua	8:08.00; GR	Japan; Junko Nakatani; Sachiko Yamada; Yasuko Tajima; Eri Yamanoi	8:12.06	Chinese Taipei; Chiang Tzu-ying; Lin Chi-chan; Kuan Chia-hsien; Tsai Shu-min	8:18.92
4 × 100 m medley relay	Japan; Tomoko Hagiwara; Masami Tanaka; Ayari Aoyama; Sumika Minamoto	4:06.70; GR	China; Wu Yanyan; Li Wei; Ruan Yi; Shan Ying	4:08.54	South Korea; Shim Min-ji; Kye Yoon-hee; Cho Hee-yeon; Lee Bo-eun	4:15.03

== Medal table ==
Rank	Nation	Gold	Silver	Bronze	Total
1	Japan (JPN)	15	12	10	37
2	China (CHN)	13	17	3	33
3	Thailand (THA)	1	3	1	5
4	Malaysia (MAS)	1	1	1	3
5	South Korea (KOR)	1	0	7	8
6	Chinese Taipei (TPE)	1	0	4	5
7	Kazakhstan (KAZ)	0	0	3	3
8	Philippines (PHI)	0	0	2	2
9	Hong Kong (HKG)	0	0	1	1
9	Syria (SYR)	0	0	1	1
Totals (10 entries)		32	33	33	98
