= Swimming at the Asian Games =

- Governing bodies: AQUA (World) / AA (Asia)
- Events: 41 (men: 20; women: 20; mixed: 1)

Games
- 1951; 1954; 1958; 1962; 1966; 1970; 1974; 1978; 1982; 1986; 1990; 1994; 1998; 2002; 2006; 2010; 2014; 2018; 2022; 2026
- Medalists; Records

Swimming has been a regular Asian Games sport since the first edition in 1951. Swimming has been the most gold medal sport event next to Athletics, with 41 of 465 gold medals in 2018 edition.

As of the last edition of the Games held in 2023, China is the most successful team in this sport event, with South Korea following in second place. Singapore was the best nation in the inaugural event, and are now fourth in terms of gold medals won.

== Editions ==
| Games | Year | Host city | Best nation |
|---|---|---|---|
| 1 | 1951 | New Delhi, India | Singapore |
| 2 | 1954 | Manila, Philippines | Japan |
| 3 | 1958 | Tokyo, Japan | Japan |
| 4 | 1962 | Jakarta, Indonesia | Japan |
| 5 | 1966 | Bangkok, Thailand | Japan |
| 6 | 1970 | Bangkok, Thailand | Japan |
| 7 | 1974 | Tehran, Iran | Japan |
| 8 | 1978 | Bangkok, Thailand | Japan |
| 9 | 1982 | New Delhi, India | Japan |
| 10 | 1986 | Seoul, South Korea | Japan |
| 11 | 1990 | Beijing, China | China |
| 12 | 1994 | Hiroshima, Japan | China |
| 13 | 1998 | Bangkok, Thailand | Japan |
| 14 | 2002 | Busan, South Korea | China |
| 15 | 2006 | Doha, Qatar | China |
| 16 | 2010 | Guangzhou, China | China |
| 17 | 2014 | Incheon, South Korea | China |
| 18 | 2018 | Jakarta, Indonesia | Japan |
| 19 | 2022 | Hangzhou, China | China |
| 20 | 2026 | Tokyo, Japan | China |

== Events ==
| Event | 51 | 54 | 58 | 62 | 66 | 70 | 74 | 78 | 82 | 86 | 90 | 94 | 98 | 02 | 06 | 10 | 14 | 18 | 22 | 26 | Years |
Men
| 50 m freestyle | | | | | | | | | | | X | X | X | X | X | X | X | X | X | X | 10 |
| 100 m freestyle | X | X | X | X | X | X | X | X | X | X | X | X | X | X | X | X | X | X | X | X | 20 |
| 200 m freestyle | | | X | X | X | X | X | X | X | X | X | X | X | X | X | X | X | X | X | X | 18 |
| 400 m freestyle | X | X | X | X | X | X | X | X | X | X | X | X | X | X | X | X | X | X | X | X | 20 |
| 800 m freestyle | X | | | | | | | | | | | | | | | | | X | X | X | 4 |
| 1500 m freestyle | X | X | X | X | X | X | X | X | X | X | X | X | X | X | X | X | X | X | X | X | 20 |
| 50 m backstroke | | | | | | | | | | | | | | | X | X | X | X | X | X | 6 |
| 100 m backstroke | X | X | X | X | X | X | X | X | X | X | X | X | X | X | X | X | X | X | X | X | 20 |
| 200 m backstroke | | | X | X | X | X | X | X | X | X | X | X | X | X | X | X | X | X | X | X | 18 |
| 50 m breaststroke | | | | | | | | | | | | | | | X | X | X | X | X | X | 6 |
| 100 m breaststroke | | | X | X | X | X | X | X | X | X | X | X | X | X | X | X | X | X | X | X | 18 |
| 200 m breaststroke | X | X | X | X | X | X | X | X | X | X | X | X | X | X | X | X | X | X | X | X | 20 |
| 50 m butterfly | | | | | | | | | | | | | | | X | X | X | X | X | X | 6 |
| 100 m butterfly | | | X | X | X | X | X | X | X | X | X | X | X | X | X | X | X | X | X | X | 18 |
| 200 m butterfly | | X | X | X | X | X | X | X | X | X | X | X | X | X | X | X | X | X | X | X | 19 |
| 200 m individual medley | | | | | | | X | X | X | X | X | X | X | X | X | X | X | X | X | X | 14 |
| 400 m individual medley | | | | | X | X | X | X | X | X | X | X | X | X | X | X | X | X | X | X | 16 |
| 4 × 100 m freestyle relay | X | | | | | X | X | X | X | X | X | X | X | X | X | X | X | X | X | X | 16 |
| 4 × 200 m freestyle relay | | X | X | X | X | X | X | X | X | X | X | X | X | X | X | X | X | X | X | X | 19 |
| 4 × 100 m medley relay | X | | X | X | X | X | X | X | X | X | X | X | X | X | X | X | X | X | X | X | 19 |
| 10 km marathon | | | | | | | | | | | | | | | | | | | X | | 1 |
Women
| 50 m freestyle | | | | | | | | | | | X | X | X | X | X | X | X | X | X | X | 10 |
| 100 m freestyle | | X | X | X | X | X | X | X | X | X | X | X | X | X | X | X | X | X | X | X | 19 |
| 200 m freestyle | | | X | X | X | X | X | X | X | X | X | X | X | X | X | X | X | X | X | X | 18 |
| 400 m freestyle | | X | X | X | X | X | X | X | X | X | X | X | X | X | X | X | X | X | X | X | 19 |
| 800 m freestyle | | | | | | | | X | X | X | X | X | X | X | X | X | X | X | X | X | 13 |
| 1500 m freestyle | | | | | | | | | | | | | | | | | | X | X | X | 3 |
| 50 m backstroke | | | | | | | | | | | | | | | X | X | X | X | X | X | 6 |
| 100 m backstroke | | X | X | X | X | X | X | X | X | X | X | X | X | X | X | X | X | X | X | X | 19 |
| 200 m backstroke | | | | | | | | X | X | X | X | X | X | X | X | X | X | X | X | X | 13 |
| 50 m breaststroke | | | | | | | | | | | | | | | X | X | X | X | X | X | 6 |
| 100 m breaststroke | | | X | X | X | X | X | X | X | X | X | X | X | X | X | X | X | X | X | X | 18 |
| 200 m breaststroke | | X | X | X | X | X | X | X | X | X | X | X | X | X | X | X | X | X | X | X | 19 |
| 50 m butterfly | | | | | | | | | | | | | | | X | X | X | X | X | X | 6 |
| 100 m butterfly | | X | X | X | X | X | X | X | X | X | X | X | X | X | X | X | X | X | X | X | 19 |
| 200 m butterfly | | | | | | | | X | X | X | X | X | X | X | X | X | X | X | X | X | 13 |
| 200 m individual medley | | | | | X | X | X | X | X | X | X | X | X | X | X | X | X | X | X | X | 16 |
| 400 m individual medley | | | | | | | | X | X | X | X | X | X | X | X | X | X | X | X | X | 13 |
| 4 × 100 m freestyle relay | | X | X | X | X | X | X | X | X | X | X | X | X | X | X | X | X | X | X | X | 19 |
| 4 × 200 m freestyle relay | | | | | | | | | | | | | X | X | X | X | X | X | X | X | 8 |
| 4 × 100 m medley relay | | | X | X | X | X | X | X | X | X | X | X | X | X | X | X | X | X | X | X | 18 |
| 10 km marathon | | | | | | | | | | | | | | | | | | | X | | 1 |
Mixed
| 4 × 100 m medley relay | | | | | | | | | | | | | | | | | | X | X | X | 3 |
| Total | 8 | 13 | 21 | 21 | 23 | 24 | 25 | 29 | 29 | 29 | 31 | 31 | 32 | 32 | 38 | 38 | 38 | 41 | 43 | 41 | 587 |

== Medal table ==
| Rank | Nation | Gold | Silver | Bronze | Total |
|---|---|---|---|---|---|
| 1 | Japan (JPN) | 289 | 286 | 191 | 766 |
| 2 | China (CHN) | 225 | 184 | 111 | 520 |
| 3 | South Korea (KOR) | 29 | 28 | 83 | 140 |
| 4 | Singapore (SGP) | 12 | 20 | 33 | 65 |
| 5 | Philippines (PHI) | 10 | 31 | 54 | 95 |
| 6 | Kazakhstan (KAZ) | 5 | 5 | 15 | 25 |
| 7 | Hong Kong (HKG) | 4 | 7 | 16 | 27 |
| 8 | Thailand (THA) | 4 | 3 | 10 | 17 |
| 9 | Chinese Taipei (TPE) | 2 | 4 | 14 | 20 |
| 10 | Syria (SYR) | 2 | 1 | 1 | 4 |
| 11 | Myanmar (MYA) | 2 | 0 | 1 | 3 |
| 12 | Malaysia (MAS) | 1 | 5 | 3 | 9 |
| 13 | Israel (ISR) | 1 | 4 | 6 | 11 |
| 14 | India (IND) | 1 | 2 | 6 | 9 |
| 15 | Uzbekistan (UZB) | 1 | 0 | 2 | 3 |
| 16 | Bahrain (BHR) | 1 | 0 | 0 | 1 |
| 17 | Indonesia (INA) | 0 | 6 | 30 | 36 |
| 18 | North Korea (PRK) | 0 | 2 | 0 | 2 |
| 19 | Vietnam (VIE) | 0 | 1 | 5 | 6 |
| 20 | Kyrgyzstan (KGZ) | 0 | 1 | 0 | 1 |
| 21 | Cambodia (CAM) | 0 | 0 | 2 | 2 |
| Totals (21 entries) | | 589 | 590 | 583 | 1,762 |
