= Swimming at the 1998 Asian Games – Women's 4 × 100 metre medley relay =

Women's 4 × 100 metre medley relay at the 1998 Asian Games
- Venue: Thammasat Aquatic Center
- Date: 11 December 1998
- Competitors: 32 from 8 nations

Medalists
gold medal	Japan; Tomoko Hagiwara, Masami Tanaka, Ayari Aoyama, Sumika Minamoto
silver medal	China; Wu Yanyan, Li Wei, Ruan Yi, Shan Ying
bronze medal	South Korea; Shim Min-ji, Kye Yoon-hee, Cho Hee-yeon, Lee Bo-eun

The women's 4 × 100 metre medley relay swimming competition at the 1998 Asian Games in Bangkok was held on 11 December at the Thammasat Aquatic Center.

== Schedule ==
All times are Indochina Time (UTC+07:00)

Date	Time	Event
Friday, 11 December 1998	18:00	Final

== Results ==
Legend

- DSQ — Disqualified

Rank	Team	Time	Notes
1st place, gold medalist(s)	Japan (JPN); Tomoko Hagiwara; Masami Tanaka; Ayari Aoyama; Sumika Minamoto	4:06.70	GR
2nd place, silver medalist(s)	China (CHN); Wu Yanyan; Li Wei; Ruan Yi; Shan Ying	4:08.54	
3rd place, bronze medalist(s)	South Korea (KOR); Shim Min-ji; Kye Yoon-hee; Cho Hee-yeon; Lee Bo-eun	4:15.03	
4	Hong Kong (HKG); Sherry Tsai; Caroline Chiu; Pamela Tung; Robyn Lamsam	4:24.75	
5	Chinese Taipei (TPE); Lin Chi-chan; Lin Fang-tzu; Hsieh Shu-tzu; Tsai Shu-min	4:28.51	
6	Singapore (SIN); May Ooi; Daphne Teo; Christel Bouvron; Joscelin Yeo	4:29.94	
7	Macau (MAC); Lam Pui Chi; Cheong Weng Lam; Lou On Kei; Lam Wai Man	4:43.76	
—	Thailand (THA); Chonlathorn Vorathamrong; Tachaporn Iamsanitamorn; Praphalsai Minpraphal; Pilin Tachakittiranan	DSQ	
