= Swimming at the 1998 Asian Games – Men's 4 × 100 metre freestyle relay =

Men's 4 × 100 metre freestyle relay at the 1998 Asian Games
- Venue: Thammasat Aquatic Center
- Date: 10 December 1998
- Competitors: 59 from 13 nations

Medalists
gold medal	Japan; Hirosuke Hamano, Shunsuke Ito, Tomohiro Yamanoi, Shusuke Ito
silver medal	China; Wang Chuan, Deng Qingsong, Zhang Qiang, Zhao Lifeng
bronze medal	Kazakhstan; Igor Sitnikov, Sergey Borisenko, Pavel Sidorov, Andrey Kvassov

The men's 4 × 100 metre freestyle relay swimming competition at the 1998 Asian Games in Bangkok was held on 10 December at the Thammasat Aquatic Center.

== Schedule ==
All times are Indochina Time (UTC+07:00)

Date	Time	Event
Thursday, 10 December 1998	09:00	Heats
Thursday, 10 December 1998	18:00	Final

== Results ==
=== Heats ===
Rank	Heat	Team	Time	Notes
1	2	China (CHN); Wang Chuan; Deng Qingsong; Zhang Qiang; Zhang Xiao	3:29.18	
2	1	Kazakhstan (KAZ); Andrey Kvassov; Igor Sitnikov; Artem Rodin; Pavel Sidorov	3:30.26	
2	2	Japan (JPN); Shusuke Ito; Hirosuke Hamano; Tomohiro Yamanoi; Takahiro Mori	3:30.26	
4	2	Uzbekistan (UZB); Oleg Tsvetkovskiy; Oleg Pukhnatiy; Aleksandr Agafonov; Petr Vasiliev	3:31.17	
5	1	Singapore (SIN); Fergus Kuek; Sng Ju Wei; Mark Chay; Kenneth Goh	3:33.10	
6	1	South Korea (KOR); Kim Min-suk; Koh Yun-ho; Park Kyong-ho; Han Kyu-chul	3:34.38	
7	2	Chinese Taipei (TPE); Huang Chih-yung; Hung Chien-chih; Wu Nien-pin; Chen Yi-chung	3:34.42	
8	1	Hong Kong (HKG); Harbeth Fu; Kwok Sze Wai; Matthew Kwok; Sun Fat Yee	3:36.67	
9	2	Thailand (THA); Arwut Chinnapasaen; Jatupat Sarikaputra; Torlarp Sethsothorn; Vicha Ratanachote	3:37.06	
10	1	United Arab Emirates (UAE); Obeid Al-Rumaithi; Khowaiter Al-Dhaheri; Ayoub Al-Mas; Ibrahim Shafee	3:45.91	
11	1	Iran (IRI); Hamid Reza Mobarrez; Pirouz Eftekhar-Manavi; Farshid Karami; Hamed Rezakhani	3:47.00	
12	2	Kuwait (KUW); Fahad Al-Otaibi; Sultan Al-Otaibi; Thamer Al-Shamroukh; Nayef Al-Hasawi	3:47.82	
13	2	Macau (MAC); Tang Chon Kit; Wu Ngou Teng; Lou Keng Ip; Lam Pui Kay	3:47.85	

=== Final ===
Rank	Team	Time	Notes
1st place, gold medalist(s)	Japan (JPN); Hirosuke Hamano; Shunsuke Ito; Tomohiro Yamanoi; Shusuke Ito	3:25.53	
2nd place, silver medalist(s)	China (CHN); Wang Chuan; Deng Qingsong; Zhang Qiang; Zhao Lifeng	3:25.86	
3rd place, bronze medalist(s)	Kazakhstan (KAZ); Igor Sitnikov; Sergey Borisenko; Pavel Sidorov; Andrey Kvassov	3:28.53	
4	Uzbekistan (UZB); Ravil Nachaev; Oleg Tsvetkovskiy; Oleg Pukhnatiy; Aleksandr Agafonov	3:28.70	
5	South Korea (KOR); Kim Min-suk; Koh Yun-ho; Park Kyong-ho; Kim Bang-hyun	3:28.86	
6	Chinese Taipei (TPE); Huang Chih-yung; Hung Chien-chih; Wu Nien-pin; Chen Yi-chung	3:30.75	
7	Singapore (SIN); Mark Chay; Sng Ju Wei; Kenneth Goh; Fergus Kuek	3:31.38	
8	Hong Kong (HKG); Zachary Moffatt; Sun Fat Yee; Kwok Sze Wai; Charles Szeto	3:42.47	
