= Swimming at the 1998 Asian Games – Women's 4 × 100 metre freestyle relay =

Women's 4 × 100 metre freestyle relay at the 1998 Asian Games
- Venue: Thammasat Aquatic Center
- Date: 9 December 1998
- Nations: 9

Medalists
gold medal	China; Shan Ying, Qian Min, Han Xue, Chao Na
silver medal	Japan; Kaori Yamada, Ayari Aoyama, Sumika Minamoto, Junko Nakatani
bronze medal	Chinese Taipei; Tsai Shu-min, Chiang Tzu-ying, Lin Chi-chan, Lin Meng-chieh

The women's 4 × 100 metre freestyle relay swimming competition at the 1998 Asian Games in Bangkok was held on 9 December at the Thammasat Aquatic Center.

== Schedule ==
All times are Indochina Time (UTC+07:00)

Date	Time	Event
Wednesday, 9 December 1998	09:00	Heats
Wednesday, 9 December 1998	18:00	Final

== Results ==
=== Heats ===
Rank	Heat	Team	Time	Notes
1	1	Japan (JPN)	3:51.73	
2	2	China (CHN)	3:55.31	
3	2	South Korea (KOR)	3:55.51	
4	1	Thailand (THA)	4:01.59	
5	2	Chinese Taipei (TPE)	4:02.39	
6	2	Singapore (SIN)	4:02.71	
7	2	India (IND)	4:08.94	
8	1	Hong Kong (HKG)	4:12.68	
9	1	Macau (MAC)	4:19.06	

=== Final ===
Rank	Team	Time	Notes
1st place, gold medalist(s)	China (CHN)	3:45.51	GR
2nd place, silver medalist(s)	Japan (JPN)	3:47.65	
3rd place, bronze medalist(s)	Chinese Taipei (TPE)	3:51.42	
4	South Korea (KOR)	3:52.24	
5	Singapore (SIN)	3:58.42	
6	Thailand (THA)	4:00.65	
7	Hong Kong (HKG)	4:06.29	
8	India (IND)	4:08.20	
