= Swimming at the 1998 Asian Games – Men's 100 metre backstroke =

Men's 100 metre backstroke at the 1998 Asian Games
- Venue: Thammasat Aquatic Center
- Date: 11 December 1998
- Competitors: 22 from 16 nations

Medalists
gold medal	Alex Lim	Malaysia
silver medal	Fu Yong	China
bronze medal	Raymond Papa	Philippines

The men's 100 metre backstroke swimming competition at the 1998 Asian Games in Bangkok was held on 11 December at the Thammasat Aquatic Center.

== Schedule ==
All times are Indochina Time (UTC+07:00)

Date	Time	Event
Friday, 11 December 1998	09:00	Heats
Friday, 11 December 1998	18:00	Finals

== Results ==
Legend

- DNS — Did not start

=== Heats ===
Rank	Heat	Athlete	Time	Notes
1	3	Fu Yong (CHN)	57.41	
2	2	Alex Lim (MAS)	57.65	
2	3	Atsushi Nishikori (JPN)	57.65	
4	3	Shu Xin (CHN)	57.74	
5	2	Takafumi Oishi (JPN)	58.09	
6	1	Raymond Papa (PHI)	58.28	
7	1	Dulyarit Phuangthong (THA)	58.90	
8	2	Kim Min-suk (KOR)	59.44	
9	1	Pavel Sidorov (KAZ)	59.89	
10	2	Artem Rodin (KAZ)	1:00.11	
11	1	Konstantin Priahin (KGZ)	1:00.40	
12	2	Kwok Sze Wai (HKG)	1:00.77	
13	3	Pathunyu Yimsomruay (THA)	1:00.78	
14	1	Tseng Cheng-hua (TPE)	1:00.85	
15	3	Aleksandr Yegorov (KGZ)	1:01.04	
16	3	Wu Nien-pin (TPE)	1:01.34	
17	1	Fahad Al-Otaibi (KUW)	1:04.34	
18	3	Majid Imani (IRI)	1:06.52	
19	2	Lam Pui Kay (MAC)	1:06.74	
20	1	Abdur Rahman Khan (BAN)	1:08.51	
21	3	Mesned Al-Hajri (QAT)	1:16.08	
—	2	G. Mönkhbayar (MGL)	DNS	

=== Finals ===
==== Final B ====
Rank	Athlete	Time	Notes
1	Pavel Sidorov (KAZ)	59.42	
2	Pathunyu Yimsomruay (THA)	59.44	
3	Konstantin Priahin (KGZ)	59.50	
4	Artem Rodin (KAZ)	59.71	
5	Aleksandr Yegorov (KGZ)	1:00.63	
6	Kwok Sze Wai (HKG)	1:00.66	
7	Tseng Cheng-hua (TPE)	1:00.88	
8	Wu Nien-pin (TPE)	1:01.62	

==== Final A ====
Rank	Athlete	Time	Notes
1st place, gold medalist(s)	Alex Lim (MAS)	55.53	GR
2nd place, silver medalist(s)	Fu Yong (CHN)	56.40	
3rd place, bronze medalist(s)	Raymond Papa (PHI)	56.83	
4	Atsushi Nishikori (JPN)	57.14	
5	Shu Xin (CHN)	57.55	
6	Takafumi Oishi (JPN)	57.70	
7	Dulyarit Phuangthong (THA)	58.31	
8	Kim Min-suk (KOR)	1:09.25	
