= Swimming at the 1998 Asian Games – Men's 100 metre freestyle =

Men's 100 metre freestyle at the 1998 Asian Games
- Venue: Thammasat Aquatic Center
- Date: 9 December 1998
- Competitors: 35 from 21 nations

Medalists
gold medal	Shunsuke Ito	Japan
silver medal	Shusuke Ito	Japan
bronze medal	Zhao Lifeng	China
bronze medal	Huang Chih-yung	Chinese Taipei
bronze medal	Igor Sitnikov	Kazakhstan

The men's 100 metre freestyle swimming competition at the 1998 Asian Games in Bangkok was held on 9 December at the Thammasat Aquatic Center.

== Schedule ==
All times are Indochina Time (UTC+07:00)

Date	Time	Event
Wednesday, 9 December 1998	09:00	Heats
Wednesday, 9 December 1998	18:00	Finals

== Results ==
Legend

- DNS — Did not start

=== Heats ===
Rank	Heat	Athlete	Time	Notes
1	4	Igor Sitnikov (KAZ)	52.23	
2	1	Huang Chih-yung (TPE)	52.58	
3	3	Shusuke Ito (JPN)	52.67	
4	5	Shunsuke Ito (JPN)	52.85	
5	4	Ravil Nachaev (UZB)	52.87	
6	5	Zhao Lifeng (CHN)	53.00	
6	3	Andrey Kvassov (KAZ)	53.00	
8	4	Aleksandr Agafonov (UZB)	53.19	
9	5	Arthur Li (HKG)	53.23	
10	4	Sng Ju Wei (SIN)	53.27	
11	3	Fergus Kuek (SIN)	53.35	
11	1	Chen Yi-chung (TPE)	53.35	
13	5	Park Kyong-ho (KOR)	53.43	
14	3	Du Jie (CHN)	53.44	
15	3	Vicha Ratanachote (THA)	53.49	
16	3	Zachary Moffatt (HKG)	54.39	
17	3	Tang Chon Kit (MAC)	54.52	
18	5	Jatupat Sarikaputra (THA)	54.78	
19	4	Khowaiter Al-Dhaheri (UAE)	55.13	
20	4	Sebastian Xavier (IND)	55.40	
21	5	Koh Yun-ho (KOR)	55.59	
22	4	Farshid Karami (IRI)	56.25	
23	4	Hamid Reza Mobarrez (IRI)	56.26	
24	5	Nayef Al-Hasawi (KUW)	56.50	
25	2	Tang Kok Wai (MAC)	57.50	
26	3	Kazi Monirul Islam (BAN)	57.59	
27	5	Gihan Ranatunga (SRI)	57.87	
28	2	Abdulla Al-Mahmoud (QAT)	58.65	
29	2	Mussaad Razouki (KUW)	58.72	
30	2	Hem Kiry (CAM)	59.99	
31	2	Ammar Al-Ejji (QAT)	1:01.04	
32	2	Chitra Bahadur Gurung (NEP)	1:04.06	
—	1	Gürsediin Bayasgalan (MGL)	DNS	
—	2	Kamal Masud (PAK)	DNS	
—	2	Mumtaz Ahmed (PAK)	DNS	

=== Finals ===
==== Final B ====
Rank	Athlete	Time	Notes
1	Arthur Li (HKG)	52.64	
2	Fergus Kuek (SIN)	52.81	
3	Sng Ju Wei (SIN)	53.10	
4	Chen Yi-chung (TPE)	53.39	
5	Vicha Ratanachote (THA)	53.40	
6	Park Kyong-ho (KOR)	53.50	
7	Du Jie (CHN)	54.13	
8	Zachary Moffatt (HKG)	54.45	

==== Final A ====
Rank	Athlete	Time	Notes
1st place, gold medalist(s)	Shunsuke Ito (JPN)	51.29	
2nd place, silver medalist(s)	Shusuke Ito (JPN)	52.07	
3rd place, bronze medalist(s)	Zhao Lifeng (CHN)	52.21	
3rd place, bronze medalist(s)	Huang Chih-yung (TPE)	52.21	
3rd place, bronze medalist(s)	Igor Sitnikov (KAZ)	52.21	
6	Ravil Nachaev (UZB)	52.68	
7	Andrey Kvassov (KAZ)	52.82	
8	Aleksandr Agafonov (UZB)	52.91	
