= Swimming at the 1998 Asian Games – Men's 4 × 100 metre medley relay =

Men's 4 × 100 metre medley relay at the 1998 Asian Games
- Venue: Thammasat Aquatic Center
- Date: 12 December 1998
- Nations: 12

Medalists
| gold medal | Japan; Atsushi Nishikori, Akira Hayashi, Takashi Yamamoto, Shunsuke Ito |
| silver medal | China; Fu Yong, Zeng Qiliang, Zhang Xiao, Deng Qingsong |
| bronze medal | Kazakhstan; Pavel Sidorov, Alexandr Savitskiy, Andrey Gavrilov, Igor Sitnikov |

The men's 4 × 100 metre medley relay swimming competition at the 1998 Asian Games in Bangkok was held on 12 December at the Thammasat Aquatic Center.

== Schedule ==
All times are Indochina Time (UTC+07:00)

| Date | Time | Event |
|---|---|---|
| Saturday, 12 December 1998 | 09:00 | Heats |
| Saturday, 12 December 1998 | 18:00 | Final |

== Results ==
Legend

- DNS — Did not start

=== Heats ===
| Rank | Heat | Team | Time | Notes |
|---|---|---|---|---|
| 1 | 2 | Japan (JPN) | 3:54.14 | |
| 2 | 2 | China (CHN) | 3:56.13 | |
| 3 | 2 | Kazakhstan (KAZ) | 3:56.81 | |
| 4 | 1 | Singapore (SIN) | 3:58.06 | |
| 5 | 1 | Thailand (THA) | 3:59.23 | |
| 6 | 1 | Kyrgyzstan (KGZ) | 3:59.57 | |
| 7 | 1 | Hong Kong (HKG) | 4:02.62 | |
| 8 | 2 | Chinese Taipei (TPE) | 4:03.25 | |
| 9 | 2 | Kuwait (KUW) | 4:16.19 | |
| 10 | 2 | Macau (MAC) | 4:16.85 | |
| 11 | 1 | United Arab Emirates (UAE) | 4:21.32 | |
| — | 1 | South Korea (KOR) | DNS | |

=== Final ===
| Rank | Team | Time | Notes |
|---|---|---|---|
| 1st place, gold medalist(s) | Japan (JPN) | 3:41.98 | |
| 2nd place, silver medalist(s) | China (CHN) | 3:44.40 | |
| 3rd place, bronze medalist(s) | Kazakhstan (KAZ) | 3:51.13 | |
| 4 | Chinese Taipei (TPE) | 3:53.38 | |
| 5 | Singapore (SIN) | 3:54.09 | |
| 6 | Thailand (THA) | 3:56.03 | |
| 7 | Kyrgyzstan (KGZ) | 3:56.51 | |
| 8 | Hong Kong (HKG) | 3:57.68 | |
