= Swimming at the 1998 Asian Games – Men's 200 metre backstroke =

Men's 2100 metre backstroke at the 1998 Asian Games
- Venue: Thammasat Aquatic Center
- Date: 9 December 1998
- Competitors: 19 from 13 nations

Medalists
gold medal	Fu Yong	China
silver medal	Alex Lim	Malaysia
bronze medal	Raymond Papa	Philippines

The men's 200 metre backstroke swimming competition at the 1998 Asian Games in Bangkok was held on 9 December at the Thammasat Aquatic Center.

== Schedule ==
All times are Indochina Time (UTC+07:00)

Date	Time	Event
Wednesday, 9 December 1998	09:00	Heats
Wednesday, 9 December 1998	18:00	Final

== Results ==
Legend

- DNS — Did not start

=== Heats ===
Rank	Heat	Athlete	Time	Notes
1	1	Alex Lim (MAS)	2:04.36	
2	3	Fu Yong (CHN)	2:04.89	
2	1	Masakazu Hinata (JPN)	2:05.12	
4	3	Takafumi Oishi (JPN)	2:06.92	
5	1	Pathunyu Yimsomruay (THA)	2:07.65	
6	3	Alex Fong (HKG)	2:07.75	
7	2	Raymond Papa (PHI)	2:08.63	
8	2	Shu Xin (CHN)	2:09.15	
9	1	Tseng Cheng-hua (TPE)	2:09.65	
10	3	Wu Nien-pin (TPE)	2:10.44	
11	2	Pavel Sidorov (KAZ)	2:11.71	
12	1	Torwai Sethsothorn (THA)	2:11.84	
13	2	Artem Rodin (KAZ)	2:13.73	
14	3	Aleksandr Yegorov (KGZ)	2:14.45	
15	1	Fahad Al-Otaibi (KUW)	2:23.08	
16	2	Lam Pui Kay (MAC)	2:23.11	
17	3	Majid Imani (IRI)	2:30.11	
—	2	Konstantin Priahin (KGZ)	DNS	
—	3	Kim Min-suk (KOR)	DNS	

=== Final ===
Rank	Athlete	Time	Notes
1st place, gold medalist(s)	Fu Yong (CHN)	1:59.30	GR
2nd place, silver medalist(s)	Alex Lim (MAS)	2:00.94	
3rd place, bronze medalist(s)	Raymond Papa (PHI)	2:01.80	
4	Shu Xin (CHN)	2:04.19	
5	Masakazu Hinata (JPN)	2:04.44	
6	Takafumi Oishi (JPN)	2:04.92	
7	Pathunyu Yimsomruay (THA)	2:06.95	
8	Alex Fong (HKG)	2:08.41	
