= Swimming at the 1998 Asian Games – Women's 200 metre backstroke =

Women's 200 metre backstroke at the 1998 Asian Games
- Venue: Thammasat Aquatic Center
- Date: 12 December 1998
- Competitors: 14 from 9 nations

Medalists
gold medal	Tomoko Hagiwara	Japan
silver medal	Mai Nakamura	Japan
bronze medal	Shim Min-ji	South Korea

The women's 200 metre backstroke swimming competition at the 1998 Asian Games in Bangkok was held on 12 December at the Thammasat Aquatic Center.

== Schedule ==
All times are Indochina Time (UTC+07:00)

Date	Time	Event
Saturday, 12 December 1998	09:00	Heats
Saturday, 12 December 1998	18:00	Final

== Results ==
Legend

- DNS — Did not start

=== Heats ===
Rank	Heat	Athlete	Time	Notes
1	1	Tomoko Hagiwara (JPN)	2:14.07	
2	2	Choi Soo-min (KOR)	2:19.89	
3	1	Shim Min-ji (KOR)	2:20.35	
4	1	Mai Nakamura (JPN)	2:21.86	
5	2	Wu Yanyan (CHN)	2:22.79	
6	2	Sherry Tsai (HKG)	2:22.97	
7	2	Lizza Danila (PHI)	2:23.06	
8	1	Chonlathorn Vorathamrong (THA)	2:24.34	
9	1	Kuan Chia-hsien (TPE)	2:24.83	
10	2	Pojjana Puvanakitjakorn (THA)	2:27.29	
11	1	Saida Iskandarova (UZB)	2:34.61	
12	2	Chiang Tzu-ying (TPE)	2:35.78	
13	1	Lam Pui Chi (MAC)	2:40.87	
—	2	Chen Yan (CHN)	DNS	

=== Final ===
Rank	Athlete	Time	Notes
1st place, gold medalist(s)	Tomoko Hagiwara (JPN)	2:12.25	
2nd place, silver medalist(s)	Mai Nakamura (JPN)	2:14.79	
3rd place, bronze medalist(s)	Shim Min-ji (KOR)	2:16.46	
4	Choi Soo-min (KOR)	2:17.67	
5	Wu Yanyan (CHN)	2:19.45	
6	Sherry Tsai (HKG)	2:20.06	
7	Chonlathorn Vorathamrong (THA)	2:20.73	
8	Lizza Danila (PHI)	2:22.59	
