= Swimming at the 1998 Asian Games – Women's 4 × 200 metre freestyle relay =

Women's 4 × 200 metre freestyle relay at the 1998 Asian Games
- Venue: Thammasat Aquatic Center
- Date: 7 December 1998
- Competitors: 32 from 8 nations

Medalists
gold medal	China; Qin Caini, Qian Min, Yang Lina, Chen Hua
silver medal	Japan; Junko Nakatani, Sachiko Yamada, Yasuko Tajima, Eri Yamanoi
bronze medal	Chinese Taipei; Chiang Tzu-ying, Lin Chi-chan, Kuan Chia-hsien, Tsai Shu-min

The women's 4 × 200 metre freestyle relay swimming competition at the 1998 Asian Games in Bangkok was held on 7 December at the Thammasat Aquatic Center.

== Schedule ==
All times are Indochina Time (UTC+07:00)

Date	Time	Event
Monday, 7 December 1998	18:00	Final

== Results ==
Rank	Team	Time	Notes
1st place, gold medalist(s)	China (CHN)	8:08.00	GR
2nd place, silver medalist(s)	Japan (JPN)	8:12.06	
3rd place, bronze medalist(s)	Chinese Taipei (TPE)	8:18.92	
4	South Korea (KOR)	8:22.62	
5	Thailand (THA)	8:27.10	
6	Singapore (SIN)	8:43.85	
7	Hong Kong (HKG)	8:45.46	
8	India (IND)	9:02.71	
