= Swimming at the 1998 Asian Games – Men's 50 metre freestyle =

Men's 50 metre freestyle at the 1998 Asian Games
- Venue: Thammasat Aquatic Center
- Date: 11 December 1998
- Competitors: 37 from 22 nations

Medalists
gold medal	Jiang Chengji	China
silver medal	Tomohiro Yamanoi	Japan
bronze medal	Hirosuke Hamano	Japan

The men's 50 metre freestyle swimming competition at the 1998 Asian Games in Bangkok was held on 11 December at the Thammasat Aquatic Center.

== Schedule ==
All times are Indochina Time (UTC+07:00)

Date	Time	Event
Friday, 11 December 1998	09:00	Heats
Friday, 11 December 1998	18:00	Finals

== Results ==
Legend

- DNS — Did not start

=== Heats ===
Rank	Heat	Athlete	Time	Notes
1	5	Jiang Chengji (CHN)	22.68	GR
2	5	Tomohiro Yamanoi (JPN)	23.35	
3	5	Kim Min-suk (KOR)	23.55	
4	3	Sergey Borisenko (KAZ)	23.82	
5	4	Ravil Nachaev (UZB)	23.83	
6	4	Zhao Lifeng (CHN)	23.92	
7	1	Huang Chih-yung (TPE)	23.94	
8	3	Hirosuke Hamano (JPN)	24.03	
9	4	Harbeth Fu (HKG)	24.25	
9	4	Arwut Chinnapasaen (THA)	24.25	
9	4	Arthur Li (HKG)	24.25	
12	4	Sebastian Xavier (IND)	24.41	
13	1	Chen Yi-chung (TPE)	24.49	
14	4	Fergus Kuek (SIN)	24.55	
15	3	Park Kyong-ho (KOR)	24.69	
16	3	Kenneth Goh (SIN)	24.89	
17	3	Khowaiter Al-Dhaheri (UAE)	25.18	
18	5	Sandeep Kakkar (IND)	25.24	
19	2	Tang Chon Kit (MAC)	25.29	
20	5	Nayef Al-Hasawi (KUW)	25.60	
21	2	Ayoub Al-Mas (UAE)	25.70	
22	2	Farshid Karami (IRI)	25.74	
23	5	Ghefari Dulapandan (SRI)	25.87	
24	5	Kazi Monirul Islam (BAN)	25.96	
25	3	Hamid Reza Mobarrez (IRI)	25.97	
26	2	Tai Ka Kin (MAC)	26.14	
27	4	Gihan Ranatunga (SRI)	26.41	
28	2	Abdulla Al-Mahmoud (QAT)	26.67	
29	2	Mussaad Razouki (KUW)	26.72	
30	1	Trần Xuân Hiền (VIE)	27.01	
31	2	Hem Kiry (CAM)	27.86	
32	2	Chitra Bahadur Gurung (NEP)	28.29	
—	1	Gürsediin Bayasgalan (MGL)	DNS	
—	1	G. Mönkhbayar (MGL)	DNS	
—	3	Igor Sitnikov (KAZ)	DNS	
—	3	Jatupat Sarikaputra (THA)	DNS	
—	5	Raymond Papa (PHI)	DNS	

=== Finals ===
==== Final B ====
Rank	Athlete	Time	Notes
1	Harbeth Fu (HKG)	23.80	
2	Arthur Li (HKG)	23.82	
3	Arwut Chinnapasaen (THA)	24.03	
4	Kenneth Goh (SIN)	24.10	
5	Sebastian Xavier (IND)	24.12	
6	Fergus Kuek (SIN)	24.41	
7	Chen Yi-chung (TPE)	24.51	
8	Park Kyong-ho (KOR)	24.68	

==== Final A ====
Rank	Athlete	Time	Notes
1st place, gold medalist(s)	Jiang Chengji (CHN)	22.38	GR
2nd place, silver medalist(s)	Tomohiro Yamanoi (JPN)	23.26	
3rd place, bronze medalist(s)	Hirosuke Hamano (JPN)	23.43	
4	Ravil Nachaev (UZB)	23.49	
5	Kim Min-suk (KOR)	23.54	
6	Zhao Lifeng (CHN)	23.72	
7	Huang Chih-yung (TPE)	23.77	
7	Sergey Borisenko (KAZ)	23.77	
