= Swimming at the 1998 Asian Games – Women's 100 metre butterfly =

Women's 100 metre butterfly at the 1998 Asian Games
- Venue: Thammasat Aquatic Center
- Date: 10 December 1998
- Competitors: 19 from 14 nations

Medalists
gold medal	Ayari Aoyama	Japan
silver medal	Ruan Yi	China
bronze medal	Hitomi Kashima	Japan

The women's 100 metre butterfly swimming competition at the 1998 Asian Games in Bangkok was held on 10 December at the Thammasat Aquatic Center.

== Schedule ==
All times are Indochina Time (UTC+07:00)

Date	Time	Event
Thursday, 10 December 1998	09:00	Heats
Thursday, 10 December 1998	18:00	Final

== Results ==
=== Heats ===
Rank	Heat	Athlete	Time	Notes
1	2	Ayari Aoyama (JPN)	1:00.29	
2	2	Ruan Yi (CHN)	1:01.27	
3	3	Cho Hee-yeon (KOR)	1:01.75	
4	1	Hitomi Kashima (JPN)	1:01.76	
5	3	Qu Yun (CHN)	1:02.10	
6	2	Joscelin Yeo (SIN)	1:02.42	
7	3	Hsieh Shu-tzu (TPE)	1:03.09	
8	1	Hsieh Shu-ting (TPE)	1:03.44	
9	1	Pamela Tung (HKG)	1:03.98	
10	3	Praphalsai Minpraphal (THA)	1:04.00	
11	1	Christel Bouvron (SIN)	1:04.08	
12	3	Duangruthai Thammaphanya (THA)	1:06.57	
13	2	Meghana Narayan (IND)	1:07.91	
14	1	Lizza Danila (PHI)	1:08.64	
15	2	Saida Iskandarova (UZB)	1:10.31	
16	3	Lou On Kei (MAC)	1:10.60	
17	1	Rola El-Haress (LIB)	1:10.87	
18	3	Hana Majaj (JOR)	1:13.16	
19	2	Natasha Kodituwakku (SRI)	1:21.41	

=== Final ===
Rank	Athlete	Time	Notes
1st place, gold medalist(s)	Ayari Aoyama (JPN)	59.44	
2nd place, silver medalist(s)	Ruan Yi (CHN)	1:00.57	
3rd place, bronze medalist(s)	Hitomi Kashima (JPN)	1:00.87	
4	Cho Hee-yeon (KOR)	1:01.03	
5	Qu Yun (CHN)	1:01.49	
6	Joscelin Yeo (SIN)	1:02.33	
7	Hsieh Shu-tzu (TPE)	1:02.50	
8	Hsieh Shu-ting (TPE)	1:02.91	
