= Swimming at the 1998 Asian Games – Men's 200 metre individual medley =

Men's 200 metre individual medley at the 1998 Asian Games
- Venue: Thammasat Aquatic Center
- Date: 12 December 1998
- Competitors: 22 from 16 nations

Medalists
gold medal	Xiong Guoming	China
silver medal	Jo Yoshimi	Japan
bronze medal	Xie Xufeng	China

The men's 200 metre individual medley swimming competition at the 1998 Asian Games in Bangkok was held on 12 December at the Thammasat Aquatic Center.

== Schedule ==
All times are Indochina Time (UTC+07:00)

Date	Time	Event
Saturday, 12 December 1998	09:00	Heats
Saturday, 12 December 1998	18:00	Finals

== Results ==
Legend

- DNS — Did not start

=== Heats ===
Rank	Heat	Athlete	Time	Notes
1	3	Jo Yoshimi (JPN)	2:05.30	
2	2	Xiong Guoming (CHN)	2:06.07	
3	1	Xie Xufeng (CHN)	2:06.53	
4	3	Ratapong Sirisanont (THA)	2:06.95	
5	2	Kim Bang-hyun (KOR)	2:07.10	
6	3	Tatsuya Kinugasa (JPN)	2:07.19	
7	1	Han Kyu-chul (KOR)	2:07.75	
8	1	Pathunyu Yimsomruay (THA)	2:08.28	
9	1	Oleg Pukhnatiy (UZB)	2:08.44	
10	3	Desmond Koh (SIN)	2:08.76	
11	3	Tseng Cheng-hua (TPE)	2:10.88	
12	2	Wu Nien-pin (TPE)	2:11.30	
13	2	Mark Kwok (HKG)	2:12.06	
14	3	Alex Fong (HKG)	2:14.89	
15	2	Sultan Al-Otaibi (KUW)	2:21.63	
16	3	Pirouz Eftekhar-Manavi (IRI)	2:22.53	
17	2	Lou Keng Ip (MAC)	2:25.33	
18	1	Hem Kiry (CAM)	2:27.97	
19	1	Gihan Ranatunga (SRI)	2:30.28	
20	3	Mesned Al-Hajri (QAT)	2:38.60	
—	1	Obeid Al-Rumaithi (UAE)	DNS	
—	2	Alexandr Savitskiy (KAZ)	DNS	

=== Finals ===
==== Final B ====
Rank	Athlete	Time	Notes
1	Alex Fong (HKG)	2:08.43	
2	Tseng Cheng-hua (TPE)	2:09.43	
3	Wu Nien-pin (TPE)	2:11.00	
4	Oleg Pukhnatiy (UZB)	2:12.99	
5	Pirouz Eftekhar-Manavi (IRI)	2:23.37	
—	Desmond Koh (SIN)	DNS	
—	Mark Kwok (HKG)	DNS	
—	Sultan Al-Otaibi (KUW)	DNS	

==== Final A ====
Rank	Athlete	Time	Notes
1st place, gold medalist(s)	Xiong Guoming (CHN)	2:03.34	GR
2nd place, silver medalist(s)	Jo Yoshimi (JPN)	2:04.93	
3rd place, bronze medalist(s)	Xie Xufeng (CHN)	2:05.45	
4	Kim Bang-hyun (KOR)	2:05.55	
5	Ratapong Sirisanont (THA)	2:05.64	
6	Tatsuya Kinugasa (JPN)	2:06.20	
7	Han Kyu-chul (KOR)	2:06.83	
8	Pathunyu Yimsomruay (THA)	2:07.03	
