= Swimming at the 1998 Asian Games – Women's 200 metre butterfly =

Women's 200 metre butterfly at the 1998 Asian Games
- Venue: Thammasat Aquatic Center
- Date: 12 December 1998
- Competitors: 14 from 9 nations

Medalists
gold medal	Cho Hee-yeon	South Korea
silver medal	Ruan Yi	China
bronze medal	Hitomi Kashima	Japan

The women's 200 metre butterfly swimming competition at the 1998 Asian Games in Bangkok was held on 12 December at the Thammasat Aquatic Center.

== Schedule ==
All times are Indochina Time (UTC+07:00)

Date	Time	Event
Saturday, 12 December 1998	09:00	Heats
Saturday, 12 December 1998	18:00	Final

== Results ==
Legend

- DNS — Did not start

=== Heats ===
Rank	Heat	Athlete	Time	Notes
1	1	Cho Hee-yeon (KOR)	2:14.10	
2	1	Hitomi Kashima (JPN)	2:14.88	
3	2	Ai Ota (JPN)	2:15.44	
4	2	Ruan Yi (CHN)	2:16.33	
5	2	Qu Yun (CHN)	2:16.58	
6	1	Hsieh Shu-ting (TPE)	2:16.91	
7	1	Lee Ji-hyun (KOR)	2:18.89	
8	1	Praphalsai Minpraphal (THA)	2:22.94	
9	2	Duangruthai Thammaphanya (THA)	2:23.75	
10	2	Pamela Tung (HKG)	2:24.01	
11	1	Christel Bouvron (SIN)	2:25.93	
12	1	Hana Majaj (JOR)	2:40.85	
—	2	Hsieh Shu-tzu (TPE)	DNS	
—	2	Meghana Narayan (IND)	DNS	

=== Final ===
Rank	Athlete	Time	Notes
1st place, gold medalist(s)	Cho Hee-yeon (KOR)	2:11.34	
2nd place, silver medalist(s)	Ruan Yi (CHN)	2:12.51	
3rd place, bronze medalist(s)	Hitomi Kashima (JPN)	2:13.26	
4	Ai Ota (JPN)	2:13.86	
5	Qu Yun (CHN)	2:14.02	
6	Hsieh Shu-ting (TPE)	2:14.69	
7	Lee Ji-hyun (KOR)	2:16.91	
8	Praphalsai Minpraphal (THA)	2:17.70	
