= Swimming at the 1998 Asian Games – Men's 200 metre butterfly =

Men's 200 metre butterfly at the 1998 Asian Games
- Venue: Thammasat Aquatic Center
- Date: 11 December 1998
- Competitors: 19 from 14 nations

Medalists
gold medal	Takashi Yamamoto	Japan
silver medal	Xie Xufeng	China
bronze medal	Han Kyu-chul	South Korea

The men's 200 metre butterfly swimming competition at the 1998 Asian Games in Bangkok was held on 11 December at the Thammasat Aquatic Center.

== Schedule ==
All times are Indochina Time (UTC+07:00)

Date	Time	Event
Friday, 11 December 1998	09:00	Heats
Friday, 11 December 1998	18:00	Final

== Results ==
=== Heats ===
Rank	Heat	Athlete	Time	Notes
1	3	Takashi Yamamoto (JPN)	2:01.47	
2	2	Han Kyu-chul (KOR)	2:02.42	
3	2	Xie Xufeng (CHN)	2:02.49	
4	3	Hung Chien-chih (TPE)	2:03.73	
5	3	Konstantin Andriushin (KGZ)	2:03.84	
6	1	Tseng Cheng-hua (TPE)	2:04.17	
7	1	Hisayoshi Tanaka (JPN)	2:04.52	
8	1	Mark Kwok (HKG)	2:04.62	
9	2	Carlo Piccio (PHI)	2:07.51	
10	1	Fadi Kouzmah (SYR)	2:08.82	
11	3	Jonathan Chua (SIN)	2:09.80	
12	1	Nuttapong Ladawon (THA)	2:09.93	
13	3	Nuttapol Chavanavanichwoot (THA)	2:10.21	
14	3	Charles Szeto (HKG)	2:15.28	
15	2	Sultan Al-Otaibi (KUW)	2:16.64	
16	2	Lou Keng Ip (MAC)	2:18.60	
17	1	Ghefari Dulapandan (SRI)	2:20.13	
18	3	Pirouz Eftekhar-Manavi (IRI)	2:20.36	
19	2	Gihan Ranatunga (SRI)	2:31.13	

=== Final ===
Rank	Athlete	Time	Notes
1st place, gold medalist(s)	Takashi Yamamoto (JPN)	1:56.75	GR
2nd place, silver medalist(s)	Xie Xufeng (CHN)	1:59.67	
3rd place, bronze medalist(s)	Han Kyu-chul (KOR)	2:00.46	
4	Hisayoshi Tanaka (JPN)	2:01.24	
5	Hung Chien-chih (TPE)	2:03.25	
6	Tseng Cheng-hua (TPE)	2:03.37	
7	Konstantin Andriushin (KGZ)	2:03.43	
8	Mark Kwok (HKG)	2:03.45	
