= Swimming at the 1998 Asian Games – Women's 800 metre freestyle =

Women's 800 metre freestyle at the 1998 Asian Games
- Venue: Thammasat Aquatic Center
- Date: 11 December 1998
- Competitors: 10 from 8 nations

Medalists
gold medal	Chen Hua	China
silver medal	Sachiko Yamada	Japan
bronze medal	Eri Yamanoi	Japan

The women's 800 metre freestyle swimming competition at the 1998 Asian Games in Bangkok was held on 11 December at the Thammasat Aquatic Center.

== Schedule ==
All times are Indochina Time (UTC+07:00)

Date	Time	Event
Friday, 11 December 1998	09:00	Final 1
Friday, 11 December 1998	18:00	Final 2

== Results ==
Legend

- DNS — Did not start

Rank	Heat	Athlete	Time	Notes
1st place, gold medalist(s)	2	Chen Hua (CHN)	8:38.00	
2nd place, silver medalist(s)	2	Sachiko Yamada (JPN)	8:39.21	
3rd place, bronze medalist(s)	2	Eri Yamanoi (JPN)	8:56.90	
4	1	Lin Chi-chan (TPE)	9:01.74	
5	2	Ravee Intaporn-udom (THA)	9:03.81	
6	2	Rutai Santadvatana (THA)	9:13.50	
7	2	Cheryl Chong (SIN)	9:19.74	
8	1	Marella Mamoun (SYR)	9:46.99	
9	1	Rola El-Haress (LIB)	10:10.22	
—	2	Shim Min-ji (KOR)	DNS	
