= Swimming at the 1998 Asian Games – Women's 100 metre breaststroke =

Women's 100 metre breaststroke at the 1998 Asian Games
- Venue: Thammasat Aquatic Center
- Date: 10 December 1998
- Competitors: 18 from 14 nations

Medalists
gold medal	Li Wei	China
silver medal	Xu Shan	China
bronze medal	Masami Tanaka	Japan

The women's 100 metre breaststroke swimming competition at the 1998 Asian Games in Bangkok was held on 10 December at the Thammasat Aquatic Center.

== Schedule ==
All times are Indochina Time (UTC+07:00)

Date	Time	Event
Thursday, 10 December 1998	09:00	Heats
Thursday, 10 December 1998	18:00	Final

== Results ==
=== Heats ===
Rank	Heat	Athlete	Time	Notes
1	1	Xu Shan (CHN)	1:11.43	
2	3	Li Wei (CHN)	1:11.49	
3	2	Masami Tanaka (JPN)	1:12.97	
4	3	Kye Yoon-hee (KOR)	1:13.21	
5	3	Kathy Echiverri (PHI)	1:14.14	
6	2	Junko Isoda (JPN)	1:15.12	
7	1	Rita Mariani (INA)	1:15.15	
8	2	May Ooi (SIN)	1:15.36	
9	1	Anastasiya Korolyova (UZB)	1:15.67	
10	3	Tachaporn Iamsanitamorn (THA)	1:15.73	
11	1	Lin Fang-tzu (TPE)	1:16.53	
12	3	Papaporn Kunacheewa (THA)	1:16.68	
13	2	Daphne Teo (SIN)	1:17.28	
14	2	Cheong Weng Lam (MAC)	1:18.21	
15	1	Caroline Chiu (HKG)	1:19.46	
16	3	Hem Raksmey (CAM)	1:32.75	
17	1	Natasha Kodituwakku (SRI)	1:33.71	
18	2	Nayana Shakya (NEP)	1:34.87	

=== Final ===
Rank	Athlete	Time	Notes
1st place, gold medalist(s)	Li Wei (CHN)	1:08.95	GR
2nd place, silver medalist(s)	Xu Shan (CHN)	1:10.00	
3rd place, bronze medalist(s)	Masami Tanaka (JPN)	1:10.30	
4	Kye Yoon-hee (KOR)	1:12.03	
5	Junko Isoda (JPN)	1:12.88	
6	Kathy Echiverri (PHI)	1:14.17	
7	May Ooi (SIN)	1:15.21	
8	Rita Mariani (INA)	1:15.72	
