= Swimming at the 1998 Asian Games – Women's 100 metre backstroke =

Women's 100 metre backstroke at the 1998 Asian Games
- Venue: Thammasat Aquatic Center
- Date: 9 December 1998
- Competitors: 16 from 11 nations

Medalists
gold medal	Tomoko Hagiwara	Japan
silver medal	Mai Nakamura	Japan
bronze medal	Choi Soo-min	South Korea

The women's 100 metre backstroke swimming competition at the 1998 Asian Games in Bangkok was held on 9 December at the Thammasat Aquatic Center.

== Schedule ==
All times are Indochina Time (UTC+07:00)

Date	Time	Event
Wednesday, 9 December 1998	09:00	Heats
Wednesday, 9 December 1998	18:00	Final

== Results ==
Legend

- DNS — Did not start

=== Heats ===
Rank	Heat	Athlete	Time	Notes
1	2	Mai Nakamura (JPN)	1:02.67	
2	1	Tomoko Hagiwara (JPN)	1:03.03	
3	2	Choi Soo-min (KOR)	1:03.76	
4	1	Shim Min-ji (KOR)	1:04.25	
5	2	Sherry Tsai (HKG)	1:04.75	
6	1	Chonlathorn Vorathamrong (THA)	1:06.11	
7	2	Kathy Echiverri (PHI)	1:06.65	
8	2	Lizza Danila (PHI)	1:07.46	
9	2	Kuan Chia-hsien (TPE)	1:07.92	
10	1	Pojjana Puvanakitjakorn (THA)	1:08.71	
11	1	Chiang Tzu-ying (TPE)	1:12.83	
12	2	Lam Pui Chi (MAC)	1:14.49	
13	1	Nguyễn Thị Hương (VIE)	1:15.38	
14	1	Radeesha Daluwatte (SRI)	1:18.77	
15	2	Nayana Shakya (NEP)	1:27.77	
—	1	Abhinaya Shetty (IND)	DNS	

=== Final ===
Rank	Athlete	Time	Notes
1st place, gold medalist(s)	Tomoko Hagiwara (JPN)	1:01.84	
2nd place, silver medalist(s)	Mai Nakamura (JPN)	1:02.11	
3rd place, bronze medalist(s)	Choi Soo-min (KOR)	1:03.37	
4	Shim Min-ji (KOR)	1:03.46	
5	Sherry Tsai (HKG)	1:04.72	
6	Kathy Echiverri (PHI)	1:05.55	
7	Chonlathorn Vorathamrong (THA)	1:05.92	
8	Lizza Danila (PHI)	1:06.54	
