= Swimming at the 1998 Asian Games – Women's 200 metre freestyle =

Women's 200 metre freestyle at the 1998 Asian Games
- Venue: Thammasat Aquatic Center
- Date: 8 December 1998
- Competitors: 18 from 11 nations

Medalists
gold medal	Tsai Shu-min	Chinese Taipei
silver medal	Qin Caini	China
bronze medal	Sachiko Yamada	Japan

The women's 200 metre freestyle swimming competition at the 1998 Asian Games in Bangkok was held on 8 December at the Thammasat Aquatic Center.

== Schedule ==
All times are Indochina Time (UTC+07:00)

Date	Time	Event
Tuesday, 8 December 1998	09:00	Heats
Tuesday, 8 December 1998	18:00	Final

== Results ==
Legend

- DNS — Did not start

=== Heats ===
Rank	Heat	Athlete	Time	Notes
1	3	Sachiko Yamada (JPN)	2:04.04	
2	1	Qin Caini (CHN)	2:05.42	
3	3	Pilin Tachakittiranan (THA)	2:06.07	
4	3	Eri Yamanoi (JPN)	2:06.15	
5	3	Tsai Shu-min (TPE)	2:06.66	
6	1	Ravee Intaporn-udom (THA)	2:06.83	
7	2	Chiang Tzu-ying (TPE)	2:07.80	
8	3	Cheryl Chong (SIN)	2:09.04	
9	2	Lee Eun-hae (KOR)	2:09.21	
10	2	Christel Bouvron (SIN)	2:09.47	
11	1	Nisha Millet (IND)	2:10.28	
12	2	Robyn Lamsam (HKG)	2:11.73	
13	3	Pang Shuk Mui (HKG)	2:15.60	
14	1	Saida Iskandarova (UZB)	2:15.92	
15	1	Võ Trần Trường An (VIE)	2:16.79	
16	2	Rola El-Haress (LIB)	2:17.12	
17	1	Shikha Tandon (IND)	2:17.72	
—	2	Chen Yan (CHN)	DNS	

=== Final ===
Rank	Athlete	Time	Notes
1st place, gold medalist(s)	Tsai Shu-min (TPE)	2:00.89	
2nd place, silver medalist(s)	Qin Caini (CHN)	2:01.75	
3rd place, bronze medalist(s)	Sachiko Yamada (JPN)	2:03.14	
4	Eri Yamanoi (JPN)	2:03.65	
5	Pilin Tachakittiranan (THA)	2:05.17	
6	Ravee Intaporn-udom (THA)	2:05.71	
7	Chiang Tzu-ying (TPE)	2:06.75	
8	Cheryl Chong (SIN)	2:10.50	
