= Swimming at the 1998 Asian Games – Men's 400 metre individual medley =

Men's 400 metre individual medley at the 1998 Asian Games
- Venue: Thammasat Aquatic Center
- Date: 8 December 1998
- Competitors: 13 from 9 nations

Medalists
gold medal	Takahiro Mori	Japan
silver medal	Xiong Guoming	China
bronze medal	Ratapong Sirisanont	Thailand

The men's 400 metre individual medley swimming competition at the 1998 Asian Games in Bangkok was held on 8 December at the Thammasat Aquatic Center.

== Schedule ==
All times are Indochina Time (UTC+07:00)

Date	Time	Event
Tuesday, 8 December 1998	09:00	Heats
Tuesday, 8 December 1998	18:00	Final

== Results ==
=== Heats ===
Rank	Heat	Athlete	Time	Notes
1	2	Takahiro Mori (JPN)	4:23.34	
2	2	Tatsuya Kinugasa (JPN)	4:26.56	
3	2	Xie Xufeng (CHN)	4:26.84	
4	1	Kim Bang-hyun (KOR)	4:28.14	
5	1	Ratapong Sirisanont (THA)	4:28.30	
6	1	Xiong Guoming (CHN)	4:28.31	
7	1	Mark Kwok (HKG)	4:29.87	
8	2	Tseng Cheng-hua (TPE)	4:31.48	Withdrew
9	2	Torwai Sethsothorn (THA)	4:31.62	Advanced
10	1	Alex Fong (HKG)	4:34.12	
11	2	Carlo Piccio (PHI)	4:34.95	
12	2	Yevgeny Petrashov (KGZ)	4:54.36	
13	1	Hem Kiry (CAM)	5:19.90	

=== Final ===
Rank	Athlete	Time	Notes
1st place, gold medalist(s)	Takahiro Mori (JPN)	4:20.98	
2nd place, silver medalist(s)	Xiong Guoming (CHN)	4:22.57	
3rd place, bronze medalist(s)	Ratapong Sirisanont (THA)	4:24.15	
4	Xie Xufeng (CHN)	4:25.06	
5	Tatsuya Kinugasa (JPN)	4:25.42	
6	Kim Bang-hyun (KOR)	4:25.95	
7	Tseng Cheng-hua (TPE)	4:29.89	
8	Torwai Sethsothorn (THA)	4:30.18	
