= Swimming at the 2002 Asian Games – Men's 50 metre freestyle =

Men's 50 metre freestyle at the 2002 Asian Games
- Venue: Sajik Swimming Pool
- Date: 5 October 2002
- Competitors: 34 from 22 nations

Medalists
| gold medal | Kim Min-suk | South Korea |
| gold medal | Ravil Nachaev | Uzbekistan |
| bronze medal | Issei Nakanishi | Japan |

The men's 50 metre freestyle swimming competition at the 2002 Asian Games in Busan was held on 5 October at the Sajik Swimming Pool.

== Schedule ==
All times are Korea Standard Time (UTC+09:00)

| Date | Time | Event |
|---|---|---|
| Saturday, 5 October 2002 | 10:00 | Heats |
| Saturday, 5 October 2002 | 19:00 | Finals |

== Records ==
Prior to this competition, the existing world, Asian and Games records were as follows.

| World Record | Aleksandr Popov (RUS) | 21.64 | Moscow, Russia | 16 June 2000 |
| Asian Record | Tomohiro Yamanoi (JPN) | 22.18 | Fukuoka, Japan | 23 July 2001 |
| Games Record | Jiang Chengji (CHN) | 22.38 | Bangkok, Thailand | 11 December 1998 |

== Results ==
Legend

- DNS — Did not start

=== Heats ===
| Rank | Heat | Athlete | Time | Notes |
|---|---|---|---|---|
| 1 | 5 | Kim Min-suk (KOR) | 23.08 | |
| 2 | 4 | Ravil Nachaev (UZB) | 23.10 | |
| 3 | 4 | Issei Nakanishi (JPN) | 23.17 | |
| 4 | 3 | Naoki Nagura (JPN) | 23.31 | |
| 5 | 5 | Lee Chung-hee (KOR) | 23.37 | |
| 6 | 5 | Richard Sam Bera (INA) | 23.49 | |
| 7 | 4 | Allen Ong (MAS) | 23.62 | |
| 8 | 3 | Igor Sitnikov (KAZ) | 23.68 | |
| 9 | 5 | Jin Hao (CHN) | 23.73 | |
| 9 | 1 | Maksim Korshunov (TJK) | 23.73 | |
| 11 | 3 | Arwut Chinnapasaen (THA) | 23.75 | |
| 12 | 5 | Andrey Kvassov (KAZ) | 23.81 | |
| 13 | 3 | Tang Wenjun (CHN) | 23.84 | |
| 13 | 4 | Harbeth Fu (HKG) | 23.84 | |
| 15 | 4 | Wang Shao-an (TPE) | 23.91 | |
| 16 | 5 | Wu Nien-pin (TPE) | 23.92 | |
| 17 | 3 | Mohammed Yamani (KSA) | 24.15 | |
| 18 | 4 | Gary Tan (SIN) | 24.16 | |
| 19 | 5 | Mark Chay (SIN) | 24.28 | |
| 20 | 5 | Kenneth Doo (HKG) | 24.56 | |
| 21 | 4 | Zaid Al-Marafi (JOR) | 24.84 | |
| 22 | 3 | Lubrey Lim (MAS) | 24.89 | |
| 23 | 2 | Tang Chon Kit (MAC) | 25.13 | |
| 24 | 4 | Lou Keng Ip (MAC) | 25.40 | |
| 25 | 3 | Trần Xuân Hiền (VIE) | 25.95 | |
| 26 | 2 | Ganaagiin Galbadrakh (MGL) | 26.73 | |
| 27 | 2 | Andryein Tamir (MGL) | 26.99 | |
| 28 | 2 | Chitra Bahadur Gurung (NEP) | 27.31 | |
| 29 | 1 | Hem Kiry (CAM) | 27.71 | |
| 30 | 1 | Imran Abdul Rahman (MDV) | 29.02 | |
| 31 | 1 | Alice Shrestha (NEP) | 29.20 | |
| — | 2 | Abdulla Al-Mahmoud (QAT) | DNS | |
| — | 2 | Abdulla Al-Ollan (QAT) | DNS | |
| — | 2 | Omar Daaboul (LIB) | DNS | |

=== Finals ===
==== Final B ====
| Rank | Athlete | Time | Notes |
|---|---|---|---|
| 1 | Arwut Chinnapasaen (THA) | 23.61 | |
| 2 | Tang Wenjun (CHN) | 23.65 | |
| 3 | Harbeth Fu (HKG) | 23.66 | |
| 4 | Jin Hao (CHN) | 23.67 | |
| 5 | Wu Nien-pin (TPE) | 23.75 | |
| 6 | Wang Shao-an (TPE) | 23.82 | |
| 7 | Maksim Korshunov (TJK) | 23.99 | |
| 8 | Andrey Kvassov (KAZ) | 24.13 | |

==== Final A ====
| Rank | Athlete | Time | Notes |
|---|---|---|---|
| 1st place, gold medalist(s) | Kim Min-suk (KOR) | 22.86 | |
| 1st place, gold medalist(s) | Ravil Nachaev (UZB) | 22.86 | |
| 3rd place, bronze medalist(s) | Issei Nakanishi (JPN) | 23.14 | |
| 4 | Richard Sam Bera (INA) | 23.49 | |
| 5 | Naoki Nagura (JPN) | 23.31 | |
| 6 | Lee Chung-hee (KOR) | 23.37 | |
| 7 | Allen Ong (MAS) | 23.62 | |
| 8 | Igor Sitnikov (KAZ) | 23.68 | |
