= Swimming at the 1998 Asian Games – Men's 1500 metre freestyle =

Men's 1500 metre freestyle at the 1998 Asian Games
- Venue: Thammasat Aquatic Center
- Date: 12 December 1998
- Competitors: 11 from 8 nations

Medalists
gold medal	Masato Hirano	Japan
silver medal	Torlarp Sethsothorn	Thailand
bronze medal	Hisham Al-Masri	Syria

The men's 1500 metre freestyle swimming competition at the 1998 Asian Games in Bangkok was held on 12 December at the Thammasat Aquatic Center.

== Schedule ==
All times are Indochina Time (UTC+07:00)

Date	Time	Event
Saturday, 12 December 1998	09:00	Final 1
Saturday, 12 December 1998	18:00	Final 2

== Results ==
Rank	Heat	Athlete	Time	Notes
1st place, gold medalist(s)	2	Masato Hirano (JPN)	15:22.20	GR
2nd place, silver medalist(s)	2	Torlarp Sethsothorn (THA)	15:40.17	
3rd place, bronze medalist(s)	2	Hisham Al-Masri (SYR)	15:51.60	
4	2	Yosuke Ichikawa (JPN)	16:02.61	
5	1	Li Yun-lun (TPE)	16:03.13	
6	2	Torwai Sethsothorn (THA)	16:07.00	
7	2	Woo Chul (KOR)	16:12.85	
8	1	Carlo Piccio (PHI)	16:23.73	
9	2	Lee Gyu-chang (KOR)	16:28.71	
10	2	Wang Chuan (CHN)	16:39.75	
11	1	Hamed Rezakhani (IRI)	17:06.98	
