= Masami Tanaka =

Japanese swimmer (born 1979)

Personal information
- Full name: Masami Tanaka
- Nationality: Japan
- Born: January 5, 1979 (age 47) Engaru, Hokkaido, Japan
- Height: 1.64 m (5 ft 5 in)
- Weight: 58 kg (128 lb)

Sport
- Sport: Swimming
- Strokes: Breaststroke
- Club: Curl-Burke Swim Club (Now known as the Nation's Capital Swim Club)
- Coach: Pete Morgan
Medal record
Women's swimming
Representing Japan
Olympic Games
Bronze medal – third place	2000 Sydney	4×100 m medley
World Championships (LC)
Bronze medal – third place	1998 Perth	4×100 m medley
World Championships (SC)
Gold medal – first place	1999 Hong Kong	50 m breaststroke
Gold medal – first place	1999 Hong Kong	100 m breaststroke
Gold medal – first place	1999 Hong Kong	200 m breaststroke
Gold medal – first place	1999 Hong Kong	4×100 m medley
Pan Pacific Championships
Silver medal – second place	1997 Fukuoka	200 m breaststroke
Bronze medal – third place	1995 Atlanta	4×100 m medley
Bronze medal – third place	1999 Sydney	4×100 m medley
Asian Games
Gold medal – first place	1998 Bangkok	4×100 m medley
Gold medal – first place	1998 Bangkok	200 m breaststroke
Silver medal – second place	1994 Hiroshima	100 m breaststroke
Silver medal – second place	1994 Hiroshima	4×100 m medley
Bronze medal – third place	1994 Hiroshima	200 m breaststroke
Bronze medal – third place	1998 Bangkok	100 m breaststroke
Universiade
Gold medal – first place	1997 Catania	200 m breaststroke

Masami Tanaka (田中 雅美, Tanaka Masami; born January 5, 1979 in Engaru, Hokkaidō) is a former breaststroke swimmer from Japan. She won the bronze medal in the 4 × 100 m Medley Relay at the 2000 Summer Olympics in Sydney, Australia. Her winning teammates in that race were Mai Nakamura, Junko Onishi, and Sumika Minamoto. She competed in three consecutive Summer Olympics, starting in 1996.

== Acting career ==
=== Animation voice acting ===
- Finding Dory, Striped marlin

=== Dramas ===
- Black Pean (2018), as Naho Shimano, patient Koharu's mother (eps. 4, 5)
