= Swimming at the 2002 Asian Games – Men's 100 metre freestyle =

Men's 100 metre freestyle at the 2002 Asian Games
- Venue: Sajik Swimming Pool
- Date: 3 October 2002
- Competitors: 35 from 22 nations

Medalists
gold medal	Chen Zuo	China
silver medal	Liu Yu	China
bronze medal	Daisuke Hosokawa	Japan

The men's 100 metre freestyle swimming competition at the 2002 Asian Games in Busan was held on 3 October at the Sajik Swimming Pool.

== Schedule ==
All times are Korea Standard Time (UTC+09:00)

Date	Time	Event
Thursday, 3 October 2002	10:00	Heats
Thursday, 3 October 2002	19:00	Finals

== Records ==
Prior to this competition, the existing world, Asian and Games records were as follows.

World Record	Pieter van den Hoogenband (NED)	47.84	Sydney, Australia	19 September 2000
Asian Record	Hiroaki Akebe (JPN)	50.32	Tokyo, Japan	15 June 2002
Games Record	Huang Shaohua (CHN)	50.36	Busan, South Korea	2 October 2002

== Results ==
Legend

- DNS — Did not start

=== Heats ===
Rank	Heat	Athlete	Time	Notes
1	3	Daisuke Hosokawa (JPN)	51.04	
2	5	Koh Yun-ho (KOR)	51.63	
3	5	Allen Ong (MAS)	51.74	
4	4	Chen Zuo (CHN)	51.75	
5	4	Wu Nien-pin (TPE)	51.77	
6	5	Hiroaki Akebe (JPN)	51.85	
7	3	Liu Yu (CHN)	51.90	
8	5	Richard Sam Bera (INA)	52.22	
9	1	Maksim Korshunov (TJK)	52.26	
10	3	Wang Shao-an (TPE)	52.27	
11	5	Gary Tan (SIN)	52.33	
12	4	Igor Sitnikov (KAZ)	52.59	
13	4	Kim Min-suk (KOR)	52.60	
14	4	Mark Chay (SIN)	52.64	
15	3	Andrey Kvassov (KAZ)	52.93	
16	4	Miguel Molina (PHI)	53.34	
17	3	Harbeth Fu (HKG)	53.44	
18	5	Kenneth Doo (HKG)	53.52	
19	5	Aleksandr Agafonov (UZB)	53.77	
20	4	Wong Tuck Kar (MAS)	54.86	
21	3	Tang Chon Kit (MAC)	55.23	
22	5	Zaid Al-Marafi (JOR)	56.14	
23	2	Omar Daaboul (LIB)	56.77	
24	2	Muhammad Khan (PAK)	56.91	
25	3	Abdulla Al-Mahmoud (QAT)	57.39	
26	4	Lou Keng Ip (MAC)	57.41	
27	2	Andryein Tamir (MGL)	58.43	
28	2	Ganboldyn Urnultsaikhan (MGL)	59.89	
29	2	Hem Kiry (CAM)	1:00.13	
30	2	Arwut Chinnapasaen (THA)	1:00.38	
31	2	Chitra Bahadur Gurung (NEP)	1:00.57	
32	1	Alice Shrestha (NEP)	1:05.03	
33	1	Imran Abdul Rahman (MDV)	1:05.34	
—	3	Ravil Nachaev (UZB)	DNS	
—	2	Abdulla Al-Ollan (QAT)	DNS	

=== Finals ===
==== Final B ====
Rank	Athlete	Time	Notes
1	Gary Tan (SIN)	52.21	
2	Andrey Kvassov (KAZ)	52.27	
3	Igor Sitnikov (KAZ)	52.42	
4	Wang Shao-an (TPE)	52.53	
5	Mark Chay (SIN)	52.64	
6	Maksim Korshunov (TJK)	52.65	
7	Miguel Molina (PHI)	53.55	
—	Kim Min-suk (KOR)	DNS	

==== Final A ====
Rank	Athlete	Time	Notes
1st place, gold medalist(s)	Chen Zuo (CHN)	50.76	
2nd place, silver medalist(s)	Liu Yu (CHN)	50.83	
3rd place, bronze medalist(s)	Daisuke Hosokawa (JPN)	51.22	
4	Koh Yun-ho (KOR)	51.38	
5	Richard Sam Bera (INA)	51.41	
6	Hiroaki Akebe (JPN)	51.65	
7	Wu Nien-pin (TPE)	51.70	
8	Allen Ong (MAS)	52.27	
