= Hisham Al-Masri =

Syrian swimmer

Personal information
- Born: 27 February 1973 (age 53)

Sport
- Sport: Swimming
Medal record
Men's swimming
Representing Syria
Mediterranean Games
Gold medal – first place	1993 Languedoc-Roussillon	1500 m freestyle
Asian Games
Gold medal – first place	1994 Hiroshima	1500 m freestyle
Bronze medal – third place	1998 Bangkok	1500 m freestyle

Hisham Al-Masri (Arabic: هشام المصري; born 27 February 1973) is a Syrian former swimmer who competed in the 1992 Summer Olympics and in the 1996 Summer Olympics.
