= Andrey Gavrilov =

Kazakhstani swimmer (born 1974)

Personal information
- Born: May 4, 1974 (age 52) Temirtau, Soviet Union

Sport
- Sport: Swimming
Medal record
Representing Kazakhstan
Asian Games
Bronze medal – third place	1994 Hiroshima	4x100m medley relay
Bronze medal – third place	1998 Bangkok	4x100m medley relay

Andrey Gavrilov (Russian: Андрей Гаврилов; born May 4, 1974) is a retired male butterfly swimmer from Kazakhstan. He competed in two consecutive Summer Olympics for his native country, starting in 1996 (Atlanta, Georgia). His best Olympic result was finishing in 15th place at the 1996 Summer Olympics in the Men's 4 × 100 m Medley Relay event.
