= Han Xue (swimmer) =

Chinese swimmer (born 1981)

Personal information
- Born: September 21, 1981 (age 45) Beijing, China

Sport
- Sport: Swimming
Medal record
Representing China
Olympic Games
Bronze medal – third place	1996 Atlanta	4x100m medley relay
World Championships (SC)
Gold medal – first place	1995 Rio de Janeiro	4x100m freestyle relay
Gold medal – first place	1997 Gothenburg	4x100m medley relay
Bronze medal – third place	1999 Hong Kong	50m breaststroke
Summer Universiade
Gold medal – first place	2001 Beijing	50m freestyle
Silver medal – second place	2001 Beijing	100m freestyle
Asian Games
Gold medal – first place	1998 Bangkok	4x100m freestyle relay
Silver medal – second place	1998 Bangkok	50m freestyle

Han Xue (韓 雪, born 21 September 1981 in Beijing) is a Chinese swimmer and Olympic medalist. She participated at the 1996 Summer Olympics in Atlanta, winning a bronze medal in 4 x 100 metre medley relay. She also competed at the 2000 Summer Olympics in Sydney.
