= Igor Sitnikov =

Kazakh swimmer

Personal information
- Full name: Igor Sitnikov
- Nationality: Kazakhstan
- Born: 13 July 1979 (age 46) Temirtau, Karaganda Region, Kazakh SSR, Soviet Union
- Height: 1.83 m (6 ft 0 in)
- Weight: 76 kg (168 lb)

Sport
- Sport: Swimming
- Strokes: Freestyle
Medal record
Men's swimming
Representing Kazakhstan
Asian Games
Bronze medal – third place	1998 Bangkok	100 m freestyle
Bronze medal – third place	1998 Bangkok	4×100 m freestyle
Bronze medal – third place	1998 Bangkok	4×100 m medley

Igor Sitnikov (Kazakh: Игорь Ситников; born July 13, 1977) is a Kazakh former swimmer, who specialized in sprint freestyle events. He won a bronze medal at the 1998 Asian Games, and later represented Kazakhstan at the 2000 Summer Olympics.

Sitnikov made his official debut at the 1998 Asian Games in Bangkok, Thailand, where he shared bronze medals with China's Zhao Lifeng and Chinese Taipei's Huang Chih-yung in the 100 m freestyle (52.21).

At the 2000 Summer Olympics in Sydney, Sitnikov competed only in two swimming events. He eclipsed a FINA B-cut of 51.69 (100 m freestyle) from the Kazakhstan Open Championships in Almaty. On the first day of the Games, Sitnikov placed twenty-first for the Kazakhstan team in the 4 × 100 m freestyle relay. Teaming with Sergey Borisenko, Pavel Sidorov, and Andrey Kvassov in heat three, Sitnikov swam a lead-off leg and recorded a split of 52.56, but the Kazakhs settled only for last place in a final time of 3:28.90. Three days later, in the 100 m freestyle, Sitnikov placed fifty-third on the morning prelims. Swimming in heat five, he raced to a fifth seed by 0.15 seconds ahead of Chinese Taipei's Wu Nien-pin in 52.57.

Two years later, at the 2002 Asian Games in Busan, South Korea, Sitnikov failed to medal in any of his individual events, finishing eighth in the 50 m freestyle (23.68), and eleventh, through a consolation final round, in the 100 m freestyle (52.42).
