= Ayari Aoyama =

Japanese swimmer (born 1982)

Personal information
- Full name: Ayari Aoyama
- Nationality: Japan
- Born: February 10, 1982 (age 44) Ishikawa, Japan
- Height: 1.52 m (5 ft 0 in)
- Weight: 42 kg (93 lb)

Sport
- Sport: Swimming
- Strokes: Butterfly
- Club: Itoman Swimming School
Medal record
Women's swimming
Representing Japan
World Championships (LC)
Silver medal – second place	1998 Perth	100 m butterfly
Bronze medal – third place	1998 Perth	4×100 m medley
World Championships (SC)
Gold medal – first place	1999 Hong Kong	4×100 m medley
Bronze medal – third place	1999 Hong Kong	100 m butterfly
Pan Pacific Championships
Silver medal – second place	1997 Fukuoka	100 m butterfly
Bronze medal – third place	1995 Atlanta	4×100 m medley
Bronze medal – third place	1997 Fukuoka	4×100 m medley
Bronze medal – third place	1999 Sydney	100 m butterfly
Bronze medal – third place	1999 Sydney	4×100 m medley
Asian Games
Gold medal – first place	1998 Bangkok	100 m butterfly
Gold medal – first place	1998 Bangkok	4×100 m medley

Ayari Aoyama (青山 綾里, Aoyama Ayari; born February 10, 1982) is a retired Japanese female butterfly swimmer. She represented her native country at the 1996 Summer Olympics in Atlanta, Georgia. She is a former world record holder in the women's 100m (short course) butterfly event.
