= Li Wei (swimmer) =

Chinese swimmer (born 1979)

Personal information
- Born: March 9, 1979 (age 47)

Sport
- Sport: Swimming
Medal record
Representing China
Asian Games
Gold medal – first place	1998 Bangkok	100m breaststroke
Silver medal – second place	1998 Bangkok	4x100m medley relay

Li Wei (born 9 March 1979) is a Chinese former swimmer who competed in the 2000 Summer Olympics.
