= Chen Hua =

Chinese swimmer (born 1982)

CHEN Hua
Personal information
- Nationality: China
- Born: October 20, 1982 (age 43) Hangzhou, Zhejiang, China

Sport
- Sport: Swimming
- Strokes: Freestyle
Medal record
Asian Games
Gold medal – first place	Bangkok 1998	400 free
Gold medal – first place	Bangkok 1998	800 free
World University Games
Gold medal – first place	Daegu 2003	4x200 Free Relay
Silver medal – second place	Daegu 2003	400 free
Silver medal – second place	Daegu 2003	800 free
Bronze medal – third place	Daegu 2003	4x100 Free Relay
Short Course Worlds
Gold medal – first place	Hong Kong 1999	800 free
Gold medal – first place	Athens 2000	800 free
Gold medal – first place	Moscow 2002	800 free
Bronze medal – third place	Athens 2000	400 free

Chen Hua (born October 20, 1982) is a two-time Olympic swimmer, and former World Record holder, from China. She swam for China at the 2000 and 2004 Olympics. She was born in Hangzhou, Zhejiang, China.

In December 2001, she set a short course World Record in the 800 freestyle, which stood for two months.

She swam for China at the:

- Olympics: 2000 and 2004
- World Championships: 1998
- Asian Games: 1998
- World University Games: 2003
- Short Course Worlds: 1999, 2000 and 2002

Records
Preceded by Astrid Strauss	World Record Holder; Women's 800 Freestyle (25m); December 3, 2001 – February 4, 2002	Succeeded by Sachiko Yamada
