= Swimming at the 1998 World Aquatics Championships =

- Host city: Perth, Western Australia, Australia
- Date: 7–18 January 1998
- Venue: Challenge Stadium

These are the results of the swimming competition at the 1998 World Aquatics Championships.

== Doping ==
During a routine customs check on Chinese swimmer Yuan Yuan's luggage, enough human growth hormone was discovered to supply the entire women's swimming team for the duration of the championships. Only Yuan was sanctioned for the incident, with speculation that this was connected to the nomination of Juan Antonio Samaranch by China for the Nobel Peace Prize in 1993. Tests in Perth also found the presence of the banned diuretic masking agent triamterine in the urine of four swimmers, Wang Luna, Yi Zhang, Huijue Cai and Wei Wang. The swimmers were suspended from competition for two years, with three coaches associated with the swimmers, Zhi Cheng, Hiuqin Xu and Zhi Cheng each suspended for three months.

== Medal table ==
* Host nation (Australia)

| Rank | Nation | Gold | Silver | Bronze | Total |
|---|---|---|---|---|---|
| 1 | United States (USA) | 14 | 5 | 5 | 24 |
| 2 | Australia (AUS)* | 7 | 6 | 7 | 20 |
| 3 | China (CHN) | 3 | 2 | 2 | 7 |
| 4 | Germany (GER) | 1 | 4 | 3 | 8 |
| 5 | France (FRA) | 1 | 3 | 0 | 4 |
| 6 | Netherlands (NED) | 1 | 2 | 2 | 5 |
| 7 | Russia (RUS) | 1 | 1 | 1 | 3 |
| 8 | Ukraine (UKR) | 1 | 1 | 0 | 2 |
| 9 | Hungary (HUN) | 1 | 0 | 2 | 3 |
| 10 | Belgium (BEL) | 1 | 0 | 0 | 1 |
| 10 | Costa Rica (CRC) | 1 | 0 | 0 | 1 |
| 12 | Japan (JPN) | 0 | 2 | 3 | 5 |
| 13 | Slovakia (SVK) | 0 | 2 | 1 | 3 |
| 14 | Italy (ITA) | 0 | 2 | 0 | 2 |
| 15 | Canada (CAN) | 0 | 1 | 3 | 4 |
| 16 | Sweden (SWE) | 0 | 1 | 1 | 2 |
| 17 | Great Britain (GBR) | 0 | 0 | 2 | 2 |
| 18 | Puerto Rico (PUR) | 0 | 0 | 1 | 1 |
| Totals (18 entries) | | 32 | 32 | 33 | 97 |

== Medal summary ==
=== Men ===
| Event | Gold | | Silver | | Bronze | |
|---|---|---|---|---|---|---|
| 50 metre freestyle | Bill Pilczuk (USA) | 22.29 | Aleksandr Popov (RUS) | 22.43 | Ricardo Busquets; Puerto Rico Michael Klim; Australia | 22.47 22.47; OC |
| 100 metre freestyle | Aleksandr Popov (RUS) | 48.93; CR | Michael Klim (AUS) | 49.20 | Lars Frölander (SWE) | 49.53 |
| 200 metre freestyle | Michael Klim (AUS) | 1:47.41 | Massimiliano Rosolino (ITA) | 1:48.30 | Pieter van den Hoogenband (NED) | 1:48.65 |
| 400 metre freestyle | Ian Thorpe (AUS) | 3:46.29 | Grant Hackett (AUS) | 3:46.44 | Paul Palmer (GBR) | 3:48.02 |
| 1500 metre freestyle | Grant Hackett (AUS) | 14:51.70 | Emiliano Brembilla (ITA) | 15:00.59 | Daniel Kowalski (AUS) | 15:03.94 |
| 100 metre backstroke | Lenny Krayzelburg (USA) | 55.00; CR | Mark Versfeld (CAN) | 55.17 | Stev Theloke (GER) | 55.20 |
| 200 metre backstroke | Lenny Krayzelburg (USA) | 1:58.84 | Ralf Braun (ITA) | 1:59.23 | Mark Versfeld (CAN) | 1:59.39 |
| 100 metre breaststroke | Frédérik Deburghgraeve (BEL) | 1:01.34 | Zeng Qiliang (CHN) | 1:01.76 | Kurt Grote (USA) | 1:01.93 |
| 200 metre breaststroke | Kurt Grote (USA) | 2:13.40 | Jean-Christophe Sarnin (FRA) | 2:13.42 | Norbert Rózsa (HUN) | 2:13.59 |
| 100 metre butterfly | Michael Klim (AUS) | 52.25; CR | Lars Frölander (SWE) | 52.79 | Geoff Huegill (AUS) | 52.90 |
| 200 metre butterfly | Denys Sylantyev (UKR) | 1:56.61 | Franck Esposito (FRA) | 1:56.77 | Tom Malchow (USA) | 1:57.26 |
| 200 metre individual medley | Marcel Wouda (NED) | 2:01.18 | Xavier Marchand (FRA) | 2:01.66 | Ron Karnaugh (USA) | 2:01.89 |
| 400 metre individual medley | Tom Dolan (USA) | 4:14.95 | Marcel Wouda (NED) | 4:15.43 | Curtis Myden (CAN) | 4:16.45 |
| 4 × 100 metre freestyle relay | United States; Scott Tucker (49.80); Neil Walker (48.75); Jon Olsen (49.48); Gary Hall, Jr. (48.66); Bryan Jones^{[a]} Bryan Schumacher^{[a]} | 3:16.69; CR | Australia; Michael Klim (49.27); Adam Pine (49.47); Richard Upton (49.64); Chris Fydler (48.59); Nathan Rickard^{[a]} Anthony Rogis^{[a]} | 3:16.97; OC | Russia; Aleksandr Popov (48.74) CR; Roman Yegorov (49.67); Vladislav Kulikov (51.28); Denis Pimankov (48.76); Maxim Korshunov^{[a]} | 3:18.45 |
| 4 × 200 metre freestyle relay | Australia; Michael Klim (1:47.67); Grant Hackett (1:48.41); Ian Thorpe (1:47.67); Daniel Kowalski (1:48.73); Anthony Rogis^{[a]} | 7:12.48; CR, OC | Netherlands; Pieter van den Hoogenband (1:48.36); Mark van der Zijden (1:50.60); Martijn Zuijdweg (1:49.75); Marcel Wouda (1:48.06); Bas-Ido Wennekes^{[a]} Johan Kenkhuis^{[a]} | 7:16.77; NR | United Kingdom; Paul Palmer (1:49.72); Gavin Meadows (1:48.61); Andrew Clayton (1:50.38); James Salter (1:48.62); Mark Stevens^{[a]} | 7:17.33; NR |
| 4 × 100 metre medley relay | Australia; Matt Welsh (55.56); Phil Rogers (1:01.38); Michael Klim (51.80); Chris Fydler (49.24); Geoff Huegill^{[a]} | 3:37.98; OC | United States; Lenny Krayzelburg (55.30); Kurt Grote (1:00.96); Neil Walker (53.41); Gary Hall, Jr. (48.89); Jeremy Linn^{[a]} John Hargis^{[a]} Scott Tucker^{[a]} | 3:38.56 | Hungary; Attila Czene (55.56); Norbert Rózsa (1:00.64); Péter Horváth (53.14); Attila Zubor (49.20) | 3:39.53 |
AF African record | AM Americas record | AS Asian record | CR Championship record | ER European record | OC Oceania record | WR World record | NR National record

=== Women ===
| Event | Gold | | Silver | | Bronze | |
|---|---|---|---|---|---|---|
| 50 metre freestyle | Amy Van Dyken (USA) | 25.15 | Sandra Völker (GER) | 25.32 | Shan Ying (CHN) | 25.36 |
| 100 metre freestyle | Jenny Thompson (USA) | 54.95 | Martina Moravcová (SVK) | 55.09 | Shan Ying (CHN) | 55.10 |
| 200 metre freestyle | Claudia Poll (CRC) | 1:58.90 | Martina Moravcová (SVK) | 1:59.61 | Julia Greville (AUS) | 1:59.92 |
| 400 metre freestyle | Chen Yan (CHN) | 4:06.72 | Brooke Bennett (USA) | 4:07.07 | Dagmar Hase (GER) | 4:08.82 |
| 800 metre freestyle | Brooke Bennett (USA) | 8:28.71 | Diana Munz (USA) | 8:29.97 | Kirsten Vlieghuis (NED) | 8:32.34 |
| 100 metre backstroke | Lea Maurer (USA) | 1:01.16 | Mai Nakamura (JPN) | 1:01.28 | Sandra Völker (GER) | 1:01.47 |
| 200 metre backstroke | Roxana Maracineanu (FRA) | 2:11.26 | Dagmar Hase (GER) | 2:11.45 | Mai Nakamura (JPN)} | 2:12.22 |
| 100 metre breaststroke | Kristy Kowal (USA) | 1:08.42 | Helen Denman (AUS) | 1:08.51 | Lauren van Oosten (CAN)} | 1:08.66 |
| 200 metre breaststroke | Ágnes Kovács (HUN) | 2:25.45; CR | Kristy Kowal (USA) | 2:26.49 | Jenna Street (USA)} | 2:26.50 |
| 100 metre butterfly | Jenny Thompson (USA) | 58.46; CR | Ayari Aoyama (JPN) | 58.79; NR | Petria Thomas (AUS)} | 58.97; OC |
| 200 metre butterfly | Susie O'Neill (AUS) | 2:07.93 | Petria Thomas (AUS)} | 2:09.08 | Misty Hyman (USA) | 2:09.98 |
| 200 metre individual medley | Wu Yanyan (CHN) | 2:10.88; CR | Chen Yan (CHN) | 2:13.66 | Martina Moravcová (SVK) | 2:14.26 |
| 400 metre individual medley | Chen Yan (CHN) | 4:36.66 | Yana Klochkova (UKR) | 4:38.60; NR | Yasuko Tajima (JPN) | 4:39.45 |
| 4 × 100 metre freestyle relay | United States; Lindsey Farella (56.61); Amy Van Dyken (54.94); Barbara Bedford (56.22); Jenny Thompson (54.14); Catherine Fox^{[a]} Melanie Valerio^{[a]} | 3:42.11 | Germany; Sandra Völker (55.68); Franziska van Almsick (55.95); Simone Osygus (56.58); Katrin Meissner (54.90); Antje Buschschulte^{[a]} Silvia Szalai^{[a]} | 3:43.11 | Australia; Sarah Ryan (56.24); Rebecca Creedy (55.80); Susie O'Neill (55.40); Angela Kennedy (56.27); Kate Godfrey^{[a]} | 3:43.71 |
| 4 × 200 metre freestyle relay | Germany; Franziska van Almsick (2:01.28); Dagmar Hase (2:00.16); Silvia Szalai (2:00.42); Kerstin Kielgass (1:59.60); Antje Buschschulte^{[a]} Janina Götz^{[a]} | 8:01.46 | United States; Cristina Teuscher (2:00.92); Lindsay Benko (2:00.94); Brooke Bennett (2:01.17); Jenny Thompson (1:59.85); Trina Jackson^{[a]} Ashley Whitney^{[a]} | 8:02.88 | Australia; Julia Greville (2:00.92); Anna Windsor (2:03.23); Susie O'Neill (1:58.80); Petria Thomas (2:01.24); Emma Johnson^{[a]} | 8:04.19 |
| 4 × 100 metre medley relay | United States; Lea Maurer (1:01.91); Kristy Kowal (1:07.20); Jenny Thompson (57.89); Amy Van Dyken (54.93); Beth Botsford^{[a]} Jenna Street^{[a]} Misty Hyman^{[a]} Barbara Bedford^{[a]} | 4:01.93; AM | Australia; Meredith Smith (1:02.73); Helen Denman (1:08.32); Petria Thomas (58.68); Susie O'Neill (55.39); Samantha Riley^{[a]} Angela Kennedy^{[a]} Sarah Ryan^{[a]} | 4:05.12 | Japan; Mai Nakamura (1:01.83); Masami Tanaka (1:10.24); Ayari Aoyama (59.09); Sumika Minamoto (55.11) | 4:06.27; NR |
AF African record | AM Americas record | AS Asian record | CR Championship record | ER European record | OC Oceania record | WR World record | NR National record

^{a} Swimmers who participated in the heats only and received medals.
