= Wu Yanyan =

Chinese swimmer (born 1978)

Personal information
- Full name: Wu Yanyan
- Nationality: China
- Born: November 7, 1978 (age 48)

Sport
- Sport: Swimming
- Strokes: Individual medley
Medal record
Women's swimming
Representing China
World Championships (LC)
Gold medal – first place	1998 Perth	200 m medley

Wu Yanyan (simplified Chinese: 吴艳艳; traditional Chinese: 吳艷艷; pinyin: Wú Yànyàn; born November 7, 1978) is a Chinese swimmer who is the former world record holder in the women's 200 metres individual medley. Wu set the world record in a time of 2:09.72 in Shanghai at China's National Games in October 1997.

Wu first caught attention when she won China's 1996 Olympic Trials in a world-leading 2:12.87, defeating 1992 Olympic champion Lin Li into second place. She also placed 2nd in the 400 IM in a strong 4:41.20. Much like most of her teammates, however, she eventually failed at the Atlanta Games, failing to qualify for the finals of both medley events. Had she repeated her trials times in Atlanta, she could have won gold in the 200 IM and silver in the 400. In fact, her 200 IM time was over 1 second faster than Michelle Smith's winning time in Atlanta (2:13.93), and ranked first globally for 1996.

One year after the Olympics, Wu set a world record of 2:09.72 at the 1997 Chinese National Games, where she also placed 2nd in the 400 IM (4:36.28; the race was won by Chen Yan in a world record of 4:34.79) and third in the 200 back (2:10.71) and 200 fly (2:10.45). She went on to win the 200 IM at the 1998 World Championships in Perth, Australia in the 2nd fastest time ever (2:10.88), and also placed 4th in the 200 fly (2:10.22, the only Chinese swimmer to set a personal best in Perth) and 400 IM (4:40.16). After the win, her times dropped off significantly, though she managed to win the 200 IM gold at the 1998 Asian Games in Bangkok, Thailand (2:15.12). She also competed in the 1999 Short Course Worlds in Hong Kong but did not medal.

Wu's performance improved suddenly at the national championships (also serving at China's Olympic Trials) in Jinan City in May 2000, where she won the 200 IM in 2:14.02 (third in the world at that time), thereby leading to growing suspicions that she was involved in doping. Soon it was confirmed that she failed to dope test following the Trials in Jinan, and she was banned for four years by the Chinese authorities. An anabolic steroid was found in her system.

The 22-year-old denied taking drugs but was immediately dropped by China's Olympic Team preparing for 2000 Summer Olympics that September, and was fined $964 by the Chinese Swimming Association. Her coach Wu Jicai was given a $482 fine and banned for one year.

Consequently, Wu Yanyan's world record, which stood for over 10.5 years, is considered a tainted one. The American Katie Hoff, who specialises in the individual medley, stated that erasing the record is "my one and only goal". Eventually, it was Australian Stephanie Rice who lowered Wu's record to 2:08.92 on March 25, 2008 at the 2008 Australian Swimming Championships. Hoff bettered the World mark later that same year, at the USA Olympic Trials.

== See also ==
- World record progression 200 metres medley
- List of sportspeople sanctioned for doping offences

Records
Preceded by (China) Lin Li	Women's 200 metre individual medley world record holder (long course); October 17, 1997 – March 25, 2008	Succeeded by (Australia) Stephanie Rice
