= Hitomi Kashima =

Japanese swimmer (born 1980)

Personal information
- Full name: 鹿島 瞳
- Nationality: Japan
- Born: February 26, 1980 (age 46)
- Height: 1.62 m (5 ft 4 in)
- Weight: 52 kg (115 lb)

Sport
- Sport: Swimming
- Strokes: Butterfly
Medal record
World Championships (SC)
Silver medal – second place	1997 Gothenburg	200 m butterfly
Asian Games
Bronze medal – third place	1998 Bangkok	100 m butterfly
Bronze medal – third place	1998 Bangkok	200 m butterfly

Hitomi Kashima (鹿島 瞳, Kashima Hitomi; born February 26, 1980) is a retired Japanese female butterfly swimmer. She represented Japan at the 1996 Summer Olympics in Atlanta, Georgia. She also won a silver medal at the 1997 FINA Short Course World Championships.
