= Aleksandr Yegorov (swimmer) =

Kyrgyzstani swimmer (born 1976)

Personal information
- Full name: Aleksandr Yegorov
- National team: Kyrgyzstan
- Born: 16 June 1976 (age 50) Frunze, Kirghiz SSR, Soviet Union
- Height: 1.85 m (6 ft 1 in)
- Weight: 75 kg (165 lb)

Sport
- Sport: Swimming
- Strokes: Backstroke

Aleksandr Yegorov (Russian: Александр Егоров; born June 16, 1976) is a Kyrgyz former swimmer, who specialized in backstroke events. Yegorov competed only in the men's 200 m backstroke at the 2000 Summer Olympics in Sydney. He posted a FINA B-standard entry time of 2:07.11 from the Russian National Championships in Moscow. He challenged five other swimmers in heat one, including Hong Kong's Alex Fong, who later became one of city's most popular singers. He rounded out the field to last place with a slowest time of 2:13.85. Yegorov failed to advance into the semifinals, as he placed forty-fourth overall in the prelims.
