= Kuan Chia-hsien =

Taiwanese swimmer

Personal information
- Full name: Kuan Chia-hsien
- National team: Chinese Taipei
- Born: 7 June 1985 (age 41) Taipei, Taiwan
- Height: 1.66 m (5 ft 5 in)
- Weight: 43 kg (95 lb)

Sport
- Sport: Swimming
- Strokes: Backstroke
Medal record
Representing Chinese Taipei
Asian Games
Bronze medal – third place	1998 Bangkok	4x100m medley relay

Kuan Chia-hsien (Chinese: 官 佳嫻; pinyin: Guān Jiāxián; born June 7, 1985) is a Taiwanese former swimmer, who specialized in backstroke events. Kuan competed in a backstroke double, as a 15-year-old, at the 2000 Summer Olympics in Sydney. She achieved FINA B-standards of 1:05.54 (100 m backstroke) and 2:21.12 (200 m backstroke) from the National University Games in Taipei. On the second day of the Games, Kuan placed fortieth in the 100 m backstroke. Swimming in heat two, she trailed behind the rest of the field over the race, and picked up a seventh seed in 1:07.18, more than 1.2 seconds below her entry standard. Four days later, in the 200 m backstroke, Kuan edged out Croatia's Petra Banović on the final stretch to post a third-seeded time of 2:24.61 from heat one, but finished only in thirty-third overall on the morning prelims.
