= Tsai Shu-min =

Taiwanese swimmer

Personal information
- Full name: Tsai Shu-min
- National team: Chinese Taipei
- Born: 4 February 1981 (age 45) Changhua County, Taiwan
- Height: 1.67 m (5 ft 6 in)
- Weight: 48 kg (106 lb)

Sport
- Sport: Swimming
- Strokes: Freestyle, backstroke, medley
Medal record
Women's swimming
Representing Chinese Taipei
Asian Games
Gold medal – first place	1998 Bangkok	200 m freestyle
Bronze medal – third place	1998 Bangkok	400 m freestyle
Bronze medal – third place	1998 Bangkok	4×100 m freestyle
Bronze medal – third place	1998 Bangkok	4×200 m freestyle

Tsai Shu-min (Chinese: 蔡 淑敏; pinyin: Cài Shūmǐn; born February 4, 1981, in Changhua County) is a retired Taiwanese swimmer, who specialized in sprint and middle-distance freestyle, but also competed in backstroke and in individual medley. She represented Chinese Taipei in two editions of the Olympic Games (1996 and 2000), and later earned four medals in swimming, including her first ever gold, at the 1998 Asian Games in Bangkok, Thailand.

Tsai made her first Chinese Taipei team, as a 15-year-old teen, at the 1996 Summer Olympics in Atlanta. There, she failed to reach the top 16 final in any of her individual events, finishing fortieth in the 100 m freestyle (58.65), thirty-fourth in the 100 m backstroke (1:11.44), and forty-first in the 200 m individual medley (2:28.71). A member of the Chinese Taipei team, she placed eighteenth in the 4×100 m freestyle relay (3:56.39), nineteenth in the 4×200 m freestyle relay (8:27.61), and twenty-fourth in the 4×100 m medley relay (4:38.90).

Two years later, at the 1998 FINA World Championships in Perth, Australia, Tsai narrowly missed the podium by a hundredth of a second (0.01) in the 200 m freestyle at 1:59.93. On that same year, she captured the 200 m freestyle title at the Asian Games in Bangkok, Thailand with a sterling time of 2:00.89, adding it to three bronze medals from her hardware each in the 400 m freestyle (4:15.66), 4×100 m freestyle relay (3:51.42), and 4×200 m freestyle relay (8:18.92).

At the 2000 Summer Olympics in Sydney, Tsai competed only in a freestyle double. She achieved FINA B-standards of 57.83 (100 m freestyle) and 2:03.33 (200 m freestyle) from the National University Games in Taipei. On the third day of the Games, Tsai placed thirty-second in the 200 m freestyle. Swimming in heat three, she faded down the stretch to pick up a seventh seed in 2:06.12, more than three seconds below her entry standard. Two days later, in the 100 m freestyle, Tsai posted a time of 59.39 to overhaul a minute barrier in the same heat, but fell short to forty-sixth overall on the morning prelims.
