= Wang Shao-an =

Taiwanese swimmer (born 1984)

Personal information
- Full name: Wang Shao-an
- National team: Chinese Taipei
- Born: 31 October 1984 (age 41) Taipei, Taiwan
- Height: 1.90 m (6 ft 3 in)
- Weight: 80 kg (176 lb)

Sport
- Sport: Swimming
- Strokes: Freestyle

Wang Shao-an (Chinese: 王紹安; pinyin: Wáng Shào'ān; born 31 October 1984) is a Taiwanese former swimmer, who specialized in sprint freestyle events. He is a single-time Olympian, and a sixth-place finalist in the 100 m freestyle at the 2010 Asian Games in Guangzhou, China. He also competed in two previous Asian Games (2002 and 2006), but finished outside the top 8.

Wang qualified for the men's 50 m freestyle at the 2004 Summer Olympics in Athens, by clearing a FINA B-standard entry time of 23.29 from the National University Games in Taipei. He challenged seven other swimmers in heat six, including three-time Olympian Julio Santos of Ecuador. He edged out Estonia's Danil Haustov to earn a seventh spot by two hundredths of a second (0.02) in 23.54. Wang failed to advance into the semifinals, as he placed forty-eighth overall out of 86 swimmers in the prelims.
