= Xie Xufeng =

Chinese swimmer (born 1978)

Personal information
- Born: January 16, 1978 (age 48)

Sport
- Sport: Swimming
Medal record
Representing China
Asian Games
Silver medal – second place	1998 Bangkok	200m butterfly
Bronze medal – third place	1998 Bangkok	200m individual medley

Xie Xufeng (born 16 January 1978) is a Chinese former swimmer who competed in the 2000 Summer Olympics.
