= Meghana Narayan =

Indian swimmer

Meghana Narayan (born 11 May 1984 in Pune, Maharashtra, India) is an international swimming champion. She was also one of India's Rhodes Scholars in 2000, and currently works as a management consultant in London.

== Swimming career ==
- Asiad swimmer and former national champion.
- Women's swimming relay team, 2x400m freestyle, 13th Asian Games, Bangkok, 1998
- ... Meghana Narayan ... [etc.] have all done us proud by winning medals in the international level.
- Member of KCR Women's Relay Team, National Champions, 1998.
- In 1998, was National 100m, 200m Fly Record Holder.

=== Records ===
- 1995 - 400m butterfly, 4:39.00
- 1997 - 200m butterfly, 2:24.24, 11 November 1997
- 1998 - 50m butterfly

== Education ==
- Computer Science and Engineering at UVCE, Bangalore University, 1999.
- Masters in computer science as a Rhodes scholar at Oriel College, Oxford, 2002.
- MBA, Harvard Business School, 2007.

Whilst at Oxford, she earned a "blue" in swimming.

== Post Oxford ==
After a spell as a Business Analyst in Delhi with McKinsey & Co, she went on to get an MBA from the Harvard Business School (2005–2007), and from 2007 through 2015 worked as a management consultant with McKinsey & Company in London and Delhi. In 2015–2016, she co-founded Slurrp Farm, an organic food company for children based in Delhi.

== Personal ==
Meghana met her fiancé, Arunabha Ghosh, in Oxford; they married in Bangalore.
