= Fu Yong =

Chinese swimmer (born 1978)

Personal information
- Born: January 4, 1978 (age 48)

Sport
- Sport: Swimming
Medal record
Representing China
Asian Games
Gold medal – first place	1998 Bangkok	200m backstroke
Silver medal – second place	1998 Bangkok	4x100m medley relay

Fu Yong (born 4 January 1978) is a Chinese former swimmer who competed in the 2000 Summer Olympics.
