= Ruan Yi =

Chinese swimmer (born 1981)

Personal information
- Born: July 17, 1981 (age 44) Zhejiang, China

Sport
- Sport: Swimming
Medal record
Representing China
Asian Games
Silver medal – second place	1998 Bangkok	100m butterfly
Silver medal – second place	1998 Bangkok	200m butterfly
Silver medal – second place	1998 Bangkok	4x100m medley relay

Ruan Yi (born 17 July 1981) is a Chinese former swimmer who competed in the 2000 Summer Olympics.
