= Huang Chih-yung =

Taiwanese swimmer

Personal information
- Full name: Huang Chih-yung
- National team: Chinese Taipei
- Born: 18 October 1978 (age 47) Taipei, Taiwan
- Height: 1.78 m (5 ft 10 in)
- Weight: 67 kg (148 lb)

Sport
- Sport: Swimming
- Strokes: Freestyle, breaststroke
Medal record
Men's swimming
Representing Chinese Taipei
Asian Games
Bronze medal – third place	1998 Bangkok	100 m freestyle

Huang Chih-yung (Chinese: 黃 智勇; pinyin: Huáng Zhìyǒng; born October 18, 1978) is a Taiwanese former swimmer, who specialized in sprint freestyle events. He is a two-time Olympian (1996 and 2000), and a bronze medalist at the 1998 Asian Games.

Huang made his official debut, as a 17-year-old, at the 1996 Summer Olympics in Atlanta. He failed to reach the top 16 final in any of his individual events, finishing thirty-third in the 100 m breaststroke (1:05.26), thirty-fourth in the 200 m breaststroke (2:25.96), and fifty-sixth each in the 50 m freestyle (24.89) and in the 100 m freestyle (53.47).

Two years later, at the 1998 Asian Games in Bangkok, Thailand, Huang shared bronze medals with China's Zhao Lifeng and Chinese Taipei's Huang Chih-yung in the 100 m freestyle, with a matching time of 52.21.

Huang swam only in the men's 50 m freestyle at the 2000 Summer Olympics in Sydney. He eclipsed a FINA B-cut of 23.75 from the Asian Championships in Busan, South Korea. He challenged seven other swimmers in heat four, including Kyrgyzstan's Sergey Ashihmin, Goodwill Games silver medalist for Russia, and Kazakhstan's two-time Olympian Sergey Borisenko. Diving in with a 0.68-second deficit, Huang faded down the stretch to hit the wall for a seventh seed in 24.01, a slimmest margin closer to Peru's Luis López Hartinger and Singapore's Leslie Kwok (a matching time of 24.00). Huang failed to advance into the semifinals, as he placed fifty-first overall in the prelims. National record SCM 50m Freestyle (23.02), 100m Freestyle (50.16), 50m Breaststroke (28.47), 100m Breaststroke (1:01.81), 50m Backstroke (26.26), 50m Butterfly (24.61)
