= Shan Ying =

Chinese swimmer (born 1978)

Personal information
- Full name: Shan Ying
- Nationality: China
- Born: 7 August 1978 (age 47)
- Height: 1.72 m (5 ft 8 in)
- Weight: 67 kg (148 lb)

Sport
- Sport: Swimming
- Strokes: Freestyle
Medal record
Women's swimming
Representing China
Olympic Games
Silver medal – second place	1996 Atlanta	4×100 m freestyle
Bronze medal – third place	1996 Atlanta	4×100 m medley
World Championships (LC)
Gold medal – first place	1994 Rome	4×100 m freestyle
Bronze medal – third place	1998 Perth	50 m freestyle
Bronze medal – third place	1998 Perth	100 m freestyle
Asian Games
Gold medal – first place	1994 Hiroshima	100 m freestyle

Shan Ying (born 7 August 1978) is a Chinese swimmer and Olympic medalist. She participated in the 1996 Summer Olympics in Atlanta, winning a silver medal in the 4 x 100 metre freestyle relay and a bronze medal in the 4 x 100 metre medley relay.
