= Maksim Korshunov =

Russian swimmer

Personal information
- Born: 1977 (age 48–49)

Sport
- Sport: Swimming
Medal record
Representing Russia
European Championships
Bronze medal – third place	1999 Istanbul	4×200 m freestyle

Maxim Viktorovich Korshunov (Russian: Максим Викторович Коршунов; born 1977) is a Russian swimmer who won a bronze medal in the 4 × 200 m freestyle relay at the 1999 European Aquatics Championships.

He graduated in 2002 from the Moscow Sports Academy with a swimming coach degree and since 2001 works as a swimming coach. He continues to compete in swimming, in the masters category.
