= Lin Chi-chan =

Taiwanese swimmer

Personal information
- Full name: Lin Chi-chan
- Nationality: Chinese Taipei
- Born: 11 January 1980 (age 46) Taipei, Taiwan
- Height: 1.69 m (5 ft 7 in)
- Weight: 52 kg (115 lb)

Sport
- Sport: Swimming
- Strokes: Freestyle, backstroke
Medal record
Women's swimming
Representing Chinese Taipei
Asian Games
Bronze medal – third place	1998 Bangkok	4×100 m freestyle
Bronze medal – third place	1998 Bangkok	4×200 m freestyle

Lin Chi-chan (Chinese: 林 季嬋; pinyin: Lín Jìchán; born January 11, 1980) is a Taiwanese former swimmer, who specialized in long-distance freestyle but also competed in backstroke. She represented Chinese Taipei in two editions of the Olympic Games (1996 and 2000), and later earned two medals each in the 4 × 100 m freestyle relay (3:51.42), and 4 × 200 m freestyle relay (8:18.92) at the 1998 Asian Games in Bangkok, Thailand.

Lin made her first Chinese Taipei team, as a 16-year-old teen, at the 1996 Summer Olympics in Atlanta. There, she failed to medal in any of her individual events, finishing eleventh in the 400 m freestyle (4:15.74), ninth in the 800 m freestyle (8:40.31), and thirty-third in the 200 m backstroke (2:24.50). A member of the Chinese Taipei team, she placed eighteenth in the 4 × 100 m freestyle relay (3:56.39), and nineteenth in the 4 × 200 m freestyle relay (8:27.61).

At the 2000 Summer Olympics in Sydney, Lin drastically shortened her program, swimming only in a long-distance freestyle double. She achieved FINA B-standards of 4:20.19 (400 m freestyle) and 8:53.44 (800 m freestyle) from the National University Games in Taipei. On the second day of the Games, Lin placed twenty-fifth in the 400 m freestyle. Swimming in heat two, she raced to the fourth seed in 4:17.76, sufficiently enough for her lifetime best. Five days later, in the 800 m freestyle, Lin participated in heat one against three other swimmers Ivanka Moralieva of Bulgaria, Patricia Villarreal of Mexico, and Cecilia Biagioli of Argentina. Leading the first 250 metres of the race, she faded down the stretch over the remaining laps to pick up a third seed and twenty-fourth overall at 9:01.09.
