= Andrey Kvassov =

Kazakhstani-Kygyzstani swimmer

Personal information
- Full name: Andrey Kvassov
- National team: Kazakhstan; Kyrgyzstan
- Born: 16 January 1976 (age 50) Alma-Ata, Kazakh SSR, Soviet Union
- Height: 1.88 m (6 ft 2 in)
- Weight: 75 kg (165 lb)

Sport
- Sport: Swimming
- Strokes: Freestyle

Andrey Kvassov (Kazakh: Андрей Николаевич Квасов; born January 16, 1976) is a Kazakhstani-Kyrgyzstani former swimmer, who specialized in sprint and middle-distance freestyle events. He is a two-time Olympian (1996 and 2000), and a top 16 finalist at the 2002 Asian Games.

Kvassov made his official debut for Kyrgyzstan at the 1996 Summer Olympics in Atlanta. He failed to reach the top 16 final in the 400 m freestyle, finishing twenty-sixth in a time of 4:00.69. A member of the Kyrgyzstan team, he also placed eighteenth in the 4 × 100 m freestyle relay (3:30.62), and seventeenth in the 4 × 200 m freestyle relay (8:00.00).

At the 2000 Summer Olympics in Sydney, Kvassov competed only in two swimming events. He eclipsed a FINA B-cut of 1:53.76 (200 m freestyle) from the Kazakhstan Open Championships in Almaty. On the first day of the Games, Kvassov placed twenty-first for the Kazakhstan team in the 4 × 100 m freestyle relay. Teaming with Sergey Borisenko, Pavel Sidorov, and Igor Sitnikov in heat three, Kvassov swam a second leg and recorded a split of 52.25, but the Kazakhs settled only for last place in a final time of 3:28.90. The following day, in the 200 m freestyle, Kvassov placed forty-eighth on the morning prelims. Swimming in heat two, he touched out Cyprus' Alexandros Aresti for a seventh seed by almost a full body length in 1:55.72.

Two years later, at the 2002 Asian Games in Busan, South Korea, Kvassov failed to medal in any of his individual events, finishing sixteenth in the 50 m freestyle (24.13), and tenth in the 100 m freestyle (52.27).
