= Pavel Sidorov =

Kazakh swimmer

Personal information
- Full name: Pavel Sidorov
- National team: Kazakhstan
- Born: 8 August 1976 (age 49) Shymkent, Kazakh SSR, Soviet Union
- Height: 1.95 m (6 ft 5 in)
- Weight: 90 kg (198 lb)

Sport
- Sport: Swimming
- Strokes: Freestyle, backstroke
Medal record
Representing Kazakhstan
Asian Games
Bronze medal – third place	1998 Bangkok	4x100m freestyle relay
Bronze medal – third place	1998 Bangkok	4x100m medley relay

Pavel Sidorov (Kazakh: Павел Николаевич Сидоров; born August 8, 1976) is a Kazakh former swimmer, who specialized in sprint freestyle and backstroke events. Sidorov competed for Kazakhstan in two swimming events at the 2000 Summer Olympics in Sydney. He eclipsed a FINA B-cut of 58.69 (100 m backstroke) from the Kazakhstan Open Championships in Almaty. On the first day of the Games, Sidorov placed twenty-first for the Kazakhstan team in the 4×100 m freestyle relay. Teaming with Sergey Borisenko, Andrey Kvassov, and Igor Sitnikov in heat three, Sidorov swam a third leg and recorded a split of 52.14, but the Kazakhs settled only for last place in a final time of 3:28.90. The following day, in the 100 m backstroke, Sidorov placed fifty-second on the morning prelims. Swimming in heat one, he edged out Bolivia's Mauricio Prudencio on the final length to grab a fourth seed by 0.13 seconds in a time of 1:01.02.
