= Zhao Lifeng =

Chinese swimmer (born 1978)

Personal information
- Born: April 27, 1978 (age 48)

Sport
- Sport: Swimming
Medal record
Representing China
Asian Games
Silver medal – second place	1998 Bangkok	4x100m freestyle relay
Bronze medal – third place	1998 Bangkok	100m freestyle

Zhao Lifeng (born 27 April 1978) is a Chinese former swimmer who competed in the 1996 Summer Olympics.
