= Tomoko Hagiwara =

Japanese swimmer (born 1980)

Personal information
- Full name: 萩原 智子 (Hagiwara Tomoko)
- Nationality: Japan
- Born: April 13, 1980 (age 46) Osaka
- Height: 1.76 m (5 ft 9 in)
- Weight: 63 kg (139 lb)

Sport
- Sport: Swimming
- Strokes: Backstroke; Butterfly
Medal record
Women's swimming
World Championships (LC)
Bronze medal – third place	2001 Fukuoka	4x200m Freestyle
Pan Pacific Championships
Gold medal – first place	1999 Sydney	200m Backstroke
Gold medal – first place	2002 Yokohama	200m Medley
Bronze medal – third place	2002 Yokohama	4x100m Freestyle
Summer Universiade
Gold medal – first place	1999 Mallorca	100m Butterfly
Gold medal – first place	1999 Mallorca	200m Medley
Silver medal – second place	1999 Mallorca	100m Backstroke
Silver medal – second place	1999 Mallorca	200m Backstroke
Silver medal – second place	2001 Beijing	200m Backstroke

Tomoko Hagiwara (萩原 智子, Hagiwara Tomoko; born April 13, 1980 in Osaka, Japan) is a retired Japanese backstroke, butterfly and medley swimmer. She represented her native country at the 2000 Summer Olympics in Sydney, Australia. She is best known for winning two gold medals at the 1999 Summer Universiade in Palma de Mallorca. She also competed twice on Sasuke in the 28th and 29th competitions. In the 28th competition, she failed the Quintuple Step. In the 29th competition, she failed the Hedgehog.
