= Wu Nien-pin =

Taiwanese swimmer (born 1983)

Personal information
- Full name: Wu Nien-pin
- National team: Chinese Taipei
- Born: 4 February 1983 (age 43) Taipei, Taiwan
- Height: 1.81 m (5 ft 11 in)
- Weight: 80 kg (176 lb)

Sport
- Sport: Swimming
- Strokes: Freestyle, medley
- College team: National Taiwan University

Wu Nien-pin (Chinese: 吳念平; pinyin: Wú Niànpíng; born 4 February 1983) is a Taiwanese former swimmer, who specialized in freestyle and medley events. He is a two-time Olympian (2000 and 2004), and a seventh-place finalist in the 100 m freestyle at the 2002 Asian Games in Busan, South Korea. A graduate of information engineering at National Taiwan University in Taipei, Wu also trained full-time for the university's swimming squad.

Wu made his Olympic debut, as a 17-year-old teen, at the 2000 Summer Olympics in Sydney. He failed to reach the top 16 in any of his individual events, finishing fifty-fifth in the 100 m freestyle (52.72), thirty-eighth in the 200 m freestyle (1:54.58), and forty-fourth in the 200 m individual medley (2:08.85).

At the 2004 Summer Olympics in Athens, Wu swam only in two events with one day in between. He posted FINA B-standard entry times of 52.03 (100 m freestyle) and 2:08.12 (200 m individual medley) from the National University Games in Taipei. On the fifth day of the Games, Wu placed fifty-fourth in the 100 m freestyle. He edged out Singapore's Mark Chay to take a seventh spot in heat three by a quarter of a second (0.25) in 52.58. The following day, Wu managed to repeat a forty-fourth-place effort in the 200 m individual medley. Swimming in heat two, Wu saved a sixth spot over Turkey's Orel Oral by 0.12 of a second in 2:08.72.
