= Macau at the 1998 Asian Games =

- IOC code: MAC
- NOC: Macau Sports and Olympic Committee

in Bangkok
- Medals Ranked 28th: Gold 0 Silver 1 Bronze 0 Total 1

Asian Games appearances (overview)
- 1990; 1994; 1998; 2002; 2006; 2010; 2014; 2018; 2022; 2026

Macau participated in the 1998 Asian Games held in Bangkok, Thailand from 6 December 1998 to 20 December 1998 for the last time as a Portuguese territory before its transfer of sovereignty to China. Macau won only a single silver medal and finished at 28th position in a medal table.
