= Hong Kong at the 1998 Asian Games =

- IOC code: HKG
- NOC: Sports Federation and Olympic Committee of Hong Kong, China

in Bangkok
- Medals Ranked 13th: Gold 5 Silver 6 Bronze 6 Total 17

Asian Games appearances (overview)
- 1954; 1958; 1962; 1966; 1970; 1974; 1978; 1982; 1986; 1990; 1994; 1998; 2002; 2006; 2010; 2014; 2018; 2022; 2026

Hong Kong participated in the 1998 Asian Games held in Bangkok, Thailand from December 6, 1998 to December 20, 1998. Athletes from Hong Kong succeeded in winning 5 golds, 10 silvers and 14 bronzes, making total 29 medals. Hong Kong finished thirteenth in a medal table.
