= South Korea at the 1998 Asian Games =

- IOC code: KOR
- NOC: Korean Olympic Committee

in Bangkok
- Competitors: 537 in 31 sports
- Officials: 163
- Medals Ranked 2nd: Gold 65 Silver 46 Bronze 53 Total 164

Asian Games appearances (overview)
- 1954; 1958; 1962; 1966; 1970; 1974; 1978; 1982; 1986; 1990; 1994; 1998; 2002; 2006; 2010; 2014; 2018; 2022; 2026

South Korea (IOC designation:Korea) participated in the 1998 Asian Games held in Bangkok, Thailand from December 6 to December 20, 1998.

== Medal summary ==
=== Medal table ===
Sport	Gold	Silver	Bronze	Total
Taekwondo	11	1	0	12
Wrestling	7	0	2	9
Sailing	6	1	3	10
Fencing	5	5	2	12
Athletics	4	3	2	9
Archery	4	2	0	6
Judo	3	1	6	10
Soft tennis	3	0	1	4
Shooting	2	5	5	12
Bowling	2	3	1	6
Equestrian	2	3	0	5
Tennis	2	3	0	5
Cycling	2	1	2	5
Weightlifting	2	1	2	5
Handball	2	0	0	2
Rugby union	2	0	0	2
Table tennis	1	3	4	8
Badminton	1	2	4	7
Gymnastics	1	2	2	5
Hockey	1	1	0	2
Swimming	1	0	7	8
Baseball	1	0	0	1
Boxing	0	2	5	7
Synchronized swimming	0	2	0	2
Volleyball	0	2	0	2
Canoeing	0	1	2	3
Basketball	0	1	1	2
Golf	0	1	1	2
Cue sports	0	0	1	1
Totals (29 entries)	65	46	53	164
