= China at the 1998 Asian Games =

- IOC code: CHN
- NOC: Chinese Olympic Committee external link (in Chinese and English)

in Bangkok
- Medals Ranked 1st: Gold 129 Silver 78 Bronze 67 Total 274

Asian Games appearances (overview)
- 1974; 1978; 1982; 1986; 1990; 1994; 1998; 2002; 2006; 2010; 2014; 2018; 2022; 2026

China competed in the 1998 Asian Games which were held in Bangkok, Thailand from December 6, 1998, to December 20, 1998. It won 129 gold, 78 silver and 67 bronze medals.

== See also ==
- China at the Asian Games
- China at the Olympics
- Sport in China
