= Chinese Taipei at the 1998 Asian Games =

- IOC code: TPE
- NOC: Chinese Taipei Olympic Committee

in Bangkok
- Medals Ranked 6th: Gold 19 Silver 17 Bronze 41 Total 77

Asian Games appearances (overview)
- 1954; 1958; 1962; 1966; 1970; 1974–1986; 1990; 1994; 1998; 2002; 2006; 2010; 2014; 2018; 2022; 2026

Chinese Taipei participated in the 1998 Asian Games held in Bangkok, Thailand from December 6, 1998, to December 20, 1998. Athletes from Taiwan succeeded in winning 19 golds, 17 silvers and 41 bronzes, making for a total of 77 medals. Chinese Taipei finished sixth in the medal table.
