= Japan at the 1998 Asian Games =

- IOC code: JPN
- NOC: Japanese Olympic Committee

in Bangkok
- Competitors: 629 in 36 sports
- Flag bearer: Reika Utsugi
- Medals Ranked 3rd: Gold 52 Silver 61 Bronze 68 Total 181

Asian Games appearances (overview)
- 1951; 1954; 1958; 1962; 1966; 1970; 1974; 1978; 1982; 1986; 1990; 1994; 1998; 2002; 2006; 2010; 2014; 2018; 2022; 2026

Japan participated in the 1998 Asian Games held in Bangkok, Thailand from December 6, 1998 to December 20, 1998. This country was ranked 3rd with 52 gold medals, 61 silver medals and 68 bronze medals with a total of 181 medals to secure its third spot in the medal tally.
