= 1998 Asian Games =

Multi-sport event in Bangkok, Thailand

XIII Asian Games
- Host city: Bangkok, Thailand
- Motto: Friendship Beyond Frontiers (Thai: มิตรภาพไร้พรมแดน); Mitrp̣hāph rị̂ phrmdæn
- Nations: 41 (Note: Saudi Arabia boycotted from the event due to Blue Diamond Affair)
- Athletes: 6,554 (4,454 men, 2,100 women)
- Events: 377 in 36 sports
- Opening: 6 December 1998
- Closing: 20 December 1998
- Opened by: Bhumibol Adulyadej; King of Thailand
- Closed by: Vajiralongkorn; Crown Prince of Thailand
- Athlete's Oath: Preeda Chulamonthol
- Judge's Oath: Songsak Charoenpong
- Torch lighter: Somluck Kamsing
- Main venue: Rajamangala National Stadium
- Website: asiangames.th (archived)

Summer

Winter

The 1998 Asian Games (Thai: เอเชียนเกมส์ 2541 or เอเชียนเกมส์ 1998), officially known as the 13th Asian Games (Thai: กีฬาเอเชียนเกมส์ครั้งที่ 13) and the XIII Asiad,, or simply Bangkok 1998 (Thai: กรุงเทพมหานคร 1998), were an Asian multi-sport event celebrated in Bangkok, Thailand from December 6 to 20, 1998, with 377 events in 36 sports and disciplines participated by 6,554 athletes across the continent. The sporting events commenced on 30 November 1998, a week earlier than the opening ceremony. It is a last time that the multi-sport event would be held in Bangkok until the 2007 Summer Universiade.

Bangkok was awarded the right on September 26, 1990, defeating Taipei, Taiwan and Jakarta, Indonesia to host the Games. It was the first city to hosted the Asian Games for four times, but was the first time that the city make a bid to host. The last three editions it hosted were in 1966, 1970 and 1978 (in the latter two cases stepping in to prevent the Games from being cancelled due to problems with the elected hosts). The event was opened by Bhumibol Adulyadej, the king of Thailand, at the Rajamangala Stadium.

The final medal tally was led by China, followed by South Korea, Japan and the host Thailand. Thailand set a new record with 24 gold medals. Japanese Athletics Koji Ito was announced as the most valuable player (MVP) of the Games. For Thailand, it was considered one of its remarkable achievement in sports development throughout the country's modern history.

== Bidding process ==
Three cities placed a bid for the Games. All three, Taipei (Taiwan), Jakarta (Indonesia) and Bangkok (Thailand) submitted their formal bid in 1989. It was the first time that Thailand has presented a bid for host the Asian Games, as Bangkok was the default host of previous three games.

The vote was held on September 27, 1990, at the China Palace Tower Hotel in Beijing, China, during the 9th Olympic Council of Asia (OCA) General Assembly held during the 1990 Asian Games. All 37 members voted, with voting held in secret ballot. It was announced that Bangkok won an Asian Games bid process for the first time. Though the vote results were not released, was leaked to the press that Bangkok won by 20–10–7.

Bangkok became the first city to have staged the Asian Games for four editions, following 1966, 1970 and 1978, and this was the first time that the city had put a bid for the event.

19 votes were needed for selection.

1998 Asian Games bidding result
City	Country	Votes
Bangkok	Thailand	20
Taipei	Taiwan	10
Jakarta	Indonesia	7

== Development and preparation ==
=== Costs ===
According to United Press International news report, preparations for the games including the construction and renovation of three main stadiums and an athletes' village, cost an estimated 6 billion Thai baht (US$167 million).

=== Venues ===
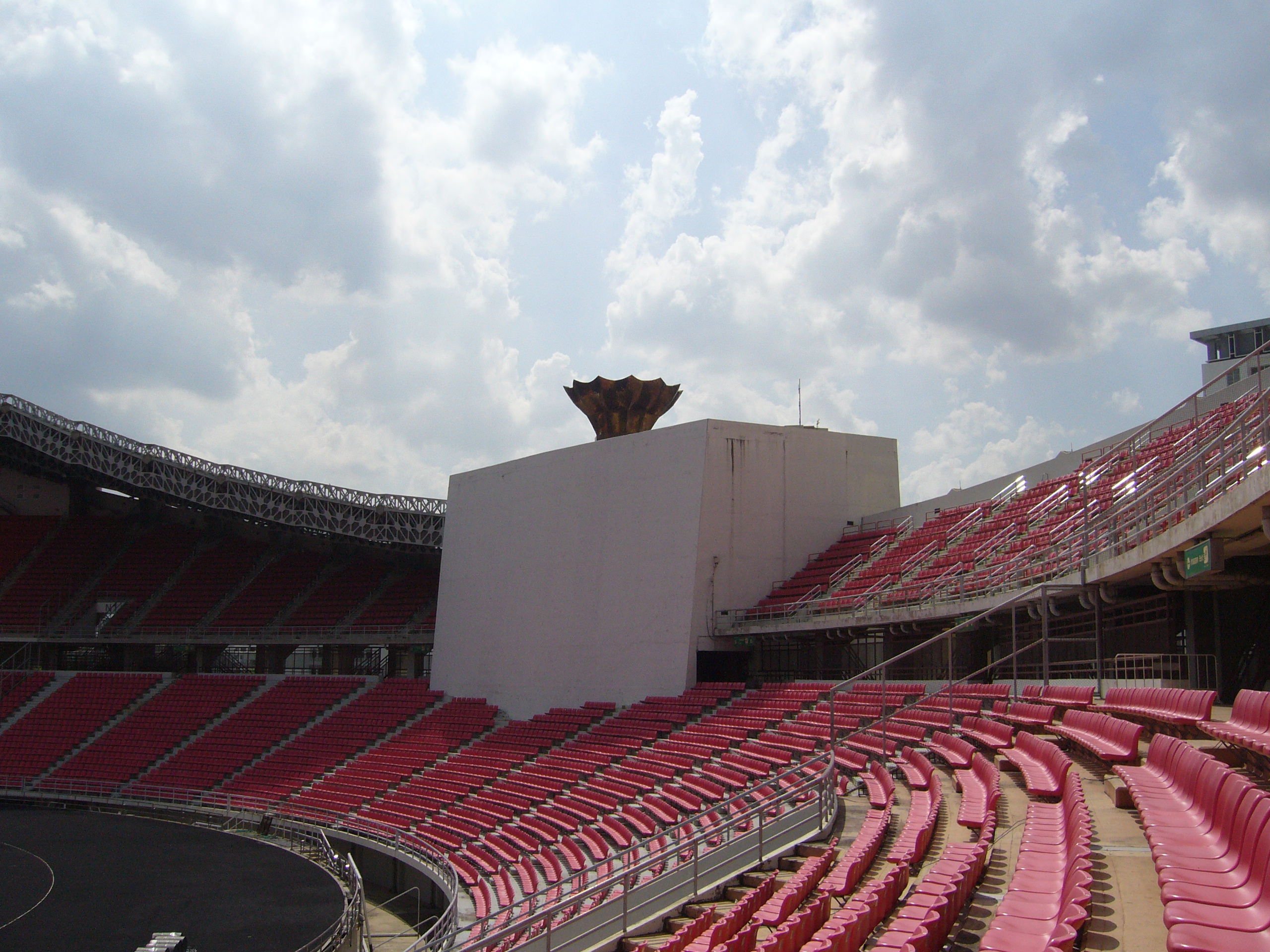
Cauldron for the Games at Rajamangala Stadium.

Bang Kapi district

- Rajmangala Stadium (Opening & Closing ceremonies, Football)
- Indoor Stadium (Sepak Takraw)
- Velodrome (Cycling track)
- Shooting Range (Shooting)
- Clay Target Shooting Range (Clay Target Shooting)

Muang Thong Thani

- IMPACT Arena:
- Hall 1-5 (Boxing, Billiards & Snooker, Gymnastics, Volleyball)
- Thunder Dome (Weightlifting)
- SCG Stadium (Rugby, Football)
- Tennis Centre (Tennis, Soft Tennis)

Thammasat University (Rangsit Campus)

- Main Stadium (Athletics and Football)
- Gymnasium 1 (Basketball, Judo, Wrestling)
- Gymnasium 2 (Badminton)
- Gymnasium 3 (Handball)
- Gymnasium 4 (Fencing)
- Gymnasium 5 (Table Tennis)
- Gymnasium 6 (Wushu)
- Gymnasium 7 (Karate, Taekwondo)
- Tennis Court (Soft Tennis)
- Field 1 (Archery)
- Field 2 (Softball)
- Aquatic Center (Aquatics)
- Athletes Village

Other venues
Bangkok and Phra Nakhon Si Ayutthaya

- Kasetsart University (Hockey)
- PS Bowling Bangkapi (Bowling)
- Suphachalasai Stadium (Football)
- Thai Army Sports Stadium (Rugby)
- Thai-Japanese Stadium (Football)
- Thupatemee Stadium (Football)

Chiang Mai

- 700th Anniversary Stadium (Football)

Chonburi

- Ambassador Sport Center (Squash)
- Ao-Dongtarn Jomtien Beach (Sailing)
- Jomtien Beach (Beach Volleyball)
- Map Prachan Reservoir (Canoeing, Rowing)

Nakhon Nayok

- Srinakharinwirot University (Ongkarak Campus) (Handball, Softball, Kabaddi)

Nakhon Ratchasima

- Khao Yai Rimtarn Resort (Cycling Mountain bike)
- Phahonyothin Road – (Cycling Road)

Nakhon Sawan

- Nakhon Sawan Province Central Stadium (Football)

Pathum Thani

- Alpine Golf and Sports Club (Golf)
- Queen Sirikit Sport Complex (Baseball, Hockey preliminaries)

Saraburi

- Fort Adhisorn Riding Club (Equestrian)

Sisaket

- Sisaket Province Central Stadium (Football)

Songkhla

- Suwannawong Gymnasium, Hat Yai (Sepak Takraw)
- Tinasulanon Stadium (Football)

Suphan Buri

- Municipal Gymnasium (Basketball)
- Suphan Buri Province Central Stadium (Football)

Surat Thani

- Surat Thani Province Central Stadium (Football)

Trang

- Trang Province Central Stadium (Football)
- Municipal Gymnasium (Sepak Takraw)

== Marketing ==
=== Emblem ===
The official emblem of the games combines elements from Thai stupas and pagodas, the letter "A", which means either "Asia" or "Athletes", and the logo of the Olympic Council of Asia. It symbolises the knowledge, intelligence and athletic prowess of Thailand.

=== Mascot ===
"Chai-Yo", the mascot of the games

The official mascot of the games is an elephant named Chai-Yo (ไชโย), the equivalent of "hurrah" in Thai. Elephants are known and admired among Thais for their strength and nobility.

== The Games ==
=== Opening ceremony ===
The opening ceremony started at 17:00 local time on December 6, 1998. It was attended by King of Thailand, Bhumibol Adulyadej, President of the International Olympic Committee Juan Antonio Samaranch and President of the OCA Sheikh Ahmed Al-Fahad Al-Ahmed Al-Sabah. The nations entered in alphabetic order of their country names in Thai during the parade of nations.

=== Participating National Olympic Committees ===
National Olympic Committees (NOCs) are named according to their official IOC designations and arranged according to their official IOC country codes in 1998.

Participating National Olympic Committees
- Bahrain (15)
- Bangladesh (44)
- Bhutan (21)
- Brunei (57)
- Cambodia (104)
- China (828)
- Hong Kong (290)
- India (328)
- Indonesia (213)
- Iran (318)
- Japan (965)
- Jordan (55)
- Kazakhstan (462)
- Kuwait (209)
- Kyrgyzstan (147)
- Laos (113)
- Lebanon (79)
- Macau (97)
- Malaysia (229)
- Maldives (50)
- Mongolia (198)
- Myanmar (76)
- Nepal (93)
- North Korea (299)
- Oman (52)
- Pakistan (139)
- Palestine (37)
- Philippines (386)
- Qatar (206)
- Saudi Arabia
- Singapore (194)
- South Korea (754)
- Sri Lanka (116)
- Syria (58)
- Chinese Taipei (508)
- Tajikistan (163)
- Thailand (1055) (host)
- Turkmenistan (77)
- United Arab Emirates (119)
- Uzbekistan (275)
- Vietnam (188)
- Yemen (32)

Note: Saudi Arabia boycotted using the argument that the event was being held during Ramadan, but latter was discovered that the real motive of the action the tense diplomatic relations between Thailand who were deteriorated by the Blue Diamond Affair. However, a Saudi representative still paraded in the Opening Ceremony.

== Number of athletes by National Olympic Committees (by highest to lowest) ==
IOC Letter Code	Country	Athletes
THA	Thailand	1055
JPN	Japan	965
CHN	China	828
KOR	South Korea	754
TPE	Chinese Taipei	508
KAZ	Kazakhstan	462
PHI	Philippines	386
IND	India	328
IRI	Iran	318
PRK	North Korea	299
HKG	Hong Kong	290
UZB	Uzbekistan	275
MAS	Malaysia	229
INA	Indonesia	213
KUW	Kuwait	209
QAT	Qatar	206
MGL	Mongolia	198
SIN	Singapore	194
VIE	Vietnam	188
TJK	Tajikistan	163
KGZ	Kyrgyzstan	147
PAK	Pakistan	139
UAE	United Arab Emirates	119
SRI	Sri Lanka	116
LAO	Laos	113
CAM	Cambodia	104
MAC	Macau	97
NEP	Nepal	93
LIB	Lebanon	79
TKM	Turkmenistan	77
MYA	Myanmar	76
SYR	Syria	58
BRU	Brunei	57
JOR	Jordan	55
OMA	Oman	52
MDV	Maldives	50
BAN	Bangladesh	44
PLE	Palestine	37
YEM	Yemen	32
BHU	Bhutan	21
BRN	Bahrain	15

=== Sports ===
- Aquatics
  - Diving (4)
  - Swimming (32)
  - Synchronized swimming (2)
  - Water polo (1)
- Archery (4)
- Athletics (45)
- Badminton (7)
- Baseball (1)
- Basketball (2)
- Bowling (10)
- Boxing (12)
- Canoeing (12)
- Cue sports (10)
- Cycling (15)
- Equestrian (6)
- Fencing (10)
- Field hockey (2)
- Football (2)
- Golf (4)
- Gymnastics (16)
- Handball (2)
- Judo (14)
- Kabaddi (1)
- Karate (11)
- Rowing (11)
- Rugby union (2)
- Sailing (16)
- Sepak takraw (6)
- Shooting (34)
- Softball (1)
- Soft tennis (4)
- Squash (2)
- Table tennis (7)
- Taekwondo (16)
- Tennis (7)
- Volleyball
  - Volleyball (2)
  - Beach volleyball (2)
- Weightlifting (15)
- Wrestling (16)
- Wushu (11)

Demonstration

- Dancesport () (2)
- Muaythai () (11)

== Medal table ==
The top ten ranked NOCs at these Games are listed below. The host nation, Thailand, is highlighted.

* Host nation (Thailand)

Rank	Nation	Gold	Silver	Bronze	Total
1	China (CHN)	129	78	67	274
2	South Korea (KOR)	65	46	53	164
3	Japan (JPN)	52	61	68	181
4	Thailand (THA)*	24	26	40	90
5	Kazakhstan (KAZ)	24	24	30	78
6	Chinese Taipei (TPE)	19	17	41	77
7	Iran (IRI)	10	11	13	34
8	North Korea (PRK)	7	14	12	33
9	India (IND)	7	11	17	35
10	Uzbekistan (UZB)	6	22	12	40
11–33	Remaining	35	70	114	219
Totals (33 entries)		378	380	467	1,225

== See also ==
- 1999 FESPIC Games
- 2025 SEA Games, similar premise where Cambodia will be withdraw from the event due to political issues.

Preceded by Hiroshima	Asian Games; Bangkok; XIII Asian Games (1998)	Succeeded by Busan
