= Swimming at the 1998 Asian Games – Women's 50 metre freestyle =

Women's 50 metre freestyle at the 1998 Asian Games
- Venue: Thammasat Aquatic Center
- Date: 12 December 1998
- Competitors: 23 from 16 nations

Medalists
gold medal	Shan Ying	China
silver medal	Han Xue	China
bronze medal	Sumika Minamoto	Japan

The women's 50 metre freestyle swimming competition at the 1998 Asian Games in Bangkok was held on 12 December at the Thammasat Aquatic Center.

== Schedule ==
All times are Indochina Time (UTC+07:00)

Date	Time	Event
Saturday, 12 December 1998	09:00	Heats
Saturday, 12 December 1998	18:00	Finals

== Results ==
Legend

- DNS — Did not start

=== Heats ===
Rank	Heat	Athlete	Time	Notes
1	2	Sumika Minamoto (JPN)	26.26	
2	3	Shan Ying (CHN)	26.60	
3	3	Yevgeniya Yermakova (KAZ)	26.67	
4	1	Han Xue (CHN)	26.75	
5	1	Junko Nakatani (JPN)	26.98	
6	1	Lin Meng-chieh (TPE)	27.15	
7	2	Lee Bo-eun (KOR)	27.17	
8	3	Chiang Tzu-ying (TPE)	27.37	
9	1	Kathy Echiverri (PHI)	27.39	
10	2	Hong Chan-lim (KOR)	27.40	
11	3	Lam Wai Man (MAC)	27.51	
12	1	Piyaporn Tantiniti (THA)	27.96	
13	1	Pang Shuk Mui (HKG)	27.97	
14	3	Chonlathorn Vorathamrong (THA)	28.14	
15	2	Nisha Millet (IND)	28.47	
16	2	Võ Trần Trường An (VIE)	28.75	
17	2	Phua Shu Yan (SIN)	29.04	
18	3	Lam Pui Chi (MAC)	29.16	
19	2	Rola El-Haress (LIB)	29.88	
20	1	Radeesha Daluwatte (SRI)	31.25	
21	3	Hem Raksmey (CAM)	34.88	
22	2	Nishma Gurung (NEP)	36.21	
—	3	Robyn Lamsam (HKG)	DNS	

=== Finals ===
==== Final B ====
Rank	Athlete	Time	Notes
1	Lam Wai Man (MAC)	27.50	
2	Hong Chan-lim (KOR)	27.70	
3	Piyaporn Tantiniti (THA)	27.78	
4	Chonlathorn Vorathamrong (THA)	27.81	
5	Pang Shuk Mui (HKG)	28.00	
6	Nisha Millet (IND)	28.05	
7	Võ Trần Trường An (VIE)	28.65	
—	Kathy Echiverri (PHI)	DNS	

==== Final A ====
Rank	Athlete	Time	Notes
1st place, gold medalist(s)	Shan Ying (CHN)	25.88	
2nd place, silver medalist(s)	Han Xue (CHN)	26.04	
3rd place, bronze medalist(s)	Sumika Minamoto (JPN)	26.08	
4	Yevgeniya Yermakova (KAZ)	26.09	
5	Junko Nakatani (JPN)	26.74	
6	Lin Meng-chieh (TPE)	26.79	
7	Chiang Tzu-ying (TPE)	27.07	
8	Lee Bo-eun (KOR)	27.40	
