= Swimming at the 1998 Asian Games – Women's 100 metre freestyle =

Women's 100 metre freestyle at the 1998 Asian Games
- Venue: Thammasat Aquatic Center
- Date: 7 December 1998
- Competitors: 21 from 14 nations

Medalists
gold medal	Shan Ying	China
silver medal	Sumika Minamoto	Japan
silver medal	Chao Na	China

The women's 100 metre freestyle swimming competition at the 1998 Asian Games in Bangkok was held on 7 December at the Thammasat Aquatic Center.

== Schedule ==
All times are Indochina Time (UTC+07:00)

Date	Time	Event
Monday, 7 December 1998	09:00	Heats
Monday, 7 December 1998	18:00	Finals

== Results ==
=== Heats ===
Rank	Heat	Athlete	Time	Notes
1	3	Sumika Minamoto (JPN)	57.20	
2	3	Junko Nakatani (JPN)	57.31	
3	1	Chao Na (CHN)	57.36	
4	3	Tsai Shu-min (TPE)	57.37	
5	2	Hong Chan-lim (KOR)	57.99	
6	2	Lin Meng-chieh (TPE)	58.14	
7	2	Shan Ying (CHN)	58.23	
8	1	Lee Bo-eun (KOR)	58.36	
9	3	Sherry Tsai (HKG)	58.89	
10	1	Piyaporn Tantiniti (THA)	59.63	
11	1	Kathy Echiverri (PHI)	59.73	
12	3	Lam Wai Man (MAC)	1:00.19	
13	3	Chonlathorn Vorathamrong (THA)	1:00.72	
14	2	Pang Shuk Mui (HKG)	1:01.41	
15	1	Võ Trần Trường An (VIE)	1:02.31	
16	2	Phua Shu Yan (SIN)	1:03.09	
17	2	Lam Pui Chi (MAC)	1:03.65	
18	1	Rola El-Haress (LIB)	1:04.58	
19	3	Radeesha Daluwatte (SRI)	1:07.46	
20	2	Hem Raksmey (CAM)	1:18.48	
21	1	Nishma Gurung (NEP)	1:20.23	

=== Finals ===
==== Final B ====
Rank	Athlete	Time	Notes
1	Sherry Tsai (HKG)	58.71	
2	Kathy Echiverri (PHI)	59.42	
3	Piyaporn Tantiniti (THA)	59.70	
4	Lam Wai Man (MAC)	1:00.55	
5	Chonlathorn Vorathamrong (THA)	1:00.62	
6	Pang Shuk Mui (HKG)	1:00.99	
7	Võ Trần Trường An (VIE)	1:01.60	
8	Phua Shu Yan (SIN)	1:02.19	

==== Final A ====
Rank	Athlete	Time	Notes
1st place, gold medalist(s)	Shan Ying (CHN)	56.20	
2nd place, silver medalist(s)	Sumika Minamoto (JPN)	56.39	
2nd place, silver medalist(s)	Chao Na (CHN)	56.39	
4	Tsai Shu-min (TPE)	56.67	
5	Junko Nakatani (JPN)	57.01	
6	Hong Chan-lim (KOR)	58.02	
7	Lee Bo-eun (KOR)	58.12	
8	Lin Meng-chieh (TPE)	58.50	
