= Swimming at the 2000 Summer Olympics – Women's 50 metre freestyle =

Women's 50 metre freestyle at the Games of the XXVII Olympiad
- Venue: Sydney International Aquatic Centre
- Date: 22 September 2000 (heats & semifinals); 23 September 2000 (final)
- Competitors: 74 from 66 nations
- Winning time: 24.32

Medalists
1st place, gold medalist(s)		Inge de Bruijn	Netherlands
2nd place, silver medalist(s)		Therese Alshammar	Sweden
3rd place, bronze medalist(s)		Dara Torres	United States

The women's 50 metre freestyle event at the 2000 Summer Olympics took place on 22–23 September at the Sydney International Aquatic Centre in Sydney, Australia.

Dutch rising star Inge de Bruijn added a third gold to her medal tally in swimming at these Games. She powered past the field to touch the wall first in 24.32, the second-fastest of all-time. Earlier in the semifinals, she blasted her own world record of 24.13 to snatch a top seed for the final. Sweden's Therese Alshammar captured the silver in 24.51, while U.S. legend Dara Torres powered home with the bronze in a new American record of 24.63, edging out defending Olympic champion Amy Van Dyken (25.04) by 41-hundredths of a second. The podium placements also replicated the results of the 100 m freestyle (with the exception of Jenny Thompson), held on the sixth night of the Games.

Slovakia's Martina Moravcová finished off the podium in fifth place at 25.24, and was followed in the sixth spot by Germany's Sandra Völker in 25.27. Great Britain's Alison Sheppard (25.45) and Japan's Sumika Minamoto (25.65) closed out the field.

Notable swimmers missed out the top 8 final, featuring Australia's overwhelming favorite Susie O'Neill; Völker's teammate Katrin Meissner, who shared bronze medals with Jill Sterkel in the event's inception in 1988 as a member of the former East German squad; and Estonia's Jana Kolukanova, who grabbed the final spot from the prelims after winning a three-person swimoff.

One of the most popular highlights in the event took place in the first heat. Dubbed as the Crawler, Paula Barila Bolopa had finally completed a unique double for Equatorial Guinea, as she swam the slowest ever race by a female in Olympic history with a time of 1:03.97.

== Records ==
Prior to this competition, the existing world and Olympic records were as follows.

World record	Inge de Bruijn (NED)	24.39	Rio de Janeiro, Brazil	10 June 2000
Olympic record	Yang Wenyi (CHN)	24.79	Barcelona, Spain	31 July 1992

The following new world and Olympic records were set during this competition.

Date	Event	Name	Nationality	Time	Record
22 September	Heat 10	Inge de Bruijn	Netherlands	24.46	OR
22 September	Semifinal 2	Inge de Bruijn	Netherlands	24.13	WR

== Results ==
=== Heats ===
Rank	Heat	Lane	Name	Nationality	Time	Notes
1	10	4	Inge de Bruijn	Netherlands	24.46	Q, OR
2	8	4	Dara Torres	United States	24.96	Q
3	10	5	Amy Van Dyken	United States	25.04	Q
4	9	4	Therese Alshammar	Sweden	25.24	Q
5	10	7	Martina Moravcová	Slovakia	25.39	Q, NR
6	9	5	Sandra Völker	Germany	25.44	Q
7	10	3	Sumika Minamoto	Japan	25.52	Q
7	10	1	Vivienne Rignall	New Zealand	25.52	Q, NR
9	8	5	Alison Sheppard	Great Britain	25.53	Q
10	10	2	Katrin Meissner	Germany	25.64	Q
11	10	6	Olga Mukomol	Ukraine	25.67	Q
12	8	7	Susie O'Neill	Australia	25.73	Q, OC
13	8	6	Anna-Karin Kammerling	Sweden	25.79	Q
14	9	3	Wilma van Rijn	Netherlands	25.81	Q
15	6	6	Rania Elwani	Egypt	25.87	Q, NR
16	6	7	Mette Jacobsen	Denmark	25.96	QSO
16	7	8	Jana Kolukanova	Estonia	25.96	QSO
16	9	7	Ana Belén Palomo	Spain	25.96	QSO
19	8	2	Cristina Chiuso	Italy	25.99	
20	8	3	Sue Rolph	Great Britain	26.00	
21	9	1	Han Xue	China	26.01	
22	8	8	Nadine Rolland	Canada	26.04	
23	8	1	Sarah Ryan	Australia	26.05	
23	6	1	Leah Martindale	Barbados	26.05	
25	9	8	Helene Muller	South Africa	26.07	
26	7	6	Alena Popchanka	Belarus	26.10	
27	9	2	Eileen Coparropa	Panama	26.19	
28	7	4	Liesbet Dreesen	Belgium	26.21	
28	7	7	Hanna-Maria Seppälä	Finland	26.21	
30	7	5	Ivana Walterová	Slovakia	26.23	
31	9	6	Judith Draxler	Austria	26.26	
32	6	3	Siobhan Cropper	Trinidad and Tobago	26.36	
33	7	3	Yekaterina Kibalo	Russia	26.37	
34	6	5	Lara Heinz	Luxembourg	26.55	
35	6	8	Caroline Pickering	Fiji	26.57	
36	6	2	Kirsty Coventry	Zimbabwe	26.58	
37	7	1	Joscelin Yeo	Singapore	26.71	
38	10	8	Jenna Gresdal	Canada	26.79	
39	1	4	Moe Thu Aung	Myanmar	26.80	
40	5	2	Chiang Tzu-ying	Chinese Taipei	26.84	
41	6	4	Chang Hee-jin	South Korea	26.88	
41	4	3	Yekaterina Tochenaya	Kyrgyzstan	26.88	NR
43	7	2	Athina Bochori	Greece	26.90	
44	5	8	Agnese Ozoliņa	Latvia	27.28	
45	5	3	Pilin Tachakittiranan	Thailand	27.31	
46	5	4	Marijana Šurković	Croatia	27.32	
47	5	7	Hiu Wai Sherry Tsai	Hong Kong	27.38	
48	5	6	Chantal Gibney	Ireland	27.46	
49	4	6	Angela Chuck	Jamaica	27.48	
50	5	1	Jūratė Ladavičiūtė	Lithuania	27.54	
51	5	5	Elín Sigurðardóttir	Iceland	27.58	
52	4	5	Marilyn Chua	Malaysia	27.66	
53	4	4	Duška Radan	FR Yugoslavia	27.70	
54	4	1	Maria Tregubova	Moldova	27.75	
55	4	7	Saida Iskandarova	Uzbekistan	28.08	
56	4	2	Talía Barrios	Peru	28.11	
57	3	5	Ngozi Monu	Nigeria	28.20	
58	3	7	Tanya Anacleto	Mozambique	28.78	
59	3	4	Alisa Khaleyeva	Azerbaijan	28.79	
60	3	8	Sherri Henry	Saint Lucia	28.81	
61	3	6	Mbolatiana Ramanisa	Madagascar	29.20	
62	3	2	Roshendra Vrolijk	Aruba	29.31	
63	3	3	Yuliana Mikheeva	Armenia	29.79	
64	2	5	Theekshana Ratnasekera	Sri Lanka	29.88	
65	2	3	Samar Nassar	Palestine	30.05	
66	2	6	Runa Pradhan	Nepal	31.28	
67	2	2	Teran Matthews	Saint Vincent and the Grenadines	31.71	
68	3	1	Francilla Agar	Dominica	32.22	
69	2	7	Fariha Fathimath	Maldives	32.36	
70	2	1	Hem Raksmey	Cambodia	33.11	
71	2	4	Noor Haki	Iraq	35.51	
72	4	8	Aissatou Barry	Guinea	35.79	
73	1	3	Paula Barila Bolopa	Equatorial Guinea	1:03.97	
	1	5	Fatema Hameed Gerashi	Bahrain	DSQ	

==== Swimoff ====
Rank	Lane	Name	Nationality	Time	Notes
1	5	Jana Kolukanova	Estonia	25.87	Q, NR
2	4	Mette Jacobsen	Denmark	26.00	
	3	Ana Belén Palomo	Spain	DSQ	

=== Semifinals ===
==== Semifinal 1 ====
Rank	Lane	Name	Nationality	Time	Notes
1	5	Therese Alshammar	Sweden	24.80	Q
2	4	Dara Torres	United States	24.98	Q
3	3	Sandra Völker	Germany	25.22	Q
4	6	Sumika Minamoto	Japan	25.43	Q
5	2	Katrin Meissner	Germany	25.62	
6	7	Susie O'Neill	Australia	25.74	
7	1	Wilma van Rijn	Netherlands	25.87	
8	8	Jana Kolukanova	Estonia	26.03	

==== Semifinal 2 ====
Rank	Lane	Name	Nationality	Time	Notes
1	4	Inge de Bruijn	Netherlands	24.13	Q, WR
2	5	Amy Van Dyken	United States	25.00	Q
3	2	Alison Sheppard	Great Britain	25.32	Q
4	3	Martina Moravcová	Slovakia	25.49	Q
5	1	Anna-Karin Kammerling	Sweden	25.61	
5	6	Vivienne Rignall	New Zealand	25.61	
7	7	Olga Mukomol	Ukraine	25.88	
8	8	Rania Elwani	Egypt	25.95	

=== Final ===
Rank	Lane	Name	Nationality	Time	Notes
1st place, gold medalist(s)	4	Inge de Bruijn	Netherlands	24.32	
2nd place, silver medalist(s)	5	Therese Alshammar	Sweden	24.51	
3rd place, bronze medalist(s)	3	Dara Torres	United States	24.63	AM
4	6	Amy Van Dyken	United States	25.04	
5	8	Martina Moravcová	Slovakia	25.24	NR
6	2	Sandra Völker	Germany	25.27	
7	7	Alison Sheppard	Great Britain	25.45	
8	1	Sumika Minamoto	Japan	25.65	
