= Swimming at the 2005 World Aquatics Championships – Women's 50 metre freestyle =

Women's 50m Freestyle at the 2005 FINA World Aquatics Championships
- Dates: 30 July (heats and semifinals); 31 July (final)
- Competitors: 86 from 64 nations
- Winning time: 24.59 seconds

Medalists
gold medal	Libby Lenton	Australia
silver medal	Marleen Veldhuis	Netherlands
bronze medal	Zhu Yingwen	China

The Women's 50m Freestyle event at the 11th FINA World Aquatics Championships was swum 30 – 31 July 2005 in Montreal, Quebec, Canada. Preliminary heats and Semifinal heats were 30 July; the final was 31 July.

At the start of the event, the existing World (WR) and Championships (CR) records were:

- WR: 24.13, Inge de Bruijn (Netherlands) swum 22 September 2000 in Sydney, Australia
- CR: 24.45, Inge de Bruijn (Netherlands) swum 28 July 2001 in Fukuoka, Japan

== Results ==
=== Final ===
Rank	Swimmer	Nation	Time	Notes
1st place, gold medalist(s)	Libby Lenton	Australia	24.59	
2nd place, silver medalist(s)	Marleen Veldhuis	Netherlands	24.83	
3rd place, bronze medalist(s)	Yingwen Zhu	China	24.91	
4	Therese Alshammar	Sweden	24.96	
5	Alice Mills	Australia	25.02	
6	Svitlana Khakhlova	Belarus	25.17	
7	Kara Lynn Joyce	USA	25.36	
8	Jana Kolukanova	Estonia	25.56	

=== Semifinals ===
Rank	Heat + Lane	Swimmer	Nation	Time	Notes
1	S1 L5	Marleen Veldhuis	Netherlands	24.92	q
2	S1 L4	Therese Alshammar	Sweden	24.99	q
3	S2 L3	Libby Lenton	Australia	25.05	q
4	S2 L4	Alice Mills	Australia	25.10	q
4	S2 L5	Yingwen Zhu	China	25.10	q
6	S1 L3	Kara Lynn Joyce	USA	25.14	q
6	S2 L2	Svitlana Khakhlova	Belarus	25.14	q
8	S1 L2	Jana Kolukanova	Estonia	25.28	q
9	S2 L6	Malia Metella	France	25.35	
10	S2 L1	Amanda Weir	USA	25.46	
11	S1 L1	Cristina Chiuso	Italy	25.51	
12	S1 L6	Flavia Cazziolato	Brazil	25.53	
13	S2 L8	Celine Couderc	France	25.64	
14	S2 L7	Hanna-Maria Seppälä	Finland	25.70	
15	S1 L7	Anna-Karin Kammerling	Sweden	25.75	
16	S1 L8	Nery-Mantey Niangkouara	Greece	25.78	

=== Preliminaries ===
Rank	Heat + Lane	Swimmer	Nation	Time	Notes
1	H11 L4	Alice Mills	Australia	25.15	
2	H11 L5	Therese Alshammar	Sweden	25.19	
3	H9 L7	Yingwen Zhu	China	25.22	
4	H9 L5	Marleen Veldhuis	Netherlands	25.27	
5	H10 L4	Lisbeth Lenton	Australia	25.29	
5	H10 L5	Kara Lynn Joyce	United States	25.29	
7	H9 L4	Malia Metella	France	25.42	
8	H10 L3	Flavia Cazziolato	Brazil	25.55	
9	H9 L3	Svitlana Khakhlova	Belarus	25.56	
10	H9 L8	Jana Kolukanova	Estonia	25.64	
11	H9 L2	Hanna-Maria Seppälä	Finland	25.65	
12	H11 L3	Anna-Karin Kammerling	Sweden	25.68	
13	H10 L2	Amanda Weir	United States	25.69	
14	H11 L2	Cristina Chiuso	Italy	25.71	
15	H10 L7	Celine Couderc	France	25.83	
16	H11 L6	Nery-Mantey Niangkouara	Greece	25.91	
17	H9 L6	Chantal Groot	Netherlands	25.94	
18	H11 L8	Nichola Chellingworth	New Zealand	25.95	
19	H11 L7	Martina Moravcová	Slovakia	26.19	
20	H10 L1	Triin Aljand	Estonia	26.23	
21	H8 L7	Vanessa García	Puerto Rico	26.24	
22	H8 L5	Binan Wu	China	26.26	
23	H8 L6	Kaori Yamada	Japan	26.39	
24	H7 L4	Ragnheidur Ragnarsdottir	Iceland	26.42	
25	H8 L1	Petra Klosova	Czech Republic	26.47	
26	H11 L1	Maryia Hanchar	Belarus	26.48	
27	H7 L3	Ionela Cozma	Romania	26.49	
27	H8 L8	Atsumi Yamada	Japan	26.49	
29	H10 L8	Jeanette Ottesen	Denmark	26.51	
30	H7 L5	Hannah Wilson	Hong Kong	26.53	
31	H8 L2	Alison Fitch	New Zealand	26.60	
32	H4 L6	Heather Brand	Zimbabwe	26.65	
33	H7 L1	Keo Ra Lee	South Korea	26.68	
34	H7 L8	Jennifer Carroll	Canada	26.69	
35	H8 L3	Pin-Chieh Nieh	Chinese Taipei	26.72	
36	H6 L6	Hang Yu Sze	Hong Kong	26.74	
37	H7 L6	Joscelin Yeo	Singapore	27.00	
38	H7 L7	Shikha Tandon	India	27.04	
39	H6 L3	Chin-Kuei Yang	Chinese Taipei	27.08	
40	H6 L4	Shu Yong Ho	Singapore	27.16	
41	H7 L2	Annette Hansen	Denmark	27.23	
42	H6 L7	Yamilé Bahamonde	Ecuador	27.28	
43	H6 L2	Irina Shlemova	Uzbekistan	27.43	
44	H6 L8	Nikia Deveaux	Bahamas	27.49	
45	H5 L5	Carolina Colorado Henao	Colombia	27.70	
46	H5 L3	Anna Liza Mopio Jane	Papua New Guinea	27.72	
47	H6 L1	Sarah Chahed	Tunisia	27.73	
48	H4 L3	Alexis Jordan	Barbados	27.77	
49	H5 L7	Melissa Vincent	Mauritius	27.80	
50	H5 L4	Gisela Morales	Guatemala	27.89	
50	H5 L8	Kiera Aitken	Bermuda	27.89	
52	H5 L6	Samantha Fajardo	Ecuador	27.90	
53	H4 L8	Carolina Cerqueda	Andorra	28.13	
54	H5 L2	Ashley Aitken	Bermuda	28.19	
55	H4 L1	Jasna Ovsenik	Slovenia	28.23	
56	H4 L7	Jakie Wellman	Zambia	28.27	
56	H5 L1	Khadija Ciss	Senegal	28.27	
58	H3 L4	Cheok Mei Ma	Macau	28.32	
59	H4 L5	Sharon Fajardo	Honduras	28.59	
60	H2 L4	Mbolatiana Ramanisa	Madagascar	28.99	
61	H4 L2	Man Wai Fong	Macau	29.06	
62	H3 L7	Katerine Moreno	Bolivia	29.08	
63	H3 L6	Jonay Briedenhann	Namibia	29.38	
64	H4 L4	Mireille Hakimeh	Syria	29.42	
65	H2 L5	Rubab Raza	Pakistan	29.57	
66	H3 L1	Jessica Vieira	Mozambique	29.61	
67	H3 L2	Binta Zahra Diop	Senegal	30.07	
68	H3 L8	Heba Bashouti	Jordan	30.34	
69	H2 L1	Aya Nakitanda	Uganda	30.51	
70	H2 L6	Sussie Pineda	Honduras	30.54	
71	H2 L7	Aminath Rouya	Maldives	30.62	
72	H2 L3	Kiran Khan	Pakistan	31.18	
73	H2 L2	Sameera Al Bitar	Bahrain	31.19	
74	H2 L8	Christal Clashing	Antigua and Barbuda	31.45	
75	H1 L5	Oshin Bharati	Nepal	34.14	
76	H1 L6	Raksmey Hem	Cambodia	35.29	
–	H1 L2	Ayele Sika Ornella Pamela Dossavi	Togo	DNS	
–	H1 L3	Yelena Rojkova	Turkmenistan	DNS	
–	H1 L4	Anifath F.M. Okanla	Benin	DNS	
–	H1 L7	Lasm Quissoh Genevieve Meledje	Ivory Coast	DNS	
–	H3 L3	Eliane Droubry Dohi	Ivory Coast	DNS	
–	H3 L5	Lenient Obia	Nigeria	DNS	
–	H6 L5	Jiratida Phinyosophon	Thailand	DNS	
–	H8 L4	Fabienne Nadarajah	Austria	DNS	
–	H9 L1	Daniela Gotz	Germany	DNS	
–	H10 L6	Rebeca Gusmão	Brazil	DNS	
