= Teran Matthews =

Saint Vincent and the Grenadines swimmer (born 1980)

Personal information
- Full name: Teran Matthews
- National team: St. Vincent
- Born: 14 February 1980 (age 46)
- Height: 1.65 m (5 ft 5 in)
- Weight: 56 kg (123 lb)

Sport
- Sport: Swimming
- Strokes: Freestyle

Teran Matthews (born February 14, 1980) is a former swimmer from Saint Vincent and the Grenadines, who specialized in sprint freestyle events. Matthews competed only in the women's 50 m freestyle at the 2000 Summer Olympics in Sydney. She received a ticket from FINA, under a Universality program, in an entry time of 31.87. She challenged six other swimmers in heat two, including Cambodia's two-time Olympian Hem Raksmey and Maldives' 13-year-old Fariha Fathimath. Diving in with a 0.94-second deficit, she scorched the field with a quick pace to a fifth-seeded time of 31.87 and slash off her entry standard by 16-hundredths of a second. Matthews failed to advance into the semifinals, as she placed sixty-seventh overall in the prelims.
