= Runa Pradhan =

Nepalese swimmer

Personal information
- Full name: Runa Pradhan
- National team: Nepal
- Born: 5 December 1984 (age 41) Kathmandu, Nepal
- Height: 1.55 m (5 ft 1 in)
- Weight: 48 kg (106 lb)

Sport
- Sport: Swimming
- Strokes: Freestyle

Runa Pradhan (Nepali: रुना प्रधान) (born December 5, 1984) is a Nepalese former swimmer, who specialized in sprint freestyle events. Pradhan competed for Nepal, as a 15-year-old teen, in the women's 50 m freestyle at the 2000 Summer Olympics in Sydney. She received a ticket from FINA, under a Universality program, in an entry time of 31.70. She challenged six other swimmers in heat two, including Cambodia's two-time Olympian Hem Raksmey and Maldives' 13-year-old Fariha Fathimath. She scorched the field to race for the third seed in 31.28, cutting off her lifetime best and a Nepalese record by 0.42 seconds. Pradhan failed to advance into the semifinals, as she placed sixty-sixth overall in the prelims.
