= Iceland at the 2000 Summer Olympics =

- IOC code: ISL
- NOC: National Olympic and Sports Association of Iceland
- Website: www.isi.is (in Icelandic)

in Sydney
- Competitors: 18 (9 men and 9 women) in 5 sports
- Flag bearer: Gudrún Arnardóttir
- Medals Ranked 71st: Gold 0 Silver 0 Bronze 1 Total 1

Summer Olympics appearances (overview)
- 1908; 1912; 1920–1932; 1936; 1948; 1952; 1956; 1960; 1964; 1968; 1972; 1976; 1980; 1984; 1988; 1992; 1996; 2000; 2004; 2008; 2012; 2016; 2020; 2024

Iceland competed at the 2000 Summer Olympics in Sydney, Australia.

== Medalists ==
Medal	Name	Sport	Event
Bronze	Vala Flosadóttir	Athletics	Women's pole vault

== Delegation ==
Name	Sport/Profession	Achievements
Stefán Konráðsson	delegation leader	
Líney Rut Halldórsdóttir	assistant delegation leader	
Ágúst Kárason	physician	
Gauti Grétarsson	physiotherapist	

=== Gymnastics ===
Name	Sport/Profession	Achievements
Árni Þór Árnason	group leader – gymnastics	
Mati Kirmes	trainer – gymnastics	
Rúnar Alexandersson	gymnastics	
Björn Magnús Tómasson	judge	

=== Athletics ===
Name	Sport/Profession	Achievements
Vésteinn Hafsteinsson	group leader – track & field	
Gísli Sigurðsson	trainer – track & field	
Stanislav Szczyrba	trainer – track & field	
Paul Doyle	trainer – track & field	
Guðrún Arnardóttir	400 m hurdle	54.63 s 7th place
Jón Arnar Magnússon	decathlon	quit because of injury
Magnús Aron Hallgrímsson	discus	60.95 m 21st place
Martha Ernstdóttir	marathon	quit because of injury
Vala Flosadóttir	pole vault	4.50 m 3rd place, Bronze
Þórey Edda Elísdóttir	pole vault	4.00 m 22nd place

=== Sailing ===
Name	Sport/Profession	Achievements
Birgir Ari Hilmarsson	group leader and trainer	
Hafsteinn Ægir Geirsson	sailing	42nd place

=== Shooting ===
Name	Sport/Profession	Achievements
Halldór Axelsson	group leader	
Peter Päkk	trainer	
Alfreð Karl Alfreðsson	marksmanship	47th place

=== Swimming ===
Name	Sport/Profession	Achievements
Benedikt Sigurðarson	group leader	
Brian Daniel Marshall	national team trainer	
Sigurlín Þóra Þorbergsdóttir	assistant trainer	
Ragnar Friðbjarnarson	assistant trainer	
Elín Sigurðardóttir	50 m freestyle	27.58 s 51st place
Eydís Konráðsdóttir	100 m butterfly	1:03.27 min 39th place
Hjalti Guðmundsson	100 m breaststroke	1:05.55 min 52nd place
Íris Edda Heimisdóttir	100 and 200 m breaststroke	1:14.07 min in 100 m 33rd place. 2:38.52 min. in 200 m 32nd place
Jakob Jóhann Sveinsson	200 m breaststroke	2:17.86 min 25th place – Icelandic record
Kolbrún Ýr Kristjánsdóttir	100 and 200 m backstroke	1:07.28 min in 100 m 43rd place. 2:24.33 mi in 200 m 32nd place
Lára Hrund Bjargardóttir	100 and 200 m freestyle	58.44 s in 100 m 36th place. 2:05.22 min in 200 m 27th place
Ríkarður Ríkarðsson	100 m butterfly stroke and 100 m freestyle	56.11 s in 100 m butterfly. 48th place – Icelandic record. 52.85 s in 100 m crawl. 58th place.
Örn Arnarson	200 m crawl and 200 m backstroke	1:49.78 min in 200 m freestyle 10th place – Icelandic record, made it to the semifinals. 1:59.00 min in 200 m back. 4th place (1:58.99 in one round – Icelandic record).

== Results by event ==
=== Athletics ===
Key

- Note–Ranks given for track events are within the athlete's heat only
- Q = Qualified for the next round
- q = Qualified for the next round as a fastest loser or, in field events, by position without achieving the qualifying target
- NR = National record
- N/A = Round not applicable for the event
- Bye = Athlete not required to compete in round

Men
Field events

Athlete	Event	Qualification		Final	
Athlete	Event	Distance	Position	Distance	Position
Jón Arnar Magnússon	Discus throw	60.95		Did not advance	

Women
Track & road events

Athlete	Event	Heat		Semifinal		Final	
Athlete	Event	Result	Rank	Result	Rank	Result	Rank
Guðrún Arnardóttir	400 m hurdles	56.30		54.82		54.63	7
Martha Ernstdóttir	Marathon	—N/a				DNF	

Field events

Athlete	Event	Qualification		Final	
Athlete	Event	Distance	Position	Distance	Position
Vala Flosadóttir	pole vault	4.30	1	4.50 NR	3rd place, bronze medalist(s)
Þórey Edda Elísdóttir	pole vault	4.00	22	Did not advance	

Combined events – Decathlon

Athlete	Event	100 m	LJ	SP	HJ	400 m	110H	DT	PV	JT	1500 m	Final	Rank
Jón Arnar Magnússon	Result	10.85	NR	15.48	DNS	—	—	—	—	—	—	DNF	
Jón Arnar Magnússon	Points											DNF	

=== Gymnastics ===
Men's artistic individual all-around

- Rúnar Alexandersson (50th place)

=== Sailing ===
Open

Athlete	Event	Race											Net points	Final rank
Athlete	Event	1	2	3	4	5	6	7	8	9	10	M*	Net points	Final rank
Hafsteinn Ægir Geirsson	Laser	41	42	21	39	36	42	41	39	OCS (-44)	DNF (-44)	DNF (44)	355	42

=== Shooting ===
Men's Skeet

- Alfred Karl Alfredsson (47th place)

=== Swimming ===
Men

Athlete	Event	Heat		Semifinal		Final	
Athlete	Event	Time	Rank	Time	Rank	Time	Rank
Ríkarður Ríkarðsson	100 m freestyle	52.85		Did not advance			
Ríkarður Ríkarðsson	100 m butterfly	56.11		Did not advance			
Örn Arnarson	200 m freestyle	1:49.78		1:50.41		Did not advance	
Örn Arnarson	200 m backstroke	1:59.80		1:58.99		1:59.00	4
Hjalti Guðmundsson	100 m breaststroke	1:05.55		Did not advance			
Jakob Jóhann Sveinsson	200 m breaststroke	2:17.86		Did not advance			

Women

Athlete	Event	Heat		Semifinal		Final	
Athlete	Event	Time	Rank	Time	Rank	Time	Rank
Elín Sigurðardóttir	50 m freestyle	27.58		Did not advance			
Lára Hrund Bjargardóttir	100 m freestyle	58.44		Did not advance			
Lára Hrund Bjargardóttir	200 m freestyle	2:05.22		Did not advance			
Eydís Konráðsdóttir	100 m butterfly	1:03.27		Did not advance			
Íris Edda Heimisdóttir	100 m breaststroke	1:14.07		Did not advance			
Íris Edda Heimisdóttir	200 m breaststroke	2:38.52		Did not advance			
Kolbrún Ýr Kristjánsdóttir	100 m backstroke	1:07.28		Did not advance			
Kolbrún Ýr Kristjánsdóttir	200 m backstroke	2:24.33		Did not advance			
