= Elín Sigurðardóttir =

Icelandic swimmer (born 1973)

Personal information
- Full name: Elín Sigurðardóttir
- National team: Iceland
- Born: 15 January 1973 (age 53) Hafnarfjörður, Iceland
- Height: 1.73 m (5 ft 8 in)
- Weight: 65 kg (143 lb)

Sport
- Sport: Swimming
- Strokes: Freestyle

Elín Sigurðardóttir (born 15 January 1973) is an Icelandic former swimmer, who specialized in sprint freestyle events. Sigurdardottir represented Iceland at the 1996 and 2000 Olympic Games, and also held an Icelandic record in the 50 m freestyle, before it was eventually broken by Ragnheiður Ragnarsdóttir and Sarah Blake Bateman.

Sigurdardottir made her first Icelandic team at the 1996 Summer Olympics in Atlanta. Swimming in heat three of the women's 50 m freestyle, she raced to a sixth seed and 37th overall in 26.90, a third of a second behind leader Dominique Diezi of Switzerland.

At the 2000 Summer Olympics in Sydney, Sigurdardottir competed again in the 50 m freestyle. She achieved a FINA B-cut of 26.93 from the Mare Nostrum meet in Barcelona, Spain. She challenged seven other swimmers in heat five, including teenagers Chiang Tzu-ying of Chinese Taipei, Marijana Šurković of Croatia, and Jūratė Ladavičiūtė of Lithuania. Diving in with a 0.79-second deficit, Sigurdardottir faded down the stretch on the final 15-metre mark to last place in 27.58, almost a full second behind leader Chiang. Sigurdardottir failed to advance into the semifinals, as she placed 51st overall out of 74 swimmers in the prelims.
