= Marilyn Chua =

Malaysian swimmer (born 1980)

Personal information
- Full name: Marilyn Chua Yu Ching
- National team: Malaysia
- Born: 25 August 1980 (age 46) Selangor, Malaysia
- Height: 1.63 m (5 ft 4 in)
- Weight: 62 kg (137 lb)

Sport
- Sport: Swimming
- Strokes: Freestyle
- College team: University of California, Los Angeles (U.S.)
- Coach: Cyndi Gallagher (U.S.)

Marilyn Chua Yu Ching (born 25 August 1980) is a Malaysian former swimmer, who specialised in sprint freestyle events. Chua represented Malaysia, as a 20-year-old, at the 2000 Summer Olympics, and formerly held a Malaysian record in the 50 m freestyle, before it was eventually broken by Cindy Ong in 2004. Chua also attended the University of California, Los Angeles, where she majored in international development studies and swam for the UCLA Bruins, under head coach Cyndi Gallagher.

Chua competed only in the women's 50 m freestyle at the 2000 Summer Olympics in Sydney. She achieved a FINA B-cut of 27.16 from the Janet Evans Invitational in Los Angeles, California. She challenged seven other swimmers in heat four, including Russian import Yekaterina Tochenaya of Kyrgyzstan, and Yugoslavia's two-time Olympian Duška Radan. Chua faded down the stretch to a third seed in 27.66, exactly half a second (0.50) below her national record and an entry standard, and 0.78 seconds off a leading time set by Tochenaya. Chua failed to advance into the semifinals, as she placed fifty-second overall out of 74 swimmers in the prelims.
