= Talía Barrios =

Peruvian swimmer (born 1980)

Personal information
- Full name: Talía Barrios
- National team: Peru
- Born: 22 November 1980 (age 45) Lima, Peru
- Height: 1.68 m (5 ft 6 in)
- Weight: 53 kg (117 lb)

Sport
- Sport: Swimming
- Strokes: Freestyle
- Club: Bolles School Sharks (U.S.)

Talía Barrios (born November 22, 1980) is a Peruvian former swimmer who specialized in sprint freestyle events. She represented Peru at the 2000 Summer Olympics, and also trained with the Bolles School Swim Club in Fort Lauderdale, Florida under head coaches Larry Shofe and Gregg Troy.

Barrios competed only in the women's 50 m freestyle at the 2000 Summer Olympics in Sydney. She achieved a FINA B-cut of 27.22 from the Pan American Games in Winnipeg, Manitoba, Canada. In heat four, she faced seven other swimmers including Russian import Yekaterina Tochenaya of Kyrgyzstan, and Yugoslavia's two-time Olympian Duška Radan. Barrios secured a seventh place, finishing 7.68 seconds ahead of Guinea's Aissatou Barry with a time of 28.11. However, she did not advance to the semifinals, placing fifty-second overall out of 74 swimmers in the prelims.
