= Athina Bochori =

Greek swimmer

Personal information
- Full name: Athina Bochori
- National team: Greece
- Born: 26 July 1978 (age 47) Volos, Thessalia, Greece
- Height: 1.79 m (5 ft 10 in)
- Weight: 63 kg (139 lb)

Sport
- Sport: Swimming
- Strokes: Freestyle
- Club: Panathinaikos Athina
- Coach: Evangelios Voultsou

Athina Bochori (Greek: Αθηνά Μποχώρη; born July 26, 1978) is a Greek former swimmer, who specialized in sprint freestyle events. She represented Greece at the 2000 Summer Olympics, held numerous Greek swimming records, including the 50 m freestyle, and also trained for Panathinaikos Athina Swim Club, under her longtime coach and mentor Evangelios Voultsou.

Bochori competed only in the women's 50 m freestyle at the 2000 Summer Olympics in Sydney. She achieved a FINA B-standard of 26.09 from Akropolis International Meet in Athens. She challenged seven other swimmers in heat seven, including Finland's 15-year-old Hanna-Maria Seppälä and Singapore's three-time Olympian Joscelin Yeo. Bochori closed out the field to last place in 26.90, almost a full second behind leader Jana Kolukanova of Estonia. Bochori failed to advance into the semifinals, as she placed forty-third out of 74 swimmers in the prelims.
