= Swimming at the 2005 World Aquatics Championships – Women's 100 metre freestyle =

Women's 100m freestyle at the 2005 FINA World Aquatics Championships
- Dates: 28 July (prelims and semifinals); 29 July (final)
- Competitors: 86 from 64 nations
- Winning time: 54.18 seconds

Medalists
gold medal	Jodie Henry	Australia
silver medal	Malia Metella	France
silver medal	Natalie Coughlin	United States

The Women's 100m Freestyle event at the 11th FINA World Aquatics Championships was swum 28 – 29 July 2005 in Montreal, Quebec, Canada. Preliminary heats and Semifinal heats were 28 July; the final was 29 July.

== Records ==
Prior to this competition, the existing world and competition records were as follows:

World record	Jodie Henry (AUS)	53.52	Athens, Greece	18 August 2004
Championship record	Le Jingyi (CHN)	54.01	Rome, Italy	5 September 1994

== Results ==
=== Preliminaries ===
Rank	Heat + Lane	Swimmer	Nation	Time	Notes
1	H9 L5	Amanda Weir	United States	54.49	q
2	H9 L4	Marleen Veldhuis	Netherlands	54.82	q
3	H11 L4	Jodie Henry	Australia	55.04	q
4	H10 L5	Malia Metella	France	55.11	q
5	H10 L6	Hanna-Maria Seppälä	Finland	55.25	q
6	H10 L3	Nery-Mantey Niangkouara	Greece	55.36	q
7	H11 L3	Federica Pellegrini	Italy	55.40	q
8	H11 L5	Natalie Coughlin	United States	55.45	q
9	H10 L4	Alice Mills	Australia	55.55	q
10	H10 L7	Therese Alshammar	Sweden	55.64	q
11	H10 L2	Solenne Figuès	France	55.82	q
12	H9 L3	Daniela Götz	Germany	55.88	q
13	H11 L6	Josefin Lillhage	Sweden	55.91	q
14	H9 L1	Jana Kolukanova	Estonia	55.95	q
15	H9 L2	YANG Yu	China	56.22	q
15	H9 L8	Alison Fitch	New Zealand	56.22	q
17	H8 L4	Norie Urabe	Japan	56.23	
18	H11 L7	Chantal Groot	Netherlands	56.24	
19	H11 L2	PANG Jiaying	China	56.30	
20	H11 L1	Sara Isakovič	Slovenia	56.31	
21	H11 L8	Jana Myskova	Czech Republic	56.41	
22	H8 L3	Petra Klosova	Czech Republic	56.42	
23	H7 L4	Anna Gostomelsky	Israel	56.43	
24	H7 L2	Vanessa García	Puerto Rico	56.96	
25	H8 L6	Hannah Wilson	Hong Kong	57.11	
26	H8 L8	Atsumi Yamada	Japan	57.22	
27	H9 L7	Jeanette Ottesen	Denmark	57.23	
28	H8 L1	Georgina Toomey	New Zealand	57.24	
29	H10 L8	Ionela Cozma	Romania	57.28	
30	H8 L5	Maryia Hanchar	Belarus	57.53	
31	H7 L3	Keo Ra Lee	South Korea	57.66	
32	H6 L4	Ragnheidur Ragnarsdottir	Iceland	57.69	
33	H7 L7	Annette Hansen	Denmark	57.73	
34	H6 L5	Na-Ri Park	South Korea	58.01	
34	H7 L6	Chin-Kuei Yang	Chinese Taipei	58.01	
36	H7 L1	Jiratida Phinyosophon	Thailand	58.12	
37	H8 L7	Pin-Chieh Nieh	Chinese Taipei	58.13	
38	H7 L8	Joscelin Yeo	Singapore	58.15	
39	H5 L4	Irina Shlemova	Uzbekistan	58.44	
40	H4 L8	Heather Brand	Zimbabwe	58.85	
41	H6 L6	Sarah Chahed	Tunisia	58.92	
42	H6 L2	Christine Mailliet	Luxembourg	59.14	
43	H4 L3	Pamela Benítez	El Salvador	59.27	
44	H4 L6	Anna Liza Mopio Jane	Papua New Guinea	59.40	
45	H6 L8	Shu Yong Ho	Singapore	59.48	
46	H5 L3	Alia Atkinson	Jamaica	59.61	
47	H5 L1	Yamile Bahamonde	Ecuador	59.70	
48	H6 L1	Khadija Ciss	Senegal	59.75	
49	H6 L7	Wing Yan Fung	Hong Kong	59.84	
50	H6 L3	Shikha Tandon	India	59.89	
51	H5 L2	Jasna Ovsenik	Slovenia	1:00.01	
52	H5 L8	Gisela Morales	Guatemala	1:00.19	
53	H3 L4	Jakie Wellman	Zambia	1:00.26	
54	H5 L7	Melissa Vincent	Mauritius	1:00.34	
55	H4 L4	Carolina Cerqueda	Andorra	1:00.56	
56	H3 L1	Samantha Fajardo	Ecuador	1:00.71	
57	H3 L5	Man Wai Fong	Macau	1:00.72	
58	H5 L6	Carolina Colorado Henao	Colombia	1:00.85	
59	H5 L5	Chonlathorn Vorathamrong	Thailand	1:01.07	
60	H4 L1	Alexis Jordan	Barbados	1:01.12	
61	H4 L7	Sharon Fajardo	Honduras	1:01.21	
62	H4 L5	Kiera Aitken	Bermuda	1:01.66	
63	H3 L3	Ashley Aitken	Bermuda	1:01.76	
64	H3 L2	Davina Mangion	Malta	1:02.67	
65	H3 L7	Jonay Briedenhann	Namibia	1:03.66	
66	H3 L8	Katerine Moreno	Bolivia	1:04.21	
67	H2 L6	Mbolatiana Ramanisa	Madagascar	1:04.67	
68	H3 L6	Mireille Hakimeh	Syria	1:05.03	
69	H2 L4	Heba Bashouti	Jordan	1:05.38	
70	H2 L2	Jessica Vieira	Mozambique	1:05.75	
71	H2 L3	Sussie Pineda	Honduras	1:06.10	
72	H1 L7	Rubab Raza	Pakistan	1:06.52	
73	H2 L5	Kiran Khan	Pakistan	1:06.53	
74	H4 L2	Phan Thi Hanh	Vietnam	1:06.97	
75	H2 L8	Aya Nakitanda	Uganda	1:07.76	
76	H2 L7	Sameera Al Bitar	Bahrain	1:08.05	
77	H2 L1	Aminath Rouya	Maldives	1:08.58	
78	H1 L5	Debra Daniel	Federated States of Micronesia	1:11.03	
79	H1 L4	Oshin Bharati	Nepal	1:14.40	
-	H1 L2	Lasm Quissoh Genevieve Meledje	Ivory Coast	DNS	
-	H1 L3	Anifath F. M. Okanla	Benin	DNS	
-	H1 L6	Eliane Droubry Dohi	Ivory Coast	DNS	
-	H7 L5	Audrey Lacroix	Canada	DNS	
-	H8 L2	Sophie Simard	Canada	DNS	
-	H9 L6	Martina Moravcová	Slovakia	DNS	
-	H10 L1	Paulina Barzycka	Poland	DNS	

=== Semifinals ===
Rank	Heat + Lane	Swimmer	Nation	Time	Notes
1	S2 L5	Jodie Henry	Australia	54.52	q
2	S1 L4	Marleen Veldhuis	Netherlands	54.54	q
3	S2 L4	Amanda Weir	(United States) USA	54.61	q
4	S1 L6	Natalie Coughlin	(United States) USA	54.65	q
5	S1 L5	Malia Metella	France	54.93	q
6	S2 L7	Daniela Götz	Germany	54.98	q
7	S1 L3	Nery-Mantey Niangkouara	Greece	55.07	q
8	S2 L2	Alice Mills	Australia	55.13	q
9	S2 L3	Hanna-Maria Seppälä	Finland	55.32	
10	S2 L6	Federica Pellegrini	Italy	55.37	
11	S1 L7	Josefin Lillhage	Sweden	55.61	
12	S1 L2	Therese Alshammar	Sweden	55.64	
13	S1 L8	Chantal Groot	Netherlands	55.78	
14	S2 L1	Jana Kolukanova	Estonia	55.81	NR
15	S1 L1	Alison Fitch	New Zealand	56.22	
16	S2 L8	Norie Urabe	Japan	56.53	

=== Final ===
Rank	Name	Nationality	Time	Notes
1st place, gold medalist(s)	Jodie Henry	Australia	54.18	
2nd place, silver medalist(s)	Malia Metella	France	54.74	
2nd place, silver medalist(s)	Natalie Coughlin	(United States) USA	54.74	
4	Amanda Weir	(United States) USA	54.77	
5	Marleen Veldhuis	Netherlands	54.90	
6	Alice Mills	Australia	54.92	
7	Nery-Mantey Niangkouara	Greece	54.93	
8	Daniela Gotz	Germany	55.27	
