= Alexey Khovrin =

Kazakhstani swimmer (born 1973)

Personal information
- Born: June 10, 1973 (age 53)

Sport
- Sport: Swimming
Medal record
Representing Kazakhstan
Asian Games
Gold medal – first place	1994 Hiroshima	50m freestyle
Silver medal – second place	1994 Hiroshima	4x100m freestyle relay

Aleksey Khovrin (Russian: Алексей Ховрин; born June 10, 1973) is a retired male freestyle swimmer from Kazakhstan. He competed at the 1996 Summer Olympics in Atlanta, Georgia, where he was disqualified with the Men's 4 × 100 m Freestyle Relay Team, alongside Sergey Borisenko, Sergey Ushkalov, and Aleksey Yegorov.

== Achievements ==
- Master of Sport of International Class
- Master of Sport of USSR
- Champion of Asian Games 1994
- Champion of Kazakhstan
- World Cup Silver Medal Holder
- 1996 Champion of USSR 1986
- 2006 CIS Games Silver and Bronze Medal Holder
- Kazakhstan National Swimming Team.
- 2010 Champion of Russian in Masters Swimming
- Masters Swimming Russia records holder
- H2O Club Doha autumn cup champion

Interview with Alexey on 28 May 2008

BC Masters Swimming Record Holder 50 fly , 50 back https://msabc.ca/wp/wp-content/uploads/2023/08/BC-Men-LC.pdf
