= Theekshana =

Theekshana is both a given name and a surname. Notable people with the name include:

- Theekshana Ratnasekera (born 1982), Sri Lankan swimmer
- Avindu Theekshana (born 1998), Sri Lankan cricketer
- Maheesh Theekshana (born 2000), Sri Lankan cricketer
