= Sherri Henry =

Saint Lucian swimmer (born 1982)

Personal information
- Full name: Sherri Malaika Ayesha Henry
- National team: Saint Lucia
- Born: 12 April 1982 (age 44) Castries, Saint Lucia
- Height: 1.65 m (5 ft 5 in)
- Weight: 56 kg (123 lb)

Sport
- Sport: Swimming
- Strokes: Freestyle

Sherri Malaika Ayesha Henry (born April 12, 1982 in Castries) is a retired Saint Lucian swimmer, who specialized in sprint freestyle events. Henry became one of the first ever swimmers alongside Jamie Peterkin to represent Saint Lucia at the 2000 Summer Olympics.

Henry competed only in the women's 50 m freestyle at the 2000 Summer Olympics in Sydney. She received a ticket from FINA, under a Universality program, in an entry time of 29.99. She challenged seven other swimmers in heat three, including Nigeria's top favorite Ngozi Monu and Aruba's 15-year-old teen Roshendra Vrolijk. She posted a lifetime best and a Saint Lucian record of 28.81 to scorch the field with a quick pace for the fourth seed. Henry failed to advance into the semifinals, as she placed sixtieth overall out of 74 swimmers in the prelims.
