= Ratnasekera =

Ratnasekera is a surname. Notable people with the surname include:

- Jayantha Lal Ratnasekera (born 1962), Sri Lankan academic
- Theekshana Ratnasekera (born 1982), Sri Lankan swimmer
