= Alisa Khaleyeva =

Azerbaijani swimmer

Personal information
- Full name: Alisa Yuzy Khaleyeva
- National team: Azerbaijan
- Born: 26 September 1978 (age 47) Baku, Azerbaijani SSR, Soviet Union
- Height: 1.58 m (5 ft 2 in)
- Weight: 48 kg (106 lb)

Sport
- Sport: Swimming
- Strokes: Freestyle

Alisa Yuzy Khaleyeva (Azerbaijani: Alisa Yuzy Xalıyeva; born September 26, 1978) is an Azerbaijani former swimmer, who specialized in sprint freestyle events. Khaleyeva competed for Azerbaijan in the women's 50 m freestyle at the 2000 Summer Olympics in Sydney. She received a ticket from FINA, under a Universality program, in an entry time of 28.00. She challenged seven other swimmers in heat three, including Nigeria's top favorite Ngozi Monu and Aruba's 15-year-old teen Roshendra Vrolijk. Entering the race with a fastest-seeded time, Khaleyeva scorched the field effortlessly with a powerful pace, but fell short to third seed in 28.79, almost six-tenths of a second (0.60) behind the leader Monu. Khaleyeva failed to advance into the semifinals, as she placed fifty-ninth overall out of 74 swimmers in the prelims.
