= Francilla Agar =

Dominican swimmer (born 1975)

Personal information
- Full name: Francilla Agar
- National team: Dominica
- Born: 14 January 1975 (age 51) Saint David Parish, Dominica
- Height: 1.70 m (5 ft 7 in)
- Weight: 55 kg (121 lb)

Sport
- Sport: Swimming
- Strokes: Freestyle

Francilla Agar (born January 14, 1975) is a Dominican former swimmer, who specialized in sprint freestyle events.

== Career ==
Agar competed for Dominica in the women's 50 m freestyle at the 2000 Summer Olympics in Sydney. She received a ticket from FINA, under a Universality program, in an entry time of 29.90. She challenged seven other swimmers in heat three, including Nigeria's top favorite Ngozi Monu and Aruba's 15-year-old teen Roshendra Vrolijk. She rounded out the field to last place in 32.22, more than two seconds below her entry standard. Agar failed to advance into the semifinals, as she placed sixty-eighth overall out of 74 swimmers in the prelims.

== Personal life ==
She is the sister of sprinter Steve Agar.

Agar, who has dual citizenship with Canada, is openly lesbian, and contrasts the openness for LGBT people in Canada, and Sydney, to her childhood home. She was first attracted to women in Dominica, but the conservative and island's small population (about 70,000) population made things tense for expressing her sexuality. "It's very hush, hush. You have to realize that everybody knows you in Dominica. I'm pretty well known back home. I actually choose sometimes not to go back home because it's kind of difficult."

Agar's daughter, Jasmine Schofield, competes for Dominica in sprint freestyle swimming events as well. She competed in the 50 metre freestyle at the 2024 Summer Olympics in Paris.
