= Tanya Anacleto =

Mozambican swimmer (1976–2003)

Personal information
- Full name: Tânia Anacleto Gregório
- Nationality: Mozambique
- Born: 1 May 1976 Beira, Mozambique
- Died: 9 February 2003 (aged 26) Maputo, Mozambique
- Height: 1.65 m (5 ft 5 in)
- Weight: 59 kg (130 lb)

Sport
- Sport: Swimming
- Strokes: Freestyle

Tânia Anacleto Gregório (also known as Tanya Anacleto, 1 May 1976 – 9 February 2003) was a Mozambican former swimmer, who specialized in sprint freestyle events. She represented Mozambique at the 2000 Summer Olympics, and also held numerous national records in a sprint freestyle double (both 50 and 100 m).

Anacleto competed only in the women's 50 m freestyle at the 2000 Summer Olympics in Sydney. She received a ticket from FINA, under a Universality program, in an entry time of 29.48. She challenged seven other swimmers in heat three, including Nigeria's top favorite Ngozi Monu and Aruba's 15-year-old teen Roshendra Vrolijk. Diving in with a fastest reaction of 0.64 seconds, Anacleto scorched the field effortlessly to hit the wall with a second-fastest time and a Mozambican record of 28.78. Anacleto failed to advance into the semifinals, as she was placed 58th overall out of 74 swimmers in the prelims.

On 9 February 2003 Anacleto and her husband Reginaldo Correia were killed instantly in a road accident after their car crashed into the tree in the Mozambican countryside.
