= Noor Haki =

Iraqi swimmer

Personal information
- Full name: Noor Basil Haki
- National team: Iraq
- Born: 31 March 1979 (age 47) Baghdad, Iraq
- Height: 1.64 m (5 ft 5 in)
- Weight: 60 kg (132 lb)

Sport
- Sport: Swimming
- Strokes: Freestyle

Noor Basil Haki (Arabic: نور باسل حقي; born March 31, 1979) is an Iraqi former swimmer, who specialized in sprint freestyle events. She was the first woman to represent Iraq at the Olympics.

Haki competed for Iraq in the women's 50 m freestyle at the 2000 Summer Olympics in Sydney. She received a ticket from FINA, under a Universality program, in an entry time of 30.15. She challenged six other swimmers in heat two, including Cambodia's two-time Olympian Hem Raksmey and Maldives' 13-year-old Fariha Fathimath. Entering the race with a fastest-seeded time, she faded down the stretch to pick up a last seed in 35.51, more than five seconds below her entry standard. Haki failed to advance into the semifinals, as she placed seventy-first overall in the prelims.

== See also ==
- Women's sport in Iraq
