= Yukihiro Matsushita =

Japanese swimmer (born 1973)

Personal information
- Full name: Yukihiro Matsushita
- Nationality: Japan
- Born: 5 June 1973 (age 53) Hyogo, Japan
- Height: 1.79 m (5 ft 10 in)
- Weight: 80 kg (180 lb)

Sport
- Sport: Swimming
- Strokes: Freestyle, Butterfly
- College team: Chuo University
Medal record
Men's swimming
Representing Japan
Pan Pacific Championships
Bronze medal – third place	1995 Atlanta	4x100 m medley
Asian Games
Gold medal – first place	1994 Hiroshima	100 m freestyle
Gold medal – first place	1994 Hiroshima	4x100 m freestyle
Gold medal – first place	1994 Hiroshima	4x100m medley

Yukihiro Matsushita (松下 幸広, Matsushita Yukihiro; born 5 June 1973) is a Japanese former swimmer who competed at the 1996 Summer Olympics.

Matsushita graduated from Ichikawa High School in Hyōgo Prefecture, Japan, and was a member of the school's swim team.

Matsushita won the gold medal in the 100 metre freestyle at the 1994 Asian Games in Hiroshima, Japan. He was also a member of the 4 x 100 and 4 x 200 metres freestyle relay teams at the same Games.

At the 1996 Olympics in Atlanta, Georgia, United States, Matshuita competed in the men's 50 metre freestyle and men's 100 metre butterfly. Matsushita finished 35th in the freestyle, with a time of 23.60 seconds, and 20th in the butterfly, with a time of 54.50 seconds.
