= Hajime Itoi =

Japanese swimmer (born 1971)

Personal information
- Full name: Hajime Itoi
- Nationality: Japan
- Born: June 22, 1971 (age 55) Gifu, Japan
- Height: 1.81 m (5 ft 11 in)
- Weight: 70 kg (154 lb)

Sport
- Sport: Swimming
- Strokes: Backstroke, butterfly
- College team: Waseda University
Medal record
Men's swimming
Representing Japan
Pan Pacific Championships
| Bronze medal – third place | 1991 Edmonton | 200 m backstroke |
| Bronze medal – third place | 1993 Kobe | 100 m backstroke |
| Bronze medal – third place | 1993 Kobe | 200 m backstroke |
| Bronze medal – third place | 1993 Kobe | 4x100 m medley |
| Bronze medal – third place | 1995 Atlanta | 4x100 m medley |
Asian Games
| Gold medal – first place | 1994 Hiroshima | 100 m backstroke |
| Gold medal – first place | 1994 Hiroshima | 4x100 m medley |
| Silver medal – second place | 1990 Beijing | 100 m backstroke |
| Silver medal – second place | 1994 Hiroshima | 200 m backstroke |
| Silver medal – second place | 1994 Hiroshima | 100 m butterfly |
| Bronze medal – third place | 1990 Beijing | 200 m backstroke |
Summer Universiade
| Silver medal – second place | 1995 Fukuoka | 100m Backstroke |

Hajime Itoi (糸井 統, Itoi Hajime) (born June 22, 1971, in Gifu) is a retired Olympic backstroke swimmer from Japan. He represented his native country at two consecutive Summer Olympics, starting in 1992. He is best known for winning a silver medal at the 1995 Summer Universiade in Fukuoka. He competed for the Waseda University.
