= Bang Seung-hoon =

South Korean swimmer (born 1975)

Personal information
- Born: 15 December 1975 (age 50)

Sport
- Sport: Swimming
Medal record
Representing South Korea
Asian Games
| Gold medal – first place | 1994 Hiroshima | 400m freestyle |
| Silver medal – second place | 1994 Hiroshima | 4x200m freestyle relay |

Bang Seung-hoon (born 15 December 1975) is a South Korean freestyle swimmer. He competed in two events at the 1992 Summer Olympics.
