= Yuliana Mikheeva =

Armenian swimmer

Personal information
- Full name: Yuliana Mikheeva
- Nationality: Armenia
- Born: December 6, 1977 (age 48) Yerevan, Armenian SSR, Soviet Union

Sport
- Sport: Swimming
- Strokes: Freestyle
Medal record
Women's Swimming
Representing Armenia

Yuliana Mikheeva (Armenian: Յուլիանա Միխէևա, born December 6, 1977, in Yerevan, Armenian SSR) is an Armenian retired swimmer. She competed at the 2000 Summer Olympics in the women's 50 metre freestyle.
