= Wang Yiwu =

Chinese swimmer (born 1975)

Personal information
- Born: August 21, 1975 (age 50)

Sport
- Sport: Swimming
- Strokes: Breaststroke
Medal record
Representing China
World Championships (SC)
Gold medal – first place	1995 Rio de Janeiro	200m breaststroke
Asian Games
Gold medal – first place	1994 Hiroshima	200m breaststroke
Silver medal – second place	1994 Hiroshima	100m breaststroke
Silver medal – second place	1994 Hiroshima	4x100m medley relay

Wang Yiwu (born 21 August 1975) is a Chinese former swimmer who competed in the 1996 Summer Olympics.
