= Swimming at the 1994 Asian Games =

- Venue: Big Wave Pool
- Dates: 3–8 October 1994

Swimming was contested at the 1994 Asian Games in Hiroshima Big Wave Pool, Hiroshima, Japan from October 3 to October 8, 1994.

== Medalists ==
=== Men ===
| Event | Gold | | Silver | | Bronze | |
|---|---|---|---|---|---|---|
| 50 m freestyle | Alexey Khovrin; Kazakhstan | 23.12 | Jiang Chengji; China | 23.24 | Sergey Borisenko; Kazakhstan | 23.25 |
| 100 m freestyle | Yukihiro Matsushita; Japan | 51.09 | Sergey Borisenko; Kazakhstan | 51.26 | Alexey Yegorov; Kazakhstan | 51.28 |
| 200 m freestyle | Taihei Maeda; Japan | 1:51.08; GR | Kazunori Hikida; Japan | 1:52.75 | Woo Won-ki; South Korea | 1:52.80 |
| 400 m freestyle | Bang Seung-hoon; South Korea | 3:54.72; GR | Hisham Al-Masri; Syria | 3:55.86 | Masayuki Fujimoto; Japan | 3:56.16 |
| 1500 m freestyle | Hisham Al-Masri; Syria | 15:29.70; GR | Masato Hirano; Japan | 15:31.91 | Fu Tao; China | 15:34.46 |
| 100 m backstroke | Hajime Itoi; Japan | 56.08; GR | Eiji Komine; Japan | 56.45 | Lin Laijiu; China | 57.04 |
| 200 m backstroke | Ji Sang-jun; South Korea | 2:00.65; GR | Hajime Itoi; Japan | 2:01.34 | Ryuji Horii; Japan | 2:01.66 |
| 100 m breaststroke | Akira Hayashi; Japan | 1:02.04; GR | Wang Yiwu; China | 1:03.42 | Chen Jianhong; China | 1:03.94 |
| 200 m breaststroke | Wang Yiwu; China | 2:14.56; GR | Akira Hayashi; Japan | 2:14.91 | Ratapong Sirisanont; Thailand | 2:16.52 |
| 100 m butterfly | Jiang Chengji; China | 53.97; GR | Hajime Itoi; Japan | 54.27 | Mitsuharu Takane; Japan | 55.05 |
| 200 m butterfly | Xue Wei; China | 2:01.47 | Mitsuharu Takane; Japan | 2:01.64 | Osamu Mihara; Japan | 2:01.70 |
| 200 m individual medley | Ratapong Sirisanont; Thailand | 2:04.16; GR | Takahiro Fujimoto; Japan | 2:05.77 | Tatsuya Kinugasa; Japan | 2:06.19 |
| 400 m individual medley | Ratapong Sirisanont; Thailand | 4:20.03; GR | Tatsuya Kinugasa; Japan | 4:29.85 | Takahiro Fujimoto; Japan | 4:30.53 |
| 4 × 100 m freestyle relay | Japan; Hiroshi Fukuda; Makio Endo; Masakatsu Usami; Yukihiro Matsushita | 3:23.80; GR | Kazakhstan; Alexey Khovrin; Alexey Yegorov; Sergey Ushkalov; Sergey Borisenko | 3:25.12 | Uzbekistan; Oleg Tsvetkovskiy; Vyacheslav Kabanov; Oleg Pukhnatiy; Aleksandr Agafonov | 3:28.58 |
| 4 × 200 m freestyle relay | Japan; Taihei Maeda; Yukihiro Matsushita; Masayuki Fujimoto; Kazunori Hikida | 7:27.18; GR | South Korea; Ji Sang-jun; Woo Chul; Woo Won-ki; Bang Seung-hoon | 7:33.61 | Thailand; Vicha Ratanachote; Dulyarit Phuangthong; Pawin Kohvathana; Torlarp Sethsothorn | 7:39.76 |
| 4 × 100 m medley relay | Japan; Eiji Komine; Akira Hayashi; Hajime Itoi; Yukihiro Matsushita | 3:41.70; GR | China; Lin Laijiu; Wang Yiwu; Jiang Chengji; Qiu Jieming | 3:45.28 | Kazakhstan; Sergey Ushkalov; Alexandr Savitskiy; Andrey Gavrilov; Sergey Borisenko | 3:47.35 |

=== Women ===
| Event | Gold | | Silver | | Bronze | |
|---|---|---|---|---|---|---|
| 50 m freestyle | Naoko Imoto; Japan | 26.29; GR | Sumika Minamoto; Japan | 26.59 | Robyn Lamsam; Hong Kong | 26.95 |
| 100 m freestyle | Shan Ying; China | 54.40; GR | Naoko Imoto; Japan | 56.67 | Sumika Minamoto; Japan | 56.68 |
| 200 m freestyle | Le Ying; China | 1:59.77; GR | Eri Yamanoi; Japan | 2:00.30 | Suzu Chiba; Japan | 2:00.33 |
| 400 m freestyle | Suzu Chiba; Japan | 4:15.64 | Sachiko Miyaji; Japan | 4:15.82 | Jeong Won-kyung; South Korea | 4:22.16 |
| 800 m freestyle | Luo Ping; China | 8:31.57; GR | Tomoko Goza; Japan | 8:43.73 | Sachiko Miyaji; Japan | 8:48.29 |
| 100 m backstroke | He Cihong; China | 1:00.71; GR | Miki Nakao; Japan | 1:03.12 | Mai Nakamura; Japan | 1:03.16 |
| 200 m backstroke | He Cihong; China | 2:09.46; GR | Liu Bichun; China | 2:13.46 | Miki Nakao; Japan | 2:14.42 |
| 100 m breaststroke | Dai Guohong; China | 1:09.87; GR | Masami Tanaka; Japan | 1:10.96 | Hitomi Maehara; Japan | 1:11.54 |
| 200 m breaststroke | Yuan Yuan; China | 2:28.34; GR | Dai Guohong; China | 2:29.72 | Masami Tanaka; Japan | 2:31.10 |
| 100 m butterfly | Liu Limin; China | 58.38; GR | Qu Yun; China | 58.70 | Joscelin Yeo; Singapore | 1:01.62 |
| 200 m butterfly | Liu Limin; China | 2:06.77; GR | Hong Shu; China | 2:10.25 | Mika Haruna; Japan | 2:10.30 |
| 200 m individual medley | Dai Guohong; China | 2:15.42 | Hitomi Maehara; Japan | 2:15.73 | Hideko Hiranaka; Japan | 2:18.78 |
| 400 m individual medley | Lin Li; China | 4:40.47 | Dai Guohong; China | 4:45.64 | Hitomi Maehara; Japan | 4:46.42 |
| 4 × 100 m freestyle relay | Japan; Sumika Minamoto; Naoko Imoto; Eri Yamanoi; Suzu Chiba | 3:46.41 | Hong Kong; Lau King Ting; Fenella Ng; Vivian Lee; Robyn Lamsam | 3:54.36 | South Korea; Lee Bo-eun; Bae Yun-kyung; Lee Jie-hyun; Jeong Won-kyung | 3:56.92 |
| 4 × 100 m medley relay | China; He Cihong; Dai Guohong; Liu Limin; Shan Ying | 4:07.69; GR | Japan; Miki Nakao; Masami Tanaka; Mika Haruna; Suzu Chiba | 4:10.87 | South Korea; Lee Ji-hyun; Byun Ju-mee; Lee Dong-sook; Lee Bo-eun | 4:22.11 |

== Medal table ==
| Rank | Nation | Gold | Silver | Bronze | Total |
|---|---|---|---|---|---|
| 1 | China (CHN) | 15 | 8 | 3 | 26 |
| 2 | Japan (JPN) | 10 | 18 | 16 | 44 |
| 3 | South Korea (KOR) | 2 | 1 | 4 | 7 |
| 4 | Thailand (THA) | 2 | 0 | 2 | 4 |
| 5 | Kazakhstan (KAZ) | 1 | 2 | 3 | 6 |
| 6 | Syria (SYR) | 1 | 1 | 0 | 2 |
| 7 | Hong Kong (HKG) | 0 | 1 | 1 | 2 |
| 8 | Singapore (SIN) | 0 | 0 | 1 | 1 |
| 8 | Uzbekistan (UZB) | 0 | 0 | 1 | 1 |
| Totals (9 entries) | | 31 | 31 | 31 | 93 |
