= Chiang Tzu-ying =

Taiwanese swimmer (born 1984)

Personal information
- Full name: Chiang Tzu-ying
- National team: Chinese Taipei
- Born: 15 September 1984 (age 41) Taipei, Taiwan
- Height: 1.67 m (5 ft 6 in)
- Weight: 51 kg (112 lb)

Sport
- Sport: Swimming
- Strokes: Freestyle
Medal record
Representing Chinese Taipei
Asian Games
Bronze medal – third place	1998 Bangkok	4x100m freestyle relay
Bronze medal – third place	1998 Bangkok	4x200m freestyle relay

Chiang Tzu-ying (Chinese: 江 姿穎; pinyin: Jiāng Zīyǐng; born September 15, 1984) is a Taiwanese former swimmer, who specialized in sprint freestyle events. Chiang competed for Chinese Taipei in the women's 50 m freestyle, as a 15-year-old, at the 2000 Summer Olympics in Sydney. She achieved a FINA B-cut of 27.03 from the National University Games in Taipei. She challenged seven other swimmers in heat five, including teenagers Marijana Šurković of Croatia and Jūratė Ladavičiūtė of Lithuania. She scorched the field by more than half a second (0.50) to power home with a leading finish in a sterling time of 26.84, sufficiently enough for her personal best. Chiang failed to advance into the semifinals, as she placed fortieth overall out of 74 swimmers in the prelims.
