= Women's sport in Iraq =

Women's sport in Iraq has a long history, with many sports being played. Football (soccer) is among the most popular sport and hobby in Iraq. Many also participate in, but are not limited to, basketball, volleyball, tennis, taekwondo, and weightlifting. It is often seen as taboo when women involve in sports and other recreations as it is seen as inappropriate by the large conservative culture, yet in the Kurdistan region as well as the more urban cities of Iraq, such as Baghdad or Basra, society has become more accepting and supportive over time. Women are encouraged to dress and behave modestly, so the involvement of women in sports and the wearing of sports uniforms have been widely seen as taboo. Even with the growing support of women in sports, societal expectations still lead many women to play in secret or avoid sports altogether, which makes it harder for women to get involved in professional sports. Iraq was, at one point, a hub for athletics in the Middle East, but during Saddam Hussein's reign, involvement in sports declined. Sports in Iraq have faced many challenges over the past years, and only recently have sports committees and athletes, both men and women alike, begun to rebuild teams and strengthen involvement. Even then, the Ministry of Youth and Sports are often responsible for sponsoring sports teams and athletes, but they often lack the financial means to fully support them. The country's unstable history of dictatorship and war, as well as the growing trend of conservatism, have been recognized as reasons for weak, lacking, and in some cases nonactive and even nonexistent women's sports teams.

== History ==
Sports in Iraq, prior to the Ba'ath regime, which held power from 1968 to 2003, and Saddam Hussein's reign which lasted from 1979, when he took power, to 2003, when he lost power, were active and even home to many strong sports teams in the Middle East. Due to the Ba'ath regime's views, sports activity was not as supported as by past leaders. Under Saddam Hussein's reign, many athletes suffered torture, imprisonment, and murder. This was primarily directed and carried out by Saddam Hussein's oldest son, Uday Hussein. When athletes, teams, and coaches did not perform to Uday Hussein's expectations, they were punished. This led many athletes to flee Iraq. A long string of conflicts left Iraq in an unfit shape to focus on sports. Conflicts like the Iran-Iraq War (1980-1988), the Gulf War (1990-1991), the Bombing of Iraq (1998), and the Iraq War (2003-2011) are a few of the many conflicts that shifted focus away from sports.

== Notable athletes ==
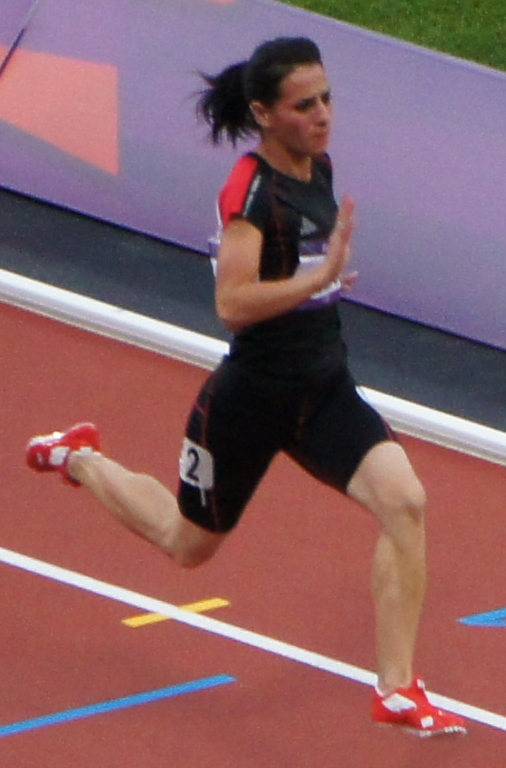
Dana Hussain competing in the 2012 Olympics.

=== Dana Hussain ===
Dana Hussain is an Iraqi sprinter and Olympic athlete. She was the only woman to be sent from Iraq to the 2008 Summer Olympics in Beijing, China. She got a 12.36 mark on the 100 meters in the Beijing Games. She won four medals in the 2011 Arab Games. A gold in the 400 meters, as well as a silver in the 100 meters. In the 2012 Summer Olympics, held in London, England, she got an 11.81 mark as well as an 11.91 mark on the 100 meters. Her personal best score for 100 meters was a 11.24 mark, which she accomplished in 2021. She also ran a 22.97 for a 200-meter race, making her the first Iraqi to go under 23 seconds.

== Olympic and Paralympic games ==
Olympic Games
Year	Number of women	Athlete(s) (sport)
2000 Summer Olympics	2	Maysa Hussain Matrood (5,000 metres, Athletics) Noor Haki (50 metres Freestyle, Swimming)
2004 Summer Olympics	1	Alaa Jassim (100 metres, Athletics)
2008 Summer Olympics	1	Dana Abdul Razak (100 metres, Athletics)
2012 Summer Olympics	3	Rand Al-Mashhadani (Archery) Dana Abdul Razak (100 metres, Athletics) Noor Amer (10 metres, Air Pistol)
2020 Summer Olympics	1	Fatimah Abbas (10 metres, Air Pistol)

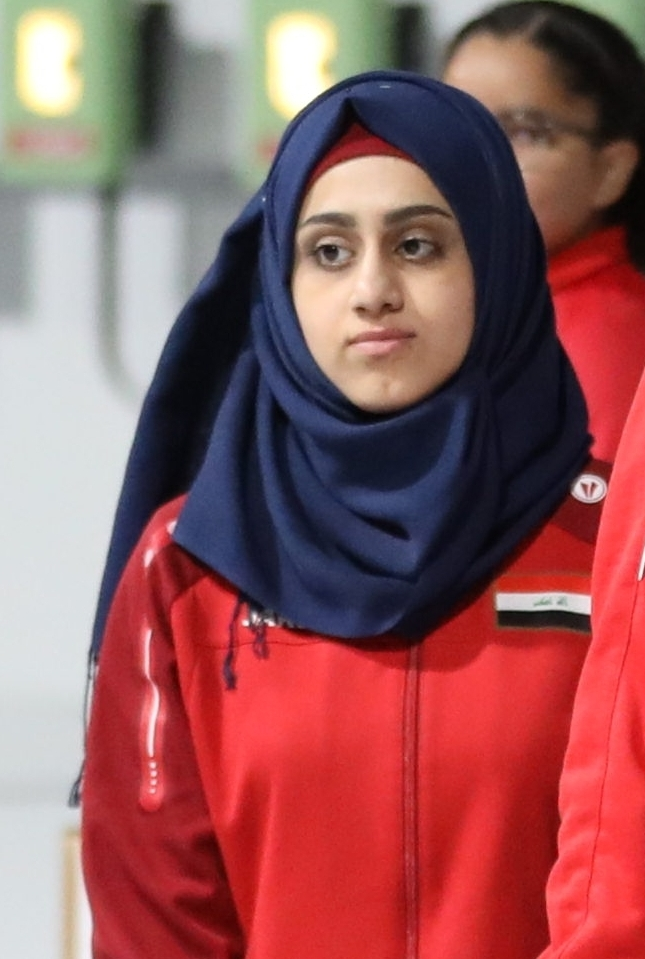
Fatimah Abbas at 2018 Youth Olympics.

Youth Olympic Games
Year	Number of women	Athlete(s) (sport)
2010 Summer Youth Olympics	1	Ema Hilwiyah (Sabre, Fencing)
2014 Summer Youth Olympics	1	Fatimah Saadi Al-Tameemi (Individual All Around, Artistic Gymnastics)
2018 Summer Youth Olympics	2	Fatimah Abbas (10 metres, Air Pistol)

== Sports ==
=== Football (soccer) ===
The Iraqi Women's Football League was founded in 2016 and is run by the Iraq Football Association. The Ghaz Al-Shamal club won the first women's title under the new league in 2016. The current winners of the Iraqi Women's Football League are Al-Quwa Al-Jawiya, who won all ten of their matches giving them the win in 2024. The Iraq women's team debuted their participation in the AFC Women's Asian Cup qualification in 2018. They played against the Jordan, Philippines, Bahrain, United Arab Emirates, and Tajikistan women's teams. They lost all 5 matches, only scoring 4 goals total, while being scored against 22 times. The Iraq women's team withdrew from the qualifier games for the 2022 AFC Women's Asian Cup. The Iraq women's national team is currently unranked in the FIFA Women's World Cup due to being inactive.

=== Futsal ===
The Iraqi Women's National Futsal team partook in the West Asian competition for the first time in June 2022. It was held in King Abdullah Sports City Hall in Jeddah, Saudi Arabia. The Iraqi women's team won the competition, with its final match being four to two, against the Saudi women's team.

=== Cycling ===
Iraqi female cyclists won two bronze and one silver medal in a tournament held in Algeria in September 2018. The team won a bronze medal in the relay race, as well as winning a bronze and silver medal in individual events.

=== Archery ===
Female members of the Iraqi Bow and Arrow team were among the 5 Iraqi medalists in the Cyprus International Bow and Arrow Championship in 2022. Rand Saad Mahmoud and Fatima Saad Mahmoud both won gold medals.
