= Duška Radan =

Montenegrin swimmer

Personal information
- Full name: Duška Radan
- National team: Yugoslavia
- Born: 11 May 1978 (age 48) Herceg Novi, SR Montenegro, SFR Yugoslavia
- Height: 1.75 m (5 ft 9 in)
- Weight: 61 kg (134 lb)

Sport
- Sport: Swimming
- Strokes: Freestyle
- Club: PKV Jadran
- Coach: Ivan Zuber

Duška Radan (Serbian: Душка Радан; born 11 May 1978) is a Montenegrin former swimmer, who specialized in sprint freestyle events. Originally from Montenegro, Radan represented the Federal Republic of Yugoslavia in two editions of the Olympic Games (1996 and 2000), and also played for PKV Jadran Herceg Novi under head coach Ivan Zuber.

Radan made her first Yugoslav team, as an 18-year-old at the 1996 Summer Olympics in Atlanta. There, she failed to reach the top 16 final in any of her individual events, finishing forty-fifth in the 50 m freestyle (27.62), and forty-sixth in the 100 m freestyle (1:00.34)

At the 2000 Summer Olympics in Sydney, Radan swam only in the 50 m freestyle. She achieved a FINA B-cut of 27.14 from the Akropolis Grand Prix in Athens. She challenged seven other swimmers in heat four, including Russian import Yekaterina Tochenaya of Kyrgyzstan, and Moldova's 16-year-old Maria Tregubova. Entering the race with a fastest-seeded time, Radan faded down the stretch to pick up a fourth spot in 27.70, almost a full second below the leading time set by Tochenaya. Radan failed to advance into the semifinals, as she placed fifty-third overall out of 74 swimmers in the prelims.
