= Jana Kolukanova =

Estonian swimmer

Personal information
- Full name: Jana Kolukanova
- National team: Estonia
- Born: 4 August 1981 (age 45) Tallinn, then part of Estonian SSR, Soviet Union
- Height: 1.84 m (6 ft 0 in)
- Weight: 65 kg (143 lb)

Sport
- Sport: Swimming
- Strokes: Freestyle
- Club: Kalevi Ujumiskool Tallinn
- College team: Auburn University (U.S.)
- Coach: Tiit-Urmas Reiter; David Marsh (U.S.)

Jana Kolukanova (born August 4, 1981) is a retired Estonian swimmer, who specialized in sprint freestyle events. She is a two-time Olympian, a multiple-time champion of Estonia, and one of the top European sprinters of her generation, having reached a world ranking as high as No. 8.

Kolukanova made her Olympic debut as a 19-year-old at the 2000 Summer Olympics in Sydney where she competed in the women's 50 m freestyle. She reached the semifinals by winning the swim-off against European champion Mette Jacobsen of Denmark and Ana Belén Palomo of Spain. She set new Estonian records in two consecutive swims: first in the prelims and then in the three-person swim-off a few hours later.

After her performances in Sydney, Kolukanova was heavily recruited by U.S. universities and decided to attend Auburn University in Alabama to swim for Auburn Tigers under head coach David Marsh. She studied psychology and graduated as a 19-time All-American, All-SEC selection, SEC Academic Honor Roll member as well as an Academic All-American. She also won 3 NCAA team championships while at Auburn and was teammates with current IOC President Kirsty Coventry of Zimbabwe.

Kolukanova qualified for the 2004 Summer Olympics in Athens at the European Championships in Madrid, Spain. In Athens she competed in the women's 100 m freestyle and challenged seven other swimmers in heat four, including her college teammate Eileen Coparropa of Panama. She finished behind Israel's Anna Gostomelsky and did not advance into the semifinals.

At the 2005 FINA World Championships in Montreal, Quebec, Canada, Kolukanova placed 8th in the 50 m freestyle, and 14th in the 100 m freestyle.

Kolukanova qualified for the 2008 Summer Olympics in Beijing, but did not compete due to injury.

Kolukanova was a regular participant on the FINA Swimming World Cup circuit throughout her career.

== See also ==
- List of Estonian records in swimming
