= Maria Tregubova =

Moldovan swimmer (born 1984)

Personal information
- Full name: Maria Tregubova
- National team: Moldova
- Born: 17 July 1984 (age 41) Chişinău, Moldavian SSR, Soviet Union
- Height: 1.70 m (5 ft 7 in)
- Weight: 65 kg (143 lb)

Sport
- Sport: Swimming
- Strokes: Freestyle
- Club: Olimpia Chişinău

Maria Tregubova (born July 17, 1984) is a Moldovan former swimmer, who specialized in sprint freestyle events. She is a two-time Olympian (2000 and 2004) and a member of the swimming team for Olimpia Chişinău.

Tregubova made her Olympic debut, as Moldova's youngest swimmer (aged 16), at the 2000 Summer Olympics in Sydney, where she competed in the women's 50 m freestyle. Swimming in heat four, she edged out Uzbekistan's Saida Iskandarova to pick up a fifth seed and fifty-fourth overall by 0.23 of a second in 27.75.

At the 2004 Summer Olympics in Athens, Tregubova qualified again for the 50 m freestyle by eclipsing a FINA B-cut of 26.90 from the Russian Open Championships in Moscow. Swimming in the same heat as Sydney, she picked up a second spot over Aruba's Roshendra Vrolijk by 0.03 of a second, outside her entry time of 28.40. Tregubova failed to advance into the semifinals, as she placed forty-eighth overall out of 75 swimmers on the last day of preliminaries.
