= Malia Metella =

French swimmer (born 1982)

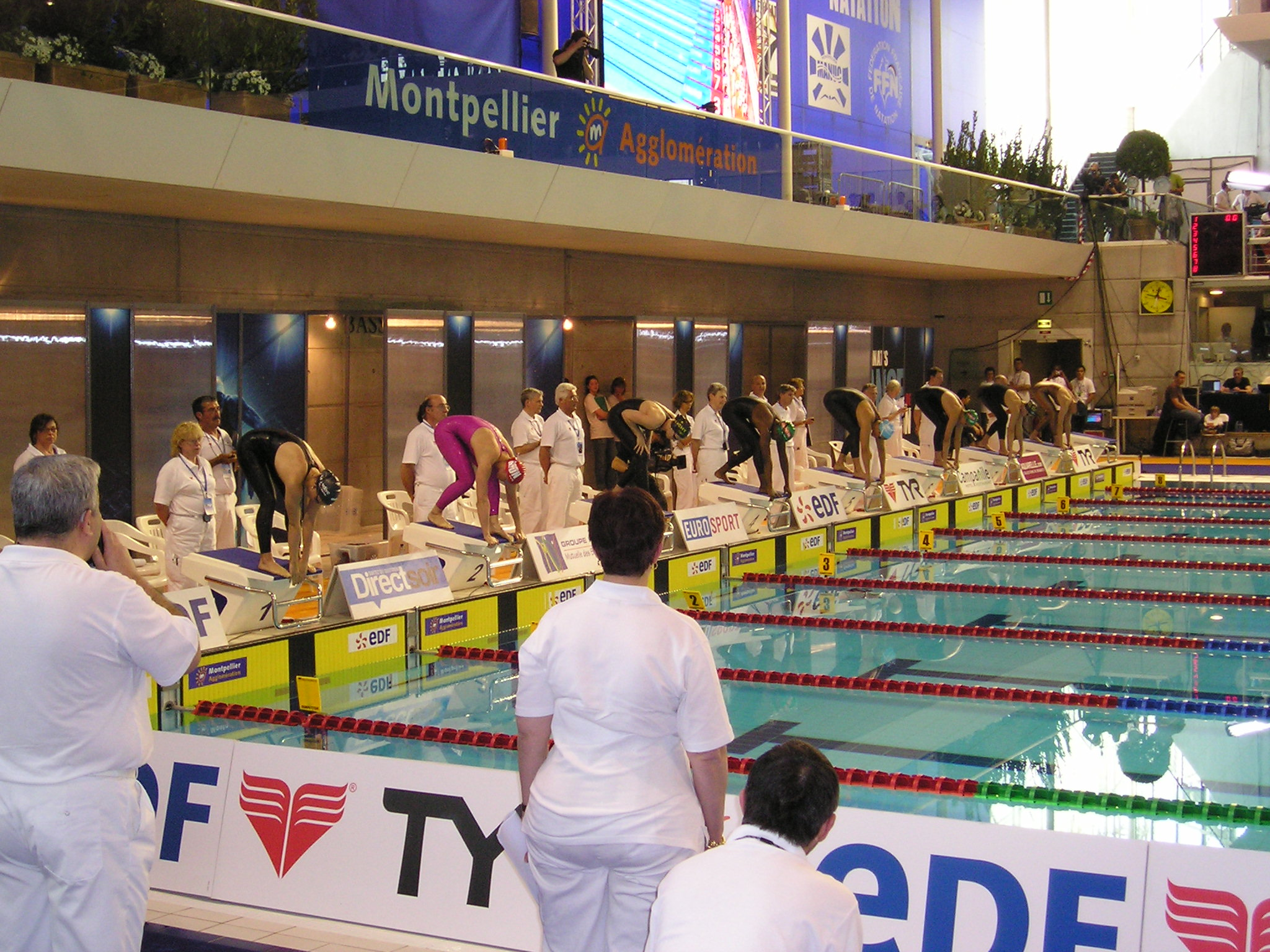
- Metella in lane 4 at the French swimming championships

Personal information
- Full name: Malia Metella
- Nationality: France
- Born: 23 February 1982 (age 44) Cayenne, French Guiana, France
- Height: 1.74 m (5 ft 9 in)

Sport
- Sport: Swimming
- Strokes: Butterfly, freestyle
Medal record
Olympic Games
Silver medal – second place	2004 Athens	50 m freestyle
World Championships (LC)
Silver medal – second place	2005 Montreal	100 m freestyle
World Championships (SC)
Silver medal – second place	2006 Shanghai	100 m freestyle
European Championships (LC)
Gold medal – first place	2004 Madrid	100 m freestyle
Gold medal – first place	2004 Madrid	4×100 freestyle
Gold medal – first place	2004 Madrid	4×100 medley
Silver medal – second place	2004 Madrid	100 m butterfly
Bronze medal – third place	2006 Budapest	4×100 m freestyle
European Championships (SC)
Gold medal – first place	2003 Dublin	100 m freestyle
Gold medal – first place	2004 Vienna	100 m freestyle
Bronze medal – third place	2003 Dublin	50 m freestyle
Bronze medal – third place	2004 Vienna	100 m butterfly
Bronze medal – third place	2007 Debrecen	4×50 m medley
Mediterranean Games
Gold medal – first place	2001 Tunis	100 m butterfly
Gold medal – first place	2009 Pescara	50 m freestyle
Silver medal – second place	2009 Pescara	4×100 m freestyle

Malia Metella (born 23 February 1982) is a French Olympic freestyle swimmer from French Guiana. She swam for France at the 2004 and 2008 Olympics, winning a silver medal in 2004 in the 50 metre freestyle. She won a silver medal in the 100 metre freestyle at the 2005 World Aquatics Championships.

== Swimming career ==
Metella began swimming at the age of four at the USLM Pacoussines-Cayenne club, as her mother was also a swimmer. Her younger brother Mehdy Metella is also a world-class swimmer. She left French Guiana when she turned 18 years old to compete for the Dauphins du TOEC club in Toulouse and train at the INSEP in Paris.

One year after moving to mainland France, Metella became the 2001 French champion in the 50 metre freestyle and the 100 metre butterfly. She was selected to compete at the 2001 Short Course European Championships and finished 21st in the heats in both events. She also won a gold medal at the 2001 Mediterranean Games. She successfully defended both of her national titles in 2002.

Metella won a gold medal at the 2003 European Short Course Championships in the 100 metre freestyle. The win was considered an "upset", and she came back from being in fourth place at the halfway point. She also won a bronze medal at the 50 metre freestyle. At the 2004 European Championships, she won gold medals in the 100 metre freestyle and a silver medal in the 100 metre butterfly. She also won gold medals with the French 4 × 100 metre freestyle and medley relays.

Metella represented France at the 2004 Summer Olympics and finished fourth in the 100 metre freestyle, only 0.10 seconds behind the bronze medalist. She went on to win the silver medal in the 50 metre freestyle, behind Inge de Bruijn. She also competed with the French 4 × 100 m freestyle relay that placed fifth. After the Olympic Games, she competed at the 2004 European Short Course Championships and won the gold medal in the 100 metre freestyle. She also won a bronze medal in the 100 metre butterfly.

Metella won a silver medal in the 100 metre freestyle at the 2005 World Aquatics Championships in a tie with Natalie Coughlin. She won a bronze medal with the 4 × 100 metre freestyle relay at the 2006 European Aquatics Championships but placed fourth in the 50 metre freestyle and did not advance into the 100 metre freestyle finals. She then won the silver medal in the 100 metre freestyle at the 2006 FINA World Championships. At the 2007 European Short Course Championships, she won a bronze medal in the 4 × 50 metre medley.

Metella represented France at the 2008 Summer Olympics in the 50 metre freestyle, where she finished 12th, and in the 100 metre freestyle, where she finished sixth. She announced her retirement from the sport on 3 November 2009, at the age of 27.

== Post-swimming career ==
In 2021, she swam across Lake Titicaca alongside French Paralympian Théo Curin. As of 2023, she works as a wealth manager at an insurance company.

Metella participated in the 2024 Summer Olympics torch relay during the leg in French Guiana. The same year, she joined other athletes in an opinion piece in L'Équipe advocating for voting against the far-right in the 2024 French legislative election.
