= Mbolatiana Ramanisa =

Malagasy swimmer

Personal information
- Full name: Mbolatiana Ramanisa
- National team: Madagascar
- Born: 20 May 1982 (age 44) Antananarivo, Madagascar
- Height: 1.68 m (5 ft 6 in)
- Weight: 55 kg (121 lb)

Sport
- Sport: Swimming
- Strokes: Freestyle

Mbolatiana Ramanisa (born May 20, 1982) is a Malagasy former swimmer, who specialized in sprint freestyle events. Ramanisa competed for Madagascar in the women's 50 meter freestyle at the 2000 Summer Olympics in Sydney. She received a ticket from FINA, under a Universality program, in an entry time of 28.54. She challenged seven other swimmers in heat three, including Nigeria's top favorite Ngozi Monu and Aruba's 15-year-old Roshendra Vrolijk. She faded down the stretch with enough quick pace to post a fifth-place time of 29.20, exactly a single second behind leader Monu. Ramanisa failed to advance into the semifinals, as she placed sixty-first overall out of 74 swimmers in the preliminary events.
