= Alfred Karl Alfredsson =

Icelandic sport shooter (born 1964)

Alfred Karl Alfredsson (born 21 October 1964) is an Icelandic sport shooter. He competed at the 2000 Summer Olympics in the men's skeet event, in which he tied for 47th place.
