= Sergey Ushkalov =

Kazakhstani swimmer

Personal information
- Born: February 2, 1972 (age 54)

Sport
- Sport: Swimming
- Strokes: Backstroke, freestyle
Medal record
Representing Kazakhstan
Asian Games
Silver medal – second place	1994 Hiroshima	4x100m freestyle relay
Bronze medal – third place	1994 Hiroshima	4x100m medley relay

Sergey Sergeyevich Ushkalov (Russian: Сергей Сергеевич Ушкалов; born February 2, 1972) is a retired male freestyle and backstroke swimmer from Kazakhstan. He competed at the 1996 Summer Olympics in Atlanta, Georgia. His best Olympic result was finishing in 15th place in the Men's 4 × 100 m Medley Relay event.
