= Sumika Minamoto =

Japanese swimmer (born 1979)

Personal information
- Full name: Sumika Minamoto
- Nationality: Japan
- Born: May 2, 1979 (age 47) Tokushima, Japan
- Height: 1.68 m (5 ft 6 in)
- Weight: 64 kg (141 lb)

Sport
- Sport: Swimming
- Strokes: Freestyle
Medal record
Women's swimming
Representing Japan
Olympic Games
Bronze medal – third place	2000 Sydney	4×100 m medley
World Championships (LC)
Bronze medal – third place	1998 Perth	4×100 m medley
World Championships (SC)
Gold medal – first place	1999 Hong Kong	4×100 m medley
Pan Pacific Championships
Bronze medal – third place	1995 Atlanta	50 m freestyle
Bronze medal – third place	1995 Atlanta	4×100 m freestyle
Bronze medal – third place	1997 Fukuoka	4×100 m medley
Asian Games
Gold medal – first place	1994 Hiroshima	4×100 m freestyle
Gold medal – first place	1998 Bangkok	4×100 m medley
Silver medal – second place	1994 Hiroshima	50 m freestyle
Silver medal – second place	1998 Bangkok	100 m freestyle
Bronze medal – third place	1994 Hiroshima	100 m freestyle
Bronze medal – third place	1998 Bangkok	50 m freestyle

Sumika Minamoto (源 純夏, Minamoto Sumika; born May 2, 1979 in Tokushima) is a former freestyle swimmer from Japan, who won the bronze medal in the 4 × 100 m Medley Relay at the 2000 Summer Olympics in Sydney, Australia. Her winning teammates in that race were Mai Nakamura, Junko Onishi, and Masami Tanaka. She competed in two consecutive Summer Olympics, starting in 1996.
