= Theekshana Ratnasekera =

Sri Lankan swimmer

Personal information
- Born: 1 July 1982 (age 44) Colombo, Sri Lanka
- Height: 1.65 m (5 ft 5 in)
- Weight: 55 kg (121 lb)

Sport
- Country: Sri Lanka
- Sport: Swimming
- Strokes: Freestyle
Medal record
Women's swimming
Representing Sri Lanka
South Asian Games
Bronze medal – third place	1999 Kathmandu	400 m freestyle

Theekshana Ratnasekera (born 1 July 1982) is a Sri Lankan former swimmer, who specialized in sprint freestyle events. She represented Sri Lanka, as an 18-year-old teen, at the 2000 Summer Olympics, and also held numerous age group and meet records in a sprint freestyle (both 50 and 100 m). Ratnasekera lost the race in the pre-Olympic selection to Radiesha Daluwatte, the teenage daughter of former Sri Lankan army commander Rohan Daluwatte, and the General filed a petition in the Court of Appeals to challenge the sports officials' decision to send Ratnasekera to the Olympics.

Ratnasekera competed only in the women's 50 m freestyle at the 2000 Summer Olympics in Sydney. She received a ticket from FINA, under a Universality program, in an entry time of 29.90. Swimming in heat two, she held off a sprint battle against six other swimmers to overhaul a 30-second barrier and hit the wall first in a sterling time and a Sri Lankan record of 29.88. Ratnasekera's effortless triumph was not enough to put her through to the semifinals, as she placed sixty-fourth overall in the prelims.
