= Võ Trần Trường An =

Vietnamese swimmer

Personal information
- Born: April 26, 1981 (age 45)

Sport
- Sport: Swimming

Võ Trần Trường An (born 26 April 1981) is a retired Vietnamese Olympic swimmer who competed at the 1996 Summer Olympics.

== Career ==
Võ finished 52nd out of 55 competitors in the women's 50m freestyle with a time of 29.02 seconds. She retired from swimming four years later.

== Personal life ==
Võ owned a shop at Ben Thanh Market.
