= Nishma Gurung =

Nepalese swimmer

Personal information
- Born: March 11, 1980 (age 46)

Sport
- Sport: Swimming

Nisma Gurung (born 11 March 1980) is a Nepalese freestyle swimmer who represented Nepal in the 1996 Summer Olympic Games. Gurung finished 55th out of 55 swimmers in the women's 50m freestyle with a time of 41.45 seconds.
