= Lee Bo-eun =

South Korean swimmer (born 1976)

Personal information
- Full name: Lee Bo-eun
- National team: South Korea
- Born: 25 December 1976 (age 49) Seoul, South Korea
- Height: 1.72 m (5 ft 8 in)
- Weight: 61 kg (134 lb)

Sport
- Sport: Swimming
- Strokes: Freestyle, butterfly
Medal record
Women's swimming
Representing South Korea
Asian Games
Bronze medal – third place	1994 Hiroshima	4×100 m medley
Bronze medal – third place	1998 Bangkok	4×100 m medley

Lee Bo-Eun (Korean: 이보은; born December 25, 1976) is a South Korean former swimmer, who specialized in freestyle and butterfly events. She represented South Korea in two editions of the Olympic Games (1996 and 2000), and also earned bronze medals in the medley relay at the Asian Games (1994 and 1998).

Lee made her Olympic debut at the 1996 Summer Olympics in Atlanta. She failed to reach the top 16 final in the 100 m freestyle, finishing only in thirty-fifth place at 58.27. A member of the South Korean team, she placed nineteenth in the 4×100 m freestyle relay (3:57.83), and eighteenth each in the 4×200 m freestyle relay (8:22.90) and in the 4×100 m medley relay (4:18.98).

At the 2000 Summer Olympics in Sydney, Lee drastically shortened her program on her second Olympic appearance, swimming only in two events. She achieved a FINA B-cut of 1:02.54 from the Asian Championships in Busan. On the first day of the Games, Lee placed thirty-fifth in the 100 m butterfly. Swimming in heat three, she powered past the field with an early lead at the first turn, but faded down the stretch to a fourth-place time and a lifetime best of 1:02.22. Lee also teamed up with Shim Min-Ji, Chang Hee-Jin, and Ku Hyo-Jin in the 4×100 m medley relay. Swimming the butterfly leg in heat two, Lee recorded a split of 1:03.15, but the South Koreans rounded out a six-team field to last place and seventeenth overall in a final time of 4:16.93.
