= Jūratė Ladavičiūtė =

Lithuanian swimmer (born 1985)

Personal information
- Born: February 19, 1985 (age 41)

Sport
- Sport: Swimming

Achievements and titles
- Olympic finals: 2000 Summer Olympics

Jūratė Ladavičiūtė (born 19 February 1985) is a female freestyle swimmer from Lithuania, and the youngest member (15 years, 207 days) of the national squad competing at the 2000 Summer Olympics in Sydney, Australia. As the only women she participated in the 50m and 100m Freestyle. In both events she didn't reach the final.
