= Marijana Šurković =

Croatian swimmer

Personal information
- Full name: Marijana Šurković
- Nationality: Croatia
- Born: 14 February 1984 (age 42) Dubrovnik

Sport
- Sport: Swimming
- Strokes: Freestyle

Marijana Šurković (born 14 February 1984 in Dubrovnik) is a retired female freestyle swimmer from Croatia, who competed for her native country at the 2000 Summer Olympics in Sydney, Australia. There she ended up in 46th place in the women's 50 meter freestyle event, clocking 27.32 in the qualifying heats.
