= Fariha Fathimath =

Maldivian swimmer

Personal information
- Full name: Fariha Fathimath
- National team: Maldives
- Born: 10 March 1987 (age 39)
- Height: 1.53 m (5 ft 0 in)
- Weight: 39 kg (86 lb)

Sport
- Sport: Swimming
- Strokes: Freestyle

Fariha Fathimath (born March 10, 1987) is a Maldivian former swimmer, who specialized in sprint freestyle events. Fathimath competed for the Maldives, as a 13-year-old, in the women's 50 m freestyle at the 2000 Summer Olympics in Sydney. She received a ticket from FINA, under a Universality program, in an entry time of 34.66. She challenged six other swimmers in heat two, including Cambodia's two-time Olympian Hem Raksmey. Braving against the deep waters of an Olympic-size pool, Fathimath fought off a sprint battle from Raksmey to grab a sixth seed in a new Maldivian record of 32.36 and cut off her entry standard by more than two seconds. Fathimath's best effort was not enough to put her through to the semifinals, as she placed sixty-ninth overall in the prelims.
