= Hem Raksmey =

Cambodian swimmer

Personal information
- Full name: Hem Raksmey
- National team: Cambodia
- Born: 6 September 1983 (age 42) Phnom Penh, Cambodia
- Height: 1.75 m (5 ft 9 in)
- Weight: 65 kg (143 lb)

Sport
- Sport: Swimming
- Strokes: Freestyle, breaststroke

Hem Raksmey (born September 6, 1983) is a Cambodian former swimmer, who specialized in sprint freestyle and breaststroke events. She represented Cambodia in two editions of the Olympic Games (1996 and 2000), and also held numerous age group records in all strokes (freestyle, backstroke, breaststroke, and butterfly). She also shared a sibling tandem together with her brother Hem Kiry, when they both competed at the 2000 Summer Olympics.

Hem made her Olympic debut, as Cambodia's youngest ever athlete and swimmer (aged 12), at the 1996 Summer Olympics in Atlanta. There, she failed to reach the top 16 final in the 100 m breaststroke, finishing last out of 46 swimmers in 1:44.68.

At the 2000 Summer Olympics in Sydney, Hem competed only in the 50 m freestyle. Invited to the Games as a wild card selection by FINA officials, she entered the race in her lifetime best of 34.78. She challenged six other swimmers in heat two, including Maldives' 13-year-old Fariha Fathimath. She scorched the field to a seventh seed in a Cambodian record of 33.11, edging Iraq's Noor Haki out to last place by 2.4 seconds. Hem failed to advance into the semifinals, as she placed seventieth overall in the prelims.
