= Ngozi Monu =

Nigerian swimmer (born 1981)

Personal information
- Full name: Ngozi Rosalin Monu
- Nationality: Nigeria
- Born: 7 January 1981 (age 45) Lagos, Nigeria
- Height: 5 ft 11 in (1.80 m)
- Weight: 154 lb (70 kg)

Sport
- Sport: Swimming
- Strokes: Freestyle
- Club: New York City Hydras (NYCH)

Ngozi Rosalin Monu (born 7 January 1981 in Lagos, Nigeria) is a Nigerian swimmer. Monu is the most prolific female swimmer from Nigeria. She focuses on the 50m & 100m freestyle event. Her inaugural Olympiads was at the 2000 Sidney Summer Olympics. She competed at the 2008 Summer Olympics. Uche Monu, her younger sister, is also a swimmer who represents Nigeria in the Backstroke and freestyle events.

== 2000 Summer Olympics ==
Monu's inaugural Olympiad was the 2000 Sidney Summer Olympics at the age of 19. She won her heat in the women's 50 metre freestyle with a time of 28.20s, but she was ranked 57th out of 92 medal competitors.

== 2007 World Aquatics championships ==
At the World Aquatics Championship in Melbourne, Australia, Monu participated in the 50m with a time of 28.89 ranked 83rd, 100m freestyle with a time of 1.01.88 ranked 84th. And also Anchored the Nigerian team in the 400m freestyle and medley relays.

== 2008 Summer Olympics ==
In Beijing Monu represented Nigeria for the second time participating in the same event. She finished 6th in her Heat with a time of 27.39 which was short of advancing to the next stage. However it is one of the fastest times by a Nigerian woman in the event.
