= Iran at the 2002 Asian Games =

- IOC code: IRI
- NOC: National Olympic Committee of the Islamic Republic of Iran

in Busan
- Competitors: 126 in 15 sports
- Flag bearer: Ali Daei
- Medals Ranked 10th: Gold 8 Silver 14 Bronze 14 Total 36

Asian Games appearances (overview)
- 1951; 1954; 1958; 1962; 1966; 1970; 1974; 1978; 1982; 1986; 1990; 1994; 1998; 2002; 2006; 2010; 2014; 2018; 2022; 2026

Iran participated in the 2002 Asian Games held in the city of Busan. This country is ranked 10th with 8 gold medals in this edition of the Asiad.

== Competitors ==
Sport	Men	Women	Total
Archery	1		1
Athletics	3	1	4
Canoeing	2	4	6
Cycling	9		9
Equestrian	3	1	4
Football	20		20
Judo	7		7
Karate	5		5
Shooting	3	4	7
Taekwondo	6	3	9
Volleyball	12		12
Water polo	13		13
Weightlifting	8		8
Wrestling	14		14
Wushu	7		7
Total	113	13	126

== Medal summary ==
=== Medals by sport ===
Sport	Gold	Silver	Bronze	Total
Athletics		1		1
Cycling track		1		1
Football	1			1
Judo	1	1	3	5
Karate	2	3		5
Shooting			1	1
Taekwondo	1	1	2	4
Volleyball		1		1
Weightlifting	1	3	3	7
Wrestling	1	2	5	8
Wushu	1	1		2
Total	8	14	14	36

=== Medalists ===
Medal	Name	Sport	Event
Gold	Ebrahim Mirzapour; Mehdi Amirabadi; Yahya Golmohammadi; Saeid Lotfi; Javad Nekounam; Iman Mobali; Javad Kazemian; Ali Daei; Alireza Vahedi Nikbakht; Mehdi Rahmati; Hossein Kaebi; Moharram Navidkia; Abolfazl Hajizadeh; Mohsen Bayatinia; Ali Badavi; Siavash Akbarpour; Jalal Kameli Mofrad; Mohammad Nosrati; Hamid Azizzadeh; Ershad Yousefi	Football	Men
Gold	Masoud Haji Akhondzadeh	Judo	Men's 60 kg
Gold	Alireza Katiraei	Karate	Men's kumite 70 kg
Gold	Mehran Behnamfar	Karate	Men's kumite +75 kg
Gold	Hadi Saei	Taekwondo	Men's 72 kg
Gold	Hossein Rezazadeh	Weightlifting	Men's +105 kg
Gold	Alireza Heidari	Wrestling	Men's freestyle 96 kg
Gold	Hossein Ojaghi	Wushu	Men's sanshou 70 kg
Silver	Abbas Samimi	Athletics	Men's discus throw
Silver	Hossein Askari; Alireza Haghi; Abbas Saeidi Tanha; Amir Zargari	Cycling track	Men's team pursuit
Silver	Mahmoud Miran	Judo	Men's +100 kg
Silver	Hossein Rouhani	Karate	Men's kumite 60 kg
Silver	Mehdi Amouzadeh	Karate	Men's kumite 65 kg
Silver	Jasem Vishkaei	Karate	Men's kumite 75 kg
Silver	Behzad Khodadad	Taekwondo	Men's 58 kg
Silver	Amir Hossein Monazzami; Amir Hosseini; Abbas Ghasemian; Peyman Akbari; Mohammad Mansouri; Ahsanollah Shirkavand; Mahmoud Afshardoust; Behnam Mahmoudi; Mohammad Torkashvand; Afshin Oliaei; Alireza Behboudi; Rahman Mohammadirad	Volleyball	Men
Silver	Mohammad Hossein Barkhah	Weightlifting	Men's 77 kg
Silver	Hadi Panzvan	Weightlifting	Men's 85 kg
Silver	Kourosh Bagheri	Weightlifting	Men's 94 kg
Silver	Alireza Dabir	Wrestling	Men's freestyle 66 kg
Silver	Abbas Jadidi	Wrestling	Men's freestyle 120 kg
Silver	Mohammad Aghaei	Wushu	Men's sanshou 65 kg
Bronze	Hamed Malekmohammadi	Judo	Men's 73 kg
Bronze	Abbas Fallah	Judo	Men's 100 kg
Bronze	Mahmoud Miran	Judo	Men's openweight
Bronze	Lida Fariman; Elham Hashemi; Raheleh Kheirollahzadeh	Shooting	Women's 10 m running target team
Bronze	Majid Aflaki	Taekwondo	Men's 78 kg
Bronze	Parvaneh Tehrani	Taekwondo	Women's 55 kg
Bronze	Mehdi Panzvan	Weightlifting	Men's 69 kg
Bronze	Mohammad Ali Falahatinejad	Weightlifting	Men's 77 kg
Bronze	Hossein Tavakkoli	Weightlifting	Men's 105 kg
Bronze	Mohammad Rezaei	Wrestling	Men's freestyle 55 kg
Bronze	Mehdi Hajizadeh	Wrestling	Men's freestyle 74 kg
Bronze	Parviz Zeidvand	Wrestling	Men's Greco-Roman 74 kg
Bronze	Masoud Hashemzadeh	Wrestling	Men's Greco-Roman 96 kg
Bronze	Alireza Gharibi	Wrestling	Men's Greco-Roman 120 kg

== Results by event ==
=== Aquatics ===
==== Water polo ====
Team	Event	Preliminary round			Semifinal	Final	Rank
Team	Event	Round 1	Round 2	Rank	Semifinal	Final	Rank
Iran	Men	Singapore; W 13–3	Kazakhstan; L 4–12	2 Q	Japan; L 9–12	3rd place match China; L 6–10	4
Roster: Alireza Shahidipour; Bahman Mouchehkiani; Alireza Amirian; Ahmad Nesaei; Majid Gholami; Vahid Rezaei; Ali Saleh; Saeid Mirmehdi; Kambiz Rakhshanimehr; Ali Akbar Shirijian; Hamed Dalil-Heirati; Mohsen Rezvani; Meisam Jafari; Coach: (Croatia) Ante Nakić

=== Archery ===
Athlete	Event	Ranking round		Round of 32	Round of 16	Quarterfinal	Semifinal	Final	Rank
Athlete	Event	Score	Rank	Round of 32	Round of 16	Quarterfinal	Semifinal	Final	Rank
Majid Mirrahimi	Men's individual	1288	21 Q	Nan (MYA); L 153–157	Did not advance				22

=== Athletics ===
Athlete	Event	Round 1		Final	Rank
Athlete	Event	Time	Rank	Time / Result	Rank
Mehdi Jelodarzadeh	Men's 800 m	1:49.13	4	Did not advance	10
Mehdi Jelodarzadeh	Men's 1500 m	—N/a		DNF	—
Sajjad Moradi	Men's 1500 m	—N/a		3:50.25	11
Abbas Samimi	Men's discus throw	—N/a		60.44 m	2nd place, silver medalist(s)
Parisa Behzadi	Women's shot put	—N/a		12.96 m	8

=== Canoeing ===
Athlete	Event	Heat		Semifinal		Final	Rank
Athlete	Event	Time	Rank	Time	Rank	Time	Rank
Babak Samari	Men's K1 1000 m	—N/a				3:52.752	5
Mohsen Milad; Babak Samari	Men's K2 500 m	—N/a				1:37.352	4
Sonia Nourizad	Women's K1 500 m	2:11.570	5 QS	2:11.044	2 Q	2:11.691	8
Hengameh Ahadpour; Farahnaz Amirshaghaghi	Women's K2 500 m	—N/a				2:02.822	6
Hengameh Ahadpour; Raheleh Ahadpour; Farahnaz Amirshaghaghi; Sonia Nourizad	Women's K4 500 m	—N/a				1:51.790	7

=== Cycling ===
==== Mountain bike ====
Athlete	Event	Time	Rank
Ahad Kazemi	Men's cross-country	Did not start	—
Ghader Mizbani	Men's cross-country	Did not start	—

==== Road ====
Athlete	Event	Time	Rank
Ahad Kazemi	Men's road race	4:26:54	17
Ghader Mizbani	Men's road race	4:24:19	7
Ghader Mizbani	Men's individual time trial	1:05:38.39	5

==== Track ====
Athlete	Event	Qualifying		Round 1		Final	Rank
Athlete	Event	Time	Rank	Time	Rank	Time / Score	Rank
Hassan Ali Varposhti	Men's 1 km time trial	—N/a				1.08.917	5
Hossein Askari	Men's individual pursuit	4.47.041	3 Q	Liu (TPE); W 4.47.053–DNS	3 QB	3rd place match Iijima (JPN); L 4.48.264–4.44.004	4
Abbas Saeidi Tanha	Men's points race	—N/a				26 pts	5
Moezeddin Seyed-Rezaei	Men's points race	—N/a				8 pts	9
Amir Zargari; Alireza Haghi	Men's madison	—N/a				9 pts	5
Hossein Askari; Alireza Haghi; Abbas Saeidi Tanha; Amir Zargari; Mehdi Sohrabi (heats)	Men's team pursuit	4.25.727	2 Q	Chinese Taipei; W 4.24.462–OVL	2 Q	China; L 4.23.108–4.20.753	2nd place, silver medalist(s)

=== Equestrian ===
Athlete	Event	Qualifier / Team final				Final			Jump-off		Rank
Athlete	Event	1st	2nd	Total	Rank	1st	2nd	Total	Pen.	Time	Rank
Arsia Ardalan on Canterbuliry	Individual jumping	0	16	16	22	Did not advance					24
Tara Ardalan on Air Ride	Individual jumping	0	4	4	6 Q	16	18	34	Not needed		13
Ali Nilforoushan on Herr Schroder	Individual jumping	4	4	8	14 Q	4	1	5	Not needed		5
Ramin Shakki on Revanche	Individual jumping	4	7	11	18 Q	0	8	8	Not needed		6
Tara Ardalan on Air Ride; Ali Nilforoushan on Herr Schroder; Ramin Shakki on Revanche; Arsia Ardalan on Canterbuliry	Team jumping	4	15	19	5	—N/a					

=== Football ===
Team	Event	Preliminary round				Quarterfinal	Semifinal	Final	Rank
Team	Event	Round 1	Round 2	Round 3	Rank	Quarterfinal	Semifinal	Final	Rank
Iran	Men	Afghanistan; W 10–0	Lebanon; W 2–0	Qatar; D 1–1	1 Q	Kuwait; W 1–0	South Korea; W 0–0 (5–3 P)	Japan; W 2–1	1st place, gold medalist(s)
Roster: Ebrahim Mirzapour; Mehdi Amirabadi; Yahya Golmohammadi; Saeid Lotfi; Javad Nekounam; Iman Mobali; Javad Kazemian; Ali Daei; Alireza Vahedi Nikbakht; Mehdi Rahmati; Hossein Kaebi; Moharram Navidkia; Abolfazl Hajizadeh; Mohsen Bayatinia; Ali Badavi; Siavash Akbarpour; Jalal Kameli Mofrad; Mohammad Nosrati; Hamid Azizzadeh; Ershad Yousefi; Coach: (Croatia) Branko Ivanković

=== Judo ===
Athlete	Event	Round of 32	Round of 16	Quarterfinal	Semifinal	Repechage	Final	Rank
Masoud Haji Akhondzadeh	Men's 60 kg	Bye	Shah (IND); W 1001–0000	Al-Dhafeeri (KUW); W 1001–0000	Jia (CHN); W 0200–0102	Bye	Donbay (KAZ); W 0200–0010	1st place, gold medalist(s)
Arash Miresmaeili	Men's 66 kg	Bye	Petryanin (UZB); W 0021–0010	Nurmuhammedow (TKM); L 0001–1011	Repechage; Singh (IND); W 0010–0001	Repechage; Smagulov (KGZ); L 1021–0010	Did not advance	7
Hamed Malekmohammadi	Men's 73 kg	—N/a	Lama (NEP); W 1000–0000	Choi (KOR); L 0000–0001	Repechage; Ramirez (PHI); W 1101–0000	Repechage; Shakharov (KAZ); W 0101–0001	3rd place match Pak (PRK); W 0011–0010	3rd place, bronze medalist(s)
Kazem Sarikhani	Men's 81 kg	—N/a	Zhang (CHN); W 1001–0010	Al-Zahrani (KSA); W 1010–0000	Akiyama (JPN); L 0001–0010	Bye	3rd place match Nyamkhüü (MGL); L 0000–1000	5
Masoud Khosravinejad	Men's 90 kg	—N/a	Fong (HKG); W 1000–0000	Pereteyko (UZB); W 0102–0030	Ochirbat (MGL); L 0001–0120	Bye	3rd place match Park (KOR); L 0001–0020	5
Abbas Fallah	Men's 100 kg	—N/a	Bye	Suzuki (JPN); L 0001–1100	Repechage; Sokolov (UZB); W 1001–0001	Repechage; Saade (LIB); W WO	3rd place match Khidirov (TJK); W 1141–0000	3rd place, bronze medalist(s)
Mahmoud Miran	Men's +100 kg	—N/a		Berduta (KAZ); W 1010–0010	Kang (KOR); W 1000–0000	Bye	Muneta (JPN); L 0100–1000	2nd place, silver medalist(s)
Mahmoud Miran	Men's openweight	—N/a	Bye	Liu (CHN); W 1001–0010	Tangriev (UZB); L 0011–1000	Bye	3rd place match Ikhsangaliyev (KAZ); W 1010–0100	3rd place, bronze medalist(s)

=== Karate ===
Athlete	Event	Round of 16	Quarterfinal	Semifinal	Final	Rank
Hossein Rouhani	Men's 60 kg	Al-Marzouq (JOR); W 2–0	Al-Qattan (KUW); W 2–2	Lee (KOR); W 10–2	Imai (JPN); L 2–3	2nd place, silver medalist(s)
Mehdi Amouzadeh	Men's 65 kg	Heuangmany (LAO); W 10–2	Mastonzoda (TJK); W 7–5	Al-Matrouk (KUW); W 2–0	Basri (INA); L 1–3	2nd place, silver medalist(s)
Alireza Katiraei	Men's 70 kg	Adwan (QAT); W 3–0	Al-Sharabi (YEM); W 4–0	Maharjan (NEP); W 4–2	Kazhymukanov (KAZ); W 2–0	1st place, gold medalist(s)
Jasem Vishkaei	Men's 75 kg	Bye	Kim (KOR); W 6–4	Rafati (QAT); W 2–0	Muneer (KUW); L 0–0	2nd place, silver medalist(s)
Mehran Behnamfar	Men's +75 kg	Abdullah (BRU); W 8–0	Al-Qadasi (YEM); W 5–0	Ismoilov (TJK); W 0–0	Korolev (KAZ); W 0–0	1st place, gold medalist(s)

=== Shooting ===
Athlete	Event	Qualification		Final			Team events			
Athlete	Event	Score	Rank	Score	Total	Rank	Athlete	Event	Score	Rank
Reza Ahmadi	Men's 10 m air rifle	569	44	Did not advance			Reza Ahmadi; Ehsan Homayouni; Hossein Jahanmiri	Men's 10 m air rifle team	1735	11
Ehsan Homayouni	Men's 10 m air rifle	587	16	Did not advance			Reza Ahmadi; Ehsan Homayouni; Hossein Jahanmiri	Men's 10 m air rifle team	1735	11
Hossein Jahanmiri	Men's 10 m air rifle	579	30	Did not advance			Reza Ahmadi; Ehsan Homayouni; Hossein Jahanmiri	Men's 10 m air rifle team	1735	11
Lida Fariman	Women's 10 m air rifle	387	22	Did not advance			Lida Fariman; Elham Hashemi; Yalda Khodabandeh	Women's 10 m air rifle team	1130	10
Elham Hashemi	Women's 10 m air rifle	378	32	Did not advance			Lida Fariman; Elham Hashemi; Yalda Khodabandeh	Women's 10 m air rifle team	1130	10
Yalda Khodabandeh	Women's 10 m air rifle	365	39	Did not advance			Lida Fariman; Elham Hashemi; Yalda Khodabandeh	Women's 10 m air rifle team	1130	10
Lida Fariman	Women's 50 m rifle prone	582	21	—N/a			Lida Fariman; Elham Hashemi; Raheleh Kheirollahzadeh	Women's 50 m rifle prone team	1740	6
Elham Hashemi	Women's 50 m rifle prone	575	33	—N/a			Lida Fariman; Elham Hashemi; Raheleh Kheirollahzadeh	Women's 50 m rifle prone team	1740	6
Raheleh Kheirollahzadeh	Women's 50 m rifle prone	583	18	—N/a			Lida Fariman; Elham Hashemi; Raheleh Kheirollahzadeh	Women's 50 m rifle prone team	1740	6
Lida Fariman	Women's 10 m running target	159	8	—N/a			Lida Fariman; Elham Hashemi; Raheleh Kheirollahzadeh	Women's 10 m running target team	358	3rd place, bronze medalist(s)
Elham Hashemi	Women's 10 m running target	96	10	—N/a			Lida Fariman; Elham Hashemi; Raheleh Kheirollahzadeh	Women's 10 m running target team	358	3rd place, bronze medalist(s)
Raheleh Kheirollahzadeh	Women's 10 m running target	103	9	—N/a			Lida Fariman; Elham Hashemi; Raheleh Kheirollahzadeh	Women's 10 m running target team	358	3rd place, bronze medalist(s)

=== Taekwondo ===
Athlete	Event	Round of 32	Round of 16	Quarterfinal	Semifinal	Final	Rank
Behzad Khodadad	Men's 58 kg	Dhabaia (PLE); W RSC (16–0)	Al-Aradi (BRN); W RSC (7–0)	Khegai (UZB); W RSC (10–0)	Bhandari (IND); W 4–1	Kim (KOR); L 2–11	2nd place, silver medalist(s)
Omid Gholamzadeh	Men's 62 kg	Bye	Bout (CAM); W 7–3	Kim (KOR); L 5–7	Did not advance		5
Hadi Saei	Men's 72 kg	Bye	Al-Daihani (KUW); W WO	In (CAM); W 13–0	Yerden (KAZ); W 11–3	Lee (KOR); W 4–3	1st place, gold medalist(s)
Majid Aflaki	Men's 78 kg	—N/a	Bye	Geisler (PHI); W 11–7	Oh (KOR); L 1–1	Did not advance	3rd place, bronze medalist(s)
Yousef Karami	Men's 84 kg	—N/a	Bye	Kim (KOR); L 6–7	Did not advance		5
Hadi Afshar	Men's +84 kg	—N/a	Lu (TPE); W 6–4	Al-Adhami (QAT); L 6–10	Did not advance		5
Tayyebeh Fadaeinejad	Women's 51 kg	—N/a	Abdulla (BRN); W RSC (12–1)	Putri (INA); L 2–6	Did not advance		5
Parvaneh Tehrani	Women's 55 kg	—N/a	Phạm (VIE); W 1–1	Norden (BHU); W 4–0	Premwaew (THA); L 2–7	Did not advance	3rd place, bronze medalist(s)
Marzieh Asadi	Women's 59 kg	—N/a	Bye	Lê (VIE); L 2–4	Did not advance		5

=== Volleyball ===
Team	Event	Preliminary round					Semifinal	Final	Rank
Team	Event	Round 1	Round 2	Round 3	Round 4	Rank	Semifinal	Final	Rank
Iran	Men	Macau; W 3–0 (25–15, 25–15, 25–15)	India; W 3–2 (25–20, 25–23, 37–39, 26–28, 15–12)	Qatar; W 3–0 (25–22, 25–15, 25–22)	South Korea; L 0–3 (17–25, 20–25, 12–25)	2 Q	China; W 3–2 (25–16, 19–25, 25–21, 22–25, 15–11)	South Korea; L 0–3 (18–25, 19–25, 23–25)	2nd place, silver medalist(s)
Roster: Amir Hossein Monazzami; Amir Hosseini; Abbas Ghasemian; Peyman Akbari; Mohammad Mansouri; Ahsanollah Shirkavand; Mahmoud Afshardoust; Behnam Mahmoudi; Mohammad Torkashvand; Afshin Oliaei; Alireza Behboudi; Rahman Mohammadirad; Coach: (South Korea) Park Ki-won

=== Weightlifting ===
Athlete	Event	Snatch		Clean & Jerk		Total	
Athlete	Event	Result	Rank	Result	Rank	Result	Rank
Mehdi Panzvan	Men's 69 kg	150.0	3	175.0	3	325.0	3rd place, bronze medalist(s)
Mohammad Hossein Barkhah	Men's 77 kg	160.0	3	202.5 GR	2	362.5	2nd place, silver medalist(s)
Mohammad Ali Falahatinejad	Men's 77 kg	150.0	6	200.0	3	350.0	3rd place, bronze medalist(s)
Shahin Nassirinia	Men's 85 kg	NM	—	—	—	—	—
Hadi Panzvan	Men's 85 kg	167.5	1	200.0	2	367.5	2nd place, silver medalist(s)
Kourosh Bagheri	Men's 94 kg	175.0	3	210.0	2	385.0	2nd place, silver medalist(s)
Hossein Tavakkoli	Men's 105 kg	180.0	5	220.0	3	400.0	3rd place, bronze medalist(s)
Hossein Rezazadeh	Men's +105 kg	200.0 GR	1	240.0 GR	1	440.0 GR	1st place, gold medalist(s)

=== Wrestling ===
Freestyle

Athlete	Event	Group round				Quarterfinal or Repechage	Semifinal	Final	Rank
Athlete	Event	Round 1	Round 2	Round 3	Rank	Quarterfinal or Repechage	Semifinal	Final	Rank
Mohammad Rezaei	Men's 55 kg	Naranbaatar (MGL); W 5–2	Kim (KOR); W 4–2	—N/a	1 Q	—N/a	Mansurov (UZB); L 0–11	3rd place match Mamyrov (KAZ); W 10–0	3rd place, bronze medalist(s)
Masoud Mostafa-Jokar	Men's 60 kg	Ri (PRK); W Fall (7–2)	Nadyrbek Uulu (KGZ); L WO	Siddiq (QAT); W WO	2	—N/a	Did not advance		6
Alireza Dabir	Men's 66 kg	Mohammed (QAT); W 10–0	Pehlwan (PAK); W 11–0	—N/a	1 Q	Bye	Bayarmagnai (MGL); W 3–2	Baek (KOR); L 1–3	2nd place, silver medalist(s)
Mehdi Hajizadeh	Men's 74 kg	Ali (PAK); W 8–2	Maan (IND); W 9–1	Batchuluun (MGL); W 6–0	1 Q	—N/a	Abdusalomov (TJK); L 7–9	3rd place match Siriguleng (CHN); W 9–0	3rd place, bronze medalist(s)
Pejman Dorostkar	Men's 84 kg	Aliev (TJK); L 2–3	Semba (JPN); W 4–1	—N/a	2	—N/a	Did not advance		5
Alireza Heidari	Men's 96 kg	Wang (CHN); W Fall (5–3)	Bayramukov (KAZ); W 4–0	Mann (IND); W 8–0	1 Q	Bye	Ibragimov (UZB); W 3–1	Krupnyakov (KGZ); W 5–0	1st place, gold medalist(s)
Abbas Jadidi	Men's 120 kg	Villanueva (PHI); W 11–0	Li (CHN); W 5–1	Jamal (QAT); W 10–0	1 Q	Bye	Cheema (IND); W Fall (5–0)	Taymazov (UZB); L 0–10	2nd place, silver medalist(s)

Greco-Roman

Athlete	Event	Group round				Quarterfinal or Repechage	Semifinal	Final	Rank
Athlete	Event	Round 1	Round 2	Round 3	Rank	Quarterfinal or Repechage	Semifinal	Final	Rank
Hamid Banitamim	Men's 55 kg	Kang (PRK); L 0–6	Khatri (IND); L 5–6	—N/a	3	Did not advance			9
Ali Ashkani	Men's 60 kg	Al-Mandi (YEM); W 11–0	Mamedow (TKM); W 3–2	—N/a	1 Q	Koizhaiganov (KAZ); L 1–4	Did not advance		5
Mehdi Nassiri	Men's 66 kg	Manukyan (KAZ); L 1–2	Kobonov (KGZ); L Fall (0–4)	—N/a	3	—N/a	Did not advance		9
Parviz Zeidvand	Men's 74 kg	El-Habeche (LIB); W 10–0	Nawaf (QAT); W 13–0	—N/a	1 Q	—N/a	Khalimov (KAZ); L 1–3	3rd place match Biktyakov (UZB); W 3–0	3rd place, bronze medalist(s)
Majid Ramezani	Men's 84 kg	Erofaylov (UZB); L 1–7	Al-Araj (JOR); W 6–1	Mambetov (KAZ); L 2–6	3	Did not advance			8
Masoud Hashemzadeh	Men's 96 kg	Assembekov (KAZ); W 3–0	Cheglakov (UZB); L 0–4	—N/a	2 QR	Repechage; Jiang (CHN) W 3–1; Morikaku (JPN) W 3–0	Park (KOR); L 1–3	3rd place match Al-Haiek (SYR); W 4–0	3rd place, bronze medalist(s)
Alireza Gharibi	Men's 120 kg	Go (PHI); W 11–0	Kuziev (UZB); W 8–0	—N/a	1 Q	Bye	Tsurtsumia (KAZ); L 0–3	3rd place match Kuziev (UZB); W 4–2	3rd place, bronze medalist(s)

=== Wushu ===
Taolu

Athlete	Event	Round 1			Round 2			Round 3			Total	Rank
Athlete	Event	Form	Score	Rank	Form	Score	Rank	Form	Score	Rank	Total	Rank
Arash Azizi	Men's changquan combined	Changquan	9.15	12	Daoshu	9.13	13	Gunshu	9.21	10	27.49	11
Hadi Ghamkhar	Men's nanquan combined	Nanquan	9.28	12	Nandao	9.25	11	Nangun	9.23	12	27.76	11

Sanshou

Athlete	Event	Round of 16	Quarterfinal	Semifinal	Final	Rank
Mehdi Jafarpour	Men's 52 kg	Phan (VIE); W 2–1	Khamsounthone (LAO); L 1–2	Did not advance		5
Ramin Movahednia	Men's 56 kg	Kim (KOR); L 1–2	Did not advance			9
Mehdi Mohammadinasab	Men's 60 kg	Pasiwat (PHI); L 0–2	Did not advance			9
Mohammad Aghaei	Men's 65 kg	Enami (JPN); W 2–0	Phùng (VIE); W 2–0	Yu (CHN); W 2–1	Chomphuphuang (THA); L 0–2	2nd place, silver medalist(s)
Hossein Ojaghi	Men's 70 kg	—N/a	Saparbekov (KGZ); W 2–0	Li (CHN); W 2–0	Ponork (THA); W 2–0	1st place, gold medalist(s)
