= Shooting at the 2002 Asian Games – Women's 10 metre air rifle =

Women's 10 metre air rifle at the 2002 Asian Games
- Venue: Changwon International Shooting Range
- Dates: 2 October 2002
- Competitors: 43 from 18 nations

Medalists
gold medal	Zhao Yinghui	China
silver medal	Gao Jing	China
bronze medal	Park Un-kyong	South Korea

The women's 10 metre air rifle competition at the 2002 Asian Games in Busan, South Korea was held on 2 October at the Changwon International Shooting Range.

== Schedule ==
All times are Korea Standard Time (UTC+09:00)

Date	Time	Event
Wednesday, 2 October 2002	09:00	Qualification
Wednesday, 2 October 2002	13:00	Final

== Records ==
Prior to this competition, the existing world, Asian and Games records were as follows.

Qualification
World Record	Seo Sun-hwa (KOR)	400	Sydney, Australia	12 April 2002
Asian Record	Seo Sun-hwa (KOR)	400	Sydney, Australia	12 April 2002
Games Record	Kim Jung-mi (KOR)	396	Bangkok, Thailand	7 December 1998
Final
World Record	Sonja Pfeilschifter (GER)	504.2	Milan, Italy	1 June 2002
Asian Record	Lee Sun-min (KOR)	503.1	Munich, Germany	20 May 1999
Games Record	Kim Jung-mi (KOR)	498.6	Bangkok, Thailand	7 December 1998

== Results ==
Legend

- DNS — Did not start

=== Qualification ===
Rank	Athlete	Series				Total	Notes
Rank	Athlete	1	2	3	4	Total	Notes
1	Zhao Yinghui (CHN)	100	100	99	100	399	GR
2	Park Un-kyong (KOR)	100	100	100	99	399	GR
3	Gao Jing (CHN)	100	99	99	100	398	
4	Suma Shirur (IND)	99	99	100	99	397	
5	Du Li (CHN)	100	100	99	98	397	
6	Sununtha Kuntapong (THA)	98	100	98	100	396	
7	Anjali Bhagwat (IND)	98	100	100	98	396	
8	Seo Sun-hwa (KOR)	97	100	98	100	395	
9	Zorigtyn Batkhuyag (MGL)	97	98	100	99	394	
9	Damdinsürengiin Lkhamsüren (MGL)	96	100	99	99	394	
9	Deepali Deshpande (IND)	99	98	99	98	394	
12	Nurul Hudda Baharin (MAS)	99	98	97	99	393	
13	Kim Myong-hui (PRK)	97	98	98	99	392	
13	Piyawan Pusuwan (THA)	97	97	100	98	392	
15	Naoko Imai (JPN)	97	97	99	97	390	
16	Galina Korchma (KAZ)	97	96	97	99	389	
16	Yuko Aizawa (JPN)	96	98	96	99	389	
16	Mari Onoe (JPN)	98	96	97	98	389	
16	Kim Hyung-mi (KOR)	98	98	95	98	389	
20	Nor Dalilah Abu Bakar (MAS)	96	98	95	99	388	
20	Sasithorn Hongprasert (THA)	94	99	98	97	388	
22	Lida Fariman (IRI)	97	95	98	97	387	
22	Suraiya Akhter (BAN)	96	98	98	95	387	
24	Sabrina Sultana (BAN)	95	95	97	99	386	
24	Pushpamali Ramanayake (SRI)	96	98	96	96	386	
26	Olga Dovgun (KAZ)	92	98	97	96	383	
26	Nazish Khan (PAK)	93	98	96	96	383	
28	Varvara Kovalenko (KAZ)	96	95	97	94	382	
29	Jasmin Luis (PHI)	95	93	97	95	380	
29	Rentsengiin Oyuun-Otgon (MGL)	95	95	95	95	380	
31	Roslina Bakar (MAS)	97	92	95	95	379	
32	Urooj Zahid (PAK)	96	91	93	98	378	
32	Elham Hashemi (IRI)	96	95	95	92	378	
34	Elena Kostyukova (KGZ)	96	95	90	94	375	
35	Bivaswari Rai (NEP)	95	95	90	93	373	
36	Fawzia Karim (BAN)	92	93	94	91	370	
37	Nadia Saeed (PAK)	95	90	93	91	369	
38	Ýeketerina Arabowa (TKM)	93	89	90	96	368	
39	Yalda Khodabandeh (IRI)	92	93	85	95	365	
40	Laila Abbasi (QAT)	91	89	89	91	360	
41	Muna Al-Mejali (QAT)	90	88	93	88	359	
42	Sabika Al-Muhannadi (QAT)	89	88	89	91	357	
—	Indunil Pussella (SRI)					DNS	

=== Final ===
Rank	Athlete	Qual.	Final											Total	S-off	Notes
Rank	Athlete	Qual.	1	2	3	4	5	6	7	8	9	10	Total	Total	S-off	Notes
1st place, gold medalist(s)	Zhao Yinghui (CHN)	399	10.5	10.2	10.7	9.8	10.0	10.6	10.3	10.0	9.8	10.5	102.4	501.4		GR
2nd place, silver medalist(s)	Gao Jing (CHN)	398	10.8	10.7	10.1	9.6	10.8	10.2	10.3	10.2	10.9	9.4	103.0	501.0		
3rd place, bronze medalist(s)	Park Un-kyong (KOR)	399	10.3	10.0	9.9	10.4	10.0	9.7	10.5	10.0	10.5	10.3	101.6	500.6		
4	Anjali Bhagwat (IND)	396	10.7	10.2	10.4	10.7	10.2	10.4	9.7	10.7	10.8	10.7	104.5	500.5		
5	Suma Shirur (IND)	397	9.8	9.9	10.2	9.6	10.7	10.3	10.7	10.4	10.8	10.5	102.9	499.9		
6	Du Li (CHN)	397	10.2	10.0	10.2	10.4	10.2	10.4	9.5	10.6	10.3	10.4	102.2	499.2		
7	Seo Sun-hwa (KOR)	395	10.4	10.4	10.1	10.4	10.1	10.4	10.1	10.8	10.2	10.1	103.0	498.0		
8	Sununtha Kuntapong (THA)	396	10.2	10.6	10.4	9.8	10.3	10.1	9.5	10.3	9.3	10.3	100.8	496.8		
