= Taekwondo at the 2002 Asian Games – Men's 58 kg =

Taekwondo competition in South Korea

Men's 58 kg at the 2002 Asian Games
- Venue: Gudeok Gymnasium
- Date: 11 October 2002
- Competitors: 27 from 27 nations

Medalists
gold medal	Kim Dae-ryung	South Korea
silver medal	Behzad Khodadad	Iran
bronze medal	Surendra Bhandari	India
bronze medal	Tshomlee Go	Philippines

The men's flyweight (−58 kilograms) event at the 2002 Asian Games took place on 11 October 2002 at Gudeok Gymnasium, Busan, South Korea.

== Schedule ==
All times are Korea Standard Time (UTC+09:00)

Date	Time	Event
Friday, 11 October 2002	14:00	Round 1
Friday, 11 October 2002	14:00	Round 2
Friday, 11 October 2002	14:00	Round 3
Friday, 11 October 2002	14:00	Semifinals
Friday, 11 October 2002	19:00	Final

== Results ==
Legend

- DQ — Won by disqualification
- R — Won by referee stop contest

=== Final ===
Final
Behzad Khodadad (IRI)	2
Kim Dae-ryung (KOR)	11

=== Top half ===
Round 1
Behzad Khodadad (IRI)	16^{R}
Maree Dhabaia (PLE)	0
Farhad Qraishi (AFG)	0
Eduard Khegai (UZB)	7
Sultan Al-Mutairi (KUW)	5
Kinley Rabgay (BHU)	3
Anas Aqlan (YEM)	3
Wong Ming Kin (HKG)	0
Kumar Bahadur Karki (NEP)	DQ
Mukdanin Phongpachith (LAO)

Round 2
Ali Al-Aradi (BRN)	0
Behzad Khodadad (IRI)	7^{R}
Eduard Khegai (UZB)	4
Sultan Al-Mutairi (KUW)	1
Byambaadorjiin Chuluun (MGL)	0
Anas Aqlan (YEM)	8
Kumar Bahadur Karki (NEP)	0
Surendra Bhandari (IND)	3

Round 3
Behzad Khodadad (IRI)	10^{R}
Eduard Khegai (UZB)	0
Anas Aqlan (YEM)	3
Surendra Bhandari (IND)	3

Semifinals
Behzad Khodadad (IRI)	4
Surendra Bhandari (IND)	1

=== Bottom half ===
Round 1
Tshomlee Go (PHI)	10
Firuz Fayziev (TJK)	1
Nguyễn Quốc Huân (VIE)	0
Huang Ching-feng (TPE)	3
Batyrbek Yestavletov (KAZ)	6
Zeng Gengzun (CHN)	4
Maksat Zrkebaev (KGZ)
Mohammad Abuzagha (JOR)	DQ
Mohammed Al-Anuzi (KSA)	7
Satriyo Rahadhani (INA)	4
Abdulqader Mohammed (QAT)	6
Ussadate Sutthikunkarn (THA)	4

Round 2
Cheat Khemara (CAM)	0
Tshomlee Go (PHI)	6
Huang Ching-feng (TPE)	3
Batyrbek Yestavletov (KAZ)	3
Mohammad Abuzagha (JOR)	3
Mohammed Al-Anuzi (KSA)	5
Abdulqader Mohammed (QAT)	2
Kim Dae-ryung (KOR)	4

Round 3
Tshomlee Go (PHI)	3^{R}
Huang Ching-feng (TPE)	0
Mohammed Al-Anuzi (KSA)	0
Kim Dae-ryung (KOR)	8

Semifinals
Tshomlee Go (PHI)	1
Kim Dae-ryung (KOR)	6
