= Shooting at the 2002 Asian Games – Women's 50 metre rifle prone =

Women's 50 metre rifle prone at the 2002 Asian Games
- Venue: Changwon International Shooting Range
- Dates: 4 October 2002
- Competitors: 42 from 18 nations

Medalists
gold medal	Olga Dovgun	Kazakhstan
silver medal	Lee Mi-kyung	South Korea
bronze medal	Elena Kostyukova	Kyrgyzstan

The women's 50 metre rifle prone competition at the 2002 Asian Games in Busan, South Korea was held on 4 October at the Changwon International Shooting Range.

== Schedule ==
All times are Korea Standard Time (UTC+09:00)

Date	Time	Event
Friday, 4 October 2002	09:00	Final

== Records ==
Prior to this competition, the existing world, Asian and Games records were as follows.

World Record	Marina Bobkova (RUS)	597	Barcelona, Spain	19 July 1998
Asian Record	Olga Dovgun (KAZ)	597	Lahti, Finland	4 July 2002
Games Record	Zhang Qiuping (CHN)	592	Beijing, China	26 September 1990

== Results ==
Rank	Athlete	Series						Total	Notes
Rank	Athlete	1	2	3	4	5	6	Total	Notes
1st place, gold medalist(s)	Olga Dovgun (KAZ)	100	99	100	100	100	98	597	GR
2nd place, silver medalist(s)	Lee Mi-kyung (KOR)	100	100	99	99	100	98	596	
3rd place, bronze medalist(s)	Elena Kostyukova (KGZ)	100	100	100	97	99	99	595	
4	Wang Xian (CHN)	98	100	99	98	100	99	594	
5	Galina Korchma (KAZ)	100	99	98	99	99	98	593	
6	Shan Hong (CHN)	97	99	99	99	99	99	592	
7	Kong Hyun-ah (KOR)	99	99	97	99	99	99	592	
8	Gao Jing (CHN)	98	100	99	100	98	97	592	
9	Lee Sun-min (KOR)	99	98	99	97	99	98	590	
10	Pushpamali Ramanayake (SRI)	96	97	99	98	99	99	588	
10	Nurul Hudda Baharin (MAS)	99	97	97	100	98	97	588	
12	Rentsengiin Oyuun-Otgon (MGL)	97	99	95	99	97	99	586	
12	Zorigtyn Batkhuyag (MGL)	99	96	98	98	98	97	586	
14	Indunil Pussella (SRI)	99	96	96	96	99	99	585	
14	Anjali Bhagwat (IND)	98	98	95	99	96	99	585	
14	Damdinsürengiin Lkhamsüren (MGL)	95	99	99	99	96	97	585	
17	Kim Myong-hui (PRK)	98	96	96	97	98	99	584	
18	Raheleh Kheirollahzadeh (IRI)	99	96	97	95	97	99	583	
18	Pojjanee Pongsinwijit (THA)	97	96	99	97	96	98	583	
18	Ýeketerina Arabowa (TKM)	97	98	98	96	98	96	583	
21	Roslina Bakar (MAS)	95	96	98	98	97	98	582	
21	Varvara Kovalenko (KAZ)	96	96	97	97	99	97	582	
21	Nattichata Siththipong (THA)	95	98	97	97	99	96	582	
21	Lida Fariman (IRI)	95	98	98	96	99	96	582	
21	Sabrina Sultana (BAN)	97	98	99	97	97	94	582	
26	Mari Onoe (JPN)	95	97	98	98	98	95	581	
26	Jasmin Luis (PHI)	97	98	95	96	98	97	581	
28	Ako Sasaki (JPN)	97	98	92	98	96	97	578	
28	Nor Dalilah Abu Bakar (MAS)	96	98	95	97	98	94	578	
30	Raj Kumari (IND)	97	97	96	98	95	94	577	
31	Matara Al-Aseiri (QAT)	97	92	95	97	96	99	576	
31	Kuheli Gangulee (IND)	96	96	98	93	95	98	576	
33	Elham Hashemi (IRI)	96	96	97	94	97	95	575	
34	Yu Hsiao-fen (TPE)	96	96	95	93	97	97	574	
35	Yuko Aizawa (JPN)	98	97	93	94	93	97	572	
36	Muna Al-Mejali (QAT)	94	96	93	96	97	93	569	
36	Sasithorn Hongprasert (THA)	93	93	96	99	97	91	569	
38	Urooj Zahid (PAK)	97	96	90	92	95	98	568	
39	Nazish Khan (PAK)	96	92	93	95	95	94	565	
39	Laila Abbasi (QAT)	95	95	94	93	94	94	565	
41	Nadia Saeed (PAK)	92	91	94	92	92	91	552	
42	Fawzia Karim (BAN)	88	87	92	89	93	95	544	
