= Shooting at the 2002 Asian Games – Women's 10 metre air rifle team =

Women's 10 metre air rifle team at the 2002 Asian Games
- Venue: Changwon International Shooting Range
- Dates: 2 October 2002
- Competitors: 36 from 12 nations

Medalists
gold medal	China; Du Li, Gao Jing, Zhao Yinghui
silver medal	India; Anjali Bhagwat, Deepali Deshpande, Suma Shirur
bronze medal	South Korea; Kim Hyung-mi, Park Un-kyong, Seo Sun-hwa

The women's 10 metre air rifle team competition at the 2002 Asian Games in Busan, South Korea was held on 2 October at the Changwon International Shooting Range.

== Schedule ==
All times are Korea Standard Time (UTC+09:00)

Date	Time	Event
Wednesday, 2 October 2002	09:00	Final

== Records ==
Prior to this competition, the existing world, Asian and Games records were as follows.

World Record	China	1190	Lahti, Finland	8 July 2002
Asian Record	China	1190	Lahti, Finland	8 July 2002
Games Record	Thailand	1178	Bangkok, Thailand	7 December 1998

== Results ==
Rank	Team	Series				Total	Notes
Rank	Team	1	2	3	4	Total	Notes
1st place, gold medalist(s)	China (CHN)	300	299	297	298	1194	WR
	Du Li	100	100	99	98	397	
	Gao Jing	100	99	99	100	398	
	Zhao Yinghui	100	100	99	100	399	
2nd place, silver medalist(s)	India (IND)	296	297	299	295	1187	
	Anjali Bhagwat	98	100	100	98	396	
	Deepali Deshpande	99	98	99	98	394	
	Suma Shirur	99	99	100	99	397	
3rd place, bronze medalist(s)	South Korea (KOR)	295	298	293	297	1183	
	Kim Hyung-mi	98	98	95	98	389	
	Park Un-kyong	100	100	100	99	399	
	Seo Sun-hwa	97	100	98	100	395	
4	Thailand (THA)	289	296	296	295	1176	
	Sasithorn Hongprasert	94	99	98	97	388	
	Sununtha Kuntapong	98	100	98	100	396	
	Piyawan Pusuwan	97	97	100	98	392	
5	Japan (JPN)	291	291	292	294	1168	
	Yuko Aizawa	96	98	96	99	389	
	Naoko Imai	97	97	99	97	390	
	Mari Onoe	98	96	97	98	389	
5	Mongolia (MGL)	288	293	294	293	1168	
	Zorigtyn Batkhuyag	97	98	100	99	394	
	Damdinsürengiin Lkhamsüren	96	100	99	99	394	
	Rentsengiin Oyuun-Otgon	95	95	95	95	380	
7	Malaysia (MAS)	292	288	287	293	1160	
	Nor Dalilah Abu Bakar	96	98	95	99	388	
	Nurul Hudda Baharin	99	98	97	99	393	
	Roslina Bakar	97	92	95	95	379	
8	Kazakhstan (KAZ)	285	289	291	289	1154	
	Olga Dovgun	92	98	97	96	383	
	Galina Korchma	97	96	97	99	389	
	Varvara Kovalenko	96	95	97	94	382	
9	Bangladesh (BAN)	283	286	289	285	1143	
	Suraiya Akhter	96	98	98	95	387	
	Fawzia Karim	92	93	94	91	370	
	Sabrina Sultana	95	95	97	99	386	
10	Pakistan (PAK)	284	279	282	285	1130	
	Nazish Khan	93	98	96	96	383	
	Nadia Saeed	95	90	93	91	369	
	Urooj Zahid	96	91	93	98	378	
10	Iran (IRI)	285	283	278	284	1130	
	Lida Fariman	97	95	98	97	387	
	Elham Hashemi	96	95	95	92	378	
	Yalda Khodabandeh	92	93	85	95	365	
12	Qatar (QAT)	270	265	271	270	1076	
	Laila Abbasi	91	89	89	91	360	
	Muna Al-Mejali	90	88	93	88	359	
	Sabika Al-Muhannadi	89	88	89	91	357	
