= Shooting at the 2002 Asian Games – Women's 50 metre rifle prone team =

Women's 50 metre rifle prone team at the 2002 Asian Games
- Venue: Changwon International Shooting Range
- Dates: 4 October 2002
- Competitors: 33 from 11 nations

Medalists
gold medal	South Korea; Kong Hyun-ah, Lee Mi-kyung, Lee Sun-min
silver medal	China; Gao Jing, Shan Hong, Wang Xian
bronze medal	Kazakhstan; Olga Dovgun, Galina Korchma, Varvara Kovalenko

The women's 50 metre rifle prone team competition at the 2002 Asian Games in Busan, South Korea was held on 4 October at the Changwon International Shooting Range.

== Schedule ==
All times are Korea Standard Time (UTC+09:00)

Date	Time	Event
Friday, 4 October 2002	09:00	Final

== Records ==
Prior to this competition, the existing world, Asian and Games records were as follows.

World Record	Soviet Union	1786	Moscow, Soviet Union	15 August 1990
Asian Record	China	1771	Barcelona, Spain	20 July 1998
Games Record	North Korea	1764	Beijing, China	26 September 1990

== Results ==
Rank	Team	Series						Total	Notes
Rank	Team	1	2	3	4	5	6	Total	Notes
1st place, gold medalist(s)	South Korea (KOR)	298	297	295	295	298	295	1778	AR
	Kong Hyun-ah	99	99	97	99	99	99	592	
	Lee Mi-kyung	100	100	99	99	100	98	596	
	Lee Sun-min	99	98	99	97	99	98	590	
2nd place, silver medalist(s)	China (CHN)	293	299	297	297	297	295	1778	AR
	Gao Jing	98	100	99	100	98	97	592	
	Shan Hong	97	99	99	99	99	99	592	
	Wang Xian	98	100	99	98	100	99	594	
3rd place, bronze medalist(s)	Kazakhstan (KAZ)	296	294	295	296	298	293	1772	
	Olga Dovgun	100	99	100	100	100	98	597	
	Galina Korchma	100	99	98	99	99	98	593	
	Varvara Kovalenko	96	96	97	97	99	97	582	
4	Mongolia (MGL)	291	294	292	296	291	293	1757	
	Zorigtyn Batkhuyag	99	96	98	98	98	97	586	
	Damdinsürengiin Lkhamsüren	95	99	99	99	96	97	585	
	Rentsengiin Oyuun-Otgon	97	99	95	99	97	99	586	
5	Malaysia (MAS)	290	291	290	295	293	289	1748	
	Nor Dalilah Abu Bakar	96	98	95	97	98	94	578	
	Nurul Hudda Baharin	99	97	97	100	98	97	588	
	Roslina Bakar	95	96	98	98	97	98	582	
6	Iran (IRI)	290	290	292	285	293	290	1740	
	Lida Fariman	95	98	98	96	99	96	582	
	Elham Hashemi	96	96	97	94	97	95	575	
	Raheleh Kheirollahzadeh	99	96	97	95	97	99	583	
7	India (IND)	291	291	289	290	286	291	1738	
	Anjali Bhagwat	98	98	95	99	96	99	585	
	Kuheli Gangulee	96	96	98	93	95	98	576	
	Raj Kumari	97	97	96	98	95	94	577	
8	Thailand (THA)	285	287	292	293	292	285	1734	
	Sasithorn Hongprasert	93	93	96	99	97	91	569	
	Pojjanee Pongsinwijit	97	96	99	97	96	98	583	
	Nattichata Siththipong	95	98	97	97	99	96	582	
9	Japan (JPN)	290	292	283	290	287	289	1731	
	Yuko Aizawa	98	97	93	94	93	97	572	
	Mari Onoe	95	97	98	98	98	95	581	
	Ako Sasaki	97	98	92	98	96	97	578	
10	Qatar (QAT)	286	283	282	286	287	286	1710	
	Laila Abbasi	95	95	94	93	94	94	565	
	Matara Al-Aseiri	97	92	95	97	96	99	576	
	Muna Al-Mejali	94	96	93	96	97	93	569	
11	Pakistan (PAK)	285	279	277	279	282	283	1685	
	Nazish Khan	96	92	93	95	95	94	565	
	Nadia Saeed	92	91	94	92	92	91	552	
	Urooj Zahid	97	96	90	92	95	98	568	
