= Wrestling at the 2002 Asian Games – Men's freestyle 74 kg =

Men's freestyle 74 kg at the 2002 Asian Games
- Venue: Yangsan Gymnasium
- Date: 7–8 October 2002
- Competitors: 14 from 14 nations

Medalists
| gold medal | Cho Byung-kwan | South Korea |
| silver medal | Yusup Abdusalomov | Tajikistan |
| bronze medal | Mehdi Hajizadeh | Iran |

The men's freestyle 74 kilograms wrestling competition at the 2002 Asian Games in Busan was held on 7 October and 8 October at the Yangsan Gymnasium.

The competition held with an elimination system of three or four wrestlers in each pool, with the winners qualify for the semifinals and final by way of direct elimination.

== Schedule ==
All times are Korea Standard Time (UTC+09:00)

| Date | Time | Event |
|---|---|---|
| Monday, 7 October 2002 | 10:00 | Round 1 |
| Monday, 7 October 2002 | 16:00 | Round 2 |
| Tuesday, 8 October 2002 | 10:00 | Round 3 |
| Tuesday, 8 October 2002 | 10:00 | 1/2 finals |
| Tuesday, 8 October 2002 | 16:00 | Finals |

== Results ==
=== Preliminary ===
==== Pool 1 ====
| Pos | Athlete | Pld | W | L | CP | TP | Qualification |
|---|---|---|---|---|---|---|---|
| 1 | Cho Byung-kwan (KOR) | 2 | 2 | 0 | 7 | 16 | Knockout round |
| 2 | Almaz Askarov (KGZ) | 2 | 1 | 1 | 4 | 2 | |
| 3 | Abbas Saeed (QAT) | 2 | 0 | 2 | 0 | 0 | |

Source: Report

| | Score | | CP |
|---|---|---|---|
| Cho Byung-kwan (KOR) | 6–0 | Almaz Askarov (KGZ) | 3–0 PO |
| Abbas Saeed (QAT) | 0–10 | Cho Byung-kwan (KOR) | 0–4 ST |
| Almaz Askarov (KGZ) | 2–0 Fall | Abbas Saeed (QAT) | 4–0 TO |

==== Pool 2 ====
| Pos | Athlete | Pld | W | L | CP | TP | Qualification |
|---|---|---|---|---|---|---|---|
| 1 | Siriguleng (CHN) | 2 | 2 | 0 | 6 | 12 | Knockout round |
| 2 | Ahmad Al-Osta (SYR) | 2 | 1 | 1 | 4 | 4 | |
| 3 | Shirjan Ahmadi (AFG) | 2 | 0 | 2 | 2 | 3 | |

Source: Report

| | Score | | CP |
|---|---|---|---|
| Ahmad Al-Osta (SYR) | 1–5 | Siriguleng (CHN) | 1–3 PP |
| Shirjan Ahmadi (AFG) | 1–3 | Ahmad Al-Osta (SYR) | 1–3 PP |
| Siriguleng (CHN) | 7–2 | Shirjan Ahmadi (AFG) | 3–1 PP |

==== Pool 3 ====
| Pos | Athlete | Pld | W | L | CP | TP | Qualification |
|---|---|---|---|---|---|---|---|
| 1 | Yusup Abdusalomov (TJK) | 3 | 2 | 1 | 8 (Note: Number of wins by fall: TJK 1, JPN 0, KAZ 0. Obata and Laliyev were ranked by their head-to-head result: JPN 3–1 KAZ.) | 15 | Knockout round |
| 2 | Kunihiko Obata (JPN) | 3 | 2 | 1 | 8 | 10 | |
| 3 | Gennadiy Laliyev (KAZ) | 3 | 2 | 1 | 8 | 14 | |
| 4 | Marciano Basas (PHI) | 3 | 0 | 3 | 1 | 0 | |

Source: Report
Notes:

| | Score | | CP |
|---|---|---|---|
| Marciano Basas (PHI) | 0–10 | Gennadiy Laliyev (KAZ) | 0–4 ST |
| Yusup Abdusalomov (TJK) | 5–2 | Kunihiko Obata (JPN) | 3–1 PP |
| Marciano Basas (PHI) | 0–9 Fall | Yusup Abdusalomov (TJK) | 0–4 TO |
| Gennadiy Laliyev (KAZ) | 1–3 | Kunihiko Obata (JPN) | 1–3 PP |
| Marciano Basas (PHI) | 0–5 Ret | Kunihiko Obata (JPN) | 0–4 PA |
| Gennadiy Laliyev (KAZ) | 3–1 | Yusup Abdusalomov (TJK) | 3–1 PP |

==== Pool 4 ====
| Pos | Athlete | Pld | W | L | CP | TP | Qualification |
|---|---|---|---|---|---|---|---|
| 1 | Mehdi Hajizadeh (IRI) | 3 | 3 | 0 | 9 | 23 | Knockout round |
| 2 | Sujeet Maan (IND) | 3 | 2 | 1 | 8 | 11 | |
| 3 | Battuyaagiin Batchuluun (MGL) | 3 | 1 | 2 | 5 | 8 | |
| 4 | Muhammad Ali (PAK) | 3 | 0 | 3 | 1 | 5 | |

Source: Report

| | Score | | CP |
|---|---|---|---|
| Mehdi Hajizadeh (IRI) | 8–2 | Muhammad Ali (PAK) | 3–1 PP |
| Sujeet Maan (IND) | 3–2 | Battuyaagiin Batchuluun (MGL) | 3–1 PP |
| Mehdi Hajizadeh (IRI) | 9–1 | Sujeet Maan (IND) | 3–1 PP |
| Muhammad Ali (PAK) | 3–6 Fall | Battuyaagiin Batchuluun (MGL) | 0–4 TO |
| Mehdi Hajizadeh (IRI) | 6–0 | Battuyaagiin Batchuluun (MGL) | 3–0 PO |
| Muhammad Ali (PAK) | 0–7 Fall | Sujeet Maan (IND) | 0–4 TO |

=== Knockout round ===
1/2 finals
Cho Byung-kwan (KOR) | 3
Siriguleng (CHN) | 3
Yusup Abdusalomov (TJK) | 9
Mehdi Hajizadeh (IRI) | 7

Final
Cho Byung-kwan (KOR) | 4
Yusup Abdusalomov (TJK) | 0
3rd–4th place
Siriguleng (CHN) | 0
Mehdi Hajizadeh (IRI) | 9

== Final standing ==
| Rank | Athlete |
|---|---|
| 1st place, gold medalist(s) | Cho Byung-kwan (KOR) |
| 2nd place, silver medalist(s) | Yusup Abdusalomov (TJK) |
| 3rd place, bronze medalist(s) | Mehdi Hajizadeh (IRI) |
| 4 | Siriguleng (CHN) |
| 5 | Gennadiy Laliyev (KAZ) |
| 6 | Sujeet Maan (IND) |
| 7 | Kunihiko Obata (JPN) |
| 8 | Battuyaagiin Batchuluun (MGL) |
| 9 | Ahmad Al-Osta (SYR) |
| 10 | Almaz Askarov (KGZ) |
| 11 | Shirjan Ahmadi (AFG) |
| 12 | Muhammad Ali (PAK) |
| 13 | Abbas Saeed (QAT) |
| 14 | Marciano Basas (PHI) |
