= Karate at the 2002 Asian Games – Men's kumite +75 kg =

Karate competition

Men's kumite +75 kg at the 2002 Asian Games
- Venue: Yangsan College Gymnasium
- Date: 11 October
- Competitors: 16 from 16 nations

Medalists
gold medal	Mehran Behnamfar	Iran
silver medal	Andrey Korolev	Kazakhstan
bronze medal	Jaber Al-Hammad	Kuwait
bronze medal	Isroil Ismoilov	Tajikistan

The men's kumite +75 kilograms competition at the 2002 Asian Games in Busan was held on 11 October at the Yangsan College Gymnasium.

== Schedule ==
All times are Korea Standard Time (UTC+09:00)

Date	Time	Event
Friday, 11 October 2002	17:30	1st preliminary round
Friday, 11 October 2002	17:30	Quarterfinals
Friday, 11 October 2002	17:30	Semifinals
Friday, 11 October 2002	17:30	1st repechage
Friday, 11 October 2002	17:30	Final repechage
Friday, 11 October 2002	17:30	Final

== Results ==
Legend

- WO — Won by walkover

=== Main bracket ===
1st preliminary round
Hasan Abu Hajar (PLE)	0
Andrey Korolev (KAZ)	2
Lin Huan-wei (TPE)	2
Jaber Al-Hammad (KUW)	6
Babar Iqbal (PAK)	1
Jeong Kwon-hong (KOR)	11
Salauddin Ansari (IND)	8
Mohamed Nifaz Jurampathy (SRI)	0
Souhail Salman (SYR)	3
Isroil Ismoilov (TJK)	5
Younis Al-Aaraj (QAT)	3
Azamat Kalandarov (UZB)	4
Md Sofian Abdullah (BRU)	0
Mehran Behnamfar (IRI)	8
Jo Yong-ho (PRK)	0
Naji Al-Qadasi (YEM)	8

Quarterfinals
Andrey Korolev (KAZ)	7
Jaber Al-Hammad (KUW)	4
Jeong Kwon-hong (KOR)	7
Salauddin Ansari (IND)	2
Isroil Ismoilov (TJK)	3
Azamat Kalandarov (UZB)	2
Mehran Behnamfar (IRI)	5
Naji Al-Qadasi (YEM)	0

Semifinals
Andrey Korolev (KAZ)	7
Jeong Kwon-hong (KOR)	0
Isroil Ismoilov (TJK)	0
Mehran Behnamfar (IRI)	0

Final
Andrey Korolev (KAZ)	0
Mehran Behnamfar (IRI)	0

=== Repechage ===
1st repechage
Hasan Abu Hajar (PLE)
Jaber Al-Hammad (KUW)	WO
Naji Al-Qadasi (YEM)	3
Md Sofian Abdullah (BRU)	1

Final repechage
Jaber Al-Hammad (KUW)	4
Jeong Kwon-hong (KOR)	1
Isroil Ismoilov (TJK)	4
Naji Al-Qadasi (YEM)	1
