= Wrestling at the 2002 Asian Games – Men's Greco-Roman 66 kg =

Men's Greco-Roman 66 kg at the 2002 Asian Games
- Venue: Yangsan Gymnasium
- Date: 2–3 October 2002
- Competitors: 12 from 12 nations

Medalists
gold medal	Kim In-sub	South Korea
silver medal	Daniar Kobonov	Kyrgyzstan
bronze medal	Kim Yun-mo	North Korea

The men's Greco-Roman 66 kilograms wrestling competition at the 2002 Asian Games in Busan was held on 2 October and 3 October at the Yangsan Gymnasium.

The competition held with an elimination system of three or four wrestlers in each pool, with the winners qualify for the semifinals and final by way of direct elimination.

== Schedule ==
All times are Korea Standard Time (UTC+09:00)

Date	Time	Event
Wednesday, 2 October 2002	10:00	Round 1
Wednesday, 2 October 2002	16:00	Round 2
Wednesday, 2 October 2002	16:00	Round 3
Thursday, 3 October 2002	10:00	1/2 finals
Thursday, 3 October 2002	16:00	Finals

== Results ==
Legend

- WO — Won by walkover

=== Preliminary ===
==== Pool 1 ====
Pos	Athlete	Pld	W	L	CP	TP	Qualification
1	Kim In-sub (KOR)	2	2	0	8	24	Knockout round
2	Masaki Imuro (JPN)	2	1	1	4	4	
3	Ali Abdulla (QAT)	2	0	2	1	1	

Source: Report

	Score		CP
Masaki Imuro (JPN)	4–0 Fall	Ali Abdulla (QAT)	4–0 TO
Kim In-sub (KOR)	10–0	Masaki Imuro (JPN)	4–0 ST
Ali Abdulla (QAT)	1–14	Kim In-sub (KOR)	1–4 SP

==== Pool 2 ====
Pos	Athlete	Pld	W	L	CP	TP	Qualification
1	Bakhodir Kurbanov (UZB)	2	2	0	7	7	Knockout round
2	Cui Peng (CHN)	2	1	1	4	5	
3	Gurbinder Singh (IND)	2	0	2	0	0	

Source: Report

	Score		CP
Bakhodir Kurbanov (UZB)	3–1	Cui Peng (CHN)	3–1 PP
Gurbinder Singh (IND)	0–4 Fall	Bakhodir Kurbanov (UZB)	0–4 TO
Cui Peng (CHN)	4–0	Gurbinder Singh (IND)	3–0 PO

==== Pool 3 ====
Pos	Athlete	Pld	W	L	CP	TP	Qualification
1	Kim Yun-mo (PRK)	2	2	0	8	6	Knockout round
2	Yaser Al-Saleh (SYR)	2	1	1	4	6	
3	Mohammed Al-Najjar (PLE)	2	0	2	0	0	

Source: Report

	Score		CP
Mohammed Al-Najjar (PLE)	0–6 Fall	Yaser Al-Saleh (SYR)	0–4 TO
Kim Yun-mo (PRK)	WO	Mohammed Al-Najjar (PLE)	4–0 EV
Yaser Al-Saleh (SYR)	0–6 Ret	Kim Yun-mo (PRK)	0–4 PA

==== Pool 4 ====
Pos	Athlete	Pld	W	L	CP	TP	Qualification
1	Daniar Kobonov (KGZ)	2	2	0	7	7	Knockout round
2	Mkhitar Manukyan (KAZ)	2	1	1	4	4	
3	Mehdi Nassiri (IRI)	2	0	2	1	1	

Source: Report

	Score		CP
Mkhitar Manukyan (KAZ)	2–3	Daniar Kobonov (KGZ)	1–3 PP
Mehdi Nassiri (IRI)	1–2	Mkhitar Manukyan (KAZ)	1–3 PP
Daniar Kobonov (KGZ)	4–0 Fall	Mehdi Nassiri (IRI)	4–0 TO

=== Knockout round ===
1/2 finals
Kim In-sub (KOR)	3
Bakhodir Kurbanov (UZB)	1
Kim Yun-mo (PRK)	0
Daniar Kobonov (KGZ)	3

Final
Kim In-sub (KOR)	3
Daniar Kobonov (KGZ)	1
3rd–4th place
Bakhodir Kurbanov (UZB)	6
Kim Yun-mo (PRK)	7

== Final standing ==
Rank	Athlete
1st place, gold medalist(s)	Kim In-sub (KOR)
2nd place, silver medalist(s)	Daniar Kobonov (KGZ)
3rd place, bronze medalist(s)	Kim Yun-mo (PRK)
4	Bakhodir Kurbanov (UZB)
5	Yaser Al-Saleh (SYR)
6	Masaki Imuro (JPN)
7	Cui Peng (CHN)
8	Mkhitar Manukyan (KAZ)
9	Mehdi Nassiri (IRI)
10	Ali Abdulla (QAT)
11	Mohammed Al-Najjar (PLE)
12	Gurbinder Singh (IND)
