= Karate at the 2002 Asian Games – Men's kumite 65 kg =

Karate competition

Men's kumite 65 kg at the 2002 Asian Games
- Venue: Yangsan College Gymnasium
- Date: 12 October 2002
- Competitors: 16 from 16 nations

Medalists
gold medal	Hasan Basri	Indonesia
silver medal	Mehdi Amouzadeh	Iran
bronze medal	Shao Chih-kang	Chinese Taipei
bronze medal	Nayef Al-Matrouk	Kuwait

The men's kumite 65 kilograms competition at the 2002 Asian Games in Busan was held on 12 October at the Yangsan College Gymnasium.

== Schedule ==
All times are Korea Standard Time (UTC+09:00)

Date	Time	Event
Saturday, 12 October 2002	13:30	1st preliminary round
Saturday, 12 October 2002	13:30	Quarterfinals
Saturday, 12 October 2002	13:30	Semifinals
Saturday, 12 October 2002	13:30	1st repechage
Saturday, 12 October 2002	13:30	Final repechage
Saturday, 12 October 2002	16:30	Final

== Results ==
=== Main bracket ===
1st preliminary round
Mohammed Ismail (QAT)	1
Vũ Quốc Huy (VIE)	8
Kim Yang-il (PRK)	6
Md Fazil Rewandie (BRU)	3
Edgar Edena da Silva (MAC)	3
Shao Chih-kang (TPE)	7
Hasan Basri (INA)	3
Umid Hakimov (UZB)	1
Khamko Heuangmany (LAO)	2
Mehdi Amouzadeh (IRI)	10
Sambar Bahadur Gole (NEP)	0
Orienfari Mastonzoda (TJK)	2
Fakhruddin Abdulmajid (UAE)	4
Rauan Rakhmankulov (KAZ)	0
Nayef Al-Matrouk (KUW)	9
Junel Perania (PHI)	1

Quarterfinals
Vũ Quốc Huy (VIE)	9
Kim Yang-il (PRK)	1
Shao Chih-kang (TPE)	2
Hasan Basri (INA)	8
Mehdi Amouzadeh (IRI)	7
Orienfari Mastonzoda (TJK)	5
Fakhruddin Abdulmajid (UAE)	1
Nayef Al-Matrouk (KUW)	2

Semifinals
Vũ Quốc Huy (VIE)	2
Hasan Basri (INA)	2
Mehdi Amouzadeh (IRI)	2
Nayef Al-Matrouk (KUW)	0

Final
Hasan Basri (INA)	3
Mehdi Amouzadeh (IRI)	1

=== Repechage ===
1st repechage
Umid Hakimov (UZB)	2
Shao Chih-kang (TPE)	5
Orienfari Mastonzoda (TJK)	8
Khamko Heuangmany (LAO)	0

Final repechage
Shao Chih-kang (TPE)	14
Vũ Quốc Huy (VIE)	6
Nayef Al-Matrouk (KUW)	5
Orienfari Mastonzoda (TJK)	0
