= Judo at the 2002 Asian Games – Men's 100 kg =

Judo competition

Men's 100 kg at the 2002 Asian Games
- Venue: Gudeok Gymnasium
- Date: 30 September 2002
- Competitors: 9 from 9 nations

Medalists
| gold medal | Keiji Suzuki | Japan |
| silver medal | Jang Sung-ho | South Korea |
| bronze medal | Abbas Fallah | Iran |
| bronze medal | Askhat Zhitkeyev | Kazakhstan |

The men's 100 kilograms (Half heavyweight) competition at the 2002 Asian Games in Busan was held on 30 September at the Gudeok Gymnasium.

== Schedule ==
All times are Korea Standard Time (UTC+09:00)

| Date | Time | Event |
|---|---|---|
| Monday, 30 September 2002 | 14:00 | 1 round |
| Monday, 30 September 2002 | 14:00 | 2 round |
| Monday, 30 September 2002 | 14:00 | Repechage 1 round |
| Monday, 30 September 2002 | 14:00 | Repechage 2 round |
| Monday, 30 September 2002 | 14:00 | Semifinals |
| Monday, 30 September 2002 | 18:00 | Finals |

== Results ==
Legend

- WO — Won by walkover

=== Main bracket ===
1 round
Mikhail Sokolov (UZB) | 0000
Keiji Suzuki (JPN) | 1000

2 round
Keiji Suzuki (JPN) | 1100
Abbas Fallah (IRI) | 0001
Elie Saade (LIB)
Askhat Zhitkeyev (KAZ) | WO
Khemkham Kommanivong (LAO) | 0010
Muradillo Khidirov (TJK) | 1110
Jang Sung-ho (KOR) | 1000
Makhgalyn Bayarjavkhlan (MGL) | 0010

Semifinals
Keiji Suzuki (JPN) | 0101
Askhat Zhitkeyev (KAZ) | 0010
Muradillo Khidirov (TJK) | 0010
Jang Sung-ho (KOR) | 1000

Final
Keiji Suzuki (JPN) | 0001
Jang Sung-ho (KOR) | 0001

=== Repechage ===
Repechage 1 round
Mikhail Sokolov (UZB) | 0001
Abbas Fallah (IRI) | 1001

Repechage 2 round
Abbas Fallah (IRI) | WO
Elie Saade (LIB)
Khemkham Kommanivong (LAO) | 0000
Makhgalyn Bayarjavkhlan (MGL) | 1020

Bronze medal match
Abbas Fallah (IRI) | 1141
Muradillo Khidirov (TJK) | 0000
Makhgalyn Bayarjavkhlan (MGL) | 0000
Askhat Zhitkeyev (KAZ) | 1000
