= Wrestling at the 2002 Asian Games – Men's freestyle 60 kg =

Men's freestyle 60 kg at the 2002 Asian Games
- Venue: Yangsan Gymnasium
- Date: 7–8 October 2002
- Competitors: 14 from 14 nations

Medalists
| gold medal | Oyuunbilegiin Pürevbaatar | Mongolia |
| silver medal | Song Jae-myung | South Korea |
| bronze medal | Ulan Nadyrbek Uulu | Kyrgyzstan |

The men's freestyle 60 kilograms wrestling competition at the 2002 Asian Games in Busan was held on 7 October and 8 October at the Yangsan Gymnasium.

The competition held with an elimination system of three or four wrestlers in each pool, with the winners qualify for the semifinals and final by way of direct elimination.

== Schedule ==
All times are Korea Standard Time (UTC+09:00)

| Date | Time | Event |
|---|---|---|
| Monday, 7 October 2002 | 10:00 | Round 1 |
| Monday, 7 October 2002 | 10:00 | Round 2 |
| Tuesday, 8 October 2002 | 10:00 | Round 3 |
| Tuesday, 8 October 2002 | 10:00 | 1/2 finals |
| Tuesday, 8 October 2002 | 16:00 | Finals |

== Results ==
Legend

- F — Won by fall
- WO — Won by walkover

=== Preliminary ===
==== Pool 1 ====
| Pos | Athlete | Pld | W | L | CP | TP | Qualification |
|---|---|---|---|---|---|---|---|
| 1 | Shokinder Tomar (IND) | 2 | 2 | 0 | 7 | 20 | Knockout round |
| 2 | Đới Đăng Hỷ (VIE) | 2 | 1 | 1 | 5 | 17 | |
| 3 | Mohammad Nader Mir (AFG) | 2 | 0 | 2 | 0 | 0 | |

Source: Report

| | Score | | CP |
|---|---|---|---|
| Đới Đăng Hỷ (VIE) | 11–0 | Mohammad Nader Mir (AFG) | 4–0 ST |
| Shokinder Tomar (IND) | 9–6 | Đới Đăng Hỷ (VIE) | 3–1 PP |
| Mohammad Nader Mir (AFG) | 0–11 | Shokinder Tomar (IND) | 0–4 ST |

==== Pool 2 ====
| Pos | Athlete | Pld | W | L | CP | TP | Qualification |
|---|---|---|---|---|---|---|---|
| 1 | Oyuunbilegiin Pürevbaatar (MGL) | 2 | 2 | 0 | 8 | 21 | Knockout round |
| 2 | Jimmy Angana (PHI) | 2 | 1 | 1 | 5 | 13 | |
| 3 | Anisur Rahman (BAN) | 2 | 0 | 2 | 1 | 1 | |

Source: Report

| | Score | | CP |
|---|---|---|---|
| Jimmy Angana (PHI) | 1–11 | Oyuunbilegiin Pürevbaatar (MGL) | 1–4 SP |
| Anisur Rahman (BAN) | 1–12 | Jimmy Angana (PHI) | 1–4 SP |
| Oyuunbilegiin Pürevbaatar (MGL) | 10–0 Fall | Anisur Rahman (BAN) | 4–0 TO |

==== Pool 3 ====
| Pos | Athlete | Pld | W | L | CP | TP | Qualification |
|---|---|---|---|---|---|---|---|
| 1 | Ulan Nadyrbek Uulu (KGZ) | 3 | 3 | 0 | 12 | 11 | Knockout round |
| 2 | Masoud Mostafa-Jokar (IRI) | 3 | 2 | 1 | 8 | 7 | |
| 3 | Mohammed Siddiq (QAT) | 3 | 1 | 2 | 4 | 0 | |
| 4 | Ri Yong-chol (PRK) | 3 | 0 | 3 | 0 | 2 | |

Source: Report

| | Score | | CP |
|---|---|---|---|
| Ulan Nadyrbek Uulu (KGZ) | 11–0 | Mohammed Siddiq (QAT) | 4–0 ST |
| Masoud Mostafa-Jokar (IRI) | 7–2 Fall | Ri Yong-chol (PRK) | 4–0 TO |
| Ulan Nadyrbek Uulu (KGZ) | WO | Masoud Mostafa-Jokar (IRI) | 4–0 EF |
| Mohammed Siddiq (QAT) | WO | Ri Yong-chol (PRK) | 4–0 EF |
| Ulan Nadyrbek Uulu (KGZ) | WO | Ri Yong-chol (PRK) | 4–0 PA |
| Mohammed Siddiq (QAT) | WO | Masoud Mostafa-Jokar (IRI) | 0–4 PA |

==== Pool 4 ====
| Pos | Athlete | Pld | W | L | CP | TP | Qualification |
|---|---|---|---|---|---|---|---|
| 1 | Song Jae-myung (KOR) | 3 | 3 | 0 | 10 | 8 | Knockout round |
| 2 | Damir Zakhartdinov (UZB) | 3 | 2 | 1 | 8 | 17 | |
| 3 | Ryosuke Ota (JPN) | 3 | 1 | 2 | 5 | 6 | |
| 4 | Mars Yernazarov (KAZ) | 3 | 0 | 3 | 1 | 2 | |

Source: Report

| | Score | | CP |
|---|---|---|---|
| Mars Yernazarov (KAZ) | 2–3 | Ryosuke Ota (JPN) | 1–3 PP |
| Song Jae-myung (KOR) | 5–1 | Damir Zakhartdinov (UZB) | 3–1 PP |
| Mars Yernazarov (KAZ) | WO | Song Jae-myung (KOR) | 0–4 PA |
| Ryosuke Ota (JPN) | 1–11 | Damir Zakhartdinov (UZB) | 1–4 SP |
| Mars Yernazarov (KAZ) | 0–5 | Damir Zakhartdinov (UZB) | 0–3 PO |
| Ryosuke Ota (JPN) | 2–3 | Song Jae-myung (KOR) | 1–3 PP |

=== Knockout round ===
1/2 finals
Shokinder Tomar (IND) | 1
Oyuunbilegiin Pürevbaatar (MGL) | 7
Ulan Nadyrbek Uulu (KGZ) | 0
Song Jae-myung (KOR) | 3

Final
Oyuunbilegiin Pürevbaatar (MGL) | 6
Song Jae-myung (KOR) | 1
3rd–4th place
Shokinder Tomar (IND) | 1
Ulan Nadyrbek Uulu (KGZ) | 4^{F}

== Final standing ==
| Rank | Athlete |
|---|---|
| 1st place, gold medalist(s) | Oyuunbilegiin Pürevbaatar (MGL) |
| 2nd place, silver medalist(s) | Song Jae-myung (KOR) |
| 3rd place, bronze medalist(s) | Ulan Nadyrbek Uulu (KGZ) |
| 4 | Shokinder Tomar (IND) |
| 5 | Damir Zakhartdinov (UZB) |
| 6 | Masoud Mostafa-Jokar (IRI) |
| 7 | Đới Đăng Hỷ (VIE) |
| 8 | Jimmy Angana (PHI) |
| 9 | Ryosuke Ota (JPN) |
| 10 | Mohammed Siddiq (QAT) |
| 11 | Mars Yernazarov (KAZ) |
| 12 | Anisur Rahman (BAN) |
| 13 | Ri Yong-chol (PRK) |
| 14 | Mohammad Nader Mir (AFG) |
