= Judo at the 2002 Asian Games – Men's openweight =

Judo competition

Men's openweight at the 2002 Asian Games
- Venue: Gudeok Gymnasium
- Date: 3 October 2002
- Competitors: 8 from 8 nations

Medalists
gold medal	Kosei Inoue	Japan
silver medal	Abdullo Tangriev	Uzbekistan
bronze medal	Mahmoud Miran	Iran
bronze medal	Liu Shenggang	China

The men's openweight competition at the 2002 Asian Games in Busan was held on 3 October at the Gudeok Gymnasium.

== Schedule ==
All times are Korea Standard Time (UTC+09:00)

Date	Time	Event
Thursday, 3 October 2002	14:00	1 round
Thursday, 3 October 2002	14:00	2 round
Thursday, 3 October 2002	14:00	Repechage 1 round
Thursday, 3 October 2002	14:00	Repechage 2 round
Thursday, 3 October 2002	14:00	Semifinals
Thursday, 3 October 2002	18:00	Finals

== Results ==
Legend

- WO — Won by walkover

=== Main bracket ===
1 round
Kosei Inoue (JPN)	1000
Yeldos Ikhsangaliyev (KAZ)	0000

2 round
Jang Sung-ho (KOR)	1000
Majid Al-Ali (KUW)	0000
Yan Naing Soe (MYA)	0000
Kosei Inoue (JPN)	1000
Liu Shenggang (CHN)	0010
Mahmoud Miran (IRI)	1001
Abdullo Tangriev (UZB)
Bye

Semifinals
Jang Sung-ho (KOR)	0001
Kosei Inoue (JPN)	1001
Mahmoud Miran (IRI)	0011
Abdullo Tangriev (UZB)	1000

Final
Kosei Inoue (JPN)	1010
Abdullo Tangriev (UZB)	0000

=== Repechage ===
Repechage 1 round
Yeldos Ikhsangaliyev (KAZ)	WO
Yan Naing Soe (MYA)

Repechage 2 round
Majid Al-Ali (KUW)	0000
Yeldos Ikhsangaliyev (KAZ)	0100
Liu Shenggang (CHN)
Bye

Bronze medal match
Yeldos Ikhsangaliyev (KAZ)	0100
Mahmoud Miran (IRI)	1010
Liu Shenggang (CHN)	0100
Jang Sung-ho (KOR)	0031
