= Judo at the 2002 Asian Games – Men's 66 kg =

Judo competition

Men's 66 kg at the 2002 Asian Games
- Venue: Gudeok Gymnasium
- Date: 2 October 2002
- Competitors: 18 from 18 nations

Medalists
gold medal	Kim Hyung-ju	South Korea
silver medal	Guwanç Nurmuhammedow	Turkmenistan
bronze medal	Gantömöriin Dashdavaa	Mongolia
bronze medal	Michihiro Omigawa	Japan

The men's 66 kilograms (Half lightweight) competition at the 2002 Asian Games in Busan was held on 2 October at the Gudeok Gymnasium.

== Schedule ==
All times are Korea Standard Time (UTC+09:00)

Date	Time	Event
Wednesday, 2 October 2002	14:00	1 round
Wednesday, 2 October 2002	14:00	2 round
Wednesday, 2 October 2002	14:00	3 round
Wednesday, 2 October 2002	14:00	Repechage 1 round
Wednesday, 2 October 2002	14:00	Repechage 2 round
Wednesday, 2 October 2002	14:00	Repechage 3 round
Wednesday, 2 October 2002	14:00	Semifinals
Wednesday, 2 October 2002	18:00	Finals

== Results ==
=== Main bracket ===
==== Final ====
Final
Kim Hyung-ju (KOR)	1000
Guwanç Nurmuhammedow (TKM)	0000

==== Top half ====
1 round
Yerlan Slyambayev (KAZ)	1003
Aristotle Lucero (PHI)	0000

2 round
Michihiro Omigawa (JPN)	1000
Tam Kai Cheung (HKG)	0000
Sami Al-Bachir (QAT)	0000
Yerlan Slyambayev (KAZ)	1020
Chen Chih-hung (TPE)	0000
Kim Hyung-ju (KOR)	1000
Mohan Sunuwar (NEP)	0001
Muhammad Zeeshan Butt (PAK)	1000

3 round
Michihiro Omigawa (JPN)	1001
Yerlan Slyambayev (KAZ)	0000
Kim Hyung-ju (KOR)	1011
Muhammad Zeeshan Butt (PAK)	0000

Semifinals
Michihiro Omigawa (JPN)	0000
Kim Hyung-ju (KOR)	0011

==== Bottom half ====
1 round
Gantömöriin Dashdavaa (MGL)	1000
Susantha Kumara (SRI)	0000

2 round
Sergey Petryanin (UZB)	0010
Arash Miresmaeili (IRI)	0021
Bhupinder Singh (IND)	0000
Guwanç Nurmuhammedow (TKM)	1000
Aidyn Smagulov (KGZ)	1100
Yasir Ayyad (KSA)	0000
Anwar Al-Dhafiri (YEM)	0001
Gantömöriin Dashdavaa (MGL)	1001

3 round
Arash Miresmaeili (IRI)	0001
Guwanç Nurmuhammedow (TKM)	1011
Aidyn Smagulov (KGZ)	0010
Gantömöriin Dashdavaa (MGL)	0101

Semifinals
Guwanç Nurmuhammedow (TKM)	0011
Gantömöriin Dashdavaa (MGL)	0001

=== Repechage ===
Repechage 1 round
Susantha Kumara (SRI)	0001
Anwar Al-Dhafiri (YEM)	1010

Repechage 2 round
Tam Kai Cheung (HKG)	0000
Yerlan Slyambayev (KAZ)	1001
Chen Chih-hung (TPE)	1100
Muhammad Zeeshan Butt (PAK)	0100
Bhupinder Singh (IND)	0001
Arash Miresmaeili (IRI)	0010
Anwar Al-Dhafiri (YEM)	0000
Aidyn Smagulov (KGZ)	1000

Repechage 3 round
Yerlan Slyambayev (KAZ)	1111
Chen Chih-hung (TPE)	0000
Arash Miresmaeili (IRI)	0010
Aidyn Smagulov (KGZ)	1021

Bronze medal match
Yerlan Slyambayev (KAZ)	0010
Gantömöriin Dashdavaa (MGL)	0021
Aidyn Smagulov (KGZ)	0000
Michihiro Omigawa (JPN)	1000
