= Taekwondo at the 2002 Asian Games – Men's +84 kg =

Taekwondo competition

Men's +84 kg at the 2002 Asian Games
- Venue: Gudeok Gymnasium
- Date: 13 October 2002
- Competitors: 12 from 12 nations

Medalists
gold medal	Moon Dae-sung	South Korea
silver medal	Nguyễn Văn Hùng	Vietnam
bronze medal	Abdulqader Al-Adhami	Qatar
bronze medal	Ahmad Al-Attar	Kuwait

The men's middleweight (+84 kilograms) event at the 2002 Asian Games took place on 13 October 2002 at Gudeok Gymnasium, Busan, South Korea.

A total of twelve competitors from twelve countries competed in this event, limited to fighters whose body weight was more than 84 kilograms.

Moon Dae-sung of South Korea won the gold medal.

== Schedule ==
All times are Korea Standard Time (UTC+09:00)

Date	Time	Event
Sunday, 13 October 2002	14:00	Round 1
Sunday, 13 October 2002	14:00	Round 2
Sunday, 13 October 2002	14:00	Semifinals
Sunday, 13 October 2002	19:50	Final

== Results ==
Legend

- P — Won by punitive declaration

Round 1
Nguyễn Văn Hùng (VIE)	7
Kuenzang Thinley (BHU)	0
Hadi Afshar (IRI)	6
Lu Chun-chia (TPE)	4
Zhu Feng (CHN)	3
Moon Dae-sung (KOR)	6
Muhammad Hanif (PAK)	1
Byaşim Rozyýew (TKM)	4

Round 2
Adilkhan Sagindykov (KAZ)	4
Nguyễn Văn Hùng (VIE)	6
Hadi Afshar (IRI)	6
Abdulqader Al-Adhami (QAT)	10
Khaled Al-Dosari (KSA)	1
Moon Dae-sung (KOR)	7
Byaşim Rozyýew (TKM)	5
Ahmad Al-Attar (KUW)	6

Semifinals
Nguyễn Văn Hùng (VIE)	7
Abdulqader Al-Adhami (QAT)	6
Moon Dae-sung (KOR)	3^{P}
Ahmad Al-Attar (KUW)	0

Final
Nguyễn Văn Hùng (VIE)	5
Moon Dae-sung (KOR)	10
