= Wrestling at the 2002 Asian Games – Men's freestyle 66 kg =

Men's freestyle 66 kg at the 2002 Asian Games
- Venue: Yangsan Gymnasium
- Date: 6–7 October 2002
- Competitors: 16 from 16 nations

Medalists
gold medal	Baek Jin-kuk	South Korea
silver medal	Alireza Dabir	Iran
bronze medal	Norjingiin Bayarmagnai	Mongolia

The men's freestyle 66 kilograms wrestling competition at the 2002 Asian Games in Busan was held on 6 October and 7 October at the Yangsan Gymnasium.

The competition held with an elimination system of three or four wrestlers in each pool, with the winners qualify for the quarterfinals, semifinals and final by way of direct elimination.

== Schedule ==
All times are Korea Standard Time (UTC+09:00)

Date	Time	Event
Sunday, 6 October 2002	10:00	Round 1
Sunday, 6 October 2002	10:00	Round 2
Sunday, 6 October 2002	16:00	Round 3
Sunday, 6 October 2002	16:00	1/4 finals
Monday, 7 October 2002	10:00	1/2 finals
Monday, 7 October 2002	16:00	Finals

== Results ==
Legend

- WO — Won by walkover

=== Preliminary ===
==== Pool 1 ====
Pos	Athlete	Pld	W	L	CP	TP	Qualification
1	Pawan Kumar (IND)	2	2	0	6	11	Knockout round
2	Alai Niýazmengliýew (TKM)	2	1	1	4	6	
3	Ci Liang (CHN)	2	0	2	1	3	

Source: Report

	Score		CP
Pawan Kumar (IND)	5–2	Alai Niýazmengliýew (TKM)	3–1 PP
Ci Liang (CHN)	3–6	Pawan Kumar (IND)	1–3 PP
Alai Niýazmengliýew (TKM)	4–0	Ci Liang (CHN)	3–0 PO

==== Pool 2 ====
Pos	Athlete	Pld	W	L	CP	TP	Qualification
1	Hwang Po-song (PRK)	2	1	1	5	14	Knockout round
2	Jamso Lkhamajapov (KGZ)	2	1	1	4	6	
3	Kazuhiko Ikematsu (JPN)	2	1	1	3	4	

Source: Report

	Score		CP
Hwang Po-song (PRK)	10–0	Kazuhiko Ikematsu (JPN)	4–0 ST
Jamso Lkhamajapov (KGZ)	5–4	Hwang Po-song (PRK)	3–1 PP
Kazuhiko Ikematsu (JPN)	4–1	Jamso Lkhamajapov (KGZ)	3–1 PP

==== Pool 3 ====
Pos	Athlete	Pld	W	L	CP	TP	Qualification
1	Baek Jin-kuk (KOR)	2	2	0	7	21	Knockout round
2	Sabit Kendybayev (KAZ)	2	1	1	3	9	
3	Mazen Kadmani (SYR)	2	0	2	1	4	

Source: Report

	Score		CP
Mazen Kadmani (SYR)	0–12	Baek Jin-kuk (KOR)	0–4 ST
Sabit Kendybayev (KAZ)	9–4	Mazen Kadmani (SYR)	3–1 PP
Baek Jin-kuk (KOR)	9–0	Sabit Kendybayev (KAZ)	3–0 PO

==== Pool 4 ====
Pos	Athlete	Pld	W	L	CP	TP	Qualification
1	Alireza Dabir (IRI)	2	2	0	8	21	Knockout round
2	Papoo Pehlwan (PAK)	2	1	1	4	11	
3	Jalal Mohammed (QAT)	2	0	2	0	0	

Source: Report

	Score		CP
Alireza Dabir (IRI)	10–0	Jalal Mohammed (QAT)	4–0 ST
Papoo Pehlwan (PAK)	0–11	Alireza Dabir (IRI)	0–4 ST
Jalal Mohammed (QAT)	0–11	Papoo Pehlwan (PAK)	0–4 ST

==== Pool 5 ====
Pos	Athlete	Pld	W	L	CP	TP	Qualification
1	Norjingiin Bayarmagnai (MGL)	3	3	0	10	11	Knockout round
2	Mirdad Mir (AFG)	3	2	1	7	12	
3	Eradj Davlatov (TJK)	3	1	2	6	14	
4	Kamal Hossain (BAN)	3	0	3	0	0	

Source: Report

	Score		CP
Mirdad Mir (AFG)	0–8	Norjingiin Bayarmagnai (MGL)	0–3 PO
Kamal Hossain (BAN)	0–10	Eradj Davlatov (TJK)	0–4 ST
Mirdad Mir (AFG)	9–0 Fall	Kamal Hossain (BAN)	4–0 TO
Norjingiin Bayarmagnai (MGL)	3–2	Eradj Davlatov (TJK)	3–1 PP
Mirdad Mir (AFG)	3–2	Eradj Davlatov (TJK)	3–1 PP
Norjingiin Bayarmagnai (MGL)	WO	Kamal Hossain (BAN)	4–0 PA

=== Knockout round ===
1/4 finals
Pawan Kumar (IND)	4
Hwang Po-song (PRK)	5

1/2 finals
Hwang Po-song (PRK)	0
Baek Jin-kuk (KOR)	7
Alireza Dabir (IRI)	3
Norjingiin Bayarmagnai (MGL)	2

Final
Baek Jin-kuk (KOR)	3
Alireza Dabir (IRI)	1
3rd–4th place
Hwang Po-song (PRK)	2
Norjingiin Bayarmagnai (MGL)	5

== Final standing ==
Rank	Athlete
1st place, gold medalist(s)	Baek Jin-kuk (KOR)
2nd place, silver medalist(s)	Alireza Dabir (IRI)
3rd place, bronze medalist(s)	Norjingiin Bayarmagnai (MGL)
4	Hwang Po-song (PRK)
5	Pawan Kumar (IND)
6	Mirdad Mir (AFG)
7	Eradj Davlatov (TJK)
8	Papoo Pehlwan (PAK)
9	Alai Niýazmengliýew (TKM)
10	Jamso Lkhamajapov (KGZ)
11	Sabit Kendybayev (KAZ)
12	Kazuhiko Ikematsu (JPN)
13	Mazen Kadmani (SYR)
14	Ci Liang (CHN)
15	Kamal Hossain (BAN)
16	Jalal Mohammed (QAT)
