= Wrestling at the 2002 Asian Games – Men's Greco-Roman 84 kg =

Men's Greco-Roman 84 kg at the 2002 Asian Games
- Venue: Yangsan Gymnasium
- Date: 2–3 October 2002
- Competitors: 11 from 11 nations

Medalists
gold medal	Shingo Matsumoto	Japan
silver medal	Kim Jung-sub	South Korea
bronze medal	Mohammad Al-Ken	Syria

The men's Greco-Roman 84 kilograms wrestling competition at the 2002 Asian Games in Busan was held on 2 October and 3 October at the Yangsan Gymnasium.

The competition held with an elimination system of three or four wrestlers in each pool, with the winners qualify for the semifinals and final by way of direct elimination.

== Schedule ==
All times are Korea Standard Time (UTC+09:00)

Date	Time	Event
Wednesday, 2 October 2002	10:00	Round 1
Wednesday, 2 October 2002	16:00	Round 2
Wednesday, 2 October 2002	16:00	Round 3
Wednesday, 2 October 2002	16:00	Repechage 1
Wednesday, 2 October 2002	16:00	Repechage 2
Thursday, 3 October 2002	10:00	Repechage 3
Thursday, 3 October 2002	10:00	1/2 finals
Thursday, 3 October 2002	16:00	Finals

== Results ==
=== Preliminary ===
==== Pool 1 ====
Pos	Athlete	Pld	W	L	CP	TP	Qualification
1	Shingo Matsumoto (JPN)	2	2	0	7	15	Knockout round
2	Mohammad Al-Ken (SYR)	2	1	1	4	8	Repechage
3	Surinder Singh (IND)	2	0	2	1	1	

Source: Report

	Score		CP
Mohammad Al-Ken (SYR)	1–4	Shingo Matsumoto (JPN)	1–3 PP
Surinder Singh (IND)	1–7	Mohammad Al-Ken (SYR)	1–3 PP
Shingo Matsumoto (JPN)	11–0 Fall	Surinder Singh (IND)	4–0 TO

==== Pool 2 ====
Pos	Athlete	Pld	W	L	CP	TP	Qualification
1	Evgeniy Erofaylov (UZB)	3	3	0	10	15	Knockout round
2	Asset Mambetov (KAZ)	3	2	1	7	16	Repechage
3	Majid Ramezani (IRI)	3	1	2	5	9	
4	Hassan Al-Araj (JOR)	3	0	3	2	4	

Source: Report

	Score		CP
Evgeniy Erofaylov (UZB)	7–1	Majid Ramezani (IRI)	3–1 PP
Asset Mambetov (KAZ)	9–3	Hassan Al-Araj (JOR)	3–1 PP
Evgeniy Erofaylov (UZB)	3–1	Asset Mambetov (KAZ)	3–1 PP
Majid Ramezani (IRI)	6–1	Hassan Al-Araj (JOR)	3–1 PP
Evgeniy Erofaylov (UZB)	5–0 Fall	Hassan Al-Araj (JOR)	4–0 TO
Majid Ramezani (IRI)	2–6	Asset Mambetov (KAZ)	1–3 PP

==== Pool 3 ====
Pos	Athlete	Pld	W	L	CP	TP	Qualification
1	Kim Jung-sub (KOR)	3	3	0	12	36	Knockout round
2	Azamat Erkimbaev (KGZ)	3	2	1	7	17	Repechage
3	Li Junmin (CHN)	3	1	2	5	9	
4	Mohammad Ashraf Timori (AFG)	3	0	3	0	0	

Source: Report

	Score		CP
Azamat Erkimbaev (KGZ)	0–10	Kim Jung-sub (KOR)	0–4 ST
Mohammad Ashraf Timori (AFG)	0–4 Fall	Li Junmin (CHN)	0–4 TO
Azamat Erkimbaev (KGZ)	6–0 Fall	Mohammad Ashraf Timori (AFG)	4–0 TO
Kim Jung-sub (KOR)	11–0	Li Junmin (CHN)	4–0 ST
Azamat Erkimbaev (KGZ)	11–5	Li Junmin (CHN)	3–1 PP
Kim Jung-sub (KOR)	15–0	Mohammad Ashraf Timori (AFG)	4–0 ST

=== Repechage ===
Pos	Athlete	Pld	W	L	CP	TP	Qualification
1	Mohammad Al-Ken (SYR)	2	2	0	6	7	Knockout round
2	Asset Mambetov (KAZ)	2	1	1	5	12	
3	Azamat Erkimbaev (KGZ)	2	0	2	1	1	

Source: Report

	Score		CP
Mohammad Al-Ken (SYR)	3–1	Asset Mambetov (KAZ)	3–1 PP
Azamat Erkimbaev (KGZ)	1–4	Mohammad Al-Ken (SYR)	1–3 PP
Asset Mambetov (KAZ)	11–0	Azamat Erkimbaev (KGZ)	4–0 ST

=== Knockout round ===
1/2 finals
Shingo Matsumoto (JPN)	3
Evgeniy Erofaylov (UZB)	1
Kim Jung-sub (KOR)	6
Mohammad Al-Ken (SYR)	0

Final
Shingo Matsumoto (JPN)	4
Kim Jung-sub (KOR)	3
3rd–4th place
Evgeniy Erofaylov (UZB)	3
Mohammad Al-Ken (SYR)	5

== Final standing ==
Rank	Athlete
1st place, gold medalist(s)	Shingo Matsumoto (JPN)
2nd place, silver medalist(s)	Kim Jung-sub (KOR)
3rd place, bronze medalist(s)	Mohammad Al-Ken (SYR)
4	Evgeniy Erofaylov (UZB)
5	Asset Mambetov (KAZ)
6	Azamat Erkimbaev (KGZ)
7	Li Junmin (CHN)
8	Majid Ramezani (IRI)
9	Hassan Al-Araj (JOR)
10	Surinder Singh (IND)
11	Mohammad Ashraf Timori (AFG)
