= Shooting at the 2002 Asian Games – Women's 25 metre pistol =

Women's 25 metre pistol at the 2002 Asian Games
- Venue: Changwon International Shooting Range
- Dates: 4 October 2002
- Competitors: 29 from 12 nations

Medalists
gold medal	Chen Ying	China
silver medal	Tao Luna	China
bronze medal	Otryadyn Gündegmaa	Mongolia

The women's 25 metre pistol competition at the 2002 Asian Games in Busan, South Korea was held on 4 October at the Changwon International Shooting Range.

== Schedule ==
All times are Korea Standard Time (UTC+09:00)

Date	Time	Event
Friday, 4 October 2002	09:00	Qualification
Friday, 4 October 2002	15:00	Final

== Records ==
Prior to this competition, the existing world, Asian and Games records were as follows.

Qualification
World Record	Diana Iorgova (BUL)	594	Milan, Italy	31 May 1994
Asian Record	Tao Luna (CHN)	594	Munich, Germany	23 August 2002
Games Record	Li Duihong (CHN)	589	Beijing, China	25 September 1990
Final
World Record	Diana Iorgova (BUL)	696.2	Milan, Italy	31 May 1994
Asian Record	Tao Luna (CHN)	695.5	Munich, Germany	23 August 2002
Games Record	Cai Yeqing (CHN)	685.3	Bangkok, Thailand	11 December 1998

== Results ==
=== Qualification ===
Rank	Athlete	Precision			Rapid			Total	Notes
Rank	Athlete	1	2	3	1	2	3	Total	Notes
1	Chen Ying (CHN)	96	99	97	100	100	100	592	GR
2	Tao Luna (CHN)	99	100	99	97	99	95	589	
3	Li Duihong (CHN)	96	99	100	97	97	98	587	
4	Otryadyn Gündegmaa (MGL)	93	97	95	100	100	98	583	
5	Galina Belyayeva (KAZ)	100	96	96	96	97	98	583	
6	Yuliya Bondareva (KAZ)	98	96	96	98	98	97	583	
7	Yukari Konishi (JPN)	92	99	98	95	98	99	581	
8	Tsogbadrakhyn Mönkhzul (MGL)	93	97	96	98	97	98	579	
9	Michiko Fukushima (JPN)	98	93	100	95	95	98	579	
9	Zabida Yrsalieva (KGZ)	97	97	94	96	98	97	579	
9	Yuki Yoshida (JPN)	96	96	97	97	97	96	579	
12	Ko Jin-sook (KOR)	97	95	93	97	95	100	577	
12	Gang Eun-ra (KOR)	95	98	96	96	95	97	577	
14	Choi Kum-ran (KOR)	93	97	98	94	96	97	575	
15	Kang Un-byol (PRK)	95	96	95	97	98	93	574	
15	Kim Hye-song (PRK)	98	99	96	95	94	92	574	
17	Suraye Dzhumaeva (TJK)	97	96	98	90	93	98	572	
18	Zauresh Baibussinova (KAZ)	95	93	97	94	96	96	571	
18	Chan Pou Pou (MAC)	95	97	97	94	92	96	571	
20	Pak Hye-gyong (PRK)	95	94	96	93	95	95	568	
21	Davaajantsangiin Oyuun (MGL)	91	94	94	95	96	94	564	
22	Shamma Al-Muhairi (UAE)	94	93	92	92	96	95	562	
23	Sumaya Mubarak (UAE)	95	94	93	97	91	90	560	
24	Therese Cantada (PHI)	92	90	91	95	93	94	555	
25	Fatima Al-Booki (UAE)	94	92	90	96	89	92	553	
26	Banu Hijazi (QAT)	93	89	91	89	86	94	542	
27	Lam Hoi Ing (MAC)	92	86	87	92	94	85	536	
28	Hissa Al-Asiri (QAT)	76	78	88	89	95	88	514	
29	Bahiya Jabir (QAT)	81	82	81	85	78	85	492	

=== Final ===
Rank	Athlete	Qual.	Final											Total	S-off	Notes
Rank	Athlete	Qual.	1	2	3	4	5	6	7	8	9	10	Total	Total	S-off	Notes
1st place, gold medalist(s)	Chen Ying (CHN)	592	10.0	10.7	10.3	10.5	10.2	9.8	10.8	8.6	10.5	10.2	101.6	693.6		GR
2nd place, silver medalist(s)	Tao Luna (CHN)	589	10.3	10.0	10.4	9.3	10.0	10.3	10.8	10.2	10.2	10.4	101.9	690.9		
3rd place, bronze medalist(s)	Otryadyn Gündegmaa (MGL)	583	9.9	10.5	10.2	9.7	10.8	10.7	10.3	10.6	10.7	10.3	103.7	686.7		
4	Li Duihong (CHN)	587	9.0	10.2	8.9	9.9	9.2	10.5	9.7	9.9	10.5	10.4	98.2	685.2		
5	Yuliya Bondareva (KAZ)	583	9.5	9.4	9.1	9.4	9.2	10.1	10.3	10.5	10.0	10.2	97.7	680.7		
6	Galina Belyayeva (KAZ)	583	10.0	10.3	9.9	10.0	10.2	6.4	10.1	10.1	9.6	10.1	96.7	679.7		
7	Tsogbadrakhyn Mönkhzul (MGL)	579	10.5	10.4	10.1	10.0	10.4	9.1	9.3	9.3	9.9	10.0	99.0	678.0		
8	Yukari Konishi (JPN)	581	10.3	10.0	9.1	9.0	7.9	10.9	9.7	9.2	10.1	10.7	96.9	677.9		
