= Taekwondo at the 2002 Asian Games – Men's 78 kg =

Taekwondo competition

Men's 78 kg at the 2002 Asian Games
- Venue: Gudeok Gymnasium
- Date: 11 October 2002
- Competitors: 14 from 14 nations

Medalists
gold medal	Oh Seon-taek	South Korea
silver medal	Đinh Vương Duy	Vietnam
bronze medal	Majid Aflaki	Iran
bronze medal	Liu Yang	China

The men's welterweight (−78 kilograms) event at the 2002 Asian Games took place on 11 October 2002 at Gudeok Gymnasium, Busan, South Korea.

A total of 14 men from 14 countries competed in this event, limited to fighters whose body weight was less than 78 kilograms. Oh Seon-taek of South Korea won the gold medal.

== Schedule ==
All times are Korea Standard Time (UTC+09:00)

Date	Time	Event
Friday, 11 October 2002	14:00	Round 1
Friday, 11 October 2002	14:00	Round 2
Friday, 11 October 2002	14:00	Semifinals
Friday, 11 October 2002	19:50	Final

== Results ==
Legend

- DQ — Won by disqualification
- K — Won by knockout
- R — Won by referee stop contest

Round 1
Donald Geisler (PHI)	7^{R}
Murad Al-Fakih (YEM)	0
Jasim Hameedi (BRN)	0
Oh Seon-taek (KOR)	4^{K}
Vishwa Deepak Jalan (IND)	3
Liao Chia-yi (TPE)	7
Cheang Weng Mou (MAC)	0
Liu Yang (CHN)	11^{R}
Ranil Tharaka (SRI)	DQ
Antoine Abou Jaoude (LIB)
Basuki Nugroho (INA)	14
Abdelhameed Atalla (QAT)	17

Round 2
Majid Aflaki (IRI)	11
Donald Geisler (PHI)	7
Oh Seon-taek (KOR)	4
Liao Chia-yi (TPE)	1
Liu Yang (CHN)	8
Ranil Tharaka (SRI)	0
Abdelhameed Atalla (QAT)	2
Đinh Vương Duy (VIE)	12

Semifinals
Majid Aflaki (IRI)	1
Oh Seon-taek (KOR)	1
Liu Yang (CHN)	7
Đinh Vương Duy (VIE)	7

Final
Oh Seon-taek (KOR)	11
Đinh Vương Duy (VIE)	1
