= Karate at the 2002 Asian Games – Men's kumite 60 kg =

Karate competition

Men's kumite 60 kg at the 2002 Asian Games
- Venue: Yangsan College Gymnasium
- Date: 12 October 2002
- Competitors: 14 from 14 nations

Medalists
gold medal	Kenichi Imai	Japan
silver medal	Hossein Rouhani	Iran
bronze medal	Ilkhom Karimov	Uzbekistan
bronze medal	Hussain Al-Qattan	Kuwait

The men's kumite 60 kilograms competition at the 2002 Asian Games in Busan was held on 12 October at the Yangsan College Gymnasium.

== Schedule ==
All times are Korea Standard Time (UTC+09:00)

Date	Time	Event
Saturday, 12 October 2002	11:00	1st preliminary round
Saturday, 12 October 2002	11:00	Quarterfinals
Saturday, 12 October 2002	11:00	Semifinals
Saturday, 12 October 2002	11:00	1st repechage
Saturday, 12 October 2002	11:00	Final repechage
Saturday, 12 October 2002	16:30	Final

== Results ==
=== Main bracket ===
1st preliminary round
Rayappan Jebamalai Edward (SRI)	5
Ilkhom Karimov (UZB)	7
Kim Yong-jin (PRK)	0
Khurshed Mukhammedzhanov (TJK)	8
Arief Taufan Syamsuddin (INA)	3
Kenichi Imai (JPN)	4
Filomeno Soares (TMP)	0
Hussain Al-Qattan (KUW)	7
Salem Al-Marzouq (JOR)	0
Hossein Rouhani (IRI)	2
Ernesto Halili (PHI)	6
Chan Chun Ho (HKG)	5

Quarterfinals
Deepak Shrestha (NEP)	1
Ilkhom Karimov (UZB)	10
Khurshed Mukhammedzhanov (TJK)	1
Kenichi Imai (JPN)	9
Hussain Al-Qattan (KUW)	2
Hossein Rouhani (IRI)	2
Ernesto Halili (PHI)	3
Lee Jong-bin (KOR)	8

Semifinals
Ilkhom Karimov (UZB)	0
Kenichi Imai (JPN)	6
Hossein Rouhani (IRI)	10
Lee Jong-bin (KOR)	2

Final
Kenichi Imai (JPN)	3
Hossein Rouhani (IRI)	2

=== Repechage ===
1st repechage
Arief Taufan Syamsuddin (INA)	5
Khurshed Mukhammedzhanov (TJK)	6
Hussain Al-Qattan (KUW)	2
Salem Al-Marzouq (JOR)	0

Final repechage
Khurshed Mukhammedzhanov (TJK)	1
Ilkhom Karimov (UZB)	3
Lee Jong-bin (KOR)	1
Hussain Al-Qattan (KUW)	4
