= Wrestling at the 2002 Asian Games – Men's Greco-Roman 120 kg =

Men's Greco-Roman 120 kg at the 2002 Asian Games
- Venue: Yangsan Gymnasium
- Date: 2–3 October 2002
- Competitors: 9 from 9 nations

Medalists
gold medal	Georgiy Tsurtsumia	Kazakhstan
silver medal	Yang Young-jin	South Korea
bronze medal	Alireza Gharibi	Iran

The men's Greco-Roman 120 kilograms wrestling competition at the 2002 Asian Games in Busan was held on 2 October and 3 October at the Yangsan Gymnasium.

The competition held with an elimination system of three or four wrestlers in each pool, with the winners qualify for the semifinals and final by way of direct elimination.

== Schedule ==
All times are Korea Standard Time (UTC+09:00)

Date	Time	Event
Wednesday, 2 October 2002	10:00	Round 1
Wednesday, 2 October 2002	16:00	Round 2
Wednesday, 2 October 2002	16:00	Round 3
Wednesday, 2 October 2002	16:00	Repechage 1
Wednesday, 2 October 2002	16:00	Repechage 2
Thursday, 3 October 2002	10:00	Repechage 3
Thursday, 3 October 2002	10:00	1/2 finals
Thursday, 3 October 2002	16:00	Finals

== Results ==
=== Preliminary ===
==== Pool 1 ====
Pos	Athlete	Pld	W	L	CP	TP	Qualification
1	Georgiy Tsurtsumia (KAZ)	2	2	0	8	21	Knockout round
2	Dorjpalamyn Gankhuyag (MGL)	2	1	1	3	3	Repechage
3	Hirotoshi Segawa (JPN)	2	0	2	0	0	

Source: Report

	Score		CP
Dorjpalamyn Gankhuyag (MGL)	0–11	Georgiy Tsurtsumia (KAZ)	0–4 ST
Hirotoshi Segawa (JPN)	0–3	Dorjpalamyn Gankhuyag (MGL)	0–3 PO
Georgiy Tsurtsumia (KAZ)	10–0	Hirotoshi Segawa (JPN)	4–0 ST

==== Pool 2 ====
Pos	Athlete	Pld	W	L	CP	TP	Qualification
1	Yang Young-jin (KOR)	2	2	0	6	10	Knockout round
2	Ren Li (CHN)	2	1	1	4	7	Repechage
3	Virender Singh (IND)	2	0	2	1	1	

Source: Report

	Score		CP
Ren Li (CHN)	1–3	Yang Young-jin (KOR)	1–3 PP
Virender Singh (IND)	1–6	Ren Li (CHN)	1–3 PP
Yang Young-jin (KOR)	7–0	Virender Singh (IND)	3–0 PO

==== Pool 3 ====
Pos	Athlete	Pld	W	L	CP	TP	Qualification
1	Alireza Gharibi (IRI)	2	2	0	7	19	Knockout round
2	Shermukhammad Kuziev (UZB)	2	1	1	4	6	Repechage
3	Kirk Go (PHI)	2	0	2	0	0	

Source: Report

	Score		CP
Alireza Gharibi (IRI)	11–0	Kirk Go (PHI)	4–0 ST
Shermukhammad Kuziev (UZB)	0–8	Alireza Gharibi (IRI)	0–3 PO
Kirk Go (PHI)	0–6 Fall	Shermukhammad Kuziev (UZB)	0–4 TO

=== Repechage ===
Pos	Athlete	Pld	W	L	CP	TP	Qualification
1	Shermukhammad Kuziev (UZB)	2	2	0	7	16	Knockout round
2	Ren Li (CHN)	2	1	1	4	7	
3	Dorjpalamyn Gankhuyag (MGL)	2	0	2	0	0	

Source: Report

	Score		CP
Dorjpalamyn Gankhuyag (MGL)	0–3	Ren Li (CHN)	0–3 PO
Shermukhammad Kuziev (UZB)	10–0	Dorjpalamyn Gankhuyag (MGL)	4–0 ST
Ren Li (CHN)	4–6	Shermukhammad Kuziev (UZB)	1–3 PP

=== Knockout round ===
1/2 finals
Georgiy Tsurtsumia (KAZ)	3
Alireza Gharibi (IRI)	0
Yang Young-jin (KOR)	4
Shermukhammad Kuziev (UZB)	0

Final
Georgiy Tsurtsumia (KAZ)	4
Yang Young-jin (KOR)	0
3rd–4th place
Alireza Gharibi (IRI)	4
Shermukhammad Kuziev (UZB)	2

== Final standing ==
Rank	Athlete
1st place, gold medalist(s)	Georgiy Tsurtsumia (KAZ)
2nd place, silver medalist(s)	Yang Young-jin (KOR)
3rd place, bronze medalist(s)	Alireza Gharibi (IRI)
4	Shermukhammad Kuziev (UZB)
5	Ren Li (CHN)
6	Dorjpalamyn Gankhuyag (MGL)
7	Virender Singh (IND)
8	Kirk Go (PHI)
9	Hirotoshi Segawa (JPN)
