= Wushu at the 2002 Asian Games – Men's sanshou 52 kg =

Men's sanshou 52 kg at the 2002 Asian Games
- Venue: Minseok Sports Center
- Dates: 10–13 October 2002
- Competitors: 14 from 14 nations

Medalists
gold medal	Kang Yonggang	China
silver medal	Marvin Sicomen	Philippines
bronze medal	Lee Hou-cheng	Chinese Taipei
bronze medal	Phoukhong Khamsounthone	Laos

The men's sanshou 52 kilograms at the 2002 Asian Games in Busan, South Korea was held from 10 to 13 October at the Dongseo University Minseok Sports Center.

A total of 14 men from 14 different countries competed in this event, limited to fighters whose body weight was less than 52 kilograms.

Kang Yonggang from China won the gold medal after beating Marvin Sicomen of the Philippines in gold medal bout 2–0, The bronze medal was shared by Lee Hou-cheng from Chinese Taipei and Phoukhong Khamsounthone of Laos. Athletes from Myanmar, South Korea, Iran and Yemen shared the fifth place.

== Schedule ==
All times are Korea Standard Time (UTC+09:00)

Date	Time	Event
Thursday, 10 October 2002	15:30	1st preliminary round
Friday, 11 October 2002	14:00	Quarterfinals
Saturday, 12 October 2002	16:00	Semifinals
Sunday, 13 October 2002	14:30	Final

== Results ==
Legend

- KO — Won by knockout

1st preliminary round
Ho Wing Kit (MAC)
Thein Htike Oo (MYA)	KO
Birendra B. K. (NEP)	0
Woo Seung-soo (KOR)	2
Lee Hou-cheng (TPE)	2
Arif Harsoyo (INA)	0
Daniyar Argumbayev (KAZ)	0
Phoukhong Khamsounthone (LAO)	2
Phan Quốc Vinh (VIE)	1
Mehdi Jafarpour (IRI)	2
Marvin Sicomen (PHI)	2
Utkir Hudoyarov (KGZ)	1

Quarterfinals
Kang Yonggang (CHN)	2
Thein Htike Oo (MYA)	0
Woo Seung-soo (KOR)	0
Lee Hou-cheng (TPE)	2
Phoukhong Khamsounthone (LAO)	2
Mehdi Jafarpour (IRI)	1
Marvin Sicomen (PHI)	2
Naji Al-Ashwal (YEM)	0

Semifinals
Kang Yonggang (CHN)	2
Lee Hou-cheng (TPE)	0
Phoukhong Khamsounthone (LAO)	1
Marvin Sicomen (PHI)	2

Final
Kang Yonggang (CHN)	2
Marvin Sicomen (PHI)	0
