= Shooting at the 2002 Asian Games – Women's 10 metre running target =

Women's 10 metre running target at the 2002 Asian Games
- Venue: Changwon International Shooting Range
- Dates: 6 October 2002
- Competitors: 10 from 4 nations

Medalists
gold medal	Xu Xuan	China
silver medal	Natalya Kovalenko	Kazakhstan
bronze medal	Wang Xia	China

The women's 10 metre running target competition at the 2002 Asian Games in Busan, South Korea was held on 6 October at the Changwon International Shooting Range.

== Schedule ==
All times are Korea Standard Time (UTC+09:00)

Date	Time	Event
Sunday, 6 October 2002	09:00	Final

== Records ==
Prior to this competition, the existing world, Asian and Games records were as follows.

World Record	Xu Xuan (CHN)	391	Lahti, Finland	6 July 2002
Asian Record	Xu Xuan (CHN)	391	Lahti, Finland	6 July 2002
Games Record	—	—	—	—

== Results ==
Rank	Athlete	Slow		Fast		Total	S-off	Notes
Rank	Athlete	1	2	1	2	Total	S-off	Notes
1st place, gold medalist(s)	Xu Xuan (CHN)	99	97	98	95	389		GR
2nd place, silver medalist(s)	Natalya Kovalenko (KAZ)	95	98	92	95	380		
3rd place, bronze medalist(s)	Wang Xia (CHN)	96	95	90	98	379		
4	Qiu Wei (CHN)	97	92	89	95	373		
5	Kim Deuk-nam (KOR)	94	94	89	93	370		
6	Kim Moon-sun (KOR)	92	92	97	88	369		
7	Park Jung-yun (KOR)	98	90	84	96	368		
8	Lida Fariman (IRI)	53	63	15	28	159		
9	Raheleh Kheirollahzadeh (IRI)	42	40	15	6	103		
10	Elham Hashemi (IRI)	35	15	17	29	96		
