= Wushu at the 2002 Asian Games – Men's sanshou 60 kg =

Athletic event in Busan, South Korea

Men's sanshou 60 kg at the 2002 Asian Games
- Venue: Minseok Sports Center
- Dates: 10–13 October 2002
- Competitors: 12 from 12 nations

Medalists
gold medal	Liu Zedong	China
silver medal	Kim Gwee-jong	South Korea
bronze medal	Vanxay Oudomphon	Laos
bronze medal	Vichan Toonkratork	Thailand

The men's sanshou 60 kilograms at the 2002 Asian Games in Busan, South Korea was held from 10 to 13 October at the Dongseo University Minseok Sports Center.

12 men from 12 countries competed in this event, limited to fighters whose body weight was less than 60 kilograms.

Liu Zedong from China won the gold medal after beating Kim Gwee-jong of the South Korea in gold medal bout 2–0, The bronze medal was shared by Vanxay Oudomphon and Vichan Toonkratork.

== Schedule ==
All times are Korea Standard Time (UTC+09:00)

Date	Time	Event
Thursday, 10 October 2002	15:30	1st preliminary round
Friday, 11 October 2002	14:00	Quarterfinals
Saturday, 12 October 2002	16:00	Semifinals
Sunday, 13 October 2002	14:30	Final

== Results ==
Legend

- KO — Won by knockout
- RET — Won by retirement

1st preliminary round
Joseph Pasiwat (PHI)	2
Mehdi Mohammadinasab (IRI)	0
Narayan Shrestha (NEP)
Vanxay Oudomphon (LAO)	RET
Vichan Toonkratork (THA)	2
Joseph Kamel (LIB)	0
Badamyn Bürenzevseg (MGL)	0
Wang Yeh-hao (TPE)	2

Quarterfinals
Liu Zedong (CHN)	2
Joseph Pasiwat (PHI)	1
Vanxay Oudomphon (LAO)	KO
Đỗ Ngọc Đại (VIE)
Nurlan Zhunuspekov (KAZ)	0
Vichan Toonkratork (THA)	2
Wang Yeh-hao (TPE)	0
Kim Gwee-jong (KOR)	2

Semifinals
Liu Zedong (CHN)	KO
Vanxay Oudomphon (LAO)
Vichan Toonkratork (THA)	1
Kim Gwee-jong (KOR)	2

Final
Liu Zedong (CHN)	2
Kim Gwee-jong (KOR)	0
