= Weightlifting at the 2002 Asian Games – Men's +105 kg =

Men's +105 kg at the 2002 Asian Games
- Venue: Pukyong National University Gymnasium
- Date: 10 October 2002
- Competitors: 6 from 5 nations

Medalists
gold medal	Hossein Rezazadeh	Iran
silver medal	Igor Khalilov	Uzbekistan
bronze medal	Munehiro Morita	Japan

The men's +105 kilograms event at the 2002 Asian Games took place on October 10, 2002 at Pukyong National University Gymnasium.

== Schedule ==
All times are Korea Standard Time (UTC+09:00)

Date	Time	Event
Thursday, 10 October 2002	15:00	Group A

== Records ==
Prior to this competition, the existing world, Asian and Games records were as follows.

World Record	Snatch	Hossein Rezazadeh (IRI)	212.5 kg	Sydney, Australia	26 September 2000
World Record	Clean & Jerk	World Standard	262.5 kg	—	1 January 1998
World Record	Total	Hossein Rezazadeh (IRI)	472.5 kg	Sydney, Australia	26 September 2000
Asian Record	Snatch	Hossein Rezazadeh (IRI)	212.5 kg	Sydney, Australia	26 September 2000
Asian Record	Clean & Jerk	Kim Tae-hyun (KOR)	260.0 kg	Sydney, Australia	26 September 2000
Asian Record	Total	Hossein Rezazadeh (IRI)	472.5 kg	Sydney, Australia	26 September 2000
Games Record	Snatch	Kim Tae-hyun (KOR)	195.0 kg	Bangkok, Thailand	14 December 1998
Games Record	Clean & Jerk	Kim Tae-hyun (KOR)	232.5 kg	Bangkok, Thailand	14 December 1998
Games Record	Total	Kim Tae-hyun (KOR)	427.5 kg	Bangkok, Thailand	14 December 1998

== Results ==
Legend

- NM — No mark

Rank	Athlete	Body weight	Snatch (kg)				Clean & Jerk (kg)				Total
Rank	Athlete	Body weight	1	2	3	Result	1	2	3	Result	Total
1st place, gold medalist(s)	Hossein Rezazadeh (IRI)	156.00	190.0	200.0	—	200.0	240.0	~~263.0~~	—	240.0	440.0
2nd place, silver medalist(s)	Igor Khalilov (UZB)	134.50	175.0	180.0	185.0	185.0	212.5	220.0	~~230.0~~	220.0	405.0
3rd place, bronze medalist(s)	Munehiro Morita (JPN)	112.05	~~170.0~~	170.0	175.0	175.0	200.0	~~210.0~~	~~210.0~~	200.0	375.0
4	Eiji Inagaki (JPN)	107.45	140.0	150.0	~~155.0~~	150.0	180.0	~~190.0~~	190.0	190.0	340.0
5	Ali Abdulla Yahya (BRN)	105.30	130.0	~~135.0~~	~~135.0~~	130.0	160.0	~~170.0~~	~~170.0~~	160.0	290.0
—	Awad Al-Aboudi (JOR)	140.40	172.5	177.5	~~182.5~~	177.5	~~200.0~~	~~200.0~~	~~200.0~~	—	NM

== New records ==
The following records were established during the competition.

Snatch	200.0	Hossein Rezazadeh (IRI)	GR
Clean & Jerk	240.0	Hossein Rezazadeh (IRI)	GR
Total	440.0	Hossein Rezazadeh (IRI)	GR
