= Wushu at the 2002 Asian Games – Men's sanshou 65 kg =

Men's sanshou 65 kg at the 2002 Asian Games
- Venue: Minseok Sports Center
- Dates: 10–13 October 2002
- Competitors: 10 from 10 nations

Medalists
gold medal	Angkhan Chomphuphuang	Thailand
silver medal	Mohammad Aghaei	Iran
bronze medal	Yu Dawei	China
bronze medal	Eduard Folayang	Philippines

The men's sanshou 65 kilograms at the 2002 Asian Games in Busan, South Korea was held from 10 to 13 October at the Dongseo University Minseok Sports Center.

A total of ten competitors from ten countries competed in this event, limited to fighters whose body weight was less than 65 kilograms in competition.

Angkhan Chomphuphuang from Thailand won the gold medal after beating Mohammad Aghaei of Iran in gold medal bout 2–0, The bronze medal was shared by Yu Dawei and Eduard Folayang.

== Schedule ==
All times are Korea Standard Time (UTC+09:00)

Date	Time	Event
Thursday, 10 October 2002	15:30	1st preliminary round
Friday, 11 October 2002	14:00	Quarterfinals
Saturday, 12 October 2002	16:00	Semifinals
Sunday, 13 October 2002	14:30	Final

== Results ==
Legend

- KO — Won by knockout

1st preliminary round
Mohammad Aghaei (IRI)	2
Hiroyuki Enami (JPN)	0
Angkhan Chomphuphuang (THA)	2
Choi Young-min (KOR)	0

Quarterfinals
Phùng Anh Tuấn (VIE)	0
Mohammad Aghaei (IRI)	2
Yu Dawei (CHN)	2
Dias Zhamash (KAZ)	0
Chen Shie-hung (TPE)	0
Eduard Folayang (PHI)	2
Angkhan Chomphuphuang (THA)	2
Shyam Bista (NEP)	0

Semifinals
Mohammad Aghaei (IRI)	2
Yu Dawei (CHN)	1
Eduard Folayang (PHI)
Angkhan Chomphuphuang (THA)	KO

Final
Mohammad Aghaei (IRI)	0
Angkhan Chomphuphuang (THA)	2
