= 2004 Asian Judo Championships =

Judo competition

The 2004 Asian Judo Championships were held at the Baluan Sholak Palace of Culture and Sports in Almaty, Kazakhstan from 15 May to 16 May 2004. A total of 194 judokas participated, 113 men and 81 women.

== Medal summary ==
=== Men ===
Event	Gold	Silver	Bronze
Extra lightweight −60 kg	Bazarbek Donbay; Kazakhstan	Cho Nam-suk; South Korea	Tatsuaki Egusa; Japan
Extra lightweight −60 kg	Bazarbek Donbay; Kazakhstan	Cho Nam-suk; South Korea	Khashbaataryn Tsagaanbaatar; Mongolia
Half lightweight −66 kg	Muratbek Kipshakbayev; Kazakhstan	Gantömöriin Dashdavaa; Mongolia	Bang Gui-man; South Korea
Half lightweight −66 kg	Muratbek Kipshakbayev; Kazakhstan	Gantömöriin Dashdavaa; Mongolia	Murat Kalikulov; Uzbekistan
Lightweight −73 kg	Kim Jae-hoon; South Korea	Sagdat Sadykov; Kazakhstan	Egamnazar Akbarov; Uzbekistan
Lightweight −73 kg	Kim Jae-hoon; South Korea	Sagdat Sadykov; Kazakhstan	Masahiro Takamatsu; Japan
Half middleweight −81 kg	Ramziddin Sayidov; Uzbekistan	Reza Chahkhandagh; Iran	Masahiko Tomouchi; Japan
Half middleweight −81 kg	Ramziddin Sayidov; Uzbekistan	Reza Chahkhandagh; Iran	Kwon Young-woo; South Korea
Middleweight −90 kg	Park Sun-woo; South Korea	Vyacheslav Pereteyko; Uzbekistan	Krisna Bayu; Indonesia
Middleweight −90 kg	Park Sun-woo; South Korea	Vyacheslav Pereteyko; Uzbekistan	Hiroshi Izumi; Japan
Half heavyweight −100 kg	Askhat Zhitkeyev; Kazakhstan	Jang Sung-ho; South Korea	Takeo Shoji; Japan
Half heavyweight −100 kg	Askhat Zhitkeyev; Kazakhstan	Jang Sung-ho; South Korea	Abbas Fallah; Iran
Heavyweight +100 kg	Kim Sung-bum; South Korea	Keiji Suzuki; Japan	Yeldos Ikhsangaliyev; Kazakhstan
Heavyweight +100 kg	Kim Sung-bum; South Korea	Keiji Suzuki; Japan	Abdullo Tangriev; Uzbekistan
Openweight	Hong Sung-hyun; South Korea	Yeldos Ikhsangaliyev; Kazakhstan	Hidekazu Shoda; Japan
Openweight	Hong Sung-hyun; South Korea	Yeldos Ikhsangaliyev; Kazakhstan	Abbas Fallah; Iran

=== Women ===
Event	Gold	Silver	Bronze
Extra lightweight −48 kg	Kayo Kitada; Japan	Ri Kyong-ok; North Korea	Tatyana Shishkina; Kazakhstan
Extra lightweight −48 kg	Kayo Kitada; Japan	Ri Kyong-ok; North Korea	Zhao Shunxin; China
Half lightweight −52 kg	Lee Eun-hee; South Korea	Xian Dongmei; China	An Kum-ae; North Korea
Half lightweight −52 kg	Lee Eun-hee; South Korea	Xian Dongmei; China	Natsuko Kimijima; Japan
Lightweight −57 kg	Liu Yuxiang; China	Khishigbatyn Erdenet-Od; Mongolia	Kie Kusakabe; Japan
Lightweight −57 kg	Liu Yuxiang; China	Khishigbatyn Erdenet-Od; Mongolia	Choe Hyon-ju; North Korea
Half middleweight −63 kg	Ayumi Tanimoto; Japan	Lee Bok-hee; South Korea	Hong Ok-song; North Korea
Half middleweight −63 kg	Ayumi Tanimoto; Japan	Lee Bok-hee; South Korea	Li Shufang; China
Middleweight −70 kg	Masae Ueno; Japan	Kim Ryon-mi; North Korea	Sagat Abikeyeva; Kazakhstan
Middleweight −70 kg	Masae Ueno; Japan	Kim Ryon-mi; North Korea	Kim Mi-jung; South Korea
Half heavyweight −78 kg	Sae Nakazawa; Japan	Liu Xia; China	Choi Sook-ie; South Korea
Half heavyweight −78 kg	Sae Nakazawa; Japan	Liu Xia; China	Varvara Masyagina; Kazakhstan
Heavyweight +78 kg	Xue Fuyan; China	Erdene-Ochiryn Dolgormaa; Mongolia	Kei Eguchi; Japan
Heavyweight +78 kg	Xue Fuyan; China	Erdene-Ochiryn Dolgormaa; Mongolia	Choi Sook-ie; South Korea
Openweight	Xu Lihui; China	Mika Sugimoto; Japan	Cho Hye-jin; South Korea
Openweight	Xu Lihui; China	Mika Sugimoto; Japan	Mariya Shekerova; Uzbekistan

== Medal table ==
Rank	Nation	Gold	Silver	Bronze	Total
1	South Korea	5	3	6	14
2	Japan	4	2	9	15
3	Kazakhstan	3	2	4	9
4	China	3	2	2	7
5	Uzbekistan	1	1	4	6
6	Mongolia	0	3	1	4
7	North Korea	0	2	3	5
8	Iran	0	1	2	3
9	Indonesia	0	0	1	1
Totals (9 entries)		16	16	32	64
