= Deepali Deshpande =

Indian sport shooter (born 1969)

Personal information
- Full name: Deepali Deshpande
- Nationality: India
- Born: 3 August 1969 (age 57) Mumbai, India
- Height: 1.59 m (5 ft 3 in)
- Weight: 54 kg (119 lb)

Sport
- Sport: Shooting
- Events: 10 m air rifle (AR40); 50 m rifle 3 positions (STR3X20)
- Coached by: Laszlo Szucsak
- Now coaching: Swapnil Kusale
Medal record
Women's shooting
Representing India
Asian Games
Silver medal – second place	2002 Busan	10 m air rifle team

Deepali Deshpande (born 3 August 1969) is an Indian coach and former sport shooter. She won a silver medal in rifle shooting at the 2004 Asian Shooting Championships in Kuala Lumpur, Malaysia, and was selected to compete for India at the 2004 Summer Olympics, finishing nineteenth in the rifle three positions. Deshpande also served throughout her sporting career as a member of the Indian Shooting Federation under her coaches Laszlo Szucsak and Sunny Thomas.

== Career ==
Deshpande qualified for the Indian squad, along with her compatriot Anjali Bhagwat, in the women's 50 m rifle 3 positions at the 2004 Summer Olympics in Athens, by shooting a minimum qualifying score of 571 to obtain a seventh-place finish and assure an Olympic slot from the Asian Championships in Kuala Lumpur, Malaysia. She fired 194 in the prone position and 189 each in both standing and kneeling to aggregate a total record of 572 points, ending her up in nineteenth place from a field of thirty-two prospective shooters.
