= Ulan Nadyrbek Uulu =

Kyrgyzstani wrestler (born 1981)

Personal information
- Full name: Ulan Nadyrbek Uulu
- Nationality: Kyrgyzstan
- Born: 5 January 1981 (age 45) Frunze, Kirghiz SSR, Soviet Union
- Height: 1.70 m (5 ft 7 in)
- Weight: 60 kg (132 lb)

Sport
- Style: Freestyle
- Club: Edishor 4 Wrestling Club
- Coach: Kenzhebek Omuraliev
Medal record
Men's freestyle wrestling
Representing Kyrgyzstan
Asian Games
Bronze medal – third place	2002 Busan	60 kg

Ulan Nadyrbek Uulu (Russian: Улан Надырбек Уулу; born 5 January 1981 in Bishkek) is an amateur Kyrgyz freestyle wrestler, who competed in the men's lightweight category. He won a silver medal in the 60-kg division at the 2002 Asian Games in Busan, South Korea, and later represented his nation Kyrgyzstan at the 2004 Summer Olympics. Uulu also trained throughout his sporting career for Edishor 4 Wrestling Club in Bishkek under his personal coach and mentor Kenjibek Umaraliev.

Uulu made sporting headlines at the 2002 Asian Games in Busan, South Korea, where he picked up a bronze medal over India's Shokinder Tomar with a colossal fall in the men's lightweight category.

At the 2004 Summer Olympics in Athens, Uulu qualified for the Kyrgyz squad in the men's 60 kg class. Earlier in the process, he placed seventh and received a spot on the Kyrgyz wrestling team from the 2003 World Wrestling Championships in New York City, New York, United States. In the prelim pool, Uulu made a strong start with a comfortable 3–0 decision over Hungary's Gergõ Wöller, before being tamed in his next match by Ukraine's Vasyl Fedoryshyn 3–5. Placing second in the pool and twelfth overall, Uulu failed to advance to the quarterfinals.
