= 2003 Universiade =

2003 Universiade may refer to:

- 2003 Summer Universiade
- 2003 Winter Universiade
