= Askhat Zhitkeyev =

Kazakhstani judoka (born 1981)

Personal information
- Full name: Askhat Rasulovich Zhitkeyev
- Born: 13 April 1981 (age 45) Taldykurgan, Kazakh SSR, Soviet Union
- Occupation: Judoka

Sport
- Country: Kazakhstan
- Sport: Judo
- Weight class: –100 kg
- Rank: 6th dan black belt

Achievements and titles
- Olympic Games: (silver) (2008)
- World Champ.: (bronze) (2001)
- Asian Champ.: (gold) (2003, 2004, 2008)
Medal record
Men's judo
Representing Kazakhstan
Olympic Games
Silver medal – second place	2008 Beijing	‍–‍100 kg
World Championships
Bronze medal – third place	2001 Munich	‍–‍100 kg
Asian Games
Bronze medal – third place	2002 Busan	‍–‍100 kg
Bronze medal – third place	2006 Doha	‍–‍100 kg
Bronze medal – third place	2006 Doha	Open
Asian Championships
Gold medal – first place	2003 Jeju	‍–‍100 kg
Gold medal – first place	2004 Almaty	‍–‍100 kg
Gold medal – first place	2008 Jeju	‍–‍100 kg
Silver medal – second place	2005 Tashkent	‍–‍100 kg

Profile at external databases
- IJF: 496
- JudoInside.com: 9109
- Updated on 30 May 2023

Askhat Rasulovich Zhitkeyev (Kazakh: Asqat Rasulūly Jıtkeev, born 13 April 1981) is a Kazakh judoka. He won a silver medal at the 2008 Olympics in the ‍–‍100 kg division and a bronze medal at the 2001 world judo championships in the ‍–‍100 kg division. He won three bronze medals at the ‍–‍100 kg category at the Asian Games.

Olympic Games
Preceded by Radik Bikchentayev	Flagbearer for Kazakhstan; Athens 2004	Succeeded by Alexander Koreshkov
