= Cho Byung-kwan =

South Korean freestyle wrestler

Medal record

Men's freestyle wrestling

Representing South Korea

Asian Championships
Gold medal – first place	2008 Jeju City	74 kg freestyle

Cho Byung-Kwan (born May 5, 1981) is a male freestyle wrestler from South Korea. He participated in Men's freestyle 74 kg at 2008 Summer Olympics. In the 1/16 of final he lost to Buvaisar Saitiev, but he got to the repechage round. There he beat Ahmet Gülhan, but then lost to Iván Fundora and was eliminated.
