= Behzad Khodadad =

Iranian taekwondo practitioner

Medal record

Men's taekwondo

Representing Iran

World Championships
Gold medal – first place	2001 Jeju City	58 kg
Silver medal – second place	2003 Garmisch-Partenkirchen	58 kg
Silver medal – second place	2005 Madrid	58 kg

world cup
Silver medal – second place	1998 Sindelfingen	50 kg
Bronze medal – third place	2000 tokio	58 kg

World university Championships
Gold medal – first place	2004 patra	58 kg
Gold medal – first place	2006valencia	58 kg

Asian Games
Silver medal – second place	2002 Busan	58 kg
Bronze medal – third place	2006 Doha	58 kg

Asian Championships
Bronze medal – third place	2002 Amman	58 kg
Gold medal – first place	2007 vietnam	58 kg

Universiade
Silver medal – second place	2003 Daegu	62 kg
Bronze medal – third place	2005 İzmir	58 kg

Behzad Khodadad Kanjobeh (Persian: بهزاد خداداد كنجوبه, born April 25, 1981, in Tehran, Iran) is an Iranian Taekwondo athlete. He is the 2001 world champion.head coach Greece national team
