= Abbas Fallah =

Iranian judoka (born 1976)

Personal information
- Born: 3 September 1976 (age 49)
- Occupation: Judoka

Sport
- Sport: Judo
Medal record
Representing Iran
Men's Judo
Asian Games
Bronze medal – third place	2002 Busan	100 kg
Asian Championships
Bronze medal – third place	2001 Ulaanbaatar	100 kg
Bronze medal – third place	2001 Ulaanbaatar	Open
Bronze medal – third place	2004 Almaty	100 kg
Bronze medal – third place	2004 Almaty	Open

Profile at external databases
- JudoInside.com: 23010

Abbas Fallah (Persian: عباس فلاح; born September 3, 1976) is an Iranian judoka.

Participating at the 2004 Olympic Games, he was stopped in the round of 32 by Keith Morgan of Canada. He finished in joint fifth place in the half-heavyweight (100 kg) division at the 2006 Asian Games, having lost to Askhat Zhitkeyev of Kazakhstan in the bronze medal match.
