= Ershad Yousefi =

Iranian footballer (born 1981)

Personal information
- Full name: Ershad Yousefi
- Date of birth: September 19, 1981 (age 45)
- Place of birth: Mashhad, Iran
- Position: Goalkeeper

Senior career*
Years	Team	Apps	(Gls)
2000–2003	Aboomoslem	42	(0)
2003–2004	Sepahan	17	(0)
2004–2005	Shamoushak	19	(0)
2005–2007	Saipa	23	(0)
2007–2008	Shirin Faraz	19	(0)
2008–2010	Saba	40	(0)
2010–2012	Mes	49	(0)
2012–2014	Foolad	28	(0)
2014–2016	Mes	20	(0)
2016–2018	Oxin	22	(0)
2018–2019	Aluminium	8	(0)

International career
2001–2002	Iran U20	2	(0)
2005	Iran B		
Medal record
Representing Iran
Asian Games
Gold medal – first place	2002 Busan	Team competition
- * Club domestic league appearances and goals

Ershad Yousefi (Persian: ارشاد یوسفی, born September 19, 1981, in Mashhad, Iran) is an Iranian football goalkeeper who most recently plays for Foolad in Iran Pro League.

== Club career ==
=== Club Career Statistics ===
Last Update 25 May 2015

Club performance			League		Cup		Continental		Total	
Season	Club	League	Apps	Goals	Apps	Goals	Apps	Goals	Apps	Goals
Iran			League		Hazfi Cup		Asia		Total	
2004–05	Shamoushak	Pro League	19	0		0	-	-		0
2005–06	Saipa	Pro League	16	0		0	-	-		0
2006–07	Saipa	Pro League	7	0		0	-	-		0
2007–08	Shirin Faraz	Pro League	19	0		0	-	-		0
2008–09	Saba	Pro League	12	0		0	0	0		0
2009–10	Saba	Pro League	28	0		0	-	-		0
2010–11	Mes	Pro League	20	0		0	-	-		
2011–12	Mes	Pro League	29	0		0	-	-		
2012–13	Foolad	Pro League	19	0	1	0	-	-	20	0
2013–14	Foolad	Pro League	7	0	0	0	1	0	8	0
2014–15	Foolad	Pro League	2	0	0	0	0	0	2	0
Career total			177	0		0	1	0		0

== International career ==
He was the goalkeeper of Iran national under-20 football team at the 2001 FIFA World Youth Championship held in Argentina. In 2002, he was the reserve goalkeeper for Iran national football team at the West Asian Football Federation Championship, but did not make an appearance. In 2005, he was goalkeeper for Iran Under-23 team that participated in the 2005 Islamic Solidarity Games in Saudi Arabia.

== Honours ==
Foolad

- Iran Pro League (1): 2013–14

Sepahan

- Hazfi Cup (1}: 2003–04
