= Abdulqader Al-Adhami =

Qatari taekwondo practitioner

Abdulqader al-Adhami
Personal information
- Nationality: Qatar
- Born: 2 June 1981 (age 44)

Sport
- Sport: Taekwondo

Abdulqader al-Adhami (born 2 June 1981) is a Qatari taekwondo practitioner.

== Achievements ==
Year	Tournament	Place	Weight class
2011	World Taekwondo Olympic Qualification Tournament		Heavyweight (80 kg)
2010	Asian Taekwondo Championships	3rd	Heavyweight (84 kg)
2009	World Taekwondo Championships		Heavyweight (87 kg)
2006	Asian Games	3rd	Heavyweight (84 kg)
2006	Asian Taekwondo Championships	2nd	Heavyweight (84 kg)
2004	Asian Taekwondo Championships	2nd	Heavyweight (84 kg)
2003	World Taekwondo Championships		Heavyweight (83 kg)
2002	Asian Taekwondo Championships	3rd	Heavyweight (84 kg)
2002	Asian Games	3rd	Heavyweight (84 kg)
2001	World Taekwondo Championships		Heavyweight (84 kg)
2000	Asian Taekwondo Championships	3rd	Heavyweight (84 kg)
