= Siriguleng =

Chinese-born Mongolian wrestler (born 1980)

Siriguleng (Mongolian:Sergelen; born 16 May 1980 in Inner Mongolia) is a male Mongol freestyle wrestler from PRC who competed at the 2008 Summer Olympics.

His personal best was coming 1st at the 2005 Asian Championships.

He has a 1-1-0 record as an MMA fighter.
