= Yeldos Ikhsangaliyev =

Kazakhstani judoka (born 1978)

Personal information
- Born: 8 July 1978 (age 47)
- Occupation: Judoka

Sport
- Sport: Judo
Medal record
Men's Judo
Representing Kazakhstan
Asian Games
Bronze medal – third place	2006 Doha	+100 kg
East Asian Games
Bronze medal – third place	2001 Osaka	Open
Asian Championships
Silver medal – second place	2004 Almaty	Open
Bronze medal – third place	2000 Osaka	+100 kg
Bronze medal – third place	2001 Ulaanbaatar	+100 kg
Bronze medal – third place	2003 Jeju	+100 kg
Bronze medal – third place	2004 Almaty	+100 kg
Bronze medal – third place	2005 Tashkent	+100 kg

Profile at external databases
- JudoInside.com: 7997

Yeldos Ikhsangaliyev (born 8 July 1978) is a Kazakh judoka. He won a bronze medal in the Men's +100 kg Category at the 2006 Asian Games. He won a silver medal at the 2004 Asian Judo Championships and bronze medals at the 2001, 2003, 2004, and 2005 Asian Judo Championships.
