= Majid Aflaki =

Iranian taekwondo practitioner

Personal information
- Nationality: Iranian
- Born: 26 August 1973 (age 51)
- Height: 1.84 m (6 ft 0 in)
- Weight: 77 kg (170 lb)

Sport
- Sport: Taekwondo

Majid Aflaki (Persian: مجید افلاکی; born 26 August 1973) is an Iranian taekwondo practitioner. He competed in the 2000 Summer Olympics.
