= Palestine at the 2002 Asian Games =

- IOC code: PLE
- NOC: Palestine Olympic Committee

in Busan
- Medals Ranked 36th: Gold 0 Silver 0 Bronze 1 Total 1

Asian Games appearances (overview)
- 1990; 1994; 1998; 2002; 2006; 2010; 2014; 2018; 2022; 2026

Palestine participated in the 2002 Asian Games held in Busan, South Korea, from September 29 to October 14, 2002. Athletes from Palestine won only one bronze medal, and finished at the 36th spot in the medal table.
