= Roslina Bakar =

Malaysian sport shooter (born 1973)

Personal information
- Nationality: Malaysian

Sport
- Country: Malaysia
- Sport: Shooting
Medal record
Commonwealth Games
Bronze medal – third place	1998 Kuala Lumpur	50m rifle three positions
Bronze medal – third place	2002 Manchester	50m rifle three positions

Roslina Bakar (born 22 August 1973) is a Malaysian sport shooter.

Bakar competed at the Commonwealth Games in 1998 where she won a bronze medal in the 50m rifle three position event and at the 2002 Games where she won another bronze medal in the same event.
