= Zorigtyn Batkhuyag =

Mongolian sport shooter (born 1974)

Personal information
- Nationality: Mongolia
- Born: 19 March 1974 (age 52) Ulaanbaatar, Mongolia
- Height: 1.61 m (5 ft 3 in)
- Weight: 65 kg (143 lb)

Sport
- Sport: Shooting
- Event(s): 10 m air rifle (AR40); 50 m rifle 3 positions (STR3X20)
- Coached by: Olzod Enkhsaikhan
Medal record
Women's shooting
Representing Mongolia
Asian Championships
Bronze medal – third place	2007 Kuwait City	50 m rifle 3 positions team

Zorigtyn Batkhuyag (also Batkhuyag Zorigt, Mongolian: Зоригтын Батхуяг; born March 19, 1974, in Ulaanbaatar) is a Mongolian sport shooter. Zorigt made her official debut for the 2000 Summer Olympics in Sydney, where she placed twentieth in the 10 m air rifle, and twenty-third in the 50 m rifle 3 positions, with total scores of 391 and 572 points, respectively.

Eight years after competing in her first Olympics, Zorigt qualified for her second Mongolian team, as a 34-year-old, at the 2008 Summer Olympics in Beijing, by finishing third in the air rifle from the 2006 ISSF World Cup series in Guangzhou, China. She placed twenty-second in the women's 10 m air rifle by one point behind Finland's Hanna Etula from the final attempt, with a total score of 394 points. Nearly a week later, Zorigt competed for her second event, 50 m rifle 3 positions, where she was able to shoot 194 targets in a prone position, 181 in standing, and 195 in kneeling, for a total score of 570 points, finishing only in thirty-third place.
