= Sasithorn Hongprasert =

Thai sport shooter (born 1984)

Personal information
- Nationality: Thailand
- Born: 13 June 1984 (age 42) Bangkok, Thailand
- Height: 1.65 m (5 ft 5 in)
- Weight: 57 kg (126 lb)

Sport
- Sport: Shooting
- Event(s): 10 m air rifle (AR40); 50 m rifle 3 positions (STR3X20)
Medal record
Women's shooting
Representing Thailand
Southeast Asian Games
Gold medal – first place	2007 Bangkok	10 m air rifle team
Gold medal – first place	2007 Bangkok	50 m rifle 3 positions
Gold medal – first place	2007 Bangkok	50 m rifle 3 positions team
Silver medal – second place	2007 Bangkok	50 m rifle prone team

Sasithorn Hongprasert (Thai: ศศิธร หงษ์ประเสริฐ; born June 13, 1984, in Bangkok) is a Thai sport shooter. She won a gold medal for the rifle three positions at the 2007 Southeast Asian Games, coincidentally in her home city Bangkok, with a score of 669.5 points.

Hongprasert represented Thailand at the 2008 Summer Olympics in Beijing, where she competed in two rifle shooting events, along with her teammate Thanyalak Chotphibunsin. She placed thirty-sixth out of forty-seven shooters in the women's 10 m air rifle, with a total score of 390 points. Nearly a week later, Hongprasert competed for her second event, 50 m rifle 3 positions, where she was able to shoot 191 targets in a prone position, 185 in standing, and 190 in kneeling, for a total score of 565 points, finishing only in forty-first place.
