= Laos at the 2002 Asian Games =

- IOC code: LAO
- NOC: National Olympic Committee of Lao

in Busan
- Medals Ranked 34th: Gold 0 Silver 0 Bronze 2 Total 2

Asian Games appearances (overview)
- 1974; 1978; 1982; 1986; 1990; 1994; 1998; 2002; 2006; 2010; 2014; 2018; 2022; 2026

Laos participated in the 2002 Asian Games held in Busan, South Korea, from September 29 to October 14, 2002. Athletes from Laos won overall two medals, all bronze, and clinched 34th spot in the medal table.
