= Elham Hashemi =

Iranian sports shooter

Personal information
- Full name: Elham Hashemi Masoumi
- Nationality: Iran
- Born: 19 September 1971 (age 54) Shiraz, Iran
- Occupation(s): Athlete and Shooting Coach

Sport
- Sport: Sports shooting
Medal record
Representing Iran
Women's shooting
Asian Games
Bronze medal – third place	2002 Busan	10m RT team

Elham Hashemi Masoumi (Persian: الهام هاشمی معصومی, born 19 September 1971 in Shiraz) is an Iranian shooting coach and former sport shooter. She coached the Iranian rifle team at the 2020 Summer Olympics Hashemi also has an A ISSF coaching degree. She also won a bronze medal at the 2002 Asian Games.
