= Lida Fariman =

Iranian sports shooter (born 1972)

Personal information
- Nationality: Iranian
- Born: 7 October 1972 (age 53) Tabriz, Iran

Sport
- Sport: Sports shooting
Medal record
Women's shooting
Representing Iran
Asian Games
Bronze medal – third place	2002 Busan	10m RT team

Lida Fariman (Persian: لیدا فریمان, born 10 July 1972) is an Iranian sports shooter. She was born in Tabriz. She competed in the women's 10 metre air rifle event at the 1996 Summer Olympics.

Olympic Games
Preceded by Alireza Soleimani	Flagbearer for Iran; Atlanta 1996	Succeeded by Amir Reza Khadem
