= Syria at the 2002 Asian Games =

- IOC code: SYR
- NOC: Syrian Olympic Committee

in Busan
- Medals Ranked 33rd: Gold 0 Silver 0 Bronze 3 Total 3

Asian Games appearances (overview)
- 1951; 1954; 1958; 1962; 1966; 1970; 1974; 1978; 1982; 1986; 1990; 1994; 1998; 2002; 2006; 2010; 2014; 2018; 2022; 2026

Syria (SYR) competed at the 2002 Asian Games in Busan, South Korea. The total medal tally was 3 bronzes.

== Medals ==
=== Bronze ===
Boxing

- Men's Heavyweight 91 kg: Naser Al-Shami
- Men's Featherweight 57 kg: Yasser Sheikhan

Wrestling

- Men's Greco-Roman 84 kg: Mohammad Ken

== See also ==
- Syria at the 2006 Asian Games
