= Kuwait at the 2002 Asian Games =

- IOC code: KUW
- NOC: Kuwait Olympic Committee

in Busan
- Medals Ranked 20th: Gold 2 Silver 1 Bronze 5 Total 8

Asian Games appearances (overview)
- 1974; 1978; 1982; 1986; 1990; 1994; 1998; 2002; 2006; 2010; 2014; 2018; 2022; 2026

Other related appearances
- Athletes from Kuwait (2010)

Kuwait participated in the 2002 Asian Games held in Busan, South Korea, from September 29 to October 14, 2002. Athletes from Kuwait won overall eight medals (including two golds), and clinched 20th spot in the medal table.
