= Mongolia at the 2002 Asian Games =

- IOC code: MGL
- NOC: Mongolian National Olympic Committee

in Busan
- Medals Ranked 26th: Gold 1 Silver 1 Bronze 12 Total 14

Asian Games appearances (overview)
- 1974; 1978; 1982; 1986; 1990; 1994; 1998; 2002; 2006; 2010; 2014; 2018; 2022; 2026

Mongolia participated in the 2002 Asian Games held in Busan, South Korea, from September 29 to October 14, 2002. Athletes from Mongolia won overall 14 medals (including one gold), and clinched 26th spot in the medal table.

== Medal summary ==
=== Medals by sport ===
Sport	Gold	Silver	Bronze	Total
Judo		1	5	6
Shooting			1	1
Wrestling	1		4	5
Wushu			2	2
Total	1	1	12	14

=== Medalists ===
Medal	Athlete	Sport	Event
Gold	Oyuunbilegiin Pürevbaatar	Wrestling	Men's 60 kg
Silver	Tsend-Ayuushiin Ochirbat	Judo	Men's 90 kg
Bronze	Norjingiin Bayarmagnai	Wrestling	Men's 66 kg
Bronze	Tsogtbazaryn Enkhjargal	Wrestling	Women's 48 kg
Bronze	Naidangiin Otgonjargal	Wrestling	Women's 55 kg
Bronze	Ochirbatyn Myagmarsüren	Wrestling	Women's 63 kg
Bronze	Gantömöriin Dashdavaa	Judo	Men's 66 kg
Bronze	Damdinsürengiin Nyamkhüü	Judo	Men's 81 kg
Bronze	Khishigbatyn Erdenet-Od	Judo	Women's 57 kg
Bronze	Erdene-Ochiryn Dolgormaa	Judo	Women's + 78 kg
Bronze	Erdene-Ochiryn Dolgormaa	Judo	Women's openweight
Bronze	Otryadyn Gündegmaa	Shooting	Women's 25 metre pistol
Bronze	Ulziibadrakh Saruul-Od	Wushu	Men's sanda 56 kg
Bronze	Magsarja Batjargal	Wushu	Men's sanda 70 kg
