= Kyrgyzstan at the 2002 Asian Games =

- IOC code: KGZ
- NOC: National Olympic Committee of the Republic of Kyrgyzstan

in Busan
- Medals Ranked 23rd: Gold 2 Silver 4 Bronze 6 Total 12

Asian Games appearances (overview)
- 1994; 1998; 2002; 2006; 2010; 2014; 2018; 2022; 2026

Kyrgyzstan participated in the 2002 Asian Games held in Busan, South Korea, from September 29 to October 14, 2002. Athletes from Kyrgyzstan won overall twelve medals (including one gold), and clinched 23rd spot in the medal table.
