= Uzbekistan at the 2002 Asian Games =

- IOC code: UZB
- NOC: National Olympic Committee of the Republic of Uzbekistan

in Busan
- Medals Ranked 5th: Gold 15 Silver 12 Bronze 24 Total 51

Asian Games appearances (overview)
- 1994; 1998; 2002; 2006; 2010; 2014; 2018; 2022; 2026

Uzbekistan participated in the 2002 Asian Games held in Busan, South Korea, from September 29 to October 14, 2002. Athletes from Uzbekistan won overall 51 medals (including 15 golds), and clinched fifth spot in the medal table.
