= Qatar at the 2002 Asian Games =

- IOC code: QAT
- NOC: Qatar Olympic Committee

in Busan
- Medals Ranked 17th: Gold 4 Silver 5 Bronze 8 Total 17

Asian Games appearances (overview)
- 1978; 1982; 1986; 1990; 1994; 1998; 2002; 2006; 2010; 2014; 2018; 2022; 2026

Qatar participated in the 2002 Asian Games held in Busan, South Korea, from September 29 to October 14, 2002. Athletes from Qatar won overall 17 medals (including four golds), and clinched 17th spot in the medal table.
