= Taekwondo at the 2002 Asian Games =

Taekwondo competition

- Venue: Gudeok Gymnasium
- Dates: 10–13 October 2002
- Competitors: 219 from 35 nations

Taekwondo took place from October 10 to October 13 at the 2002 Asian Games in Busan, South Korea. Men's and women's competitions held in eight weight categories for each. All competition took place at the Gudeok Gymnasium. Each country except the host nation was limited to having 6 men and 6 women.

== Schedule ==
P	Preliminary rounds	F	Final

Event↓/Date →	10th Thu		11th Fri		12th Sat		13th Sun	
Men's 54 kg	P	F						
Men's 58 kg			P	F				
Men's 62 kg					P	F		
Men's 67 kg							P	F
Men's 72 kg	P	F						
Men's 78 kg			P	F				
Men's 84 kg					P	F		
Men's +84 kg							P	F
Women's 47 kg	P	F						
Women's 51 kg			P	F				
Women's 55 kg					P	F		
Women's 59 kg							P	F
Women's 63 kg	P	F						
Women's 67 kg			P	F				
Women's 72 kg					P	F		
Women's +72 kg							P	F

== Medalists ==
=== Men ===
Event	Gold	Silver	Bronze
Finweight (−54 kg)	Park Hee-chul; South Korea	Chu Mu-yen; Chinese Taipei	Muhammad Dalam Imam; Indonesia
Finweight (−54 kg)	Park Hee-chul; South Korea	Chu Mu-yen; Chinese Taipei	Akram Al-Noor; Yemen
Flyweight (−58 kg)	Kim Dae-ryung; South Korea	Behzad Khodadad; Iran	Surendra Bhandari; India
Flyweight (−58 kg)	Kim Dae-ryung; South Korea	Behzad Khodadad; Iran	Tshomlee Go; Philippines
Bantamweight (−62 kg)	Huang Chih-hsiung; Chinese Taipei	Kim Hyang-soo; South Korea	Ali Al-Asmar; Jordan
Bantamweight (−62 kg)	Huang Chih-hsiung; Chinese Taipei	Kim Hyang-soo; South Korea	Ghali Al-Matrafi; Saudi Arabia
Featherweight (−67 kg)	Nam Yeon-sik; South Korea	Sung Yu-chi; Chinese Taipei	Pavel Yugay; Uzbekistan
Featherweight (−67 kg)	Nam Yeon-sik; South Korea	Sung Yu-chi; Chinese Taipei	Deepak Bista; Nepal
Lightweight (−72 kg)	Hadi Saei; Iran	Lee Jae-shin; South Korea	Yesbol Yerden; Kazakhstan
Lightweight (−72 kg)	Hadi Saei; Iran	Lee Jae-shin; South Korea	Iyad Al-Saify; Jordan
Welterweight (−78 kg)	Oh Seon-taek; South Korea	Đinh Vương Duy; Vietnam	Majid Aflaki; Iran
Welterweight (−78 kg)	Oh Seon-taek; South Korea	Đinh Vương Duy; Vietnam	Liu Yang; China
Middleweight (−84 kg)	Kim Kyong-hun; South Korea	Phan Tấn Đạt; Vietnam	Dindo Simpao; Philippines
Middleweight (−84 kg)	Kim Kyong-hun; South Korea	Phan Tấn Đạt; Vietnam	Arman Chilmanov; Kazakhstan
Heavyweight (+84 kg)	Moon Dae-sung; South Korea	Nguyễn Văn Hùng; Vietnam	Abdulqader Al-Adhami; Qatar
Heavyweight (+84 kg)	Moon Dae-sung; South Korea	Nguyễn Văn Hùng; Vietnam	Ahmad Al-Attar; Kuwait

=== Women ===
Event	Gold	Silver	Bronze
Finweight (−47 kg)	Chen Shih-hsin; Chinese Taipei	Nguyễn Thị Huyền Diệu; Vietnam	Wang Ying; China
Finweight (−47 kg)	Chen Shih-hsin; Chinese Taipei	Nguyễn Thị Huyền Diệu; Vietnam	Kang Ji-hyun; South Korea
Flyweight (−51 kg)	Lim Su-jeong; South Korea	Yaowapa Boorapolchai; Thailand	Juana Wangsa Putri; Indonesia
Flyweight (−51 kg)	Lim Su-jeong; South Korea	Yaowapa Boorapolchai; Thailand	Daleen Cordero; Philippines
Bantamweight (−55 kg)	Yun Kyung-rim; South Korea	Chonnapas Premwaew; Thailand	Parvaneh Tehrani; Iran
Bantamweight (−55 kg)	Yun Kyung-rim; South Korea	Chonnapas Premwaew; Thailand	Renuka Magar; Nepal
Featherweight (−59 kg)	Yun Sung-hee; South Korea	Tseng Pei-hua; Chinese Taipei	Lê Thị Nhung; Vietnam
Featherweight (−59 kg)	Yun Sung-hee; South Korea	Tseng Pei-hua; Chinese Taipei	Wang Shuo; China
Lightweight (−63 kg)	Kim Yeon-ji; South Korea	Liu Lin; China	Lee Pei Fen; Malaysia
Lightweight (−63 kg)	Kim Yeon-ji; South Korea	Liu Lin; China	Ritu Jimee Rai; Nepal
Welterweight (−67 kg)	Kim Su-ok; South Korea	Chang Wan-chen; Chinese Taipei	Luo Wei; China
Welterweight (−67 kg)	Kim Su-ok; South Korea	Chang Wan-chen; Chinese Taipei	Veronica Domingo; Philippines
Middleweight (−72 kg)	Choi Jin-mi; South Korea	Chen Zhong; China	Roia Zamani; Afghanistan
Middleweight (−72 kg)	Choi Jin-mi; South Korea	Chen Zhong; China	Sally Solis; Philippines
Heavyweight (+72 kg)	Wang I-hsien; Chinese Taipei	Youn Hyun-jung; South Korea	Lee Wan Yuen; Malaysia
Heavyweight (+72 kg)	Wang I-hsien; Chinese Taipei	Youn Hyun-jung; South Korea	Ren Ruihong; China

== Medal table ==
Rank	Nation	Gold	Silver	Bronze	Total
1	South Korea (KOR)	12	3	1	16
2	Chinese Taipei (TPE)	3	4	0	7
3	Iran (IRI)	1	1	2	4
4	Vietnam (VIE)	0	4	1	5
5	China (CHN)	0	2	5	7
6	Thailand (THA)	0	2	0	2
7	Philippines (PHI)	0	0	5	5
8	Nepal (NEP)	0	0	3	3
9	Indonesia (INA)	0	0	2	2
9	Jordan (JOR)	0	0	2	2
9	Kazakhstan (KAZ)	0	0	2	2
9	Malaysia (MAS)	0	0	2	2
13	Afghanistan (AFG)	0	0	1	1
13	India (IND)	0	0	1	1
13	Kuwait (KUW)	0	0	1	1
13	Qatar (QAT)	0	0	1	1
13	Saudi Arabia (KSA)	0	0	1	1
13	Uzbekistan (UZB)	0	0	1	1
13	Yemen (YEM)	0	0	1	1
Totals (19 entries)		16	16	32	64

== Participating nations ==
A total of 219 athletes from 35 nations competed in taekwondo at the 2002 Asian Games:

- Afghanistan (7)
- Bahrain (8)
- Bhutan (11)
- Cambodia (6)
- China (11)
- Chinese Taipei (12)
- Hong Kong (1)
- India (9)
- Indonesia (8)
- Iran (9)
- Jordan (5)
- Kazakhstan (6)
- Kuwait (6)
- Kyrgyzstan (4)
- Laos (3)
- Lebanon (3)
- Macau (3)
- Malaysia (5)
- Mongolia (5)
- Myanmar (3)
- Nepal (10)
- Pakistan (2)
- Palestine (4)
- Philippines (12)
- Qatar (6)
- Saudi Arabia (6)
- South Korea (16)
- Sri Lanka (1)
- Tajikistan (3)
- Thailand (8)
- Timor-Leste (1)
- Turkmenistan (4)
- Uzbekistan (5)
- Vietnam (10)
- Yemen (6)
