= List of Asian Games medalists in taekwondo =

This is the complete list of Asian Games medalists in taekwondo from 1986 to 2026.

== Men ==
=== Individual poomsae ===
Games	Gold	Silver	Bronze
2018 Jakarta–Palembang	Kang Min-sung (KOR)	Kourosh Bakhtiar (IRI)	Pongporn Suvittayarak (THA)
2018 Jakarta–Palembang	Kang Min-sung (KOR)	Kourosh Bakhtiar (IRI)	Chen Ching (TPE)
2022 Hangzhou	Kang Wan-jin (KOR)	Ma Yun-zhong (TPE)	Patrick King Perez (PHI)
2022 Hangzhou	Kang Wan-jin (KOR)	Ma Yun-zhong (TPE)	Trần Hồ Duy (VIE)
2026 Aichi–Nagoya	Yun Kyu-sung (KOR)	Navin Pinthasute (THA)	Jeus Yape (PHI)
2026 Aichi–Nagoya	Yun Kyu-sung (KOR)	Navin Pinthasute (THA)	Darren Yap (SGP)

=== Team poomsae ===
Games	Gold	Silver	Bronze
2018 Jakarta–Palembang	South Korea (KOR); Han Yeong-hun; Kim Seon-ho; Kang Wan-jin	China (CHN); Zhu Yuxiang; Hu Mingda; Deng Tingfeng	Philippines (PHI); Dustin Mella; Jeordan Dominguez; Rodolfo Reyes
2018 Jakarta–Palembang	South Korea (KOR); Han Yeong-hun; Kim Seon-ho; Kang Wan-jin	China (CHN); Zhu Yuxiang; Hu Mingda; Deng Tingfeng	Vietnam (VIE); Nguyễn Thiên Phụng; Lê Thanh Trung; Trần Tiến Khoa

=== Finweight ===
- −50 kg: 1986–1998
- −54 kg: 2002–2014

Games	Gold	Silver	Bronze
1986 Seoul	Lee Jong-sun (KOR)	Yefi Triaji (INA)	Abdullah Al-Ajmi (KUW)
1986 Seoul	Lee Jong-sun (KOR)	Yefi Triaji (INA)	Bidhan Lama (NEP)
1994 Hiroshima	Chang Jung-san (TPE)	Lugi Riyandi (INA)	Daisuke Hattori (JPN)
1994 Hiroshima	Chang Jung-san (TPE)	Lugi Riyandi (INA)	Meneef Al-Deehani (KUW)
1998 Bangkok	Park Hee-kang (KOR)	Nguyễn Duy Khương (VIE)	Kishor Shrestha (NEP)
1998 Bangkok	Park Hee-kang (KOR)	Nguyễn Duy Khương (VIE)	Wirat Pimthon (THA)
2002 Busan	Park Hee-chul (KOR)	Chu Mu-yen (TPE)	Muhammad Dalam Imam (INA)
2002 Busan	Park Hee-chul (KOR)	Chu Mu-yen (TPE)	Akram Al-Noor (YEM)
2006 Doha	Mohammad Al-Bakhit (JOR)	Vasavat Somswang (THA)	Abdulrahim Abdulhameed (BRN)
2006 Doha	Mohammad Al-Bakhit (JOR)	Vasavat Somswang (THA)	Renat Kuralbayev (KAZ)
2010 Guangzhou	Chutchawal Khawlaor (THA)	Kim Seong-ho (KOR)	Japoy Lizardo (PHI)
2010 Guangzhou	Chutchawal Khawlaor (THA)	Kim Seong-ho (KOR)	Hsu Chia-lin (TPE)
2014 Incheon	Kim Tae-hun (KOR)	Huang Yu-jen (TPE)	Molomyn Tümenbayar (MGL)
2014 Incheon	Kim Tae-hun (KOR)	Huang Yu-jen (TPE)	Ramnarong Sawekwiharee (THA)

=== Flyweight ===
- −54 kg: 1986–1998
- −58 kg: 2002–

Games	Gold	Silver	Bronze
1986 Seoul	Kim Young-sik (KOR)	Selvamuthu Ramasamy (MAL)	Budi Setiawan (INA)
1986 Seoul	Kim Young-sik (KOR)	Selvamuthu Ramasamy (MAL)	Anan Meksawan (THA)
1994 Hiroshima	Jin Seung-tae (KOR)	Mohammad Sari Al-Zoabi (JOR)	Mohammed Saddiq (KSA)
1994 Hiroshima	Jin Seung-tae (KOR)	Mohammad Sari Al-Zoabi (JOR)	Man Bahadur Shahi (NEP)
1998 Bangkok	Hồ Nhất Thống (VIE)	Satriyo Rahadhani (INA)	Anuarbek Amankulov (KAZ)
1998 Bangkok	Hồ Nhất Thống (VIE)	Satriyo Rahadhani (INA)	Rodolfo Abratique (PHI)
2002 Busan	Kim Dae-ryung (KOR)	Behzad Khodadad (IRI)	Surendra Bhandari (IND)
2002 Busan	Kim Dae-ryung (KOR)	Behzad Khodadad (IRI)	Tshomlee Go (PHI)
2006 Doha	You Young-dae (KOR)	Nattapong Tewawetchapong (THA)	Behzad Khodadad (IRI)
2006 Doha	You Young-dae (KOR)	Nattapong Tewawetchapong (THA)	Chu Mu-yen (TPE)
2010 Guangzhou	Wei Chen-yang (TPE)	Pen-ek Karaket (THA)	Xu Yongzeng (CHN)
2010 Guangzhou	Wei Chen-yang (TPE)	Pen-ek Karaket (THA)	Paul Romero (PHI)
2014 Incheon	Farzan Ashourzadeh (IRI)	Nursultan Mamayev (KAZ)	Yuma Yamada (JPN)
2014 Incheon	Farzan Ashourzadeh (IRI)	Nursultan Mamayev (KAZ)	Wei Chen-yang (TPE)
2018 Jakarta–Palembang	Kim Tae-hun (KOR)	Niyaz Pulatov (UZB)	Farzan Ashourzadeh (IRI)
2018 Jakarta–Palembang	Kim Tae-hun (KOR)	Niyaz Pulatov (UZB)	Sergio Suzuki (JPN)
2022 Hangzhou	Jang Jun (KOR)	Mehdi Haji Mousaei (IRI)	Mohsen Rezaee (AFG)
2022 Hangzhou	Jang Jun (KOR)	Mehdi Haji Mousaei (IRI)	Cheng Kai (CHN)
2026 Aichi–Nagoya	Tamirlan Tleules (KAZ)	Kurt Bryan Barbosa (PHI)	Jaafar Al-Daoud (JOR)
2026 Aichi–Nagoya	Tamirlan Tleules (KAZ)	Kurt Bryan Barbosa (PHI)	An Hyang-sik (KOR)

=== Bantamweight ===
- −58 kg: 1986–1998
- −62 kg: 2002–2006
- −63 kg: 2010–2022

Games	Gold	Silver	Bronze
1986 Seoul	Ebrahim Ghaderi (IRN)	Abdul Rozak (INA)	Tareq Lababidi (JOR)
1986 Seoul	Ebrahim Ghaderi (IRN)	Abdul Rozak (INA)	Ram Bahadur Ghachhe (NEP)
1994 Hiroshima	Trần Quang Hạ (VIE)	Alfons Lung (INA)	Hironobu Yamashita (JPN)
1994 Hiroshima	Trần Quang Hạ (VIE)	Alfons Lung (INA)	Wong Ching Beng (MAS)
1998 Bangkok	Mehdi Bibak (IRI)	Jatupol Yodanyamaneewong (THA)	Liu Chuang (CHN)
1998 Bangkok	Mehdi Bibak (IRI)	Jatupol Yodanyamaneewong (THA)	Thamer Al-Mershad (KUW)
2002 Busan	Huang Chih-hsiung (TPE)	Kim Hyang-soo (KOR)	Ali Al-Asmar (JOR)
2002 Busan	Huang Chih-hsiung (TPE)	Kim Hyang-soo (KOR)	Ghali Al-Matrafi (KSA)
2006 Doha	Kim Ju-young (KOR)	Tshomlee Go (PHI)	Su Tai-yuan (TPE)
2006 Doha	Kim Ju-young (KOR)	Tshomlee Go (PHI)	Vũ Anh Tuấn (VIE)
2010 Guangzhou	Lee Dae-hoon (KOR)	Nacha Punthong (THA)	Jawad Lakzaee (AFG)
2010 Guangzhou	Lee Dae-hoon (KOR)	Nacha Punthong (THA)	Tshomlee Go (PHI)
2014 Incheon	Lee Dae-hoon (KOR)	Akkarin Kitwijarn (THA)	Ahmad Roman Abasi (AFG)
2014 Incheon	Lee Dae-hoon (KOR)	Akkarin Kitwijarn (THA)	Chen Yen-ming (TPE)
2018 Jakarta–Palembang	Mirhashem Hosseini (IRI)	Zhao Shuai (CHN)	Cho Gang-min (KOR)
2018 Jakarta–Palembang	Mirhashem Hosseini (IRI)	Zhao Shuai (CHN)	Ho Chia-hsin (TPE)
2022 Hangzhou	Banlung Tubtimdang (THA)	Alireza Hosseinpour (IRI)	Liang Yushuai (CHN)
2022 Hangzhou	Banlung Tubtimdang (THA)	Alireza Hosseinpour (IRI)	Zaid Al-Halawani (JOR)

=== Featherweight ===
- −64 kg: 1986–1998
- −67 kg: 2002–2006
- −68 kg: 2010–

Games	Gold	Silver	Bronze
1986 Seoul	Han Jae-koo (KOR)	Samer Kamal (JOR)	Rashid Al-Owjan (QAT)
1986 Seoul	Han Jae-koo (KOR)	Samer Kamal (JOR)	Tana Sinprasat (THA)
1994 Hiroshima	Kim Hyun-yong (KOR)	Robert Vargas (PHI)	Khalid Al-Shamrani (KSA)
1994 Hiroshima	Kim Hyun-yong (KOR)	Robert Vargas (PHI)	Evgeniy Khan (UZB)
1998 Bangkok	Kang Nam-won (KOR)	Donald Geisler (PHI)	Bijan Moghanloo (IRI)
1998 Bangkok	Kang Nam-won (KOR)	Donald Geisler (PHI)	Hsu Chi-hung (TPE)
2002 Busan	Nam Yeon-sik (KOR)	Sung Yu-chi (TPE)	Deepak Bista (NEP)
2002 Busan	Nam Yeon-sik (KOR)	Sung Yu-chi (TPE)	Pavel Yugay (UZB)
2006 Doha	Song Myeong-seob (KOR)	Jamil Al-Khuffash (JOR)	Alireza Nasr Azadani (IRI)
2006 Doha	Song Myeong-seob (KOR)	Jamil Al-Khuffash (JOR)	Manuel Rivero (PHI)
2010 Guangzhou	Mohammad Bagheri Motamed (IRI)	Jang Se-wook (KOR)	Huang Jiannan (CHN)
2010 Guangzhou	Mohammad Bagheri Motamed (IRI)	Jang Se-wook (KOR)	Lo Tsung-jui (TPE)
2014 Incheon	Behnam Asbaghi (IRI)	Huang Jiannan (CHN)	Kairat Sarymsakov (KAZ)
2014 Incheon	Behnam Asbaghi (IRI)	Huang Jiannan (CHN)	Keith Sembrano (PHI)
2018 Jakarta–Palembang	Lee Dae-hoon (KOR)	Amir Mohammad Bakhshi (IRI)	Ahmad Abughaush (JOR)
2018 Jakarta–Palembang	Lee Dae-hoon (KOR)	Amir Mohammad Bakhshi (IRI)	Yerassyl Kaiyrbek (KAZ)
2022 Hangzhou	Ulugbek Rashitov (UZB)	Zaid Kareem (JOR)	Matin Rezaei (IRI)
2022 Hangzhou	Ulugbek Rashitov (UZB)	Zaid Kareem (JOR)	Jin Ho-jun (KOR)
2026 Aichi–Nagoya	Banlung Tubtimdang (THA)	Mehdi Haji Mousaei (IRI)	Zaid Kareem (JOR)
2026 Aichi–Nagoya	Banlung Tubtimdang (THA)	Mehdi Haji Mousaei (IRI)	Mun Jin-ho (KOR)

=== Lightweight ===
- −70 kg: 1986–1998
- −72 kg: 2002–2006
- −74 kg: 2010–2014

Games	Gold	Silver	Bronze
1986 Seoul	Park Bong-kwon (KOR)	Ali Hajipour (IRN)	Faraj Al-Fadhel (KUW)
1986 Seoul	Park Bong-kwon (KOR)	Ali Hajipour (IRN)	Monsour del Rosario (PHI)
1994 Hiroshima	Fariborz Askari (IRI)	Hiroyuki Yamashita (JPN)	Yousef Abu Zaid (JOR)
1994 Hiroshima	Fariborz Askari (IRI)	Hiroyuki Yamashita (JPN)	Rajendran Rajoo (MAS)
1998 Bangkok	Kim Byung-uk (KOR)	Sung Chen-hsien (TPE)	Hiroshi Kanai (JPN)
1998 Bangkok	Kim Byung-uk (KOR)	Sung Chen-hsien (TPE)	Kriangkrai Noikoed (THA)
2002 Busan	Hadi Saei (IRI)	Lee Jae-shin (KOR)	Iyad Al-Saify (JOR)
2002 Busan	Hadi Saei (IRI)	Lee Jae-shin (KOR)	Yesbol Yerden (KAZ)
2006 Doha	Lee Young-yeoul (KOR)	Wang Hao (CHN)	Nesar Ahmad Bahave (AFG)
2006 Doha	Lee Young-yeoul (KOR)	Wang Hao (CHN)	Hadi Saei (IRI)
2010 Guangzhou	Alireza Nasr Azadani (IRI)	Dmitriy Kim (UZB)	Patiwat Thongsalap (THA)
2010 Guangzhou	Alireza Nasr Azadani (IRI)	Dmitriy Kim (UZB)	Dương Thanh Tâm (VIE)
2014 Incheon	Masoud Hajji-Zavareh (IRI)	Nikita Rafalovich (UZB)	Song Young-geon (KOR)
2014 Incheon	Masoud Hajji-Zavareh (IRI)	Nikita Rafalovich (UZB)	Samuel Morrison (PHI)

=== Welterweight ===
- −76 kg: 1986–1998
- −78 kg: 2002–2006
- −80 kg: 2010–

Games	Gold	Silver	Bronze
1986 Seoul	Moon Jong-kook (KOR)	Lam Ting (INA)	Katsuhiro Oki (JPN)
1986 Seoul	Moon Jong-kook (KOR)	Lam Ting (INA)	Raj Kumar Rai (NEP)
1994 Hiroshima	Jung Kwang-chae (KOR)	Ebrahim Saadati (IRI)	Mitsushige Arita (JPN)
1994 Hiroshima	Jung Kwang-chae (KOR)	Ebrahim Saadati (IRI)	Jeetender Kumar Rai (MAS)
1998 Bangkok	Ryu Keun-moo (KOR)	Majid Aflaki (IRI)	Mohammad Al-Fararjeh (JOR)
1998 Bangkok	Ryu Keun-moo (KOR)	Majid Aflaki (IRI)	Adilkhan Sagindykov (KAZ)
2002 Busan	Oh Seon-taek (KOR)	Đinh Vương Duy (VIE)	Liu Yang (CHN)
2002 Busan	Oh Seon-taek (KOR)	Đinh Vương Duy (VIE)	Majid Aflaki (IRI)
2006 Doha	Abdulqader Hikmat (QAT)	Mehdi Bibak (IRI)	Deepak Bista (NEP)
2006 Doha	Abdulqader Hikmat (QAT)	Mehdi Bibak (IRI)	Liao Chia-hsing (TPE)
2010 Guangzhou	Nabil Talal (JOR)	Nesar Ahmad Bahave (AFG)	Zhao Lin (CHN)
2010 Guangzhou	Nabil Talal (JOR)	Nesar Ahmad Bahave (AFG)	Farzad Abdollahi (IRI)
2014 Incheon	Mehdi Khodabakhshi (IRI)	Maksim Rafalovich (UZB)	Qiao Sen (CHN)
2014 Incheon	Mehdi Khodabakhshi (IRI)	Maksim Rafalovich (UZB)	Farkhod Negmatov (TJK)
2018 Jakarta–Palembang	Nikita Rafalovich (UZB)	Lee Hwa-jun (KOR)	Saleh El-Sharabaty (JOR)
2018 Jakarta–Palembang	Nikita Rafalovich (UZB)	Lee Hwa-jun (KOR)	Nurlan Myrzabayev (KAZ)
2022 Hangzhou	Park Woo-hyeok (KOR)	Saleh El-Sharabaty (JOR)	Mehran Barkhordari (IRI)
2022 Hangzhou	Park Woo-hyeok (KOR)	Saleh El-Sharabaty (JOR)	Saif Taher (IRQ)
2026 Aichi–Nagoya	Jasurbek Jaysunov (UZB)	Hung Jiun-yi (TPE)	Saleh El-Sharabaty (JOR)
2026 Aichi–Nagoya	Jasurbek Jaysunov (UZB)	Hung Jiun-yi (TPE)	Batyrkhan Toleugali (KAZ)

=== Middleweight ===
- −83 kg: 1986–1998
- −84 kg: 2002–2006
- −87 kg: 2010–2014

Games	Gold	Silver	Bronze
1986 Seoul	Lee Kye-haeng (KOR)	Ahmad Ali (JOR)	Hirokazu Shiokawa (JPN)
1986 Seoul	Lee Kye-haeng (KOR)	Ahmad Ali (JOR)	Raj Kumar Buchhe (NEP)
1994 Hiroshima	Hamid Gholoum (KUW)	Ammar Fahed Sbeihi (JOR)	Andri Halim (INA)
1994 Hiroshima	Hamid Gholoum (KUW)	Ammar Fahed Sbeihi (JOR)	Majid Amintorabi (IRI)
1998 Bangkok	Kang Dong-kuk (KOR)	Hussein Al-Tahleh (JOR)	Majid Amintorabi (IRI)
1998 Bangkok	Kang Dong-kuk (KOR)	Hussein Al-Tahleh (JOR)	Prawes Sattakom (THA)
2002 Busan	Kim Kyong-hun (KOR)	Phan Tấn Đạt (VIE)	Arman Chilmanov (KAZ)
2002 Busan	Kim Kyong-hun (KOR)	Phan Tấn Đạt (VIE)	Dindo Simpao (PHI)
2006 Doha	Yousef Karami (IRI)	Park Kyeong-hoon (KOR)	Arman Chilmanov (KAZ)
2006 Doha	Yousef Karami (IRI)	Park Kyeong-hoon (KOR)	Shokirjon Rajabov (TJK)
2010 Guangzhou	Yousef Karami (IRI)	Park Yong-hyun (KOR)	Yin Zhimeng (CHN)
2010 Guangzhou	Yousef Karami (IRI)	Park Yong-hyun (KOR)	Nguyễn Trọng Cường (VIE)
2014 Incheon	Jasur Baykuziyev (UZB)	Chen Linglong (CHN)	Shin Yeong-rae (KOR)
2014 Incheon	Jasur Baykuziyev (UZB)	Chen Linglong (CHN)	Nattapat Tantramart (THA)

=== Heavyweight ===
- +83 kg: 1986–1998
- +84 kg: 2002–2006
- +87 kg: 2010–2014
- +80 kg: 2018–

Games	Gold	Silver	Bronze
1986 Seoul	Kang Seung-woo (KOR)	Tawfiq Nwaiser (JOR)	Rashid Hassan Bado (BRN)
1986 Seoul	Kang Seung-woo (KOR)	Tawfiq Nwaiser (JOR)	Ali Mohamed Salah (QAT)
1994 Hiroshima	Kim Je-kyoung (KOR)	Farzad Zarakhsh (IRI)	Tawfiq Nwaiser (JOR)
1994 Hiroshima	Kim Je-kyoung (KOR)	Farzad Zarakhsh (IRI)	Wu Pao-yi (TPE)
1998 Bangkok	Kim Je-kyoung (KOR)	Ibrahim Aqil (JOR)	Hassan Aslani (IRI)
1998 Bangkok	Kim Je-kyoung (KOR)	Ibrahim Aqil (JOR)	Nguyễn Văn Hùng (VIE)
2002 Busan	Moon Dae-sung (KOR)	Nguyễn Văn Hùng (VIE)	Ahmad Al-Attar (KUW)
2002 Busan	Moon Dae-sung (KOR)	Nguyễn Văn Hùng (VIE)	Abdulqader Al-Adhami (QAT)
2006 Doha	Kim Hak-hwan (KOR)	Mehdi Navaei (IRI)	Liu Xiaobo (CHN)
2006 Doha	Kim Hak-hwan (KOR)	Mehdi Navaei (IRI)	Abdulqader Al-Adhami (QAT)
2010 Guangzhou	Heo Jun-nyung (KOR)	Zheng Yi (CHN)	Arman Chilmanov (KAZ)
2010 Guangzhou	Heo Jun-nyung (KOR)	Zheng Yi (CHN)	Akmal Irgashev (UZB)
2014 Incheon	Jo Chol-ho (KOR)	Dmitriy Shokin (UZB)	Elias El-Hidari (LIB)
2014 Incheon	Jo Chol-ho (KOR)	Dmitriy Shokin (UZB)	Alisher Gulov (TJK)
2018 Jakarta–Palembang	Saeid Rajabi (IRI)	Dmitriy Shokin (UZB)	Hamza Kattan (JOR)
2018 Jakarta–Palembang	Saeid Rajabi (IRI)	Dmitriy Shokin (UZB)	Ruslan Zhaparov (KAZ)
2022 Hangzhou	Song Zhaoxiang (CHN)	Arian Salimi (IRI)	Smaiyl Duisebay (KAZ)
2022 Hangzhou	Song Zhaoxiang (CHN)	Arian Salimi (IRI)	Lee Meng-en (TPE)
2026 Aichi–Nagoya	Arian Salimi (IRI)	Marat Mavlonov (UZB)	Mohammad Al-Adarbi (JOR)
2026 Aichi–Nagoya	Arian Salimi (IRI)	Marat Mavlonov (UZB)	Kang Sang-hyun (KOR)

== Women ==
=== Individual poomsae ===
Games	Gold	Silver	Bronze
2018 Jakarta–Palembang	Defia Rosmaniar (INA)	Marjan Salahshouri (IRI)	Yun Ji-hye (KOR)
2018 Jakarta–Palembang	Defia Rosmaniar (INA)	Marjan Salahshouri (IRI)	Yap Khim Wen (MAS)
2022 Hangzhou	Cha Yea-eun (KOR)	Yuiko Niwa (JPN)	Marjan Salahshouri (IRI)
2022 Hangzhou	Cha Yea-eun (KOR)	Yuiko Niwa (JPN)	Chen Hsin-ya (TPE)
2026 Aichi–Nagoya	Jung Ha-eun (KOR)	Juliana Candelaria (PHI)	Yuiko Niwa (JPN)
2026 Aichi–Nagoya	Jung Ha-eun (KOR)	Juliana Candelaria (PHI)	Thitaree Kaewolanwasu (THA)

=== Team poomsae ===
Games	Gold	Silver	Bronze
2018 Jakarta–Palembang	Thailand (THA); Kotchawan Chomchuen; Phenkanya Phaisankiattikun; Ornawee Srisahakit	South Korea (KOR); Gwak Yeo-won; Choi Dong-ah; Park Jae-eun	Philippines (PHI); Juvenile Crisostomo; Rinna Babanto; Janna Oliva
2018 Jakarta–Palembang	Thailand (THA); Kotchawan Chomchuen; Phenkanya Phaisankiattikun; Ornawee Srisahakit	South Korea (KOR); Gwak Yeo-won; Choi Dong-ah; Park Jae-eun	Chinese Taipei (TPE); Chen Hsiang-ting; Chen Yi-hsuan; Lin Kan-yu

=== Finweight ===
- −43 kg: 1998
- −47 kg: 2002–2006
- −46 kg: 2010–2014

Games	Gold	Silver	Bronze
1998 Bangkok	Jang Jung-eun (KOR)	Nguyễn Thị Xuân Mai (VIE)	Li Huang (CHN)
1998 Bangkok	Jang Jung-eun (KOR)	Nguyễn Thị Xuân Mai (VIE)	Chi Shu-ju (TPE)
2002 Busan	Chen Shih-hsin (TPE)	Nguyễn Thị Huyền Diệu (VIE)	Wang Ying (CHN)
2002 Busan	Chen Shih-hsin (TPE)	Nguyễn Thị Huyền Diệu (VIE)	Kang Ji-hyun (KOR)
2006 Doha	Wu Jingyu (CHN)	Yang Shu-chun (TPE)	Eunice Alora (PHI)
2006 Doha	Wu Jingyu (CHN)	Yang Shu-chun (TPE)	Yaowapa Boorapolchai (THA)
2010 Guangzhou	Huang Hsien-yung (TPE)	Dana Haidar (JOR)	Fransisca Valentina (INA)
2010 Guangzhou	Huang Hsien-yung (TPE)	Dana Haidar (JOR)	Sara Khoshjamal Fekri (IRI)
2014 Incheon	Kim So-hui (KOR)	Lin Wan-ting (TPE)	Anjelay Pelaez (PHI)
2014 Incheon	Kim So-hui (KOR)	Lin Wan-ting (TPE)	Panipak Wongpattanakit (THA)

=== Flyweight ===
- −47 kg: 1998
- −51 kg: 2002–2006
- −49 kg: 2010–

Games	Gold	Silver	Bronze
1998 Bangkok	Tang Hui-wen (TPE)	Usa Sinlapajarn (THA)	Yuan Guiru (CHN)
1998 Bangkok	Tang Hui-wen (TPE)	Usa Sinlapajarn (THA)	Juana Wangsa Putri (INA)
2002 Busan	Lim Su-jeong (KOR)	Yaowapa Boorapolchai (THA)	Juana Wangsa Putri (INA)
2002 Busan	Lim Su-jeong (KOR)	Yaowapa Boorapolchai (THA)	Daleen Cordero (PHI)
2006 Doha	Kwon Eun-kyung (KOR)	Wu Yen-ni (TPE)	Natthaya Sangsasiton (THA)
2006 Doha	Kwon Eun-kyung (KOR)	Wu Yen-ni (TPE)	Đỗ Thị Bích Hạnh (VIE)
2010 Guangzhou	Wu Jingyu (CHN)	Erika Kasahara (JPN)	Chanatip Sonkham (THA)
2010 Guangzhou	Wu Jingyu (CHN)	Erika Kasahara (JPN)	Vũ Thị Hậu (VIE)
2014 Incheon	Chanatip Sonkham (THA)	Li Zhaoyi (CHN)	Ronna Ilao (PHI)
2014 Incheon	Chanatip Sonkham (THA)	Li Zhaoyi (CHN)	Sun Huei-ning (TPE)
2018 Jakarta–Palembang	Panipak Wongpattanakit (THA)	Madinabonu Mannopova (UZB)	Nahid Kiani (IRI)
2018 Jakarta–Palembang	Panipak Wongpattanakit (THA)	Madinabonu Mannopova (UZB)	Miyu Yamada (JPN)
2022 Hangzhou	Panipak Wongpattanakit (THA)	Guo Qing (CHN)	Mobina Nematzadeh (IRI)
2022 Hangzhou	Panipak Wongpattanakit (THA)	Guo Qing (CHN)	Madinabonu Mannopova (UZB)
2026 Aichi–Nagoya	Ma Jingyue (CHN)	Tachiana Mangin (PHI)	Ruka Okamoto (JPN)
2026 Aichi–Nagoya	Ma Jingyue (CHN)	Tachiana Mangin (PHI)	Patcharakan Poolkerd (THA)

=== Bantamweight ===
- −51 kg: 1998
- −55 kg: 2002–2006
- −53 kg: 2010–2022

Games	Gold	Silver	Bronze
1998 Bangkok	Lee Ji-won (KOR)	Nootcharin Sukkhongdumnoen (THA)	Sapana Malla (NEP)
1998 Bangkok	Lee Ji-won (KOR)	Nootcharin Sukkhongdumnoen (THA)	Trần Hiếu Ngân (VIE)
2002 Busan	Yun Kyung-rim (KOR)	Chonnapas Premwaew (THA)	Parvaneh Tehrani (IRI)
2002 Busan	Yun Kyung-rim (KOR)	Chonnapas Premwaew (THA)	Renuka Magar (NEP)
2006 Doha	Kim Bo-hye (KOR)	Hoàng Hà Giang (VIE)	Saule Sardarova (KAZ)
2006 Doha	Kim Bo-hye (KOR)	Hoàng Hà Giang (VIE)	Cosette Basbous (LIB)
2010 Guangzhou	Sarita Phongsri (THA)	Nguyễn Thị Hoài Thu (VIE)	Samaneh Sheshpari (IRI)
2010 Guangzhou	Sarita Phongsri (THA)	Nguyễn Thị Hoài Thu (VIE)	Kwon Eun-kyung (KOR)
2014 Incheon	Huang Yun-wen (TPE)	Yoon Jeong-yeon (KOR)	Wu Jingyu (CHN)
2014 Incheon	Huang Yun-wen (TPE)	Yoon Jeong-yeon (KOR)	Sousan Hajipour (IRI)
2018 Jakarta–Palembang	Su Po-ya (TPE)	Ha Min-ah (KOR)	Fariza Aldangorova (KAZ)
2018 Jakarta–Palembang	Su Po-ya (TPE)	Ha Min-ah (KOR)	Laetitia Aoun (LBN)
2022 Hangzhou	Park Hye-jin (KOR)	Lin Wei-chun (TPE)	Chutikan Jongkolrattanawattana (THA)
2022 Hangzhou	Park Hye-jin (KOR)	Lin Wei-chun (TPE)	Charos Kayumova (UZB)

=== Featherweight ===
- −55 kg: 1998
- −59 kg: 2002–2006
- −57 kg: 2010–

Games	Gold	Silver	Bronze
1998 Bangkok	Chen Yi-an (TPE)	Sabita Rajbhandari (NEP)	Soo Lai Yin (MAS)
1998 Bangkok	Chen Yi-an (TPE)	Sabita Rajbhandari (NEP)	Raveevadee Pansombut (THA)
2002 Busan	Yun Sung-hee (KOR)	Tseng Pei-hua (TPE)	Wang Shuo (CHN)
2002 Busan	Yun Sung-hee (KOR)	Tseng Pei-hua (TPE)	Lê Thị Nhung (VIE)
2006 Doha	Lee Sung-hye (KOR)	Nguyễn Thị Hoài Thu (VIE)	Ayasha Shakya (NEP)
2006 Doha	Lee Sung-hye (KOR)	Nguyễn Thị Hoài Thu (VIE)	Tseng Pei-hua (TPE)
2010 Guangzhou	Lee Sung-hye (KOR)	Hou Yuzhuo (CHN)	Sousan Hajipour (IRI)
2010 Guangzhou	Lee Sung-hye (KOR)	Hou Yuzhuo (CHN)	Andrea Paoli (LIB)
2014 Incheon	Lee Ah-reum (KOR)	Mayu Hamada (JPN)	Wang Yun (CHN)
2014 Incheon	Lee Ah-reum (KOR)	Mayu Hamada (JPN)	Rangsiya Nisaisom (THA)
2018 Jakarta–Palembang	Luo Zongshi (CHN)	Lee Ah-reum (KOR)	Pauline Lopez (PHI)
2018 Jakarta–Palembang	Luo Zongshi (CHN)	Lee Ah-reum (KOR)	Vipawan Siripornpermsak (THA)
2022 Hangzhou	Luo Zongshi (CHN)	Lo Chia-ling (TPE)	Kim Yu-jin (KOR)
2022 Hangzhou	Luo Zongshi (CHN)	Lo Chia-ling (TPE)	Phannapa Harnsujin (THA)
2026 Aichi–Nagoya	Fadia Khirfan (JOR)	Zhang Chuling (CHN)	Natkamon Wassana (THA)
2026 Aichi–Nagoya	Fadia Khirfan (JOR)	Zhang Chuling (CHN)	Lin Wei-chun (TPE)

=== Lightweight ===
- −60 kg: 1998
- −63 kg: 2002–2006
- −62 kg: 2010–2014

Games	Gold	Silver	Bronze
1998 Bangkok	Hsu Chih-ling (TPE)	Lee Sun-hee (KOR)	Yoriko Okamoto (JPN)
1998 Bangkok	Hsu Chih-ling (TPE)	Lee Sun-hee (KOR)	Nelia Sy (PHI)
2002 Busan	Kim Yeon-ji (KOR)	Liu Lin (CHN)	Lee Pei Fen (MAS)
2002 Busan	Kim Yeon-ji (KOR)	Liu Lin (CHN)	Ritu Jimee Rai (NEP)
2006 Doha	Su Li-wen (TPE)	Chonnapas Premwaew (THA)	Manita Shahi (NEP)
2006 Doha	Su Li-wen (TPE)	Chonnapas Premwaew (THA)	Veronica Domingo (PHI)
2010 Guangzhou	Noh Eun-sil (KOR)	Raheleh Asemani (IRI)	Dhunyanun Premwaew (THA)
2010 Guangzhou	Noh Eun-sil (KOR)	Raheleh Asemani (IRI)	Chang Chiung-fang (TPE)
2014 Incheon	Lee Da-bin (KOR)	Zhang Hua (CHN)	Chuang Chia-chia (TPE)
2014 Incheon	Lee Da-bin (KOR)	Zhang Hua (CHN)	Phạm Thị Thu Hiền (VIE)

=== Welterweight ===
- −65 kg: 1998
- −67 kg: 2002–

Games	Gold	Silver	Bronze
1998 Bangkok	Cho Hyang-mi (KOR)	Alaa Kutkut (JOR)	Chen Zhong (CHN)
1998 Bangkok	Cho Hyang-mi (KOR)	Alaa Kutkut (JOR)	Kao Ching-yi (TPE)
2002 Busan	Kim Su-ok (KOR)	Chang Wan-chen (TPE)	Luo Wei (CHN)
2002 Busan	Kim Su-ok (KOR)	Chang Wan-chen (TPE)	Veronica Domingo (PHI)
2006 Doha	Hwang Kyung-seon (KOR)	Toni Rivero (PHI)	Jiang Lingling (CHN)
2006 Doha	Hwang Kyung-seon (KOR)	Toni Rivero (PHI)	Bùi Thu Hiền (VIE)
2010 Guangzhou	Guo Yunfei (CHN)	Parisa Farshidi (IRI)	Gulnafis Aitmukhambetova (KAZ)
2010 Guangzhou	Guo Yunfei (CHN)	Parisa Farshidi (IRI)	Kang Bo-hyeon (KOR)
2014 Incheon	Guo Yunfei (CHN)	Lee Won-jin (KOR)	Liu Qing (MAC)
2014 Incheon	Guo Yunfei (CHN)	Lee Won-jin (KOR)	Hà Thị Nguyên (VIE)
2018 Jakarta–Palembang	Julyana Al-Sadeq (JOR)	Kim Jan-di (KOR)	Zhang Mengyu (CHN)
2018 Jakarta–Palembang	Julyana Al-Sadeq (JOR)	Kim Jan-di (KOR)	Nigora Tursunkulova (UZB)
2022 Hangzhou	Song Jie (CHN)	Feruza Sadikova (UZB)	Melika Mirhosseini (IRI)
2022 Hangzhou	Song Jie (CHN)	Feruza Sadikova (UZB)	Bạc Thị Khiêm (VIE)
2026 Aichi–Nagoya	Saghar Moradi (IRI)	Ozoda Sobirjonova (UZB)	Kwak Min-ju (KOR)
2026 Aichi–Nagoya	Saghar Moradi (IRI)	Ozoda Sobirjonova (UZB)	Wang Wei-chia (TPE)

=== Middleweight ===
- −70 kg: 1998
- −72 kg: 2002–2006
- −73 kg: 2010–2014

Games	Gold	Silver	Bronze
1998 Bangkok	Lee Hee-young (KOR)	He Lumin (CHN)	Sivaporn Meyer (THA)
1998 Bangkok	Lee Hee-young (KOR)	He Lumin (CHN)	Khúc Liễu Châu (VIE)
2002 Busan	Choi Jin-mi (KOR)	Chen Zhong (CHN)	Roia Zamani (AFG)
2002 Busan	Choi Jin-mi (KOR)	Chen Zhong (CHN)	Sally Solis (PHI)
2006 Doha	Luo Wei (CHN)	Alaa Kutkut (JOR)	Mahrouz Saei (IRI)
2006 Doha	Luo Wei (CHN)	Alaa Kutkut (JOR)	Lee In-jong (KOR)
2010 Guangzhou	Luo Wei (CHN)	Feruza Yergeshova (KAZ)	Kirstie Alora (PHI)
2010 Guangzhou	Luo Wei (CHN)	Feruza Yergeshova (KAZ)	Rapatkorn Prasopsuk (THA)
2014 Incheon	Sorn Seavmey (CAM)	Fatemeh Rouhani (IRI)	Abrar Al-Fahad (KUW)
2014 Incheon	Sorn Seavmey (CAM)	Fatemeh Rouhani (IRI)	Kirstie Alora (PHI)

=== Heavyweight ===
- +70 kg: 1998
- +72 kg: 2002–2006
- +73 kg: 2010–2014
- +67 kg: 2018–

Games	Gold	Silver	Bronze
1998 Bangkok	Jung Myoung-sook (KOR)	Lee Wan Yuen (MAS)	Sinta Berliana Heru (INA)
1998 Bangkok	Jung Myoung-sook (KOR)	Lee Wan Yuen (MAS)	Margarita Bonifacio (PHI)
2002 Busan	Wang I-hsien (TPE)	Youn Hyun-jung (KOR)	Ren Ruihong (CHN)
2002 Busan	Wang I-hsien (TPE)	Youn Hyun-jung (KOR)	Lee Wan Yuen (MAS)
2006 Doha	Chen Zhong (CHN)	Evgeniya Karimova (UZB)	Amalia Kurniasih Palupi (INA)
2006 Doha	Chen Zhong (CHN)	Evgeniya Karimova (UZB)	Afsaneh Sheikhi (IRI)
2010 Guangzhou	Liu Rui (CHN)	Oh Jung-ah (KOR)	Nadin Dawani (JOR)
2010 Guangzhou	Liu Rui (CHN)	Oh Jung-ah (KOR)	Evgeniya Karimova (UZB)
2014 Incheon	Li Donghua (CHN)	Akram Khodabandeh (IRI)	Wang Junnan (MAC)
2014 Incheon	Li Donghua (CHN)	Akram Khodabandeh (IRI)	Mokhru Khalimova (TJK)
2018 Jakarta–Palembang	Lee Da-bin (KOR)	Cansel Deniz (KAZ)	Gao Pan (CHN)
2018 Jakarta–Palembang	Lee Da-bin (KOR)	Cansel Deniz (KAZ)	Svetlana Osipova (UZB)
2022 Hangzhou	Zhou Zeqi (CHN)	Lee Da-bin (KOR)	Cansel Deniz (KAZ)
2022 Hangzhou	Zhou Zeqi (CHN)	Lee Da-bin (KOR)	Svetlana Osipova (UZB)
2026 Aichi–Nagoya	Song Da-bin (KOR)	Mu Wenzhe (CHN)	Fatemeh Ahmadi (IRI)
2026 Aichi–Nagoya	Song Da-bin (KOR)	Mu Wenzhe (CHN)	Svetlana Saidova (UZB)

== Mixed ==
=== Team ===
Games	Gold	Silver	Bronze
2022 Hangzhou	China (CHN); Cui Yang; Song Zhaoxiang; Song Jie; Zhou Zeqi	South Korea (KOR); Park Woo-hyeok; Seo Geon-woo; Kim Jan-di; Lee Da-bin	Uzbekistan (UZB); Jasurbek Jaysunov; Shukhrat Salaev; Svetlana Osipova; Ozoda Sobirjonova
2022 Hangzhou	China (CHN); Cui Yang; Song Zhaoxiang; Song Jie; Zhou Zeqi	South Korea (KOR); Park Woo-hyeok; Seo Geon-woo; Kim Jan-di; Lee Da-bin	Vietnam (VIE); Lý Hồng Phúc; Phạm Minh Bảo Kha; Bạc Thị Khiêm; Phạm Ngọc Châm

=== Virtual ===
Games	Gold	Silver	Bronze
2026 Aichi–Nagoya	Jeus Yape (PHI)	Châu Ngọc Tuyết Sang (VIE)	Rita Bakisheva (KAZ)
2026 Aichi–Nagoya	Jeus Yape (PHI)	Châu Ngọc Tuyết Sang (VIE)	Darren Yap (SGP)
