= Taekwondo at the 2002 Asian Games – Women's 63 kg =

Taekwondo competition

Women's 63 kg at the 2002 Asian Games
- Venue: Gudeok Gymnasium
- Date: 10 October 2002
- Competitors: 8 from 8 nations

Medalists
gold medal	Kim Yeon-ji	South Korea
silver medal	Liu Lin	China
bronze medal	Lee Pei Fen	Malaysia
bronze medal	Ritu Jimee Rai	Nepal

The women's lightweight (−63 kilograms) event at the 2002 Asian Games took place on October 10, 2002, at Gudeok Gymnasium, Busan, South Korea.

== Schedule ==
All times are Korea Standard Time (UTC+09:00)

Date	Time	Event
Thursday, 10 October 2002	14:00	Round 1
Thursday, 10 October 2002	14:00	Semifinals
Thursday, 10 October 2002	19:50	Final

== Results ==
Legend

- DQ — Won by disqualification
- R — Won by referee stop contest

Round 1		Semifinals		Final
Sangay Wangmo (BHU)	0
Kim Yeon-ji (KOR)	6	Kim Yeon-ji (KOR)	6
Fatima Hamidi (AFG)	0	Lee Pei Fen (MAS)	0
Lee Pei Fen (MAS)	8^{R}			Kim Yeon-ji (KOR)	10
Liu Lin (CHN)	3			Liu Lin (CHN)	6
Su Li-wen (TPE)	0	Liu Lin (CHN)	7
Nadin Dawani (JOR)		Ritu Jimee Rai (NEP)	0
Ritu Jimee Rai (NEP)	DQ
