= Taekwondo at the 2002 Asian Games – Men's 62 kg =

Taekwondo competition

Men's 62 kg at the 2002 Asian Games
- Venue: Gudeok Gymnasium
- Date: 12 October 2002
- Competitors: 25 from 25 nations

Medalists
gold medal	Huang Chih-hsiung	Chinese Taipei
silver medal	Kim Hyang-soo	South Korea
bronze medal	Ali Al-Asmar	Jordan
bronze medal	Ghali Al-Matrafi	Saudi Arabia

The men's bantamweight (−62 kilograms) event at the 2002 Asian Games took place on 12 October 2002 at Gudeok Gymnasium, Busan, South Korea.

== Schedule ==
All times are Korea Standard Time (UTC+09:00)

Date	Time	Event
Saturday, 12 October 2002	14:00	Round 1
Saturday, 12 October 2002	14:00	Round 2
Saturday, 12 October 2002	14:00	Round 3
Saturday, 12 October 2002	14:00	Semifinals
Saturday, 12 October 2002	19:00	Final

== Results ==
Legend

- DQ — Won by disqualification
- R — Won by referee stop contest

=== Final ===
Final
Kim Hyang-soo (KOR)	4
Huang Chih-hsiung (TPE)	5

=== Top half ===
Round 1
Fahad Ahmed (QAT)	4
Bout Vichet (CAM)	6
Vũ Anh Tuấn (VIE)	4
Hani Al-Shamari (KUW)	4
Kim Hyang-soo (KOR)	DQ
Adel Al-Moqbeli (YEM)
Mohammed Imran (IND)	14^{R}
Sainkhishigiin Ariunbold (MGL)	4
Manuel Rivero (PHI)	15
Ali Al-Asmar (JOR)	19

Round 2
Omid Gholamzadeh (IRI)	7
Bout Vichet (CAM)	3
Vũ Anh Tuấn (VIE)	2
Kim Hyang-soo (KOR)	7
Kusung Wangdi (BHU)	1
Mohammed Imran (IND)	11
Ali Al-Asmar (JOR)	5
Derry Dharmansyah Maulana (INA)	3

Round 3
Omid Gholamzadeh (IRI)	5
Kim Hyang-soo (KOR)	7
Mohammed Imran (IND)	10
Ali Al-Asmar (JOR)	17

Semifinals
Kim Hyang-soo (KOR)	5
Ali Al-Asmar (JOR)	1

=== Bottom half ===
Round 1
Rashid Ahmedov (UZB)	1
Ziaullah Aimal (AFG)	1
Ghali Al-Matrafi (KSA)	4
Halnazar Meredaliýew (TKM)	0
Benjamin Raj Anthonysamy (MAS)	4
Wichit Sittikun (THA)	4
Kairat Duisenov (KAZ)	0
Huang Chih-hsiung (TPE)	11

Round 2
Nirmal Shrestha (NEP)	8
Rashid Ahmedov (UZB)	3
Ghali Al-Matrafi (KSA)	10
Amith Sihalat (LAO)	5
Alaa Hasan (BRN)	3
Wichit Sittikun (THA)	10
Huang Chih-hsiung (TPE)	11
Moaed Abdelwahab (PLE)	0

Round 3
Nirmal Shrestha (NEP)	2
Ghali Al-Matrafi (KSA)	5
Wichit Sittikun (THA)	2
Huang Chih-hsiung (TPE)	9

Semifinals
Ghali Al-Matrafi (KSA)	3
Huang Chih-hsiung (TPE)	8
