= Taekwondo at the 2002 Asian Games – Women's 72 kg =

Taekwondo competition

Women's 72 kg at the 2002 Asian Games
- Venue: Gudeok Gymnasium
- Date: 12 October 2002
- Competitors: 5 from 5 nations

Medalists
gold medal	Choi Jin-mi	South Korea
silver medal	Chen Zhong	China
bronze medal	Roia Zamani	Afghanistan
bronze medal	Sally Solis	Philippines

The women's middleweight (−72 kilograms) event at the 2002 Asian Games took place on October 12, 2002 at Gudeok Gymnasium, Busan, South Korea.

== Schedule ==
All times are Korea Standard Time (UTC+09:00)

Date	Time	Event
Saturday, 12 October 2002	14:00	Round 1
Saturday, 12 October 2002	14:00	Semifinals
Saturday, 12 October 2002	19:50	Final

== Results ==
Legend

- W — Won by withdrawal

Round 1		Semifinals		Final
		Roia Zamani (AFG)	0
Emerald Margareth Dien (INA)	2	Choi Jin-mi (KOR)	4^{W}
Choi Jin-mi (KOR)	4			Choi Jin-mi (KOR)	2
				Chen Zhong (CHN)	2
		Sally Solis (PHI)	2
		Chen Zhong (CHN)	4
