= Nepal at the 2002 Asian Games =

- IOC code: NEP
- NOC: Nepal Olympic Committee

in Busan
- Competitors: 50 in 10 sports
- Medals Ranked 32nd: Gold 0 Silver 0 Bronze 3 Total 3

Asian Games appearances (overview)
- 1951; 1954; 1958; 1962; 1966; 1970; 1974; 1978; 1982; 1986; 1990; 1994; 1998; 2002; 2006; 2010; 2014; 2018; 2022; 2026

Nepal participated in the 2002 Asian Games held in Busan, South Korea, from September 29 to October 14, 2002. Athletes from Nepal won overall three medals, all bronzes in the sport of taekwondo, and clinched 32nd spot in the medal table.

== Medalists ==
Medal	Name	Sport	Event
Bronze	Deepak Bista	Taekwondo	Men's featherweight (-67 kg)
Bronze	Renuka Magar	Taekwondo	Women's bantamweight (-55 kg)
Bronze	Ritu Jimee Rai	Taekwondo	Women's lightweight (-63 kg)

== Athletics ==
Nepal competed in athletics.

Key

- Note–Ranks given for track events are within the athlete's heat only
- Q = Qualified for the next round
- q = Qualified for the next round as a fastest loser or, in field events, by position without achieving the qualifying target
- qR = Qualified to the next round by referee judgement
- NR = National record
- N/A = Round not applicable for the event
- Bye = Athlete not required to compete in round

Track & road events
Men

Athlete	Event	Heat		Quarterfinal		Semifinal		Final	
Athlete	Event	Time	Rank	Time	Rank	Time	Rank	Time	Rank
Rajendra Bahadur Bhandari	5000 m	Bye						14:34.50	11
Madan Raj Giri	3000 m steeplechase	Bye						9:22.17	8
Arjun Kumar Basnet	Marathon	Bye						2:28:23	7
Yam Bahadur Pudasaini	Marathon	Bye						2:36:21	12

Field events
Men

Athlete	Event	Qualification		Final	
Athlete	Event	Distance	Position	Distance	Position
Sita Ram Mahato	Triple jump	Bye		14.59	9

== Boxing ==
Nepal competed in boxing.

Men

Athlete	Event	Preliminary 1	Preliminary 2	Quarterfinals	Semifinals	Final
Athlete	Event	Opposition Result	Opposition Result	Opposition Result	Opposition Result	Rank
Ramesh Das Shrestha	Light flyweight	Bye	Kim Ki-suk (KOR); L RSCO	Did not advance		
Ramesh Shrestha	Flyweight	Anurudha Rathnayake (SRI); L RSCO	Did not advance			
Tej Bahadur Thapa Magar	Bantamweight	Bye	Chotipat Wongprates (THA); L 15-1	Did not advance		
Ram Chandra Thapa Magar	Featherweight	Jahongir Abdullaev (KGZ); L 4-17	Did not advance			
Dhan Bahadur Hitang	Lightweight	Bye	Ruslan Mussinov (KAZ); L RSCO	Did not advance		
Kumar Adhikari	Light welterweight	Sayed Haroon Sadat (AFG); W 11-13	—N/a	Nurzhan Karimzhanov (KAZ); L WO	Did not advance	
Arjun Kumar Tamang	Welterweight	Daiviin Otgonbayar (MGL); L RSCH	—N/a	Did not advance		
Sudarna Sapkota	Light middleweight	Sirojiddin Naimov (UZB); L WO	—N/a	Did not advance		

== Golf ==
Nepal participated in golf.

Men

Athlete	Event	Round 1	Round 2	Round 3	Round 4	Total	Par	Rank
Chuda Bahadur Bhandari	Individual	79	84	83	84	330	+42	46
Tashi Ghale	Individual	91	88	88	83	345	+57	53
Raj Pradhan	Individual	88	88	93	83	352	+64	55
Deep Bahadur Basnet	Individual	87	94	86	95	362	+74	59
Deep Bahadur Basnet; Chuda Bahadur Bhandari; Tashi Ghale; Raj Pradhan	Team	254	260	252	250	1016	+152	14

== Judo ==
Nepal participated in judo.

Men

Athlete	Event	Round 1	Round 2	Round 3	Semifinal	Repechage Round 1	Repechage Round 2	Repechage Round 3	Final/BM	Rank
Athlete	Event	Opposition Result	Opposition Result	Opposition Result	Opposition Result	Opposition Result	Opposition Result	Opposition Result	Opposition Result	Rank
Narendra Kumar Dangol	60 kg	Bye	Al-Dhafiri (KUW); L 0001-1110	Did not advance						
Mohan Sunuwar	66 kg	Bye	Butt (PAK); L 0001-1000	Did not advance						
Hari Kumar Lama	73 kg	Bye	Malekmohammadi (IRI); L 0000-1000	Did not advance						

== Karate ==
Nepal participated in karate.

Men's kumite

Athlete	Event	1st preliminary round	Quarterfinal	Semifinal	Repechage	Final/BM	Rank
Athlete	Event	Opposition Result	Opposition Result	Opposition Result	Opposition Result	Opposition Result	Rank
Amrit Adhikari	55 kg	Bye	Kasimov (UZB); L 3-12	—N/a	Udawaththa (SRI); W 2-9	Maulidin (INA); L 0-3	5
Deepak Shrestha	60 kg	Bye	Karimov (UZB); L 1-10	Did not advance			
Sambar Bahadur Gole	65 kg	Mastonzoda (TJK); L 0-2	Did not advance				
Ravi Maharjan	70 kg	Mariano (PHI); W 2-1	Silva (SRI); W 0-8	Katiraei (IRI); L 2-4	—N/a	Adwan (QAT); L 0-9	5
Rajesh Shrestha	75 kg	Srichan (THA); W 3^{DQ}-4	Rafati (QAT); L 1-0	Did not advance			

== Shooting ==
Nepal participated in shooting.

Men

Athlete	Event	Qualification		Final	
Athlete	Event	Points	Rank	Points	Rank
Jagat Tamang	Individual 10 m air pistol	534	47	Did not advance	
Tika Shrestha	Individual 10 m air rifle	570	42	Did not advance	

Women

Athlete	Event	Qualification		Final	
Athlete	Event	Points	Rank	Points	Rank
Maya Sunuwar	Individual 10 m air pistol	350	30	Did not advance	
Bivaswari Rai	Individual 10 m air rifle	373	35	Did not advance	

== Soft Tennis ==
Nepal participated in soft tennis.

Men

Athlete	Event	Round Group			Quarterfinals	Semifinals	Final	Rank
Athlete	Event	Match 1	Match 2	Match 3	Quarterfinals	Semifinals	Final	Rank
Athlete	Event	Opposition Result	Opposition Result	Opposition Result	Opposition Result	Opposition Result	Opposition Result	Rank
Abhishek Aman Jha	Singles	—N/a	Kim (KOR); L 4-0	Liu (TPE); L 4-1	Did not advance			
Nirmal Kaji Sthapit	Singles	Bayartsogt (MGL); L 1-4	Liao (TPE); L 4-0	Shuji (JPN); L 4-0	Did not advance			
Abhishek Aman Jha; Nirmal Kaji Sthapit	Doubles	—N/a	Shigeo (JPN); Takagawa (JPN); L 5-0	Huo (CHN); Zhao (CHN); L 4-0	Did not advance			

== Taekwondo ==
Nepal participated in taekwondo.

Men

Athlete	Event	First Round	Second Round	Quarterfinals	Semifinal	Final	
Athlete	Event	Opposition Score	Opposition Score	Opposition Score	Opposition Score	Opposition Score	Rank
Kumar Manandhar	-54 kg	Nguyễn (VIE); L 7-4	Did not advance				
Kumar Bahadur Karki	-58 kg	Phongpachith (LAO); W 0^{DQ}-0	Bhandari (IND); L 0-3	Did not advance			
Nirmal Shrestha	-62 kg	Bye	Ahmedov (UZB); W 8-3	Al-Matrafi (KSA); L 2-5	Did not advance		
Deepak Bista	-67 kg	Bye	Chumodoev (KGZ); W 4-2	Tashi (BHU); W 13-10	Nam (KOR); L 2-9	Did not advance	3rd place, bronze medalist(s)
Niranjan Shrestha	-72 kg	Stanekzai (AFG); W 1-5	Briones (PHI); L 12-3	Did not advance			

Women

Athlete	Event	First Round	Second Round	Quarterfinals	Semifinal	Final	
Athlete	Event	Opposition Score	Opposition Score	Opposition Score	Opposition Score	Opposition Score	Rank
Rupa Kumari Shangdan	-47 kg	Al-Hashimi (BRN); L 3-2	Did not advance				
Sangina Baidya	-51 kg	Lim (KOR); L 3-0	Did not advance				
Renuka Magar	-55 kg	Bye	Devi (IND); W 2-9	—N/a	Yun (KOR); L 1-6	Did not advance	3rd place, bronze medalist(s)
Bandana Shrestha	-59 kg	Devi (IND); L 3-3	Did not advance				
Ritu Jimee Rai	-63 kg	Dawani (JOR); W 0-0^{DQ}	—N/a		Liu (CHN); L 7-0	Did not advance	3rd place, bronze medalist(s)

== Weightlifting ==
Nepal participated in weightlifting.

Men

Athlete	Event	Snatch		Clean & Jerk		Total	Rank
Athlete	Event	Result	Rank	Result	Rank	Total	Rank
Rakesh Ranjeet	-56 kg	95.0	11	120.0	10	215.0	10
Roshan Nakarmi	-62 kg	110.0	9	137.5	8	247.5	8

== Wushu ==
Nepal participated in wushu.

=== Men ===
Sanda

Athlete	Event	1st preliminary round	Quarterfinals	Semifinals	Final
Athlete	Event	Opposition Result	Opposition Result	Opposition Result	Opposition Result
Birendra B. K.	-52 kg	Woo (KOR); L 0-2	Did not advance		
Narayan Shrestha	-56 kg	Oudomphon (LAO); L 0-0^{RET}	Did not advance		
Shyam Bista	-65 kg	Bye	Chomphuphuang (THA); L 2-0	Did not advance	

Taijiquan\Taijijian

Athlete	Event	Taijiquan		Taijijian		Total	
Athlete	Event	Result	Rank	Result	Rank	Result	Rank
Suraj Kumar Shrestha	Taijiquan	DNS	NM	8.78	12	8.78	13
