= Taekwondo at the 2002 Asian Games – Men's 72 kg =

Taekwondo competition

Men's 72 kg at the 2002 Asian Games
- Venue: Gudeok Gymnasium
- Date: 10 October 2002
- Competitors: 17 from 17 nations

Medalists
gold medal	Hadi Saei	Iran
silver medal	Lee Jae-shin	South Korea
bronze medal	Yesbol Yerden	Kazakhstan
bronze medal	Iyad Al-Saify	Jordan

The men's lightweight (−72 kilograms) event at the 2002 Asian Games took place on 10 October 2002 at Gudeok Gymnasium, Busan, South Korea.

== Schedule ==
All times are Korea Standard Time (UTC+09:00)

Date	Time	Event
Thursday, 10 October 2002	14:00	Round 1
Thursday, 10 October 2002	14:00	Round 2
Thursday, 10 October 2002	14:00	Round 3
Thursday, 10 October 2002	14:00	Semifinals
Thursday, 10 October 2002	19:50	Final

== Results ==
Legend

- DQ — Won by disqualification
- K — Won by knockout
- R — Won by referee stop contest
- W — Won by withdrawal

=== Final ===
Final
Hadi Saei (IRI)	4
Lee Jae-shin (KOR)	3

=== Top half ===
Round 1
Hamed Stanekzai (AFG)	1
Niranjan Shrestha (NEP)	5

Round 2
Alexander Briones (PHI)	12
Niranjan Shrestha (NEP)	3
Yesbol Yerden (KAZ)	15^{R}
Viktor Kim (KGZ)	0
Ali Al-Najar (KSA)
In Phanna (CAM)	DQ
Thamer Al-Daihani (KUW)
Hadi Saei (IRI)	DQ

Round 3
Alexander Briones (PHI)	4
Yesbol Yerden (KAZ)	6
In Phanna (CAM)	0
Hadi Saei (IRI)	13

Semifinals
Yesbol Yerden (KAZ)	3
Hadi Saei (IRI)	11

=== Bottom half ===
Round 1

Round 2
Iyad Al-Saify (JOR)	DQ
Timur Nurullaev (UZB)
Ali Mohamed Al-Banna (BRN)	DQ
Ammar Al-Arami (YEM)
Bashar Abdeljawad (PLE)
Praban Saikia (IND)	W
Sonam Penjor (BHU)	0
Lee Jae-shin (KOR)	10

Round 3
Iyad Al-Saify (JOR)	19^{K}
Ali Mohamed Al-Banna (BRN)	1
Praban Saikia (IND)	2
Lee Jae-shin (KOR)	5

Semifinals
Iyad Al-Saify (JOR)	1
Lee Jae-shin (KOR)	5
