= Taekwondo at the 2002 Asian Games – Men's 67 kg =

Taekwondo competition

Men's 67 kg at the 2002 Asian Games
- Venue: Gudeok Gymnasium
- Date: 13 October 2002
- Competitors: 20 from 20 nations

Medalists
gold medal	Nam Yeon-sik	South Korea
silver medal	Sung Yu-chi	Chinese Taipei
bronze medal	Pavel Yugay	Uzbekistan
bronze medal	Deepak Bista	Nepal

The men's featherweight (−67 kilograms) event at the 2002 Asian Games took place on 13 October 2002 at Gudeok Gymnasium, Busan, South Korea.

== Schedule ==
All times are Korea Standard Time (UTC+09:00)

Date	Time	Event
Sunday, 13 October 2002	14:00	Round 1
Sunday, 13 October 2002	14:00	Round 2
Sunday, 13 October 2002	14:00	Round 3
Sunday, 13 October 2002	14:00	Semifinals
Sunday, 13 October 2002	19:00	Final

== Results ==
Legend

- DQ — Won by disqualification
- R — Won by referee stop contest

=== Final ===
Final
Sung Yu-chi (TPE)	4
Nam Yeon-sik (KOR)	4

=== Top half ===
Round 1
Pavel Yugay (UZB)	6
Batbilegiin Onon (MGL)	5
Loi Chak Yee (MAC)	0
Chanatha Thanaroekchai (THA)	8

Round 2
Gil Fernandes (TMP)	0
Pavel Yugay (UZB)	13^{R}
Abdulqader Hikmat (QAT)	DQ
Ibrahim El-Hassan (PLE)
Jamil Al-Khuffash (JOR)	4
Ýazmyrat Kurbanow (TKM)	0
Chanatha Thanaroekchai (THA)	1
Sung Yu-chi (TPE)	5

Round 3
Pavel Yugay (UZB)	DQ
Abdulqader Hikmat (QAT)
Jamil Al-Khuffash (JOR)	4
Sung Yu-chi (TPE)	6

Semifinals
Pavel Yugay (UZB)	0
Sung Yu-chi (TPE)	6

=== Bottom half ===
Round 1
Nagd Al-Mutawakel (YEM)	7
Ulanbek Chumodoev (KGZ)	9
Abdulmanam Al-Khawahr (KSA)	9
Islomiddin Fazylov (TJK)	8

Round 2
Deepak Bista (NEP)	4
Ulanbek Chumodoev (KGZ)	2
Mao Sophal (CAM)	3
Tashi Tashi (BHU)	4
Thit Lwin (MYA)	7
Sanjeev Kumar (IND)	3
Abdulmanam Al-Khawahr (KSA)	0
Nam Yeon-sik (KOR)	2

Round 3
Deepak Bista (NEP)	13
Tashi Tashi (BHU)	10
Thit Lwin (MYA)	0
Nam Yeon-sik (KOR)	11

Semifinals
Deepak Bista (NEP)	2
Nam Yeon-sik (KOR)	9
