= Taekwondo at the 2002 Asian Games – Women's 47 kg =

Taekwondo competition

Women's 47 kg at the 2002 Asian Games
- Venue: Gudeok Gymnasium
- Date: 10 October 2002
- Competitors: 13 from 13 nations

Medalists
gold medal	Chen Shih-hsin	Chinese Taipei
silver medal	Nguyễn Thị Huyền Diệu	Vietnam
bronze medal	Wang Ying	China
bronze medal	Kang Ji-hyun	South Korea

The women's finweight (−47 kilograms) event at the 2002 Asian Games took place on Thursday 10 October 2002 at Gudeok Gymnasium, Busan, South Korea.

A total of 13 women from 13 countries competed in this event, limited to fighters whose body weight was less than 47 kilograms. Chen Shih-hsin of Chinese Taipei won the gold medal after beating Nguyễn Thị Huyền Diệu of Vietnam in gold medal match 4–1.

== Schedule ==
All times are Korea Standard Time (UTC+09:00)

Date	Time	Event
Thursday, 10 October 2002	14:00	Round 1
Thursday, 10 October 2002	14:00	Round 2
Thursday, 10 October 2002	14:00	Semifinals
Thursday, 10 October 2002	19:00	Final

== Results ==
Legend

- DQ — Won by disqualification
- R — Won by referee stop contest

Round 1
Wornwimon Phuangphee (THA)	4
Khin Swe Oo (MYA)	0
Kinley Bidha (BHU)	0
Eva Marie Ditan (PHI)	2
Ika Dian Fitria (INA)	0
Wang Ying (CHN)	9
Kang Ji-hyun (KOR)	DQ
Nyamdavaagiin Yagaantsetseg (MGL)
Wala Al-Hashimi (BRN)	3
Rupa Kumari Shangdan (NEP)	2

Round 2
Nguyễn Thị Huyền Diệu (VIE)	5
Wornwimon Phuangphee (THA)	1
Eva Marie Ditan (PHI)	0
Wang Ying (CHN)	3
Seema Deswal (IND)	0
Kang Ji-hyun (KOR)	3
Wala Al-Hashimi (BRN)	0
Chen Shih-hsin (TPE)	9^{R}

Semifinals
Nguyễn Thị Huyền Diệu (VIE)	5
Wang Ying (CHN)	2
Kang Ji-hyun (KOR)	2
Chen Shih-hsin (TPE)	4

Final
Nguyễn Thị Huyền Diệu (VIE)	1
Chen Shih-hsin (TPE)	4
