= Taekwondo at the 2002 Asian Games – Men's 84 kg =

Taekwondo competition

Men's 84 kg at the 2002 Asian Games
- Venue: Gudeok Gymnasium
- Date: 12 October 2002
- Competitors: 11 from 11 nations

Medalists
gold medal	Kim Kyong-hun	South Korea
silver medal	Phan Tấn Đạt	Vietnam
bronze medal	Dindo Simpao	Philippines
bronze medal	Arman Chilmanov	Kazakhstan

The men's middleweight (−84 kilograms) event at the 2002 Asian Games took place on 12 October 2002 at Gudeok Gymnasium, Busan, South Korea.

Like all Asian Games taekwondo events, the competition was a straight single-elimination tournament.

A total of 11 men from 11 countries competed in this event, limited to fighters whose body weight was less than 84 kilograms. Kim Kyong-hun of South Korea won the gold medal.

== Schedule ==
All times are Korea Standard Time (UTC+09:00)

Date	Time	Event
Saturday, 12 October 2002	14:00	Round 1
Saturday, 12 October 2002	14:00	Round 2
Saturday, 12 October 2002	14:00	Semifinals
Saturday, 12 October 2002	19:50	Final

== Results ==
Legend

- DQ — Won by disqualification
- W — Won by withdrawal

Round 1
Muhammad Akhtar (PAK)	3
Dindo Simpao (PHI)	8
Arman Chilmanov (KAZ)	DQ
Ammar Al-Rashedi (KUW)
Phan Tấn Đạt (VIE)	6
Zhang Yumin (CHN)	1

Round 2
Parwiz Nazari (AFG)	2
Dindo Simpao (PHI)	4
Kim Kyong-hun (KOR)	7
Yousef Karami (IRI)	6
Ali Al-Mutawa (BRN)	1
Arman Chilmanov (KAZ)	10
Phan Tấn Đạt (VIE)	2
Meng Sokry (CAM)	0

Semifinals
Dindo Simpao (PHI)
Kim Kyong-hun (KOR)	W
Arman Chilmanov (KAZ)	2
Phan Tấn Đạt (VIE)	9

Final
Kim Kyong-hun (KOR)	1^{W}
Phan Tấn Đạt (VIE)	0
