= Taekwondo at the 2002 Asian Games – Women's 55 kg =

Taekwondo competition

Women's 55 kg at the 2002 Asian Games
- Venue: Gudeok Gymnasium
- Date: 12 October 2002
- Competitors: 10 from 10 nations

Medalists
gold medal	Yun Kyung-rim	South Korea
silver medal	Chonnapas Premwaew	Thailand
bronze medal	Parvaneh Tehrani	Iran
bronze medal	Renuka Magar	Nepal

The women's bantamweight (−55 kilograms) event at the 2002 Asian Games took place on Saturday 12 October 2002 at Gudeok Gymnasium, Busan, South Korea.

Like all Asian Games taekwondo events, the competition was a straight single-elimination tournament.

A total of ten competitors from ten different countries (NOCs) competed in this event, limited to fighters whose body weight was less than 55 kilograms.

Yun Kyung-rim of South Korea won the gold medal after beating Chonnapas Premwaew of Thailand in gold medal match 2–0.

== Schedule ==
All times are Korea Standard Time (UTC+09:00)

Date	Time	Event
Saturday, 12 October 2002	14:00	Round 1
Saturday, 12 October 2002	14:00	Round 2
Saturday, 12 October 2002	14:00	Semifinals
Saturday, 12 October 2002	19:00	Final

== Results ==
Legend

- R — Won by referee stop contest

Round 1
Phạm Thị Phương Quyên (VIE)	1
Parvaneh Tehrani (IRI)	1
Elaine Teo (MAS)	14^{R}
Hakima Khashai (AFG)	0

Round 2
Tenzin Norden (BHU)	0
Parvaneh Tehrani (IRI)	4
Cosette Basbous (LIB)	0
Chonnapas Premwaew (THA)	2
Sagolsem Nanao Devi (IND)	2
Renuka Magar (NEP)	9
Elaine Teo (MAS)	1
Yun Kyung-rim (KOR)	4

Semifinals
Parvaneh Tehrani (IRI)	2
Chonnapas Premwaew (THA)	7
Renuka Magar (NEP)	1
Yun Kyung-rim (KOR)	6

Final
Chonnapas Premwaew (THA)	0
Yun Kyung-rim (KOR)	2
