= Boxing at the 2002 Asian Games – Men's 60 kg =

Boxing competitions

Men's 60 kg at the 2002 Asian Games
- Venue: Masan Gymnasium
- Date: 2–13 October 2002
- Competitors: 17 from 17 nations

Medalists
gold medal	Dilshod Mahmudov	Uzbekistan
silver medal	Baik Jong-sub	South Korea
bronze medal	Ruslan Mussinov	Kazakhstan
bronze medal	Adnan Yusoh	Malaysia

The men's lightweight (60 kilograms) event at the 2002 Asian Games took place from 2 to 13 October 2002 at Masan Gymnasium, Masan, South Korea.

== Schedule ==
All times are Korea Standard Time (UTC+09:00)

Date	Time	Event
Wednesday, 2 October 2002	14:00	Preliminary 1
Monday, 7 October 2002	14:00	Preliminary 2
Wednesday, 9 October 2002	14:00	Quarterfinals
Saturday, 12 October 2002	14:00	Semifinals
Sunday, 13 October 2002	14:00	Final

== Results ==
Legend

- RSCH — Won by referee stop contest head blow
- RSCO — Won by referee stop contest outclassed

=== Final ===
Final
Baik Jong-sub (KOR)	17
Dilshod Mahmudov (UZB)	27

=== Top half ===
Preliminary 1

Preliminary 2
Tamim Ahmed Akhtari (AFG)
Ramanand (IND)	RSCO
Dhan Bahadur Hitang (NEP)
Ruslan Mussinov (KAZ)	RSCO
Victor Ramos (TMP)
Baik Jong-sub (KOR)	RSCO
Sam Sokunthea (CAM)
Pichai Sayotha (THA)	RSCO

Quarterfinals
Ramanand (IND)	24
Ruslan Mussinov (KAZ)	37
Baik Jong-sub (KOR)	RSCO
Pichai Sayotha (THA)

Semifinals
Ruslan Mussinov (KAZ)	29
Baik Jong-sub (KOR)	+29

=== Bottom half ===
Preliminary 1
Yousef Hamidi (SYR)	+15
Tserennadmidyn Mönkhchuluun (MGL)	15

Preliminary 2
Nilonedone Tanovanh (LAO)	14
Adnan Yusoh (MAS)	25
Mazhar Hussain (PAK)
Abyl Tileberdi Uulu (KGZ)	RSCH
Chan Wai Seng (MAC)
Dilshod Mahmudov (UZB)	RSCO
Anthony Igusquiza (PHI)	20
Yousef Hamidi (SYR)	14

Quarterfinals
Adnan Yusoh (MAS)	40
Abyl Tileberdi Uulu (KGZ)	36
Dilshod Mahmudov (UZB)	RSCO
Anthony Igusquiza (PHI)

Semifinals
Adnan Yusoh (MAS)	18
Dilshod Mahmudov (UZB)	34
