= Shooting at the 2002 Asian Games – Women's 10 metre air pistol =

Women's 10 metre air pistol at the 2002 Asian Games
- Venue: Changwon International Shooting Range
- Dates: 3 October 2002
- Competitors: 34 from 15 nations

Medalists
| gold medal | Tao Luna | China |
| silver medal | Ren Jie | China |
| bronze medal | Park Jung-hee | South Korea |

The women's 10 metre air pistol competition at the 2002 Asian Games in Busan, South Korea was held on 3 October at the Changwon International Shooting Range.

== Schedule ==
All times are Korea Standard Time (UTC+09:00)

| Date | Time | Event |
|---|---|---|
| Thursday, 3 October 2002 | 09:00 | Qualification |
| Thursday, 3 October 2002 | 13:00 | Final |

== Records ==
Prior to this competition, the existing world, Asian and Games records were as follows.

Qualification
| World Record | Svetlana Smirnova (RUS) | 393 | Munich, Germany | 23 May 1998 |
| Asian Record | Cai Yieqing (CHN) | 390 | Atlanta, United States | 26 August 1998 |
| Games Record | Dina Aspandiyarova (KAZ) | 389 | Bangkok, Thailand | 8 December 1998 |
Final
| World Record | Ren Jie (CHN) | 493.5 | Munich, Germany | 22 May 1999 |
| Asian Record | Ren Jie (CHN) | 493.5 | Munich, Germany | 22 May 1999 |
| Games Record | Dina Aspandiyarova (KAZ) | 486.8 | Bangkok, Thailand | 8 December 1998 |

== Results ==
Legend

- DNS — Did not start

=== Qualification ===
| Rank | Athlete | Series | | | | Total | Notes |
| Rank | Athlete | 1 | 2 | 3 | 4 | Total | Notes |
|---|---|---|---|---|---|---|---|
| 1 | Tao Luna (CHN) | 98 | 99 | 99 | 94 | 390 | GR |
| 2 | Ren Jie (CHN) | 96 | 99 | 93 | 98 | 386 | |
| 3 | Michiko Fukushima (JPN) | 97 | 94 | 94 | 95 | 380 | |
| 4 | Chen Ying (CHN) | 96 | 93 | 98 | 93 | 380 | |
| 5 | Otryadyn Gündegmaa (MGL) | 95 | 93 | 94 | 96 | 378 | |
| 6 | Yuliya Bondareva (KAZ) | 96 | 92 | 94 | 96 | 378 | |
| 7 | Zauresh Baibussinova (KAZ) | 95 | 95 | 93 | 95 | 378 | |
| 8 | Park Jung-hee (KOR) | 95 | 96 | 94 | 93 | 378 | |
| 9 | Shweta Chaudhary (IND) | 96 | 94 | 94 | 92 | 376 | |
| 10 | Gang Eun-ra (KOR) | 95 | 92 | 94 | 94 | 375 | |
| 10 | Ko Jin-sook (KOR) | 96 | 95 | 94 | 90 | 375 | |
| 12 | Zabida Yrsalieva (KGZ) | 92 | 90 | 96 | 96 | 374 | |
| 12 | Galina Belyayeva (KAZ) | 96 | 93 | 91 | 94 | 374 | |
| 14 | Tsogbadrakhyn Mönkhzul (MGL) | 93 | 96 | 93 | 91 | 373 | |
| 15 | Shilpi Singh (IND) | 93 | 96 | 90 | 92 | 371 | |
| 16 | Suraye Dzhumaeva (TJK) | 88 | 93 | 94 | 95 | 370 | |
| 16 | Sumaya Mubarak (UAE) | 91 | 98 | 93 | 88 | 370 | |
| 18 | Yukari Konishi (JPN) | 90 | 94 | 89 | 96 | 369 | |
| 19 | Chan Lai Ping (HKG) | 93 | 92 | 93 | 90 | 368 | |
| 19 | Therese Cantada (PHI) | 92 | 94 | 97 | 85 | 368 | |
| 21 | Yuki Yoshida (JPN) | 92 | 91 | 92 | 92 | 367 | |
| 22 | Shamma Al-Muhairi (UAE) | 94 | 93 | 91 | 88 | 366 | |
| 23 | Yan Suk Yin (HKG) | 91 | 92 | 92 | 90 | 365 | |
| 24 | Lam Hoi Ing (MAC) | 91 | 92 | 89 | 91 | 363 | |
| 25 | Fatima Al-Booki (UAE) | 88 | 90 | 95 | 89 | 362 | |
| 25 | Chan Pou Pou (MAC) | 93 | 88 | 93 | 88 | 362 | |
| 27 | Sheila Kanungo (IND) | 95 | 89 | 87 | 90 | 361 | |
| 28 | Tsui Leung Ying (HKG) | 91 | 95 | 90 | 84 | 360 | |
| 29 | Davaajantsangiin Oyuun (MGL) | 90 | 89 | 93 | 86 | 358 | |
| 30 | Maya Sunuwar (NEP) | 92 | 88 | 86 | 84 | 350 | |
| 31 | Bahiya Jabir (QAT) | 86 | 88 | 78 | 92 | 344 | |
| 32 | Banu Hijazi (QAT) | 89 | 84 | 87 | 83 | 343 | |
| 33 | Hissa Al-Asiri (QAT) | 79 | 90 | 74 | 35 | 278 | |
| — | Malalai Afzali (AFG) | | | | | DNS | |

=== Final ===
| Rank | Athlete | Qual. | Final | | | | | | | | | | | Total | S-off | Notes |
| Rank | Athlete | Qual. | 1 | 2 | 3 | 4 | 5 | 6 | 7 | 8 | 9 | 10 | Total | Total | S-off | Notes |
|---|---|---|---|---|---|---|---|---|---|---|---|---|---|---|---|---|
| 1st place, gold medalist(s) | Tao Luna (CHN) | 390 | 8.9 | 10.7 | 9.4 | 9.5 | 9.7 | 10.6 | 9.1 | 9.6 | 10.0 | 9.7 | 97.2 | 487.2 | | GR |
| 2nd place, silver medalist(s) | Ren Jie (CHN) | 386 | 10.6 | 10.2 | 8.3 | 9.7 | 9.4 | 10.5 | 10.4 | 9.9 | 9.8 | 9.7 | 98.5 | 484.5 | | |
| 3rd place, bronze medalist(s) | Park Jung-hee (KOR) | 378 | 9.6 | 9.3 | 10.4 | 10.4 | 10.2 | 9.0 | 9.1 | 9.7 | 10.1 | 10.7 | 98.5 | 476.5 | | |
| 4 | Chen Ying (CHN) | 380 | 9.4 | 10.2 | 10.2 | 9.8 | 9.0 | 8.9 | 9.4 | 8.8 | 10.7 | 9.0 | 95.4 | 475.4 | | |
| 5 | Otryadyn Gündegmaa (MGL) | 378 | 10.0 | 9.6 | 10.2 | 9.5 | 9.9 | 9.6 | 9.0 | 9.1 | 9.8 | 9.9 | 96.6 | 474.6 | | |
| 6 | Michiko Fukushima (JPN) | 380 | 10.6 | 6.9 | 9.1 | 9.6 | 10.2 | 9.0 | 9.5 | 10.1 | 10.1 | 9.2 | 94.3 | 474.3 | | |
| 7 | Yuliya Bondareva (KAZ) | 378 | 10.6 | 9.4 | 8.7 | 7.5 | 9.9 | 10.1 | 10.0 | 9.6 | 9.9 | 9.2 | 94.9 | 472.9 | | |
| 8 | Zauresh Baibussinova (KAZ) | 378 | 9.3 | 10.2 | 9.6 | 7.5 | 10.6 | 8.4 | 8.7 | 8.9 | 9.0 | 10.6 | 92.8 | 470.8 | | |
