= Taekwondo at the 2002 Asian Games – Men's 54 kg =

Taekwondo competition

Men's 54 kg at the 2002 Asian Games
- Venue: Gudeok Gymnasium
- Date: 10 October 2002
- Competitors: 25 from 25 nations

Medalists
| gold medal | Park Hee-chul | South Korea |
| silver medal | Chu Mu-yen | Chinese Taipei |
| bronze medal | Muhammad Dalam Imam | Indonesia |
| bronze medal | Akram Al-Noor | Yemen |

The men's finweight (−54 kilograms) event at the 2002 Asian Games took place on 10 October 2002 at Gudeok Gymnasium, Busan, South Korea.

== Schedule ==
All times are Korea Standard Time (UTC+09:00)

| Date | Time | Event |
|---|---|---|
| Thursday, 10 October 2002 | 14:00 | Round 1 |
| Thursday, 10 October 2002 | 14:00 | Round 2 |
| Thursday, 10 October 2002 | 14:00 | Round 3 |
| Thursday, 10 October 2002 | 14:00 | Semifinals |
| Thursday, 10 October 2002 | 19:00 | Final |

== Results ==
Legend

- DQ — Won by disqualification
- R — Won by referee stop contest

=== Final ===
| Final |
| Park Hee-chul (KOR) | 7^{R} |
| Chu Mu-yen (TPE) | 7 |

=== Top half ===
Round 1
Nguyễn Duy Khương (VIE) | 7
Kumar Manandhar (NEP) | 4
Matin Boboev (TJK) | 9
Roberto Cruz (PHI) | 9
Ali Abdulla (QAT) | 0
Muhammad Dalam Imam (INA) | 5
Shahidinshah Mohd Farook (MAS) | 2
Phichet Phibunkhanarak (THA) | 6
Chen Rong (CHN) | DQ
Naser Al-Hurais (KUW)

Round 2
Phouthavong Outhasak (LAO) | 3
Nguyễn Duy Khương (VIE) | 5
Matin Boboev (TJK) | 1
Muhammad Dalam Imam (INA) | 5
Park Hee-chul (KOR) | 6
Phichet Phibunkhanarak (THA) | 0
Chen Rong (CHN) | 1
Aman Abykenov (KGZ) | 3

Round 3
Nguyễn Duy Khương (VIE) | 7
Muhammad Dalam Imam (INA) | 7
Park Hee-chul (KOR) | 5
Aman Abykenov (KGZ) | 0

Semifinals
Muhammad Dalam Imam (INA) | 3
Park Hee-chul (KOR) | 5

=== Bottom half ===
Round 1
Chu Mu-yen (TPE) | 10
Sayed Fadhel Saleh (BRN) | 1
Habib Zarife (LIB) | DQ
Otgonbaataryn Khosbayar (MGL)
Evgeniy Ogay (UZB) | 12
Chao Iat Keong (MAC) | 4
Akram Al-Noor (YEM) | 10
Orazgeldi Orazgeldiýew (TKM) | 7

Round 2
Karma Tenzin (BHU) | 0
Chu Mu-yen (TPE) | 6
Habib Zarife (LIB) | 2
Mohammed Irfan (IND) | 3
Ek Sithoeun (CAM) | 3
Evgeniy Ogay (UZB) | 5
Akram Al-Noor (YEM) | DQ
Mamdoh Al-Mowalad (KSA)

Round 3
Chu Mu-yen (TPE) | 10
Mohammed Irfan (IND) | 1
Evgeniy Ogay (UZB) | 2
Akram Al-Noor (YEM) | 3

Semifinals
Chu Mu-yen (TPE) | 5
Akram Al-Noor (YEM) | 0
