= Boxing at the 2002 Asian Games – Men's 48 kg =

Boxing competitions

Men's 48 kg at the 2002 Asian Games
- Venue: Masan Gymnasium
- Date: 2–13 October 2002
- Competitors: 17 from 17 nations

Medalists
gold medal	Kim Ki-suk	South Korea
silver medal	Harry Tañamor	Philippines
bronze medal	Mekhrodj Umarov	Tajikistan
bronze medal	Suban Pannon	Thailand

The men's light flyweight (48 kilograms) event at the 2002 Asian Games took place from 2 to 13 October 2002 at Masan Gymnasium, Masan, South Korea.

== Schedule ==
All times are Korea Standard Time (UTC+09:00)

Date	Time	Event
Wednesday, 2 October 2002	14:00	Preliminary 1
Friday, 4 October 2002	14:00	Preliminary 2
Tuesday, 8 October 2002	14:00	Quarterfinals
Saturday, 12 October 2002	14:00	Semifinals
Sunday, 13 October 2002	14:00	Final

== Results ==
Legend

- KO — Won by knockout
- RSC — Won by referee stop contest
- RSCO — Won by referee stop contest outclassed

=== Final ===
Final
Kim Ki-suk (KOR)	24
Harry Tañamor (PHI)	19

=== Top half ===
Preliminary 1

Preliminary 2
Kim Ki-suk (KOR)	RSCO
Ramesh Das Shrestha (NEP)
Mohd Zamzai Azizi (MAS)	15
Xayyaphone Chanthasone (LAO)	11
Choijiljavyn Bumchin (MGL)	34
Harsha Kumara (SRI)	20
Mekhrodj Umarov (TJK)	RSCO
Bonyx Yusak Saweho (INA)

Quarterfinals
Kim Ki-suk (KOR)	RSCO
Mohd Zamzai Azizi (MAS)
Choijiljavyn Bumchin (MGL)	27
Mekhrodj Umarov (TJK)	36

Semifinals
Kim Ki-suk (KOR)	RSCO
Mekhrodj Umarov (TJK)

=== Bottom half ===
Preliminary 1
Kyaw Swar Aung (MYA)	7
Harry Tañamor (PHI)	25

Preliminary 2
Mak Sophat (CAM)
Suban Pannon (THA)	KO
Dawood Mahmoude (AFG)
Kim Un-chol (PRK)	RSCO
Mohammed Ali Qamar (IND)	RSC
Imran Hafeez (PAK)
Zou Shiming (CHN)	13
Harry Tañamor (PHI)	15

Quarterfinals
Suban Pannon (THA)	30
Kim Un-chol (PRK)	24
Mohammed Ali Qamar (IND)	11
Harry Tañamor (PHI)	21

Semifinals
Suban Pannon (THA)	26
Harry Tañamor (PHI)	35
