= Taekwondo at the 2002 Asian Games – Women's 59 kg =

Taekwondo competition

Women's 59 kg at the 2002 Asian Games
- Venue: Gudeok Gymnasium
- Date: 13 October 2002
- Competitors: 10 from 10 nations

Medalists
gold medal	Yun Sung-hee	South Korea
silver medal	Tseng Pei-hua	Chinese Taipei
bronze medal	Lê Thị Nhung	Vietnam
bronze medal	Wang Shuo	China

The women's featherweight (−59 kilograms) event at the 2002 Asian Games took place on Sunday 13 October 2002 at Gudeok Gymnasium, Busan, South Korea.

A total of ten competitors from ten different countries (NOCs) competed in this event, limited to fighters whose body weight was less than 59 kilograms.

Yun Sung-hee of South Korea won the gold medal after beating Tseng Pei-hua of Chinese Taipei in gold medal match 4–1, The bronze medal was shared by Chinese Wang Shuo and Vietnamese Lê Thị Nhung. Athletes from Iran, Bhutan, India and Kazakhstan lost in quarterfinal and they all finished fifth.

The silver medalist Tseng Pei-hua later changed her name to Tseng Li-cheng.

== Schedule ==
All times are Korea Standard Time (UTC+09:00)

Date	Time	Event
Sunday, 13 October 2002	14:00	Round 1
Sunday, 13 October 2002	14:00	Round 2
Sunday, 13 October 2002	14:00	Semifinals
Sunday, 13 October 2002	19:00	Final

== Results ==
Round 1
Kalindi Tamayo (PHI)	2
Lê Thị Nhung (VIE)	2
Bandana Shrestha (NEP)	3
P. Ranibara Devi (IND)	3

Round 2
Marzieh Asadi (IRI)	2
Lê Thị Nhung (VIE)	4
Tshering Chhoden (BHU)	0
Tseng Pei-hua (TPE)	10
Xeniya Stamova (KAZ)	0
Yun Sung-hee (KOR)	4
P. Ranibara Devi (IND)	1
Wang Shuo (CHN)	4

Semifinals
Lê Thị Nhung (VIE)	1
Tseng Pei-hua (TPE)	7
Yun Sung-hee (KOR)	7
Wang Shuo (CHN)	2

Final
Tseng Pei-hua (TPE)	1
Yun Sung-hee (KOR)	4
