= Soft tennis at the 2002 Asian Games – Men's doubles =

Men's doubles at the 2002 Asian Games
- Venue: Sajik Tennis Courts
- Dates: 4–7 October 2002
- Competitors: 24 from 7 nations

Medalists
gold medal	Lee Won-hak; You Young-dong	South Korea
silver medal	Hwang Jeong-hwan; Kim Hee-soo	South Korea
bronze medal	Liao Nan-kai; Tsai Ho-tsen	Chinese Taipei

The men's doubles soft tennis event was part of the soft tennis programme and took place between October 4 and 7, at the Sajik Tennis Courts.

== Schedule ==
All times are Korea Standard Time (UTC+09:00)

Date	Time	Event
Friday, 4 October 2002	09:00	Preliminary round
Friday, 4 October 2002	14:10	Quarterfinals
Friday, 4 October 2002	15:20	Semifinals
Friday, 4 October 2002	16:30	3rd–6th finals
Monday, 7 October 2002	14:20	Final

== Results ==
=== Preliminary round ===
==== Group A ====
Pos	Team	Pld	W	L	GF	GA	GD	Qualification
1	Hwang Jeong-hwan (KOR) Kim Hee-soo (KOR)	2	2	0	10	3	+7	Quarterfinals
2	Kuo Hsu-tung (TPE) Fang Tung-hsien (TPE)	2	1	1	8	5	+3	Quarterfinals
3	Richmond Paguyo (PHI) Wenifredo de Leon (PHI)	2	0	2	0	10	−10	

Source: Report

	Score		Game								
	Score		1	2	3	4	5	6	7	8	9
Hwang Jeong-hwan (KOR); Kim Hee-soo (KOR)	5–3	Kuo Hsu-tung (TPE); Fang Tung-hsien (TPE)	3–5	2–4	6–4	4–6	4–1	4–0	4–1	4–1	
Hwang Jeong-hwan (KOR); Kim Hee-soo (KOR)	5–0	Richmond Paguyo (PHI); Wenifredo de Leon (PHI)	4–1	4–2	4–0	4–2	4–2				
Kuo Hsu-tung (TPE); Fang Tung-hsien (TPE)	5–0	Richmond Paguyo (PHI); Wenifredo de Leon (PHI)	4–1	4–1	6–4	4–2	4–1				

==== Group B ====
Pos	Team	Pld	W	L	GF	GA	GD	Qualification
1	Lee Won-hak (KOR) You Young-dong (KOR)	2	2	0	10	3	+7	Quarterfinals
2	Liao Nan-kai (TPE) Tsai Ho-tsen (TPE)	2	1	1	8	5	+3	Quarterfinals
3	Bayarbilegiin Batzorig (MGL) Radnaabazaryn Bayartogtokh (MGL)	2	0	2	0	10	−10	

Source: Report

	Score		Game								
	Score		1	2	3	4	5	6	7	8	9
Liao Nan-kai (TPE); Tsai Ho-tsen (TPE)	3–5	Lee Won-hak (KOR); You Young-dong (KOR)	0–4	0–4	4–0	4–2	2–4	5–7	5–3	0–4	
Liao Nan-kai (TPE); Tsai Ho-tsen (TPE)	5–0	Bayarbilegiin Batzorig (MGL); Radnaabazaryn Bayartogtokh (MGL)	4–1	4–0	4–1	8–6	4–0				
Lee Won-hak (KOR); You Young-dong (KOR)	5–0	Bayarbilegiin Batzorig (MGL); Radnaabazaryn Bayartogtokh (MGL)	4–0	4–0	4–2	4–1	4–0				

==== Group C ====
Pos	Team	Pld	W	L	GF	GA	GD	Qualification
1	Shigeo Nakahori (JPN) Tsuneo Takagawa (JPN)	2	2	0	10	0	+10	Quarterfinals
2	Huo Rui (CHN) Zhao Yang (CHN)	2	1	1	5	6	−1	Quarterfinals
3	Nirmal Kaji Sthapit (NEP) Abhishek Aman Jha (NEP)	2	0	2	1	10	−9	

Source: Report

	Score		Game								
	Score		1	2	3	4	5	6	7	8	9
Shigeo Nakahori (JPN); Tsuneo Takagawa (JPN)	5–0	Huo Rui (CHN); Zhao Yang (CHN)	4–0	4–2	5–3	4–2	4–2				
Shigeo Nakahori (JPN); Tsuneo Takagawa (JPN)	5–0	Nirmal Kaji Sthapit (NEP); Abhishek Aman Jha (NEP)	4–1	4–1	4–0	4–1	5–3				
Huo Rui (CHN); Zhao Yang (CHN)	5–1	Nirmal Kaji Sthapit (NEP); Abhishek Aman Jha (NEP)	5–3	4–2	6–4	2–4	5–3	4–2			

==== Group D ====
Pos	Team	Pld	W	L	GF	GA	GD	Qualification
1	Zhang Zhuo (CHN) Ren Changsheng (CHN)	2	2	0	10	2	+8	Quarterfinals
2	Yasuhito Mitsuishi (JPN) Hikotsugu Watanabe (JPN)	2	1	1	7	5	+2	Quarterfinals
3	Yondongiin Khuyagbaatar (MGL) Dügeriin Bat-Erdene (MGL)	2	0	2	0	10	−10	

Source: Report

	Score		Game								
	Score		1	2	3	4	5	6	7	8	9
Zhang Zhuo (CHN); Ren Changsheng (CHN)	5–2	Yasuhito Mitsuishi (JPN); Hikotsugu Watanabe (JPN)	5–3	1–4	0–4	4–1	4–2	8–6	4–2		
Zhang Zhuo (CHN); Ren Changsheng (CHN)	5–0	Yondongiin Khuyagbaatar (MGL); Dügeriin Bat-Erdene (MGL)	4–2	4–1	4–1	4–2	4–1				
Yasuhito Mitsuishi (JPN); Hikotsugu Watanabe (JPN)	5–0	Yondongiin Khuyagbaatar (MGL); Dügeriin Bat-Erdene (MGL)	4–2	5–3	4–2	4–2	8–6				

=== Final round ===
Quarterfinals
A1	Hwang Jeong-hwan (KOR); Kim Hee-soo (KOR)	5	4	4	4	1	5
C2	Huo Rui (CHN); Zhao Yang (CHN)	3	0	1	2	4	3
B2	Liao Nan-kai (TPE); Tsai Ho-tsen (TPE)	4	4	4	5	4
D1	Zhang Zhuo (CHN); Ren Changsheng (CHN)	0	1	2	3	0
C1	Shigeo Nakahori (JPN); Tsuneo Takagawa (JPN)	4	4	3	2	2	3	1
A2	Kuo Hsu-tung (TPE); Fang Tung-hsien (TPE)	0	0	5	4	4	5	4
D2	Yasuhito Mitsuishi (JPN); Hikotsugu Watanabe (JPN)	2	2	0	1	3
B1	Lee Won-hak (KOR); You Young-dong (KOR)	4	4	4	4	5

Semifinals
A1	Hwang Jeong-hwan (KOR); Kim Hee-soo (KOR)	4	4	4	3	5	6	2	4
B2	Liao Nan-kai (TPE); Tsai Ho-tsen (TPE)	1	2	6	5	3	4	4	2
A2	Kuo Hsu-tung (TPE); Fang Tung-hsien (TPE)	0	2	4	5	1	0
B1	Lee Won-hak (KOR); You Young-dong (KOR)	4	4	6	3	4	4

Final
A1	Hwang Jeong-hwan (KOR); Kim Hee-soo (KOR)	4	4	3	2	1	5	4	5	5
B1	Lee Won-hak (KOR); You Young-dong (KOR)	1	2	5	4	4	3	6	3	7
3rd–4th place
B2	Liao Nan-kai (TPE); Tsai Ho-tsen (TPE)	6	4	3	4	2	4	6	6
A2	Kuo Hsu-tung (TPE); Fang Tung-hsien (TPE)	8	1	5	1	4	2	4	4

Round for 5th–6th											5th–6th place
C2	Huo Rui (CHN); Zhao Yang (CHN)	3	2	3	3	2
D1	Zhang Zhuo (CHN); Ren Changsheng (CHN)	5	4	5	5	4					D1	Zhang Zhuo (CHN); Ren Changsheng (CHN)	2	2	4	1	5	1
C1	Shigeo Nakahori (JPN); Tsuneo Takagawa (JPN)	3	7	3	4	0	1	4	9	7	C1	Shigeo Nakahori (JPN); Tsuneo Takagawa (JPN)	4	4	6	4	3	4
D2	Yasuhito Mitsuishi (JPN); Hikotsugu Watanabe (JPN)	5	5	5	0	4	4	1	7	1
