= Taekwondo at the 2002 Asian Games – Women's 67 kg =

Taekwondo competition

Women's 67 kg at the 2002 Asian Games
- Venue: Gudeok Gymnasium
- Date: 11 October 2002
- Competitors: 5 from 5 nations

Medalists
gold medal	Kim Su-ok	South Korea
silver medal	Chang Wan-chen	Chinese Taipei
bronze medal	Luo Wei	China
bronze medal	Veronica Domingo	Philippines

The women's welterweight (−67 kilograms) event at the 2002 Asian Games took place on October 11, 2002 at Gudeok Gymnasium, Busan, South Korea.

== Schedule ==
All times are Korea Standard Time (UTC+09:00)

Date	Time	Event
Friday, 11 October 2002	14:00	Round 1
Friday, 11 October 2002	14:00	Semifinals
Friday, 11 October 2002	19:50	Final

== Results ==
Legend

- R — Won by referee stop contest

Round 1		Semifinals		Final
		Chang Wan-chen (TPE)	3
Sinta Berliana Heru (INA)	1	Luo Wei (CHN)	1
Luo Wei (CHN)	5			Chang Wan-chen (TPE)	4
				Kim Su-ok (KOR)	6
		Veronica Domingo (PHI)	2
		Kim Su-ok (KOR)	15^{R}
