= Soft tennis at the 2002 Asian Games – Men's singles =

Men's singles at the 2002 Asian Games
- Venue: Sajik Tennis Courts
- Dates: 5–7 October 2002
- Competitors: 14 from 7 nations

Medalists
gold medal	Kim Kyung-han	South Korea
silver medal	Kim Hee-soo	South Korea
bronze medal	Liao Nan-kai	Chinese Taipei

The men's singles soft tennis event was part of the soft tennis programme and took place between October 5 and 7, at the Sajik Tennis Courts.

== Schedule ==
All times are Korea Standard Time (UTC+09:00)

Date	Time	Event
Saturday, 5 October 2002	09:00	Preliminary round
Saturday, 5 October 2002	14:10	Quarterfinals
Saturday, 5 October 2002	15:20	Semifinals
Saturday, 5 October 2002	16:30	3rd–6th finals
Monday, 7 October 2002	13:00	Final

== Results ==
=== Preliminary round ===
==== Group A ====
Pos	Athlete	Pld	W	L	GF	GA	GD	Qualification
1	Kim Kyung-han (KOR)	2	2	0	8	0	+8	Quarterfinals
2	Liu Chia-lun (TPE)	2	1	1	4	5	−1	Quarterfinals
3	Abhishek Aman Jha (NEP)	2	0	2	1	8	−7	

Source: Report

	Score		Game						
	Score		1	2	3	4	5	6	7
Kim Kyung-han (KOR)	4–0	Liu Chia-lun (TPE)	6–4	4–2	4–2	4–1			
Kim Kyung-han (KOR)	4–0	Abhishek Aman Jha (NEP)	4–1	4–0	4–1	4–0			
Liu Chia-lun (TPE)	4–1	Abhishek Aman Jha (NEP)	6–4	4–2	2–4	4–1	4–1		

==== Group B ====
Pos	Athlete	Pld	W	L	GF	GA	GD	Qualification
1	Kim Hee-soo (KOR)	2	2	0	8	0	+8	Quarterfinals
2	Zhang Zhuo (CHN)	2	1	1	4	4	0	Quarterfinals
3	Richmond Paguyo (PHI)	2	0	2	0	8	−8	

Source: Report

	Score		Game						
	Score		1	2	3	4	5	6	7
Zhang Zhuo (CHN)	0–4	Kim Hee-soo (KOR)	0–4	1–4	4–6	4–6			
Zhang Zhuo (CHN)	4–0	Richmond Paguyo (PHI)	4–1	5–3	4–2	5–3			
Kim Hee-soo (KOR)	4–0	Richmond Paguyo (PHI)	5–3	4–1	5–3	4–2			

==== Group C ====
Pos	Athlete	Pld	W	L	GF	GA	GD	Qualification
1	Shigeo Nakahori (JPN)	3	3	0	12	2	+10	Quarterfinals
2	Ren Changsheng (CHN)	3	2	1	9	6	+3	Quarterfinals
3	Wenifredo de Leon (PHI)	3	1	2	6	10	−4	
4	Radnaabazaryn Bayartogtokh (MGL)	3	0	3	3	12	−9	

Source: Report

	Score		Game						
	Score		1	2	3	4	5	6	7
Shigeo Nakahori (JPN)	4–1	Ren Changsheng (CHN)	3–5	5–3	4–2	4–1	5–3		
Wenifredo de Leon (PHI)	4–2	Radnaabazaryn Bayartogtokh (MGL)	1–4	7–5	4–1	5–3	2–4	5–3	
Shigeo Nakahori (JPN)	4–1	Wenifredo de Leon (PHI)	1–4	6–4	4–1	5–3	4–2		
Ren Changsheng (CHN)	4–1	Radnaabazaryn Bayartogtokh (MGL)	5–3	2–4	4–0	4–1	8–6		
Shigeo Nakahori (JPN)	4–0	Radnaabazaryn Bayartogtokh (MGL)	4–2	4–1	4–2	4–0			
Ren Changsheng (CHN)	4–1	Wenifredo de Leon (PHI)	5–3	4–6	4–2	4–0	7–5		

==== Group D ====
Pos	Athlete	Pld	W	L	GF	GA	GD	Qualification
1	Liao Nan-kai (TPE)	3	3	0	12	3	+9	Quarterfinals
2	Shuji Komine (JPN)	3	2	1	11	6	+5	Quarterfinals
3	Düürenbayaryn Bayartsogt (MGL)	3	1	2	6	9	−3	
4	Nirmal Kaji Sthapit (NEP)	3	0	3	1	12	−11	

Source: Report

	Score		Game						
	Score		1	2	3	4	5	6	7
Liao Nan-kai (TPE)	4–3	Shuji Komine (JPN)	4–6	4–0	4–2	0–4	4–6	4–1	7–4
Nirmal Kaji Sthapit (NEP)	1–4	Düürenbayaryn Bayartsogt (MGL)	4–2	2–4	3–5	2–4	3–5		
Liao Nan-kai (TPE)	4–0	Nirmal Kaji Sthapit (NEP)	4–0	5–3	4–2	6–4			
Shuji Komine (JPN)	4–2	Düürenbayaryn Bayartsogt (MGL)	4–1	4–2	0–4	3–5	4–2	4–0	
Liao Nan-kai (TPE)	4–0	Düürenbayaryn Bayartsogt (MGL)	9–7	4–2	5–3	4–1			
Shuji Komine (JPN)	4–0	Nirmal Kaji Sthapit (NEP)	5–3	4–1	4–1	4–1			

=== Final round ===
Quarterfinals
A1	Kim Kyung-han (KOR)	4	4	3	2	6	4
C2	Ren Changsheng (CHN)	2	2	5	4	4	2
B2	Zhang Zhuo (CHN)	2	4	1	3	4	0
D1	Liao Nan-kai (TPE)	4	2	4	5	0	4
C1	Shigeo Nakahori (JPN)	4	5	4	4	4
A2	Liu Chia-lun (TPE)	0	7	1	2	1
D2	Shuji Komine (JPN)	1	0	1	3
B1	Kim Hee-soo (KOR)	4	4	4	5

Semifinals
A1	Kim Kyung-han (KOR)	4	2	5	4	1	4
D1	Liao Nan-kai (TPE)	0	4	3	1	4	1
C1	Shigeo Nakahori (JPN)	7	4	2	2	4
B1	Kim Hee-soo (KOR)	5	6	4	4	6

Final
A1	Kim Kyung-han (KOR)	4	3	1	6	1	4	7
B1	Kim Hee-soo (KOR)	0	5	4	4	4	2	2
3rd–4th place
D1	Liao Nan-kai (TPE)	11	0	9	1	4	3	7
C1	Shigeo Nakahori (JPN)	9	4	7	4	1	5	5

Round for 5th–6th								5th–6th place
C2	Ren Changsheng (CHN)	0	5	1	4	1	2
B2	Zhang Zhuo (CHN)	4	3	4	2	4	4	B2	Zhang Zhuo (CHN)	4	5	1	7	4
A2	Liu Chia-lun (TPE)	0	2	5	0	2		D2	Shuji Komine (JPN)	1	3	4	5	1
D2	Shuji Komine (JPN)	4	4	3	4	4
