= Taekwondo at the 2002 Asian Games – Women's +72 kg =

Taekwondo competition

Women's +72 kg at the 2002 Asian Games
- Venue: Gudeok Gymnasium
- Date: 13 October 2002
- Competitors: 6 from 6 nations

Medalists
gold medal	Wang I-hsien	Chinese Taipei
silver medal	Youn Hyun-jung	South Korea
bronze medal	Lee Wan Yuen	Malaysia
bronze medal	Ren Ruihong	China

The women's heavyweight (+72 kilograms) event at the 2002 Asian Games took place on October 13, 2002, at Gudeok Gymnasium, Busan, South Korea.

== Schedule ==
All times are Korea Standard Time (UTC+09:00)

Date	Time	Event
Sunday, 13 October 2002	14:00	Round 1
Sunday, 13 October 2002	14:00	Semifinals
Sunday, 13 October 2002	19:50	Final

== Results ==
Round 1		Semifinals		Final
		Lee Wan Yuen (MAS)	4
Margarita Bonifacio (PHI)	0	Wang I-hsien (TPE)	5
Wang I-hsien (TPE)	5			Wang I-hsien (TPE)	4
Ren Ruihong (CHN)	2			Youn Hyun-jung (KOR)	4
Wasittee Prasopsuk (THA)	0	Ren Ruihong (CHN)	0
		Youn Hyun-jung (KOR)	3
