= Athletics at the 2002 Asian Games – Men's marathon =

Men's marathon at the 2002 Asian Games
- Venue: Busan Asiad Main Stadium
- Date: 14 December 2002
- Competitors: 15 from 11 nations

Medalists
gold medal	Lee Bong-ju	South Korea
silver medal	Koji Shimizu	Japan
bronze medal	Ryuji Takei	Japan

The men's marathon competition at the 2002 Asian Games in Busan, South Korea was held on 14 October at the Busan Asiad Main Stadium.

== Schedule ==
All times are Korea Standard Time (UTC+09:00)

Date	Time	Event
Monday, 14 October 2002	15:00	Final

== Records ==
Prior to this competition, the existing world, Asian and Games records were as follows.

World Record	Khalid Khannouchi (USA)	2:05:38	London, United Kingdom	14 April 2002
Asian Record	Toshinari Takaoka (JPN)	2:06:16	Chicago, United States	13 October 2002
Games Record	Takeyuki Nakayama (JPN)	2:08:21	Seoul, South Korea	5 October 1986

== Results ==
Legend

- DNF — Did not finish

Rank	Athlete	Time	Notes
1st place, gold medalist(s)	Lee Bong-ju (KOR)	2:14:04	
2nd place, silver medalist(s)	Koji Shimizu (JPN)	2:17:47	
3rd place, bronze medalist(s)	Ryuji Takei (JPN)	2:18:38	
4	Lim Jin-soo (KOR)	2:21:08	
5	Foaad Ali Abubaker (QAT)	2:25:27	
6	Gong Ke (CHN)	2:27:50	
7	Arjun Kumar Basnet (NEP)	2:28:23	
8	Roy Vence (PHI)	2:28:51	
9	Jumah Omar Al-Noor (QAT)	2:30:11	
10	Allan Ballester (PHI)	2:32:12	
11	I Gusti Gede Karangasem (INA)	2:34:30	
12	Yam Bahadur Pudasaini (NEP)	2:36:21	
13	Zaw Min Htwe (MYA)	2:41:27	
14	Xavier do Rego (TMP)	2:41:36	
—	Sergey Zabavsky (TJK)	DNF	
