= Kōji Shimizu =

Japanese long-distance runner

Koji Shimizu (清水康次, Shimizu Kōji; born October 17, 1969) is a retired male long-distance runner from Japan. He set his personal best (2:08:28) in the men's marathon event on March 2, 2003 at the Lake Biwa Marathon.

== International competitions ==
Year	Competition	Venue	Position	Event	Notes
Representing Japan
1997	World Championships	Athens, Greece	58th	Marathon	2:37:11
1999	World Championships	Seville, Spain	7th	Marathon	2:15:50
2002	Asian Games	Busan, South Korea	2nd	Marathon	2:17:47
2003	World Championships	Paris, France	21st	Marathon	2:13:19

== Marathons ==
Year	Competition	Venue	Position	Notes
1997	Tokyo Marathon	Tokyo, Japan	1st	2:10:09
1998	Lake Biwa Marathon	Ōtsu, Japan	3rd	2:09:57
1999	Tokyo Marathon	Tokyo, Japan	3rd	2:09:00
2000	Tokyo Marathon	Tokyo, Japan	8th	2:10:41
2001	Fukuoka Marathon	Fukuoka, Japan	2nd	2:09:28
2003	Lake Biwa Marathon	Ōtsu, Japan	4th	2:08:28
