= Wushu at the 2002 Asian Games – Men's sanshou 56 kg =

Men's sanshou 56 kg at the 2002 Asian Games
- Venue: Minseok Sports Center
- Dates: 10–13 October 2002
- Competitors: 14 from 14 nations

Medalists
gold medal	Sanchai Chomphuphuang	Thailand
silver medal	Marvin Sicomen	Philippines
bronze medal	Ölziibadrakhyn Saruul-Od	Mongolia
bronze medal	Yeh Chun-chang	Chinese Taipei

The men's sanshou 56 kilograms at the 2002 Asian Games in Busan, South Korea was held from 10 to 13 October at the Dongseo University Minseok Sports Center.

A total of 14 men from 14 different countries competed in this event, limited to fighters whose body weight was less than 56 kilograms.

Sanchai Chomphuphuang from Thailand won the gold medal after beating Rexel Nganhayna of the Philippines in gold medal bout 2–1, The bronze medal was shared by Ölziibadrakhyn Saruul-Od from Mongolia and Yeh Chun-chang of Chinese Taipei.

== Schedule ==
All times are Korea Standard Time (UTC+09:00)

Date	Time	Event
Thursday, 10 October 2002	15:30	1st preliminary round
Friday, 11 October 2002	14:00	Quarterfinals
Saturday, 12 October 2002	16:00	Semifinals
Sunday, 13 October 2002	14:30	Final

== Results ==
Legend

- KO — Won by knockout
- RET — Won by retirement

1st preliminary round
Wu Chi Kit (MAC)	0
Ölziibadrakhyn Saruul-Od (MGL)	2
Alexander Edward Marentek (INA)	0
Rexel Nganhayna (PHI)	2
Diệp Bảo Minh (VIE)	2
Langsanh Masopha (LAO)	0
Yeh Chun-chang (TPE)	2
Mirbek Suiumbaev (KGZ)	0
Ramin Movahednia (IRI)	1
Kim Dae-hyo (KOR)	2
Saken Mussakulov (KAZ)	0
Sanchai Chomphuphuang (THA)	2

Quarterfinals
Wong Ting Hong (HKG)	1
Ölziibadrakhyn Saruul-Od (MGL)	2
Rexel Nganhayna (PHI)	KO
Diệp Bảo Minh (VIE)
Yeh Chun-chang (TPE)	2
Kim Dae-hyo (KOR)	0
Sanchai Chomphuphuang (THA)	2
Youness Yassine (LIB)	0

Semifinals
Ölziibadrakhyn Saruul-Od (MGL)	0
Rexel Nganhayna (PHI)	2
Yeh Chun-chang (TPE)
Sanchai Chomphuphuang (THA)	RET

Final
Rexel Nganhayna (PHI)	1
Sanchai Chomphuphuang (THA)	2
