= Youn Hyun-jung =

South Korean taekwondo practitioner

Personal information
- Nationality: South Korean
- Born: 14 March 1979 (age 47)

Sport
- Sport: Taekwondo
Medal record
Representing South Korea
Women's taekwondo
World Championships
| Gold medal – first place | 2003 Garmisch-Partenkirchen | Heavyweight |
Asian Games
| Silver medal – second place | 2002 Busan | +72 kg |

Youn Hyun-jung (born 14 March 1979) is a South Korean taekwondo practitioner.

She won a gold medal in heavyweight at the 2003 World Taekwondo Championships in Garmisch-Partenkirchen, by defeating Chen Zhong in the semifinal, and Nataša Vezmar in the final. She won a silver medal at the 2002 Asian Games, after being defeated by Wang I-hsien in the final.
