= Wang I-hsien =

Taiwanese taekwondo practitioner

Personal information
- Nationality: Taiwanese
- Born: 20 December 1980 (age 45)

Sport
- Sport: Taekwondo
Medal record
Representing Chinese Taipei
Women's taekwondo
World Championships
Silver medal – second place	2001 Jeju	Heavyweight
Asian Games
Gold medal – first place	2002 Busan	+72 kg

Wang I-hsien (Chinese: 王怡嫻; pinyin: Wáng Yíxián; born 20 December 1980) is a Taiwanese taekwondo practitioner.

She won a silver medal in heavyweight at the 2001 World Taekwondo Championships, after being defeated by Sin Kyung-hyen in the final. She won a gold medal at the 2002 Asian Games, by defeating Youn Hyun-jung in the final.
