= Cambodia at the 2002 Asian Games =

- IOC code: CAM
- NOC: National Olympic Committee of Cambodia

in Busan
- Competitors: 17
- Medals: Gold 0 Silver 0 Bronze 0 Total 0

Asian Games appearances (overview)
- 1954; 1958; 1962; 1966; 1970; 1974; 1978–1990; 1994; 1998; 2002; 2006; 2010; 2014; 2018; 2022; 2026

Cambodia participated in the 2002 Asian Games held in Busan, South Korea, from September 29 to October 14, 2002.

== Athletics ==
Nepal competed in athletics.

Key

- Note–Ranks given for track events are within the athlete's heat only
- Q = Qualified for the next round
- q = Qualified for the next round as a fastest loser or, in field events, by position without achieving the qualifying target
- qR = Qualified to the next round by referee judgement
- NR = National record
- N/A = Round not applicable for the event
- Bye = Athlete not required to compete in round

Track & road events
Men

Athlete	Event	Heat		Semifinal		Final	
Athlete	Event	Time	Rank	Time	Rank	Time	Rank
Pich Kong	400 m	52.78	7	Did not advance			
Pich Kong	800 m	2:07.89	9	Did not advance			

== Boxing ==
Cambodia participated in boxing.

Men

Athlete	Event	Preliminary 1	Preliminary 2	Quarterfinals	Semifinals	Final
Athlete	Event	Opposition Result	Opposition Result	Opposition Result	Opposition Result	Rank
Mak Sophat	Light flyweight	Bye	Pannon (THA); L KO	Did not advance		
Roeung Sarath	Flyweight	Otgonchuluuny (MGL); L RSCO	Did not advance			
Mean Soeurn	Bantamweight	Bye	Tolen Kanatov (THA); L RSCO	Did not advance		
Troeung Sosvannak	Featherweight	Chong (MAC); W RSCO	Jahongir Abdullaev (KGZ); L 44-26	Did not advance		
Sam Sokunthea	Lightweight	Bye	Sayotha (THA); L RSCO	Did not advance		
Ath Samreth	Welterweight	Boonjumnong (THA); L RSCH	Did not advance			

== Swimming ==
Cambodia participated in swimming.

=== Men ===
Athlete	Event	Heats		Final	
Athlete	Event	Time	Rank	Time	Rank
Hem Kiry	50 m freestyle	27.71	29	Did not advance	
Hem Kiry	100 m freestyle	1:00.13	29	Did not advance	

=== Women ===
Athlete	Event	Heats		Final	
Athlete	Event	Time	Rank	Time	Rank
Ven Malyno	100 m breaststroke	1:40.94	17	Did not advance	

== Taekwondo ==
Nepal participated in taekwondo.

Men

Athlete	Event	First Round	Second Round	Quarterfinals	Semifinal	Final	
Athlete	Event	Opposition score	Opposition score	Opposition score	Opposition score	Opposition score	Rank
Ek Sithouen	-54 kg	Bye	Ogiy (UZB); L 3-5	Did not advance			
Cheat Khemara	-58 kg	Bye	Go (PHI); L 0-6	Did not advance			
Bout Vichet	-62 kg	Ahmed (QAT); W 4-6	Gholamzadeh (IRI); L 7-3	Did not advance			
Mao Sophal	-67 kg	Bye	Tashi (BHU); L 3-4	Did not advance			
In Phanna	-72 kg	Bye	Al-Najar (KSA); W DQ	Saei (IRI); L 0-13	Did not advance		
Meng Sokry	-84 kg	Bye	Phan (VIE); L 2-0	Did not advance			
