= Chang Wan-chen =

Taiwanese taekwondo practitioner

Personal information
- Nationality: Taiwanese
- Born: 29 September 1979 (age 46)

Sport
- Sport: Taekwondo
Medal record
Representing Chinese Taipei
Women's taekwondo
World Championships
Silver medal – second place	2001 Jeju	Welterweight
Bronze medal – third place	1999 Edmonton	Welterweight
Asian Games
Silver medal – second place	2002 Busan	-67 kg

Chang Wan-chen (Chinese: 張婉真; pinyin: Zhāng Wǎnzhēn; born 29 September 1979) is a Taiwanese taekwondo practitioner.

She won a bronze medal in welterweight at the 1999 World Taekwondo Championships, and a silver medal at the 2001 World Taekwondo Championships. She won a silver medal at the 2002 Asian Games.
