= Kim Yeon-ji (taekwondo) =

South Korean taekwondo practitioner

Personal information
- Nationality: South Korean
- Born: 12 May 1981 (age 45)

Sport
- Sport: Taekwondo
Medal record
Representing South Korea
Women's taekwondo
World Championships
Gold medal – first place	2001 Jeju	Lightweight
Gold medal – first place	2003 Garmisch-Partenkirchen	Lightweight
Asian Games
Gold medal – first place	2002 Busan	Lightweight

Kim Yeon-ji (born 12 May 1981) is a South Korean taekwondo practitioner.

She won a gold medal in lightweight at the 2001 World Taekwondo Championships, and another gold medal in lightweight at the 2003 World Taekwondo Championships in Garmisch-Partenkirchen. She won a gold medal at the 2002 Asian Games.
