= Wang Ying (taekwondo) =

Chinese taekwondo practitioner

Personal information
- Nationality: Chinese
- Born: 15 February 1984 (age 42)

Sport
- Sport: Taekwondo
Medal record
Representing China
Women's taekwondo
World Championships
| Gold medal – first place | 2005 Madrid | Flyweight |
| Silver medal – second place | 2003 Garmisch-Partenkirchen | Finweight |
Asian Games
| Bronze medal – third place | 2002 Busan | -47 kg |

Wang Ying (born 15 February 1984) is a Chinese taekwondo practitioner.

She won a silver medal at the 2003 World Taekwondo Championships. She won a gold medal in flyweight at the 2005 World Taekwondo Championships in Madrid, by defeating Brigitte Yagüe in the final. She won a bronze medal at the 2002 Asian Games.
