= Roia Zamani =

Afghan Taekwondo practitioner

Roia Zamani رویا زمانی
Personal information
- Nationality: Afghan

Sport
- Country: Afghanistan
- Sport: Taekwondo
- Event: Middleweight class
- Turned pro: 2002

Achievements and titles
- Regional finals: 2002 Asian Games: 72 kg – Bronze
Medal record
Women's taekwondo
Representing Afghanistan
Asian Games
Bronze medal – third place	2002 Busan	72 kg class

Roia Zamani is a taekwondo practitioner from Afghanistan, who is perhaps best known for her bronze medal finish at the 2002 Asian Games held in Busan, South Korea. Zamani, who wears a headscarf under her helmet, won a bronze medal in the 72 kg middleweight class of taekwondo without winning a single match. Zamani was the only medalist from Afghan side. None of the remaining athletes advanced past the qualifying stages.

== Personal life ==
Zamani's family moved from Afghanistan to the neighboring country of Iran, after the Taliban seized control in 1996. Zamani, along with her family, lived in Iran for six years as a refugee, and studied taekwondo there. In 2002, Zamani returned to her homeland and began working as an English teacher in Kabul. Like other Muslim athletes from Middle East, Zamani wears a headscarf under her helmet when competing.

== 2002 Asian Games ==
Afghanistan returned to the Asian Games after the fall of the Taliban government in the midst of the ongoing war in Afghanistan. The Afghan delegation consisted of forty male and four female competitors. Three out of these four women athletes participated in taekwondo, in which total 70 female competitors from different Asian countries competed between October 10 and 13.

Aged 23 at that time, Zamani competed in the 72 kg (middleweight) class. Only five athletes participated in this event, making first round a quarterfinal match. She received a bye in her first round match. In the semifinal, she withdrew in the middle of match due to severe injuries, in which she was lagging behind by nil to four points. Zamani was beaten by her Korean opponent, Choi Jin-Mi, who left a cut over her right eyebrow. But the semifinal appearance of Zamani guaranteed her a bronze medal, which she shared with Sally Solis of Philippines. Zamani considered her participation in the Games as a "first step" for Afghan women. None of the remaining athletes advanced past the qualifying stages, and as such did not win any medals.

== See also ==
- Afghanistan at the 2002 Asian Games
