= Afghanistan at the 2002 Asian Games =

- IOC code: AFG
- NOC: Afghanistan National Olympic Committee

in Busan
- Competitors: 44 in 7 sports
- Officials: 12
- Medals Ranked 36th: Gold 0 Silver 0 Bronze 1 Total 1

Asian Games appearances (overview)
- 1951; 1954; 1958; 1962; 1966; 1970; 1974; 1978; 1982; 1986; 1990; 1994; 1998; 2002; 2006; 2010; 2014; 2018; 2022; 2026

Afghanistan participated in the 2002 Asian Games held in Busan, South Korea, from September 29 to October 14, 2002. This marked Afghanistan's return to international sporting events after the fall of the Taliban regime. The Afghan delegation consisted of 12 officials (11 men and one woman) and 44 competitors (40 men and four women) participating in seven different sports. The Afghanistan national football team played its first international match since the 1984 AFC Asian Cup qualification phase. An English teacher from Kabul, Roia Zamani, won a bronze medal in the 72 kg middleweight class of taekwondo without winning a single match. Zamani was the only medalist for the Afghan side and the first Afghan medalist in 20 years. None of the remaining athletes advanced past the qualifying stages.

== Background ==
Afghanistan is a member of the South Asian zone of the Olympic Council of Asia, and has competed in the Asian Games since the inaugural edition of the Games in 1951 in New Delhi. On September 26, 1996, the Taliban annexed the Kabul and established the Islamic Emirate of Afghanistan. Under the Taliban regime all types of sporting activities were deprecated, as according to the Taliban, most of them were against the teachings of Islam and Islamic law. Many stadiums, like Ghazi Stadium of Kabul, were either destroyed or converted into venues for public executions and punishments. Women were banned from taking part in any type of sport; male athletes were allowed to participate in a few sports, but were forced to wear long sleeves, trousers and beards. Following such incidents and discrimination against women, the International Olympic Committee (IOC) banned Afghanistan National Olympic Committee and barred them from taking part in the Olympic Games.

A few months before the 2000 Summer Olympics, the IOC offered the Afghanistan National Olympic Committee the opportunity to send a contingent to the Games without the Taliban flag. The Committee declined to take part on this condition.

Participation of Afghan sportsmen without representing the Emirate (Afghanistan) and its flag will mean nothing. We will not send anyone on an individual basis

— Abdul Shukoor Mutmaen

Afghanistan did not send any delegation to the 1998 Asian Games held in Bangkok, Thailand, due to economic difficulties. Laws implemented by the Taliban government also made it impossible for Afghan athletes to compete. For example, the International Boxing Association (AIBA) does not allow players to have beards and mustaches, but Afghan males were forbidden to cut their facial hair. Afghanistan returned to the Asian Games after the fall of the Taliban government in the midst of ongoing war. In June 2003, the IOC lifted the suspension imposed on Afghanistan during the 115th IOC Session in Prague.

== Delegation ==
The delegation of Afghanistan for the 14th edition of the Asian Games was composed of 12 officials (11 men and one woman) and 44 competitors (40 men and four women) participating in seven different sports—boxing (6), cycling (1), football (20), karate (1), shooting (1), taekwondo (7) and wrestling (8).

== Boxing ==
Six Afghan pugilists went to the Games, competing in six out of the 12 boxing events. No Afghan competitor made it past the preliminary stages of competition. Three—Dawood Mahmoude (light flyweight), Rohullah Mustafa (flyweight) and Tamim Ahmed Akhtari (lightweight)—out of six boxers lost after RSCO (Referee Stopped Contest – Outclassed Opponent). Abdullah Shekib retired during his bout against Kazakhstani Gennady Golovkin. Sadeq Naqshbande lost to Sergey Rychko of Kazakhstan after referee stopped the contest (RSC). Sayed Haroon Sadat was the only Afghan boxer who completed his bout, losing to Kumar Adhikari of Nepal by a points difference of 11–13.

Athlete	Event	Preliminary	Quarterfinal	Semifinal	Final		Ref
Athlete	Event	Opposition Result	Opposition Result	Opposition Result	Opposition Result	Rank	Ref
Dawood Mahmoude	Light flyweight (48 kg)	Kim Un-Chol (PRK); L RSCO	Did not advance				
Rohullah Mustafa	Flyweight (51 kg)	Zou Gang (CHN); L RSCO	Did not advance				
Tamim Ahmed Akhtari	Lightweight (60 kg)	Ramanand (IND); L RSCO	Did not advance				
Sayed Haroon Sadat	Light welterweight (63.5 kg)	Kumar Adhikari (NEP); L 11–13	Did not advance				
Sadeq Naqshbande	Welterweight (67 kg)	Sergey Rychko (KAZ); L RSC	Did not advance				
Abdullah Shekib	Light middleweight (71 kg)	Gennady Golovkin (KAZ); L RET	Did not advance				

== Cycling ==
Mohammad Bahrooz was the only cyclist in the delegation of Afghanistan. He represented his nation in the men's 169.4 km individual road race event held on October 3 at the Road Cycle Race Stadium. A total of 28 competitors participated in the event; Bahrooz was one of six who did not finish the race. The event was won by Sergey Krushevskiy of Uzbekistan with a time of 4:17:59.

== Football ==
Afghanistan sent its men's national team to compete in the football event of the Games. The last international match played by Afghanistan against any nation was during the qualification stage for the AFC Asian Cup in 1984. For the 2002 Asian Games, the international governing body of football, FIFA, provided financial aid to the Afghanistan Football Federation to make their trip to Busan possible. The team did not advance beyond the preliminary round, losing all three of their matches.

Team roster

No.	Player	Position
1	Jamshed	GK
2	Mehdi Amirvabadi	MF
3	Mohammad Nasim	DF
4	Bashir Ahmad Saadat	DF
5	Ratil Ahmad	DF
6	Mohammad Nasim Hossani	MF
7	Mohamed Zaki	FW
8	Ateeq Ullah	MF
9	Sayed Dawood Shah	MF
10	Najebullah Karimi	MF
11	Mir Shafiq Ullah	MF
12	Mohammad Sadiq	GK
13	Mohammad Khalid	MF
14	Mohammad Zarif	DF
15	Abolfazl Hajizadeh Kojabadi	MF
16	Rahman Ali Nzari	MF
17	Khalil Ahmad	DF
18	Sayed Maqsood	MF
19	Elias Ahmed Mnucher	FW
20	Ahmad Zia Azimi	DF

Team	Pld	W	D	L	GF	GA	GD	Pts
Iran	3	2	1	0	13	1	+12	7
Qatar	3	1	2	0	13	2	+11	5
Lebanon	3	1	1	1	12	3	+9	4
Afghanistan	3	0	0	3	0	32	−32	0

The first match of the Afghan team was scheduled with Iran on September 28 at the Busan Gudeok Stadium. The Iranian team dominated the match, winning by a score of 10 to 0. Alireza Vahedi Nikbakht scored five goals in the match. This was the largest margin of victory for Iran in the tournament. Iran would win the gold medal after defeating Japan in the final.

September 28
16:33

Afghanistan	0 – 10	Iran
		Nikbakht 11', 32', 51', 52', 85'; Nekounam 36', 65'; Golmohammadi 60'; Daei 88', 90'

Gudeok Stadium, Busan

Afghanistan and Qatar played on October 1 at the Munsu Cup Stadium. The Qatar team registered their biggest win of the tournament, defeating Afghan team by a score of 11 to 0. Qatari striker Sayed Ali Bechir scored four goals in the match.

October 1
16:33

Qatar	11 – 0	Afghanistan
Bechir 26', 28', 43', 69'; Gholam 31'; B. Abdulrahman 34', 75'; Daoud 51'; Mufleh 65'; Hamzah 74'; Rizik 77'

Munsu Cup Stadium, Ulsan

The last match for the Afghan team was with Lebanon on October 5 at the Changwon Civic Stadium. The Lebanese team defeated Afghanistan by 11–0, Lebanon's largest margin of victory in the tournament. Lebanon scored five goals in the first half and six in the second.

October 5
16:33

Lebanon	11 – 0	Afghanistan
Kassas 8', 16', 80'; Al-Jamal 33', 45'; Hijazi 35'; Ghoson 53', 61', 90'; Atwi 74'; Zein 87'

Civil Stadium, Changwon

== Karate ==
Wahid Ahmad Joya competed in the kumite −75 kg event of karate held in the Yangsan College Gymnasium. Joya received a bye in the preliminary round. In the next round, the quarterfinals, Joya met with Farman Ahmed of Pakistan, but Joya was officially disqualified for being overweight.

== Shooting ==
Malalai Afzali was scheduled to compete in the women's 10 m air pistol event held in the Changwon International Shooting Range on October 3, but did not start the event.

== Taekwondo ==
Afghanistan's taekwondo squad consisted of seven athletes, four of which were men: Farhad Qraishi (−58 kg), Ziaullah Aimal (−62 kg), Hamed Stanekzai (−72 kg) and Parwiz Nazari (−84 kg), and three women: Hakima Khashai (−55 kg), Fatima Hamidi (−63 kg) and Roia Zamani (−72 kg). Qraishi, Aimal and Stanekzai were eliminated in their respective first round matches. Nazari received a bye in his first match, and lost to Dindo Simpao of Philippines in the second round.

Hakima Khashai and Fatima Hamidi both were defeated by Malaysian opponents after the referee stopped the contest (RSC). Roia Zamani, an English teacher from Kabul, won a bronze medal in the 72 kg middleweight class without winning a single match. Only five athletes participated in the middleweight class event, making first round a quarterfinal match. She received a bye in her first round match. In the semifinal, she withdrew in the middle of match due to severe injuries, in which she was lagging behind by nil to four points. Zamani was beaten by her Korean opponent, Choi Jin-Mi, who left a cut over her right eyebrow. But the semifinal appearance of Zamani guaranteed her a bronze medal, which she shared with Sally Solis of Philippines. Zamani considered her participation in the Games as a "first step" for Afghan women.

Men

Athlete	Event	Round 1	Round 2	Round 3	Semifinal	Final
Farhad Qraishi	−58 kg	Eduord Hegai (UZB); L 0–7	Did not advance			
Ziaullah Aimal	−62 kg	Rashid Ahmedov (UZB); L 1–1	Did not advance			
Hamed Stanekzai	−72 kg	Niranjan Shrestha (NEP); L 1–5	Did not advance			
Parwiz Nazari	−84 kg	Bye	Dindo Simpao (PHI); L 1–5	Did not advance		

Women

Athlete	Event	Round 1	Round 2	Semifinal	Final
Hakima Khashai	−55 kg	Elaine Teo (MAS); L RSC	Did not advance		
Fatima Hamidi	−63 kg	Lee Pei Fen (MAS); L RSC	NA	Did not advance	
Roia Zamani	−72 kg	Bye	NA	Choi Jin-Mi (KOR); L WD	Did not advance

== Wrestling ==
Eight Afghan wrestlers entered the competition: six for freestyle events and two for Greco-Roman events. Only two freestyle competitors—Mirdad Mir and Iqbal Ahmad Mancher—achieved victories. Mancher advanced to a repechage round, but lost to Wang Yuanyuan of China by a points difference of 0–10. Both the Greco-Roman wrestlers—Abdullahbik Baikzada and Mohammad Ashraf Timori—were eliminated in the preliminary rounds without winning a single bout.

Freestyle

Athlete	Event	Preliminary rounds			Repechage	1/2 finals	Final	Rank
Athlete	Event	Round 1	Round 2	Round 3	Repechage	1/2 finals	Final	Rank
Mohammad Nader Mir	60 kg	Doi Dang Hy (VIE); L 0–11	NA	Shokinder Tomar (IND); L 0–11	NA	Did not advance		
Mirdad Mir	66 kg	Norjingiin Bayarmagnai (MGL); L 0–8	Kamal Hossain (BAN); W 9–0	Eradj Davlatov (TJK); W 3–2	NA	Did not advance		
Shirjan Ahmadi	74 kg	NA	Ahmad Al-Osta (SYR); L 1–3	Si Riguleng (CHN); L 7–2	NA	Did not advance		
Jumakhan Ahmadi	84 kg	NA	Moon Eui-Jae (KOR); L 0–10	Hani Al-Marafy (JOR); L 1–4	NA	Did not advance		
Iqbal Ahmad Mancher	96 kg	NA	Magomed Ibragimov (UZB); L 0–10	Marcus Valda (PHI); W 5–4	Wang Yuanyuan (CHN); L 0–10	Did not advance		
Mohammad Alam Nooristani	120 kg	NA	Shin Jung-Hoon (KOR); L 0–7	Akihito Tanaka (JPN); L 0–11	Did not advance			

Greco-Roman

Athlete	Event	Preliminary rounds			Repechage	1/2 finals	Final	Rank
Athlete	Event	Round 1	Round 2	Round 3	Repechage	1/2 finals	Final	Rank
Abdullahbik Baikzada	74 kg	Shin Jung-Hoon (PHI); L 0–4 (Fall)	Katsuhiko Nagata (JPN); L 0–10	Danil Khalimov (KAZ); L 0–11	NA	Did not advance		
Mohammad Ashraf Timori	84 kg	Li Junmin (CHN); L 0–4 (Fall)	Azamat Erkimbaev (KGZ); L 0–4 (Fall)	Kim Jung-Sub (KOR); L 0–15	Did not advance			

== See also ==
- Afghanistan at the 2004 Summer Olympics
- Afghanistan at the 2006 Asian Games
