= Jordan at the 2002 Asian Games =

- IOC code: JOR
- NOC: Jordan Olympic Committee

in Busan
- Medals Ranked 34th: Gold 0 Silver 0 Bronze 2 Total 2

Asian Games appearances (overview)
- 1986; 1990; 1994; 1998; 2002; 2006; 2010; 2014; 2018; 2022; 2026

Jordan participated in the 2002 Asian Games held in Busan, South Korea, from September 29 to October 14, 2002. Athletes from Jordan won overall two medals, all bronze, and clinched 34th spot in the medal table.
