= Busan Gudeok Stadium =

Stadium in Busan, South Korea

Gudeok Stadium
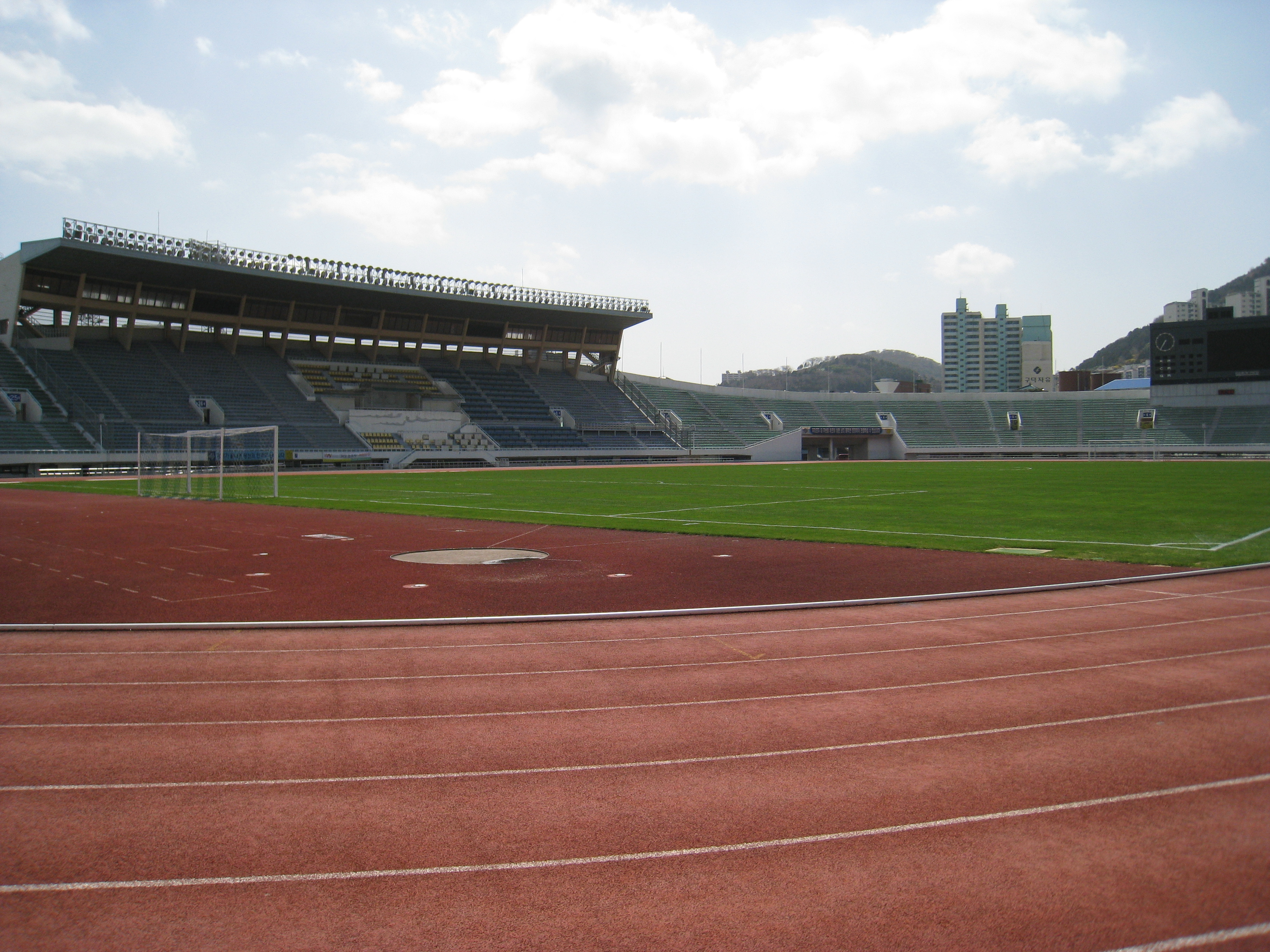
- Interactive map of Gudeok Stadium
- Former names: Busan Municipal Stadium
- Location: 57, Mangyang-ro, Seo-gu, Busan, South Korea
- Coordinates: 35°06′59″N 129°00′52″E
- Owner: Busan Metropolitan City Hall
- Operator: Busan Sports Facility Management
- Capacity: 12,349
- Surface: Natural grass

Construction
- Opened: 26 September 1928
- Renovated: 1973

Tenants
- Busan IPark (1983–2002, 2016–2021, 2023–present); Busan Transportation Corporation (2006–2021, 2023–present)

- Busan Gudeok Stadium
- Hangul: 부산 구덕 운동장
- Hanja: 釜山九德運動場
- RR: Busan Gudeok undongjang
- MR: Pusan Kudŏk undongjang

The Busan Gudeok Stadium (Korean: 부산 구덕 운동장) is a multi-purpose stadium in Busan, South Korea. The stadium is used mostly for football matches and can accommodate 12,349 spectators. The venue opened in September 1928 as Busan Municipal Stadium (부산 공설 운동장). During the 1988 Summer Olympics, it hosted some of the football matches. It was also the main venue for the 1997 East Asian Games, hosting the opening and closing ceremonies, as well as the athletics and football competitions. Football club Busan IPark played their home games at the venue between 1983 and 2002. Additionally, Busan Transport Corporation have played their home games at the venue since 2006.

== History ==
=== 1959 crowd crush ===
On 17 July 1959, 67 people died after heavy rains caused a crowd to rush into a narrow entrance.

=== 1988 Summer Olympics ===
During the 1988 Summer Olympics, held in Seoul, eight football games took place at the Gudeok stadium, including all three of South Korea's matches and one semi-final match. 180 players accompanied by 72 officials from nine countries competed for eleven days (17–27 September), attracting a total of 146,320 spectators or 18,290 on average per day. A total of 675 million won was spent on the stadium before the tournament to improve the electronic scoreboard and other facilities.

Date	Team 1	Result	Team 2	Round	Attendance
17 September 1988	West Germany	3–0	China	Group A	24,000
18 September 1988	South Korea	0–0	Soviet Union	Group C	30,000
19 September 1988	West Germany	4–1	Tunisia	Group A	14,000
20 September 1988	South Korea	0–0	United States	Group C	22,000
21 September 1988	Tunisia	0–0	China	Group A	17,000
22 September 1988	Argentina	2–1	South Korea	Group C	30,000
25 September 1988	Soviet Union	3–0	Australia	Quarter-final	5,000
27 September 1988	Soviet Union	3–2 (a.e.t.)	Italy	Semi-final	10,000
