= Chinese Taipei at the 2002 Asian Games =

- IOC code: TPE
- NOC: Chinese Taipei Olympic Committee

in Busan
- Medals Ranked 8th: Gold 10 Silver 17 Bronze 25 Total 52

Asian Games appearances (overview)
- 1954; 1958; 1962; 1966; 1970; 1974–1986; 1990; 1994; 1998; 2002; 2006; 2010; 2014; 2018; 2022; 2026

Flag of the Republic of China

Chinese Taipei (Taiwan) participated in the 2002 Asian Games held in Busan, South Korea, from September 29 to October 14, 2002. Athletes from Taiwan won overall 52 medals (including 10 golds), and clinched eighth spot in the medal table.
