= 2004–05 FINA Swimming World Cup =

Athletic competition

The 2004–05 FINA Swimming World Cup was a series of eight short-course (25m) meets, held in 8 cities from November 2004 through February 2005.

South Africa's Ryk Neethling (male) and Sweden's Anna-Karin Kammerling (female) were named the top swimmers of the series.

== Meets ==
Year	Dates	Location	External Results
2 0 0 4	November 19–21	Durban, South Africa	OmegaTiming.com
2 0 0 4	November 26–28	Melbourne, Australia	OmegaTiming.com
2 0 0 4	December 2–3	Daejon, South Korea	USA Swimming
2 0 0 5	January 18–19	Stockholm, Sweden	OmegaTiming.com
2 0 0 5	January 22–23	Berlin, Germany	OmegaTiming.com
2 0 0 5	January 26–27	Moscow, Russia	OmegaTiming.com
2 0 0 5	February 11–12	New York (East Meadow, NY) (United States)	OmegaTiming.com
2 0 0 5	February 18–20	Belo Horizonte, Brazil	CBDA page

== Event Winners ==
Note: Time listed in the heading are the series records at the start of the 2004-05 World Cup. Bettered records are marked with a "WC" following the time.

=== 50 free ===
Men		Meet	Women	
Winner (Nationality) WC: Mark Foster, GBR	Time 21.13	Meet	Winner (Nationality) WC: Alison Sheppard, GBR	Time 24.06
Roland Schoeman (South Africa)	21.61	#1: Durban	(United Kingdom) Alison Sheppard (Great Britain)	24.86
Ryk Neethling (South Africa)	21.68	#2: Melbourne	Lisbeth Lenton (Australia)	24.58
Andrey Kapralov (Russia)	22.27	#3: Daejon	Sophie Edington (Australia)	25.10
Roland Schoeman (South Africa)	21.53	#4: Stockholm	Therese Alshammar (Sweden)	24.29
Roland Schoeman (South Africa)	21.45	#5: Berlin	Therese Alshammar (Sweden)	24.03 WC
(United States) Jason Lezak (USA)	21.69	#6: Moscow	Sviatlana Khakhlova (Belarus)	24.65
Ryk Neethling (South Africa)	21.44	#7: New York	Therese Alshammar (Sweden)	24.23
Ryk Neethling (South Africa)	21.44	#8: Belo Horizonte	Therese Alshammar (Sweden)	24.66

=== 100 free ===
Men		Meet	Women	
Winner (Nationality) WC: Alexander Popov, RUS	Time 46.74	Meet	Winner (Nationality) WC: Lisbeth Lenton, AUS	Time 52.64
Roland Schoeman (South Africa)	47.12	#1: Durban	Josefin Lillhage (Sweden)	54.48
Ryk Neethling (South Africa)	46.94	#2: Melbourne	Lisbeth Lenton (Australia)	53.58
Andrey Kapralov (Russia)	48.89	#3: Daejon	Martina Moravcová (Slovakia)	54.13
Roland Schoeman (South Africa)	46.45 WC	#4: Stockholm	Josefin Lillhage (Sweden)	53.26
Roland Schoeman (South Africa)	46.25 =WR	#5: Berlin	Therese Alshammar (Sweden)	53.32
Ryk Neethling (South Africa)	47.30	#6: Moscow	Josefin Lillhage (Sweden)	54.19
Roland Schoeman (South Africa)	46.27	#7: New York	Josefin Lillhage (Sweden)	53.54
Ryk Neethling (South Africa)	47.50	#8: Belo Horizonte	Therese Alshammar (Sweden)	53.39

=== 200 free ===
Men		Meet	Women	
Winner (Nationality) WC: Ian Thorpe, AUS	Time 1:41.10	Meet	Winner (Nationality) WC: Yang Yu, (CHN)	Time 1:54.90
Ryk Neethling (South Africa)	1:45.11	#1: Durban	Solenne Figuès (France)	1:56.20
Ryk Neethling (South Africa)	1:43.79	#2: Melbourne	Lisbeth Lenton (Australia)	1:56.98
Andrey Kapralov (Russia)	1:47.43	#3: Daejon	Martina Moravcová (Slovakia)	1:58.07
Ryk Neethling (South Africa)	1:43.01	#4: Stockholm	Josefin Lillhage (Sweden)	1:55.40
Ryk Neethling (South Africa)	1:42.75	#5: Berlin	Solenne Figuès (France)	1:55.42
Saulius Binevičius (Lithuania)	1:45.92	#6: Moscow	Josefin Lillhage (Sweden)	1:56.01
Ryk Neethling (South Africa)	1:43.12	#7: New York	Josefin Lillhage (Sweden)	1:54.64 WC
Ryk Neethling (South Africa)	1:45.35	#8: Belo Horizonte	(United States) Kaitlin Sandeno (USA)	1:56.68

=== 400 free ===
Men		Meet	Women	
Winner (Nationality) WC: Ian Thorpe, AUS	Time 3:34.63	Meet	Winner (Nationality) WC: Lindsay Benko, USA	Time 3:59.53
Yury Prilukov (Russia)	3:43.53	#1: Durban	(United States) Sara McLarty (USA)	4:05.36
Yury Prilukov (Russia)	3:44.23	#2: Melbourne	Stephanie Williams (Australia)	4:06.22
Yury Prilukov (Russia)	3:41.19	#3: Daejon	Meng Jiao Mi (China)	4:10.58
Yury Prilukov (Russia)	3:42.46	#4: Stockholm	(United States) Rachel Komisarz (USA)	4:06.09
Yury Prilukov (Russia)	3:43.17	#5: Berlin	Camelia Potec (Romania)	4:03.43
Yury Prilukov (Russia)	3:45.04	#6: Moscow	(United States) Rachel Komisarz (USA)	4:05.35
Yury Prilukov (Russia)	3:44.90	#7: New York	(United States) Kate Ziegler (USA)	4:05.52
Yury Prilukov (Russia)	3:44.49	#8: Belo Horizonte	Camelia Potec (Romania)	4:05.38

=== 800/1500 free ===
Men (1500 free)		Meet	Women (800 free)	
Winner (Nationality) WC: Grant Hackett, AUS	Time 14:29.51	Meet	Winner (Nationality) WC: Sachiko Yamada, JPN	Time 8:13.66
Yury Prilukov (Russia)	14:43.33	#1: Durban	(United States) Sara McLarty (USA)	8:27.46
Yury Prilukov (Russia)	14:39.67	#2: Melbourne	Stephanie Williams (Australia)	8:19.06
Yury Prilukov (Russia)	14:46.82	#3: Daejon	Meng Jiao Mi (China)	8:32.33
Yury Prilukov (Russia)	14:41.06	#4: Stockholm	Lotte Friis (Denmark)	8:25.51
Yury Prilukov (Russia)	14:38.96	#5: Berlin	Erika Villaécija García (Spain)	8:18.13
Yury Prilukov (Russia)	14:37.99	#6: Moscow	Anastasia Ivanenko (Russia)	8:20.59
Yury Prilukov (Russia)	14:44.99	#7: New York	(United States) Kate Ziegler (USA)	8:16.32
Yury Prilukov (Russia)	14:53.68	#8: Belo Horizonte	Camelia Potec (Romania)	8:31.76

=== 50 back ===
Men		Meet	Women	
Winner (Nationality) WC: Matt Welsh, AUS	Time 23.39	Meet	Winner (Nationality) WC: Hui Li, CHN	Time 26.83
Thomas Rupprath (Germany)	23.68	#1: Durban	(Germany) Antje Buschschulte (German)	27.84
Matt Welsh (Australia)	23.86	#2: Melbourne	Chang Gao (China)	27.22
Kenta Yamanoi (Japan)	24.49	#3: Daejon	Tayliah Zimmer (Australia)	27.78
(United States) Randall Bal (USA)	24.09	#4: Stockholm	Ilona Hlaváčková (Czech Republic)	27.63
Thomas Rupprath (Germany) (United States) Randall Bal (USA)	23.77	#5: Berlin	Ilona Hlaváčková (Czech Republic)	27.55
(United States) Randall Bal (USA)	24.12	#6: Moscow	Kateryna Zubkova (Ukraine)	27.45
(United States) Randall Bal (USA)	23.80	#7: New York	Ilona Hlaváčková (Czech Republic)	27.60
Thomas Rupprath (Germany)	24.28	#8: Belo Horizonte	Ilona Hlaváčková (Czech Republic)	27.88

=== 100 back ===
Men		Meet	Women	
Winner (Nationality) WC: Thomas Rupprath, GER	Time 50.58	Meet	Winner (Nationality) WC: Natalie Coughlin, USA	Time 56.71
Thomas Rupprath (Germany)	51.36	#1: Durban	(Germany) Antje Buschschulte (German)	59.51
Matt Welsh (Australia)	51.38	#2: Melbourne	Tayliah Zimmer (Australia)	59.12
Evgeny Aleshin (Russia)	52.91	#3: Daejon	Tayliah Zimmer (Australia)	59.07
(United States) Randall Bal (USA)	51.66	#4: Stockholm	Louise Ørnstedt (Denmark)	59.06
Thomas Rupprath (Germany); Markus Rogan (Austria)	51.16	#5: Berlin	Louise Ørnstedt (Denmark)	58.51; Nordic Record
(United States) Randall Bal (USA)	52.00	#6: Moscow	Kateryna Zubkova (Ukraine)	58.42
(United States) Randall Bal (USA)	51.49	#7: New York	Martina Moravcová (Slovakia)	1:00.68
Thomas Rupprath (Germany)	51.76	#8: Belo Horizonte	(Germany) Antje Buschschulte (German)	58.40

=== 200 back ===
Men		Meet	Women	
Winner (Nationality) WC: Michael Phelps, USA	Time 1:51.40	Meet	Winner (Nationality) WC: Natalie Coughlin, USA	Time 2:03.62
George Du Rand (South Africa)	1:54.77	#1: Durban	Melissa Corfe (South Africa)	2:09.22
(United States) Aaron Peirsol (USA)	1:52.29	#2: Melbourne	Tayliah Zimmer (Australia)	2:06.54
Evgeny Aleshin (Russia)	1:53.75	#3: Daejon	Tayliah Zimmer (Australia)	2:09.18
Markus Rogan (Austria)	1:52.03	#4: Stockholm	Hanae Ito (Japan)	2:07.18
Markus Rogan (Austria)	1:50.67 WC	#5: Berlin	Hanae Ito (Japan)	2:06.12
Evgeny Aleshin (Russia)	1:53.90	#6: Moscow	Hanae Ito (Japan)	2:06.65
(United States) Randall Bal (USA)	1:53.06	#7: New York	Anja Čarman (Slovenia)	2:08.53
(United States) Bryce Hunt (USA)	1:53.86	#8: Belo Horizonte	(Germany) Antje Buschschulte (German)	2:08.02

=== 50 breast ===
Men		Meet	Women	
Winner (Nationality) WC: Oleg Lisogor, UKR	Time 26.20	Meet	Winner (Nationality) WC: Brooke Hanson, AUS	Time 30.24
Roland Schoeman (South Africa)	27.26	#1: Durban	Claire Archibald (South Africa)	32.43
Brenton Rickard (Australia)	27.36	#2: Melbourne	Jade Edmistone (Australia)	30.46
Seung-Hun You (South Korea)	27.56	#3: Daejon	Kristy Morrison (Australia)	31.80
(United States) Ed Moses (USA)	26.75	#4: Stockholm	(United Kingdom) Alison Sheppard (GBR)	31.58
Oleg Lisogor (Ukraine)	26.57	#5: Berlin	Elena Bogomazova (Russia)	31.30
Oleg Lisogor (Ukraine)	26.67	#6: Moscow	Elena Bogomazova (Russia)	31.36
Oleg Lisogor (Ukraine)	26.60	#7: New York	(United States) Tara Kirk (USA)	30.85
Roman Sloudnov (Russia)	27.26	#8: Belo Horizonte	Elena Bogomazova (Russia)	31.49

=== 100 breast ===
Men		Meet	Women	
Winner (Nationality) WC: Ed Moses, USA	Time 57.47	Meet	Winner (Nationality) WC: Leisel Jones, AUS	Time 1:05.09
(United States) Ed Moses (USA)	58.35	#1: Durban	Tammy Laubscher (South Africa)	1:09.59
Brenton Rickard (Australia)	59.19	#2: Melbourne	(Australia) Leisel Jones (AUS)	1:04.90 WC
Seung-Hun You (South Korea)	1:00.01	#3: Daejon	Kristy Morrison (Australia)	1:08.32
(United States) Ed Moses (USA)	58.03	#4: Stockholm	Elena Bogomazova (Russia)	1:08.14
Oleg Lisogor (Ukraine)	57.94	#5: Berlin	Simone Weiler (Germany)	1:07.66
Oleg Lisogor (Ukraine)	58.39	#6: Moscow	Elena Bogomazova (Russia)	1:07.02
Oleg Lisogor (Ukraine)	58.41	#7: New York	(United States) Tara Kirk (USA)	1:06.52
Roman Sloudnov (Russia)	59.34	#8: Belo Horizonte	Elena Bogomazova (Russia)	1:08.29

=== 200 breast ===
Men		Meet	Women	
Winner (Nationality) WC: Ed Moses, USA	Time 2:02.92	Meet	Winner (Nationality) WC: Leisel Jones, AUS	Time 2:17.75
(United States) Ed Moses (USA)	2:05.53	#1: Durban	Tammy Laubscher (South Africa)	2:28.02
Brenton Rickard (Australia)	2:07.11	#2: Melbourne	(Australia) Leisel Jones (AUS)	2:19.08
Neil Versfeld (South Africa)	2:10.76	#3: Daejon	Josefin Wede (Sweden)	2:25.51
(United States) Ed Moses (USA)	2:05.00	#4: Stockholm	Yuko Sakaguchi (Japan)	2:26.30
Jim Piper (Australia)	2:04.03	#5: Berlin	Yuko Sakaguchi (Japan)	2:23.84
Grigory Falko (Russia)	2:06.51	#6: Moscow	Yuko Sakaguchi (Japan)	2:25.19
(United States) Ed Moses (USA)	2:07.65	#7: New York	(United States) Tara Kirk (USA)	2:25.45
Roman Sloudnov (Russia)	2:09.56	#8: Belo Horizonte	Agustina Giovanni (Argentina)	2:32.53

=== 50 fly ===
Men		Meet	Women	
Winner (Nationality) WC: Geoff Huegill, AUS	Time 22.74	Meet	Winner (Nationality) WC: Anna-Karin Kammerling, SWE	Time 25.36
Thomas Rupprath (Germany)	23.48	#1: Durban	Anna-Karin Kammerling (Sweden)	26.36
Ryk Neethling (South Africa)	23.44	#2: Melbourne	Lisbeth Lenton (Australia)	26.57
Nikolay Skvortsov (Russia)	23.87	#3: Daejon	Martina Moravcová (Slovakia)	26.65
Ryo Takayasu (Japan)	23.51	#4: Stockholm	Therese Alshammar (Sweden)	25.65
Roland Schoeman (South Africa)	22.92	#5: Berlin	Therese Alshammar (Sweden)	25.79
Ryo Takayasu (Japan)	23.44	#6: Moscow	Martina Moravcová (Slovakia)	26.77
Roland Schoeman (South Africa)	23.18	#7: New York	Therese Alshammar (Sweden)	25.79
Ryk Neethling (South Africa)	23.17	#8: Belo Horizonte	Therese Alshammar (Sweden)	25.90

=== 100 fly ===
Men		Meet	Women	
Winner (Nationality) WC: Thomas Rupprath, GER	Time 50.10	Meet	Winner (Nationality) WC: Natalie Coughlin, USA	Time 56.34
Thomas Rupprath (Germany)	51.11	#1: Durban	Martina Moravcová (Slovakia)	57.49
(United Kingdom) James Hickman (Great Britain)	51.56	#2: Melbourne	Lisbeth Lenton (Australia)	57.87
Nikolay Skvortsov (Russia)	52.02	#3: Daejon	Martina Moravcová (Slovakia)	58.33
Ryo Takayasu (Japan)	51.06	#4: Stockholm	Martina Moravcová (Slovakia)	57.25
Ryo Takayasu (Japan)	50.84	#5: Berlin	Martina Moravcová (Slovakia)	57.15
Nikolay Skvortsov (Russia)	51.39	#6: Moscow	Martina Moravcová (Slovakia)	57.08
Franck Esposito (France)	51.71	#7: New York	Martina Moravcová (Slovakia)	57.91
Nikolay Skvortsov (Russia)	51.25	#8: Belo Horizonte	(United States) Natalie Coughlin (USA)	58.71

=== 200 fly ===
Men		Meet	Women	
Winner (Nationality) WC: James Hickman, GBR	Time 1:51.76	Meet	Winner (Nationality) WC: Yang Yu, CHN	Time 2:04.04
Thomas Rupprath (Germany)	1:52.82	#1: Durban	Martina Moravcová (Slovakia)	2:06.63
Nikolay Skvortsov (Russia)	1:53.44	#2: Melbourne	Jessicah Schipper (Australia)	2:07.45
Nikolay Skvortsov (Russia)	1:52.81	#3: Daejon	You Ri Kown (South Korea)	2:08.59
Takeshi Matsuda (Japan)	1:53.59	#4: Stockholm	Mette Jacobsen (Denmark)	2:05.78
Nikolay Skvortsov (Russia)	1:53.70	#5: Berlin	Mette Jacobsen (Denmark)	2:05.90
Takeshi Matsuda (Japan)	1:54.14	#6: Moscow	Ayako Doi (Japan)	2:08.05
Franck Esposito (France)	1:54.50	#7: New York	(United States) Kaitlin Sandeno (USA)	2:07.45
Nikolay Skvortsov (Russia)	1:53.79	#8: Belo Horizonte	You Kwon (South Korea)	2:10.12

=== 100 IM ===
Men		Meet	Women	
Winner (Nationality) WC: Thomas Rupprath, GER	Time 52.58	Meet	Winner (Nationality) WC: Natalie Coughlin, USA	Time 58.80
Ryk Neethling (South Africa)	53.13	#1: Durban	Martina Moravcová (Slovakia)	1:01.23
Ryk Neethling (South Africa)	53.01	#2: Melbourne	Alice Mills (Australia)	1:00.73
Christian Keller (Germany)	55.56	#3: Daejon	Martina Moravcová (Slovakia)	1:00.96
Roland Schoeman (South Africa)	52.51 WR	#4: Stockholm	Martina Moravcová (Slovakia)	1:01.06
Ryk Neethling (South Africa)	52.11 WR	#5: Berlin	Martina Moravcová (Slovakia)	1:00.81
Ryk Neethling (South Africa)	52.01 WR	#6: Moscow	Martina Moravcová (Slovakia)	1:00.87
Ryk Neethling (South Africa)	52.77	#7: New York	Martina Moravcová (Slovakia)	1:00.73
Ryk Neethling (South Africa)	51.52 WR	#8: Belo Horizonte	(United States) Natalie Coughlin (USA)	1:01.21

=== 200 IM ===
Men		Meet	Women	
Winner (Nationality) WC: Michael Phelps, USA	Time 1:54.85	Meet	Winner (Nationality) WC: Yana Klochkova, UKR	Time 2:08.44
Dean Kent (New Zealand)	1:58.48	#1: Durban	Amanda Loots (South Africa)	2:13.06
Dean Kent (New Zealand)	1:56.87	#2: Melbourne	Helen Norfolk (New Zealand)	2:13.25
Taishi Okude (Japan)	1:59.40	#3: Daejon	Maiko Fujino (Japan)	2:12.09
Hidemasa Sano (Japan)	1:57.04	#4: Stockholm	Yang Yu (China)	2:11.42
Hidemasa Sano (Japan)	1:56.35	#5: Berlin	Yu Yang (China)	2:10.82
Ryk Neethling (South Africa)	1:57.22	#6: Moscow	Daria Beliakina (Russia)	2:13.15
Thiago Pereira (Brazil)	1:58.08	#7: New York	(United States) Kaitlin Sandeno (USA)	2:12.48
Thiago Pereira (Brazil)	1:57.99	#8: Belo Horizonte	(United States) Kaitlin Sandeno (USA)	2:14.76

=== 400 IM ===
Men		Meet	Women	
Winner (Nationality) WC: Marcel Wouda, NED	Time 4:05.41	Meet	Winner (Nationality) WC: Yana Klochkova, UKR	Time 4:27.83
Lucas Salatta (Brazil)	4:11.77	#1: Durban	(United States) Sara McLarty (USA)	4:35.57
Dean Kent (New Zealand)	4:10.03	#2: Melbourne	Helen Norfolk (New Zealand)	4:39.52
Shinya Taniguchi (Japan)	4:11.81	#3: Daejon	Maiko Fujino (Japan)	4:38.00
Hidemasa Sano (Japan)	4:07.07	#4: Stockholm	Misa Amano (Japan)	4:38.29
Hidemasa Sano (Japan)	4:07.18	#5: Berlin	Teresa Rohmann (Germany)	4:36.87
Igor Berezutsky (Russia)	4:08.20	#6: Moscow	Yana Martynova (Russia)	4:42.42
Thiago Pereira (Brazil)	4:11.35	#7: New York	(United States) Kaitlin Sandeno (USA)	4:34.98
Thiago Pereira (Brazil)	4:15.69	#8: Belo Horizonte	(United States) Kaitlin Sandeno (USA)	4:40.40
