= Bazarbek Donbay =

Olympic judoka

Personal information
- Full name: Bazarbek Orynbayuly Donbay
- Nationality: Kazakhstan
- Born: 11 June 1979 (age 47) South Kazakhstan Region, Kazakh SSR, Soviet Union
- Occupation: Judoka
- Height: 1.67 m (5 ft 5 1/2 in)
- Weight: 60 kg (132 lb)

Sport
- Sport: Judo
- Event: 60 kg
Medal record
Men's judo
Representing Kazakhstan
Asian Games
Silver medal – second place	2002 Busan	60 kg
Asian Championships
Gold medal – first place	2004 Almaty	60 kg
Bronze medal – third place	2007 Kuwait City	60 kg

Profile at external databases
- JudoInside.com: 12000

Bazarbek Orynbaiūly Donbai (Kazakh: Базарбек Орынбайулы Донбай; born 11 June 1979) is a Kazakh judoka, who competed in the men's extra-lightweight category. He held three Kazakhstan senior titles in his own division, picked up a total of twelve medals in his career, including a silver from the 2002 Asian Games in Busan, South Korea, and a gold from the 2004 Asian Judo Championships in Almaty, and represented his nation Kazakhstan in two editions of the Olympic Games (2000 and 2004).

Donbay made his official debut at the 2000 Summer Olympics in Sydney, where he competed for the Kazakh team in the men's extra-lightweight class (60 kg). He ran off two straight victories over Germany's Oliver Gussenberg and Spain's Óscar Peñas in the prelims, before falling short in an ippon and a sumi gaeshi (corner reversal) throw to South Korean judoka and eventual silver medalist Jung Bu-kyung nearly two minutes into the quarterfinal match. In the repechage, Donbay redeemed his strength to score a waza-ari point each at his own advantage over Georgia's Nestor Khergiani and Azerbaijan's Elchin Ismayilov. Donbay fulfilled his chance of reaching the bronze medal final on his Olympic debut, but nearly missed it in a defeat to Cuba's Manolo Poulot by a waza-ari awasete ippon and a seoi nage (shoulder throw) three minutes and forty-three seconds into their bout.

When South Korea hosted the 2002 Asian Games in Busan, Donbay came up strong by chance for his first career medal in the 60-kg division, but had to satisfy with a silver in his final match against Iran's Masoud Haji Akhondzadeh.

At the 2004 Summer Olympics in Athens, Donbay qualified for his second Kazakh squad in the men's extra-lightweight class (60 kg), by topping the field of judoka and receiving a berth from the Asian Championships in Almaty. Donbay opened his match with a swift ippon victory over Algeria's Omar Rebahi at fourteen seconds, before he suffered an astonishing defeat to Georgian judoka and eventual silver medalist Khergiani by a golden score draw. In the repechage, Donbay missed out on another chance for an Olympic bronze medal after he fell in a waza-ari awasete ippon and a strangle hold to Spain's Kenji Uematsu during their first playoff of the draft.
