= Swimming at the 2006 Asian Games – Women's 200 metre individual medley =

Women's 200 metre individual medley at the 2006 Asian Games
- Venue: Hamad Aquatic Centre
- Date: 7 December 2006
- Competitors: 18 from 13 nations

Medalists
gold medal	Qi Hui	China
silver medal	Asami Kitagawa	Japan
bronze medal	Maiko Fujino	Japan

The women's 200m individual medley swimming event at the 2006 Asian Games was held on December 7, 2006 at the Hamad Aquatic Centre in Doha, Qatar.

== Schedule ==
All times are Arabia Standard Time (UTC+03:00)

Date	Time	Event
Thursday, 7 December 2006	10:10	Heats
Thursday, 7 December 2006	18:05	Final

== Records ==
Prior to this competition, the existing world, Asian and Games records were as follows.

World Record	Wu Yanyan (CHN)	2:09.72	Shanghai, China	17 October 1997
Asian Record	Wu Yanyan (CHN)	2:09.72	Shanghai, China	17 October 1997
Games Record	Lin Li (CHN)	2:13.16	Beijing, China	27 September 1990

== Results ==
Legend

- DNS — Did not start

=== Heats ===
Rank	Heat	Athlete	Time	Notes
1	3	Qi Hui (CHN)	2:17.18	
2	1	Joscelin Yeo (SIN)	2:17.60	
3	1	Maiko Fujino (JPN)	2:17.62	
4	2	Asami Kitagawa (JPN)	2:17.96	
5	3	Zhang Xin (CHN)	2:19.17	
6	2	Siow Yi Ting (MAS)	2:19.56	
7	3	Lin Man-hsu (TPE)	2:20.35	
8	2	Nimitta Thaveesupsoonthorn (THA)	2:20.97	
9	1	Jung Ji-yeon (KOR)	2:21.70	
10	2	Nam Yoo-sun (KOR)	2:22.42	
11	3	Hannah Wilson (HKG)	2:22.66	
12	1	Natthanan Junkrajang (THA)	2:23.70	
13	3	Maftunabonu Tukhtasinova (UZB)	2:33.08	
14	2	Ma Cheok Mei (MAC)	2:37.27	
15	1	Choi Sin Hong (MAC)	2:38.66	
16	1	Miniruwani Samarakoon (SRI)	2:48.73	
—	2	Ameena Fakhro (QAT)	DNS	
—	3	Nivine El-Achi (LIB)	DNS	

=== Final ===
Rank	Athlete	Time	Notes
1st place, gold medalist(s)	Qi Hui (CHN)	2:11.92	GR
2nd place, silver medalist(s)	Asami Kitagawa (JPN)	2:14.51	
3rd place, bronze medalist(s)	Maiko Fujino (JPN)	2:15.21	
4	Joscelin Yeo (SIN)	2:17.11	
5	Zhang Xin (CHN)	2:17.16	
6	Siow Yi Ting (MAS)	2:17.57	
7	Nimitta Thaveesupsoonthorn (THA)	2:20.38	
8	Lin Man-hsu (TPE)	2:20.41	
