= Swimming at the 2006 Asian Games – Women's 400 metre individual medley =

Women's 400 metre individual medley at the 2006 Asian Games
- Venue: Hamad Aquatic Centre
- Date: 3 December 2006
- Competitors: 10 from 8 nations

Medalists
gold medal	Qi Hui	China
silver medal	Yu Rui	China
bronze medal	Maiko Fujino	Japan

The women's 400m individual medley swimming event at the 2006 Asian Games was held on December 3, 2006 at the Hamad Aquatic Centre in Doha, Qatar.

== Schedule ==
All times are Arabia Standard Time (UTC+03:00)

Date	Time	Event
Sunday, 3 December 2006	10:13	Heats
Sunday, 3 December 2006	18:05	Final

== Records ==
Prior to this competition, the existing world, Asian and Games records were as follows.

World Record	Yana Klochkova (UKR)	4:33.59	Sydney, Australia	16 September 2000
Asian Record	Chen Yan (CHN)	4:34.79	Shanghai, China	18 October 1997
Games Record	Lin Li (CHN)	4:39.88	Beijing, China	23 September 1990

== Results ==
=== Heats ===
Rank	Heat	Athlete	Time	Notes
1	2	Qi Hui (CHN)	4:43.52	
2	2	Maiko Fujino (JPN)	4:45.27	
3	1	Yu Rui (CHN)	4:54.39	
4	1	Nimitta Thaveesupsoonthorn (THA)	4:55.56	
5	1	Jung Ji-yeon (KOR)	4:56.26	
6	1	Lin Man-hsu (TPE)	4:58.00	
7	2	Carmen Nam (HKG)	4:59.82	
8	2	Nam Yoo-sun (KOR)	5:00.53	
9	2	Siow Yi Ting (MAS)	5:06.93	
10	1	Choi Sin Hong (MAC)	5:34.90	

=== Final ===
Rank	Athlete	Time	Notes
1st place, gold medalist(s)	Qi Hui (CHN)	4:38.31	GR
2nd place, silver medalist(s)	Yu Rui (CHN)	4:39.51	
3rd place, bronze medalist(s)	Maiko Fujino (JPN)	4:42.70	
4	Jung Ji-yeon (KOR)	4:51.27	
5	Nimitta Thaveesupsoonthorn (THA)	4:52.31	
6	Lin Man-hsu (TPE)	4:55.88	
7	Nam Yoo-sun (KOR)	4:56.56	
8	Carmen Nam (HKG)	5:00.78	
