= Argentina at the 2004 Summer Olympics =

- IOC code: ARG
- NOC: Argentine Olympic Committee
- Website: www.coarg.org.ar (in Spanish)

in Athens
- Competitors: 152 in 22 sports
- Flag bearer: Carlos Espínola (opening)
- Medals Ranked 38th: Gold 2 Silver 0 Bronze 4 Total 6

Summer Olympics appearances (overview)
- 1900; 1904; 1908; 1912; 1920; 1924; 1928; 1932; 1936; 1948; 1952; 1956; 1960; 1964; 1968; 1972; 1976; 1980; 1984; 1988; 1992; 1996; 2000; 2004; 2008; 2012; 2016; 2020; 2024; 2028

Argentina competed at the 2004 Summer Olympics in Athens, Greece, from 13 to 29 August 2004. This was the nation's twenty-first appearance at the Olympic Games, except for three different editions. Argentina did not attend the 1904 Summer Olympics in St. Louis, the 1912 Summer Olympics in Stockholm, and the 1980 Summer Olympics in Moscow, because of its support for the United States-led boycott. The sailor Carlos Espínola was the nation's flag bearer at the opening ceremony. 152 competitors, 106 men and 46 women, took part in 86 events in 22 sports.

The total medal count of six, marked the best performance by Argentina since the 1948 Summer Olympics, earning their first gold medals since the 1952 Summer Olympics and their best position in the medal table up to that point, at 35th place overall.

== Medalists ==
Medal	Name	Sport	Event	Date
Gold	Argentina national basketball team: Carlos Delfino; Gabriel Fernández; Emanuel Ginóbili; Leonardo Gutiérrez; Walter Herrmann; Alejandro Montecchia; Andrés Nocioni; Fabricio Oberto; Juan Ignacio Sánchez; Luis Scola; Hugo Sconochini; Rubén Wolkowyski	Basketball	Men's tournament	August 28
Gold	Argentina national football team: Roberto Ayala; Nicolás Burdisso; Wilfredo Caballero; Fabricio Coloccini; César Delgado; Andrés D'Alessandro; Leandro Fernández; Luciano Figueroa; Cristian González; Luis González; Mariano González; Gabriel Heinze; Germán Lux; Javier Mascherano; Nicolás Medina; Clemente Rodríguez; Mauro Rosales; Javier Saviola; Carlos Tevez	Football	Men's tournament	August 28
Bronze	Georgina Bardach	Swimming	Women's 400 m individual medley	August 14
Bronze	Paola Suárez; Patricia Tarabini	Tennis	Women's doubles	August 21
Bronze	Argentina national field hockey team: Magdalena Aicega; Mariela Antoniska; Inés Arrondo; Luciana Aymar; Claudia Burkart; Marina di Giacomo; Soledad García; Mariana González Oliva; Alejandra Gulla; María de la Paz Hernández; Mercedes Margalot; Vanina Oneto; Cecilia Rognoni; Mariné Russo; Ayelén Stepnik; Paola Vukojicic	Field hockey	Women's tournament	August 26
Bronze	Carlos Espínola; Santiago Lange	Sailing	Men's Tornado	August 28

== Athletics ==
Argentine athletes achieved qualifying standards in the following athletics events (up to a maximum of 3 athletes in each event at the 'A' Standard, and 1 at the 'B' Standard):

Key

- Note–Ranks given for track events are within the athlete's heat only
- Q = Qualified for the next round
- q = Qualified for the next round as a fastest loser or, in field events, by position without achieving the qualifying target
- NR = National record
- N/A = Round not applicable for the event
- Bye = Athlete not required to compete in round
- NM = No mark

Men
Field events

Athlete	Event	Qualification		Final	
Athlete	Event	Distance	Position	Distance	Position
Juan Ignacio Cerra	Hammer throw	72.53	26	Did not advance	
Marcelo Pugliese	Discus throw	56.06	31	Did not advance	

Combined events – Decathlon

Athlete	Event	100 m	LJ	SP	HJ	400 m	110H	DT	PV	JT	1500 m	Final	Rank
Santiago Lorenzo	Result	11.10	7.03	13.22	1.85	49.34	15.38	40.22	4.50	58.36	4:23.08	7592	24
Santiago Lorenzo	Points	838	821	681	670	845	804	669	760	713	791	7592	24

Women
Track & road events

Athlete	Event	Final	
Athlete	Event	Result	Rank
Sandra Torres	Marathon	2:54:48	55

Field events

Athlete	Event	Qualification		Final	
Athlete	Event	Distance	Position	Distance	Position
Jennifer Dahlgren	Hammer throw	59.52	43	Did not advance	
Alejandra García	Pole vault	4.40	12 q	4.20	=13
Romina Maggi	Javelin throw	48.58	43	Did not advance	
Solange Witteveen	High jump	1.89	23	Did not advance	

== Basketball ==
Argentina qualified a men's team.

- Men's team event – 1 team of 12 players

=== Men's tournament ===
Roster

The following is the Argentina roster in the men's basketball tournament of the 2004 Summer Olympics.

Argentina men's national basketball team – 2004 Summer Olympics roster
Players
Coaches

Pos.	No.	Name	Age – Date of birth	Height	Club	Ctr.
PG	4	Juan Ignacio Sánchez	27 – 8 April 1977	1.93 m (6 ft 4 in)	Etosa Alicante	(Spain)
SG	5	Manu Ginóbili	27 – 28 July 1977	1.98 m (6 ft 6 in)	San Antonio Spurs	(United States)
PG	6	Alejandro Montecchia	32 – 1 January 1972	1.82 m (6 ft 0 in)	Pamesa Valencia	(Spain)
C	7	Fabricio Oberto	29 – 21 March 1975	2.08 m (6 ft 10 in)	Pamesa Valencia	(Spain)
SF	8	Walter Herrmann	25 – 26 June 1979	2.03 m (6 ft 8 in)	Unicaja Málaga	(Spain)
C	9	Gabriel Fernández	27 – 23 October 1976	2.04 m (6 ft 8 in)	Fórum Valladolid	(Spain)
SG	10	Hugo Sconochini (C)	33 – 10 April 1971	1.92 m (6 ft 4 in)	Olimpia Milano	(Italy)
PF	11	Luis Scola	24 – 30 April 1980	2.06 m (6 ft 9 in)	Tau Cerámica	(Spain)
PF	12	Leonardo Gutiérrez	26 – 16 May 1978	2.00 m (6 ft 7 in)	Obras Sanitarias	(Argentina)
SF	13	Andrés Nocioni	24 – 30 November 1979	2.01 m (6 ft 7 in)	Tau Cerámica	(Spain)
SF	14	Carlos Delfino	21 – 29 August 1982	1.98 m (6 ft 6 in)	Skipper Bologna	(Italy)
C	15	Rubén Wolkowyski	30 – 30 September 1973	2.08 m (6 ft 10 in)	Olympiacos B.C.	(Greece)

Head coach

- (Argentina) Rubén Magnano

Legend

- (C) Team captain
- nat field describes country
  of last club
  before the tournament
- Age as of August 13, 2004

Group play

Pos	Team	Pld	W	L	PF	PA	PD	Pts	Qualification
1	Spain	5	5	0	405	349	+56	10	Quarterfinals
2	Italy	5	3	2	371	341	+30	8 (Note: Head-to-head record: Italy 1–0 Argentina)	Quarterfinals
3	Argentina	5	3	2	414	396	+18	8	Quarterfinals
4	China	5	2	3	303	382	−79	7	Quarterfinals
5	New Zealand	5	1	4	399	413	−14	6 (Note: Head-to-head record: New Zealand 1–0 Serbia and Montenegro)	9th place playoff
6	Serbia and Montenegro	5	1	4	377	388	−11	6	11th place playoff

Source: FIBA archive
Rules for classification: 1) points; 2) head-to-head points; 3) head-to-head goal average; 4) head-to-head number of points scored.
Notes:

15 August 2004
16:45

Argentina	83–82	Serbia and Montenegro
Scoring by quarter: 27–15, 22–24, 12–20, 22–23
Pts: Ginóbili 27; Rebs: Wolkowyski 6 Asts: Ginóbili 3		Pts: Radmanović 21; Rebs: Dejan Tomašević 10; Asts: 3 players, 1 each

Olympic Indoor Hall, Athens
Attendance: 10,500
Referees: Virginijus Dovidavicius (LTU), José Carrión (PUR)

17 August 2004
20:00

Spain	87–76	Argentina
Scoring by quarter: 25–18, 10–22, 23–20, 29–16
Pts: Gasol 26; Rebs: Gasol 8 Asts: Calderón 5		Pts: Scola 28; Rebs: Scola 9 Asts: 3 players, 4 each

Helliniko Indoor Arena, Athens
Attendance: 12,000
Referees: Lazaros Voreadis (GRE), Mike Homsy (CAN)

19 August 2004
20:00

Argentina	82–57	China
Scoring by quarter: 22–14, 19–7, 24–18, 17–18
Pts: Nocioni 17; Rebs: Delfino, Nocioni 6 each Asts: Scola, Sconochini 4 each		Pts: Yao Ming 15; Rebs: Yao Ming 7 Asts: Liu Wei 2

Helliniko Indoor Arena, Athens
Attendance: 12,000
Referees: Sean Corbin (USA), Scott Buttler (AUS)

21 August 2004
14:30

New Zealand	94–98	Argentina
Scoring by quarter: 25–23, 17–24, 29–29, 23–22
Pts: Jones 25; Rebs: Book 6 Asts: Dickel 7		Pts: Scola 25; Rebs: Oberto 9 Asts: Montecchia, Oberto 5 each

Helliniko Indoor Arena, Athens
Attendance: 8,000
Referees: Virginijus Dovidavicius (LTU), Christos Christodoulou (GRE)

23 August 2004
20:00

Italy	76–75	Argentina
Scoring by quarter: 13–23, 22–13, 18–18, 23–21
Pts: Pozzecco 17; Rebs: Bulleri 6 Asts: Bulleri 4		Pts: Ginóbili, Scola 19 each Rebs: Wolkowyski 7 Asts: Ginóbili 3

Helliniko Indoor Arena, Athens
Attendance: 12,000
Referees: Lazaros Voreadis (GRE), Sean Corbin (USA)

Quarterfinals

26 August 2004
22:15

Greece	64–69	Argentina
Scoring by quarter: 14–22, 21–7, 18–24, 11–16
Pts: Hatzivrettas 12; Rebs: Dikoudis, Papadopoulos 9 each Asts: Diamantidis 3		Pts: Ginóbili, Oberto 13 each Rebs: Herrmann 6 Asts: Ginóbili, Montecchia 2 each

Olympic Indoor Hall, Athens
Attendance: 14,500
Referees: Renato Santos (BRA), Giampaolo Cicoria (ITA)

Semifinals

27 August 2004
20:00

Argentina	89–81	United States
Scoring by quarter: 24–20, 19–18, 27–19, 19–24
Pts: Ginóbili 29; Rebs: Oberto 6 Asts: Sánchez 7		Pts: Marbury 18; Rebs: Boozer 9 Asts: Iverson, Odom 3 each

Olympic Indoor Hall, Athens
Attendance: 14,500
Referees: Vicente Bulto (ESP), Zoran Šutulović (SCG)

Gold medal game

28 August 2004
22:45

Italy	69–84	Argentina
Scoring by quarter: 16–23, 25–20, 13–17, 15–24
Pts: Pozzecco, Soragna 12 each Rebs: Garri 6 Asts: Rombaldoni 2		Pts: Scola 25; Rebs: Scola 11; Asts: Ginóbili 6

Olympic Indoor Hall, Athens
Attendance: 14,500
Referees: Renato Santos (BRA), Lazaros Voreadis (GRE)

Won gold medal

== Boxing ==
Athlete	Event	Round of 32	Round of 16	Quarterfinals	Semifinals	Final	
Athlete	Event	Opposition Result	Opposition Result	Opposition Result	Opposition Result	Opposition Result	Rank
Daniel Brizuela	Featherweight	Tajbert (GER); L RSC	Did not advance				

== Canoeing ==
Two competitors joined Argentina for the canoeing flatwater event only.

=== Sprint ===
Argentina qualified boats for the following events.

Athlete	Event	Heats		Semifinals		Final	
Athlete	Event	Time	Rank	Time	Rank	Time	Rank
Javier Correa	Men's K-1 500 m	1:38.675	2 q	1:39.525	2 Q	1:40.639	8
Javier Correa	Men's K-1 1000 m	3:28.492	4 q	3:31.934	4	Did not advance	
Fernanda Lauro	Women's K-1 500 m	1:59.474	6 q	2:00.198	9	Did not advance	

Qualification Legend: Q = Qualify to final; q = Qualify to semifinal

== Cycling ==
=== Track ===
Omnium

Athlete	Event	Points	Laps	Rank
Juan Curuchet	Men's points race	23	−3	13
Juan Curuchet; Walter Pérez	Men's madison	5	−1	9

=== Mountain biking ===
Athlete	Event	Time	Rank
Carlos Franco Gennero	Men's cross-country	LAP (3 laps)	44
Jimena Florit	Women's cross-country	2:08:42	12

== Equestrian ==
=== Jumping ===
Athlete	Horse	Event	Qualification								Final					Total	
Athlete	Horse	Event	Round 1		Round 2			Round 3			Round A		Round B			Total	
Athlete	Horse	Event	Penalties	Rank	Penalties	Total	Rank	Penalties	Total	Rank	Penalties	Rank	Penalties	Total	Rank	Penalties	Rank
Martín Dopazo	Furka du Village	Individual	8	=47	8	16	=40	8	24	=37 Q	8	=12	17	25	=23	25	=23
Federico Sztyrle	Who Knows Lilly	Individual	5	=31	Retired			Did not advance									
Gregorio Werthein	Calwaro	Individual	DNF		Did not advance												
Lucas Werthein	Warren	Individual	9	=54 Q	DNF			Did not advance									
Martín Dopazo; Federico Sztyrle; Gregorio Werthein; Lucas Werthein	See above	Team	—N/a								22	=15	Did not advance			22	=15

== Fencing ==
Argentina qualified 1 fencer.

Women

Athlete	Event	Round of 32	Round of 16	Quarterfinal	Semifinal	Final / BM	
Athlete	Event	Opposition Score	Opposition Score	Opposition Score	Opposition Score	Opposition Score	Rank
Alejandra Carbone	Individual foil	Bye	Sugawara (JPN); L 6–15	Did not advance			

== Field hockey ==
=== Men's tournament ===
Roster

The following is the Argentine roster in the men's field hockey tournament of the 2004 Summer Olympics.

Head coach: Jorge Ruiz

1. Pablo Moreira (GK)
2. Juan Pablo Hourquebie
3. Maximiliano Caldas
4. Matias Vila
5. Ezequiel Paulón
7. Mario Almada
8. Carlos Retegui
9. Rodrigo Vila
10. Tomás MacCormik
13. Jorge Lombi
14. Fernando Zylberberg
15. Germán Orozco
17. Matias Paredes
19. Juan Manuel Vivaldi
22. Lucas Rey
23. Lucas Cammareri

Group play

Pos	Team	Pld	W	D	L	GF	GA	GD	Pts	Qualification
1	Netherlands	5	5	0	0	16	9	+7	15	Semi-finals
2	Australia	5	3	1	1	14	10	+4	10	Semi-finals
3	New Zealand	5	3	0	2	13	11	+2	9	5–8th place semi-finals
4	India	5	1	1	3	11	13	−2	4	5–8th place semi-finals
5	South Africa	5	1	0	4	9	15	−6	3	9–12th place semi-finals
6	Argentina	5	0	2	3	8	13	−5	2	9–12th place semi-finals

Source: FIH

15 August
10:30

Argentina	1 – 2	South Africa
Almada 10'		Nicol 38', 40'

Umpires:
Xavier Adell Salvatella (ESP)
David Gentles (AUS)

17 August
10:30

Argentina	2 – 2	Australia
Almada 2', 31'		Dwyer 26', 66'

Umpires:
Christian Blasch (GER)
Jason McCracken (NZL)

19 August
20:00

New Zealand	3 – 1	Argentina
Shaw 12'; Hari 44'; Burrows 49'		Lombi 8'

Umpires:
David Leiper (GBR)
Pedro Teixeira (POR)

21 August
18:30

Argentina	2 – 4	Netherlands
Almada 37'; Lombi 52'		Reckers 17'; Klaver 22'; Taekema 26' de Nooijer 44'

Umpires:
Singh Amarjit (MAS)
Murray Grime (AUS)

23 August
20:00

India	2 – 2	Argentina
G. Singh 33', 60'		M. Vila 52'

Umpires:
David Gentles (AUS)
Peter Elders (NED)

9th to 12th place classification

25 August
11:00

Great Britain	4 – 1	Argentina
Moore 24'; Bertram 35+'; Hall 38'; Pearn 67'		Retegui 64'

Umpires:
Jason McCracken (NZL)
Christian Blasch (GER)

11th place match

27 August
09:00

Egypt	2 – 4	Argentina
El Sayed 21'; S. Mohamed 43'		Retegui 20'; Almada 26', 48', 62'

Umpires:
Xavier Adell (ESP)
Jin Soo Han (KOR)

=== Women's tournament ===
Roster

The following is the Argentine roster in the women's field hockey tournament of the 2004 Summer Olympics.

Head coach: Sergio Vigil

1. Mariela Antoniska (GK)
3. Magdalena Aicega (c)
5. Marina di Giacomo
6. Ayelén Stepnik
7. Alejandra Gulla
8. Luciana Aymar
9. Vanina Oneto
10. Soledad García
12. Mariana González Oliva
14. Mercedes Margalot
15. María de la Paz Hernández
16. Cecilia Rognoni
18. Paola Vukojicic (GK)
19. Mariné Russo
21. Inés Arrondo
24. Claudia Burkart

Group play

Pos	Team	Pld	W	D	L	GF	GA	GD	Pts	Qualification
1	China	4	4	0	0	11	2	+9	12	Semi-finals
2	Argentina	4	3	0	1	12	4	+8	9	Semi-finals
3	Japan	4	2	0	2	5	7	−2	6	
4	New Zealand	4	1	0	3	3	9	−6	3	
5	Spain	4	0	0	4	3	12	−9	0	

Source: FIH
Rules for classification: 1) Points; 2) Matches won; 3) Goal difference; 4) Goals for; 5) Head-to-head result.

14 August
20:00

Argentina	4 – 0	Spain
Stepnik 11'; Rognoni 25'; García 28'; Oneto 69'

Umpires:
Julie Ashton-Lucy (USA)
Ute Conen (GER)

16 August
08:30

Japan	1 – 3	Argentina
Komazawa 27'		Arrondo 19'; García 37' di Giacomo 58'

Umpires:
Minka Woolley (AUS)
Lyn Farrell (NZL)

20 August
10:30

New Zealand	0 – 3	Argentina
		Aymar 8'; Oneto 38'; García 53'

Umpires:
Chieko Akiyama (JPN)
Julie Ashton-Lucy (USA)

22 August
18:00

China	2 – 3	Argentina
Ma 9'; Fu 16'; Tang 47'		Aymar 8', 34'

Umpires:
Sheila Brown (RSA)
Phillipa March (AUS)

Semifinals

24 August
18:00

Netherlands	2 – 2 (a.e.t.)	Argentina
Sylvia Karres 41'; Donners 45'		García 17'; Aicega 68'
Penalties
Schopman (penalty shoot-out scored); Boomgaardt (penalty shoot-out scored); Donners (penalty shoot-out scored) van Kessel (penalty shoot-out scored)	4 – 2	(penalty shoot-out scored) Margalot; (penalty shoot-out missed) Rognoni; (penalty shoot-out scored) Aymar; (penalty shoot-out missed) Stepnik

Umpires:
Lyn Farrell (NZL)
Minka Woolley (AUS)

Bronze Medal match

26 August
18:00

Argentina	1 – 0	China
Aymar 80'

Umpires:
Renee Cohen (NED)
Ute Conen (GER)

Won Bronze Medal

== Football ==
=== Men's tournament ===
Roster

The following is the Argentine squad in the men's football tournament of the 2004 Summer Olympics.

Head coach: Marcelo Bielsa

No.	Pos.	Player	Date of birth (age)	Caps	Goals	2004 club
1	GK	Willy Caballero	28 September 1981 (aged 22)	8	0	(Argentine Football Association) Boca Juniors
2	DF	Roberto Ayala*	14 April 1973 (aged 31)	90	5	(Royal Spanish Football Federation) Valencia
3	DF	Nicolás Burdisso	12 April 1981 (aged 23)	10	0	(Italian Football Federation) Inter Milan
4	DF	Fabricio Coloccini	22 January 1982 (aged 22)	7	0	(Italian Football Federation) Milan
5	MF	Javier Mascherano	8 June 1984 (aged 20)	13	0	(Argentine Football Association) River Plate
6	DF	Gabriel Heinze*	19 April 1978 (aged 26)	13	0	(The Football Association) Manchester United
7	FW	Javier Saviola	11 December 1981 (aged 22)	18	4	(Royal Spanish Football Federation) Barcelona
8	FW	César Delgado	18 August 1981 (aged 22)	19	2	(Mexican Football Federation) Cruz Azul
9	FW	Luciano Figueroa	19 May 1981 (aged 23)	10	5	(Mexican Football Federation) Cruz Azul
10	FW	Carlos Tevez	5 February 1984 (aged 20)	13	2	(Argentine Football Association) Boca Juniors
11	MF	Kily González*	4 August 1974 (aged 30)	55	8	(Italian Football Federation) Inter Milan
12	FW	Mauro Rosales	24 February 1981 (aged 23)	14	0	(Argentine Football Association) Newell's Old Boys
13	MF	Nicolás Medina	17 February 1982 (aged 22)	5	0	(The Football Association) Sunderland
14	DF	Clemente Rodríguez	31 July 1981 (aged 23)	13	0	(Russian Football Union) Spartak Moscow
15	MF	Andrés D'Alessandro	15 April 1981 (aged 23)	16	3	(German Football Association) Wolfsburg
16	MF	Lucho González	19 January 1981 (aged 23)	20	4	(Argentine Football Association) River Plate
17	FW	Mariano González	5 May 1981 (aged 23)	17	1	(Italian Football Federation) Palermo
18	GK	Germán Lux	7 June 1982 (aged 22)	0	0	(Argentine Football Association) River Plate
21	DF	Leandro Fernández (Note: Replaces Nicolás Burdisso who was injured during the competition)	30 January 1983 (aged 21)	0	0	(Argentine Football Association) Newell's Old Boys

* Over-aged player.

Notes

Group play

Pos	Team	Pld	W	D	L	GF	GA	GD	Pts	Qualification
1	Argentina	3	3	0	0	9	0	+9	9	Qualified for the quarterfinals
2	Australia	3	1	1	1	6	3	+3	4	Qualified for the quarterfinals
3	Tunisia	3	1	1	1	4	5	−1	4	
4	Serbia and Montenegro	3	0	0	3	3	14	−11	0	

August 11, 2004
20:30

Argentina	6–0	Serbia and Montenegro
Delgado 11'; C. González 17'; Tevez 42', 43'; Heinze 74'; Rosales 77'	(Report)

Pampeloponnisiako Stadium, Patras
Attendance: 14,675
Referee: Carlos Batres (Guatemala)

August 14, 2004
20:30

Argentina	2–0	Tunisia
Tevez 39'; Saviola 72'	(Report)

Pampeloponnisiako Stadium, Patras
Attendance: 5,112
Referee: Éric Poulat (France)

August 17, 2004
20:30

Argentina	1–0	Australia
D'Alessandro 9'	(Report)

Karaiskakis Stadium, Athens
Attendance: 26,338
Referee: Essam Abd El Fatah (Egypt)

Quarterfinals

August 21, 2004
21:00

Argentina	4–0	Costa Rica
Delgado 24'; Tevez 43', 82', 83'	(Report)

Pampeloponnisiako Stadium, Patras
Attendance: 9,292
Referee: Kyros Vassaras (Greece)

Semifinals

August 24, 2004
18:00

Italy	0–3	Argentina
	(Report)	Tevez 16'; L. González 69'; M. González 84'

Karaiskakis Stadium, Athens
Attendance: 30,910
Referee: Benito Archundia (Mexico)

Gold Medal match

August 28, 2004
18:00

Argentina	1–0	Paraguay
Tevez 16'	(Report)

Olympic Stadium, Athens
Attendance: 41,116
Referee: Kyros Vassaras (Greece)

Won Gold Medal

== Gymnastics ==
Argentina had one woman competing in artistic gymnastics as an individual.

=== Artistic ===
Women

Athlete	Event	Qualification						Final					
Athlete	Event	Apparatus				Total	Rank	Apparatus				Total	Rank
Athlete	Event	V	UB	BB	F	Total	Rank	V	UB	BB	F	Total	Rank
Celeste Carnavale	All-around	9.050	8.325	8.525	8.362	34.262	56	Did not advance					

== Judo ==
Argentina qualified nine judoka.

Men

Athlete	Event	Round of 32	Round of 16	Quarterfinals	Semifinals	Repechage 1	Repechage 2	Repechage 3	Final / BM	
Athlete	Event	Opposition Result	Opposition Result	Opposition Result	Opposition Result	Opposition Result	Opposition Result	Opposition Result	Opposition Result	Rank
Miguel Albarracín	−60 kg	Labrosse (SEY); W 1001–0001	Aburto (MEX); W 1000–0002	Nomura (JPN); L 0000–0001	Did not advance	Bye	Gussenberg (GER); L 0000–0012	Did not advance		
Jorge Lencina	−66 kg	Uchishiba (JPN); L 0000–1011	Did not advance			Dashdavaa (MGL); W 1011–0001	Dzhafarov (RUS); W 1001–0001	Margoshvili (GEO); L 0000–1000	Did not advance	
Rodrigo Lucenti	−73 kg	Pedro (USA); L 0000–1001	Did not advance							
Ariel Sganga	−81 kg	Aschwanden (SUI); W 1000–0002	Iliadis (GRE); L WO	Did not advance		Endicott-Davies (AUS); L 0000–1000	Did not advance			
Eduardo Costa	−90 kg	Camacho (VEN); W 1101–0000	Grekov (UKR); W 0112–0001	Izumi (JPN); L 0000–0001	Did not advance	Bye	Kukharenka (BLR); W 1000–0100	Huizinga (NED); L 0000–1010	Did not advance	
Andrés Loforte	−100 kg	El Gharbawy (EGY); L 0001–0002	Did not advance							
Orlando Baccino	+100 kg	Rybak (BLR); L 0000–1001	Did not advance							

Women

Athlete	Event	Round of 32	Round of 16	Quarterfinals	Semifinals	Repechage 1	Repechage 2	Repechage 3	Final / BM	
Athlete	Event	Opposition Result	Opposition Result	Opposition Result	Opposition Result	Opposition Result	Opposition Result	Opposition Result	Opposition Result	Rank
Daniela Krukower	−63 kg	Bye	Lee B-H (KOR); W 0001–0000	Décosse (FRA); W 0001–0000	Tanimoto (JPN); L 0000–1000	Bye			González (CUB); L WO	5
Elizabeth Copes	−70 kg	Bye	Kourtelesi (GRE); W 1021–0000	Bosch (NED); L 0000–1000	Did not advance	Bye	Blanco (ESP); L 0000–1011	Did not advance		

== Rowing ==
Men

Athlete	Event	Heats		Repechage		Semifinals		Final	
Athlete	Event	Time	Rank	Time	Rank	Time	Rank	Time	Rank
Santiago Fernández	Single sculls	7:22.52	1 SA/B/C	Bye		7:00.90	2 FA	6:55.17	4
Marcos Morales; Walter Naneder	Pair	7:02.29	4 R	6:28.98	2 SA/B	7:19.57	6 FB	6:27.88	10

Women

Athlete	Event	Heats		Repechage		Semifinals		Final	
Athlete	Event	Time	Rank	Time	Rank	Time	Rank	Time	Rank
Analía Marín	Single sculls	8:01.56	4 R	7:51.94	4 SC/D	7:58.07	3 FC	DNF	18
Milka Kraljev; Lucía Palermo	Lightweight double sculls	7:25.11	6 R	7:23.22	5 FC	Bye		7:54.32	17

Qualification Legend: FA=Final A (medal); FB=Final B (non-medal); FC=Final C (non-medal); FD=Final D (non-medal); FE=Final E (non-medal); FF=Final F (non-medal); SA/B=Semifinals A/B; SC/D=Semifinals C/D; SE/F=Semifinals E/F; R=Repechage

== Sailing ==
Men

Athlete	Event	Race											Net points	Final rank
Athlete	Event	1	2	3	4	5	6	7	8	9	10	M*	Net points	Final rank
Mariano Reutemann	Mistral	~~29~~	5	24	7	23	23	15	13	11	10	9	140	15
Alejandro Colla	Finn	20	21	~~25~~	18	5	20	14	20	21	19	16	174	22
Javier Conte; Juan de la Fuente	470	~~26~~	20	5	1	21	1	11	13	9	23	17	121	13

Women

Athlete	Event	Race											Net points	Final rank
Athlete	Event	1	2	3	4	5	6	7	8	9	10	M*	Net points	Final rank
Catalina Walther	Mistral	19	23	21	19	19	20	21	23	23	20	~~OCS~~	208	22
Serena Amato	Europe	5	2	~~22~~	8	13	22	2	11	4	10	9	86	6
Paula Reinoso; Maria Fernanda Sesto	470	15	7	11	6	15	~~16~~	3	14	9	11	11	102	12

Open

Athlete	Event	Race											Net points	Final rank
Athlete	Event	1	2	3	4	5	6	7	8	9	10	M*	Net points	Final rank
Diego Romero	Laser	40	6	11	2	18	~~43~~	23	5	5	12	12	134	12
Carlos Espínola; Santiago Lange	Tornado	7	1	6	5	6	~~11~~	5	8	4	3	9	54	3rd place, bronze medalist(s)

M = Medal race; OCS = On course side of the starting line; DSQ = Disqualified; DNF = Did not finish; DNS= Did not start; RDG = Redress given

== Shooting ==
Men

Athlete	Event	Qualification		Final	
Athlete	Event	Points	Rank	Points	Rank
Pablo Álvarez	10 m air rifle	583	43	Did not advance	
Pablo Álvarez	50 m rifle prone	587	=40	Did not advance	
Pablo Álvarez	50 m rifle 3 positions	1135	=38	Did not advance	
Maximo Modesti	10 m air pistol	559	44	Did not advance	
Maximo Modesti	50 m pistol	548	=30	Did not advance	
Ángel Velarte	10 m air rifle	586	=39	Did not advance	
Ángel Velarte	50 m rifle prone	584	45	Did not advance	
Ángel Velarte	50 m rifle 3 positions	1137	=36	Did not advance	

== Swimming ==
Argentine swimmers earned qualifying standards in the following events (up to a maximum of 2 swimmers in each event at the A-standard time, and 1 at the B-standard time):

Men

Athlete	Event	Heat		Semifinal		Final	
Athlete	Event	Time	Rank	Time	Rank	Time	Rank
José Meolans	50 m freestyle	22.90	27	Did not advance			
José Meolans	100 m freestyle	49.98	24	Did not advance			
Eduardo Germán Otero	100 m backstroke	57.28	33	Did not advance			
Eduardo Germán Otero	100 m butterfly	55.24	44	Did not advance			
Juan Martín Pereyra	200 m freestyle	1:53.19	=40	Did not advance			
Juan Martín Pereyra	400 m freestyle	3:57.26	27	—N/a		Did not advance	
Juan Martín Pereyra	1500 m freestyle	15:53.29	26	—N/a		Did not advance	
Gastón Rodríguez	200 m butterfly	2:04.01	29	Did not advance			
Cristian Mauro Soldano	100 m breaststroke	1:05.05	43	Did not advance			

Women

Athlete	Event	Heat		Semifinal		Final	
Athlete	Event	Time	Rank	Time	Rank	Time	Rank
Georgina Bardach	200 m butterfly	2:13.68	21	Did not advance			
Georgina Bardach	200 m individual medley	2:16.68	14 Q	2:15.73	13	Did not advance	
Georgina Bardach	400 m individual medley	4:41.20	3 Q	—N/a		4:37.51 NR	3rd place, bronze medalist(s)
Cecilia Biagioli	400 m freestyle	4:16.42	22	—N/a		Did not advance	
Agustina de Giovanni	200 m breaststroke	2:35.94	26	Did not advance			
Javiera Salcedo	100 m breaststroke	1:12.46	=29	Did not advance			
Florencia Szigeti	50 m freestyle	26.84	37	Did not advance			
Florencia Szigeti	100 m freestyle	56.71	28	Did not advance			
Florencia Szigeti	200 m freestyle	2:03.29	25	Did not advance			

== Table tennis ==
Athlete	Event	Round 1	Round 2	Round 3	Round 4	Quarterfinals	Semifinals	Final / BM	
Athlete	Event	Opposition Result	Opposition Result	Opposition Result	Opposition Result	Opposition Result	Opposition Result	Opposition Result	Rank
Liu Song	Men's singles	Arai (JPN); W 4–1	Grujić (SCG); W 4–1	Joo S-H (KOR); L 0–4	Did not advance				
Pablo Tabachnik	Men's singles	Toriola (NGR); L 1–4	Did not advance						
Oscar Gonzales; Pablo Tabachnik	Men's doubles	—N/a	Gionis / Kreanga (GRE); L 1–4	Did not advance					

== Taekwondo ==
Athlete	Event	Round of 16	Quarterfinals	Semifinals	Repechage 1	Repechage 2	Final / BM	
Athlete	Event	Opposition Result	Opposition Result	Opposition Result	Opposition Result	Opposition Result	Opposition Result	Rank
Alejandro Hernando	Men's −68 kg	Roesen (DEN); L 10–11	Did not advance					
Vanina Sánchez	Women's −67 kg	Rivero (PHI); L 10–10 SUP	Did not advance					

== Tennis ==
Men

Athlete	Event	Round of 64	Round of 32	Round of 16	Quarterfinals	Semifinals	Final / BM	
Athlete	Event	Opposition Score	Opposition Score	Opposition Score	Opposition Score	Opposition Score	Opposition Score	Rank
Agustín Calleri	Singles	Beck (SVK); W 2–6, 6–3, 8–6	Andreev (RUS); L RET	Did not advance				
Juan Ignacio Chela	Singles	Mirnyi (BLR); L 6–3, 7–6^{(7–0)}, 4–6	Did not advance					
David Nalbandian	Singles	Withdrew on 15 August due to strained left thigh injury						
Mariano Zabaleta	Singles	Lee H-T (KOR); L 6–4, 3–6, 2–6	Did not advance					
Juan Ignacio Chela; Mariano Zabaleta	Doubles	—N/a	Andreev / Davydenko (RUS); L 6–3, 3–6, 4–6	Did not advance				
Gastón Etlis; Martín Rodríguez	Doubles	—N/a	López / Robredo (ESP); W 6–3, 6–4	González / Massú (CHI); L 3–6, 6–7^{(2–7)}	Did not advance			

Women

Athlete	Event	Round of 64	Round of 32	Round of 16	Quarterfinals	Semifinals	Final / BM	
Athlete	Event	Opposition Score	Opposition Score	Opposition Score	Opposition Score	Opposition Score	Opposition Score	Rank
Mariana Díaz Oliva	Singles	Kuznetsova (RUS); L 3–6, 3–6	Did not advance					
Gisela Dulko	Singles	Šprem (CRO); L 6–7^{(6–8)}, 5–7	Did not advance					
Paola Suárez	Singles	Dechy (FRA); W 6–7^{(1–7)}, 7–6^{(7–5)}, 9–7	Zuluaga (COL); L 6–4, 6–7^{(1–7)}, 1–6	Did not advance				
Paola Suárez; Patricia Tarabini	Doubles	—N/a	Medina Garrigues/ Sánchez Vicario (ESP); W 6–7^{(8–10)}, 7–5, 6–2	Morigami / Obata (JPN); W 6–4, 6–2	Dechy / Testud (FRA); W 6–4, 1–6, 6–4	Li T / Sun Tt (CHN); L 2–6, 6–2, 7–9	Asagoe / Sugiyama (JPN); W 6–3, 6–3	3rd place, bronze medalist(s)

== Triathlon ==
Athlete	Event	Swim (1.5 km)	Trans 1	Bike (40 km)	Trans 2	Run (10 km)	Total Time	Rank
Daniel Fontana	Men's	18:25	0:19	1:05:11	0:20	32:59	1:57:14.20	28
Nancy Álvarez	Women's	20:58	0:21	1:17:29	0:25	42:23	2:21:38.66	43

== Volleyball ==
=== Beach ===
Athlete	Event	Preliminary round	Standing	Round of 16	Quarterfinals	Semifinals	Final	
Athlete	Event	Opposition Score	Standing	Opposition Score	Opposition Score	Opposition Score	Opposition Score	Rank
Mariano Baracetti; Martín Conde	Men's	Pool F Brenha – Maia (POR); W 2 – 1 (13–21, 21–16, 15–5); Pocock – Rorich (RSA); W 2 – 0 (21–13, 21–15); Beligratis – Michalopoulos (GRE); W WO	1 Q	Child – Heese (CAN); L 0 – 2 (17–21, 17–21)	Did not advance			

=== Indoor ===
Argentina qualified a team to the men's indoor tournament.

- Men's indoor event – 1 team of 12 players

==== Men's tournament ====
Roster

The following is the Argentine roster in the men's volleyball tournament of the 2004 Summer Olympics.

Head coach: Alberto Armoa

№	Name	Date of birth	Height	Weight	Spike	Block	2004 club
1	Marcos Milinkovic (c)	22 December 1971	2.05 m (6 ft 9 in)	100 kg (220 lb)	355 cm (140 in)	338 cm (133 in)	(Brazil) Unisul Florianopolis
2	Jorge Elgueta	21 November 1969	1.96 m (6 ft 5 in)	96 kg (212 lb)	353 cm (139 in)	333 cm (131 in)	(Spain) Espi Pòrtol
3	Gustavo Porporatto	7 May 1981	1.99 m (6 ft 6 in)	91 kg (201 lb)	353 cm (139 in)	323 cm (127 in)	(Argentina) Club Social Monteros
7	Diego Gutierrez	27 May 1976	1.86 m (6 ft 1 in)	85 kg (187 lb)	330 cm (130 in)	315 cm (124 in)	(Germany) Evivo Düren
8	Hernan Ferraro	13 May 1968	1.71 m (5 ft 7 in)	74 kg (163 lb)	300 cm (120 in)	300 cm (120 in)	(Argentina) R. P. Coronel Vidal
10	Alejandro Spajic	7 May 1976	2.04 m (6 ft 8 in)	94 kg (207 lb)	360 cm (140 in)	340 cm (130 in)	(Argentina) Club Ciudad de Bolívar
11	Jerónimo Bidegain	16 January 1977	2.00 m (6 ft 7 in)	93 kg (205 lb)	352 cm (139 in)	335 cm (132 in)	(Argentina) Club Social Monteros
12	Pablo Peralta	9 December 1979	2.04 m (6 ft 8 in)	100 kg (220 lb)	350 cm (140 in)	330 cm (130 in)	(Spain) Tenerife
13	Santiago Darraidou	24 November 1980	1.94 m (6 ft 4 in)	95 kg (209 lb)	345 cm (136 in)	335 cm (132 in)	(Greece) Orestiada
15	Leonardo Patti	6 July 1978	1.88 m (6 ft 2 in)	88 kg (194 lb)	340 cm (130 in)	320 cm (130 in)	(Argentina) Club Ciudad de Bolívar
17	Pablo Meana (L)	10 June 1975	1.87 m (6 ft 2 in)	84 kg (185 lb)	325 cm (128 in)	315 cm (124 in)	(Russia) Lokomotiv
18	Gastón Giani	26 April 1979	1.94 m (6 ft 4 in)	86 kg (190 lb)	345 cm (136 in)	330 cm (130 in)	(Spain) Tenerife

Group play

Pos	Team	Pld	W	L	Pts	SW	SL	SR	SPW	SPL	SPR	Qualification
1	Serbia and Montenegro	5	4	1	9	12	6	2.000	427	398	1.073	Quarterfinals
2	Greece	5	3	2	8	12	9	1.333	475	454	1.046	Quarterfinals
3	Argentina	5	3	2	8	12	9	1.333	471	457	1.031	Quarterfinals
4	Poland	5	3	2	8	10	9	1.111	422	419	1.007	Quarterfinals
5	France	5	2	3	7	8	10	0.800	405	394	1.028	
6	Tunisia	5	0	5	5	4	15	0.267	373	451	0.827	

Source: FIVB

August 15, 2004; 14:00	Argentina	3–0	France	Peace and Friendship Stadium; Attendance: 2,370; Referees: Wang Nin (China), Hiroyuki Ito (Japan)
August 15, 2004; 14:00	(25–15, 25–23, 25–22); Report			Peace and Friendship Stadium; Attendance: 2,370; Referees: Wang Nin (China), Hiroyuki Ito (Japan)

August 17, 2004; 9:00	Tunisia	2–3	Argentina	Peace and Friendship Stadium; Attendance: 888; Referees: Ibrahim Al Naama (Qatar), Ryszard Dietrich (Poland)
August 17, 2004; 9:00	(20–25, 25–23, 16–25, 25–22, 10–15); Report			Peace and Friendship Stadium; Attendance: 888; Referees: Ibrahim Al Naama (Qatar), Ryszard Dietrich (Poland)

August 19, 2004; 19:30	Argentina	3–1	Greece	Peace and Friendship Stadium; Attendance: 9,403; Referees: Mahmoud Abdel Magid (Egypt), Patricia Salvatore (United States)
August 19, 2004; 19:30	(16–25, 25–21, 25–22, 25–22); Report			Peace and Friendship Stadium; Attendance: 9,403; Referees: Mahmoud Abdel Magid (Egypt), Patricia Salvatore (United States)

August 21, 2004; 16:10	Argentina	1–3	Serbia and Montenegro	Peace and Friendship Stadium; Attendance: 4,826; Referees: Fernando Nava (Mexico), Wang Nin (China)
August 21, 2004; 16:10	(25–21, 17–25, 21–25, 23–25); Report			Peace and Friendship Stadium; Attendance: 4,826; Referees: Fernando Nava (Mexico), Wang Nin (China)

August 23, 2004; 16:00	Poland	3–2	Argentina	Peace and Friendship Stadium; Attendance: 6,295; Referees: Kim Kun Tae (South Korea), Hiroyuki Ito (Japan)
August 23, 2004; 16:00	(25–19, 25–22, 23–25, 22–25, 20–18); Report			Peace and Friendship Stadium; Attendance: 6,295; Referees: Kim Kun Tae (South Korea), Hiroyuki Ito (Japan)

Quarterfinal

August 25, 2004; 16:60	Argentina	1–3	Italy	Peace and Friendship Stadium; Attendance: 8,100; Referees: Hiroyuki Ito (Japan), Ibrahim Al Naama (Qatar)
August 25, 2004; 16:60	(25–22, 22–25, 24–26, 26–28); Report			Peace and Friendship Stadium; Attendance: 8,100; Referees: Hiroyuki Ito (Japan), Ibrahim Al Naama (Qatar)

== Weightlifting ==
Athlete	Event	Snatch		Clean & Jerk		Total	Rank
Athlete	Event	Result	Rank	Result	Rank	Total	Rank
Darío Lecman	Men's −94 kg	155	=18	185	16	340	17
Nora Koppel	Women's −75 kg	100	=12	137.5	=6	237.5	9

== See also ==
- Argentina at the 2003 Pan American Games
- Argentina at the 2004 Summer Paralympics
