= Swimming at the 2002 Asian Games – Women's 400 metre individual medley =

Women's 400 metre individual medley at the 2002 Asian Games
- Venue: Sajik Swimming Pool
- Date: 5 October 2002
- Competitors: 11 from 8 nations

Medalists
gold medal	Qi Hui	China
silver medal	Maiko Fujino	Japan
bronze medal	Zhou Yafei	China

The women's 400 metre individual medley swimming competition at the 2002 Asian Games in Busan was held on 5 October at the Sajik Swimming Pool.

== Schedule ==
All times are Korea Standard Time (UTC+09:00)

Date	Time	Event
Saturday, 5 October 2002	10:00	Heats
Saturday, 5 October 2002	19:00	Final

== Records ==
Prior to this competition, the existing world, Asian and Games records were as follows.

World Record	Yana Klochkova (UKR)	4:33.59	Sydney, Australia	16 September 2000
Asian Record	Chen Yan (CHN)	4:34.79	Shanghai, China	18 October 1997
Games Record	Lin Li (CHN)	4:39.88	Beijing, China	23 September 1990

== Results ==
Legend

- DNS — Did not start

=== Heats ===
Rank	Heat	Athlete	Time	Notes
1	1	Maiko Fujino (JPN)	4:48.03	
2	1	Lee Sun-a (KOR)	4:54.13	
3	2	Nam Yoo-sun (KOR)	4:56.19	
4	2	Qi Hui (CHN)	4:58.55	
5	2	Ayane Sato (JPN)	4:59.04	
6	1	Zhou Yafei (CHN)	5:01.42	
7	2	Sia Wai Yen (MAS)	5:02.92	
8	1	Chan Wing Suet (HKG)	5:04.57	
9	1	Chorkaew Choompol (THA)	5:04.95	
10	2	Jenny Guerrero (PHI)	5:12.82	
—	2	Võ Thị Thanh Vy (VIE)	DNS	

=== Final ===
Rank	Athlete	Time	Notes
1st place, gold medalist(s)	Qi Hui (CHN)	4:40.37	
2nd place, silver medalist(s)	Maiko Fujino (JPN)	4:43.49	
3rd place, bronze medalist(s)	Zhou Yafei (CHN)	4:47.09	
4	Nam Yoo-sun (KOR)	4:50.03	
5	Ayane Sato (JPN)	4:50.88	
6	Lee Sun-a (KOR)	4:55.96	
7	Sia Wai Yen (MAS)	5:06.20	
8	Chan Wing Suet (HKG)	5:06.24	
