= Swimming at the 2004 Summer Olympics – Women's 400 metre individual medley =

Women's 400 metre individual medley at the Games of the XXVIII Olympiad
- Venue: Athens Olympic Aquatic Centre
- Date: August 14, 2004 (heats & final)
- Competitors: 25 from 21 nations
- Winning time: 4:34.83

Medalists
1st place, gold medalist(s)		Yana Klochkova	Ukraine
2nd place, silver medalist(s)		Kaitlin Sandeno	United States
3rd place, bronze medalist(s)		Georgina Bardach	Argentina

The women's 400 metre individual medley event at the 2004 Olympic Games was contested at the Olympic Aquatic Centre of the Athens Olympic Sports Complex in Athens, Greece on August 14.

World record holder Yana Klochkova of Ukraine successfully defended her Olympic title in this event, outside the record time of 4:34.83. U.S. swimmer Kaitlin Sandeno, who finished behind Klochkova by 0.12 of a second, earned a silver medal, in an American record time of 4:34.95. Georgina Bardach, on the other hand, won Argentina's first Olympic bronze medal in swimming, breaking a South American record of 4:37.51. South Korea's Nam Yoo-sun and Greece's Vasiliki Angelopoulou became the first female swimmers for their respective nation to reach an Olympic final, finishing outside the medals in seventh and eighth place, respectively. Romania's Beatrice Câșlaru, who won a bronze medal in Sydney, finished only in fourteenth place on the morning's preliminary heats.

== Records ==
Prior to this competition, the existing world and Olympic records were as follows.

World record	Yana Klochkova (UKR)	4:33.59	Sydney, Australia	16 September 2000
Olympic record	Yana Klochkova (UKR)	4:33.59	Sydney, Australia	16 September 2000

== Results ==
=== Heats ===
Rank	Heat	Lane	Name	Nationality	Time	Notes
1	4	4	Yana Klochkova	Ukraine	4:38.36	Q
2	4	5	Kaitlin Sandeno	United States	4:40.21	Q
3	2	5	Georgina Bardach	Argentina	4:41.20	Q
3	3	4	Éva Risztov	Hungary	4:41.20	Q
5	2	6	Nicole Hetzer	Germany	4:41.74	Q
6	4	6	Joanna Melo	Brazil	4:42.01	Q
7	4	1	Vasiliki Angelopoulou	Greece	4:44.90	Q, NR
8	2	1	Nam Yoo-sun	South Korea	4:45.16	Q
9	2	2	Helen Norfolk	New Zealand	4:45.21	
10	4	2	Misa Amano	Japan	4:45.61	
11	3	6	Elizabeth Warden	Canada	4:46.27	
12	2	3	Lara Carroll	Australia	4:46.32	
13	3	3	Anja Klinar	Slovenia	4:46.66	
14	4	3	Beatrice Câșlaru	Romania	4:46.94	
15	4	7	Zsuzsanna Jakabos	Hungary	4:47.21	
16	3	1	Alessia Filippi	Italy	4:47.26	
17	2	4	Katie Hoff	United States	4:47.49	
18	3	7	Teresa Rohmann	Germany	4:48.51	
19	3	5	Jennifer Reilly	Australia	4:49.04	
20	4	8	Lin Man-hsu	Chinese Taipei	4:52.22	
21	2	7	Yana Martynova	Russia	4:52.96	
22	1	4	Nimitta Thaveesupsoonthorn	Thailand	5:00.06	
23	1	5	Ana Dangalakova	Bulgaria	5:01.00	
24	1	3	Sabria Dahane	Algeria	5:10.20	
	3	2	Zhang Tianyi	China	DSQ	

=== Final ===
Rank	Lane	Swimmer	Nation	Time	Notes
1st place, gold medalist(s)	4	Yana Klochkova	Ukraine	4:34.83	
2nd place, silver medalist(s)	5	Kaitlin Sandeno	United States	4:34.95	AM
3rd place, bronze medalist(s)	3	Georgina Bardach	Argentina	4:37.51	SA
4	6	Éva Risztov	Hungary	4:39.29	
5	7	Joanna Melo	Brazil	4:40.00	NR
6	2	Nicole Hetzer	Germany	4:40.20	
7	8	Nam Yoo-sun	South Korea	4:50.35	
8	1	Vasiliki Angelopoulou	Greece	4:50.85	
