= Pak Nam-chol =

Pak Nam-chol may refer to:

- Pak Nam-chol (footballer, born 1985), North Korea midfielder
- Pak Nam-chol (footballer, born 1988), North Korea defender
- Pak Nam-chol (judoka) (born 1979), North Korean judoka
