= Athina Tzavella =

Greek swimmer (born 1988)

Personal information
- Full name: Athina Tzavella
- National team: Greece
- Born: 9 January 1988 (age 38)
- Height: 1.74 m (5 ft 9 in)
- Weight: 64 kg (141 lb)

Sport
- Sport: Swimming
- Strokes: Breaststroke, medley
- Club: Panellinios G.S.
Medal record
Women's swimming
Representing Greece
European Junior Championships
Bronze medal – third place	2003 Glasgow	200 m medley

Athina Tzavella (Greek: Αθηνά Τζαβέλλα; born 9 January 1988) is a Greek former swimmer, who specialized in breaststroke and individual medley events. Tzavella won a bronze medal in the 200 m individual medley at the 2003 European Junior Swimming Championships in Glasgow, Scotland with a time of 2:16.35, 0.11 of a second behind her teammate Vasiliki Angelopoulou. Having reached a B-standard entry time by FINA, Tzavella earned a spot on the Greek team for the Olympics.

Tzavella represented the host nation Greece, as a 16-year-old, at the 2004 Summer Olympics in Athens, competing in two swimming events. In the 200 m individual medley, Tzavella challenged seven other swimmers, including U.S. swimmer and three-time Olympian Amanda Beard on the third heat of the morning's preliminaries. She finished only in seventh place for her heat and twenty-third overall by less than 0.22 of a second behind Malaysia's Siow Yi Ting with a time of 2:20.30. In her second event, 200 m breaststroke, Tzavella recorded a slowest time of 2:40.18 on the same heat, finishing thirty-first overall in the preliminaries.
