= Judo at the 2004 Summer Olympics – Men's 60 kg =

Judo competition

Men's 60 kg at the Games of the XXVIII Olympiad
- Venue: Ano Liossia Olympic Hall
- Dates: 14 August 2004
- Competitors: 33 from 33 nations
- Winning score: 0100

Medalists
1st place, gold medalist(s)		Tadahiro Nomura; Japan
2nd place, silver medalist(s)		Nestor Khergiani; Georgia
3rd place, bronze medalist(s)		Khashbaataryn Tsagaanbaatar; Mongolia
3rd place, bronze medalist(s)		Choi Min-ho; South Korea

Men's 60 kg competition in judo at the 2004 Summer Olympics was held on August 14 at the Ano Liossia Olympic Hall.

This event was the lightest of the men's judo weight classes, limiting competitors to a maximum of 60 kilograms of body mass. Like all other judo events, bouts lasted five minutes. If the bout was still tied at the end, it was extended for another five-minute, sudden-death period; if neither judoka scored during that period, the match is decided by the judges. The tournament bracket consisted of a single-elimination contest culminating in a gold medal match. There was also a repechage to determine the winners of the two bronze medals. Each judoka who had lost to a semifinalist competed in the repechage. The two judokas who lost in the semifinals faced the winner of the opposite half of the bracket's repechage in bronze medal bouts.

== Schedule ==
All times are Greece Standard Time (UTC+2)

Date	Time	Round
Saturday, 14 August 2004	10:30; 13:00; 17:00	Preliminaries; Repechage; Final

== Tournament results ==
=== Final ===
Final
1	Tadahiro Nomura (JPN)	0100
2	Nestor Khergiani (GEO)	0001

=== Mat 1 ===
Round of 64

Round of 32
Younes Ahamdi (MAR)	0000
Evgeny Stanev (RUS)	1000
Anis Lounifi (TUN)	1000
Pak Nam-chol (PRK)	0001
Nestor Khergiani (GEO)	1001
Kenji Uematsu (ESP)	0010
Bazarbek Donbay (KAZ)	1000
Omar Rebahi (ALG)	0000
Craig Fallon (GBR)	1000
Scott Fernandis (AUS)	0000
Sanjar Zokirov (UZB)	0000
Revazi Zintiridis (GRE)	0011
Masoud Haji Akhondzadeh (IRI)	0030
Jean Claude Cameroun (CMR)	0001
Armen Nazaryan (ARM)	0101
Alexandre Lee (BRA)	0001

Round of 16
Evgeny Stanev (RUS)	1001
Anis Lounifi (TUN)	0000
Nestor Khergiani (GEO)	0010
Bazarbek Donbay (KAZ)	0000
Craig Fallon (GBR)	0110
Revazi Zintiridis (GRE)	1010
Masoud Haji Akhondzadeh (IRI)	0010
Armen Nazaryan (ARM)	0001

Quarterfinals
Evgeny Stanev (RUS)	0010
Nestor Khergiani (GEO)	0120
Revazi Zintiridis (GRE)	0021
Masoud Haji Akhondzadeh (IRI)	1000

Semifinals
Nestor Khergiani (GEO)	0122
Masoud Haji Akhondzadeh (IRI)	0011

=== Mat 2 ===
Round of 64
Gal Yekutiel (ISR)	0101
Albertas Techovas (LTU)	0000

Round of 32
Khashbaataryn Tsagaanbaatar (MGL)	1000
Akram Shah (IND)	0000
Gal Yekutiel (ISR)	0000
Taraje Williams-Murray (USA)	1010
Reiver Alvarenga (VEN)	0002
Benjamin Darbelet (FRA)	0010
Choi Min-ho (KOR)	1100
Ludwig Paischer (AUT)	0001
Tadahiro Nomura (JPN)	1120
Modesto Lara (DOM)	0000
Oliver Gussenberg (GER)	1010
Siarhei Novikau (BLR)	0100
Cristobal Aburto (MEX)	0002
David Fernández (CRC)	0000
Francis Labrosse (SEY)	0000
Miguel Albarracin (ARG)	1001

Round of 16
Khashbaataryn Tsagaanbaatar (MGL)	1000
Taraje Williams-Murray (USA)	0000
Benjamin Darbelet (FRA)	0101
Choi Min-ho (KOR)	0113
Tadahiro Nomura (JPN)	1000
Oliver Gussenberg (GER)	0000
Cristobal Aburto (MEX)	0002
Miguel Albarracin (ARG)	1000

Quarterfinals
Khashbaataryn Tsagaanbaatar (MGL)	1000
Choi Min-ho (KOR)	0000
Tadahiro Nomura (JPN)	1000
Miguel Albarracin (ARG)	0000

Semifinals
Khashbaataryn Tsagaanbaatar (MGL)	0000
Tadahiro Nomura (JPN)	1000

=== Repechage ===
Those judoka eliminated in earlier rounds by the four semifinalists of the main bracket advanced to the repechage. These matches determined the two bronze medalists for the event.

First round
Bazarbek Donbay (KAZ)	0001
Kenji Uematsu (ESP)	0200
Armen Nazaryan (ARM)	0000
Jean Claude Cameroun (CMR)	1000
Taraje Williams-Murray (USA)	0000
Akram Shah (IND)	1100
Oliver Gussenberg (GER)	0012
Modesto Lara (DOM)	0000

Second round
Evgeny Stanev (RUS)	0000
Kenji Uematsu (ESP)	0001
Revazi Zintiridis (GRE)	1000
Jean Claude Cameroun (CMR)	0000
Choi Min-Ho (KOR)	1000
Akram Shah (IND)	0000
Miguel Albarracin (ARG)	0000
Oliver Gussenberg (GER)	1000

Third round
Kenji Uematsu (ESP)	1000
Revazi Zintiridis (GRE)	0100
Choi Min-Ho (KOR)	1110
Oliver Gussenberg (GER)	0000

Bronze medal finals
Khashbaataryn Tsagaanbaatar (MGL)	0010
Kenji Uematsu (ESP)	0000
Masoud Haji Akhondzadeh (IRI)	0000
Choi Min-ho (KOR)	1002
