= Swimming at the 2002 Asian Games – Women's 200 metre individual medley =

Women's 200 metre individual medley at the 2002 Asian Games
- Venue: Sajik Swimming Pool
- Date: 1 October 2002
- Competitors: 12 from 7 nations

Medalists
| gold medal | Qi Hui | China |
| silver medal | Zhou Yafei | China |
| bronze medal | Maiko Fujino | Japan |

The women's 200 metre individual medley swimming competition at the 2002 Asian Games in Busan was held on 1 October at the Sajik Swimming Pool.

== Schedule ==
All times are Korea Standard Time (UTC+09:00)

| Date | Time | Event |
|---|---|---|
| Tuesday, 1 October 2002 | 10:00 | Heats |
| Tuesday, 1 October 2002 | 19:00 | Final |

== Records ==
Prior to this competition, the existing world, Asian and Games records were as follows.

| World Record | Wu Yanyan (CHN) | 2:09.72 | Shanghai, China | 17 October 1997 |
| Asian Record | Wu Yanyan (CHN) | 2:09.72 | Shanghai, China | 17 October 1997 |
| Games Record | Lin Li (CHN) | 2:13.16 | Beijing, China | 27 September 1990 |

== Results ==
=== Heats ===
| Rank | Heat | Athlete | Time | Notes |
|---|---|---|---|---|
| 1 | 1 | Maiko Fujino (JPN) | 2:17.79 | |
| 2 | 1 | Zhou Yafei (CHN) | 2:19.29 | |
| 3 | 2 | Qi Hui (CHN) | 2:19.91 | |
| 4 | 2 | Ayane Sato (JPN) | 2:20.73 | |
| 5 | 1 | Lee Sun-a (KOR) | 2:20.81 | |
| 6 | 1 | Nam Yoo-sun (KOR) | 2:21.45 | |
| 7 | 2 | Joscelin Yeo (SIN) | 2:23.70 | |
| 8 | 2 | Sherry Tsai (HKG) | 2:24.72 | |
| 9 | 2 | Lizza Danila (PHI) | 2:25.46 | |
| 10 | 2 | Rebecca Heng (SIN) | 2:27.59 | |
| 11 | 1 | Lucia Dacanay (PHI) | 2:28.58 | |
| 12 | 1 | Nayana Shakya (NEP) | 2:58.61 | |

=== Final ===
| Rank | Athlete | Time | Notes |
|---|---|---|---|
| 1st place, gold medalist(s) | Qi Hui (CHN) | 2:13.94 | |
| 2nd place, silver medalist(s) | Zhou Yafei (CHN) | 2:14.67 | |
| 3rd place, bronze medalist(s) | Maiko Fujino (JPN) | 2:16.37 | |
| 4 | Joscelin Yeo (SIN) | 2:18.02 | |
| 5 | Nam Yoo-sun (KOR) | 2:20.67 | |
| 6 | Ayane Sato (JPN) | 2:20.69 | |
| 7 | Lee Sun-a (KOR) | 2:21.75 | |
| 8 | Sherry Tsai (HKG) | 2:24.58 | |
