= Swimming at the 2004 Summer Olympics – Women's 200 metre individual medley =

Women's 200 metre individual medley at the Games of the XXVIII Olympiad
- Venue: Athens Olympic Aquatic Centre
- Date: August 16, 2004 (heats & semifinals); August 17, 2004 (final)
- Competitors: 30 from 27 nations
- Winning time: 2:11.14

Medalists
1st place, gold medalist(s)		Yana Klochkova	Ukraine
2nd place, silver medalist(s)		Amanda Beard	United States
3rd place, bronze medalist(s)		Kirsty Coventry	Zimbabwe

The women's 200 metre individual medley event at the 2004 Olympic Games was contested at the Olympic Aquatic Centre of the Athens Olympic Sports Complex in Athens, Greece on August 16 and 17.

Ukraine's Yana Klochkova became the first woman to claim two consecutive Olympic titles in the individual medley, finishing the final race with a time of 2:11.14. American swimmer and three-time Olympian Amanda Beard took home the silver, in an American record time of 2:11.70, while Zimbabwe's Kirsty Coventry, on the other hand, broke an African record of 2:12.72 to earn the bronze medal.

== Records ==
Prior to this competition, the existing world and Olympic records were as follows.

World record	Wu Yanyan (CHN)	2:09.72	Shanghai, China	17 October 1997
Olympic record	Yana Klochkova (UKR)	2:10.68	Sydney, Australia	19 September 2000

== Results ==
=== Heats ===
Rank	Heat	Lane	Name	Nationality	Time	Notes
1	4	2	Kirsty Coventry	Zimbabwe	2:13.33	Q
2	4	4	Yana Klochkova	Ukraine	2:13.40	Q
3	4	5	Katie Hoff	United States	2:14.03	Q
4	3	4	Amanda Beard	United States	2:14.49	Q
5	2	3	Hanna Shcherba	Belarus	2:14.59	Q
6	2	6	Beatrice Câșlaru	Romania	2:14.70	Q
7	3	6	Ágnes Kovács	Hungary	2:15.17	Q
8	2	5	Zhou Yafei	China	2:15.56	Q
9	3	5	Alice Mills	Australia	2:15.62	Q
10	2	4	Teresa Rohmann	Germany	2:16.06	Q
11	4	6	Lara Carroll	Australia	2:16.17	Q
12	3	1	Joanna Melo	Brazil	2:16.21	Q
13	3	2	Oxana Verevka	Russia	2:16.63	Q
14	4	7	Georgina Bardach	Argentina	2:16.68	Q
15	4	3	Elizabeth Warden	Canada	2:17.12	Q
16	4	8	Helen Norfolk	New Zealand	2:17.27	Q
17	2	7	Misa Amano	Japan	2:17.88	
18	2	2	Alenka Kejžar	Slovenia	2:18.60	
19	4	1	Joscelin Yeo	Singapore	2:18.61	
20	2	8	Lin Man-hsu	Chinese Taipei	2:18.86	
21	2	1	Alessia Filippi	Italy	2:19.21	
22	3	8	Siow Yi Ting	Malaysia	2:19.52	
23	3	7	Athina Tzavella	Greece	2:20.30	
24	1	2	Vered Borochovski	Israel	2:20.62	
25	1	4	Petra Banović	Croatia	2:20.83	
26	1	5	Park Na-ri	South Korea	2:21.48	
27	1	6	Lára Hrund Bjargardóttir	Iceland	2:22.00	
28	1	7	Marina Mulyayeva	Kazakhstan	2:24.25	
29	3	3	Qi Hui	China	2:26.02	
30	1	3	Louise Mai Jansen	Denmark	2:27.08	

=== Semifinals ===
==== Semifinal 1 ====
Rank	Lane	Name	Nationality	Time	Notes
1	4	Yana Klochkova	Ukraine	2:13.30	Q
2	5	Amanda Beard	United States	2:13.51	Q
3	3	Beatrice Câșlaru	Romania	2:14.25	Q
4	2	Teresa Rohmann	Germany	2:14.47	Q
5	7	Joanna Melo	Brazil	2:15.43	
6	1	Georgina Bardach	Argentina	2:15.73	
7	6	Zhou Yafei	China	2:15.93	
8	8	Helen Norfolk	New Zealand	2:17.41	

==== Semifinal 2 ====
Rank	Lane	Name	Nationality	Time	Notes
1	5	Katie Hoff	United States	2:13.60	Q
2	4	Kirsty Coventry	Zimbabwe	2:13.68	Q
3	7	Lara Carroll	Australia	2:13.80	Q
4	6	Ágnes Kovács	Hungary	2:14.68	Q
5	3	Hanna Shcherba	Belarus	2:14.92	
6	2	Alice Mills	Australia	2:14.95	
7	1	Oxana Verevka	Russia	2:15.93	
8	8	Elizabeth Warden	Canada	2:17.32	

=== Final ===
Rank	Lane	Swimmer	Nation	Time	Notes
1st place, gold medalist(s)	4	Yana Klochkova	Ukraine	2:11.14	
2nd place, silver medalist(s)	5	Amanda Beard	United States	2:11.70	AM
3rd place, bronze medalist(s)	6	Kirsty Coventry	Zimbabwe	2:12.72	AF
4	8	Ágnes Kovács	Hungary	2:13.58	
5	1	Teresa Rohmann	Germany	2:13.74	
6	2	Lara Carroll	Australia	2:13.74	
7	3	Katie Hoff	United States	2:13.97	
8	7	Beatrice Câșlaru	Romania	2:15.40	
