= Sanjar Zokirov =

Uzbekistani judoka (born 1983)

Personal information
- Born: 6 January 1983 (age 43) Tashkent, Uzbek SSR, Soviet Union
- Occupation: Judoka
- Height: 1.72 m (5 ft 8 in)

Sport
- Country: Uzbekistan
- Sport: Judo
- Weight class: ‍–‍60 kg

Achievements and titles
- Olympic Games: R32 (2004)
- World Champ.: R16 (2003)
- Asian Champ.: (silver) (2003)
Medal record
Men's judo
Representing Uzbekistan
Asian Championships
Silver medal – second place	2003 Jeju	‍–‍60 kg
World Juniors Championships
Gold medal – first place	2002 Jeju	‍–‍60 kg

Profile at external databases
- IJF: 52792
- JudoInside.com: 15099
- Updated on 14 February 2022

Sanjar Zokirov (also Sanzhar Zakirov, Uzbek: Санжар Закиров; born 6 January 1983, in Tashkent) is an Uzbek judoka, who competed in the men's extra-lightweight category. He attained a fifth-place finish in the ‍–‍60 kg division at the 2002 Asian Games in Busan, South Korea, and also represented his nation Uzbekistan at the 2004 Summer Olympics.

Zokirov qualified for the Uzbek squad in the men's extra-lightweight class (60 kg) at the 2004 Summer Olympics in Athens, by placing fifth and receiving a berth from the Asian Championships in Almaty, Kazakhstan. He lost his opening match to Georgian-born Greek judoka Revazi Zintiridis, who scored an ippon victory and quickly subdued him on the tatami with a tani otoshi (valley drop) twenty-seven seconds remaining into their bout.
