= Masoud Haji Akhondzadeh =

Iranian judoka (born 1978)

Personal information
- Born: 29 April 1978 (age 48) Mashhad, Imperial State of Iran
- Occupation: Judoka

Sport
- Country: Iran
- Sport: Judo
- Weight class: ‍–‍60 kg

Achievements and titles
- Olympic Games: 5th (2004)
- World Champ.: 7th (2003)
- Asian Champ.: (gold) (2001, 2002, 2007)
Medal record
Men's judo
Representing Iran
Asian Games
Gold medal – first place	2002 Busan	‍–‍60 kg
Bronze medal – third place	2006 Doha	‍–‍60 kg
Asian Championships
Gold medal – first place	2001 Ulaanbaatar	‍–‍60 kg
Gold medal – first place	2007 Kuwait City	‍–‍60 kg
Silver medal – second place	2008 Jeju	‍–‍60 kg
Bronze medal – third place	1999 Wenzhou	‍–‍60 kg

Profile at external databases
- IJF: 10650
- JudoInside.com: 9968
- Updated on 1 April 2024

Masoud Haji Akhondzade (Persian: مسعود حاجی آخوندزاده; born 29 April 1978 in Mashhad) is an Iranian judoka.

Haji Akhondzade finished in joint fifth place in the extra-lightweight (60 kg) division at the 2004 Summer Olympics, having lost the bronze medal match to Choi Min-Ho of South Korea. He won a gold medal in 2002 Busan Asian Games by defeating Bazarbek Donbay of Kazakhstan.
