= Cristóbal Aburto =

Mexican judoka

Cristobal Aburto
Personal information
- Full name: Cristobal Alejandro Aburto Tinoco
- Nationality: Mexico
- Born: 2 October 1975 (age 50) Morelia, Michoacán, Mexico
- Height: 1.61 m (5 ft 3 1/2 in)
- Weight: 60 kg (132 lb)

Sport
- Sport: Judo
- Event: 60 kg

Cristobal Alejandro Aburto Tinoco (born October 2, 1975, in Morelia, Michoacán) is a Mexican judoka, who competed in the men's extra-lightweight category. He finished fifth in the 60-kg division at the 2003 Pan American Games in Santo Domingo, Dominican Republic, and also represented his nation Mexico at the 2004 Summer Olympics.

Aburto qualified for the three-person Mexican judo squad in the men's extra-lightweight class (60 kg) at the 2004 Summer Olympics in Athens, by placing fifth and receiving a berth from the Pan American Championships in Margarita Island, Venezuela. He scored a double koka in his opening match to thwart Costa Rica's David Fernández with a seoi nage (shoulder throw) assault, before succumbed to an ippon and a tani otoshi (valley drop) throw from Argentina's Miguel Albarracín in the round of 16.
