= Diego Gutiérrez (volleyball) =

Argentine volleyball player (born 1976)

Personal information
- Nationality: Argentine
- Born: 27 May 1976 (age 50)
- Height: 1.86 m (6 ft 1 in)
- Weight: 85 kg (187 lb)
- Spike: 330 cm (130 in)
- Block: 315 cm (124 in)

Volleyball information
- Number: 7

Career
Years	Teams
2004	(Germany) Evivo Düren

National team
2004	Argentina

Diego Gutiérrez (born 27 May 1976) is a former Argentine male volleyball player. He was part of the Argentina men's national volleyball team. He competed with the national team at the 2004 Summer Olympics in Athens, Greece. He played with Evivo Düren in 2004.

== Clubs ==
- (Germany) Evivo Düren (2004)

== See also ==
- Argentina at the 2004 Summer Olympics
