= Sabria Dahane =

Algerian swimmer (born 1985)

Personal information
- Full name: Sabria-Faiza Dahane
- National team: Algeria
- Born: 7 February 1985 (age 41) Algiers, Algeria
- Height: 1.61 m (5 ft 3 in)
- Weight: 60 kg (132 lb)

Sport
- Sport: Swimming
- Strokes: Individual medley
- Club: Lyon Natation (FRA)

Sabria-Faiza Dahane (Arabic: صبرية دهان; born 7 February 1985) is an Algerian former swimmer, who specialized in individual medley events. She is a member of the Lyon Swimming Club (French: Clubs de natation à Lyon) in Lyon, France.

Dahane qualified for the women's 400 m individual medley at the 2004 Summer Olympics in Athens, by attaining both an Algerian record and a B-standard entry time of 5:00.74. She finished in last place on the first heat by more than nine seconds behind Bulgaria's Ana Dangalakova, recording a slowest time of 5:10.20. Dahane failed to advance into the final, as she placed twenty-fourth overall in the morning's preliminary heats.
