= Evgeny Stanev =

Russian judoka

Personal information
- Born: 25 September 1979 (age 46)
- Occupation: Judoka

Sport
- Country: Russia
- Sport: Judo
- Weight class: –60 kg

Achievements and titles
- Olympic Games: 9th (2004)
- World Champ.: 7th (1999)
- European Champ.: (bronze) (2002, 2004)
Medal record
Men's judo
Representing Russia
European Championships
Bronze medal – third place	2002 Maribor	–60 kg
Bronze medal – third place	2004 Bucharest	–60 kg
World Juniors Championships
Silver medal – second place	1998 Cali	–60 kg

Profile at external databases
- IJF: 38631
- JudoInside.com: 603
- Updated on 17 November 2022

Evgeny Stanev (born 25 September 1979) is a Russian judoka.

== Achievements ==
Year	Tournament	Place	Weight class
2004	European Judo Championships	3rd	Extra lightweight (60 kg)
2003	European Judo Championships	5th	Extra lightweight (60 kg)
2002	European Judo Championships	3rd	Extra lightweight (60 kg)
1999	World Judo Championships	7th	Extra lightweight (60 kg)
