= Scott Fernandis =

Australian Olympic judoka

Personal information
- Full name: Scott Fernandis
- Nationality: Australia
- Born: 17 May 1981 (age 45) Canberra, Australia
- Occupation: Judoka
- Height: 1.63 m (5 ft 4 in)
- Weight: 60 kg (132 lb)

Sport
- Sport: Judo
- Event: 60 kg
- Club: Marist Judo Club
- Coached by: Arthur Moorshead

Profile at external databases
- JudoInside.com: 18373

Scott Fernandis (born 17 May 1981 in Canberra) is an Australian judoka, who competed in the men's extra-lightweight category. He held the 2003 Australian title in his own division, picked up eight medals in his career, including a bronze from the 2004 Oceania Championships in Nouméa, New Caledonia, and represented his nation Australia in the 66-kg class at the 2004 Summer Olympics. Throughout his sporting career, Fernandis trained full-time for the senior team at Marist Judo Club in his native Canberra, under head coach and sensei Arthur Moorshead (later died in 2010).

Fernandis qualified for the Australian squad in the men's extra-lightweight class (60 kg) at the 2004 Summer Olympics in Athens, by placing third and receiving a berth from the Oceania Championships in Nouméa, New Caledonia. He lost his opening match to British judoka and European silver medalist Craig Fallon, who scored a comfortable ippon victory and quickly subdued him on the tatami with a tai otoshi (body drop) at thirty-seven seconds.
