= Judo at the 2002 Asian Games – Men's 60 kg =

Judo competition

Men's 60 kg at the 2002 Asian Games
- Venue: Gudeok Gymnasium
- Date: 3 October 2002
- Competitors: 16 from 16 nations

Medalists
gold medal	Masoud Haji Akhondzadeh	Iran
silver medal	Bazarbek Donbay	Kazakhstan
bronze medal	Choi Min-ho	South Korea
bronze medal	Masato Uchishiba	Japan

The men's 60 kilograms (Extra lightweight) competition at the 2002 Asian Games in Busan was held on 3 October at the Gudeok Gymnasium.

== Schedule ==
All times are Korea Standard Time (UTC+09:00)

Date	Time	Event
Thursday, 3 October 2002	14:00	1 round
Thursday, 3 October 2002	14:00	2 round
Thursday, 3 October 2002	14:00	3 round
Thursday, 3 October 2002	14:00	Repechage 1 round
Thursday, 3 October 2002	14:00	Repechage 2 round
Thursday, 3 October 2002	14:00	Repechage 3 round
Thursday, 3 October 2002	14:00	Semifinals
Thursday, 3 October 2002	18:00	Finals

== Results ==
=== Main bracket ===
==== Final ====
Final
Bazarbek Donbay (KAZ)	0010
Masoud Haji Akhondzadeh (IRI)	0200

==== Top half ====
1 round
Bazarbek Donbay (KAZ)	1022
Abdullah Al-Matari (YEM)	0000

2 round
Chen Ping-shen (TPE)	0000
Tahir Amandurdyýew (TKM)	1000
Bazarbek Donbay (KAZ)	1001
Yuen Yuk Hei (HKG)	0001
Choi Min-ho (KOR)	0000
Masato Uchishiba (JPN)	1100
Abraham Pulia (PHI)	0000
Dondogdorjiin Javkhlantögs (MGL)	1010

3 round
Tahir Amandurdyýew (TKM)	0000
Bazarbek Donbay (KAZ)	1010
Masato Uchishiba (JPN)	1000
Dondogdorjiin Javkhlantögs (MGL)	0000

Semifinals
Bazarbek Donbay (KAZ)	0011
Masato Uchishiba (JPN)	0002

==== Bottom half ====
1 round

2 round
Namyr Tursunbaev (KGZ)
Bye
Sanjar Zokirov (UZB)	0011
Jia Yunbing (CHN)	1002
Masoud Haji Akhondzadeh (IRI)	1001
Akram Shah (IND)	0000
Narendra Kumar Dangol (NEP)	0001
Khaled Al-Dhafeeri (KUW)	1110

3 round
Namyr Tursunbaev (KGZ)	0000
Jia Yunbing (CHN)	1100
Masoud Haji Akhondzadeh (IRI)	1001
Khaled Al-Dhafeeri (KUW)	0000

Semifinals
Jia Yunbing (CHN)	0102
Masoud Haji Akhondzadeh (IRI)	0200

=== Repechage ===
Repechage 1 round
Abdullah Al-Matari (YEM)	0000
Yuen Yuk Hei (HKG)	1001

Repechage 2 round
Yuen Yuk Hei (HKG)	0001
Tahir Amandurdyýew (TKM)	1002
Choi Min-ho (KOR)	1000
Dondogdorjiin Javkhlantögs (MGL)	0000
Sanjar Zokirov (UZB)	1000
Namyr Tursunbaev (KGZ)	0000
Akram Shah (IND)	1010
Khaled Al-Dhafeeri (KUW)	0010

Repechage 3 round
Tahir Amandurdyýew (TKM)	0000
Choi Min-ho (KOR)	1000
Sanjar Zokirov (UZB)	0111
Akram Shah (IND)	0021

Bronze medal match
Choi Min-ho (KOR)	1000
Jia Yunbing (CHN)	0000
Sanjar Zokirov (UZB)	0001
Masato Uchishiba (JPN)	1012
