= Ana Dangalakova =

Bulgarian swimmer (born 1987)

Personal information
- Full name: Ana Dangalakova
- National team: Bulgaria
- Born: 2 June 1987 (age 39) Sofia, Bulgaria
- Height: 1.73 m (5 ft 8 in)
- Weight: 64 kg (141 lb)

Sport
- Sport: Swimming
- Strokes: Individual medley
- Club: Spirala Silistra
- College team: University of Nevada, Las Vegas (U.S.)

Ana Dangalakova (Bulgarian: Ана Дангалакова; born 2 June 1987) is a Bulgarian former swimmer, who specialized in individual medley events.

She claimed a gold medal in the 400m individual medley at the 2006 Mountain West Conference Championships in Oklahoma City, Oklahoma, in an outstanding time of 4:24.69.

She is also the daughter of breaststroke specialist Tanya Dangalakova, who won Bulgaria's first and only gold medal in swimming at the 1988 Summer Olympics in Seoul, South Korea.

== Career ==
Dangalakova qualified for the women's 400m individual medley at the 2004 Summer Olympics in Athens, by attaining a B-standard entry time of 4:59.51 from the European Aquatics Championships in Madrid, Spain. She finished behind winner Nimitta Thaveesupsoonthorn on the first heat by less than six hundredths of a second (0.06), in a time of 5:01.00. Dangalakova failed to qualify for the final, as she placed twenty-third overall in the morning's preliminary heats.

Dangalakova is also a member of the swimming team for the UNLV Rebels, and a graduate of hospitality management at the University of Nevada, Las Vegas.
