= Pak Nam-chol (judoka) =

North Korean judoka

Personal information
- Full name: Pak Nam-chol
- Nationality: North Korea
- Born: 12 January 1979 (age 47) Pyongyang, North Korea
- Height: 1.68 m (5 ft 6 in)
- Weight: 60 kg (132 lb)

Sport
- Sport: Judo
- Event: 60 kg

Korean name
- Hangul: 박남철
- RR: Bak Namcheol
- MR: Pak Namch'ŏl

Pak Nam-chol (Korean: 박남철; born January 12, 1979, in Pyongyang) is a North Korean judoka, who competed in the men's extra-lightweight category. He finished fifth in the 60-kg division at the 2003 World Judo Championships in Osaka, Japan, and later represented his nation North Korea at the 2004 Summer Olympics.

Pak qualified as a lone male judoka for the North Korean squad in the men's extra-lightweight class (60 kg) at the 2004 Summer Olympics in Athens, by placing fifth and receiving a berth from the World Championships in Osaka, Japan. Facing a rematch against Tunisia's Anis Lounifi after his bronze medal defeat at the World Championships, Pak could not mount enough strength to topple his opponent with a harai goshi (sweeping hip throw), and thereby lost his opening bout by an ippon at one minute and twenty-eight seconds.
