= Kenji Uematsu =

Spanish judoka (born 1976)

Personal information
- Born: 28 October 1976 (age 50)
- Occupation: Judoka

Sport
- Sport: Judo

Profile at external databases
- JudoInside.com: 639

Kenji Uematsu (born 28 October 1976 in Portugalete) is a Spanish judoka. His father is Japanese and his mother is Spanish. His younger brother, Kiyoshi, is also a professional judoka.

== Achievements ==
Year	Tournament	Place	Weight class
2004	Olympic Games	5th	Extra lightweight (60 kg)
