= Nestor Khergiani =

Georgian judoka (born 1975)

Personal information
- Born: 20 July 1975 (age 51)
- Occupation: Judoka

Sport
- Country: Georgia
- Sport: Judo
- Weight class: –60 kg

Achievements and titles
- Olympic Games: (silver) (2004)
- World Champ.: (silver) (2007)
- European Champ.: (gold) (1998, 2003)
Medal record
Men's judo
Representing Georgia
Olympic Games
Silver medal – second place	2004 Athens	‍–‍60 kg
World Championships
Gold medal – first place	2006 Paris	Men's team
Gold medal – first place	2008 Tokyo	Men's team
Silver medal – second place	2002 Basel	Men's team
Silver medal – second place	2007 Rio de Janeiro	‍–‍60 kg
Bronze medal – third place	1999 Birmingham	‍–‍60 kg
European Championships
Gold medal – first place	1998 Oviedo	‍–‍60 kg
Gold medal – first place	2002 Maribor	Men's team
Gold medal – first place	2003 Düsseldorf	‍–‍60 kg
Gold medal – first place	2003 London	Men's team
Gold medal – first place	2007 Minsk	Men's team
Bronze medal – third place	1996 St. Petersburg	Men's team
Bronze medal – third place	1999 Bratislava	‍–‍60 kg
Bronze medal – third place	2000 Wrocław	‍–‍60 kg
Bronze medal – third place	2001 Paris	‍–‍60 kg
Bronze medal – third place	2002 Maribor	‍–‍60 kg
Bronze medal – third place	2006 Belgrade	Men's team
Bronze medal – third place	2007 Belgrade	‍–‍60 kg
Bronze medal – third place	2008 Lisbon	‍–‍60 kg
Bronze medal – third place	2009 Tbilisi	‍–‍60 kg
Summer Universiade
Bronze medal – third place	1999 Palma de Mallorca	‍–‍60 kg

Profile at external databases
- IJF: 767
- JudoInside.com: 405
- Updated on 30 May 2023

Nestor Khergiani (Georgian: ნესტორ ხერგიანი, born 20 July 1975) is a Georgian judoka. He obtained silver medal at the 2004 Summer Olympics in the ‍–‍60 kg event where he lost in the final to Tadahiro Nomura. Khergiani won silver in 2007 World Judo Championships and bronze in 1999 World Judo Championships. At the European Judo Championships he won gold in 1998 and 2003, bronze in 1999, 2000, 2001, 2002, 2007, 2008 and 2009.

Khergiani has been a scholarship holder with the Olympic Solidarity program since August 2001.

== Achievements ==
Year	Tournament	Place	Weight class
2009	European Championships	3rd	Extra lightweight (60 kg)
2008	European Championships	3rd	Extra lightweight (60 kg)
2007	World Judo Championships	2nd	Extra lightweight (60 kg)
2007	European Judo Championships	3rd	Extra lightweight (60 kg)
2006	European Judo Championships	5th	Extra lightweight (60 kg)
2004	Olympic Games	2nd	Extra lightweight (60 kg)
2003	European Judo Championships	1st	Extra lightweight (60 kg)
2002	European Judo Championships	3rd	Extra lightweight (60 kg)
2001	World Judo Championships	5th	Extra lightweight (60 kg)
2001	European Judo Championships	3rd	Extra lightweight (60 kg)
2000	European Judo Championships	3rd	Extra lightweight (60 kg)
1999	World Judo Championships	3rd	Extra lightweight (60 kg)
1999	European Judo Championships	3rd	Extra lightweight (60 kg)
1998	European Judo Championships	1st	Extra lightweight (60 kg)
1997	European Judo Championships	7th	Extra lightweight (60 kg)
