= Vasiliki Angelopoulou =

Greek swimmer (born 1987)

Personal information
- Full name: Vasiliki Angelopoulou
- National team: Greece
- Born: 30 May 1987 (age 39) Athens, Greece
- Height: 1.59 m (5 ft 3 in)
- Weight: 49 kg (108 lb)

Sport
- Sport: Swimming
- Strokes: Butterfly, medley
- Club: AE Haidariou
Medal record
Women's swimming
Representing Greece
European Junior Championships
| Gold medal – first place | 2003 Glasgow | 200 m butterfly |
| Silver medal – second place | 2003 Glasgow | 200 m medley |

Vasiliki Angelopoulou (Greek: Βασιλική Αγγελοπούλου; born 30 May 1987 in Athens) is a retired Greek swimmer, who specialized in butterfly and individual medley events. Angelopoulou broke both a national and a European junior record of 2:10.64 to claim a gold medal in the 200 m butterfly at the 2003 European Junior Swimming Championships in Glasgow, Scotland. Angelopoulou also held the distinction of being the first female Greek swimmer to reach an Olympic final.

Angelopoulou qualified for two swimming events at the 2004 Summer Olympics in Athens, representing the host nation Greece. She achieved a FINA A-standard entry time of 2:10.64 (200 m butterfly) from the European Junior Swimming Championships On the first day of the competition, Angelopoulou set a Greek record time of 4:44.90, to secure her spot in the final of the 400 m individual medley. Being the nation's first female swimmer in the swimming final, Angelopoulou finished in last place by half a second (0.50) behind South Korea's Nam Yoo-Sun, in a time of 4:50.85. In the 200 m butterfly, Angelopoulou failed to qualify for the semifinals, as she placed twenty-second in the preliminary heats, outside her personal best time of 2:13.88.
