= Revazi Zintiridis =

Greek judoka

Personal information
- Born: 1 October 1985 (age 41)
- Occupation: Judoka

Sport
- Country: Greece
- Sport: Judo
- Weight class: ‍–‍60 kg

Achievements and titles
- Olympic Games: 7th (2004)
- World Champ.: 5th (2005)
- European Champ.: (silver) (2004)
Medal record
Men's judo
Representing Greece
European Championships
Silver medal – second place	2004 Bucharest	‍–‍60 kg
European U23 Championships
Bronze medal – third place	2005 Kyiv	‍–‍66 kg
Bronze medal – third place	2006 Moscow	‍–‍66 kg
European Junior Championships
Silver medal – second place	2002 Rotterdam	‍–‍60 kg

Profile at external databases
- IJF: 52789
- JudoInside.com: 31057
- Updated on 17 November 2022

Revazi Zintiridis (Greek: Ρεβάζι Ζιντιρίδης; born 1 October 1985 in Georgia) is a Greek judoka.

== Achievements ==
Year	Tournament	Place	Weight class
2005	World Judo Championships	5th	Extra lightweight (60 kg)
2004	Olympic Games	7th	Extra lightweight (60 kg)
2004	European Judo Championships	2nd	Extra lightweight (60 kg)
