= Maiko Fujino =

Japanese swimmer (born 1983)

Personal information
- Full name: Maiko Fujino
- National team: Japan
- Born: 25 May 1983 (age 43) Adachi, Tokyo, Japan
- Height: 1.61 m (5 ft 3 in)
- Weight: 55 kg (121 lb)

Sport
- Sport: Swimming
- Strokes: Freestyle, medley
- Club: FB International
- Coach: Taro Fujii
Medal record
Women's swimming
Representing Japan
Pan Pacific Championships
Bronze medal – third place	2002 Yokohama	400 m medley
Asian Games
Silver medal – second place	2002 Busan	400 m medley
Bronze medal – third place	2002 Busan	200 m medley
Bronze medal – third place	2006 Doha	200 m medley
Bronze medal – third place	2006 Doha	400 m medley
Bronze medal – third place	2010 Guangzhou	800 m freestyle

Maiko Fujino (藤野 舞子, Fujino Maiko; born May 25, 1983) is a Japanese swimmer, who specialized in long-distance freestyle and individual medley events. She represented her nation Japan at the 2008 Summer Olympics, and has won a career total of six medals (one silver and five bronze) in a major international competition, spanning the Pan Pacific Championships and three editions of the Asian Games (2002 to 2010). Fujino was also a student at Takushoku University in Tokyo.

Fujino made her own swimming history at the 2002 Pan Pacific Swimming Championships in Yokohama, quickly claiming the bronze medal in the 400 m individual medley with a time of 4:45.79. The following year, Fujino picked up two more medals in the same stroke (silver in the 400, and bronze in the 200) at the 2003 Summer Universiade in Daegu, South Korea, posting respective marks of 2:17.41 and 4:48.44.

Five years later, Fujino competed in two swimming events at the 2008 Summer Olympics in Beijing. Leading up to the Games, she cleared FINA A-standard entry times of 8:34.17 (800 m freestyle) and 4:40.14 (400 m individual medley) at the Olympic trials in Tokyo to earn an outright selection on the Japanese team. On the first day of the Games, Fujino posted her personal best of 4:37.35 in the preliminary heats of the 400 m individual medley, but missed out the final by less than 0.21 of a second in eleventh place. In her second event, 800 m freestyle, Fujino challenged seven other swimmers on the third heat, including former Olympic champion Camelia Potec of Romania, 14-year-old Li Xuanxu of China, and top medal favorite Katie Hoff of the United States. She raced to sixth place by five seconds behind Venezuela's Andreina Pinto in 8:35.60. For the second time, Fujino failed to advance to the top 8 final, placing herself in twenty-first overall on the evening prelims.

Fujino also became the first female Japanese swimmer to dip under 4:30 barrier in the 400 m individual medley, smashing a Japanese record and her own tech suit best of 4:29.77 at the 2009 Japan Open in Tokyo.
