= Nimitta Thaveesupsoonthorn =

Thai swimmer (born 1989)

Personal information
- Full name: Nimitta Thaveesupsoonthorn
- Nicknames: Noey, ChaCha, Nim
- National team: Thailand
- Born: 17 October 1989 (age 36) Bangkok, Thailand
- Height: 1.63 m (5 ft 4 in)
- Weight: 59 kg (130 lb)

Sport
- Sport: Swimming
- Strokes: Individual medley
Medal record
Women's swimming
Representing Thailand
Southeast Asian Games
Gold medal – first place	2005 Manila	400 m medley
Bronze medal – third place	2005 Manila	800 m freestyle
Bronze medal – third place	2005 Manila	200 m medley
Bronze medal – third place	2007 Bangkok	200 m medley

Nimitta Thaveesupsoonthorn (Thai: นิมิตรา ทวีทรัพย์สุนทร; born October 17, 1989, in Bangkok) is a Thai former swimmer, who specialized in long-distance freestyle and individual medley events. She represented her nation Thailand in two editions of the Olympic Games (2004 and 2008), and also won a career total of four medals, one gold and three bronzes, at the Southeast Asian Games (2005 and 2007).

Thaveesupsoonthorn made her first Thai team, as a fourteen-year-old, at the 2004 Summer Olympics in Athens, competing in the women's 400 m individual medley. Despite failing to overhaul the five-minute barrier, Thaveesupsoonthorn stormed home with a powerful swim throughout the race to a victory in heat one over Bulgaria's Ana Dangalakova and Algeria's Sabria Dahane, but her lifetime best of 5:00.06 would be enough to put the Thai rising stalwart to twenty-second overall position.

At the 2008 Summer Olympics in Beijing, Thaveesupsoonthorn qualified for the second time in the women's 400 m individual medley by clearing a FINA B-cut of 4:54.47 from the Malaysia Open Championships four months earlier in Kuala Lumpur. Swimming in the same heat as the previous Games, Thaveesupsoonthorn struggled through the race for another Olympic victory in heat one, and then eventually faded on the freestyle lap to last place in a field of thirty-seven with a time of 5:02.18.
