= Misa Amano =

Japanese swimmer (born 1986)

Personal information
- Full name: Misa Amano
- National team: Japan
- Born: 15 October 1986 (age 39) Kanagawa, Japan
- Height: 1.61 m (5 ft 3 in)
- Weight: 53 kg (117 lb)

Sport
- Sport: Swimming
- Strokes: Individual medley

Misa Amano (天野 美沙, Amano Misa; born October 15, 1986 in Kanagawa) is a Japanese swimmer, who specialized in individual medley events. She is a 2004 Olympian, and a multiple-time Japanese record holder in both the 200 and 400 m individual medley.

Amano qualified for the medley swimming events, as a 17-year-old, at the 2004 Summer Olympics in Athens, by attaining an A-standard entry time of 4:43.72 from the Japanese Olympic trials. On the first day of the competition, Amano finished tenth in the preliminary heats of the women's 400 m individual medley with a time of 4:45.61, failing to qualify for the final by 0.45 of a second outside the top 8. In the 200 m individual medley, Amano continued her luck in the preliminary heats, as she missed again a spot for the semifinals by more than six tenths of a second (0.60) behind New Zealand's Helen Norfolk, in a time of 2:17.88.
