= Oliver Gussenberg =

German judoka

Personal information
- Born: 28 October 1976 (age 48)
- Occupation: Judoka

Sport
- Sport: Judo

Profile at external databases
- JudoInside.com: 288

Oliver Gussenberg (born 28 October 1976 in Oldenburg) is a German judoka.

== Achievements ==
Year	Tournament	Place	Weight class
2004	Olympic Games	7th	Extra lightweight (60 kg)
2003	World Judo Championships	5th	Extra lightweight (60 kg)
1998	European Judo Championships	5th	Extra lightweight (60 kg)
