= Lin Man-hsu =

Taiwanese swimmer (born 1989)

Personal information
- Full name: Lin Man-hsu
- National team: Chinese Taipei
- Born: 3 March 1989 (age 37) Taipei, Taiwan
- Height: 1.71 m (5 ft 7 in)
- Weight: 61 kg (134 lb)

Sport
- Sport: Swimming
- Strokes: Backstroke, medley

Lin Man-hsu (Chinese: 林 蔓繻; pinyin: Lín Mànxū; born March 3, 1989) is a Taiwanese swimmer, who specialized in backstroke and individual medley events. She represented the Chinese Taipei national team in two editions of the Olympic Games (2004 and 2008).

Lin made her own swimming history, as one of Taiwan's youngest athletes (aged 15), at the 2004 Summer Olympics in Athens, competing in the 200 m backstroke and a medley double. First, she slowed down her stretch to finish in last place and twentieth overall in heat four of the 400 m individual medley, finishing at 4:52.22. Two days later, in the 200 m individual medley, Lin took a late charge on the freestyle lap to surge past Italy's Alessia Filippi for seventh in heat two with a steady 2:18.86, matching her overall position from the first half of a medley double. In her third event, the 200 m backstroke, Lin pulled ahead from the bottom half of the field to hit the wall in fourth place and twenty-fourth overall at her lifetime best of 2:17.68, ending her Olympic chances of making to the semifinals.

At the 2008 Summer Olympics in Beijing, Lin decided to drop her two other events and instead focus on the 200 m individual medley. Swimming at the end of the field in heat one, she finished the race steadily to fifth and thirty-sixth overall with a mark of 2:23.29, just five seconds slower than her previous Olympic feat.
