= Teresa Rohmann =

German medley swimmer

Personal information
- Full name: Teresa Rohmann
- Nationality: Germany
- Born: July 24, 1987 (age 39) Nuremberg, West Germany
- Height: 1.67 m (5 ft 6 in)
- Weight: 63 kg (139 lb)

Sport
- Sport: Swimming
- Strokes: Medley
- Club: SSG 81 Erlangen
Medal record
European Championships (SC)
Gold medal – first place	2004 Vienna	200 m medley
Silver medal – second place	2004 Vienna	400 m medley
Bronze medal – third place	2003 Dublin	200 m medley
Bronze medal – third place	2003 Dublin	400 m medley
Bronze medal – third place	2004 Vienna	100 m medley

Teresa Rohmann (born July 24, 1987 in Nuremberg) is a medley swimmer from Germany. She competed for her native country at the 2004 Summer Olympics in Athens, Greece, finishing in fifth place in the women's 200m individual medley event.
