= Miguel Albarracín =

Argentinian Olympic judoka (born 1981)

Personal information
- Full name: Miguel Ángel Albarracín
- Born: 8 June 1981 (age 45) Pinto, Santiago del Estero, Argentina
- Occupation: Judoka

Sport
- Sport: Judo
Medal record
Men's judo
Representing Argentina
Pan American Games
Gold medal – first place	2007 Rio de Janeiro	Extra Lightweight
Bronze medal – third place	2003 Santo Domingo	Extra Lightweight
South American Games
Gold medal – first place	2006 Buenos Aires	Extra Lightweight
Silver medal – second place	2002 Rio de Janeiro	Extra Lightweight

Profile at external databases
- JudoInside.com: 12371

Miguel Ángel Albarracín (born 8 June 1981 in Pinto, Santiago del Estero) is a male judoka from Argentina, who won the gold medal at the 2007 Pan American Games in Rio de Janeiro. He represented his native country at the 2004 Summer Olympics in Athens, Greece.
