= Nam Yoo-sun =

South Korean swimmer (born 1985)

Personal information
- Full name: Nam Yoo-sun
- National team: South Korea
- Born: 23 July 1985 (age 40) Seoul, South Korea
- Height: 1.67 m (5 ft 6 in)
- Weight: 46 kg (101 lb)

Korean name
- Hangul: 남유선
- RR: Nam Yuseon
- MR: Nam Yusŏn

Sport
- Sport: Swimming
- Strokes: Individual medley
- Club: Gyeongsangnamdo Sports Council
- College team: Seoul National University
- Coach: An Jong-taek
Medal record
Women's swimming
Representing South Korea
East Asian Games
Silver medal – second place	2005 Macau	400 m medley
Bronze medal – third place	2005 Macau	200 m medley

Nam Yoo-sun (Korean: 남유선; born July 23, 1985) is a South Korean swimmer, who specialized in individual medley events. She is a three-time Olympian (2000, 2004, and 2008), a fourth-place finalist at the 2002 Asian Games in Busan, and a two-time medalist in the individual medley (both 200 and 400 m) at the 2005 East Asian Games in Macau, China. Nam became the first South Korean swimmer in history to reach an Olympic final, until Park Tae-Hwan won the nation's first ever swimming medal at the succeeding Olympics in 2008.

Nam made her first South Korean team, as a 15-year-old, at the 2000 Summer Olympics in Sydney, where she competed in the women's 200 m individual medley. Swimming in heat two, she raced to fourth place and twenty-seventh overall by nearly five seconds behind winner Hana Černá of the Czech Republic in 2:22.53.

At the 2004 Summer Olympics in Athens, Nam placed seventh in the 400 m individual medley with a time of 4:50.35, edging out Greece's Vasiliki Angelopoulou by exactly half a second (0.50).

Eight years after her Olympic debut, Nam qualified for her third South Korean team, as a 23-year-old, at the 2008 Summer Olympics in Beijing. She eclipsed a FINA B-standard entry time of 4:52.38 from the Dong-A Swimming Championships in Ulsan. In the 400 m individual medley, she topped the first heat by five seconds ahead of Singapore's Quah Ting Wen with a time of 4:46.74. Nam failed to reach the top 8 final, as she placed twenty-eighth overall in the prelims.
