= 2003 World Wrestling Championships – Men's freestyle 74 kg =

Men's freestyle 74 kg at the 2003 World Championships
- Venue: Madison Square Garden
- Dates: 12–14 September 2003
- Competitors: 35 from 35 nations

Medalists
| gold medal | Buvaisar Saitiev | Russia |
| silver medal | Murad Gaidarov | Belarus |
| bronze medal | Gennadiy Laliyev | Kazakhstan |

The men's freestyle 74 kilograms is a competition featured at the 2003 World Wrestling Championships, and was held at the Madison Square Garden in New York, United States from 12 to 14 September 2003.

== Results ==
Legend

- F — Won by fall

=== Preliminary round ===
==== Pool 1 ====
| Pos | Athlete | Pld | W | L | CP | TP | CAN | CHN | PUR |
|---|---|---|---|---|---|---|---|---|---|
| 1 | Daniel Igali (CAN) | 2 | 2 | 0 | 6 | 12 | — | 7–1 | 5–3 |
| 2 | Siriguleng (CHN) | 2 | 1 | 1 | 5 | 11 | 1–3 PP | — | 10–0 |
| 3 | Esteban Vera (PUR) | 2 | 0 | 2 | 1 | 3 | 1–3 PP | 0–4 ST | — |

Source: Official website

==== Pool 2 ====
| Pos | Athlete | Pld | W | L | CP | TP | KAZ | GBR | KGZ |
|---|---|---|---|---|---|---|---|---|---|
| 1 | Gennadiy Laliyev (KAZ) | 2 | 2 | 0 | 7 | 15 | — | 10–0 | 5–0 |
| 2 | Nate Ackerman (GBR) | 2 | 1 | 1 | 4 | 0 | 0–4 ST | — | WO |
| 3 | Talant Jekshenov (KGZ) | 2 | 0 | 2 | 0 | 0 | 0–3 PO | 0–4 PA | — |

Source: Official website

==== Pool 3 ====
| Pos | Athlete | Pld | W | L | CP | TP | HUN | LAT | ESP |
|---|---|---|---|---|---|---|---|---|---|
| 1 | Árpád Ritter (HUN) | 2 | 2 | 0 | 7 | 18 | — | 10–0 | 8–3 |
| 2 | Jānis Leišavnieks (LAT) | 2 | 1 | 1 | 4 | 6 | 0–4 ST | — | 6–0 Fall |
| 3 | Carlos Domínguez (ESP) | 2 | 0 | 2 | 1 | 3 | 1–3 PP | 0–4 TO | — |

Source: Official website

==== Pool 4 ====
| Pos | Athlete | Pld | W | L | CP | TP | AZE | UZB | MGL |
|---|---|---|---|---|---|---|---|---|---|
| 1 | Elnur Aslanov (AZE) | 2 | 2 | 0 | 6 | 8 | — | 5–4 | 3–0 |
| 2 | Magomedali Gadjilavov (UZB) | 2 | 1 | 1 | 4 | 8 | 1–3 PP | — | 4–0 |
| 3 | Battuyaagiin Batchuluun (MGL) | 2 | 0 | 2 | 1 | 0 | 0–3 PO | 0–3 PO | — |

Source: Official website

==== Pool 5 ====
| Pos | Athlete | Pld | W | L | CP | TP | BLR | ARM | GEO |
|---|---|---|---|---|---|---|---|---|---|
| 1 | Murad Gaidarov (BLR) | 2 | 2 | 0 | 6 | 9 | — | 3–2 | 6–0 |
| 2 | Arayik Gevorgyan (ARM) | 2 | 1 | 1 | 4 | 9 | 1–3 PP | — | 7–4 |
| 3 | Gela Saghirashvili (GEO) | 2 | 0 | 2 | 1 | 4 | 0–3 PO | 1–3 PP | — |

Source: Official website

==== Pool 6 ====
| Pos | Athlete | Pld | W | L | CP | TP | JPN | TUR | ROM |
|---|---|---|---|---|---|---|---|---|---|
| 1 | Kunihiko Obata (JPN) | 2 | 2 | 0 | 7 | 17 | — | 14–3 | 3–0 |
| 2 | Hakkı Ceylan (TUR) | 2 | 1 | 1 | 4 | 8 | 1–4 SP | — | 5–4 |
| 3 | Eugen Preda (ROM) | 2 | 0 | 2 | 1 | 4 | 0–3 PO | 1–3 PP | — |

Source: Official website

==== Pool 7 ====
| Pos | Athlete | Pld | W | L | CP | TP | MKD | GER | KOR |
|---|---|---|---|---|---|---|---|---|---|
| 1 | Sihamir Osmanov (MKD) | 2 | 1 | 1 | 5 | 6 | — | 1–3 | 5–1 Fall |
| 2 | Dennis Blum (GER) | 2 | 1 | 1 | 4 | 4 | 3–1 PP | — | 1–3 |
| 3 | Jang Jae-sung (KOR) | 2 | 1 | 1 | 3 | 4 | 0–4 TO | 3–1 PP | — |

Source: Official website

==== Pool 8 ====
| Pos | Athlete | Pld | W | L | CP | TP | RUS | BUL | SEN |
|---|---|---|---|---|---|---|---|---|---|
| 1 | Buvaisar Saitiev (RUS) | 2 | 2 | 0 | 7 | 38 | — | 4–1 | 34–2 |
| 2 | Nikolay Paslar (BUL) | 2 | 1 | 1 | 5 | 5 | 1–3 PP | — | 4–0 Fall |
| 3 | Jean Diatta (SEN) | 2 | 0 | 2 | 1 | 2 | 1–4 SP | 0–4 TO | — |

Source: Official website

==== Pool 9 ====
| Pos | Athlete | Pld | W | L | CP | TP | AUS | ITA | GRE |
|---|---|---|---|---|---|---|---|---|---|
| 1 | Talgat Ilyasov (AUS) | 2 | 2 | 0 | 6 | 6 | — | 3–0 | 3–2 |
| 2 | Salvatore Rinella (ITA) | 2 | 1 | 1 | 3 | 3 | 0–3 PO | — | 3–2 |
| 3 | Felix Polianidis (GRE) | 2 | 0 | 2 | 2 | 4 | 1–3 PP | 1–3 PP | — |

Source: Official website

==== Pool 10 ====
| Pos | Athlete | Pld | W | L | CP | TP | IND | UKR | PAN | TPE |
|---|---|---|---|---|---|---|---|---|---|---|
| 1 | Sujeet Maan (IND) | 3 | 3 | 0 | 12 | 23 | — | 8–4 Fall | 3–0 Ret | 12–2 |
| 2 | Zaza Zazirov (UKR) | 3 | 2 | 1 | 8 | 19 | 0–4 TO | — | 10–0 | 5–1 Fall |
| 3 | Leonardo González (PAN) | 3 | 1 | 2 | 4 | 7 | 0–4 PA | 0–4 ST | — | 7–0 Fall |
| 4 | Huang Chih-wen (TPE) | 3 | 0 | 3 | 1 | 3 | 1–4 SP | 0–4 TO | 0–4 TO | — |

Source: Official website

==== Pool 11 ====
| Pos | Athlete | Pld | W | L | CP | TP | IRI | USA | MDA | VEN |
|---|---|---|---|---|---|---|---|---|---|---|
| 1 | Hadi Habibi (IRI) | 3 | 3 | 0 | 10 | 21 | — | 3–1 | 8–2 | 10–0 |
| 2 | Joe Williams (USA) | 3 | 2 | 1 | 8 | 18 | 1–3 PP | — | 6–0 | 11–0 Fall |
| 3 | Ivan Diaconu (MDA) | 3 | 1 | 2 | 5 | 12 | 1–3 PP | 0–3 PO | — | 10–0 |
| 4 | Jhonny Cedeño (VEN) | 3 | 0 | 3 | 0 | 0 | 0–4 ST | 0–4 TO | 0–4 ST | — |

Source: Official website

=== Knockout round ===
Round of 16
Daniel Igali (CAN) | 1
Gennadiy Laliyev (KAZ) | 4
Árpád Ritter (HUN) | 8
Elnur Aslanov (AZE) | 5
Murad Gaidarov (BLR) | 3
Kunihiko Obata (JPN) | 1

Quarterfinals
Gennadiy Laliyev (KAZ) | 2
Árpád Ritter (HUN) | 1
Murad Gaidarov (BLR) | 3
Sihamir Osmanov (MKD) | 2
Buvaisar Saitiev (RUS) | 9
Talgat Ilyasov (AUS) | 1
Sujeet Maan (IND) | 0
Hadi Habibi (IRI) | 3^{F}

Semifinals
Gennadiy Laliyev (KAZ) | 2
Murad Gaidarov (BLR) | 4
Buvaisar Saitiev (RUS) | 6
Hadi Habibi (IRI) | 3

Final
Murad Gaidarov (BLR) | 2
Buvaisar Saitiev (RUS) | 2
Bronze medal match
Gennadiy Laliyev (KAZ) | 5
Hadi Habibi (IRI) | 1
