= 2001 World Wrestling Championships – Men's freestyle 76 kg =

Men's freestyle 76 kg at the 2001 World Championships
- Venue: Winter Sports Palace
- Dates: 22–24 November 2001
- Competitors: 32 from 32 nations

Medalists
gold medal	Buvaisar Saitiev	Russia
silver medal	Moon Eui-jae	South Korea
bronze medal	Joe Williams	United States

The men's freestyle 76 kilograms is a competition featured at the 2001 World Wrestling Championships, and was held at the Winter Sports Palace in Sofia, Bulgaria from 22 to 24 November 2001.

== Results ==
=== Preliminary round ===
==== Pool 1 ====
Pos	Athlete	Pld	W	L	CP	TP	ROM	POL	CUB
1	Eugen Preda (ROM)	2	2	0	6	6	—	3–0	3–1
2	Radosław Horbik (POL)	2	1	1	3	3	0–3 PO	—	3–2
3	Yosmany Romero (CUB)	2	0	2	2	3	1–3 PP	1–3 PP	—

Source: Official website

==== Pool 2 ====
Pos	Athlete	Pld	W	L	CP	TP	USA	CAN	ITA
1	Joe Williams (USA)	2	2	0	6	7	—	4–3	3–0
2	Nick Ugoalah (CAN)	2	1	1	4	10	1–3 PP	—	7–2
3	Salvatore Rinella (ITA)	2	0	2	1	2	0–3 PO	1–3 PP	—

Source: Official website

==== Pool 3 ====
Pos	Athlete	Pld	W	L	CP	TP	TUR	PUR	LAT
1	Gökhan Yavaşer (TUR)	2	2	0	7	21	—	11–2	10–0
2	Manuel García (PUR)	2	1	1	4	6	1–3 PP	—	4–2
3	Jānis Leišavnieks (LAT)	2	0	2	1	2	0–4 ST	1–3 PP	—

Source: Official website

==== Pool 4 ====
Pos	Athlete	Pld	W	L	CP	TP	IRI	BLR	MGL
1	Mehdi Hajizadeh (IRI)	2	2	0	6	11	—	7–1	4–0
2	Murad Gaidarov (BLR)	2	1	1	5	7	1–3 PP	—	6–1 Fall
3	Buyandelgeriin Batbayar (MGL)	2	0	2	0	1	0–3 PO	0–4 TO	—

Source: Official website

==== Pool 5 ====
Pos	Athlete	Pld	W	L	CP	TP	RUS	UZB	JPN
1	Buvaisar Saitiev (RUS)	2	2	0	6	11	—	4–3	7–0
2	Ruslan Khinchagov (UZB)	2	1	1	4	7	1–3 PP	—	4–1
3	Kunihiko Obata (JPN)	2	0	2	1	1	0–3 PO	1–3 PP	—

Source: Official website

==== Pool 6 ====
Pos	Athlete	Pld	W	L	CP	TP	GEO	GER	UKR
1	Revaz Mindorashvili (GEO)	2	2	0	6	10	—	3–2	7–5
2	Alexander Leipold (GER)	2	1	1	4	7	1–3 PP	—	5–3
3	Volodymyr Syrotyn (UKR)	2	0	2	2	8	1–3 PP	1–3 PP	—

Source: Official website

==== Pool 7 ====
Pos	Athlete	Pld	W	L	CP	TP	HUN	KAZ	KGZ
1	Árpád Ritter (HUN)	2	2	0	6	9	—	3–2	6–0
2	Gennadiy Laliyev (KAZ)	2	1	1	4	8	1–3 PP	—	6–1
3	Almazbek Ergeshov (KGZ)	2	0	2	1	1	0–3 PO	1–3 PP	—

Source: Official website

==== Pool 8 ====
Pos	Athlete	Pld	W	L	CP	TP	KOR	GRE	VIE
1	Moon Eui-jae (KOR)	2	2	0	7	21	—	9–2	12–2
2	Felix Polianidis (GRE)	2	1	1	5	12	1–3 PP	—	10–0
3	Phạm Thanh Quyết (VIE)	2	0	2	1	2	1–4 SP	0–4 ST	—

Source: Official website

==== Pool 9 ====
Pos	Athlete	Pld	W	L	CP	TP	SVK	IND	AZE	ARM
1	Radion Kertanti (SVK)	3	2	1	9	25	—	14–4	1–4	10–0
2	Sujeet Maan (IND)	3	2	1	8	24	1–4 SP	—	9–7	11–2 Fall
3	Elshad Allahverdiyev (AZE)	3	2	1	8	22	3–1 PP	1–3 PP	—	11–2 Fall
4	Garsevan Vardanyan (ARM)	3	0	3	0	4	0–4 ST	0–4 TO	0–4 TO	—

Source: Official website

==== Pool 10 ====
Pos	Athlete	Pld	W	L	CP	TP	FIN	BUL	ISR	GBR
1	Jari Olmala (FIN)	3	3	0	9	18	—	4–1	7–3	7–3
2	Miroslav Gochev (BUL)	3	2	1	9	17	1–3 PP	—	5–0 Fall	11–0 Fall
3	Sergey Kolesnikov (ISR)	3	1	2	5	20	1–3 PP	0–4 TO	—	17–7
4	Nate Ackerman (GBR)	3	0	3	2	10	1–3 PP	0–4 TO	1–4 SP	—

Source: Official website

=== Knockout round ===
Round of 16
Eugen Preda (ROM)	1
Joe Williams (USA)	3
Gökhan Yavaşer (TUR)	2
Mehdi Hajizadeh (IRI)	4

Quarterfinals
Joe Williams (USA)	7
Mehdi Hajizadeh (IRI)	3
Buvaisar Saitiev (RUS)	3
Revaz Mindorashvili (GEO)	2
Árpád Ritter (HUN)	7
Moon Eui-jae (KOR)	8
Radion Kertanti (SVK)	10
Jari Olmala (FIN)	0

Semifinals
Joe Williams (USA)	4
Buvaisar Saitiev (RUS)	5
Moon Eui-jae (KOR)	6
Radion Kertanti (SVK)	0

Final
Buvaisar Saitiev (RUS)	3
Moon Eui-jae (KOR)	2
Bronze medal match
Joe Williams (USA)	10
Radion Kertanti (SVK)	0
