= Buvaisar Saitiev =

Russian wrestler and politician (1975–2025)

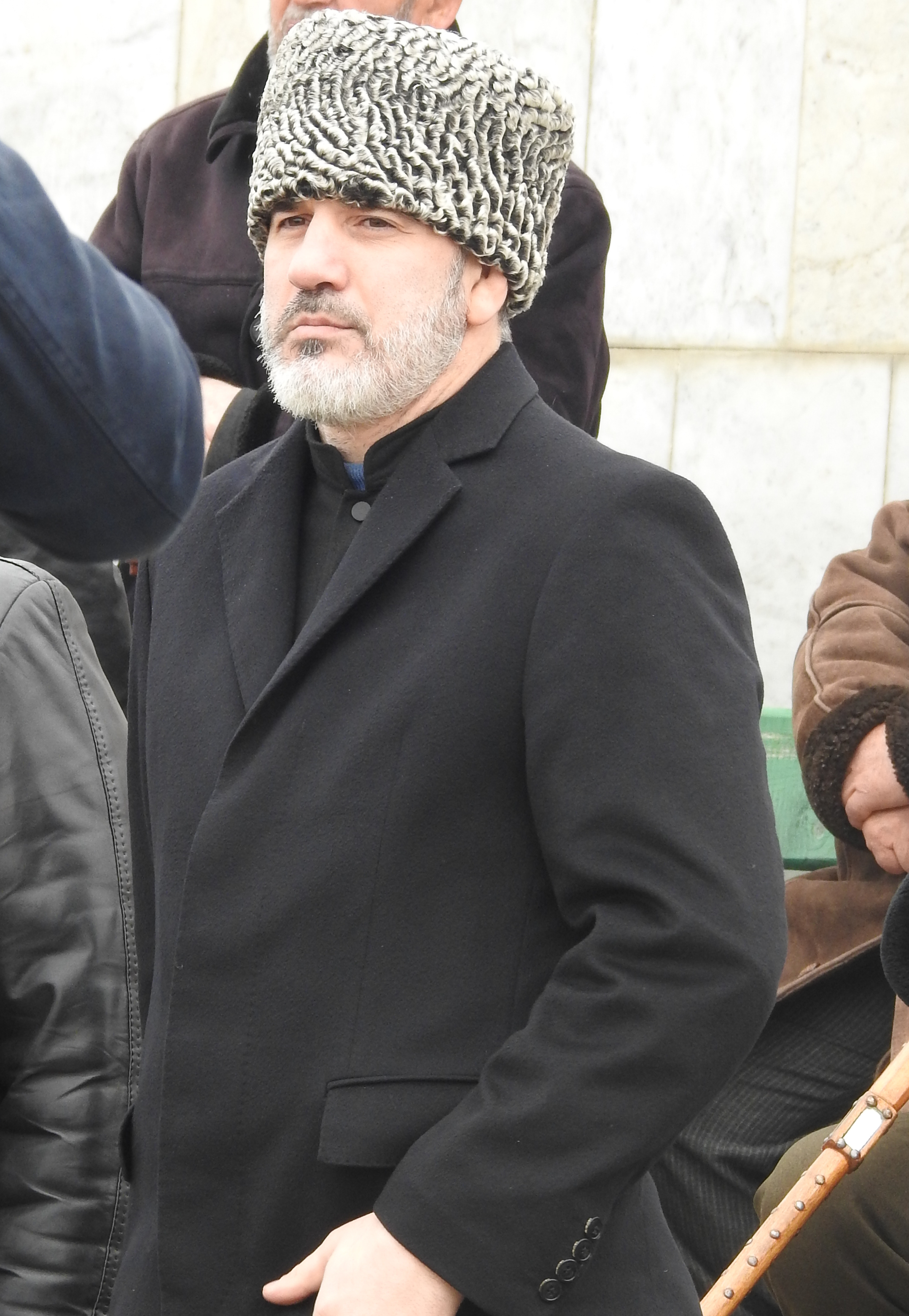
- Saitiev in 2020

Personal information
- Born: 11 March 1975 Khasavyurt, Dagestan ASSR, Russian SFSR, Soviet Union
- Died: 2 March 2025 (aged 49) Moscow, Russia
- Height: 1.83 m (6 ft 0 in)
- Weight: 74 kg (163 lb)

Sport
- Country: Russia
- Sport: Wrestling
- Event: Freestyle
- Club: Mindiashvili wrestling academy
- Coached by: Dmitri Mindiashvili
- Retired: 2008
Medal record
Men's freestyle wrestling
Representing Russia
| Event | 1st | 2nd | 3rd |
|---|---|---|---|
| Olympic Games | 3 | - | - |
| World Championships | 6 | - | - |
| Wrestling World Cup | - | - | 1 |
| European Championships | 6 | - | - |
| Total | 15 | 0 | 1 |
Olympic Games
| Gold medal – first place | 1996 Atlanta | 74 kg |
| Gold medal – first place | 2004 Athens | 74 kg |
| Gold medal – first place | 2008 Beijing | 74 kg |
World Championships
| Gold medal – first place | Atlanta 1995 | 74 kg |
| Gold medal – first place | Krasnoyarsk 1997 | 76 kg |
| Gold medal – first place | Tehran 1998 | 76 kg |
| Gold medal – first place | Sofia 2001 | 76 kg |
| Gold medal – first place | New York 2003 | 74 kg |
| Gold medal – first place | Budapest 2005 | 74 kg |
European Championships
| Gold medal – first place | Budapest 1996 | 74 kg |
| Gold medal – first place | Warsaw 1997 | 76 kg |
| Gold medal – first place | Bratislava 1998 | 85 kg |
| Gold medal – first place | Budapest 2000 | 76 kg |
| Gold medal – first place | Budapest 2001 | 76 kg |
| Gold medal – first place | Moscow 2006 | 74 kg |
World Cup
| Bronze medal – third place | Edmonton 1994 | 74 kg |

Buvaisar Hamidovich Saitiev (Note: also Buvaysar Hamidovich Saytiev) (Russian: Бувайсар Хамидович Сайтиев, Chechen: Сайт КIант Бувайса; 11 March 1975 – 2 March 2025) was a Russian wrestler and politician. His total of nine world-level gold medals (three Olympics, six World Championships) in freestyle wrestling is second highest, behind Aleksandr Medved's 10. Saitiev is widely considered to be the greatest freestyle wrestler of all time; in 2007, he and Greco-Roman practitioner Aleksandr Karelin were voted the best wrestlers in the history of the sport by FILA.

After his retirement from competition, Saitiev served as an acting deputy from Dagestan in the 7th State Duma from 2016 until he stepped down in 2021. In 2015, he became the President of the Chechen Wrestling Federation, a position he held until his death in 2025.

== Personal life ==
Saitiev was born in Khasavyurt, Dagestan, Russian Federation on 11 March 1975, and was of Chechen descent. Saitiev left his hometown in 1992 in order to train at a prestigious wrestling center in Krasnoyarsk, Russian Federation. His younger brother Adam Saitiev later followed in his footsteps, winning gold in the 2000 Summer Olympics in Sydney.

Soon after graduating from the training center, Saitiev began his quest to represent Russia on the world stage. Saitiev was decorated with the Order of Friendship by the Russian president.

Saitiev's life philosophy was heavily influenced by Nobel Prize-winning poet Boris Pasternak. Saitiev repeated Pasternak's poem, "It is not seemly to be famous," before every match, and according to Saitiev, the poem defined his life both inside and outside of wrestling.

Saitiev had three sons and one daughter.

=== Death ===
Saitiev died in Moscow on 2 March 2025, at the age of 49. Executive director of the Russian Wrestling Federation, Makhmud Magomedov, stated that Saitiev died of cardiac arrest, and Russia's minister of sport Mikhail Degtyarev said Saitiev had been ill, frequently visiting medical centres. Saitiev's widow, Indira, stated Saitiev had fallen out of a second-storey window before his death, indicating it was a non-accidental death. Russian outlet Baza reported that a janitor found Saitiev lying injured on the ground near a residence on Minskaya Street, and called for an ambulance. Baza said Saitiev later died in hospital. Saitiev's death created an outpouring of grief. Khabib Nurmagomedov wrote on social media that "Saitiev inspired millions of children around the world", and Ramzan Kadyrov, head of the Chechen Republic, said Saitiev was "not only a legendary athlete, but also a man of high honour." Kadyrov announced three days of mourning in Chechnya in honour of Saitiev. Saitiev was a practicing Muslim and was buried next to his father in his hometown of Khasavyurt, Dagestan, Russian Federation following Muslim tradition.

== Wrestling career ==
Saitiev won nine World-level gold medals. He was a six-time World champion and a three-time Olympic champion. His senior level international career began in 1994 and continued on through the 2008 Summer Olympics in Beijing, China. In thirteen years, he competed in eleven World or Olympic championship tournaments, winning nine gold medals at those events and losing only two bouts. Saitiev won at the World championships in 1995, 1997, 1998, 2001, 2003 and 2005, and at the Olympics in 1996, 2004 and 2008.

In 1999, Saitiev did not wrestle at the World championships, instead his weight class was represented by his younger brother Adam Saitiev, who went on to win the gold medal. Saitiev also did not compete at the World Championships in 2002. In 2007, according to media reports, Saitiev's training in was hampered by a neck injury.

Despite his success, Saitiev suffered a number of losses in his senior career. He suffered his first loss in his senior career at the 1994 World Wrestling Cup to Davoud Ghanbari. At the 2000 Summer Olympics, Saitiev lost to Brandon Slay. Saitiev lost to Magomed Isagadzhiev at the 2002 Russian Nationals. Saitiev then lost to Mihail Ganev at the 2006 World Wrestling Championships. Saitiev lost at the 2007 Russian Nationals to Makhach Murtazaliev. He then lost at the 2008 Ivan Yarygin Grand Prix, also to Murtazaliev.

His Olympic gold medal at the 2008 Summer Olympics was his last wrestling competition and the final of his nine total World or Olympic level championships.

== Legacy ==
In March 2025, it was decided to name a street in the Akhmatovsky District of Grozny, where the Republican Center for Wrestling is being built, after Buvaisar Saitiev.

In April 2025, the Russian Junior Wrestling Championship in memory of Saitiev was held in Grozny.

Since 2009, the city of Eupen in Belgium has hosted an international tournament named after Buvaisar Saitiev. In 2014, the competition was dedicated to the Saitiev brothers. Since 2025, it has once again been held in memory of Buvaisar Saitiev.

== Match results ==
World Championships & Olympics
| Res. | Record | Opponent | Score | Date | Event | Location |
2008 Summer Olympics (gold) at 74kg
| Win | 46-2 | (Uzbekistan) Soslan Tigiev | 0–1, 1–0, 3–1 | August 12, 2008 | 2008 Olympic Games | Beijing, China |
| Win | 45-2 | (Bulgaria) Kiril Terziev | Fall | August 12, 2008 | 2008 Olympic Games | Beijing, China |
| Win | 44-2 | (Cuba) Iván Fundora | 2-0, 2-1 | August 12, 2008 | 2008 Olympic Games | Beijing, China |
| Win | 43-2 | (Turkey) Ahmet Gülhan | 1-0, 4-0 | August 12, 2008 | 2008 Olympic Games | Beijing, China |
| Win | 42-2 | (South Korea) Cho Byung-kwan | 1-0, 7-2 | August 12, 2008 | 2008 Olympic Games | Beijing, China |
2006 World Championships 8th at 74kg
| Loss | 41-2 | (Bulgaria) Mihail Ganev | 3-0, 2-2, 1-1 | September 27, 2006 | 2006 World Wrestling Championships | Guangzhou, China |
| Win | 41-1 | (Cuba) Iván Fundora | 5-3, 7-2 | September 27, 2006 | 2006 World Wrestling Championships | Guangzhou, China |
| Win | 40-1 | (Venezuela) Maximo Blanco | 4-1, 5-0 | September 27, 2006 | 2006 World Wrestling Championships | Guangzhou, China |
2005 World Championships (gold) at 74kg
| Win | 39-1 | (Hungary) Árpád Ritter | 3-0, 3-1 | September 26, 2005 | 2005 World Wrestling Championships | Budapest, Hungary |
| Win | 38-1 | (Iran) Mehdi Hajizadeh | 6-0, 5-3 | September 26, 2005 | 2005 World Wrestling Championships | Budapest, Hungary |
| Win | 37-1 | (Italy) Salvatore Rinella | 6-1, 5-0 | September 26, 2005 | 2005 World Wrestling Championships | Budapest, Hungary |
| Win | 36-1 | (Bulgaria) Nikolay Paslar | 3-0, 3-1 | September 26, 2005 | 2005 World Wrestling Championships | Budapest, Hungary |
| Win | 35-1 | (United Kingdom) Malak Mohamed Osman | 2-0, 9-0 | September 26, 2005 | 2005 World Wrestling Championships | Budapest, Hungary |
2004 Summer Olympics (gold) at 74kg
| Win | 34-1 | (Kazakhstan) Gennadiy Laliyev | 7-0 | August 26, 2004 | 2004 Olympic Games | Athens, Greece |
| Win | 33-1 | (Poland) Krystian Brzozowski | 8-0 | August 26, 2004 | 2004 Olympic Games | Athens, Greece |
| Win | 32-1 | (Belarus) Murad Gaidarov | 3-2 | August 26, 2004 | 2004 Olympic Games | Athens, Greece |
| Win | 31-1 | (Greece) Emzarios Bentinidis | 6-1 | August 26, 2004 | 2004 Olympic Games | Athens, Greece |
| Win | 30-1 | (Hungary) Árpád Ritter | 8-2 | August 26, 2004 | 2004 Olympic Games | Athens, Greece |
2003 World Championships (gold) at 74kg
| Win | 29-1 | (Belarus) Murad Gaidarov | 2-2 | September 12, 2003 | 2003 World Wrestling Championships | New York City, United States |
| Win | 28-1 | (Iran) Hadi Habibi | 6-3 | September 12, 2003 | 2003 World Wrestling Championships | New York City, United States |
| Win | 27-1 | (Australia) Talgat Ilyasov | 9-1 | September 12, 2003 | 2003 World Wrestling Championships | New York City, United States |
| Win | 26-1 | (Bulgaria) Nikolay Paslar | 4-1 | September 12, 2003 | 2003 World Wrestling Championships | New York City, United States |
| Win | 25-1 | (Senegal) Jean Bernard Diatta | Tech. Fall | September 12, 2003 | 2003 World Wrestling Championships | New York City, United States |
2001 World Championships (gold) at 76kg
| Win | 24-1 | (South Korea) Moon Eui-jae | 3-2 | November 22, 2001 | 2001 World Wrestling Championships | Sofia, Bulgaria |
| Win | 23-1 | (United States) Joe Williams | 5-4 | November 22, 2001 | 2001 World Wrestling Championships | Sofia, Bulgaria |
| Win | 22-1 | (Georgia (country)) Revaz Mindorashvili | 3-2 | November 22, 2001 | 2001 World Wrestling Championships | Sofia, Bulgaria |
| Win | 21-1 | (Japan) Kunihiko Obata | 7-0 | November 22, 2001 | 2001 World Wrestling Championships | Sofia, Bulgaria |
| Win | 20-1 | (Uzbekistan) Ruslan Khinchagov | 4-3 | November 22, 2001 | 2001 World Wrestling Championships | Sofia, Bulgaria |
2000 Summer Olympics 9th at 76kg
| Loss | 19-1 | (United States) Brandon Slay | 3-4 | September 28, 2000 | 2000 Olympic Games | (Australia) Sydney |
| Win | 19-0 | (Bulgaria) Plamen Paskalev | 8-2 | September 28, 2000 | 2000 Olympic Games | (Australia) Sydney |
1998 World Championships (gold) at 76kg
| Win | 18-0 | (South Korea) Moon Eui-jae | 3-0 | September 7, 1998 | 1998 World Wrestling Championships | Tehran, Iran |
| Win | 17-0 | (Poland) Marcin Jurecki | Fall | September 7, 1998 | 1998 World Wrestling Championships | Tehran, Iran |
| Win | 16-0 | (Georgia (country)) Alexander Kahniasvili | Tech. Fall | September 7, 1998 | 1998 World Wrestling Championships | Tehran, Iran |
| Win | 15-0 | (Moldova) Victor Peikov | Tech. Fall | September 7, 1998 | 1998 World Wrestling Championships | Tehran, Iran |
1997 World Championships (gold) at 76kg
| Win | 14-0 | (Germany) Alexander Leipold | 3-1 | August 29, 1997 | 1997 World Wrestling Championships | Krasnojarsk, Russia |
| Win | 13-0 | (South Korea) Moon Eui-jae | 6-2 | August 29, 1997 | 1997 World Wrestling Championships | Krasnojarsk, Russia |
| Win | 12-0 | (Ukraine) David Bichinashvili | 7-0 | August 29, 1997 | 1997 World Wrestling Championships | Krasnojarsk, Russia |
| Win | 11-0 | (Hungary) Arpad Ritter | 6-0 | August 29, 1997 | 1997 World Wrestling Championships | Krasnojarsk, Russia |
| Win | 10-0 | (Canada) Nicholas Ugoalah | Fall | August 29, 1997 | 1997 World Wrestling Championships | Krasnojarsk, Russia |
1996 Summer Olympics (gold) at 74kg
| Win | 9-0 | (South Korea) Park Jang-soon | 5-0 | July 30, 1996 | 1996 Olympic Games | Atlanta, United States |
| Win | 8-0 | (United States) Kenny Monday | 6-1 | July 30, 1996 | 1996 Olympic Games | Atlanta, United States |
| Win | 7-0 | (Germany) Alexander Leipold | 3-1 | July 30, 1996 | 1996 Olympic Games | Atlanta, United States |
| Win | 6-0 | (Iran) Issa Momeni | 8-0 | July 30, 1996 | 1996 Olympic Games | Atlanta, United States |
1995 World Championships (gold) at 74kg
| Win | 5-0 | (Germany) Alexander Leipold | 3-2 | August 10, 1995 | 1995 World Wrestling Championships | Atlanta, United States |
| Win | 4-0 | (Azerbaijan) Magomedsalam Gadzhiev | 3-0 | August 10, 1995 | 1995 World Wrestling Championships | Atlanta, United States |
| Win | 3-0 | (Moldova) Victor Peikov | 12-3 | August 10, 1995 | 1995 World Wrestling Championships | Atlanta, United States |
| Win | 2-0 | (Poland) Krzysztof Walencik | Fall | August 10, 1995 | 1995 World Wrestling Championships | Atlanta, United States |
| Win | 1-0 | (Cuba) Alberto Rodríguez | Tech. Fall | August 10, 1995 | 1995 World Wrestling Championships | Atlanta, United States |
