= 2005 World Wrestling Championships – Men's freestyle 74 kg =

Men's freestyle 74 kg at the 2005 World Championships
- Venue: László Papp Budapest Sports Arena
- Dates: 27 September 2005
- Competitors: 36 from 36 nations

Medalists
| gold medal | Buvaisar Saitiev | Russia |
| silver medal | Árpád Ritter | Hungary |
| bronze medal | Joe Williams | United States |
| bronze medal | Nikolay Paslar | Bulgaria |

The men's freestyle 74 kilograms is a competition featured at the 2005 World Wrestling Championships, and was held at the László Papp Budapest Sports Arena in Budapest, Hungary on 27 September 2005.

== Results ==
Legend

- F — Won by fall
- WO — Won by walkover

=== Finals ===
| Semifinals | | | Final |
| Joe Williams (USA) | 0 | 0 |
| Árpád Ritter (HUN) | 3 | 1 | Árpád Ritter (HUN) | 0 | 1 |
| Buvaisar Saitiev (RUS) | 6 | 5 | Buvaisar Saitiev (RUS) | 3 | 3 |
| Mehdi Hajizadeh (IRI) | 0 | 3 |

=== Top half ===
==== Section 1 ====
Round of 64

Round of 32
Joe Williams (USA) | 2 | 4
Kunihiko Obata (JPN) | 0 | 0
Ahmet Gülhan (TUR) | 1 | 1 | 1
Davit Akhalmosulishvili (GEO) | 5 | 0 | 0
Soslan Tigiev (UZB) | 2 | 2
Harutyun Yenokyan (ARM) | 0 | 0
Yusup Abdusalomov (TJK) | 3^{F}
Cho Yong-pil (KOR) | 0

Round of 16
Joe Williams (USA) | 1 | 1
Ahmet Gülhan (TUR) | 0 | 0
Soslan Tigiev (UZB) | 0 | 3 | 4^{F}
Yusup Abdusalomov (TJK) | 1 | 0 | 0

Quarterfinals
Joe Williams (USA) | 0 | 1 | 1
Soslan Tigiev (UZB) | 1 | 0 | 0

==== Section 2 ====
Round of 64

Round of 32
Peter Weisenberger (GER) | 1 | 2 | 0
Alexandru Burcă (MDA) | 4 | 0 | 1
Árpád Ritter (HUN) | 1 | 2
Carlos Domínguez (ESP) | 0 | 0
Kaisar Boranbayev (KAZ) | 2 | 0
Talant Jekshenov (KGZ) | 3 | 6
Daniel Dancák (SVK) | 0 | 3 | 0
Elnur Aliyev (AZE) | 4 | 1 | 2

Round of 16
Alexandru Burcă (MDA) | 0 | 0
Árpád Ritter (HUN) | 1 | 1
Talant Jekshenov (KGZ) | 7 | 6
Elnur Aliyev (AZE) | 1 | 0

Quarterfinals
Árpád Ritter (HUN) | 6 | 3
Talant Jekshenov (KGZ) | 0 | 1

=== Bottom half ===
==== Section 3 ====
Round of 64

Round of 32
Salvatore Rinella (ITA) | 2 | 3
Haris Tajić (BIH) | 1 | 0
Brent Duggan (IRL) | 0 | 0
Siriguleng (CHN) | 6 | 5
Buvaisar Saitiev (RUS) | 2 | 9
Mohamed Osman Malak (GBR) | 0 | 0
Ayman Ezzeddine (LIB) | 0 | 0
Nikolay Paslar (BUL) | 4 | 3

Round of 16
Salvatore Rinella (ITA) | 1 | 5
Siriguleng (CHN) | 1 | 4
Buvaisar Saitiev (RUS) | 1 | 2
Nikolay Paslar (BUL) | 0 | 0

Quarterfinals
Salvatore Rinella (ITA) | 1 | 0
Buvaisar Saitiev (RUS) | 6 | 5

==== Section 4 ====
Round of 64
Bayarsaikhany Batjargal (MGL) | 8 | 7^{F}
Soerdas Roepa (SUR) | 0 | 0
Iván Fundora (CUB) | 6^{F}
Richard Ramos (DOM) | 0
Mehdi Hajizadeh (IRI) | 3 | 5
Zoltan Hunyady (CAN) | 0 | 0
Narender Tomar (IND) | 0 | 0
Volodymyr Syrotyn (UKR) | 7 | 1

Round of 32
Mohammed Siddiq (QAT) | 0 | 1
Krystian Brzozowski (POL) | 7 | 3
Leonardo González (PAN) | 0 | 0
Theodosios Pavlidis (GRE) | 1 | 2
Bayarsaikhany Batjargal (MGL) | 1 | 1
Iván Fundora (CUB) | 3 | 7
Mehdi Hajizadeh (IRI) | 2 | 1
Volodymyr Syrotyn (UKR) | 0 | 1

Round of 16
Krystian Brzozowski (POL) | 0 | 3 | 2
Theodosios Pavlidis (GRE) | 1 | 0 | 0
Iván Fundora (CUB) | 1 | 1 | 1
Mehdi Hajizadeh (IRI) | 1 | 4 | 4

Quarterfinals
Krystian Brzozowski (POL) | 1 | 1
Mehdi Hajizadeh (IRI) | 3 | 2

=== Repechage ===
Repechage round 2
Carlos Domínguez (ESP) | 1 | 0
Alexandru Burcă (MDA) | 2 | 1
Mohamed Osman Malak (GBR)
Nikolay Paslar (BUL) | W | O

Repechage round 3
Alexandru Burcă (MDA) | 6 | 2
Talant Jekshenov (KGZ) | 3 | 1
Nikolay Paslar (BUL) | 1 | 3
Salvatore Rinella (ITA) | 0 | 1

Bronze medals
Alexandru Burcă (MDA) | 0 | 3 | 1
Joe Williams (USA) | 3 | 0 | 3
Nikolay Paslar (BUL) | 1 | 2
Mehdi Hajizadeh (IRI) | 0 | 0
