= 2006 World Wrestling Championships – Men's freestyle 74 kg =

Men's freestyle 74 kg at the 2006 World Championships
- Venue: Tianhe Gymnasium
- Dates: 28 September 2006
- Competitors: 35 from 35 nations

Medalists
| gold medal | Ibragim Aldatov | Ukraine |
| silver medal | Ali Asghar Bazri | Iran |
| bronze medal | Soslan Tigiev | Uzbekistan |
| bronze medal | Donny Pritzlaff | United States |

The men's freestyle 74 kilograms is a competition featured at the 2006 World Wrestling Championships, and was held at the Tianhe Gymnasium in Guangzhou, China on 28 September 2006.

== Results ==
Legend

- F — Won by fall

=== Finals ===
| Semifinals | | | | Final |
| Mihail Ganev (BUL) | 0 | 0 |
| Ibragim Aldatov (UKR) | 6 | 3 | | Ibragim Aldatov (UKR) | 4 | 5 |
| Ali Asghar Bazri (IRI) | 0 | 6 | 1 | Ali Asghar Bazri (IRI) | 0 | 1 |
| Murad Gaidarov (BLR) | 1 | 0 | 0 |

=== Top half ===
==== Section 1 ====
Round of 64

Round of 32
Mihail Ganev (BUL) | 0 | 2 | 1
Kunihiko Obata (JPN) | 1 | 1 | 0
Matt Gentry (CAN) | 1 | 0 | 0
Ahmet Gülhan (TUR) | 1 | 3 | 3
Máximo Blanco (VEN) | 1 | 0
Buvaisar Saitiev (RUS) | 4 | 5
Alexandru Burcă (MDA) | 2 | 0
Iván Fundora (CUB) | 5 | 3

Round of 16
Mihail Ganev (BUL) | 1 | 8
Ahmet Gülhan (TUR) | 1 | 2
Buvaisar Saitiev (RUS) | 5 | 7
Iván Fundora (CUB) | 3 | 2

Quarterfinals
Mihail Ganev (BUL) | 0 | 2 | 1
Buvaisar Saitiev (RUS) | 3 | 2 | 1

==== Section 2 ====
Round of 64

Round of 32
Sombir (IND) | 0 | 0
Soslan Tigiev (UZB) | 6 | 7
Ibragim Aldatov (UKR) | 6 | 5
Lee Armstrong (AUS) | 0 | 0
Gela Saghirashvili (GEO) | 2 | 3
Elnur Aslanov (AZE) | 0 | 0
Anis Gharbi (FRA) | 1 | 0
Krystian Brzozowski (POL) | 3 | 2

Round of 16
Soslan Tigiev (UZB) | 0 | 1 | 1
Ibragim Aldatov (UKR) | 1 | 0 | 2
Gela Saghirashvili (GEO) | 1 | 3 | 0
Krystian Brzozowski (POL) | 4 | 0 | 1

Quarterfinals
Ibragim Aldatov (UKR) | 2 | 4
Krystian Brzozowski (POL) | 0 | 0

=== Bottom half ===
==== Section 3 ====
Round of 64

Round of 32
Ali Asghar Bazri (IRI) | 0 | 3 | 2
Abdulkhakim Shapiyev (KAZ) | 1 | 0 | 1
Gheorghiță Ștefan (ROM) | 2 | 0 | 4^{F}
Chuluundavaagiin Mönkhbayar (MGL) | 0 | 2 | 0
Nibaldo Candia (CHI) | 0 | 0
Ruslan Kokaev (ARM) | 5 | 6
Richard Addinall (RSA) | 1 | 0
Donny Pritzlaff (USA) | 3 | 7^{F}

Round of 16
Ali Asghar Bazri (IRI) | 3 | 1
Gheorghiță Ștefan (ROM) | 0 | 0
Ruslan Kokaev (ARM) | 2 | 1 | 0
Donny Pritzlaff (USA) | 1 | 2 | 3

Quarterfinals
Ali Asghar Bazri (IRI) | 2 | 1
Donny Pritzlaff (USA) | 0 | 1

==== Section 4 ====
Round of 64
Talant Jekshenov (KGZ) | 2 | 1
Cho Byung-kwan (KOR) | 0 | 0
Carlos Domínguez (ESP) | 0 | 0
Jānis Leišavnieks (LAT) | 1 | 2
Emzarios Bentinidis (GRE) | 1 | 2
Peter Weisenberger (GER) | 0 | 0

Round of 32
Gábor Hatos (HUN) | 3^{F}
Lê Duy Hợi (VIE) | 0
Jean-Noël Malo (CIV) | 0 | 0
Murad Gaidarov (BLR) | 1 | 3
Siriguleng (CHN) | 5 | 2
Talant Jekshenov (KGZ) | 1 | 1
Jānis Leišavnieks (LAT) | 1 | 0
Emzarios Bentinidis (GRE) | 9 | 6

Round of 16
Gábor Hatos (HUN) | 1 | 2
Murad Gaidarov (BLR) | 3 | 3
Siriguleng (CHN) | 3 | 0
Emzarios Bentinidis (GRE) | 3 | 5

Quarterfinals
Murad Gaidarov (BLR) | 4 | 3
Emzarios Bentinidis (GRE) | 1 | 2

=== Repechage ===
Repechage round 2
Lee Armstrong (AUS) | 0
Soslan Tigiev (UZB) | 4^{F}
Abdulkhakim Shapiyev (KAZ) | 3 | 1 | 1
Gheorghiță Ștefan (ROM) | 0 | 1 | 0

Repechage round 3
Soslan Tigiev (UZB) | 1 | 0 | 5
Krystian Brzozowski (POL) | 0 | 1 | 1
Abdulkhakim Shapiyev (KAZ) | 2 | 0
Donny Pritzlaff (USA) | 3 | 3

Bronze medals
Soslan Tigiev (UZB) | 3 | 2
Mihail Ganev (BUL) | 1 | 0
Donny Pritzlaff (USA) | 1 | 3 | 1
Murad Gaidarov (BLR) | 3 | 0 | 0
