= 2002 World Wrestling Championships – Men's freestyle 74 kg =

Men's freestyle 74 kg at the 2002 World Championships
- Venue: Azadi Indoor Stadium
- Dates: 6–7 September 2002
- Competitors: 29 from 29 nations

Medalists
gold medal	Mehdi Hajizadeh	Iran
silver medal	Magomed Isagadzhiev	Russia
bronze medal	Volodymyr Syrotyn	Ukraine

The men's freestyle 74 kilograms is a competition featured at the 2002 World Wrestling Championships, and was held at the Azadi Indoor Stadium in Tehran, Iran from 6 to 7 September 2002.

== Results ==
=== Preliminary round ===
==== Pool 1 ====
Pos	Athlete	Pld	W	L	CP	TP	CUB	BLR	HUN
1	Daniel González (CUB)	2	2	0	6	6	—	3–1	3–1
2	Murad Gaidarov (BLR)	2	1	1	4	4	1–3 PP	—	3–1
3	Árpád Ritter (HUN)	2	0	2	2	2	1–3 PP	1–3 PP	—

Source: Official website

==== Pool 2 ====
Pos	Athlete	Pld	W	L	CP	TP	IRI	MDA	JPN
1	Mehdi Hajizadeh (IRI)	2	2	0	7	17	—	12–1	5–2
2	Ivan Diaconu (MDA)	2	1	1	4	5	1–4 SP	—	4–1
3	Kunihiko Obata (JPN)	2	0	2	2	3	1–3 PP	1–3 PP	—

Source: Official website

==== Pool 3 ====
Pos	Athlete	Pld	W	L	CP	TP	KAZ	ARM	UZB
1	Gennadiy Laliyev (KAZ)	2	2	0	6	13	—	6–1	7–1
2	Bagratuni Barseghyan (ARM)	2	1	1	4	9	1–3 PP	—	8–4
3	Magomedali Gadjilavov (UZB)	2	0	2	2	5	1–3 PP	1–3 PP	—

Source: Official website

==== Pool 4 ====
Pos	Athlete	Pld	W	L	CP	TP	CHN	MKD	SEN
1	Xu Xuanchong (CHN)	2	2	0	7	17	—	5–0	12–2
2	Vlado Lazarov (MKD)	2	1	1	3	3	0–3 PO	—	3–2
3	Matar Sène (SEN)	2	0	2	2	4	1–4 SP	1–3 PP	—

Source: Official website

==== Pool 5 ====
Pos	Athlete	Pld	W	L	CP	TP	TUR	POL	FIN
1	Ahmet Gülhan (TUR)	2	2	0	6	10	—	3–0	7–0
2	Krystian Brzozowski (POL)	2	1	1	3	6	0–3 PO	—	6–4
3	Jari Olmala (FIN)	2	0	2	1	4	0–3 PO	1–3 PP	—

Source: Official website

==== Pool 6 ====
Pos	Athlete	Pld	W	L	CP	TP	UKR	ROM	GBR
1	Volodymyr Syrotyn (UKR)	2	2	0	7	17	—	3–2	14–3
2	Eugen Preda (ROM)	2	1	1	4	12	1–3 PP	—	10–3
3	Nate Ackerman (GBR)	2	0	2	2	6	1–4 SP	1–3 PP	—

Source: Official website

==== Pool 7 ====
Pos	Athlete	Pld	W	L	CP	TP	CAN	GRE	MGL
1	Daniel Igali (CAN)	2	2	0	6	12	—	5–0	7–0
2	Felix Polianidis (GRE)	2	1	1	3	4	0–3 PO	—	4–1
3	Battuyaagiin Batchuluun (MGL)	2	0	2	1	1	0–3 PO	1–3 PP	—

Source: Official website

==== Pool 8 ====
Pos	Athlete	Pld	W	L	CP	TP	RUS	AZE	GER	PER
1	Magomed Isagadzhiev (RUS)	3	3	0	10	22	—	6–3	5–2	11–0
2	Elshad Allahverdiyev (AZE)	3	2	1	8	20	1–3 PP	—	5–3	12–0
3	Alexander Leipold (GER)	3	1	2	6	16	1–3 PP	1–3 PP	—	11–1
4	David Cubas (PER)	3	0	3	1	1	0–4 ST	0–4 ST	1–4 SP	—

Source: Official website

==== Pool 9 ====
Pos	Athlete	Pld	W	L	CP	TP	GEO	BUL	KOR	IND
1	Guram Mchedlidze (GEO)	3	3	0	9	21	—	3–0	10–2	8–2
2	Nikolay Paslar (BUL)	3	2	1	6	14	0–3 PO	—	7–0	7–3
3	Choi Kwon-sub (KOR)	3	1	2	5	9	1–3 PP	0–3 PO	—	7–3 Fall
4	Narender Tomar (IND)	3	0	3	2	8	1–3 PP	1–3 PP	0–4 TO	—

Source: Official website

=== Knockout round ===
Round of 16
Daniel González (CUB)	0
Mehdi Hajizadeh (IRI)	4

Quarterfinals
Mehdi Hajizadeh (IRI)	5
Gennadiy Laliyev (KAZ)	4
Xu Xuanchong (CHN)	0
Ahmet Gülhan (TUR)	4
Volodymyr Syrotyn (UKR)	4
Daniel Igali (CAN)	3
Magomed Isagadzhiev (RUS)	3
Guram Mchedlidze (GEO)	0

Semifinals
Mehdi Hajizadeh (IRI)	8
Ahmet Gülhan (TUR)	1
Volodymyr Syrotyn (UKR)	6
Magomed Isagadzhiev (RUS)	8

Final
Mehdi Hajizadeh (IRI)	4
Magomed Isagadzhiev (RUS)	0
Bronze medal match
Ahmet Gülhan (TUR)	5
Volodymyr Syrotyn (UKR)	1

- Ahmet Gülhan of Turkey originally won the bronze medal, but was disqualified after he tested positive for Ephedrine.
