= Wrestling at the 2004 Summer Olympics – Men's freestyle 74 kg =

Men's freestyle 74 kg at the Games of the XXVIII Olympiad
- Venue: Ano Liosia Olympic Hall
- Date: 28–29 August 2004
- Competitors: 21 from 21 nations

Medalists
1st place, gold medalist(s)		Buvaisar Saitiev	Russia
2nd place, silver medalist(s)		Gennadiy Laliyev	Kazakhstan
3rd place, bronze medalist(s)		Iván Fundora	Cuba

The men's freestyle 74 kilograms at the 2004 Summer Olympics as part of the wrestling program were held at the Ano Liosia Olympic Hall, August 28 to August 29.

The competition held with an elimination system of three or four wrestlers in each pool, with the winners qualify for the quarterfinals, semifinals and final by way of direct elimination.

== Schedule ==
All times are Eastern European Summer Time (UTC+03:00)

Date	Time	Event
28 August 2004	09:30	Round 1
28 August 2004	09:30	Round 2
28 August 2004	17:30	Round 3
29 August 2004	09:30	Qualification
29 August 2004	09:30	Semifinals
29 August 2004	14:00	Finals

== Results ==
Legend

- WO — Won by walkover

=== Elimination pools ===
==== Pool 1 ====
Pos	Athlete	Pld	W	L	CP	TP	Qualification
1	Iván Fundora (CUB)	2	2	0	6	14	Knockout round
2	Kunihiko Obata (JPN)	2	1	1	3	8	
3	Sujeet Maan (IND)	2	0	2	0	0	

Source: Official website

	Score		CP
Sujeet Maan (IND)	0–8	Kunihiko Obata (JPN)	0–3 PO
Iván Fundora (CUB)	6–0	Sujeet Maan (IND)	3–0 PO
Kunihiko Obata (JPN)	0–8	Iván Fundora (CUB)	0–3 PO

==== Pool 2 ====
Pos	Athlete	Pld	W	L	CP	TP	Qualification
1	Daniel Igali (CAN)	2	2	0	6	12	Knockout round
2	Yusup Abdusalomov (TJK)	2	1	1	4	9	
3	Elnur Aslanov (AZE)	2	0	2	2	4	

Source: Official website

	Score		CP
Yusup Abdusalomov (TJK)	7–3	Elnur Aslanov (AZE)	3–1 PP
Daniel Igali (CAN)	5–2	Yusup Abdusalomov (TJK)	3–1 PP
Elnur Aslanov (AZE)	1–7	Daniel Igali (CAN)	1–3 PP

==== Pool 3 ====
Pos	Athlete	Pld	W	L	CP	TP	Qualification
1	Gennadiy Laliyev (KAZ)	2	2	0	8	16	Knockout round
2	Arayik Gevorgyan (ARM)	2	1	1	4	11	
3	Nate Ackerman (GBR)	2	0	2	0	0	

Source: Official website

	Score		CP
Nate Ackerman (GBR)	0–11	Arayik Gevorgyan (ARM)	0–4 ST
Gennadiy Laliyev (KAZ)	11–0	Nate Ackerman (GBR)	4–0 ST
Arayik Gevorgyan (ARM)	0–5 Fall	Gennadiy Laliyev (KAZ)	0–4 TO

==== Pool 4 ====
Pos	Athlete	Pld	W	L	CP	TP	Qualification
1	Joe Williams (USA)	2	2	0	6	9	Knockout round
2	Mehdi Hajizadeh (IRI)	2	1	1	3	7	
3	Gela Saghirashvili (GEO)	2	0	2	2	6	

Source: Official website

	Score		CP
Gela Saghirashvili (GEO)	1–6	Joe Williams (USA)	1–3 PP
Mehdi Hajizadeh (IRI)	7–5	Gela Saghirashvili (GEO)	3–1 PP
Joe Williams (USA)	3–0	Mehdi Hajizadeh (IRI)	3–0 PO

==== Pool 5 ====
Pos	Athlete	Pld	W	L	CP	TP	Qualification
1	Murad Gaidarov (BLR)	2	2	0	7	14	Knockout round
2	Salvatore Rinella (ITA)	2	1	1	5	13	
3	Ali Abdo (AUS)	2	0	2	0	0	

Source: Official website

	Score		CP
Ali Abdo (AUS)	0–10	Murad Gaidarov (BLR)	0–4 ST
Salvatore Rinella (ITA)	11–0	Ali Abdo (AUS)	4–0 ST
Murad Gaidarov (BLR)	4–2	Salvatore Rinella (ITA)	3–1 PP

==== Pool 6 ====
Pos	Athlete	Pld	W	L	CP	TP	Qualification
1	Buvaisar Saitiev (RUS)	2	2	0	6	14	Knockout round
2	Emzarios Bentinidis (GRE)	2	1	1	4	6	
3	Árpád Ritter (HUN)	2	0	2	2	3	

Source: Official website

	Score		CP
Árpád Ritter (HUN)	2–8	Buvaisar Saitiev (RUS)	1–3 PP
Emzarios Bentinidis (GRE)	5–1	Árpád Ritter (HUN)	3–1 PP
Buvaisar Saitiev (RUS)	6–1	Emzarios Bentinidis (GRE)	3–1 PP

==== Pool 7 ====
Pos	Athlete	Pld	W	L	CP	TP	Qualification
1	Krystian Brzozowski (POL)	2	2	0	6	7	Knockout round
2	Nikolay Paslar (BUL)	2	1	1	4	6	
3	Sihamir Osmanov (MKD)	2	0	2	1	1	

Source: Official website

	Score		CP
Nikolay Paslar (BUL)	3–3	Krystian Brzozowski (POL)	1–3 PP
Sihamir Osmanov (MKD)	1–3	Nikolay Paslar (BUL)	1–3 PP
Krystian Brzozowski (POL)	4–0	Sihamir Osmanov (MKD)	3–0 PO

=== Knockout round ===
Qualification
Iván Fundora (CUB)	3
Daniel Igali (CAN)	1
Gennadiy Laliyev (KAZ)	3
Joe Williams (USA)	2
Murad Gaidarov (BLR)	2
Buvaisar Saitiev (RUS)	3

Semifinals
Iván Fundora (CUB)	4
Gennadiy Laliyev (KAZ)	5
Buvaisar Saitiev (RUS)	8
Krystian Brzozowski (POL)	0

Gold medal match
Gennadiy Laliyev (KAZ)	0
Buvaisar Saitiev (RUS)	7
Bronze medal match
Iván Fundora (CUB)	3
Krystian Brzozowski (POL)	1

Classification 5–6
Joe Williams (USA)	WO
Murad Gaidarov (BLR)

== Final standing ==
Rank	Athlete
1st place, gold medalist(s)	Buvaisar Saitiev (RUS)
2nd place, silver medalist(s)	Gennadiy Laliyev (KAZ)
3rd place, bronze medalist(s)	Iván Fundora (CUB)
4	Krystian Brzozowski (POL)
5	Joe Williams (USA)
6	Daniel Igali (CAN)
7	Salvatore Rinella (ITA)
8	Arayik Gevorgyan (ARM)
9	Yusup Abdusalomov (TJK)
10	Emzarios Bentinidis (GRE)
11	Nikolay Paslar (BUL)
12	Kunihiko Obata (JPN)
13	Mehdi Hajizadeh (IRI)
14	Gela Saghirashvili (GEO)
15	Elnur Aslanov (AZE)
16	Árpád Ritter (HUN)
17	Sihamir Osmanov (MKD)
18	Sujeet Maan (IND)
19	Nate Ackerman (GBR)
20	Ali Abdo (AUS)
DQ	Murad Gaidarov (BLR)

- Murad Gaidarov was ejected from the competition after he ran off the mat at the conclusion of his quarterfinal bout and assaulted his opponent, Buvaisar Saitiev, before being restrained by security and police.
