= Joe Williams (wrestler) =

American freestyle wrestler (born 1974)

Personal information
- Full name: Joseph E. Williams
- Born: 16 November 1974 (age 51) Chicago, Illinois, U.S.
- Height: 1.72 m (5 ft 7 1/2 in)
- Weight: 74 kg (163 lb)

Sport
- Country: United States
- Style: Freestyle and Folkstyle
- Club: Hawkeye Wrestling Club; Sunkist Kids Wrestling Club
- College team: Iowa
- Coach: Bill Weick; Dan Gable; Jim Zalesky
Medal record
Men's freestyle wrestling
Representing the United States
World Championships
Bronze medal – third place	2001 Sofia	76 kg
Bronze medal – third place	2005 Budapest	74 kg
Pan American Games
Gold medal – first place	1999 Winnipeg	76 kg
Gold medal – first place	2003 Santo Domingo	74 kg
Collegiate Wrestling
Representing the Iowa Hawkeyes
NCAA Division I Championships
Gold medal – first place	1996 Minneapolis	158 lb
Gold medal – first place	1997 Cedar Falls	158 lb
Gold medal – first place	1998 Cleveland	167 lb
Big Ten Championships
Gold medal – first place	1996 East Lansing	158 lb
Gold medal – first place	1998 State College	167 lb
Gold medal – first place	1997 Minneapolis	158 lb
Bronze medal – third place	1994 Iowa City	158 lb

Joe Williams (born November 26, 1974) is an American former freestyle wrestler, who competed in the men's middleweight category. He won ten U.S. national, three consecutive NCAA (1996–1998) and two Pan American Games titles (1999 and 2003), scored two bronze medals in the 74 and 76-kg division at the World Championships (2001 and 2005), and finished fifth at the 2004 Summer Olympics.

A graduate of the University of Iowa, Williams has also served as a member of the wrestling squad for the Iowa Hawkeyes, and eventually worked as an assistant head coach for three consecutive seasons. In 2012, Williams launched his own youth wrestling academy in North Liberty, Iowa, where he has been currently appointed as the managing director and head coach.

== Career ==
=== College ===
Williams started his sporting career as a member of Mount Carmel High School's wrestling team under head coach Bill Weick. From there, he won four-straight Illinois state wrestling titles, and finished high school with an impressive 152–1 overall record, including 95 career falls and a single violation from an illegal slam on his freshman season. He was also named 1992 and 1993 Illinois High School Athlete of the Year by Chicago Tribune.

In 1994, Williams attended the University of Iowa in Iowa City, Iowa on a wrestling scholarship, where he trained and competed for the Iowa Hawkeyes wrestling program, under his coach and 1972 Olympic champion Dan Gable. While wrestling for the Hawkeyes, Williams compiled a 129–9 overall record at the University of Iowa for four consecutive seasons (1994–1998). In his rookie campaign, he placed seventh in the NCAA meet at 158 pounds with a 30–7 record. After redshirting during the 1995 season, Williams went on to claim the first of three NCAA wrestling titles with two coming in the 158-pound division. During his senior year, Williams dominated the field at the 1998 NCAA Championships, as he capped a perfect 34–0 season and picked up his third straight title at 167 pounds, which resulted him to being named the Most Outstanding Wrestler of the tournament and Iowa's fourteenth four-time NCAA All-American. Additionally, he ranked tenth for the most number of triumphs recorded in Iowa, and ended his career on a 39-match winning streak. At the end of 1998 season, Williams graduated with a bachelor's degree in sociology and communication studies from the University of Iowa.

=== Freestyle wrestling ===
In 1999, Williams joined the U.S. world wrestling team, and eventually earned his first berth at the World Championships, where he finished fourth in the 76-kg division behind eventual bronze medalist Adem Bereket of Turkey. On that same year, Williams dominated the field by edging out Cuba's Yosmany Romero for his first career gold medal at the Pan American Games in Winnipeg, Manitoba, Canada.

While competing internationally, Williams achieved seven U.S. national titles (1999, 2001–2005, 2007), and obtained a World Cup series trophy in 2003. He also campaigned for his men's middleweight title defense at the 2003 Pan American Games in Santo Domingo, Dominican Republic, and then captured two bronze medals in the same category at the World Championships (2001 and 2005).

Williams qualified for the U.S. wrestling team on his major debut in the men's 74 kg class at the 2004 Summer Olympics in Athens. Earlier in the process, he won a gold medal over Cuba's Iván Fundora at the Olympic Qualification Tournament in Bratislava, Slovakia, and guaranteed his spot on the U.S. team from the Olympic Trials. Williams opened his match by thrashing Georgia's Gela Saghirashvili (5–1), and then stunned 2002 world champion Mehdi Hajizadeh of Iran with an impressive 7–5 verdict to lead the prelim pool and secure a place in the next round. He lost the quarterfinal match 3–2 to Kazakhstan's Gennadiy Laliyev by just two seconds ahead of overtime, but officially finished fifth in the final standings. Williams' dazing defeat from Laliyev set up a fifth-place match against Belarus' Murad Haidarau, who was immediately disqualified by the officials for an off-mat skirmish with quarterfinal opponent and eventual Olympic champion Buvaisar Saitiev of Russia.

Shortly after the Games, Williams compensated for his Olympic defeat with a bronze-medal effort at the 2005 World Wrestling Championships in Budapest, Hungary, and then defended his fifth straight title in the U.S. Nationals. He missed a chance to compete for his 2006 U.S. world wrestling team, but came back with a top five finish in the 84-kg division at the 2007 World Wrestling Championships in Baku, Azerbaijan, losing the bronze medal match to Iran's Reza Yazdani. In early 2008, Williams announced his retirement from competitive wrestling.

=== Coaching ===
Williams initially joined his alma mater's team staff as a strength and conditioning coach in 2001, until he was immediately promoted into the position of a full-time assistant coach for the Iowa Hawkeyes wrestling program. After three seasons, he left his staff position from the campus to concentrate on making the U.S. Olympic team for the 2004 Summer Olympics.

While serving as an assistant coach in 2003, Williams was accused of indecent exposure to the girlfriend of former Hawkeye wrestler Jason d'Agata inside her apartment in Iowa City, Iowa. Having denied exposing himself, he pleaded not guilty to the Iowa District Court for his charges in 2005, before being acquitted by the jury one year later.

After his sporting career ended in 2008, Williams moved back to his home state of Illinois to focus on his personal life. In 2012, Williams and his family relocated to Iowa City, Iowa, where he established and run a youth wrestling academy through the Iowa City High School. Currently, he serves as a managing director and head coach of the academy. In 2017, Williams was hired to be co-head coach for the wrestling program at the new Liberty High School in North Liberty, Iowa.

== Honors ==
Williams was inducted as a Distinguished Member of the National Wrestling Hall of Fame in 2023.

== Personal life ==
Williams' brothers Steve and T.J. also shared the same sporting discipline with him, as the latter competed for the Hawkeyes at the University of Iowa, where he picked up two NCAA titles (1999 and 2001), while the former earned two junior national titles as a college wrestler. On May 2, 2002, Williams' older brother Steve was visiting from Chicago, when he collapsed and died of a massive asthma attack outside the wrestler's former home in Coralville, Iowa.

Williams currently resides in North Liberty, Iowa with his two sons Kaleb and Wyatt.
