= 2001 Asian Wrestling Championships =

Wrestling competition in Ulaanbaatar, Mongolia

- Host city: Ulaanbaatar, Mongolia
- Dates: 5–10 June 2001
- Stadium: Bökhiin Örgöö

Champions
- Freestyle: Iran
- Greco-Roman: Iran
- Women: China

The 2001 Asian Wrestling Championships were held in Ulaanbaatar, Mongolia. The event took place from June 5 to June 10, 2001.

== Medal table ==
Rank	Nation	Gold	Silver	Bronze	Total
1	Iran	9	4	2	15
2	Japan	4	1	3	8
3	Mongolia	3	3	5	11
4	China	2	5	5	12
5	South Korea	2	1	1	4
6	Uzbekistan	1	3	3	7
7	North Korea	1	1	0	2
8	India	0	2	0	2
9	Kazakhstan	0	1	1	2
9	Kyrgyzstan	0	1	1	2
11	Turkmenistan	0	0	1	1
Totals (11 entries)		22	22	22	66

== Team ranking ==
Rank	Men's freestyle		Men's Greco-Roman		Women's freestyle	
Rank	Team	Points	Team	Points	Team	Points
1	Iran	75	Iran	70	China	55
2	Mongolia	72	Uzbekistan	56.5	Japan	52
3	India	43.5	China	49	Mongolia	38.5
4	Japan	43	Japan	48	India	34
5	China	41	South Korea	46	Chinese Taipei	30
6	South Korea	32	Kazakhstan	43.5	South Korea	29
7	Uzbekistan	28	India	36.5	Kyrgyzstan	20
8	Kazakhstan	26	Mongolia	31	Turkmenistan	17
9	Kyrgyzstan	24	Kyrgyzstan	20	Kazakhstan	6.5
10	North Korea	19	North Korea	10		

== Medal summary ==
=== Men's freestyle ===
Event	Gold	Silver	Bronze
54 kg	Tümendembereliin Züünbayan; Mongolia	So Chang-il; North Korea	Mohammad Aslani; Iran
58 kg	Behnam Tayyebi; Iran	Choi Ho-jin; South Korea	Luvsandambyn Enkhbayar; Mongolia
63 kg	Norjingiin Bayarmagnai; Mongolia	Damir Zakhartdinov; Uzbekistan	Ali Babaei-Jafari; Iran
69 kg	Amir Tavakkolian; Iran	Ramesh Kumar; India	Adiyaakhüügiin Boldsükh; Mongolia
76 kg	Mehdi Hajizadeh; Iran	Buyandelgeriin Batbayar; Mongolia	Kunihiko Obata; Japan
85 kg	Pejman Dorostkar; Iran	Aslan Sanakoev; Uzbekistan	Narantsetsegiin Bürenbaatar; Mongolia
97 kg	Alireza Heidari; Iran	Ganzorigiin Gankhuyag; Mongolia	Alatengaoqier; China
130 kg	Gelegjamtsyn Ösökhbayar; Mongolia	Alireza Rezaei; Iran	Chen Xingqiang; China

=== Men's Greco-Roman ===
Event	Gold	Silver	Bronze
54 kg	Kang Yong-gyun; North Korea	Hassan Rangraz; Iran	Uran Kalilov; Kyrgyzstan
58 kg	Ali Ashkani; Iran	Ailinuer; China	Savriddin Navruzov; Uzbekistan
63 kg	Mehdi Nassiri; Iran	Damirbek Assylbekuly; Kazakhstan	Yoon Young-jin; South Korea
69 kg	Parviz Zeidvand; Iran	Ruslan Biktyakov; Uzbekistan	Lian Chunzhi; China
76 kg	Taichi Suga; Japan	Hossein Marashian; Iran	Wang Gang; China
85 kg	Bae Man-ku; South Korea	Shingo Matsumoto; Japan	Evgeniy Erofaylov; Uzbekistan
97 kg	Aleksey Cheglakov; Uzbekistan	Rasoul Jazini; Iran	Zhassulan Almasbayev; Kazakhstan
130 kg	Alireza Gharibi; Iran	Song Jidong; China	Shermukhammad Kuziev; Uzbekistan

=== Women's freestyle ===
Event	Gold	Silver	Bronze
46 kg	Tomoe Oda; Japan	Tsogtbazaryn Enkhjargal; Mongolia	Tang Liqiong; China
51 kg	Chiharu Icho; Japan	Li Xuehua; China	Naidangiin Otgonjargal; Mongolia
56 kg	Sun Dongmei; China	Sunita Sharma; India	Mariko Shimizu; Japan
62 kg	Ayako Shoda; Japan	Su Huihua; China	Ochirbatyn Myagmarsüren; Mongolia
68 kg	Wang Xu; China	Yana Panova; Kyrgyzstan	Olesýa Nazarenko; Turkmenistan
75 kg	Kang Min-jeong; South Korea	Ma Bailing; China	Mimi Sugawara; Japan

== Participating nations ==
193 competitors from 15 nations competed.

- China (21)
- Chinese Taipei (11)
- India (21)
- Iran (16)
- Japan (21)
- Kazakhstan (16)
- Kyrgyzstan (14)
- Malaysia (2)
- Mongolia (22)
- North Korea (4)
- Philippines (3)
- Qatar (6)
- South Korea (18)
- Turkmenistan (6)
- Uzbekistan (12)
