= Bill Weick =

American wrestler and coach (1932–2017)

Personal information
- Full name: William J. Weick
- Born: 1932 Chicago, Illinois, U.S.
- Died: August 16, 2017 (aged 84–85) Chicago, Illinois, U.S.

Sport
- Country: United States
- Sport: Wrestling
- Events: Greco-Roman and Folkstyle
- College team: Iowa State Teachers College
- Team: USA
Medal record
Collegiate Wrestling
Representing Iowa State Teachers College
NCAA Championships
Gold medal – first place	1952 Fort Collins	157 lb
Gold medal – first place	1955 Ithaca	157 lb

William Weick (1932 – August 16, 2017) was an American wrestler and coach.

== Wrestling career ==
After winning the 1949 Illinois state title at Tilden Tech High School, Weick won two NCAA wrestling titles competing for Iowa State Teachers College (now known as the University of Northern Iowa) in 1952 and 1955. During 1953–1954, he served in the U.S. Army.

Weick was a member of the first U.S. World Greco-Roman wrestling team in 1961. He was a runner-up at the AAU National Championships three times, and was a seven-time place winner, competing in both freestyle and Greco-Roman. From 1961 to 1965, Weick trained at the San Francisco Olympic Club.

== Coaching career ==
Weick coached at San Francisco State in the 1960s, and served a year as the team's head coach.

He was on the U.S. Olympic team coaching staff in freestyle in 1972, 1980, 1984 and 1988, and worked with the Greco-Roman team in 1976. Weick was head coach of the 1975 Pan American Games team that won the team title. He also coached U.S. teams at the 1975 World Cup, three Junior World Championship teams (1969, 1977, 1979) and at the 1981 World University Games. Among the different nations that Weick traveled to coach U.S. teams were Cuba, Mongolia, Panama, Romania, Canada, Russia and France.

His high school coaching career is legendary, with a reported career record of 855–153–2. He started as a coach with Maquoketa High in Iowa, then served most of his career coaching in Illinois at Tilden Tech, Mount Carmel and Brother Rice.

The teams at Mount Carmel, where he coached from 1986 to 2003, achieved national acclaim. Under Weick, Mount Carmel won the state dual meet title three straight years (1992–94) and was second two times (1998, 2002). He had 22 individual state champions during his tenure, the most of any Illinois high school during his time there.

One of the athletes he coached at Mount Carmel was Joe Williams, who went on to win three NCAA titles, two World medals and competed on the 2004 U.S. Olympic Team. In 1999, two of his Mount Carmel wrestlers competed against each other in the NCAA Division I finals, when T.J. Williams of Iowa beat Tony Davis of Northern Iowa.

== Awards ==
Among the Halls of Fame that he has been inducted are the Helms Hall of Fame, the Illinois Wrestling Coaches and Officials Hall of Fame, the University of Northern Iowa Hall of Fame, the Glen Brand Iowa Hall of Fame, the Mount Carmel Hall of Fame, the Tilden Tech Hall of Fame and the National Wrestling Hall of Fame.

He was the Illinois Coach of the Year in 1984.

He has received the National Coach of the Year award from the National Federation of High School Associations. Weick was named Chicagoan of the Year by the Chicago Parks Department in 1995. He was the grand marshal of the 1986 Illinois State High School Wrestling Tournament.
