= Donny Pritzlaff =

American wrestler (born 1979)

Personal information
- Born: January 23, 1979 (age 47) Red Bank, New Jersey, U.S.
- Home town: Lyndhurst, New Jersey, U.S.

Sport
- Country: United States
- Sport: Wrestling
- Events: Freestyle and Folkstyle
- College team: Wisconsin Badgers
- Team: USA
Medal record
Men's freestyle wrestling
Representing the United States
World Championships
Bronze medal – third place	2006 Guangzhou	74 kg
World Cup
Bronze medal – third place	2007 Krasnoyarsk	74 kg
Pan American Championships
Silver medal – second place	2006 Rio De Janeiro	74 kg
Junior World Championships
Gold medal – first place	1998 Las Vegas	70 kg
Collegiate Wrestling
Representing the Wisconsin Badgers
NCAA Division I Championships
Gold medal – first place	2000 St. Louis	165 lb
Gold medal – first place	2001 Iowa City	165 lb

Donny Pritzlaff (born January 23, 1979) is a freestyle wrestler who represented the United States in international competition, winning bronze medals at the 2006 World Wrestling Championships and at the 2007 FILA Wrestling World Cup. He resides in New Jersey and is head coach for the Columbia University wrestling team.

== Junior career ==
Born in Red Bank, New Jersey, Pritzlaff grew up in Lyndhurst, New Jersey and graduated from Lyndhurst High School in 1997, where he was a three-time NJSIAA individual state champion and finished his high school wrestling career with a record of 127–4.

== College career ==
Pritzlaff was a two-time NCAA champion, three-time Big Ten Conference champions, and four-time All-American at the University of Wisconsin. Pritzlaff graduated from Wisconsin in 2002 with a degree in sociology. Pritzlaff was also the 1998 junior world champion.

== International career ==
At the 2006 World Wrestling Championships, Pritzlaff won a bronze medal. Pritzlaff also won a bronze medal at the 2007 FILA Wrestling World Cup.

== Coaching career ==
Pritzlaff has held the following positions:

- Volunteer assistant coach, University of Wisconsin, 2002–2003
- Assistant coach, Hofstra University, 2004–2006
- Assistant coach, University of Wisconsin, 2007–2009
- Associate head coach, University of Wisconsin, 2009–2011
- Assistant coach, University of Michigan, 2011–2014
- Associate head coach, Rutgers University, 2014–2024
- Head coach, Columbia University, 2024–present
