= Wrestling at the 2006 Asian Games – Men's freestyle 74 kg =

Men's freestyle 74 kg at the 2006 Asian Games
- Venue: Aspire Hall 4
- Date: 13 December 2006
- Competitors: 14 from 14 nations

Medalists
gold medal	Ali Asghar Bazri	Iran
silver medal	Cho Byung-kwan	South Korea
bronze medal	Abdulkhakim Shapiyev	Kazakhstan
bronze medal	Soslan Tigiev	Uzbekistan

The men's freestyle 74 kilograms wrestling competition at the 2006 Asian Games in Doha was held on 13 December 2006 at the Aspire Hall 4.

This freestyle wrestling competition consisted of a single-elimination tournament, with a repechage used to determine the winner of two bronze medals. The two finalists faced off for gold and silver medals. Each wrestler who lost to one of the two finalists moved into the repechage, culminating in a pair of bronze medal matches featuring the semifinal losers each facing the remaining repechage opponent from their half of the bracket.

Each bout consisted of up to three rounds, lasting two minutes apiece. The wrestler who scored more points in each round was the winner of that rounds; the bout finished when one wrestler had won two rounds (and thus the match).

== Schedule ==
All times are Arabia Standard Time (UTC+03:00)

Date	Time	Event
Wednesday, 13 December 2006	09:00	Preliminary
Wednesday, 13 December 2006	09:00	Quarterfinals
Wednesday, 13 December 2006	09:00	Semifinals
Wednesday, 13 December 2006	09:00	Repechages
Wednesday, 13 December 2006	18:00	Finals

== Results ==
Legend

- F — Won by fall

=== Main bracket ===
Preliminary
Mohammed Siddiq (QAT)	0	0
Abdulkhakim Shapiyev (KAZ)	1	6
Cho Byung-kwan (KOR)	5	2
Narsingh Yadav (IND)	1	1
Kunihiko Obata (JPN)	1	8
Alai Niýazmengliýew (TKM)	0	2
Ali Asghar Bazri (IRI)	2	2
Myagmaryn Mendsaikhan (MGL)	0	0
Siriguleng (CHN)	0	0
Soslan Tigiev (UZB)	3	1
Lê Duy Hợi (VIE)	6	4	0
Wissam Bassam (IRQ)	0	5	4

Quarterfinals
Ammar Ajouz (SYR)	0	0
Talant Jekshenov (KGZ)	3	3
Abdulkhakim Shapiyev (KAZ)	1	2
Cho Byung-kwan (KOR)	1	3
Kunihiko Obata (JPN)	0	0
Ali Asghar Bazri (IRI)	3	3
Soslan Tigiev (UZB)	7^{F}
Wissam Bassam (IRQ)	0

Semifinals
Talant Jekshenov (KGZ)	1	0	2
Cho Byung-kwan (KOR)	0	2	2
Ali Asghar Bazri (IRI)	1	3
Soslan Tigiev (UZB)	0	1

Gold medal match
Cho Byung-kwan (KOR)	1	0
Ali Asghar Bazri (IRI)	2	1

=== Repechage ===
Repechage
Narsingh Yadav (IND)	1	1	1
Abdulkhakim Shapiyev (KAZ)	3	0	1
Myagmaryn Mendsaikhan (MGL)	1	3
Kunihiko Obata (JPN)	8	6

Bronze medal match
Abdulkhakim Shapiyev (KAZ)	0	4	1
Talant Jekshenov (KGZ)	1	3	0
Kunihiko Obata (JPN)	0	0
Soslan Tigiev (UZB)	2	2

== Final standing ==
Rank	Athlete
1st place, gold medalist(s)	Ali Asghar Bazri (IRI)
2nd place, silver medalist(s)	Cho Byung-kwan (KOR)
3rd place, bronze medalist(s)	Abdulkhakim Shapiyev (KAZ)
3rd place, bronze medalist(s)	Soslan Tigiev (UZB)
5	Talant Jekshenov (KGZ)
5	Kunihiko Obata (JPN)
7	Wissam Bassam (IRQ)
8	Narsingh Yadav (IND)
9	Lê Duy Hợi (VIE)
10	Myagmaryn Mendsaikhan (MGL)
11	Alai Niýazmengliýew (TKM)
12	Siriguleng (CHN)
13	Ammar Ajouz (SYR)
14	Mohammed Siddiq (QAT)
