= Ruslan Kokaev =

Russian wrestler (born 1980)

Personal information
- Born: 12 September 1980 (age 45) Vladikavkaz, North Ossetia
- Height: 1.80 m (5 ft 11 in)
- Weight: 74 kg (163 lb)

Sport
- Sport: Wrestling
- Event: Freestyle
- Club: Alania SK
- Coached by: Mairbek Gizikova
Medal record
Men's freestyle wrestling
Representing Russia
European Championships
Gold medal – first place	2004 Ankara	74 kg
Representing Armenia
European Championships
Silver medal – second place	2006 Moscow	74 kg

Ruslan Kokaev (born 12 September 1980) is a retired Russian-born Freestyle wrestler of Ossetian descent. He switched to the Armenian national wrestling team in 2006. Kokaev won a gold medal at the European Wrestling Championships in 2004 representing Russia and a silver medal in 2006 representing Armenia.
