= Ali Asghar Bazri =

Iranian wrestler (born 1980)

Medal record

Representing Iran

Men's Freestyle Wrestling

World Championships
Silver medal – second place	2006 Guangzhou	74 kg

Asian Games
Gold medal – first place	2006 Doha	74 kg

Ali Asghar Bazri (Persian: علی اصغر بذری; born September 11, 1980, in Behshahr, Mazandaran, Iran) is an Iranian wrestler who competed in the 2006 Asian Games in the 74 kg division and won the gold medal.
