= 2001 World Wrestling Championships =

Freestyle
- Host city: Sofia, Bulgaria
- Dates: 22–25 November 2001
- Stadium: Winter Sports Palace

Greco-Roman
- Host city: Patras, Greece
- Dates: 6–9 December 2001
- Stadium: Dimitris Tofalos Arena

Champions
- Freestyle: Russia
- Greco-Roman: Cuba
- Women: China

The following is the final results of the 2001 World Wrestling Championships. Freestyle competition were held in Sofia, Bulgaria and Greco-Roman competition were held in Patras, Greece.

The championships were originally scheduled to be held in New York City, United States, at Madison Square Garden from 26 to 29 September. However, the attack on the World Trade Center a short distance away on 11 September caused the event to be postponed and eventually moved. New York City would ultimately hold the 2003 World Wrestling Championships instead.

== Medal table ==
Rank	Nation	Gold	Silver	Bronze	Total
1	Russia	5	3	1	9
2	Bulgaria	2	1	0	3
2	Canada	2	1	0	3
4	Japan	2	0	0	2
5	United States	1	5	1	7
6	Iran	1	3	0	4
7	Cuba	1	1	4	6
8	China	1	1	1	3
9	Armenia	1	1	0	2
9	Uzbekistan	1	1	0	2
11	Ukraine	1	0	5	6
12	Georgia	1	0	1	2
13	Belarus	1	0	0	1
13	Poland	1	0	0	1
13	Sweden	1	0	0	1
16	South Korea	0	2	2	4
17	Hungary	0	1	0	1
17	Italy	0	1	0	1
17	Mongolia	0	1	0	1
20	Germany	0	0	3	3
21	Greece	0	0	1	1
21	Israel	0	0	1	1
21	Norway	0	0	1	1
21	Turkey	0	0	1	1
Totals (24 entries)		22	22	22	66

== Team ranking ==
Rank	Men's freestyle		Men's Greco-Roman		Women's freestyle	
Rank	Team	Points	Team	Points	Team	Points
1	Russia	51	Cuba	54	China	36
2	Bulgaria	46	Russia	38	Japan	33
3	Iran	37	United States	33	Ukraine	33
4	Georgia	31	Sweden	26	Germany	31
5	United States	28	Iran	24	Canada	30
6	Turkey	27	South Korea	24	Russia	25
7	Cuba	25	Hungary	24	United States	24
8	Ukraine	23	Ukraine	23	Poland	17
9	Uzbekistan	21	Armenia	19	France	14
10	South Korea	19	Uzbekistan	18	Belarus	13

== Medal summary ==
=== Men's freestyle ===
Event	Gold	Silver	Bronze
54 kg	Herman Kantoyeu; Belarus	Babak Nourzad; Iran	Aleksandr Kontoev; Russia
58 kg	Guivi Sissaouri; Canada	Oyuunbilegiin Pürevbaatar; Mongolia	David Pogosian; Georgia
63 kg	Serafim Barzakov; Bulgaria	Alireza Dabir; Iran	Elbrus Tedeyev; Ukraine
69 kg	Nikolay Paslar; Bulgaria	Amir Tavakkolian; Iran	Jang Jae-sung; South Korea
76 kg	Buvaisar Saitiev; Russia	Moon Eui-jae; South Korea	Joe Williams; United States
85 kg	Khadzhimurad Magomedov; Russia	Brandon Eggum; United States	Yoel Romero; Cuba
97 kg	Giorgi Gogshelidze; Russia	Krasimir Kochev; Bulgaria	Vadim Tasoyev; Ukraine
130 kg	David Musulbes; Russia	Artur Taymazov; Uzbekistan	Alexis Rodríguez; Cuba

=== Men's Greco-Roman ===
Event	Gold	Silver	Bronze
54 kg	Hassan Rangraz; Iran	Brandon Paulson; United States	Lázaro Rivas; Cuba
58 kg	Dilshod Aripov; Uzbekistan	Karen Mnatsakanyan; Armenia	Roberto Monzón; Cuba
63 kg	Vaghinak Galstyan; Armenia	Kim In-sub; South Korea	Michael Beilin; Israel
69 kg	Filiberto Azcuy; Cuba	Aleksey Glushkov; Russia	Rustam Adzhi; Ukraine
76 kg	Ara Abrahamian; Sweden	Aleksey Mishin; Russia	Kim Jin-soo; South Korea
85 kg	Mukhran Vakhtangadze; Georgia	Matt Lindland; United States	Oleksandr Daragan; Ukraine
97 kg	Aleksandr Bezruchkin; Russia	Ernesto Peña; Cuba	Mehmet Özal; Turkey
130 kg	Rulon Gardner; United States	Mihály Deák-Bárdos; Hungary	Xenofon Koutsioumpas; Greece

=== Women's freestyle ===
Event	Gold	Silver	Bronze
46 kg	Iryna Melnik; Ukraine	Carol Huynh; Canada	Brigitte Wagner; Germany
51 kg	Hitomi Sakamoto; Japan	Stephanie Murata; United States	Gao Yanzhi; China
56 kg	Seiko Yamamoto; Japan	Lubov Volosova; Russia	Tetyana Lazareva; Ukraine
62 kg	Meng Lili; China	Diletta Giampiccolo; Italy	Lene Aanes; Norway
68 kg	Christine Nordhagen; Canada	Toccara Montgomery; United States	Anita Schätzle; Germany
75 kg	Edyta Witkowska; Poland	Ma Bailing; China	Nina Englich; Germany

== Participating nations ==
=== Freestyle ===
322 competitors from 52 nations participated.

- Armenia (4)
- Australia (1)
- Azerbaijan (5)
- Belarus (11)
- Brazil (2)
- Bulgaria (14)
- Canada (11)
- China (6)
- Cuba (8)
- Czech Republic (4)
- Egypt (3)
- Estonia (2)
- Finland (2)
- France (4)
- Georgia (8)
- Germany (13)
- Great Britain (4)
- Greece (11)
- Hungary (6)
- India (8)
- Iran (8)
- Israel (1)
- Italy (2)
- Japan (14)
- Kazakhstan (6)
- Kyrgyzstan (7)
- Latvia (4)
- Lithuania (1)
- Macedonia (3)
- Moldova (4)
- Mongolia (11)
- Netherlands (3)
- New Zealand (2)
- Norway (3)
- Peru (3)
- Poland (13)
- Puerto Rico (3)
- Romania (4)
- Russia (14)
- Slovakia (4)
- South Africa (1)
- South Korea (11)
- Spain (4)
- Sweden (3)
- Switzerland (4)
- Turkey (12)
- Turkmenistan (3)
- Ukraine (14)
- United States (14)
- Uzbekistan (7)
- Venezuela (8)
- Vietnam (4)

=== Greco-Roman ===
243 competitors from 53 nations participated.

- Armenia (5)
- Australia (3)
- Austria (2)
- Azerbaijan (4)
- Belarus (8)
- Brazil (1)
- Bulgaria (8)
- Canada (2)
- Chile (2)
- China (5)
- Chinese Taipei (2)
- Cuba (8)
- Cyprus (1)
- Czech Republic (6)
- Denmark (2)
- Egypt (1)
- Estonia (4)
- Finland (7)
- France (5)
- Georgia (8)
- Germany (8)
- Greece (7)
- Hungary (8)
- India (8)
- Iran (8)
- Israel (6)
- Italy (1)
- Japan (7)
- Kazakhstan (5)
- Kyrgyzstan (2)
- Lithuania (2)
- Mexico (1)
- Moldova (2)
- Netherlands (4)
- Norway (3)
- Peru (3)
- Poland (8)
- Portugal (1)
- Romania (6)
- Russia (8)
- Slovakia (2)
- South Korea (8)
- Spain (2)
- Sweden (6)
- Switzerland (4)
- Turkey (8)
- Turkmenistan (1)
- U. S. Virgin Islands (1)
- Ukraine (8)
- United States (8)
- Uzbekistan (7)
- Venezuela (3)
- Yugoslavia (3)
