= Sihamir Osmanov =

Macedonian freestyle wrestler

Personal information
- Full name: Sihamir Osmanov
- Nationality: North Macedonia
- Born: 25 May 1975 (age 51) Makhachkala, Russian SFSR, Soviet Union
- Height: 1.72 m (5 ft 7 1/2 in)
- Weight: 74 kg (163 lb)

Sport
- Style: Freestyle
- Club: Varda Makedonia
- Coach: Nasir Gadzhikhanov

Sihamir Osmanov (Macedonian: Шихамир Османов; born May 25, 1975, in Makhachkala, Russian SFSR) is a retired amateur Macedonian freestyle wrestler, who competed in the men's middleweight category. He finished fifth in the 74-kg division at the 2003 World Wrestling Championships in New York City, New York, United States, and later represented the Republic of Macedonia at the 2004 Summer Olympics. Osmanov also trained full-time as a member of the wrestling squad for Varda Makedonia Sports Club in Skopje under his personal coach and 2000 Olympian Nasir Gadzhikhanov.

Osmanov qualified for his naturalized Macedonian squad in the men's 74 kg class at the 2004 Summer Olympics in Athens by receiving a berth and rounding out the fifth spot from the World Championships. He lost his opening match 1–3 to neighboring Bulgaria's Nikolay Paslar, and could not attain a single point to overwhelm Poland's Krystian Brzozowski by a 4–0 deficit, leaving him on the bottom of the prelim pool and placing seventeenth in the final standings.
