= Sujeet Maan =

Indian freestyle wrestler

Personal information
- Full name: Sujeet Maan
- Nationality: India
- Born: 15 December 1978 (age 47) New Delhi, India
- Height: 1.72 m (5 ft 7 1/2 in)
- Weight: 74 kg (163 lb)

Sport
- Style: Freestyle
- Club: Guru Hanuman Wrestling Club
- Coach: Maha Singh Rao
Medal record
Men's freestyle wrestling
Representing India
Asian Championships
Silver medal – second place	2004 Tehran	74 kg
Bronze medal – third place	1999 Tashkent	69 kg
Bronze medal – third place	2000 Guilin	69 kg
Bronze medal – third place	2003 New Delhi	74 kg
Commonwealth Championships
Gold medal – first place	2003 Ontario, Canada	74 kg

Sujeet Maan (Hindi: सुजीत मान; born 15 December 1978 in New Delhi) is a retired amateur Indian freestyle wrestler, who competed in the men's middleweight category. He achieved top six finishes in the 74-kg division at the Asian Games (1998 and 2002), produced a stark tally of four medals (one silver and three bronze) at the Asian Wrestling Championships, and also represented his nation India at the 2004 Summer Olympics. Before his sporting career ended in 2006, Maan trained full-time for Guru Hanuman Wrestling Club in his native New Delhi, under his coach and mentor Maha Singhrao.

Maan made his senior sporting debut at the 1998 Asian Games in Bangkok, Thailand, where he placed fourth in the men's welterweight class (69 kg), losing out to Japan's Ryusaburo Katsu by a tough 2–3 verdict. Determined to return to the sporting scene, Maan continued to blossom his wrestling career by collecting three bronze medals in the same class at the Asian Wrestling Championships since 1999, until he delivered his stellar performance with a silver in 2004. He also entered the 2002 Asian Games in Busan, South Korea as one of the heavy medal favorites in the middleweight category, but left empty-handed with a sixth-place finish.

He won a gold medal at the 2003 Commonwealth Wrestling Championships help in London, Ontario, Canada. He was awarded the Best Wrestler Award at the 2003 Commonwealth Wrestling Championships for outscoring all his opponents 10-0. At the 2004 Summer Olympics in Athens, Maan qualified for his first Indian squad in the men's 74 kg class. Earlier in the process, he clinched the eighth spot at the 2003 World Wrestling Championships in New York City, New York, and then confirmed his berth on the Indian team by placing second from the Asian Championships in Tehran, Iran. At the 2004 Olympics he lost two straight matches each to Japan's Kunihiko Obata (8–0) and Cuba's Iván Fundora (6–0) by an identical margin, leaving him on the bottom of the prelim pool and placing eighteenth in the final standings. He played his last competition at 2006 World Wrestling Championships at 84 kg, where he lost his first bout, placing 21st in the competition. He is currently the personal coach of Tokyo Olympics Bronze medallist Bajrang Punia.
