= Elnur Aslanov (wrestler) =

Azerbaijani freestyle wrestler

Personal information
- Nationality: Azerbaijani
- Born: 2 January 1983 Baku, Azerbaijan
- Died: June 2012 (aged 29)

Sport
- Sport: Wrestling

Elnur Aslanov (2 January 1983 – June 2012) was an Azerbaijani wrestler. He competed in the men's freestyle 74 kg at the 2004 Summer Olympics.
