= Ali Abdo (wrestler) =

Australian freestyle wrestler (born 1981)

Personal information
- Born: 2 May 1981 (age 45) Melbourne, Australia

Sport
- Club: Melbourne Wrestling Academy

Ali Abdo (born 2 May 1981) is a male freestyle wrestler from Australia. He participated in the 2000, 2004 and 2008 Summer Olympics. In Beijing in 2008, he competed in the Men's freestyle 74 kg and was eliminated in the round of 32 losing to Ahmet Gülhan from Turkey.

He won the Oceania championships during 1998–2012 and won Australian titles on numerous occasions. Highlight performances include finishing 3rd at both the Canada Cup 2008 & Commonwealth Championships 2011 and 3rd at the African Championships.

He continues to train and compete and on 12 April 2014 he qualified for the 2014 Commonwealth Games in Scotland. Although most of his time is spent working as an Osteopath in Melbourne (Avesenna Osteopathy), Ali also runs the Melbourne Wrestling Academy with older brother, Bilal Abdo who was a Commonwealth Games representative.
