= Salvatore Rinella =

Italian wrestler (born 1975)

Personal information
- Full name: Salvatore Marcello Rinella
- Nationality: Italy
- Born: 27 February 1975 (age 51) Palermo, Italy
- Height: 1.76 m (5 ft 9 1/2 in)
- Weight: 74 kg (163 lb)

Sport
- Style: Freestyle
- Club: Fiamme Oro
- Coach: Mauro Massaro
Medal record
Men's freestyle wrestling
Representing Italy
Mediterranean Games
Bronze medal – third place	1997 Bari	69 kg
Bronze medal – third place	2001 Sofia	69 kg
Bronze medal – third place	2005 Almería	74 kg

Salvatore Marcello Rinella (Italian pronunciation: [salvaˈtoːre riˈnɛlla]; born 27 February 1975 in Palermo) is a retired amateur Italian freestyle wrestler, who competed in the men's middleweight category. He won three bronze medals in the 69 and 74-kg division at the Mediterranean Games (1997, 2001, and 2005), and also represented his nation Italy at the 2004 Summer Olympics. Having worked as a police officer for Polizia di Stato, Rinella trained full-time for the wrestling squad at Gruppo Sportivo Fiamme Oro in Rome, under head coach Mauro Massaro.

== Biography ==
Rinella qualified for the Italian squad in the men's 74 kg class at the 2004 Summer Olympics in Athens. Earlier in the process, Rinella received a ticket to the Olympics by defeating Tajikistan's Yusup Abdusalomov for a third spot at the Olympic Qualification Tournament in Sofia, Bulgaria. He easily ousted Australia's Ali Abdo in his opening match on technical superiority, but fell behind Belarus' Murad Haidarau by a 2–4 deficit at the end of the prelim pool. Finishing second in the pool and seventh overall, Rinella's performance was not enough to advance him to the quarterfinals.

In 2005, Rinella overcame his Olympic setback with a third career bronze medal in the same class at the Mediterranean Games in Almería, Spain. He also sought his bid for the 2008 Summer Olympics in Beijing, but failed to earn a spot from the Olympic Qualification Tournament, effectively ending his sporting career.
