= Mehdi Hajizadeh =

Iranian wrestler (born 1981)

Medal record

Men's freestyle wrestling

Representing Iran

World Championships
Gold medal – first place	2002 Tehran	74 kg

Asian Championships
Gold medal – first place	2001 Ulan Bator	76kg

Asian Games
Bronze medal – third place	2002 Busan	74 kg

Mehdi Hajizadeh Jooybari (Persian: مهدی حاجی زاده جویباری; born 11 September 1981 in Jooybar) is an Iranian wrestler. He competed for Iran at the 2004 Summer Olympics, finishing 13th in the men's freestyle 74 kg event.

He is freestyle wrestler who competed for Iran at the 2002 World Championships in Tehran. He was considered an inexperienced twenty one year old underdog going into the 2002 Iranian World Qualifiers but was successful beating a more experienced and successful wrestler. The Iranian Wrestling Federation had Hajizadeh wrestle the favourite again and he beat him once more earning a berth to compete for Iran in the World Championships at home. The young Hajizadeh continued his strong wrestling as he went undefeated to dominantly win the 2002 World Championship title and also earned the award as the top wrestler in the tournament.
