= Nikolay Paslar =

Bulgarian freestyle wrestler

Personal information
- Full name: Nikolay Ivanovich Paslar
- Nationality: Bulgaria
- Born: 12 June 1980 (age 46) Taraclia, Moldavian SSR, Soviet Union
- Height: 1.62 m (5 ft 4 in)
- Weight: 76 kg (168 lb)

Sport
- Style: Freestyle
- Club: Slavia Sofia
- Coach: Ilian Stefanov
Medal record
Men's freestyle wrestling
Representing Bulgaria
World Championships
Gold medal – first place	2001 Sofia	69 kg
Bronze medal – third place	2005 Budapest	74 kg
European Championships
Gold medal – first place	2005 Varna	74 kg
Bronze medal – third place	2000 Budapest	69 kg
Bronze medal – third place	2001 Budapest	69 kg
Bronze medal – third place	2002 Baku	69 kg

Nikolay Ivanovich Paslar (Bulgarian: Николай Иванович Паслар; born 12 June 1980 in Taraclia, Moldavian SSR) is an amateur Bulgarian freestyle wrestler, who competed in the men's middleweight category. Considered as one of Bulgaria's top freestyle wrestlers in his decade, Paslar has claimed two career medals (one gold and one bronze) in the 69 and 74-kg division at the World Championships (2001 and 2005), and later represented his nation Bulgaria at the 2004 Summer Olympics. Throughout his sporting career, Paslar trained full time as a member of the wrestling squad for Slavia Sports Club in Sofia under his personal coach Ilian Stefanov.

As a naturalized member of the Bulgarian squad, Paslar emerged into the international scene at the 2001 World Wrestling Championships in Sofia, where he thrashed Iranian wrestler Amir Tavakkolian for the gold in the 69-kg division. For displaying his early success to the sport, Paslar was highly acclaimed the Best Wrestler of the Year by the Bulgarian Sports Federation and the International Federation of Associated Wrestling (FILA).

At the 2004 Summer Olympics in Athens, Paslar qualified for his first Bulgarian team in the men's 74 kg class with an unforeseen result. Unable to fill an available spot from the World Championships, Paslar received a ticket to the Olympics by defeating Georgia's Gela Saghirashvili for a first-place finish at the Olympic Qualification Tournament in Sofia. Paslar could not pull a 3–3 tie to overwhelm Poland's Krystian Brzozowski on his opening match, but eclipsed the neighboring Macedonia's Sihamir Osmanov with a 3–1 victory to close the round-robin. Finishing second in the prelim pool and eleventh overall, Paslar's performance fell short to advance him further into the quarterfinals.

Determined to offer another shot of a medal from a four-year drought, Paslar had picked up a gold in the 74-kg division at the 2005 European Championships in Varna, and a bronze at the World Championships in Budapest, Hungary. He continued to flourish his sporting career at the next World and European Championships, but left them empty-handed before his impending retirement in 2007.

In 2013, Paslar came out of retirement from the sport to compete again for the World Championships in Budapest. Fighting at ten kilograms heavier than his previous sporting years, Paslar qualified for the men's light heavyweight category, but made an unprecedented exit with a 5–0 loss to Georgian wrestler and 2012 Olympian Dato Marsagishvili in his opening match.
