= Kunihiko Obata =

Japanese wrestler (born 1980)

Personal information
- Full name: Kunihiko Obata
- Nationality: Japan
- Born: 17 October 1980 (age 45) Hōfu, Yamaguchi, Japan
- Height: 1.76 m (5 ft 9 1/2 in)
- Weight: 74 kg (163 lb)

Sport
- Style: Freestyle
- Club: Yamanashi Gakuin University
- Coach: Yuji Takada
Medal record
Men's freestyle wrestling
Representing Japan
Asian Championships
| Bronze medal – third place | 2001 Ulaanbaatar | 76 kg |
| Bronze medal – third place | 2004 Tehran | 74 kg |

Kunihiko Obata (小幡 邦彦, Obata Kunihiko; born October 17, 1980 in Hōfu, Yamaguchi) is a retired amateur Japanese freestyle wrestler, who competed in the men's middleweight category. He achieved top eight finishes in the 74-kg division at the Asian Games (2002 and 2006), scored two bronze medals at the 2001 and 2004 Asian Wrestling Championships, and also represented his nation Japan at the 2004 Summer Olympics. Before his sporting career ended in late 2006, Obata trained as part of the men's freestyle wrestling squad at Yamanashi Gakuin University under his coach and mentor Yuji Takada.

Obata emerged into the global spotlight by taking home the bronze medal in the 76-kg division at the 2001 Asian Wrestling Championships in Ulaanbaatar, Mongolia. He also entered the 2002 Asian Games in Busan, South Korea as one of the heavy medal favorites in the middleweight category, but left empty-handed with a seventh-place finish.

At the 2004 Summer Olympics in Athens, Obata qualified for his first Japanese squad in the men's 74 kg class. Earlier in the process, he rounded out the top ten spots at the 2003 World Wrestling Championships in New York City, New York, and then guaranteed his spot on the Japanese team by placing third from the Asian Championships in Tehran, Iran. He easily ousted India's Sujeet Maan on his opening match 8–0, but could not resemble a scoring margin to turn down Cuba's Iván Fundora on the mat in his second bout. Placing second in the prelim pool and twelfth in the final standings, Obata's performance fell short to put him further into the quarterfinals.

At the 2006 Asian Games in Doha, Qatar, Obata notched a pair of two easy victories in the same tournament, but could not score enough points to dismantle Uzbekistan's Soslan Tigiev for the bronze medal 0–4, dropping him to fifth.
