= Gennadiy Laliyev =

Kazakhstani freestyle wrestler (born 1979)

Medal record

Men's freestyle wrestling

Representing Kazakhstan

Olympic Games
Silver medal – second place	2004 Athens	74 kg

Gennadiy Laliyev (born March 30, 1979) is a Kazakhstani wrestler who competed in the Men's Freestyle 74 kg at the 2004 Summer Olympics representing Kazakhstan and won the silver medal. He also competed in the 2008 Summer Olympics in the Men's Freestyle 84 kg, placing 13th. He has been a scholarship holder with the Olympic Solidarity program since November 2002.
