= Árpád Ritter =

Hungarian freestyle wrestler (born 1975)

Árpád Ritter (born 12 June 1975) is a Hungarian former wrestler who competed in the 1996 Summer Olympics, in the 2000 Summer Olympics, and in the 2004 Summer Olympics.
