= Iván Fundora =

Cuban freestyle wrestler

Personal information
- Born: April 14, 1976 (age 50) Havana, Cuba
Medal record
Men's freestyle wrestling
Representing Cuba
Olympic Games
Bronze medal – third place	2004 Athens	74 kg
World Championships
Bronze medal – third place	2007 Baku	74 kg
Pan American Games
Gold medal – first place	2007 Rio de Janeiro	74 kg

Ivan Fundora Zaldivar (born April 14, 1976) is a former Cuban freestyle wrestler, who was an Olympian in 2004 and 2008. He won the bronze medal in the Men's freestyle 74kg at the 2004 Summer Olympics. and finished in 5th place in Men's freestyle 74 kg at the 2008 Summer Olympics.

Fundora also wrestled at 5 world championships. He won bronze at the 2007 FILA Wrestling World Championships.

In addition, Fundora also won a gold medal in Wrestling at the 2007 Pan American Games and came in first place each year from 2003 to 2010 at the Pan American Championships. He is notable among American wrestling fans for defeating Ben Askren at the 2008 Olympics.
